= Phil Spector discography =

This is a list of record that were produced or co-produced by Phil Spector.

== Selected albums as producer (unless otherwise stated) ==
Year	Title	Artist	Notes	Ref
1959	The Teddy Bears Sing	The Teddy Bears	Vocals	
1962	Twist Uptown	The Crystals		
1963	He's a Rebel	The Crystals		
1963	Zip-A Dee-Doo-Dah	Bob B. Soxx and the Blue Jeans		
1963	A Christmas Gift for You from Philles Records	Various artists		
1964	Presenting the Fabulous Ronettes Featuring Veronica	The Ronettes	Composer	
1966	River Deep – Mountain High	Ike & Tina Turner	Producer and composer	
1969	Love Is All We Have to Give	Sonny Charles and the Checkmates, Ltd.	Producer and composer	
1970	Let It Be	The Beatles		
1970	All Things Must Pass	George Harrison	Co-producer	
1970	John Lennon/Plastic Ono Band	John Lennon/Plastic Ono Band	Co-producer	
1971	Imagine	John Lennon/Plastic Ono Band	Co-producer	
1971	The Concert for Bangladesh	George Harrison and Friends	Co-producer	
1972	Some Time in New York City	John Lennon and Yoko Ono/Plastic Ono Band with Elephant's Memory	Co-producer	
1975	Rock 'n' Roll	John Lennon	Co-producer	
1975	Born to Be with You	Dion	Producer, guitarist and composer	
1977	Death of a Ladies' Man	Leonard Cohen		
1980	End of the Century	Ramones	Producer and composer	
1981	Season of Glass	Yoko Ono	Co-producer	
1986	Menlove Ave.	John Lennon	Co-producer	
1991	Back to Mono (1958–1969) (box set compilation)	Various artists	Producer, guitarist, vocals, composer	
2003	Silence Is Easy	Starsailor	Co-producer	

== Top singles, peak date, and Billboard US rank ==
Peak date	Title	Artist	Billboard US Rank	Ref
1958, December 1	"To Know Him Is to Love Him"	The Teddy Bears	#1	
1961, January 9	"Corrine, Corrina"	Ray Peterson	#9	
1961, August 7	"Pretty Little Angel Eyes"	Curtis Lee	#7	
1961, September 11	"Every Breath I Take"	Gene Pitney	#42	
1961, October 30	"I Love How You Love Me"	The Paris Sisters	#5	
1961, November 27	"Under the Moon of Love"	Curtis Lee	#46	
1962, January 6	"There's No Other (Like My Baby)"	The Crystals	#20	
1962, January 27	"I Could Have Loved You So Well"	Ray Peterson	#57	
1962, March 10	"He Knows I Love Him Too Much"	The Paris Sisters	#34	
1962, May 26	"Uptown"	The Crystals	#13	
1962, May 26	"Let Me Be the One"	The Paris Sisters	#87	
1962, June 9	"Second Hand Love"	Connie Francis	#7	
1962, November 3	"He's a Rebel"	The Blossoms, credited to the Crystals	#1	
1963, January 12	"Zip-a-Dee-Doo-Dah"	Bob B. Soxx & the Blue Jeans	#8	
1963, February 16	"He's Sure the Boy I Love"	The Blossoms, credited to the Crystals	#11	
1963, February 16	"Puddin' n' Tain (Ask Me Again, I'll Tell You the Same)"	The Alley Cats	#43	
1963, March 30	"Why Do Lovers Break Each Other's Heart"	Bob B. Soxx and the Blue Jeans	#38	
1963, May 11	"(Today I Met) The Boy I'm Gonna Marry"	Darlene Love	#39	
1963, June 8	"Da Doo Ron Ron (When He Walked Me Home)"	The Crystals	#3	
1963, July 13	"Not Too Young to Get Married"	Bob B. Soxx and the Blue Jeans	#63	
1963, September 7	"Wait 'til My Bobby Gets Home"	Darlene Love	#26	
1963, September 14	"Then He Kissed Me"	The Crystals	#6	
1963, October 12	"Be My Baby"	The Ronettes	#2	
1963, November 30	"A Fine, Fine Boy"	Darlene Love	#29	
1963, December 5	"Walking in the Rain"	The Ronettes	#23	
1964, February 1	"Baby, I Love You"	The Ronettes	#24	
1964, May 16	"(The Best Part of) Breakin' Up"	The Ronettes	#39	
1964, August 1	"Do I Love You?"	The Ronettes	#34	
1965 February 6	"You've Lost That Lovin' Feelin'"	The Righteous Brothers	#1, UK #1	
1965, May 15	"Just Once in My Life"	The Righteous Brothers	#9	
1965, August 21	"Hung on you"	The Righteous Brothers	#47	
1965, August 28	"Unchained Melody"	The Righteous Brothers	#4	
1966, January 8	"Ebb Tide"	The Righteous Brothers	#5	
1966, June 18	"River Deep – Mountain High"	Ike & Tina Turner	#88 UK #3	
1969, May 3	"Love Is All I Have to Give"	The Checkmates, Ltd.	#65	
1969, July 5	"Black Pearl"	The Checkmates, Ltd.	#13	
1969, November 1	"Proud Mary"	The Checkmates, Ltd.	#69	
1970, March 28	"Instant Karma! (We All Shine On)"	Plastic Ono Band	#3	
1970, June 13	"The Long and Winding Road" / "For You Blue"	The Beatles	#1	
1970, December 26	"My Sweet Lord" / "Isn't It a Pity"	George Harrison	#1	
1971, January 30	"Mother"	John Lennon/Plastic Ono Band	#43	
1971, February 27	"What Is Life"	George Harrison	#10	
1971, May 1	"Power to the People"	John Lennon/Plastic Ono Band	#11	
1971, May 22	"Try Some, Buy Some"	Ronnie Spector	#77	
1971, September 11	"Bangla Desh"	George Harrison	#23	
1971, November 13	"Imagine"	John Lennon/Plastic Ono Band	#3	
1972, June 10	"Woman Is the Nigger of the World"	John and Yoko/Plastic Ono Band with Elephant's Memory	#57	
1979, September 8	"Rock 'n' Roll High School"	Ramones	UK #67	
1980, January 26	"Baby, I Love You"	Ramones	UK #8	
1980, April 19	"Do You Remember Rock 'n' Roll Radio?"	Ramones	UK #54	
2003, January 9	"Silence Is Easy"	Starsailor	UK #8	
2022, January 1	"Sleigh Ride"	The Ronettes	#10	
2022, January 1	"Christmas (Baby, Please Come Home)"	Darlene Love	#16	
