= Back to Mono (1958–1969) =

Box set by Phil Spector
- Released: November 12, 1991
- Recorded: 1958–1969
- Genre: Orchestral pop, rhythm and blues
- Length: 206:12
- Label: ABKCO
- Producer: Phil Spector; Jerry Leiber and Mike Stoller

Professional ratings
Review scores
Source	Rating
AllMusic	5/5 stars

Back to Mono (1958–1969) is a box set that compiles tracks produced by the American record producer Phil Spector between 1958 and 1969. It was released in 1991 by ABKCO. Initially a vinyl album-sized package, the box contained a booklet with photographs, complete song lyrics, discographical information, and a reproduction of the essay on Spector by Tom Wolfe, "The First Tycoon of Teen." The package also contained a small, round, red "Back to Mono" pin. In 2003, it was ranked number 64 on Rolling Stone's 500 Greatest Albums of All Time.

== Content ==
Back to Mono surveys recordings leading up to and featuring the Wall of Sound, Spector's famed production trademark. Starting with "He's A Rebel" on disc one, through "I'll Never Need More Than This" and including disc four, all of the musical arrangements are by Jack Nitzsche. The list of musicians contributing to the tracks number in the hundreds, but prominent among them are Brian Wilson, Hal Blaine, Sonny Bono, Red Callender, Glen Campbell, Al DeLory, Steve Douglas, Jim Gordon, Jim Horn, Carol Kaye, Barney Kessel, Larry Knechtel, Jay Migliori, Ray Pohlman, Don Randi, Lyle Ritz, Billy Strange, Tommy Tedesco, Bill Pitman, and Nino Tempo.

The set collects every single produced by Spector and issued on the Philles label, with the exception of Philles 132, "White Cliffs of Dover" by The Righteous Brothers, which did not chart. Of the catalogue items Philles 100 through 136, the set omits: Philles 101, 103, and 104, produced by Spector's early business partner and label namesake, Lester Sill; Philles 133, produced by Jeff Barry, although its B-side produced by Spector, "When I Saw You," does appear; and Philles 134, produced by Bob Crewe. Philles 105, withdrawn initially in 1962 owing to its controversial subject matter, has also been included. Both "Walking in the Rain" by The Ronettes and "Stumble and Fall" by Darlene Love are listed in most discographies, including the box booklet, as Philles 123. The single "Christmas (Baby Please Come Home)," initially released in 1963 as Philles 119, was re-released the following year as Philles 125 with a different B-side, and did not chart either year. Philles 134 through 136 were not released in the United States; however, there are DJ promo pressings of 136.

In addition to the Philles singles catalogue, the first three discs present Spector productions for other labels, various unreleased material, and two album tracks from Presenting the Fabulous Ronettes featuring Veronica, Philles 4006, and one from River Deep - Mountain High, London HAU 8298 (unreleased Philles 4011). Spector created additional imprints for specific projects, such as the Phil Spector label to promote the solo career of Veronica "Ronnie" Bennett of the Ronettes, the future Mrs. Spector. Some of those items also appear on these discs.

The fourth disc contains the entirety of the Christmas album released on the same day as the JFK assassination, A Christmas Gift for You, purportedly the only long-playing album from his Philles heyday that Spector worked on with the same intensity that he generally lavished on the singles. It peaked at No. 13 on the Christmas Albums chart in 1963, although a reissue in 1972 went to No. 6.

In 2003, the album was ranked No. 64 on Rolling Stone magazine's list of the 500 greatest albums of all time (No. 65 on the revised 2012 list and No. 489 on the revised 2023 list). With the exception of an anthology of his productions for the girl group the Paris Sisters, Back to Mono represents the totality of Spector's singles from this period in print, as of Spring, 2007.

== Track listing ==
All selections were produced by Phil Spector, except for "Spanish Harlem", which was produced by Jerry Leiber and Mike Stoller.

=== Disc One ===
Track	Song title	Artist	Time	Writer(s)	Release date	Chart peak	Catalogue
1.	"To Know Him Is to Love Him"	The Teddy Bears	2:23	Phil Spector	December 1958	No. 1	Dore 503
2.	"Corrine, Corrina"	Ray Peterson	2:40	Mitchell Parish, Bo Chatman, J. Mayo Williams	January 1961	No. 9	Dunes 2002
3.	"Spanish Harlem"	Ben E. King	2:51	Jerry Leiber and Phil Spector	1961	No. 10	Atco 6185
4.	"Pretty Little Angel Eyes"	Curtis Lee	2:45	Tommy Boyce and Curtis Lee	August 1961	No. 7	Dunes 2007
5.	"Every Breath I Take"	Gene Pitney	2:43	Gerry Goffin and Carole King	September 1961	No. 42	Musicor 1011
6.	"I Love How You Love Me"	The Paris Sisters	2:06	Barry Mann and Larry Kolber	October 1961	No. 5	Gregmark 6
7.	"Under the Moon of Love"	Curtis Lee	2:50	Tommy Boyce and Curtis Lee	November 1961	No. 46	Dunes 2008
8.	"There's No Other (Like My Baby)"	The Crystals	2:31	Phil Spector and Leroy Bates	January 1962	No. 20	Philles 100
9.	"Uptown"	The Crystals	2:19	Cynthia Weil and Barry Mann	May 1962	No. 13	Philles 102
10.	"He Hit Me (It Felt Like a Kiss)"	The Crystals	2:32	Gerry Goffin and Carole King	withdrawn		Philles 105
11.	"He's a Rebel"	The Crystals	2:25	Gene Pitney	August 1962	No. 1	Philles 106
12.	"Zip-a-Dee-Doo-Dah"	Bob B. Soxx & the Blue Jeans	2:49	Ray Gilbert and Allie Wrubel	January 1963	No. 8	Philles 107
13.	"Puddin' n' Tain"	The Alley Cats	2:48	Gary Pipkin, Alonzo Willis, Brice Coefield	February 1963	No. 43	Philles 108
14.	"He's Sure the Boy I Love"	The Crystals	2:44	Barry Mann and Cynthia Weil	February 1963	No. 11	Philles 109
15.	"Why Do Lovers Break Each Others Hearts"	Bob B. Soxx & the Blue Jeans	2:48	Ellie Greenwich, Tony Powers, Phil Spector	March 1963	No. 38	Philles 110
16.	"(Today I Met) The Boy I'm Gonna Marry"	Darlene Love	2:48	Greenwich, Powers, Spector	May 1963	No. 39	Philles 111
17.	"Da Doo Ron Ron"	The Crystals	2:17	Ellie Greenwich, Jeff Barry, Phil Spector	June 1963	No. 3	Philles 112
18.	"Heartbreaker"	The Crystals	2:34	Greenwich, Barry, Spector			unreleased
19.	"Why Don't They Let Us Fall in Love"	Veronica	2:39	Greenwich, Barry, Spector			Phil Spector 2
20.	"Chapel of Love"	Darlene Love	2:24	Greenwich, Barry, Spector			unreleased
21.	"Not Too Young to Get Married"	Bob B. Soxx & the Blue Jeans	2:27	Greenwich, Barry, Spector	July 1963	No. 63	Philles 113
22.	"Wait ‘til My Bobby Gets Home"	Darlene Love	2:23	Greenwich, Barry, Spector	September 1963	No. 26	Philles 114
23.	"All Grown Up"	The Crystals	2:49	Greenwich, Barry, Spector	August 1964	No. 98	Philles 122

=== Disc Two ===
Track	Song title	Artist	Time	Writer(s)	Release date	Chart peak	Catalogue
1.	"Be My Baby"	The Ronettes	2:40	Greenwich, Barry, Spector	October 1963	No. 2	Philles 116
2.	"Then He Kissed Me"	The Crystals	2:37	Greenwich, Barry, Spector	September 1963	No. 6	Philles 115
3.	"A Fine Fine Boy"	Darlene Love	2:46	Greenwich, Barry, Spector	November 1963	No. 53	Philles 117
4.	"Baby, I Love You"	The Ronettes	2:50	Greenwich, Barry, Spector	February 1964	No. 24	Philles 118
5.	"I Wonder"	The Ronettes	2:51	Greenwich, Barry, Spector	1964	No. 96	Philles LP 4006
6.	"Girls Can Tell"	The Crystals	2:36	Greenwich, Barry, Spector			unreleased
7.	"Little Boy"	The Crystals	2:59	Greenwich, Barry, Spector	February 1964	No. 92	Philles 119x
8.	"Hold Me Tight"	The Treasures	2:53	John Lennon and Paul McCartney			Shirley 500
9.	"The Best Part of Breakin' Up"	The Ronettes	3:02	Vini Poncia, Pete Andreoli, Phil Spector	May 1964	No. 39	Philles 120
10.	"Soldier Baby Of Mine"	The Ronettes	2:52	Poncia, Andreoli, Spector			unreleased
11.	"Strange Love"	Darlene Love	3:00	Poncia, Andreoli, Spector			Philles 131
12.	"Stumble And Fall"	Darlene Love	2:22	Poncia, Andreoli, Spector	1964		Philles 123
13.	"When I Saw You"	The Ronettes	2:43	Spector	1966		Philles 133b
14.	"So Young"	Veronica	2:36	William Tyus			Phil Spector 1
15.	"Do I Love You?"	The Ronettes	2:50	Poncia, Andreoli, Spector	August 1964	No. 34	Philles 121
16.	"Keep On Dancing"	The Ronettes	2:32	Greenwich, Barry, Spector			unreleased
17.	"You, Baby"	The Ronettes	2:56	Cynthia Weil, Barry Mann, Phil Spector	1964	No. 96	Philles LP 4006
18.	"Woman in Love"	The Ronettes	2:56	Weil, Mann, Spector			unreleased
19.	"Walking in the Rain"	The Ronettes	3:16	Weil, Mann, Spector	December 1964	No. 23	Philles 123

=== Disc Three ===
Track	Song title	Artist	Time	Writer(s)	Release date	Chart peak	Catalogue
1.	"You've Lost That Lovin' Feelin'"	The Righteous Brothers	3:46	Weil, Mann, Spector	December 1964	No. 1	Philles 124
2.	"Born to Be Together"	The Ronettes	2:57	Weil, Mann, Spector	March 1965	No. 52	Philles 126
3.	"Just Once in My Life"	The Righteous Brothers	3:56	Goffin, King, Spector	May 1965	No. 9	Philles 127
4.	"Unchained Melody"	The Righteous Brothers	3:37	Hy Zaret and Alex North	July 1965	No. 4	Philles 129b
5.	"Is This What I Get for Loving You?"	The Ronettes	3:21	Goffin, King, Spector	June 1965	No. 75	Philles 128
6.	"Long Way to Be Happy"	Darlene Love	2:48	Gerry Goffin and Carole King			unreleased
7.	"(I Love You) For Sentimental Reasons"	The Righteous Brothers	2:47	Deek Watson and William Best	January 1966		Philles 130b
8.	"Ebb Tide"	The Righteous Brothers	2:48	Carl Sigman and Robert Maxwell	January 1966	No. 5	Philles 130
9.	"This Could Be the Night"	The Modern Folk Quartet	2:39	Harry Nilsson and Phil Spector			unreleased
10.	"Paradise"	The Ronettes	3:37	Perry Botkin Jr., Gil Garfield, Nilsson, Spector			unreleased
11.	"River Deep - Mountain High"	Ike & Tina Turner	3:35	Greenwich, Barry, Spector	June 1966	No. 88	Philles 131
12.	"I'll Never Need More Than This"	Ike & Tina Turner	3:27	Greenwich, Barry, Spector	February 1967	No. 114	Philles 135
13.	"A Love Like Yours (Don't Come Knockin' Everyday)"	Ike & Tina Turner	2:57	Eddie Holland, Lamont Dozier, Brian Holland	June 1967	No. 16 (UK)	Philles 136
14.	"Save the Last Dance for Me"	Ike & Tina Turner	2:47	Doc Pomus and Mort Shuman	September 1966	No. 27 (UK)	Philles LP 4011 (unreleased) London HAU 8298
15.	"I Wish I Never Saw the Sunshine"	The Ronettes	3:49	Greenwich, Barry, Spector			unreleased
16.	"You Came, You Saw, You Conquered"	The Ronettes	2:49	Toni Wine, Irwin Levine, Spector			A&M 1040
17.	"Black Pearl"	Sonny Charles and the Checkmates, Ltd.	3:19	Wine, Levine, Spector	July 1969	No. 13	A&M 1053
18.	"Love Is All I Have to Give"	The Checkmates, Ltd.	4:09	Bobby Stephens and Phil Spector	May 1969	No. 65	A&M 1039

=== Disc Four: A Christmas Gift for You ===
Initially released as Philles 4005, November 22, 1963

Track	Song title	Artist	Writer(s)	Time
1.	"White Christmas"	Darlene Love	Irving Berlin	2:52
2.	"Frosty the Snowman"	The Ronettes	Steve Nelson and Walter Rollins	2:16
3.	"The Bells of St. Mary"	Bob B. Soxx & the Blue Jeans	A. Emmett Adams and Douglas Furber	2:54
4.	"Santa Claus Is Coming to Town"	The Crystals	J. Fred Coots and Haven Gillespie	3:24
5.	"Sleigh Ride"	The Ronettes	Leroy Anderson and Mitchell Parish	3:00
6.	"Marshmallow World"	Darlene Love	Carl Sigman and Peter DeRose	2:23
7.	"I Saw Mommy Kissing Santa Claus"	The Ronettes	Tommie Connor	2:37
8.	"Rudolph the Red-Nosed Reindeer"	The Crystals	Johnny Marks	2:30
9.	"Winter Wonderland"	Darlene Love	Felix Bernard and Dick Smith	2:25
10.	"Parade of the Wooden Soldiers"	The Crystals	Leon Jessel	2:55
11.	"Christmas (Baby Please Come Home)"	Darlene Love	Ellie Greenwich, Jeff Barry and Phil Spector	2:45
12.	"Here Comes Santa Claus"	Bob B. Soxx & the Blue Jeans	Gene Autry and Oakley Haldeman	2:03
13.	"Silent Night"	Phil Spector and Artists	Josef Mohr and Franz X. Gruber	2:08

== Certifications ==
Region	Certification	Certified units/sales
United States (RIAA)	Gold	500,000^{^}
^{^} Shipments figures based on certification alone.
