= He's a Rebel (album) =

Studio album by the Crystals
- Released: February 1963
- Recorded: 1961–1963
- Genre: Pop; R&B
- Length: 30:36
- Label: Philles; PHLP 4001
- Producer: Phil Spector

The Crystals chronology
| Twist Uptown (1962) | He's a Rebel (1963) | Sing the Greatest Hits, Vol. I (1963) |

Professional ratings
Review scores
| Source | Rating |
|---|---|
| Record Mirror | 5/5 stars |

He's a Rebel is the second studio album by girl group the Crystals, and also the second LP in the Philles catalogue. It was released in February 1963, as an effort to take an advantage of the monster hit "He's a Rebel", which went to number 1 US in 1962. The song was actually recorded by the Blossoms with Darlene Love on lead vocals and attributed to the Crystals. Notably on the LP is "He Hit Me (It Felt Like a Kiss)," a withdrawn single by the "real" Crystals group.

== Overview ==
This was a repackaging of Twist Uptown, the Crystals' debut. Two of the original eleven tracks were taken from that album and replaced with "He's a Rebel" and its follow-up "He's Sure the Boy I Love" (number 11 US, also recorded with the Blossoms) while "He Hit Me" was added for a twelfth track. The He's a Rebel album peaked at number 131 US.

== Track listing ==
=== Side one ===
1. "He's a Rebel" (Gene Pitney) (2:25)
2. "Uptown" (Barry Mann, Cynthia Weil) (2:18)
3. "Another Country-Another World" (Doc Pomus, Phil Spector) (3:00)
4. "Frankenstein Twist" (Kate Henry, Leo McCorkle) (2:47)
5. "Oh Yeah, Maybe Baby" (Hank Hunter, Spector) (2:23)
6. "He's Sure the Boy I Love" (Mann, Weil) (2:29)

=== Side two ===
1. "There's No Other (Like My Baby)" (Leroy Bates, Spector) (2:28)
2. "On Broadway" (Mann, Weil) (2:27)
3. "What a Nice Way to Turn Seventeen" (Jack Keller), Larry Kolber) (2:40)
4. "No One Ever Tells You" (Carole King, Gerry Goffin, Spector) (2:16)
5. "He Hit Me (It Felt Like a Kiss)" (King, Goffin) (2:28)
6. "I Love You Eddie" (Hunter, Spector) (2:55)

== Personnel ==
- Barbara Alston (with the Crystals) – vocals
- Hal Blaine – drums
- LaLa Brooks (with the Crystals) – vocals, "Frankenstein Twist"
- Steve Douglas – saxophone
- Dee Dee Kenniebrew – vocals
- Darlene Love (with the Blossoms) – vocals, "He's a Rebel" and "He's Sure the Boy I Love"
- Mike Spencer – piano
- Mary Thomas – vocals
- Patricia "Patsy" Wright (with the Crystals) – vocals, "Oh Yeah, Maybe Baby"

== Singles history ==
- "There's No Other (Like My Baby)"/"Oh Yeah, Maybe Baby" (number 20 US)
- "Uptown"/"What a Nice Way to Turn Seventeen" (number 13 US)
- "He Hit Me (It Felt Like a Kiss)"/"No One Ever Tells You" (withdrawn)
- "He's a Rebel"/"I Love You Eddie" (number 1 US)
- "He's Sure the Boy I Love"/"Walkin' Along (La-La-La)" (number 11 US)

== Charts ==
| Chart (1963) | Peak position |
|---|---|
| US Billboard Top LPs | 131 |
