= Twist Uptown =

Album by the Crystals

Studio album by the Crystals
- Released: August 1962
- Recorded: 1961–1962
- Genre: Pop; R&B
- Length: 27:00
- Label: Philles PHLP 4000
- Producer: Phil Spector

The Crystals chronology
Twist Uptown (1962)	He's a Rebel (1963)

Singles from Twisted Uptown
- 1. "There's No Other (Like My Baby)" Released: October 1961; 2. "Uptown" Released: February 14, 1962

Twist Uptown is the first studio album by the Crystals, as well as the first album issued on Philles Records. It was released in August 1962 to capitalize upon their success with the Cynthia Weil and Barry Mann composition "Uptown" which was a #13 US hit, and their first top forty hit "There's No Other (Like My Baby)" (#20 US). Twist Uptown notably features the first released version of "On Broadway," a composition written by Cynthia Weil and Barry Mann. The song was later modified by Jerry Leiber and Mike Stoller and became a hit for The Drifters in 1963.

Barbara Alston was The Crystals' main lead singer at the time, and the only songs from this album not to feature her on lead are "Oh Yeah, Maybe Baby" on which Patricia "Patsy" Wright sang lead; and "Gee Whiz" and "Frankenstein Twist" which featured Dolores "LaLa" Brooks. During this period, The Crystals appeared as a quintet but this album features the vocals of six Crystals; it contains tracks with original member Myrna Giraud as well as Dolores "LaLa" Brooks who was Giraud's permanent replacement by its release. Recording sessions took place mainly at Aldon Music and Mirasound in late 1961 and early 1962.

In 1963, the album was repackaged as He's a Rebel to benefit from their hit of the same name (although the song was really recorded by The Blossoms) and the two tracks that were omitted were "Please Hurt Me" and "Gee Whiz Look at his Eyes (Twist)."

== Track listing ==
Side one

1. "Uptown"- (Barry Mann/Cynthia Weil) - 02:33
2. "Another Country-Another World"- (Spector/Pomus) - 03:06
3. "Frankenstein Twist"- (Henry/McCorkle) - 03:01
4. "Oh Yeah, Maybe Baby"- (Spector/Hunter) - 02:28
5. "Please Hurt Me"- (King/Goffin) - 02:16

Side two

1. "There's No Other (Like My Baby)"- (Spector/Bates) - 02:31
2. "On Broadway"- (Weil/Mann/Leiber/Stoller) - 02:31
3. "What a Nice Way to Turn Seventeen"- (Kolber/Keller) - 02:42
4. "No One Ever Tells You"- (Spector/King/Goffin) - 02:21
5. "Gee Whiz Look at His Eyes (Twist)"- (Thomas) - 02:47
6. "I Love You Eddie"- (Spector/Hunter) - 01:58

== Personnel ==
- Barbara Alston - Lead vocals (backing vocals on "Oh Yeah, Maybe Baby", "Gee Whiz", and "Frankenstein Twist")
- Patricia "Patsy" Wright - Backing vocals (lead vocals on "Oh Yeah, Maybe Baby")
- Myrna Giraud - Backing vocals
- Dolores "Dee Dee" Kenniebrew - Backing vocals
- Dolores "LaLa" Brooks - Backing vocals (lead vocals on "Gee Whiz" and "Frankenstein Twist")
- Mary Thomas - Backing vocals
- Phil Spector - Producer

== Singles history ==
- "There's No Other (Like My Baby)"/"Oh Yeah, Maybe Baby"- (#20 US)
- "Uptown"/"What A Nice Way to Turn Seventeen"- (#13 US)

== Critical reception ==
Pig River Records reviewed 'Twist Uptown' on its 50th anniversary giving the record 7.1/10 stating the album "epitomizes this contradiction of innocent purity with a borderline lack of imagination."
