= He's Sure the Boy I Love =

Single by the Crystals

from the album He's a Rebel
- B-side: "Walkin' Along (La La La)"
- Released: 1962
- Studio: Gold Star, Los Angeles
- Genre: Rock; soul
- Length: 2:17
- Label: Philles
- Songwriters: Barry Mann, Cynthia Weil
- Producer: Phil Spector

The Crystals singles chronology
"He's a Rebel" (1962)	"He's Sure the Boy I Love" (1962)	"Da Doo Ron Ron" (1963)

"He's Sure the Boy I Love" is a 1962 single by the Crystals. It was originally recorded by the Blossoms but credited to the Crystals. On the Billboard charts in 1963, "He's Sure the Boy I Love" peaked at No. 11 on the Billboard Hot 100 and No. 18 on the Hot R&B Singles chart.

== Background ==
In 1962, the Blossoms recorded "He's a Rebel" with Phil Spector. Instead of crediting the song to the Blossoms, Spector released the song under the Crystals without informing the group while they were on tour. After "He's a Rebel" became a hit song, Spector brought the Blossoms back to record "He's Sure the Boy I Love".

== Recording and release ==
While the Crystals were on tour, Darlene Love of the Blossoms was asked by Phil Spector to record "He's Sure the Boy I Love". After being discredited from "He's a Rebel", Love urged Spector to give her a royalty contract with a rate of three cents per record. The track was recorded at Gold Star Studios in Los Angeles in November 1962. The Wrecking Crew played a Jack Nitzsche arrangement, Larry Levine was the engineer.

"He's Sure the Boy I Love" was featured on the Crystals' re-released album He's a Rebel and replaced a prior track of theirs that had originally appeared on Twist Uptown. The song was released on Philles Records.

=== Controversy ===
After discovering that Spector had once again discredited the Blossoms from their recording and given their song to the Crystals, Darlene Love got into a confrontation with Spector. Similarly, the Crystals were angry at Spector for having them sing another song on tour that was not theirs. Cynthia Weil, who co-wrote the song with her husband Barry Mann, was unaware that Darlene Love had sung on the track. To sound like Love, lead singer of the Crystals La La Brooks rehearsed the introduction of "He's Sure the Boy I Love" in a Californian accent.

== Reception ==
Billboard magazine called "He's Sure the Boy I Love" a successful song that had a "rousing ork backing". Cash Box described it as a "change-of-pace’r...[that] finds the gals in top rockin’ mashed potatoes form" and has a "terrific Jack Nitzsche arrangement.."

== Chart performance ==
In February 1963, the song peaked at No. 18 on the Hot R&B Singles chart and No. 11 on the Billboard Hot 100.
