= Da Doo Ron Ron =

1963 single by The Crystals

"Da Doo Ron Ron (When He Walked Me Home)"
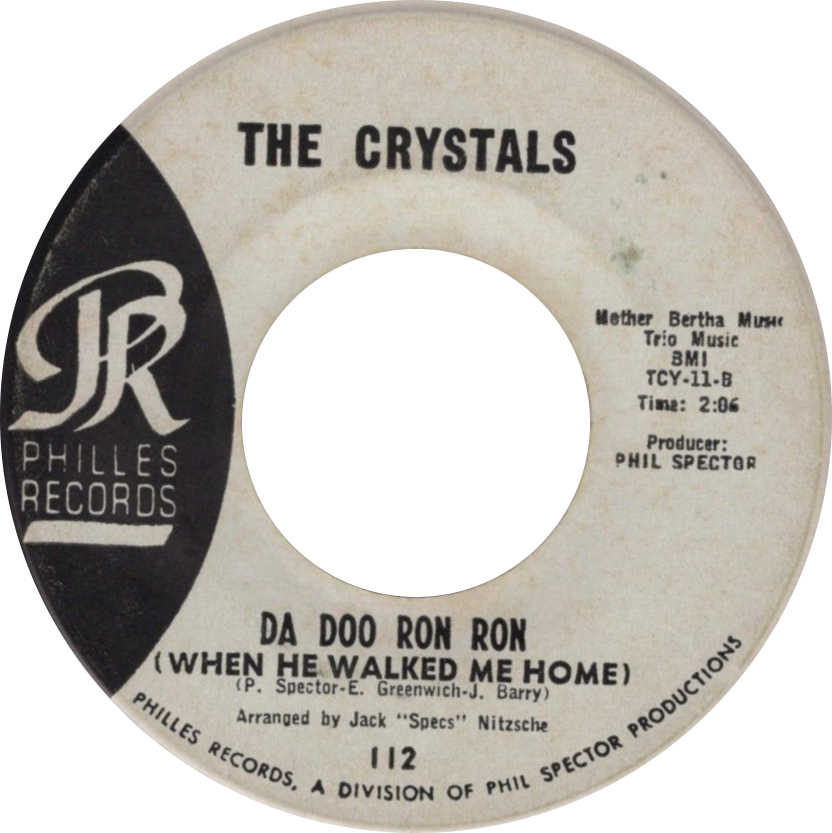
- One of side-A labels of the US single

Single by the Crystals
- B-side: "Git' It"
- Released: April 1963
- Recorded: March 1963
- Genre: R&B, pop, rock and roll
- Length: 2:18
- Label: Philles
- Songwriters: Phil Spector; Jeff Barry; Ellie Greenwich
- Producer: Phil Spector

The Crystals singles chronology
"He's Sure the Boy I Love" (1962)	"Da Doo Ron Ron (When He Walked Me Home)" (1963)	"Then He Kissed Me" (1963)

Official audio
- "Da Doo Ron Ron" on YouTube

"Da Doo Ron Ron (When He Walked Me Home)" is a song written by Jeff Barry, Ellie Greenwich and Phil Spector. It first became a popular top five hit single for the American girl group the Crystals in 1963. American teen idol Shaun Cassidy recorded the song in 1977 and his version hit number one on the Billboard Hot 100 chart. There have also been many other cover versions of this song, including one by the songwriters Jeff Barry and Ellie Greenwich themselves, performing as the Raindrops.

== Composition ==
The song is the first collaboration in songwriting by Jeff Barry, Ellie Greenwich and Phil Spector. The song was composed over two days in Spector's office in New York. The title "Da Doo Ron Ron" was initially just nonsense syllables used as dummy line to separate each stanza and chorus until proper lyrics could be written, but Spector liked it so much that he kept it. Phil Spector did not want lyrics that were too cerebral and would interfere with a simple boy-meets-girl story line. The rhymes of the opening lines, "I met him on a Monday and my heart stood still ... Somebody told me that his name was Bill" was inspired by Bill Walsh, a friend of Spector who happened to visit Spector while the three were writing the song.

== The Crystals' original version ==
=== Background ===
"The Crystals" (actually Dolores "LaLa" Brooks (of The Crystals), The Blossoms and other session musicians ) recorded "Da Doo Ron Ron" in March 1963 at Gold Star Studios in Los Angeles. It was produced by Phil Spector in his Wall of Sound style. Jack Nitzsche was the arranger and Larry Levine the engineer. The drummer was Hal Blaine. Dolores "LaLa" Brooks was the lead vocalist. Brooks told the syndicated radio program Solid Gold Weekend that Cher was one of the singers backing her lead vocals. According to session vocalist Darlene Love of The Blossoms, Spector originally had her (Love) sing lead on the song in the studio, but he decided to record it with Brooks on lead vocals at the last minute.

On June 8, 1963, it reached number three on the Billboard Hot 100, and on June 22, 1963, number four on the Cash Box chart. It also reached number five in the UK.

That's gold. That's solid gold coming out of that speaker.

— Spector to Sonny Bono, after listening to the final playback of "Da Doo Ron Ron".

Cash Box said that the song "relates the joy of a gal who has found THE guy, and it's done with appropriate good rock feeling," calling it a "solid follow-up to" the Crystals' previous hit "He's Sure the Boy I Love."

In 2004, the Crystals' song was ranked number 114 on Rolling Stone's list of The 500 Greatest Songs of All Time. It was, however, removed from the same list in the 2010 update, being the highest-ranked of the 26 songs that were removed. But it was reinstated at No. 366 in the 2021 update. It was listed at number 528 by Q Magazine in their list of The 1001 Best Songs Ever, published in 2003. Berlin Media listed the song at number 43 on their list of The 100 Best Singles of All Time list published in 1998. It was also recognized by the Rock and Roll Hall of Fame as one of the "500 Songs That Shaped Rock". Billboard named the song number 55 on their list of 100 Greatest Girl Group Songs of All Time.

=== Charts ===
Chart (1963)	Peak position
Canada (CHUM Hit Parade)	3
Ireland (IRMA)	3
South Africa (RiSA)	2
UK Singles (OCC)	5
US Billboard Hot 100	3
US Cash Box Top 100	4
West Germany (GfK)	22

== Shaun Cassidy version ==
"Da Doo Ron Ron"
- US single picture sleeve

Single by Shaun Cassidy

from the album Shaun Cassidy
- B-side: "Holiday"
- Released: March 1977
- Recorded: 1976
- Genre: Bubblegum pop
- Length: 2:50
- Label: Warner/Curb
- Songwriters: Phil Spector; Jeff Barry; Ellie Greenwich
- Producer: Michael Lloyd

Shaun Cassidy singles chronology
"Be My Baby" (1977)	"Da Doo Ron Ron" (1977)	"That's Rock 'n' Roll" (1977)

=== Background ===
"Da Doo Ron Ron" was covered in 1977 by teen idol Shaun Cassidy on his first solo LP, Shaun Cassidy, launching his career. His version was produced by Michael Lloyd and issued on Warner. It peaked at number one on the U.S. Billboard Hot 100. (The words were changed slightly to make it a boy-girl song, after The Searchers' cover version.) The song was his first of three consecutive Top 10 U.S. hits. Cassidy's cover of "Da Doo Ron Ron" spent 22 weeks on the chart. It became a gold record, as did all of Cassidy's first three single releases.

=== Charts ===
==== Weekly charts ====
Chart (1977)	Peak position
Australia (Kent Music Report)	36
Canada Top Singles (RPM)	1
Canada Adult Contemporary (RPM)	39
New Zealand	36
US Billboard Hot 100	1
US Adult Contemporary (Billboard)	33
US Cash Box Top 100	1
West Germany (GfK)	19

==== Year-end charts ====
Chart (1977)	Rank
Canada (RPM)	10
US Billboard Hot 100	45
US Cash Box Top 100	47

== Johnny Hallyday version (in French) ==
"Da dou ron ron"

Single by Johnny Hallyday

from the album Le Pénitencier
- B-side: "Comme une ombre sur moi"
- Released: June 29, 1963
- Genre: R&B, pop, rock and roll
- Length: 2:18
- Label: Philips
- Songwriters: Ellie Greenwich, Jeff Barry, Phil Spector
- Producer: Lee Hallyday

Johnny Hallyday singles chronology
"Les Bras en croix" / "Quitte-moi doucement" / "Quand un air vous possède" / "Quitte-moi doucement" / "Quand un air vous possède" / "Dis-moi oui" (1963)	"Da dou ron ron" (1963)	"Ma guitare" (1963)

Audio
- "Da dou ron ron" on YouTube

The song was covered in French by Johnny Hallyday. His version (titled "Da dou ron ron") was released in June 1963 and spent 12 weeks at no. 1 on the singles sales chart in France (from July 7 to September 13 and from September 21 to October 11). In Wallonia (French speaking Belgium) his single spent 24 weeks on the chart, peaking at number 2.

=== Charts ===
Chart (1963)	Peak position
Belgium (Ultratop 50 Wallonia)	2
France (singles sales)	1
West Germany (GfK)	29
Chart (2000)	Peak position
France (SNEP)	37

== Sylvie Vartan version ==
"Da dou ron ron"

Single by Sylvie Vartan

from the album Shang shang a lang
- B-side: "Rock'n'roll man"
- Released: November 1974
- Recorded: Fall 1974
- Genre: Country rock
- Length: 2:47
- Label: RCA
- Songwriters: Ellie Greenwich, Jeff Barry, Phil Spector
- Producer: Jean Renard

Sylvie Vartan singles chronology
"Bye bye Leroy Brown" (1974)	"Da dou ron ron" (1974)	"Shang shang a lang" (1974)

Music video
- "Da dou ron ron" on YouTube

The French adaptation was covered 11 years later by Sylvie Vartan (Hallyday's then wife) for her 1974 studio album "Shang shang a lang", featuring two covers of her then-husband's songs, produced by Veteran French producer Jean Renard. The B-Side to Vartan's version is an English-language cover of Hallyday's song, "Rock'n'roll man", also featured on the aforementioned album, of whom Hallyday's version was released around the same time, being featured on Hallyday's 1974 studio album "Rock 'n' Slow", also produced by Renard. Vartan's version peaked at number 48 on the Wallonia Charts on December 28, 1974. Vartan and Hallyday also performed the song together on French TV on June 21, 1975.

=== Charts ===
Chart (1974)	Peak position
Belgium (Ultratop 50 Wallonia)	48

== Other versions ==
- Swedish singer Claes Dieden recorded a version of the song and released in as a single in early 1969; it became a large hit in Sweden, reaching number number 1 on Tio i Topp and number number 2 on sales chart Kvällstoppen.
- Ian Matthews recorded an a cappella version of the song for his 1971 album Tigers Will Survive: issued as a single in January 1972 the track afforded Matthews his Billboard Hot 100 debut as a solo act albeit with a number 96 peak, and number 68 in Canada.
- Australian Debra Byrne released a single of "Da Doo Ron Ron" in 1974, which peaked at number 29 on the Australian Kent Music Report. The song is included on her debut studio album, She's a Rebel.
- The Beach Boys recorded a version (with Carl Wilson on lead vocals) in 1979 during the sessions for their 1980 album Keepin' the Summer Alive; however, it remained unreleased until 2013, when it was included in the box set Made in California. Their version is gender-swapped, sung from a male's perspective; "Bill" is changed to "Jill".
- Carpenters recorded a cover version which appeared on their 1973 album Now & Then.
- In 1993, on the album 3 Way Split with Spoke and Bombshell, Less Than Jake included a cover of the song before playing their song Last Train after in the studio version. This is nowhere to be found when played live.
- In 1997, in his song Hypnotize, The Notorious B.I.G. makes a reference to this song with the line: “Your crew run-run-run, your crew run-run.”.

== See also ==
- "Car Crazy Cutie", a 1963 Beach Boys song with similar nonsense syllables.
- National League North side Southport FC come out to the Crystals' version of this song on matchdays.
