= I'll Never Need More Than This =

Single by Ike & Tina Turner

from the album River Deep – Mountain High
- B-side: "The Cash Box Blues"
- Released: May 1967 (US); September 1967 (UK)
- Recorded: 1966
- Studio: Gold Star Studios, (Los Angeles, California)
- Genre: Soul; pop
- Label: Philles (US); London (UK)
- Songwriters: Phil Spector; Jeff Barry; Ellie Greenwich
- Producer: Phil Spector

Ike & Tina Turner singles chronology
"I Wish My Dream Would Come True" (1967)	"I'll Never Need More Than This" (1967)	"A Love Like Yours (Don't Come Knocking Everyday)" (1967)

"I'll Never Need More Than This" is a single by R&B duo Ike & Tina Turner released on Philles Records in 1967. The song was included on the 1969 reissue of the album River Deep – Mountain High.

== Recording and release ==
"I'll Never Need More Than This" was recorded by Tina Turner at Gold Star Studios during the session for the album River Deep – Mountain High in 1966. The song was written by Phil Spector, Jeff Barry, and Ellie Greenwich. It was arranged by Jack "Specs" Nitzsche, and produced by Spector using his "Wall of Sound" production technique. "I'll Never Need More Than This" was released as a non-album track on Philles Records in May 1967. Due to the disappointing chart performance of the single "River Deep – Mountain High" in the US, the album was only released on London Records in the UK. When River Deep – Mountain High was reissued in the US in 1969, "I'll Never Need More Than This" was included on the album.

Tina Turner promoted the single on American Bandstand in 1967. It reached No. 114 on Bubbling Under The Hot 100.

The B-side "The Cash Box Blues (Oops, We Printed The Wrong Story Again)" is an instrumental composed by Spector and featuring The Ike Turner Band.

== Track listing ==
US single
No.	Title	Writer(s)	Length
1.	"I'll Never Need More Than This (Edit)"	P. Spector, J. Barry, E. Greenwich	3:15
2.	"The Cash Box Blues (Oops, We Printed The Wrong Story Again)"	Phil Spector	2:00

UK single
No.	Title	Writer(s)	Length
1.	"I'll Never Need More Than This"	Spector, Barry, Greenwich	3:15
2.	"Save the Last Dance for Me"	Pomus, Shuman

== Chart performance ==
Chart (1967)	Peak position
US Billboard Bubbling Under Hot 100	114
US Record World Singles Coming Up	105

== Covers ==
- Ellie Greenwich, who co-wrote the song, recorded a rendition for her 1968 album Ellie Greenwich Composes, Produces and Sings.
