= Philles Records =

American record label (active 1961–1969)

- Parent company: EMI Music Publishing (Sony Music Publishing)
- Founded: 1961
- Founder: Phil Spector, Lester Sill
- Defunct: 1969
- Status: Defunct
- Distributor: Legacy Recordings
- Genre: Pop, R&B, Blue-eyed soul
- Country of origin: United States
- Location: Los Angeles, California

Philles Records was an American record label formed in 1961 by Phil Spector and Lester Sill, the label taking its name from a hybrid of their first names. Initially, the label was distributed by Jamie/Guyden in Philadelphia. (Note: Jamie labels used an unusual and distinctive matrix number system, consisting of a code representing the artist followed by the number of the artist's recording. For example "TCY" was short for "The Crystals" on Philles. "DE" was short for "Duane Eddy" on Jamie. Sometimes Philles matrix numbers had a P or PH prefix.) In 1962, Spector purchased Sill's stock to become sole owner at 22 years of age, America's youngest label chief at the time.

== Founding and background ==
The label issued 12 albums over the course of its existence, but with the exception of A Christmas Gift for You, the focus was always on the single. However, Philles X-125 is a reissue of Philles 119, and X-125 exists with two different B-side tracks, as "Winter Wonderland" (1964) and "Winter Blues" (1965) were substituted for the original flipside, "Harry and Milt Meet Hal B" (1963). "Harry and Milt" and many other flipsides were deliberately undistinguished instrumentals, which were intended to focus attention on the A-sides. These B-sides were originally credited to the A-side artists, but later pieces were credited to the Phil Spector Group. Also, most discographies, including the one in the Back to Mono booklet, list two items with catalogue number Philles 123. "Stumble And Fall" by Darlene Love was released and then withdrawn (both stock and promos exist) in August 1964 (according to Billboard magazine). Its number was replaced with "Walking in the Rain" by The Ronettes, which came out that October. Philles 111 also has two B-sides: "My Heart Beat a Little Bit Faster" and "Playing for Keeps." The last few singles (134, 135, and 136) received much less airplay than their predecessors. Although singles 134 and 135 were "charted" by Billboard, single 136 did not—although both promo and regular stock copies exist. The promotion-only single "(Let's Dance) The Screw" by The Crystals is known only in the form of a handful of promotional copies and one stock copy.

After the chart failures of the last few singles, Phil Spector stopped producing and releasing new records on Philles. In the summer of 1966, he signed Bob Crewe and Jeff Barry to produce The Ronettes and Ike & Tina Turner. The label effectively ceased operations in 1967, and Spector did not return to production work for another two years. There was one more Philles record, The Phil Spector Spectacular. It was released only to radio stations in 1972, along with a letter from Phil. The Philles catalog is now administered by Sony Music Publishing, which acquired the catalogue when it bought EMI Music Publishing, with Sony Music's Legacy Recordings imprint handling distribution rights for the Philles catalog through a new licensing deal which was finalized in September 2009. Prior to this deal, the Philles reissues were handled by ABKCO Records.

=== Production ===
The singles were produced by Spector, with five and one half exceptions: Philles 101, 103, and 104 were produced by Lester Sill prior to his departure from the company; Philles 133 by Jeff Barry; Philles 134 by Bob Crewe; and the B-side of Philles 136 was produced by Ike Turner. For years, The Righteous Brothers' Bill Medley has insisted that he produced "Unchained Melody" (Philles 129) but that has never been confirmed: as an album track for Just Once in My Life, Spector delegated production of such tracks to Medley. As the B-side to "Hung On You", early presses did not specify its producer on the label – Spector usually produced throwaway instrumentals on the B-side to focus on the A-side. When the track boomed in popularity, Spector eventually opted to claim credit in later presses.

Of the non-Spector productions, only "I Can Hear Music" charted and it rose no higher than 100th place. Every one of Spector's productions made the charts in the U.S., with the exceptions of Philles 136, one of the two Philles 123's, the withdrawn Philles 105, and the holiday single both times. Eighteen Philles records made the Top 40, the label topping the charts twice with Philles 106 in 1962, and again with Philles 124 in 1965.

== Notable artists ==
- The Crystals
- Darlene Love
- Bob B. Soxx & the Blue Jeans
- The Ronettes
- The Righteous Brothers
- Ike & Tina Turner

== Singles discography ==
Catalogue	Release date	Hot 100 Chart peak	Song title	Writer(s)	Artist	Time
Philles 100	10/61	#20	There's No Other (Like My Baby)	Phil Spector and Leroy Bates	The Crystals	2:31
Philles 101	3/62		Here I Stand	Tony Mottola	Joel Scott	
Philles 102	3/62	#13	Uptown	Cynthia Weil and Barry Mann	The Crystals	2:19
Philles 103	/62		Malagueña	Ernesto Lecuona	Ali Hassan	
Philles 104	6/62		Lt. Colonel Bogey's Parade	Lester Sill	Steve Douglas and His Merry Men	
Philles 105	7/62	withdrawn	He Hit Me (It Felt Like A Kiss)	Gerry Goffin and Carole King	The Crystals	2:32
Philles 106	9/62	#1	He's A Rebel	Gene Pitney	The Crystals	2:25
Philles 107	10/62	#8	Zip-a-Dee-Doo-Dah	Ray Gilbert and Allie Wrubel	Bob B. Soxx & the Blue Jeans	2:49
Philles 108	1/63	#43	Puddin' N' Tain	Gary Pipkin, Alonzo Willis, Brice Coefield	The Alley Cats	2:48
Philles 109	12/62	#11	He's Sure the Boy I Love	Barry Mann and Cynthia Weil	The Crystals	2:44
Philles 110	1/63	#38	Why Do Lovers Break Each Others Hearts	Ellie Greenwich, Tony Powers, Phil Spector	Bob B. Soxx & the Blue Jeans	2:48
Philles 111	Early 63	special use only	(Let's Dance) The Screw, Part 1	Spector	The Crystals	
Philles 111	4/63	#39	(Today I Met) The Boy I'm Gonna Marry	Greenwich, Powers, Spector	Darlene Love	2:48
Philles 112	4/63	#3	Da Doo Ron Ron	Ellie Greenwich, Jeff Barry, Phil Spector	The Crystals	2:17
Philles 113	5/63	#63	Not Too Young to Get Married	Greenwich, Barry, Spector	Bob B. Soxx & the Blue Jeans	2:27
Philles 114	7/63	#26	Wait ‘til My Bobby Gets Home	Greenwich, Barry, Spector	Darlene Love	2:23
Philles 115	8/63	#6	Then He Kissed Me	Greenwich, Barry, Spector	The Crystals	2:37
Philles 116	8/63	#2	Be My Baby	Greenwich, Barry, Spector	The Ronettes	2:40
Philles 117	10/63	#53	A Fine Fine Boy	Greenwich, Barry, Spector	Darlene Love	2:46
Philles 118	12/63	#24	Baby, I Love You	Greenwich, Barry, Spector	The Ronettes	2:50
Philles 119	11/63		Christmas (Baby Please Come Home)	Greenwich, Barry, Spector	Darlene Love	2:45
Philles 119x	1/64	#92	Little Boy	Greenwich, Barry, Spector	The Crystals	2:59
Philles 120	4/64	#39	The Best Part of Breakin' Up	Vini Poncia, Pete Andreoli, Phil Spector	The Ronettes	3:02
Philles 121	6/64	#34	Do I Love You?	Poncia, Andreoli, Spector	The Ronettes	2:50
Philles 122	7/64	#98	All Grown Up	Greenwich, Barry, Spector	The Crystals	2:49
Philles 123	8/64	withdrawn	Stumble And Fall	Poncia, Andreoli, Spector	Darlene Love	2:22
Philles 123	10/17/64	#23	Walking in the Rain	Weil, Mann, Spector	The Ronettes	3:16
Philles 124	11/64	#1	You've Lost That Lovin' Feelin'	Weil, Mann, Spector	The Righteous Brothers	3:46
Philles X-125	12/64		Christmas (Baby Please Come Home)	Greenwich, Barry, Spector	Darlene Love	2:45
Philles 126	2/65	#52	Born to Be Together	Weil, Mann, Spector	The Ronettes	2:57
Philles 127	4/65	#9	Just Once in My Life	Goffin, King, Spector	The Righteous Brothers	3:56
Philles 128	5/65	#75	Is This What I Get for Loving You?	Goffin, King, Spector	The Ronettes	3:21
Philles 129	7/65	#4	Unchained Melody (originally B side to "Hung On You")	Hy Zaret and Alex North / "Hung on You" by Gerry Goffin, Carole King and Phil Spector	The Righteous Brothers	3:37
Philles 130	11/65	#5	Ebb Tide	Carl Sigman and Robert Maxwell	The Righteous Brothers	2:48
Philles 131	5/66	#88	River Deep – Mountain High	Greenwich, Barry, Spector	Ike and Tina Turner	3:40
Philles 132	10/66	#118	White Cliffs of Dover	Walter Kent and Nat Burton	The Righteous Brothers	2:20
Philles 133	10/66	#100	I Can Hear Music	Greenwich, Barry, Spector	The Ronettes	3:00
Philles 134	10/66		Two to Tango	Dick Manning, Al Hoffman	Ike and Tina Turner	2:45
Philles 135	5/67	#114	I'll Never Need More Than This	Greenwich, Barry, Spector	Ike and Tina Turner	3:27
Philles 136	8/67		A Love Like Yours (Don't Come Knockin' Everyday)	Eddie Holland, Lamont Dozier, Brian Holland	Ike and Tina Turner	2:57

== Albums discography ==
Catalogue	Release date	Chart peak	Album title	Artist	Time
PHLP-4000	8/62		Twist Uptown	The Crystals	
PHLP-4001	2/63	#131	He's a Rebel	The Crystals	
PHLP-4002	2/63		Zip-a-Dee-Doo-Dah	Bob B. Soxx & the Blue Jeans	
PHLP-4003	7/63		Sing the Greatest Hits, Vol. I	The Crystals	
PHLP-4004	10/63		Philles Records Present Today's Hits	Various Artists	
PHLP-4005	11/22/63	#13	A Christmas Gift for You	Various Artists	34:12
PHLP-4006	11/64	#96	Presenting the Fabulous Ronettes featuring Veronica	The Ronettes	
PHLP-4007	1/65	#4	You've Lost That Lovin' Feelin'	The Righteous Brothers	
PHLP-4008	6/65	#9	Just Once in My Life	The Righteous Brothers	
PHLP-4009	12/65	#16	Back to Back	The Righteous Brothers	
PHLP-4010	1/66		Lenny Bruce Is Out Again	Lenny Bruce	
PHLP-4011 (Note: Only a few copies of the album were pressed, and covers never made, before it was canceled by Philles. This LP was released with slightly different content on A&M Records in 1969. Only a few copies of LP-4011 were pressed, and covers never printed, before it was canceled by Philles. By popular demand, Phil Spector released the album in the United Kingdom, with liner notes written by Decca's promotion man, Tony Hall. Hall included a quote from Spector reading, "We can only assume that England is more appreciative of talent and exciting music than the U.S..")	9/66	unissued	River Deep - Mountain High	Ike and Tina Turner	
PHLP-100	1972	DJ only	The Phil Spector Spectacular	Various Artists	

Albums 4007, 4008, and 4009 were issued simultaneously in stereo with an ST- prefix. The Monarch job number for ST-4006 indicates that the stereo release of this album came in July 1966. Album 4000 was released in mono only in 1962. It was released through the Capitol Record Club in both mono and rechanneled stereo. Based on the catalog number of the record club issue, that release was in late 1966.

== See also ==
- Phi-Dan Records
- Warner-Spector Records
- List of record labels
