= Just Once in My Life (song) =

1965 single by The Righteous Brothers

- US picture sleeve

Single by the Righteous Brothers

from the album Just Once in My Life
- B-side: "The Blues"
- Released: April 1965
- Genre: Blue-eyed soul
- Length: 3:54
- Label: Philles
- Songwriters: Gerry Goffin, Carole King, Phil Spector

The Righteous Brothers singles chronology
"Bring Your Love to Me" (1965)	"Just Once in My Life" (1965)	"You Can Have Her" (1965)

"Just Once in My Life" is a song written by Gerry Goffin, Carole King and Phil Spector. The song was released by the Righteous Brothers in 1965 and reached No. 9 on the Billboard Hot 100.

== The Righteous Brothers' original ==
After the success of the Righteous Brothers' first single with Phil Spector, "You've Lost That Lovin' Feelin'", the writers of the song Barry Mann and Cynthia Weil then wrote "(You're My) Soul and Inspiration" for them. The song however was not completed, and Spector instead asked Carole King to write a song for the duo, which turned out to be "Just Once in My Life".

The Righteous Brothers released their version as a single in April 1965 as the follow-up to "You've Lost That Lovin' Feelin'". Their second release on the Philles label, the single was another big hit, making the top ten of the Billboard Hot 100, reaching number nine.

Billboard described the song as "exciting, dramatic, emotion filled production performances by the "Lovin' Feeling" boys" which "can't miss."

=== Charts ===
Chart (1965)	Peak position
Canada Top Singles (RPM)	6
US Billboard Hot 100	9

== The Beach Boys version ==
The song was covered by the American rock band the Beach Boys and released on their 1976 album 15 Big Ones.

"Just Once in My Life"

Song by the Beach Boys

from the album 15 Big Ones
- Released: July 5, 1976
- Length: 3:47
- Songwriters: Gerry Goffin, Carole King, Phil Spector
- Producer: Brian Wilson

=== Personnel ===
Personnel per 2000 liner notes.

The Beach Boys

- Carl Wilson – lead vocal, percussion
- Brian Wilson – lead and backing vocals, piano, organ, Moog synthesizer, ARP String Ensemble
- Al Jardine – backing vocals
- Mike Love – backing vocals
- Dennis Wilson – drums

Additional musicians

- Ed Carter – guitar
- Ricky Fataar – percussion
- Billy Hinsche – guitar
- Bruce Johnston – backing vocals

== Other recordings ==
There are also versions by the Alan Price Set and The Action.
