= He's a Rebel =

1962 single recorded by the Blossoms, but attributed to the Crystals

Single by the Crystals

from the album He's a Rebel
- B-side: "I Love You Eddie"
- Released: August 1962
- Recorded: July 12, 1962
- Studio: Gold Star (Hollywood)
- Genre: Pop
- Length: 2:31
- Label: Philles
- Songwriter: Gene Pitney
- Producer: Phil Spector

The Crystals singles chronology
"He Hit Me (And It Felt Like a Kiss)" (1962)	"He's a Rebel" (1962)	"He's Sure the Boy I Love" (1962)

"He's a Rebel" is a song written by Gene Pitney and originally recorded in 1962 by two artists, first by singer Vikki Carr, followed by the more popular version credited to girl group the Crystals. The latter was produced by Phil Spector immediately after learning of the imminent release of Carr's version. He enlisted the Blossoms, with Darlene Love on lead and tenor Bobby Sheen added on harmony, and credited them as the Crystals, who were not consulted on his decision. Eight instrumentalists played on the recording, an unusually large number for a rock 'n' roll session at the time.

Spector's version was issued in August and topped the Billboard Hot 100 chart in November 1962, becoming his second number-one single after "To Know Him Is to Love Him" (1958). Once it had become a hit, the actual Crystals were obliged to sing it at their concerts. Carr's version, released in September, peaked at number 113 in the U.S. and number three in Australia.

"He's a Rebel" marked the direct precursor to Spector's Wall of Sound production style, which he developed on subsequent recordings with the personnel he had assembled for the song, including arranger Jack Nitzsche, engineer Larry Levine, and musicians associated with the Wrecking Crew. In 2004, "He's a Rebel" was inducted into the Grammy Hall of Fame. It has ranked number 263 on Rolling Stone's list of the all-time greatest songs and number 31 on Billboard's list of the all-time greatest girl group songs.

== Background ==
"He's a Rebel" was written by Gene Pitney with the Shirelles in mind, but they declined. The lyrics describe a girl in love with a young man who spurns society's conventions. Despite his being misunderstood by others, the singer claims he is sweet and faithful and vows to be the same towards him.

While visiting Aaron Schroeder's music publishing firm in New York, Phil Spector heard the song and immediately acquired exclusive rights to Pitney's demo, opting for a pared-down rock arrangement over Pitney’s initial vision of a string-backed recording. He had learned Vikki Carr was to record it for Liberty Records as her debut, and wanted his own version on sale first.

== Recording ==
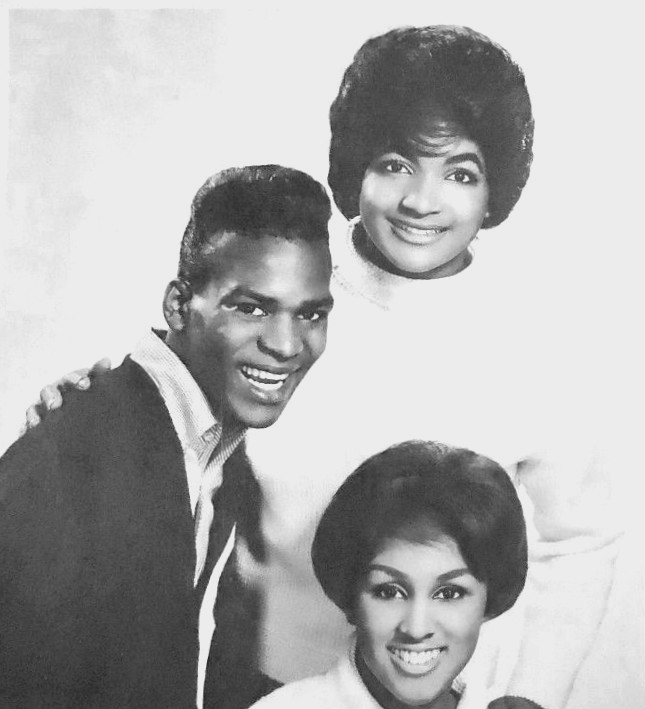
Although credited as "the Crystals", Darlene Love, Fanita James, and Bobby Sheen were among the actual singers on "He's a Rebel"

Spector produced "He's a Rebel" at Gold Star Studios in Hollywood on July 12, 1962. He enlisted the Blossoms, a Los Angeles group, to record the track with the agreement that the record would still be credited to the Crystals. The instrumentalists comprised eight players, double the number typically used on a rock 'n' roll session. Al DeLory introduced the song’s central five-note piano motif, derived from gospel, while Steve Douglas performed a mid-section saxophone solo. In the control booth, Spector monitored playback at an overwhelming volume later described by Douglas as "a roar" that puzzled all present: "We all knew we were listening to something different."

Compared to Spector's earlier sessions, the greater number of musicians necessitated more time dedicated to balancing mixing levels. He rehearsed the arrangement developed by Jack Nitzsche by instructing the musicians to repeat the opening four bars continuously, a process that challenged the guitarists (Howard Roberts and Tommy Tedesco) especially. Engineer Larry Levine remembered that they "played for hours on end", while drummer Hal Blaine later stated, "Howard's fingers were bleeding. He said, 'I can’t take it anymore.'" Roberts, a jazz guitar virtuoso, later reflected on the track's musical simplicity, "If there is ever a decline in Western civilization, that period of music will be high on the list of causes. After coming out of a period of Jerome Kern ...".

One of the session observers, Dan Kessel, the son of guitarist Barney Kessel, suggested placing microphones in the bathroom to capture the echo there. He recalled, "I told Phil I saw Mitch Miller do similar things at Columbia. He looked at me funny but then he had us go over there and perform handclaps."

== Release ==
"He's a Rebel" was released in late August 1962, with the B-side "I Love You Eddie." On November 3, "He's a Rebel" topped the Billboard Hot 100 chart. The number two song was Pitney's "Only Love Can Break a Heart", giving him the two top-selling singles in the U.S (as a songwriter or performer). In the UK Singles Chart, "He's a Rebel" peaked at number 19.

Crystals singer Mary Thomas recalled that "our mouths fell open" when she and her groupmates heard a disc jockey announce "the new Crystals song." (Note: According to author David Howard, Spector had intended to feature the Crystals but proceeded without the original group after they declined to accompany him to Los Angeles to record the song due to fear of flying.) The quintet was then obliged to add "He's a Rebel" to their live repertoire, even though lead singer Barbara Alston could not mimic Blossoms lead singer Darlene Love. For that reason, 15-year-old Dolores "LaLa" Brooks became the lead singer the following year with the follow-up "Then He Kissed Me".

Impressed with the results achieved by recording at Gold Star, Spector developed his recording methods further with his 1962 production of "Zip-A-Dee-Doo-Dah", which marked what Larry Levine considered the first true example of the Wall of Sound. Levine reflected, "He hated to fly, so he would have done anything to avoid flying, but he told me 'I heard the sound of the studio when we did 'He's A Rebel', and I knew it would enable me to do what I want to do.'"

== Legacy ==
Actress Tracey Ullman performed the song in an episode of her show, The Tracey Ullman Show, in the sketch "Gold Diggers of 1988".

In 2004, "He's a Rebel" was inducted into the Grammy Hall of Fame. It was also ranked number 263 on Rolling Stone's 500 Greatest Songs of All Time. and number 31 on Billboard's list of 100 Greatest Girl Group Songs of All Time.

Writing in his 2003 biography Wall of Pain, author Dave Thompson reported that the song was regarded by many as the ultimate Phil Spector record" and the zenith of "the entire Brill Building/girl group epoch that modern writers and historians now wax so rhapsodic over."

The song was featured in the 2018 movie Bad Times at the El Royale, in which the character of Darleen Sweet records "He's a Rebel" under the Spector-inspired record producer character Buddy Sunday.

== Personnel ==
- Lead vocals – Darlene Love, Edna Wright (co-lead during chorus)
- Backing vocals – The Blossoms (Edna Wright, Fanita James, Gracia Nitzsche, Gloria Jones) with Bobby Sheen
- Hal Blaine – drums
- Steve Douglas – saxophone
- Howard Roberts – guitar
- Tommy Tedesco – guitar
- Al DeLory – piano
- Don Randi – piano
- Jimmy Bond – upright bass
- Ray Pohlman – bass guitar
- The July 1962 session was arranged by Jack Nitzsche and engineered by Larry Levine.

== Chart history ==
=== Weekly charts ===
Chart (1962–63)	Peak position
Canada (CHUM Hit Parade)	1
New Zealand (Listener)	1
UK Singles (OCC)	19
U.S. Billboard Hot 100	1
U.S. Cash Box Top 100	2

=== Year-end charts ===
Chart (1962)	Rank
U.S. (Joel Whitburn's Pop Annual)	12
U.S. Cash Box	72
