= Wait 'til My Bobby Gets Home =

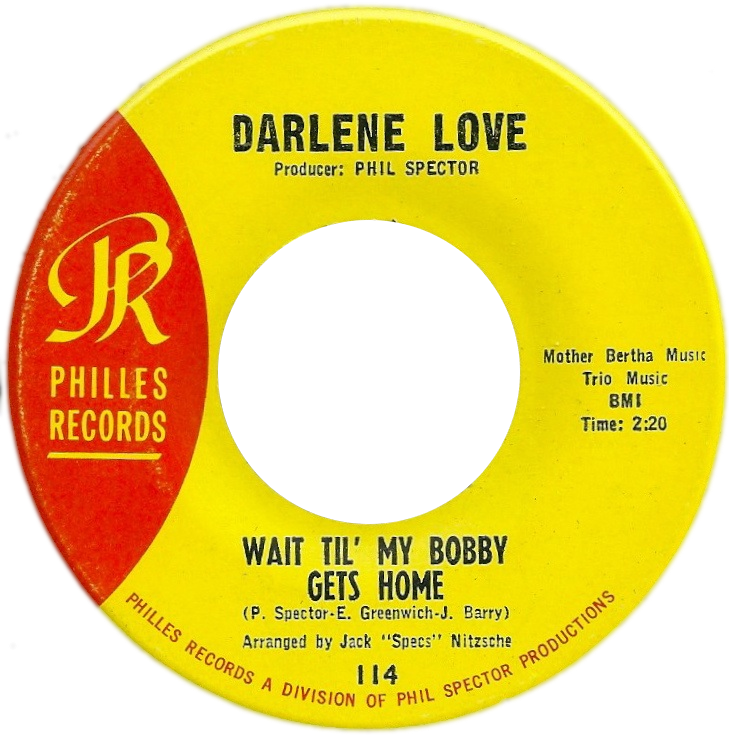
- One of A-side labels of the U.S. vinyl release

Single by Darlene Love
- B-side: "Take It From Me"
- Released: June 13, 1963
- Recorded: 1963
- Genre: R&B
- Length: 2:20
- Label: Philles
- Songwriter(s): Phil Spector, Ellie Greenwich, Jeff Barry
- Producer(s): Phil Spector

Darlene Love singles chronology
| "Not Too Young to Get Married" (1963) | "Wait 'til My Bobby Gets Home" (1963) | "A Fine, Fine Boy" (1963) |

"Wait 'til My Bobby Gets Home" is a song written by Phil Spector, Ellie Greenwich and Jeff Barry. It was recorded at Gold Star Studios in Los Angeles in May 1963 by Darlene Love with the lead vocals shared by Love and her sister Edna Wright. The song was arranged by Jack Nitzsche, Larry Levine was the engineer and Spector's Wall of Sound was played by The Wrecking Crew.

The record was released later in 1963 as Philles Records #114 and peaked at #26 in the Billboard Top 100.

The song was covered by Motown's Martha and the Vandellas for their 1963 album Heat Wave, as well as by British singer Beverley Jones that same year. Ellie Greenwich recorded her own version in 1973.
