= Christmas (Baby Please Come Home) =

"Christmas (Baby, Please Come Home)"

Single by Darlene Love

from the album A Christmas Gift for You from Philles Records
- B-side: "Harry And Milt Meet Hal B."
- Released: December 1963
- Studio: Gold Star
- Genre: Christmas; R&B; pop
- Length: 2:49
- Label: Philles
- Songwriters: Jeff Barry; Ellie Greenwich; Phil Spector
- Producer: Phil Spector

"Christmas (Baby, Please Come Home)" is a pop song originally sung by Darlene Love and included on the 1963 compilation album A Christmas Gift for You from Philles Records (later renamed A Christmas Gift for You from Phil Spector). The song was written by Ellie Greenwich, Jeff Barry, and Phil Spector.

Upon release, the song did not find commercial success, but in later years it has gone on to become a Christmas standard. It charted for the first time on the Billboard Hot 100 in December 2018 and has since peaked at number 14. It has also been listed on the Billboard Holiday 100 chart, peaking at number seven. The song has been covered by U2, Mariah Carey, Cher, Hanson, Death Cab for Cutie, and Michael Bublé, among others.

== Background and release ==
Love was given a demo of the song over the phone and went on to record the song. The song was released as a single in 1963 and in 1964 (Philles X-125). Upon release, the song was not a huge success but it has gone on to become a Christmas standard.

In 1963, Spector decided that the song was strong enough to warrant a non-seasonal version and wrote a version titled "Johnny (Baby Please Come Home)", which Love also performed. This version was released to the public in 1976 as the final track on the Spector compilation album, Rare Masters Vol. 2.

Cher performed background vocals on the 1963 version, which six decades later came full circle when Love duetted on Cher's 2023 version of the song.

== Chart performance ==
Despite not charting on its first release, the song has found commercial success in later years. The song charted on the Billboard Holiday 100 chart at number 99 on the week ending December 13, 2014, reaching a peak position of number 7 seven years later (on the week ending December 4, 2021). On the week ending December 29, 2018, the track entered the main Billboard Hot 100 chart for the first time at number 50, and attained an all-time peak position of number 14 on the week ending January 3, 2026 (following its fourth chart re-entry). On the official UK Singles Chart, "Christmas (Baby Please Come Home)" made its first appearance on the week of January 5, 2017 at number 74. The song re-entered the same chart one year later at number 77, and again on the week of December 20, 2018 at number 80, eventually reaching its all-time peak position of number 22 two weeks later. It has re-entered the UK Singles Chart each December since.

== Live performances ==
Darlene Love performed the song on Late Night with David Letterman (NBC) in 1986. She then sang it annually for 20 years (1994–2014) on the episode before Christmas on Late Show with David Letterman (CBS), 21 times in all. The exception was in 2007 when Love was unable to perform due to the Writers' Strike and a repeat of her 2006 performance was shown instead. She performed the song with Paul Shaffer and the show's house band (The World's Most Dangerous Band at NBC, the CBS Orchestra at CBS). She gave a surprise performance of the song with Shaffer in a video uploaded to Letterman's YouTube channel in December 2023.

Love also performed the song on December 24, 2013, in front of traders at the New York Stock Exchange as the market closed for the day.

Beginning in 2015, the tradition of Love's annual performance of the song moved to The View (ABC, 2015–2023), where it has continued during its last edition before Christmas until 2023. only skipping out the 2021 edition due to being exposed to a positive COVID-19 case resulting in a quarantine; a compilation of her previous performances was shown instead.

In 2024, after a prolonged negotiation, Love brought the annual tradition to The Tonight Show Starring Jimmy Fallon; she performed the song on the December 18 episode, backed by Paul Shaffer, Little Steven and the Disciples of Soul.

== Legacy ==
In December 2010, Rolling Stone magazine ranked "Christmas (Baby Please Come Home)" first on its list of The Greatest Rock and Roll Christmas Songs, noting that "nobody can match Love's emotion and sheer vocal power." The song has also been used in several movies as well as being featured as an intro song for Westwood One's broadcasts of NFL Christmas Day games.

== Other versions ==
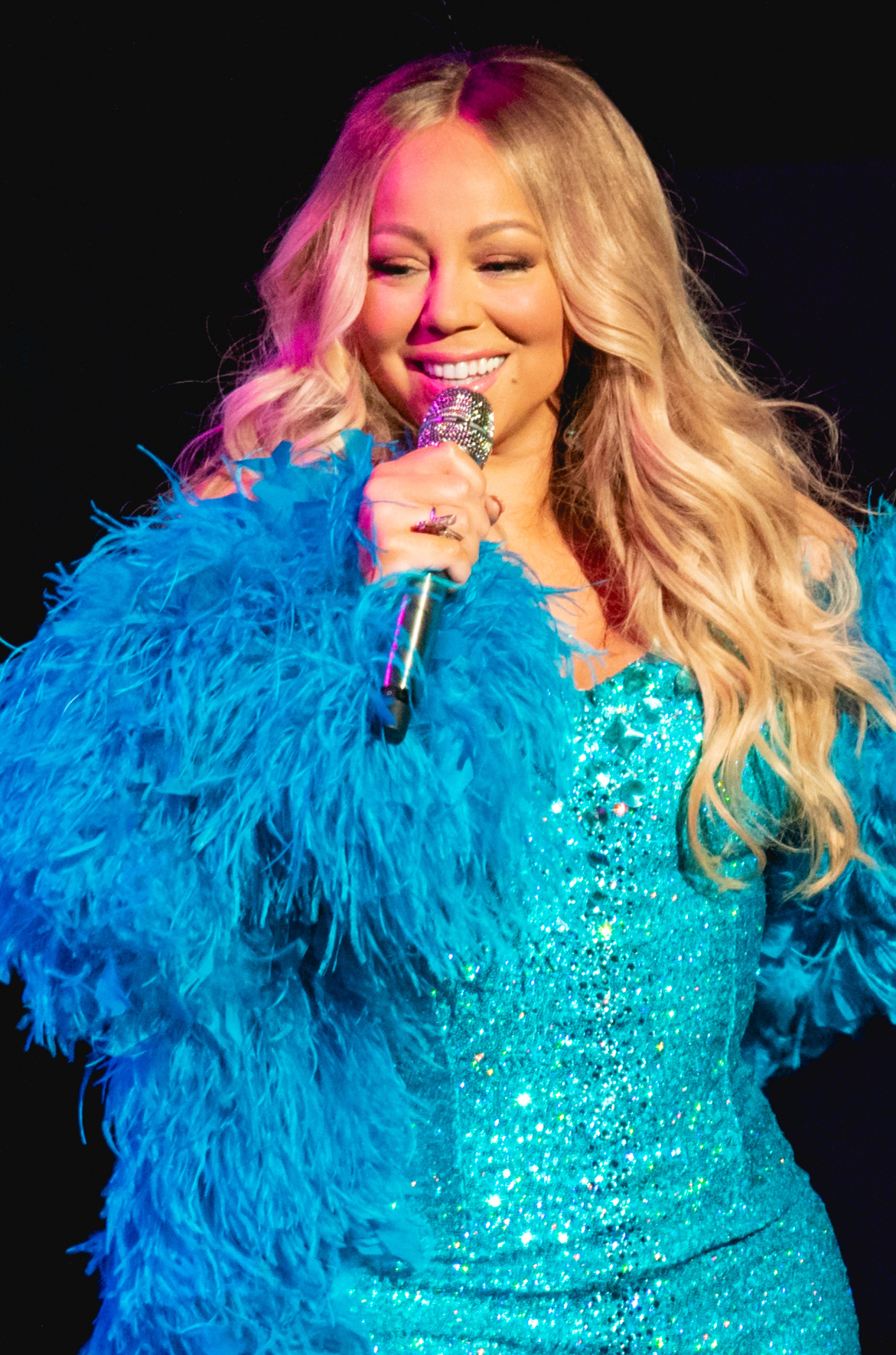
American singer Mariah Carey recorded the song in 1994. Love has praised Carey's version.

The song has become a Christmas standard and has since been recorded multiple times by prominent artists. Love has noted that her two favourite covers of the song are Mariah Carey and U2's for their originality and vocal harmonies respectively.

- The song was recorded by rock band U2 in 1987 during a sound check in Glasgow, Scotland during their Joshua Tree Tour. It was released on the compilation A Very Special Christmas the same year and on the album Unreleased & Rare in the digital box set The Complete U2 in 2004; Love performed backing vocals in this recording.
- In 1994, Mariah Carey recorded a version for her album Merry Christmas. Carey's version reached number 59 on Billboard's Hot Digital Songs chart in 2011 and number 20 on the US Holiday 100; the latter being the second highest position for the song on the chart after the original. She first performed her version in 2008 at The Grammy Nominations Concert Live. The song was added to the setlist for her concert residency All I Want for Christmas Is You: A Night of Joy and Festivity (2014–2019). In 2021, Carey covered the song again for her Christmas special Mariah's Christmas: The Magic Continues and has included it on her Christmas tours: Merry Christmas to All! Tour and Merry Christmas One and All!.
- In 1997 Hanson released this song on their Snowed In album.
- In 2010, Josh Ramsay from the Canadian band Marianas Trench covered the song for 604 Records' Christmas compilation album.
- In 2011, Michael Bublé covered the song for his album Christmas. In 2021, he performed the song live with Hannah Waddingham on his Christmas in the City NBC special celebrating the 10th anniversary of his Christmas album.
- In 2021, Keke Palmer and the cast of Sing 2 covered the song for a Christmas commercial from Comcast's Xfinity and Sky Group and as a bonus track from the original motion picture soundtrack of the same name. Palmer and Tori Kelly performed the song live on The Voice season 21 finale with the top 13 acts.
- In 2022, American country singer Caylee Hammack released a single.
- In 2023, Cher recorded a duet version with Love for her album Christmas, after originally singing backing vocals for Love's version in 1963. Italian singer Annalisa released a cover version of the song that same year, which featured in the Prime Video's Christmas comedy Elf Me; the song peaked at number 10 on the Italian singles chart.
- In November 2024, country singer Mason Ramsey covered the song on his Christmas EP, Merry Christmas, Baby.
- The song has also been covered by Foo Fighters, Jon Bon Jovi, Pentatonix, Joey Ramone, and Alexia.

== Personnel ==
- Lead vocals by Darlene Love
- Backing vocals by: Cher and The Blossoms (Fanita James, Darlene Love, Gracia Nitzsche, Edna Wright, and Carolyn Willis)
- Instrumentation by The Wrecking Crew:
  - Jack Nitzsche – arrangements, percussion
  - Steve Douglas – saxophone
  - Jay Migliori – saxophone
  - Hal Blaine – drums
  - Louis Blackburn – horns
  - Leon Russell – piano
  - Roy Caton – trumpet
  - Sonny Bono – percussion
  - Frank Capp – percussion
  - Ray Pohlman – bass
  - Irv Rubins – guitar
  - Barney Kessel – guitar
  - Bill Pitman – guitar
  - Tommy Tedesco – guitar
  - Nino Tempo – guitar
  - Johnny Vidor – strings
  - Larry Levine – engineer

== Charts ==
=== Darlene Love version ===
==== Weekly charts ====
Weekly chart performance for "Christmas (Baby Please Come Home)" by Darlene Love
Chart (1963–2026)	Peak position
Australia (ARIA)	26
Austria (Ö3 Austria Top 40)	53
Canada Hot 100 (Billboard)	13
Croatia International Airplay (Top lista)	53
Finland (Suomen virallinen lista)	50
France (SNEP)	192
Germany (GfK)	78
Global 200 (Billboard)	16
Greece International (IFPI)	17
Hungary (Single Top 40)	36
Hungary (Stream Top 40)	19
Ireland (IRMA)	21
Italy (FIMI)	34
Latvia Streaming (LaIPA)	17
Lithuania (AGATA)	18
Luxembourg (Billboard)	24
Netherlands (Single Top 100)	25
New Zealand (Recorded Music NZ)	22
Norway (IFPI Norge)	72
Poland (Polish Streaming Top 100)	61
Portugal (AFP)	31
Slovakia Singles Digital (ČNS IFPI)	62
Sweden (Sverigetopplistan)	59
Switzerland (Schweizer Hitparade)	27
UK Singles (Official Charts)	20
US Billboard Hot 100	14
US Holiday 100 (Billboard)	7

==== Monthly charts ====
Monthly chart performance
Chart (2025)	Peak position
Estonia Airplay (TopHit)	73

==== All-time charts ====
All-time chart performance for "Christmas (Baby Please Come Home)" by Darlene Love
Chart	Position
US Holiday 100 (Billboard)	44

=== Mariah Carey version ===
==== Weekly charts ====
Weekly chart performance for "Christmas (Baby Please Come Home)" by Mariah Carey
Chart (1994–2025)	Peak position
Australia (ARIA)	73
Canada Hot 100 (Billboard)	46
Croatia International Airplay (Top lista)	30
Czech Republic Singles Digital (ČNS IFPI)	50
Estonia Airplay (TopHit)	68
France (SNEP)	62
Global 200 (Billboard)	78
Greece (IFPI)	50
Hungary (Stream Top 40)	24
Ireland (IRMA)	71
Latvia Streaming (LAIPA)	28
Lithuania (AGATA)	39
Netherlands (Single Top 100)	21
Poland (Polish Airplay Top 100)	54
Poland (Polish Streaming Top 100)	76
Portugal (AFP)	61
Slovakia Singles Digital (ČNS IFPI)	40
South Korea International (Circle)	83
Sweden Heatseeker (Sverigetopplistan)	2
Switzerland (Schweizer Hitparade)	50
UK Singles (Official Charts)	58
UK Hip Hop/R&B (Official Charts)	5
US Holiday 100 (Billboard)	20
US R&B/Hip-Hop Digital Songs (Billboard)	5
US R&B/Hip-Hop Streaming Songs (Billboard)	23

==== All-time charts ====
All-time chart performance for "Christmas (Baby Please Come Home)" by Mariah Carey
Chart	Position
US Holiday 100 (Billboard)	45

=== Michael Bublé version ===
==== Weekly charts ====
Weekly chart performance for "Christmas (Baby Please Come Home)" by Michael Bublé
Chart (2011–2026)	Peak position
Australia (ARIA)	87
Austria (Ö3 Austria Top 40)	57
Estonia Airplay (TopHit)	96
Germany (GfK)	43
Global 200 (Billboard)	76
Hungary (Rádiós Top 40)	39
Ireland (IRMA)	93
Italy (FIMI)	57
Netherlands (Single Top 100)	58
Norway (IFPI Norge)	80
Poland Airplay (ZPAV)	60
Portugal (AFP)	126
Sweden (Sverigetopplistan)	31
UK Singles (Official Charts)	47
US Holiday 100 (Billboard)	24
US Rolling Stone Top 100	100

==== All-time charts ====
All-time chart performance for "Christmas (Baby Please Come Home)" by Michael Bublé
Chart	Position
US Holiday 100 (Billboard)	66

=== Leona Lewis version ===
Weekly chart performance for "Christmas (Baby Please Come Home)" by Leona Lewis
Chart (2013)	Peak position
South Korea International (Circle)	49

=== Annalisa version ===
Weekly chart performance for "Christmas (Baby Please Come Home)" by Annalisa
Chart (2023)	Peak position
Italy (FIMI)	10

=== Various artists version ===
Weekly chart performance for "Christmas (Baby Please Come Home)" by various artists
Chart (2019–2020)	Peak position
US Rolling Stone Top 100	9

=== Josh Ramsay version ===
Weekly chart performance for "Christmas (Baby Please Come Home)" by Josh Ramsay
Chart (2011)	Peak position
Canada AC (Billboard)	34

== Certifications ==
=== Darlene Love version ===
Certifications for "Christmas (Baby Please Come Home)" by Darlene Love
Region	Certification	Certified units/sales
Denmark (IFPI Danmark)	Gold	45,000^{‡}
New Zealand (RMNZ)	Gold	15,000^{‡}
Portugal (AFP)	Gold	12,000^{‡}
United Kingdom (BPI) Digital sales since 2011	2× Platinum	1,200,000^{‡}
United States (RIAA)	3× Platinum	3,000,000^{‡}
Streaming
Greece (IFPI Greece)	Gold	1,000,000^{†}
^{‡} Sales+streaming figures based on certification alone.^{†} Streaming-only figures based on certification alone.

=== Mariah Carey version ===
Certifications for "Christmas (Baby Please Come Home)" by Mariah Carey
Region	Certification	Certified units/sales
Australia (ARIA)	Gold	35,000^{‡}
Canada (Music Canada)	2× Platinum	160,000^{‡}
New Zealand (RMNZ)	Gold	15,000^{‡}
Portugal (AFP)	Gold	12,000^{‡}
United Kingdom (BPI)	Gold	400,000^{‡}
United States (RIAA)	Platinum	1,000,000^{‡}
^{‡} Sales+streaming figures based on certification alone.

=== Michael Bublé version ===
Certifications for "Christmas (Baby Please Come Home)" by Michael Bublé
Region	Certification	Certified units/sales
Italy (FIMI)	Gold	35,000^{‡}
United Kingdom (BPI)	Platinum	600,000^{‡}
^{‡} Sales+streaming figures based on certification alone.
