= Jean King (singer) =

American singer (1938–1983)

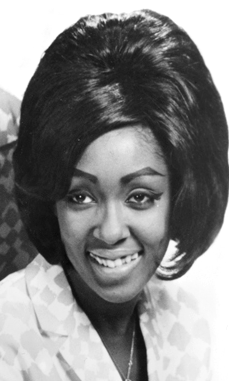
- King as part of The Blossoms in 1966

Background information
- Born: Jean Louise King; October 12, 1938; Chicago, Illinois, U.S.
- Died: March 28, 1983 (aged 44) Las Vegas, Nevada, U.S.
- Occupation: Singer
- Years active: 1962–1983
- Formerly of: The Blossoms
- Spouses: Foster Charles Johnson (m. 1961, divorced) James Roy Richardson (m. 1967; div. 1976) Richard Waters (m. 1977; div. 1980) Larry Richstein (m. 1980)
- Children: 3

Jean Louise King (October 12, 1938 – March 28, 1983) was an American singer who was a member of the girl group the Blossoms from 1964 until her death.

== Biography ==
Born in Chicago, Illinois, King was raised in Washington Terrace, Utah. She was a Roman Catholic. She sung in the choir and attended Weber High School. She was importantly influenced by glee clubs, talent shows, and formal opera studies. In 1956, she majored in music at University of Southern California, after receiving a scholarship, and landed a role in the movie Porgy & Bess in 1959. In May 1963, King performed in Ray Charles' backing group the Raelettes during his shows in Paris, and had her own solo act in the shows during that same period, accomped by Charles' orchestra. In July that same year, she backed Del Shannon on his song "Red Rubber Ball" in the vocal chorus.

The following year, she joined the Blossoms through a connection with H. B. Barnum, replacing Gracia Nitzsche. She replaced Nitzsche, who was white, after the group received a call by Shindig! to appear on the show after Nitzsche left because Shindig did not want a mixed group on the show. However, they continued to perform on the show from 1964 until 1966. During her tenure in the group, she had a stint as a solo artist, recording for Hanna-Barbera subsidiary Hanna-Barbera Records, and King released her debut and only studio album, "Sings for the In-Crowd" in May 1966. Throughout her tenure with the Blossoms, she sung backup for Elvis Presley, Tom Jones, Nancy Sinatra, and Bill Medley. By 1974, after Love left following a backstage incident that caused the Blossoms to be fired as background singers by Dionne Warwick, and King's collapse after taking drugs, King and James continued the Blossoms, performing in Las Vegas as background singers with Alex Brown, Stephanie Spruill, and Cynthia Woodward as replacements for Love. They released a single, "A.P.B." in 1977, on MAM Records.

In her later years, she married soundman Larry Richstein (1945–2012) and moved to Washington. On March 28, 1983, King suffered a heart attack and died in Las Vegas at the age of 44 from heart surgery complications.

== Discography ==
Albums

- Sings for the In-Crowd (1966, Hanna-Barbera Records)

Singles

- Something Happens to Me (1965, Hanna-Barbera Records)
- The Nicest Things Happen (1965, Hanna-Barbera Records)
- Don't Say Goodbye (1966, Hanna-Barbera Records)
- Watermelon Man (1966, Hanna-Barbera Records)
