= The Alley Cats (1960s group) =

California musical group

- Genres: doo-wop
- Years active: 1962 - 1965
- Label: Philles

The Alley Cats were a musical group active in 1960s. One of their releases saw moderate airplay and chart action.

Brice Coefield and Sheridan Spencer belonged to a group named "The Untouchables" who had released unsuccessful singles for the Madison and Liberty labels. At the end of 1962, these two joined with James Barker and Gary Pipkin, who had been with The Robins, and lead singer Bobby Sheen, who was coming off success with Bob B. Soxx & the Blue Jeans, to form The Alley Cats, the brainchild of Lou Adler. The group was based out of Los Angeles. Lou Adler brought this combination to Philles Records, although Adler was soon to feel antagonism from Phil Spector because of this group.

Their first record was their most popular: "Puddin N' Tain", a song based upon a children's playground chant, entered the charts January 1963 and achieved a chart position of 43 in the United States when released on Philles Records 45 rpm #108. The group released no follow-up record for Philles, but in 1965 they released a single for Epic Records.

Later, Brice Coefield, Gary Pipkin, and Sheridan Spencer re-connected with Lou Adler and formed the group Africa, releasing records on Adler's Ode Records.
