= Uptown (The Crystals song) =

Single by the Crystals

from the album Twist Uptown
- B-side: "What a Nice Way to Turn Seventeen"
- Released: 1962
- Genre: Pop
- Label: Philles
- Songwriters: Barry Mann, Cynthia Weil
- Producer: Phil Spector

The Crystals singles chronology
"There's No Other (Like My Baby)" (1961)	"Uptown" (1962)	"He Hit Me (and It Felt like a Kiss)" (1962)

"Uptown" is a 1962 single by the Crystals. On the Cash Box Top 100, the song peaked at #10. On the Billboard charts, "Uptown" reached #13 on the Billboard Hot 100 and #18 on the Billboard R&B Sides chart.

== Background ==
In 1961, the Crystals recorded "There's No Other (Like My Baby)" with producer Phil Spector. When the Crystals went to record "Uptown" the following year, the group had not received payment from Spector for "There's No Other". After recording "Uptown", the Crystals were not paid by Spector, which led the group to fire their manager Benny Wells and hire the new manager, Daniel Turner.

== Recording ==
Before the Crystals recorded "Uptown", La La Brooks replaced Myrna Girrard after Girrard became pregnant. During a retake of "Uptown", Spector brought in Eva Boyd after songwriters Cynthia Weil and Barry Mann convinced him to redo the vocals. Boyd got angry with Spector after having to re-record her vocals for "Uptown" multiple times, which led to Spector to release the original version with the Crystals.

== Composition ==
"Uptown" was originally written for Tony Orlando, but Spector convinced songwriters Cynthia Weil and Barry Mann to give him the song. After acquisition, Spector changed some of the notes to ones that Barbara Alston of the Crystals could sing and modified the lyrics to be about an African American instead of a Latin American, though it still retained a Latin music style. The lyrics in "Uptown" about living in the slums created a "sophisticated and socially conscious" song that laid the framework for later rock and roll songs.

== Reception ==
Billboard magazine said that with the flip side "What a Nice Way to Turn Seventeen", both songs had "appeal for both pop and r&b buyers".

== Chart performance ==
In 1962, "Uptown" peaked at number 13 on the Billboard Hot 100 and #18 on the Hot R&B Sides.

=== Weekly charts ===
Chart (1962)	Peak position
Canada (CHUM Hit Parade)	3
U.S. Billboard Hot 100	13
U.S. Billboard R&B Sides	18
U.S. Cash Box Top 100	10

=== Year-end charts ===
Chart (1962)	Rank
U.S. Billboard Hot 100	72
U.S. Cash Box	88

== Cover versions ==
"Uptown" was covered by Anita Lindblom for Fontana and Peter Gordeno for His Master's Voice.

== Sources ==
- Emerson, Ken (2005). Always Magic in the Air. Viking. p. 136. ISBN 0670034568.
- Musso, Anthony P. (2007). Setting the Record Straight. AuthorHouse. p. 150. ISBN 9781425959869.
