= The Crystals =

American vocal group

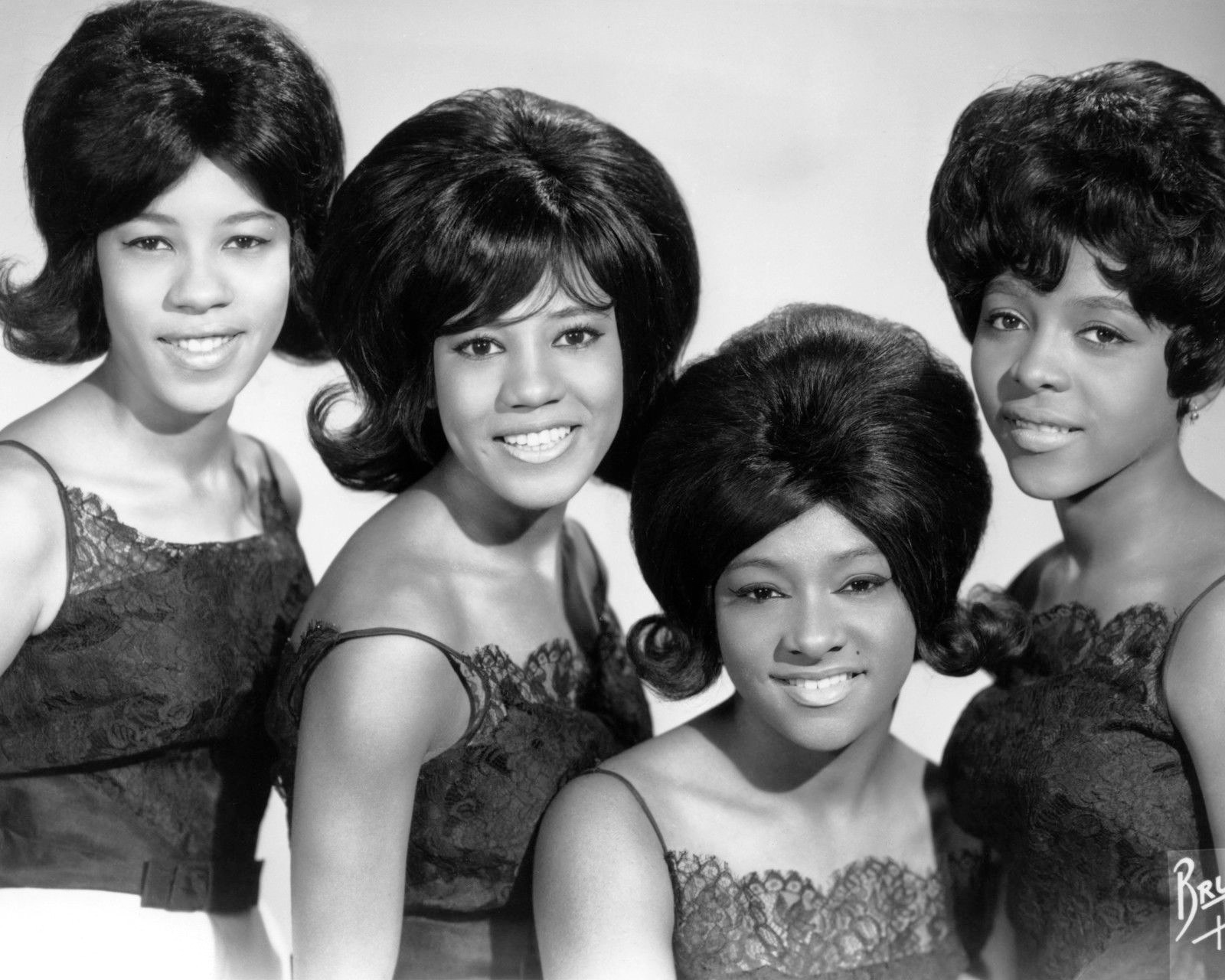
- The Crystals in 1963. Left to right: Patricia Wright, Dolores Kenniebrew, Dolores Brooks, and Barbara Alston.

Background information
- Origin: New York City, U.S.
- Genres: R&B; pop; rock and roll
- Years active: 1960–1967; 1970–present
- Label: Philles
- Members: Dolores "Dee Dee" Kenniebrew; Patricia Pritchett-Lewis; Melissa "MelSoulTree" Grant
- Past members: Barbara Alston; Mary Thomas; Myrna Giraud; Patricia "Patsy" Wright; Dolores "LaLa" Brooks; Frances Collins

The Crystals are an American vocal group that originated in New York City. Considered one of the defining acts of the girl group era in the first half of the 1960s, their 1961–1964 chart hits – including "There's No Other (Like My Baby)", "Uptown", "He's Sure the Boy I Love", "He's a Rebel", "Da Doo Ron Ron" and "Then He Kissed Me"– featured three different female lead singers and were all produced by Phil Spector. The latter three songs were originally ranked number 263, number 114, and number 493, respectively, on Rolling Stone magazine's list of The 500 Greatest Songs of All Time. However, two songs were omitted from the magazine's 2010 update, leaving only "He's a Rebel" at number 267. In the 2021 update, "Da Doo Ron Ron" was added back to the list at number 366.

== History ==
=== Formation and signing to Philles ===
In 1961, Barbara Alston (December 29, 1943, Baltimore, Maryland – February 16, 2018, Charlotte, North Carolina), Mary Thomas, Dolores "Dee Dee" Kenniebrew (born 1945), Myrna Giraud and Myra Patricia "Patsy" Wright (Burch) formed the Crystals with the help of Benny Wells, Alston's uncle. Soon, the quintet signed with Phil Spector's label Philles Records.

Their first hit, the gospel-influenced "There's No Other (Like My Baby)", debuted on the Billboard Hot 100 in November 1961. Originally the B-side to "Oh Yeah, Maybe Baby" (featuring Wright on lead), the stirring pop ballad was co-written by Spector and Leroy Bates and featured Barbara Alston on vocals. The recording was made late on the evening of the high school prom at the William H. Maxwell Career and Technical High School, the school attended by Alston, Thomas, and Giraud; they were still wearing their prom dresses, as they had come to the studio straight from the event. The single reached number 20 in January 1962, marking an auspicious debut for Spector's Philles label.

Brill Building songwriters Barry Mann and Cynthia Weil's "Uptown" gave the girls their second radio hit. Having an ethnic flavor with flamenco guitar and castanets, the more uptempo "Uptown" featured Alston once again emoting convincingly over a boy, though this time with class issues woven into the story. After the success of "Uptown", a pregnant Giraud was replaced by Dolores "LaLa" Brooks.

The controversial subject matter of the next single, 1962's "He Hit Me (And It Felt Like a Kiss)" (written by Carole King and Gerry Goffin and sung by Alston), resulted in limited airplay with the track only "bubbling under" the Billboard Hot 100, peaking at number 123. Alston later disowned the track, stating it was "absolutely, positively, the one record that none of us liked".

=== "Replacement" Crystals ===
Soon after "He Hit Me" flopped, Phil Spector began recording singer Darlene Love and her group the Blossoms. The Crystals were not able to travel from New York to Los Angeles fast enough to suit the LA-based Spector, who wanted to quickly record writer Gene Pitney's "He's a Rebel" before Vikki Carr could release her version on Liberty Records. As Love and the Blossoms were also based in Los Angeles, Spector recorded and released their version under the Crystals' banner. It was not the first time Spector promised the Blossoms a single and released it under the Crystals name.

The song had originally been offered to the Shirelles, who turned it down because of the anti-establishment lyrics. It marked a shift in girl group thematic material, where the singer loves a "bad boy", a theme that would be amplified by later groups (especially the Shangri-Las' "Leader of the Pack").

The ghost release of this single came as a total surprise to the Crystals who were an experienced and much traveled girl harmony group in their own right, but they were nevertheless required to perform and promote the new single on television and on tour as if it were their own. The single reached number one on the Billboard Hot 100 in November 1962.

"He's a Rebel" was the Crystals' only US number-one hit and also made the UK top 20. "He's a Rebel" kept Pitney's own "Only Love Can Break a Heart" off the top spot on 3 November 1962. Pitney never reached the Hot 100's summit. The Crystals follow-up single, "He's Sure the Boy I Love", was also recorded by Love and the Blossoms. It reached number 11 on the Billboard chart and featured a spoken intro by Love.

=== "Real" Crystals return ===
Though it is unclear as to the level of their participation in "(Let's Dance) The Screw", the 'real' Crystals definitely began recording again under their own name in 1963. However, Thomas had departed to get married, only to join another mildly successful group, the Butterflys, along with another original Crystal, Myrna Giraud. This reduced the group to a quartet. Alston, known for her shyness and stage fright, was never comfortable with being out front, stepped down from the lead spot giving it to Dolores "LaLa" Brooks. According to Brooks, she had been doing Alston's leads in their live shows for a while.

After "(Let's Dance) The Screw", the group's next release was "Da Doo Ron Ron". The song was a top 10 hit in both the US and the UK, as was the follow-up single "Then He Kissed Me", with lead vocals also sung by Brooks. Both these songs were actually recorded by Brooks, the Blossoms and other session singers (including a young Cher). Brooks also flew out to Los Angeles to record tracks for the seasonal album, A Christmas Gift for You from Philles Records. Covers of "The Twist", "The Wah-Watusi" (lead vocals by Nedra Talley), "Mashed Potato Time", and "Hot Pastrami" were credited to the Crystals on their 1963 Philles LP The Crystals Sing Their Greatest Hits, Volume 1 but were actually recorded by The Ronettes.

At the start of 1964, the Crystals flew to the UK for their first European live shows. "Then He Kissed Me" soared to number 2 in the UK, and the Crystals also headlined the TV programs Ready Steady Go!, and Tonight at the London Palladium.

=== Mounting tension and break-up ===
Despite the steady flow of hit singles, tensions between Spector and the Crystals mounted. Already unhappy with having been replaced by Love and the Blossoms on two singles recordings, the Crystals were even more upset when Spector began focusing much of his time on his other girl group the Ronettes. Not only did the Ronettes become Philles Records' priority act, the Ronettes actually replaced the Crystals on four album tracks on the 1963 compilation LP, The Crystals Sing the Greatest Hits. As well, there were disputes about royalties, with the Crystals feeling that Spector was withholding royalty money that was owed to them.

Two failed Crystals singles followed before the band left Spector's Philles Records for United Artists Records in 1964. "Little Boy", which reached number 92, was a Wall of Sound production that was layered multiple times, which meant that the vocals were hard to distinguish from the music. "All Grown Up", their final Philles single (of which two versions exist), only reached number 98.

1964 also saw the departure of Wright. She was replaced by Frances Collins (aka Fatima Johnson, mother of the rapper Prodigy), a dancer whom they had met while touring. Toward the end of that year Alston also departed and was not replaced, leaving the group a trio. As a trio, they recorded two singles for United Artists, "My Place"/"You Can't Tie a Good Girl Down" (September 1965) and "Are You Trying To Get Rid Of Me Baby"/"I Got A Man" (February 1966). One more single was released by Alston, Brooks and Thomas on the tiny Michelle Records in 1967, "Ring-A-Ting-A-Ling"/"Should I Keep On Waiting", and they disbanded later that year.

They reunited in 1971 and performed until at least 2018. Kenniebrew is the only Crystal who remained active throughout their touring from the 1970s to then, performing with Patricia Pritchett-Lewis, a member since 2005, and Melissa "MelSoulTree" Grant, a member since 2002. That trio of Crystals self-released a CD in 2010 entitled Live in Asia, recorded in Singapore.

After living in Europe for two decades, Brooks returned to the US in 2001 and, as of 2022, performs under her own name across the world, and as the Crystals in the UK and Canada, where she holds the trademark rights to the name.

Barbara Alston died at a hospital in Charlotte, North Carolina, on February 16, 2018, at age 74.

== Contemporary usage ==
"Then He Kissed Me" was the opening song to which Elisabeth Shue danced around her bedroom in Adventures in Babysitting (1987); it was the song in which Ray Liotta and Lorraine Bracco enter the Copacabana on their first real date in the movie Goodfellas (1990); it was featured during the episode 'Homer and Marge Turn a Couple Play' on The Simpsons (2006); it was also featured in the episode 'Stand By Meg' on Family Guy (2018). It was also covered by Asobi Seksu and used on their live album Live at the Echo 10/6/06. "Da Doo Ron Ron" was played during a scene in a dance club in the 1979 film Quadrophenia, and by Russell Ziskey (Harold Ramis) to train ESL students in the 1981 comedy Stripes. "He Hit Me (and It Felt like a Kiss)" was used in the episode 'Mystery Date' on Mad Men (2012). It was also used in the TV miniseries 11.22.63 in episode 4 in 2016.

Crystal was the name of one of the girl group-inspired street urchin characters in the musical Little Shop of Horrors, along with Chiffon and Ronnette. Amy Winehouse cited "He Hit Me (And It Felt Like a Kiss)" as an influence when writing her album Back to Black. The American singer Lana Del Rey used the same phrase in the song "Ultraviolence" in the album of the same name.

== Discography ==
=== Albums ===
==== Studio albums ====
- 1962: Twist Uptown
- 1963: He's a Rebel (US number 131)
- 1986: He's a Rebel featuring Lala Brooks

==== Compilation albums ====
- 1963: The Crystals Sing the Greatest Hits, Volume 1
- 1975: The Crystals Sing Their Greatest Hits
- 1988: Greatest Hits
- 1990: Greatest Hits
- 1992: The Best of the Crystals
- 2004: One Fine Day
- 2011: Da Doo Ron Ron: The Very Best of the Crystals
- 2016: Playlist : The Very Best of the Crystals

=== Singles ===
Year	Single (A-side, B-side) Both sides from same album except where indicated	Lead vocals	Label and number	Chart positions			Album
Year	Single (A-side, B-side) Both sides from same album except where indicated	Lead vocals	Label and number	US	US R&B	UK	Album
1961	"There's No Other (Like My Baby)" b/w "Oh Yeah, Maybe Baby"	A-side: Barbara Alston; B-side: Patsy Wright	Philles 100	20	5	—	Twist Uptown
1962	"Uptown" b/w "What a Nice Way to Turn Seventeen"	Barbara Alston	Philles 102	13	18	—	Twist Uptown
1962	"He Hit Me (and It Felt like a Kiss)" b/w "No One Ever Tells You" (from Twist Uptown)	Barbara Alston	Philles 105	—	—	—	He's a Rebel
1962	"He's a Rebel" b/w "I Love You Eddie"	A-side: Darlene Love; B-side: Barbara Alston	Philles 106	1	2	19	He's a Rebel
1962	"He's Sure the Boy I Love" b/w "Walkin' Along (La La La)" (Non-album instrumental)	Darlene Love	Philles 109	11	18	—	He's a Rebel
1963	"(Let's Dance) The Screw - Part 1" b/w "(Let's Dance) The Screw - Part 2"	Group vocals	Philles 111	—	—	—	Non-Album Tracks
1963	"Da Doo Ron Ron (When He Walked Me Home)" b/w "Git' It" (Non-album instrumental)	Dolores "LaLa" Brooks	Philles 112	3	5	5	The Crystals Sing the Greatest Hits, Volume 1
1963	"Then He Kissed Me" b/w "Brother Julius" (Non-album instrumental)	Dolores "LaLa" Brooks	Philles 115	6	8	2	Today's Hits (Various Philles artists)
1964	"I Wonder" b/w "Little Boy" (UK single)	Dolores "LaLa" Brooks	London 9852	—	—	36	Non-album tracks
1964	"Little Boy" b/w "Harry (From West Virginia) and Milt" (Instrumental)	Dolores "LaLa" Brooks	Philles 119	92	—	—	Non-album tracks
1964	"All Grown Up" b/w "Irving (Jaggered Sixteenths)" (Instrumental)	Dolores "LaLa" Brooks	Philles 122	98	—	—	Non-album tracks
1965	"You Can't Tie a Good Girl Down" b/w "My Place"	Dolores "LaLa" Brooks	United Artists 927	—	—	—	Non-album tracks
1966	"Are You Trying to Get Rid of Me" b/w "I Got a Man"	Dolores "LaLa" Brooks	United Artists 994	—	—	—	Non-album tracks
1967	"Ring-A-Ting-A-Ling" b/w "Should I Keep on Waiting"	A-side: Barbara Alston; B-side: Dee Dee Kennibrew	Michelle 4113	—	—	—	Non-album tracks
"—" denotes releases that did not chart or were not released in that territory.

== Bibliography ==
- Clemente, John (2000). Girl Groups — Fabulous Females That Rocked The World. Iola, Wisc. Krause Publications. pp. 276. ISBN 0-87341-816-6
- Clemente, John (2013). Girl Groups — Fabulous Females Who Rocked The World. Bloomington, IN Authorhouse Publications. pp. 623. ISBN 978-1-4772-7633-4 (sc); ISBN 978-1-4772-8128-4 (e).
