= There's No Other (Like My Baby) =

Single by the Crystals

from the album Twist Uptown
- B-side: "Oh Yeah, Maybe Baby"
- Released: November 1961
- Studio: Gold Star Studios, Hollywood
- Genre: Soul
- Length: 2:29
- Label: Philles
- Songwriter(s): Phil Spector, Leroy Bates
- Producer(s): Phil Spector

The Crystals singles chronology
"There's No Other (Like My Baby)" (1961)	"Uptown" (1962)

"There's No Other (Like My Baby)" is a song first recorded in 1961 by the American girl group the Crystals. It was written by Phil Spector and Leroy Bates. Also produced by Spector, the single was the first release on his newly-founded Philles Records label. Barbara Alston sang lead vocal, as she did on the next two Crystals releases "Uptown" and "He Hit Me (It Felt Like a Kiss)". Spector neglected to pay the Crystals for their work on "There's No Other".

Their debut single, "There's No Other (Like My Baby)" debuted on the Billboard Hot 100 in November 1961 and peaked at number 20 in January 1962 during its 11-week chart run. In 1965, a cover version of by the Beach Boys was included on their album Beach Boys' Party! and subsequently issued as the B-side to their single "The Little Girl I Once Knew". Cash Box described the Beach Boys' version as getting a "laconic, slow-shufflin’ reading."
