= River Deep – Mountain High =

1966 single by Ike & Tina Turner

- Dutch picture sleeve

Single by Ike & Tina Turner

from the album River Deep – Mountain High
- B-side: "I'll Keep You Happy"
- Released: May 1966
- Recorded: March 1966
- Studio: Gold Star, Los Angeles
- Genre: Soul
- Length: 3:40
- Label: Philles (US); London (Europe)
- Songwriters: Phil Spector; Jeff Barry; Ellie Greenwich
- Producer: Phil Spector

Ike & Tina Turner singles chronology
| "Betcha Can't Kiss Me (Just One Time Baby)" (1966) | "River Deep – Mountain High" (1966) | "Anything You Wasn't Born With" (1966) |

Ike & Tina Turner singles chronology
| "The Hunter" (1969) | "River Deep – Mountain High" (1969 reissue) | "I Know" (1969) |

"River Deep – Mountain High" is a song by Ike & Tina Turner released on Philles Records as the title track to their 1966 studio album. Produced by Phil Spector and written by Spector, Jeff Barry and Ellie Greenwich. Rolling Stone ranked "River Deep – Mountain High" No. 33 on their 2004 list of the 500 Greatest Songs of All Time. NME ranked it No. 37 on their list of the 500 Greatest Songs of All Time. The Rock and Roll Hall of Fame added it to the list of the 500 Songs That Shaped Rock and Roll. The song was inducted into the Grammy Hall of Fame in 1999.

The single did not perform well upon its original release in the US, but it was successful in Europe and especially in the UK. Spector claimed to be pleased with the response from the critics and his peers, but he then withdrew from the music industry for two years, beginning his personal decline. After a revival of the song from covers by Eric Burdon and the Animals and Deep Purple in 1968, the original version was reissued by A&M Records in 1969.

== Background ==
Phil Spector had seen the Ike & Tina Turner Revue perform at a club on the Sunset Strip and invited them to appear on The Big T.N.T. Show. Spector was impressed by Tina Turner and wanted to use her voice with the Wrecking Crew, and his "Wall of Sound" production technique. He went to the Turners' house, and struck a deal with Ike Turner to produce Tina. Ike agreed, but wanted the recordings to be credited to Ike & Tina Turner. At the time, they were signed to Loma Records (a subsidiary of Warner Bros.). Spector negotiated a deal with Ike & Tina Turner's manager Bob Krasnow, who was also head of Loma. He offered $20,000 ($198,000 in 2025) to have them released from their contract. After Mike Maitland (then president at Warner Bros.) gave them their release, they signed with Spector's Philles Records.

== Recording ==
"River Deep – Mountain High" was the first recording that Tina Turner did for Philles at Gold Star Studios. It was written by Phil Spector, Jeff Barry and Ellie Greenwich. The track cost a then unheard-of $22,000 ($218,000 in 2025), and required 21 session musicians.

After several rehearsals, and two sessions for the musicians to lay down a backing track, Spector got Tina Turner into the studio on March 7, but she was unable to provide what he wanted. The following week she returned to the studio with Ike Turner. Due to Spector's perfectionism and tendency to abuse workers in the studio, he made her sing the song over and over for several hours until he felt he had the perfect vocal take for the song. She recalled, "I must have sung that 500,000 times. I was drenched with sweat. I had to take my shirt off and stand there in my bra to sing."

The Blossoms, rather than the Ikettes—Turner's usual backing vocalists—provided backing vocals for the song.

It was reported that the Beach Boys' Brian Wilson attended the session, where he sat "transfixed" and "did not say a word."

When Spector inducted Ike & Tina Turner into the Rock and Roll Hall of Fame in 1991, he revealed in his speech that he had invited Ike Turner to play guitar in the session for "River Deep – Mountain High," but Turner did not show up.

The recording of the song was later dramatized for Tina Turner's 1993 biographical film, What's Love Got to Do with It.

== Personnel ==
- Lead vocals: Tina Turner
- Background vocals: Darlene Love, Fanita James, Jean King, Gracia Nitzsche, Clydie King, Leon Russell, Glen Campbell
- Composer lyricists: Phil Spector, Jeff Barry, and Ellie Greenwich
- Producer: Phil Spector
- Arranger: Jack Nitzsche
- Musicians: Leon Russell (keyboards), Michel Rubini (piano, keyboards), Jim Horn (saxophone), Barney Kessel (guitar), Glen Campbell (guitar), Earl Palmer (drums), Carol Kaye (bass), Frank Capp (percussion)

== Release and reception ==
Professional ratings
Review scores
| Source | Rating |
|---|---|
| Record World | 4/4 stars |

Reviewing the single, Billboard wrote: "Exciting dance beat production backs a wailin' Tina vocal on a solid rock tune penned by Barry and Greenwich." Record World predicted that "this will be known as the classic Phil Spector record," stating that "everything goes on while Tina screams her love lyric." It entered the lower end of the Billboard Hot 100 and stopped at No. 88 on the pop chart. The disappointing chart performance resulted in the album being shelved in the US. Spector was so disillusioned that he ceased involvement in the recording industry totally for two years, and only intermittently returned to the studio after that. He effectively became a recluse and began to self-destruct.

Ike Turner remarked that "if Phil had released the record and put anybody else's name on it, it would have been a huge hit. But because Tina Turner's name was on it, the white stations classified it an R&B record and wouldn't play it. The white stations say it was too black, and the black stations say it was too white, so that record didn't have a home."

Writer Michael Billig speculated that although earlier records which had mixed black singers with a white pop sound had sold well, by 1966 the black political movement was encouraging African Americans to take pride in their own culture, and "River Deep – Mountain High" was out of step with that movement.

The single, released on London Records in Europe, was a hit overseas. It peaked at No. 3 in the UK, No. 9 in the Netherlands, and it reached No. 1 in Spain.

George Harrison praised the record, declaring it "a perfect record from start to finish. You couldn't improve on it."

== Reissues ==
After "River Deep – Mountain High" was revived by other bands, Ike & Tina Turner's original version was reissued by A&M Records in 1969. It has since gained the recognition Spector wanted for the record. Reviewing the single, Record World called it a "classic, perhaps the greatest single of all time."

Ike & Tina Turner recorded different renditions of the song without Spector's "Wall of Sound" production style. A version on the 1973 album Nutbush City Limits was released as a single titled "River Deep, Mountain High 1974" on United Artists Records in France. Another version from an undetermined year was released on the 1991 compilation Proud Mary: The Best of Ike & Tina Turner.

Tina Turner recorded a few solo versions, in 1986, 1991 and 1993. She included live performances on her albums, Tina Live in Europe and Tina Live.

== Chart performance ==
Original release
| Chart (1966) | Peak position |
|---|---|
| Australia (Go-Set) | 14 |
| Australia (Billboard) | 8 |
| Belgium (Ultratop 50 Wallonia) | 26 |
| Canada Top Singles (RPM) | 62 |
| Ireland (IRMA) | 12 |
| Netherlands (Single Top 100) | 9 |
| Netherlands (Dutch Top 40) | 9 |
| Spain (Los 40 Principales) | 1 |
| Sweden (Tio i Topp) | 15 |
| UK Singles (Official Charts) | 3 |
| US Billboard Hot 100 | 88 |
| US Cash Box Looking Ahead | 105 |
| US Cash Box Top 50 R&B | 36 |
| US Record World 100 Top Pops | 91 |
| US Record World Top 50 R&B | 41 |

1969 reissue
| Chart | Peak position |
|---|---|
| Canada Top Singles (RPM) | 57 |
| Holland | 8 |
| UK Singles (Official Charts) | 33 |
| US Billboard Bubbling Under Hot 100 | 112 |
| US Cash Box Looking Ahead | 129 |
| US Record World 100 Top Pops | 95 |

== Certifications ==
| Region | Certification | Certified units/sales |
|---|---|---|
| United Kingdom (BPI) | Gold | 400,000^{‡} |
^{‡} Sales+streaming figures based on certification alone.

== The Supremes and the Four Tops version ==
"River Deep – Mountain High"
- 1970 Dutch single

Single by the Supremes and the Four Tops

from the album The Magnificent 7
- B-side: "Together We Can Make Such Sweet Music"
- Released: 1970
- Genre: Soul; pop
- Length: 3:13 (single version) 4:50 (album version)
- Label: Motown Records
- Songwriters: Phil Spector; Jeff Barry; Ellie Greenwich
- Producer: Ashford & Simpson

The Supremes singles chronology
| "Stoned Love" (1970) | "River Deep – Mountain High" (1970) | "Nathan Jones" (1971) |

The Four Tops singles chronology
| "It's All in the Game" (1970) | "River Deep – Mountain High" (1970) | "Just Seven Numbers (Can Straighten Out My Life)" (1971) |

In 1970, their post-Diana Ross era, the Supremes and the Four Tops released a version. Produced by Nickolas Ashford and Valerie Simpson, the single was one of several recordings that paired the two Motown groups. The Supremes and Four Tops cover, included on the 1970 LP The Magnificent 7, with its soaring vocals and string section, peaked at No. 7 on the soul chart and No. 14 on the Billboard Hot 100 in 1971, making it the highest-charting version of the song in the United States. Their version also peaked No. 11 on the UK Singles Chart, No. 23 in Belgium, and No. 25 on Netherlands' MegaCharts.

=== Charts ===
==== Weekly charts ====
| Chart (1970–1971) | Peak position |
|---|---|
| Belgium (Ultratop 50 Flanders) | 23 |
| Belgium (Ultratop 50 Wallonia) | 35 |
| Canada Top Singles (RPM) | 20 |
| Ireland (IRMA) | 12 |
| Netherlands (Dutch Top 40) | 27 |
| Netherlands (Single Top 100) | 25 |
| South Africa (Springbok Radio) | 14 |
| UK Singles (Official Charts) | 11 |
| US Billboard Hot 100 | 14 |
| US Hot R&B/Hip-Hop Songs (Billboard) | 7 |
| US Cashbox Top 100 | 15 |
| US Cashbox R&B | 2 |
| US Record World Singles | 12 |
| US Record World R&B Singles | 3 |

==== Year-end charts ====
| Chart (1971) | Rank |
|---|---|
| US Cashbox R&B | 55 |

== Other notable covers ==
A ten-minute version was recorded by Deep Purple for their 1968 album, The Book of Taliesyn. An edited version was released as a single in the United States and reached number 53 in early 1969 and number 42 on the Canadian RPM charts. It had a progressive rock sound to it, as Deep Purple had not yet adopted the hard rock sound for which they are most famous.

Celine Dion covered the song on her 1996 album Falling into You. At first, Phil Spector showed interest in producing the album track, but left the project; Jim Steinman took over as producer. Spector was unimpressed by Steinman's efforts, calling Steinman a "bad clone" of himself. Dion had previously performed the song in some of her concerts, as included in her live album Live à Paris, recorded in 1995.

Amber Riley and Naya Rivera covered the song on episode four ("Duets") of the second season of Fox television show Glee. Their version peaked at number 41 on the Billboard Hot 100.

Christina Aguilera performed the song at the 2021 Rock and Roll Hall of Fame induction ceremony in tribute to Tina Turner.

England women's national football team footballer Rachel Daly led a karaoke rendition of the song during the Lionesses' victory parade in Trafalgar Square, London following the team's historic win at Euro 2022 at Wembley Stadium

Beyoncé performed a shortened version of the song throughout majority of the Renaissance World Tour (2023) as a tribute to Tina following her death, which occurred a week before the tour began.

Harry Nilsson sang a cover version of the song. It was also used on Blue Peter in 1972 to introduce Lesley Judd who taught the then current presenters a dance to song.
