= Dolores Kenniebrew =

American singer (born 1945)

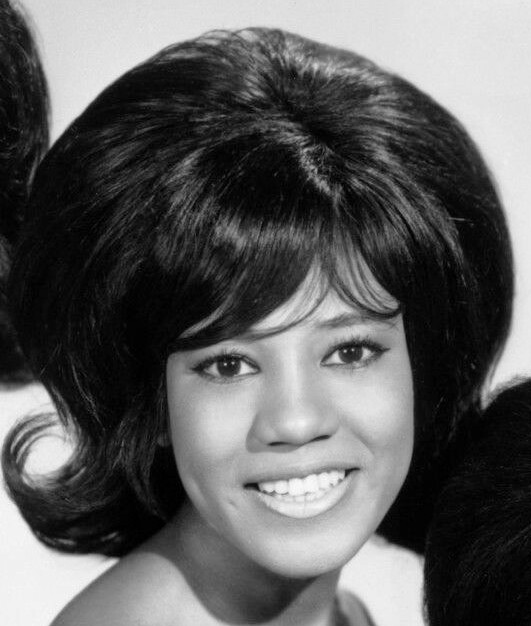
- Kenniebrew in 1963

Background information
- Also known as: Dee Dee
- Born: July 9, 1945 (age 81); Brooklyn, New York, U.S.
- Occupation: Singer
- Years active: 1960–present
- Member of: The Crystals

Dolores "Dee Dee" Kenniebrew (born July 9, 1945) is an American singer, best known for her work with the trio The Crystals. She was born as Dolores Kenniebrew and grew up in Crown Heights, Brooklyn, New York. In 1960, at age 15, she was invited to sing in the girl group the Crystals. The group was formed by a band musician named Benny Wells who would soon become the group's manager. Wells was the uncle of Kenniebrew's bandmate Barbara Alston. Although she rarely sang lead on their songs (her voice was, according to her bandmate, Barbara Alston, "too high and soft"), she was the only member who stayed in the group from their formation to their disbanding. With the Crystals, she enjoyed a successful (but not very long) career in music. Their hits began to dry up after 1964 and they disbanded two years later.

In 1971, Kenniebrew and her former bandmates (Dolores "LaLa" Brooks, Mary Thomas, and Barbara Alston) reunited to tour and perform on the oldies circuit. However, in 1973, they disbanded again to devote their times to their families. According to Kenniebrew's Facebook page, in 2005 she and original Crystals Alston and Brooks performed together at the Vocal Group Hall of Fame, where girl-group postage stamps were unveiled.

Since the 1980s, she has kept the Crystals active in performing, but as a trio with two non-original members.
