= Dolores "LaLa" Brooks =

American singer (born 1947)

La La Brooks
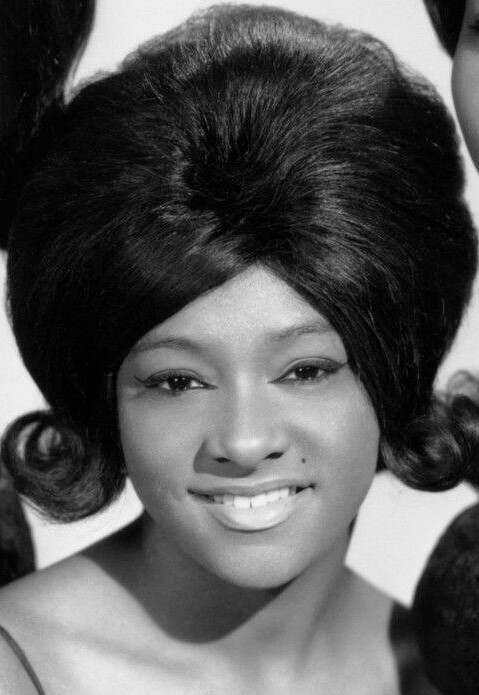
- Brooks in 1963

Background information
- Also known as: Sakinah Muhammad
- Born: Dolores Brooks; June 20, 1947 (age 79); New York, U.S.
- Genres: Rock and roll; R&B; pop
- Occupations: Singer; songwriter; actress; radio personality
- Years active: 1962–present
- Website: lalabrooks.com

Dolores Brooks (born June 20, 1947), also known as Sakinah Muhammad or La La Brooks, is an American singer and actress. She is best known as the third lead singer of the girl group The Crystals and the lead vocalist on the Crystals' hits "Then He Kissed Me" and "Da Doo Ron Ron".

== About ==
Brooks was the second youngest of 11 children, born to a Native American mother and an African-American father.

Brooks first displayed her talent by singing gospel music in church. At age seven, she took part in her siblings' gospel group, Little Gospel Tears, and sang in Brooklyn. While attending PS 73, she was discovered in an after-school program by Dolores "Dee Dee" Kenniebrew and her mother, who invited Brooks to join the Crystals as a replacement for a departing member. She joined the group to replace Myrna Girard (who was pregnant) on the March 1962 release "Uptown".

After leaving the Crystals, she married jazz and session musician Idris Muhammad (born Leo Morris) in 1966; the union brought two sons and two daughters. Shortly thereafter, she converted to Islam with him, changing her name to Sakinah Muhammad. She helped Idris write and record his material over the years. In 1968, she appeared in the original Broadway production of the musical Hair, where she sometimes performed the song "Aquarius". She later appeared in the Broadway show Two Gentlemen of Verona in 1971. She also toured with, and recorded for, various artists, such as the Neville Brothers, Bobby Womack and Isaac Hayes. She made short appearances in films, and contributed songs to different movie soundtracks (including the 1970 film Cotton Comes to Harlem). In 1971, she reunited with Kenniebrew, Mary Thomas, and Barbara Alston as the Crystals, and toured and performed in rock-&-roll revival shows. Their touring lasted until 1973, when the members decided to devote their time to their families.

In 1983, she and her family moved to London, England, where she and Idris continued their careers in music. In 1990, they moved to Vienna, Austria, where she continued singing and writing songs with Idris, and also hosted a local radio show. They lived in Vienna until 1997. Andrew Edge sang backing vocals on her BMG (Austria) CD LaLa Brooks & Friends in 1994. In 1999, she and Idris divorced.

Brooks moved back to the United States in about 2000 and resides in the East Village, New York.

Brooks, with her musical group, is back performing around the world.

== Discography ==
=== With the Crystals ===
Albums

- 1962: Twist Uptown
- 1963: He's a Rebel (US #131)

Compilation albums

- 1963: The Crystals Sing the Greatest Hits, Volume 1
- 1986: He's a Rebel - The Crystals featuring La La Brooks (Jango Records)
- 1992: The Best of The Crystals
- 2011: Da Doo Ron Ron: The Very Best of The Crystals

Singles

- 1963: "Da Doo Ron Ron" (US #3, UK #5 and UK #15 on re-issue in 1974)
- 1963: "Then He Kissed Me" (US #6, UK #2)
- 1964: "I Wonder" (UK #36)
- 1964: "Little Boy" (US #92)
- 1964: "All Grown Up" (US #98)

=== With Idris Muhammad ===
- Peace and Rhythm (Prestige, 1971)
- My Turn (Lipstick, 1992)

=== Solo ===
Albums

- La La Brooks and Friends (RCA, 1996)
- All or Nothing (Norton, 2014)

Singles

- "Going Home" (from Cotton Comes to Harlem) (United Artists, 1970; reissued by Beyond, 2001; billed as Sakinah)
