= The Blossoms =

American girl group

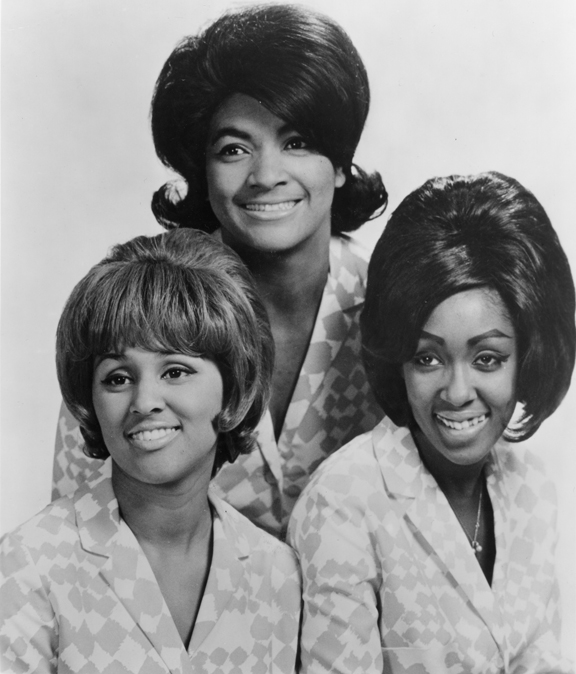
- The Blossoms in 1966; Left to right: Darlene Love, Fanita James and Jean King

Background information
- Also known as: The Dreamers; The Playgirls; The Rollettes; The Rebelettes
- Origin: Los Angeles, California, U.S.
- Genres: R&B; pop; rock and roll; soul
- Years active: 1954–1990; 2000–2023
- Labels: Capitol; Philles; Challenge; Bell; RCA; Reprise; Ode; MGM; Lion
- Past members: Fanita James; Gloria Jones; Nanette Williams; Annette Williams; Jewel Cobbs; Pat Howard; Darlene Love; Gracia Nitzsche; Edna Wright; Carolyn Willis; Jean King; Stephanie Spruill; Alex Brown; Cynthia Woodward

The Blossoms were an American girl group that originated from California. During their height of success in the 1960s, the group's lineup consisted of Darlene Love, Fanita James, and Jean King.

Although the group had a recording career in their own right, they were most famous for being the group to actually record the No. 1 hit "He's a Rebel" (which producer Phil Spector credited to the Crystals), and for providing backing vocals for many of the biggest hits of the 1960s.

== History ==
=== Early years ===
Their career began in Los Angeles, California, United States, at John C. Fremont High School in 1954. Originally the group was a sextet of young girls singing for fun. Calling themselves The Dreamers, the group originally sang spirituals, since two of the members had parents who were against their daughters singing secular rhythm and blues music, which was popular on the radio during the early 1950s.

Fanita Barrett (later known as Fanita James; August 13, 1938 – November 23, 2023), Gloria A. Jones (born September 12, 1938;not to be confused with Gloria Jones of "Tainted Love" fame), Jewel Cobbs, Pat Howard and twin sisters Annette and Nanette Williams all came from musical backgrounds. The twins had taken vocal and dancing lessons as youngsters. Fanita's brother Ronald was already a success with his vocal group, The Meadowlarks.

The Dreamers joined Richard Berry in the studio and, during 1955 and 1956, made several recordings for Flair and RPM Records.

The Dreamers signed with Capitol Records. Even though signing to Capitol was considered a step up, the group's stay at Capitol was short – yielding only three singles – none of which made the charts. The Blossoms also underwent significant changes at this time. By 1958, Nanette Williams was married, pregnant, and planning a leave of absence from the group.

Darlene Wright (later known as Darlene Love) replaced Nanette and was selected to be the lead, which the ensemble-based Blossoms had not previously had. The addition of Wright changed the style of the group but chart success was still elusive, despite Wright's unique presence as lead, on songs like "No Other Love" for Capitol in 1958, "Sugarbeat" for RCA (as the Playgirls) in 1960 and "Write Me A Letter" for Challenge in 1961.

The group provided back-up vocals to Sam Cooke's 1959 hit, "Everybody Loves to Cha Cha Cha".

=== The 1960s ===
During the summer of 1962, the Blossoms were finally successful on the charts, although their biggest hit song, "He's a Rebel", was not credited to them. Producer Phil Spector had learned that Vikki Carr was soon to record "He's a Rebel" for Liberty Records as her debut single, and decided he had to rush his own version to stores. Since the Crystals (his biggest girl group at the time) were touring on the east coast at the time, the Blossoms were instead brought in to record the track. However, when Spector released the record, the song was instead credited to the Crystals (much to the dismay of the actual Crystals). The Blossoms in turn received only a meager session fee (Darlene Love states they were paid "triple scale") and are not credited for contributing to the record. The song peaked at No. 1 on the Billboard Hot 100 and firmly established Spector as a force in the music industry. Over the next three years, the Blossoms, with Wright as lead, would be the favored singers on all of Spector's sessions recorded in California.

Wright and Barrett sang with Bobby Sheen as Bob B. Soxx & the Blue Jeans. This combo achieved hit singles for Spector, including a version of the Disney song "Zip-a-Dee-Doo-Dah". They sang background on Love's Christmas (Baby Please Come Home).

Spector also used the Blossoms as the prime backing group for the Righteous Brothers' "You've Lost That Lovin' Feelin', which was a No. 1 hit in 1964 in the U.S. and in the U.K.. Helping out too with the crescendo was Cher, who had previously sung for Spector on recordings by The Ronettes, including "Be My Baby", which also featured the Blossoms.

Although the Blossoms were attempting to establish themselves as primary artists, they still contributed backing vocals behind many of the biggest hits of the 1960s including "Monster Mash" by Bobby "Boris" Pickett and Shelley Fabares' "Johnny Angel", and the Blossoms lead singer Wright's solo efforts (which included "He's Sure the Boy I Love", although again Spector credited the song to the Crystals). Fabares has said that her strongest memory of that recording session was the "beautiful voices of the backup singers".

In 1964, the group was reduced to a trio of Wright (now Love), Barrett (now James), and newcomer Jean King. They were a featured part of a relatively successful weekly rock' n' roll television program called Shindig!. The Blossoms used their vocal versatility to their advantage, singing in various styles behind a cross-section of artists, including Patty Duke, Shelley Fabares, Jackie Wilson, Aretha Franklin, and Marvin Gaye.

The Blossoms appeared in 1964's T.A.M.I. Show providing backup vocals and dancing for all of Marvin Gaye's songs; their name appeared in the opening credits, but they were not introduced. They are later seen at stage left encouraging an exhausted James Brown to take the stage one last time after his climactic performance of "Night Train" with his singing group, The Famous Flames. In 1966, they provided background vocals on Ike & Tina Turner's "River Deep – Mountain High". In 1968, they appeared in Elvis Presley’s TV special, popularly known as "the '68 Comeback". Their single, "Good Good Lovin'", became a hit, peaking at #101 on the Billboard Hot 100 in 1966. It later peaked at #115 on the same chart, and at #45 R&B. The Blossoms also provided backing vocals for Doris Day's "Move Over, Darling" from the film of the same name. They resumed recording under their own name later in the 1960s for labels such as Reprise, Ode, and MGM. While with Ode, they recorded a pop–gospel version of Laura Nyro's "Stoney End", which was first released in 1967 as the B-side to the "Wonderful" single, and then again in 1969 as an A-side single. They had scored their hit in the R&B chart entry, entitled "Good, Good Lovin'" in that same year. They recorded their only album, Shockwave, in 1972 for Lion Records. The album appeared on Billboard's New LP/Tape Releases. It also appeared on a review from Billboard and also on the Best New Album of the Week list.

=== 1970s–2023 ===
Love left the Blossoms in mid-1973 after a backstage incident caused the group to be fired as the backing singers for Dionne Warwick. Following a hiatus the group brought singer Stephanie Spruill in as a replacement, returning to live work in 1974 with Tom Jones.

After that, singer Alex Brown, who briefly filled in for Jean King in the 1960s, took Love's spot for a brief time until Cynthia Woodward replaced her full time. On her own, Love was pursued for a contract with Gamble & Huff's label Philadelphia International Records, but through a contractual loophole ended up recording for Warner/Spector Records.

Jean King died of a heart attack in Las Vegas in March 1983. James kept the Blossoms going with varying personnel, performing on the Las Vegas circuit until 1990, when she became a backing singer for Doris Kenner Jackson of the Shirelles. Following Doris Kenner Jackson's death in 2000 from breast cancer, James revived the Blossoms with original member Gloria Jones and a new third member.

In 2013, the Blossoms (namely Love, James, Wright, and Jones) were highlighted in the Oscar-winning documentary 20 Feet From Stardom, in which it was revealed that they had also sung backing vocals for Bobby "Boris" Pickett's "Monster Mash", Frank Sinatra's version of "That's Life", and Merry Clayton's version of "the Shoop Shoop Song (It's in His Kiss)".

Original member of the Dreamers and Blossoms, Annette Williams, died on August 1, 2023. Just a few months later fellow founding member Fanita James died on November 23, 2023, at the age of 85. Nanette Williams-Lambert died at the age of 87 on March 24, 2026.

== Members ==
- Fanita James (1954–1990, 2000–2023; died 2023)
- Gloria Jones (1954–1962, 2000–2023)
- Annette Williams (1954–1960; died 2023)
- Nanette Williams (1954–1958; died 2026)
- Jewel Cobbs (1954)
- Pat Howard (1954)
- Darlene Love (1958–1973)
- Gracia Nitzsche (1962–1964)
- Edna Wright (1962–1964; died 2020)
- Carolyn Willis (1962–1964)
- Jean King (1964–1983; died 1983)
- Stephanie Spruill (c. 1973)
- Alex Brown (1974)
- Cynthia Woodward (c. 1975–?)

== Discography ==
=== Albums ===
- Shockwave (1972, Lion Records)

=== Singles ===
List of charting singles

| Year | Song title | US Charts | US R&B Charts |
|---|---|---|---|
| 1961 | "Son–In–Law" | 79 | – |
| 1966 | "That's When the Tears Start" | 128 | – |
| 1966 | "Good, Good Lovin'" | 101 | – |
| 1967 | "Good, Good Lovin'" | 115 | 45 |

== Filmography ==
| Year | Film | Role |
|---|---|---|
| 2013 | 20 Feet from Stardom | Background singers |
