= He Hit Me (And It Felt Like a Kiss) =

Single by the Crystals
- B-side: "No One Ever Tells You"
- Released: 1962
- Recorded: 1962
- Genre: Pop rock; pop soul; Brill Building
- Label: Philles
- Songwriters: Gerry Goffin; Carole King
- Producer: Phil Spector

The Crystals singles chronology
"Uptown" (1962)	"He Hit Me (And It Felt Like a Kiss)" (1962)	"He's a Rebel" (1962)

"He Hit Me (And It Felt Like a Kiss)" is a song written by Gerry Goffin and Carole King for girl group the Crystals under the guidance of Phil Spector in 1962. Goffin and King wrote the song after discovering that their babysitter and singer "Little Eva" Boyd was being regularly beaten by her boyfriend. When they inquired why she tolerated such treatment, Eva replied, with complete sincerity, that her boyfriend's actions were motivated by his love for her.

== Production ==
Phil Spector's arrangement was ominous and ambiguous.

It was a brutal song, as any attempt to justify such violence must be, and Spector's arrangement only amplified its savagery, framing Barbara Alston's lone vocal amid a sea of caustic strings and funereal drums, while the backing vocals almost trilled their own belief that the boy had done nothing wrong. In more ironic hands (and a more understanding age), 'He Hit Me' might have passed at least as satire. But Spector showed no sign of appreciating that, nor did he feel any need to. No less than the song's writers, he was not preaching, he was merely documenting.

— Dave Thompson

== Release ==
Upon its initial release, "He Hit Me" received some airplay, but then there was a widespread protest of the song, with many concluding that the song was an endorsement of spousal abuse.

The final scene of the 1930 Frank Borzage film Liliom contains the lines: "He hit me. I heard the sound of it. But it didn't hurt, Mother. It felt just like a kiss". The film was not a success and nothing suggests that Goffin or King had seen it. Liliom, originally a play by Hungarian playwright Ferenc Molnár, was the basis for the Rodgers and Hammerstein musical classic, Carousel. While King and Goffin may not have seen Liliom, it is possible that they were familiar with the successful 1956 film version of Carousel, which contains essentially the same line. However, King has stated that Little Eva, their babysitter who inspired the song, had used that exact phrase to them.

Carole King, in that same radio interview, said that she was sorry she had ever had anything to do with the song. She was a survivor of repeated domestic abuse (but not from Goffin, who had been her husband from 1959 to 1969).

== Notable cover versions ==
- 1982 – The song was on 1982's All For One album by The Motels.
- 1995 - Hole performed it on MTV Unplugged, Courtney Love ended the song by calling it a feminist anthem.
- 2007 – Grizzly Bear, performed the song during the headlining tour for their album Yellow House. They also recorded the song during a Daytrotter session in February 2007, to be made available online for download. A studio version of the song was released on the band's Friend EP while a live take was released as the B-side to "While You Wait for the Others" on the Live on KCRW 7".
- 2021 – Veronica Swift, This Bitter World (Mack Avenue Records)
