= Larry Levine =

American recording engineer (1928–2008)

Background information
- Born: May 8, 1928; New York City, New York, U.S.
- Died: May 8, 2008 (aged 80) Encino, California, U.S.
- Occupation: Recording engineer
- Label: A&M
- Website: larrylevinerecordingengineer.com

Larry Levine (May 8, 1928 – May 8, 2008) was an American audio engineer, known for his collaboration with Phil Spector on the Wall of Sound recording technique.

== Biography ==
Levine left the U.S. military in 1952. When he got back, he would often hang out at Gold Star Studios because his cousin Stan Ross and friend Dave Gold both worked there. He was able to get training as a recording engineer at no cost to the studio through the G.I. Bill.

Levine was responsible for getting the "Wall of Sound" sound for Phil Spector while working with the Wrecking Crew at legendary Goldstar Studios in Hollywood, CA. Included on Spector's hits were, "Be My Baby" "Then He Kissed Me", "River Deep, Mountain High" "A Christmas Gift for You from Phil Spector" and many other hits.

Levine was also credited with engineering and getting a new sound from Eddie Cochran also done at Goldstar Studios that pioneered a new era of Rock & Roll that hadn't been heard before.

Levine engineered "You've Lost That Lovin Feelin" from the Righteous Brothers that turned out to be the most played song in the history of American Radio to this day.

Levine received the 1966 Grammy Award for Best Engineered Recording - Non-Classical, for the recording of "A Taste of Honey" performed by Herb Alpert & the Tijuana Brass. The recording also won the Grammy Award for Record of the Year in 1966.

Herb Alpert and Jerry Moss asked Levine to leave Goldstar to become Chief Engineer at A&M Records in 1967. They just purchased the Charlie Chaplain lot and Levine was the driving force in building A&M Records by hiring the engineers and getting the equipment needed.

Among his other known recording engineering contributions is the Beach Boys' influential 1966 album Pet Sounds.

Levine died of emphysema in Encino, California on his 80th birthday.
