= Cynthia Weil =

American songwriter (1940–2023)

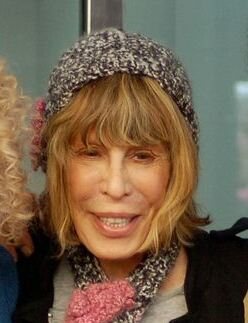
- Cynthia Weil in 2012
- Born: October 18, 1940; New York City, U.S.
- Died: June 1, 2023 (aged 82); Beverly Hills, California, U.S.
- Education: Sarah Lawrence College
- Occupation: Songwriter
- Spouse: Barry Mann (m. 1961)
- Children: Jenn Mann

Cynthia Weil (October 18, 1940 – June 1, 2023) was an American lyricist who wrote many songs together with her husband Barry Mann. Weil and Mann were inducted into the Songwriters Hall of Fame in 1987, and in 2011, they jointly received the Johnny Mercer Award, the highest honor bestowed by that Hall of Fame. She and her husband were inducted into the Rock and Roll Hall of Fame in 2010.

Weil and her husband, both based at the Brill Building, were instrumental in shaping the sound of rock and roll in the 1960s, alongside other luminaries such as Carole King, Burt Bacharach, and Neil Diamond.

== Life and career ==
Weil was born in New York City on October 18, 1940. She grew up on the Upper West Side and the Upper East Side of Manhattan in a Conservative Jewish family. Her father was Morris Weil, a furniture store owner and the son of Lithuanian-Jewish immigrants, and her mother was Dorothy Mendez, who grew up in a Sephardic Jewish family in Brooklyn. Weil trained as an actress and dancer, studying theater at Sarah Lawrence College, but soon demonstrated a songwriting ability that led to her collaboration with Barry Mann, whom she married in August 1961. The couple had one daughter, Jenn Mann. Weil became one of the Brill Building songwriters of the 1960s, and one of the most important writers during the emergence of rock and roll.

Weil and her husband went on to create songs for many contemporary artists, winning several Grammy Awards as well as Academy Award nominations for their compositions for film. As their Rock and Roll Hall of Fame biography put it, in part: "Mann and Weil's ... [works went from] epic ballads ('On Broadway', 'You've Lost That Lovin' Feelin'') to outright rockers ('Kicks', 'We Gotta Get Out of This Place') [and they also] placed an emphasis on meaningful lyrics in their songwriting. With Weil writing the words and Mann the music, they came up with a number of songs that addressed such serious subjects as racial and economic divides[,] 'Uptown', ...and the difficult reality of making it in the big city ('On Broadway'). 'Only in America' ... tackled segregation and racism, making it rather too controversial for the Drifters, who were the intended artists. 'We Gotta Get Out of This Place' became an anthem for [the] Vietnam soldier, antiwar protesters, and young people who viewed it as an anthem of greater opportunities."

In 1987, she was inducted with her husband into the Songwriters Hall of Fame. In 1988, Weil won two awards at the 30th Annual Grammy Awards for co-writing "Somewhere Out There" from the animated film An American Tail: Song of the Year and Best Song Written for Visual Media.

In 2004, Mann and Weil's They Wrote That? a musical revue based on their songs, opened in New York. In it, Mann sang and Weil related stories about the songs and their personal history. Weil and Mann were inducted into the Rock and Roll Hall of Fame in 2010 in the Ahmet Ertegun Award category. "From the bottom of my heart and with the greatest humility," Weil said in her acceptance, "I thought you guys would never ask." In 2011, Mann and Weil received the Johnny Mercer Award, the highest honor from the Songwriters Hall of Fame.

In 2015, Weil published her first novel, I'm Glad I Did, a mystery set in 1963.

Weil was inducted into the Women Songwriters Hall of Fame in 2023.

Weil died at home in Beverly Hills, California, on June 1, 2023, at age 82.

== Songs written by Barry Mann and Cynthia Weil ==
Sources:

- "A World of Our Own" – Closing theme song from the 1991 film Return to the Blue Lagoon – Surface
- "Absolutely Green" – Dom DeLuise (co-written with Mann for the 1994 animated film A Troll in Central Park).
- "Beyond the Last Island" – Adam Ryen (co-written with James Horner for the animated film Ten Apples Up on Top!).
- "Black Butterfly" – Deniece Williams
- "Blame It on the Bossa Nova" – Eydie Gormé
- "Bless You" – Tony Orlando
- "Christmas Vacation" – Title song for the 1989 film of the same name
- "Don't Know Much" – Aaron Neville and Linda Ronstadt (also, earlier, Bill Medley and Bette Midler)
- ”He’s So Shy” - The Pointer Sisters
- "He's Sure the Boy I Love" – The Crystals
- "Heart" – Kenny Chandler
- "Here You Come Again" – Dolly Parton
- "Home of the Brave" – Bonnie and the Treasures, Jody Miller (also exists in an acetate demo by The Ronettes)
- "How Can I Tell Her It's Over" – Andy Williams
- "Hungry" – Paul Revere & the Raiders
- "I Just Can't Help Believing" – B. J. Thomas, Elvis Presley
- "I'm Gonna Be Strong" – Gene Pitney; covered by Cyndi Lauper
- ”I’m on the Road” - The Partridge Family
- "I Will Come to You" – Hanson
- "It's Not Easy" – Normie Rowe, The Will-O-Bees
- "Just a Little Lovin' (Early in the Morning)" – Dusty Springfield, Carmen McRae, Barbra Streisand, Billy Eckstine, Bobby Vinton
- "Just Once" – James Ingram with Quincy Jones
- "Kicks" – Paul Revere & the Raiders
- "Late at Night" – George Benson and Vicki Randle
- "Let Me In" (Rick Derringer/Weil) – Rick Derringer
- "Looking Through the Eyes of Love" – Gene Pitney, Marlena Shaw, The Partridge Family
- "Love Doesn't Ask Why" – co-written with Phil Galdston. Recorded by Celine Dion.
- "Love Her" – The Everly Bros, The Walker Bros.
- "Love is Only Sleeping" – The Monkees
- "Magic Town" – The Vogues
- "Make Your Own Kind of Music" – "Mama" Cass Elliot
- "Never Gonna Let You Go" – Sérgio Mendes and Dionne Warwick
- "Nobody But You" – Gladys Knight and Ruby Turner
- "None of Us Are Free" (Mann, Weil, Brenda Russell) – Ray Charles, Lynyrd Skynyrd, Solomon Burke
- "On Broadway" – The Drifters, Eric Carmen, and later George Benson, Neil Young, Gary Numan
- "Only in America" – Jay and the Americans
- "Remember" – Song from the 2004 film Troy – Covered by Josh Groban
- "Running with the Night" (Lionel Richie, Weil) – Richie
- "Saturday Night at the Movies" (The Drifters)
- "Shades of Gray" – The Monkees
- "Shape of Things to Come" – Max Frost and the Troopers
- "Somewhere Out There" – Linda Ronstadt and James Ingram (written with James Horner for the 1986 animated film An American Tail) – a double Grammy Award winner.
- "Sweet Survivor" – Peter, Paul, and Mary – written with Peter Yarrow; from the LP "Reunion", 1978.
- ”Through the Fire” - Chaka Khan (written with David Foster and Tom P. Keane)
- "Uptown" – The Crystals, covered by Bette Midler
- "Walking in the Rain" – The Ronettes, Jay and the Americans
- "We Gotta Get Out of This Place" – The Animals and covered by The Angels
- "Where Have You Been (All My Life)" – Arthur Alexander, also played by Gene Vincent, Gerry and the Pacemakers, The Beatles recorded live December 31, 1962, at the Star Club, Hamburg, Germany;
- "(You're My) Soul and Inspiration" – The Righteous Brothers and later Donny & Marie Osmond
- "You've Lost That Lovin' Feelin'" co-written with Phil Spector – The Righteous Brothers; later numerous other artists including Dionne Warwick, Daryl Hall & John Oates, and a Roberta Flack-Donny Hathaway duet. As of 2010, the Righteous Brothers' rendition was radio's most-played song of all time, with 14 million airplays to date.

== Bibliography ==
- Weil, Cynthia (2015). I'm Glad I Did. Soho Press. ISBN 978-1-61695-357-7.
- Weil, Cynthia (2018). 806: A Novel. Tanglewood. ISBN 978-1-939100-26-9.
