= The Very Best of the Righteous Brothers: Unchained Melody =

Greatest hits album by The Righteous Brothers
- Released: 1990
- Labels: Verve; Polydor
- Producers: Phil Spector; Bill Medley

The Righteous Brothers chronology
Unchained Melody – Best of Righteous Brothers (1990)	The Very Best of the Righteous Brothers: Unchained Melody (1990)

The Very Best of the Righteous Brothers: Unchained Melody is a compilation album by American musical duo The Righteous Brothers, consisting of singers Bill Medley and Bobby Hatfield. It was released in 1990 by Verve and Polydor Records following the reissue of the duo's 1965 single, "Unchained Melody", which had been featured in a scene in the 1990 film Ghost, starring Patrick Swayze and Demi Moore. The reissue of the single led to it becoming an international hit again, including reaching number one in the UK singles chart for four weeks, where it became the best-selling single of 1990 and creating a resurgence of popularity for the duo.

== Critical reception ==
Professional ratings
Review scores
Source	Rating
AllMusic	4.5/5 stars

In a review for AllMusic, Stephen Thomas Erlewine wrote that the compilation "is considerably lighter than the ambitious [1989] double-disc Rhino [Records] Anthology, and it doesn't cover nearly as much ground; in other words, no 'Rock & Roll Heaven' or any other '70s material is here." However, he went on to opine that "[F]or those listeners who want a straight-up dose of the biggest Righteous Brothers' hits, this offers the peaks of their peak, highlighted, naturally, by 'You've Lost That Lovin' Feelin',' 'Unchained Melody,' '(You're My) Soul and Inspiration,' and 'Little Latin Lupe Lu'."

== Track listing ==
No.	Title	Writer(s)	Length
1.	"You've Lost That Lovin' Feelin'"	Phil Spector; Barry Mann; Cynthia Weil	3:49
2.	"Unchained Melody"	Alex North; Hy Zaret	3:38
3.	"(You're My) Soul and Inspiration"	Mann; Weil	3:24
4.	"Ebb Tide"	Robert Maxwell; Carl Sigman	2:50
5.	"Just Once in My Life"	Spector; Gerry Goffin; Carole King	3:52
6.	"The White Cliffs of Dover"	Walter Kent; Nat Burton	2:15
7.	"He"	Jack Richards; Richard Mullan	3:03
8.	"Hung on You"	Spector; Goffin; King	3:26
9.	"Little Latin Lupe Lu"	Bill Medley	2:22
10.	"Go Ahead and Cry"	Medley	2:38
11.	"See That Girl"	Mann; Weil	3:13
12.	"On this Side of Goodbye"	Goffin; King	3:10

== Production ==
Adapted from the album's liner notes.

- Phil Spector – producer (tracks 1, 2, 4–6, 8)
- Bill Medley – producer (tracks 3, 7, 9–12)
- Compiled by Bill Levenson
- Mastered from the original master tapes by Bill Inglot and Ken Parry at A&M Studios, Los Angeles

== Charts ==
Chart performance for The Very Best of The Righteous Brothers: Unchained Melody
Chart (1990–1991)	Peak position
Australian Albums (ARIA)	38
New Zealand Albums (RMNZ)	1
UK Albums (Official Charts)	11
US Billboard 200	31

== Certifications ==
Region	Certification	Certified units/sales
Australia (ARIA)	Platinum	70,000^{^}
United Kingdom (BPI)	Platinum	300,000^{^}
United States (RIAA)	Gold	500,000^{^}
^{^} Shipments figures based on certification alone.
