= Bobby Hatfield =

American singer (1940–2003)

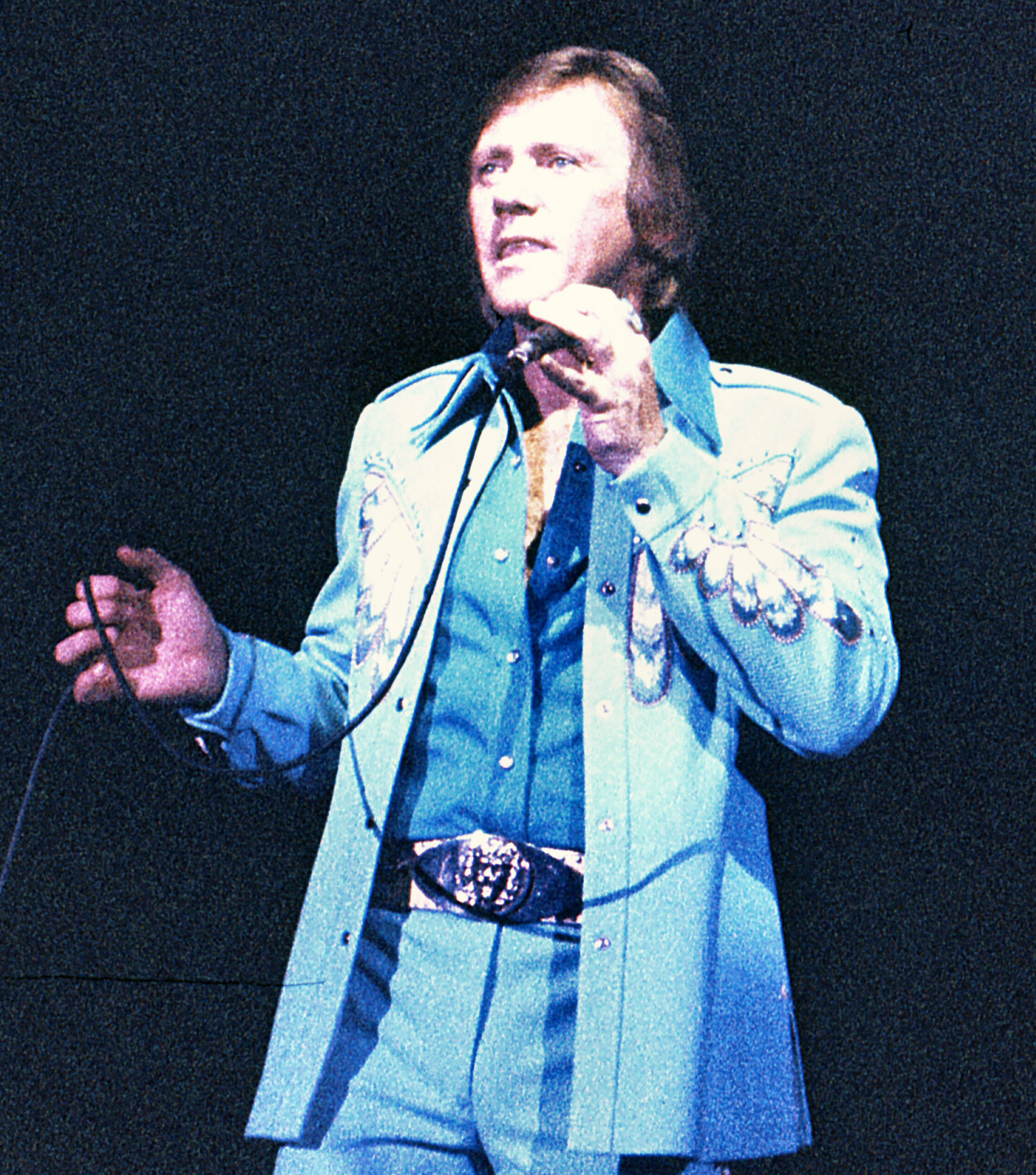

Background information
- Born: Robert Lee Hatfield; August 10, 1940; Beaver Dam, Wisconsin, U.S.
- Died: November 5, 2003 (aged 63) Kalamazoo, Michigan, U.S.
- Genre: Blue-eyed soul
- Occupation: Singer-songwriter
- Instrument: Vocals
- Years active: 1961–2003
- Formerly of: The Righteous Brothers; Bill Medley

Robert Lee Hatfield (August 10, 1940 – November 5, 2003) was an American singer. He and Bill Medley performed together as the Righteous Brothers. He sang the tenor part for the duo and sang solo on the group's 1965 recording of "Unchained Melody".

== Early life ==
Born in Beaver Dam, Wisconsin, Hatfield moved with his family to Anaheim, California, when he was four. He attended Anaheim High School, where he played football and baseball and was co-captain of the basketball team. He was student body president in the 1957–1958 school year, graduating in 1958.

=== Baseball ===
Hatfield was scouted by the Los Angeles Dodgers. He briefly considered signing as a professional ballplayer, but his passion for music led him to pursue a singing career while still attending high school. He attended Fullerton College.

He eventually encountered his singing partner, Bill Medley, while attending California State University, Long Beach. Hatfield was an alumnus of Sigma Alpha Epsilon fraternity.

== Career ==
Bobby Hatfield initially was in a group from Anaheim called the Variations.

=== Paramours: 1962–1963 ===
In 1962, Hatfield joined with Medley, who was in a group called the Paramours, and formed a five-member group using the same name: Paramours. They first performed at a club called John's Black Derby in Santa Ana. They were signed to a small record label Moonglow in 1962. They released a single "There She Goes (She's Walking Away)" in December 1962. However, the Paramours did not have much success and soon broke up, leaving Hatfield and Medley to perform as a duo in 1963.

=== The Righteous Brothers: 1963–1968 ===
Later, Hatfield and Medley performed as a duo and named their singing act The Righteous Brothers. They were often told they sounded like African-American gospel singers and chose the name after Black Marines remarked of their singing, "that's righteous, brothers" and called them "righteous brothers". Their first charted single as the Righteous Brothers was "Little Latin Lupe Lu" released under the label Moonglow Records, and they appeared regularly on the television show Shindig!

In 1964, they appeared in a show at the Cow Palace near San Francisco and met the music producer Phil Spector, whose group The Ronettes was also in the show. Spector was impressed and signed them to his own label Philles Records. Their first No. 1 was "You've Lost That Lovin' Feelin'," produced by Phil Spector in 1964. Follow-up hits included "Unchained Melody," which was actually a Hatfield solo performance. After the success of "Unchained Melody", Spector then started recording older standards with the Righteous Brothers such as "Ebb Tide", which Hatfield also performed solo, and it reached the Top 5. Both "Unchained Melody" and "Ebb Tide" were songs he had performed with his first group, the Variations. Another two of the last songs the duo recorded with Philles Records, "The White Cliffs of Dover" and "For Sentimental Reasons", were performed solo by Hatfield.

In 1966, the Righteous Brothers left Spector and signed with Verve/MGM Records, and had a hit with "(You're My) Soul and Inspiration". However the duo broke up in 1968, and Hatfield teamed with singer Jimmy Walker (from The Knickerbockers) using the Righteous Brothers name on the MGM label. The new partnership released an album but did not have much success.

=== Solo career ===
Hatfield recorded a number of singles as a solo artist. In 1963, Hatfield released an uncharted single, "Hot Tamales"/"I Need a Girl" on Moonglow Records. He released the self-penned "Hang Ups" and covers of older songs, but "Only You" was his only charted single, peaking at No. 95. In 1969, Hatfield also appeared in the ABC Movie of the Week titled The Ballad of Andy Crocker.

In 1971, he released a solo album, Messin' in Muscle Shoals, recorded at the FAME Studios in Muscle Shoals in August 1970. However, MGM was in financial trouble, a scheduled single "The Promised Land"/"Woman You Got No Soul" was not released, and with little promotion the album largely went unnoticed.

=== Reunion ===
Hatfield and Medley reunited in 1974, and had another hit, the No. 3 "Rock and Roll Heaven." A hiatus followed between 1976 and 1981 when Medley retired from music after his ex-wife died, but they reunited for an anniversary special on American Bandstand in 1981 to perform an updated version of "Rock and Roll Heaven".

In 1990, after the success of the film Ghost in which "Unchained Melody" was used, Hatfield re-recorded the song and remarked to friends that he had not lost any of the high notes in his tenor range since the original recording, but had actually gained one note. The duo then toured extensively all through the 1990s and early 2000s.

The Righteous Brothers were inducted into the Rock and Roll Hall of Fame in March 2003 by Billy Joel.

== Personal life ==
Hatfield had a short marriage to Joy Ciro, who appeared as a dancer on the T.A.M.I. Show and Where the Action Is. They had two children, Bobby, Jr. and Kalin.

Hatfield married Linda Torrison on August 4, 1979, and they remained married until his death. Linda suffered from lupus, and Hatfield set up an annual golf tournament, the Bobby Hatfield Charity Golf Classic, to raise funds for charities for the disease. The couple had two children, Vallyn and Dustin.

== Death ==
Hatfield died at the Radisson Hotel in downtown Kalamazoo, Michigan, on November 5, 2003. He was found by Bill Medley and the Righteous Brothers' road manager Dusty Hanvey. A security guard let them into Hatfield's room after he had failed to show up at the concert venue when expected. He apparently died in his sleep, hours before a scheduled Righteous Brothers concert. In January 2004, a toxicology report concluded that cocaine use had precipitated a fatal heart attack. The initial autopsy found that Hatfield had advanced coronary disease. The medical examiner stated that "in this case, there was already a significant amount of blockage in the coronary arteries."

== Discography ==
This is Hatfield's discography as a solo artist. See The Righteous Brothers for his discography as part of the duo.

=== Albums ===
Title	Album details	Track listing
Messin' In Muscle Shoals	Released: 1971; Label: MGM Records; Format: Vinyl, CD	1. "You Left the Water Running" – 3:00; 2. "Let It Be" – 4:38; 3. "If I Asked You" – 2:32; 4. "The Promised Land" – 2:57; 5. "Shuckin' and Jivin'" – 2:22; 6. "I Saw a Lark" – 3:21; 7. "You Get a Lot to Like" – 2:50; 8. "Show Me the Sunshine" – 3:54; 9. "The Feeling Is Right" – 2:25; 10. "Messin' in Muscle Shoals" – 2:35

=== Singles ===
Year	Title	Chart positions	
Year	Title	US	CAN
1963	"Hot Tamales"	—	—
1968	"Hang Ups"	—	—
1968	"Brothers"	—	—
1969	"Only You (And You Alone)"	95	89
1969	"My Prayer"	—	—
1969	"Answer Me"	—	—
1972	"Oo Wee Baby I Love You"	—	—
1972	"Stay With Me"	—	—

Film soundtracks

- Zig Zag (Original Motion Picture Score) (MGM, 1970)
