= (You're My) Soul and Inspiration =

- US picture sleeve

Single by the Righteous Brothers

from the album Soul and Inspiration
- B-side: "B-Side Blues"
- Released: February 26, 1966
- Recorded: Late 1965
- Genre: Pop, blue-eyed soul
- Length: 3:21
- Label: Verve
- Songwriters: Barry Mann, Cynthia Weil
- Producer: Bill Medley

The Righteous Brothers singles chronology
"The White Cliffs of Dover" (1966)	"(You're My) Soul and Inspiration" (1966)	"He" (1966)

"(You're My) Soul and Inspiration" is a song by the American pop duo the Righteous Brothers. It was the group's first hit after leaving their long-time producer Phil Spector. The song was written by Barry Mann and Cynthia Weil; the duo also wrote the group's first hit "You've Lost That Lovin' Feelin'" along with Phil Spector. It is the title track of their album. The single peaked at No. 1 on the US Billboard Hot 100, and reached No. 15 on the UK Singles Chart. Billboard ranked the record as the No. 3 single for 1966.

== Background ==
The song was written by Barry Mann and Cynthia Weil, part of the Brill Building pop machine in New York City. They first began writing it following the success of the Righteous Brothers' first single with Phil Spector, "You've Lost That Lovin' Feelin'", which they also wrote. However, the song was not completed, as they thought it sounded too much like "Lovin' Feelin", and Spector chose instead to record Carole King and Gerry Goffin's "Just Once in My Life" as the duo's second single.

After leaving Spector's Philles Records in late 1965, the Righteous Brothers moved to the mostly jazz-oriented Verve label. Bill Medley of the Righteous Brothers then asked Mann about the incomplete "Soul and Inspiration" that the songwriters had played for Medley when they first started writing it, and asked them to complete the song. Mann and Weil complied, and the Righteous Brothers then recorded the finished song in late 1965.

The song was arranged by Jack Nitzsche, who had arranged many of Phil Spector's records, and Medley produced the song in a style like the sound of the group's early hits with Spector. Medley was able to imitate Spector's "Wall of Sound" technique with reverbing pop-orchestration and a soaring female backup choir. Some of the session musicians from the Wrecking Crew, such as keyboard player Don Randi, pianist Michel Rubini and bassist Jimmy Bond, were hired for the recording. Other musicians on this record included Art Munson on guitar, Michael Patterson on piano, Drew Johnson on drums, Bill Baker (who also arranged the song) on sax, Dick Shearer on trombone, and Bill King, Sanford Skinner and Bob Faust on trumpets. It used a string section as well, and there is a spoken section by Bobby Hatfield in the bridge.

The song was released on February 26, 1966, and reached No. 1 on the Billboard Hot 100; it stayed at the top for three weeks. This was, however, the end of the duo's peak in popularity. Although they entered the charts with their next single, the religiously-oriented "He" (No. 18 US), before briefly splitting in 1968, they did not crack the top 10 again until reuniting in 1974 with "Rock and Roll Heaven", an ode to deceased musicians.

== Cover versions ==
In 1969, the Blossoms covered the tune with Righteous Brothers member Bill Medley producing.

In 1973, Doc Severinsen recorded an instrumental version of this song on his Trumpets & Crumpets & Things album.

In 1974, The 5th Dimension covered the song for their Soul & Inspiration album.

In 1978, Donny and Marie Osmond went to No. 38 on the Billboard Hot 100 and number 18 Easy Listening with their version.

In 1990, the Oak Ridge Boys covered the song for the soundtrack of My Heroes Have Always Been Cowboys. This version peaked at #31 on the Billboard Hot Country Singles & Tracks charts.

Bill Medley himself covered the song in 1994 as a duet with Darlene Love.

== Charts and certifications ==
=== Weekly charts ===
Chart (1966)	Peak position
Canada Top Singles (RPM)	2
New Zealand (Listener)	18
UK Singles (Official Charts)	15
US Billboard Hot 100	1
US Cashbox	1

=== Certifications ===
Region	Certification	Certified units/sales
United States (RIAA)	Gold	1,000,000^{^}
^{^} Shipments figures based on certification alone.
