= Sunset Sound Recorders =

Recording studio in Hollywood, California, US

Coordinates: 34.09797°N 118.334973°W

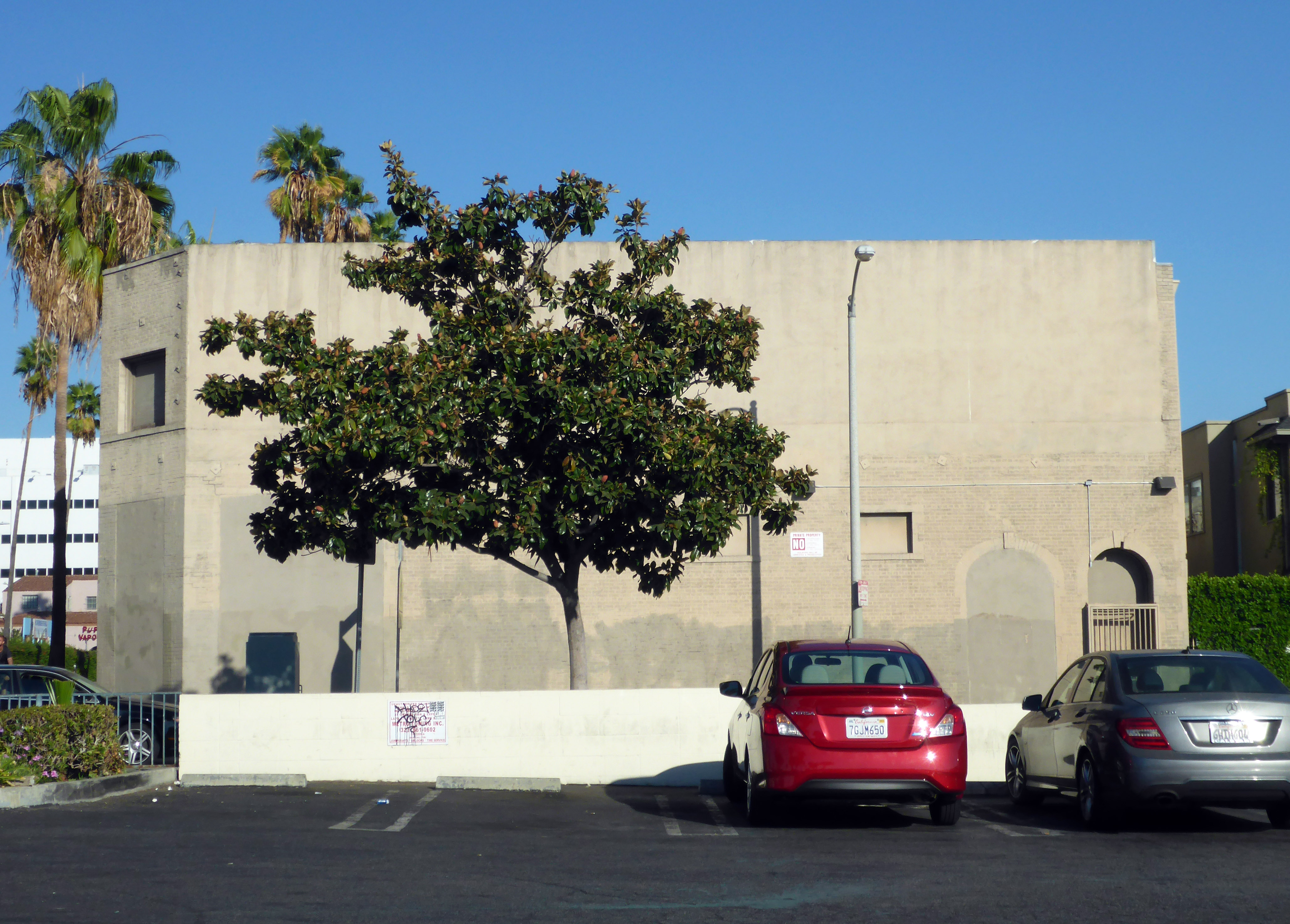
- Sunset Sound Recorders in Hollywood, circa 2014
- Industry: Recording studio
- Founded: 1958
- Headquarters: Los Angeles, California, United States
- Website: Official website

Sunset Sound Recorders is a recording studio in Hollywood, California, United States, located at 6650 West Sunset Boulevard.

== Background ==
The Sunset Sound Recorders complex was created by Walt Disney's Director of Recording, Tutti Camarata, from a collection of old commercial and residential buildings. At the encouragement of Disney himself, Camarata began the project in 1958, starting with a former automotive repair garage whose sloping floor would tend to reduce unwanted sonic standing wave reflections. Soon, the audio for many of Disney's films was being recorded at the studio, including Bedknobs and Broomsticks, Mary Poppins, and 101 Dalmatians

Over 200 Gold records have been recorded at Sunset Sound, including hit albums for Elton John, Led Zeppelin, Van Halen, Toto, parts of Prince's Purple Rain, the Rolling Stones' Exile on Main St., Neil Young's After the Gold Rush, the Beach Boys' Pet Sounds, Linda Ronstadt's Don't Cry Now, parts of Guns N' Roses' Chinese Democracy and Janis Joplin's posthumously-released Pearl. In addition, the Doors recorded their first two albums, The Doors and Strange Days, at the studio. Idina Menzel recorded her vocal track for the song "Let It Go" for Disney Animation's 2013 film Frozen at the studio.

In 1981, Sunset Sound Recorders owner Camarata purchased The Sound Factory, another Los Angeles recording studio founded by Moonglow Records and later purchased and developed by David Hassinger.

With many homeless people camped nearby, the studio expressed their frustration with the situation in 2024. The city program, Inside Safe, had the homeless residents accept services and housing in mid-2024.
