= Just Once in My Life (album) =

1965 album by the Righteous Brothers

Studio album by the Righteous Brothers
- Released: June 1965
- Length: 33:38
- Label: Philles
- Producer: Phil Spector; Bill Medley

The Righteous Brothers chronology
You've Lost that Lovin' Feelin (1965)	Just Once in My Life (1965)	Back to Back (1965)

Singles from Just Once in My Life
- 1. "Just Once in My Life" Released: April 1965

Just Once in My Life is a studio album by the American music duo the Righteous Brothers, released in June 1965 by Philles Records. According to Bill Medley, he was allowed to produce most of the tracks in the album, including "Unchained Melody" which was originally intended only as an album track because co-producer Phil Spector was interested only in producing singles. The album reached No. 9 on Billboard 200 in the United States.

== Singles ==
The title track "Just Once in My Life" was the first single released from the album, and it reached No. 9 on the singles chart in May 1965. The single "Unchained Melody" was initially only intended as a B-side for "Hung on You" from the next album Back to Back, but it became popular and it was then released as an A side, reaching at No. 4 in the United States and No. 14 in the United Kingdom in 1965. It was later included in the soundtrack of 1990 blockbuster film Ghost and the re-released single reached No. 1 in the UK in 1990.

== Track listing ==
Side one
No.	Title	Writer(s)	Length
1.	"Just Once in My Life"	Gerry Goffin; Carole King; Phil Spector	3:55
2.	"Big Boy Pete"	Dewey Terry; Don Harris	3:03
3.	"Unchained Melody"	Alex North; Hy Zaret	3:34
4.	"You Are My Sunshine"	Charles Mitchell; Jimmie Davis	3:04
5.	"The Great Pretender"	Buck Ram	2:33
6.	"Sticks And Stones"	Titus Turner	1:54

Side two
No.	Title	Writer(s)	Length
1.	"See That Girl"	Barry Mann; Cynthia Weil	3:09
2.	"Oo-Poo-Pah-Do"	Jessie Hill	3:51
3.	"You'll Never Walk Alone"	Rodgers and Hammerstein	2:15
4.	"Guess Who?"	Jesse Belvin	2:30
5.	"The Blues"	Bill Medley	2:50

== Charts ==
Chart (1965)	Peak position
US Top R&B/Hip-Hop Albums (Billboard)	8
US Billboard 200	9
