= In Loving Memory (compilation album) =

Compilation album by Diana Ross & the Supremes, The Temptations, Marvin Gaye
- Released: September 1968
- Genre: Gospel
- Label: Motown

In Loving Memory is a gospel compilation released by Motown Records in September 1968. It is dedicated to the memory of Motown founder Berry Gordy's sister, Mrs. Loucye S. Gordy Wakefield, and features several popular Motown acts, including Diana Ross & the Supremes, The Temptations, The Miracles and Marvin Gaye, performing versions of popular gospel songs and spirituals.

Loucye Gordy Wakefield was the sister of the founder of Motown Record's Berry Gordy Jr. based in the early days in Detroit. There was a scholarship fund set up in her memory. Loucye was vice-president of Motown Record Corporation, she headed Billings & Collections, and Jobete Publishing. The original recording of In Loving Memory is a tribute to Louyce as an expression of love from Motown stars in songs who paid tribute at her funeral on July 29, 1965.

Commercially, an album, In Loving Memory was released 9/68 on Motown MT 642 in the US, also an EP on subsidiary label Chisa 60642 with 4 tracks from the album, and in the US, and in 1969 in the UK on TML 11124.

There were also annual Sterling Balls where scholarships were presented; October 4, 1969 at Gordy Manor with entertainment from Marvin Gaye, with a non-commercial album with same tracks as the 1968 commercially released album but was not given a Motown release number.

In 1971 Motown produced Motown M 739 a Souvenir Album Sterling Ball Benefit, this was not released commercially but was given to attendees of the 1971 Sterling Ball given again at Gordy Manor.

Both Sterling Ball albums were in silver card covers.

== Track listing ==
1. "Just a Closer Walk with Thee" – Gladys Knight & the Pips
2. "His Eye Is on the Sparrow" – Marvin Gaye
3. "He" – Diana Ross & the Supremes
4. "The Lord's Prayer" – The Temptations
5. "Were You There" – Martha Reeves & the Vandellas
6. "Swing Low, Sweet Chariot" – Stevie Wonder
7. "How Great Thou Art" – Gladys Knight & the Pips
8. "Nobody Knows the Trouble I've Seen" – Four Tops
9. "Rock of Ages" – Smokey Robinson & the Miracles
10. "Steal Away" – Voices of Tabernacle
11. "Never Grow Old" – Voices of Tabernacle
12. "What Do You Choose" – Harvey Fuqua
