= Unchained Melody =

1955 song by Alex North and Hy Zaret

Song by Todd Duncan
- Released: January 19, 1955
- Composer: Alex North
- Lyricist: Hy Zaret

"Unchained Melody" is a 1955 song by Alex North with lyrics by Hy Zaret. North composed the music as a theme for Unchained (1955), a prison film. The version of the song in the film's soundtrack was sung by Todd Duncan. It has since become a standard and one of the most recorded songs of the 20th century, with the version recorded by the Righteous Brothers in 1965 notable in its own right. According to the song's publishing administrator, over 1,500 recordings of "Unchained Melody" have been made by more than 670 singers, in multiple languages.

In 1955, three versions of the song – by Les Baxter, Al Hibbler, and Roy Hamilton – charted in the top 10 of the Billboard Hot 100 in the United States. In the United Kingdom, the versions by Hibbler, Baxter, Jimmy Young, and Liberace ranked in the top 20 simultaneously, a record for any song. The song continued to chart in the 21st century, and until 2014 it was the only song to reach number one with four different recordings in the United Kingdom.

Of the hundreds of recordings made, the Righteous Brothers' version, with a solo by Bobby Hatfield, became the jukebox standard after its release. Hatfield changed the melody in the final verse and many subsequent covers of the song are based on his version. The Righteous Brothers' recording acquired renewed attention when it was featured in the 1990 film Ghost. In 2004, it was number 27 on AFI's 100 Years...100 Songs survey of top tunes in American cinema.

== Origin of song ==
In 1954, Alex North was contracted to compose the score for the prison film Unchained (released in 1955). North had a melody he had written in the 1930s and composed and recorded the score when he was asked to write a song based upon the movie's theme. North asked Hy Zaret to write the lyrics. After first refusing, Zaret and North together wrote "Unchained Melody". The song eventually became known as the "Unchained Melody", though the song does not actually include the word "unchained"; Zaret had refused the producer's request to include the word "unchained" in his lyrics. Instead, Zaret chose to focus on someone who pines for a lover he has not seen in a "long, lonely time". The film centered on a man who contemplates either escaping from prison to live life on the run or completing his sentence and returning to his wife and family. The song has an unusual harmonic device as the bridge ends on the tonic chord rather than the more usual dominant chord. "Unchained Melody" is written in the key of C major.

Todd Duncan sang the vocals for the film soundtrack and performs an abbreviated version in the film. Playing one of the prisoners, he sings it, accompanied by another prisoner on guitar, while other prisoners listen sadly. With Duncan singing the vocals, the song was nominated in 1956 for 1955's Oscars, but the Best Song award went to the hit song "Love Is a Many-Splendored Thing".

William Stirrat, an electrical engineer, claimed to have written the lyrics as a teenager in 1936 under the pen name "Hy Zaret", only to have North use the uncredited words in the 1955 original. The case went to court and the dispute was resolved completely in favor of the real Zaret (the one born Hyman Zaritsky), who continued to receive all royalties.

== Early versions ==
"Unchained Melody", Al Hibbler (Decca 9-29441, 1955)

Following the movie, several charting covers were released in 1955. Bandleader Les Baxter released a choral version (Capitol Records catalog number 3055), which reached number one on the US charts and number 10 in the UK. The words "unchain me" are sung repeatedly at the beginning and the lyrics are sung by a choir. Billboard ranked this version as the number-five song of 1955. Al Hibbler followed close behind with a vocal version (Decca Records catalog number 29441), that reached number three on the Billboard charts and number two in the UK chart listings. Jimmy Young's release (on Decca Records UK catalog number F10502) stayed at number one on the British charts for three weeks and remained on the UK charts for 19 weeks. Young re-recorded the song in early 1964 and it hit number 43 in the UK. Two weeks after Young's version entered the top 10 of the British charts in June 1955, Liberace scored a number-20 hit (Philips PB 430). Roy Hamilton's version (Epic Records catalog number 9102) reached number one on the R&B Best Sellers list and number six on the pop chart. June Valli recorded the song on March 15, 1955 (RCA Victor Records as catalog number 20-6078) with the flip side "Tomorrow", and took it to number 29 on the Top Pop Records list. Harry Belafonte recorded the song, and sang his version at the 1956 Academy Awards after it was nominated for the Academy Award for Best Original Song of 1955.

While the sheet-music business was losing its prominence to sound recordings, a sheet music release of the song peaked at number one on its 10th week on the Billboard Best Selling Sheet Music chart on the week ending June 18, 1955. It stayed at its peak position for nine weeks until it dropped to number four on its 20th week on the week ending August 27.

=== Charts ===
==== Les Baxter ====
Chart (1955)	Peak position
Australia (AMR)	1
UK Singles (Official Charts)	10
UK (Record Mirror)	10
US (Billboard Best Seller in Stores)	2
US (Billboard Most Played by Jockeys)	1

==== Roy Hamilton ====
Chart (1955)	Peak position
US (Billboard Most Played by Jockeys)	6
US (Billboard R&B Best Sellers in Stores)	1

==== Jimmy Young ====
Chart (1955)	Peak position
UK Singles (Official Charts)	1
UK (Record Mirror)	2

==== Al Hibbler ====
Chart (1955)	Peak position
Australia (AMR)	1
UK Singles (Official Charts)	2
UK (Record Mirror)	1
US (Billboard Most Played by Jockeys)	3
US (Billboard R&B Best Sellers in Stores)	1

== The Righteous Brothers versions ==
"Unchained Melody"
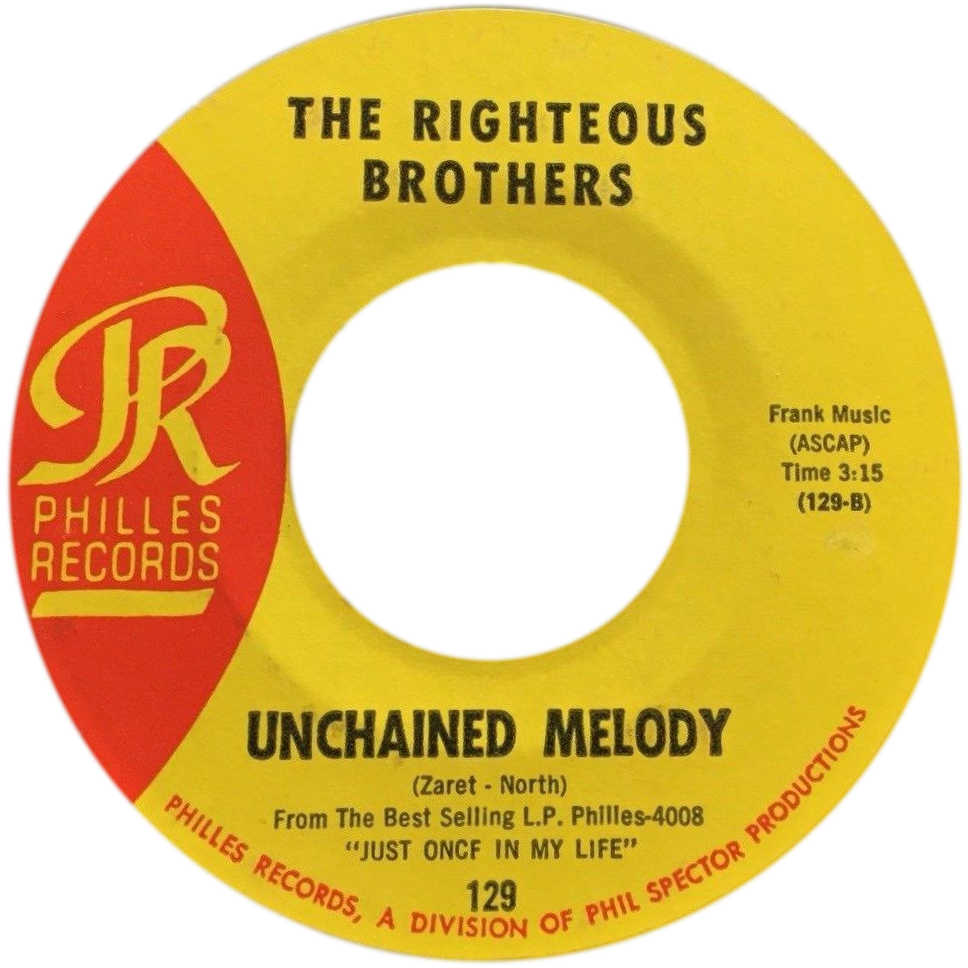

Single by the Righteous Brothers

from the album Just Once in My Life
- A-side: "Hung on You"
- Released: July 17, 1965
- Recorded: March 2, 1965
- Studio: Radio, Hollywood
- Genre: Blue-eyed soul
- Length: 3:36
- Label: Philles
- Composer: Alex North
- Lyricist: Hy Zaret
- Producers: Uncredited (original pressings); Phil Spector (later pressings, Back to Mono (1958-1969)); Bill Medley (uncredited)

The Righteous Brothers singles chronology
"Just Once in My Life" (1964)	"Hung on You" / "Unchained Melody" (1965)	"Ebb Tide" (1965)

Alternative release
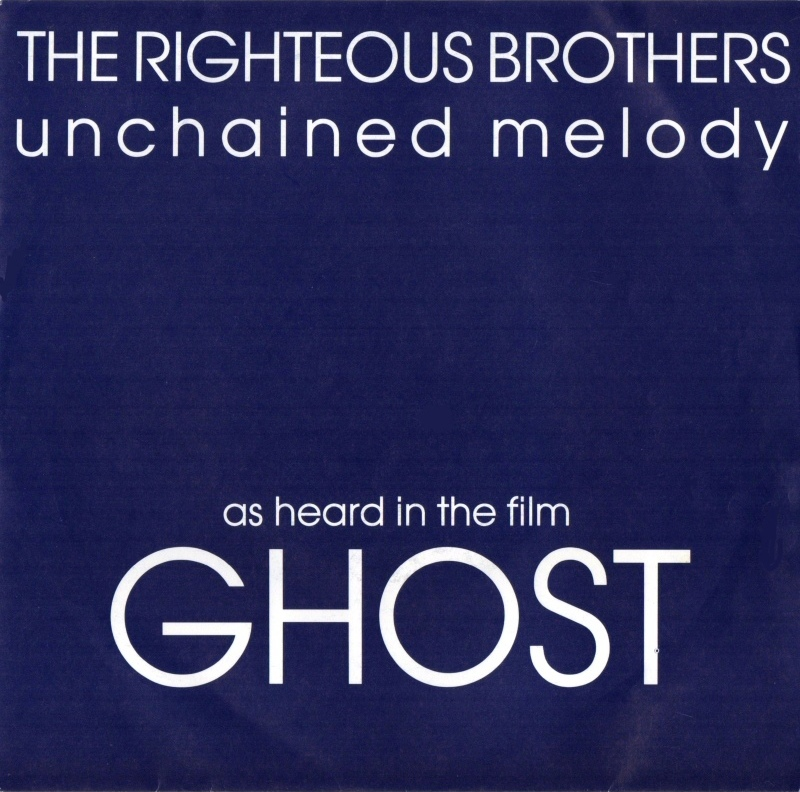
- 1990 UK vinyl re-release of the original 1965 recording

Audio
- "Unchained Melody" on YouTube
- "Unchained Melody" (1990 version) on YouTube

The best-known version of "Unchained Melody" was recorded by the duo the Righteous Brothers for Philles Records in 1965. The lead vocal was performed solo by Bobby Hatfield, who later recorded other versions of the song credited solely to him. According to his singing partner Bill Medley, they had agreed to do one solo piece each per album. Both wanted to sing "Unchained Melody" for their fourth album, but Hatfield won the coin toss.

=== Recording ===
"Unchained Melody"
Bobby Hatfield changed the tune to the line "I need your love" for the climax of the song, a change found in most subsequent versions

The song was not originally intended to be released as an A side. As Spector was not especially interested in producing B-sides or album tracks, he left the production to Bill Medley, who had produced the duo before they signed with Spector and Philles. He brought in a similar "wall of sound" instrumental track. Medley said: "Phil came to me and asked me to produce the Righteous Brothers albums because he would have taken too long and it would have cost too much money." By Medley's account, Spector only claimed production credit after it supplanted "Hung on You" as the hit. Early copies of the single did not credit a producer for "Unchained Melody" and only credited Spector as producer of the original single "Hung on You". Later pressings of the single credited Spector as the producer, as do album liner notes in the Spector box set Back to Mono (1958–1969).

Hatfield made a change to the song during the recording sessions. The first two takes of the song, he performed it in the same style as Roy Hamilton. For a third take, he decided to change the melody for the "I need your love" line in the final verse, and sang it much higher, instead. After this recording, Hatfield said he could do another take better, to which Medley replied: "No, you can't." Medley played the Wurlitzer piano on the song; later, he noted, "if I knew that it was gonna be a hit I certainly would have brought in a better piano player."

=== Release ===
"Unchained Melody" was originally released as the B-side of the single "Hung on You" as the follow-up single to "Just Once in My Life". However, "Hung on You" failed to interest radio DJs, who instead chose to play the B-side, "Unchained Melody". According to Medley, producer Phil Spector, who would deliberately place a throwaway song that was not meant to be played on the B-side, was so incensed by DJs choosing to play the B-side that he started to call their radio stations to get them to stop playing "Unchained Melody". He failed, though, and the song reached number four on the Billboard Hot 100 chart and number 14 in the UK in 1965.

=== Re-recording and re-release ===
"Unchained Melody" reappeared on the US Billboard charts in 1990 after the Righteous Brothers' recording was used in the box-office blockbuster film Ghost. Two versions charted in the US that year – the original and a new recording. According to Medley, he was interested in having the original recording released due to the renewed interest in the song, but was told that licensing issues existed. Although Hatfield's voice was no longer as good as when he first recorded the song, they decided to re-record it for Curb Records. The re-recorded version was released as both a cassette single and a CD single. It received minimal airplay, but sold well, peaking at number 19. The re-recorded version was certified platinum by the RIAA on January 10, 1991, and received a Grammy Award nomination.

The 1965 original Righteous Brothers recording was reissued on October 15, 1990, by the oldies-reissue label Verve Forecast under licensing from Polygram Records (which had acquired the rights years earlier). The original version received significant airplay, and topped the U.S. adult contemporary chart for two weeks in 1990, but sales for this version were minimal in the US since it was available as only a 45 rpm single and the song peaked at number 13 based largely on airplay. For eight weeks, both versions were on the Billboard Hot 100 simultaneously and the Righteous Brothers became the first act to have two versions of the same song in the top 20 at the same time. This re-released song reached number one in the UK, where it stayed for four weeks, becoming the UK's top-selling single of 1990. As of 2017, it had sold 1.17 million copies in the UK. The 1990 reissue also reached number one in Australia, Austria, Ireland, the Netherlands, and New Zealand.

Due to the success of their re-recording, the Righteous Brothers also re-recorded other songs and released them as part of a budget-priced CD compilation by Curb Records. For the original recordings, Polydor had licensed the CD rights to Rhino Records for a premium-priced 1989 compilation of Righteous Brothers hits from various labels; later in 1990, it issued its own regular-priced Righteous Brothers greatest-hits album that included the recording.

=== Reception ===
The Righteous Brothers' cover of "Unchained Melody" is now widely considered the definitive version of the song. Hatfield's vocal in the original recording in particular is highly praised; it has been described as "powerful, full of romantic hunger, yet ethereal," and a "vocal tour de force", although his later re-recording was noted as "fudging only a bit on the highest notes". The production of their original recording has been described as "epic", and that with "Hatfield's emotion-packed tenor soaring to stratospheric heights, it's a record designed to reduce anyone separated from the one they loved to a "pile of mush".

=== Charts ===
==== Weekly charts ====
Chart (1965)	Peak position
Belgium (Ultratop 50 Flanders)	10
Belgium (Ultratop 50 Wallonia)	17
Canada Top Singles (RPM)	9
Netherlands (Dutch Top 40)	9
Netherlands (Single Top 100)	8
New Zealand (Lever Hit Parade)	4
UK Singles (Official Charts)	14
US Billboard Hot 100	4
US Cash Box Top 100	5
US Cash Box Top 50 R&B	9

Chart (1990–1991)	Peak position
Australia (ARIA)	1
Austria (Ö3 Austria Top 40)	1
Belgium (Ultratop 50 Flanders)	3
Canada Top Singles (RPM)	4
Canada Adult Contemporary (RPM)	1
Europe (Eurochart Hot 100)	4
Europe (European Hit Radio)	19
Finland (Suomen virallinen lista)	24
France (SNEP)	6
Germany (GfK)	6
Ireland (IRMA)	1
Luxembourg (Radio Luxembourg)	1
Netherlands (Dutch Top 40)	1
Netherlands (Single Top 100)	1
New Zealand (Recorded Music NZ)	1
Switzerland (Schweizer Hitparade)	4
UK Singles (Official Charts)	1
US Billboard Hot 100	13
US Adult Contemporary (Billboard)	1
US Cash Box Top 100	9

==== Year-end charts ====
Chart (1965)	Position
Belgium (Ultratop 50 Flanders)	61
Netherlands (Dutch Top 40)	54
US Billboard Hot 100	21

Chart (1990)	Position
Australia (ARIA)	8
Canada Top Singles (RPM)	48
Canada Adult Contemporary (RPM)	34
Netherlands (Dutch Top 40)	59
Netherlands (Single Top 100)	29
UK Singles (OCC)	1
US Adult Contemporary (Billboard)	28

Chart (1991)	Position
Australia (ARIA)	45
Austria (Ö3 Austria Top 40)	4
Belgium (Ultratop 50 Flanders)	59
Europe (Eurochart Hot 100)	17
Germany (Media Control)	47
New Zealand (RIANZ)	2
Switzerland (Schweizer Hitparade)	29

==== Decade-end charts ====
Chart (1990–1999)	Rank
Austria (Ö3 Austria Top 40)	81

=== Certifications ===
Region	Certification	Certified units/sales
Australia (ARIA)	Platinum	70,000^{^}
Austria (IFPI Austria)	Gold	25,000^{*}
Italy (FIMI)	Gold	50,000^{‡}
Japan (RIAJ)	Platinum	100,000^{^}
New Zealand (RMNZ)	2× Platinum	60,000^{‡}
Spain (Promusicae)	Gold	25,000^{^}
United Kingdom (BPI)	Platinum	1,167,000
United States (RIAA)	Platinum	1,000,000^{^}
^{*} Sales figures based on certification alone.^{^} Shipments figures based on certification alone.^{‡} Sales+streaming figures based on certification alone.

== Elvis Presley version ==
"Unchained Melody"

Single by Elvis Presley
- B-side: "Softly, As I Leave You"
- Released: March 1978
- Recorded: June 21, 1977
- Venue: Rushmore Civic Center in Rapid City, South Dakota
- Label: RCA
- Composer: Alex North
- Lyricist: Hy Zaret
- Producer: Felton Jarvis

Elvis Presley singles chronology
"My Way" (1977)	"Unchained Melody" (1978)	"(Let Me Be Your) Teddy Bear" (1978)

On June 21, 1977, Elvis Presley performed the song at a show in Rapid City, South Dakota. The performance, described by Rolling Stone as "the last great moment of his career", was recorded for his last television special two months before his death in August 1977. A single, based on this recording, was released in March 1978 by RCA Records with "Softly, As I Leave You" as the B side. The song reached number six in the country charts of both the US and Canada, and was certified gold by Music Canada on July 10, 1986.

Another live version recorded earlier on April 24, 1977, at Crisler Arena in Ann Arbor, Michigan, was included in his last album Moody Blue. Both versions had studio overdubs with additional instruments added before they were released.

=== Charts ===
Chart (1977)	Peak position
Canada Country Singles (RPM)	6
US Hot Country Songs (Billboard)	6
US Cash Box Top 100 Country	7

=== Certifications ===
Region	Certification	Certified units/sales
Canada (Music Canada)	Gold	50,000^{^}
^{^} Shipments figures based on certification alone.

== Robson and Jerome version ==
"Unchained Melody"

Single by Robson & Jerome

from the album Robson & Jerome
- Released: May 8, 1995
- Recorded: 1995
- Length: 3:17
- Label: BMG
- Composer: Alex North
- Lyricist: Hy Zaret
- Producers: Mike Stock, Matt Aitken

Robson & Jerome singles chronology
"Unchained Melody" / "White Cliffs of Dover" (1995)	"I Believe" / "Up on the Roof" (1995)

The version by Robson and Jerome is notable as the best-selling single of 1995 in the UK. It also launched the singing career of Robson and Jerome, and became the biggest hit in the UK for Simon Cowell, marking his beginning as a significant figure in the music industry.

In November 1994, in an episode of the UK television drama series Soldier Soldier, characters Dave Tucker and Paddy Garvey, portrayed by actors Robson Green and Jerome Flynn, respectively, performed "Unchained Melody" as an impromptu duo, the Unrighteous Brothers, after the entertainment failed to appear for a friend's wedding. Their performance triggered a strong response from the audience, who attempted to find a recording of the song that was then unavailable. Simon Cowell was alerted to the interest shown by the public, and pursued the two reluctant actors for the next four months to record the song, to the extent that Robson Green threatened legal action to stop Cowell harassing them. The actors were eventually persuaded to sign a recording contract after Cowell made further attempts via Green's mother, and record a Righteous Brothers-type version of the song as a duo.

The recording was produced by Mike Stock and Matt Aitken. Stock later revealed that the vocals were "assisted" and parts of the song were sung by other session singers. It was released as a double-A-sided single with "White Cliffs of Dover", a popular song during World War II, included in recognition of the 50th anniversary of VE Day, the date of the single's release. The video released for "Unchained Melody" also incorporated clips from the 1945 film Brief Encounter.

Their recording immediately reached number one in the UK, selling 314,000 copies in its first week, at that time the fastest-selling debut single in UK chart history. It stayed at the top of the chart for seven weeks. It became the best-selling single of 1995, and one of the country's all-time biggest-selling singles (number 9 in November 2012), with 1.87 million copies sold. The self-titled album they released later in the year also became the best-selling album of 1995. Although the duo decided to quit the following year, they eventually sold 7 million copies of albums and 5 million copies of the three singles released. Simon Cowell, who before this was known largely as a creator of novelty records with television characters such as the puppets Zig and Zag and action characters Power Rangers, then came to the attention of the media for his ability to create hit records.

=== Charts ===
==== Weekly charts ====
Chart (1995)	Peak position
Europe (Eurochart Hot 100)	5
Ireland (IRMA)	2
Scottish Singles Sales (Official Charts)	1
UK Singles (Official Charts)	1

==== Year-end charts ====
Chart (1995)	Position
Europe (Eurochart Hot 100)	60
UK Singles (OCC)	1

=== Certifications ===
Region	Certification	Certified units/sales
United Kingdom (BPI)	2× Platinum	1,872,000

== Gareth Gates version ==
"Unchained Melody"

Single by Gareth Gates

from the album What My Heart Wants to Say
- Released: 18 March 2002
- Recorded: 2002
- Studio: A-side (Stockholm, Sweden)
- Genre: Pop
- Length: 3:54
- Label: RCA, 19, S
- Composer: Alex North
- Lyricist: Hy Zaret
- Producer: Steve Mac

Gareth Gates singles chronology
"Unchained Melody" (2002)	"Anyone of Us (Stupid Mistake)" (2002)

English singer-songwriter Gareth Gates first performed "Unchained Melody" as a contestant in the quarter-finals of the first series of the UK singing competition television show Pop Idol, which included Simon Cowell as one of the judges. Gates reprised the song in the final as his personal choice, but the competition was won by Will Young. Gates was signed by Cowell, and as the runner-up, Gates released the song as his first single three weeks after the winner had released his single, the double-A-sided "Anything Is Possible" / "Evergreen". Gates' cover of "Unchained Melody" was released together with his versions of the same two songs released by Young, which Gates had also performed in the final.

Gates' version of "Unchained Melody" became one of the fastest-selling singles in the UK, selling around 328,000 copies in the first day of release. It reached number one on the UK Singles Chart in its first week of release with sales of 850,000 copies, and stayed at the top of the chart for four weeks. It became the second-best-selling song in the UK in 2002, as well as that of the decade of the 2000s, after the single by the winner Will Young. It had sold 1.35 million copies in the UK as of 2017.

=== Charts ===
==== Weekly charts ====
Chart (2002–2003)	Peak position
Australia (ARIA)	9
Belgium (Ultratop 50 Flanders)	15
Belgium (Ultratop 50 Wallonia)	6
Europe (Eurochart Hot 100)	12
France (SNEP)	4
Germany (GfK)	17
Hungary (Editors' Choice Top 40)	40
Ireland (IRMA)	1
Netherlands (Dutch Top 40)	25
Netherlands (Single Top 100)	12
Romania (Romanian Top 100)	22
Scottish Singles Sales (Official Charts)	1
Switzerland (Schweizer Hitparade)	18
UK Singles (Official Charts)	1

==== Year-end charts ====
Chart (2002)	Position
Ireland (IRMA)	12
UK Singles (OCC)	2

Chart (2003)	Position
Australia (ARIA)	72
Belgium (Ultratop 50 Flanders)	84
Belgium (Ultratop 50 Wallonia)	28
France (SNEP)	68
Switzerland (Schweizer Hitparade)	91

==== Decade-end charts ====
Chart (2000–2009)	Position
UK Singles (OCC)	2

=== Certifications ===
Region	Certification	Certified units/sales
Australia (ARIA)	Gold	35,000^{^}
Belgium (BRMA)	Gold	25,000^{*}
United Kingdom (BPI)	2× Platinum	1,348,000
^{*} Sales figures based on certification alone.^{^} Shipments figures based on certification alone.

=== Release history ===
Region	Date	Format(s)	Label(s)	Ref.
United Kingdom	March 18, 2002	CD; cassette	RCA; 19; S	
Australia	July 21, 2003	CD	RCA; 19; S	

== Other notable versions ==
- Spike Milligan and Peter Sellers of the Goons recorded a parody of the song, produced by George Martin, on June 29, 1955. It would have been the first single by the Goons, but EMI refused to release it, fearing a lawsuit from its music publisher. It prompted Spike Milligan to move to Decca Records, which released other works from the Goons. The Goons later released an album titled Unchained Melodies with Decca, but without the actual song. The single was later released in 1990, and the song was then included in the 2007 compilation album titled Unchained Melodies – The Complete Recordings 1955-1978.
- In 1963, an uptempo doo-wop version by Vito and the Salutations peaked at number 66 on the Billboard Hot 100; this version was used in the soundtrack for Goodfellas in 1990.
- David Garrick released a version which reached number 14 in the Netherlands in 1968.
- In 1975, Clem Curtis had a disco version that spent three weeks in the Record Mirror UK Disco Chart, peaking at number 75.
- In 1981, a live version performed by the band Heart, with lead vocals by Ann Wilson, peaked at number 83 on the Billboard Hot 100.
- In 1986, Leo Sayer released a version of the song with a contemporary reworking of the "wall of sound" production technique that included an unusual electric guitar solo near the climax. The single charted in the UK at number 54.
- U2 covered the song as a B side to their 1989 single, "All I Want Is You", and included in their compilation album The Best of 1980–1990. They have performed the song live many times, including one captured on their 1993 concert film Zoo TV: Live from Sydney. Bono and The Edge also performed the song together with "One" for the charity 46664 Concert in tribute to Nelson Mandela held in Cape Town in 2003.
- Cyndi Lauper was nominated for a 2005 Grammy award for "Best Instrumental Composition Accompanying a Vocal" for her interpretation of the song, which appears on her 2003 studio album At Last.
- In 2006, singer Barry Manilow covered the song on his album The Greatest Songs of the Fifties and it was released as a single. The song reached number 20 on the Adult Contemporary chart.
- In July 2025, Elliot James Reay delivered what has been described as a "superbly controlled rendition" of Unchained Melody during his All This to Say I Love You Tour in the UK. In October 2025, Interscope/EMI released "Unchained Melody (Live)", a cover of the song that was recorded during Reay's performance in the Benchmark International Arena in Tampa, Florida in September 2025.

=== Country charts ===
Different versions of the song have made the US Hot Country Songs charts.

- Joe Stampley (number 41, 1975)
- Ronnie McDowell (number 26, 1991)
- LeAnn Rimes (number three, 1997) LeAnn Rimes's cover was originally released in September 1996 as a B-side track to "One Way Ticket (Because I Can)" and again in November 1996 on the promotional single, "Put a Little Holiday in Your Heart", that was only available at Target stores with the purchase of her debut album, Blue. It was released as a single to radio on December 17, 1996, and included on the album Unchained Melody: The Early Years (1997). The song reached number three on the Hot Country Songs chart in the US, and number three in the RPM Country Tracks chart in Canada. It was ranked number 64 on the 1997 Year End Country Songs chart in the US, and number 49 in Canada's Year End Country Tracks chart.

== Impact ==
=== Popularity ===
"Unchained Melody" was the only song to have reached number one in the UK in four different recordings on the official chart until it was joined by the charity single "Do They Know It's Christmas?" in its fourth re-recording in 2014. It is the only song to have sold over a million by three separate acts in the UK – Robson and Jerome (1.87 million), Gareth Gates (1.35 million), the Righteous Brothers (1.17 million). The song has been number one on lists of love songs featured on the United Kingdom's Channel 4 and Five.

The song has been covered by many artists; according to the song's publishing administrator, over 1,500 recordings of "Unchained Melody" have been made by more than 670 artists in multiple languages. Its popularity also meant that the song is one of the highest-grossing songs for its copyright holders, estimated in 2012 to be the fifth-biggest earners of royalties according to the BBC's list of the Richest Songs in the World at £18 million.

=== Accolades ===
The song was nominated in 1956 for 1955's Oscar for best original song from the film Unchained. The re-recorded version by the Righteous Brothers was nominated for a Grammy Award in 1991 in the best pop performance by a duo or group category, and their original version was inducted into the Grammy Hall of Fame in 2000. The use of the Righteous Brothers' cover of "Unchained Melody" in the film Ghost resurrected the song's popularity as it was recognized as the "most played" song of 1992 by the American Society of Composers, Authors, and Publishers (ASCAP). ASCAP also announced it to be one of the 25 most-performed songs and musical works of the 20th century in 1999, and the most-performed love song of the 1950s in 2003.

In 2001, the song was ranked at number 138 in the list of Songs of the Century released by the Recording Industry Association of America and the National Endowment for the Arts. In 2004, Rolling Stone placed the Righteous Brothers version of the song at number 365 on its list of the 500 Greatest Songs of All Time. It was placed first in Magic 1278's 500 greatest songs of all time. It was also listed in 2004 at number 27 in the list of the 100 top movie songs of all time in American Film institute's centenary AFI's 100 Years...100 Songs survey of songs in American cinema. In 2007, the Songwriters Hall of Fame honored "Unchained Melody" with a Towering Song award that is presented to creators of a song "that has influenced the culture in a unique way over many years."
