= The Righteous Brothers =

American singing duo

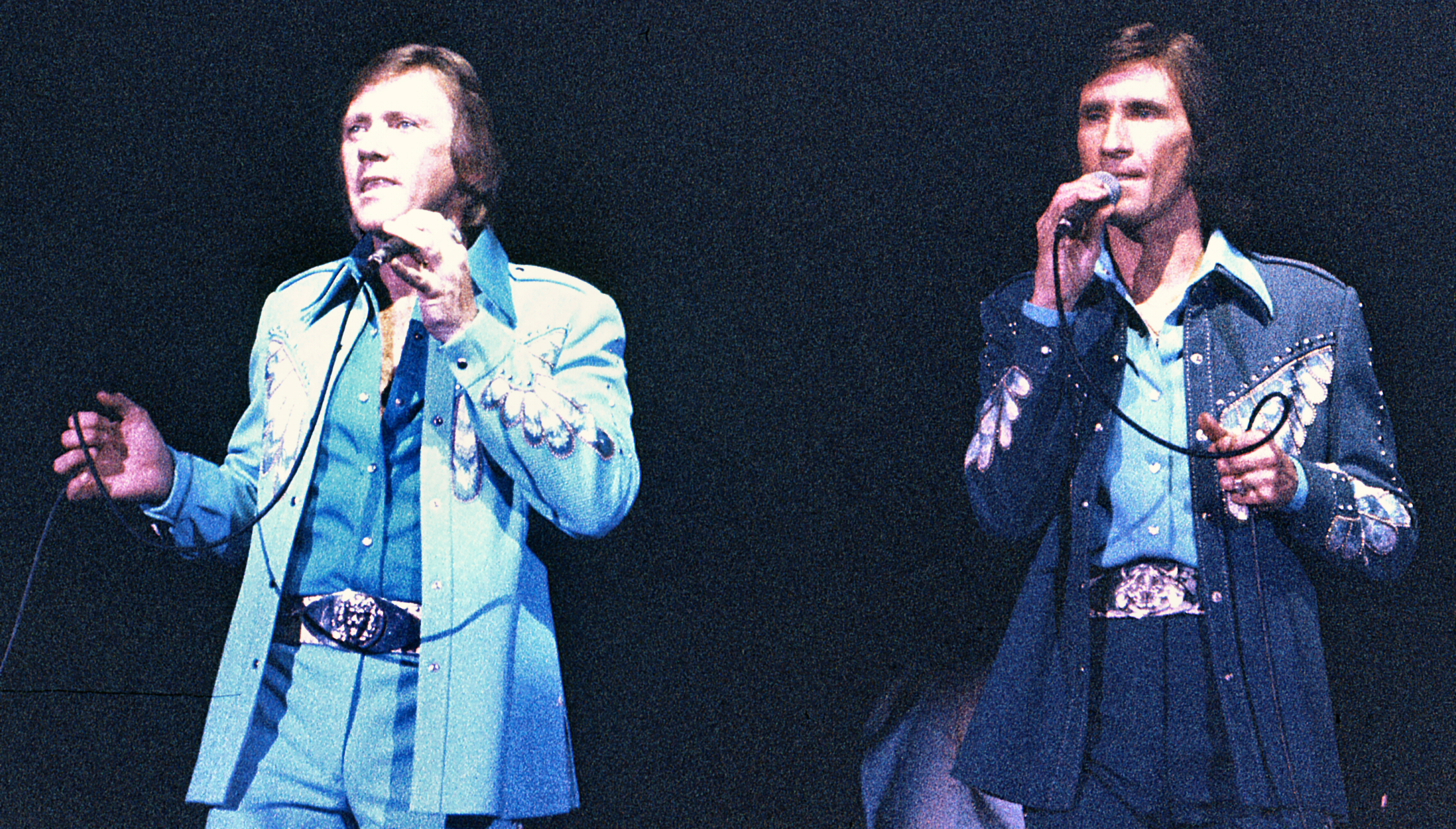
- Bobby Hatfield (left) and Bill Medley performing at Knott's Berry Farm in the 1970s

Background information
- Origin: Orange County, California, U.S.
- Genres: Pop, soul, rock
- Years active: 1963–1971, 1974–1976, 1981–2003, 2016–present
- Labels: Moonglow; Philles; Verve; Haven; Rhino (for reissues only); Curb
- Spinoff of: The Paramours
- Members: Bill Medley; Bucky Heard
- Past members: Bobby Hatfield; Jimmy Walker

The Righteous Brothers are an American musical duo originally formed by Bill Medley and Bobby Hatfield but now comprising Medley and Bucky Heard. Medley formed the group with Hatfield in 1963. They had first performed together in 1962 in the Los Angeles area as part of a five-member group called the Paramours, and adopted the name the Righteous Brothers when they became a duo. Their most active recording period was in the 1960s and '70s, and, after several years inactive as a duo, Hatfield and Medley reunited in 1981 and continued to perform until Hatfield's death in 2003. The term "blue-eyed soul" is thought to have been coined by Philadelphia radio DJ Georgie Woods in 1964 when describing the duo's music.

Hatfield and Medley had contrasting vocal ranges, which helped them create a distinctive sound as a duet. They each had the vocal talent to perform as soloists. Medley sang the low parts with his bass-baritone voice, with Hatfield taking the higher-register vocals with his tenor. His voice reached the register of a countertenor.

Following a year and a half of Top 40 non-entries on Billboard's Hot 100, the duo hit big with the late-1964 release of what would become their signature record, "You've Lost That Lovin' Feelin'" – a transatlantic number one produced by Phil Spector, often considered one of his finest works and a landmark recording in popular music. Other notable hits include three US 1965 Top Tens – "Just Once in My Life" and covers of "Unchained Melody" (also a huge hit in 1990 after being featured in the film Ghost) and "Ebb Tide" – and the massive US 1966 number one "(You're My) Soul and Inspiration", plus the 1974 comeback hit "Rock and Roll Heaven". Both Hatfield and Medley also had for a time their own solo careers. In 2016, Medley re-formed The Righteous Brothers with Bucky Heard and they continue to perform as a duo.

The Righteous Brothers were inducted into the Rock and Roll Hall of Fame in 2003 and into the Vocal Group Hall of Fame in 2005. Rolling Stone ranked them no. 16 on its list of the 20 Greatest Duos of All Time.

== Music career ==
=== 1962–1964: Beginning ===
Bobby Hatfield and Bill Medley were in different groups before they met – Hatfield was in a group from Anaheim, California called the Variations, and Medley in a group from Santa Ana called the Paramours. Barry Rillera, a member of Medley's band who was also in Hatfield's group, suggested they go see each other's show and perform together. Later, after a member of Paramours left in 1962, Hatfield and Medley joined forces and formed a new Paramours, which included Johnny Wimber (a founder of the Vineyard Movement). They started performing at a club called John's Black Derby in Santa Ana, and were signed to a small record label Moonglow in 1962. They released a single "There She Goes (She's Walking Away)" in December 1962. However, the Paramours did not have much success and soon broke up, leaving Hatfield and Medley to perform as a duo in 1963. According to Medley, they then adopted the name the Righteous Brothers for the duo because black Marines from the El Toro Marine base started calling them "righteous brothers". At the end of a performance, a black U.S. Marine in the audience shouted, "That was righteous, brothers!", and greeted them with "Hey righteous brothers, how you doin'?" on meeting them.

The Righteous Brothers released three albums under the Moonglow label, one of these and a further compilation album were released after they had joined Phil Spector. They released 12 singles with Moonglow, but only two were moderate hits – "Little Latin Lupe Lu" and "My Babe" from their first album Right Now!. In August and September 1964, they opened for The Beatles in their first U.S. tour. However, they left before the tour finished when they were asked to appear on a new television show called Shindig!; they also felt unappreciated by the audience as they were then little known on the East Coast, and the audience demanded to hear the Beatles while they were performing. They returned to Los Angeles to tape the pilot for the show, and would later appear in the show regularly. Their next album was Some Blue-Eyed Soul; the term blue-eyed soul was first used to refer to the Righteous Brothers by black DJs, but after they became popular, the term became a general term for all white singers who sang what was then considered "black music". In October and November 1964, they opened for the Rolling Stones on their American tour.

=== 1964–1965: The Spector years ===
In 1964, music producer Phil Spector came across the Righteous Brothers when they performed in a show at the Cow Palace in Daly City, where one of Spector's acts, the Ronettes, was also appearing, and he conducted the band for the show. Spector was impressed enough to arrange a deal with Moonglow in early October 1964 allowing him to record and release songs by the Righteous Brothers in the US, Canada and UK under his own label, Philles Records. Prior to this, all the songs Spector produced for Philles Records featured African-American singers; the Righteous Brothers would be his first white vocal group for the label. However, their "blue-eyed soul" vocal style suited Spector.

Spector commissioned Barry Mann and Cynthia Weil to write a song for them, which turned out to be "You've Lost That Lovin' Feelin'". The song, released in late 1964, became their first major hit single and reached No. 1 in February 1965. Produced by Phil Spector, the record is often cited as one of the finest expressions of Spector's Wall of Sound production techniques. It is one of the most successful pop singles of its time, despite exceeding the then-standard length for radio play. According to BMI, "You've Lost That Lovin' Feelin'" became the most-played song on American radio and television of the 20th century, with more than eight million airplays by the end of 1999.

The Righteous Brothers had several other hit singles with Philles Records in 1965, including "Just Once in My Life" and "Unchained Melody" (originally the B-side of "Hung on You"), both reaching the Billboard Top 10. Medley said that he produced "Unchained Melody"; the song was originally intended only as a track on the album Just Once in My Life, and Spector had asked him to produce the albums so Spector could spend time and money on producing singles. Later copies of the original 45 release credited Spector as producer when it became a hit.

After the success of "Unchained Melody", Spector started releasing older songs with the Righteous Brothers, including "Ebb Tide", which reached No. 5. Hatfield was the only vocal on "Unchained Melody" and "Ebb Tide", and both were songs Bobby Hatfield had performed with his first group, the Variations. According to Medley, both the early singles "You've Lost That Lovin' Feelin'" and "Just Once in My Life" featured Medley's vocal strongly, which caused some friction between the duo, and the Hatfield solos in later singles restored some balance between the two. The last single released that they recorded with Philles Records was "The White Cliffs of Dover". Although Spector focused his attention in producing singles, a number of albums by the Righteous Brothers released with Philles Records sold well.

In 1965, they had a couple of guest appearances in the films A Swingin' Summer and Beach Ball. They also became the first rock and roll act to play the Strip in Las Vegas (at The Sands).

=== 1966–1967: Verve Records ===
The duo's relationship with Spector however ended in some acrimony; in 1966 they signed with Verve/MGM Records, leading to a lawsuit from Spector, which MGM settled with a $600,000 payment to Spector. Their next release in 1966, "(You're My) Soul and Inspiration" was a Phil Spector sound-alike song. The song was first written by Mann and Weil after the success of "Lovin' Feelin'" but not completed, and they finished the song following a request by Medley after the Righteous Brothers moved to Verve. Medley then produced the completed song, and was able to fully simulate the Spector style of production and achieve a similar sound to that of "Lovin' Feelin'". It quickly became their second No. 1 U.S. hit, staying at the top for three weeks.

After a few more top-40 hits, including "He" and "Go Ahead And Cry", their popularity began to decline. Even a collaboration with former Motown A&R chief William "Mickey" Stevenson failed to work. In 1967, before they went their separate ways, and, to capitalize on their previous hits, Verve/MGM issued a "Greatest Hits" compilation which has been modified twice: in 1983 with 10 tracks and in 1990 with two more tracks.

=== 1968–1975: Break up and reunion ===
The duo split up in February 1968, a breakup that would last for more than six years, when Medley left to pursue a solo career. Medley recorded a few solo recordings on several labels, while Hatfield teamed up with singer Jimmy Walker (from the Knickerbockers) using the Righteous Brothers name on the MGM label. Medley first recorded "I Can't Make It Alone" written by Carole King, but the song failed to make much of an impact. The following single, "Brown Eyed Woman" written by Mann and Weil, performed better. However, neither he nor Hatfield was able to match their previous chart success.

Hatfield and Jimmy Walker recorded an album, Re-Birth, as The Righteous Brothers before disbanding in 1971. In a 2013 interview, Jimmy Walker said he had wanted to continue, but Hatfield decided to take a break and broke up the act. In 1969, Hatfield appeared in a TV movie, The Ballad of Andy Crocker, and also recorded "Only You". He released a solo album, Messin' In Muscle Shoals in 1971.

According to Medley, he was performing three shows a night in Las Vegas, but found it too much of a strain on his voice singing solo. Under advice, he sought out Hatfield to reform the Righteous Brothers; Hatfield at this point was broke and living alone in a small apartment. In 1974, Medley and Hatfield announced their reunion at an appearance on The Sonny & Cher Comedy Hour. They signed with Haven Records, run by producers Dennis Lambert and Brian Potter and distributed by Capitol Records. Within a few weeks of reforming, they recorded Alan O'Day's "Rock and Roll Heaven", a paean to several deceased rock singers which became a hit, peaking at No. 3 on the Billboard Hot 100. Several more minor hits on Haven followed. After 1975, however, the Righteous Brothers would not appear in music charts except for re-releases of older songs and compilation albums, some of which were re-recordings of earlier works.

=== 1976–2003: Later career and solo works ===
Between 1976 and 1981, Hatfield and Medley stopped performing as a duo after the death of Medley's first wife, as he wanted time off to look after his son. They reunited for an anniversary special on American Bandstand in 1981 to perform an updated version of "Rock and Roll Heaven". They resumed touring intermittently, and they recorded a 21st Anniversary Celebration concert in 1983 at the Roxy on the Sunset Strip in Los Angeles, which was later released on video and was also aired on television.

In the late 1970s, Medley once again began to record as a solo artist and had some success in the 1980s. In 1984, he scored country hits with "Till Your Memory's Gone" and "I Still Do", the latter also an adult-contemporary crossover hit. In late 1987, his duet with Jennifer Warnes, "(I've Had) The Time of My Life", which appeared on the soundtrack for Dirty Dancing, topped the Billboard Hot 100. It won them a Grammy Award for Best Pop Performance by a Duo or Group with Vocals.

In 1990, Bobby Hatfield's original recording of "Unchained Melody" was featured in the popular feature film Ghost, starring Patrick Swayze and Demi Moore. It triggered an avalanche of requests to Top 40 radio stations by fans who had seen the movie to play the 1965 Righteous Brothers' recording. This motivated Polygram (which now owned the Verve/MGM label archives) to re-release the song to Top 40 radio. It became a major hit for a second time, reaching No. 13 on the Hot 100 in 1990. It also became their second No. 1 in the UK. The duo quickly re-recorded another version of "Unchained Melody" for Curb Records. Both the reissued and the re-recorded songs charted at the same time for several weeks, and the Righteous Brothers made history as the first act to have two versions of the same song in the Top 20 at the same time. The re-recorded "Unchained Melody" hit No. 19 on the Hot 100 and was certified platinum by the Recording Industry Association of America (RIAA).

They also re-recorded other songs for a budget-priced CD, The Best of The Righteous Brothers, released by Curb Records. Medley would later describe the re-recordings as "artistically, a stupid idea; financially, a wonderful idea". The album sold very well and received a double platinum certification from the RIAA. A greatest hits CD collection of the original recordings called The Very Best of the Righteous Brothers: Unchained Melody was released later by Verve/Polydor. This compilation album also became their first entry in the UK album chart. They began to tour extensively all through the 1990s and early 2000s and performed for about 12 weeks a year in Las Vegas.

== Hatfield's death ==
Bobby Hatfield was found dead in his hotel room in Kalamazoo, Michigan, on November 5, 2003, shortly before he was due to perform at a concert with Bill Medley at Western Michigan University's Miller Auditorium. The autopsy report attributed his death to heart failure brought on by cocaine. Bill Medley continued to perform as a solo artist for some time after Hatfield's death, occasionally singing with a screen projection of old film footage of Hatfield.

== 2016: The Righteous Brothers revived ==
In January 2016, Medley announced he intended to revive the Righteous Brothers for the first time since 2003. The late Hatfield was replaced with singer Bucky Heard at Las Vegas's Harrah's Showroom for more than 40 shows from March 23, 2016, to November 8. The repertoire included some of the Righteous Brothers' best-known songs, such as "You've Lost That Lovin' Feelin'", "Soul & Inspiration", "Unchained Melody", but also the later "Rock and Roll Heaven", as well as Bill Medley's "The Time of My Life". Medley explained that it was the encouragement of the Righteous Brothers' fans as well as several friends, producers and contacts in Las Vegas that made him consider reviving the Righteous Brothers' name again, while acknowledging that it was a difficult choice to continue without Hatfield, saying "I've had a million fans hollering at me to keep the Righteous Brothers alive... I looked at a couple of guys, but you know, you can't replace Bobby Hatfield, he's the best in the world". Medley was previously acquainted with Heard and watched him perform at a tribute concert to Journey, after which he realized that Heard was the only one he would consider capable of filling Hatfield's shoes, also noting that he and Heard had good chemistry together. Medley approached Heard a few days later and discussed the matter, which ended in a coin toss, which Medley won, resulting in Heard accepting Medley's proposal. Heard has since communicated that he knows he can never replace Hatfield, nor will he attempt to do so and that he intends to sing like Hatfield rather than sound like him. A new CD was released the same year, featuring several of the Righteous Brothers' hit singles sung by Medley and Heard.

In early 2024, after six decades of touring, Bill Medley announced his forthcoming retirement from the road with the Righteous Brothers; Lovin' Feelin' Farewell Tour. The tour commenced in January 2024, running throughout the year and into early 2025.

In 2025, Medley released a solo album, Straight from the Heart.

== Awards and nominations ==
The Righteous Brothers were nominated twice for a Grammy. In 1965, their recording of "You've Lost That Lovin' Feelin" was nominated in the Best Rock And Roll Recording category at the 7th Annual Grammy Awards. Their re-recording of "Unchained Melody" was nominated for Best Pop Vocal Performance by a Duo or Group at the 1991 Grammy. They were also awarded the Best New Singing Group in the Billboard Disc Jockey Poll in 1965.

The Righteous Brothers were inducted into the Rock and Roll Hall of Fame on March 10, 2003, the Vocal Group Hall of Fame in 2005, and the National Rhythm & Blues Hall of Fame in 2019.

== Members ==
Current members

- Bill Medley (1963–1968, 1974–1976, 1981–2003, 2016–present)
- Bucky Heard (2016–present)

Former members

- Bobby Hatfield (1963–1971, 1974–1976, 1981–2003; died 2003)
- Jimmy Walker (1968–1971; died 2020)

== Discography ==
For their discography as solo artists, see Bill Medley and Bobby Hatfield.

=== Albums ===
Title	Album details	Peak chart positions				Certifications
Title	Album details	US	US R&B	AUS	CAN	Certifications
Right Now!	Released: 1963; Label: Moonglow Records; Formats: Vinyl	11	8	—	—	
Some Blue-Eyed Soul	Released: 1964; Label: Moonglow Records; Formats: Vinyl	14	—	—	—	
This Is New!	Released: 1965; Label: Moonglow Records; Formats: Vinyl	39	—	—	—	
You've Lost That Lovin' Feelin'	Released: 1965; Label: Philles Records; Formats: Vinyl	4	3	—	—	
Just Once in My Life...	Released: 1965; Label: Philles Records; Formats: Vinyl	9	8	—	—	
Back to Back	Released: 1965; Label: Philles Records; Formats: Vinyl	16	—	—	—	
Soul & Inspiration	Released: 1966; Label: Verve Records; Formats: Vinyl	7	18	—	—	US: Gold
Go Ahead and Cry	Released: 1966; Label: Verve Records; Formats: Vinyl	32	—	—	—	
Sayin' Somethin'	Released: 1967; Label: Verve Records; Formats: Vinyl	155	—	—	—	
Souled Out	Released: 1967; Label: Verve Records; Formats: Vinyl	198	—	—	—	
Standards	Released: 1967; Label: Verve Records; Formats: Vinyl	—	—	—	—	
One for the Road	Released: 1968; Label: Verve Records; Formats: Vinyl	187	—	—	—	
Re-Birth (Bobby Hatfield and Jimmy Walker)	Released: 1969; Label: Verve Records; Formats: Vinyl	—	—	—	—	
Give It to the People	Released: 1974; Label: Haven Records; Formats: Vinyl	27	—	83	27	
Sons of Mrs. Righteous	Released: 1975; Label: Haven Records; Formats: Vinyl	—	—	—	—	
The Righteous Brothers (Bill Medley and Bucky Heard)	Released: 2016; Label: Rock Canyon Records; Formats: Digital, CD	—	—	—	—	
"—" denotes releases that did not chart or were not released to that country

=== Compilation albums ===
Many compilation albums by The Righteous Brothers have been released; the following is a selection of compilation albums that received certifications.

Title	Album details	Peak chart positions						Certifications
Title	Album details	US	US Catalog	AUS	UK	CAN	NLD	Certifications
The Righteous Brothers Greatest Hits	Released: November 30, 1967 (also reissued later on CD with more tracks); Label: Verve Records; Formats: Vinyl, CD	21	—	—	—	10	58	Can: Gold; US: Gold
Greatest Hits Vol. 2	Released: 1969; Label: Verve Records; Formats: Vinyl, cassette, CD, digital download	126	—	—	—	—	—	
You've Lost That Lovin' Feelin'	Released: 1982 (AUS); Label: J&B Records (JB 098); Formats: Vinyl, cassette	—	—	40	—	—	—	
Soul & Inspiration	Released: 1987 (AUS); Label: J&B Records (JB 323); Formats: Vinyl, cassette	—	—	98	—	—	—	
The Anthology 1962–1974	Released: July 26, 1989; Label: Rhino Records; Formats: Vinyl, cassette, CD, digital download	178	—	—	—	—	—	US: Gold
Unchained Melody – Best of Righteous Brothers	Released: October 2, 1990; Label: Curb Records; Formats: Cassette, CD, digital download	161	1	5	—	—	—	AUS: Platinum; CAN: Platinum; US: 2× Platinum
The Very Best of the Righteous Brothers: Unchained Melody	Released: 1990; Label: Polydor (Verve); Formats: Vinyl, Cassette, CD, digital download	31	14	38	11	—	—	AUS: Platinum; UK: Platinum; US: Gold
"—" denotes releases that did not chart or were not released to that country

=== Singles ===
Year	Titles (A-side, B-side) Both sides from same album except where indicated	Peak chart positions				Certifications	Album
Year	Titles (A-side, B-side) Both sides from same album except where indicated	US	UK	CAN	NLD	Certifications	Album
1963	"Little Latin Lupe Lu" b/w "I'm So Lonely"	49	—	—	—		Right Now!
1963	"My Babe"^{[a]} b/w "Fee-Fi-Fidily-I-O"	75	—	—	—		Right Now!
1963	"Koko Joe" b/w "B-Flat Blues"	—	—	—	—		Right Now!
1964	"Try to Find Another Man" b/w "I Still Love You" (from This Is New!)	—	—	—	—		Some Blue-Eyed Soul
1964	"Bring Your Love to Me" b/w "If You're Lying, You'll Be Crying" (from This Is New!)	—	—	—	—		Some Blue-Eyed Soul
1964	"This Little Girl of Mine" b/w "If You're Lying, You'll Be Crying" (from This Is New!)	—	—	—	—		Some Blue-Eyed Soul
1964	"You've Lost That Lovin' Feelin'" b/w "There's a Woman"	1	1	1	8^{[d]}	UK: Silver	You've Lost That Lovin' Feelin'
1965	"Bring Your Love to Me" / "Fannie Mae"^{[b]}	83; 117	—	—	—		Some Blue-Eyed Soul
1965	"Just Once in My Life" b/w "The Blues"	9	—	6	—		Just Once in My Life
1965	"You Can Have Her"^{[b]} b/w "Love or Magic" (from Right Now!)	67	—	17	—		This Is New!
1965	"Justine"^{[b]} b/w "In That Great Gettin' Up Mornin'" (from Right Now!)	85	—	37	—		This Is New!
1965	"Unchained Melody" / "Hung on You" (from Back To Back)	4; 47	14 —	9 —	8 —		Just Once In My Life
1965	"For Your Love" b/w "Gotta Tell You How I Feel" (from This Is New!)	—	—	—	—		Some Blue-Eyed Soul
1965	"Ebb Tide" b/w "(I Love You) For Sentimental Reasons"	5	48	5	—		Back To Back
1966	"Georgia on My Mind"^{[b]} b/w "My Tears Will Go Away" (from Some Blue-Eyed Soul)	62	—	—	—		Right Now!
1966	"(You're My) Soul and Inspiration" b/w "B-Side Blues" (Non-album track)	1	15	2	—	US: Gold	Soul & Inspiration
1966	"He" / "He Will Break Your Heart"	18; 91	— —	17 —	—		Soul & Inspiration
1966	"Bring Your Love to Me" (second reissue) b/w "I Need a Girl" (from This Is New!)	—	—	—	—		Some Blue-Eyed Soul
1966	"Go Ahead and Cry" b/w "Things Didn't Go Your Way"	30	—	27	—		Go Ahead and Cry
1966	"On This Side of Goodbye" b/w "A Man Without a Dream"	47	—	42	—		Sayin' Somethin'
1966	"The White Cliffs of Dover" b/w "She's Mine, All Mine"	—	21	—	—		Back to Back
1966	"Island in the Sun" b/w "What Now My Love"	—	24	—	—		Go Ahead and Cry
1967	"Along Came Jones" b/w "Jimmy's Blues"	—	—	—	—		Sayin' Somethin'
1967	"Melancholy Music Man" b/w "Don't Give Up on Me"	43	—	—	—		Non-album tracks
1967	"Stranded in the Middle of No Place" b/w "Been So Nice"	72; 128	—	—	—		Souled Out
1967	"My Darling Clementine" b/w "That Lucky Old Sun"; Unreleased single	—	—	—	—		Standards
1968	"Here I Am" b/w "So Many Lonely Nights Ahead"	—	—	—	—		Souled Out
1969	"You've Lost That Lovin' Feelin'" b/w "Let the Good Times Roll" (from The Righteous Brothers Greatest Hits, Vol. 2); UK reissue	—	10	—	—		The Righteous Brothers Greatest Hits

Year	Titles (A-side, B-side) Both sides from same album except where indicated	Peak chart positions					Certifications	Album
Year	Titles (A-side, B-side) Both sides from same album except where indicated	US	AUS	UK	CAN	NLD	Certifications	Album
1970	"Woman, Man Needs Ya" b/w "And the Party Goes On"	—	—	—	—	—		Re-Birth
1970	"Po' Folks" b/w "Good N' Nuff"	—	—	—	—	—		Re-Birth
1974	"Rock and Roll Heaven" b/w "I Just Wanna Be Me"	3	25	—	4	—		Give It to The People
1974	"Give It to the People" b/w "Love Is Not a Dirty Word"	20	75	—	27	—		Give It to The People
1974	"Dream On" b/w "Dr. Rock and Roll"	32	97	—	41	—		Give It to The People
1975	"Never Say I Love You" b/w "High Blood Pressure"	—	—	—	—	—		The Sons of Mrs. Righteous
1975	"Substitute" b/w "Young Blood"	—	—	—	—	—		The Sons of Mrs. Righteous
1976	"Hold On (To What You Got)" b/w "Let Me Make the Music"	—	—	—	—	—		Non-album tracks
1977	"You've Lost That Lovin' Feelin'" b/w "Rat Race" (from Soul & Inspiration); UK reissue	—	—	42	—	—		The Righteous Brothers Greatest Hits
1988	"You've Lost That Lovin' Feelin'" b/w "Unchained Melody"; Dutch reissue	—	—	87	—	13		The Very Best of the Righteous Brothers: Unchained Melody
1990	"Unchained Melody"^{[c]} b/w "Hung on You"; Reissue	13	1	1	4	1	AUS: Platinum; UK: Platinum	The Very Best of the Righteous Brothers: Unchained Melody
1990	"Unchained Melody" (new 1990 recording for Curb Records); CD single	19	—	—	—	—	US: Platinum	Best of Righteous Brothers
1990	"You've Lost That Lovin' Feelin'" b/w "Ebb Tide"	—	129	3	—	—		The Very Best of the Righteous Brothers: Unchained Melody
"—" denotes releases that did not chart or were not released to that country

Notes

- Note a "My Babe" re-charted in 1965 at No. 101 U.S.
- Note b "Bring Your Love to Me"/"Fannie Mae", "You Can Have Her", "Justine" and "Georgia on My Mind" were older recordings released as singles in the U.S. by the Moonglow label to cash in on the duo's success on Philles (1964–65) and Verve (1966–67), which explains their relatively low chart positions.
- Note c The 1990 re-issue of "Unchained Melody" also charted at No. 1 on the Billboard Adult Contemporary chart.
- Note d Three versions were ranked together as one in the Dutch Top 40 chart – the versions by the Righteous Brothers, Cilla Black, and a local cover by Trea Dobbs.
