= Give It to the People =

Studio album by the Righteous Brothers
- Released: 1974
- Studios: Sound Labs, Hollywood
- Length: 35:35
- Label: Haven
- Producers: Brian Potter; Dennis Lambert

The Righteous Brothers chronology
Rebirth (1969)	Give It to the People (1974)	Sons of Mrs. Righteous (1975)

Singles from Give It to the People
- 1. "Rock and Roll Heaven" Released: May 1974; 2. "Give It to the People" Released: August 1974; 3. "Dream On" Released: November 1974

Give It to the People is the thirteenth studio album by American duo the Righteous Brothers. It was their first album in five years after disbanding.

== Reception ==
Professional ratings
Review scores
Source	Rating
AllMusic	3/5 stars
The Encyclopedia of Popular Music	2/5 stars

Joe Vigilone of AllMusic stated "Producers Dennis Lambert and Brian Potter put together a thin but effective sound for their string of hits with various artists in this time period, the formula utilized here fitting Glen Campbell well a year later. Despite the three shots of commercial success there was something too Vegas and glitzy about the Give It to the People album, the title track going Top 20 four months after "Rock & Roll Heaven"'s chart penetration."

== Track listing ==
1. "Dr. Rock And Roll"
2. "And I Thought You Loved Me"
3. "Dream On"
4. "You Turn Me Around"
5. "Together Again"
6. "Give It to the People"
7. "I Just Wanna Be Me"
8. "Love Is Not a Dirty Word"
9. "Lines"
10. "Rock and Roll Heaven"

== Personnel ==
Adapted from liner notes.

"Dr. Rock And Roll"

- Bass – Wilton Felder
- Drums – Ed Greene
- Guitar – Larry Carlton, Dean Parks
- Piano – Michael Omartian
- Horns – Chuck Findley, Ernie Watts, Jerome Richardson, Lew McCreary, Paul Hubinon
- Background Vocals – Clydie King, Dennis Lambert, Ginger Blake, Julia Tillman Waters, Maxine Willard Waters, Marti McCall, Sherlie Matthews

"And I Thought You Loved Me"

- Bass – Wilton Felder
- Drums – Ed Greene
- Guitar – Ben Benay, Larry Carlton
- Clavinet – Dennis Lambert
- Piano – Michael Omartian
- Horns – Chuck Findley, Jerome Richardson, Lew McCreary, Paul Hubinon, William Green
- Percussion – Gary Coleman
- Background Vocals – Clydie King, Marti McCall, Sherlie Matthews

"Dream On"

- Bass – Wilton Felder
- Drums – Ed Greene
- Guitar – Dean Parks, Larry Carlton
- Piano – Michael Omartian
- Horns – Chuck Findley, Ernie Watts, Jerome Richardson, Lew McCreary, Paul Hubinon
- Percussion – Brian Potter, Gary Coleman
- Background Vocals – Ginger Blake, Julia Tillman Waters, Maxine Willard Waters

"You Turn Me Around"

- Bass – Wilton Felder
- Drums – Ed Greene
- Guitar – Dean Parks, Larry Carlton
- Piano – Michael Omartian
- Percussion – Gary Coleman

"Together Again"

- Bass – Wilton Felder
- Drums – Ed Greene
- Guitar – Dean Parks, Larry Carlton
- Electric Piano – Michael Omartian
- Horns – Chuck Findley, Ernie Watts, Lew McCreary, Paul Hubinon
- Saxophone – Jerome Richardson
- Percussion – Gary Coleman
- Background Vocals – Clydie King, Marti McCall, Sherlie Matthews

"Give It To The People"

- Bass – Wilton Felder
- Drums – Ed Greene
- Guitar – Ben Benay, Dean Parks
- Clavinet – Dennis Lambert
- Piano – Michael Omartian
- Horns – Chuck Findley, Jerome Richardson, Lew McCreary, Paul Hubinon, William Green
- Percussion – Gary Coleman
- Background Vocals – Clydie King, Marti McCall, Sherlie Matthews

"I Just Wanna Be Me"

- Bass – Scott Edwards
- Drums – Jim Gordon
- Guitar – Ben Benay, Dean Parks
- Piano – Michael Omartian
- Horns – Jackie Kelso, Jerome Richardson, Jim Horn, Lew McCreary, Ollie Mitchell, Paul Hubinon
- Percussion – Gary Coleman
- Background Vocals – Ginger Blake, Julia Tillman Waters, Maxine Willard Waters

"Love Is Not A Dirty Word"

- Bass – Wilton Felder
- Drums – Ed Greene
- Guitar – Dean Parks, Larry Carlton
- Clavinet – Dennis Lambert
- Piano – Michael Omartian
- Horns – Chuck Findley, Ernie Watts, Jerome Richardson, Lew McCreary, Paul Hubinon
- Percussion – Gary Coleman
- Background Vocals – Ginger Blake, Julia Tillman Waters, Maxine Willard Waters

"Lines"

- Bass – Wilton Felder
- Drums – Ed Greene
- Guitar – Ben Benay, Larry Carlton
- Piano – Michael Omartian
- Horns – Chuck Findley, Jerome Richardson, Lew McCreary, Paul Hubinon, William Green
- Percussion – Gary Coleman
- Background Vocals – Dennis Lambert

"Rock And Roll Heaven"

- Bass – Scott Edwards
- Drums – Jim Gordon, Ben Benay
- Guitar – Dean Parks
- Clavinet – Dennis Lambert
- Piano – Michael Omartian
- Horns – Jackie Kelso, Jerome Richardson, Jim Horn, Lew McCreary, Ollie Mitchell, Paul Hubinon
- Percussion – Brian Potter, Gary Coleman
- Background Vocals – Dennis Lambert, Ginger Blake, Julia Tillman Waters, Maxine Willard Waters

== Charts ==
Chart (1974)	Peak position
US Top LPs & Tape (Billboard)	27
Australia (Kent Music Report)	83
Canada (RPM)	27
