= You've Lost That Lovin' Feelin' =

1964 single by the Righteous Brothers

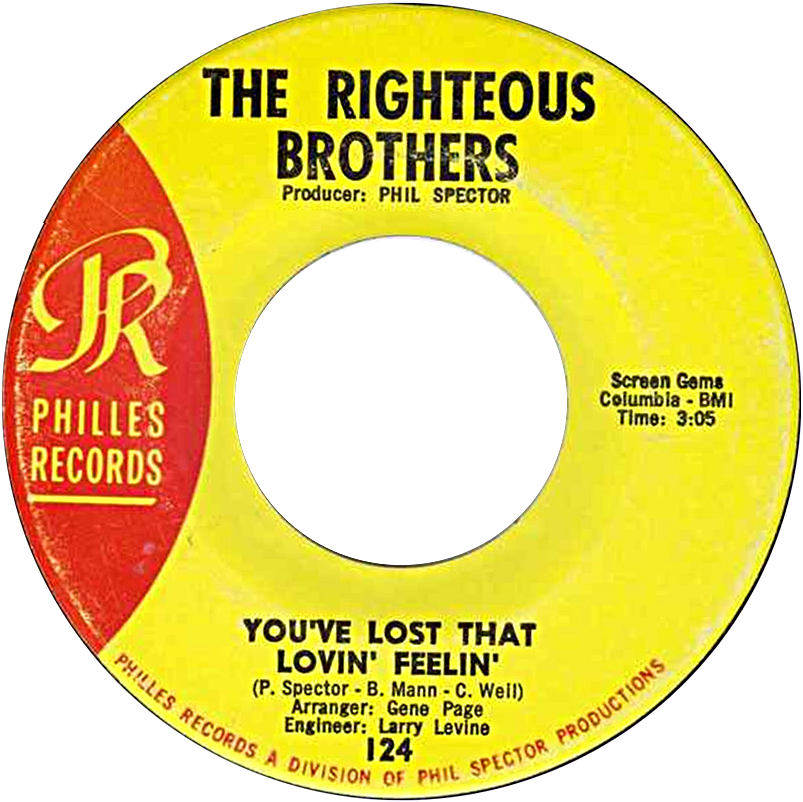
- Side A of the original 1964 US single

Single by the Righteous Brothers

from the album You've Lost That Lovin' Feelin'
- B-side: "There's a Woman"
- Released: November 1964
- Recorded: September 26, 1964
- Studio: Gold Star, Hollywood
- Genre: Pop; R&B; blue-eyed soul
- Length: 3:45
- Label: Philles
- Songwriters: Phil Spector; Barry Mann; Cynthia Weil
- Producer: Phil Spector

The Righteous Brothers singles chronology
"My Babe" (1963)	"You've Lost That Lovin' Feelin'" (1964)	"Bring Your Love to Me" (1965)

Official audio
- "You've Lost That Lovin' Feelin'" on YouTube

"You've Lost That Lovin' Feelin'" is a song by Phil Spector, Barry Mann, and Cynthia Weil, first recorded in 1964 by the American vocal duo the Righteous Brothers and released as the lone single and title track from their 1965 album of the same name. This version, produced by Spector, is cited by some music critics as the ultimate expression and illustration of his Wall of Sound recording technique. The record was a critical and commercial success on its release, reaching number one in early February 1965 in both the United States and the United Kingdom. The single ranked No. 5 in Billboard's year-end Top 100 of 1965 Hot 100 hits – based on combined airplay and sales, and not including three charted weeks in December 1964 – and has entered the UK Top Ten on three occasions.

"You've Lost That Lovin' Feelin'" has been covered successfully by numerous artists. In 1965, Cilla Black's recording reached No. 2 in the UK Singles Chart. Dionne Warwick took her version to No. 16 on the Billboard Hot 100 chart in 1969. A 1971 duet version by singers Roberta Flack and Donny Hathaway peaked at No. 30 on the Billboard R&B singles chart. Long John Baldry charted at No. 2 in Australia with his 1979 remake and a 1980 version by Hall and Oates reached No. 12 on the US Hot 100.

Various music writers have described the Righteous Brothers version as "one of the best records ever made" and "the ultimate pop record". In 1999 the performing-rights organization Broadcast Music, Inc. (BMI) ranked the song as the most-played song on American radio and television in the 20th century, having accumulated more than 8 million airplays by 1999, and nearly 15 million by 2011. It held the distinction of being the most-played song for 22 years until 2019, when it was overtaken by "Every Breath You Take". In 2001 the song was chosen as one of the Songs of the Century by RIAA, and in 2003 the track ranked No. 34 on the list of the 500 Greatest Songs of All Time by Rolling Stone. In 2015, the single was inducted into the National Recording Registry by the Library of Congress for being "culturally, historically, or aesthetically significant".

== Background and composition ==
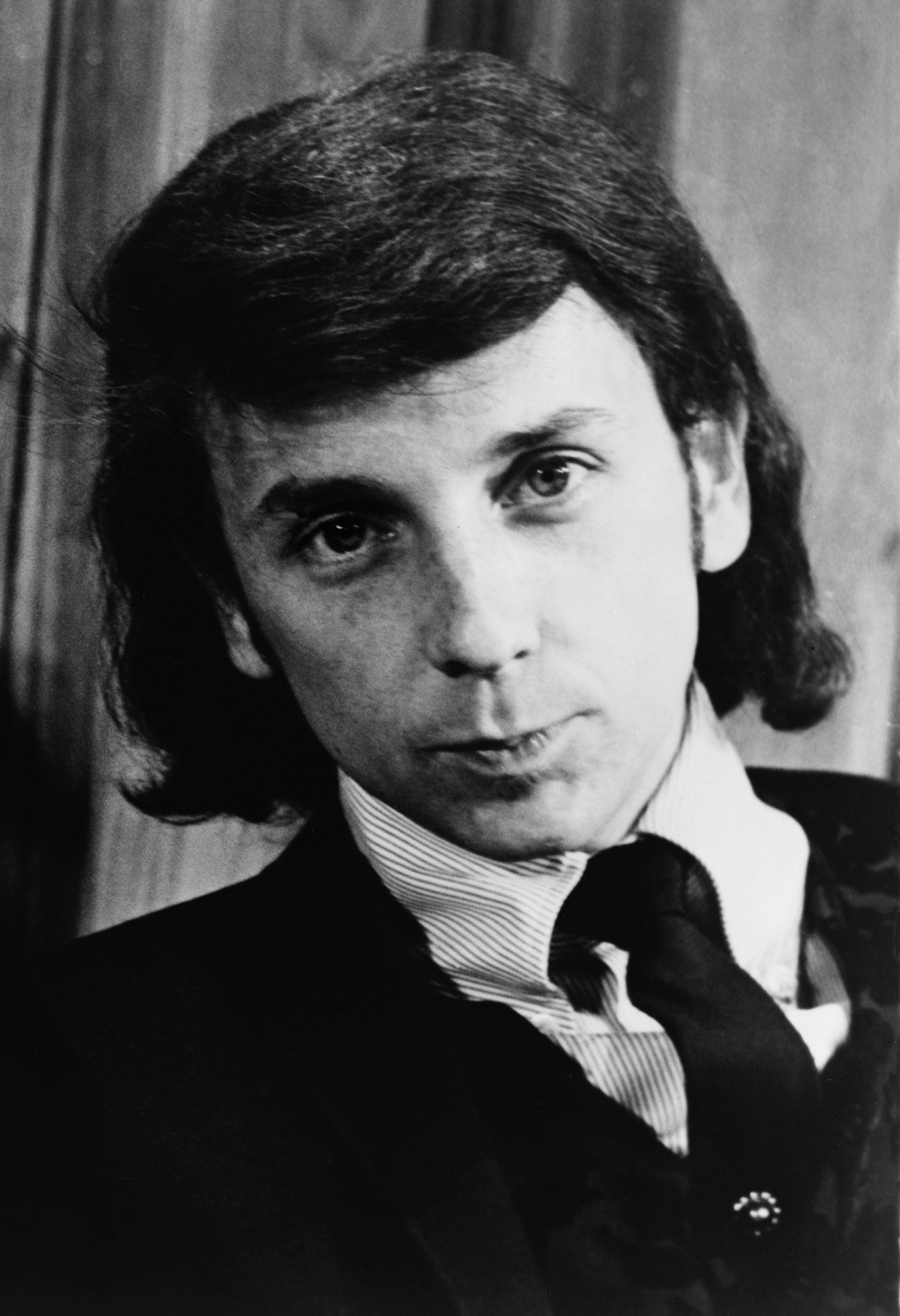
Phil Spector in 1965

In 1964, music producer Phil Spector conducted the band at a show in San Francisco where the Righteous Brothers was also appearing, and he was impressed enough with the duo to want them to record for his own label, Philles Records. All the songs previously produced by Spector for Philles Records featured African-American singers, and the Righteous Brothers would be his first white vocal act. However, they had a vocal style, termed blue-eyed soul, that suited Spector.

Spector commissioned Barry Mann and Cynthia Weil to write a song for them, bringing them over from New York to Los Angeles to stay at the Chateau Marmont so they could write the song. Taking a cue from "Baby I Need Your Loving" by The Four Tops, which was then rising in the charts, Mann and Weil decided to write a ballad. Mann wrote the melody first, and came up with the opening line, "You never close your eyes anymore when I kiss your lips", influenced by a line from the song "I Love How You Love Me" that was co-written by Mann and produced by Spector – "I love how your eyes close whenever you kiss me". Mann and Weil wrote the first two verses quickly, including the chorus line "you've lost that lovin' feelin'". When Spector joined in with the writing, he added "gone, gone, gone, whoa, whoa, whoa" to the end of the chorus, which Weil disliked. The line "you've lost that lovin' feelin'" was originally only intended to be a dummy line that would be replaced later, but Spector liked it and decided to keep it. The form of the song is of verse-chorus-verse-chorus-bridge-chorus or ABABCB form. Mann and Weil had problems writing the bridge and the ending, and asked Spector for help. Spector experimented on the piano with a "Hang On Sloopy" riff that they then built on for the bridge.

Weil recalled that, "after Phil, Barry and I finished [writing it], we took it over to the Righteous Brothers. Bill Medley, who has the low voice, seemed to like the song." However, Medley initially felt that the song did not suit their more uptempo rhythm and blues style, and Mann and Spector had sung the song in a higher key: "And we just thought, 'Wow, what a good song for The Everly Brothers.' But it didn't seem right for us." The song, which has a very big range, was originally written in the higher key of F. But to accommodate Medley's baritone voice, the key was gradually lowered to C♯ in the recording, which, together with slowing the song down, changed the "whole vibe of the song", according to Medley.

Bobby Hatfield reportedly expressed his annoyance to Spector when he learned that Medley would start the first verse alone and that he had to wait until the chorus before joining in. Prior to this, they would have been given equal prominence in a song. When Hatfield asked Spector just what he was supposed to do during Medley's solo, Spector replied, "You can go directly to the bank!"

== The Righteous Brothers recording ==
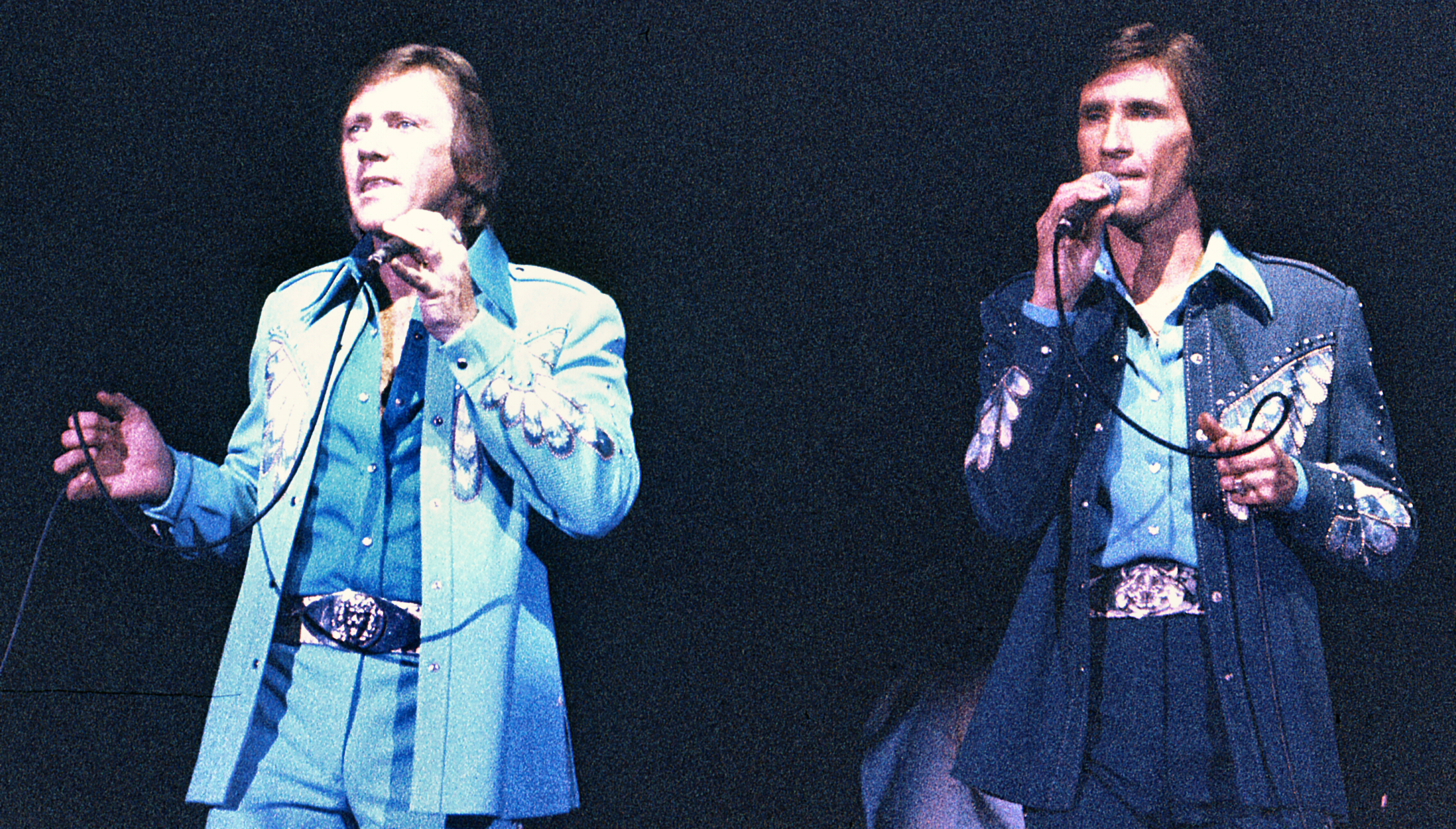
The Righteous Brothers performing at Knott's Berry Farm in the 1970s

The song was recorded on September 26, 1964, at Studio A of Gold Star Studios in Los Angeles. When Hatfield and Medley went to record the vocals a few weeks after the song was written, all the instrumental tracks had already been recorded and overdubbed. They recorded the vocal many times – Medley sang the opening verse over and over again until Spector was satisfied, and the process was then repeated with the next verse. The recording took over 39 takes and around eight hours over a period of two days.

The song would become one of the foremost examples of Spector's "Wall of Sound" technique. It features the studio musicians the Wrecking Crew; playing on this recording were Don Randi on piano, Tommy Tedesco on guitar, Carol Kaye and Ray Pohlman on bass, and Steve Douglas on sax. They were also joined by Barney Kessel on guitar and Earl Palmer on drums. Jack Nitzsche usually arranged the songs for Spector, but he was absent, and the arrangement was done by Gene Page. As with his other songs, Spector started by cutting the instrumental track first, building up layers of sound to create the Wall of Sound effect. The recording was done mono so Spector could fix the sound exactly as he wanted it. According to sound engineer Larry Levine, they started recording four acoustic guitars; when that was ready, they added the pianos, of which there were three; followed by three basses; the horns (two trumpets, two trombones, and three saxophones); then finally the drums. The vocals by Hatfield and Medley were then recorded and the strings overdubbed. The background singers were mainly the vocal group the Blossoms, accompanied by the Ronettes and joined in the song's crescendo by a young and then-unknown Cher. Reverb was applied in the recording, and more was added on the lead vocals during the mix. According to music writer Robert Palmer, the effect of the technique used was to create a sound that was "deliberately blurry, atmospheric, and of course huge; Wagnerian rock 'n' roll with all the trimmings."

"You've Lost That Lovin' Feelin'"
The slow start of "You've Lost That Lovin' Feelin'" with the deep voice of Bill Medley has been described as "one of the most famous openings of any pop song in history", but also misled some early listeners to think that it had been played at the wrong speed

The song started slowly in the recording, with Medley singing in a low baritone voice. Right before the second verse started, Spector wanted the tempo to stay the same, but the beat to be just a little behind where they are supposed to land to give the impression of the song slowing down. The recorded song was three ticks slower and a tone and a half lower than what Mann and Weil had written. When Mann heard the finished record over the phone, he thought that it had been mistakenly played at 33 1/3 instead of 45 rpm and told Spector, "Phil, you have it on the wrong speed!"

Even with his interest in the song, Medley had his doubts because it was unusually long for a pop song at the time. In an interview with Rolling Stone magazine, he recalled, "We had no idea if it would be a hit. It was too slow, too long, and right in the middle of The Beatles and the British Invasion." The song ran for nearly four minutes when released. This was too long by contemporary AM radio standards; radio stations at that time rarely played songs longer than three minutes because longer songs meant that fewer ads could be placed between song sets. Spector, however, refused to shorten it. Following a suggestion by Larry Levine, Spector had "3:05" printed on the label, instead of the track's actual running time of 3:45. He also added a false ending which made the recording more dramatic, and also tricked radio DJs into thinking it was a shorter song.

The production of the single cost Spector around $35,000, then a considerable amount. Spector himself was deeply concerned about the reception to a song that was unusual for its time, worrying that his vision would not be understood. He canvassed a few opinions – his publisher Don Kirshner suggested that the song should be re-titled "Bring Back That Lovin' Feelin'", while New York DJ Murray the K thought that bass line in the middle section, similar to that of a slowed-down "La Bamba", should be the start of the song. Spector took these as criticisms and later said: "I didn't sleep for a week when that record came out. I was so sick, I got a spastic colon; I had an ulcer."

=== Reception ===
Andrew Loog Oldham, who was then the manager of the Rolling Stones and a fan and friend of Spector, chanced upon Spector listening to a test pressing of the song that had just been delivered. Loog Oldham later wrote, "The room was filled with this amazing sound, I had no idea what it was, but it was the most incredible thing I'd ever heard." He added, "I'd never heard a recorded track so emotionally giving or empowering." Later, when Cilla Black recorded a rival version of the same song and it was racing up the British charts ahead of The Righteous Brothers' version, Loog Oldham was appalled, and took it upon himself to run a full-page ad in Melody Maker:

This advert is not for commercial gain, it is taken as something that must be said about the great new PHIL SPECTOR Record, THE RIGHTEOUS BROTHERS singing "YOU'VE LOST THAT LOVIN' FEELING". Already in the American Top Ten, this is Spector's greatest production, the last word in Tomorrow's sound Today, exposing the overall mediocrity of the Music Industry.

Signed,

Andrew Loog Oldham

In other ads, Loog Oldham also coined a new term to describe the song, "Phil Spector's Wall of Sound", which Spector later registered as a trademark.

Assessments by later music writers were highly positive. Nick Logan and Bob Woffinden thought that the song might be "the ultimate pop record ... here [Spector's] genius for production truly bloomed to create a single of epic proportion ..." Richard Williams, who wrote the 1972 biography of Phil Spector Out of His Head, considered the song to be one of the best records ever made, while Charlie Gillett in his 1970 book The Sound of the City: The Rise of Rock and Roll wrote that "the ebb and flow of passion the record achieved had no direct equivalent." Mick Brown, author of a biography of Spector, Tearing Down the Wall of Sound, considered the song to be "Spector's defining moment" and his "most Wagnerian production yet – a funeral march to departed love". The opening line was said to be "one of the most familiar opening passages in the history of pop", and Vanity Fair described the song as "the most erotic duet between men on record". However, when it was first presented on the BBC television panel show Juke Box Jury in January 1965 upon its release in the UK, it was voted a miss by all four of its panelists, with one juror echoing Barry Mann's concerns by questioning if it was played at the right speed.

There were initially reservations about the song from the radio industry; a common complaint was that it was too long, and others also questioned the speed of the song, and thought that the singer "keeps yelling". Some stations refused to play the song after checking its length, or after it had caused them to miss the news. The radio industry trade publication Gavin Report offered the opinion that "blue-eyed soul has gone too far". In Britain, Sam Costa, a DJ on the BBC Light Programme, said that The Righteous Brothers' record was a dirge, adding, "I wouldn't even play it in my toilet." However, despite the initial reservations, the song would become highly popular on radio.

Brian Wilson of the Beach Boys heard the song and rang Mann and Weil in January 1965 to say: "Your song is the greatest record ever. I was ready to quit the music business, but this has inspired me to write again." Wilson later referred to the Beach Boys' 1966 song "Good Vibrations" as his attempt to surpass "You've Lost That Lovin' Feelin'". Over the subsequent decades, he recorded numerous unreleased renditions of "You've Lost That Lovin' Feelin'". One of them, recorded during the sessions for the 1977 album The Beach Boys Love You, was released on the 2013 compilation Made in California.

Spector himself later rated the song as the pinnacle of his achievement at Philles Records.

=== Commercial success ===
"You've Lost That Lovin' Feelin'" debuted on the American national chart on December 12, 1964. It topped the Billboard Hot 100 on February 6, 1965, and remained there for another week; its 16-week run on the Hot 100 was unusually lengthy at that time. And it was the longest recording to top the chart up to that time. In addition, the single crossed over to the R&B charts, peaking at No. 2. Billboard ranked the record as the No. 5 single of 1965.

The single was released in the UK in January 1965, debuting at No. 35 in the chart dated January 20, 1965. In its fourth week it reached number one, where it remained for two weeks, replaced by the Kinks' "Tired of Waiting for You". It would become the only single to ever enter the UK Top Ten three times, being re-released in 1969 (No. 10), and again in 1990 (No. 3). The 1990 re-release was issued as a double A-sided single with "Ebb Tide" and was a follow-up to the re-release of "Unchained Melody", which had hit number one as a result of being featured in the blockbuster film Ghost. "You've Lost That Lovin' Feelin'" also reached No. 42 after a 1977 re-release and in 1988 reached No. 87.

In Ireland, "You've Lost That Lovin' Feelin'" charted twice, first in January 1965, when it peaked at No. 2, and again in December 1990, following its reissue as a double A-sided single with "Ebb Tide", when it climbed to No. 2 again. The original Righteous Brothers recording remains the only version of the song to chart in Ireland. In the Netherlands "You've Lost That Lovin' Feelin'" reached No. 8 in March 1965, with three versions ranked together as one entry: those of the Righteous Brothers, Cilla Black (a UK No. 2) and Dutch singer Trea Dobbs.

=== Accolades ===
In 1965, the Righteous Brothers recording of "You've Lost That Lovin' Feelin'" was nominated in the Best Rock and Roll Recording category at the 7th Annual Grammy Awards. It was also awarded Best Pop Single To Date 1965 in the Billboard Disc Jockey Poll.

In 1998, the original 1964 recording of the song on the Philles label was inducted into the Grammy Hall of Fame.

In 2001, this recording was ranked at No. 9 in the list of Songs of the Century released by the Recording Industry Association of America and the National Endowment for the Arts. In 2004, the same recording was ranked at No. 34 by Rolling Stone magazine in their list of the 500 Greatest Songs of All Time. In 2005, "You've Lost That Lovin' Feelin'" was awarded the Songwriters Hall of Fame's Towering Song Award presented to "the creators of an individual song that has influenced the culture in a unique way over many years".

In 2015, the National Recording Registry of the Library of Congress, which each year selects from 130 years of sound recordings for special recognition and preservation, chose the Righteous Brothers rendition as one of the 25 recordings that have "cultural, artistic and/or historical significance to American society and the nation's audio legacy".

=== Chart performance ===
==== Weekly charts ====
Chart (1964–1965)	Peak position
Canada Top Singles (RPM)	1
Ireland (IRMA)	2
Netherlands (Dutch Top 40)	8
UK Singles (Official Charts)	1
US Billboard Hot 100	1
US Cash Box Top 100	1
West Germany (GfK)	21

Chart (1969)	Peak position
UK Singles (Official Charts)	12

Chart (1977)	Peak position
UK Singles (Official Charts)	42

Chart (1988)	Peak position
Belgium (Ultratop 50 Flanders)	16
Netherlands (Single Top 100)	13
UK Singles (Official Charts)	87

Chart (1990–1991)	Peak position
Ireland (IRMA)	2
Luxembourg (Radio Luxembourg)	1
New Zealand (Recorded Music NZ)	18
UK Singles (Official Charts)	3
UK Airplay (Music Week)	2

==== Year-end charts ====
Chart (1965)	Rank
US Billboard Hot 100	5
UK Singles (OCC)	26

=== Certifications ===
Region	Certification	Certified units/sales
United Kingdom (BPI)	Silver	200,000^{‡}
^{‡} Sales+streaming figures based on certification alone.

== Cilla Black version ==
"You've Lost That Lovin' Feelin'"
- Side-A label of UK single

Single by Cilla Black

from the album Is It Love?
- B-side: "Is It Love?"
- Released: January 1965
- Studio: Abbey Road, London
- Genre: Pop; R&B; blue-eyed soul
- Length: 3:09
- Label: Parlophone
- Songwriters: Phil Spector; Barry Mann; Cynthia Weil
- Producer: George Martin

Cilla Black singles chronology
"It's for You" (1964)	"You've Lost That Lovin' Feelin'" (1965)	"I've Been Wrong Before" (1965)

Official audio
- "You've Lost That Lovin' Feelin'" on YouTube

=== Background ===
British singer Cilla Black first achieved major chart success by covering Dionne Warwick's newly released American hit "Anyone Who Had a Heart" for the UK market, which gave her a number-one hit in both the UK Singles Chart and the Irish Singles Chart in February 1964, out-performing Warwick's original version, which only peaked at No. 42 in the UK. Black's producer George Martin repeated this strategy with the Righteous Brothers "You've Lost That Lovin' Feeling" that had just been released in the US. Black's version is shorter with an abbreviated bridge, of which she said: "I don't want people to get bored". The abridgement also removed the necessity of Black's attempting to match the Righteous Brothers' climactic vocal trade-off.

=== Chart rivalry ===
Both Black's and the Righteous Brothers versions of the song debuted on the UK chart in the same week in January 1965, with Black debuting higher at No. 28. According to Tony Hall of Decca Records who was responsible for promoting the Righteous Brothers record in the UK, Black's version was preferred by BBC radio where one of its DJs disparaged the Righteous Brothers' version as a "dirge" and refused to play it. Hall therefore requested that Spector send the Righteous Brothers over to Britain to promote the song so it might have a chance on the chart.

The following week Black remained in ascendancy at No. 12 with the Righteous Brothers at No. 20. The Righteous Brothers came over to Britain, spent a week promoting the song and performed for television shows in Manchester and Birmingham. At the same time, Andrew Loog Oldham placed a full-page ad in Melody Maker promoting the Righteous Brothers version at his own initiative and expense, and urged the readers to watch the Righteous Brothers appearance on the ITV television show Ready Steady Go! In its third week on the February 3, 1965, chart, Black jumped to No. 2, while the Righteous Brothers made an even larger jump to No. 3. Hall recalled meeting at a party Brian Epstein, the manager of Black, who said that Black's version would be number one and told Hall, "You haven't a hope in hell."

However, in its fourth week, Black's version began its descent, dropping to No. 5, while the Righteous Brothers climbed to number one. Cilla Black then reportedly cabled her congratulations to the Righteous Brothers on their reaching number one. Black's version of "You've Lost That Lovin' Feelin'" would prove to be her highest charting UK single apart from her two number ones: "Anyone Who Had a Heart" and "You're My World". While Black's version was released in Ireland, it did not make the official Irish Singles Chart as published by RTÉ, but it reached No. 5 on the unofficial Evening Herald charts.

Black remade "You've Lost That Lovin' Feelin'" for her 1985 Surprisingly Cilla album.

=== Chart performance ===
==== Weekly charts ====
Chart (1965)	Peak position
Australia Go-Set	15
UK Singles (Official Charts)	2
The Netherlands (Muziek Expres)	9

==== Year-end charts ====
Chart (1965)	Rank
UK Singles Chart	77

== Dionne Warwick version ==
"You've Lost That Lovin' Feeling"
- Side A of US single of Warwick's recording

Single by Dionne Warwick

from the album Soulful
- B-side: "Window Wishing"
- Released: September 1969
- Studio: American Sound, Memphis
- Genre: Soul; Pop; R&B
- Length: 4:23 (album version); 3:02 (single version)
- Label: Scepter
- Songwriters: Phil Spector; Barry Mann; Cynthia Weil
- Producers: Chips Moman; Dionne Warwick

Dionne Warwick singles chronology
"Odds and Ends" (1969)	"You've Lost That Lovin' Feeling" (1969)	"I'll Never Fall in Love Again" (1970)

Official audio
- "You've Lost That Lovin' Feeling" (album version) on YouTube

=== Background ===
In 1969, American singer Dionne Warwick recorded a cover version of "You've Lost That Lovin' Feeling" for her studio album Soulful. Her version was the only single released from the album and it was aimed to showcase Warwick as more of an R&B singer than was evidenced by her work with Burt Bacharach. Co-produced by Warwick and Chips Moman and recorded at American Sound Studios in Memphis, Tennessee, Soulful was one of Warwick's most successful albums peaking at No. 11 on the Billboard 200 album chart. The single "You've Lost That Lovin' Feeling" reached No. 16 on the Billboard Hot 100 chart, and charted at No. 13 on the Billboard R&B singles chart. In Australia the Go-Set Top 40 chart ranked Warwick's version of "You've Lost That Lovin' Feeling" with a No. 34 peak in January 1970. In Warwick's version of the song, she spells the last word of the title out fully as "feeling" rather than the usual "feelin'".

=== Chart performance ===
==== Weekly charts ====
Chart (1969–1970)	Peak position
Australia Go-Set	34
Canada Top Singles (RPM)	12
Canada Adult Contemporary (RPM)	10
US Billboard Hot 100	16
US Adult Contemporary (Billboard)	10
US Hot R&B/Hip-Hop Songs (Billboard)	13
US Cash Box Top 100	14

==== Year-end charts ====
(1969)	Rank
US Billboard Hot 100 *	132

(* - unofficial stratified ranking)

== Roberta Flack and Donny Hathaway version ==
"You've Lost That Lovin' Feelin'"
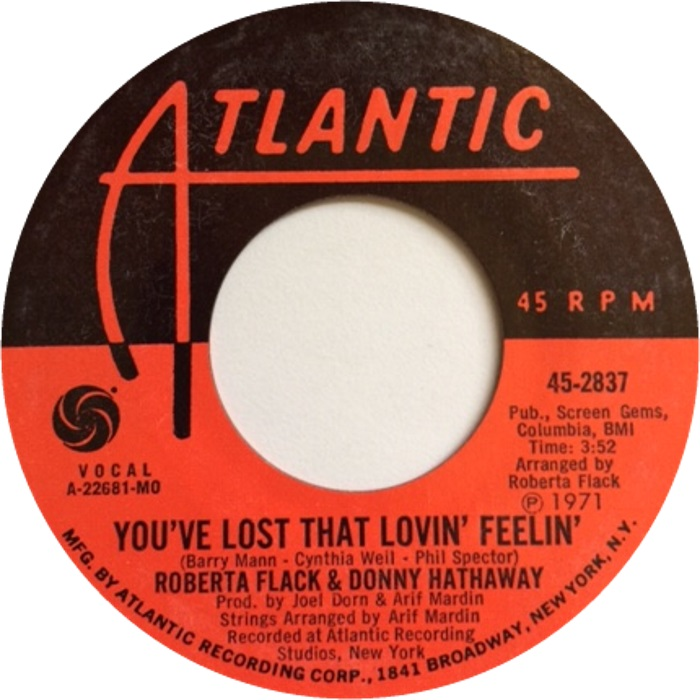
- Side A of the original US single

Single by Roberta Flack and Donny Hathaway

from the album Roberta Flack & Donny Hathaway
- B-side: "Be Real Black for Me"
- Released: September 25, 1971
- Recorded: 1971
- Studio: Atlantic, New York City
- Genre: R&B; Soul
- Length: 6:36 (album version); 3:52 (single version)
- Label: Atlantic
- Songwriters: Phil Spector; Barry Mann; Cynthia Weil
- Producers: Joel Dorn; Arif Mardin

Roberta Flack and Donny Hathaway singles chronology
"You've Got a Friend" (1971)	"You've Lost That Lovin' Feelin'" (1971)	"Where Is the Love" (1972)

Official audio
- "You've Lost That Lovin' Feelin'" (album version; 2026 remaster) on YouTube

=== Background ===
In 1971, American singers Roberta Flack and Donny Hathaway recorded a cover version of "You've Lost That Lovin' Feelin'". Their version of the song was produced by Joel Dorn and was included on their 1972 self-titled duet album Roberta Flack & Donny Hathaway, issued on the Atlantic Records label. Their version of the song was released as the second single from the album after the Top 30 version of "You've Got a Friend". The Flack/Hathaway take on "You've Lost That Lovin' Feelin'" reached No. 30 on the Billboard R&B singles chart and charted at No. 71 on the Billboard Hot 100 pop chart. It also reached No. 57 in the Cash Box Top 100 Singles and peaked at No. 53 on the Record World 100 Pop Chart.

=== Chart performance ===
==== Weekly charts ====
Chart (1971)	Peak position
US Billboard Hot 100	71
US Hot R&B/Hip-Hop Songs (Billboard)	30
US Cashbox Top 100	57

==== Year-end charts ====
Year-end chart (1971)	Rank
US Billboard Hot 100	422

== Long John Baldry version ==
"You've Lost That Lovin' Feelin'"
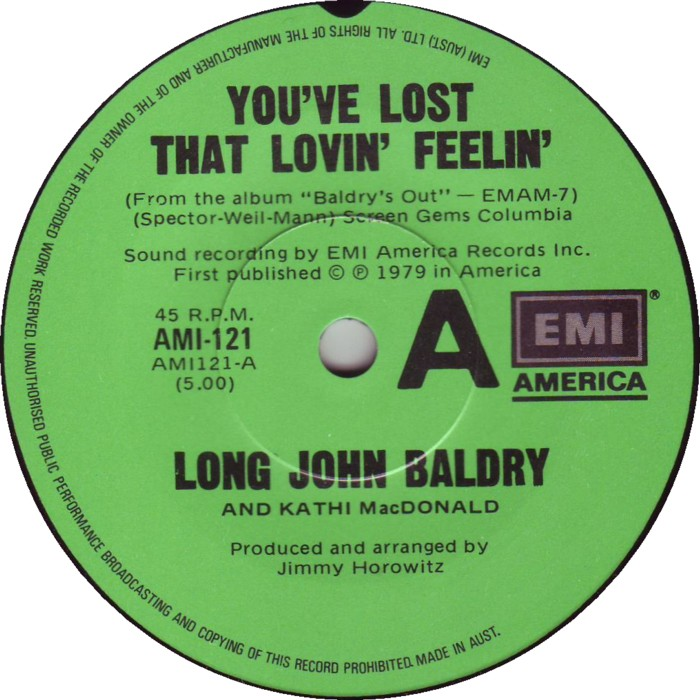
- Side A of the 1980 Australian single

Single by Long John Baldry and Kathi McDonald

from the album Baldry's Out
- B-side: "Baldry's Out"
- Released: May 1979
- Genre: Rock
- Length: 5:00
- Label: EMI Capitol
- Songwriters: Phil Spector; Barry Mann; Cynthia Weil
- Producer: Jimmy Horowitz

Long John Baldry and Kathi McDonald singles chronology
"You've Lost That Lovin' Feelin'" (1979)	"Ain't That Peculiar" (1986)

Music video
- "You've Lost That Lovin' Feelin'" on YouTube

=== Background ===
In 1979, British-Canadian blues singer Long John Baldry recorded a cover version of "You've Lost That Loving Feeling'" as a duet with American singer Kathi McDonald for his album Baldry's Out, the Jimmy Horowitz-produced disc which was Baldry's first recording in his newly adopted homeland of Canada. In this version, Kathi McDonald sang the latter half of the first verse using the part from the second verse ("It makes me just feel like crying ..."), inverting the usual order.

Released as a single that summer, Baldry's "You've Lost That Lovin' Feelin'" charted at No. 45 on the Canadian RPM singles chart, and spilled over into the US Billboard Hot 100 chart at No. 89. The single also reached No. 2 in Australia in 1980. Bill Medley of the Righteous Brothers told Baldry that he liked their remake of the song better than his own. Baldry had first recorded the song – as "You've Lost That Lovin' Feelin'" – for his 1966 album Looking at Long John. The Baldry/McDonald duet version of "You've Lost That Loving Feeling" also reached No. 37 in New Zealand.

=== Charts ===
==== Weekly charts ====
Chart (1979–1980)	Peak position
Australia (Kent Music Report)	2
Canada Top Singles (RPM)	45
New Zealand (Recorded Music NZ)	37
US Billboard Hot 100	89

==== Year-end charts ====
Chart (1980)	Position
Australia (Kent Music Report)	17

== Hall & Oates version ==
"You've Lost That Lovin' Feelin'"
- Side A of the original US single

Single by Hall & Oates

from the album Voices
- B-side: "United State" (UK); "Diddy Doo Wop (I Hear the Voices)" (US, Canada and Germany)
- Released: September 27, 1980
- Recorded: Early 1980, New York City
- Genre: Blue-eyed soul; soft rock
- Length: 4:37 (album version); 4:10 (single version)
- Label: RCA
- Songwriters: Phil Spector; Barry Mann; Cynthia Weil
- Producer: Daryl Hall & John Oates

Hall & Oates singles chronology
"How Does It Feel to Be Back" (1980)	"You've Lost That Lovin' Feelin'" (1980)	"Kiss on My List" (1980)

Music video
- "You've Lost That Lovin' Feelin'" on YouTube

=== Background ===
In 1980, the American musical duo Hall & Oates recorded a cover version of "You've Lost That Lovin' Feelin'" for their ninth studio album Voices. Their version of the song was produced by the duo and included a sparse arrangement contrasting with the lavish Righteous Brothers original version. It was the second non-original song Hall & Oates had ever recorded. According to Oates, this was the last song recorded for the album, as it had been deemed complete with the other ten tracks. However, Hall and Oates felt that there was "something missing" from the album. Then they came across the Righteous Brothers' version of the song on a jukebox machine while going out to get food and they decided to cover it. They went back to the studio, cut it in a period of four hours, and placed it on the album.

The track was issued on RCA Records as the album's second single after the original "How Does It Feel to Be Back" peaked at No. 30 on the Billboard Hot 100. The November peak of No. 12 on the Hot 100 chart made "You've Lost That Lovin' Feelin'" the first Hall & Oates single to ascend higher than No. 18 since the number one hit "Rich Girl" in the spring of 1977. "You've Lost That Lovin' Feelin'" also reached No. 15 on the Billboard Adult Contemporary chart, on the Radio & Records Airplay chart the song debuted at No. 30 on the September 26, 1980, issue, after seven weeks it reached and peaked at No. 4 staying there for one week, the song stayed on the top 10 of the chart for six weeks and remained on it for thirteen. It also reached No. 55 in the UK Singles Chart.

=== Chart performance ===
==== Weekly charts ====
Chart (1980–1981)	Peak position
Canada Top Singles (RPM)	96
Canada Adult Contemporary (RPM)	10
UK Singles (Official Charts)	55
US Billboard Hot 100	12
US Radio & Records CHR/Pop Airplay Chart	4
US Adult Contemporary (Billboard)	15

==== Year-end charts ====
Chart (1981)	Rank
US Billboard Hot 100	90

== Other notable versions ==
- 1975 – "You've Lost That Lovin' Feelin'" charted C&W at No. 41 for Barbara Fairchild in 1975.
- 1975 – The song was covered by Telly Savalas as a follow-up to his No. 1 single in the UK charts, a cover of Bread's "If". It reached No. 47 in the UK charts.
- 1986 – a remake of "You've Lost That Lovin' Feelin'" by Grant & Forsyth (formerly of Guys 'n' Dolls) reached no. 48 in the Netherlands.
- 1986 – the song is prominently featured in the film Top Gun, when Maverick (Tom Cruise) and Goose (Anthony Edwards) sing it to Charlie (Kelly McGillis) at a naval bar; actor Clarence Gilyard sings the second verse. The Righteous Brothers version is later played near the end of the film.
- 1988 – Carroll Baker took the song to No. 7 on the Country Singles chart in Canada.
- 1990 -- Bill Medley went back and recorded a solo version of "You've Lost That Lovin' Feelin'," the video for which suggests it was from the motion picture "The Last Boy Scout."
- 1996 – Günther Neefs reached No. 31 on the Belgian charts (Flemish region) with his 1996 recording "You've Lost That Lovin' Feeling".
- The song charted at No. 57 in Netherlands in 2002 for André Hazes & Johnny Logan.
- Orville Peck and Paul Cauthen recorded a version in 2021 as The Unrighteous Brothers, released alongside their cover of Unchained Melody.

== Popularity ==
The song is highly popular on the radio; according to the performing-rights organization Broadcast Music, Inc. (BMI), it became the most-played song of all time on American radio in 1997 with over 7 million airplays (all versions), overtaking the Beatles' "Yesterday". At the end of 1999, the song was ranked by the BMI as the most-played song of the 20th century, having been broadcast more than 8 million times on American radio and television, and it remains the most-played song, having accumulated almost 15 million airplays in the US by 2011. The song also received 11 BMI Pop Awards by 1997, the most for any song, and has received 14 in total so far. In 2019, "Every Breath You Take" by The Police displaced it as the most played song on US radio.

The popularity of the song also means that it is one of the highest grossing songs for its copyright holders. It was estimated by the BBC programme The Richest Songs in the World in 2012 to be the third biggest earner of royalties of all songs, behind "White Christmas" and "Happy Birthday to You".
