= Little Latin Lupe Lu =

Single by the Righteous Brothers
- B-side: "I'm So Lonely"
- Released: December 1962
- Recorded: November 1962
- Genre: R&B; blue-eyed soul
- Length: 2:00
- Label: Moonglow M-215
- Songwriter(s): Bill Medley
- Producer(s): Ray Maxwell

The Righteous Brothers singles chronology
"Little Latin Lupe Lu" (1962)	"My Babe" (1963)

"Little Latin Lupe Lu" was written by Bill Medley in 1962, and became the song that launched the Righteous Brothers' career. Though it peaked on the Billboard Hot 100 at number 49 on June 8, 1963, Medley and his partner, Bobby Hatfield, were offered a national distribution contract by VeeJay records. It was purchased the following year by Phil Spector, who went on to produce their most successful recordings. The song has been covered by more than twenty artists, notably by Bruce Springsteen, from 1977-2009.

== Original version ==
Little Latin Lupe Lu ("Lupe") was written by 19-year-old Bill Medley when he and Bobby Hatfield were in a five-piece band called the Paramours. It's about a girl he dated at Santa Ana High School in California named Lupe Laguna, whose nickname was "Lupe Lu." Medley later described it as "a silly little song, about a girl who likes to dance". He taught the song to Hatfield, then contacted Ray Maxwell, the owner of a local label called Moonglow Records, who came to hear the duo sing it. Maxwell had them record the song, but since it was just Hatfield and Medley, they needed a new name.

This often-told story varies in location, but always involves U.S. Marines stationed at the nearby El Toro Marine base. At the end of a performance, an African-American soldier in the audience shouted, "That was righteous, brothers!" Walking in from the parking lot for another performance, a group of Marines spotted them, and one called out, "Hey righteous brothers, how you doin'?" From then on, they were "the Righteous Brothers".

Nothing happened when "Lupe" was released, so Hatfield and Medley took some gigs at The Rendezvous Ballroom in Newport Beach, California, which was a surf rock dance club where Dick Dale also played. According to Medley, they were reluctant at first to perform, but "it fit this surf dance that they were doing" and became a big hit with the patrons. When the local record store told their new fans they had never heard of it, "Bobby Hatfield and our road manager took about 1500 copies to the record store, and we told the kids where to buy them. Well, 1500 kids went down and bought this record."

In the same 2010 interview, Medley explained, "In those days, radio stations would call record stores to see what was selling." When Los Angeles stations KFWB and KRLA heard that 1500 records had been sold, they added "Lupe" to their programing list, and soon they were getting requests for the song. It became a local hit, reaching No. 4 on KRLA and No. 5 on KFWB. On May 11, 1963, it entered the Billboard Hot 100, reaching No. 49 and finishing after 7 weeks on the chart. It also reached No. 47 on the Cashbox music chart.

Cash Box described it as "a fabulous stomp-a-rock’er...that the Righteous Bros, belt out in a manner the teeners’ll flip over."

== Later versions ==
- The south Minneapolis surf rock band the Chancellors recorded "Little Latin Lupe Lu" on October 13, 1964 at Kay Bank Studios in Minneapolis. The record was released under the Soma label in the United States and Apex Records in Canada. It was a regional hit for the Chancellors, arriving on the WDGY charts December 26, 1964 and reaching No. 1 in Minneapolis on January 23, 1965. The Chancellors remained at No. 1 for three weeks and in the Top 40 for 11 weeks. As "Little Latin Lupe Lu" faded from the Twin Cities’ charts, it appeared in Chicago on April 2, 1965. The Chancellors stayed in the WLS charts for seven weeks, peaking at No. 14.
- The Kingsmen recorded a version of the song reaching No. 46 on the Billboard chart and No. 49 on the Cashbox chart in 1964.
- A few years later, the pioneering all-woman garage band the Heart Beats released a version where Lupe Lu was a boy.
- In 1966, Mitch Ryder & the Detroit Wheels had the most success with their recording, hitting No. 17 on Billboard's, Hot 100, and No. 16 on Cashbox.
- The Box Tops also recorded a version in 1998.
- The song has been performed multiple times by Bruce Springsteen, most recently in 2009 on his Working on a Dream Tour at Gillette Stadium in Massachusetts as a request by sign from a fan with the lyrics written on the back of the sign.

== Film reference ==
"Little Latin Lupe Lu" is mentioned in the film High Fidelity (based on the Nick Hornby novel of the same name) as track number 2 on Barry's (played by Jack Black) Monday-morning mix tape. The other employee, Dick, states that he prefers the version by Mitch Ryder & the Detroit Wheels, which angers Barry due to his belief that the Righteous Brothers' original is the best version.
