= Ebb Tide (song) =

1953 song by Carl Sigman and Robert Maxwell

Single by Frank Chacksfield
- B-side: "Waltzing Bugle Boy"
- Released: June 1953
- Recorded: 1953
- Genre: Big band
- Length: 2:57
- Label: Decca
- Songwriters: Robert Maxwell, Carl Sigman

Frank Chacksfield singles chronology
"Terry's Theme from Limelight" (1953)	"Ebb Tide" (1953)	"In Old Lisbon" (1956)

"Ebb Tide"

Single by the Righteous Brothers

from the album Back to Back
- B-side: "(I Love You) For Sentimental Reasons"
- Released: November 1965
- Genre: Blue-eyed soul
- Length: 2:48
- Label: Philles
- Songwriters: Robert Maxwell, Carl Sigman
- Producer: Phil Spector

The Righteous Brothers singles chronology
"For Your Love" (1965)	"Ebb Tide" (1965)	"Georgia on My Mind" (1966)

"Ebb Tide" is a popular song written in 1953 by the lyricist Carl Sigman and composer and harpist Robert Maxwell. The first version was sung by Vic Damone backed by Richard Hayman's orchestra. The highest-selling version was released by the Righteous Brothers in 1965.

This song is not to be confused with the title song from the film Ebb Tide (1937), which is a composition by Leo Robin and Ralph Rainger.

== Notable recordings ==
The best-known versions are by:

- In 1953, Frank Chacksfield and his Orchestra reached number two on the US pop chart, and number nine on the UK chart with an instrumental version of the song.
- In 1954, Roy Hamilton reached number five on the US Best Sellers in Stores chart.
- In 1958, Frank Sinatra recorded a Nelson Riddle arranged interpretation of the song as part of his album, "Frank Sinatra Sings for Only the Lonely".
- In 1960 The Platters reached #39 in Canada with their version.
- In 1965, the Righteous Brothers' vocal version was the most successful, peaking at number five on the US Hot 100. In Canada it also reached number 5. Bobby Hatfield sang the lead on this song, and it was one of the last songs that Phil Spector produced for the Righteous Brothers. Originally peaking at number 48 in the UK in January 1966, it was re-issued there as a double A-sided single with the re-release of "You've Lost That Lovin' Feelin'" in December 1990, reaching a new peak of number three.
