= He (song) =

Single by Al Hibbler
- B-side: "Breeze (Blow My Baby Back To Me)"
- Released: 1955
- Genre: Christian music
- Length: 3:02
- Label: Decca
- Songwriters: Lyrics: Richard Mullan; Music:Jack Richards

Al Hibbler singles chronology
"Danny Boy" (1955)	"He" (1955)	"This Love of Mine" (1955)

"He" is a song about God, written in 1954. The song made the popular music charts the following year.

The music was written by Jack Richards, with lyrics by Richard Mullan. The song was originally published by Avas Music Publishing, Inc.

== First recordings ==
The first recording to be released was by Al Hibbler, whose version reached No. 4 on Billboard's chart of Best Sellers in Stores, No. 7 on Billboard's Top 100, No. 7 on Billboard's chart of Most Played by Jockeys, and No. 8 on Billboard's chart of Most Played in Juke Boxes. Despite its popularity with listeners to Radio Luxenbourg, the song never reached the British charts - mainly due to the ban imposed by the BBC on popular songs with what they termed pseudo-religious lyrics and both Hibbler's and the version by the McGuire Sisters lost out due to that decision.

The McGuire Sisters also released a version of the song in 1955, which reached No. 10 on Billboard's chart of Most Played in Juke Boxes, No. 12 on Billboard's Top 100, No. 12 on Billboard's chart of Best Sellers in Stores, and No. 16 on Billboard's chart of Most Played by Jockeys.

The song was ranked No. 33 on Billboard's ranking of "1955's Top Tunes", based on the Honor Roll of Hits and No. 34 on Billboard's ranking of "1956's Top Tunes".

== Other recordings ==
- Andy Williams released a version on his 1960 album, The Village of St. Bernadette.
- The Righteous Brothers released a version of the song in 1966, which spent eight weeks on the Billboard Hot 100 chart, peaking at No. 18.
- Diana Ross & The Supremes covered the song for In Loving Memory, a 1968 gospel compilation featuring Motown Records artists.
- Elvis Presley recorded the song in 1960 at his home in Bel Air.
