= Moonglow Records =

Record label in the 1960s

- Founded: 1960
- Country of origin: United States

Moonglow Records was a small record label in the 1960s. They were famous for signing The Righteous Brothers before they were signed by Phil Spector for his Philles Records. The label was initially independently distributed, but they became an Atlantic distributed label very early on. The record label was based on Selma Avenue in Hollywood.

The Moonglow Records building was purchased in 1969 by former RCA recording engineer and Warner Bros. Records/Reprise producer, David Hassinger who renamed it The Sound Factory. The Sound Factory went on to become one of the most popular recording studios in Hollywood.

== See also ==
- List of record labels
