= Rock and Roll Heaven =

1973 song co-written by Alan O'Day

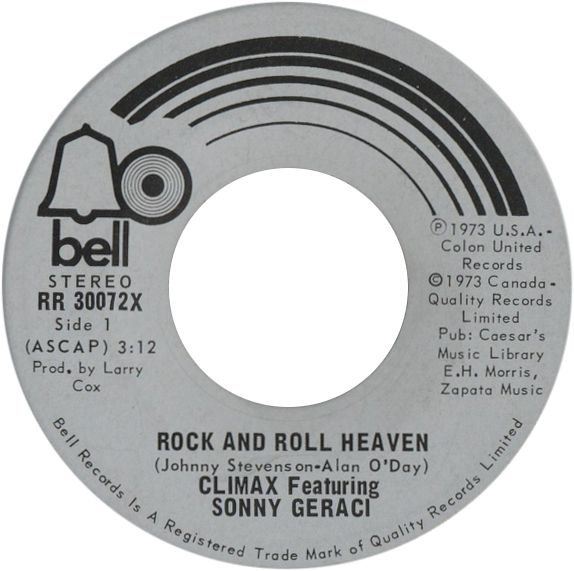
- Side A of the Canadian single

Single by Climax
- B-side: "Face the Music"
- Released: 1973
- Genre: Rock and roll
- Length: 3:00
- Label: Rocky Road
- Songwriters: Alan O'Day, Johnny Stevenson
- Producer: Larry Cox

"Rock and Roll Heaven" is a song written by Alan O'Day and Johnny Stevenson, popularized by The Righteous Brothers. It is a paean to several deceased singers such as Jimi Hendrix, Janis Joplin, and Otis Redding, and has been rewritten a number of times to include other singers. The song was first recorded by the band Climax in 1973 (co-writer Stevenson was the keyboard player for Climax, and the song was specifically written for the band's lead singer, Sonny Geraci), but it failed to chart. It was then covered by The Righteous Brothers in 1974 and reached number three on the U.S. Billboard Hot 100.

== The Righteous Brothers version ==
"Rock and Roll Heaven"
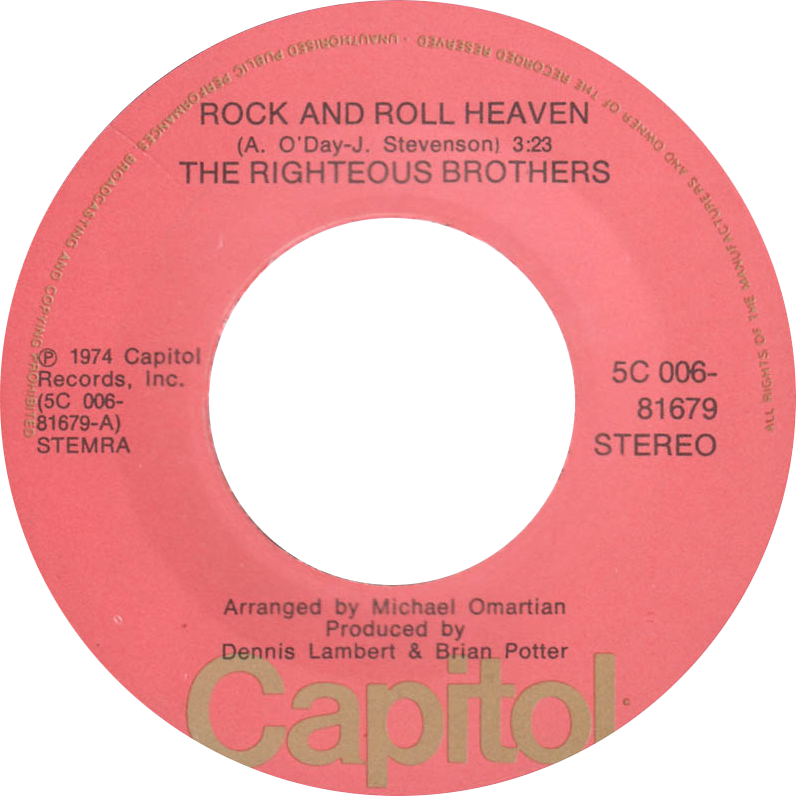
- Side A of the Dutch single

Single by The Righteous Brothers

from the album Give It to the People
- B-side: "I Just Wanna Be Me"
- Released: May 1974
- Genre: Pop
- Length: 3:22
- Label: Haven/Capitol
- Songwriters: Alan O'Day; Johnny Stevenson
- Producers: Dennis Lambert and Brian Potter

The Righteous Brothers singles chronology
"Only You (And You Alone)" (1969)	"Rock and Roll Heaven" (1974)	"Give It to the People" (1974)

The Righteous Brothers recorded "Rock and Roll Heaven" a few weeks after they decided to reform the duo in 1974. They signed with Haven Records run by Dennis Lambert and Brian Potter and were given the song to record. Lambert and Potter rewrote a verse, updating the song to include Jim Croce and Bobby Darin who both had died within exactly three months of each other in late 1973. According to Bill Medley, they were dubious about the song because they did not think the song had the "old Righteous Brothers feel". Nevertheless, it became a hit for them and quickly reached number three on the Billboard Hot 100. In Canada it spent three weeks at number four.

=== Musicians and songs mentioned in Righteous Brothers version ===
- "Jimi gave us rainbows" refers to Rainbow Bridge by Jimi Hendrix.
- "Janis took a piece of our hearts" refers to the recording of "Piece of My Heart" by Big Brother and the Holding Company featuring Janis Joplin.
- "Otis brought us all to the dock of the bay" refers to "(Sittin' On) The Dock of the Bay" by Otis Redding.
- "Sing a song to light my fire. Remember Jim that way" refers to "Light My Fire" by The Doors which featured Jim Morrison.
- "Remember bad bad Leroy Brown, Hey Jimmy touched us with that song" refers to "Bad, Bad Leroy Brown" by Jim Croce.
- "Bobby gave us Mack the Knife" refers to Bobby Darin's recording of "Mack the Knife".

The lyrics involving Jim Croce and Bobby Darin replaced Climax's lyrics for Buddy Holly ("Peggy Sue") and Ritchie Valens ("Donna"), both of whom died in a plane crash that had already been commemorated by another hit song, Don McLean's "American Pie”.

Also, in 1981, when the Righteous Brothers appeared for a one-song reunion on American Bandstand, they performed "Rock and Roll Heaven", and made it longer including new lyrics as tributes to Elvis Presley, John Lennon, and Keith Moon. The tribute to Moon was inserted between those for Redding and Morrison; the Presley tribute was the entire second verse, replacing those for Croce and Darin; and a new third verse memorialized Lennon, whose murder by Mark David Chapman on 8 December 1980 was mentioned by the line "Now we've lost John Lennon in the cruelest way".

It was rewritten with new lyrics again in 1991 to mourn the passing of Elvis Presley ("Love Me Tender"), John Lennon ("Give Peace a Chance"), Roy Orbison ("Oh, Pretty Woman"), Jackie Wilson ("Higher and Higher"), Ricky Nelson ("Lonesome Town"), Dennis Wilson ("Good Vibrations"), Marvin Gaye ("What's Going On"), Sam Cooke ("Wonderful World"), Cass Elliot ("Monday, Monday") who died a few months after the first Righteous Brothers version of the song was released, and Stevie Ray Vaughan. The rewritten song is included in compilation albums such as Reunion.

== In popular culture ==
A line from the lyrics of the song is used as the title of Stephen King's short story "You Know They Got a Hell of a Band", set in a town called Rock and Roll Heaven.

== Chart performance ==
=== Weekly charts ===
Chart (1974)	Peak position
Australia (Kent Music Report)	25
Canada Top Singles (RPM)	4
US Billboard Hot 100	3
US Billboard Adult Contemporary	38
US Cash Box Top 100	4

=== Year-end charts ===
Chart (1974)	Rank
Canada Top Singles (RPM)	63
US Billboard Hot 100	58
US Cash Box	43
