= Showaddywaddy discography =

Wikimedia band discography

- Publicity photograph of Showaddywaddy during the mid-1970s, showcasing the complete classic eight-member lineup in their iconic multi-coloured Teddy Boy drape suits.
- Studio albums: 14
- Live albums: 1
- Compilation albums: 22
- Singles: 34
- Video albums: 4

The discography of English rock and roll revival band Showaddywaddy consists of 14 studio albums, one live album, numerous compilation albums and 34 singles. The band’s recording career began in 1974 with their self-titled debut album and the single "Hey Rock and Roll", which reached number two on the UK Singles Chart. They subsequently achieved ten UK top-ten singles, including the 1976 number-one single "Under the Moon of Love".

Showaddywaddy’s most commercially successful period was during the mid-to-late 1970s. Their first six studio albums all reached the UK Albums Chart, with Showaddywaddy peaking at number nine, Step Two at number seven, Trocadero at number 41, Red Star at number 20, Crepes & Drapes at number eight and Bright Lights at number 33. Their compilation albums Greatest Hits (1976) and Greatest Hits 1976–1978 (1978) reached numbers four and one, respectively, on the UK Albums Chart, with both receiving a Platinum certification from the BPI.

The band continued to release recordings after their original run of chart success, with studio albums appearing through Next Chapter in 2016. Their catalogue has also been extensively reissued and compiled, including The Complete Studio Recordings 1973–1988 and The Complete Singles Collection: 1974–1987.

== Albums ==
=== Studio albums ===
| Year | Title | Details | Peak chart positions | Certifications |
| Year | Title | Details | UK | Certifications |
|---|---|---|---|---|
| 1974 | Showaddywaddy | Released: 8 November 1974; Label: Bell; Formats: LP, MC, 8-track | 9 | UK: Silver |
| 1975 | Step Two | Released: 13 June 1975; Label: Bell; Formats: LP, MC, 8-track | 7 | UK: Silver |
| 1976 | Trocadero | Released: 7 May 1976; Label: Bell; Formats: LP, MC, 8-track | 41 | UK: Silver |
| 1977 | Red Star | Released: 11 November 1977; Label: Arista; Formats: LP, MC | 20 | UK: Gold |
| 1979 | Crepes & Drapes | Released: 2 November 1979; Label: Arista; Formats: LP, MC | 8 | UK: Gold |
| 1980 | Bright Lights | Released: 1 December 1980; Label: Arista; Formats: LP, MC | 33 | UK: Silver |
| 1981 | Good Times | Released: 1 October 1981; Label: Bell; Formats: LP, MC | — | |
| 1983 | Living Legends | Released: 17 July 1983; Label: RCA; Formats: LP | — | |
| 1991 | Jump, Boogie & Jive | Released: March 1991; Label: President; Formats: CD, LP | — | |
| 1996 | The One & Only – Greatest & Latest | Released: 1996; Label: CMC; Formats: CD; Re-recordings | — | |
| 2002 | Hey Rock 'n' Roll | Released: 27 May 2002; Label: Ovation; Formats: CD | — | |
| 2006 | I Love Rock 'n' Roll | Released: 12 June 2006; Label: DMG TV; Formats: CD | — | |
| 2008 | The Sun Album (I Betcha Gonna Like It) | Released: 21 April 2008; Label: Voiceprint; Formats: CD | — | |
| 2016 | Next Chapter | Released: 29 July 2016; Label: –; Formats: CD | — | |
| "—" denotes releases that did not chart. | | | | |

=== Live albums ===
| Year | Title | Details |
|---|---|---|
| 2013 | Showaddywaddy Live! | Released: 21 June 2013; Label: –; Formats: CD; Limited release |

=== Compilation albums ===
| Year | Title | Details | Peak chart positions | | | Certifications |
| Year | Title | Details | UK | GER | NL | Certifications |
|---|---|---|---|---|---|---|
| 1976 | Greatest Hits | Released: 6 December 1976; Label: Arista; Formats: LP, MC | 4 | 36 | 9 | UK: Platinum |
| 1977 | Showaddywaddy | Released: November 1977; Label: Music for Pleasure; Formats: LP, MC | — | — | — | |
| 1978 | Greatest Hits 1976–1978 | Released: 24 November 1978; Label: Arista; Formats: LP, MC | 1 | — | — | UK: Platinum |
| 1981 | Rock on with Showaddywaddy | Released: August 1981; Label: Music for Pleasure; Formats: LP, MC | — | — | — | |
| 1981 | The Very Best of Showaddywaddy | Released: October 1981; Label: Arista; Formats: LP, MC | 33 | — | — | UK: Gold |
| 1982 | Showaddywaddy | Released: February 1982; Label: Pickwick; Formats: LP, MC | — | — | — | |
| 1985 | Under the Moon of Love | Released: 1985; Label: Music for Pleasure; Formats: LP, MC | — | — | — | |
| 1987 | The Best Steps to Heaven – Showaddywaddy Hits Collection | Released: November 1987; Label: Tiger; Formats: CD, LP, MC | 90 | — | — | |
| 1987 | Sweet Little Rock 'n' Roller | Released: 1987; Label: The Collection; Formats: CD | — | — | — | |
| 1992 | 20 Greatest Hits | Released: 17 June 1992; Label: Tring; Formats: CD | — | — | — | |
| 1999 | Hey Rock 'N' Roll – The Very Best Of Showaddywaddy | Released: October 1999; Label: Music Club; Formats: CD | — | — | — | |
| 2001 | The Bell Singles 1974–76 | Released: September 2001; Label: 7T's; Formats: CD | — | — | — | |
| 2002 | The Arista Singles Vol. 1 | Released: October 2002; Label: 7T's; Formats: CD | — | — | — | |
| 2004 | The Rock Never Stopped | Released: March 2004; Label: Recall 2cd; Formats: 2xCD | — | — | — | |
| 2004 | Hey Rock 'n' Roll – The Very Best of Showaddywaddy | Released: 15 November 2004; Label: DMG TV; Formats: CD; A deluxe edition was released in 2009 | 56 | — | — | UK: Silver |
| 2011 | 100 Hit Legends | Released: 14 March 2011; Label: 100 Hits; Formats: 5xCD, digital download | — | — | — | |
| 2013 | The Complete Studio Recordings 1973–1988 | Released: 17 June 2013; Label: Edsel; Formats: 10xCD, digital download | — | — | — | |
| 2015 | Greatest | Released: 25 May 2015; Label: Crimson; Formats: CD | — | — | — | |
| 2015 | The Complete Singles Collection: 1974–1987 | Released: 16 October 2015; Label: Edsel; Formats: 33xCD, digital download; 31 CD singles plus 2 greatest hits albums | — | — | — | |
| 2018 | Greatest Hits | Released: 7 September 2018; Label: Demon; Formats: LP | — | — | — | |
| 2019 | Gold | Released: 19 April 2019; Label: Crimson; Formats: 3xCD, LP | 15 | — | — | |
| 2019 | The Studio LP Collection 1974–1983 | Released: 18 October 2019; Label: Demon; Formats: 8xLP | — | — | — | |
| "—" denotes releases that did not chart or were not released | | | | | | |

=== Video albums ===
| Year | Title | Details |
|---|---|---|
| 1987 | The Best Steps to Heaven | Released: 1987; Label: Legend; Formats: VHS |
| 2007 | Rock & Roll Music | Released: 26 March 2007; Label: Cherry Red; Formats: DVD |
| 2008 | Greatest Hits – Live | Released: December 2008; Label: Respect; Formats: DVD |
| 2009 | Live in Germany 1975 | Released: 19 October 2009; Label: Voiceprint; Formats: DVD |

== Singles ==
| Year | Single | Peak chart positions | | | | | | | | | | Certifications | Albums |
| Year | Single | UK | AUS | AUT | BE (FLA) | BE (WA) | GER | IRE | NL | SA | SWI | Certifications | Albums |
|---|---|---|---|---|---|---|---|---|---|---|---|---|---|
| 1974 | "Hey Rock and Roll" | 2 | — | — | — | — | 13 | 5 | — | — | — | UK: Silver | Showaddywaddy |
| 1974 | "Rock 'n' Roll Lady" | 15 | — | — | — | — | — | — | — | — | — | | Showaddywaddy |
| 1974 | "Hey Mister Christmas" | 13 | — | — | — | — | — | 15 | — | — | — | | Non-album single. Re released Nov 2024 for 50th anniversary. No 1 in Vinyl chart |
| 1975 | "Sweet Music" | 14 | — | — | — | — | — | 12 | — | — | — | | Step Two |
| 1975 | "Three Steps to Heaven" | 2 | — | — | — | — | 39 | 1 | — | 6 | — | UK: Silver | Step Two |
| 1975 | "Heartbeat" | 7 | — | — | — | — | 21 | 5 | — | — | — | | Trocadero |
| 1975 | "Heavenly" | 34 | — | — | — | — | 35 | — | — | — | — | | Trocadero |
| 1976 | "Trocadero" | 32 | — | — | — | — | — | — | — | — | — | | Trocadero |
| 1976 | "Take Me in Your Arms" | — | — | — | — | — | — | — | — | — | — | | Trocadero |
| 1976 | "Under the Moon of Love" | 1 | 53 | 5 | 1 | 17 | 4 | 6 | 3 | 6 | 2 | UK: Gold | Greatest Hits |
| 1977 | "When" | 3 | 79 | — | 10 | 34 | 9 | 7 | 10 | — | 7 | UK: Silver | Red Star |
| 1977 | "You Got What It Takes" | 2 | — | — | 29 | — | 28 | 12 | — | — | — | UK: Silver | Red Star |
| 1977 | "Dancin' Party" | 4 | — | — | 28 | — | 30 | 6 | — | — | — | UK: Silver | Red Star |
| 1978 | "I Wonder Why" | 2 | — | — | 17 | — | 20 | 10 | 19 | — | — | UK: Silver | Greatest Hits 1976–1978 |
| 1978 | "A Little Bit of Soap" | 5 | — | — | — | — | 43 | 2 | — | — | — | UK: Silver | Greatest Hits 1976–1978 |
| 1978 | "Pretty Little Angel Eyes" | 5 | — | — | — | — | — | 2 | — | — | — | UK: Silver | Greatest Hits 1976–1978 |
| 1979 | "Remember Then" | 17 | — | — | — | — | 46 | 7 | — | — | — | | Crepes & Drapes |
| 1979 | "Sweet Little Rock 'n' Roller" | 15 | — | — | — | — | — | 9 | — | — | — | | Crepes & Drapes |
| 1979 | "A Night at Daddy Gees" | 39 | — | — | — | — | — | 26 | — | — | — | | Crepes & Drapes |
| 1980 | "Always & Ever" | — | — | — | — | — | 47 | — | — | — | — | | Bright Lights |
| 1980 | "Why Do Lovers Break Each Others Hearts?" | 22 | 83 | — | 22 | — | — | 24 | 16 | — | — | | Bright Lights |
| 1980 | "Blue Moon" | 32 | — | — | — | — | 72 | 27 | — | — | — | | Bright Lights |
| 1981 | "Doo Wah Diddy" | — | — | — | — | — | — | — | — | — | — | | Bright Lights |
| 1981 | "Multiplication" | 39 | — | — | — | — | — | — | — | — | — | | Good Times |
| 1981 | "Footsteps" | 31 | — | — | — | — | — | — | — | — | — | | Good Times |
| 1982 | "Good Timing" | — | — | — | — | — | — | — | — | — | — | | Good Times |
| 1982 | "Who Put the Bomp (in the Bomp-a-Bomp-a-Bomp)" | 37 | — | — | — | — | — | — | — | — | — | | Living Legends |
| 1982 | "Goody Goody" | — | — | — | — | — | — | — | — | — | — | | Living Legends |
| 1983 | "(You're My) Soul and Inspiration" | 103 | — | — | — | — | — | — | — | — | — | | Living Legends |
| 1986 | "Under the Moon of Love" (remix) | — | — | — | — | — | — | — | — | — | — | | Non-album single (Note: This remix was released as a single from a compilation album, Greatest Hits, by label Genie. However, both were withdrawn shortly after release.) |
| 1987 | "Why?" | — | — | — | — | — | — | — | — | — | — | | The Best Steps to Heaven |
| 1990 | "Rockin' and Rollin' with Santa Claus" | — | — | — | — | — | — | — | — | — | — | | Non-album singles |
| 1997 | "Rock Christmas" (Germany promo-only release) | — | — | — | — | — | — | — | — | — | — | | Non-album singles |
| 2006 | "Hey England! (Here We Come Berlin)" | — | — | — | — | — | — | — | — | — | — | | I Love Rock 'n' Roll |
"—" denotes releases that did not chart or were not released in that territory.
