= Red Star (Showaddywaddy album) =

1977 album by Showaddywaddy

Studio album by Showaddywaddy
- Released: 11 November 1977
- Recorded: 1977
- Studios: Rockfield, Rockfield, Monmouthshire; De Lane Lea, London; Olympic, London
- Genres: Rock and roll; doo-wop; pop rock
- Length: 37:30
- Label: Arista
- Producers: Mike Hurst; Showaddywaddy

Showaddywaddy chronology
Trocadero (1976)	Red Star (1977)	Crepes & Drapes (1979)

Singles from Red Star
- 1. "When" Released: 15 April 1977; 2. "You Got What It Takes" Released: 8 July 1977; 3. "Dancin' Party" Released: 14 October 1977

Red Star is the fourth studio album by the British rock and roll band Showaddywaddy. It was released on 11 November 1977 by Arista Records and was the band's first album for the label following the closure of Bell Records. The album reached number 20 on the UK Albums Chart and was certified gold by the British Phonographic Industry (BPI).

The album features a mixture of original compositions and cover versions of 1950s and early 1960s rock and roll and doo-wop songs. It includes three UK Top 10 singles: "When" (number 3), "You Got What It Takes" (number 2) and "Dancin' Party" (number 4).

== Background and release ==
In a departure from previous albums the band produced most of the tracks (11) themselves, with Mike Hurst producing the cover versions "You Got What It Takes" and "When". Additional contributions came from saxophonist Jeff Daly, pedal steel guitarist B. J. Cole (on "In Above Your Head"), string arranger Lynton Knafe, and The Martyn Ford Orchestra. Engineer John Acock also played piano.

Red Star was released during a particularly successful period for Showaddywaddy. Following the number-one success of their 1976 single "Under the Moon of Love", they followed up with three consecutive top-ten singles which the band included on Red Star. The band wrote seven original compositions for the album, combining these with a total of six cover songs.

Unlike their previous studio albums, the front and back cover did not feature any photographs or images of the band members, though the original LP included an inner sleeve containing photographs of the band performing live.

The album's title and sleeve artwork were modelled after the parcel delivery packaging of the British Red Star Parcels railway service, as noted in the news section of Music Week, 12 November 1977. The article discussed the spending plans of record label Arista, these included booking Daily Mirror and Weekend magazine advertisements, which Arista hoped would reach an audience of 10 million readers. The advert, included on page 15 of Music Week depicted a woman holding the album whilst lying on a railway track, with the bottom tag "putting sales back on the rails".

== Critical reception ==
Professional ratings
Review scores
Source	Rating
Music Week	Neutral
The Encyclopedia of Popular Music	2/5 stars
AllMusic	3/5 stars

In a contemporary review published in Music Week on 26 November 1977, Red Star was described as a collection of cheerful interpretations of rock and roll classics, with the magazine highlighting the band’s largely self-produced approach. The review was less enthusiastic about the original compositions, particularly their lyrics, although it suggested that they would appeal to the group’s established fans. It also noted the album's commercial potential, pointing to the inclusion of two top-ten singles and the major promotional support being provided by Arista Records.

In a retrospective review for AllMusic, Dave Thompson praised the band's ability to combine original compositions with covers while maintaining a distinctive sound. He observed that the group's songwriting was sufficiently accomplished to make the distinction between the two difficult to discern, and highlighted the album's balance of nostalgia and contemporary pop appeal. Thompson also recognised the strength of the original material, identifying several compositions as highlights of the collection.

== Track listing ==
All tracks written by Malcolm Allured, Dave Bartram, Romeo Challenger, Rod Deas, Russ Field, Buddy Gask, Al James and Trevor Oakes, except where noted.

Side one
No.	Title	Writer(s)	Length
1.	"Dancin' Party" (Chubby Checker cover)	Dave Appell, Kal Mann	2:43
2.	"'68 Teenage Queen"		2:58
3.	"You Got What It Takes" (Marv Johnson cover)	Berry Gordy, Roquel Davis, Gwen Gordy Fuqua	3:02
4.	"Lucy Jane (Part 2)"		3:28
5.	"In Above Your Head"		2:45
6.	"Sweet Georgia"		2:47

Side two
No.	Title	Writer(s)	Length
7.	"Somethin' Else; Eddie Cochran cover"	Eddie Cochran, Bob Cochran, Sharon Sheeley	2:00
8.	"(You've Got) Personality" (Lloyd Price cover)	Harold Logan, Lloyd Price	3:14
9.	"Feelin'"		3:03
10.	"Listen to Me; Buddy Holly cover"	Buddy Holly, Norman Petty	2:35
11.	"When" (The Kalin Twins cover)	Paul Evans, Jack Reardon	2:51
12.	"Maybe, Maybe, Maybe"		2:58
13.	"Swansong"		3:06
Total length:			37:30

=== 2002 CD reissue bonus tracks ===
The 2002 reissue on 7T's Records (GLAM CD 13) included the following bonus tracks:

1. "Superstar"
2. "Showboat"
3. "One of These Days"
4. "I Wonder Why"
5. "Ever Lovin'"
6. "A Little Bit of Soap"
7. "Pretty Little Angel Eyes"
8. "I'm Yours"

== Personnel ==
Showaddywaddy

- Dave Bartram – vocals
- Buddy Gask – vocals
- Russ Field – guitar
- Trevor Oakes – guitar
- Al James – bass
- Rod Deas – bass
- Malcolm Allured – drums
- Romeo Challenger – drums

Additional musicians

- John Acock – piano, engineer
- Jeff Daly – saxophone
- B. J. Cole – pedal steel guitar on "In Above Your Head"
- The Martyn Ford Orchestra
- Lynton Knafe – string arrangements

Production

- Showaddywaddy – producers (tracks 1, 2, 4–10, 12, 13)
- Mike Hurst – producer (tracks 3, 11)
- Produced for Solid Gold Organisation

== Charts and certifications ==
Chart (1977)	Peak position
UK Albums (Official Charts)	20

Region	Certification	Certified units/sales
United Kingdom (BPI)	Gold	100,000^{^}
^{^} Shipments figures based on certification alone.

== Release history ==
- 11 November 1977 – Original UK LP (Arista SPARTY 1023) and cassette (TCARTY 1023). Released with a printed inner picture sleeve.
- 1988 - Reissued as Step Four (Red Star) (Tiger Records SHOLP 4)
- 2002 – CD reissue with 8 bonus tracks (7T's Records GLAM CD 13)
- 2013 – Included in the box set The Complete Studio Recordings 1973–1988 (Edsel Records SHOBOX40)
