= Trocadero (album) =

1976 album by Showaddywaddy

Studio album by Showaddywaddy
- Released: 7 May 1976
- Recorded: 1975-1976
- Studios: De Lane Lea, London
- Genres: Glam rock; rock and roll; pop rock
- Length: 37:06
- Label: Bell
- Producer: Mike Hurst

Showaddywaddy chronology
Step Two (1975)	Trocadero (1976)	Red Star (1977)

Singles from Trocadero
- 1. "Heartbeat" Released: 22 August 1975; 2. "Heavenly" Released: 7 November 1975; 3. "Trocadero" Released: 30 April 1976; 4. "Take Me in Your Arms" Released: 16 July 1976

Trocadero is the third studio album by English self-proclaimed rock and roll group Showaddywaddy. Released on 7 May 1976 through Bell Records, the album reached number 41 on the UK Albums Chart, spending three weeks on the chart.

The album continues the formula established in their previous records, Showaddywaddy and Step Two, by blending original compositions written by the band members with covers of 1950s and 1960s rock and roll classics.

== Background and composition ==
Released in a gatefold sleeve featuring artwork by Stuart Bodek, Trocadero includes nine original songs alongside three cover versions.

In a contemporary interview, drummer Romeo Challenger explained that the album was named after the Trocadero Ballroom in Leicester, a venue where members of the group had performed before Showaddywaddy was formed. He said the title was chosen because the Trocadero had been a popular venue in Leicester during the 1950s and fitted the group's connection with the music of that period. Challenger went on to say that the album combined old and new material, with the group continuing to play rock and roll while presenting it in a contemporary style.

During this period, the group faced a shifting dynamic regarding their output. While the band preferred writing their own material — such as the title track "Trocadero" — their record label heavily favoured cover tracks due to the massive commercial success of past covers like "Three Steps to Heaven" and "Heartbeat". This was confirmed in a retrospective interview with Mike Hurst who said that after "Rock 'n' Roll Lady" failed to perform as well as their first single, Bell were beginning to lose confidence in the band. However, with the success of "Three Steps to Heaven" the thinking changed because the cover had worked commercially. In a 2023 interview with Vintage Rock, Dave Bartram said that after "Three Steps to Heaven" "you kind of get encouraged by the powers that be into doing more covers."

== Singles ==
Several tracks from the album were released as singles across 1975 and 1976:

- "Heartbeat" was released ahead of the album on 22 August 1975, reaching number 7 in the UK Singles Chart.
- "Heavenly" followed on 7 November 1975, peaking at number 34.
- The title track "Trocadero" was released as a single on 30 April 1976, peaking at number 32 shortly before the album's launch.
- "Take Me in Your Arms" was released on 16 July 1975 but failed to chart.

== Critical reception ==
Professional ratings
Review scores
Source	Rating
Record Mirror	Favourable
The Encyclopedia of Popular Music	2/5 stars
AllMusic	2.5/5 stars

A contemporary review in Record Mirror described Trocadero as a substantial improvement over the group's previous albums, praising it as a more complete album rather than simply a collection of singles and filler material. The review highlighted the group's increased versatility and confidence, noting the combination of original material and rock and roll covers. Particular mention was made of "Lookin' Back", "Record Machine", the title track, Chuck Berry's "Rock and Roll Music", and the heavily produced "Paint Your Picture".

AllMusic critic Richie Unterberger described the album as continuing the musical approach of Showaddywaddy's earlier records, drawing on doo-wop, Buddy Holly-style rock and roll and rockabilly while adding elements of glam rock. He characterised the material as catchy but thought the album was padded out by covers.

== Track listing ==
All tracks written by Buddy Gask, Dave Bartram, Al James, Malcolm Allured, Rod Deas, Romeo Challenger, Russ Field, and Trevor Oakes, except where noted.

Side one
No.	Title	Writer(s)	Length
1.	"Trocadero"		3:20
2.	"Lookin' Back"		3:29
3.	"Paint Your Picture"		3:59
4.	"Say Mama" (Gene Vincent cover)	Johnny Earl, John Meeks	2:13
5.	"Go Johnny Go"		2:14
6.	"Heavenly"		3:00

Side two
No.	Title	Writer(s)	Length
1.	"Rock and Roll Music" (Chuck Berry cover)	Chuck Berry	2:52
2.	"Record Machine"		3:39
3.	"Take Me in Your Arms"		2:41
4.	"Heartbeat" (Buddy Holly cover)	Bob Montgomery, Norman Petty	2:51
5.	"Sweet and Innocent You"		3:07
6.	"The Young Indian Brave"		3:41
Total length:			37:06

=== 2001 CD reissue bonus tracks ===
The 2001 reissue on 7T’s Records (GLAM CD 10) included the following bonus tracks, 1 and 2 written by Showaddywaddy, 3 written by Curtis Lee and Tommy Boyce.

1. "Lucy Jane" (first released on b-side of "Heartbeat")
2. "Teenage Love Affair" (first released on b-side of "Trocadero")
3. "Under the Moon of Love" (first released as a single 15 October 1976)

== Personnel ==
- Dave Bartram – vocals
- Buddy Gask – vocals
- Russ Field – guitar
- Trevor Oakes – guitar
- Al James – bass
- Rod Deas – bass
- Malcolm Allured – drums
- Romeo Challenger – drums

== Charts ==
Chart (1976)	Peak position
UK Albums (Official Charts)	41

== Certifications ==
Region	Certification	Certified units/sales
United Kingdom (BPI)	Silver	60,000^{^}
^{^} Shipments figures based on certification alone.

== Release history ==
- 7 May 1976 – Original UK LP (SYBEL 8003) and cassette (TC BELL 8003)
- 1988 - Reissued as Step Three (Trocadero) (Tiger Records SHOLP 3)
- 2001 – CD reissue with 3 bonus tracks (7T's Records GLAM CD 10)
- 2013 – Included in the box set The Complete Studio Recordings 1973–1988 (Edsel Records SHOBOX40)
