= Sweet Music (Showaddywaddy song) =

Single by Showaddywaddy

from the album Step Two
- B-side: "Windows"
- Released: 7 February 1975
- Genre: Rock and roll
- Length: 2:55
- Label: Bell Records
- Songwriters: Allured, Gask, Bartram, Field, Deas, Challenger, James, Oakes
- Producer: Mike Hurst

Showaddywaddy singles chronology
"Hey Mister Christmas" (1974)	"Sweet Music" (1975)	"Three Steps to Heaven" (1975)

"Sweet Music" is a song by the English rock and roll revival band Showaddywaddy, released as a single by Bell Records in February 1975. It was backed by "Windows", a song previously included on the band's 1974 debut album. "Sweet Music" reached number 14 on the UK Singles Chart, and number 12 on the Irish Singles Chart.

== Background and release ==
Following the success of their first three singles, Showaddywaddy released "Sweet Music" on Bell Records. In a 2004 question-and-answer session, lead singer Dave Bartram recalled that the record company had wanted the band to release "Don't Turn Your Back on Me Baby" as a single. Some members of the group disagreed with the choice, and the band instead recorded "Sweet Music".

The song was subsequently included on the band's second studio album, Step Two, released in June 1975.

== Promotion ==
The single was promoted in a half page advert of Record Mirror featuring an image of the band on a sweet jar. There was also a full page advert in Music Week.

The band performed the song twice on Top of the Pops during February 1975, the song was played a third time on the show in March but just featured the audience dancing.

== Chart performance ==
"Sweet Music" entered the UK Singles Chart in February 1975. It reached number 14 on 22 March and remained in the chart for nine weeks, through to April 1975.

== Critical reception ==
In a review published in Record Mirror on 15 February 1975, Sue Byrom described Showaddywaddy's “Sweet Music” as a “stomper”, noting its use of a real 1950s-style bass sound and riffs. She praised the single's authenticity, concluding that it “should do well for them”.

== Personnel ==
- Dave Bartram – lead vocals
- Rod Deas – bass
- Romeo Challenger – drums
- Malcolm Allured – drums
- Russ Field – guitars
- Trevor Oakes – guitars
- Buddy Gask – vocals
- Al James – vocals

Production

- Mike Hurst – producer
- Dave Hunt – engineer

== Charts ==
Chart (1975)	Peak position
Ireland (IRMA)	12
UK Singles (OCC)	14
