= Hey Mister Christmas =

Single by Showaddywaddy
- B-side: "Rock 'n' Roll Man"
- Released: 15 November 1974
- Studio: De Lane Lea Studios Music Centre, Wembley, London
- Genre: Rock and roll, Christmas music
- Length: 3:40
- Label: Bell
- Songwriters: Allured, Gask, Bartram, Field, Deas, Challenger, James, Oakes
- Producer: Mike Hurst

Showaddywaddy singles chronology
"Rock 'n' Roll Lady" (1974)	"Hey Mister Christmas" (1974)	"Sweet Music" (1975)

"Hey Mister Christmas" is a song by English rock and roll band Showaddywaddy. It was released as a non-album single by Bell Records on 15 November 1974, with "Rock 'n' Roll Man" on the b-side. The track features backing vocals from members of the National Children's Home choir from Harpenden.

The song reached number 13 on the UK Singles Chart, and number 15 on the Irish Singles Chart.

== Background and release ==
During the recording sessions, a group of young girls from The National Children's Home at Harpenden were touring the studio complex. After meeting the band, the girls were invited to record backing vocals for the song, adding a traditional children's choir element to the festive rock track.

The single was released without a picture sleeve in the United Kingdom, although picture sleeves were issued in Germany, Belgium and the Netherlands.

The song was reissued as a special picture disc on 1 November 2024 by Demon Music Group under catalogue number DEMSING057 to mark the song's 50th anniversary.

== Chart performance ==
The single spent eight weeks on the UK Singles Chart between November 1974 and January 1975, reaching its peak position on 29 December.

The anniversary issue achieved significant physical sales, peaking at number 2 on the UK Physical Singles Chart and reaching number 1 on the UK Vinyl Singles Chart on 14 November 2024.

A 2011 Channel 5 programme about festive songs ranked "Hey Mister Christmas" as the 42nd most popular Christmas song of all time in the UK.

== Promotion and television appearances ==
The single was promoted in a half page advert of Record Mirror featuring an image of the band dressed in christmas suits. The same issue ran a competition in which the single was part of the prize bundle.

Showaddywaddy performed the song on three television programmes in December 1974:

- Top of the Pops (BBC) – 12 December 1974
- Lift Off with Ayshea (ITV) – 17 December 1974 episode 144
- A Stocking Full of Stars (BBC) – broadcast on Christmas Day 1974

== Critical reception ==
In a contemporary review of Christmas singles, Sue Byrom of Record Mirror described Showaddywaddy’s recording as "quite jolly", noting its backing by the National Children’s Home in Harpenden. She also praised its bells and steady drum beat, which she felt helped maintain the song’s festive atmosphere.

== Personnel ==
- Dave Bartram – lead vocals, piano
- Rod Deas – bass
- Romeo Challenger – drums
- Malcolm Allured – drums
- Russ Field – guitars
- Trevor Oakes – guitars
- Buddy Gask – vocals
- Al James – vocals
- National Children's Home Choir, Harpenden – backing vocals
- Mike Hurst – producer
- Dave Hunt – engineer

== Charts ==
Chart (1974–1975)	Peak position
Ireland (IRMA)	15
UK Singles (OCC)	13
Chart (2024)	Peak position
UK Vinyl Singles (OCC)	1
UK Physical Singles (OCC)	2
