= Rock 'n' Roll Lady =

Single by Showaddywaddy

from the album Showaddywaddy
- B-side: "I'm a Traveller"
- Released: 2 August 1974
- Recorded: De Lane Lea Studios Music Centre, Wembley, London
- Genre: Rock and roll
- Length: 3:34
- Label: Bell
- Songwriters: Allured, Gask, Bartram, Field, Deas, Challenger, Betts, Oakes
- Producer: Mike Hurst

Showaddywaddy singles chronology
"Hey Rock and Roll" (1974)	"Rock 'n' Roll Lady" (1974)	"Hey Mister Christmas" (1974)

"Rock 'n' Roll Lady" is a song by English rock and roll revival group Showaddywaddy, released as a single on 2 August 1974 by Bell. It was the group's second single, following "Hey Rock ‘n’ Roll". The track reached number 15 on the UK Singles Chart, and was subsequently included on the band's self-titled debut album, released in November 1974.

== Background and recording ==
The song was recorded at the De Lane Lea Studios Music Centre in Wembley, London. Writing on the album notes to The Ultimate Collection released in 2019 Dave Bartram said the band sought to achieve a guitar sound inspired by American guitarist Duane Eddy:

"We had a thing at the time about the Duane Eddy guitar sound which we tried to get on this track. It was the first time I really saw the band growing creatively in the studio."

The recording features lead vocals by Buddy Gask, with Bartram joining him in the chorus. The single was produced by Mike Hurst.

== Release and chart performance ==
Released by Bell Records, "Rock 'n' Roll Lady" was backed with "I'm a Traveller", a song originally recorded by Choise, one of the groups whose members later formed Showaddywaddy.

The single entered the UK singles chart on 17 August 1974, reaching its peak position of number 15 on 7 September. It spent nine weeks on the chart. Its chart run overlapped with that of the group's debut single, "Hey Rock and Roll".

== Television performances ==
Showaddywaddy promoted the single via extensive television appearances in the second half of 1974. Top of the Pops saw two appearances, the first on 22 August, and then repeated on 29 August. The song was one of the three the band played on Granada TV’s 45, episode 13, broadcast 24 September 1974. Episode two of The Geordie Scene featured the band playing "Rock 'n' Roll Lady" as part of a three part set. ITV network program Lift Off featured Showaddywaddy playing the song on 10 September 1974.

== Personnel ==
- Dave Bartram – lead vocals
- Buddy Gask – lead vocals
- Russ Field – guitar
- Trevor Oakes – guitar
- Al James – bass guitar
- Rod Deas – bass guitar
- Malcolm Allured – drums
- Romeo Challenger – drums

Production

- Mike Hurst – producer
- Dave Hunt – engineer

== Chart performance ==
Chart (1974)	Peak position
UK Singles Chart	15
