= Hey Rock and Roll =

Single by Showaddywaddy

from the album Showaddywaddy
- B-side: "King of the Jive"
- Released: 19 April 1974
- Recorded: April 1974
- Studio: De Lane Lea Studios Music Centre, Wembley, London
- Genre: Glam rock, rock and roll
- Length: 3:24
- Label: Bell
- Songwriters: Dave Bartram, Trevor Oakes
- Producer: Mike Hurst

Showaddywaddy singles chronology
"Hey Rock and Roll" (1974)	"Rock 'n' Roll Lady" (1974)

"Hey Rock and Roll" is the debut single by English glam rock group Showaddywaddy, released 19 April 1974 through Bell Records from their self-titled debut album. Written by band members Dave Bartram and Trevor Oakes, it became a major commercial success, peaking at number 2 on the UK Singles Chart, and starting a streak of 8 consecutive UK Top 40 hits.

== Background and composition ==
Showaddywaddy originally formed in Leicester in 1973 through the amalgamation of two local bands, Choise and The Golden Hammers. After achieving national exposure as runners-up on the ATV talent show New Faces in December 1973, they signed a recording contract with Bell Records.

While the group later become heavily associated with covering 1950s rock classics, their debut single was an entirely original song tracking the revival movement. The track was primarily written by lead vocalist Dave Bartram and rhythm guitarist Trevor Oakes, though songwriting royalties were officially split equally across all eight members of the band.

== Television performances ==
The single's chart ascent was heavily assisted by the group's highly energetic television appearances. Showaddywaddy made their debut on the BBC's Top of the Pops on 23 May 1974. Dressed in their trademark, brightly coloured draped Teddy Boy suits, their visual routine—which featured synchronized dance steps and comedic choreography from co-drummer Malcolm Allured—established the band's long-running TV identity. The performance was repeated the following week, then the band were invited back to perform the song again on 13 June 1974.

== Chart performance ==
"Hey Rock and Roll" entered the UK Singles Chart in May 1974. It embarked on a 14-week chart run, eventually reaching its peak position of number 2 in June, where it spent a total of six weeks inside the Top 10. The single earned a Silver certification from the BPI for sales exceeding 250,000 copies. Internationally, the single also performed well, peaking at number 5 on the Irish Singles Chart and number 13 on the West German charts.

== Personnel ==
All eight band members received writing credits:

- Buddy Gask – lead vocals
- Dave Bartram – spoken introduction, backing vocals
- Russ Field – lead guitar
- Trevor Oakes – rhythm guitar
- Al James – bass guitar
- Rod Deas – bass guitar
- Romeo Challenger – drums, percussion
- Malcolm Allured – drums, chorus vocals

== Charts ==
Chart (1974)	Peak position
West Germany (GfK Entertainment charts)	13
Ireland (Irish Singles Chart)	5
UK Singles Chart (Official Charts Company)	2

== Certifications ==
Region	Certification	Certified units/sales
United Kingdom (BPI)	Silver	250,000^{^}
^{^} Shipments figures based on certification alone.
