= Good Times (Showaddywaddy album) =

Studio album by Showaddywaddy
- Released: 1 October 1981
- Recorded: 1981
- Genres: pop rock, rock and roll
- Length: 38:14
- Label: Bell
- Producer: Showaddywaddy

Showaddywaddy chronology
Bright Lights (1980)	Good Times (1981)	Living Legends (1983)

Singles from Good Times
- 1. "Multiplication" Released: 5 June 1981; 2. "Footsteps" Released: 6 November 1981; 3. "Good Timing" Released: 19 February 1982

Good Times is the seventh studio album by English rock and roll band Showaddywaddy. It was released on 1 October 1981 by Bell Records, which had been temporarily revived by its parent company Arista Records that year. The album was the band’s first studio album not to enter the UK Albums Chart. It was preceded by the band's 1980 album Bright Lights and followed by Living Legends in 1983.

== Background ==
Following the commercial success of Showaddywaddy's albums during the 1970s, the band's chart performance began to decline at the beginning of the 1980s. Bright Lights, released in December 1980, reached number 33 on the UK Albums Chart, but Good Times became the band's first studio album not to chart.

The release of Bright Lights had been supported by a major marketing campaign from Arista Records, covering tv, radio, music press, and store displays. Good Times had none of this, the British music press ignored the album on release week, there were no adverts, no articles, no interviews and no reviews. Promotion instead centred on television appearances for the album's singles and the band's extensive live schedule during 1981 where they performed over 100 concerts.

== Release ==
Good Times was released on 1 October 1981 on Bell Records, with the catalogue number BELLS 271 on LP and TC-BEL 271 on cassette. Bell had originally been discontinued by Arista in 1976 but was temporarily revived in 1981.

Good Times continued the band's established combination of original material and covers of rock and roll and pop songs from the 1950s and 1960s. It contains five original compositions and eight cover versions. The album included recordings of songs that had been part of the band's repertoire for some time. "Weekend", for example, had been performed by Showaddywaddy during their early years between 1973 and 1975, but was not recorded by the band until the sessions for Good Times.

Arista promoted Showaddywaddy's first single from the album, "Multiplication", with a full-page advertisement in Music Week dated 30 May 1981. The advertisement highlighted the band's forthcoming television appearances, including a BBC One Showaddywaddy television special, Cheggers Plays Pop and Razzmatazz (British TV series).

The second single, "Footsteps" received further television exposure, including an appearance on Top of the Pops. It also received contemporary trade-press coverage, appearing in Music Week in November 1981. Smash Hits subsequently printed the lyrics to the song in its 24 December 1981 issue.

== Singles ==
Three singles were released from the album between 1981 and 1982:

- "Multiplication" (a cover of the Bobby Darin song) was issued ahead of the album on 5 June 1981, peaking at number 39 on the UK Singles Chart.
- "Footsteps", a cover of the Steve Lawrence song, followed on 6 November 1981, becoming the most successful single from the album by reaching number 31.
- "Good Timing", a cover of the Jimmy Jones song, was released as the final single on 19 February 1982, but failed to chart.

== Critical reception ==
Professional ratings
Review scores
Source	Rating
AllMusic	2/5 stars
Encyclopedia of Popular Music	2/5 stars

Retrospectively, Tim Sendra of AllMusic gave Good Times a negative assessment, arguing that Showaddywaddy's original rock-and-roll revivalist energy had largely been replaced by smoother, more overtly showbiz-oriented material. He criticised the album's selection of covers, including "Alley Oop", "C'mon Everybody" and "Shake", which he considered lacking the vitality of the originals. Sendra regarded the band's version of The Easybeats' "Good Times" as the strongest of the covers, although he felt its performance was undermined by heavy-handed playing. He was similarly critical of the original material and its production, concluding that the album represented a significant decline from the band's earlier work.

== Track listing ==
All tracks credited as Showaddywaddy written by Malcolm Allured, Dave Bartram, Romeo Challenger, Rod Deas, Russ Field, Buddy Gask, Al James and Trevor Oakes. Track lengths via Discogs.

Side one
No.	Title	Writer(s)	Length
1.	"Multiplication" (Bobby Darin cover)	Bobby Darin	2:46
2.	"Pretty Little One"	Showaddywaddy	3:38
3.	"Alley Oop" (The Hollywood Argyles cover)	Dallas Frazier	3:32
4.	"Footsteps" (Steve Lawrence cover )	Barry Mann, Hank Hunter	2:17
5.	"Gypsy Rose Lee"	Showaddywaddy	2:51
6.	"Good Timing" (Jimmy Jones cover )	Fred Tobias, Clint Ballard Jr.	2:10
7.	"Party Time"	Showaddywaddy	3:00

Side two
No.	Title	Writer(s)	Length
8.	"Shake" (Sam Cooke cover )	Sam Cooke	2:39
9.	"C'mon Everybody" (Eddie Cochran cover )	Eddie Cochran, Jerry Capehart	2:01
10.	"You Always Stand Me Up"	Showaddywaddy	3:13
11.	"Weekend" (Eddie Cochran cover )	Bill Post, Doree Post	3:13
12.	"I Don't Like Rock 'n' Roll No More"	Showaddywaddy	3:23
13.	"Good Times" (The Easybeats cover )	George Young (rock musician), Harry Vanda	3:31
Total length:			38:14

=== 2005 CD reissue bonus tracks ===
The 2005 reissue on 7T's Records (GLAM CD 20) included the following bonus tracks, both written by Showaddywaddy:

1. "I Wish That I Could Undo All the Bad Things That I Have Done" (first released as the B-side to "Multiplication")
2. "Tribute" (first released on b-side of “Footsteps”)

== Personnel ==
Showaddywaddy

- Dave Bartram – vocals
- Buddy Gask – vocals
- Russ Field – guitars
- Trevor Oakes – guitars
- Rod Deas – bass guitar
- Al James – bass guitar
- Malcolm Allured – drums
- Romeo Challenger – drums

Production

- Showaddywaddy – producers (except tracks 1, & 3)
- Phil Wainman - producer (tracks 1, & 3)
- Peter Mill/MTI London - sleeve art direction & design
- Bob Marchant - Neon photography
- Michael Putland - group photography

== Release history ==
- 1 October 1981 – Original UK LP (BELLS 271) and cassette (TC-BEL 271).
- 1988 - Reissued as Step Seven (Good Times) (Tiger Records SHOLP 7)
- 2005 – CD reissue with 2 bonus tracks (7T's Records GLAM CD 20)
- 2013 – Included in the box set The Complete Studio Recordings 1973–1988 (Edsel Records SHOBOX40)
