= Step Two =

1975 album by Showaddywaddy

Studio album by Showaddywaddy
- Released: 13 June 1975
- Recorded: 1975
- Studios: De Lane Lea, London
- Genres: Pop rock; glam rock; rock and roll
- Length: 35:10
- Label: Bell
- Producer: Mike Hurst

Showaddywaddy chronology
Showaddywaddy (1974)	Step Two (1975)	Trocadero (1976)

Singles from Step Two
- 1. "Sweet Music" Released: 7 February 1975; 2. "Three Steps to Heaven" Released: 19 April 1975

Step Two is the second studio album by the English glam rock group Showaddywaddy. Released on 13 June 1975 through Bell Records, the album reached number 7 on the UK Albums Chart. It followed the formula of their self-titled debut album by featuring a blend of original compositions written by the band members alongside covers of 1950s and 1960s rock and roll classics.

== Background and commercial success ==
Following the commercial breakthrough of their debut album in 1974, Step Two cemented Showaddywaddy's position as a regular chart act in the mid-1970s.

In a 1975 interview with Sounds magazine, Trevor Oakes stated that Step Two was a big improvement on their first album, saying it was "more of a whole, more of an album." Dave Bartram said they had spent more time on this album, particularly in arranging the songs to get the best out of them and give them the distinctive Showaddwaddy sound. They also hired session musicians to add some brass and strings.

The album produced two UK hit singles. The first, "Sweet Music" (an original band composition), reached number 14 on the UK Singles Chart. The second, a cover of Eddie Cochran's "Three Steps to Heaven", became a massive hit for the band, climbing to number 2 in the UK and topping the charts in Ireland.

== Critical reception ==
Professional ratings
Review scores
Source	Rating
Record Mirror	Critical
Disc	3/5 stars
Music Week	Chart Certainty
The Encyclopedia of Popular Music	3/5 stars
AllMusic	3/5 stars

Contemporary reviews of Step Two were mixed. Record Mirror criticised the album's lack of consistency and argued that Showaddywaddy's original songs generally lacked the punch of the older material, with the exception of "Sweet Music". The review noted that although Showaddywaddy were an extremely good stage act, the same excitement did not translate to record, leaving the listener "in a bit of a limbo".

Disc was more favourable, describing the album as straightforward pop and praising the group's catchy approach and distinctive rock-and-roll sound. The review highlighted "Big Big Star" and "The Latest Craze" as upbeat tracks likely to be played at parties, but felt that slower songs such as "Three Stars / Rave On" did not reach the same standard. The album received a two-star rating (they had a five tier system, two stars was the middle rating), classified as "Good".

Music Week similarly noted the commercial potential of the album following the success of "Three Steps to Heaven", predicting heavy sales. However, the review considered Showaddywaddy's original compositions "strangely lustreless" compared with the 1950s rock-and-roll songs "Three Steps", "Rave On" and "Chain Gang". It concluded that the group's popularity made the album's limited musical ambitions less important in terms of its sales appeal.

== Track listing ==
All tracks are written by Buddy Gask, Al James, Romeo Challenger, Dave Bartram, Russ Field, Rod Deas, Trevor Oakes, and Malcolm Allured, except where noted.

Side one
No.	Title	Writer(s)	Length
1.	"Three Steps to Heaven"	Eddie Cochran, Bob Cochran	2:56
2.	"If You Know What I Mean"		3:06
3.	"Sing On Louise"		3:20
4.	"Big Big Star"		2:50
5.	"Chain Gang"	Sam Cooke	3:13
6.	"Blue Jean Baby"		2:56

Side two
No.	Title	Writer(s)	Length
1.	"Three Stars / Rave On"	Tommy Dee / Sonny West, Bill Tilghman, Norman Petty	3:02
2.	"The Latest Craze"		2:56
3.	"Smiling Eyes"		2:57
4.	"Rocker Boots"		2:22
5.	"Sweet Music"		2:57
6.	"Everybody On Your Feet"		2:35
Total length:			35:10

=== 2001 CD reissue bonus tracks ===
The 2001 reissue on 7T’s Records (GLAM CD 4) included the following bonus tracks, both written by Showaddywaddy:

1. "Hey Mister Christmas" (first released as a (non-album) single 15 November 1974)
2. "Rock 'n' Roll Man" (first released on b-side of "Hey Mister Christmas")

== Personnel ==
- Dave Bartram – lead vocals
- Buddy Gask – lead vocals
- Russ Field – guitar
- Trevor Oakes – guitar
- Al James – bass guitar
- Rod Deas – bass guitar
- Malcolm Allured – drums
- Romeo Challenger – drums

Production

- Mike Hurst – producer
- Dave Hunt – engineer

== Charts ==
Chart (1975)	Peak position
UK Albums (Official Charts)	7

== Certifications ==
Region	Certification	Certified units/sales
United Kingdom (BPI)	Silver	60,000^{^}
^{^} Shipments figures based on certification alone.

== Release history ==
- 13 June 1975 – Original UK LP (BELLS 256) and cassette (TC-BEL 256).
- 1988 - Reissued as Step Two (Step Two) (Tiger Records SHOLP 2)
- 2001 – CD reissue with 2 bonus tracks (7T's Records GLAM CD 4)
- 2013 – Included in the box set The Complete Studio Recordings 1973–1988 (Edsel Records SHOBOX40)
