= Kinda Folksy =

Studio album by The Springfields
- Released: 1962
- Recorded: 1960–61
- Genre: Pop, folk
- Label: Philips
- Producer: Johnny Franz

The Springfields chronology
Kinda Folksy (1962)	Sliver Theard and Golden Needles (1966)

Kinda Folksy is the debut album by vocal-trio The Springfields. It was directed by Ivor Raymonde.

== Track listing ==
1. "Wimoweh Mambo" (Paul Campbell, Solomon Linda) - 1:55
2. "The Black Hills of Dakota" (Paul Francis Webster, Sammy Fain) - 2:25
3. "Row, Row, Row" (James V. Monaco, William Jerome) - 2:10
4. "The Green Leaves of Summer" (Dimitri Tiomkin, Paul Francis Webster) - 2:15
5. "Silver Dollar" (Clarke Van Ness, Jack Palmer) - 2:08
6. "Allentown Jail" (Irving Gordon) - 2:35
7. "Lonesome Traveller" (Traditional; arranged by Lee Hays) - 1:40
8. "Dear Hearts And Gentle People" (Bob Hilliard, Sammy Fain) - 3:00
9. "They Took John Away" (Bobby Sharp) - 2:15
10. "Eso Es El Amor" (Pepe Iglesias; English lyrics: Sunny Skylar) - 2:05
11. "Two Brothers" (Irving Gordon) - 2:35
12. "Tzena, Tzena, Tzena" (Issachar Miron, Julius Grossman, Mitchell Parish) - 2:14

== Personnel ==
The Springfields

- Dusty Springfield - vocals
- Tom Springfield - guitar, vocals
- Mike Hurst - guitar, vocals

with:

- Ivor Raymonde - accompaniment director
