= Crepes & Drapes =

1979 album by Showaddywaddy

Studio album by Showaddywaddy
- Released: 2 November 1979
- Recorded: 1979
- Studios: Rockfield, Wales
- Genres: Rock and roll; doo-wop; pop rock
- Length: 34:51
- Label: Arista
- Producer: Showaddywaddy

Showaddywaddy chronology
Red Star (1977)	Crepes & Drapes (1979)	Bright Lights (1980)

Singles from Crepes & Drapes
- 1. "Remember Then" Released: 16 March 1979; 2. "Sweet Little Rock 'n' Roller" Released: 26 June 1979; 3. "A Night at Daddy Gee's" Released: 19 October 1979

Crepes & Drapes is the fifth studio album by English rock and roll group Showaddywaddy. It was released on 2 November 1979 through Arista Records. Arista promoted the album with a national advertising campaign that included television commercials, colour window displays and in-store posters. The album entered the UK Albums Chart at number 75 on 4 November 1979 and subsequently reached a peak position of number 8. It received a gold certification from the BPI on 13 December 1979.

== Background and packaging ==
The album's title is a reference to the traditional "crepe" shoes and "drape" jackets popularized by the Teddy Boy subculture, which was central to Showaddywaddy's visual image.

The original UK vinyl release was issued in a distinctive textured and embossed picture sleeve. The original photography was by John Langham, this was adapted into the final sleeve design by Bob Searles.

Musically, the record featured more cover songs than previous albums with eight covers of rock and roll classics alongside four original compositions written by the band members. Building from their previous outing Red Star, Crepes & Drapes was entirely self-produced by the group.

== Singles ==
Three singles were lifted from the album across 1979:

- "Remember Then" (originally recorded by the Earls) was released in February 1979 and reached number 17 on the UK Singles Chart.
- "Sweet Little Rock 'n' Roller" (a Joe Dolan cover) followed in July 1979, peaking at number 15.
- "A Night at Daddy Gee's" (a Curtis Lee cover) was issued in November 1979 to coincide with the album launch, peaking at number 39.

== Critical reception ==
Professional ratings
Review scores
Source	Rating
Record Mirror	2/5 stars
Music Week	Positive
AllMusic	3/5 stars
The Encyclopedia of Popular Music	3/5 stars

A very brief review in Music Week two weeks after release described the album as "a rollicking good bunch of tracks." Another contemporary review, by Record Mirror's Peter Coyne, was considerably less favourable. Coyne argued that although the album had the characteristics of a greatest-hits collection, its performances relied heavily on familiar Showaddywaddy formulas and criticised what they regarded as the band's treatment of classic rock and roll material.

Dave Thompson of AllMusic described Crepes & Drapes as an example of Showaddywaddy's continued adherence to their rock and roll revival style, noting that by 1979 the group had moved considerably beyond their original association with the glam rock scene. He characterised the band as anachronistic but influential on contemporary rock and roll revival acts, citing Darts and Rocky Sharpe and the Replays as examples of groups who were also achieving chart success during the revival.

== Track listing ==
All tracks written by Malcolm Allured, Dave Bartram, Romeo Challenger, Rod Deas, Russ Field, Buddy Gask, Al James and Trevor Oakes, except where noted.

Side one
No.	Title	Writer(s)	Length
1.	"Sweet Little Rock 'n' Roller" (Joe Dolan cover)	Howdar, Peter Yellowstone, Roberto Danova	3:27
2.	"Sea Cruise" (Huey "Piano" Smith and His Clowns cover)	Huey "Piano" Smith	2:53
3.	"Just a Country Boy" (Frankie Allen cover)	John Allen	3:16
4.	"Lost"		3:32
5.	"That’s Rock and Roll" (Eric Carmen cover)	Eric Carmen	3:33
6.	"Twist and Shout" (The Top Notes cover)	Phil Medley, Bert Berns	2:34

Side two
No.	Title	Writer(s)	Length
7.	"A Night at Daddy Gee's" (Curtis Lee cover)	Tommy Boyce, Curtis Lee	2:45
8.	"Come On Let's Go" (Ritchie Valens cover)	Ritchie Valens	2:10
9.	"That's Alright with Me"		3:15
10.	"I Appreciate the Job"		2:24
11.	"Win Your Heart"		2:31
12.	"Remember Then" (The Earls cover)	Tony Powers, Beverly Ross	2:31
Total length:			34:51

=== 2002 CD reissue bonus tracks ===
The 2002 reissue on 7T’s Records (GLAM CD 15) included the following bonus tracks, both written by Showaddywaddy:

1. "Five Minutes More" (first released on b-side of "Sweet Little Rock ‘n’ Roller")
2. "Love for a Star" (first released on b-side of "Remember Then")

== Personnel ==
Showaddwaddy

- Dave Bartram – lead vocals
- Buddy Gask – lead vocals
- Russ Field – guitars
- Trevor Oakes – guitars
- Rod Deas – bass guitar
- Al James – bass guitar
- Malcolm Allured – drums
- Romeo Challenger – drums

Technical

- John Acock - engineer
- Showaddywaddy - producer
- Bob Searles - sleeve design

== Charts ==
Chart (1979)	Peak position
UK Albums (Official Charts)	8

== Certifications ==
Region	Certification	Certified units/sales
United Kingdom (BPI)	Gold	100,000^{^}
^{^} Shipments figures based on certification alone.

== Release history ==
- 2 November 1979 – Original UK LP (Arista ARTV 3) and cassette (ARTVC 3)
- 1988 - Reissued as Step Five (Crepes and Drapes) (Tiger Records SHOLP 5)
- 2003 – CD reissue with 2 bonus tracks (7T's Records GLAM CD 15)
- 2013 – Included in the box set The Complete Studio Recordings 1973–1988 (Edsel Records SHOBOX40)
