= Bright Lights (Showaddywaddy album) =

1980 album by Showaddywaddy

Studio album by Showaddywaddy
- Released: 1 December 1980
- Recorded: 1980
- Studios: Windmill Lane, Dublin
- Genres: Pop rock; rock and roll; doo-wop
- Length: 30:49
- Label: Arista
- Producer: Showaddywaddy

Showaddywaddy chronology
Crepes & Drapes (1979)	Bright Lights (1980)	Good Times (1981)

Singles from Bright Lights
- 1. "Always and Ever" Released: 18 April 1980; 2. "Why Do Lovers Break Each Other's Hearts?" Released: 12 September 1980; 3. "Blue Moon" Released: 1 December 1980; 4. "Doo Wah Diddy" Released: 12 February 1981

Bright Lights is the sixth studio album by English rock and roll group Showaddywaddy. It was released on 1 December 1980 through Arista Records under the catalogue number SPART 1142, with a cassette edition issued as TCART 1142. The album peaked at number 33 on the UK Albums Chart and earned a silver certification from the BPI.

== Background and release ==
Following the commercial success of Crepes & Drapes, Bright Lights features the band's established configuration of blending rock and roll cover versions with original songs written by the band members. Out of the 12 total tracks, the album contains seven cover versions and five original compositions.

Arista mounted a substantial promotional campaign for the album. Music Week reported in October 1980 that the release would be supported by national press advertising, nationally distributed Independent Local Radio commercials and in-store promotional material. A subsequent Arista advertisement described a television campaign covering the English Midlands and North West, radio promotion and extensive point-of-sale displays, as well as appearances by Showaddywaddy on television programmes.

== Singles ==
Four singles were released from the album, two prior to the album release, one on album release day, and one several months after.

- "Always and Ever" (backed with "Cool Cool Cat") was issued in April 1980. It failed to chart in the UK, but did reach number 47 in the German charts.
- "Why Do Lovers Break Each Other's Hearts?" (backed with "Teen Canteen"), a cover of the 1962 song by Bob B. Soxx & the Blue Jeans (written by Ellie Greenwich, Phil Spector and Tony Powers), was released in September 1980 and peaked at number 22 on the UK Singles Chart, spending 10 weeks on the chart.
- "Blue Moon" (backed with "Really Goin' Out of My Mind"), a cover of the Rodgers and Hart standard, was released in December 1980, on the same day as the album, and reached number 32 on the UK Singles Chart, spending nine weeks on the chart.
- "Doo Wah Diddy" (backed with "You Are Love") was released in February 1981 but did not chart.

== Critical reception ==
Professional ratings
Review scores
Source	Rating
Record Business	3/5 stars
Smash Hits	5/10 stars
New Musical Express	Negative
AllMusic	2.5/5 stars

Contemporary reviews of Bright Lights were mixed to negative. Record Business awarded the album three stars, noting Showaddywaddy's resurgence in popularity and describing "Blue Moon" as their most commercial single for some time.

In Smash Hits, Beverly Hillier gave the album 5 out of 10. She criticised the band's continued reliance on reworked versions of 1950s and early 1960s hits, arguing that the album offered little that was new, although she noted that it contained both cover versions and self-penned material. She described the result as the group's familiar, watered-down rock and roll sound.

New Musical Express was considerably more negative. Reviewing the album, Paul Du Noyer wrote that "Doo Wah Diddy" and "This Silver Is Removable" were the only tracks he regarded favourably, while dismissing the remainder as characteristic of Showaddywaddy's established sound. He criticised the group's promotional claims and portrayed the album as an example of a commercial formula based on encouraging listeners to buy familiar material.

== Track listing ==
All tracks credited as Showaddywaddy written by Malcolm Allured, Dave Bartram, Romeo Challenger, Rod Deas, Russ Field, Buddy Gask, Al James and Trevor Oakes.

Side one
No.	Title	Writer(s)	Length
1.	"Why Do Lovers Break Each Other's Hearts?" (Bob B. Soxx & the Blue Jeans cover)	Phil Spector, Ellie Greenwich, Tony Powers	2:52
2.	"Only Love"		2:05
3.	"Blue Moon" (Cover of standard from 1934)	Richard Rodgers, Lorenz Hart	2:16
4.	"I'll Never Get Over You" (Johnny Kidd & the Pirates cover)	Gordon Mills	2:10
5.	"Wonderful Dream" (The Majors cover)	Norman Margulies, Edward Marshall	2:20
6.	"Doo Wah Diddy" (The Exciters cover)	Jeff Barry, Ellie Greenwich	2:41

Side two
No.	Title	Writer(s)	Length
7.	"I Wanna Take You Home"		2:52
8.	"Cool Cool Cat"		2:28
9.	"Then Came You"		3:10
10.	"Teen Canteen"		2:15
11.	"It's Only Make Believe" (Conway Twitty cover)	Conway Twitty, Jack Nance	2:35
12.	"Always and Ever" (Johnny Kidd & the Pirates cover)	Ralph Ruvin	3:05
Total length:			30:49

=== 2003 CD reissue bonus tracks ===
The 2003 reissue on 7T’s Records (GLAM CD 16) included the following bonus tracks, both written by Showaddywaddy:

1. "Really Going Out of My Mind" (first released on b-side of "Blue Moon")
2. "You Are Love" (first released on b-side of "Doo Wah Diddy")

== Personnel ==
Showaddywaddy

- Dave Bartram – lead vocals
- Buddy Gask – lead vocals
- Russ Field – guitars
- Trevor Oakes – guitars
- Rod Deas – bass guitar
- Al James – bass guitar
- Malcolm Allured – drums
- Romeo Challenger – drums

Production

- Showaddywaddy – producers
- John Acock – engineer
- Bill Somerville-Large & John Acock– engineer (tracks 1, 9, 12)
- The Hutton Company / Simon John – sleeve design concept
- Paul Allen – album illustration

== Charts ==
Chart (1980)	Peak position
UK Albums (Official Charts)	33

== Certifications ==
Region	Certification	Certified units/sales
United Kingdom (BPI)	Silver	60,000^{^}
^{^} Shipments figures based on certification alone.

== Release history ==
- 1 December 1980 – Original UK LP (Arista SPART 1142) and cassette (TC-ART 1142)
- 1988 - Reissued as Step Six (Bright Lights) (Tiger Records SHOLP 6)
- 2003 – CD reissue with 2 bonus tracks (7T's Records GLAM CD 16)
- 2013 – Included in the box set The Complete Studio Recordings 1973–1988 (Edsel Records SHOBOX40)
