= The Lana Sisters =

British vocal group

- Origin: England
- Genres: Pop
- Years active: 1958–1963
- Label: Fontana Records
- Past members: Riss Long; Lynne Abrams; Mary O'Brien

The Lana Sisters were a British vocal group formed by Iris Long in 1958, with Lynne Abrams. They placed an advert in The Stage for a third member and received a reply from Mary O'Brien, who would go on to solo success a few years later as Dusty Springfield.

They were managed by Evelyn Taylor, and toured around England. Initial publicity for the group claimed they were three actual sisters with the surname Lana: Iris (or Riss), Lynne, and Shann (or Shan). (Iris Long and Lynne Abrams were Riss and Lynne Lana, Mary O'Brien was Shann Lana.) They appeared on the BBC's Six-Five Special and Drumbeat with Adam Faith and John Barry, and later took part in a Christmas special "Tommy Steele’s Spectacular" with the song "Seven Little Girls Sitting in the Backseat".

They appeared twice at the Royal Albert Hall and toured with Cliff Richard, Adam Faith, and Morecambe & Wise. Their cover of the Marv Johnson song "You Got What It Takes" became a Top 10 hit in Ireland in 1960.

Mary O'Brien left the Lana Sisters in 1960, taking the stage name Dusty Springfield and joining her brother Tom Springfield and another friend (Tim Feild) to make The Springfields. She went solo in 1963.

The Lana Sisters continued until 1963, when Lynne Abrams left to get married. Riss Long then formed the Chantelles with two friends, Sandra Orr and Jay Adams. They appeared in the 1965 music film Dateline Diamonds.

== Discography ==
=== Singles ===
- 1958: "Chimes of Arcady" / "Ring-a My Phone" (Fontana H 148)
- 1959: "Buzzin'" / "Cry, Cry, Baby" (Fontana H 176)
- 1959: "Mister Dee Jay" / "Tell Him No" (Fontana H 190)
- 1959: "(Seven Little Girls) Sitting in the Back Seat" (with Al Saxon) / "Sitting on the Sidewalk" (Fontana H 221)
- 1960: "My Mother's Eyes" / "You Got What It Takes" (Fontana H 235)
- 1960: "Tintarella Di Luna (Magic Colour Of The Moonlight)" / "Someone Loves You, Joe" (Fontana H 252)
- 1960: "Two-Some" / "Down South" (Fontana H 283)

=== Compilations ===
- 2011: Chantelly Lace: The Complete Singles Plus Bonus Tracks (RPM Records RETRO 896)
- 2013: The Springfields, The Lana Sisters – Introducing The Springfields (One Day Music, DAYCD205)
- 2014: Dusty Springfield featuring The Lana Sisters and The Springfields – The Early Years (Jasmine Records JASCD 759)
