= Showaddywaddy (album) =

1974 debut album by Showaddywaddy

Studio album by Showaddywaddy
- Released: 8 November 1974
- Recorded: 1974
- Studios: De Lane Lea, London
- Genres: Rock and roll; pop; doo-wop
- Length: 34:31
- Label: Bell
- Producer: Mike Hurst

Showaddywaddy chronology
Showaddywaddy (1974)	Step Two (1975)

Singles from Showaddywaddy
- 1. "Hey Rock 'n' Roll" Released: 19 April 1974; 2. "Rock 'n' Roll Lady" Released: 17 August 1974

Showaddywaddy is the eponymous debut studio album by English rock and roll revival group Showaddywaddy. Released on 8 November 1974 through Bell Records, the album peaked at number 9 on the UK Albums Chart and remained in the chart for 19 weeks, certified silver by the British Phonographic Industry (BPI) on 1 February 1975. The album was released and distributed in several European countries, as well as Australia, New Zealand, and Japan.

Unlike the group's later reputation as primarily a covers band, the album features nine original compositions alongside three covers of classic 1950s and 1960s tracks. It spawned two successful UK singles: "Hey Rock 'n' Roll" (which reached number 2) and "Rock 'n' Roll Lady" (which reached number 15). Prior to the album’s release the band appeared five times on the national British television show Top of the Pops, miming to the two singles from the album.

== Critical reception ==
Professional ratings
Review scores
Source	Rating
AllMusic	4/5 stars
The Encyclopedia of Popular Music	3/5 stars
Record Mirror	Good

Record Mirror rated the album a good debut in its review on 16 November 1974, noting "a very solid side one" and that side two was "well played and sung". In a retrospective review for AllMusic, critic Dave Thompson awarded the album four out of five stars, praising the group as one of the finest and most enduring rock & roll revival bands of the 1970s. Thompson noted that while they emerged alongside other glam-era retro groups, their run of early material sounded remarkably pure and authentic, effectively balancing commercial pop appeal with true energy. The Encyclopedia of Popular Music gave the album a three-star rating, meaning the album was "good" by the groups "usual standards".

== Track listing ==
All tracks are written by Buddy Gask, Trevor Oakes, Al James, Romeo Challenger, Dave Bartram, Russ Field, Rod Deas, and Malcolm Allured, except where noted.

No.	Title	Writer(s)	Length
1.	"Hey Rock 'n' Roll"		3:25
2.	"Bony Moronie"	Larry Williams	2:26
3.	"Johnny Remember Me"	Geoff Goddard	2:52
4.	"Temptation"	Nacio Herb Brown, Arthur Freed	2:59
5.	"Rock 'n' Roll Lady"		3:23
6.	"King of the Jive"		2:10
7.	"The Party"		3:06
8.	"Cutie"		2:56
9.	"Rollercoaster"		3:14
10.	"Don't Turn Your Back on Me Baby"		2:47
11.	"Windows"		2:27
12.	"Glory Woman"		3:22
Total length:			34:31

=== 2000 CD reissue bonus tracks ===
The 2000 reissue on 7T’s Records (GLAM CD 2) included the following bonus tracks, both written by Showaddywaddy:

1. "You Will Lose Your Love Tomorrow" (first released on B-side of "Hey Rock 'n' Roll")
2. "I’m a Traveller" (first released on B-side of "Rock 'n' Roll Lady")

== Personnel ==
Showaddywaddy

- Dave Bartram – vocals
- Buddy Gask – vocals
- Russ Field – guitar
- Trevor Oakes – guitar
- Al James – bass
- Rod Deas – bass
- Malcolm Allured – drums
- Romeo Challenger – drums

Production

- Mike Hurst – producer
- Dave Hunt – engineer

== Charts ==
Chart performance for Showaddywaddy
Chart (1974)	Peak position
UK Albums Chart	9

== Certifications ==
Region	Certification	Certified units/sales
United Kingdom (BPI)	Silver	60,000^{^}
^{^} Shipments figures based on certification alone.

== Release history ==
- 8 November 1974 – Original UK LP (BELLS 248) and cassette (TC-BEL 248).
- 1988 - Reissued as Step One (Showaddywaddy) (Tiger Records SHOLP 1)
- 2000 – CD reissue with 2 bonus tracks (7T's Records GLAM CD 2)
- 2013 – Included in the box set The Complete Studio Recordings 1973–1988 (Edsel Records SHOBOX40)
