= Sweet Little Rock 'n' Roller =

Sweet Little Rock 'n' Roller may refer to:

- "Sweet Little Rock 'n' Roller", a 1958 song by Chuck Berry included on his 1959 album Berry Is on Top
  - Sweet Little Rock 'n' Roller, a 1959 EP and a 1997 compilation album by Chuck Berry
- "Sweet Little Rock 'n' Roller", a 1974 song by Joe Dolan; covered by Jerry Williams (1974) and Showaddywaddy (1979)
  - Sweet Little Rock 'n' Roller, a 1974 studio album by Jerry Williams
  - Sweet Little Rock 'n' Roller, a 1987 compilation album by Showaddywaddy
- "Sweet Little R'R", a 1987 song by Chris von Rohr from his album Hammer & Tongue, covered as "Sweet Little Rock 'n' Roller" by Gotthard on their 1996 album G.
