= Multiplication (disambiguation) =

Multiplication is an elementary mathematical operation.

Multiplication or multiply may also refer to:

- A generalized multiplicative function, in number theory
- Multiply (website), e-commerce website based in Jakarta, Indonesia
- Multiplication of money, the compounding of central bank funds by commercial lending
- Multiplication (alchemy), an alchemical process
- Product (mathematics), a result of multiplying

== Music ==
- Multiplication (music), methods of applying multiplication in music
- Multiply Records, a record label
- Multiply (Jamie Lidell album), 2005
- x (Ed Sheeran album), 2014
- X∞Multiplies, a 1980 album by Yellow Magic Orchestra
- "Multiplication" (song), a 1961 song by Bobby Darin
- "Multiply" (ASAP Rocky song), 2014
- "Multiply" (Xzibit song), 2002
- "Multiplied", a 2014 song by NEEDTOBREATHE from Rivers in the Wasteland
