= The Halos =

The Halos were an American doo wop group from The Bronx.

The group formed with members Al Cleveland, J.R. Bailey, Harold Johnson, and Arthur Crier (bass). Phil Johnson replaced J.R. Bailey shortly after the recording of "Nag". (Bailey later joined The Cadillacs.)

The group got its start as session musicians, backing up vocalists recorded by producer Morty Craft. Their first single, "L-O-V-E" b/w "Heartbreaking World", was released in 1961 under the name The Craftys. It peaked at No. 4 on the Bubbling Under Hot 100 Singles. Their second release, now under the name The Halos, "Nag" b/w "Copy Cat", became a hit, reaching No. 25 on the Billboard Hot 100. Further singles were not successful, but the group continued as a studio ensemble, appearing on the Phil Spector-produced tunes "Pretty Little Angel Eyes" by Curtis Lee and "Every Breath I Take" by Gene Pitney, as well as Barry Mann's "Who Put the Bomp (in the Bomp, Bomp, Bomp)".

Arthur Crier (born on April 1, 1935, in Manhattan, New York) died on July 22, 2004, at age 69. Crier's son, Keith "Sabu" Crier, was later a member of GQ, and his grandson is Keith Sweat.

== Members ==
- Al Cleveland
- Arthur Crier
- Phil Johnson
- Harold Johnson
