= Tzena, Tzena, Tzena =

1941 song in Hebrew

"Tzena, Tzena, Tzena" (Hebrew: צאנה צאנה צאנה, "Come Out, Come Out, Come Out"), sometimes "Tzena, Tzena", is a song, written in 1941 in Hebrew. Its music is by Issachar Miron (a.k.a. Stefan Michrovsky), a Polish emigrant in what was then the British Mandate of Palestine (now Israel), and the lyrics are by Yechiel Chagiz.

== History ==
Miron, born in 1919, left Poland at the age of 19 in the late 1930s, thus avoiding the Holocaust. In 1941, while serving in the Jewish Brigade of the British forces, he composed the melody for lyrics written by Chagiz. The song became popular in the British Mandate of Palestine and was played on the Kol Yisrael radio service.

"Tzena, Tzena, Tzena"

Single by The Weavers
- B-side: "Goodnight, Irene"
- Released: 1950
- Genre: Folk
- Length: 2:43
- Label: Decca
- Songwriters: Issachar Miron, Julius Grossman, Spencer Ross, Gordon Jenkins

Julius Grossman, who did not know who composed the song, wrote the so-called third part of "Tzena" circa November 1946. After hearing Pete Seeger performing "Tzena", with The Weavers as backing, Gordon Jenkins made an arrangement of the song for the Weavers with English lyrics. The Jenkins/Weavers version, released by Decca Records under catalog number 27077, was one side of a two-sided hit, reaching No. 2 on the Billboard magazine charts in 1950 while the flip side, "Goodnight, Irene", reached No. 1.

Cromwell Music Inc., a subsidiary of Richmond/TRO, claimed the rights to the song, and had licensed the Decca release. They alleged the music to have been composed by a person named Spencer Ross. In reality this turned out to be a fictitious persona constructed to hide the melody's true authorship. Mills Music, Inc., Miron's publisher, sued Cromwell and won. The presiding judge also dismissed Cromwell's claim that the melody was based on a traditional folk song and was thus in the public domain.

== Covers ==
The original English lyrics, written by Mitchell Parish, were greatly altered in the version recorded by the Weavers. Other charting versions in 1950 were recorded by Vic Damone (Billboard pos. 6), Ralph Flanagan & His Orchestra, and Mitch Miller's Orchestra.

The New York Times obituary of Issachar Miron lists the following artists who covered "Tsena Tsena": "It was sung in some 39 languages and was performed and recorded by numerous leading artists in the United States, including Pete Seeger, Frank Sinatra, Bing Crosby, Nat King Cole, Judy Garland, Dusty Springfield, Connie Francis, Vic Damone, Chubby Checker, the Smothers Brothers and Arlo Guthrie."

- Guitarist Chet Atkins recorded an instrumental version of "Tzena, Tzena, Tzena" on his 1960 album The Other Chet Atkins.
- 1960: Connie Francis, Connie Francis Sings Jewish Favorites, Universal Records
- 1961: The Springfields, album Kinda Folksy, a cover of the version by The Weavers described by Richie Unterberger as "a ridiculously brassy arrangement"
- 1961: A humorous version titled "Tzena, Tzena, Tzena, Tzena" was recorded by the Smothers Brothers on their 1961 debut album, The Smothers Brothers at the Purple Onion.
- 1961 Canada, 1962, USA The Barry Sisters, album Shalom as part of Side A, track 1: "Izraeli Medley" ("Artza Alinu Tzena-Tzena")
- 1964: Chubby Checker, on Chubby's Folk Album

== Text ==
צאנה צאנה צאנה צאנה הבנות וראינה

חיילים במושבה
אל נא אל נא אל נא תתחבאנה
מבן חייל איש צבא

Tzena, tzena, tzena, tzena ha-banot u-r'ena
ħayalim ba-moshava;
Al na, al na, al na, al na,
al na titħab'ena Mi-ben ħayal, ish tzava.

Go out, go out, go out girls and see
soldiers in the moshava;
Do not, do not, do not hide yourself away
from a virtuous man [a pun on the word for "soldier"], an army man.
