= Dear Hearts and Gentle People =

1949 popular song

Song
- Published: 1949
- Composer: Sammy Fain
- Lyricist: Bob Hilliard

"Dear Hearts and Gentle People" is a popular song published in 1949 with music by Sammy Fain and lyrics by Bob Hilliard. The song refers to the singer's hometown, and different versions allude to a range of U.S. states.

== Background ==
The songwriters were inspired to write the song based on a scrap of paper with the words "Dear friends and gentle hearts" written on it that was found on the body of Stephen Foster when he was discovered dying in a New York hotel room in January 1864.

== 1949 recordings ==
Popular versions were recorded in 1949 by:

- The Dinah Shore recording was recorded on September 9, 1949, and released by Columbia Records (as catalog number 38605). This version alludes to Tennessee, Shore's home state. The recording first appeared on the Billboard charts on November 19, 1949, lasting 17 weeks and peaking at position number two.
- The Gordon MacRae recording was recorded on October 21, 1949, and released by Capitol Records (as catalog number 777). It peaked at number 19 on the Billboard charts. The flip side was "Mule Train," which MacRae recorded October 1, 1949.
- The Bing Crosby recording was recorded on October 26, 1949, and released by Decca Records (as catalog number 24798). This version mentions the state of Idaho, close to Crosby's hometown of Spokane, Washington. The flip side was "Mule Train". The recording first appeared on the Billboard charts on December 3, 1949, lasting 17 weeks and peaking at number two.
- The Dennis Day recording was released by RCA Victor Records as a 78 rpm single (catalog number 20-3596), and as a 45 rpm single (catalog number 47-3102). The recording first appeared on the Billboard charts on January 14, 1950, lasting four weeks and peaking at number 14.

== Other recordings ==
- A Doreen Lundy recording was recorded on February 22, 1950, and released by EMI's UK Columbia Records label (as catalog number DB 2649).
- The song was performed by Gene Autry and the Cass County Boys in the 1950 Columbia Pictures film Beyond the Purple Hills.
- The Perry Como recording of April 23, 1959, was released as a track on the album Como Swings (catalog number LSP-2010). The Como recording of July 1980, from a live performance, was released on the album Perry Como Live on Tour in 1981 (catalog number AQL1-3826).
- A version recorded by Bob Crosby and the Bobcats was featured in three hit video games of the Fallout franchise, Fallout 3 Fallout 4, and Fallout 76, published by Bethesda Softworks.
- The British vocal group The Springfields (with Dusty Springfield on lead vocals) included their version on their 1961 album Kinda Folksy.
- The song was also performed by entertainers Sharon, Lois & Bram for their TV series The Elephant Show in 1989 and also in concerts.
