= Pretty Little Angel Eyes =

Single by Curtis Lee
- B-side: "Gee, How I Wish You Were Here"
- Released: June 1961
- Recorded: 1961
- Genre: Pop, doo-wop
- Length: 2:33
- Label: Dunes
- Songwriters: Curtis Lee, Tommy Boyce
- Producer: Phil Spector

Curtis Lee singles chronology
"Pledge of Love" (1961)	"Pretty Little Angel Eyes" (1961)	"Under the Moon of Love" (1961)

"Pretty Little Angel Eyes" is a 1961 song by American singer Curtis Lee. It was released on Dunes Records, #45-2007. Phil Spector served as producer, and also produced Lee's follow-up hit "Under the Moon of Love".

== Background ==
The track is in the doo-wop style, with backing vocals by the Halos. The Halos were a doo-wop group composed of Harold Johnson, Al Cleveland, Phil Johnson, and Arthur Crier (bass).

== Chart history and performance ==
Chart (1961)	Peak position
Canada - CHUM Hit Parade	15
New Zealand – Lever Hit Parade	5
U.S. Billboard Hot 100	7
U.S. Cash Box Top 100	6
UK Record Retailer	47

The song spent 11 weeks on the Billboard Hot 100, peaking at No. 7, while reaching No. 6 on the Cash Box Top 100, Outside the US, the song reached No. 5 on New Zealand's "Lever Hit Parade", No. 15 on Canada's CHUM Hit Parade, and No. 47 on the UK's Record Retailer chart.

The song was ranked No. 77 on Billboard's end of year "Hot 100 for 1961 - Top Sides of the Year" and No. 56 on Cash Box's "Top 100 Chart Hits of 1961".

== Cover versions ==
Notable acts who have performed the song include:

- Sha Na Na
- Showaddywaddy
- The Delltones released a version of ("Pretty Little Angel Eyes") on their 1983 album ("Bop 'Till Ya Drop"). The same song was also released on their 40th anniversary compilation album ("The Big Four O") in 1998.

== See also ==
- List of 1960s one-hit wonders in the United States
