= Reshad Feild =

British musician and spiritualist (1934–2016)

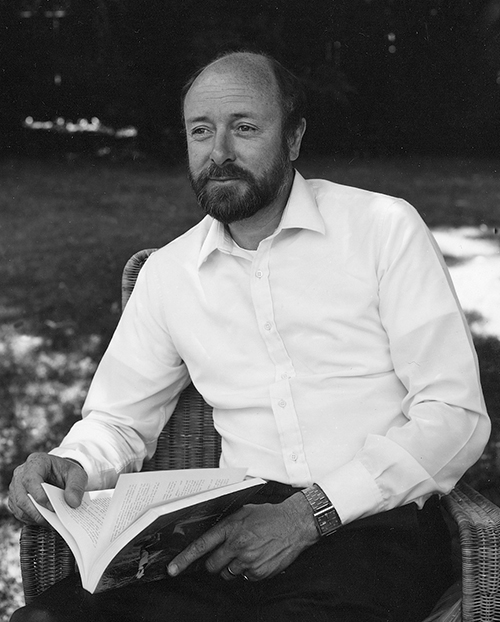
- Feild in 1976
- Born: Richard Timothy Feild; 15 April 1934; Hascombe, Surrey, England
- Died: 31 May 2016 (aged 82); Devon, England
- Other name: Tim Feild
- Education: Eton College
- Occupations: Author, musician
- Known for: books on Sufism, musician of the Springfields
- Children: JJ Feild

Reshad Feild (born Richard Timothy Feild; 15 April 1934 – 31 May 2016) was an English mystic, author, spiritual teacher, and musician, who, as Tim Feild, originally came to prominence as a founder member of folk-pop group the Springfields. He was later the author of more than a dozen books about spirituality, and Sufism in particular.

== Life and career ==
Feild was born in Hascombe, Surrey, England, the son of publisher Armistead Littlejohn Feild (1891-1937) and Violet Esmé (1898-1986), daughter of Henry Cumberland Bentley, a brewery director. Feild was educated at Eton and served in the Royal Navy, where he had an undistinguished career. In the early 1960s, Feild formed a folk duo, the Kensington Squares, with Dion O'Brien, later known as Tom Springfield. When the duo added Dion's sister Mary, they became the Springfields, with Mary becoming known as Dusty Springfield. The trio had minor pop hits in Britain before Feild left in late 1962 and was replaced by Mike Hurst.

Feild was influenced by the spiritual teachings of G. I. Gurdjieff, P. D. Ouspensky, and others. He studied spiritual healing, and was involved with the Alice Bailey community. In the late 1960s, he was initiated as a sheikh in the Sufi Order International by Pir Vilayat Inayat Khan. Feild studied with Bulent Rauf, a Turkish author and translator descended from a line of Sufi masters going back to the Andalusian mystic Muhyiddin Ibn Arabi (1165–1240). He established the Beshara Centre at Swyre Farm in Aldsworth, England, in 1970. A description of events at the centre is given in the books I, Wabenzi by Rafi Zabor, and Beshara and Ibn 'Arabi: A Movement of Sufi Spirituality in the Modern World.

In December 1971, Feild and a group of students went to Konya, Turkey, to meet Bulent and the sema of the Mevlevi order of Dervishes. While there, he met Sheikh Suleiman (Süleyman) Dede. In 1972, Feild resigned his role in the Sufi Order. In 1973, he resigned his role leading the Beshara Centre and went to Los Angeles, Tepoztlan, Mexico, and Vancouver Island, BC, where he taught on his own.

In 1976, he was made a Sheikh in the Mevlevi order by Suleyman Dede, which was a revolutionary move, because before Sufism was made illegal in Turkey in 1925, a sheikh of the Mevlevi Order would not usually appoint another sheikh. The role of sheikh was often hereditary or government-appointed, and sometimes overseen by the eldest male descendent of Rumi in Konya, the Makam Çelebi, the senior figure in the whole Mevlevi Order, who could decide to bestow such a title directly. In light of that, Feild's role as a Mevlevi Sheikh would likely not have been acknowledged traditionally in the Turkish culture and hierarchy of the Mevlevi Order, and could be best viewed as a transformatory off-shoot of the Order.

After receiving the rank of Sheikh, Reshad Feild moved to Boulder, Colorado, where he started a small centre. In Boulder, Reshad assisted in introducing the sema ceremony – which was declared a cultural world heritage activity by UNESCO in 2004 – to America and Europe, and made it available to women for the first time in recent history, as well as to non-Muslim participants, such as students.

Later, Feild taught on the essence of the universality of Sufi teachings, making them available to people of all religious and spiritual backgrounds. He published more than a dozen books, some of which have been translated into many languages. In his autobiographical novel, The Last Barrier, he gave a fictionalised account of how he met Bulent Rauf.

He was the father of the actor JJ Feild.

== Published works ==
- The Last Barrier – A True Story of a Journey into Ultimate Reality (autobiographical trilogy part I) ISBN 978-3-942914-03-1
- To Know We're Loved – The Invisible Way (autobiographical trilogy part II) ISBN 978-3-942914-07-9
- Going Home – The Journey of a Travelling Man (Autobiographical trilogy part III) ISBN 1-85230-878-8
- The Alchemy of the Heart ISBN 1-4208-3110-0
- Steps to Freedom: Discourses on the Essential Knowledge of the Heart ISBN 0-9625412-1-4
- Here to Heal ISBN 978-0-89556-157-2
- Reason Is Powerless in the Expression of Love ISBN 0-9625412-0-6
- Footprints in the Sand ISBN 1-85230-027-2
- A Travelling People's Feild Guide ISBN 1-85230-003-5
- Breathing Alive – A Guide to Conscious Living ISBN 1-85230-050-7
- The Inner Work (3 volumes) ISBN 978-3-905272-21-5, ISBN 978-3-905272-22-2 and ISBN 978-3-942914-01-7
- Breathe for God's Sake! Discourses on the Mystical Art and Science of Breath ISBN 978-3-942914-08-6
