= Issachar Miron =

Israeli composer (1920–2015)

Issachar Miron (Hebrew: יששכר מירון; July 5, 1920 – January 29, 2015) was an Israeli and American composer, best known for the song "Tzena, Tzena, Tzena". He was also a poet, writer, educator, filmmaker and stage producer.

== Biography ==
Miron was born Stefan Michrowski in Kutno, Interwar Poland to a family of Shlomo Michrowski (department store owner, rabbi, and violinist) and Haya Helen Elbaum-Michrowski (a proficient amateur pianist). His mother died in 1927 at the age of 36 and his father perished in The Holocaust in the Chelmno Ghetto. Miron studied composition and conduction in Warsaw Conservatory and moved to Erez Israel in 1939, thus narrowly escaping the fate of his relatives. He served in the Jewish Brigade of the British Army (under the name of Issachar Michrowsky) and at that time composed the music to the song "Tzena, Tzena, Tzena" on the words of Yechiel Chagiz, a song later sung in 39 languages and recorded by numerous artists.

At the deposition for the copyright violation case of Mills Music vs. Cromwell Music (1954), Miron testified that he wrote the song in the latter part of 1941, when he was with the Jewish troops of the British Army in Haifa, at the Peninsula Barracks. In particular, he said:

“I got some words that had been written by another soldier in the 22nd Company; the name of this soldier was Jehiel Hagges. The words were brought to me by a lance corporal, whose name is Blum. He showed me the words, and he asked me to compose the music as quickly as possible so that he could take them back when he returned to the 22nd Company. Blum was originally from the 2nd Company to which I belonged, but for a certain time he worked in the 22nd Company as an instructor. When I saw the words, I felt that I could compose a melody for them. I was very enthusiastic when I wrote this melody and I can say that I wrote the music, I might say so, with the blood of my heart.”

Miron served as Officer-in-Chief of Cultural Programs of the Israel Defense Forces and after the discharge as National Deputy Director of Music for Israel's Ministry of Education and Culture.

In 1963 he emigrated to the United States, where he continued to compose music.

His archive is at the Music Department at the Jewish National University Library, Jerusalem.

== Awards and recognition ==
- 2010: ASCAP's Deems Taylor Award "in celebration of his 90th year and in recognition of his lifetime achievements as creator, composer, author, poet, filmmaker, educator, master photographer and beloved international musical citizen"
- 1958: He was awarded the Alconi Award for composing Jewish hymns, part of the Engel Prize.
- 1964: Kavod Award from the Cantors Assembly for "immense contributions to Jewish liturgical music"
- 1983: International Film and TV Festival; Miron's film Partners in Faith won the Gold Medal
- 1984: 27th Annual Awards Competition of the International Film and TV Festival awarded two productions by Miron / United Jewish Appeal: Gold Medal for Giving To Life, a multimedia musical, and silver medal for Tree of Light.
- 2008: Pete Seeger's album At 89 earned the Grammy Award for Best Traditional Folk Album. and Miron got an honorary mention from the Recording Academy for his song "Tzena", which was performed in this album in three languages: Hebrew, Arabic and English.

== Books ==
1993: Eighteen Gates of Jewish Holidays and Festivals

== Family ==
His wife Tsipora Miron was a pianist and organist. Miron was survived by three daughters, Ruth Schleider, Shlomit Aviram and Miriam Lipton, plus six grandchildren, Jennifer and Jeffrey Schleider, Scott and Julie Sholem, Zachary and Gabrielle Lipton, and eight great-grandchildren.
