= Footsteps (Steve Lawrence song) =

Single by Steve Lawrence
- B-side: "You Don't Know"
- Released: February 1960 (US); April 1960 (UK)
- Genre: Pop
- Length: 2:07
- Label: ABC-Paramount (US); His Master's Voice (UK)
- Songwriters: Barry Mann, Hank Hunter
- Producer: Don Costa

Steve Lawrence singles chronology
"Pretty Blue Eyes" (1959)	"Footsteps" (1960)	"Girls, Girls, Girls" (1960)

"Footsteps" is a hit single by the American singer and actor Steve Lawrence, recorded in January 1960 and released in spring 1960 by ABC-Paramount Records in the US and His Master's Voice in the UK. The song was written by Barry Mann and Hank Hunter.

The single has Lawrence's wife, Eydie Gormé, as a backing vocalist and Don Costa's Orchestra and chorus.

== Charts ==
In the US, it spent 13 weeks on the Billboard Hot 100, peaking at No. 7 on April 4, 1960, while reaching No. 4 in the Record Retailer chart in the UK, No. 3 in the CHUM Hit Parade in Canada, and No. 9 on VG-lista in Norway.

Chart (1960)	Peak position
Canada CHUM Hit Parade	3
Netherlands	16
Norway VG-lista	9
UK Record Retailer	4
US Billboard Hot 100	7
US Cash Box Top 100	9
US Cash Box Records Disc Jockeys Played Most	4
US Cash Box Top Ten Juke Box Tunes	9
Wallonia	29

== Cover versions ==
- Barry Mann sang this song on his 1961 Who Put The Bomp album.
- It was also a hit for Ronnie Carroll in 1960, peaking at No. 36 in the UK.
- Showaddywaddy released their version of the song in 1981, peaking at No. 31 in the UK.
