= Tom Springfield =

English musician, songwriter and record producer (1934–2022)

- Springfield, 1962

Background information
- Also known as: Dion O'Brien
- Born: Dionysius Patrick O'Brien; 2 July 1934; Hampstead, London, England
- Died: 27 July 2022 (aged 88) Chelsea, London, England
- Genres: Folk, pop
- Occupations: Musician; songwriter; record producer
- Instruments: Vocals, piano, guitar
- Years active: 1960s–1970

Tom Springfield (born Dionysius Patrick O'Brien, 2 July 1934 – 27 July 2022) was a British musician, songwriter, and record producer who was prominent in the 1960s folk and pop music scene. He was the older brother of singer Dusty Springfield, with whom he performed in the Springfields. He wrote several hit songs for the Springfields ("Island of Dreams", "Say I Won't Be There") and later for the Seekers ("I'll Never Find Another You", "A World of Our Own", "The Carnival Is Over", "Georgy Girl"), whose records he also produced.

== Early life ==
Known in early life as Dion O'Brien, he was born in Hampstead, London, on 2 July 1934, the first child of Gerard O'Brien and his wife Kay (née Ryle), originally from County Kerry. He attended the Royal Grammar School in High Wycombe from 1944 to 1950.

== National Service ==
Springfield (as O'Brien) joined the army for his National Service (1952–54), and was assigned to the Joint Services School for Linguists in Coulsdon, Surrey. The school was known as "the Russian course", and its purpose was to train conscripts in intelligence techniques. The course provided exposure to the Russian language by studying Russian literature, films, and also songs. These were taken from a selection known as the "Samovar Song Book", which Springfield and the rest of the "Coulsdon choir" sang together (in Russian). One of these songs was a Russian folksong from 1883 called Stenka Razin; twelve years later Springfield used its melody as the basis of his hit song "The Carnival is Over". Springfield was a talented pianist, and occasionally played jazz in the NAAFI with Tony Cash (later a BBC TV producer) on clarinet, and Malcolm Brown on guitar.

After Coulsdon, Springfield was assigned to the Intelligence Corps depot in Maresfield, Sussex (1954). While there he joined up with two other musicians to form a guitar trio playing Latin American songs, with Tom singing in Spanish and Portuguese. They recorded two songs at a small studio in Brighton; one was "El Cangaceiro" ("The Bandit" – from the 1953 Brazilian movie O Cangaceiro) and the other was written by Tom and called "Magdelena".

Springfield was a founder member of vocal group the Pedini Brothers, active from 1952 to 1955. They mainly sang Latin American, plus Russian songs adapted by Tom from his course material. Colleague Nick Bowyer wrote: "Tom was extremely proficient on both piano and guitar, and played both by ear. [He] also played ragtime piano solos on gigs. We were together from 1952 until 1955, but somewhat spasmodically because of National Service."

After leaving the military, he worked in banking for a short period, before pursuing his musical career in earnest.

== Career ==
In the late fifties O'Brien formed a duo, "The Kensington Squares", with folk musician Tim Feild, whom he had met while playing clubs in Belgravia, London. His younger sister, Mary O'Brien, was at the time performing as one of the Lana Sisters, and when that group folded in 1960, he invited her to join him and Tim to form a new folk-pop vocal trio, the Springfields. O'Brien adopted the stage name Tom Springfield while Mary became Dusty Springfield (Dusty was a nickname given to her when she had played football in the street with the local boys). O'Brien, now Springfield, sang and played guitar. Mike Hurst replaced Feild in 1962.

Five of the group's singles were UK Top 40 hits between 1961 and 1963, and two of them reached No. 5 in the charts. These were "Island of Dreams", written and composed by Springfield, and "Say I Won't Be There", the melody of which was adapted by him from the traditional French song "Au clair de la lune" to accompany his new lyrics. The group was also successful in the US, particularly with their version of "Silver Threads and Golden Needles" which reached No. 20 on Billboard's Hot 100. This was the first single by a British group to reach the top 20 of the Hot 100. "Island of Dreams" was later covered by Mick Thomas, Johnny Tillotson, Mary Hopkin, Geraint Watkins with Martin Belmont, and by the Seekers.

After the Springfields broke up in 1963 when Dusty began her solo career, Springfield became a record producer and songwriter for the Australian folk-pop group the Seekers. He wrote many of their major hits including their first UK number one, "I'll Never Find Another You", followed by "A World of Our Own", and the million-selling "The Carnival Is Over", the melody of which Springfield adapted from the Russian song "Stenka Razin", though he wrote entirely new lyrics. Other hits included "Walk With Me", and "Georgy Girl", co-written with Jim Dale, who supplied the lyrics. This was the Seekers' most successful release in the US, reaching number two on the Billboard Hot 100 and number one on the Cashbox charts; it was nominated for an Academy Award for Best Original Song of 1966, and for the equivalent Golden Globe Award the same year. Springfield and Diane Lampert co-wrote "The Olive Tree", recorded in 1967 as a solo single by The Seekers lead singer, Judith Durham whilst still performing with the group.

Apart from his work with the Seekers, he also co-wrote (with Clive Westlake) Frank Ifield's 1964 hit "Summer Is Over", and his sister Dusty's 1964 UK Top Ten hit "Losing You". Other hit compositions include "Adios Amour (Goodbye My Love)" (co-written with Norman Newell), which was recorded by José Feliciano and the Casuals; "Promises", also co-written with Norman Newell and a UK hit for Ken Dodd; and "Just Loving You", which became a 1967 top ten hit for Anita Harris.

He composed the theme to the popular BBC TV series The Troubleshooters, and the theme to the comedy series George and the Dragon. He also released two solo albums in the late 1960s, Sun Songs (1968) and Love's Philosophy (1969); these were re-released on CD in 2005.

== Later life ==
Mike Hurst reflected later on how little he knew of Tom and Dusty's private lives while he was performing with them in the sixties: "I never felt I knew them well, there was always a distance...I had no idea back then that Tom and Dusty were both gay. They were naïve times...I just wasn't really aware of such things." After a 1970 duet single with his sister Dusty, "Morning Please Don't Come", Springfield essentially retired from the music industry as both a writer and performer. He formally changed his name by deed poll from Dionysius Patrick O'Brien to Tom Springfield in 1977.

Springfield reportedly disliked being in the public eye, with former Springfields member Mike Hurst describing him as "a recluse, a bohemian in the true sense – he led his life in a solitary way doing what he wanted to do." In 1999, Springfield took his sister's ashes to Ireland and scattered them over the Cliffs of Moher. He lived in the United States for a period, and resided in Chelsea, London. He died from pneumonia at his home in Chelsea, on 27 July 2022, aged 88. His death was not reported for several weeks.

== Awards and nominations ==
=== Awards ===
- 1964 – ASCAP award for "I'll Never Find Another You"
- 1965 – ASCAP award for "A World of Our Own"

=== Nomination ===
- 1966 – Academy Award for Best Original Song for "Georgy Girl"
