= When (The Kalin Twins song) =

1958 pop song

Single by The Kalin Twins
- B-side: "Three O'Clock Thrill"
- Released: 1958
- Recorded: 1958
- Genre: Pop
- Length: 2:28
- Label: Brunswick Records
- Songwriters: Paul Evans, Jack Reardon
- Producer: Jack Pleis

"When"

Single by Showaddywaddy

from the album Red Star
- B-side: "Superstar"
- Released: 1977
- Recorded: 1976
- Genre: Rock and roll
- Length: 3:27
- Label: Arista Records
- Songwriters: Paul Evans, Jack Reardon
- Producer: Mike Hurst

Showaddywaddy singles chronology
"Under the Moon of Love" (1976)	"When" (1977)	"You Got What It Takes" (1977)

"When" is a popular song written by Jack Reardon and Paul Evans and published in 1958.

== The Kalin Twins version ==
The biggest hit version was recorded by The Kalin Twins in 1958, a chart-topper in the UK Singles Chart for five weeks, No. 2 in Canada, and No. 5 in the US Billboard Hot 100. In the French singles charts of 1958, it spent 18 weeks as No. 1, and in the Netherlands the song charted for 30 weeks and was also a No. 1 for 5 weeks.

== Album appearances ==
The song was included on the compilation album The Original Hit Performances! The Late Fifties, Decca Records, 1959 (DL 4005), and on the oldies compilations Vintage Music, Volume One, MCA Records, 1986 (MCA-1429) CD (MCA-31198), 50's Hits: Great Records of the Decade, Curb Records, 1990 CD (D2-77354), and Glory Days of Rock n' Roll: Teen Ballads, Warner Special Products, 1999 (OPCD 3551).

== Cover versions ==
In 1958, the title "When" by Danyel Gérard, a French adaptation, was released in September on his first 45 rpm record at Barclay.

In 1958, a German version of "When" was recorded as "Wenn" by German Schlager music group Die James Brothers, released in 1959.

In 1977, Showaddywaddy had a UK No. 3 hit with the song.

The song was revived in 2004 by Daniel O'Donnell in his album of songs from the 1950s and 1960s, The Jukebox Years.

== See also ==
- List of UK Singles Chart number ones of the 1950s
