= Kalin Twins =

American pop duo

- Also known as: Hal and Herbie
- Born: February 16, 1934; Port Jervis, New York, U.S.
- Died: Harold: August 24, 2005 (aged 71); Herbert: July 21, 2006 (aged 72)
- Genre: Pop
- Years active: 1958–1962
- Label: Decca Records
- Past members: Harold Kalin; Herbert Kalin

The Kalin Twins (born February 16, 1934), also known as Hal and Herbie, were an American pop singing, songwriting and recording duo, formed in 1958 by twin brothers Harold Kalin and Herbert Kalin. The duo is best remembered for their number one 1958 hit "When".

== Career ==
The twins were born in Port Jervis, New York, but the family later moved to Washington, D.C.

While working in a Washington nightclub in November 1957, they pooled their funds to make a demonstration record and try to sell it in New York. "We were pretty discouraged," said Hal in 1958, "because every indie record label we went to turned us down. What could we do? Things were tough. We got back to Washington, took up daytime jobs, and worked club dates whenever we could." One of Hal's jobs was delivering singing telegrams for Western Union.

A few weeks later they met Clint Ballard Jr., later the writer of many hit records such as "Good Timin'" for Jimmy Jones, and "I'm Alive" for The Hollies. Ballard offered to help them. "We got an appointment with the Decca people," Herbie recalled, "and Jack Pleis signed us up. We had a record session right away but the first record was a bomb, and it seemed an awful long time till the next."

In 1958, after listening to piles of writers' demo tapes, Clint Ballard (now the Kalins' manager) discovered the song "When", written by Paul Evans and Jack Reardon. The twins cut "Three O'Clock Thrill" and "When" in April 1958, with Decca's Jack Pleis conducting the music. The record label wanted to promote "Three O'Clock Thrill" and released it as a single with "When" on the B-side, but Hal and Herbie preferred "When" and persistently plugged it on their nightclub tours. Ultimately "When" caught on, and Decca reissued the record with "When" now as the A-side. It shot to number five on the American charts, and hit number one on the UK Singles Chart on September 13, 1958. "When" sold over two million copies. The track remained in the UK listings for eighteen weeks, five of which were at number one. They had no further UK chart entries.

The Kalins were the first set of twins to reach number one in the UK as a duo, followed in 2007, almost 50 years later, by The Proclaimers with a single with Peter Kay and Matt Lucas for Comic Relief. The Kalins were supported by Cliff Richard on their only UK tour. Their second single, "Forget Me Not", reached number 12 in the US Billboard chart later in 1958. After two further low-ranking entries in 1959, they never reached the charts again. They continued working as a headline nightclub attraction into the 1960s, but without current records to promote them their exposure was limited.

== Post-music career ==
Eventually, disillusioned with diminishing returns, the brothers returned to their day jobs, with each pursuing college degrees. They did not perform again until 1977, when a mutual friend booked them to appear at his new nightclub. Sometimes they performed with their younger sibling, Jack, and thus appeared as the Kalin Brothers.

They disappeared again as a performing act, until 1989. Then, their one-time support act, Cliff Richard, invited them to play at his Wembley Stadium 'The Event' concerts, as part of a sequence paying homage to the 1950s television pop show, Oh Boy!

== Personal lives and deaths ==
Herbert Kalin was married and had four children, Suzan Lynn, Kelly Lee, Buddy Ladd, and Jonathan Ray.

Harold "Hal" Kalin died on August 24, 2005, as a result of injuries sustained in an automobile accident, aged 71. Herbert "Herbie" Kalin died July 21, 2006, from a heart attack, aged 72.

== Discography ==
- "Jumpin' Jack" b/w "Walkin' To School" — (1958) — each charted in the US publication Music Vendor, Feb-March 1958 — Decca Records
- "Three O'Clock Thrill" b/w "When" — (1958) — U.S. jukebox favorite, Decca Records
- "When" b/w "Three O'Clock Thrill" — (1958) — U.S. number 5 Decca Records — UK number 1 Brunswick Records - Canada number 2 Decca Records
- "Forget Me Not" b/w "Dream of Me" — (1958) — U.S. number 12 — Decca Records - Canada number 12 — Decca Records
- "It's Only the Beginning" b/w "Oh! My Goodness" — (1959) — U.S. number 42
- "When I Look in the Mirror" b/w "Cool" — (1959)
- "Sweet Sugar Lips" b/w "Moody" — (1959) — U.S. number 97
- "Why Don't You Believe Me" b/w "The Meaning of the Blues" — (1959)
- "Chicken Thief" b/w "Loneliness" — (1960)
- "Blue, Blue Town" b/w "True to You" — (1960)
- "Zing! Went the Strings of My Heart" b/w "No Money Can Buy" — (1960)
- "Momma-Poppa" b/w "You Mean the World To Me" — (1961)
- "Bubbles (I'm Forever Blowing Bubbles)" b/w "One More Time" — (1961)
- "A Picture of You" b/w "Trouble" — (1962)
- "Sometimes It Comes, Sometimes It Goes" b/w "Thinkin' About You Baby" — (1966) — Amy Records
- "Silver Seagull" — (1978)
- "American Eagle" b/w "When (Disco Version)" — (1979) — Octember Records
