= Multiplication (song) =

1961 single by Bobby Darin

Single by Bobby Darin
- B-side: "Irresistible You"
- Released: December 1961
- Recorded: August 15, 1961
- Genre: Pop rock
- Length: 2:18
- Label: Atco
- Songwriter(s): Bobby Darin

Bobby Darin singles chronology
"You Must Have Been a Beautiful Baby" (1961)	"Multiplication" (1961)	"What'd I Say" (1962)

"Multiplication" is a song recorded by American singer Bobby Darin, performed by him in the 1961 film Come September.

== Track listing and formats ==
- US 7-inch single

A. "Multiplication" – 2:18
B. "Irresistible You" – 2:30

== Credits and personnel ==
- Bobby Darin – songwriter, vocals
- Jimmie Haskell – arranger

Credits and personnel adapted from the 7-inch single liner notes.

== Charts ==
Weekly chart performance for "Multiplication"
Chart (1961–1962)	Peak position
Belgium (Ultratop 50 Wallonia)	29
Finland (Suomen virallinen lista)	6
Norway (VG-lista)	4
Sweden (Tio i Topp)	1
UK Singles (OCC)	5
US Billboard Hot 100	30
