= The Springfields =

British pop vocal trio (1960–1963)

- Origin: London, England
- Genre: Folk pop
- Years active: 1960–1963
- Label: Philips Records
- Members: Dusty Springfield; Tom Springfield; Tim Feild; Mike Hurst

The Springfields were a British folk-pop vocal trio who had success in the early 1960s in the UK, Australia, US and Ireland. They included singer Dusty Springfield and her brother, songwriter Tom Springfield, along with Tim Feild, who was later replaced by Mike Hurst.

== Career ==
The trio formed in 1960, when Mary "Dusty" O'Brien, who had been a member of all-girl singing trio the Lana Sisters, joined her brother Dion O'Brien and Tim Feild, who had been working as a duo, the Kensington Squares. Dion became Tom Springfield, and Mary became Dusty Springfield. The Springfields went on tour in Ireland, and had assembled a band of musicians, including a trumpet player, drummer and saxophonist George Cassidy.

Tom Springfield was a songwriter and arranger with a wide knowledge of folk music and the group had strong vocal harmonies as well as Dusty's powerful lead. Occupying a musical sphere comparable with that of the contemporary Peter, Paul and Mary, they were signed to Philips Records in London by producer Johnny Franz. In 1961, they released their first single, "Dear John" which failed to chart. They achieved UK success with the two follow-up releases, "Breakaway" (No. 31) and their Christmas hit "Bambino" (No. 16), also produced by Franz.

With the success of "Breakaway" and "Bambino" and numerous television appearances, the trio quickly became very popular in the UK. In 1961, they starred in their own 15-minute music TV series on the BBC, The Springfields. In late 1961, Feild's wife fell ill, and he left the group to look after her. Following an audition at Quaglino's restaurant in London in February 1962, Mike Hurst was taken on to replace him.

Hurst later reflected on the dynamics within the group: "We worked incredibly hard, rehearsing constantly. Dusty was the creative force and Tom had the business skills and wrote great songs....Tom sorted out with the manager what gigs we would do but it was Dusty who worked on the performance." She made the three of them stand in front of a mirror for hours with herself in the middle, rehearsing every on-stage move. "Everything was worked out to the nth degree."

In September 1962, their version of "Silver Threads and Golden Needles" reached No. 20 on Billboard's Hot 100. It was the first single by a British group to reach the top 20 of the Hot 100, predating the Tornados' number one "Telstar" by two months (and the Beatles' US chart entry by 16 months). The record peaked at No. 23 on the Cash Box chart and reached number one in Australia. It featured lead guitar by Judd Proctor. "Silver Threads and Golden Needles" sold more than one million copies and was RIAA-certified gold.

In December 1962, Tom's composition "Island of Dreams", his first recording made with Mike Hurst, debuted on the UK Singles Chart, where it remained for 26 weeks. It peaked at No. 5 in its 16th week on the chart, in early April 1963, five weeks before the Springfields' follow-up hit "Say I Won't Be There" would also peak at No. 5. By this time, the Springfields were one of the most popular groups in the UK. The group had several chart hits and had recorded several foreign language records. However, Dusty Springfield felt limited by the group's folk act and Tom's lead role within the trio, and she decided to leave for a solo career. She and Tom announced that the group was to be disbanded on the TV variety show Sunday Night at the London Palladium in October 1963.

Tom Springfield subsequently wrote a number of songs for Australian pop-folk band the Seekers, including the two UK number-one hits "I'll Never Find Another You" and "The Carnival Is Over", as well as the Oscar-nominated "Georgy Girl", which he wrote with actor-singer Jim Dale and which hit big on both sides of the Atlantic.

Mike Hurst found himself at a loose end after the breakup, but was not surprised by it: "I always recognised Dusty's power on stage. It was obvious to me she was destined for greater things. She was an iconic figure even then." Hurst achieved success as a producer, working with Marc Bolan and Cat Stevens. In the early 1970s, he teamed up with former Seeker Keith Potger to launch Springfield Revival, a more contemporary version of the Springfields. The line-up consisted of Australian singer-songwriter Mick Flinn (vocals, guitar, kazoo), formerly of the Mixtures, plus two Britons: Donna Jones (vocals), from Manchester, and former stage musical actor Ray Hoskins, alias Ray Martin (vocals, guitar), from London. This group supported the Osmonds on tour and made two albums for Polydor in the UK and one for MGM in the US, but without any chart success. Jones and Flinn became members of the New Seekers.

== Personnel ==
The Springfields personnel
(1960–1961)	Dusty Springfield – vocals; Tom Springfield – vocals, guitar; Tim Feild – vocals, guitar
(1962–1963)	Dusty Springfield – vocals; Tom Springfield – vocals, guitar; Mike Hurst – vocals, guitar
21st Century "revival"
(2017–present)	Alice Pitt-Carter – vocals; Andy Marlow – 12 string guitar; Mike Hurst – vocals, guitar

== Discography ==
=== Original studio albums ===
Year	Album	US	Label
1962	Kinda Folksy	—	Philips
1962	Silver Threads and Golden Needles (US only)	91	Philips
1963	Folk Songs from the Hills	–	Philips

=== EPs ===
Year	Album	US	Label
1961	The Springfields	–	Philips
1962	Kinda Folksy Number One	–	Philips
1962	Kinda Folksy Number Two	–	Philips
1962	Kinda Folksy Number Three	–	Philips
1962	Christmas with the Springfields	–	Woman's Own
1963	Hit Sounds	-	Philips
1963	Christmas with the Springfields	–	Philips

=== Singles ===
Year	Single	Chart Positions							Album
Year	Single	UK	New Musical Express	Melody Maker	Australia	Irish Charts	US	US Country	Album
1961	"Dear John"	—	_	_	_	_	—	—	singles only
1961	"Breakaway"	31	23	31	_	_	—	—	singles only
1961	"Bambino"	16	25	17	_	_	—	—	singles only
1962	"Goodnight Irene"	—	_	_	_	_	—	—	singles only
1962	"Silver Threads and Golden Needles"	—	_	_	1	_	20	16	Silver Threads and Golden Needles
1962	"Dear Hearts and Gentle People"	—	_	_	_	_	95	—	Silver Threads and Golden Needles
1962	"Gotta Travel On"	—	_	_	_	_	114	—	Silver Threads and Golden Needles
1962	"Island of Dreams"	5	7	6	_	2	129	—	singles only
1963	"Say I Won't Be There"	5	5	4	_	_	—	—	singles only
1963	"Come on Home"	31	30	31	_	_	—	—	singles only
1964	"If I Was Down And Out"	—	_	_	_	_	—	—	singles only
1964	"O Holy Child"	—	_	_	_	_	—	—	singles only
