= Showaddywaddy =

British rock group

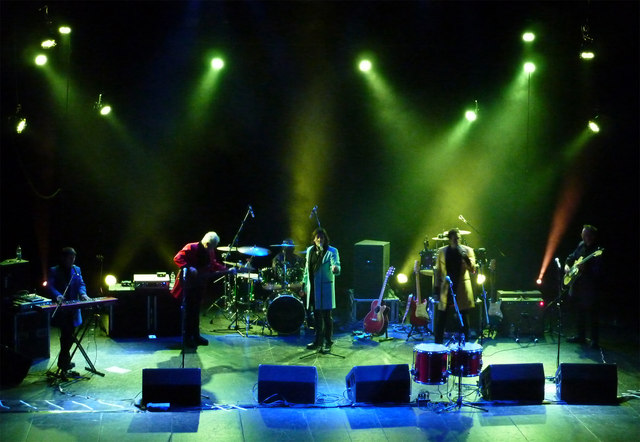
- Showaddywaddy in 2013

Background information
- Origin: Leicester, England
- Genre: Rock and roll
- Years active: 1973–present
- Labels: Bell, Arista, RCA
- Members: Romeo Challenger; Andy Pelos; Tom Bull; David Graham; Ed Handoll; Scott McGowan
- Past members: Malcolm Allured; Dave Bartram; Russ Field; Buddy Gask (deceased); Al James (deceased); Trevor Oakes (deceased); Ray Martinez; Danny Willson; Paul Dixon; Rod Deas; Rob Hewins; Dean Loach; Ray Hatfield; Billy Norman; Chris Savage; Billy Shannon; Sam Holland

Showaddywaddy are a rock and roll group from Leicester, England. They specialise in revivals of hit songs from the 1950s and early 1960s, while also issuing original material. They have spent 209 weeks on the UK Singles Chart, and have had 10 Top Ten singles, one reaching number one.

== Formation ==
The band was formed in 1973 by the amalgamation of two groups, Choise (Dave Bartram, Trevor Oakes, Al James and Romeo Challenger) and the Golden Hammers (Buddy Gask, Russ Field, Rod Deas and Malcolm Allured), the latter often known simply as The Hammers. They both played at the Fosse Way pub in Leicester, and soon discovered shared musical tastes. After playing together in jamming sessions, they joined together permanently, and Showaddywaddy were born. This led to an eight-member band, with the unusual feature of having two vocalists, two drummers, two guitarists, and two bassists. The band's first gig as professional musicians was at the Dreamland Ballroom in Margate, Kent, on 1 September 1973, although the first gigs under the Showaddywaddy name were in 1972.

Showaddywaddy won an edition of the ATV talent series New Faces on 17 November 1973, qualifying for the series' final. They were runners up in the "All Winners Final" broadcast on 29 December 1973. They have made nearly 300 television appearances, including their own BBC TV special, Showaddywaddyshow, broadcast on 30 December 1980, and repeated on 3 June 1981. The band also appeared in the 1975 film Three for All, in which they performed "The Party" from their 1974 debut album.

== Hits ==
Their first single, "Hey Rock and Roll" was written by the band, and released on 19 April 1974. It reached number two on the UK Singles Chart. Beginning with "Dancin' Party" (1977), the band produced their own records, with more cover versions including "I Wonder Why" (originally by Dion and the Belmonts), "Blue Moon" (based on the Marcels' interpretation) and the Curtis Lee song "Pretty Little Angel Eyes", co-written by Tommy Boyce. After their first single, Showaddywaddy went on to have a further 22 UK hits until late summer 1982. Their most recent chart single was "Who Put the Bomp", a number 37 hit in 1982, which they also promoted in their final Top of the Pops performance. In total they had ten top-ten singles, a solitary number one ("Under the Moon of Love" in 1976), and spent 209 weeks in the UK Singles Chart, including seven successive top-five entries. Their biggest-selling single was "Under the Moon of Love", which sold 985,000 copies.

They had most of their biggest hits with covers of songs from the 1950s and the early 1960s. These included "Three Steps to Heaven" (originally by Eddie Cochran in 1960), "Heartbeat" (originally written and recorded by Buddy Holly), "Under the Moon of Love" (originally a US hit for Curtis Lee in 1961, again co-written by Tommy Boyce), "When" (originally by the Kalin Twins), "You Got What It Takes" (originally by Marv Johnson) and "Dancin' Party" (originally by Chubby Checker). These six singles were all produced by Mike Hurst (a former member of the Springfields). On the South African chart, "Three Steps to Heaven" reached number 6 in 1975 and "Under the Moon of Love" number 6 in 1977.

== Later period ==
=== Departures and life after the band ===
A series of departures during the mid 1980s saw Malcolm Allured leave in 1984, followed by Russ Field in 1985 and Buddy Gask in 1987. After retiring from music, Gask moved to Spain in 2005. He died in 2011, having experienced ill health for several years.

The former members pursued different activities following their departures. Field and his wife ran a guest house in Beadnell, Northumberland, and he also played guitar in a local covers band, Before The Mast. Allured moved into the pub and nightclub trade, establishing MFN (Miles From Nowhere), a music and biker venue at Shipley Gate, Derbyshire. He also continued to perform with local bands.

Field's departure in 1985 led to his replacement by Ray Martinez, who remained with the group until 1995, when he was succeeded by Danny Willson.

=== Recordings and reissues ===
From 2000, Cherry Red Records began reissuing Showaddywaddy's back catalogue on CD through its 7Ts imprint. The releases included previously unavailable CD editions of the original albums, supplemented by bonus material. The 2002 reissue of Trocadero, for example, added three tracks, including the B-side "Teenage Love Affair" and the singles "Under the Moon of Love" and "Lucy Jane".

In 2008, Showaddywaddy recorded The Sun Album (I Betcha Gonna Like It), completing the sessions at Sun Studio in Memphis in February. A limited-edition box set of 500 copies was offered for pre-order, comprising the album, a special booklet and a bonus DVD.

During this period, several members also began leaving the touring line up. Al James retired in December 2008, playing his final concert at the Cheese & Grain in Frome, Somerset, on 20 December. Trevor Oakes subsequently took a break from performing because of ill health before officially retiring on 1 May 2009; his final appearance had been at the same venue. Danny Willson also departed in 2009 to join Martin Turner's Wishbone Ash, playing his final Showaddywaddy concert in Denmark on 8 August.

In September 2011, lead singer Dave Bartram released a collection of solo recordings made between 1982 and 1985. The seventeen-track album, Lost and Found, was issued by Invisible Hands Music after the original tapes had remained in his loft for 25 years.

=== Bartram's departure and the 40th anniversary ===
After 38 years as the band's frontman, Bartram left Showaddywaddy on 3 December 2011. His final concert took place at the Kings Hall Theatre in Ilkley, West Yorkshire. He continued as the group's manager, a position he had held since 1984. The Ilkley performance also marked the departure of saxophonist David Graham, who had toured with the band since August 2009, although he subsequently returned in 2020.

Showaddywaddy marked their 40th anniversary in 2013 with a UK tour running from 11 January to 1 June. The celebrations also included the release, on 17 June, of a ten CD anthology documenting the band's recorded output. Spanning their 20th century catalogue, the 139 track collection brought together the original studio albums in miniature vinyl replica sleeves, non album A-sides and B-sides, alternative mixes and previously unreleased recordings. It was accompanied by a 36 page booklet featuring a 7,000 word account by band expert Steve Thorpe and an introduction by Bartram.

June 2013 also saw the release of the band's first live album. Featuring 16 of their best known songs, it was sold exclusively at concerts and limited to 1,000 copies.

Following his departure, Bartram made his first solo post band appearance on 1 November 2013 at Upstairs At The Western, above The Western pub in Leicester. The event took the form of an interview and audience Q&A session, during which he also performed three acoustic songs: "Smiling Eyes", "Three Steps To Heaven" and "Hey Rock And Roll". The performance of "Smiling Eyes" was its first live rendition, almost 38 years after its original release on the 1975 album Step Two.

=== Subsequent line-up changes ===
Further changes to the line up followed in the second half of the decade. Rod Deas retired in early 2019 after his final concert at The Qube in Corby on 25 January. Bartram returned to the stage to deliver a farewell speech before the second set. In January 2020, the band's line-up included guitarist Ray Hatfield, keyboardist Dean Loach and bassist Billy Norman. All three musicians left the group during the summer of 2020. Former guitarist Danny Willson returned in September 2021 on a temporary basis.

Despite these changes, Showaddywaddy continued to tour extensively, performing approximately 100 dates annually across the UK and Europe. They topped Ents24's annual ranking of the UK's hardest-working music acts in both 2015 and 2016, becoming the first act to hold the position for two consecutive years.The group has also continued to undertake larger-scale touring engagements, including the "Once In A Lifetime" arena tour in June 2014, alongside Bay City Rollers, David Essex and The Osmonds. That month, The Sun Album (I Betcha Gonna Like It) was also reissued with two additional tracks.

The current line-up (November 2026) consists of Romeo Challenger, the only remaining original member, alongside vocalist Andy Pelos, bassist Tom Bull, vocalist and guitarist Ed Handoll, David Graham saxophonist and guitarist, and guitarist Scott McGowan.

== Band members ==
Adapted from biographies on band's official website.

- Original members listed in **bold**

=== Current ===
- **Romeo Challenger** (born 19 May 1950, St John's, Antigua, West Indies) — drums (1973–present)
- Andy Pelos — vocals / guitar (2012–present)
- David Graham — saxophone (2009–2011) — guitar / saxophone / bass (2020–present)
- Tom Bull — bass guitar (2020–present)
- Ed Handoll — guitar / vocals (2024–present)
- Scott McGowan - guitar (2026-present)

=== Former ===
- **Malcolm "Duke" Allured** (born 27 August 1945, Leicester) — drums / vocals (1973–1984)
- **Dave Bartram** (born 23 March 1952, Leicester) — vocals (1973–2011)
- **Rod Deas** (born 13 February 1948, Scarborough) — bass (1973–2019)
- **Russ Field** (born James Lewis Russell Field, 1 September 1949, Berwick-upon-Tweed) — guitar (1973–1985)
- **Buddy Gask** (born William George Gask, 18 December 1945, Leicester – 7 June 2011, Spain) — vocals (1973–1987)
- **Al James** (born Geoffrey Betts, 13 January 1946, Leicester – 16 November 2018) — bass / vocals (1973–2008)
- **Trevor Oakes** (born Trevor Leslie Oakes, 9 September 1946, Leicester – 18 February 2026) — guitar (1973–2009)
- Ray Martinez — guitar (1985–1995)
- Danny Willson — guitar (1995–2009/2021)
- Paul Dixon — guitars / vocals (2008–2017)
- Rob Hewins - drums / guitar (2012-2021)
- Dean Loach — keyboards / guitar / backing vocals (2012–2020)
- Ray Hatfield — guitar / vocals (2017–2020)
- Billy Norman — bass guitar / backing vocals (2018–2020)
- Chris Savage — keyboards (2020–2021)
- Billy Shannon — guitar / vocals (2021–2024)
- Sam Holland — guitar / drums (2021–2026)

Timeline

== Discography ==
- Showaddywaddy (1974)
- Step Two (1975)
- Trocadero (1976)
- Red Star (1977)
- Crepes & Drapes (1979)
- Bright Lights (1980)
- Good Times (1981)
- Living Legends (1983)
- Jump, Boogie & Jive (1991)
- The One & Only – Greatest & Latest (1996)
- Hey Rock 'n' Roll (2002)
- I Love Rock 'n' Roll (2006)
- The Sun Album (I Betcha Gonna Like It) (2008)
- Next Chapter (2016)
