= Curtis Lee =

American musician (1939–2015)

- Born: Curtis Edwin Lee; October 28, 1939; Yuma, Arizona, U.S.
- Died: January 8, 2015 (aged 75) Yuma, Arizona, U.S.
- Genres: Doo-wop; pop
- Occupations: Musician; songwriter
- Instrument: Vocals
- Years active: 1960–1968

Curtis Edwin Lee (October 28, 1939 – January 8, 2015) was an American singer and songwriter. He is known for his early 1960s hits "Pretty Little Angel Eyes" (US #7) and "Under the Moon of Love" (US #46), both of which were produced by Phil Spector.

== Career ==
Born in Yuma, Arizona, Lee began his recording career in 1959. He traveled to New York in 1960 to cut a demo for Dunes Records. He wrote some songs with Tommy Boyce, in this period. Lee's first three singles were "Special Love", "Pledge of Love", and "Pretty Little Angel Eyes". In the UK, "Pretty Little Angel Eyes" was a minor hit record, peaking at No. 47 in 1961. "Pretty Little Angel Eyes" has been covered by Zombina and the Skeletones and Showaddywaddy.

Without Spector's influence, Lee's hits dried up. He went into the construction industry with his father in 1969. He died from cancer on January 8, 2015, in Yuma, Arizona, aged 75.

== Singles ==
| Year | Single | Chart position | |
| Year | Single | US | Label |
|---|---|---|---|
| 1959 | "With All My Heart (I Love You)" | – | Warrior |
| 1959 | "Pure Love" | – | Warrior |
| 1961 | "Pledge Of Love" | 110 | Dunes |
| 1961 | "Pretty Little Angel Eyes" | 7 | Dunes |
| 1961 | "Under The Moon Of Love" | 46 | Dunes |
| 1962 | "Just Another Fool" | 110 | Dunes |
| 1966 | "Is She In Your Town" | – | Mira |
