= You Got What It Takes =

Single by Marv Johnson

from the album Marvelous Marv Johnson
- B-side: "Don't Leave Me"
- Released: 1959
- Recorded: 1959
- Genre: R&B
- Length: 2:30
- Label: United Artists
- Songwriters: Tyran Carlo, Gwen Fuqua, Berry Gordy Jr., Marv Johnson

Marv Johnson singles chronology
"I'm Coming Home" (1959)	"You Got What It Takes" (1959)	"I Love the Way You Love" (1960)

"You Got What It Takes" is a 1959 single by Marv Johnson. In the US it reached number 2 on the Black Singles chart, and number 10 on the Billboard Hot 100 early in 1960. In the UK Singles Chart it reached a high of number 7. The original recording of "You Got What It Takes" was by Bobby Parker on Vee-Jay 279 in 1958. Parker claims to have written the song, and his name is on the 1958 recording, but later versions credit Berry Gordy, Gwen Gordy, Billy Davis, and sometimes Marv Johnson.

Parker told the Forgotten Hits newsletter in 2008:

I wrote 'You've Got What It Takes,' that was MY song. Even had the Paul Hucklebuck Williams band playing on it behind me... And then Berry Gordy just stole it out from under me, just put his name on it. And what could I do? I was just trying to make a living, playing guitar and singing, how was I going to go on and fight Berry Gordy, big as he was, and Motown Records? There wasn't really nothing I could do about it – it was just too big and I didn't have any way to fight them...

== Other notable recordings ==
- A contemporary cover version by Johnny Kidd and the Pirates entered the UK charts the same week in 1960 as Marv Johnson's version and reached number 25.
- A 1967 cover of the song by the Dave Clark Five reached number 7 in the United States and number 28 in the UK.
- A rock and roll cover by Showaddywaddy reached number 2 in the UK in 1977.
- Anne Murray included a cover of the song on her 1979 album New Kind of Feeling.
