= Under the Moon of Love =

1961 song

Single by Curtis Lee
- B-side: "Beverly Jean"
- Released: 1961
- Recorded: 1961
- Genre: Pop
- Label: Dunes Records
- Songwriters: Curtis Lee, Tommy Boyce
- Producer: Phil Spector

"Under the Moon of Love"

Single by Showaddywaddy
- B-side: "Lookin' Back"
- Released: 15 October 1976
- Recorded: 1976
- Genre: Pop
- Label: Bell Records
- Songwriters: Curtis Lee, Tommy Boyce
- Producer: Mike Hurst

"Under the Moon of Love" is a song written by Tommy Boyce and Curtis Lee, and first recorded in 1961 by Curtis Lee. Produced by Phil Spector, Lee's recording was released on Dunes Records #45-2008, with the "B" side "Beverly Jean". It peaked on the Billboard Hot 100 at No. 46 on November 27, 1961.

== Showaddywaddy version ==
In 1976 the song was revived by rock and roll revival act Showaddywaddy and became a major hit in the UK. The Mike Hurst-produced version went on to spend three weeks at the top of the UK Singles Chart in December that year, and has since sold over a million copies in the UK. It was the band's last song to be released on Bell Records.

=== Showaddywaddy personnel ===
- Vocals: Dave Bartram
- Guitar: Russ Field
- Bass: Rod Deas
- Drums: Malcolm Allured
- Timpani: Romeo Challenger
- Trumpet: Mike Davis
- Saxophone: Jeff Daly

== Chart performance ==
=== Curtis Lee ===
Chart (1961)	Peak position
U.S. Billboard Hot 100	46
U.S. Cash Box Top 100	42

=== Showaddywaddy ===
Chart (1976–77)	Peak position
Australia (Kent Music Report)	53
Irish Singles Chart (IRMA)	6
South Africa (Springbok Radio)	6
UK Singles Chart (BMRB)	1

== Other version ==
In 1975, Mud covered the song for their album Use Your Imagination which reached No. 33 in the UK Albums Chart. It was also the B-side of their 1977 single, "Beating Around The Bush", which failed to chart.
