= De Lane Lea Studios =

British recording studio

Coordinates: 51°30′50″N 00°07′58″W

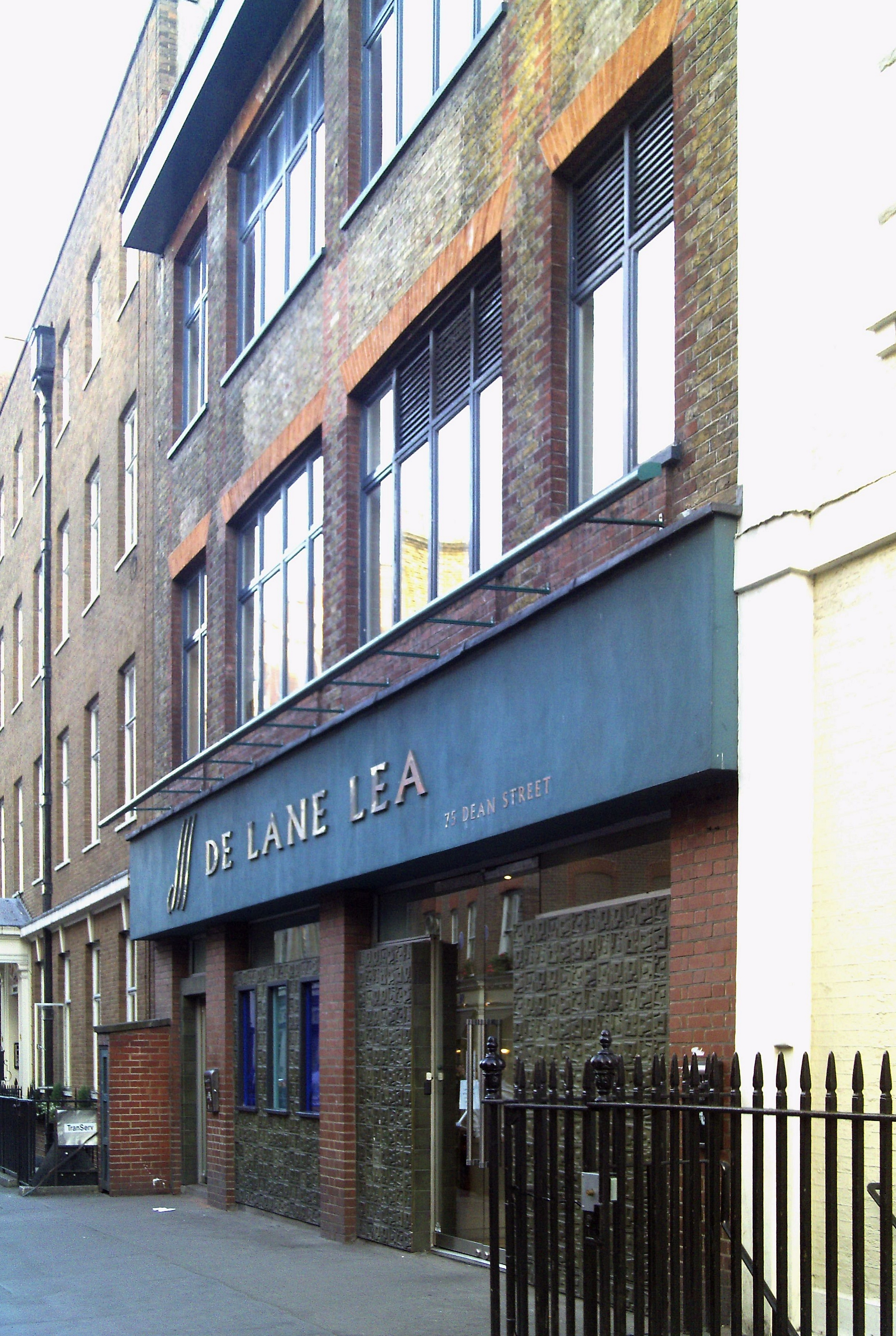
De Lane Lea Studios on Dean Street, 2009

Warner Bros. De Lane Lea Studios is a recording studio, based in Soho, London.

The studios have mainly been used for dubbing feature films and television programmes. Major artists including the Animals, the Beatles, Herman's Hermits, Soft Machine, Queen, the Rolling Stones, Bee Gees, the Who, the Jimi Hendrix Experience, Pink Floyd, Wishbone Ash, Renaissance, Electric Light Orchestra, Slade and Deep Purple recorded songs there, particularly at the studio's former premises at 129 Kingsway, Holborn, London, and at Engineers Way, Wembley, where Queen recorded demos in 1971.

Major William De Lane Lea, a French intelligence attaché for the British government, founded De Lane Lea Studios in 1947 to dub English films into French. The studios were adapted according to the demands of the market, and expanded significantly on various sites in the 1960s and 1970s. Music recording increased dramatically, and the growth of commercial radio and TV also led to new work in advertising. De Lane Lea was succeeded on his death in 1964 by his son Jacques, who was also a film producer, director and writer. He left the company in 1978.

Since the 1980s, De Lane Lea has specialized in sound post-production for cinema and television. It includes six individual studios, including Studio 1, the biggest in-town dubbing theatre with one of Europe's most powerful AMS Neve DFC mixing consoles, built on what was previously a TV studio and before that an orchestral recording studio. Recently the studios have been used for films by directors such as Nick Park, Tim Burton, Mike Newell, Guillermo del Toro and Chris Weitz.

Warner Bros. purchased the studios in November 2012. Under Warner Bros., De Lane Lea has opened a picture post-production division, specialising in colour grading, VFX and film mastering for cinema and high-end television, and also expanded by opening another post-production facility at Warner Bros. Studios Leavesden. In 2022, the studios relocated from their original location at 75 Dean Street to Ilona Rose House at 13A Greek Street.
