= Trevor Oakes =

English guitarist and songwriter (1946–2026)

- Born: Trevor Leslie Oakes; 9 September 1946; Leicester, England
- Died: 18 February 2026 (aged 79)
- Genres: Glam rock
- Occupations: Guitarist, songwriter
- Instrument: Guitar
- Years active: 1973–2008
- Formerly of: Showaddywaddy
- Relatives: Scott Oakes (son); Stefan Oakes (son)

Trevor Leslie Oakes (9 September 1946 – 18 February 2026) was an English glam rock guitarist and songwriter. He is best known for being the guitarist for band Showaddywaddy, of which he was a member from 1973 until 2009. Oakes was one of the main songwriters for the band, penning most of their minor hits and album track with lead singer Dave Bartram.

Oakes played saxophone on stage, although on the actual records the saxophone was played by session musician Jeff Daly. Trevor retired from the group in 2009, and played his last gig with the band in 2008. He was the father to footballers Scott and Stefan Oakes.

== Career ==
Oakes played in the group "Choise" who in 1973, were merged with the band "The Golden Hammers" to form Showaddywaddy. Choise consisted of Oakes, Dave Bartram, Al James, and Romeo Challenger, and The Hammers consisted of Buddy Gask, Russ Field, Rod Deas, and Malcolm Allured. Trevor and singer Dave Bartram penned many of their songs, although all eight members were credited as songwriters on the records.

They had most of their biggest hits with covers of songs from the 1950s and the early 1960s. These included "Three Steps to Heaven", "Heartbeat", "Under the Moon of Love", "When", "You Got What It Takes" and "Dancin' Party". They have spent 209 weeks on the UK Singles Chart, and have had 10 Top Ten singles, one reaching number one. Under the Moon of Love was their only single to reach number one in the UK.

Oakes decided to take a break from the band due to ill health in early 2009. He left the band and officially retired on 1 May 2009, his last gig with Showaddywaddy being at the Cheese & Grain in Frome, Somerset on 20 December 2008, where original bassist Al James also played his final gig before retiring.

== Personal life and death ==
Oakes was born in Leicester on 9 September 1946. He was a press knife maker by trade before he was in Showaddywaddy professionally. One of Oakes' interests was football, and on a few occasions between the 1970s and 1990s, he participated in the Showbiz XI celebrity charity football team.

Two of his sons, Scott Oakes and Stefan Oakes, were both professional footballers. In a 2014 interview, Oakes said that he had lived in Torquay, Devon with his partner Caroline, but later moved back to his native Leicester.

Oakes died on 18 February 2026, at the age of 79. His death was not announced until 28 March.
