= Al James (bassist) =

British bassist from Showaddywaddy

Geoffrey Betts, known as Al James, was a British bassist in the British rock and roll revival band Showaddywaddy.

== Early life ==
James was born in 1945 or 1946. He learned to play guitar and bass guitar at age 13.

== Career ==
James began his musical career in the group Choise, composed of James, guitarist Trevor Oakes, singer Dave Bartram, and drummer Romeo Challenger. The group released a song in 1969.

In 1973, James co-founded Showaddywaddy. He served as the band's second bassist, as well as a backing singer along with Buddy Gask. He occasionally sang lead vocals, including on “King Of The Jive” (1974), “Rocker Boots” (1975), “Record Machine” (1976), “Superstar” (1977), “Feelin’” (1977), “Teen Canteen” (1980) and “Do It Again” (1982), and also on a cover of “Say Mama” (1976) and "Hound Dog".

In 1981, James, Buddy Gask, and Malcolm Allured were all in a band called Burglar's Dog. James wrote the B-side to one of their songs, "Mississippi". His favourite bass guitars to perform with were the Fender Jazz and Danelectro Longhorn Bass.

James' retirement was announced during a gig at the Cheese & Grain club in Frome on 20 December 2008. In a January 2018 interview, James said, "It just felt like it was the right time to call it a day".

== Personal life ==
James had two daughters and a son.

Near the end of his life, James had cancer multiple times, weakening his body. In late October 2018, he fell from the top of the stairs in his Market Harborough home, sustaining serious injuries. Because he lived alone, he wasn't found until several hours after the fall. He died at Kettering General Hospital on 16 November 2018 at age 72. His funeral was held at St John the Baptist Church in Billesdon. Showaddywaddy members Dave Bartram, Trevor Oakes, and Romeo Challenger helped carry his coffin, which was brought into the church while the song "Hotel California" by Eagles was playing.
