= Mike Hurst (producer) =

- Born: Michael John Longhurst Pickworth; 19 September 1942 (age 83); Kilburn, London, England
- Occupations: Musician, record producer
- Instrument: Guitar
- Years active: 1960s–present
- Website: mikehurst.co.uk

Mike Hurst (born Michael John Longhurst Pickworth, 19 September 1942) is an English musician and record producer.

== Biography ==
A singer, songwriter and guitarist from the age of 13, Mike Hurst was encouraged by rock singer Eddie Cochran after auditioning for Jack Good's television show Oh Boy! but in 1960, after failing to secure a recording contract, Hurst moved away from music and began to work in insurance. Later, though, after his mother answered an advertisement in The Stage, on his behalf, for a singer for a pop/folk group, Hurst won an audition. He joined Dusty and Tom Springfield in The Springfields in February 1962.

After entering the UK Singles Chart with "Breakaway", they scored a hit single in the United States with "Silver Threads and Golden Needles", becoming the first UK vocal group to make the US Top 20. UK chart success continued in 1963 with "Island of Dreams" and "Say I Won't Be There". They were voted the top British group by readers of the NME in 1962. The Springfields' final performance was in Sunday Night at the London Palladium, the biggest television programme of the day, where they were presented with a trophy by compere Bruce Forsyth.

The group disbanded in October 1963. In 1964, Hurst formed a band called the Methods, featuring Jimmy Page and then Albert Lee on guitar as well as Tony Ashton on keyboards. After leaving the band Hurst began producing for Andrew Loog Oldham (Tony Rivers and the Castaways) and Mickie Most. In September 1965, he oversaw Marc Bolan's first recording session, at Decca when he recorded "The Wizard".

In 1965, after a brief collaboration with Bolan, he discovered singer-songwriter Cat Stevens, and signed him to the new Deram record label (an imprint of Decca) and produced his first five hit singles including "Matthew and Son" and "I'm Gonna Get Me a Gun". During this time he also produced recordings and hits for P. P. Arnold ("The First Cut Is the Deepest"), The Move ("Curly"), Manfred Mann ("Mighty Quinn"), Spencer Davis Group ("Time Seller"), Neil MacArthur (a pseudonym for Colin Blunstone), Warm Sounds, Ayshea and Alan Bown. In 1969, Hurst formed an orchestra and recorded covers of popular songs and themes of the day.

In 1970 and 1971, he produced for Australian band New World, and recorded two albums for Capitol Records, using sidemen such as Tony Ashton, B. J. Cole, Clem Cattini, Ian Paice, Jon Lord, Rod Argent and Nicky Hopkins. In 1973, he formed his own production company, Solid Gold, and wrote and produced for the band Fancy, achieving US chart success with the singles "Touch Me" and a cover of The Troggs "Wild Thing". The same year he signed Showaddywaddy to Bell Records and produced a string of UK hit singles for them. These included "Under the Moon of Love", "Three Steps to Heaven" and "When".

Following his success with Showaddywaddy, he produced Modern Priscilla (1978), a disco album for Cilla Black, and early recordings by Bruce Woolley and the Camera Club. In 1978, he started managing Shakin' Stevens, and produced his first hit "Hot Dog" the same year. In 1981, he formed a vocal group with Mary Hopkin and Mike de Albuquerque called Sundance and toured with Dr Hook appearing on the Parkinson and Russell Harty television shows. In 1984, he became head of Lamborghini Records, famous for discovering Samantha Fox.

21st century work includes production for Belle and Sebastian (2002), and his son's band, Jonas and Plunkett (2007). He also runs rock schools for youngsters through his Rockmaster company, and is a foremost lecturer on the history of English speaking popular music from the Middle Ages to the present day, appearing at schools, U3A groups etc. throughout the country. Hurst also appears with his new Springfields, including Andy Marlow and Alice Pitt-Carter.

Hurst and wife Marjorie have seven children between them – Tim (died 2024), Alexis, Caroline, Muffin, Bryony, Jonas, and Adam – and 17 grandchildren.
