= Romeo Challenger =

- Born: Romeo Alexander Challenger; 19 May 1950 (age 76); St. John's, Antigua, British Leeward Islands
- Origin: Leicester, England
- Genres: Rock
- Occupation: Musician
- Instrument: Drums
- Years active: 1971–present

Romeo Alexander Challenger (born 19 May 1950) is an Antiguan-born English musician. He has been the drummer for the rock band Showaddywaddy since 1973, and also played with progressive rock band Black Widow.

== Biography ==
Challenger was born 19 May 1950 in St. John's, Antigua, British Leeward Islands. In 1955, he moved with his family to England. He began playing the drums as a teenager in the mid-1960s.

He played in several groups, including progressive rock/hard rock band Black Widow in the early 1970s. In 1973, he became one of two drummers (alongside Malcolm Allured) for the rock and roll band Showaddywaddy. Showaddywaddy had ten singles reach the top ten of the UK Singles Chart, including the 1976 number-one "Under the Moon of Love".

Challenger played in the Leicester Boys' football team with Peter Shilton and Jeff Blockley, who both went on to enjoy professional careers.

Challenger is the father of high jumper Ben Challenger, who won a silver medal in the 1998 Commonwealth Games, and a bronze medal four years later; and Tamzin Challenger, a musician best known for her material with bassline producer T2.
