= Not Too Young =

Not Too Young may refer to:

== Music ==
- "Not Too Young", song by Clique Girlz and the original title of their album Incredible
- "Not Too Young", song by Mandy Moore from So Real
- "Not Too Young", song by Sabina Ddumba
- "Not Too Young", song by Jekalyn Carr
- "Not Too Young to Get Married", song by Bob B. Soxx & the Blue Jeans
- "Not Too Young", song by Icona Pop
