= Darlene Love =

American singer and actress (born 1941)

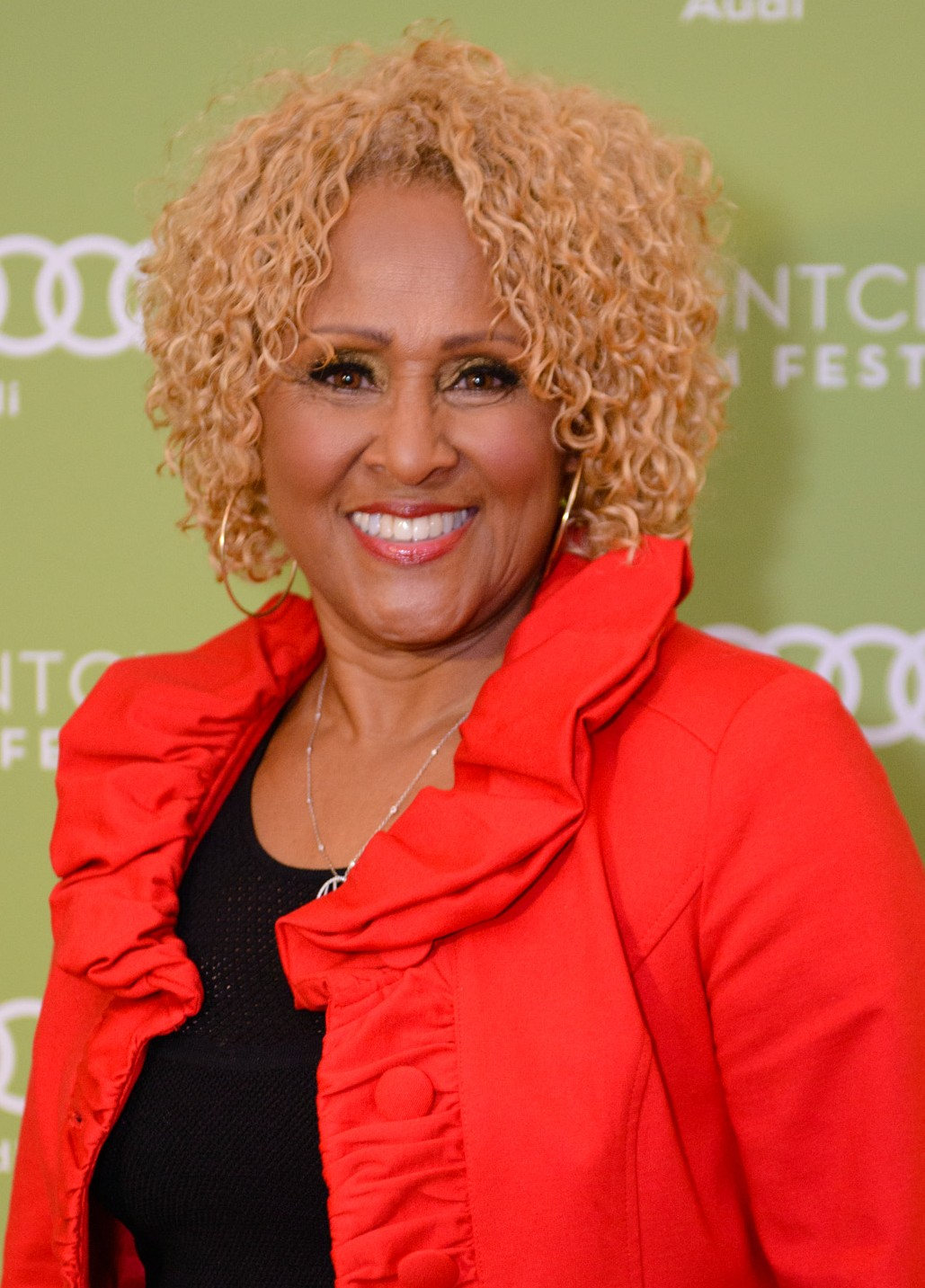
- Love at the 2013 Montclair Film Festival

Background information
- Born: Darlene Wright; July 26, 1941 (age 85); Los Angeles, California, U.S.
- Genres: Soul; R&B; jazz; pop; rock
- Occupations: Singer; actress
- Years active: 1959–present
- Labels: Philles; OKeh; Warner-Spector

Darlene Wright (born July 26, 1941^{[a]}), known professionally as Darlene Love, is an American R&B and soul singer and actress. She was the lead singer of the girl group the Blossoms and also a solo recording artist.

She began singing as a child with her local church choir. In 1962, she began recording with producer Phil Spector who renamed her Darlene Love. She sang lead on "He's a Rebel" and "He's Sure the Boy I Love", which were credited to the Crystals. She was soon a highly sought-after vocalist and worked with many rock and soul musicians of the 1960s, including Sam Cooke, Dionne Warwick, Bill Medley, the Beach Boys, Elvis Presley, Tom Jones and Sonny and Cher. As an actress, Love performed in various Broadway productions. She had a recurring role as Roger Murtaugh's wife in the Lethal Weapon film series.

Love was invited annually by David Letterman to sing the song "Christmas (Baby Please Come Home)" on his late night television talk show just prior to the Christmas holidays. These performances started in 1986 on NBC's Late Night with David Letterman and continued on CBS's Late Show with David Letterman until 2014; Letterman called Love the "Christmas Queen". Although Letterman has since retired, Love has continued the tradition in the years since.

Ranked among Rolling Stone's 100 Greatest Singers, Love was inducted into the Rock and Roll Hall of Fame in 2011. Love is featured in the Oscar-winning documentary film 20 Feet from Stardom (2013), for which she won a Grammy Award.

== Early life ==
Love was born Darlene Wright on July 26, 1941, in Los Angeles, to Ellen Maddox and Reverend Joe Wright. Her younger sister Edna Wright grew up to be the lead singer of the group Honey Cone. She grew up mostly in Los Angeles, but also spent a few years of her youth in Texas.

As a minister's daughter, she grew up listening to gospel music and was a dedicated member of her church. Wright began singing with her local church choir at age ten in Hawthorne, California. During choir practice she caught the attention of choir director Cora Martin-Moore. After singing for Martin-Moore she was asked to go to the Music Mart where she sang and did some broadcasts. As it was her first musical experience, it was also the main influence for her to pursue a music career.

== Music career ==
=== Early career ===
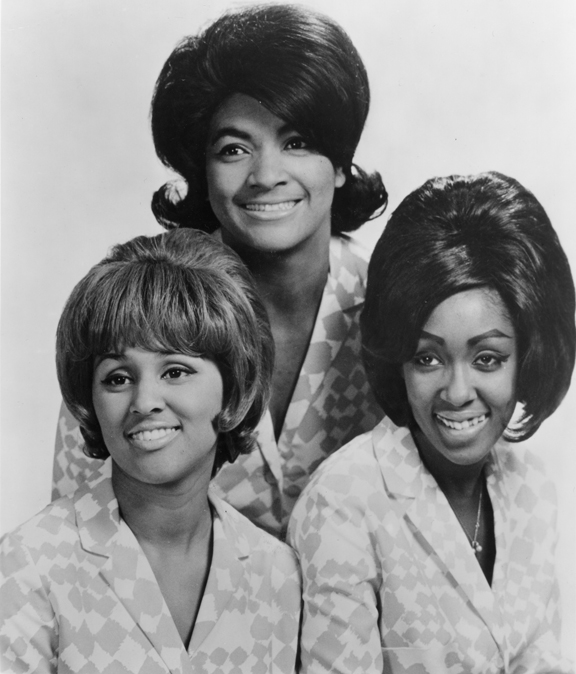
The Blossoms in 1966. Left to right: Darlene Love, Fanita James, Jean King

While still in high school (1957) she sang with the Echoes, a mixed gender doo-wop group. She was then invited to join a little-known girl group called the Blossoms.

In 1962, the Blossoms were hired to sing on a session by producer Phil Spector. His girl group, the Crystals, could not make it to Los Angeles in time for the session, so Wright was paid $5,000 to sing lead on "He's a Rebel". This was Wright's first time on a Spector recording. The single, credited to the Crystals, was hurriedly released by Spector on Philles Records to get his version of the Gene Pitney song onto the market before that of Vikki Carr. The ghost release of this single came as a total surprise to the Crystals who were an experienced and much traveled girl harmony group in their own right, but they were nevertheless required to perform and promote the new single on television and on tour as if it were their own. The single reached No. 1 on the Billboard Hot 100 in November 1962.

Following the release of "He's a Rebel", Wright signed a deal with Spector, who renamed her Darlene Love. She recorded "He's Sure the Boy I Love", which she thought would be released under her name, but Spector credited it to the Crystals. Cynthia Weil, who co-wrote the song with her husband Barry Mann, was unaware that Love had sung on the track: "It all came out later. I think it was a terrible thing to do to her." Spector had Love sing "Da Doo Ron Ron" in the studio, but he decided to record it with another singer at the last minute.

Love recorded the track "Christmas (Baby Please Come Home)" for the 1963 holiday compilation album, A Christmas Gift for You from Phil Spector. The song was written by Jeff Barry and Ellie Greenwich, along with Phil Spector, with the intention of being sung by Ronnie Spector of the Ronettes. According to Love, Ronnie Spector was not able to put as much emotion into the song as needed. Instead, Love was brought into the studio to record the song, which became a large success over time and Love's signature tune.

As a member of the Blossoms, Love contributed backing vocals behind many of the biggest hits of the 1960s including the Ronettes' "Be My Baby", Shelley Fabares' "Johnny Angel", Bobby "Boris" Pickett's "Monster Mash", Frank Sinatra's version of "That's Life", and the Crystals' "Da Doo Ron Ron". The Blossoms recorded singles, usually with little success, on Capitol 1957–58 [pre-Darlene Love], Challenge 1961–62, OKeh 1963, Reprise 1966–67, Ode 1967, MGM 1968, Bell 1969–70, and Lion 1972.

As a solo artist, Love also contributed backing vocals to the Ronettes' "Baby, I Love You". She was also part of a trio called Bob B. Soxx & the Blue Jeans, who recorded Spector's version of "Zip-a-Dee-Doo-Dah", an Oscar-winning song from the 1946 Walt Disney film Song of the South, which got into the Top 10 in 1963.

The Blossoms landed a weekly part on Shindig!, one of the top music shows of the era. They also appeared on Johnny Rivers' hits, including "Poor Side of Town", "Baby I Need Your Loving" and "The Tracks of My Tears". The Blossoms were part of the Elvis Presley's '68 Comeback Special, which aired on NBC. Love and the Blossoms sang backup for Sharon Marie (Esparza) (a Brian Wilson act), as well as John Phillips' solo album John, Wolfking of L.A., recorded in 1969.

Into the 1970s, Love continued to work as a backup singer, before taking a break in order to raise a family. In 1973, she recorded vocals as a cheerleader along with Michelle Phillips, for the Cheech & Chong single "Basketball Jones", which peaked at No. 15 on the Billboard Hot 100 singles chart.

=== 1980s return ===
Love returned to music in the early 1980s and to an appreciative audience she thought might have long since forgotten her. She had been performing at venues like the Roxy in Los Angeles, and it was a conversation with Steven Van Zandt that greased the wheels for her to go to New York and begin performing there in 1982, at places like The Bottom Line. She also sang "OOO Wee Baby" in the 1980 movie The Idolmaker. Along with performing in small venues, Love worked as a maid in Beverly Hills. One day while she was cleaning one of these homes, she heard her song "Christmas (Baby Please Come Home)" on the radio. She took this as a sign that she needed to change her life and go back to singing.

In the mid-1980s, she portrayed herself in the Tony Award-nominated jukebox musical Leader of the Pack, which featured the rock and roll songs written by Ellie Greenwich, many of them for the young Love. The showstopping number of that show, "River Deep - Mountain High", had been recorded by Phil Spector with Ike & Tina Turner. Leader of the Pack commenced as a revue at the Greenwich Village nightclub The Bottom Line, as did the later show about Love's life, Portrait of a Singer, which never made the move uptown. Portrait included covers of "A Change Is Gonna Come" and "Don't Make Me Over", as well as "River Deep, Mountain High" and original music from some of the instrumental writers of early rock and roll, including Barry Mann and Cynthia Weil. Love contributed a cover of the Hollywood Argyles song "Alley Oop" to the soundtrack of the 1984 film Bachelor Party.

In 1986, Love's second chance came when she was asked to sing "Christmas (Baby Please Come Home)" on David Letterman's Christmas show, which became a yearly tradition.

In 1987, Love sang backup for U2's remake of "Christmas (Baby Please Come Home)".

=== Later career ===
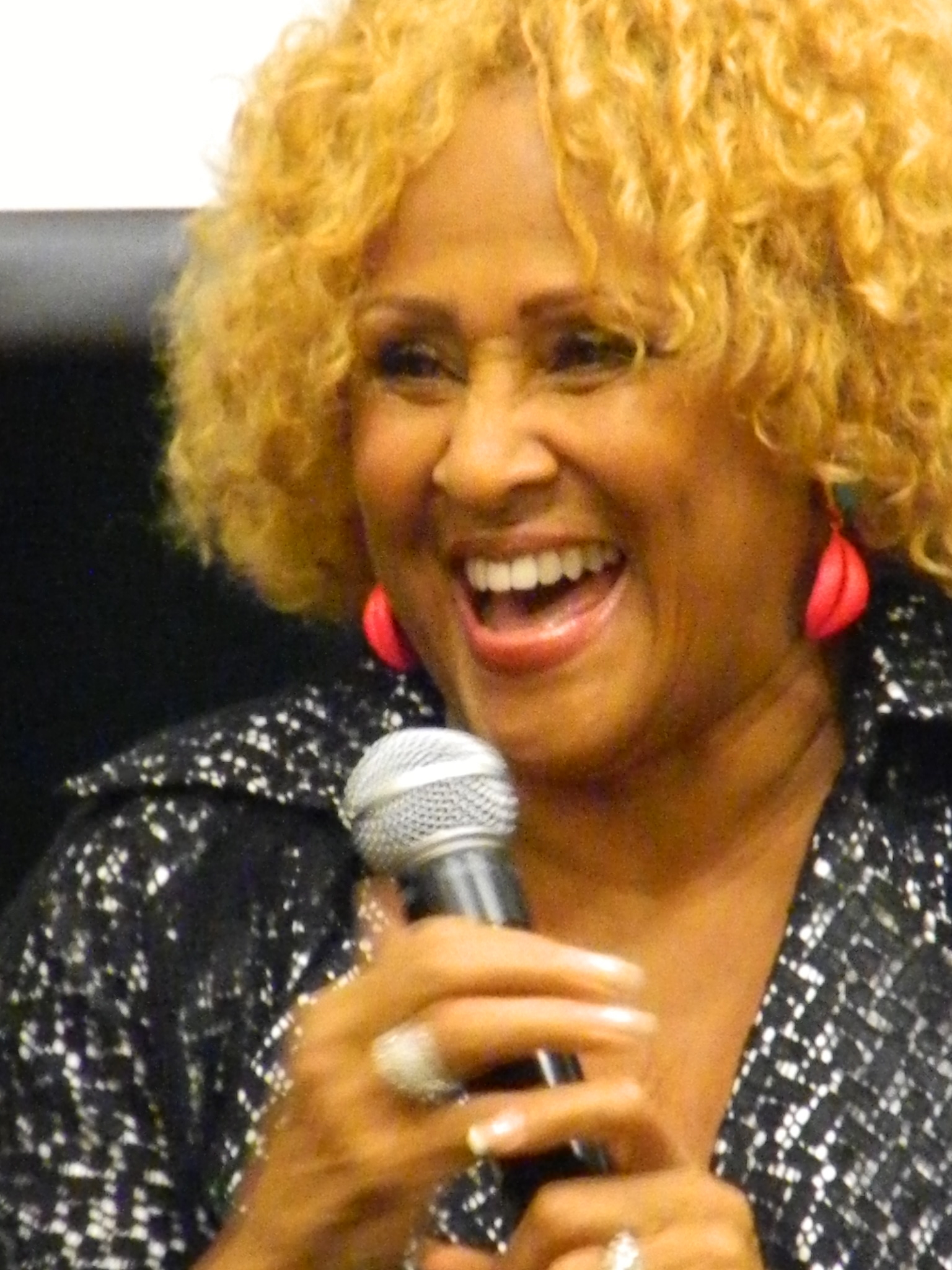
Love engaging the audience at Barnes & Noble Tribeca, June 2013

In 1988, Love released the album Paint Another Picture, which included an update of her old hit "He's Sure the Man I Love", by Mann and Weill, as well as a ballad written especially for her, "I've Never Been the Same", by Judy Wieder. The album did not make the US charts. In 1990, Cher invited Love and her sister Edna Wright as her background vocalists for the Heart of Stone Tour. Love released a minor single in 1992 with "All Alone on Christmas", written by Steven Van Zandt, which can be found on the Home Alone 2: Lost in New York soundtrack. The song was also included in the British film Love Actually. Love also contributed vocals to the soundtrack of the film Jingle All the Way.

In 1993, Love sued Spector for unpaid royalties and was awarded $250,000.

Love, alongside Rob Hoerburger, editor and writer for the New York Times, wrote her autobiography titled My Name Is Love, published in 1998. In the memoir, Love writes about her life in the music industry, her years of struggle, and her present projects.

Love continues to do a Christmas show every year in New York City, which is always capped by "Christmas (Baby Please Come Home)". In 2007, she released It's Christmas of Course, an album of Christmas-themed cover versions including "Happy Xmas (War is Over)" by John Lennon and Yoko Ono and "Thanks for Christmas" by XTC. Love performed with Bruce Springsteen and the E-Street Band in November 2009 at the Rock and Roll Hall of Fame 25th Anniversary Concert at Madison Square Garden.

Love was the musical guest on Late Show with David Letterman on May 7, 2007, performing "River Deep-Mountain High".

Love is featured in the documentary film 20 Feet from Stardom (2013), which premiered at the Sundance Film Festival and went on to win the Oscar for Best Documentary at the 86th Academy Awards. 20 Feet from Stardom also won the 2015 Grammy Award for Best Music Film, with the award being presented to the featured artists as well as the production crew.

Love recorded a duet, "He's Sure the Boy I Love", with Bette Midler on the latter's 2014 studio album It's the Girls!, a collection of songs paying tribute to girl groups.

In August 2014, the Oprah Winfrey Network (OWN) announced their intention to develop a film based on Love's life, starring singer Toni Braxton. However, no further news has surfaced about this proposal.

Love's most recent album, Introducing Darlene Love, was released September 18, 2015, on Steve Van Zandt's label, Wicked Cool Records. There are 10 songs on the album, including two new songs by Bruce Springsteen, and covers of Joan Jett and Elvis Costello songs, among others. In 2016, Love began touring her new album across the United States.

Love recorded her first solo video concert on February 23, 2010, at the NJPAC. Darlene Love – The Concert of Love was released as a CD and DVD later that year. The concert was also broadcast on select public television stations.

In 2023, Love reunited with Cher to sing "Christmas (Baby Please Come Home)" on Cher's album Christmas. She also performed the song in the 2025 Macy's Thanksgiving Day Parade.

== Acting career ==
In the late 1980s and also in the 1990s, Love also began an acting career, playing Trish Murtaugh, the wife of Danny Glover's character, in the four Lethal Weapon movies.

Love has held many star roles in various Broadway productions. She acted and sang in Grease, in the short-lived musical adaptation of Stephen King's Carrie, and starred as Motormouth Maybelle in Broadway's Hairspray from August 2005 till April 2008. She later reprised the role in the Hollywood Bowl production of the show in 2011.

In 2019, she appeared in the Netflix original movie Holiday Rush.

In 2020, she appeared and sang in the Netflix original movie The Christmas Chronicles 2.

== Christmas television performances ==
Love performed the song "Christmas (Baby Please Come Home)" on the last pre-Christmas episode of Late Night with David Letterman (NBC) which aired December 10, 1986, and then annually (with the exception of 2007) on Late Show with David Letterman (CBS) beginning with (air date) December 23, 1994. Her final Christmas appearance was on December 19, 2014, nine days after the official announcement that the show's finale would be in May 2015. Letterman has stated that the annual performance is his favorite part of Christmas. She was dubbed by Letterman as the "Christmas Queen". Love appeared in a reunion short with Letterman on his YouTube channel in 2023, again performing the song.

Due to the 2007 Writers Guild of America strike, Love was unable to perform on the Letterman show in 2007; a repeat of her 2006 performance was shown instead. From 2015 until 2023, Love performed the song annually on ABC's The View, only skipping out the 2021 edition due to being exposed to a positive COVID-19 case resulting in a quarantine; a compilation of her previous performances was shown instead. She has usually performed the song as a duet, being joined by Patti LaBelle in 2016, Fantasia in 2017, and Bryan Adams in 2018. Love also performed "Christmas (Baby Please Come Home)" in season six, episode 10 of the Fox television series New Girl (2016).

Love was a special guest on the December 17, 2005, broadcast of Saturday Night Live, singing "White Christmas" with the SNL band and providing the vocals for a Robert Smigel cartoon entitled "Christmastime for the Jews".

In November 2023, Love, in a duet with Cher, performed "Christmas (Baby Please Come Home)" at the Rockefeller Center Christmas Tree lighting ceremony. Love also performed solo on "A Marshmallow World" at the event.

Beginning in 2024, Love returned to late night television with the song, performing it on The Tonight Show Starring Jimmy Fallon accompanied by Little Steven and the Disciples of Soul and Paul Shaffer.

== Personal life ==
Love has been married three times and has four children. She married Leonard Peete in 1959. She had two sons with him: Marcus (b. 1961) and Chawn (b. 1964), and a daughter, Rosalynn, who died shortly after birth. They divorced in 1968. She married Wesley Mitchell in 1971, had a son, Jason Davion (b. 1974), and later divorced. Love married Alton Allison on June 28, 1984, in Teaneck, New Jersey, and they reside in Rockland County, New York.

Love was close to fellow American soul singers Dionne Warwick, Dee Dee Warwick and Cissy Houston, all of whom she met in the mid-1960s. After relocating to the East Coast in the early 1970s, she frequently collaborated with the trio, most notably as one of Dionne Warwick's background singers along with Warwick's sister Dee Dee during her 1970s concerts.

In addition, while staying over at Cissy Houston's suburban home in East Orange, New Jersey, Love befriended Houston's eight-year-old daughter Whitney. Cissy later made Love Houston's godmother. Love and Whitney remained close up until Whitney's untimely death in 2012.

== Awards and honors ==
In 1995, Love received the Rhythm and Blues Foundation's Pioneer Award.

In 2008, Love was ranked No. 84 on Rolling Stone's 100 Greatest Singers list.

On March 14, 2011, Love was inducted into the Rock and Roll Hall of Fame, with a speech by Bette Midler. Midler said "she changed my view of the world, listening to those songs, you had to dance, you had to move, you had to keep looking for the rebel boy". Near tears, Love noted that she would turn 70 later that year, and thanked Spector "for recognizing my talent and making me the main voice in his Wall of Sound". Her speech elicited a standing ovation. Later, she sang "Zip-a-Dee-Doo-Dah" with Bruce Springsteen providing a guitar solo.

In 2015, Love won her first Grammy Award for Best Music Film for the documentary 20 Feet From Stardom.

In 2015, Love was featured in the September issue of Entertainment Weekly. In the music section of the magazine, it introduced Love's five decades of musical accomplishments, such as different solos and albums.

Love provided the inaugural performance to christen the opening of the Clermont Performing Arts Center in Clermont, Florida on September 26, 2015.

In December 2025, Love was inaugurated onto the Count Basie Center for the Arts Walk of Fame in Red Bank, New Jersey.

Darlene Love: I Know Where I've Been, a feature documentary about Love by Canadian filmmaker Barry Avrich, is slated to premiere at the 2026 Toronto International Film Festival.

== Discography ==
=== Solo albums ===
Title	Year	Peak chart positions		
Title	Year	US	US R&B	US Heat.
Paint Another Picture	1988	—	—	—
Bringing It Home	1992	—	—	—
Unconditional Love	1998	—	—	—
It's Christmas of Course	2007	—	—	29
Introducing Darlene Love	2015	134	3	2

=== Compilations ===
Title	Year
The Best of Darlene Love	1992
So Much Love: A Darlene Love Anthology 1958–1998	2008
The Sound of Love: The Very Best of Darlene Love	2011
The Many Sides of Love: The Complete Reprise Recordings Plus!	2022

=== Live albums ===
Title	Year
Whole Hearted	1983
Darlene Love Live	1985
The Concert of Love	2010

=== Other appearances ===
- 1963: Today's Hits (Philles Records 4004)
- 1963: A Christmas Gift for You from Phil Spector (Philles Records 4005)
- 1977: Phil Spector's Greatest Hits (Warner-Spector Records 9104)
- 1978: Lakeshore Music presents Rock and Roll Forever (Warner Special Products #2508) (same as above release)
- 1985: Leader of the Pack Original Broadway Cast (Elektra Records 60420)
- 1990: Dick Tracy: Music from and inspired by the film (Sire/Warner Bros. Records 26236)
- 1991: Back to Mono (1958–1969) (ABKCO Records 7118) (boxed set)
- 1992: A Very Special Christmas 2 (A&M/PolyGram Records 450 003)
- 1998: Grease Is the Word (Rhino/Atlantic Records)

=== Singles ===
Incomplete list of recordings.

Year	Title	Chart positions			
Year	Title	US Hot 100	US R&B	CAN	UK
1961	"Son-In-Law" (The Blossoms) Challenge 9109 (lead vocals by unknown session vocalist)	79	—	—	—
1961	"Hard to Get" (The Blossoms) Challenge 9122	—	—	—	—
1962	"The Search Is Over" (The Blossoms) Challenge 9138	—	—	—	—
1962	"He's a Rebel" (released as the Crystals) Philles 106	1	2	1	19
1962	"Zip-a-Dee-Doo-Dah" (released as Bob B. Soxx & the Blue Jeans) Philles 107 (lead vocals by Bobby Sheen)	8	7	—	45
1962	"He's Sure the Boy I Love" (released as the Crystals) Philles 109	11	18	17	—
	"Dance with the Guitar Man" (released as Duane Eddy & the Rebelettes)	12		2	4
	"Boss Guitar" (released as Duane Eddy & The Rebelettes)	28		5	27
1963	"Why Do Lovers Break Each Others Hearts" (released as Bob B. Soxx & the Blue Jeans) Philles 110	38	—	—	—
1963	"Today I Met the Boy I'm Gonna Marry" / "My Heart Beat a Little Bit Faster" Philles 111	39	—	—	—
1963	"Not Too Young to Get Married" (released as Bob B. Soxx & the Blue Jeans) Philles 113 (joint lead vocals with Bobby Sheen)	63	—	—	—
1963	"Wait 'til My Bobby Gets Home" / "Take It from Me" Philles 114	26	—	—	—
1963	"A Fine, Fine Boy" Philles 117	53	29	—	—
1963	"Christmas (Baby Please Come Home)" Philles 119	14	—	36	20
	"Mexican Drummer Man" (as Herb Alpert & the Tijuana Brass)	77			
1964	"Stumble and Fall" / "He's a Quiet Guy" Philles 123	—	—	—	—
1964	"Christmas (Baby Please Come Home)" Philles 125	—	—	—	—
1964	"3625 Groovy Street" / "What Are We Gonna Do in '64" (The Wildcats) Reprise 0253 (The Blossoms under a pseudonym; features unison lead vocals)	—	—	—	—
1965	"Good Good Lovin'" / "That's When the Tears Start" (The Blossoms) Reprise 0436	—	45	—	—
1966	"Lover Boy" / "My Love Come Home" (The Blossoms) Reprise 0475	—	—	—	—
1966	"Let Your Love Shine on Me" / "Deep Into My Heart" (The Blossoms) Reprise 0522	—	—	—	—
1966	"Too Late to Say You're Sorry" / "If" Reprise 0534	—	—	—	—
1967	"Deep Into My Heart" / "Good Good Lovin'" (The Blossoms) Reprise 0639	—	—	—	—
1967	"Wonderful" b/w "Stoney End" (The Blossoms) Ode 101 (B-side features joint lead vocals with Jean King)	—	—	—	—
1968	"Tweedlee Dee" (The Blossoms) MGM 13964	—	—	—	—
1968	"Cry Like a Baby" (The Blossoms) Ode 106	—	—	—	—
1969	"Stoney End" b/w "Wonderful" – reissued (The Blossoms) Ode 125 (A-side features joint lead vocals with Jean King)	—	—	—	—
1969	"You've Lost That Lovin' Feelin'" / "Something So Wrong" (The Blossoms) Bell 780	—	—	—	—
1969	"(You're My) Soul and Inspiration" / "Stand By" (The Blossoms) Bell 797	—	—	—	—
1970	"I Ain't Got to Love Nobody Else" / "Don't Take Your Love" (The Blossoms) Bell 857	—	—	—	—
1970	"One Step Away" / "Break Your Promise" (The Blossoms) Bell 937	—	—	—	—
1972	"Touchdown" (The Blossoms) Lion 108	—	—	—	—
1972	"Grandma's Hands" (The Blossoms) Lion 125	—	—	—	—
1974	"Christmas (Baby Please Come Home)" / "Winter Wonderland" Warner-Spector Records 0401	14 / 40	—	—	—
1975	"Lord, If You're a Woman" / "Stumble and Fall" Warner-Spector Records 0410	—	—	—	—
1977	"There's No Greater Love" (The Blossoms) Epic 50435	—	—	—	—
1988	"He's Sure the Man I Love" / "I've Never Been the Same" / "Everybody Needs" Columbia 07984	—	—	—	—
1992	"All Alone on Christmas" (used in the film Home Alone 2: Lost in New York) Fox 10003	83	—	—	31
2005	"Christmastime for the Jews" (from Saturday Night Live)	—	—	—	—

== Filmography ==
Year	Film	Role	Notes
1969	Change of Habit	Backup Singer	Uncredited
1969	The Love God?	Singer with the Blossoms	Uncredited
1987	Lethal Weapon	Trish Murtaugh	
1989	Lethal Weapon 2	Trish Murtaugh	
1992	Lethal Weapon 3	Trish Murtaugh	
1993	Another World	Judy Burrell	July 20, 1993 - September 21, 1993
1998	Lethal Weapon 4	Trish Murtaugh	
2013	20 Feet from Stardom	Herself	Documentary
2016	New Girl	Herself	
2019	Holiday Rush	Aunt Jo Robinson	
2020	The Christmas Chronicles 2	Grace	
2024	Stevie Van Zandt: Disciple	Herself	Documentary

== Theater ==
Year	Production	Role	Theatre
1985	Leader of the Pack	Herself	Ambassador Theatre, Broadway
1988	Carrie	Miss Gardner	Royal Shakespeare Theatre (tryout)
1988	Carrie	Miss Gardner	Virginia Theatre, Broadway
1997	Grease	Teen Angel	Eugene O'Neill Theatre, Broadway
2005-08	Hairspray	Motormouth Maybelle	Neil Simon Theatre, Broadway

== Notes ==
a. Some sources say 1938; see talk page discussion.
