= Roar (musician) =

Solo musical project by Owen Evans

- Origin: Phoenix, Arizona
- Genre: Indie rock
- Years active: 2010–present
- Label: Really (former)
- Members: Owen Richard Evans

Roar (stylized as ROAR) is an American solo musical project of Arizona-based musician Owen Richard Evans. He started the project in 2010 by releasing the extended play I Can't Handle Change. Evans has since released two more extended plays and four studio albums under the moniker.

== History ==
Evans was previously a member of the band Asleep in the Sea alongside Tom Filardo and Eli Kuner. Asleep in the Sea debuted in 2004 and opened for The Spinto Band in 2005, but disbanded three years later in 2007. Evans returned to the music scene in 2010, creating Roar and releasing the project's debut extended play, I Can't Handle Change. The EP was a response to Asleep in the Sea's disbandment. Roar's second extended play, Daytrotter Session, was released on February 26, 2011.

Roar's third extended play, I'm Not Here to Make Friends, was released on February 28, 2012, and was the project's only release under Really Records.

Roar's debut studio album, Impossible Animals, was released independently on March 27, 2016. During 2016, Evans joined band Andrew Jackson Jihad, which later rebranded to AJJ, as their drummer. Roar's second studio album, Pathétique Aesthétique, was released on July 5, 2018.

In 2019 and 2024, the titular song from I Can't Handle Change gained popularity on the internet, especially media-sharing app TikTok. On March 30, 2021, Roar's third studio album, Diamond Destroyer of Death, was released. Evans left AJJ during 2021.

In 2023, "Christmas Kids", a song from I Can't Handle Change, went viral on TikTok. The song's popularity led it to chart on the Irish Singles Chart and UK Singles Chart at 45 and 58, respectively; the entries marked Roar's first appearance on any international music charts. The song describes the abusive relationship between Phil Spector and his wife Ronnie.

== Discography ==
=== Studio albums ===
Title	Album details
Impossible Animals	Released: March 27, 2016; Label: Self-released; Format: LP, digital download, streaming
Pathétique Aesthétique	Released: July 5, 2018; Label: Self-released; Format: LP, digital download, streaming
Diamond Destroyer of Death	Released: March 30, 2021; Label: Self-released; Format: LP, digital download, streaming
Knives For Aries	Released: May 2, 2024; Label: Felt Forest Records; Format: LP, digital download, streaming

=== Compilation albums ===
Title	Album details
Demos and Voice Memos	Released: January 12, 2019; Label: Self-released; Format: Digital download, streaming

=== Live albums ===
Title	Album details
Live in the Secret Garden	Released: May 8, 2018; Label: Self-released; Format: Digital download, streaming

=== Extended plays ===
Title	EP details
I Can't Handle Change	Released: March 14, 2010; Label: Self-released; Format: Digital download, streaming
Daytrotter Session	Released: February 26, 2011; Label: Self-released; Format: Digital download, streaming
I'm Not Here to Make Friends	Released: February 28, 2012; Label: Really; Format: Digital download, streaming
Recorded at a Record Store 2 (with Andrew Jackson Jihad)	Released: April 15, 2015; Label: SideOne Dummy; Format: Digital download, streaming

=== Charted and certified songs ===
Title	Year	Peak chart positions		Certifications	Album
Title	Year	IRE	UK	Certifications	Album
"I Can't Handle Change"	2010	—	—	RIAA: Platinum; BPI: Gold	I Can't Handle Change
"Christmas Kids"	2010	45	58	RIAA: Gold	I Can't Handle Change
