= Introducing Darlene Love =

Studio album by Darlene Love
- Released: September 2015
- Studios: Renegade Studios, New York City; Star Trax Studio
- Length: 62:29
- Label: Columbia
- Producer: Steven Van Zandt

Darlene Love chronology
It's Christmas of Course (2007)	Introducing Darlene Love (2015)

Introducing Darlene Love is the fifth studio album by American singer Darlene Love, released in September 2015 on Columbia Records. The album peaked at No. 12 on the US Billboard Top R&B/Hip-Hop Albums chart in October 2015.

== Critical reception ==
Professional ratings
Review scores
Source	Rating
AllMusic	3.5/5 stars
The Guardian	3/5 stars
Rolling Stone	3.5/5 stars

Maddy Costa of The Guardian wrote "Darlene Love is one of the 1960s girl-group footsoldiers who has consistently marched at the periphery of the spotlight, except when friends in high places – including David Letterman – thrust her into full view. The E Street Band's Steven Van Zandt is a long-time champion, and the 65-minute album he has constructed around her, featuring new songs by Bruce Springsteen and Elvis Costello, has the gushing quality of a fan tribute." Mark Deming of AllMusic found Introducing "a convincer, proving Darlene Love still holds the title of one of rock and R&B's greatest vocalists."

== Track listing ==
No.	Title	Writer(s)	Length
1.	"Among the Believers"	Steven Van Zandt	3:28
2.	"Forbidden Nights"	Elvis Costello	3:46
3.	"Love Kept Us Foolin' Around"	Linda Perry	3:39
4.	"Little Liar"	Desmond Child, Joan Jett	3:55
5.	"Still Too Soon to Know" (featuring Bill Medley)	Elvis Costello	3:36
6.	"Who Under Heaven"	Jimmy Webb	6:37
7.	"Night Closing In"	Bruce Springsteen	4:20
8.	"Painkiller"	Michael Des Barres, Paul Ill	4:23
9.	"Just Another Lonely Mile"	Bruce Springsteen	4:25
10.	"Last Time"	Steven Van Zandt	4:38
11.	"River Deep, Mountain High"	Ellie Greenwich, Jeff Barry, Phil Spector	4:34
12.	"Sweet Freedom"	Barry Mann, Cynthia Weil	3:15
13.	"Marvelous"	Walter Hawkins	5:41
14.	"Jesus Is the Rock (That Keeps Me Rollin')"	Steven Van Zandt	6:18

== Charts ==
Chart (2015)	Peak position
US Billboard 200	134
US Top R&B/Hip-Hop Albums (Billboard)	12
