= I Can't Handle Change =

EP by Roar
- Released: March 14, 2010
- Genres: Indie pop; pop rock; bedroom pop
- Length: 14:53
- Label: Self-released
- Producer: Owen Evans

Roar chronology
I Can't Handle Change (2010)	I'm Not Here to Make Friends (2012)

Singles from I Can't Handle Change
- 1. "I Can't Handle Change" Released: March 14, 2010; 2. "Christmas Kids" Released: March 14, 2010

I Can't Handle Change is an EP by the American indie pop band Roar. Released in 2010, the EP features lo-fi indie pop and bedroom pop. Both the title track and the song "Christmas Kids" went viral on TikTok and in 2023 "Christmas Kids" reached number 45 on the Irish Singles Chart.

The EP describes the abusive relationship between Phil Spector and Ronnie Spector, the lead singer of the Ronettes. Most of the songs are written in first person.

Songs such as "I Can't Handle Change" are written from the perspectives of both Phil and Ronnie Spector, and "Christmas Kids" is written from Phil's perspective.

== Critical reception ==
Sputnikmusic described the album as "sweet little album that will have you humming to its melancholic lyrics for a long time".

== Track listing ==
All tracks are written by Owen Evans.

I Can't Handle Change track listing
No.	Title	Length
1.	"I Can't Handle Change"	3:18
2.	"Duck or Ape"	1:38
3.	"Heart for Brains"	2:49
4.	"Baby Bride Rag"	0:55
5.	"Christmas Kids"	2:15
6.	"Just a Fan"	3:55
Total length:		14:53

== Personnel ==
Credits adapted from liner notes.

- Owen Evans – songwriting, composition, production, vocals, guitar
- Nick Krill – mixing, recording
- Mike Hissong – recording
- Preston Bryant – recording
- Robin Vining – additional instruments and vocals
- Dave Gironda – trumpet
