= Why Do Lovers Break Each Other's Heart =

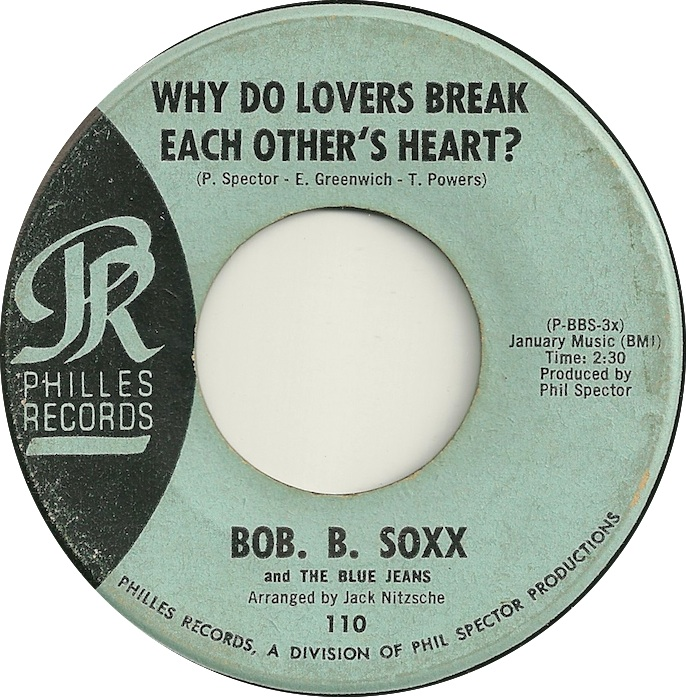
- Side A label of the US single

Single by Bob B. Soxx and the Blue Jeans

from the album Zip-a-Dee-Doo-Dah
- B-side: "Dr. Kaplan's Office"
- Released: 1962
- Studio: Gold Star, Los Angeles
- Genre: Pop
- Length: 2:30
- Label: Philles
- Songwriters: Phil Spector, Ellie Greenwich, Tony Powers
- Producer: Phil Spector

Bob B. Soxx and the Blue Jeans singles chronology
"Zip-a-Dee-Doo-Dah" (1962)	"Why Do Lovers Break Each Other's Heart" (1962)	"Not Too Young to Get Married" (1963)

Music video
- "Why Do Lovers Break Each Other's Heart" on YouTube

"Why Do Lovers Break Each Other's Heart", sometimes shown as "Why Do Lovers Break Each Others Hearts" or "Why Do Lovers (Break Each Other's Heart)", is a pop song written by Phil Spector, Ellie Greenwich and Tony Powers. It was written as a tribute to Frankie Lymon and the Teenagers, and was first recorded by Bob B. Soxx and the Blue Jeans. Their version featured lead vocals by Darlene Love, and reached No. 38 on the Billboard Hot 100 in early 1963.

== Showaddywaddy version ==
In the UK, the only hit version was by Showaddywaddy, whose recording reached No. 22 on the UK singles chart in 1980.

=== Charts ===
Chart (1980)	Peak position
Australia (Kent Music Report)	83
United Kingdom (Official Charts Company)	22
