= Not Too Young to Get Married =

Single by Bob B. Soxx and the Blue Jeans
- B-side: "Annette"
- Released: 1963
- Studio: Gold Star, Los Angeles
- Genre: Pop
- Length: 2:20
- Label: Philles
- Songwriter(s): Phil Spector, Ellie Greenwich, Jeff Barry
- Producer(s): Phil Spector

Bob B. Soxx and the Blue Jeans singles chronology
"Why Do Lovers Break Each Other's Heart" (1962)	"Not Too Young to Get Married" (1963)

"Not Too Young to Get Married" is a song written by Phil Spector, Ellie Greenwich, and Jeff Barry. It was recorded at the Gold Star Studios in Los Angeles in April 1963, by Bob B. Soxx and the Blue Jeans. The lead vocalists were Bobby Sheen and Darlene Love. The song was arranged by Jack Nitzsche, while Larry Levine was the engineer and Spector's Wall of Sound was played by the Wrecking Crew.

The record was released later in 1963 on Philles Records and peaked at No. 63 on the Billboard Hot 100.

== Chart performance ==
Chart (1963)	Peak position
US Billboard Hot 100	63

== Cover versions ==
The song's writers, Greenwich and Barry released a version of the song by their group the Raindrops, also in 1963, while Darlene Love released a 1985 version as Darlene Love and Girls. British pop band Racey included the song on their 1996 album Lay Your Love on Me after issuing it as a single in 1982.
