= Zip-a-Dee-Doo-Dah =

1946 song composed by Allie Wrubel

Song by James Baskett
- Recorded: 1946
- Genre: Jazz; scat
- Length: 2:19
- Composer: Allie Wrubel
- Lyricist: Ray Gilbert

"Zip-a-Dee-Doo-Dah" is a song composed by Allie Wrubel with lyrics by Ray Gilbert for Disney's 1946 live action and animated movie Song of the South, sung by James Baskett. "Zip-a-Dee-Doo-Dah" won the Academy Award for Best Original Song and was the second Disney song to win this award, after "When You Wish upon a Star" from Pinocchio (1940). In 2004, it finished at number 47 in AFI's 100 Years...100 Songs, a survey of top tunes in American cinema.

According to Disney historian Jim Korkis, the word "Zip-a-Dee-Doo-Dah" was reportedly invented by Walt Disney, who was fond of nonsense words used in songs such as "Bibbidi-Bobbidi-Boo" from Cinderella (1950) and "Supercalifragilisticexpialidocious" from Mary Poppins (1964). Ken Emerson, author of the 1997 book Doo-dah!: Stephen Foster And The Rise Of American Popular Culture, believes that the song is influenced by the chorus of the pre-Civil War folk song "Zip Coon", a "Turkey in the Straw" variation: "O Zip a duden duden duden zip a duden day".

Since 2020, Disney has disassociated itself from the song due to the longstanding controversy over racial connotations associated with Song of the South, with the song being removed from soundtracks in the company's theme parks and associated resorts in the United States.

== Notable versions ==
The Walt Disney Company never released a single from the soundtrack of Song of the South.

- Johnny Mercer & the Pied Pipers had a No. 8 hit with their rendition of the song in December 1946. The flip side of the record was "Everybody Has a Laughing Place", from the same movie and by the same composers. As a result, Mercer had to correct listeners who mistakenly assumed that he wrote it.
- The Modernaires with Paula Kelly – this reached the No. 11 spot in the Billboard charts in 1946.
- Sammy Kaye & His Orchestra – this also reached the No. 11 spot in the Billboard charts in 1946.
- It is the first track on the inaugural The Jackson 5 album, Diana Ross Presents The Jackson 5.
- A disco-style of the song was featured in the Mickey Mouse Disco album.
- The Disneymania series of compilation albums included several versions of the song, among them a cover by Stevie Brock for Disneymania 2, a cover by Aly & AJ for Disneymania 3, and a cover by Miley Cyrus for Disneymania 4.

=== Bob B. Soxx & the Blue Jeans version ===
"Zip-a-Dee Doo-Dah"

Single by Bob B. Soxx and the Blue Jeans

from the album Zip-a-Dee-Doo-Dah
- B-side: "Flip and Nitty"
- Released: 1962
- Studio: Gold Star, Los Angeles
- Genre: Pop
- Length: 2:40
- Label: Philles
- Songwriters: Allie Wrubel, Ray Gilbert
- Producer: Phil Spector

Bob B. Soxx and the Blue Jeans singles chronology
"Zip-a-Dee Doo-Dah" (1962)	"Why Do Lovers Break Each Other's Heart" (1962)

Bypassing his usual publishing sources, producer Phil Spector reconfigured "Zip-A-Dee-Doo-Dah" in a style akin to Bo Diddley. According to former girlfriend Annette Merar, the song had come to Spector spontaneously while he was playing guitar; he immediately resolved to record it. He produced the recording for Bob B. Soxx & the Blue Jeans with the Wrecking Crew in late 1962. Yielding puzzled reactions from those present at the session, saxophonist Steve Douglas later recalled that Spector's request for two bass players had been "ridiculous", while engineer Larry Levine, accustomed to conventionally smaller rock set-ups, was similarly perplexed by the number of musicians gathered.

To obtain the guitar tone heard on the recording, Billy Strange suggested removing one of the power tubes from his Fender Twin Reverb amplifier, an effect Spector approved. The resulting distortion produced a "fuzzy" coloration of his guitar tone, later identified by Howard as "arguably, rock's first intentionally fuzz-toned guitar solo."

Strange's guitar solo, performed during the bridge, was captured through bleed from his amplifier into the room microphones rather than a direct microphone. As the session progressed, Spector had repeatedly instructed Levine to increase the recording levels, resulting in the audio meters remaining in the red zone. This prompted Levine, concerned about the distortion risk, to turn off all the microphones to reset the levels. Levine then rebuilt the mix, but before activating Strange's microphone, Spector halted the process, declaring that the sound was acceptable and directed Levine to record as-is.

Levine later considered the recording the first true example of Spector's Wall of Sound production style. According to the Beatles' George Harrison: "Some years later everyone started to try to copy that sound and so they invented the fuzz box."

In 1963, Bob B. Soxx & the Blue Jeans took their version of the song to number 8 on the Billboard Hot 100 chart and number 7 on the Hot R&B Singles chart. Their song also peaked at number 45 in the UK Singles Chart the same year. The song was included on the only album the group ever recorded, Zip-a-Dee-Doo-Dah, issued on the Philles Records label.

==== Personnel ====
This version was sung by the following people:

- Bobby Sheen – lead vocals
- Darlene Love – background vocals (and ad-libs)
- Fanita James – background vocals
