= Warner-Spector Records =

Defunct record label

Warner-Spector Records was a record label formed on October 12, 1974 as an outlet for Phil Spector productions by Warner Bros. Records. The label lasted for three years. Except for a new single by Cher, "A Woman's Story", and a Dion album, Born to Be with You, which was released only in the United Kingdom, all the releases on Warner-Spector were reissues of product from Philles Records, the label Phil Spector had co-founded in 1962.

== See also ==
- List of record labels
