= Bobby Sheen =

Musical artist (1941-2000)

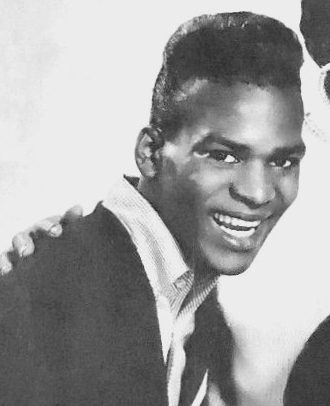
- Sheen in 1962

Background information
- Also known as: Bob B. Soxx
- Born: Robert Joseph Sheen; May 17, 1941; St. Louis, Missouri, U.S.
- Died: November 23, 2000 (aged 59) Los Angeles, California, U.S.
- Genre: Rhythm and blues
- Occupation: Singer
- Instrument: Vocals

Robert Joseph Sheen (May 17, 1941 – November 23, 2000) was an American rhythm and blues singer.

== Biography ==
Born in St. Louis, Missouri, Sheen is best known for singing with Bob B. Soxx & the Blue Jeans who had their biggest hit "Zip-a-Dee-Doo-Dah" in 1962 (which was produced by Phil Spector). The New York Times referred to "Zip-a-Dee-Doo-Dah" as one of Spector's "more idiosyncratic hits."

Sheen also recorded with other groups including the Robins, the Lovables, the Ding Dongs, and the Alley Cats. He would later join Bobby Nunn's group of the Coasters and recorded an album with the group, Coasting, in 1979, which was released on Sheen's own record label, Salsa Picante Records. When Bobby Nunn died in 1986, Nunn's group of the Coasters still toured with Sheen and Billy Richards, Jr. as members.

Sheen died of pneumonia in Los Angeles, California at the age of 59. He was survived by his mother, two sons, and a daughter.

== Discography ==
=== Solo singles ===
- "How Many Nights" / "How Can We Ever Be Together" (Liberty #55459) (1962)
- "My Shoes Keep Walking Back To You" / "I Want You For My Sweetheart" (Dimension #1043) (1965)
- "Come On And Love Me" / "Love Stealing" (Chelsea #3034)
- "Dr. Love" / "Sweet Sweet Love" (Capitol #5672) (1966)
- "I Shook the World" / "Cloud Nine" (Capitol #5827) (1967)
- "The Way Of Love" / "Shelter Of Your Arms" (Capitol #5984) (1967)
- "I Don't Have To Dream" / "She Taught Me What Love Really Is" (Capitol #2507) (1969)
- "Something New To Do" / "I May Not Be What You Want" (Warner Brothers #7662) (1972)
- "If I Ever Dreamed I Hurt You" / "It Ain't Easy Being Your Fool" (Warner Brothers #7701) (1973)
- "Payback" / "Don't Make Me Do Wrong" (Warner Brothers #7732) (1973)

=== Various group singles and recordings ===
- "A Quarter To Twelve" / "Pretty Little Dolly" (Knight #2001) (1958) (The Robins)
- "A Little Bird Told Me" / "It's Never Too Late" (Knight #2008) (1959) (The Robins)
- "Talk, Talk, Talk" (Knight) (1959) (unreleased) (The Robins)
- "Sufferin'" (Knight) (1959) (unreleased) (The Robins)
- "Just Like That" / "Whole Lot Of Imagination" (Arvee #5001) (1959) (The Robins)
- "Live Wire Susie" / "Oh No" (Arvee #5013) (1960) (The Robins)
- "Ding Dong (Saw Wood Mountain)" / "Sweet Thing" (Eldo #109) (1960) (The Ding Dongs)
- "Lassie Come Home" / "Late Last Night" (Todd #1043) (1960) (The Ding Dongs)
- "The White Cliffs of Dover" / "How Many More Times" (Lavender #001) (1961) (The Robins)
- "Magic Of A Dream" / "Mary Lou Loves To Hootchy Kootchy Koo" (Lavender #002) (1961) (The Robins)
- "Short Skirt" / "Bread 'n Butter" (Eastman #9801) (1961) (The Lovables)
- "Zip-a-Dee-Doo-Dah" / "Flip And Nitty" (Philles #107) (1962) (Bob B. Soxx & the Blue Jeans)
- "Puddin 'n' Tain" / "Feels So Good" (Philles #108) (1963) (The Alley Cats)
- "Why Do Lovers Break Each Other’s Heart?" / "Dr. Kaplan's Office" (Philles #110) (1963) (Bob B. Soxx & the Blue Jeans)
- "Not Too Young To Get Married" / "Annette" (Philles #113) (1963) (Bob B. Soxx & the Blue Jeans)

=== Albums ===
- Bob B. Soxx & the Blue Jeans: Zip-A-Dee-Doo-Dah (Phillies #4002) (1963)
- Bob B. Soxx & the Blue Jeans: Spector Wall Of Sound Volume 2 (Super #2307-004) (1975)
- The Coasters: Coasting (Salsa Picante #10001) (1979)
- The Bobby Sheen Story (Wendi #517) (Australian release)
- The Bobby Sheen Anthology 1958-1975 (Ace #CDCHD-1257) (2010)
- Too Many To Fight (Soulscape #SSCD-7025) (2010)
