= Bob B. Soxx & the Blue Jeans =

American vocal group

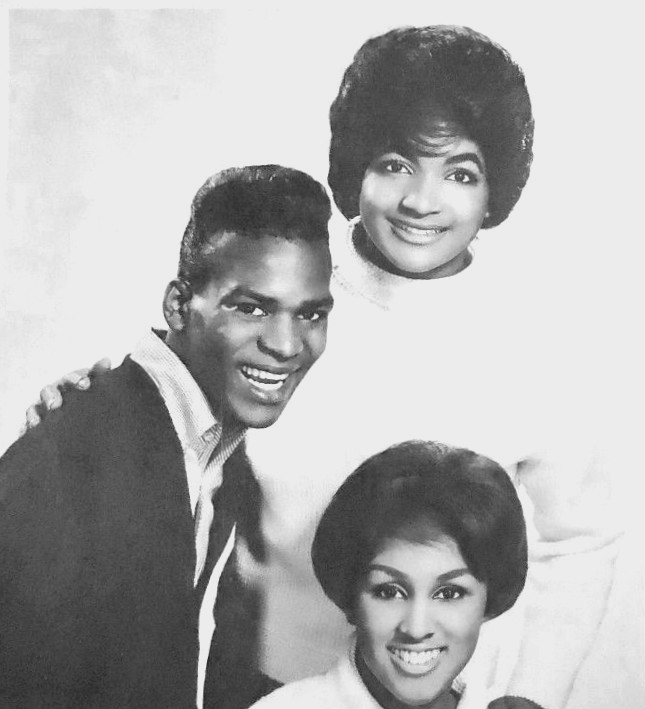
The group in 1962

Bob B. Soxx & the Blue Jeans was an early 1960s vocal group produced by Phil Spector, and was initially conceived as a vehicle for the lead vocals of Bobby Sheen, who took the stage name Bob B. Soxx. The Blue Jeans were backing vocalists Darlene Love and Fanita James, both of whom were also members of the girl group the Blossoms.

== Career ==
Despite Sheen's status as group leader, by the time the trio entered the recording studio, Spector was often using Love as the group's primary vocalist. Sheen sang lead on the group's first hit, 1962's "Zip-a-Dee-Doo-Dah" (originally from the 1946 Disney movie Song of the South). Love, meanwhile, handled the lead vocals on the follow-up single, 1963's "Why Do Lovers Break Each Other's Heart". Sheen and Love shared lead vocal duties on the final single, "Not Too Young to Get Married".

Sheen and Love shared vocal duties on the only album the group ever recorded, Zip-a-Dee-Doo-Dah (1963).

Sheen can be heard as lead vocalist on the group's final recordings, "The Bells of St. Mary's" and "Here Comes Santa Claus", two tracks on the Spector-produced album, A Christmas Gift for You from Phil Spector (1963), on which Love also appears as a solo artist. On the cover of this album, a group portrait shows Sheen with two Blue Jeans vocalists (actually two more Spector session singers, Lillian Washington and future Honey Cone member Carolyn Willis, who toured with Sheen as the Blue Jeans, although both Love and James continued as the Blue Jeans in the recording studio).

After 1963, the group was dropped by Philles Records and effectively ceased to exist. Sheen went back to using his real name, recorded some tracks for Capitol Records in the mid-1960s, and later joined a touring version of the Coasters, which featured original bass singer Bobby Nunn. Sheen had previously been a member of the Robins, joining in 1957. Love recorded a few solo hits, but, more memorably, was the lead vocalist on at least two hit records by the Crystals. It is also established that Sheen, Love, and James (with the rest of the Blossoms) were the voices on the Crystals' hits "He's a Rebel" and "He's Sure the Boy I Love".

== Discography ==
=== Albums ===
- Zip-a-Dee-Doo-Dah (1963)

=== Singles ===
| Year | Title | Peak chart positions | | Label | B-side | Album |
| Year | Title | US Pop | US R&B | Label | B-side | Album |
|---|---|---|---|---|---|---|
| 1962 | "Zip-a-Dee-Doo-Dah" | 8 | 7 | Philles | "Flip and Nitty" | Zip-a-Dee Doo Dah |
| 1963 | "Why Do Lovers Break Each Other's Heart?" | 38 | — | Philles | "Dr. Kaplan's Office" | Zip-a-Dee Doo Dah |
| 1963 | "Not Too Young to Get Married" | 63 | — | Philles | "Annette" | |
