= Phil Spector =

American record producer and murderer (1939–2021)

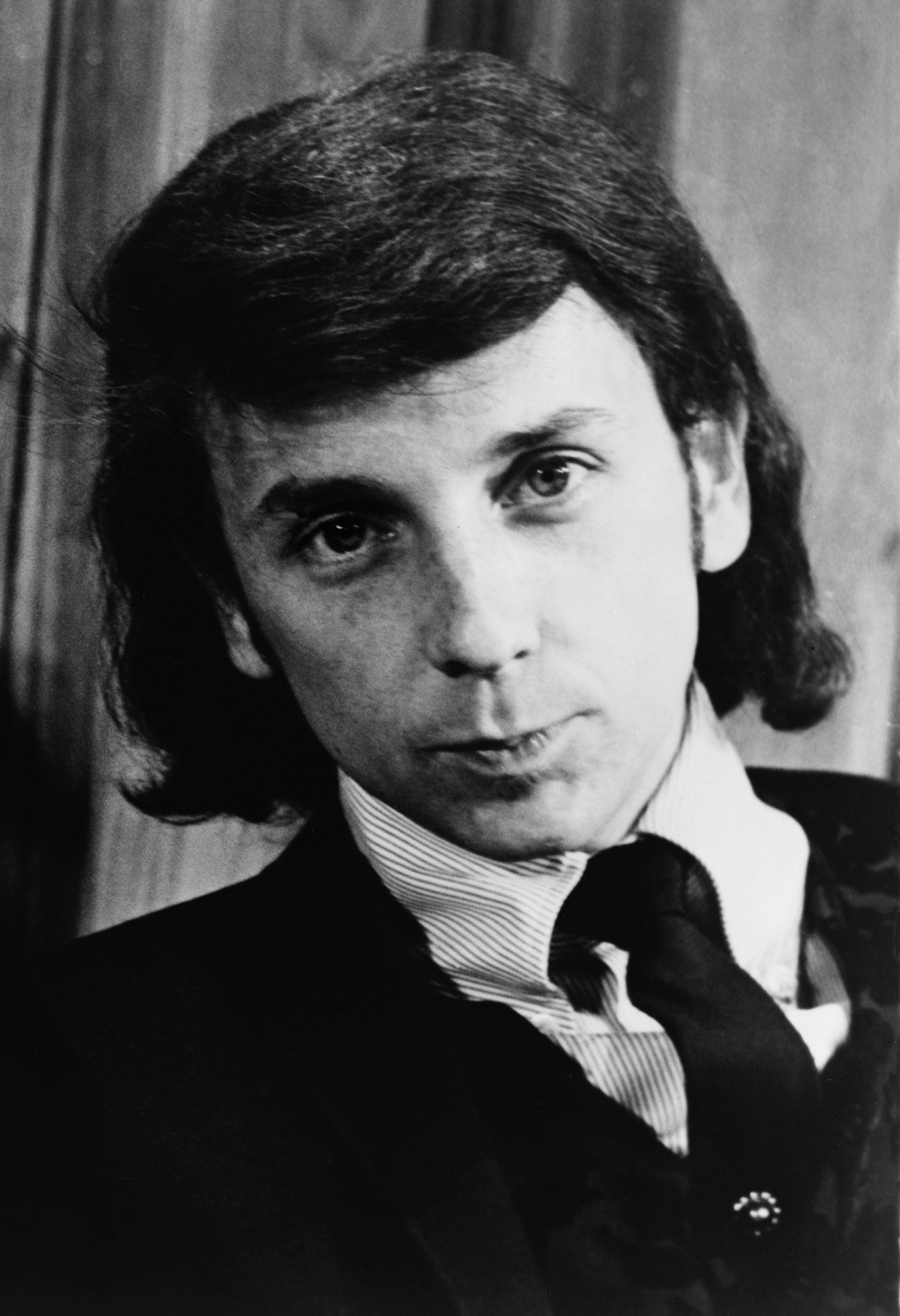
- Spector in 1965

Background information
- Also known as: Phil Harvey
- Born: Harvey Philip Spector; December 26, 1939; The Bronx, New York City, U.S.
- Origin: Los Angeles, California, U.S.
- Died: January 16, 2021 (aged 81) French Camp, California, U.S.
- Genres: Pop; rock and roll; R&B; soul
- Occupations: Record producer; songwriter; musician
- Instruments: Guitar; Piano; Vocals
- Works: Discography; Wall of Sound
- Years active: 1958–2003
- Labels: Era; Doré; Philles; Phi-Dan; Phil Spector International; Warner-Spector
- Formerly of: The Teddy Bears; The Spectors Three
- Spouse: Annette Merar (m. 1963; div. 1966) Ronnie Bennett (m. 1968; div. 1974) Rachelle Short (m. 2006; div. 2018)
- Children: 5
- Website: philspector.com
- Criminal information

Details
- Date: February 3, 2003
- Killed: 1 (Lana Clarkson)
- Weapon: .38 caliber Colt Cobra revolver

Harvey Phillip Spector (December 26, 1939 – January 16, 2021) was an American record producer and songwriter known primarily for his orchestral pop productions and recording technique, dubbed the "Wall of Sound", and decades later for his trials and imprisonment for murder. Considered the first music producer auteur, he is the most successful American producer of the 1960s and widely regarded as one of the most influential figures in pop music history.

Born in the Bronx, Spector relocated to Los Angeles as a teenager and co-founded the Teddy Bears in 1958, writing their chart-topping single "To Know Him Is to Love Him". With Lester Sill, he co-established Philles Records in 1961, becoming the youngest U.S. label owner at the time, and exerted unprecedented artistic control over his recordings, typically working in collaboration with a rotation of songwriting teams, arranger Jack Nitzsche, and engineer Larry Levine. His studio band, later known as the Wrecking Crew, rose to industry prominence through his success with acts like the Crystals, Darlene Love, the Ronettes, and the Righteous Brothers. His second marriage, lasting 1968 to 1974, was to Ronettes singer Veronica Bennett. In the 1970s, he produced the Beatles' Let It Be, solo recordings by John Lennon and George Harrison, and Dion DiMucci's Born to Be with You, Leonard Cohen's Death of a Ladies' Man, and the Ramones' End of the Century. By 1980, he had semi-retired from music.

Spector ultimately produced nineteen U.S. top-ten singles, including four additional number-ones (the Crystals' "He's a Rebel", the Righteous Brothers' "You've Lost That Lovin' Feelin'", the Beatles' "The Long and Winding Road", and Harrison's "My Sweet Lord"). He is credited with having a significant impact on rock music, the girl group sound, in-studio composition, and the professional function of record producers themselves. He contributed to the development of music genres and movements such as psychedelia, art rock/pop, noise pop, dream pop, and shoegaze. In 1989, he was inducted into the Rock and Roll Hall of Fame.

After the 1980s, Spector remained largely inactive amid periods of reclusion, substance abuse, and erratic behavior. In 2009, he was convicted of the 2003 murder of actress Lana Clarkson and sentenced to 19 years to life in prison, where he died in 2021.

== Background ==
Harvey Philip Spector was born on December 26, 1939. (Note: Some sources erroneously cite 1940 as his year of birth. He later added a second "l" to his middle name, which he preferred over "Harvey".) His mother, Bertha, was a first-generation immigrant in a Russian-Jewish family in the Bronx, New York City. She had been born in France to Russian migrants George and Clara Spektor, who brought her to the United States in 1911 aged 9 months. His father, Benjamin, was born as Baruch in the Russian Empire to George and Bessie Spektus or Spektres, and brought to the U.S. by his parents in 1913 aged 10. Both families anglicized their last names to "Spector" on their naturalization papers, which were witnessed by the same man, Isidore Spector. The similarities in name and background of the grandfathers led Spector to believe that his parents were first cousins. He had a sister named Shirley, who was six years his senior; she died in 2004 in Hemet, California, at the age of 70.

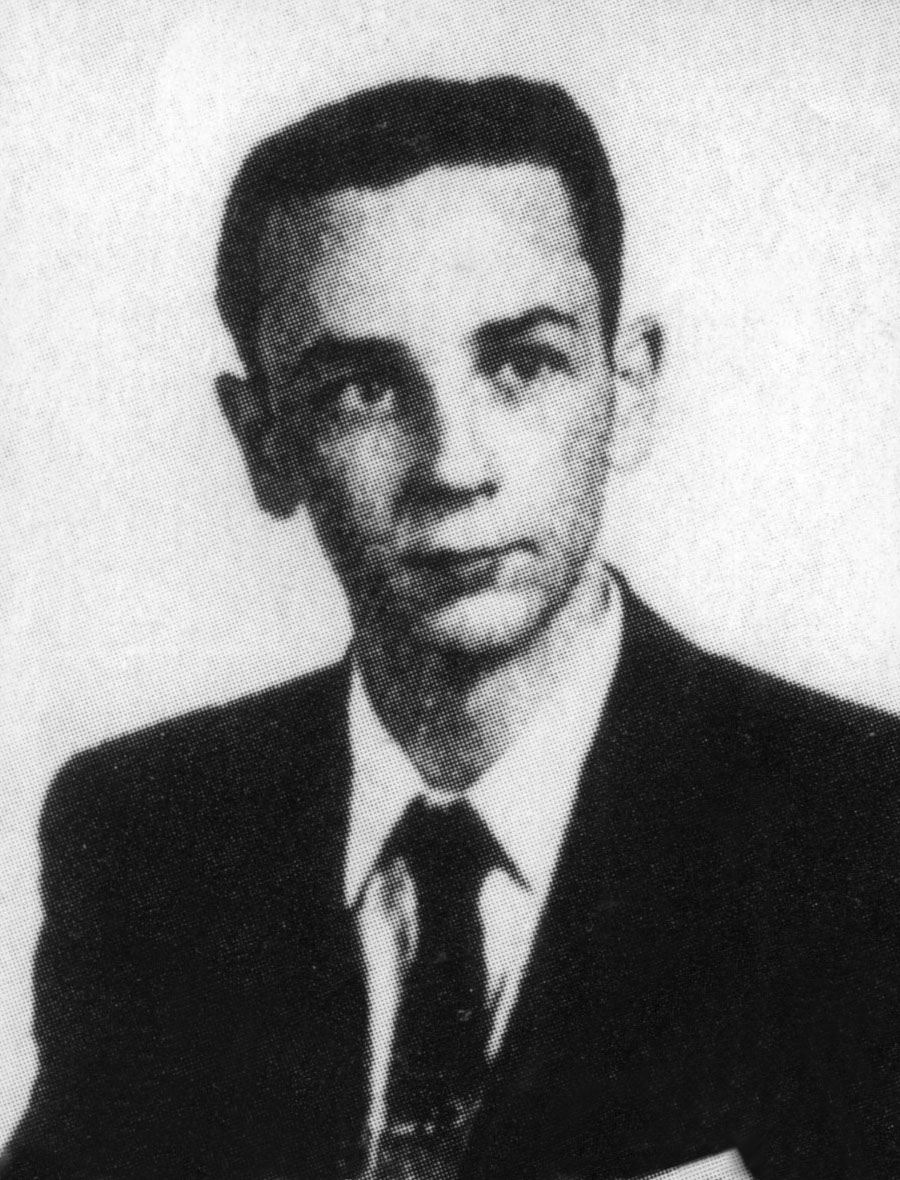
Spector's Fairfax High School yearbook photo 1957

In April 1949, Spector's father, who was deeply in debt, died by suicide; on his gravestone were inscribed the words "Ben Spector. Father. Husband. To Know Him Was To Love Him". In 1953, Spector's mother moved the family to Los Angeles where she found work as a seamstress. Spector attended John Burroughs Junior High School (now John Burroughs Middle School) on Wilshire Boulevard, then in 1955 attended Fairfax High School. Having learned to play guitar, Spector performed "Rock Island Line" in a talent show at Fairfax High. He joined a loose-knit community of aspiring musicians, including Lou Adler, Bruce Johnston, Steve Douglas, and Sandy Nelson. Spector formed a group, the Teddy Bears, with Nelson and three other friends, Marshall Leib, Harvey Goldstein and Annette Kleinbard.

== Career (1958–2009) ==
=== 1958–1961: The Teddy Bears and early production work ===
During this period, record producer Stan Ross—co-owner of Gold Star Studios in Hollywood—began to tutor Spector in record production and exerted a major influence on Spector's production style. In 1958, the Teddy Bears recorded the Spector-penned "Don't You Worry My Little Pet", and then signed a two to three singles recording deal with Era Records, with the promise of more if the singles did well.

At their next session, they recorded another song Spector had written—this one inspired by the epitaph on Spector's father's tombstone. Released on Era's subsidiary label, Doré Records, "To Know Him Is to Love Him" reached number one on Billboard Hot 100 singles chart on December 1, 1958, selling over a million copies by year's end. Following the success of their debut, the group signed with Imperial Records. Their next single, "I Don't Need You Anymore", reached number 91. They released several more recordings, including an album, The Teddy Bears Sing!, but failed to reach the top 100 in US sales. The group disbanded in 1959.

While recording the Teddy Bears' album, Spector met Lester Sill, a former promotion man who was a mentor to Jerry Leiber and Mike Stoller. Sill and his partner, Lee Hazlewood supported Spector's next project, the Spectors Three. In 1960, Sill arranged for Spector to work as an apprentice to Leiber and Stoller in New York. Spector co-wrote the Ben E. King Top 10 hit "Spanish Harlem" with Leiber and also worked as a session musician, playing the guitar solo on the Drifters' song "On Broadway".

Spector's first true recording artist and project as producer was Ronnie Crawford. Spector's production work during this time included releases by LaVern Baker, Ruth Brown, and Billy Storm, as well as the Top Notes' original recording of "Twist and Shout". Leiber and Stoller recommended Spector to produce Ray Peterson's "Corrine, Corrina", which reached number 9 in January 1961. Later, he produced another major hit for Curtis Lee, "Pretty Little Angel Eyes", which made it to number 7. Returning to Hollywood, Spector agreed to produce one of Sill's acts. After both Liberty Records and Capitol Records turned down the master of "Be My Boy" by the Paris Sisters, Sill formed a new label, Gregmark Records, with Lee Hazlewood, and released it. It reached only number 56, but the follow-up, "I Love How You Love Me", was a hit, reaching number 5.

=== 1961–1965: Philles Records ===
In late 1961, Spector formed a record company with Sill, who by this time had ended his business partnership with Hazlewood. Philles Records combined the first names of its two founders. Through Hill and Range Publishers, Spector found three groups he wanted to produce: the Ducanes, the Creations, and the Crystals. The first two signed with other companies, but Spector managed to secure the Crystals for his new label. Their first single, "There's No Other (Like My Baby)" was a success, hitting number 20. Their next release, "Uptown", made it to number 13.

Spector continued to work freelance with other artists. In 1962, he produced "Second Hand Love" by Connie Francis, which reached number 7. Ahmet Ertegun of Atlantic paired Spector with future Broadway star Jean DuShon for "Talk to Me", the B-side of which was "Tired of Trying", written by DuShon.

In 1962, Spector briefly took a job as an A&R producer for Liberty Records. It was while working at Liberty that he heard a song written by Gene Pitney, for whom he had produced a number 41 hit, "Every Breath I Take", a year earlier. "He's a Rebel" was due to be released on Liberty by Vikki Carr, but Spector rushed into Gold Star Studios and recorded a cover version using Darlene Love and the Blossoms on lead vocals. The record was released on Philles, attributed to the Crystals, and quickly rose to the top of the charts.

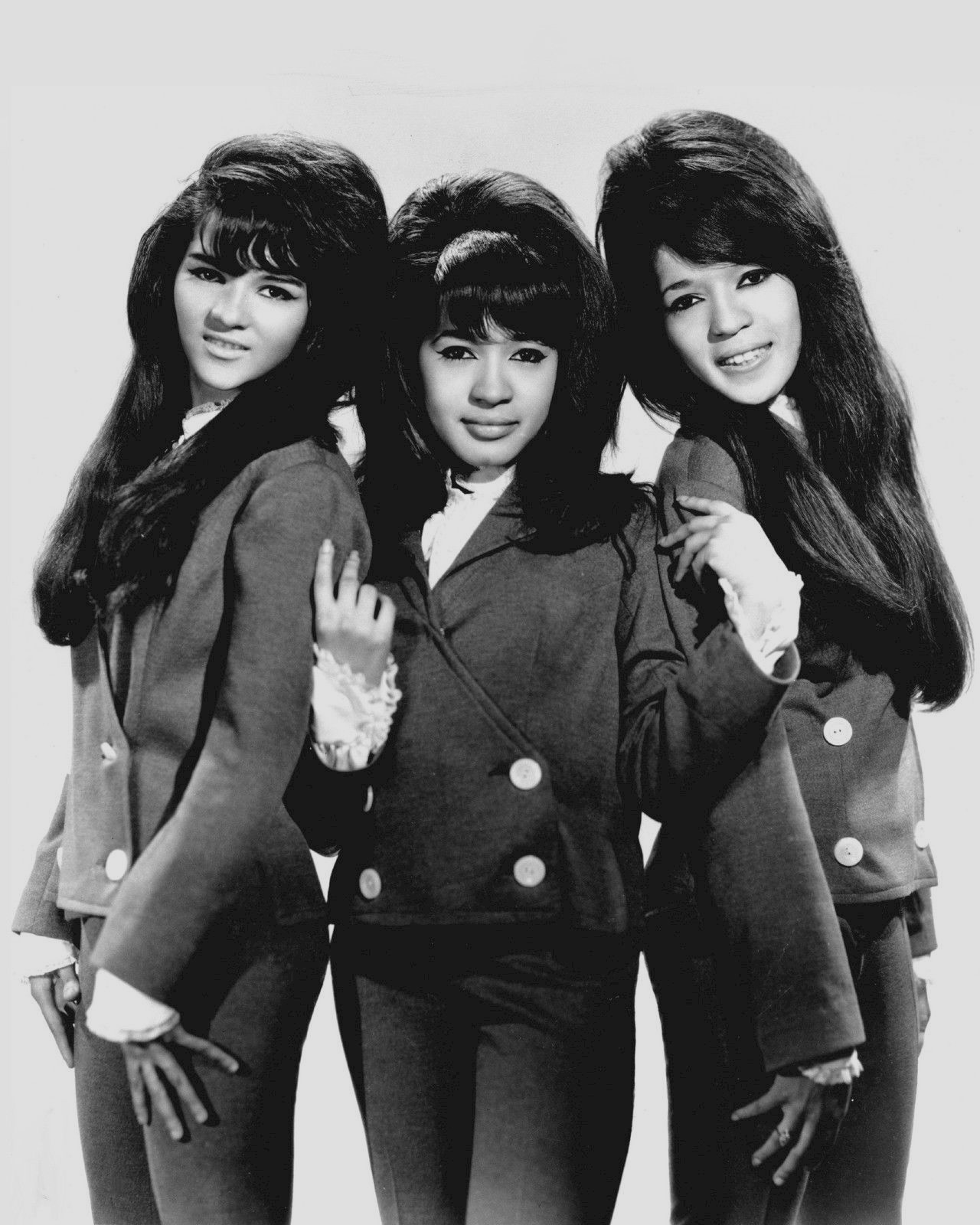
The Ronettes, 1966. Spector married frontwoman Veronica Bennett (known as Ronnie, center) in 1968.

By the time "He's a Rebel" went to number 1, Lester Sill was out of the company, and Spector had Philles all to himself. He created a new act, Bob B. Soxx & the Blue Jeans, featuring Darlene Love, Fanita James (a member of the Blossoms), and Bobby Sheen, a singer he had worked with at Liberty. The group had hits with "Zip-a-Dee-Doo-Dah" (number 8), "Why Do Lovers Break Each Other's Heart" (number 38), and "Not Too Young to Get Married" (number 63). Spector also released solo material by Darlene Love in 1963. In the same year, he released "Be My Baby" by the Ronettes, which went to number 2.

Beginning with "Zip-A-Dee-Doo-Dah", Spector paired his singles with intentionally inconsequential B-sides, which were typically instrumental tracks improvised at the close of a session, to ensure radio programmers played his preferred A-side. Spector named the B-sides after various associates, including his psychiatrist ("Dr. Kaplan's Office") and the operator of a hamburger stand located outside of Gold Star ("Brother Julius"). In some cases, he delegated responsibility for these recordings to keyboardist Don Randi, who stated that Spector ultimately claimed sole credit for many of them.

The first time Spector put the same amount of effort into an LP as he did into 45s was when he utilized the full Philles roster and the Wrecking Crew to make what he felt would become a hit for the 1963 Christmas season. A Christmas Gift for You from Philles Records was released a few days after the assassination of President Kennedy in November 1963.

On September 28, 1963, the Ronettes appeared at the Cow Palace, near San Francisco. Also on the bill were the Righteous Brothers. Spector, who was conducting the band for all the acts, was so impressed with Bill Medley and Bobby Hatfield that he bought their contract from Moonglow Records and signed them to Philles. In early 1965, "You've Lost That Lovin' Feelin'" became the label's second number 1 single. Three more major hits with the duo followed: "Just Once in My Life" (number 9), "Unchained Melody" (number 4, originally the B-side of "Hung on You"), and "Ebb Tide" (number 5). Despite having hits, he lost interest in producing the Righteous Brothers and sold their contract and all their master recordings to Verve Records. However, the sound of the Righteous Brothers' singles was so distinctive that the act chose to replicate it after leaving Spector, notching a second number 1 hit in 1966 with the Bill Medley–produced "(You're My) Soul and Inspiration".

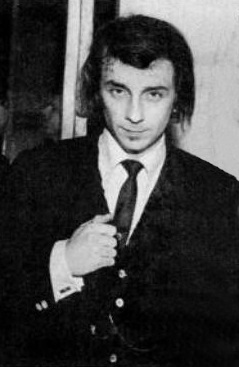
Spector, 1965

In 1963, Spector established the short-lived Phi-Dan subsidiary label, intended to feature productions by associates such as Vini Poncia, Peter Andreoli, keyboardist Leon Russell, among others. The imprint released eight singles before dissolving, including singles by artists including Betty Willis, the Lovelites, and the Ikettes. None of the recordings on Phi-Dan were produced by Spector.

The recording of "Unchained Melody", credited on some releases as a Spector production although Medley has consistently said he produced it originally as an album track, had a second wave of popularity 25 years after its initial release, when it was featured prominently in the 1990 hit movie Ghost. A re-release of the single re-charted on the Billboard Hot 100, and went to number one on the Adult Contemporary charts. This also put Spector back on the U.S. Top 40 charts for the first time since his last appearance in 1971 with John Lennon's "Imagine", though he did have UK top 40 hits in the interim with the Ramones.

=== 1966–1969: Ike & Tina Turner and hiatus ===
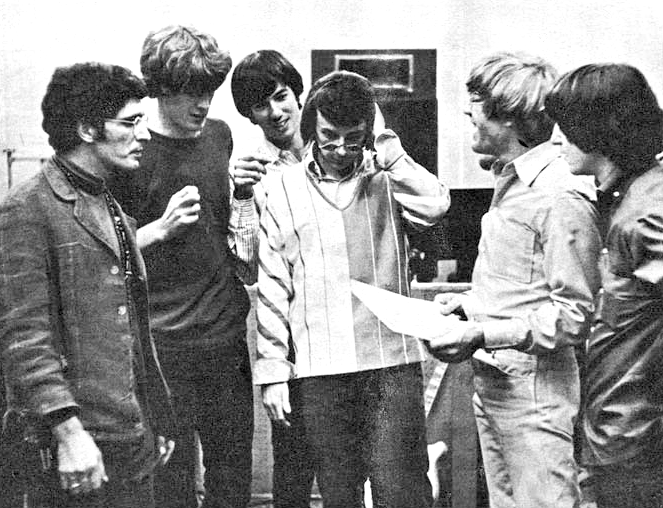
Spector with Modern Folk Quartet, for whom he produced "This Could Be the Night" in 1966

Spector's final signing to Philles was the husband-and-wife team of Ike & Tina Turner in April 1966. Spector considered their single "River Deep – Mountain High" his best work, but it failed to reach any higher than number 88 in the United States. The record, which actually featured Tina Turner without Ike Turner, was successful in Britain, reaching number 3.

Spector released another single by Ike & Tina Turner, "I'll Never Need More Than This", while negotiating a deal to move Philles to A&M Records in 1967. The deal did not materialize, and Spector subsequently lost enthusiasm for his label and the recording industry. Already something of a recluse, he withdrew temporarily from the public eye, marrying Veronica "Ronnie" Bennett, lead singer of the Ronettes, in 1968. Spector emerged briefly for a cameo as himself in an episode of I Dream of Jeannie (1967) and as a drug dealer in the film Easy Rider (1969).

In 1969, Spector made a brief return to the music business by signing a production deal with A&M Records. A Ronettes single, "You Came, You Saw, You Conquered" flopped, but Spector returned to the Hot 100 with "Black Pearl", by Sonny Charles and the Checkmates, Ltd., which reached number 13.

=== 1970–1973: Comeback and Beatles collaborations ===
In early 1970, Allen Klein, the new manager of the Beatles, brought Spector to England. After impressing with his production of John Lennon's solo single "Instant Karma!", which went to number 3, Spector was invited by Lennon and George Harrison to take on the task of turning the Beatles' abandoned Let It Be recording sessions into a usable album. He went to work using many of his production techniques, making significant changes to the arrangements and sound of some songs. Released a month after the Beatles' break-up, the album topped the U.S. and UK charts. It also yielded the number 1 U.S. single "The Long and Winding Road". Spector's overdubbing of "The Long and Winding Road" infuriated its composer, Paul McCartney. In addition to McCartney, several music critics also criticized Spector's work on Let It Be. Spector claimed this was partly due to resentment that an American producer appeared to be "taking over" such a popular English band. Lennon defended Spector, telling Jann Wenner of Rolling Stone: "he was given the shittiest load of badly recorded shit, with a lousy feeling toward it, ever. And he made something out of it. He did a great job."

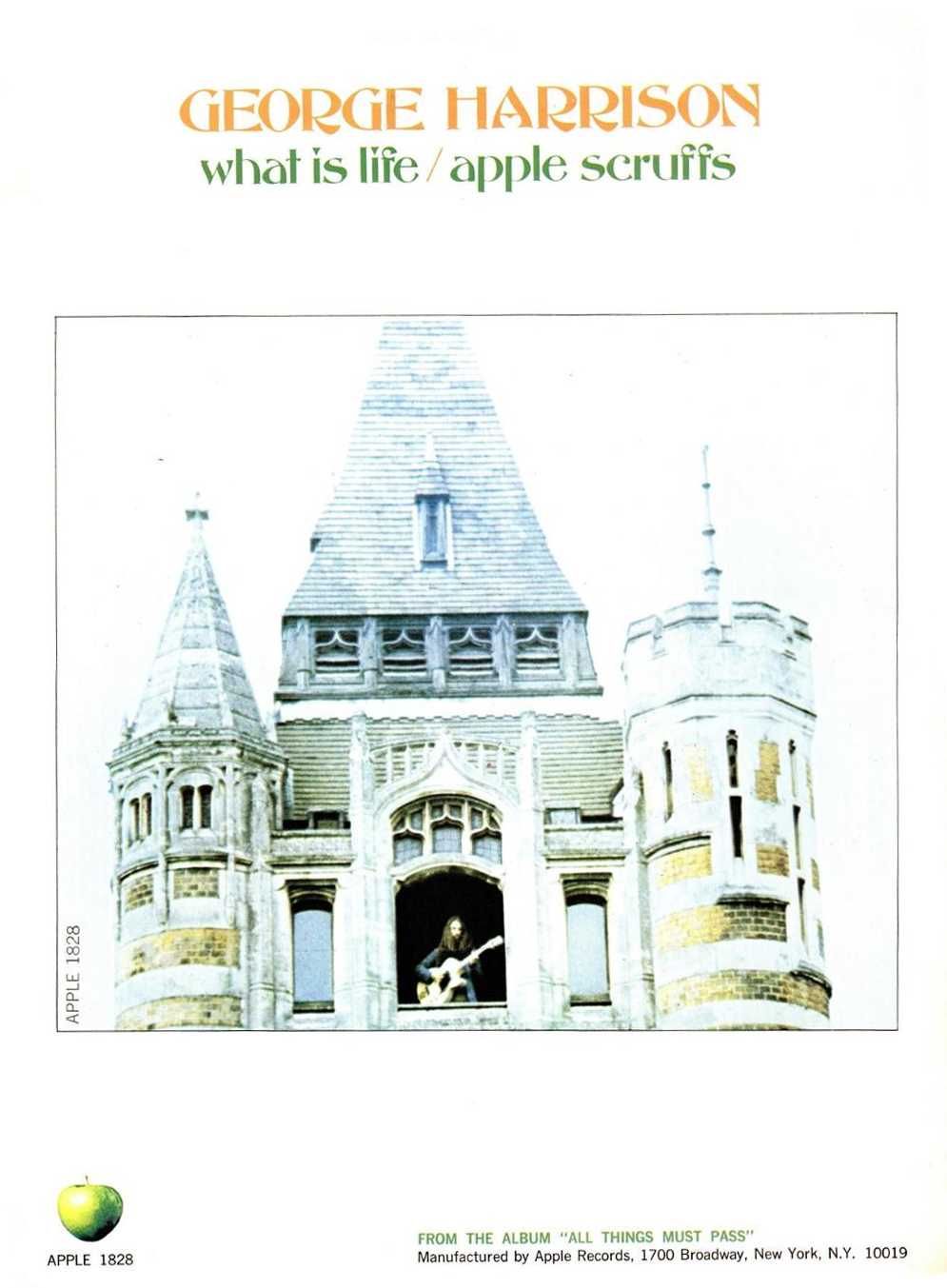
Trade ad for George Harrison's "What Is Life" single

For Harrison's multiplatinum album All Things Must Pass (number 1, 1970), Spector helped provide a symphonic ambience, although his health issues meant that after recording the basic tracks, he was absent from the project until the mixing stage. Rolling Stone's reviewer lauded the album's sound, calling it "Wagnerian, Brucknerian, the music of mountain tops and vast horizons". The triple LP yielded two major hits: "My Sweet Lord" (number 1) and "What Is Life" (number 10). That same year, Spector co-produced Lennon's Plastic Ono Band (number 6), a stark-sounding album devoid of any Wall of Sound extravagance. Through Harrison, he also produced the debut single by Derek and the Dominos, "Tell the Truth", but the band disliked the sound and had the record withdrawn.

Spector was made head of A&R for Apple Records. He held the post for only a year, during which he co-produced Lennon's 1971 single "Power to the People" (number 11) and his chart-topping album Imagine. The album's title track hit number 3. With Harrison, Spector co-produced Harrison's "Bangla Desh" (number 23)—rock's first charity single—and wife Ronnie Spector's "Try Some, Buy Some" (number 77). The latter was recorded for Ronnie's intended solo album on Apple Records, a project that stalled due to the same erratic, alcohol-fueled behavior from Spector that had hindered work on All Things Must Pass. Spector was convinced that the Harrison-written single would be a major hit, and its poor commercial performance was one of the biggest disappointments of his career. (Note: Spector also co-produced, with Lennon and Yoko Ono, the Elastic Oz Band's "God Save Us", a single protesting the jailing of Oz magazine's editors on obscenity charges.)

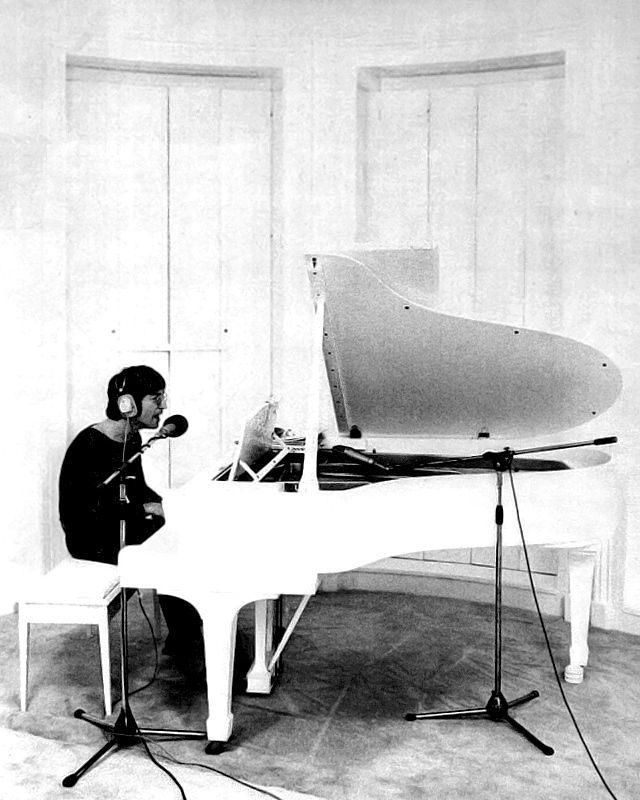
1971 Billboard ad for John Lennon's album Imagine

That same year Spector oversaw the live recording of the Harrison-organized Concert for Bangladesh shows in New York City, which resulted in the number 1 triple album The Concert for Bangladesh. The album won the "Album of the Year" award at the 1973 Grammys. Despite being recorded live, Spector used up to 44 microphones simultaneously to create his trademark Wall of Sound. Following Harrison's death in 2001, Spector said that the most creative period of his career was when he worked with Lennon and Harrison in the early 1970s, and he believed that this was true of Lennon and Harrison also, despite their achievements with the Beatles.

Lennon retained Spector for the 1971 Christmas single "Happy Xmas (War Is Over)" and the poorly reviewed 1972 album Some Time in New York City (number 48), both collaborations with Yoko Ono. In late 1972, Apple reissued Spector's A Christmas Gift for You from Philles Records (as Phil Spector's Christmas Album), bringing the recordings the commercial success and critical recognition that had originally eluded the 1963 release. Lennon and Ono's "Happy Xmas" single similarly stalled in sales upon its initial release, but later became a fixture on radio station playlists around Christmas.

Harrison and Spector started work on Harrison's Living in the Material World album in October 1972, but Spector's unreliability soon led to Harrison dismissing him from the project. Harrison recalled having to climb down into Spector's central London hotel room from the roof to get him to attend the sessions, and that his co-producer would then need "eighteen cherry brandies before he could get himself down to the studio". (Note: In the same 1987 interview, Harrison said Spector's problems with alcohol and his frequent hospitalisation typified their collaborations from 1970 onward. He nevertheless described the producer as "brilliant ... one of the greatest", adding, "he should be out there doing stuff right now—but not with me!")

In late 1973, Spector produced the initial recording sessions for what became Lennon's 1975 covers album Rock 'n' Roll (number 6). The sessions were held in Los Angeles, with Lennon allowing Spector free rein as producer for the first time, but were characterized by substance abuse and chaotic arrangements. Amid the party atmosphere, Spector brandished his handguns and at one point fired a shot while Lennon was recording. (Note: When asked about reports that Spector had fired his gun into the ceiling, Lennon said: "I don't like to tell tales out of school ... But I do know there was an awful loud noise in the toilet of the Record Plant West.") In December, Lennon and Spector abandoned the collaboration. Since the studio time had been booked by his production company, Spector withheld the tapes until June the following year, when Lennon reimbursed him through Capitol Records.

=== 1974–1980: Near-fatal accident, Warner-Spector Records, Leonard Cohen, and the Ramones ===
As the 1970s progressed, Spector became increasingly reclusive. The most probable and significant reason for his withdrawal, according to biographer Dave Thompson, was that in 1974 he was seriously injured when he was thrown through the windshield of his car in a crash in Hollywood. Spector was admitted to the UCLA Medical Center on the night of March 31, suffering serious head injuries that required several hours of surgery, with over 300 stitches to his face and more than 400 to the back of his head. His head injuries, Thompson suggests, were the reason that Spector began his habit of wearing outlandish wigs in later years.

He established the Warner-Spector label with Warner Bros. Records, which undertook new Spector-produced recordings with Cher, Darlene Love, Danny Potter, and Jerri Bo Keno, in addition to several reissues. A similar relationship with Britain's Polydor Records led to the formation of the Phil Spector International label in 1975. When the Cher and Keno singles (the latter's recordings were only issued in Germany) foundered on the charts, Spector released Dion DiMucci's Born to Be with You to little commercial fanfare in 1975; largely produced and recorded by Spector in 1974, it was subsequently disowned by the singer. In the 1990s and 2000s, the album enjoyed a resurgence among the indie rock cognoscenti.

Spector began to reemerge later in the decade, producing and co-writing a controversial 1977 album by Leonard Cohen, titled Death of a Ladies' Man. This angered many Cohen fans who preferred his stark acoustic sound to the orchestral and choral wall of sound that the album contains. The recording was fraught with difficulty. After Cohen had laid down practice vocal tracks, Spector mixed the album in studio sessions, rather than allowing Cohen to take a role in the mixing, as Cohen had previously done. Cohen remarked that the result is "grotesque", but also "semi-virtuous"—for many years, he included a reworked version of the track "Memories" in live concerts. Bob Dylan and Allen Ginsberg also participated in the background vocals on "Don't Go Home with Your Hard-On".

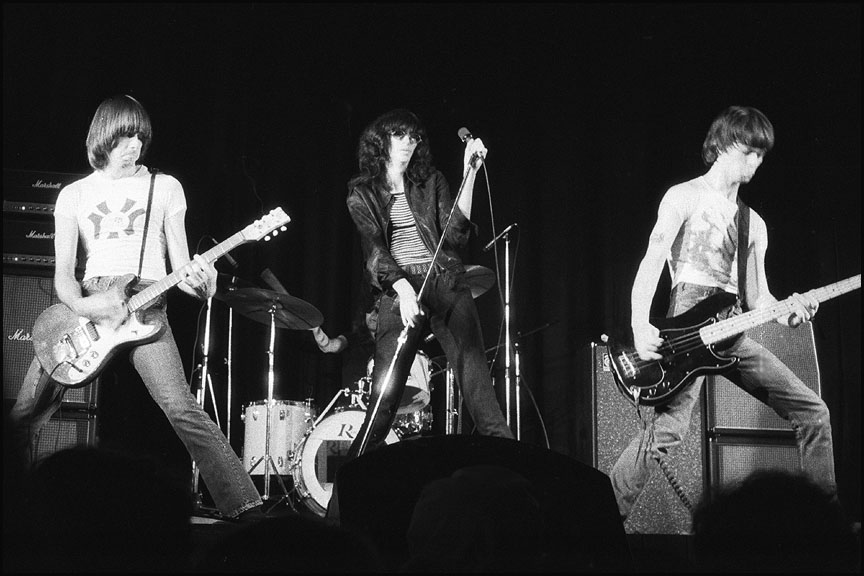
Ramones in 1977

Spector also produced the much-publicized Ramones album End of the Century in 1979. As with his work with Leonard Cohen, End of the Century received criticism from Ramones fans who were angered over its radio-friendly sound. However, it proved to be their highest-charting album, peaking at number 44 on the Billboard Hot 200. The album contains some of the best known and most successful Ramones singles, such as "Rock 'n' Roll High School", "Do You Remember Rock 'n' Roll Radio?", and their cover of a previously released Spector song for the Ronettes, "Baby, I Love You". (Note: Joey Ramone stated that working with his "idol" turned out to be everything he had expected. And the band name-checked Spector in the song "It's Not My Place (in the 9 to 5 World)" on their next album, Pleasant Dreams: "Hangin' out with Lester Bangs you all / And Phil Spector really has it all".) Guitarist Johnny Ramone later commented on working with Spector on the recording of the album, "It really worked when he got to a slower song like "Danny Says"—the production really worked tremendously. For the harder stuff, it didn't work as well."

Rumors circulated for years that Spector had threatened members of the Ramones with a gun during the sessions. Dee Dee Ramone claimed that Spector once pulled a gun on him when he tried to leave a session. Drummer Marky Ramone recalled in 2008, "They [guns] were there but he had a license to carry. He never held us hostage. We could have left at any time."

=== 1981–2009: Semi-hiatus ===
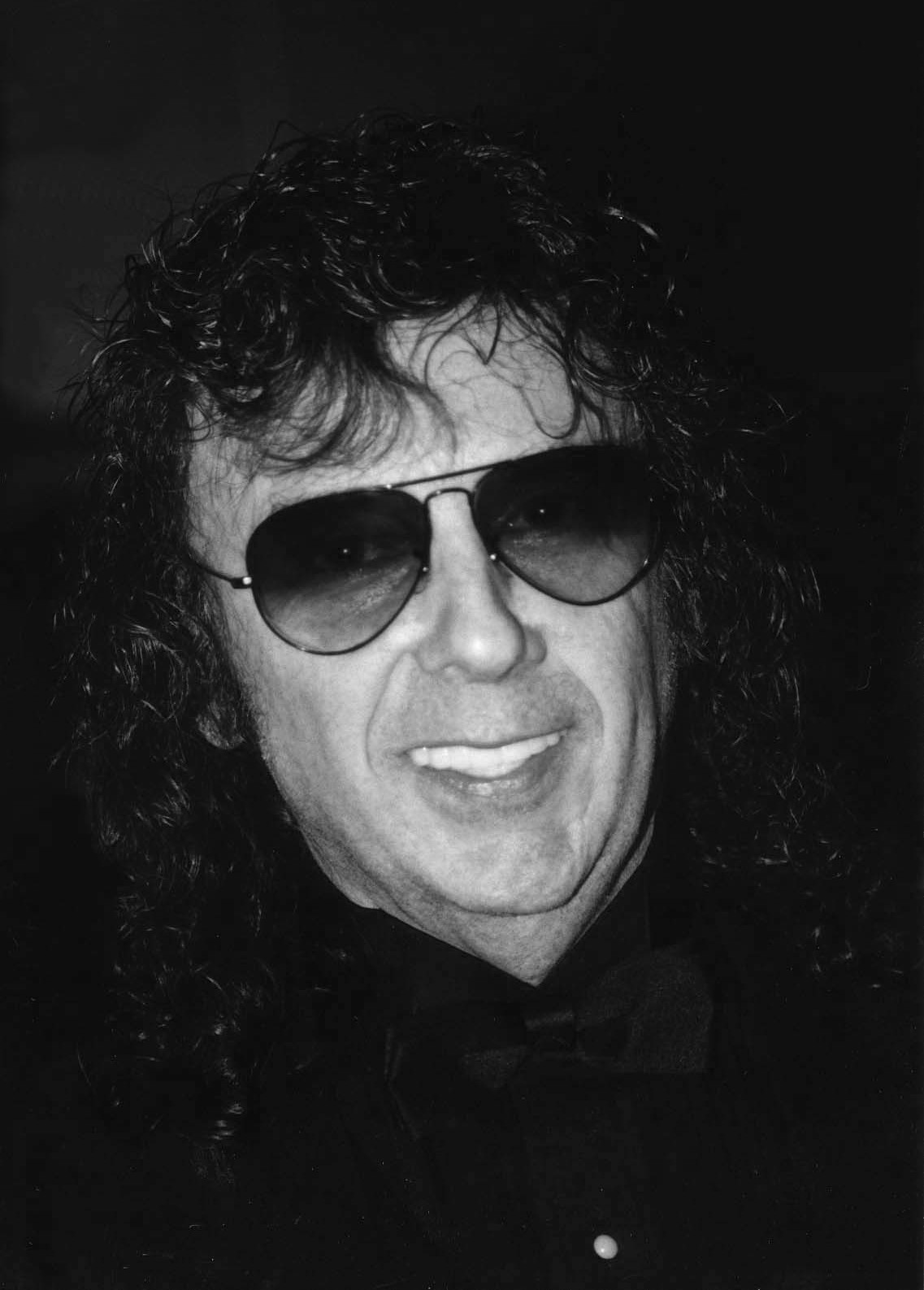
Spector in 2000

Spector remained inactive throughout most of the 1980s, 1990s, and early 2000s. In early 1981, shortly after the death of John Lennon, he temporarily re-emerged to co-produce Yoko Ono's Season of Glass. He attempted to work with Céline Dion on her 1996 album Falling into You but fell out with her production team. His last released project was Silence Is Easy by Starsailor, in 2003. He was originally supposed to produce the entire album, but was fired owing to personal and creative differences. One of the two Spector-produced songs on the album, the title track, was a UK top 10 single (the other single being "White Dove").

Amid his murder charge, Spector produced singer-songwriter Hargo Khalsa's track (known professionally as Hargo) "Crying for John Lennon", which originally appears on Hargo's 2006 album In Your Eyes. On a visit to Spector's mansion for an interview for the Lennon tribute film Strawberry Fields, Hargo played Spector the song and asked him to produce it.

In December 2007, Spector attended the funeral of Ike Turner. In his eulogy, Spector criticized Tina Turner's autobiography I, Tina—and its subsequent promotion by Oprah Winfrey—as a "badly written" book that "demonized and vilified Ike". Spector commented that "Ike made Tina the jewel she was. When I went to see Ike play at the Cinegrill in the '90s ... there were at least five Tina Turners on the stage performing that night, and any one of them could have been the real Tina Turner."

In mid-April 2008, BBC Two broadcast a special titled Phil Spector: The Agony and the Ecstasy, by Vikram Jayanti. It consists of Spector's first screen interview, breaking a long period of media silence.

By 2011, his catalog was controlled by EMI Publishing.

== Artistry and musical impact ==
=== Production and Wall of Sound ===
Spector is credited with redefining the role of the record producer as a central creative force, analogous to a film director, and with establishing a paradigm where the producer is credited as the primary artist. Before his emergence, the producer's role was not widely recognized as distinct from other recording disciplines and, through his independent label Philles Records, he created a new model for producing and marketing pop music. (Note: Spector later credited himself with originating both the phrase "record producer" and the field itself, stating he was "the first person that took the words A&R and called it 'producer'", however, he had numerous antecedents, including Les Paul, Sam Phillips, Milt Gabler, George Goldner, and John Hammond. In particular, Goldner's entrepreneurial methods and his practice of taking co-authorship credits on songs influenced Spector, who later emulated Goldner's independent business model and, in Williams' description, his "hustler" tactics. Williams adds that while the expansion of the producer's role from "an obscure backroom boy" was an inevitability, "it is equally certain" that Spector catalyzed this trend.) In contrast to the rapid, high-volume release strategy of other labels, he released relatively few singles, a large percentage of which became hits. He was the first producer to exert comprehensive control over every artistic aspect of a record's production and the first associated with a signature style, later termed the "Wall of Sound". In a 1965 profile published by the New York Herald Tribune, journalist Tom Wolfe dubbed Spector the "first tycoon of teen". Wolfe's article also propagated inaccuracies that reinforced myths about him working in isolation, among other embellishments. (Note: Spector is also credited as the first "star" producer. Jerry Wexler, who followed the standard artist-engineer intermediary approach exemplified by Hammond, later defined two preexisting categories of producer, one being the "documentarian", which preserved the performer's raw sound, and the other, in which Wexler placed himself, as the "servant of the project". In Wexler's belief, Spector originated a third: "the producer as star, as artist, as unifying force.")

[Phil Spector] understood better than anyone that a recording studio could do things which could never actually happen ...

— Brian Eno

Spector was among the first producers to use the studio as an instrument. His productions were instrumental in pop music's transition from the 1950s ideal of faithfully capturing a musical performance to the 1960s studio-centric practice and advanced the idea of the recording itself as a distinct art form. (Note: While recognizing Joe Meek as both "the first record producer in the world" and "the first to manipulate every element of the track", author and musician Bob Stanley credits Spector as singularly pivotal in advancing "the sonic impact of pop, to turn the studio into an instrument, and to elevate the teenage experience into an art form".) With his Wall of Sound technique, he desired a densely layered orchestral pop aesthetic that reconceived rock and roll on a scale evoking symphonic works by figures such as Richard Wagner. (Note: While Spector was often compared to Wagner, such comparisons have been widely rejected by classical music scholars.) He employed a large group of session musicians, known as the Wrecking Crew, playing in unison to create a combined timbre from each instrumental grouping, alongside substantial reverb and echo effects. Spector described his records as "little symphonies for the kids" and viewed his production as a form of compositional input, a belief he leveraged to negotiate co-writing credits on songs. Many of his songwriters came from the Brill Building, including teams such as Carole King and Gerry Goffin, Barry Mann and Cynthia Weil, and Jeff Barry and Ellie Greenwich. According to biographer Mick Brown, Spector's approach consumed "unprecedented" time and resources at a time when the dominant perception of pop was of a transient commodity made quickly and cheaply.

Dozens of imitative Wall of Sound recordings by other producers were released from 1962 to 1965 and numerous recordings during the 1960s paid explicit tribute to Spector, including "Sha La La La Lee" by Simon and Pi, produced by Mark Wirtz as a stated tribute, and the Attack's "Please Phil Spector". Author and musician Virgil Moorefield writes that Spector's use of the studio as an orchestral instrument defined him as "the quintessential pop-rock producer" and "inspired a great many producers who followed him". In his 2007 book about American popular music, Starr attributes the increasing prominence of record producers after the 1960s, including George Martin's work with the Beatles, directly to "Spector's contribution and notoriety [...] And when today's bands labor painstakingly for a year or more over the studio production of a disc, they are demonstrating, knowingly or not, Spector's legacy at work." (Note: MacLeod surmised that Spector's precedent influenced later managers and producers in "their awareness and approach to the music industry", citing the examples of Brian Wilson, Paul McCartney, Bruce Springsteen, and David Geffen.)

=== Youth culture, girl group sound and rock music ===
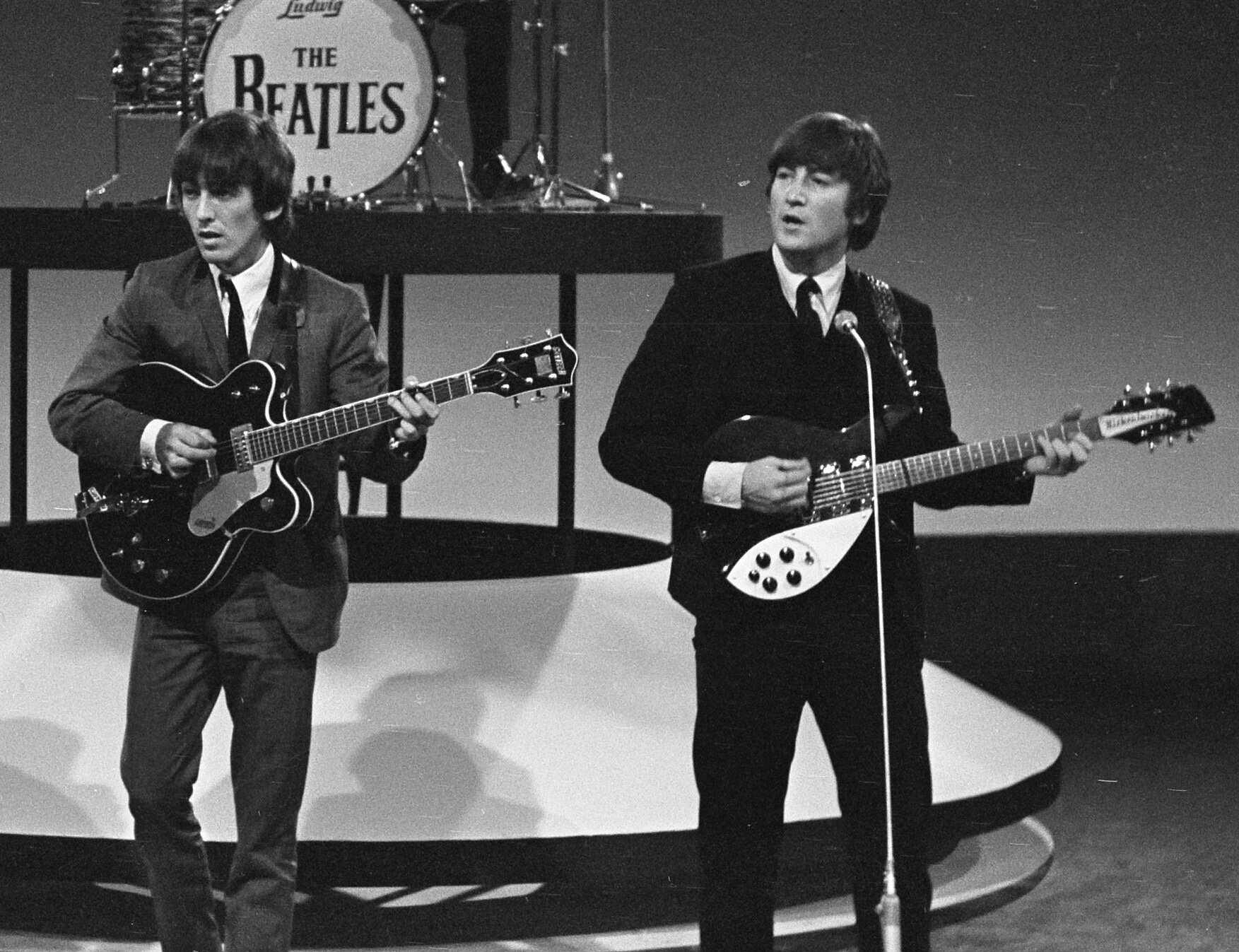
Spector influenced and helped facilitate the success of teen-oriented bands such as the Beatles. John Lennon (right) later stated, "Spector kept rock 'n' roll alive while Elvis was in the army".

At age 21, Spector was the youngest U.S. label owner, and in journalist Richard Williams' estimation, "revolutionized the industry's attitude to youth". His success helped sustain the visibility of rock-oriented pop on American radio following the cessation of several prominent rock 'n' performers at the end of the 1950s and positioned teenage listeners and pop music as a substantial and increasingly influential commercial market. Musicologist Sean MacLeod argued that his songs, which engaged in themes of romantic idealism, emotional uncertainty, and challenging "traditional values", contributed to the emergence of the 1960s youth culture and the success of both the British Invasion and acts such as the Beatles, the Rolling Stones, Bob Dylan, and the Beach Boys. Beach Boys leader Brian Wilson sought to expand on Spector's innovations and, in author Mark Ribowsky's description, joined with Spector as "twin leviathans of American rock and roll in the early and mid-sixties".

Elements of Spector's approach were absorbed into broader rock music and the work of his collaborators. Philles' early success helped prompt the founding of Red Bird Records in 1964 by Leiber, Stoller, and George Goldner, with Barry and Greenwich as staff writers. According to critic Mark Deming, Spector's success with the Paris Sisters and the Teddy Bears, whose aesthetic overlapped with the vocal style common to 1950s female pop and the orientation that later defined early-1960s girl-group records, paved the subsequent emergence of singers such as Lesley Gore and the Shangri-Las' Mary Weiss. His recordings for the Crystals built upon the Shirelles' girl-group template and subsequently influenced Hank Medress' productions for the Chiffons, according to Williams, while his crossover success with black artists helped enable the visibility of subsequent black performers and led Motown founder Berry Gordy to adopt Brill Building practices and aspects of Spector's business and production approach. (Note: Spector held Gordy "in singularly high regard", according to Brown, although Supremes singer Diana Ross stated: "Berry never mentioned the Ronettes or the Crystals or Phil Spector. He never talked about the opposition at all. He was so individual in his approach to his groups, his people and how he ran things.")

Spector's influence extended to surf music, especially groups such as Jan & Dean, and French yé-yé. In Britain, Spector's girl group productions, together with the Motown sound, formed part of the early-1960s mod culture, associated with bands such as the Rolling Stones and the Who. Williams states that British groups of 1963 onwards were largely unaffected by Spector, with the significant exception of the Rolling Stones, whose producer Andrew Loog Oldham incorporated elements of Spector's technique in their early recordings.

=== Psychedelia, art rock, and later popular music ===
After the mid-1960s, Spector's influence extended across the development of subsequent popular music genres and recordings, including psychedelia and albums such as the Beach Boys' Pet Sounds (1966) and the Beatles' Sgt. Pepper's Lonely Hearts Club Band (1967). (Note: Stanley framed Spector's temporary withdrawal from music, coinciding with the release of Pet Sounds, as an admission that the pop industry "had caught up with [him]".) According to musicologist John Covach, the "most artistically ambitious" early 1960s girl-group productions, including those by Spector, the "most important producer of girl-group pop", provided a direct precedent for the experimental approach that characterized later psychedelic rock.

Music critic Stephen Holden traced the mid-1960s emergence of art pop to the adoption of "quasi-symphonic" textures in pop recording, citing the "Wagnerian" character associated with his productions among progenitors. In the description of author Matthew Bannister, he had mirrored "the auteur theory of cinema, or the centrality of the composer in classical tradition", and drawing on Williams' analysis, described him as the earliest art rock figure. Music journalist and author Evan Eisenberg identified Spector's output as "perhaps the first fully self-conscious phonography in the popular field" and Spector himself as the first producer-auteur in popular music, whose "immense" influence on contemporaries such as the Beatles and Frank Zappa led the transition to the album era and transformed "kitsch into Dada." (Note: Spector later stated, "I heard a different kind of rock and roll than Fats Domino or Chuck Berry, who were big influences for me. I didn't want to imitate or copy them. [...] I thought that what I was doing was a little too sophisticated compared to Fats Domino." Ribowsky argued that rather than introducing a higher level of "sophistication", as is often suggested, Spector repurposed antiquated technology to create "a new formula [...] It was crazy for Spector to cram two dozen instruments into his studio, but in his hands the aural effect was a tool of purpose. Thus, Spector needed the technology of the fifties to recast rock in the sixties.") Writing in 1981, sociomusicologist Simon Frith identified Spector's self-imposed retirement in 1966, alongside Brian Wilson's withdrawal in 1967, as the catalysts for the "rock/pop split that has afflicted American music ever since".

In the 1970s, subsequent artists, such as Wizzard, Bruce Springsteen, and Elton John, enjoyed commercial success with variants of Spector's production style. Later in the decade, elements of his sound were adopted by new wave bands such as Blondie and the Go-Go's. He significantly influenced popular music in Japan, particularly the artist-producers Tatsuro Yamashita and Eiichi Ohtaki, and the 1990s Shibuya-kei movement. His approach informed independent and noise pop acts, including 1980s groups such as the Jesus and Mary Chain and Cocteau Twins, as well as 21st-century bands like the Raveonettes and Dum Dum Girls. Shoegaze, an alternative rock subgenre, also drew from the Wall of Sound. MacLeod additionally argues that elements of Spector's sound can be heard in later artists and production teams such as the Smiths; Stock, Aitken, and Waterman; Amy Winehouse; the Spice Girls; Vivian Girls; and the Pipettes.

== Personal life and murder conviction ==
=== Relationships and children ===
I think Phil was a very normal person at the beginning of his career. But as time went on, they started writing about his being a genius. And he said, "Yeah, I am a genius." And then they would say, "He's the mad genius." And so he became the mad genius.

— Ronnie Spector

Spector's first marriage was in 1963 to Annette Merar, lead vocalist of the Spectors Three, a 1960s pop trio formed and produced by Spector. He named a record company after Merar, Annette Records. Spector and Merar divorced in 1966. While still married to Merar, he began having an affair with Ronnie Bennett, later known as Ronnie Spector. Bennett was the lead singer of the girl group the Ronettes (another group Spector managed and produced). They married in 1968 and adopted a son, Donté Phillip Spector. As a Christmas present, Spector surprised her by adopting twins Louis Phillip Spector and Gary Phillip Spector.

In her 1990 memoir, Be My Baby: How I Survived Mascara, Miniskirts And Madness, Bennett alleged that Spector had imprisoned her in his California mansion and subjected her to years of psychological torment. According to Bennett, Spector sabotaged her career by forbidding her to perform, and she escaped from the mansion barefoot with the help of her mother in 1972. In their 1974 divorce settlement, she forfeited all future record earnings and surrendered custody of their children. She alleged that this was because Spector had threatened to hire a hitman to kill her.

Spector's son Donté told The Daily Mail in 2003 that he and his brother Gary were "kept captive as children" and were "forced to perform simulated intercourse" with Spector's then-girlfriend. According to Donté, "I was blindfolded and sexually molested. Dad would say, 'You're going to meet someone,' and it would be a 'learning experience'." Gary subsequently rejected his brother's claims, stating of his father, "He was not a people person… [but] he shows in his own way that he cares."

In 1982, Spector had twin children with his girlfriend Janis Zavala: Nicole Audrey Spector and Phillip Spector Jr.; Phillip Jr. died of leukemia in 1991. On September 1, 2006, while on bail and awaiting trial, Spector married his third wife Rachelle Short, who was 26 at the time (Spector was 67). Spector filed for divorce in April 2016, claiming irreconcilable differences. They divorced in 2018.

=== Clarkson murder, imprisonment, and death ===
On February 3, 2003, Spector shot actress Lana Clarkson in the mouth while in his mansion, the Pyrenees Castle, in Alhambra, California. Her body was found slumped in a chair. Spector told Esquire in July 2003 that Clarkson's death was an "accidental suicide" and that she "kissed the gun". The emergency call from Spector's home, made by Spector's driver, Adriano de Souza, quotes Spector as saying, "I think I killed somebody." De Souza added that he saw Spector come out of the back door of the house with a gun in his hand.

Spector testified in a 2005 court deposition that he had been treated for bipolar disorder for eight years, saying, "No sleep, depression, mood changes, mood swings, hard to live with, hard to concentrate, just hard—a hard time getting through life, I've been called a genius and I think a genius is not there all the time and has borderline insanity." He remained free on $1 million bail while awaiting trial. On March 19, 2007, Spector's murder trial began. Presiding Judge Larry Paul Fidler allowed the proceedings in Los Angeles Superior Court to be televised. Defense expert and forensic pathologist Vincent Di Maio said that Spector might be suffering from Parkinson's disease, stating, "Look at Mr. Spector. He has Parkinson's features. He trembles." On September 26, Fidler declared a mistrial because of a hung jury (ten to two for conviction).

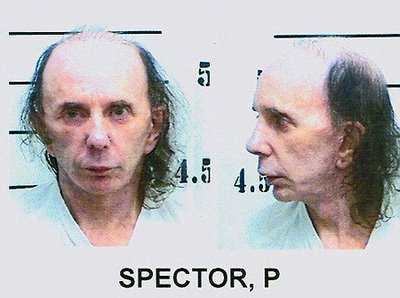
2009 mug shot

The retrial of Spector for murder in the second degree began on October 20, 2008, with Judge Fidler again presiding; the retrial was not televised. Spector was once again represented by attorney Jennifer Lee Barringer. The case went to the jury on March 26, 2009, and 18 days later, on April 13, the jury returned a guilty verdict. Additionally, Spector was found guilty of using a firearm in the commission of a crime, which added four years to the sentence. On May 29, 2009, he was sentenced to 19 years to life in the California state prison system. He would have been eligible for parole in 2024.

Various attempted appeals, in 2011, 2012, and 2016, were unsuccessful. California Department of Corrections photos from 2013 (released in September 2014) showed evidence of a progressive deterioration in Spector's health, according to observers. He had been an inmate at the California Health Care Facility (a prison hospital) in Stockton since October 2013. In September 2014, it was reported that Spector had lost his ability to speak, owing to laryngeal papillomatosis.

Spector was diagnosed with COVID-19 in December 2020. He was taken to San Joaquin General Hospital in French Camp, California, on December 31, and intubated the next month. Spector died in an outside hospital on January 16, 2021, at the age of 81, according to the California Department of Corrections and Rehabilitation. His daughter Nicole attributed her father's death to complications of COVID-19.

== Legacy and cultural depictions ==
Spector is widely regarded as one of the most influential figures in pop music history and the most successful producer of the 1960s. He produced five number-one singles and 19 top-ten singles that appeared on the Billboard Hot 100 between 1958 and 1971 and he is one of few producers to have number one records in three consecutive decades (1950s, 1960s and 1970s). His music has appeared in many films, with prominent usages in Martin Scorsese's Mean Streets (1973) and Goodfellas (1990). (Note: His songs also appeared in The Big Wednesday (1978), Quadrophenia (1979), Stripes (1981), Sixteen Candles (1984), Top Gun (1986), Little Shop of Horrors (1986), Adventures in Babysitting (1987), The Pick-Up Artist (1987), and Dirty Dancing (1987).) In 1989, he was inducted by Tina Turner into the Rock and Roll Hall of Fame as a non-performer. (Note: Rolling Stone reported, "Spector hit the stage bopping madly to the strains of the Ronettes' "Be My Baby", flanked by three beefy bodyguards who practically elbowed Tina out of the way. He mumbled a few incoherent words about George H. W. Bush and the presidential inauguration, and then his bodyguards carried him away again.") He was inducted into the Songwriters Hall of Fame in 1997 and received the Grammy Trustees Award in 2000. (Note: In 1994, Spector wrote a letter to the Rock and Roll Hall of Fame's nominating committee to oppose the Ronettes being considered for induction. He argued that the group was not a proper recording act and did not contribute enough to music to merit an induction. The Ronettes were eventually inducted into the Hall, but not until 2007.) In 2004, he was ranked number 63 on Rolling Stone's list of the greatest artists in history, and in 2008, was ranked second, behind George Martin, in The Washington Times' list of the greatest record producers in history. "You've Lost That Lovin' Feelin'" was the most-played song on American radio and television until 2019.

So much time had passed since his heyday that most of the people who heard about his arrest from the newspapers or the television were unaware of what it was he had done to make himself famous. But there was no shortage of those willing to testify that whatever Spector had become, once upon a time he was among the great innovators of popular music ...

— Biographer and music journalist Richard Williams, 2003

After the 1970s, Spector had maintained a reclusive lifestyle while numerous legends and rumors regarding his eccentric behavior circulated. He has been depicted or referenced in several biographical films and television productions; fictional characters inspired by his public image include Ronnie "Z-Man" Barzell in Beyond the Valley of the Dolls (1970) and Swan in Phantom of the Paradise (1974). Richard Williams' 2003 revision of his 1972 Spector biography stated of the producer's reputation after the 1970s, "he had turned into Ronnie 'Z-Man' Barzell [...] a character based on an apparently absurd exaggeration of the salient features of Spector's early years but now transformed with horrible literalness into a self-fulfilling prophecy." MacLeod states that "Spector has been primarily known for his Wall of Sound productions", although following his murder charge, his musical contributions were "slowly being forgotten" and he "became more of a curiosity to people, who were becoming to regard him as a freak". (Note: In his 1989 book He's a Rebel, Mark Ribowsky praised Spector as "a recluse in the truest, proudest sense" and viewed him as "a stately heroic figure". In the later revised edition, he wrote he had been "dead wrong" in his original assessment of Spector's character: "The other Phil Spector—the scaly night-crawling pod—deserves not a word of praise. But since I can't separate the two, I must try to live, however uneasily, with him as a whole.")

Upon his death in 2021, former associates and other figures offered mixed public acknowledgements, some of whom expressed a wish for him to be remembered separately from his body of work. (Note: Ronnie Spector issued a statement saying, in part, "It's a sad day for music and a sad day for me [...] he was a brilliant producer, but a lousy husband. [...] The music will be forever". Darlene Love commented that she hoped his musical impact would not remain overshadowed by his criminal conviction, while guitarist Stevie Van Zandt called him a "genius irredeemably conflicted [...] the ultimate example of the art always being better than the artist".) Referencing the musicians' association with Spector, session player Carol Kaye later remarked that "a piece of us were on trial, too". Some media outlets received criticism for their coverage; the obituaries in The New York Times and Rolling Stone originally stated, respectively, that Spector's legacy "was marred by a murder conviction" and that his "life was upended" after being sentenced. These obituaries were revised following a social media backlash.

In 2022, Showtime premiered Spector, a four-part docuseries directed by Don Argott and Sheena M. Joyce. The series dedicated equal focus to Clarkson and Spector with participation from Clarkson's family, Spector's daughter Nicole, and his former associates. The directors stated their intention was to portray both subjects accurately and neutrally without a definite resolution as to the broader question of separating an artist's work from their personal actions.

=== In popular culture ===
- Beyond the Valley of the Dolls (1970): The character of Ronnie "Z-Man" Barzell is based upon Spector, though neither Russ Meyer nor screenwriter Roger Ebert had met him.
- Phantom of the Paradise (1974): The villainous character Swan (played by Paul Williams) was inspired by Spector. A music producer and head of a record label, Swan was named "Spectre" in original drafts of the film's screenplay.
- What's Love Got to Do with It (1993): Spector is portrayed by Rob LaBelle.
- Grace of My Heart (1996): The film contains many characters based upon 1960s musicians, writers and producers including the character Joel Milner played by John Turturro (based on Spector).
- In the docudrama And the Beat Goes On: The Sonny and Cher Story, Phil Spector is portrayed by Christian Leffler.
- Metalocalypse (2006–2013): The character Dick "Magic Ears" Knubbler is a parody of Spector, based on profession, appearance and record of assault.
- A Reasonable Man (2009): Harv Stevens is reportedly based on Spector. The film examines his relationship with John Lennon.
- "Christmas Kids": A song included on I Can't Handle Change, a 2010 EP about the history of the relationship between Ronnie and Phil Spector.
- Phil Spector (2013): Spector is portrayed by Al Pacino. The film was met with overwhelming controversy and criticism, including from biographer Mick Brown, with regards to its fictionalized embellishments and sympathetic depiction of Spector.
- Love & Mercy (2014): Spector is portrayed by Jonathan Slavin in a scene that was cut from the theatrical release.

== Awards and accolades ==
Awards and nominations

Year	Nominee / work	Award	Result
1972	George Harrison "My Sweet Lord"	Grammy Award for Record of the Year	Nominated
1972	George Harrison All Things Must Pass	Grammy Award for Album of the Year	Nominated
1973	George Harrison & Friends The Concert for Bangladesh	Grammy Award for Album of the Year	Won
1989	Phil Spector	Rock and Roll Hall of Fame	Inducted
1997	Phil Spector	Songwriter's Hall of Fame	Inducted
2000	Phil Spector	Grammy Trustees Award	Won

== Bibliography ==
- Bannister, Matthew (2007). White Boys, White Noise: Masculinities and 1980s Indie Guitar Rock. Ashgate Publishing. ISBN 978-0-7546-8803-7.
- Brown, Mick (2006). Tearing Down the Wall of Sound: The Rise and Fall of Phil Spector. London: Bloomsbury. ISBN 978-1-4000-4219-7.
- Brown, Mick (2007) [2006]. Tearing Down the Wall of Sound: The Rise and Fall of Phil Spector. London: Bloomsbury. ISBN 978-1-4000-4219-7.
- Covach, John (2012). What's That Sound? An Introduction to Rock and Its History (3rd ed.). New York: W. W. Norton & Company. ISBN 9780393912043.
- Doggett, Peter (2011). You Never Give Me Your Money: The Beatles After the Breakup. New York: It Books. ISBN 978-0-06-177418-8.
- Edmondson, Jacqueline, ed. (2013). Music in American Life: An Encyclopedia of the Songs, Styles, Stars, and Stories that Shaped our Culture. ABC-CLIO. ISBN 978-0-313-39348-8.
- Eisenberg, Evan (2005). The Recording Angel: Music, Records and Culture from Aristotle to Zappa. New Haven: Yale University Press. ISBN 9780300099041.
- Frontani, Michael (2009). "The Solo Years". In Womack, Kenneth (ed.). The Cambridge Companion to the Beatles. Cambridge, UK: Cambridge University Press. ISBN 978-0-521-68976-2.
- Hamelman, Steve (2009). "On Their Way Home: The Beatles in 1969 and 1970". In Womack, Kenneth (ed.). The Cambridge Companion to the Beatles. Cambridge, UK: Cambridge University Press. ISBN 978-0-521-68976-2.
- MacLeod, Sean (2017). Phil Spector: Sound of the Sixties. Lanham: Rowman & Littlefield. ISBN 978-1-4422-6705-3.
- Madinger, Chip; Easter, Mark (2000). Eight Arms to Hold You: The Solo Beatles Compendium. Chesterfield, MO: 44.1 Productions. ISBN 0-615-11724-4.
- Moorefield, Virgil (2005). The Producer as Composer: Shaping the Sounds of Popular Music. Massachusetts: MIT Press. ISBN 0262134578.
- Ribowsky, Mark (1989). He's a Rebel: The Truth About Phil Spector – Rock and Roll's Legendary Madman. New York: Dutton. ISBN 978-0-525-24727-2.
- Ribowsky, Mark (2006) [1989]. He's a Rebel: Phil Spector – Rock and Roll's Legendary Producer. Cambridge, MA: Da Capo Press. ISBN 978-0-306-81471-6.
- Schaffner, Nicholas (1978). The Beatles Forever. New York: McGraw-Hill. ISBN 0-07-055087-5.
- Spizer, Bruce (2005). The Beatles Solo on Apple Records. New Orleans: 498 Productions. ISBN 0-9662649-5-9.
- Stanley, Bob (2013). Yeah Yeah Yeah: The Story of Modern Pop. London: Faber and Faber. ISBN 9780393242690.
- Starr, Larry (2007) [2006]. American Popular Music: From Minstrelsy to MP3 (2nd ed.). New York: Oxford University Press. ISBN 9780195300536.
- Thompson, Dave (2003). Wall of Pain: The Biography of Phil Spector. London: Sanctuary. ISBN 978-1-86074-543-0.
- Williams, Richard (2003) [1972]. Phil Spector: Out of His Head (illustrated, revised ed.). London: Omnibus. ISBN 9780711998643.
- Zak, Albin J. (2001). The Poetics of Rock: Cutting Tracks, Making Records. Berkeley: University of California Press. ISBN 9780520232242.
