= Cloudy with a Chance of Meatballs (franchise) =

Science fiction comedy media franchise

- Created by: Phil Lord; Chris Miller
- Original work: Cloudy with a Chance of Meatballs (2009)
- Owner: Sony Pictures Animation
- Years: 2009–2018
- Based on: Cloudy with a Chance of Meatballs By Judi Barrett

Films and television
- Film(s): Cloudy with a Chance of Meatballs (2009); Cloudy with a Chance of Meatballs 2 (2013)
- Short film(s): Super Manny (2013); Earl Scouts (2013); Steve's First Bath (2014); Attack of the 50-Foot Gummi Bear (2014)
- Television series: Cloudy with a Chance of Meatballs (2017–18)

Games
- Video game(s): Cloudy with a Chance of Meatballs (2009); Cloudy with a Chance of Meatballs 2 (2013); Foodimal Frenzy (2013)

Cloudy with a Chance of Meatballs is an American media franchise produced by Sony Pictures Animation and loosely based on the book of the same name by Judi Barrett. The franchise began with the 2009 film Cloudy with a Chance of Meatballs. The films have received generally positive reviews from critics. The series has grossed $517 million at the box office.

The franchise revolves around Flint Lockwood, a genius inventor who invents the FLDSMDFR, a machine that creates food out of water. Despite its success, the device's power unintentionally creates havoc and natural disasters of which Flint and his friends have to stop.

== Feature films ==
=== Cloudy with a Chance of Meatballs (2009) ===
Flint Lockwood, a young failed inventor, builds a machine that can turn water into food and calls it the Flint Lockwood Diatomic Super Mutating Dynamic Food Replicator, or FLDSMDFR for short. The townspeople of Swallow Falls, a tiny island that had nothing but sardines for food, benefit from the food weather that the machine brings, until the foods increase in size and the weather becomes unstable. Flint eventually loses all control of the FLDSMDFR and must shut it down before the world is destroyed.

=== Cloudy with a Chance of Meatballs 2 (2013) ===
After having seemingly destroyed the FLDSMDFR, Flint Lockwood is determined to prove himself a great inventor. He is given the chance by his idol Chester V, who informs him that his machine survived and has turned the island of Swallow Falls into a dangerous, tropical jungle full of sentient food creatures based on existing animals. Flint teams up with his friends and they return to the island to shut down the machine. When they realize that Chester V has his own plans for them, they set off to stop him and protect the foodimals.

=== Unproduced third film ===
In September 2023, Phil Lord stated that a script was completed for a third installment before the 2023 Writers Guild of America strike, entitled Planet of the Grapes.

== Television series ==
=== Cloudy with a Chance of Meatballs (2017–2018) ===
On October 9, 2014, DHX Media announced that it would develop and produce a television series based on the film franchise, titled Cloudy with a Chance of Meatballs, released on March 6, 2017 in the United States and April 6 of the same year in Canada. The series is traditionally animated and consists of 26 22-minute episodes. It takes place before the first film, showing Flint Lockwood as an intellectually gifted high school student with a passion for science and technology who dreams of becoming a scientist and inventor. In his adventures, he is joined by Sam Sparks, a new girl in town and the school's "wannabe" reporter, along with Flint's dad Tim, Steve the Monkey, Manny as the head of the school's audiovisual club, Earl as a school gym teacher, Brent as a baby wear model, and mayor Shelbourne. DHX Media handles the global television and non-US home entertainment distribution, along with worldwide merchandising rights, while Sony distributes home entertainment in the US. Commissioned by Teletoon in Canada, the series airs on Cartoon Network in the United States, and on the Boomerang channel in other territories.

== Short films ==
- Super Manny: a short film, released in October 26, 2013.
- Earl Scouts: A short film, released on October 26, 2013.
- Steve's First Bath: Released on January 28, 2014.
- Attack of the 50-Foot Gummi Bear: Released on January 28, 2014.

== Cast and characters ==
List indicator
- A dark gray cell indicates the character did not appear in that installment.
- An ^{A} indicates an appearance through previously recorded material.
- A ^{U} indicates an actor or actress was uncredited for their role.
- A ^{Y} indicates an actor or actress voiced a younger version of their character.

Characters	Films		Short films				Television series	
Characters	Cloudy with a Chance of Meatballs	Cloudy with a Chance of Meatballs 2	Super Manny	Earl Scouts	Steve's First Bath	Attack of the 50-Foot Gummi Bear	Cloudy with a Chance of Meatballs	
Characters	Cloudy with a Chance of Meatballs	Cloudy with a Chance of Meatballs 2	Super Manny	Earl Scouts	Steve's First Bath	Attack of the 50-Foot Gummi Bear	Season 1	Season 2
Flint Lockwood	Bill Hader	Bill Hader			Bill Hader	Bill Hader	Mark Edwards	Mark Edwards
Flint Lockwood	Max Neuwirth^{Y}	Bridget Hoffman^{Y}			Bill Hader	Bill Hader	Mark Edwards	Mark Edwards
Samantha "Sam" Sparks	Anna Faris	Anna Faris	Anna Faris		Anna Faris		Katie Griffin	Katie Griffin
Tim Lockwood	James Caan	James Caan					Seán Cullen	Seán Cullen
Steven "Steve"	Neil Patrick Harris	Neil Patrick Harris			Neil Patrick Harris	Neil Patrick Harris	Mark Edwards	Mark Edwards
Brent McHale	Andy Samberg	Andy Samberg					David Berni	David Berni
Officer Earl Devereaux	Mr. T	Terry Crews		Terry Crews			Clé Bennett	Clé Bennett
Officer Earl Devereaux	Mr. T	Mr. T^{A}		Terry Crews			Clé Bennett	Clé Bennett
Manny	Benjamin Bratt	Benjamin Bratt	Benjamin Bratt				Patrick McKenna	Patrick McKenna
Calvin "Cal" Devereaux	Bobb'e J. Thompson	Khamani Griffin					Baby sounds only	Uncredited voice actor
Patrick Patrickson	Al Roker	Al Roker						
Mayor Susan Shelbourne	Bruce Campbell	Silent cameo in end credits					Seán Cullen	Seán Cullen
Fran Lockwood	Lauren Graham	Painting					Uncredited voice actress	Painting
Regina Devereaux	Angela Shelton	Silent cameo					Kim Roberts^{U}	Uncredited voice actress
Joseph "Joe" Towne	Will Forte	Silent cameo					Character is mute	Character is mute
Chester V		Will Forte						
Barb		Kristen Schaal						
Barry		Cody Cameron		Cody Cameron				Character is mute
Dill Pickles		Cody Cameron		Cody Cameron				
Flinty McCallahan		Craig Kellman						
Idea Pants Guy		Craig Kellman						
Gil Shelbourne							Patrick McKenna	Patrick McKenna
Old Rick							Seán Cullen	Seán Cullen

- A dark gray cell indicates the character does not appear.

== Crew ==
Role	Films	
Role	Cloudy with a Chance of Meatballs	Cloudy with a Chance of Meatballs 2
Director(s)	Phil Lord & Christopher Miller	Kris Pearn & Cody Cameron
Producer(s)	Pam Marsden	Pam Marsden & Kirk Bodyfelt
Writer(s)	Phil Lord & Christopher Miller	Story by: Phil Lord; Christopher Miller; Erica Rivinoja Screenplay by: Erica Rivinoja; John Francis Daley; Jonathan Goldstein
Executive Producer(s)	Yair Landau	Phil Lord & Christopher Miller
Composer	Mark Mothersbaugh	Mark Mothersbaugh
Editor	Robert Fisher Jr.	Robert Fisher Jr.
Studio	Columbia Pictures; Sony Pictures Animation	Columbia Pictures; Sony Pictures Animation
Distributors	Sony Pictures Releasing	Sony Pictures Releasing

== Reception ==
=== Box office performance ===
Film	U.S. release date	Box office gross			All-time ranking		Budget (millions)	Ref.
Film	U.S. release date	U.S. and Canada	Other territories	Worldwide	U.S. and Canada	Worldwide	Budget (millions)	Ref.
Cloudy with a Chance of Meatballs	September 18, 2009	$124,870,275	$118,135,851	$243,006,126	542	688	$100	
Cloudy with a Chance of Meatballs 2	September 27, 2013	$119,793,567	$154,532,382	$274,325,949	569	568	$78	
Total		$244,663,842	$272,668,233	$517,332,075	157	165	$178	

=== Critical response ===
Film	Critical		Public
Film	Rotten Tomatoes	Metacritic	CinemaScore
Cloudy with a Chance of Meatballs	86% (143 reviews)	66 (24 reviews)	A−
Cloudy with a Chance of Meatballs 2	71% (124 reviews)	59 (31 reviews)	A−
