= Cloudy with a Chance of Meatballs (TV series) =

Animated television series (2017–2018)

- Genre: Animated sitcom; Science fiction comedy
- Based on: Cloudy with a Chance of Meatballs by Sony Pictures Animation Cloudy with a Chance of Meatballs by Judi Barrett
- Developed by: Mark Evestaff; Alex Galatis
- Directed by: Jos Humphrey; Steven Garcia; Andrew Duncan; Johnny Darrell
- Voices of: Mark Edwards; Katie Griffin; David Berni; Seán Cullen; Patrick McKenna; Clé Bennett
- Composer: Steffan Andrews
- Countries of origin: Canada; United States
- Original language: English
- No. of seasons: 2
- No. of episodes: 52 (104 segments) (list of episodes)

Production
- Executive producers: Steven DeNure; Ken Faier; Asaph Fipke (season 1); Kirsten Newlands; Josh Scherba; Rick Mischel; Mark Evestaff
- Producer: Lesley Jenner
- Running time: 11 minutes
- Production companies: Corus Entertainment; Sony Pictures Animation; DHX Media

Original release
- Network: YTV (Canada); Cartoon Network and Boomerang (United States, season 1)
- Release: February 20, 2017 – June 30, 2018

Cloudy with a Chance of Meatballs is a animated television series developed by Mark Evestaff and Alex Galatis for Cartoon Network and YTV. It is based on the the film series of the same name, which in turn is based on the children's book of the same name by Judi and Ron Barrett, and is the first television series to be produced by Sony Pictures Animation and was animated using Toon Boom Harmony.

The series premiered in the United States on March 6, 2017 on Cartoon Network, with a sneak peek airing on February 20, 2017. After an unsuccessful run, the show moved to Boomerang's SVOD service, where it debuted on January 11, 2018. In Canada, the series was originally planned to air on Teletoon, but instead premiered on YTV on April 6, 2017. On February 2, 2018, DHX Media announced the series has been renewed for a second season, which premiered on YTV on April 7, 2018. The second season did not air on either Cartoon Network or Boomerang.

== Plot ==
The series is a prequel, featuring the high school years of Flint Lockwood, the eccentric young scientist in the films. In his adventures, he is joined by Sam Sparks, a new girl in town and the school's "wannabe" reporter, along with Flint's dad Tim, Steve the Monkey, Manny as the head of the school's audiovisual club (among other professions), Earl as a school gym teacher, Brent still riding on his fame from the sardine commercial, and Mayor Shelbourne, who serves as the school principal, and who wins every Mayoral election on the pro-sardine platform.

A certain aspect that is contradicted is Flint and Sam's meetup. The episode "And the Winner Is..." clarifies that Flint and Sam met in high school as opposed to their adulthood in the first film. The work-around for this is Flint stating that if Sam ever had to move, he would invent a memory eraser, which would erase any memories of their friendship so she would not be saddened by the loss of another friend (as she and her family frequently move).

== Episodes ==
Season	Episodes		Originally released		
Season	Episodes		First released	Last released	Network
1	52	49	February 20, 2017	December 3, 2017	Cartoon Network (U.S.)
1	52	3	January 11, 2018		Boomerang SVOD (U.S.)
2	52		April 7, 2018	June 30, 2018	YTV (Canada)

== Cast ==
- Mark Edwards as:
  - Flint Lockwood, a struggling inventor who is the titular main protagonist in the show.
  - Steve, Flint's pet vervet monkey who communicates using a Speak and Spell monkey thought translator Flint invented.
- Katie Griffin as Sam Sparks, a weather intern from New York City and a reporter.
- David Berni as "Baby" Brent McHale, an infamous celebrity mascot of Baby Brent's Sardines.
- Seán Cullen as:
  - Tim Lockwood, Flint's widowed father.
  - Susan Shelbourne, the gluttonous and egotistical mayor of Swallow Falls and principal of Cannery High who also holds other higher positions due to the size of Swallow Falls.
  - Old Rick, an elderly citizen in Swallow Falls.
- Patrick McKenna as:
  - Gil, Mayor Shelbourne's neglected son
  - Manny, Sam's Guatemalan cameraman and a former doctor, pilot, and comedian.
- Clé Bennett as Earl Devereaux, the town's athletic police officer/Cannery High teacher and Cal's dad.
- Kim Roberts (uncredited) as Regina, the wife of Earl Devereaux.

== Production ==
Sony Pictures Animation and Canadian family entertainment company DHX Media signed to co-produce the series in 2014, starting with twenty-six 22-minute episodes (fifty-two 11-minute segments). DHX Media handles the global television and non-U.S. home entertainment distribution, along with worldwide merchandising rights, while Sony distributes home entertainment in the United States. Turner Broadcasting System handles international distribution via Cartoon Network. None of the original cast from the films respired their roles for the show and were replaced by Canadian voice actors.

== Broadcast ==
In French, it aired on Télétoon in Canada.

Cloudy with a Chance of Meatballs premiered on Boomerang in Latin America on May 12, 2017 with a broadcast of the first 4 episodes, continuing with recurring releases (double episodes) on Friday. Meanwhile, Cartoon Network premiered the series on May 18, 2017 premiering a new episode every Thursday. In Australia and New Zealand, the series premiered on Cartoon Network on September 2, 2017. In the United Kingdom and Ireland, the series was first broadcast on Cartoon Network on August 28, 2017, starting with the episode "Who You Callin' Garbage?". In France, the series started broadcast on Boing from September 2017; in the same period it started on Cartoon Network in Italy. In India, the series aired on Cartoon Network. The series began broadcasting on Disney Channel in Germany on 6 November 2017. New episodes began premiering on Boomerang's SVOD service in the United States in January 2018. Older episodes of the series are also available on Boomerang. On February 2, 2018, DHX Media announced the series has been picked up for a second season. On November 30, 2018, the show was made available for streaming on Netflix in the United States.

In August 2019, CBS All Access acquired the U.S. broadcast rights to the series, beginning with Season 2.

== Home media ==
Region 1:

- Cloudy with a Chance of Meatballs: Swallow-een Falls Spooktacular! (October 10, 2017)
- Cloudy with a Chance of Meatballs: Lobster Claus is Coming to Town (October 31, 2017)

== Reception ==
=== Critical response ===
Common Sense Media rated the show 3/5 stars stating "Cloudy with a Chance of Meatballs doesn't attempt to lead directly into the movies and in fact presents a major inconsistency for the later stories by introducing Sam to Flint during their teen years. Of course this is only a concern for those who have seen the chronologically later stories first; new viewers without a history with these characters won't have a problem and likely will want to follow up with the movies at some point. A big plus to the show? Even though the science often isn't realistic, the hero and heroine make nerdiness seem pretty cool."

=== Accolades ===
Year	Award	Category	Recipient(s)	Result	Ref.
2018	Saturn Awards	Best Animated Series or Film on Television	Cloudy with a Chance of Meatballs	Nominated	
2019	Canadian Screen Awards	Best Animated Program or Series	Cloudy with a Chance of Meatballs	Nominated	
