= Craig Kellman =

American animator

- Born: Los Gatos, California, U.S.
- Other name: Craig D. Kellman
- Occupations: Animator; character designer; director
- Years active: 1989–present
- Known for: Samurai Jack; The Powerpuff Girls; Madagascar; Hotel Transylvania; Cloudy with a Chance of Meatballs 2 Trolls

Craig Kellman is an American animator, character designer and director. He is best known for his work on Madagascar (2005), Hotel Transylvania (2012), Cloudy with a Chance of Meatballs 2 (2013), Trolls (2016), The Powerpuff Girls and Samurai Jack.

== Background ==
Kellman attended the California Institute of the Arts as a part of their character animation program. At 18, he started work in animation on Bobby's World. He would go on to produce and direct The Twisted Tales of Felix the Cat at 23 and work on major animated series, such as Dexter's Laboratory, The Powerpuff Girls, Foster's Home for Imaginary Friends and HBO's The Ricky Gervais Show.

== Awards and nominations ==
Kellman has received multiple awards and nominations for his works in animation. He has been nominated twice for an Emmy, winning one 2017 for "Outstanding Individual Achievement in Animation" for episode "XCII" of Samurai Jack. Kellman also won an Annie Award for "Outstanding Achievement for Character Design in an Animated Television/Broadcast Production" for his work on the episode "XCVI", as well as one for " Outstanding Achievement in Character Design in an Animated TV/Broadcast Production" for Elf: Buddy's Musical Christmas in 2016.

== Filmography ==
Year	Title	Credit(s)	Notes
1990	Adventures of the Gummi Bears	Layout artist	Uncredited
1990–1995	Bobby's World	Model designer, models, storyboard artist	24 episodes
1991	Adventures in Dinosaur City	Character designer, designer	
1991	A Wish for Wings That Work	Animator	
1992	Bulimiator	Director	
1992–1995	Batman: The Animated Series	Character designer	23 episodes
1993	Bonkers	Character designer	4 episodes
1993	Batman: Mask of the Phantasm	Character designer	
1993–1994	Animaniacs	Model designer	3 episodes
1994	The Ren & Stimpy Show	Storyboard artist	1 episode
1994	The Itsy Bitsy Spider	Storyboard artist	
1994–1995	The Critic	Character designer	22 episodes
1995	Pinky and the Brain	Models	3 episodes
1995–1997	The Twisted Tales of Felix the Cat	Character designer, background artist, layout artist, storyboard artist, director, producer, writer, voice director	12 episodes
1995–1997, 2001–2002	What a Cartoon!	Layout artist, character designer, storyboard artist, animation layout, character layout, art director, production designer	9 episodes
1997	Loose Tooth	Visual development artist	
1997	The Brave Little Toaster to the Rescue	Character designer	Credited as "Craig D. Kellman"
1998	The Brave Little Toaster Goes to Mars	Character design	Credited as "Craig D. Kellman"
1998–1999	Toonsylvania	Layout artist, character layout	8 episodes
1998–2003, 2008	The Powerpuff Girls	Models, art director, character designer	28 episodes
1999	Mickey Mouse Works	Storyboard artist	1 episode
1999	Dexter's Laboratory: Ego Trip	Models, production designer	
2000	Hairballs	Character layout artist, additional animator, director	
2000–2001	Cartoon Cartoon Fridays	Models	5 episodes
2001	The Flintstones: On the Rocks	Character designer	
2001–2017	Samurai Jack	Character designer, property designer	17 episodes
2002	The Powerpuff Girls Movie	Character designer, development	
2002–2003	Dexter's Laboratory	Layout artist	3 episodes
2004	Home on the Range	Additional visual development artist	
2004	The SpongeBob SquarePants Movie	Conception character designer	
2004–2007	Foster's Home for Imaginary Friends	Animation director, character designer, director, creative producer	25 episodes
2005	Madagascar	Lead character designer	
2005	The Madagascar Penguins in a Christmas Caper	Character designer	
2005	HBO First Look	Self	"Madagascar: Welcome to the Jungle" episode
2006	How to Eat Fried Worms	Layout	Via Orphanage Animation Studios
2007	El Tigre: The Adventures of Manny Rivera	Character designer	2 episodes
2007	Bee Movie	Additional character designer	
2007	The Modifyers	Additional character design	Credited as "Craig D. Kellman"
2008	Madagascar: Escape 2 Africa	Character designer	
2008–2010	The Penguins of Madagascar	Character designer	33 episodes
2009	Monsters vs. Aliens	Character design	
2009	The Haunted World of El Superbeasto	Storyboard artist	
2009	SpongeBob SquarePants	Storyboard director	1 episode
2009	Merry Madagascar	Character design	
2009	The Powerpuff Girls: Who, What, Where, How, Why... Who Cares?	Self	Video documentary short
2010	The Ricky Gervais Show	Character designer, director	13 episodes
2010	The Cartoonstitute	Creator, director	“Joey to the World”
2011	McBusters	Voice (judge)	Appeared in "McBusters 3"
2011	The Smurfs: A Christmas Carol	Additional voices	
2012	Hotel Transylvania	Character designer, voice actor	Voice of "Guy in Crowd" and "Hydra"
2012	Madagascar 3: Europe's Most Wanted	Character design	
2013	Madly Madagascar	Character designer	
2013	The Smurfs: The Legend of Smurfy Hollow	Additional voices	
2013	Cloudy with a Chance of Meatballs 2	Character designer, voice actor	Voice of "Flintly McCallahan" and "Idea Pants Guy"
2013	Super Manny	Voice	
2014	Mr. Peabody & Sherman	Character designer	
2014	Penguins of Madagascar	Character designer	
2014	Elf: Buddy's Musical Christmas	Character designer	
2014	Steve's First Bath	Writer	
2015	Hotel Transylvania 2	Character designer	
2015	The SpongeBob SquarePants Movie: Sponge Out of Water	Art department	Designed and supervised Rap Battle Sequence
2016	Sausage Party	Lead character designer	
2016	The Angry Birds Movie	Additional artist	
2016	Ask the StoryBots	Additional character design, writer, developer	6 episodes
2016	Trolls	Character designer	
2017	Puppy!: A Hotel Transylvania Short	Character design	
2018	Hotel Transylvania 3: Summer Vacation	Character designer, voice actor	Voice of "Mr. Hydraberg"
2018	Spider-Man: Into the Spider-Verse	Character design	
2018	A Wizard's Tale	Character designer	
2019	The Addams Family	Character designer	
2019	Spider-Ham: Caught in a Ham	Lead character designer	
2020	The Willoughbys	Character designer	
2021	Monster Pets: A Hotel Transylvania Short Film	Character design	
2021	The Addams Family 2	Designer	
2021	The Loud House Movie	Additional character design	
2022	Hotel Transylvania: Transformania	Character designer	
2022	DC League of Super-Pets	Character designer	
2022	Paws of Fury: The Legend of Hank	Character designer: Mass Animation	
2022	Strange World	Character designer	Uncredited
2023	Ruby Gillman, Teenage Kraken	Character design	
2023	Trolls Band Together	Character design	
