= Cloudy with a Chance of Meatballs (video game) =

2009 video game

- European box art
- Developer: Ubisoft Shanghai
- Publisher: Ubisoft
- Platforms: PlayStation 3 Xbox 360; Wii; Nintendo DS; PlayStation Portable; Microsoft Windows
- Release: EU: September 11, 2009; NA: September 15, 2009 (DS, Wii); NA: September 18, 2009; AU: November 19, 2009
- Genre: Platformer
- Modes: Single-player, Multiplayer

Cloudy with a Chance of Meatballs is a video game tie-in based on the CGI-animated film of the same name which is also based upon the 1978 children's book of the same name. The game allows the player to control Flint Lockwood, the film's hero as he must save his town and the world from the rain of food, fighting highly mutated food enemies and using his gadgets to help him on the way.

== Gameplay ==
While controlling Flint through Swallow Falls (Chewandswallow) you must use six different gadgets to help him proceed through levels. The game has five acts. In the first act each level only allows Flint to use one gadget. Act two allows Flint to switch between two, and act three and up allows Flint to use three in a level. In each level there are 30 Hydronic Foodpods. These have to be disposed of using certain gadgets.

=== Characters ===
- Flint Lockwood --- The playable character and hero of the game, growing up misunderstood by his father because of inventing interests.
- Sam Sparks --- A weather reporter from New York City whom Flint has a crush on. She needs your help in the forest, the Jell-O mold, the Swallow Falls dam and the food-covered town.
- Tim Lockwood --- Flint's father who owns the bait and tackle shop.
- Earl Devereaux --- The police officer of Swallow Falls.
- Cal Devereaux --- Earl's son.
- Baby Brent McHale --- The celebrity mascot of Baby Brent's Sardines.
- Mayor Shelbourne --- The Mayor of Swallow Falls.
- Steve the Monkey --- Flint's best friend who can speak through a thought translator. He is the second players' character for Co-Op gameplay.

== Cast ==
- Eric Artell as Flint Lockwood
- Anndi McAfee as Sam Sparks
- Fred Tatasciore as Tim Lockwood
- Khary Payton as Earl Devereaux
- Phil LaMarr as Cal Devereaux
- Josh Keaton as Baby Brent
- James M. Connor as The Mayor
- Georgina Cordova as Steve the Monkey

== Reception ==
Reception

Aggregate scores
Aggregator	Score					
Aggregator	DS	PC	PS3	PSP	Wii	Xbox 360
GameRankings	50%	53%	66.14%	60%	69.75%	64.18%
Metacritic	50/100	62/100	66/100	60/100	68/100	62/100

Review scores
Publication	Score					
Publication	DS	PC	PS3	PSP	Wii	Xbox 360
GameZone					6.5/10	
IGN	6/10		6.6/10	6/10	6.6/10	6.6/10
Official Xbox Magazine (US)						6.5/10
PC Zone		53%				

The game was met with average to very mixed reception. GameRankings and Metacritic gave it a score of 69.75% and 68 out of 100 for the Wii version; 66.14% and 66 out of 100 for the PlayStation 3 version; 64.18% and 62 out of 100 for the Xbox 360 version; 60% and 60 out of 100 for the PSP version; 53% and 62 out of 100 for the PC version; and 50% and 50 out of 100 for the DS version.
