= Cloudy with a Chance of Meatballs 2 =

2013 animated film by Cody Cameron and Kris Pearn

- Theatrical release poster
- Directed by: Cody Cameron; Kris Pearn
- Screenplay by: Erica Rivinoja; John Francis Daley; Jonathan Goldstein (Note: In some versions of the end credits, Goldstein has his middle initial in his name, while in others his initial is dropped.)
- Story by: Phil Lord; Christopher Miller; Erica Rivinoja
- Based on: Cloudy with a Chance of Meatballs and Pickles to Pittsburgh by Judi Barrett; Ron Barrett
- Produced by: Pam Marsden; Kirk Bodyfelt
- Starring: Bill Hader; Anna Faris; James Caan; Will Forte; Andy Samberg; Benjamin Bratt; Neil Patrick Harris; Terry Crews; Kristen Schaal
- Edited by: Robert Fisher, Jr.
- Music by: Mark Mothersbaugh
- Production companies: Columbia Pictures; Sony Pictures Animation
- Distributed by: Sony Pictures Releasing
- Release date: September 27, 2013
- Running time: 95 minutes
- Country: United States
- Language: English
- Budget: $78 million
- Box office: $274.3 million

Cloudy with a Chance of Meatballs 2 is a 2013 American computer-animated science fiction comedy film directed by Cody Cameron and Kris Pearn and written by Erica Rivinoja, John Francis Daley and Jonathan Goldstein. A sequel to Cloudy with a Chance of Meatballs (2009) and the second and final installment in the franchise, it was produced by Sony Pictures Animation. Bill Hader, Anna Faris, James Caan, Andy Samberg, Benjamin Bratt and Neil Patrick Harris reprise their roles from the first film, with Will Forte in a new role, Terry Crews replacing Mr. T and Kristen Schaal joining the cast. The plot focuses on Flint Lockwood and his friends returning to Swallow Falls when the presumed-destroyed FLDSMDFR resurfaces, this time creating sentient food creatures.

Cloudy with a Chance of Meatballs 2 was released in the United States on September 27, 2013, by Sony Pictures Releasing through its Columbia Pictures label and was a box office success, grossing $274 million worldwide against a budget of $78 million. The film received generally positive reviews from critics, but was deemed inferior to its predecessor.

== Plot ==
Following the food storm incident in Swallow Falls, Chester V, the CEO of Live Corp and Flint Lockwood's childhood idol, offers his company's services to help clean up the island, while temporarily relocating its populace to San Franjose, California. Chester hires Flint to work at Live Corp as he strives to receive a promotion. Six months later, Flint is publicly humiliated when his "Celebrationator" invention is accidentally set off by Steve after the promotion was being given to another employee.

Chester later informs Flint that the FLDSMDFR survived its presumed destruction and now produces sentient food creatures known as "foodimals", many of which attacked his employees stationed on Swallow Falls. Chester tells Flint that he needs to personally travel to the once inhabited island, find the FLDSMDFR and insert a "BS-USB" to shut it down. Flint takes along his pet monkey Steve, his meteorologist girlfriend Sam Sparks, her camera operator Manny, police officer Earl Devereaux, and former Swallow Falls mascot "Chicken" Brent. Flint additionally reluctantly accepts the help of his widowed father Tim, who takes them to the island using his fishing boat. When Chester learns that Flint is not alone, he and his much-abused orangutan assistant Barb gather some of their employees and follow.

While Tim stays on the boat and befriends some living pickles, Flint and his friends work their way through the jungle-like environment of food that now completely covers the island. They encounter many foodimal species, including an innocent living strawberry whom Sam calls "Barry". A Cheespider that previously attacked Chester's employees, chases the group before Chester arrives, scaring it off and joining the mission. Sam becomes suspicious of Chester's motives as his claims about the foodimals being dangerous do not align with her observations. Flint is too afraid of failure to listen, eventually leading Sam and the others to go off on their own. They re-encounter and befriend the Cheespider, discovering that it was only acting hostile towards people wearing Live Corp gear. When the group deduces that the foodimals have realized something sinister about the company, as the "Live" part of its name is simply "evil" spelled backwards, they attempt to warn Flint but are captured by Chester's employees.

Flint, Chester and Barb track down the FLDSMDFR. Flint watches it create sentient marshmallows, who immediately befriend him, and realizes that Sam was right. He defies Chester and refuses to shut down the FLDSMDFR. Chester fights Flint and plugs the BS-USB, now revealed to be a reprogramming device, into the machine himself. With the FLDSMDFR now under his control, Chester pushes Flint into a river and starts capturing more foodimals, planning to use them as ingredients for Live Corp's upcoming line of food bars. The marshmallows rescue Flint and reunite him with Tim and Barry. The Lockwoods realize that, without the FLDSMDFR, the entire island's ecosystem will die out. Flint feels responsible and becomes demoralized, until he discovers that the foodimals, having watched archived footage of the FLDSMDFR's creation, revere him as their creator. Inspired, Flint vows to set things right.

Aided by Tim and the foodimals, Flint and Barry infiltrate the new Live Corp factory under construction on the island; there, they release the captive foodimals, who battle Chester's employees. Flint confronts Chester, who he threatens to make his captive friends into food bars too; Barb is reluctant to participate in this, so Chester dismisses her. Flint sets off his Celebrationator to defeat Chester and free his friends; he attempts to flee with the machine, but is cornered by Flint's group and the foodimals. Having changed sides from becoming fed up with Chester's abuse, Barb steals back the machine, while Chester is eaten by the Cheespider.

The next day, Flint returns the FLDSMDFR to its home base, frees it from Chester's control and reconciles with his friends, allowing Barb to join the group. The FLDSMDFR continues creating foodimals, which coexist peacefully with the islanders.

== Voice cast ==
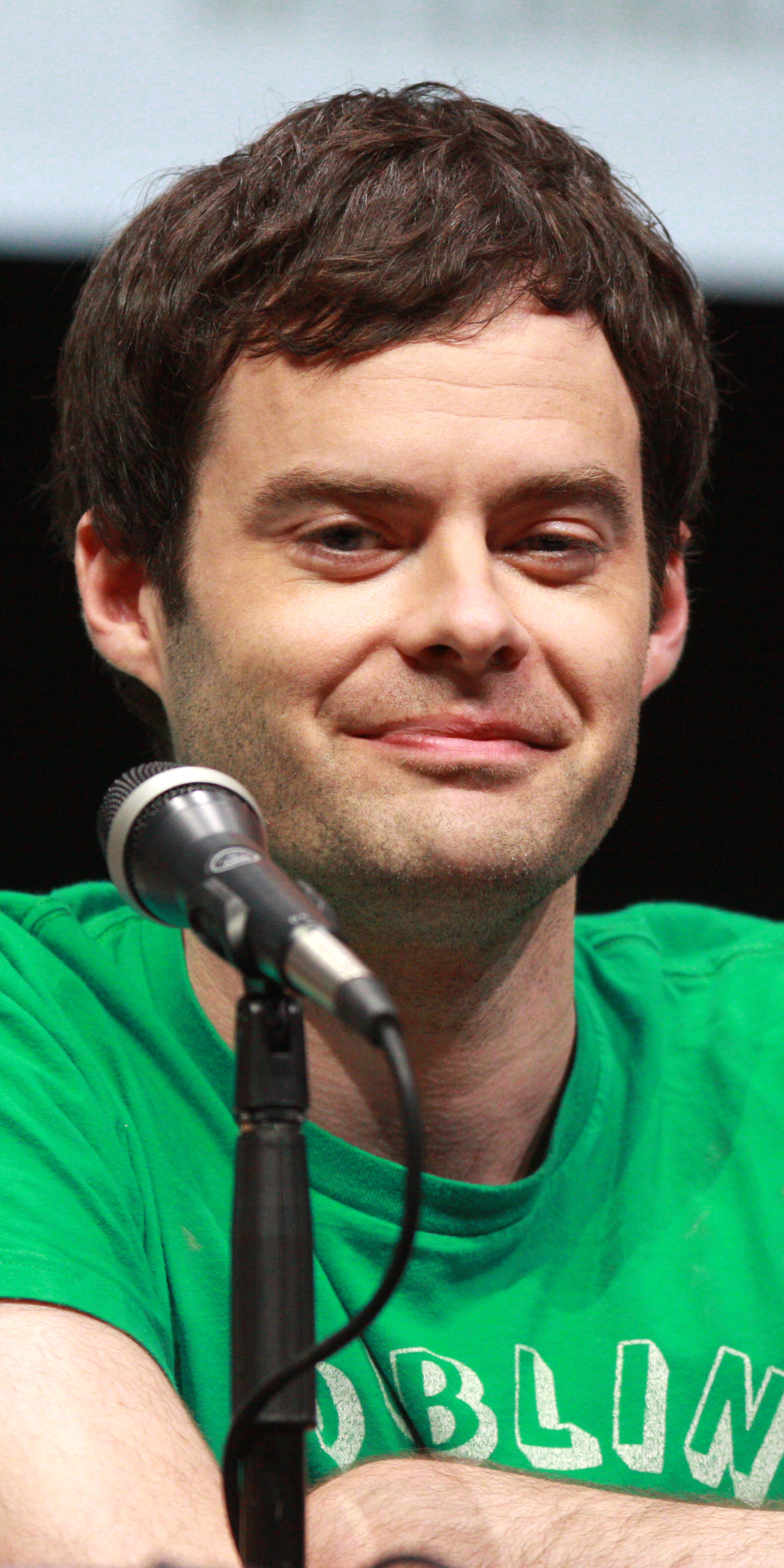
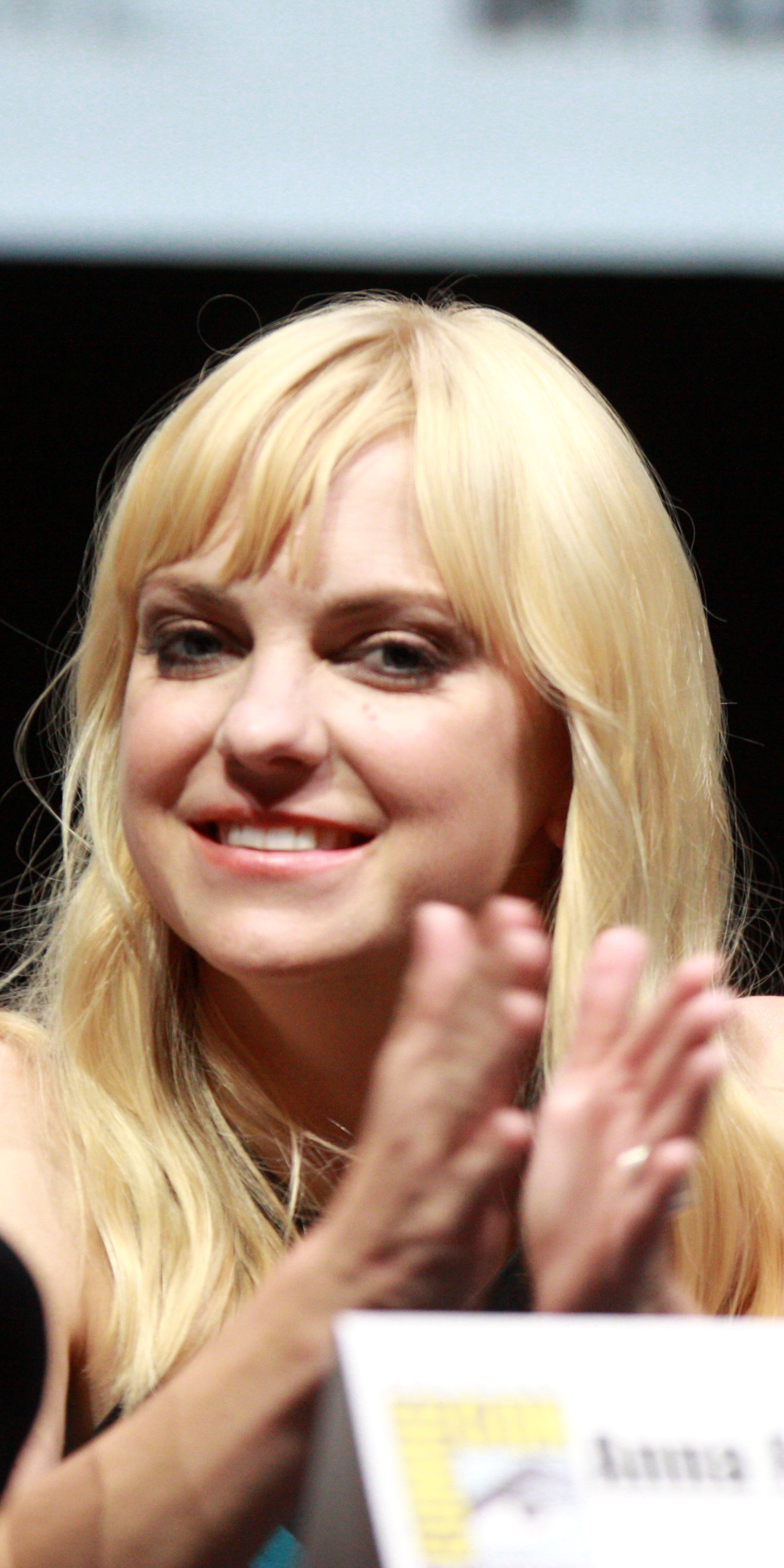
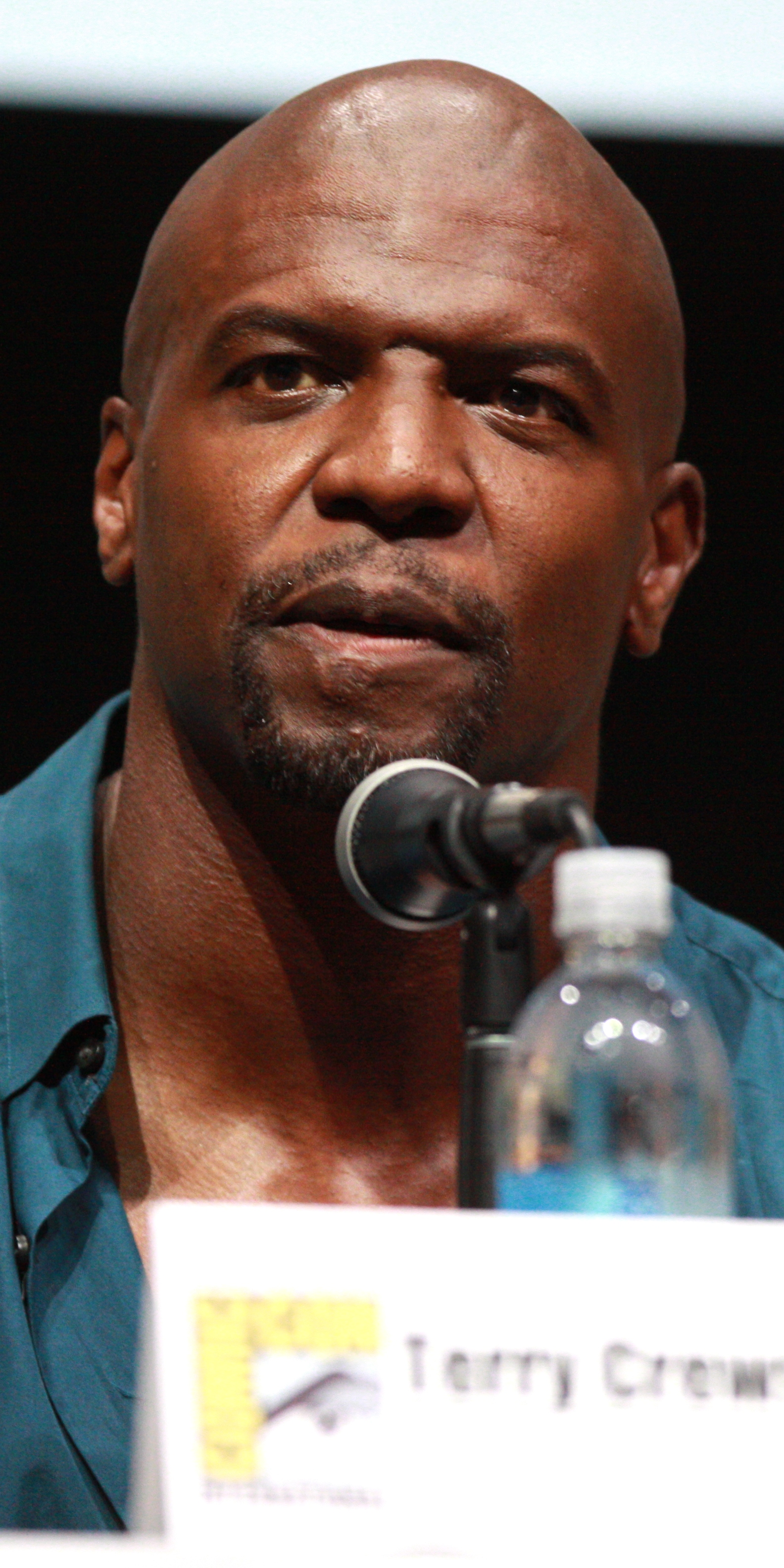
Bill Hader, Anna Faris and Terry Crews at the 2013 San Diego Comic-Con promoting Cloudy with a Chance of Meatballs 2.

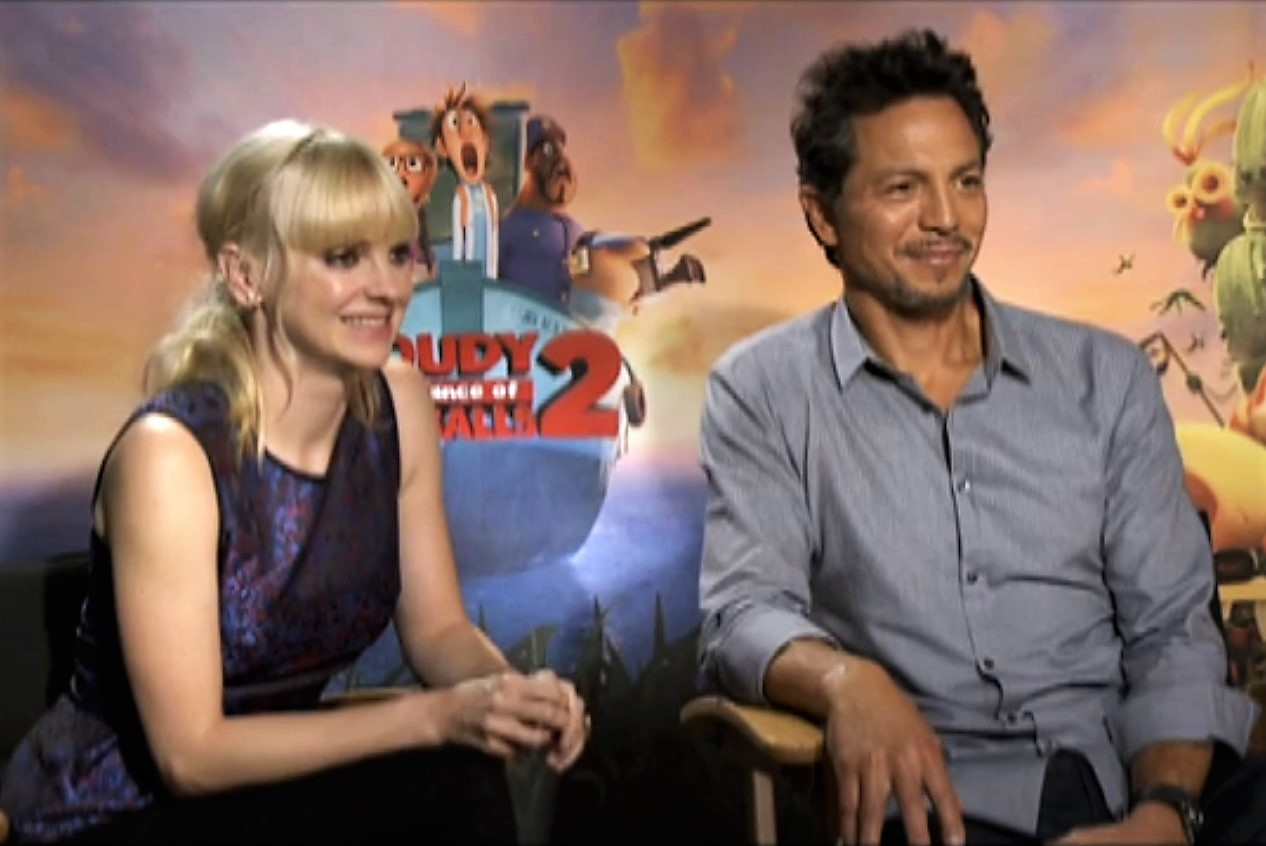
Anna Faris, Benjamin Bratt interviewed about Cloudy with a Chance of Meatballs 2 in 2013

- Bill Hader as:
  - Flint Lockwood, an inventor and Sam's boyfriend.
  - The FLDSMDFR, as he did in the first film.
    - Bridget Hoffman additionally portrayed the former's younger self in the film's prologue. She replaced Max Neuwirth for the role.
      - Archival recordings of Neuwirth as the young Flint are heard in the beginning of the film.
- Anna Faris as Sam Sparks: a weather intern from New York City and Flint's girlfriend.
- Will Forte as Chester V: Flint's childhood idol who is a world-famous super-inventor and the CEO of Live Corp. Forte voiced Joe Towne in the first film.
- James Caan as Tim Lockwood: Flint's widowed fisherman father.
- Andy Samberg as "Chicken" Brent McHale: Flint's former rival and bully and the former mascot of Swallow Falls' sardine cannery.
- Neil Patrick Harris as Steve: Flint's pet vervet monkey who communicates using a thought translator that Flint invented; however, he only has a limited vocabulary and mostly just says his name, says a few random things and reminds Flint that he is hungry. He later becomes Barb's love interest.
- Benjamin Bratt as Manny: Sam's Guatemalan camera operator and a former doctor, pilot and comedian.
- Terry Crews as Earl Devereaux: Swallow Falls' athletic police officer. Crews replaced Mr. T From the first film, Mr. T was asked to reprise the role of Earl for the sequel but he declined to reprise the role so Crews was brought on to replace Mr. T, though the latter's archival recordings are heard in the film's opening.
- Kristen Schaal as Barb: An intelligent Bornean orangutan and Chester's much-abused assistant. She later develops a crush on Steve.
- Cody Cameron as:
  - Barry the Strawberry
  - The Pickles
- Khamani Griffin as Calvin "Cal" Devereaux: Earl's son. Griffin replaced Bobb'e J. Thompson from the first film.
- Al Roker as Patrick Patrickson: the anchorman of Weather News Network.
- Melissa Sturm, Kris Pearn and Craig Kellman as some of Live Corp's employees
  - Kellman additionally portrays Flintly McCallahan: another employee who receives a promotion.

== Production ==
=== Development ===
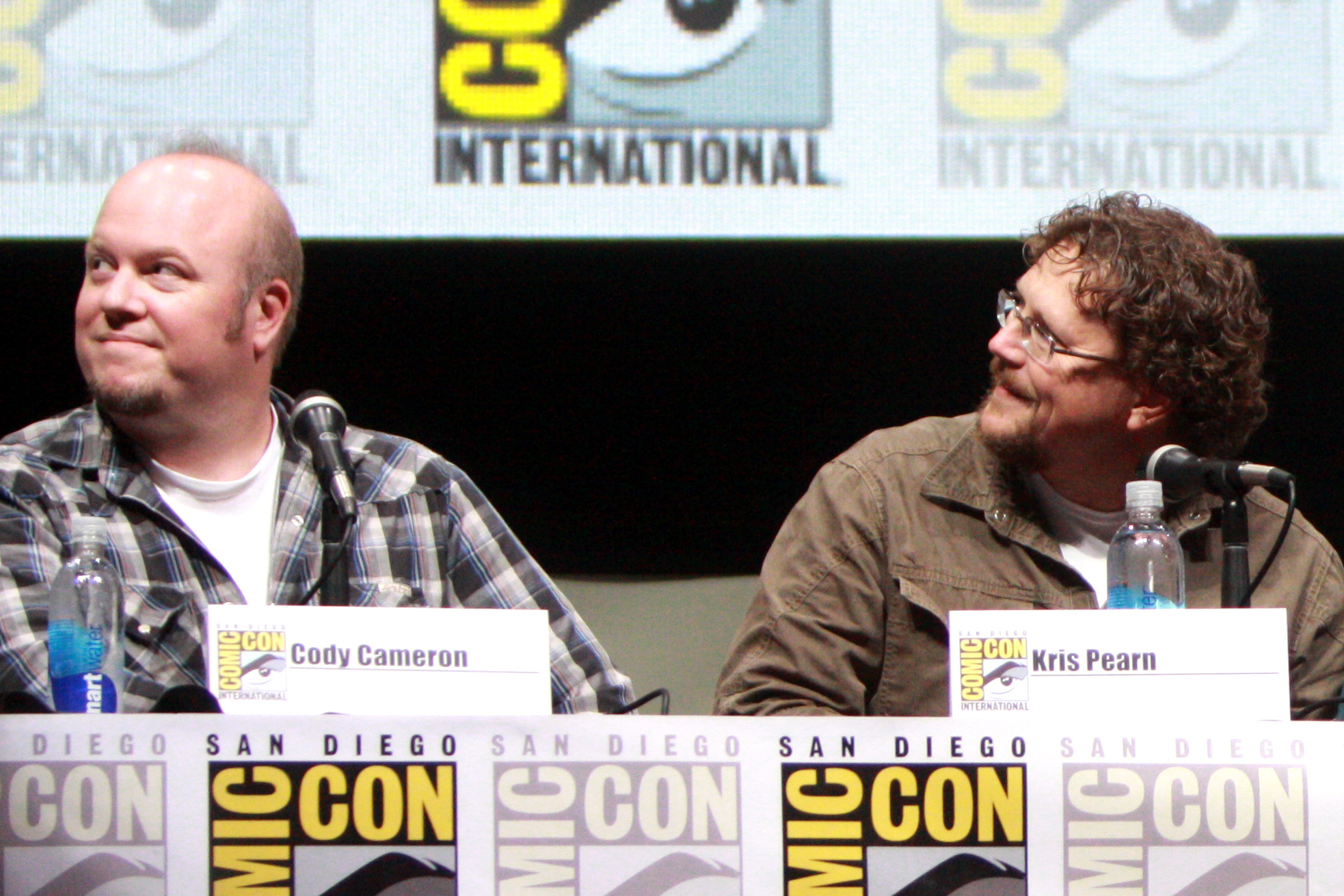
Cody Cameron and Kris Pearn, the directors of the film, at the 2013 San Diego Comic-Con

The sequel was announced on April 12, 2010, when website io9 reported that the original film's directors, Phil Lord and Chris Miller, would not return for the sequel. In December 2011, it was reported that Cody Cameron, one of the story artists on the first film, and Kris Pearn, the head of story on the first, would direct the sequel, with Lord and Miller serving as executive producers. John Francis Daley, Jonathan Goldstein, and Erica Rivinoja wrote the screenplay, which is based on an original story idea, not on Pickles to Pittsburgh, Ron and Judi Barrett's follow-up book. In February 2012, it was announced that the sequel would be titled Cloudy 2: Revenge of the Leftovers, but it was later retitled to Cloudy with a Chance of Meatballs 2.

=== Casting ===
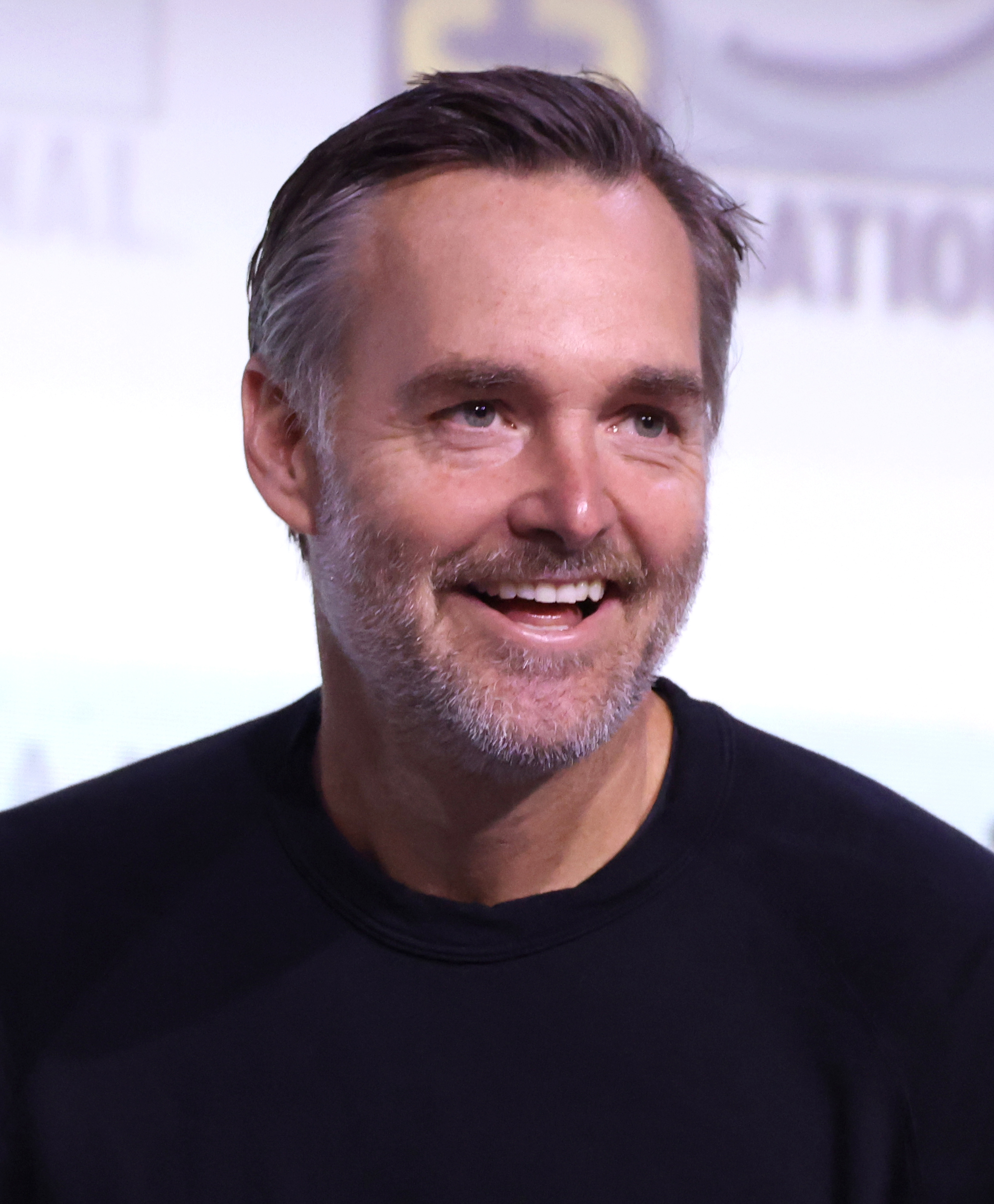
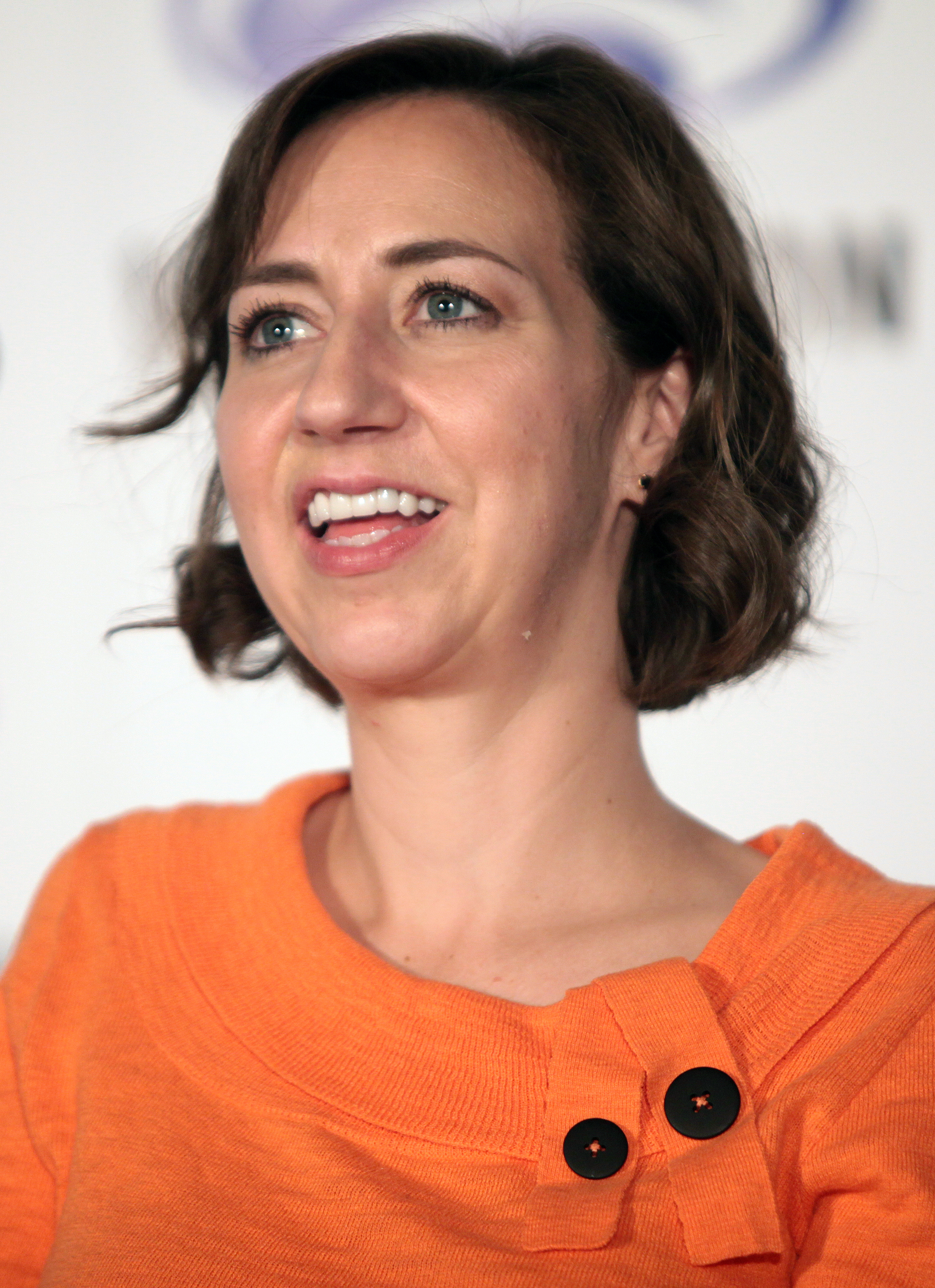
Will Forte (left) and Kristen Schaal (right) Voices Chester V and Barb.

Bill Hader, Anna Faris, James Caan, Andy Samberg, Neil Patrick Harris, and Benjamin Bratt reprised their roles from the first film. Mr. T was asked to reprise the role of Earl Devereaux the athletic cop from the first film but he declined to reprise the role so Terry Crews was brought on to replace Mr. T as Earl. Kristen Schaal joined the cast to voice Barb, a talking and lipstick-wearing orangutan with a human brain. Will Forte, who voiced Joseph Towne in the first film, voices Chester V, a world-famous super-inventor who commands Barb and is the head of the Live Corp Company. On January 17, 2013, concept art from the film was released.

=== Music ===
The music was composed by Mark Mothersbaugh. Cody Simpson provided a single, from his album Surfers Paradise "La Da Dee", which was played at the film's end credits. Simpson also performed in a music video that incorporated footage from the film. Paul McCartney's single, "New", from his 2013 album, was featured in the film.

In the Japanese release, the band TEMPURA KIDZ provides a song "Tabechaitaino" and voices a Marshmallow.

== Release ==
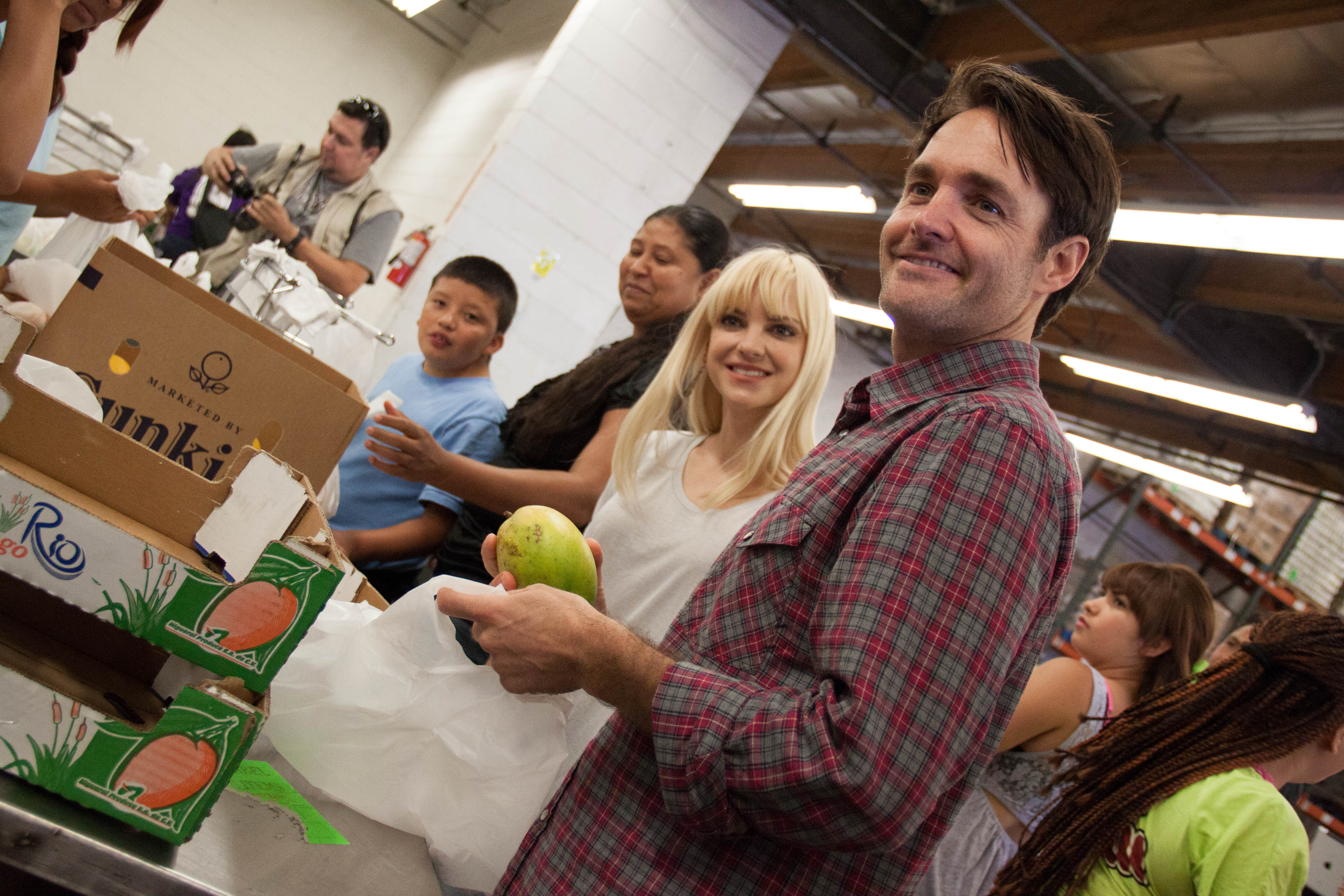
Anna Faris and Will Forte attending a food packing event at the Los Angeles Food Bank

Cloudy with a Chance of Meatballs 2 was initially scheduled for release on December 20, 2013, but was pushed back to February 7, 2014, before it was later moved up to September 27, 2013.

In promotional events before the film's release, Sony Pictures Animation partnered with some produce companies to provide more than 200,000 pounds (91 tonnes) of produce for Feeding America's action to help children and families in need. Several food-packing events across the country were organized, with Anna Faris and Will Forte attending the main one in Los Angeles. Sony teamed up with marketing partners in the United States to promote the film through Subway Kids Meals with a set of 6 customized bags.

=== Home media ===
Cloudy with a Chance of Meatballs 2 was released on DVD and Blu-ray on January 28, 2014. The home media was accompanied by a quartet of animated shorts based on the main feature: Super Manny, Earl Scouts, Steve's First Bath, and Attack of the 50-Foot Gummi Bear. Two of the shorts, Super Manny and Earl Scouts, were already released online before the media release, premiering in October 2013 on Univision and Fandango, respectively. David Feiss directed all four shorts, which feature a computer-generated wraparound animation and a hand-drawn animation, provided by Six Point Harness.

== Reception ==
=== Box office ===
Cloudy with a Chance of Meatballs 2 grossed $119.8 million in North America, and $154.5 million in other countries, for a worldwide total of $274.3 million. Its budget was reported at $78 million.

In North America, the film earned $9.3 million on its opening day, and opened to number one in its first weekend, with $34 million. In its second weekend, the film dropped to number two, grossing an additional $21 million. In its third weekend, the film dropped to number three, grossing $13.8 million. In its fourth weekend, the film dropped to number five, grossing $9.7 million

=== Critical response ===
On review aggregator Rotten Tomatoes, the film has a rating of 71%, based on 122 reviews, with an average rating of 6.4/10. The site's consensus reads: "While not as clever or inventive as its predecessor, Cloudy with a Chance of Meatballs 2 compensates with enough dazzling visuals to keep younger viewers entertained." Metacritic, gave the film a score of 59 out of 100, based on 31 critics, indicating "mixed or average" reviews. Audiences surveyed by CinemaScore gave the film a grade "A−", the same as the first film.

Michael Rechtshaffen of The Hollywood Reporter gave the film a positive review, saying "While not as delightfully breezy as the original, an engaging voice cast and hordes of 'Foodimals' still manage to serve up a tasty sequel." Linda Barnard of the Toronto Star called it "fun, even if it is occasionally so chaotic it tramples the movie's flow like a herd of stampeding Buffaloafs." Michael Phillips of the Chicago Tribune thought it "better in every respect than the original film. It's also more fun than all three Ice Age, Monsters University, Planes, Epic, Despicable Me 2, and though I could go on, I won't." Jordan Hoffman of the New York Daily News gave the film four out of five stars, saying "Cloudy 2 is loud, weird and chaotic—just as kids like it. ... sometimes it's good to have a sugary treat." Dave McGinn of The Globe and Mail felt it "promises more fun and laughs than it delivers, and this meal tastes like too many that have gone before it." Bill Goodykoontz of The Arizona Republic reviewed it as "the rare sequel that takes the spirit of the original and runs with it, coming up with something uniquely good in its own right."

In a lukewarm review, Tim Robey of The Daily Telegraph said "For all its properly surreal mayhem, this flick isn't quite as nimble or emotionally rounded as its predecessor." Sean O'Connell of The Washington Post wrote "Kids will chuckle, for sure. But parents who were pleasantly surprised by the original film's intelligence will miss Lord and Miller's guiding hands, as what once felt so funny now leaves a stale taste." Rafer Guzman of Newsday thought it "relies on the usual noxious recipe for junky kid flicks: loud noise, pop music and poop jokes." Miriam Bale of The New York Times felt it was "sometimes so strange, colorful and wildly cute that it may end up becoming a Yellow Submarine for a new generation." Tom Russo of The Boston Globe gave the film two out of four stars, saying "It's another brightly rendered effort, but, as the title indicates, a lot of the real creativity seems to have been used up the first time around." Mike Clark of USA Today gave the film two and a half stars out of four, saying "There's not a surprise or moment of tension to be found here, but the film is all energy and color that makes the discomfort of 3-D glasses seem worth it."

Jocelyn Noveck of the Associated Press thought the film worked for its audience: "this is a kid movie, and KIDS LOVE PUNS. So they laugh at 'There's a leek in the boat.' And they laugh even more the second time." A. A. Dowd of The A.V. Club gave the film a C, saying "Like too many sequels, this second helping of Meatballs confuses bigger for better, piling on the action but misplacing much of the original's charm." David Hiltbrand of The Philadelphia Inquirer gave the film three out of four stars, saying "This scrumptious sequel follows the same recipe as the 2009 original." Peter Hartlaub of the San Francisco Chronicle called it "a humorous yet unfocused romp, so unwilling to settle on a single theme that hyperactivity medication should be handed out with the 3-D glasses." Matt Patches of Film.com wrote, "The 2009 original separated itself from the Pixar and Dreamworks competition with a joke-first approach. The sequel quadruples the recipe, with gags on top of gags on top of gags in a way only animation could achieve. Like a foodie Jurassic Park conjured up by Tex Avery, Cloudy 2 is a sight to behold … as long as your brain hasn't turned to mush by the halfway point."

Amy Nicholson of The Village Voice compared the franchise to "The Muppets and Pee-wee's Playhouse, kids' shows that ripen as their audience matures." Keith Staskiewicz of Entertainment Weekly called it "charming enough." Steve Davis of The Austin Chronicle gave the film two out of five stars, saying "For both kids and adults, CWCM2 is little more than a vague memory as soon as it's over." Peter Debruge of Variety opined, "the pic's zany tone and manic pace are good for a quick-hit sugar high." Betsy Sharkey of the Los Angeles Times gave the film three and a half stars out of five, saying "Honestly, anyone who can pull off a running joke about leeks that does not make you gag, and is in fact a silly delight, deserves props." Bill Zwecker of the Chicago Sun-Times wrote, "Unlike so many sequels, this fun-filled 3D adventure is sure to entertain younger kids but also charm the adults".

=== Accolades ===
Awards
Award	Category	Recipients	Result
Kids' Choice Awards	Favorite Animated Movie		Nominated
Satellite Awards	Best Motion Picture, Animated or Mixed Media		Nominated
Visual Effects Society Awards	Outstanding Animation in an Animated Feature Motion Picture	Peter Nash, Michael Ford, Chris Juen, Mandy Tankenson	Nominated
Visual Effects Society Awards	Outstanding FX and Simulation Animation in an Animated Feature Motion Picture	Andrew Hofman, Alex Moaveni	Nominated
British Academy Children's Awards	BAFTA Kid's Vote - Film in 2014		Nominated

== Video games ==
A video game titled Cloudy with a Chance of Meatballs 2, published by GameMill Entertainment, was released on September 24, 2013, for Nintendo DS and Nintendo 3DS. Its gameplay mechanic is similar to Fruit Ninja.

A free mobile game titled Cloudy with a Chance of Meatballs 2: Foodimal Frenzy was developed by PlayFirst and released for both iOS and Android devices. The game was removed from the App Store in 2015 and is no longer available to download.

A downloadable app titled Foodimal Funimal was released for free by Sony Pictures Home Entertainment on iOS and Android mobile devices on August 20, 2013.

== Proposed sequel ==
A day after the film's release, Cody Cameron discussed the possibility of a third film, saying "I don't know that will happen, we're going to have to see what it does on September 27th, I definitely think we've set up enough character, basically enough stuff in the second film that we can branch off and do multiple stories for a third film – but you know it's kind of hard to think about that right now."

In September 2023, almost 10 years after the film's release, Phil Lord stated that a script was completed for a third installment before the 2023 Writers Guild of America strike, entitled Planet of the Grapes, which was a direct reference to the recently released film, Kingdom of the Planet of the Apes.
