= Ervine Metzl =

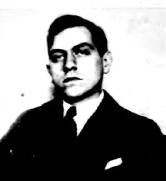
- Ervine Metzl, age 25.
- Born: May 28, 1899; Chicago, Illinois
- Died: November 22, 1963 (aged 64); New York City, New York
- Education: Art Institute of Chicago
- Known for: Poster art, Illustration
- Awards: Benjamin Franklin Award

Ervine Metzl (1899–1963) was an American graphic artist and illustrator best known for his posters and postage stamp designs.

== Biography ==
Ervine Metzl was born in Chicago in 1899 to Ignatz and Bertha (Kohn) Metzl, Jewish immigrants from Bohemia.

As a young man, he attended the School of the Art Institute of Chicago and showed an interest in poster design. In July 1917, in the midst of the First World War his Red Cross poster earned an honorable mention at the Art Institute's Exhibition of Posters for National Service.

He created several posters for a series commissioned by the Chicago Transit Authority in the early 1920s. Metzl's posters, The Evanston Lighthouse by the Elevated Lines and The Field Museum by the Elevated Lines (featuring a toucan) are still reproduced today. A 2004 exhibit in Chicago featured several of Metzl's transit posters, and the Chicago Tribune art critic commented, "The boldest pieces, because they are the simplest in form and most lively in color, are by Ervine Metzl, who apparently began the series in 1921."

The cover of Fortune magazine featured Metzl's depictions of an astronomical observatory and a comet (July 1932) and a window washer (November 1932).

Working in Manhattan, Metzl influenced the lives and careers of other artists, as well. In the 1930s, graphic designer Paul Rand's career was helped along by Metzl, who helped Rand find a position designing advertisements for a Manhattan ad agency. Metzl was also a friend of Ludwig Bemelmans, author of the popular Madeline books. Metzl is variously described as Bemelmans' "agent" and as his "ghost artist". It was in Metzl's studio that Bemelmans is said to have met his future wife, Madeleine "Mimi" Freund, a model. As president of the Society of Illustrators from 1956–1957, Metzl took a young Ron Barrett under his wing. Illustrator Gyo Fujikawa was also a friend of Metzl's.

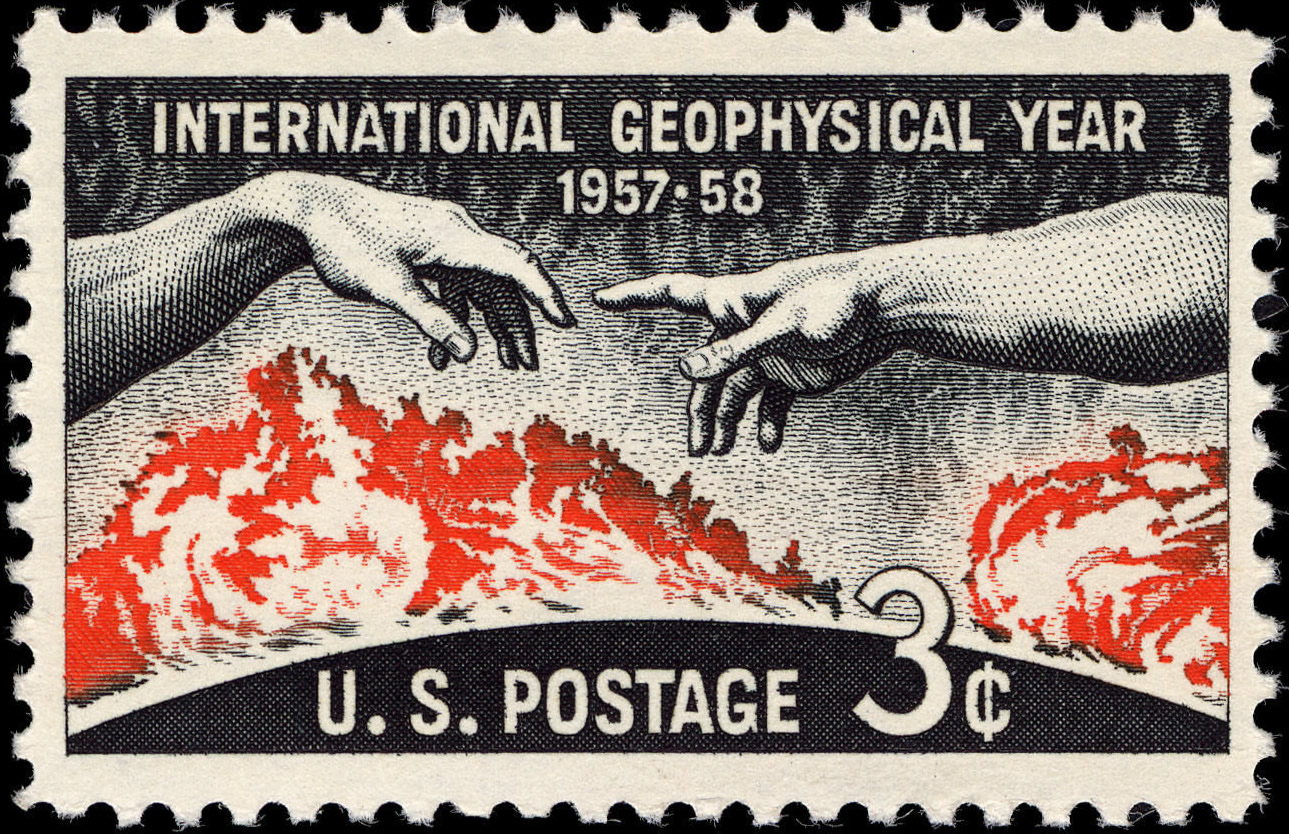
Metzl was well known for his three-cent stamp commemorating the 1957–1958 International Geophysical Year

From 1957-1960, Metzl designed ten postage stamps for the United States Postal Service. One of his best known stamp designs was a commemorative stamp for the first International Geophysical Year in 1957-1958, in which he "endeavored to picture a man’s wonder at the unknown together with his determination to understand it and his need for spiritual inspiration to further his knowledge" by pairing the outstretched arms from Michelangelo's The Creation of Adam with a depiction of a solar flare. He also designed commemoratives for the first World Refugee Year, the Lincoln Sesquicentennial, and the 1960 Winter Olympics.

In addition to his stamp design work, Metzl served on the U.S. Postal Service Citizens' Advisory Committee. In recognition of his contributions, he was one of the inaugural recipients of the Benjamin Franklin Award in 1960.

He wrote The Poster: Its History and Its Art, published by Watson-Guptill Publications shortly before his death.

He also illustrated the Borzoi Chapbook No. 2, Rainbow, poem by Sylvia Townsend Warner (Knopf, New York, 1932).

Metzl died in New York City on November 22, 1963, the day John F. Kennedy was assassinated.
