= List of Cloudy with a Chance of Meatballs episodes =

The following is a list of episodes from the series Cloudy with a Chance of Meatballs.

== Series overview ==
Season	Episodes		Originally released		
Season	Episodes		First released	Last released	Network
1	52	49	February 20, 2017	December 3, 2017	Cartoon Network (U.S.)
1	52	3	January 11, 2018		Boomerang SVOD (U.S.)
2	52		April 7, 2018	June 30, 2018	YTV (Canada)

== Episodes ==
- Two episodes from the first season, "And the Winner Is..." and "Who You Callin' Garbage?" were directed by Steven Garcia and Jos Humphrey, while the rest of the series was directed by Andrew Duncan and Johnny Darrell.

=== Season 1 (2017–18) ===
No.	Title	Written by	Storyboarded by	Original release date	Prod. code	US viewers (millions)
1	"And the Winner Is..."	Alex Galatis and Mark Evestaff	Steven Garcia	February 20, 2017	102a	1.17
Flint and Sam remember when they destroyed the town while competing with each other in the science fair.
2	"Princess Kittymittens"	Mark Edwards	David Wiebe	March 6, 2017	103b	0.81
Flint begs Sam to let him see her most treasured possession, but when Sam relents, Flint damages it and has to find a way to make it up to her.
3	"Invent This!"	Terry McGurrin	Cory Toomey	March 6, 2017	103a	0.88
When Tim is celebrated for accidentally inventing a pencil holder, Flint becomes jealous and starts to doubt his own skills as an inventor.
4	"Bacon Girl"	Josh Saltzman	Steven Garcia	March 6, 2017	101b	0.88
Flint invents a way to make sardines taste like bacon so Sam can eat one without gagging, but Flint's invention has a few bacon-related side-effects.
5	"Who You Callin' Garbage?"	Miles Smith	Steven Garcia	March 7, 2017	101a	0.79
Flint creates an invention to take out the garbage, but it soon starts deciding for itself what and who counts as garbage.
6	"The Ballad of Johnny Sardine"	Alex Galatis and Mark Evestaff	Steven Garcia	March 8, 2017	102b	0.79
Swallow Falls prepares to celebrate the birthday of its oldest sardine, a wish-granting fish named Johnny, but Flint and Sam put the entire event in jeopardy.
7	"Millionaire Monkey"	Mark Edwards	Dennis Crawford	March 9, 2017	104a	0.82
When Steve wins the Swallow Falls lottery, townspeople line up claiming that they are Steve's best friend causing Flint to question Steve's true affections.
8	"Baby Brent Sitter"	Evan Thaler Hickey	Jon Affolter	March 13, 2017	104b	0.77
Flint and Sam baby-sit so they can buy a new board game, but when Brent hires them as his baby sitter they have to decide whether the humiliation is worth the reward.
9	"Spoiler Orb"	Mark Edwards	Jeff Amey	March 14, 2017	105a	0.82
Flint modifies Sam's weather-predicting orb to predict the future, but knowing their future isn't as fun as they thought it would be.
10	"The Pandas Are Coming"	Miles Smith	Ricardo Osuna	March 15, 2017	105b	0.82
Mayor Shelbourne brings a panda to Swallow Falls, but when the town falls under the panda's spell, it's up to Flint and Sam to find out what's really going on.
11	"Inventors Only"	Evan Thaler Hickey	Mike West	March 16, 2017	106a	0.81
Flint is excited to discover there's another inventor in town, but Sam suspects the inventor has an ulterior motive for befriending Flint.
12	"Clock-a-Doodle-Doom"	Miles Smith	Nathan Affolter	March 20, 2017	106b	0.70
To stop himself from being late for school, getting into more trouble, and missing all the fun, Flint decides to create a robo-rooster alarm from getting late for school.
13	"The Sardemon"	Shawn Kalb	Cory Toomey	March 21, 2017	107a	0.62
Tim brings Flint out into the wilderness to participate in a Lockwood father-son tradition: catching the legendary Sardemon, the largest sardine in existence.
14	"Earl or Pearl?"	Laurie Elliott	Jocelan Thiessen	March 22, 2017	108a	0.68
Earl goes undercover as a female student named "Pearl" in order to befriend Sam and find out what Flint's planning to invent next.
15	"Sardinefest"	Laurie Elliott	David Wiebe	March 23, 2017	107b	0.70
Sam is determined to stop Swallow Falls' annual sardine race, which she firmly believes is animal cruelty.
16	"Total Samesies"	Evan Thaler Hickey	Dalton Grant	March 27, 2017	108b	0.68
When they are teased for being too similar, Flint and Sam try to prove that they are totally different.
17	"Monkey Me, Monkey You"	Terry McGurrin	Dennis Crawford	March 28, 2017	109a	0.70
When Flint accidentally combines himself with Steve, he must learn to live with the monkey inside him.
18	"Best Invention Ever!"	Mark Edwards	Jon Affolter	March 29, 2017	109b	0.83
After hearing Flint brag about sleep-inventing the best invention ever, the Mayor sees it as a money-making opportunity.
19	"That's Sal, Folks!"	Betsy Walters	Mike West	March 30, 2017	110a	0.92
In trying to keep Sam from moving away, Flint accidentally animates the town's sardine statue, and it begins spilling the town's secrets.
20	"Cloudy with a Chance of Clouds"	Mark Edwards	Nathan Affolter	April 3, 2017	110b	0.67
Flint gives Sam a Cloud-Maker for the anniversary of their friendship, but Sam's new cloud friend will not leave her side.
21	"The Science of the Toot"	Mark Edwards	Jeff Amey	April 4, 2017	111a	0.76
In a bid to make his classmates consider his idea for a science mural, Flint creates a toot-inducing bean.
22	"Mr. Stressup"	Terry McGurrin	Ricardo Osuna	April 5, 2017	111b	0.82
After being injured by one of Flint's inventions, Tim's doctor wants him to relax, and Flint has just the thing to help.
23	"Virtu-Earl Reality"	Mark Edwards	David Wiebe	April 6, 2017	112a	0.83
After encouraging Mr. Earl to have a day off, Sam and Flint learn he is too bored, and try to make things better for him.
24	"Hair We Go Again" (Note: This episode first aired in Latin America on July 21, 2017.)	Laurie Elliott	Cory Toomey	January 11, 2018 (Boomerang SVOD (United States) )	112b	N/A
Flint invents the hair unbalder when he realises he'll go bald one day, but Tim offers him another point of view by showing him the perks of being bald.
25	"It's About Time" (Note: This episode first aired in Latin America on July 28, 2017.)	Mark Edwards	Desirae Salmark	January 11, 2018 (Boomerang SVOD (United States) )	113a	N/A
Sam and Flint accidentally cryogenically freeze themselves in the town's time capsule, and emerge into a post-apocalyptic future.
26	"Self-Helpie" (Note: This episode first aired in Latin America on July 28, 2017.)	Phil Moorhead	Jocelan Thiessen	January 11, 2018 (Boomerang SVOD (United States) )	113b	N/A
Flint invents a device that will put a good picture of him into the yearbook, but it also puts him in every picture that has ever existed.
27	"Happy Clappy Monkey" (Note: This episode first aired in Latin America on September 8, 2017.)	Terry McGurrin	Dennis Crawford	April 27, 2017 (Canada)	114a	N/A
Steve falls in love with the cymbal-smashing electric monkey Flint brought in to replace Steve while he was on vacation.
28	"Robot Rumble" (Note: This episode first aired in Latin America on September 15, 2017.)	Shawn Kalb	Jon Affolter	April 27, 2017 (Canada)	114b	N/A
Flint enters his fearsome robot into a robot competition, and when it comes face to face with Mayor Shelbourne's robot, the results are explosive.
29	"My Pop Is Tops" (Note: This episode first aired in Latin America on September 22, 2017.)	Phil Moorhead	Nathan Affolter	August 5, 2017 (Canada)	115a	N/A
Flint and Gil argue over who has a better dad, setting off a secret competition pitting Tim and Mayor Shelbourne against each other, in a battle of parental prowess.
30	"Clone Alone" (Note: This episode first aired in Latin America on September 29, 2017.)	Betsy Walters and Mark Evestaff	Mike West	August 5, 2017 (Canada)	115b	N/A
Flint accidentally makes a clone of himself, and is shocked to discover his clone is more popular than he is.
31	"Coat of Harms" (Note: This episode first aired in Latin America on October 6, 2017.)	Seán Cullen	Ricardo Osuna	August 5, 2017 (Canada)	116a	N/A
Sam makes Flint a new tricked-out labcoat to replace his old smelly one, not realising it was a gift from his mom.
32	"Earl of My Dreams" (Note: This episode first aired in Latin America on October 13, 2017.)	Phil Moorhead	Jeff Amey	August 6, 2017 (Canada)	116b	N/A
When Flint gets Earl in trouble with his wife, Earl demands Flint help him get back into her good graces.
33	"Spacy Race" (Note: This episode first aired in Latin America on October 20, 2017.)	Mark Edwards	Dave Wiebe	August 12, 2017 (Canada)	117a	N/A
Flint builds a spaceship for an Australian businessman, Mr. Zorbleck, who may or may not actually be Australian.
34	"Tim and Jim" (Note: This episode will be first aired in the United Kingdom on March 8, 2018.)	David Berni	Cory Toomey	August 12, 2017 (Canada)	117b	N/A
Tim's brother, Jim, comes to visit.
35	"Mayornormal Activity"	Betsy Walters	Pierre Comtois	August 13, 2017 (Canada); October 29, 2017 (Cartoon Network (United States) )	118a	0.84
Mayor Shelbourne buys up all the town's candy at Halloween and promises to give it all to the kid who makes it through his super scary haunted house.
36	"Flintenstein"	Mark Edwards	Desirae Salmark	August 13, 2017 (Canada); October 29, 2017 (Cartoon Network (United States) )	118b	0.84
While attempting to debunk Hollywood pseudoscience, Flint accidentally creates his own Frankenstein-like monster.
37	"Ratbirds and Cheesyworms"	Shawn Kalb	Jon Affolter	August 19, 2017 (Canada)	119a	N/A
Flint shares his tale of how he invented Ratbirds.
38	"Junk in the Trunk"	Miles Smith	Dennis Crawford	August 19, 2017 (Canada)	119b	N/A
Flint is made a tempting offer when he sells his inventions at a yard sale.
39	"The Inventor's Code"	Laurie Elliott	Nathan Affolter	August 20, 2017 (Canada)	120a	N/A
Flint feels obligated to help out another inventor in town.
40	"Baby-Baby Brent"	Betsy Walters and Mark Evestaff	Sidne Marat	August 20, 2017 (Canada)	120b	N/A
Brent is furious when Flint and Sam expose that he is no longer a baby.
41	"The Talented Mr. Buttons"	Betsy Walters and Mark Evestaff	Sherann Johnson	August 26, 2017 (Canada)	121a	N/A
Flint and Sam find a lost cat, and Sam sabotages efforts to find the owner so she can keep it.
42	"The Girl Who Cried Meteor"	Phil Moorhead	Ricardo Osuna	August 26, 2017 (Canada)	121b	N/A
When Sam predicts that a meteoroid will crash into Swallow Falls, she and Flint have to find a way to move the island out of its way.
43	"I Gotta Piñata"	Carly DeNure	Cory Toomey	August 27, 2017 (Canada)	122a	N/A
Flint decides to have some fun when he is in charge of a birthday piñata.
44	"Your Fish Is My Command"	Sean Cullen	David Wiebe	August 27, 2017 (Canada)	122b	N/A
Flint is fooled into creating a fish-cyborg army for Mayor Shelbourne.
45	"So I Married a Watermelon"	Mark Edwards	Pierre Comtois	September 19, 2017 (Canada)	123a	N/A
Flint tries to get his father to eat healthier by inventing a spray to make Tim love fruits and vegetables.
46	"The Shelbourne Identity"	Mark Edwards	Desirae Salmark	September 19, 2017 (Canada)	123b	N/A
Sam discovers and spills the beans that the Mayor's first name is Tootsie.
47	"Appreciate This!"	Stephen Senders	Dennis Crawford	September 20, 2017 (Canada)	124a	N/A
Frustrated that the town doesn't appreciate the beauty around them, Sam makes Flint invent something to force them to do so.
48	"She's a Shoe-In"	Bryn Pottie	Solomon Fong	September 20, 2017 (Canada)	124b	N/A
Flint asks Sam to train him for the annual father/son horseshoe contest, which uncovers Sam's troubled past with the sport.
49	"Lobster Claus Is Coming to Town"	Mark Evestaff and Betsy Walters	Jon Affolter	September 21, 2017 (Canada); December 3, 2017 (Cartoon Network (United States) )	125a	N/A
50	"Lobster Claus Is Coming to Town"	Mark Evestaff and Betsy Walters	Nathan Affolter	September 21, 2017 (Canada); December 3, 2017 (Cartoon Network (United States) )	125b	N/A
Flint introduces Sam to Swallow Falls' unique Christmas traditions, centered around the mythical Lobster Claus.
51	"When I Was Your Age"	Betsy Walters	Sidne Marat	September 22, 2017 (Canada)	126a	N/A
Flint invents a time machine to make his father like desserts.
52	"Flint's Biggest Flup"	Betsy Walters	Ricardo Osuna	September 22, 2017 (Canada)	126b	N/A
Flint and Sam move to the other side of the island to take up an inventing-free life. Note: This episode was Sony Pictures Animation's first production to be about the end of the universe, since in the end of the episode, Flint creates a Vacuum Factory to combine thistles and sardines into one, but he forgot to create an off switch, which ends up sucking the island, Earth, the Moon, the Solar System, and galaxies, and everything else.

=== Season 2 (2018) ===
No. overall	No. in season	Title	Written by	Storyboarded by	Original air date (Canada)	Prod. code
53	1	"Einstein's Moustache"	Kurt Smeaton	John Young	April 7, 2018	201a
Gil finds one of Flint's most prized possessions, Albert Einstein's moustache, and he starts wearing it around town.
54	2	"Power Struggle"	Phil Moorhead	Solomon Fong	April 7, 2018	201b
When Flint's inventing makes the power bills skyrocket, Tim takes the Lockwood house off the grid.
55	3	"Brentonium"	Betsy Walters	Sidne Marat	April 7, 2018	202a
Flint helps Brent with his science project, inadvertently inventing a cool new element in the process.
56	4	"Penguipocalypse"	Kurt Smeaton	Andrew Murray	April 7, 2018	202b
Sam receives a pet penguin from her Pet of the Month Club.
57	5	"Dance Fish Move Dance"	Mark Edwards	Jocelan Thiessen	April 14, 2018	203a
Mayor Shelbourne suffers a crisis of leadership when Flint beats his high score on the arcade's most difficult game.
58	6	"Sonny with a Chance of Disappointment"	Phil Moorhead	Basel Abdoullah	April 14, 2018	203b
When Flint totals Tim's boat, he uses a ray to make his dad forget about the crash.
59	7	"Sam's Imaginary Friend"	Mark Edwards	Sherann Johnson	April 14, 2018	204a
Flint invents a machine to bring Sam's imaginary friend into the real world.
60	8	"Hands Up"	Bryn Pottie	Ricardo Osuna	April 14, 2018	204b
Flint realizes that all of the world's great inventors have large hands, so he invents a way to supersize his own mitts.
61	9	"Brent Hog Day"	Betsy Walters	Nathan Affolter	April 21, 2018	205a
During Swallow Falls' annual Brent Hog Day festivities, Sam sets out to reveal that the beloved celebration is a scam.
62	10	"Baby Talk"	Mark Edwards	David Dick	April 21, 2018	205b
When Flint creates an invention to make Earl believe his son, Cal, can talk, Earl goes overboard showing off his genius baby.
63	11	"Now You See Him"	Bryn Pottie	Dennis Crawford	April 21, 2018	206a
When Mayor Shelbourne incorrectly believes Flint's invention has made him invisible, he lives out his dream and goes on a tear through the town.
64	12	"Major Science"	Phil Moorhead	Pierre Comtois	April 21, 2018	206b
Desperate to make science interesting to his peers, Flint creates the superhero alter ego "Major Science."
65	13	"Something Fishy"	Mark Edwards	Desirae Salmark	April 28, 2018	207a
While trying out an invention to help his dad learn to swim, Flint accidentally turns Tim into a fish.
66	14	"Out to FLUNCH"	Betsy Walters	Solomon Fong	April 28, 2018	207b
When Shelbourne confiscates Flint's beloved new invention, Sam organizes a heist to get it back.
67	15	"The Kid's Got Moxy"	Craig Brown	Sidne Marat	April 28, 2018	208a
When Flint's new invention gives Gil some much-needed confidence, the mayor demands a moxy-boost of his own.
68	16	"The New, New Girl"	Kurt Smeaton	Andrew Murray	April 28, 2018	208b
Sam tries to help a new student settle into Swallow Falls.
69	17	"Stormwave and Thunderhawk"	Kurt Smeaton	Jeff Amey	May 5, 2018	209a
When Sam decides she wants a cool nickname, she and Flint struggle to jump through the hoops required to earn it.
70	18	"Squirrels Just Wanna Have Fun"	Kurt Smeaton	Basel Abdoullah	May 5, 2018	209b
Brent offers to rid Flint's lab of a squirrel infestation.
71	19	"Sardine: The Movie"	Mark Edwards	Sherann Johnson	May 5, 2018	210a
Flint and Sam enter Brent's dreams to determine the source of Brent's sudden fear of sardines.
72	20	"The Boy Who Cried Robot"	Betsy Walters	Ricardo Osuna	May 5, 2018	210b
Flint suspects that Shelbourne may be a robot.
73	21	"Fizzy Fish"	Betsy Walters	Nathan Affolter	May 12, 2018	211a
When the Fizzy Fish soda corporation takes over Cannery High, Flint and Sam take their protest right to the top.
74	22	"FLUBER"	Craig Brown	Dave Weibe	May 12, 2018	211b
Flint revolutionizes transportation in Swallow Falls by harnessing the power of ratbirds.
75	23	"Timmy Rockgood"	Seán Cullen	Megan Willis	May 12, 2018	212a
When Tim brushes off his guitar and revitalizes his classic rock act, Flint attempts to modernize his dad's outdated sound.
76	24	"Swallow Fails"	Shawn Kalb	Pierre Comtois	May 12, 2018	212b
Tired of being the butt of the world's jokes, Swallow Falls comes together to try to show how great their island really is.
77	25	"Poppa Piglet"	Kurt Smeaton	Desirae Salmark	May 19, 2018	213a
When Mayor Shelbourne throws out Gil's favorite Poppa Piglet toys, Gil leaves home and moves in with Flint.
78	26	"Mascot Wars"	Kurt Smeaton	Solomon Fong	May 19, 2018	213b
Flint dons a worm suit to try and drum up business for his dad's bait shop.
79	27	"Sardinasaurus"	Carly DeNure	Sidne Marat	May 19, 2018	214a
Flint tries to make up for missing Sam's birthday, but she's too busy tracking a big news story to notice.
80	28	"Flint vs. Flint"	Mark Edwards	Andrew Murray	May 19, 2018	214b
Flint's creation of an AI alter ego backfires when his computerized self starts taking over the real Flint's life.
81	29	"An Alluring Promise"	Craig Brown	Jocelan Thiessen	May 26, 2018	215a
Flint invents a device to help his father end his fishing dry spell, but the special lure ends up attracting people instead of sardines.
82	30	"Brent Bro"	Kurt Smeaton	Krista Porter	May 26, 2018	215b
When Flint and Brent suspect their parents are dating, Brent takes Flint under his wing.
83	31	"Sardinee Babies"	Craig Brown	Sherann Johnson	May 26, 2018	216a
When a local fast food joint starts including Sardinee Babies in their meals, Sam and Flint compete to collect all 37.
84	32	"Party Tron"	Scott Montgomery	Cory Toomey	May 26, 2018	216b
Sam pretends to be Flint's new robot, but finds herself in peril.
85	33	"The Happy Sardine"	Shawn Kalb	Nathan Affolter	June 2, 2018	217a
When Flint's day at the beach goes sour, his dad encourages him to adopt a new 'Say Yes' attitude.
86	34	"Less Ordinary People"	Scott Montgomery	Ricardo Osuna	June 2, 2018	217b
After destroying the town yet again, Flint does his best to be an ordinary teenager.
87	35	"Flint TV"	Betsy Walters	Megan Willis	June 2, 2018	218a
Flint's new invention transports the user into any TV show they choose.
88	36	"Spa Daze"	Craig Brown	Pierre Comtois	June 2, 2018	218b
Hector tricks Flint into helping him win a spot on the Shelbourne Walk of Fame, endangering the whole town in the process.
89	37	"Mayor or Mayor Not"	Betsy Walters	Desirae Salmark	June 9, 2018	219a
Tired of Shelbourne's greedy taxes, Flint convinces his father to run for mayor.
90	38	"Fisherman Sam"	Kurt Smeaton	Solomon Fong	June 9, 2018	219b
Sam starts hanging out with a gang of gruff fishermen to get to the bottom of their uncanny ability to predict the weather.
91	39	"Trees Company"	Amanda Brooke Perrin	Sidne Marat	June 9, 2018	220a
Brent and Flint get stuck up a tree together after one of Brent's jokes goes too far.
92	40	"Tim, Jim and Kim"	Mark Edwards	Andrew Murray	June 9, 2018	220b
Tensions arise when Tim's jealous brother Jim visits with his flirtatious new fiancée, Kim.
93	41	"Live and Let Diary"	Mark Edwards	Jocelan Thiessen	June 16, 2018	221a
Flint, desperate to find out what Sam's giving him for his birthday, invents a device to read her diary out loud.
94	42	"Rainbow Tim"	Kurt Smeaton	Krista Porter	June 16, 2018	221b
When Flint discovers his father only sees shades of grey, he sets out to blow Tim's mind with a device that lets him see color.
95	43	"Mermaid You Look"	Kurt Smeaton	Cory Toomey	June 16, 2018	222a
Tim discovers a mermaid in the ocean, but skeptical Flint doesn't believe they exist.
96	44	"Mrs. Tinklebottom"	Andrew De Angelis	Sherann Johnson	June 16, 2018	222b
Mr. Earl thinks of himself as the healthiest person in Swallow Falls, but he's hiding a delicious, frosting-topped secret.
97	45	"When There's a Gil There's a Way"	Carly DeNure	Nathan Affolter	June 23, 2018	223a
Gil takes over as principal and, much to his dad's surprise, actually improves the school.
98	46	"Embarrass Brent"	Kurt Smeaton	Bram Cayne	June 23, 2018	223b
Nothing embarrasses Brent, until he tries out Flint's new self-awareness-creating invention and becomes horrified by his boorish ways.
99	47	"Flint Land"	Betsy Walters	Pierre Comtois	June 23, 2018	224a
Flint thinks his new series of interactive science exhibits is truly making a difference, but he's actually just created a bunch of carnival rides.
100	48	"Your Dad is My Dad"	Betsy Walters	Desirae Salmark	June 23, 2018	224b
Flint gets jealous when Tim takes Brent (and a growing group of townsfolk) under his fatherly wing.
101	49	"Totally Tall Tales"	Mark Edwards	Solomon Fong	June 30, 2018	225a
Townspeople recount their versions of how the island of Swallow Falls came to be.
102	50	"Flint's Fabulous Future"	Mark Edwards	Steve Garcia	June 30, 2018	225b
Flint creates a machine that predicts a person's future occupation, and is surprised by his own result.
103	51	"Have Yourself a Sardiney Little Christmas"	Scott Montgomery	Sidne Marat and Andrew Murray	June 30, 2018	226
104	52	"Have Yourself a Sardiney Little Christmas"	Scott Montgomery	Sidne Marat and Andrew Murray	June 30, 2018	226
Sam discovers that Santa Claus is vacationing in Swallow Falls and drags Flint along to pitch their Christmas ideas to the jolly old elf.
