= Cloudy with a Chance of Meatballs (film) =

2009 Sony Pictures Animation film

- Theatrical release poster
- Directed by: Phil Lord; Christopher Miller
- Screenplay by: Phil Lord; Christopher Miller
- Based on: Cloudy with a Chance of Meatballs by: Judi Barrett; Ron Barrett
- Produced by: Pam Marsden
- Starring: Bill Hader; Anna Faris; James Caan; Andy Samberg; Bruce Campbell; Mr. T; Bobb'e J. Thompson; Benjamin Bratt; Neil Patrick Harris; Al Roker; Lauren Graham; Will Forte
- Edited by: Robert Fisher Jr.
- Music by: Mark Mothersbaugh
- Production companies: Columbia Pictures; Sony Pictures Animation
- Distributed by: Sony Pictures Releasing
- Release dates: September 12, 2009 (Mann Village Theatre); September 18, 2009 (United States)
- Running time: 90 minutes
- Country: United States
- Language: English
- Budget: $100 million
- Box office: $243 million

Cloudy with a Chance of Meatballs is a 2009 American animated science-fiction comedy film written and directed by Phil Lord and Christopher Miller and loosely based on the children's book of the same name by Judi and Ron Barrett. Produced by Columbia Pictures and Sony Pictures Animation and released by Sony Pictures Releasing, it stars the voices of Bill Hader, Anna Faris, James Caan, Andy Samberg, Bruce Campbell, Mr. T, Benjamin Bratt and Neil Patrick Harris. The film centers around an aspiring inventor named Flint Lockwood (Hader) who, following a series of failed experiments, develops a machine that can convert water into food. When the machine malfunctions, Flint must stop it in order to save the world.

The film marked Lord and Miller's feature film directorial debut. Cloudy with a Chance of Meatballs premiered at the Mann Village Theater in Los Angeles on September 12, 2009 and was released in the United States on September 18. It was a box office success, grossing $243 million against a budget of $100 million. The film received positive reviews from critics and was nominated for Best Animated Feature at the 67th Golden Globe Awards. A sequel, Cloudy with a Chance of Meatballs 2, was released in 2013, while an animated television series premiered in 2017.

== Plot ==
Aspiring, yet struggling scientist and inventor Flint Lockwood lives with his widowed fisherman father Tim in Swallow Falls, an island in the Atlantic Ocean where its economy is entirely based on sardine sales, which have plummeted due to the rest of the world deeming sardines “super gross”, forcing the townsfolk to eat all the sardines themselves. Flint plans to expand the town's diet by inventing the "Flint Lockwood Diatonic Super Mutating Dynamic Food Replicator" (FLDSMDFR), a machine that turns water vapor into food via "genetic mutation". During his first test, he accidentally knocks down the power, annoying his father in the process.

When Flint tries to connect the machine to a local substation, the machine overloads, rocketing across town and into the sky. In the process, it accidentally destroys Sardine Land, an amusement park meant to revitalize the island's economy, upsetting the townsfolk. Soon afterwards, a dejected Flint heads to the harbor where he meets Samantha "Sam" Sparks, a meteorologist intern from New York City whose big break was thwarted by the accident. As she and Flint interact, cheeseburgers begin raining from the sky; Flint realizes that the FLDSMDFR is now functioning in the stratosphere, using the condensation from clouds to create food-based weather systems.

Swallow Falls is renamed to Chewandswallow and becomes a food tourism destination, making Flint a popular celebrity; he and Sam simultaneously fall in love inside a Jello dome. Meanwhile, Tim draws Flint's attention to the fact that the food has begun to "over-mutate", becoming larger and less molecularly stable. Flint warns the now-morbidly obese Mayor Shelbourne that the machine is beginning to malfunction, but he remains unconcerned but yet ignorant. As a spaghetti-made tornado wreaks havoc in the town, Flint attempts to deactivate the machine, but the mayor inadvertently destroys the control panel in an attempt to stop him, causing the FLDSMDFR to become rogue and create a massive food storm across the globe.

After some encouragement from Tim, Flint places a kill code in a USB drive and redesigns his flying car to reach and shut down the machine. Accompanied by his monkey Steve, Sam, her cameraman Manny and "Baby" Brent, they approach the stratosphere and discover that the FLDSMDFR has surrounded itself with a giant meatball-like shell for protection and is now producing sentient food. As they reach the interior, the drive is lost, prompting Flint to instruct Tim to send the kill code to his phone while Earl and the townsfolk evacuate the island on food-made boats. As Flint and Sam made their way further toward the machine’s location, an accidental contact with some peanut brittle triggers the latter’s peanut allergies but she refuses to leave Flint, and confesses their love for one another, but Flint breaks the licorice rope in order to save her, thus forcing the latter to retreat with Brent while he continues alone.

Finding the FLDSMDFR, which now evolved a mind of its own, Flint attempts to use the kill code, only to discover that Tim sent the incorrect file. All is lost until Flint uses his "Spray-on Shoes" formula to jam the machine before falling down to earth, causing the giant meatball to detonate. The townsfolk praise Flint as a hero, Tim shows appreciation for his son and he and Sam profess their love for each other. Meanwhile, the mayor becomes lost at sea after eating his own boat.

== Voice cast ==
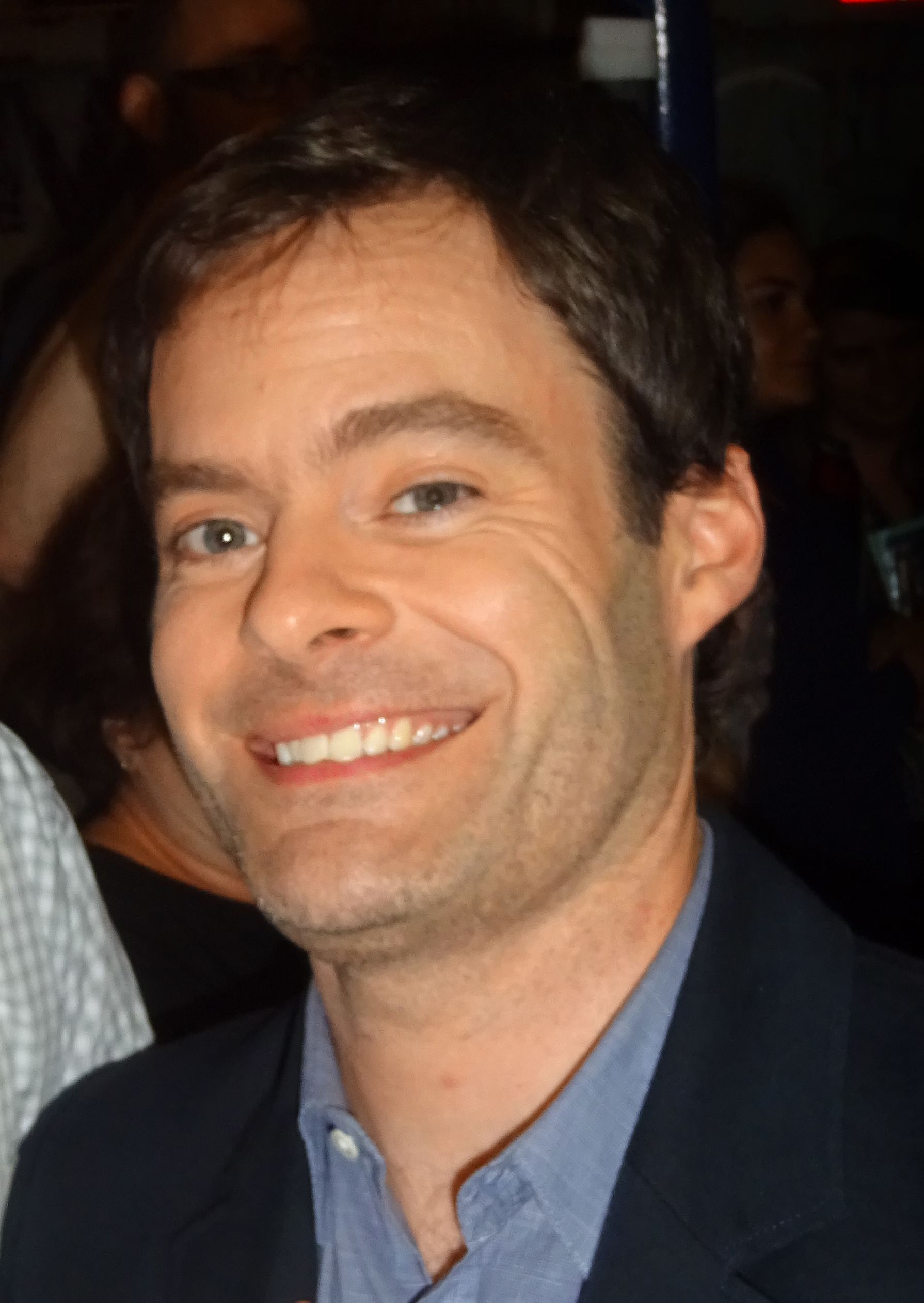
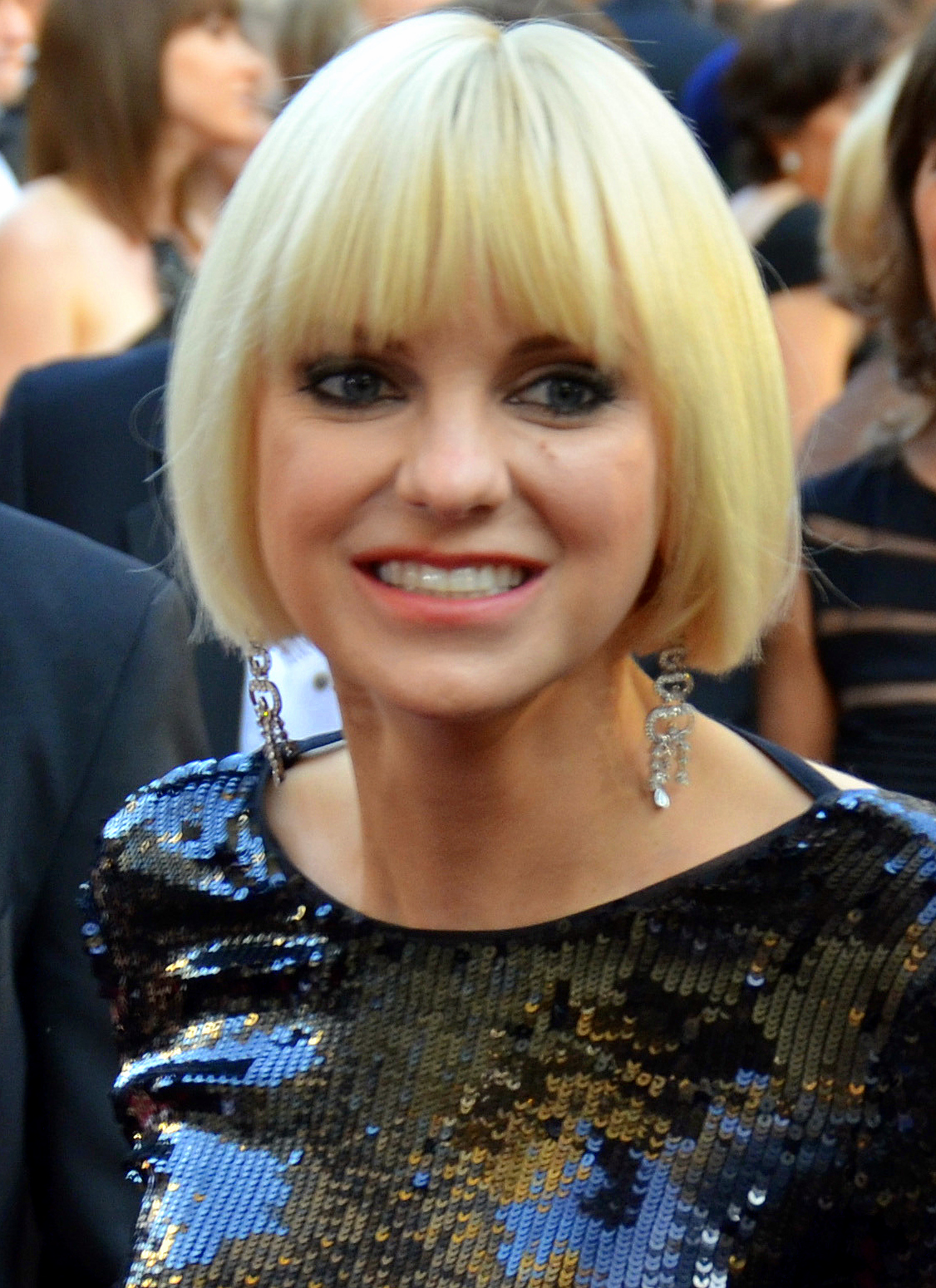
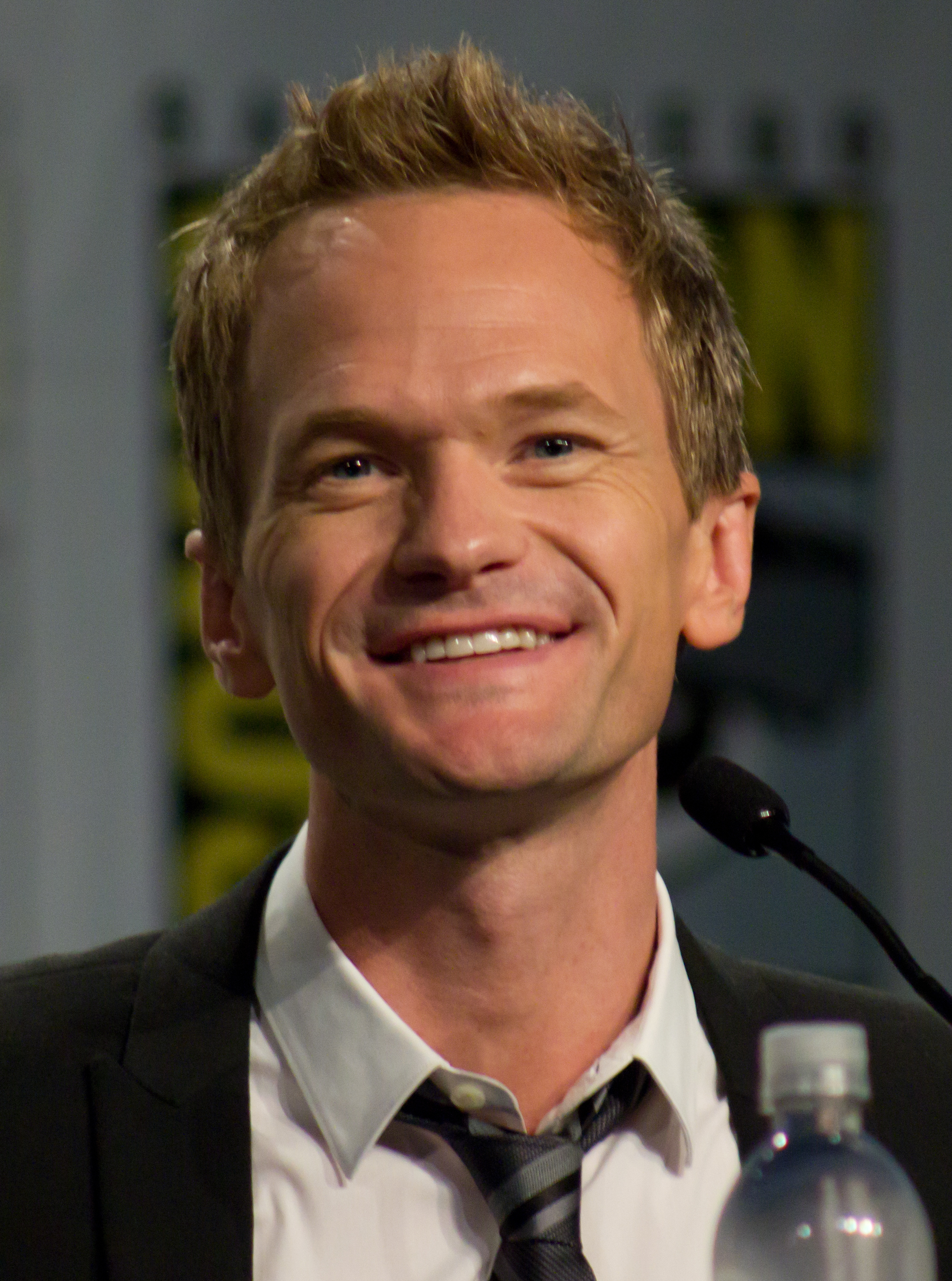
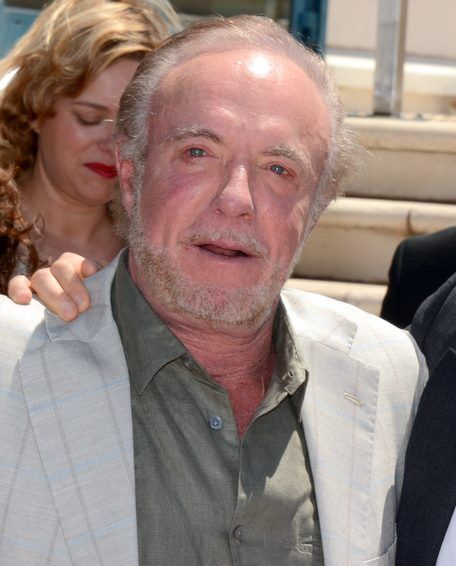
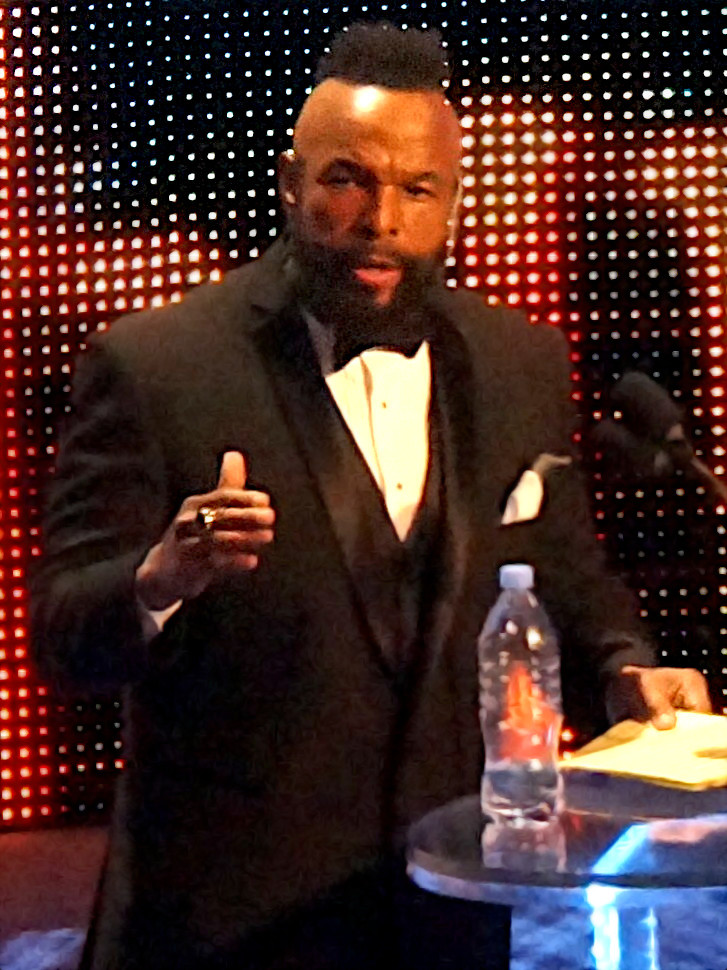
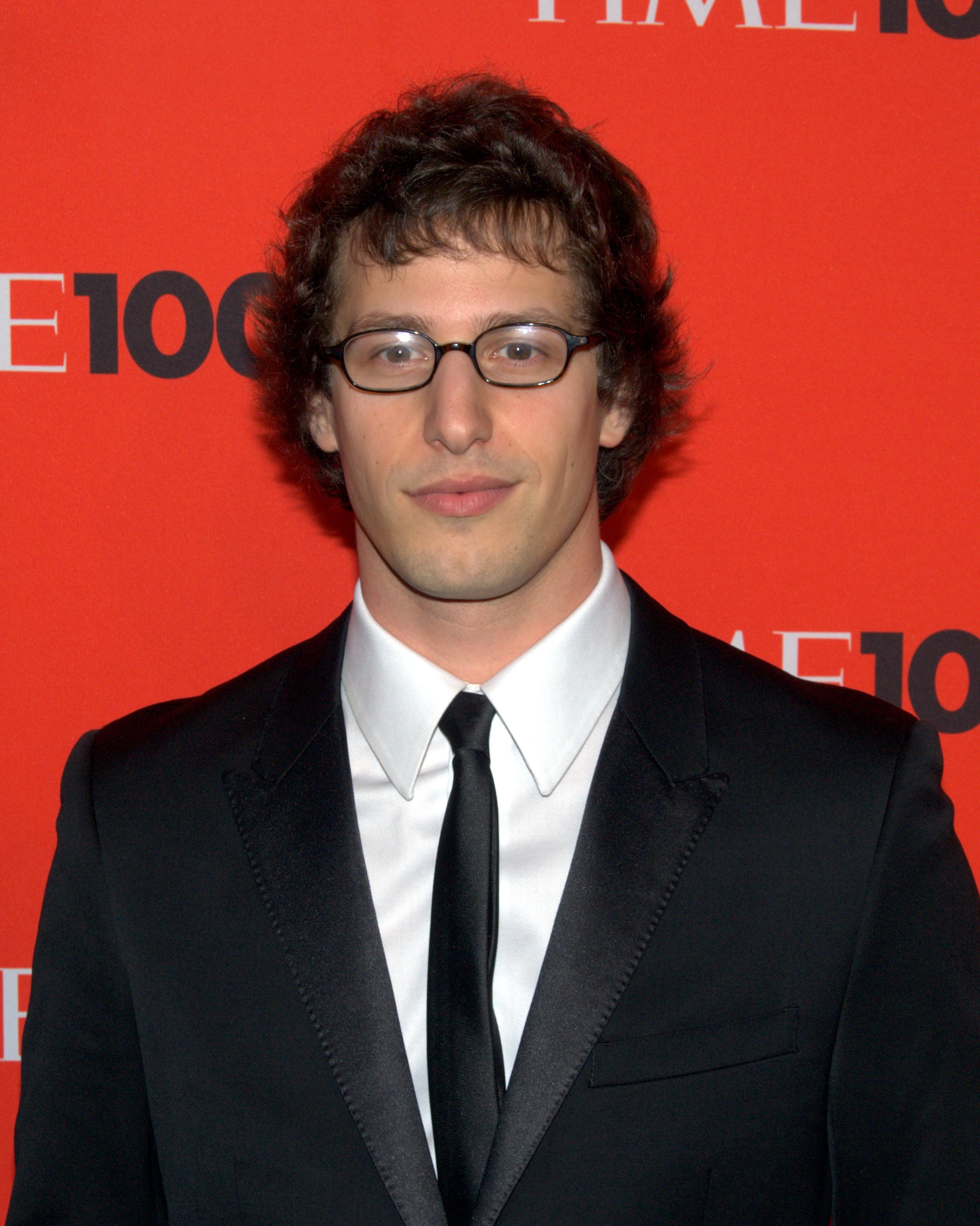
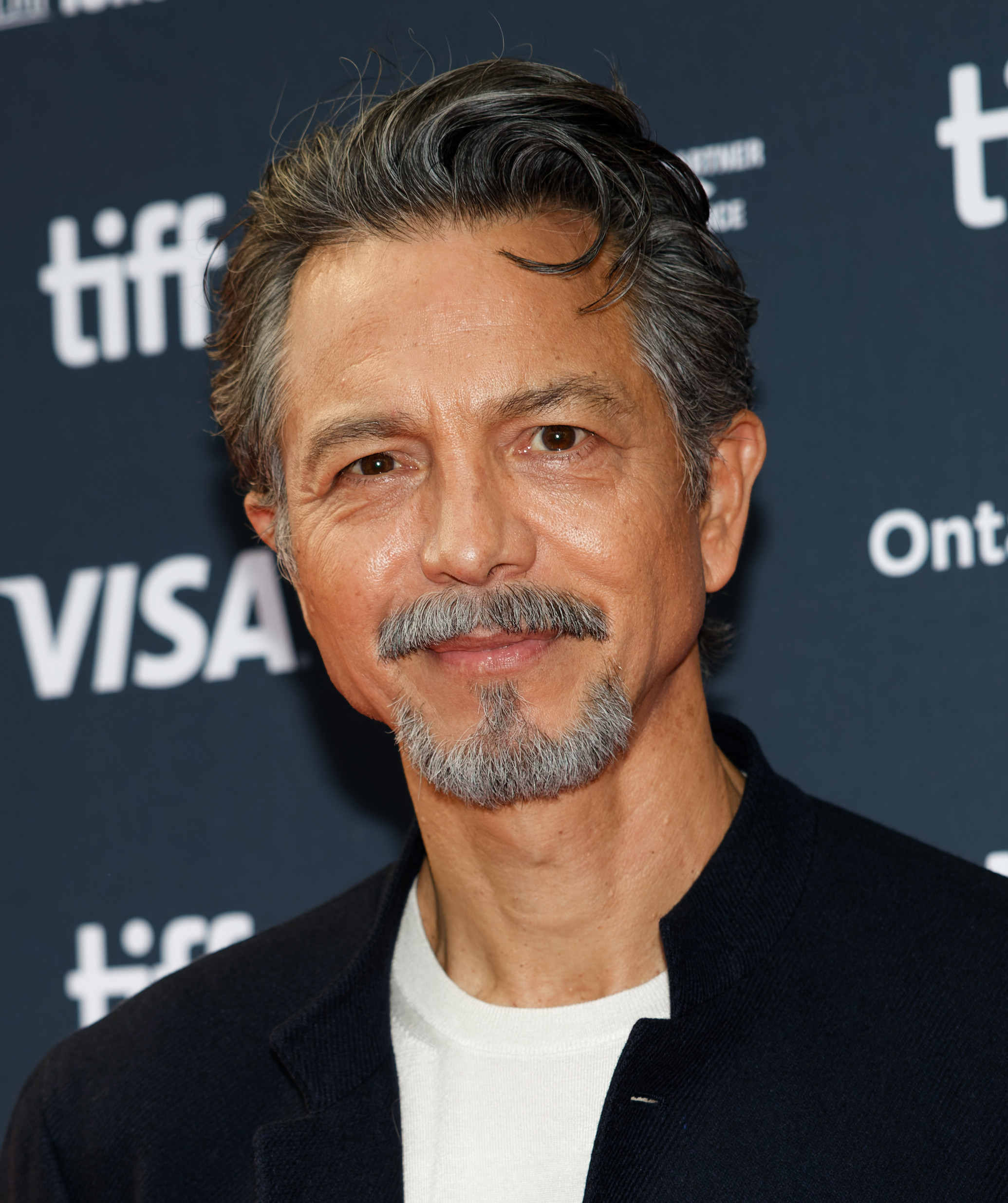
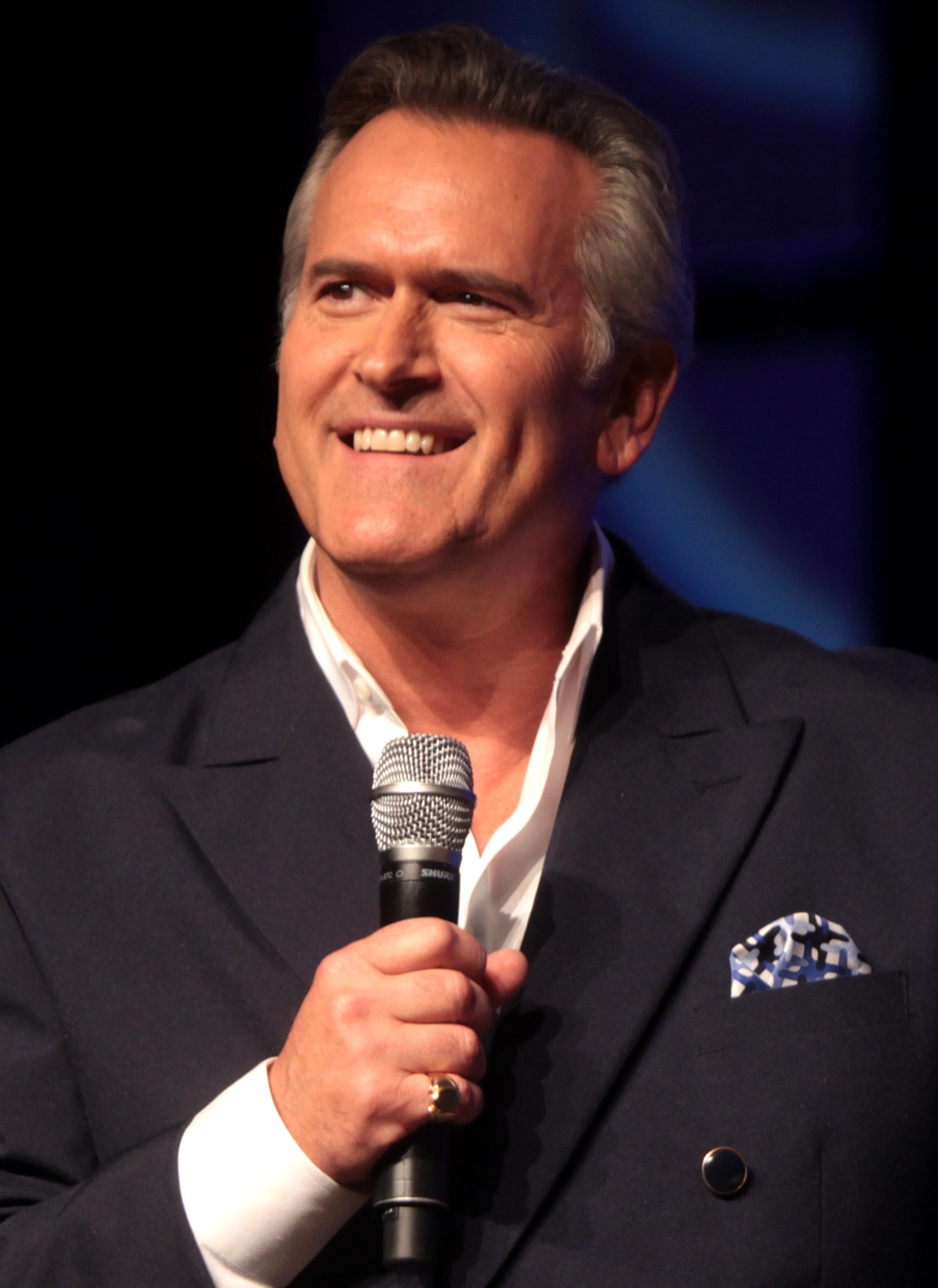
Bill Hader (left), Anna Faris, Neil Patrick Harris, James Caan, Mr. T, Andy Samberg, Benjamin Bratt and Bruce Campbell voice Flint Lockwood, Sam Sparks, Steve, Tim Lockwood, Officer Earl Devereaux, Brent McHale, Manny and Mayor Shelbourne

Voice actors in the film include:

- Bill Hader as:
  - Flint Lockwood, an unsuccessful but bright and determined scientist and inventor.
  - the FLDSMDFR, Flint's invention
    - Max Neuwirth additionally portrayed the former's younger self in the film's prologue
- Anna Faris as Samantha "Sam" Sparks, a meteorologist from New York City and later Flint's love interest
- Neil Patrick Harris as Steve, Flint's pet vervet monkey and best friend, who communicates through a thought translator Flint invented
- James Caan as Timothy "Tim" Lockwood, Flint's widowed fisherman father and fishing equipment store owner
- Bruce Campbell as Mayor Shelbourne, Swallow Falls' corrupt and greedy mayor
- Andy Samberg as "Baby" Brent McHale, the arrogant and dim-witted namesake of the Baby Brent Sardines cannery and Flint's childhood bully
- Mr. T as Officer Earl Devereaux, Swallow Falls' athletic police officer. This is the first and only film in the franchise where Mr. T voices Earl, as he would decline to reprise the role in the sequel and was replaced with Terry Crews.
- Bobb'e J. Thompson as Calvin "Cal" Devereaux, Earl's young son
- Benjamin Bratt as Manny, Sam's Guatemalan camera operator and a former doctor, pilot and comedian
- Al Roker as Patrick Patrickson, the anchorman of Weather News Network in New York City
- Lauren Graham as Fran Lockwood, Flint's late mother who always believed in her son
- Will Forte as Joe Towne, a redneck citizen of Swallow Falls who appears in certain scenes throughout the film
- Angela V. Shelton as Regina Devereaux, Earl's wife and Cal's mother

== Production ==
=== Development ===
On May 9, 2003, a year after its establishment, Sony Pictures Animation announced its first animated slate, including Cloudy with a Chance of Meatballs, a film adaptation of the book of the same name. The Brizzi brothers were brought to direct the film, with Wayne Rice adapting the screenplay. In 2006, it was reported that the film had been helmed by new directors and writers, Phil Lord and Christopher Miller. The duo said later that year that it would be a homage to, and a parody of, disaster films such as Twister, Armageddon, The Core, and The Day After Tomorrow.

=== Story and script ===
After a year working on the script, Lord and Miller were fired for story issues and replaced with new writers, who after a year were also fired. Lord and Miller were then re-hired in 2006. The two completely redid the script, this time with the creative input of their crew. The new draft had the protagonist as a failed inventor who wanted to prove himself to his town. The two were almost fired again after Amy Pascal, then-head of Sony Pictures, criticized the film for lack of story. Although the film succeeded on the comedic front in the animatic stage, Pascal cited the lack of an anchoring relationship in the film as a failure in the story telling. Unable to create new characters and environments to suit the new story demands, the two elevated the character of the tackle shop extra to be the protagonist's father, thereby creating the relationship Pascal had requested.

=== Casting ===
On September 18, 2008, Variety announced that Bill Hader and Anna Faris had signed on to voice the two lead characters, with James Caan, Bruce Campbell, Mr. T, and Andy Samberg also in the voice cast.

=== Animation ===
Cloudy with a Chance of Meatballs is the second film after Monster House that was made using the animation-rendering software Arnold. Justin K. Thompson served as production designer.

== Music ==
Cloudy with a Chance of Meatballs is the soundtrack to the film of the same name, released under Lakeshore Entertainment on September 15, 2009. The music of the film and this album are both credited to be composed and produced by American composer Mark Mothersbaugh, known for his work on Devo and Rugrats. "Raining Sunshine", performed by Miranda Cosgrove, was released as a promotional single on August 24, 2009.

The Japanese version has "Rainbow Forecast" by Shoko Nakagawa playing during the end credits.

== Release ==
Cloudy with a Chance of Meatballs made its world premiere on September 12, 2009, as the main opening headliner of the Mann Village Theatre showcase event in Los Angeles, California. The film had its wide release on September 18, 2009, along with a digitally re-mastered release to IMAX 3D theatres.

=== Home media ===
The film was released on DVD, Blu-ray Disc, and PSP UMD on January 5, 2010, in the United States and Canada. A 3D Blu-ray was released on June 22, 2010. It was the first 3D Blu-ray sold individually in the United States. The film was filmed in 2.35:1 widescreen. Most copies present the film in two discs and present the film in either its original 2.35:1 widescreen format or in a 1.78:1 widescreen format.

In April 2021, signed a deal with Disney giving them access to their legacy content, including Cloudy with a Chance of Meatballs and its sequel to stream on Disney+ and Hulu and appear on Disney's linear television networks. Disney's access to Sony's titles would come following their availability on Netflix.

=== Art book ===
In August 2009, Insight Editions published a companion book to the film called The Art and Making of Cloudy with a Chance of Meatballs.

== Reception ==
=== Critical response ===
On the review aggregator website Rotten Tomatoes, 85% of 141 critics' reviews are positive, with an average rating of 7.3/10. The website's consensus reads: "Quirky humor, plucky characters and solid slapstick make this family comedy a frenetically tasty time at the movies." Metacritic, which uses a weighted average, assigned the film a score of 66 out of 100, based on 24 critics, indicating "generally favorable" reviews. Audiences polled by CinemaScore gave the film an average grade of "A−" on an A+ to F scale.

Ernest Hardy of LA Weekly stated the film "is smart, insightful on a host of relationship dynamics, and filled with fast-paced action". Hardy also applauded the 3-D effects which "are wonderful, full of witty sight gags that play out both center-screen and on the periphery". Michael Phillips of the Chicago Tribune gave the film a mixed review stating that "Crazy doesn't always equal funny, and the gigantism of this 3-D offering's second half puts a damper on your enjoyment. But look: This film wasn't made for you, or me. It was made for dangerously, easily distracted 9-year-olds." Sandie Angulo Chen of Common Sense Media gave the film three stars out of five, noting that the "age-appropriate food adventure goes down easily."

=== Box office ===
Cloudy with a Chance of Meatballs grossed $124.9 million in the United States and Canada, and $118.1 million in other territories, for a worldwide of $243 million. The film earned $8,137,358 on its opening Friday, and ranked #1 at the box office with a total of $30.3 million for the first weekend. On its second weekend, it remained at #1 with a decrease of only 17%.

=== Accolades ===
Group	Category	Recipient	Result
Annie Awards	Animated Effects	Tom Kluyskens	Nominated
Annie Awards	Best Animated Feature		Nominated
Annie Awards	Directing in a Feature Production	Phil Lord and Christopher Miller	Nominated
Annie Awards	Writing in a Feature Production	Phil Lord and Christopher Miller	Nominated
Broadcast Film Critics Association Awards	Best Animated Feature		Nominated
Golden Globe Awards	Best Animated Feature Film		Nominated
Satellite Awards	Best Animated or Mixed Media Feature		Nominated
Visual Effects Society Awards	Outstanding Animation in an Animated Feature Motion Picture	Pete Nash, Chris Juen, Alan Hawkins, Mike Ford	Nominated
Visual Effects Society Awards	Outstanding Effects Animation in an Animated Feature Motion Picture	Rob Bredow, Dan Kramer, Matt Hausman, Carl Hooper	Nominated

== Expanded franchise ==
=== Sequel ===
A sequel, titled Cloudy with a Chance of Meatballs 2, was released on September 27, 2013. Directed by Cody Cameron and Kris Pearn, and it is based on an original idea, where Flint and his friends must again save the world from his food machine, which survived the explosion in the prequel. This time, the machine gains the ability to produce living food beasts. Most of the main cast reprised their roles, but Earl, the town cop, is now voiced by Terry Crews after Mr. T declined to reprise the role. New cast also includes Kristen Schaal as orangutan Barb, and Will Forte in his new role of Chester V.

=== Television series ===
On October 9, 2014, DHX Media announced that it would develop and produce a television series based on the film franchise, titled Cloudy with a Chance of Meatballs: The Series. The series was traditionally animated and consisted of twenty-six 22-minute episodes. It takes place before the first film, showing Flint Lockwood as a high school student who dreams of becoming a serious scientist. In his adventures, Flint is be joined by Sam Sparks, a new girl in town and the school's "wannabe" reporter, along with Flint's dad Tim, Steve the Monkey, Manny as the head of the school's audiovisual club, Earl as a school gym teacher, Brent as a baby wear model, and Mayor Shelbourne. DHX Media handled the global television and non-US home entertainment distribution, along with worldwide merchandising rights, while Sony distributed the show on home entertainment in the US. Commissioned by Teletoon in Canada, the series aired on Cartoon Network in the United States, and on the Boomerang channel in other territories. None of the original cast returned for the show and were replaced by Canadian voice actors.

== See also ==
- Cloudy with a Chance of Meatballs (video game), based on the film
- 2012, a Sony disaster film released nearly two months after Meatballs

Real-life food spill disasters and weather phenomena

- Boston Molasses Disaster
- Honolulu molasses spill
- London Beer Flood
- Kentucky meat shower
