= Judi Barrett =

American children's author (born 1941)

- Born: Judi Bauman; 1941 (age 84–85); Brooklyn, New York, U.S.
- Occupation: Author

Judi Barrett (née Bauman; born 1941) is an American author and art teacher most well known for her picture books for children, including Cloudy with a Chance of Meatballs and Animals Should Definitely Not Wear Clothing.

== Biography ==
She grew up in Brooklyn NY, and later attended the Pratt Institute, where she earned a Bachelor of Fine Arts degree in advertising design in 1962. After graduating from Pratt, Barrett worked as a freelance designer for advertising agencies before pursuing a career in education. She began teaching art and woodworking to young children in 1968 and continued to teach and study at various institutions. Barrett took graduate courses on early childhood education at the Bank Street College of Education, studied painting and pottery at the Brooklyn Museum, and taught painting to children at the New York Metropolitan Museum of Art.

While attending the Pratt Institute in the 1960s, met the illustrator Ron Barrett and soon after got married. The Barretts collaborated on their first two books, Old MacDonald Had an Apartment House and Animals Should Definitely Not Wear Clothing.

Their most famous work, Cloudy With a Chance of Meatballs, was created after their separation in 1978. The book tells the story of a town where food falls from the sky like rain and has since become a beloved classic. The book was adapted into an animated film in 2009 and a sequel in 2013.

She now teaches at The Berkeley Carroll School located in Brooklyn NY and continues writing children’s novels.

== Selected books ==
- Old MacDonald Had an Apartment House (illustrated by Ron Barrett), 1969
- Animals Should Definitely Not Wear Clothing (illustrated by Ron Barrett), 1970
- An Apple a Day (illustrated by Tim Lewis), 1973
- Benjamin's 365 Birthdays (illustrated by Ron Barrett), 1974
- Peter's Pocket (illustrated by Julia Noonan), 1974
- I Hate to Take a Bath (illustrated by Charles B. Slackman), 1975
- I Hate to Go to Bed (illustrated by Ray Cruz), Four Winds Press, 1977
- The Wind Thief (illustrated by Diane Dawson), 1977
- Cloudy with a Chance of Meatballs (illustrated by Ron Barrett), 1978
- Animals Should Definitely Not Act Like People (illustrated by Ron Barrett), 1980
- I'm Too Small, You're Too Big (illustrated by David S. Rose), 1981
- A Snake Is Totally Tail (illustrated by L. S. Johnson), 1983
- What's Left?, 1983
- Pickles Have Pimples, and Other Silly Statements (illustrated by L. S. Johnson), 1986
- Pickles to Pittsburgh: The Sequel to Cloudy With a Chance of Meatballs (illustrated by Ron Barrett), 1997
- Old MacDonald Had an Apartment House (illustrated by Ron Barrett), 1998
- The Things That Are Most in the World (illustrated by John Nickle), 1998
- I Know Two Who Said Moo: A Counting and Rhyming Book (illustrated by Daniel Moreton), 2000
- Which Witch Is Which? (illustrated by Sharleen Collicott), 2001
- Never Take a Shark to the Dentist (and Other Things Not To Do) (illustrated by John Nickle), 2008
- The Marshmallow Incident (illustrated by Ron Barrett), 2009
- The Complete Cloudy with a Chance of Meatballs (illustrated by Ron Barrett), 2009
- Santa from Cincinnati (illustrated by Kevin Hawks), 2012
- Planet of the Pies: Cloudy with a Chance of Meatballs 3 (illustrated by Isidre Monés), 2013
