= Ron Barrett =

American illustrator (born 1937)

Ron Barrett (born 1937) is an American illustrator and cartoonist best known for illustrating the 1978 children's book Cloudy with a Chance of Meatballs, which was written by his collaborator and former wife, Judi Barrett.

== Career ==
Barrett attended high school at the School of Industrial Art in New York City, where he was an apprentice in the studio of the German graphic designer Lucian Bernhard. He also found a mentor in Ervine Metzl, illustrator and president of the Society of Illustrators, who predicted that the young Mr. Barrett "...would either wind up in a mental institution or make a million dollars." He attended the Pratt Institute, where he met Judi Barrett in the 1960s. He and Judi began to collaborate on children's books, and later married.

After early success as an art director at Young & Rubicam and Carl Ally, winning the Gold Medal of the Art Directors Club of New York, Barrett left advertising to become an illustrator, author and puzzle maker. He wrote The Nutty News and has illustrated many books, such as a series of children's books with Judi Barrett, including Animals Should Definitely Not Wear Clothing and Cloudy with a Chance of Meatballs. Barrett said that when illustrating Cloudy with a Chance of Meatballs he included jokes as a form of "self entertainment", such as including Groucho glasses on a character seen in an illustration of Ralph's Roofless Restaurant: "I thought to myself, well he's wearing a disguise because the food came from de-skys".

Barrett has also worked on several books for adults, including the best-selling O. J.'s Legal Pad with Henry Beard and John Boswell. In 2009 Cloudy With a Chance of Meatballs became an animated feature in 3D, created by Sony Pictures Animation.

During the 1970s, Barrett published comic strips in the National Lampoon "Funny Pages", of which the best remembered is perhaps "Politenessman". He became the magazine's art director, giving it a style described as "crisp" and "smart".

== Books ==
- Animals Should Definitely Not Act Like People, 1988 hardcover reissue, Aladdin (ISBN 0-689-71287-1) (Illustrator, with Judi Barrett)
- Animals Should Definitely Not Wear Clothing, 1988, Aladdin (ISBN 0-689-70807-6) (Illustrator, with Judi Barrett)
- Cloudy With a Chance of Meatballs, 1978, Aladdin (ISBN 0-689-30647-4) (Illustrator, with Judi Barrett)
- Old Macdonald had some flats, 1969, Longman group limited (ISBN 0-582-15018-3) (Illustrator, with Judith Barrett)
- The Nutty News, 2005 hardcover reissue, Knopf, (ISBN 0-375-92751-4)
- Pickles to Pittsburgh: The Sequel to Cloudy with a Chance of Meatballs, 1997, Alladin (ISBN 0-689-80104-1) (Illustrator, with Judi Barrett)
