= Cloudy with a Chance of Meatballs =

1978 children's book by Judi and Ron Barrett

- Author: Judi Barrett
- Illustrator: Ron Barrett
- Cover artist: Ron Barrett
- Genre: Fantasy, Children's picture book
- Publisher: Simon & Schuster
- Publication date: August 1, 1978
- Publication place: United States
- ISBN: 0-689-30647-4
- Followed by: Pickles to Pittsburgh

Cloudy with a Chance of Meatballs is a children's book written by Judi Barrett and illustrated by Ron Barrett. It was first published in 1978 by Atheneum Books, followed by a 1982 trade paperback edition from sister company Aladdin Paperbacks. It is now published by Simon & Schuster. Based on a 2007 online poll, the National Education Association listed the book as one of its "Teachers' Top 100 Books for Children". It was one of the "Top 100 Picture Books" of all time in a 2012 poll by School Library Journal.

A sequel, Pickles to Pittsburgh, was published in 1997 by Atheneum Books; a hardcover edition followed in 2009. A second sequel, Planet of the Pies, was published on August 27, 2013.

== Plot ==
Inspired by an accident while making pancakes at breakfast, a grandfather tells his grandchildren a bedtime story about a town called Chewandswallow, where food and drinks conveniently fall from the sky in place of weather, providing them with sufficient food for every meal. However, this takes a sudden turn for the worse, with events such as spaghetti tangling traffic and fog literally made of pea soup developing. The amount and size of the food drastically increases, creating natural disasters and leading to other issues such as causing the permanent closure of the local school, and homes being crushed by the giant foods. The citizens become endangered by the continuous deluge of food, and realize that they have no choice but to abandon Chewandswallow. To evacuate, the people take to sea, using sail boats made out of giant sandwiches. They eventually reach a new town, where they get used to ordinary weather and purchasing foods at the supermarkets instead of having it fall from the sky, and they never return to Chewandswallow. The grandchildren fall asleep shortly after the story concludes and the next morning, they wake up to a snow day. They then imagine that the snow-covered hilltop with the sun rising over it is some butter-topped mashed potatoes.

== Sequels ==
Pickles to Pittsburgh

The follow-up to the story, Pickles to Pittsburgh, released on October 1, 1997, tells of the kids receiving a postcard from their grandfather, who claims to be visiting the ruins of what was once the fabled town of Chewandswallow. The kids then go to sleep and dream that they are there with him, helping to rebuild the post-apocalyptic landscape and restore it to where it is livable again, as well as giving the massive amounts of food away to poverty-stricken developing nations and homeless shelters around the world. This proves to be difficult, as there could be more food storms on the way.

Planet of the Pies

A third book in the series, Cloudy with a Chance of Meatballs 3: Planet of the Pies, was released on August 27, 2013. It details a dream Grandpa had about the first crewed expedition to Mars, where the Martian society is being overrun by daily storms of pies.

== Film adaptations ==
On September 18, 2009, Sony Pictures Animation released an animated film adaptation of the book; it was released on DVD on January 5, 2010. A new cast of characters were created to assist plot development, and the synopsis was changed from food produced by the weather to food made by a machine known as the FLDSMDFR. Bill Hader and Anna Faris provided the voices of the two lead characters, Flint Lockwood, "a young inventor who dreams of creating something that will improve everyone's life", and Samantha "Sam" Sparks, "a weathergirl covering the situation who hides her intelligence behind a perky exterior". James Caan, Bruce Campbell, Mr. T, Andy Samberg, Neil Patrick Harris, Bobb'e J. Thompson, Benjamin Bratt, Al Roker, Lauren Graham, and Will Forte are also on the voice cast. Co-writers and co-directors Phil Lord and Christopher Miller said that it would be a homage to, and a parody of, disaster movies such as Twister, Armageddon, and The Day After Tomorrow, as well as Sony's then-upcoming 2012, released nearly two months later.

Unlike the book, in which a grandfather tells his two grandchildren a bedtime story about Chewandswallow, in the movie an inventor named Flint Lockwood creates a machine that turns water vapor in the atmosphere into food. Originally the machine's output was limited to Swallow Falls (said in the movie to be the original name of Chewandswallow), but overuse of the machine causes it to malfunction and the food weather to take a turn for the worse, as well as spreading it across the world.

A sequel to the first film, titled Cloudy with a Chance of Meatballs 2, was released on September 27, 2013; it features an original storyline and is unrelated to the book's sequel Pickles to Pittsburgh.
