= Lesley Gore discography =

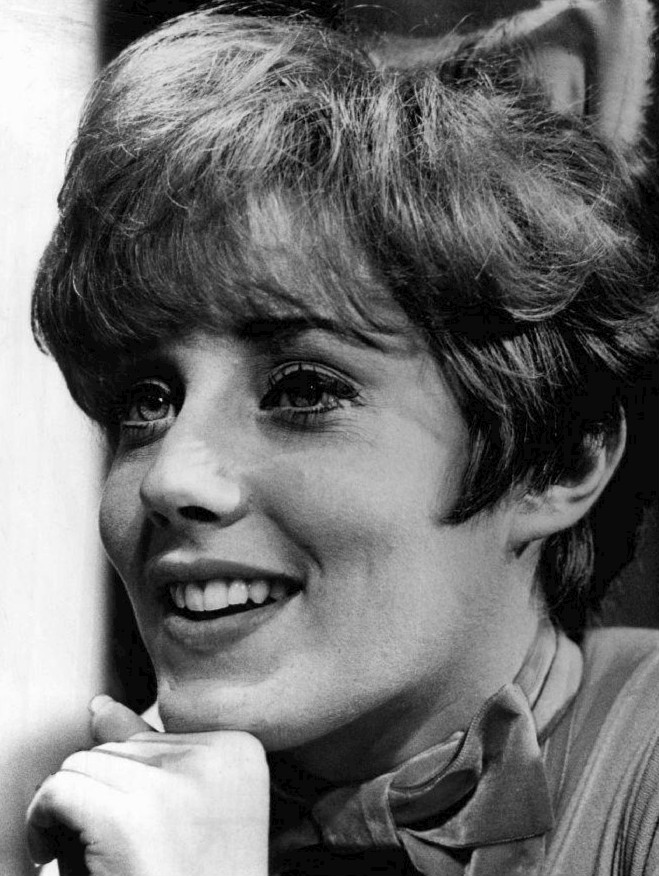
- Lesley Gore on Batman
- Studio albums: 12
- Compilation albums: 9
- Singles: 37
- Other charted songs: 3
- Box sets: 1

The discography of American singer and songwriter, Lesley Gore, contains 12 studio albums, nine compilation albums, 37 singles and three other charted songs. Her debut single was 1963's "It's My Party", which reached number one on five major charts: the US Hot 100, the US R&B chart, the Australian Kent Music Report, the Canadian CHUM Chart and New Zealand's RIANZ chart. It was followed by her debut studio album in 1963 titled I'll Cry If I Want To, which reached number 24 on the US Billboard 200. "Judy's Turn to Cry" was Gore's second single and was also spawned from the album, reaching the top ten in the US, Canada and New Zealand. Gore's next two singles reached the top ten in the US, Canada, Australia, New Zealand and Sweden: "She's a Fool" and "You Don't Own Me". Both appeared on her second LP, Lesley Gore Sings of Mixed-Up Hearts (1963).

Gore's third and fourth studio albums were released in 1964: Boys, Boys, Boys and Girl Talk. Both albums reached positions on the US Billboard 200. Five singles were included on the LP's, including the two US top 20 songs: "That's the Way Boys Are" and "Maybe I Know". Gore's 1965 single, "Sunshine, Lollipops and Rainbows" reached number 13 in the US and number six in Canada. The same year saw the release of her fifth album, My Town, My Guy & Me, whose title track reached top 40 positions in the US and Canada. Gore's 1967 album, California Nights, was her final to make the Billboard 200, reaching number 169. Its title track, made the US and Canadian top 20 singles charts in 1967.

Both "98.6/Lazy Day" and "Why Doesn't Love Make Me Happy" made the US adult contemporary chart through 1970. Her next studio album was not released until 1972's MoWest issue of Someplace Else Now. It was followed by 1975's Love Me by Name, which was issued by A&M Records. In 1982, her tenth album The Canvas Can Do Miracles was released by the 51 West label. In 2005, Gore's eleventh studio album was issued titled Ever Since. Her final album was an unreleased Mercury project from 1967 titled Magic Colors: The Lost Album (2011).

== Albums ==
=== Studio albums ===
List of studio albums, with selected chart positions, and other relevant details
Title	Album details	Peak chart positions	
Title	Album details	US BB	US CB
I'll Cry If I Want To	Released: June 1963; Label: Mercury; Formats: LP	24	18
Lesley Gore Sings of Mixed-Up Hearts	Released: November 1963; Label: Mercury; Formats: LP	125	51
Boys, Boys, Boys	Released: March 1964; Label: Mercury; Formats: LP	127	41
Girl Talk	Released: October 1964; Label: Mercury; Formats: LP	146	87
My Town, My Guy & Me	Released: September 1965; Label: Mercury; Formats: LP	120	—
Lesley Gore Sings All About Love	Released: January 1966; Label: Mercury; Formats: LP	—	—
California Nights	Released: February 1967; Label: Mercury; Formats: LP	169	72
Someplace Else Now	Released: July 1972; Label: MoWest; Formats: LP	—	—
Love Me by Name	Released: May 1975; Label: A&M; Formats: LP	—	—
The Canvas Can Do Miracles	Released: May 1982; Label: 51 West; Formats: LP, cassette	—	—
Ever Since	Released: June 28, 2005; Label: Engine Company; Formats: CD	—	—
Magic Colors: The Lost Album	Released: June 2011; Label: Ace; Formats: CD	—	—
"—" denotes a recording that did not chart or was not released in that territory.

=== Compilation albums ===
List of compilation albums, with selected chart positions, and other relevant details
Title	Album details	Peak chart positions	
Title	Album details	US BB	US CB
The Golden Hits of Lesley Gore	Released: 1965; Label: Mercury; Formats: LP	95	53
Lesley Gore's Golden Hits, Vol. 2	Released: 1969; Label: Mercury; Formats: LP	—	—
The Sound of Young Love	Released: 1969; Label: Mercury/Wing; Formats: LP	—	—
The Best of Lesley Gore	Released: 1977; Label: Mercury; Formats: LP	—	—
The Lesley Gore Anthology	Released: 1986; Label: Rhino; Formats: LP, cassette	—	—
It's My Party	Released: 1992; Label: Mercury/PolyGram; Formats: CD, cassette	—	—
It's My Party: The Mercury Anthology	Released: 1996; Label: Mercury; Formats: CD, cassette	—	—
The Best of Lesley Gore: Sunshine, Lollipops & Rainbows	Released: 1998; Label: Rhino; Formats: CD	—	—
20th Century Masters: The Millennium Collection	Released: 2000; Label: Mercury; Formats: CD	—	—
"—" denotes a recording that did not chart or was not released in that territory.

== Box sets ==
List of box sets, showing all relevant details
Title	Album details
Lesley Gore: It's My Party	Released: June 21, 1994; Label: Bear Family; Formats: CD

== Singles ==
List of singles, with selected chart positions, showing other relevant details
Title	Year	Peak chart positions								Certifications	Album
Title	Year	US	US AC	US R&B	AUS	CAN	NZ	SWE	UK	Certifications	Album
"It's My Party"	1963	1	—	1	1	1	1	20	9		I'll Cry If I Want To
"Judy's Turn to Cry"	1963	5	—	10	19	5	8	—	—		I'll Cry If I Want To
"She's a Fool"	1963	5	—	26	28	8	7	—	—		Lesley Gore Sings of Mixed-Up Hearts
"You Don't Own Me"	1963	2	—	—	4	5	2	9	—	BPI: Silver	Lesley Gore Sings of Mixed-Up Hearts
"That's the Way Boys Are"	1964	12	—	—	16	26	—	—	—		Boys, Boys, Boys
"I Don't Wanna Be a Loser"	1964	37	12	—	—	41	—	—	—		Boys, Boys, Boys
"Maybe I Know"	1964	14	—	—	37	16	—	—	20		Girl Talk
"Hey Now"	1964	76	—	—	—	33	—	—	—		Girl Talk
"Look of Love"	1964	27	—	—	89	17	—	—	—		Girl Talk
"All of My Life"	1965	71	—	—	—	37	—	—	—		—N/a
"Sunshine, Lollipops and Rainbows"	1965	13	—	—	53	6	—	—	—		Lesley Gore Sings of Mixed-Up Hearts
"My Town, My Guy and Me"	1965	32	—	—	88	30	—	—	—		My Town, My Guy & Me
"I Won't Love You Anymore (Sorry)"	1965	80	—	—	—	92	—	—	—		Lesley Gore Sings All About Love
"We Know We're in Love"	1966	76	—	—	—	—	—	—	—		Lesley Gore Sings All About Love
"Young Love"	1966	50	—	—	24	43	—	—	—		Lesley Gore Sings All About Love
"Off and Running"	1966	— (Note: "Off and Running" did not enter the Hot 100, but peaked at number eight on Bubbling Under Hot 100 Singles, which acts as a 25-song extension of the Hot 100.)	—	—	—	75	—	—	—		California Nights
"Treat Me Like a Lady"	1966	— (Note: "Treat Me Like a Lady" did not enter the Hot 100, but peaked at number 15 on Bubbling Under Hot 100 Singles chart.)	—	—	—	—	—	—	—		California Nights
"California Nights"	1967	16	—	—	—	15	—	—	—		California Nights
"Summer and Sandy"	1967	65	—	—	—	46	—	—	—		—N/a
"Brink of Disaster"	1967	82	—	—	—	84	—	—	—		Magic Colors: The Lost Album
"Magic Colors"	1967	—	—	—	—	—	—	—	—		Magic Colors: The Lost Album
"Small Talk"	1968	— (Note: "Small Talk" did not enter the Hot 100, but peaked at number 24 on Bubbling Under Hot 100 Singles chart.)	—	—	—	—	—	—	—		—N/a
"He Gives Me Love (La, La, La)"	1968	— (Note: "He Gives Me Love (La, La, La)" did not enter the Hot 100, but peaked at number 19 on Bubbling Under Hot 100 Singles chart.)	—	—	—	86	—	—	—		—N/a
"I Can't Make It Without You"	1968	—	—	—	—	—	—	—	—		—N/a
"I'll Be Standing By"	1968	—	—	—	—	—	—	—	—		—N/a
"Take Good Care (Of My Heart)"	1969	—	—	—	—	—	—	—	—		—N/a
"98.6/Lazy Day"	1969	—	36	—	—	—	—	—	—		—N/a
"Wedding Bell Blues"	1969	—	—	—	—	—	—	—	—		—N/a
"Why Doesn't Love Make Me Happy"	1970	—	39	—	—	—	—	—	—		—N/a
"Come Softly to Me"	1970	—	—	—	—	—	—	—	—		—N/a
"When Yesterday Was Tomorrow"	1970	—	—	—	—	—	—	—	—		—N/a
"Back Together"	1971	—	—	—	—	—	—	—	—		—N/a
"She Said That"	1972	—	—	—	—	—	—	—	—		Someplace Else Now
"Immortality"	1975	—	—	—	—	—	—	—	55 (Note: The chart position for "Immortality" is taken from the official UK "Breakers List".)		Love Me by Name
"Sometimes" (with The Brothers Johnson)	1976	—	—	—	—	—	—	—	—		Love Me by Name
"Since I Don't Have You/It's Only Make Believe" (with Lou Christie)	1986	—	—	—	—	—	—	—	—		—N/a
"—" denotes a recording that did not chart or was not released in that territory.

== Other charted songs ==
List of songs, with selected chart positions and notes, showing other relevant details
Title	Year	Peak chart positions						Album	Notes
Title	Year	US	US AC	US R&B	AUS	CAN	NZ	Album	Notes
"Just Let Me Cry"	1963	—	—	10	19	5	8	I'll Cry If I Want To	(Note: B-side to "Judy's Turn to Cry". The song was credited along with the A-side's chart positions in various countries (see references above).)
"It's Gotta Be You"	1964	—	12	—	41	—	—	Boys, Boys, Boys	(Note: B-side to "I Don't Wanna Be a Loser". The song was credited along with the A-side's chart positions in various countries (see references above).)
"Sometimes I Wish I Were a Boy"	1964	86	—	—	36	—	—	Girl Talk	(Note: B-side to "Hey Now".)
"—" denotes a recording that did not chart or was not released in that territory.
