= Lesley Gore: It's My Party =

Box set by Lesley Gore
- Released: June 21, 1994
- Genre: Pop
- Label: Bear Family

Lesley Gore chronology
The Lesley Gore Anthology (1986)	Lesley Gore: It's My Party (1994)	Sunshine, Lollipops, and Rainbows: The Best of Lesley Gore (1998)

Lesley Gore: It's My Party is a five disc box set from Bear Family Records released June 21, 1994, that includes every Mercury Records release by Gore between 1963 and 1969. It also includes foreign language versions and never-released songs.

== Track listing ==
Disc one

1. "Hello, Young Lover (You Ain't Gonna Get My Heart)" (Paul Anka)
2. "Something Wonderful" (Oscar Hammerstein II/Richard Rodgers)
3. "It's My Party" (John Gluck Jr./Wally Gold/Herbert Weiner)
4. "Danny" (Anka)
5. "The Party's Over" (Betty Comden/Adolph Green/Jule Styne)
6. "Judy's Turn to Cry" (Edna Lewis/Beverly Ross)
7. "Just Let Me Cry" (Mark Barkan/Ben Raleigh)
8. "Misty" (Johnny Burke/Erroll Garner)
9. "Cry Me a River" (Arthur Hamilton)
10. "I Would" (Kurt Feltz/Lewis/Werner Scharfenberger)
11. "No More Tears (Left to Cry)" (Barkan/Sandy Baron)
12. "Cry and You Cry Alone" (Hilda H. Earnhart)
13. "I Understand" (Kim Gannon/Mabel Wayne)
14. "Cry" (Churchill Kohlman)
15. "Sunshine, Lollipops and Rainbows" (Marvin Hamlisch/Howard Liebling)
16. "What Kind of Fool Am I?" (Leslie Bricusse/Anthony Newley)
17. "If That's the Way You Want It" (Dennis Lambert/Brian Potter)
18. "She's a Fool" (Barkan/Raleigh)
19. "I'll Make It Up to You" (Lewis/Gloria Shayne)
20. "The Old Crowd" (Gerry Goffin/Carole King)
21. "I Struck a Match" (Arthur Resnick/Bobby Scott)
22. "Consolation Prize" (Lewis/Shayne)
23. "Run, Bobby, Run" (Barkan/Raleigh)
24. "Young and Foolish" (Albert Hague/Arnold Horwitt)
25. "Fools Rush In (Where Angels Fear to Tread)" (Rube Bloom/Johnny Mercer)
26. "My Foolish Heart" (Ned Washington/Victor Young)
27. "That's the Way the Ball Bounces" (Hamlisch/Liebling)
28. "After He Takes Me Home" [Single voice] (Günther Heigel/Shayne)
29. "After He Takes Me Home" [Two-voice overdub] (Heigel/Shayne)
30. "You Don't Own Me" [Mono single version with single voice] (John Madara/David White)
31. "You Don't Own Me" [Stereo album version with two-voice overdub] (Madara/White)
32. "Time to Go" (Barkan/Raleigh)
33. "You Name It" (Norman Blagman/Lewis)

Disc two

1. "That's the Way Boys Are" (Barkan/Raleigh)
2. "Boys" (Anka)
3. "I'm Coolin', No Foolin'" (Lesley Gore/Sydney Shaw)
4. "Don't Deny It"
5. "I Don't Wanna Be a Loser" (Barkan/Raleigh)
6. "It's Gotta Be You" (Barkan/Claus Ogerman)
7. "Leave Me Alone" (L. Gore)
8. "Don't Call Me" (Medara/White)
9. "Look of Love" [Single version] (Jeff Barry/Ellie Greenwich)
10. "Look of Love" [Album version] (Barry/Greenwich)
11. "Wonder Boy" (Jimmie Steward Jr./Sidney J. Wyche)
12. "Secret Love" (Sammy Fain/Paul Francis Webster)
13. "Maybe I Know" (Barry/Greenwich)
14. "Live and Learn" (William Carl/Madara/White)
15. "Sometimes I Wish I Were a Boy" (Steve Donroy/Gluck Jr.)
16. "Hey! Now" (Sonny Gordon)
17. "I Died Inside" (L. Gore)
18. "Movin' Away" (Len Praverman)
19. "It's Just About That Time" (Van McCoy)
20. "Little Girl, Go Home" (Manny Curtis/Jeffrey Davis)
21. "Say Goodbye" (Larry Marks)
22. "You've Come Back" (McCoy)
23. "That's the Boy" (Barry Mann/Cynthia Weil)
24. "All of My Life" (Helen Miller/Tony Powers)
25. "What's a Girl Supposed to Do?" (Barry/Greenwich)
26. "Before and After" (McCoy)
27. "I Cannot Hope for Anyone" (Enrico Ciacci/L. Gore/Giovanni Meccia)
28. "I Don't Care" (Madara/White)
29. "You Didn't Look 'Round" (Glen Stuart/Nola York)

Disc three

1. "Baby, That's Me" (Jackie DeShannon/Jack Nitzsche)
2. "No Matter What You Do" (Mike Post/Dick St. John)
3. "Sunshine, Lollipops and Rainbows" (Hamlisch/Liebling)
4. "What Am I Gonna Do With You?" (Goffin/Russ Titelman)
5. "It's All in the Game" (Charles G. Dawes/Carl Sigman)
6. "Love, Look Away" (Hammerstein II/Rodgers)
7. "Let It Be Me" (Gilbert Bécaud/Curtis/Pierre Delanoë)
8. "When Sunny Gets Blue" (Marvin Fisher/Jack Segal)
9. "What Am I Gonna Do With You?" (Goffin/Titelman)
10. "A Girl in Love" (L. Gore)
11. "Just Another Fool" (Lambert/Louis Pegues)
12. "My Town, My Guy, and Me" (Bob Elgin/L. Gore/Paul Kaufman)
13. "Let Me Dream" (Teddy Randazzo/Lou Stallman/Bobby Weinstein)
14. "The Things We Did Last Summer" (Sammy Cahn/Styne)
15. "Start the Party Again" (Resnick/Kenny Young)
16. "I Can Tell" (Steve Duboff/Artie Kornfeld)
17. "I Won't Love You Anymore (Sorry)" (L. Gore/Michael Gore)
18. "I Just Can't Get Enough of You" (Jo Armstead/Nickolas Ashford)
19. "Only Last Night" (Barry Mason/Les Reed)
20. "With Any Other Girl" (Shelly Coburn)
21. "I Can Tell" (Duboff/Kornfeld)
22. "To Know Him is to Love Him" (Phil Spector)
23. "Young Love" (Ric Cartey/Carole Joyner)
24. "Too Young" (Sylvia Dee/Sidney Lippman)
25. "Will You Love Me Tomorrow?" (Goffin/King)
26. "We Know We're in Love" (L. Gore/M. Gore)
27. "Yeah, Yeah, Yeah (That Boy of Mine)" (Charles Koppelman/Kornfeld/Don Rubin)
28. "That's What I'll Do" (George Motola/Rickie Page)
29. "Lilacs and Violets" (Fred Anisfield/Larry Weiss)
30. "Off and Running" (Carole Bayer/Toni Wine)
31. "Happiness Is Just Around the Corner" (McCoy)

Disc four

1. "Hold Me Tight" (L. Gore/M. Gore)
2. "Cry Like a Baby" (Armstead/Ashford/Valerie Simpson)
3. "Treat Me Like a Lady" (Gary Knight)
4. "Maybe Now" (L. Gore/M. Gore)
5. The Bubble Broke" (Bob Crewe/Raymond Bloodworth/L. Russell Brown)
6. "California Nights" (Hamlisch/Liebling)
7. "I'm Going Out (The Same Way I Came In)" (Crewe)
8. "Bad" (Crewe/Joel Hirschhorn/Al Kasha)
9. "Love Goes on Forever" (Knight)
10. "Summer and Sandy" (Crewe/Bloodworth/Brown)
11. "I'm Fallin' Down" (L. Gore/M. Gore)
12. "Brink of Disaster" (Jimmy Griffin/Michael Z. Gordon)
13. "On a Day Like Today" (Bodie Chandler/Edward McKendry)
14. "Where Can I Go?" (L. Gore/M. Gore)
15. "You Sent Me Silver Bells" (Randazzo/Victoria Pike)
16. "I'm Fallin' Down" (L. Gore/M. Gore)
17. "He Won't See the Light" (John Carter/Eric Woolfson)
18. "Magic Colors" (Howard Greenfield/Neil Sedaka)
19. "How Can I Be Sure?" (Eddie Brigati/Felix Cavaliere)
20. To Sir, With Love" (Don Black/Mark London)
21. It's a Happening World" (Mann/Weil)
22. "Small Talk" (Garry Bonner/Alan Gordon)
23. "Say What You See" (Tim Hallinan/Robb Royer)
24. "He Gives Me Love (La La La)" (Manuel de La Calva/Michael Julien/Ramón Arcusa)
25. "Brand New Me" (Francine Neiman/Knight)
26. "I Can't Make It Without You" (Gary Geld/Peter Udell)
27. "Look the Other Way" (Thom Bell/Mikki Farrow)
28. "Take Good Care (Of My Heart)" (Bell/Farrow)
29. "I'll Be Standing By" (Cindy Scott)

Disc five

1. "Ride a Tall White Horse" (L. Gore/M. Gore)
2. "98.6/Lazy Day" (George Fischoff/Powers)
3. Summer Symphony" (Greenfield/Sedaka)
4. "All Cried Out" (Buddy Kaye/Phil Springer)
5. "One By One" (Hamlisch/Liebling)
6. "Wedding Bell Blues" (Laura Nyro)
7. "Got to Get You Into My Life" (John Lennon/Paul McCartney)
8. "Goodbye, Tony" ["You Don't Own Me" in German] (G. Loose/Madara/White)
9. "Musikant" ["Time to Go" in German] (Barkan/Heigel/Raleigh)
10. "So sind die Boys alle" ["That's the Way Boys Are" in German] (Barkan/Hans Bradtke/Raleigh)
11. "Nur du ganz allein" ["It's Gotta Be You" in German] (Barkan/Jean Nicolas/Ogerman)
12. "Hab' ich das verdient" (Fini Busch/Scharfenberger)
13. "Der erste Tanz" (Busch/Scharfenberger)
14. "Little, Little Liebling" (Charly Niessen)
15. "Sieben Girls" (Feltz/Scharfenberger)
16. "Tu t'en vas" ["Time to Go" in French] (Barkan/Billy Nencioli/Raleigh/Jacques Revaux)
17. "Je ne sais plus" ["You Don't Own Me" in French] (Madara/Nencioli/Revaux/White)
18. "Je n'ose pas" ["Run, Bobby, Run" in French] (Barkan/Gérard Melet/Raleigh)
19. "Si ton cœur le désire" ["If That's The Way You Want It" in French] (Ralph Bernet/Lambert/Potter)
20. "Je sais qu'un jour" ["Maybe I Know" in French] (Barry/Claude Carrère/Greenwich/André Salvet)
21. "C'est trop tard" ["Live and Learn" in French] (Madara/Carl Michèle Vendome/White)
22. "Eh! Non" ["Hey! Now" in French] (S. Gordon/Johnny Reich)
23. "Te voilà" ["You've Come Back" in French] (McCoy/Mya Simille)
24. "Judy's Turn to Cry" [In Italian] (Lewis/Ross)
25. "You Don't Own Me" [In Italian] (Madara/White)
