= The Best of the Girl Groups =

The Best of the Girl Groups, Vol. 1

Compilation album by various artists
- Released: 1990
- Genre: Girl group
- Label: Rhino
- Producer: Bill Inglot

The Best of the Girl Groups, Vol. 2

Professional ratings
Review scores
Source	Rating
(Vol.1) Allmusic	4/5 stars
(Vol. 2)Allmusic	4.5/5 stars

The Best of the Girl Groups is a 2-volume compilation series released by Rhino Records in 1990. The collection, compiling 36 of the better known tracks by girl groups of the 1960s, is listed at #421 in Rolling Stone's list of "Greatest Albums of All Time". Music journalist Robert Christgau includes the compilation in his "core collection" for an essential rock library of music preceding 1980. Entertainment Weekly described the first volume as "a veritable catalog of the era's romantic attitudes". The New York Times recommends both volumes, in conjunction with Rhino's Girl Group Greats, for listeners seeking "the biggest girl-group hits".

== Song selection ==
The compilation collects a broad range of the era's well-known hits, featuring seven #1 hit singles and an additional 14 top ten hits among its 36 tracks, but it includes lesser-known material as well, enough—according to AllMusic—to "keep the collection interesting for more serious fans of girl group pop". The collection includes two representative tracks of Ellie Greenwich, a prolific charting songwriter whose own material both solo and with The Raindrops was often overlooked. The included solo single "You Don't Know" was described by journalist Alan Betrock in his book Girl Groups: The Story of a Sound as "the kind of record that not only transcends and expands the boundaries that come to mind when someone says, 'Girl-group record,' but...also can stand alone, totally unique and unmatched by any other competition". "I Can't Let Go", a 1965 song by Evie Sands which did not chart, was critically described as "superb" though the song failed to capture popular interest until covered by The Hollies a year later. "The One You Can't Have" is one of several "outstanding" singles by popular backing vocalists The Honeys that failed to achieve commercial success. Cher's brush with the girl group genre is also represented, by the 1965 "Dream Baby", a "girl group classic" if not a charting single.

== Track listing ==
=== The Best of the Girl Groups, Volume 1 ===
#	Title	Composer	Performer	Chart Position	Time
1	"Leader of the Pack"	(Jeff Barry, Ellie Greenwich, Shadow Morton)	The Shangri-Las	#1 Black Singles #1 Pop Singles	2:54
2	"He's So Fine"	(Ronnie Mack)	The Chiffons	#1 Black Singles #1 Pop Singles	1:54
3	"Chapel of Love"	(Barry, Greenwich, Phil Spector)	The Dixie Cups	#1 Black Singles #1 Pop Singles	2:50
4	"The Boy from New York City"	(George Davis, John T. Taylor)	The Ad Libs	#6 Black Singles #8 Pop Singles	3:02
5	"The Shoop Shoop Song (It's in His Kiss)"	(Rudy Clark)	Betty Everett	#6 Black Singles #6 Pop Singles	2:16
6	"Sally Go 'Round the Roses"	(Zell Sanders, Abner Spector)	The Jaynetts	#4 Black Singles #2 Pop Singles	3:16
7	"Will You Love Me Tomorrow"	(Gerry Goffin, Carole King)	The Shirelles	#2 Black Singles #1 Pop Singles	2:44
8	"Remember (Walking in the Sand)"	(Morton)	The Shangri-Las	#5 Black Singles #5 Pop Singles	2:20
9	"One Fine Day"	(Goffin, King)	The Chiffons	#6 Black Singles #5 Pop Singles	2:10
10	"Party Lights"	(Claudine Clark)	Claudine Clark	#3 Black Singles #5 Pop Singles	2:24
11	"People Say"	(Barry, Greenwich)	The Dixie Cups	#12 Black Singles #12 Pop Singles	2:46
12	"He's Got the Power"	(Elle Greenwich, Tony Powers)	The Exciters	#57 Pop Singles	2:24
13	"I Can't Stay Mad at You"	(Goffin, King)	Skeeter Davis	#2 Adult Contemporary #14 Country Singles #7 Pop Singles	2:09
14	"I Wanna Love Him So Bad"	(Barry, Elle Greenwich)	The Jelly Beans	#9 Black Singles #9 Pop Singles	2:45
15	"Dream Baby"	(Sonny Bono)	Cher	—	2:59
16	"Baby It's You"	(Burt Bacharach, Hal David, B. Williams)	The Shirelles	#3 Black Singles #8 Pop Singles	2:40
17	"Give Him a Great Big Kiss"	(Morton)	The Shangri-Las	#18 Pop Singles	2:12
18	"I Can't Let Go"	(Al Gorgoni, Chip Taylor)	Evie Sands	—	2:08

=== The Best of the Girl Groups, Volume 2 ===
#	Title	Composer	Performer	Chart Position	Time
1	"My Boyfriend's Back"	(Bob Feldman, Jerry Goldstein, Richard Gottehrer)	The Angels	#2 Black Singles #1 Pop Singles	2:39
2	"Sweet Talkin' Guy"	(Elliot Greenberg, Doug Morris)	The Chiffons	#10 Pop Singles	2:27
3	"The Loco-Motion"	(Goffin, King)	Little Eva	#1 Black Singles #1 Pop Singles	2:27
4	"A Lover's Concerto"	(Sandy Linzer, Denny Randell)	The Toys	#4 Black Singles #2 Pop Singles	2:42
5	"The Kind of Boy You Can't Forget"	(Barry, Greenwich)	The Raindrops	#27 Black Singles #17 Pop Singles	2:11
6	"You Don't Know"	(Barry, Greenwich, Morton)	Ellie Greenwich	—	3:17
7	"Chains"	(Goffin, King)	The Cookies	#17 Black Singles #6 Pop Singles	2:32
8	"Popsicles and Icicles"	(David Gates)	The Murmaids	#2 Adult Contemporary #3 Pop Singles	2:33
9	"The One You Can't Have"	(Brian Wilson)	The Honeys	—	2:00
10	"Tell Him"	(Bert Russell)	The Exciters	#5 Black Singles #4 Pop Singles	2:39
11	"Don't Say Nothin' Bad (About My Baby)"	(Goffin, King)	The Cookies	#3 Black Singles #7 Pop Singles	2:45
12	"I Met Him on a Sunday (Ronde-Ronde)"	(Doris Coley, Addie Harris, Beverley Lee, Shirley Owens)	The Shirelles	#49 Pop Singles	2:16
13	"Wonderful Summer"	(Perry Botkin, Jr., Gil Garfield)	Robin Ward	#23 Black Singles #14 Pop Singles	2:29
14	"It Might As Well Rain Until September"	(Goffin, King)	Carole King	#22 Pop Singles	2:25
15	"You Don't Have to Be a Baby to Cry"	(Bob Merrill, Terry Shand)	The Caravelles	#2 Adult Contemporary #3 Pop Singles	2:02
16	"Easier Said Than Done"	(Larry Huff, William Linton)	The Essex	#1 Black Singles #1 Pop Singles	2:12
17	"I Love How You Love Me"	(Larry Kolber, Barry Mann)	The Paris Sisters	#5 Pop Singles	2:09
18	"Johnny Get Angry"	(Hal David, Sherman Edwards, Donald Meyer)	Joanie Sommers	#7 Pop Singles	2:32

== Personnel ==
=== Performance ===
- The Ad Libs – performer
  - Hugh Harris
  - Danny Austin
  - Norman Donegan
  - Mary Ann Thomas
  - Dave Watt
  - Michael Powers
- The Angels – performer
  - Barb Allbut
  - Phyllis "Jiggs" Allbut
  - Peggy Santiglia
  - Linda Jansen
- The Caravelles – performer
  - Andrea Simpson
  - Lois Wilkinson
- Cher – performer
- The Chiffons – performer
  - Patricia Bennett
  - Judy Craig
  - Barbara Lee Jones
  - Sylvia Peterson
- Claudine Clark – performer
- The Cookies – performer
  - Margie Hendrix
  - Dorothy Jones
  - Ethel "Earl-Jean" McCrea
  - Patricia Lyles
  - Margaret Ross
- Skeeter Davis – performer
- The Dixie Cups – performer
  - Barbara Anne Hawkins
  - Rosa Lee Hawkins
  - Joan Marie Johnson
  - Dale Mickle
- The Essex – performer
  - Rodney Taylor
  - Rudolph Johnson
  - Anita Humes
  - Walter Vickers
  - Billy Hill
- Betty Everett – performer
- The Exciters – performer
  - Carol Johnson
  - Skip McPhee
  - Ronnie Pace
  - Brenda Reid
  - Lillian Walker
  - Sylvia Wilbur
  - Herb Rooney
- Ellie Greenwich – performer
- The Honeys – performer
  - Ginger Blake
  - Diane Rovell
  - Marilyn Rovell
  - Barbara Rovell
- The Jaynetts – performer
  - Yvonne Bushnell
  - Ethel Davis
  - Ada Ray
  - Johnnie Louise Richardson
  - Mary Sue Wells
  - Zelma Sanders
- The Jelly Beans – performer
  - Charles Thomas
  - Alma Brewer
  - Elyse Herbert
  - Maxine Herbert
  - Diane Taylor
- Carole King – performer
- Little Eva – performer
- The Murmaids – performer
  - Carol Fischer
  - Terry Fischer
  - Sally Gordon
- The Paris Sisters – performer
  - Albeth Paris
  - Priscilla Paris
- The Raindrops – performer
  - Ellie Greenwich
  - Jeff Barry
- Evie Sands – performer
- The Shangri-Las – performer
  - Marge Ganser
  - Mary Anne Ganser
  - Betty Weiss
  - Mary Weiss
- The Shirelles – performer
  - Doris Coley
  - Addie Harris
  - Beverley Lee
  - Shirley Owens
- Joanie Sommers – performer
- The Toys – performer
  - June Montiero
  - Barbara Parritt
  - Barbara Harris
- Robin Ward – performer

=== Production ===
- Sevie Bates – design
- Irwin Chusid – liner notes
- Geoff Gans – art direction
- Bill Inglot – producer, transfers, digital preparation
- Michael Ochs – photography
- Ken Perry – transfers, digital preparation
- Gary Stewart – compilation
