= Sonic's Rendezvous Band (album) =

Box set by Sonic's Rendezvous Band
- Released: 2006
- Recorded: 1975–1979
- Genres: Hard rock, Detroit rock, proto-punk
- Length: 348:03
- Label: Easy Action

Sonic's Rendezvous Band chronology
City Slang (2000)	Sonic's Rendezvous Band (2006)	Masonic Temple, Detroit 1978 (2007)

Professional ratings
Review scores
Source	Rating
Allmusic	link

Sonic's Rendezvous Band is a 2006 release box set by Sonic's Rendezvous Band under the UK label Easy Action. The remaining band members contributed to the box as well as Fred "Sonic" Smith's estate. The Box includes three previously unreleased live shows, the previous release Sweet Nothing in its entirety, several tracks from the City Slang release, a collection of basement tapes and other live material, as well as the studio recorded single "City Slang" and its intended b-side "Electrophonic Tonic".

== Controversy ==
David Fricke, Senior Editor of Rolling Stone, stated in the review of this box set that it "comes with its own controversy" over whether it was approved by all involved. Record label Easy Action asserts on its Web site that the release was approved by the surviving band members and by Fred Smith's wife and children. The release is also advertised in Scott Morgan's website. Fricke added: "I'm not taking sides. I just want as much of the best of this band as I can get, in good faith and quality. Right now, this is what I have. And I am playing it. Loud".

However, the band's ex-road manager's website states that it wasn't approved at all, neither by band members nor by the heirs of Fred Smith. The statements, made by Freddie Brooks, disregard the box set as a "fraudulent release" (sic). Brooks said his own website would be re-launched in October 2006, with re-issues of two previously-available CDs and a new three-disc box set, but this has failed to materialise.

- Royalties have been paid to the artists & estates since the boxed set was issued. A personal spat between co producer the late Robert Matheu and said Brooks created unwanted drama and false accusations.

== Track listing ==
All tracks composed by Fred "Sonic" Smith; except where indicated

=== Disc 1 - Ann Arbor, 1975 ===
1. "Promised Land" (Chuck Berry)
2. "Earthy" (Scott Morgan)
3. "It's Alright"
4. "Mystically Yours" (Morgan)
5. "Keep on Hustlin’" (Morgan)
6. "Space Age Blues" (W.R Cooke)
7. "Do it Again"
8. "Hearts"
9. "I Believe to My Soul" (Ray Charles, Allan Learner)
10. "Let the Kids Dance" (Bo Diddley)
11. "Chungo of the Asphalt Jungle" (W.R Cooke)
12. "Goin’ Bye"
13. "Roberta" (Al Smith, John Vincent)

=== Disc 2 - Lamphere High School, Madison Heights, 1976 ===
1. "Dangerous" (Morgan)
2. "Asteroid B612" (Morgan)
3. "Hard Stoppin’"
4. "Irish Girl" (Morgan)
5. "Like a Rolling Stone" (Bob Dylan)
6. "Succeed" (Morgan)
7. "Cool Breeze" (Morgan)
8. "Song L"
9. "Slow Down (Take a Look)" (Morgan)

=== Disc 3 - Masonic Auditorium, Detroit, 1978 ===
1. "Electrophonic Tonic" (Morgan)
2. "Sweet Nothin’"
3. "Asteroid B-612" (Morgan)
4. "Gone with the Dogs"
5. "Love and Learn" (Morgan)
6. "Song L"
7. "City Slang"

=== Disc 4 - Second Chance, Ann Arbour, 1978 ===
1. "Dangerous" (Morgan)
2. "Getting There" (Morgan)
3. "Do it Again"
4. "Hearts"
5. "Love & Learn" (Morgan)
6. "Heart of Stone" (Mick Jagger, Keith Richards)
7. "Sweet Nothin’"
8. "Asteroid B-612" (Morgan)
9. "Song L"
10. "City Slang"

=== Disc 5 - Basement Tapes + Live Rarities ===
1. "Succeed (Morgan) Morgan's Basement '76
2. "Highjackin' Love" (Tony Hester, Richard "Popcorn" Wylie) Morgan's Basement '76
3. "Mystically Yours" (Morgan) Morgan's Basement '76
4. "Take A Look" (Morgan) Morgan's Basement '76
5. "Electrophonic Tonic" (Morgan) Morgan's Basement '76
6. "So Sincerely Yours"
7. "Dangerous" (Morgan)
8. "Earthy" (Morgan)
9. "Hearts (aka Detroit Tango)"
10. "Step By Step" (with Lenny Kaye)
11. "Party Lights" (Claudine Clark)
12. "Flight 505" (Jagger, Richards)
13. "Thrill" (Morgan)
14. "Goin Bye"
15. "Gone With The Dogs"

=== Disc 6 - The Best Stuff You Havent Heard ===
1. "Sweet Little Sixteen" (Chuck Berry)
2. "Clock With No Hands" (F. "Leadbelly" Smith)
3. "You're So Great"
4. "Sweet Nothin’" Executive Ballroom, Sterling Heights 1978 Jan
5. "Song L" Executive Ballroom, Sterling Heights 1978 Jan
6. "Love & Learn" (Morgan) Executive Ballroom, Sterling Heights 1978 Jan
7. "It's Alright"
8. "Empty Heart" (Nanker, Phelge) Live at the Second Chance in 1977
9. "American Boy"
10. "Sweet Nothin’" (Instrumental) Rehearsal
11. "Electrophonic Tonic" (Morgan) Studio
12. "City Slang" Studio
