= The Up =

American rock band

The Up (often styled as The UP) was an American rock band formed in Detroit, Michigan in early 1967. Along with fellow proto-punk bands the MC5 and The Stooges, The Up served as a "house band" for the Grande Ballroom in Detroit.

== Career ==
The original band line-up consisted of vocalist Frank Bach, guitarist Bob Rasmussen, bassist Gary Rasmussen, and drummer Vic Peraino, until he was soon replaced by drummer Scott Bailey in 1968. The band was closely related to the MC5, as both bands' members lived in White Panther Party founder John Sinclair's commune. In May 1968, Sinclair moved the commune to Ann Arbor, Michigan and both bands followed. The Up served as the opening act for the MC5 during a September 1968 show at the University of Michigan's Union Ballroom in Ann Arbor. This show was attended by Elektra Records A and R rep Danny Fields. Fields was impressed with both the MC5 and The Stooges (who were the concert's second act) and after discussion with Elektra president Jac Holzman, offered both bands contracts. The Up did not get signed to Elektra and unlike the MC5 and The Stooges, the band never received a major record label contract.

The Up continued to play gigs at the Grande Ballroom and other local venues. In 1969, the MC5 ended their association with John Sinclair and the White Panther Party; The Up took the place of the MC5 as the main musical outlet of the party's propaganda. The Up disbanded in 1973 and faded further into obscurity. In 1975, the band's bassist Gary Rasmussen joined Sonic's Rendezvous Band, a Detroit rock scene supergroup featuring former members of the MC5, The Stooges, The Up and The Rationals.

Gary continued playing full time with many bands and recorded with many. He toured the world with recording artists, Iggy Pop, Michael Katon, Alvin Youngblood Hart, Aaron White of Canyon Records and others. He can be found in over 19 recordings, a handful of Detroit rock documentaries in film and books. He also recommended with Patti and Fred Smith on her famous, 'Dream of Life" album of which the song, "Power To The People" is a song often heard as a battle cry to unite around the world.

In 1995, a retrospective album titled Killer Up! was released containing all of The Up's song recordings. The album contains all of the band's singles, songs from a recording session at Head Sound Studios in Ypsilanti, Michigan and several live tracks recorded at the Agora Ballroom in Columbus, Ohio in 1972. John Sinclair states in the album's liner notes that, "It's common to name the MC5 and the Stooges among the forefathers of what they call punk rock, but it was their associates in a third band, the Up, who could more accurately be identified as the real precursors of punk."

== Discography ==
Singles

- "Just Like an Aborigine" / "Hassan I Sabbah" (1970) (Sundance 22190)
- "Free John Now!" / "Prayer for John Sinclair" (1971) (Rainbow 22191)

Compilations

- Killer Up! (1969-1972) CD / 10” LP (1995) (Total Energy NER3002 / NER3002/10)
- Rising CD / DVD (2010) (Easy Action CPSSPCD002, Applebush Records CPSSPCD002)
- "Just Like An Aborigine"
  - Michigan Mixture, Vol. 1 (1990)
  - Let 'Em Have It! Vol. 1 (1995)
  - A Square (Of Course): The Story of Michigan's Legendary A-Square Records (2008)
  - A² - An A-Square Compilation (2018)
- "Hassan I Sabbah"
  - Michigan Mixture, Vol. 1 (1990)
- "Come On"
  - Motor City's Burnin' (1998)
- "Long Hard Road" (as "The Uprising")
  - Motor City's Burnin' (1998)
- "Sisters, Sisters (Sisters Rising)"
  - Dirty Water: The Birth Of Punk Attitude (2010)
