= Hey Now (Lesley Gore song) =

Single by Lesley Gore

from the album Girl Talk
- B-side: "Sometimes I Wish I Were a Boy"
- Released: September 29, 1964
- Recorded: 1964
- Genre: Pop; R&B
- Label: Mercury Records
- Songwriter(s): Sonny Gordon
- Producer(s): Quincy Jones

Lesley Gore singles chronology
"Maybe I Know" (1964)	"Hey Now" (1964)	"Look of Love" (1964)

"Hey Now" is a song by American recording artist Lesley Gore. It was released as the second single from her fourth studio album, Girl Talk. The song was a commercial disappointment, becoming Gore's first single not to enter the top 40 on the Billboard Hot 100, peaking at number 76. The B-side, "Sometimes I Wish I Were a Boy," also drew attention.

== Background and release ==
"Hey Now" was released in September 1964 as the follow-up to Gore's hit "Maybe I Know." Considered to be markedly different from Gore's previous singles production-wise, the song bore more of an R&B influence, and was expected by Mercury Records to become a crossover hit for Gore.

Though it was released only as a B-side, "Sometimes I Wish I Were a Boy" attracted attention, drawing criticism for its misogynistic lyrics. Gore reportedly hated the B-side, feeling it went against the feminist image she'd managed to earn with earlier, forward-thinking singles like "You Don't Own Me," but agreed to record the song in exchange for some studio time in which she could record whatever she wished. The songs she recorded during this time have not survived, as her label felt they weren't commercially viable.

Gore performed "Hey Now" at the TAMI Show.

== Reception ==
=== Critical ===
Critical reception to the song was generally positive. In a single review for Billboard, DJ Eddie Clark called the song "very commercial" and noted the song's "hand-clappin' rock beat." Cash Box described it as "a tantalizing, multi-voiced blues-jazz-flavored rock-a-cha-cha" that should keep Gore's chain of hits intact. In 1999, Kathleen Hanna of Bikini Kill mentioned that she would include the song on one of her mix-tapes if she could.

=== Commercial ===
The song wasn't as well received commercially, becoming Gore's first chart flop. It peaked at number 76 on the Billboard Hot 100, and was her first single to fail to enter the top 40. it remained her worst-performing single until "I Won't Love You Anymore (Sorry)", released in 1965, peaked at number 80 on the Hot 100. Despite its controversy, "Sometimes I Wish I Were a Boy" gained airplay as well and became popular separate from "Hey Now." It entered the Hot 100 as a standalone single and peaked at number 86.

== Charts ==
"Hey Now"

Chart (1964)	Peak position
Canada RPM	33
US Billboard Hot 100	76

"Sometimes I Wish I Were a Boy"

Chart (1964)	Peak position
Canada CHUM Chart	36
US Billboard Hot 100	86

== Personnel ==
Adapted from 7" sleeve and You Don't Own Me: The Life and Times of Lesley Gore by Trevor Tolliver.

Vocals

- Lesley Gore

Songwriting

For "Hey Now"

- Sonny Gordon

For "Sometimes I Wish I Were a Boy"

- John Gluck, Jr.
- Steve Donroy

Production

- Quincy Jones

Arrangements

- Claus Ogerman
