= Leader of the Pack (musical) =

1984 American musical

- Original Cast Album
- Music: Ellie Greenwich
- Lyrics: Ellie Greenwich; Jeff Barry; Phil Spector; Shadow Morton; Jeff Kent; Ellen Foley
- Book: Anne Beatts
- Basis: The life of Ellie Greenwich
- Productions: 1984 Off-Broadway; 1985 Broadway

Leader of the Pack is a 1984 American jukebox musical based on the life and music of singer/songwriter Ellie Greenwich. The musical tells the story of Greenwich's career and personal life from the 1950s to the 1980s, using songs written or co-written by Greenwich, along with Jeff Barry, Phil Spector, George "Shadow" Morton, Jeff Kent, and Ellen Foley. The musical was based on an original concept by Melanie Mintz, and the book (referred to as the "liner notes") was written by Anne Beatts, with additional material by Jack Heifner.

The musical had a brief off-Broadway run in 1984, followed by a 120-performance Broadway run in 1985. The Broadway production had a lengthy preview period, during which the musical was retooled and much of the spoken dialogue was cut, turning Leader of the Pack into more of a revue. In both productions, the young Ellie was played by Dinah Manoff, while Greenwich herself appeared as the older Ellie. Annie Golden and Darlene Love, both of them Greenwich's real-life friends and collaborators, also appeared as themselves; Love was the original 1960s recording artist of some of the songs heard in the musical.

== Background ==
Leader of the Pack celebrates the life and times of the Brooklyn-born Greenwich, whose doo-wop sounds skyrocketed to the top of the pop charts in the early to mid-1960s. Beatts' "liner notes" serve as the book that link the songs and provide a look into the songwriter's professional triumphs and personal misfortunes.

== Production history ==
The initial presentation of Leader of the Pack: The Songs of Ellie Greenwich (as it originally was titled), with a cast of six, had a brief run at Greenwich Village's The Bottom Line in the winter of 1984. After 53 previews that began on February 21, 1985, the much-expanded production, boasting a cast of nineteen directed and choreographed by Michael Peters, opened on April 8, 1985, at the Ambassador Theatre, where it ran for 120 performances, closing on July 21. Frank Rich, reviewing the show in The New York Times, called it an "embarrassment" and later wrote that upon closing, the show's producers engaged each other in litigation that "entertained Broadway for far longer than their show had." The production was nominated for the Tony Award for Best Musical, but lost to Big River.

Leader of the Pack was unlike other shows on Broadway at the time. Though it ran in two acts, it was without an intermission and had a duration of 90 minutes.

Leader of the Pack is a popular choice for high school and amateur productions, which Ellie Greenwich frequently managed and oversaw until her death in August 2009.

=== 2000 U.S. Tour ===
A major U.S. tour was produced in 2000–2001, with new arrangements, orchestrations and musical direction by Nathan Hurwitz, directed by Kurt Stamm, choreography by Scott Wise. The cast included: Shoshana Bean, Brenda Braxton, Dianna Bush, Todd DuBail, Duane Martin Foster, Angela Garrison, Amy Goldberger, David Josefsberg, Joe Machuta, Ric Ryder, Denise Summerford, Jewel Tompkins, Ashley Howard Wilkinson.

One reviewer wrote, "Brenda Braxton shows her stuff in "The Sunshine After the Rain," and Angela Garrison does well with her numbers, including, notably, "The First Time." When they finally throw a bone to the men, the guys make the most of it. Ric Ryder and Todd DuBail carry their songs effortlessly. They do have a fine orchestra to work with, and the band, led by Nathan Hurwitz, gets better as the songs get richer."

== Synopsis ==
=== Act 1 ===
Darlene Love, serving as a narrator, welcomes us to the 1980s and the still-present popularity of songs from the 1960s ("Be My Baby"). Darlene then takes us back to a simpler time, the 1960s, and the music of that period as well ("Wait 'til My Bobby Gets Home"). Enter Ellie Greenwich, a teenage girl living in Levittown, New York. She dreams of her own musical success, but is sidelined by her mother who wishes for her to pursue a degree in education. ("A…My Name Is Ellie"). In Ellie's spare time, she formed a trio with her two best friends, Shelley and Mickey, called the Jivettes. The Jivettes are given a chance to record a single at the Brill Building, which they believe could be their big break. ("Jivette Boogie Beat") Fast forward a few years later where Ellie, now finished with school, attempts to get job writing at the Brill Building. There she meets a fellow writer, Jeff Barry, and Gus Sharkey, a music producer (in the vein of Phil Spector). Despite skepticism from Gus, Ellie writes and records her first hit single. ("Why Do Lovers Break Each Other's Hearts?") At an office party celebrating her hit single, Ellie and Jeff meet again and begin flirting with each other. ("Today I Met The Boy I'm Gonna Marry") The office party culminates into a huge dance party, with each side singing about the opposite sex ("I Wanna Love Him So Bad/Do Wah Diddy"). Ellie and her friends reflect on Ellie's first date with Jeff and what their future holds. ("And Then He Kissed Me") On their second date, Ellie believes her and Jeff are going all the way, but Jeff's intention was only to co-write music with her. ("Hanky Panky") Jeff and Ellie get engaged despite objections, ("Not Too Young To Get Married") and they elope a few months later. ("Chapel Of Love"). Jeff and Ellie are now romantically involved as well as professionally, and they are an unstoppable team of songwriters. They continue to crank out hit songs for Darlene Love, The Crystals, The Shangri-Las, and Connie Francis, with much success. ("Songwriting Medley") and produce a new song for The Ronettes that nets the pair much acclaim. ("Baby, I Love You"). Jeff and Ellie are enjoying their newfound fame and wealth, but things begin to take a rocky turn when Jeff begins to venture off and working solo and not with Ellie, and tensions rise between the two. ("Leader Of The Pack")

=== Act 2 ===
Jeff and Ellie are in the midst of receiving numerous awards for their work, but it has become obvious their marriage is on the rocks. Jeff wishes to settle down while they are at the top and start a family, while Ellie wishes to continue working. This culminates into Jeff breaking off the marriage since he and Ellie want different things. ("Look Of Love") Ellie, still in love with Jeff and heartbroken over the separation, refuses to let anybody know that the marriage dissolved. ("Christmas (Baby, Please Come Home)"). A few years have passed and Ellie is still writing music. She happens upon Jeff in the Brill Building one day when he arrives from Los Angeles on business. Ellie candidly admits how she misses him and wants to reconcile. However, Jeff is already engaged and settled in Los Angeles, much to Ellie’s shock. ("I Can Hear Music") Not being able to cope with her personal tragedies, Ellie spirals into a nervous breakdown. ("Rock Of Rages") After a brief flash-forward into the 1980s, we see a renewed adult Ellie Greenwich who is in control of her life. ("Keep It Confidential") As she teaches a master class, she reflects back on some of her most famous work. ("Da Doo Ron Ron") However, she is also reminded of her former life and husband when telling about another one of her works. ("What A Guy") Ellie realizes that she and Jeff's issues are a thing of the past and that her life is more successful than ever before. ("Maybe I Know") Ellie reunites with her equally successful friends, Darlene Love and Annie Golden, and gives Darlene a chance to sing a song that was originally hers, but reassigned to Tina Turner. ("River Deep, Mountain High"). After reflecting on the life and times of their friendship, Ellie realizes that, through triumph and turmoil, she did make it in the end. ("We're Gonna Make It After All")

== Cast ==
- Dinah Manoff - Young Ellie Greenwich (1960s)
- Ellie Greenwich - Herself (1980s)
- Patrick Cassidy - Jeff Barry
- Annie Golden - Herself
- Darlene Love - Herself
- Dennis Bailey - Gus Sharkey (based on Phil Spector)
- Jasmine Guy - Mickey
- Barbara Yeager - Shelley
- Gina Taylor - Gina
- Zora Rasmussen - Ellie's Mom
- Pattie Darcy - Lounge Singer
- Keith McDaniel - Lead Dancer/ Dance Captain

== Song list ==
Act I

- Overture - Orchestra
- "Be My Baby" - Annie and Girls
- "Wait 'til My Bobby Gets Home" - Darlene & Company
- "A . . . My Name Is Ellie"+ - Young Ellie
- "Jivette Boogie Beat"+ - Young Ellie, Shelley & Mickey
- "Why Do Lovers Break Each Other's Hearts?" - Darlene
- "Today I Met the Boy I'm Gonna Marry" - Darlene
- "I Wanna Love Him So Bad" - Young Ellie & Girls
- "Do Wah Diddy Diddy" - Jeff & Guys
- "And Then He Kissed Me" - Young Ellie, Shelley & Mickey
- "Hanky Panky" - Jeff & Guys
- "Not Too Young To Get Married" - Darlene & Girls
- "Chapel Of Love" - Company
- "Songwriting Medley"+ - Ellie, Jeff, Gus Sharkey & Company
- "Baby I Love You" - Annie and Girls
- "Leader of the Pack" - Annie and Company

Act II

- "The Look of Love" - Lounge Singer
- "Christmas (Baby Please Come Home)" - Darlene & Company
- "I Can Hear Music" - Annie & Guys
- "Rock of Rages"+ - Young Ellie
- "Keep It Confidential" - Gina
- "Da Doo Ron Ron" - Adult Ellie & Guys
- "What a Guy" - Adult Ellie & Company
- "Maybe I Know" - Adult Ellie
- "River Deep, Mountain High" - Darlene & Company
- "We're Gonna Make It After All"+ - Adult Ellie, Young Ellie, Darlene, Annie & Company

+ - Song was specifically written for the show

- The show ran as one entire act while on Broadway. It was split into two acts for regional and high school productions of the show.

"Keep It Confidential" was omitted from the show after 9 regular performances on April 15, 1985, since it "didn't fit in the show well". It was re-added to the show on June 13, 1985, in a different spot that the producers decided was fitting for it.

A 2-LP original cast recording was released by Elektra Records. This record not only contained the music from the show, but also the intermittent dialogue between songs (most of which were lead-ons to the next song).

== Awards and nominations ==
=== Original Broadway production ===
Year	Award	Category	Nominee	Result
1985	Tony Award	Best Musical		Nominated
