= Boys, Boys, Boys =

Studio album by Lesley Gore
- Released: April 1964
- Recorded: March 30, 1963; March 4–28, 1964
- Studio: Bell Sound Studios, A&R Recording, New York City
- Genre: Pop rock
- Length: 28:14
- Label: Mercury
- Producer: Quincy Jones

Lesley Gore chronology
| Lesley Gore Sings of Mixed-Up Hearts (1963) | Boys, Boys, Boys (1964) | Girl Talk (1964) |

Singles from Boys, Boys, Boys
- 1. "That's the Way Boys Are"/"That The Way the Ball Bounces" Released: March 9 1964; 2. "I Don't Wanna Be a Loser"/"It's Gotta Be You" Released: May 5 1964

Professional ratings
Review scores
| Source | Rating |
|---|---|
| Record Mirror | 4/5 stars |

Boys, Boys, Boys is the third studio album by American singer-songwriter Lesley Gore. The album was released in April, 1964.

== Track listing ==
Side one
| No. | Title | Writer(s) | Length |
|---|---|---|---|
| 1. | "That's the Way Boys Are" | Mark Barkan, Ben Raleigh |
| 2. | "Boys" | Paul Anka |
| 3. | "It's Gotta Be You" | Mark Barkan, Claus Ogerman |
| 4. | "Something Wonderful" | Oscar Hammerstein II, Richard Rodgers |
| 5. | "You Name It" | Norman Blagman, Edna Lewis |
| 6. | "Danny" | Paul Anka |

Side two
| No. | Title | Writer(s) | Length |
|---|---|---|---|
| 7. | "I Don't Wanna Be a Loser" | Mark Barkan, Ben Raleigh |
| 8. | "That's the Way the Ball Bounces" | Marvin Hamlisch, Howard Liebling |
| 9. | "Leave Me Alone" | Lesley Gore |
| 10. | "Don't Call Me" | John Madara, David White |
| 11. | "I'll Make It Up to You" | Edna Lewis, Gloria Shayne |
| 12. | "I'm Coolin', No Foolin'" | Lesley Gore, Sydney Shaw |

== Charts ==
| Chart (1964) | Peak position |
|---|---|
| US Billboard Top LPs | 127 |
