= Scott Morgan (musician) =

American rock and roll and soul musician

- Born: Ann Arbor, Michigan, United States
- Genres: Rock, garage rock, rock and roll, soul, blue-eyed soul
- Occupations: Musician, songwriter, producer
- Instruments: Vocals, guitar
- Years active: 1962–present
- Labels: A2 Records, American Ruse Records, Career Records, Easy Action, Schoolkids, Revenge Records, Rouge Records
- Website: Official Website

Scott Morgan is an American rock and roll and soul musician, most known for his work with the Sonic's Rendezvous Band, the Rationals, The Solution as well as his solo work.

He was born in Ann Arbor, Michigan, United States.

== Recording career ==
=== The Rationals ===
Morgan's first band was The Rationals. In the early years the band went through several lineup changes but in the end, the lineup consisted of Scott Morgan (guitars and vocals), Steve Correll (guitars), Terry Trabandt (bass guitar) and Bill Figg (drums). The band started out playing instrumental blues and surf-inspired music but in 1964 the band played a cover of Barrett Strong's "Money", which was noticed by manager Jeep Holland. The band soon started to record their music and started touring. In 1968 the MC5 opened for the band when the Five were recording their debut live LP. By the late 60's there was tension building within the band and both Iggy Pop and Scott Asheton were considered as replacements for drummer Bill Figg, and Terry Trabandt was supposedly considering leaving the band. In 1969 the band recorded their self-titled LP which was released in 1970. After an argument at the Embassy Hotel Lounge in Windsor, Ontario, the band finally decided to break up. Morgan then briefly regrouped with a band called Guardian Angel with his brother David on drums and Wayne "Tex" Gabriel on guitar.

=== Sonic's Rendezvous Band ===
After Guardian Angel Morgan joined up with former MC5 guitarist Fred "Sonic" Smith, drummer Scott Asheton of The Stooges and "Lightnin'" Gary Rasmussen in the late 1970s to form the Detroit rock supergroup Sonic's Rendezvous Band. The band only officially recorded in a studio once, which resulted in the "City Slang" single (self-released on their own label, Orchid). The only other studio track to have been released from the session is "Electrophonic Tonic," which was considered as a b-side for the "City Slang" single. However, for reasons now unknown, it was decided that the single would have a stereo version of "City Slang" on the a-side and a mono version on the b-side. By 1980 the band decided to go their separate ways. In the ensuing years, many bootlegs from the band's high energy live shows at venues such as Detroit's Bookies and Ann Arbor's Second Chance were passed around by fans. Due to the lack of recorded material, the band remained a mystery to many. Later, many of the bootlegged recordings would be remastered and released by Mack Aborn Rhythmic Arts in 1999.

=== The Scott Morgan band and Scott's Pirates ===
During the 1980s, Morgan formed the Scott Morgan Band, which occasionally played in the Ann Arbor/Detroit area. In 1988, his band released an album entitled "Rock Action," which found Morgan (guitar and vocals) backed up by ex-Sonic's Rendezvous bassist Gary Rasmussen and ex-Stooges drummer Scott (aka "Rock Action") Asheton. The trio later toured in America under the name Scotts Pirates, which took its name from Morgan's song "Pirate Music," and released their self-titled album included two tracks from the Rock Action. Rock Action was followed up in 1996 with the record Revolutionary Means in 1996. The same year Scott teamed up with Wayne Kramer of the MC5 and Deniz Tek under the name Dodge Main. The band played live together around the midwest and recorded an eponymous album. One of the shows was recorded however it has not yet been released. In 1998 Morgan teamed up with Swedish rock band The Hellacopters on their U.S. tour which led to the EP Scott Morgan and The Hellacopters.

=== The Hydromatics and The Solution ===
The Hydromatics was formed by Hellacopters frontman Nicke Andersson (a.k.a. Nick Royale), Tony Slug and Theo Brouwer of Amsterdam punk band Nitwitz. The band was formed during The Hellacopters 1998 tour in America and in 1999 Andersson and Morgan meet up with in Amsterdam with Slug and Brouwer. The band rehearsed for six days before heading out and doing three small clubgigs in Amsterdam and later record their debut album Parts Unknown. During a six-week tour the band also recorded a live CD before Andersson had to leave the band due to his commitments with his other band. He was soon replaced by Andy Frost and in 2001 the second album Powerglide was released and in 2003 the group was disbanded.

In 2001 Scott Morgan and Deniz Tek toured extensively in France and Italy with members of the group "Sonic Assassin" (Romano Pasquini, Pippo Pasquini, and Stefano Constantini). A live album resulted, under the name "3 Assassins".

After the demise of The Hydromatics Morgan once again teamed up with Nicke Andersson in 2004 to form what was initially called Soulmover, but later renamed The Solution. The group recorded their debut album Communicate! in Sweden with an all-Swedish line up of musicians, which was followed by a short tour in the Nordic region. Communicate! was followed up with the record Will Not Be Televised in 2007. Officially the band is still active but due to all of the different members involvement finding an opportunity to work together is very difficult.

== Discography ==
The Rationals

- The Rationals
- Temptation 'bout to Get Me

Sonic's Rendezvous Band

- City Slang
- Sweet Nothing
- Sonic's Rendezvous Band (Box Set)
- Masonic Temple, Detroit 1978

The Scott Morgan Band

- Rock Action

Scots Pirates

- Scots Pirates
- Revolutionary Means

Scott Morgan

- S/T
- Three Chords and a Cloud of Dust (3-CD Box Set)
- "Rough & Ready"

The Hydromatics

- Dangerous / Heaven 45
- Parts Unknown
- Powerglide
- R.I.P. rnr (Ox fanzine compilation)
- Soulbone on Live at the Subsonic, Vol. 1
- Do It Again
- Live 10
- The Earth Is Shaking (2007)

The Solution

- Communicate!
- I Have to Quit You / I'll Be Around
- My Mojo Ain't Workin' No More
- Will Not Be Televised
- "She Messed Up My Mind" (live) (b/w Powertrane - "Pearl") - 45 rpm, 7" single

Powertrane

- "Beyond the Sound" (b/w Sweet Justice - "Blood & Alcohol") - 45 rpm, 7" single
- Beyond the Sound (full-length CD)
- "Pearl" (b/w The Solution - "She Messed Up My Mind" (live)) - 45 rpm, 7" single

Dodge Main

- Dodge Main (Total Energy)

Scott Morgan and Deniz Tek

- Three Assassins (Career Records)

Other work

- Scott Morgan and the Hellacopters
