= Keith McDaniel =

American dancer

Keith McDaniel (March 29, 1956, Chicago — January 2, 1995, Los Angeles) was an American dancer who was principal artist with the Alvin Ailey American Dance Theater and on Broadway. He also appeared in music videos and on television and film.

== Life and career ==
Born in Chicago, McDaniel was the son of Vernon McDaniel. A principal artist with the Alvin Ailey American Dance Theater from 1975 through 1983, he was a favorite dancer of Ailey who created several works to feature him. He toured internationally with the Ailey company.

After leaving the Ailey company in 1983, McDaniel moved to Los Angeles to work in television in film. His credits include appearances in the films Beaches (1988), Ladykillers (1988), Bert Rigby, You're a Fool (1989),Great Balls of Fire (1989), Bad Influence (1990), Death Becomes Her (1992), and Basic Instinct (1992), and on the television programs The Tracey Ullman Show and Moonlighting. He also appeared as a dancer in multiple Academy Award shows and appeared in music videos with Paula Abdul, Brenda Russell, Tina Marie and Glenn Frey.

McDaniel returned to New York twice to appear on Broadway during his career. He was a lead dancer and dance captain in the original Broadway musical productions of Leader of the Pack (1985) and Kiss of the Spider Woman (1993–1994); the latter of which featured him as a dance partner to Chita Rivera.

He died of AIDS on January 2, 1995. His partner at the time of his death was Matt Tapscott.
