= Communicate! =

Studio album by The Solution
- Released: June 15, 2004
- Recorded: Atlantis, Stockholm, Sweden
- Genre: Soul; Rock
- Label: Wild Kingdom; Sweet Nothing
- Producer: Nick Royale

The Solution chronology
Communicate! (2004)	Will Not Be Televised (2007)

Communicate! is the first studio album by soul band The Solution formed by Nicke Andersson and Scott Morgan recorded at Atlantis Studio and mixed in Polar Studios. The album was released in 2004 and was followed up with Will Not Be Televised in 2008.

== Track listing ==
No.	Title	Writer(s)	Length
1.	"Get on Back"	Bailey, Morgan	2:20
2.	"I Have to Quit You"	Andersson	2:51
3.	"My Mojo Aint Workin No More"	Andersson	3:52
4.	"Would You Change Your Mind"	Andersson	3:11
5.	"Top of the Stairs"	Morgan	3:45
6.	"Widow Wemberley"	White	2:57
7.	"Phoenix"	Andersson	3:11
8.	"She Messed Up My Mind"	Andersson, Morgan	4:17
9.	"Must Be Love Coming Down"	Mayfield	2:57
10.	"Words"	Andersson, Morgan	3:58
11.	"End of the Day"	Morgan	3:01
12.	"Soulmover"	Morgan	3:03

== Personnel ==
- Scott Morgan – lead vocals, guitar, harmonica
- Nicke Andersson – production, drums, percussion, guitar, backing vocals
- Henke "The Duke of Honk" Wilden – piano, organ
- Jim Heneghan – bass guitar
- Mattias Hellberg – rhythm guitar, lead guitar
- Linn Segolson – backing vocals
- Clarisse Muvemba – backing vocals
- Cecilia Gärding – backing vocals
- Jennifer Strömberg – backing vocals
- Linnea Sporre – backing vocals
- Gustav Bendt – saxofon
- Emil Strandberg – trumpet
- Robert Dahlqvist – lead guitar on Soulmover
- Henrik Jonsson – mastering
- Janne Hansson – recording engineer
- Ronny Lahti – recording engineer
