= Twister Alley =

- Origin: Arkansas, United States
- Genres: Country
- Years active: 1987–1994
- Label: Mercury
- Members: Shellee Morris, Steve Goins, Amy Hitt, Randy Loyd, Lance Blythe, Kevin King

Twister Alley was an American country music group formed in 1987. The band consisted of Shellee Morris, Amy Hitt, Steve Goins, Lance Blythe, Randy Loyd and Kevin King. They released one album on Mercury Nashville in 1993. Their highest charting single, "Nothing in Common But Love," peaked at No. 61 on the Billboard Hot Country Singles & Tracks chart.

== Twister Alley (1993) ==
=== Track listing ===
1. "Let It Be Love" (Deborah Allen, Mike Lawler, Rafe Van Hoy) - 4:06
2. "Pretty Thing" (Anna Lisa Graham, Lawler) - 4:02
3. "Nothing in Common But Love" (Donny Lowery, Craig Wiseman) - 3:10
4. "Dance" (Lawler, Tim Nichols, Zack Turner) - 3:19
5. "Young Love" (Rick Cartey, Carol Joyner) - 2:42
6. "Twister Alley" (Tim Alexander, Lawler, Nichols, Turner) - 3:07
7. "Redneck Ways (In the U.S.A.)" (Tony Colton, Lawler) - 4:16
8. "Billy Bill" (Dale Daniel, Lawler, Naomi Martin) - 2:50
9. "Shame on Me" (Buck Moore, Jerry Ward) - 2:20
10. "I'm Outta Here" (Lawler, Nichols, William Robinson) - 3:43
11. "Dance" (Lawler, Nichols, Turner) - 4:17
  - club mix

=== Singles ===
Year	Single	Peak chart positions	
Year	Single	US Country	CAN Country
1993	"Dance"	—	—
1993	"Nothing in Common but Love"	61	79
1994	"Young Love"	70	—
"—" denotes releases that did not chart

=== Music videos ===
Year	Video	Director
1993	"Dance"	Roger Pistole
1993	"Nothing in Common but Love"	Jeffrey Phillips
1994	"Young Love"	Thom Oliphant
