= He's Got the Power (song) =

1963 song by The Exciters

"He's Got the Power" is a song written by Ellie Greenwich and Tony Powers. it was first recorded by the American girl group The Exciters in 1963. It was released on United Artists Records and peaked at # 57 on the US Billboard Top 100. The recording was produced by Leiber, Stoller and the arrangement was by Teacho Wiltshire.

The exciters made a filmed version for the Scopitone, a 16mm film jukebox which was a precursor to later music videos.

The song was covered by the French girl group Les Gam's in 1963, in French, renamed "Il a le truc."

It was also sung by Sidney Flanigan in the opening scene of the movie Never Rarely Sometimes Always
