= Party Lights (Claudine Clark song) =

Single by Claudine Clark

from the album Party Lights
- A-side: "Disappointed"
- Released: May 1962
- Genre: R&B
- Length: 2:20
- Label: Chancellor
- Songwriter: Claudine Clark
- Producers: Bob Marcucci, Russ Faith

Claudine Clark singles chronology
"Angel of Happiness" (1958)	"Party Lights" (1962)	"Walkin' Through a Cemetery" (1962)

"Party Lights" is a song written and performed by Claudine Clark. It reached #3 on the U.S. R&B chart and #5 on the U.S. pop chart in 1962. It was featured on her 1962 album Party Lights.

The song was arranged by Russ Faith and produced by Faith and Bob Marcucci.

The song ranked #35 on Billboard magazine's Top 100 singles of 1962.

== Other versions ==
- Jackie Lee released a version of the song as a single in 1962 in the United Kingdom, but it did not chart.
- Dee Dee Sharp released a version of the song on her 1962 album All the Hits by Dee Dee Sharp.
- The Palace Guard released a version of the song as the B-side to their 1964 single "Saturdays Child".
- Sha Na Na released a version of the song on their 1975 album Sha Na Now.
- Sonic's Rendezvous Band released a version of the song on their 2006 compilation album Sonic's Rendezvous Band.
- Skid Roper released a version of the song on his 2010 album Rock and Roll Part 3.
- Peggy Sue released a version of the song on their 2012 album Peggy Sue Play the Songs of Scorpio Rising.

== In popular culture ==
- Clark's version was featured in the 1963 experimental short film Scorpio Rising.
