= California Nights (Lesley Gore album) =

1967 album by Lesley Gore

Studio album by Lesley Gore
- Released: February 1967
- Recorded: 1966–1967
- Studios: A&R Recording, New York City; Sunset Sound Recorders, Hollywood, Los Angeles
- Genres: Pop; rock
- Length: 25:28
- Label: Mercury
- Producers: Bob Crewe; Quincy Jones

Lesley Gore chronology
Lesley Gore Sings All About Love (1966)	California Nights (1967)	Lesley Gore Golden Hits, Vol. 2 (1968)

Singles from California Nights
- 1. "Off and Running"/"I Don't Care" Released: May 6, 1966; 2. "Treat Me Like a Lady"/"Maybe Now" Released: August 1966; 3. "California Nights"/"I'm Going Out (The Same Way I Came In)" Released: January 1967

California Nights is a 1967 album by Lesley Gore, the last of her seven albums released on the Mercury Records label. The title track on the album, California Nights, peaked at number 16 and was Gore's last top-20 hit. Bob Crewe produced seven of the tracks on the album, while Quincy Jones produced three. (Note: Jones produced the songs "Off and Running", "Lilacs and Violets", and "Cry Like a Baby", which was written by Ashford & Simpson) The album was reissued in 2015 as part of a compilation in both album and CD format by Ace Records, which included 15 bonus tracks from her Mercury catalogue.

Cash Box said of the single "Treat Me Like a Lady" that it is "a rhythmic, medium-paced bluesy ode about a gal who wants her boyfriend to pay her proper respect."

== Track listing ==
Side A

1. "California Nights" (Marvin Hamlisch, Howard Liebling) – 2:44
2. "Treat Me Like a Lady" (Bob Crewe, Gary Knight) – 2:56
3. "Bad" (Bob Crewe, Joel Hirschhorn, Al Kasha) – 2:46
4. "I'm Going Out (The Same Way I Came In)" (Bob Crewe, Gary Knight) – 2:33
5. "Maybe Now" (Lesley Gore, Michael Gore) (Note: Michael Gore, Lesley's younger brother, won the Oscar in 1981 for best original song for "Fame"; Lesley and Michael were also nominated that year for "Out Here on My Own" from Fame.) – 2:21

Side B

1. "Love Goes on Forever" (Bob Crewe, Gary Knight) – 3:00
2. "Off and Running" (Carole Bayer, Toni Wine) – 1:52
3. "Lilacs and Violets" (Fred Anisfield, Larry Weiss) – 2:07
4. "The Bubble Broke" (Bob Crewe, Raymond Bloodworth, L. Russell Brown) – 2:56
5. "Cry Like a Baby" (Jo Armstead, Ashford & Simpson) – 2:13

== Compilation album ==
California Nights

Compilation album by Lesley Gore
- Released: May 2015 (UK)
- Genres: Pop; rock
- Length: 59:43
- Label: Ace

Professional ratings
Review scores
Source	Rating
AllMusic	link

California Nights was released as a compilation album in both LP and CD format by Ace Records in May 2015 (UK) and in June 2015 (US). It includes the reissue of the ten tracks from the original 1967 album, plus fifteen bonus tracks from Gore's Mercury catalogue. The bonus tracks include ten tracks from the 1965 album All About Love, which preceded California Nights, two tracks from the 1965 album My Town, My Guy & Me, and three tracks from the 5-CD box set It's My Party, released in 1994.

Tracks 1 to 10 are from the original album California Nights (1967), tracks 11 and 12 are from the album My Town, My Guy & Me (1965), tracks 13 to 21 and 23 are from the album All About Love (1965) and tracks 22, 24 and 25 are from the It's My Party box set (1994).

Tracks from CDCHD 1439

1. "California Nights" (Marvin Hamlisch, Howard Liebling) – 2:44
2. "Treat Me Like a Lady" (Bob Crewe, Gary Knight) – 2:56
3. "Bad" (Bob Crewe, Joel Hirschhorn, Al Kasha) – 2:46
4. "I'm Going Out (The Same Way I Came In)" (Bob Crewe, Gary Knight) – 2:33
5. "Maybe Now" (Lesley Gore, Michael Gore) – 2:21
6. "Love Goes on Forever" (Bob Crewe, Gary Knight) – 3:00
7. "Off and Running" (Carole Bayer, Toni Wine) – 1:52
8. "Lilacs and Violets" (Fred Anisfield, Larry Weiss) – 2:07
9. "The Bubble Broke" (Bob Crewe, Raymond Bloodworth, L. Russell Brown) – 2:56
10. "Cry Like a Baby" (Jo Armstead, Ashford & Simpson) – 2:13
11. "My Town, My Guy, and Me" (Bob Elgin, Lesley Gore, Paul Kaufman) – 2:27
12. "Let Me Dream" (Teddy Randazzo, Lou Stallman, Bobby Weinstein) – 2:21
13. "Start the Party Again" (Artie Resnick, Kenny Young) – 2:15
14. "I Won't Love You Anymore (Sorry)" (Lesley Gore, Michael Gore) – 2:05
15. "I Just Can't Get Enough of You" (Jo Armstead, Ashford & Simpson) – 1:58
16. "To Know Him Is to Love Him" (Phil Spector) – 2:29
17. "Will You Love Me Tomorrow?" (Gerry Goffin, Carole King) – 2:18
18. "Only Last Night" (Barry Mason, Les Reed) – 2:35
19. "With Any Other Girl" (Shelly Coburn) – 2:19
20. "I Can Tell" (Steve Duboff, Artie Kornfeld) – 2:22
21. "We Know We're in Love" (Lesley Gore, Michael Gore) – 2:11
22. "Yeah, Yeah, Yeah (That Boy of Mine)" (Charles Koppelman, Artie Kornfeld, Don Rubin) – 2:06
23. "That's What I'll Do" (George Motola, Rickie Page) – 1:49
24. "Happiness Is Just Around the Corner" (Van McCoy) – 2:16
25. "Hold Me Tight" (Lesley Gore, Michael Gore) – 2:26
