= Will Not Be Televised =

Studio album by The Solution
- Released: 2007
- Studio: Atlantis, Stockholm, Sweden; Acetone, Stockholm, Sweden
- Genre: Soul; Rock
- Label: Wild Kingdom; Sound Pollution
- Producer: Nick Royale

The Solution chronology
Communicate! (2004)	Will Not Be Televised (2007)

Professional ratings
Review scores
Source	Rating
Allmusic	3.5/5 stars

Will Not Be Televised is the second full-length album by the soul band The Solution, recorded at Atlantis Studios and Acetone Studio in Stockholm. The album was released in 2007 on vinyl and in 2008 on CD.

== Track listing ==
No.	Title	Writer(s)	Length
1.	"You Gotta Come Down"	Andersson	3:25
2.	"Somebody"	Morgan	3:09
3.	"Had You Told It Like It Was (It Wouldn't Be Like It Is)"	Redd, Thompson	2:46
4.	"Pickin' Wild Mountain Berries"	McReed, Thomas	3:03
5.	"You Got What You Wanted"	Carson	3:46
6.	"You Never Liked Me Somehow"	Andersson	2:58
7.	"Happiness"	Morgan	2:59
8.	"Can't Stop Looking for My Baby"	Hamilton, McGraw, Wingate	2:22
9.	"Hijackin' Love"	Hester, Wylie	5:18
10.	"Heavy Makes You Happy (Sha-Na-Boom Boom)"	Barry, Bloom	3:38
11.	"Funky Fever"	Carter, Daniel, Hall, Wilson	2:51

== Personnel ==
- Scott Morgan – lead vocals, guitar, harmonica, percussion
- Nicke Andersson – production, drums, percussion, guitar, backing vocals
- Henke "The Duke of Honk" Wilden – piano, organ
- Jim Heneghan – bass guitar
- Mattias Hellberg – rhythm guitar, lead guitar
- Linn Segolson – backing vocals
- Clarisse Muvemba – backing vocals
- Cecilia Gärding – backing vocals
- Jennifer Strömberg – backing vocals
- Linnea Sporre – backing vocals
- Gustav Bendt – saxophone
- Emil Strandberg – trumpet
- Janne Hansson – recording engineer
- Michael Bork – recording engineer
- Stefan Boman – mixing
