= Girl Talk (Lesley Gore album) =

Studio album by Lesley Gore
- Released: October 1964
- Studios: A&R Recording, New York City
- Genres: Pop; rock
- Length: 28:33
- Label: Mercury
- Producer: Quincy Jones

Lesley Gore chronology
Boys, Boys, Boys (1964)	Girl Talk (1964)	My Town, My Guy & Me (1965)

Singles from Girl Talk
- 1. "Maybe I Know"/"Wonder Boy" Released: July 9, 1964; 2. "Hey Now"/"Sometimes I Wish I Were a Boy" Released: September 29, 1964; 3. "Look of Love"/"Little Girl Go Home" Released: December 2, 1964

Girl Talk is the fourth studio album by American singer Lesley Gore. The album, released in 1964, spawned several hit singles, including "Maybe I Know", "Hey Now", and "Look of Love". The album reached number 146 on the Billboard 200.

== Commercial performance ==
The album was less successful than its predecessors, stalling at number 146 on the US album chart. It did include two Top 40 hits, however: "Maybe I Know" and "Look of Love." "Maybe I Know" was also a Top 20 hit in the UK.

== Critical reception ==
Retrospectively, AllMusic awarded the album three-and-a-half stars, and though commenting that the singles are the highlights, concluded that the album is "certainly one of her better" albums.

== Track listing ==
Side one
No.	Title	Writer(s)	Length
1.	"Hey Now"	Sonny Gordon	2:17
2.	"Live and Learn"	William Carl, John Madara, David White	2:24
3.	"Say Goodbye"	Larry Marks	2:15
4.	"Look of Love"	Jeff Barry, Ellie Greenwich	2:02
5.	"You've Come Back"	Van McCoy	2:17
6.	"Maybe I Know"	Jeff Barry, Ellie Greenwich	2:37

Side two
No.	Title	Writer(s)	Length
7.	"Sometimes I Wish I Were a Boy"	Steve Donroy, John Gluck Jr.	2:05
8.	"Little Girl Go Home"	Manny Curtis, Frank Herve, Kelly Ross	2:44
9.	"I Died Inside"	Lesley Gore	2:51
10.	"Wonder Boy"	Jimmie Steward Jr., Sidney J. Wyche	2:18
11.	"Movin' Away"	Len Praverman	3:14
12.	"It's Just About That Time"	Van McCoy	3:00

CD Bonus tracks
No.	Title	Writer(s)	Length
13.	"Consolation Prize"	Edna Lewis, Gloria Shayne	2:03
14.	"After He Takes Me Home"	Günther Heigel, Gloria Shayne	2:01
15.	"Don't Deny It"		2:30
16.	"I Just Don't Know If I Can"	Carole Bayer, Lesley Gore	2:27
17.	"That's the Boy"	Barry Mann, Cynthia Weil	2:51
18.	"What's a Girl Supposed to Do"	Jeff Barry, Ellie Greenwich	2:24
19.	"I Cannot Hope for Anyone"	Enrico Ciacci, Lesley Gore, Giovanni Meccia	2:35
20.	"I Don't Care"	John Medora, David White	2:28
21.	"You Didn't Look 'Round"	Glen Stuart, Nola York	2:51
22.	"Baby That's Me"	Jackie DeShannon, Jack Nitzsche	2:38
23.	"No Matter What You Do"	Mike Post, Dick St. John	2:46
24.	"What Am I Gonna Do With You"	Gerry Goffin, Russ Titelman	3:13
25.	"A Girl in Love"	Lesley Gore	2:43
