= Young Love (1956 song) =

1956 popular song written by Ric Cartey and Carole Joyner

Single by Ric Cartey with the Jiva-Tones
- B-side: "Oooh-Eeee"
- Released: 1956
- Recorded: 1956 in Atlanta, Georgia
- Genre: Country
- Length: 2:28
- Label: Stars, Inc. (Atlanta, Georgia); RCA Victor (rest of the United States)
- Songwriters: Carole Joyner; Ric Cartey

"Young Love" is a song by the American rock band Ric Cartey with the Jiva-Tones. Cartey wrote the song with Carole Joyner, his girlfriend at the time. It was recorded on November 24, 1956, and released through Stars Inc. shortly after. It was released in 1956 by Stars Records as catalog number 539 and one month later by RCA Records as catalog number 47-6751.

The song became a hit several times over the years with three near-simultaneous versions released by Sonny James, Tab Hunter, and the Crew-Cuts in 1957, and was later covered with hit versions by Lesley Gore in 1965 and Donny Osmond in 1973. The recordings by James, Hunter and Osmond were all number-one hits: James's on the country and radio airplay charts, Hunter's on the Billboard Hot 100 Hunters version spent 7 weeks at number 1 in the U.K , and Osmond's on the UK Singles Chart.

== Sonny James version ==
The recording by American country singer Sonny James was released by Capitol Records as catalog number 3602. It first reached the Billboard chart on January 5, 1957. On the Disk Jockey chart, it peaked at No. 1; on the Country & Western Best Seller chart, also at No. 1; on the Juke Box chart, at No. 4; on the composite chart of the top 100 songs, it reached No. 2. On Billboard's country music charts, it was a No. 1 hit for nine weeks, and remained the longest-reigning of James's 23 chart-topping songs on the chart. Billboard ranked it as the No. 8 song of the year for 1957.

The recording was produced by Ken Nelson and was recorded October 30, 1956, at the Bradley Studios in Nashville, Tennessee. The vocal backing was provided by Harlan Powell, one of James's band members at the time, Gordon Stoker and one other individual. The Jordanaires backed Sonny James on several songs in the late 1950s and on a few of his songs when he returned to Capitol in 1963, but it was the vocal sounds of The Southern Gentlemen, who joined him in August 1964, that provided his vocal background thru 1971.

The flip side of James's version of "Young Love" was a song called "You're the Reason I'm in Love." That song was a Top 10 hit on the Billboard country charts in early 1957. In 1971, 14 years after the original, James re-recorded that song in a faster-tempoed, horn-heavy rendition as "That's Why I Love You Like I Do" (the original slower-tempoed song featured an electric guitar solo); the newly recorded, re-titled version was released as a single and reached No. 1 in June 1972.

In the book Helter Skelter by Vincent Bugliosi and Curt Gentry, James' version of this song is mentioned to have been frequently played on the radio at the Spahn Ranch. It was also a term of endearment used by Charles Manson in reference to his female followers.

In 2020, this version was featured in the Netflix psychological thriller film, The Devil All the Time.

== Tab Hunter version ==
"Young Love"

Single by Tab Hunter
- B-side: "Red Sails in the Sunset"
- Released: December 25, 1956
- Recorded: December 15, 1956
- Studio: Ryder Sound (Hollywood)
- Genre: Pop
- Length: 2:24
- Label: Dot
- Songwriters: Carole Joyner; Ric Cartey
- Producer: Billy Vaughn

Tab Hunter singles chronology
"Young Love" (1956)	"Ninety-Nine Ways" (1957)

=== Background ===
In December 1956, American actor Tab Hunter recorded a cover version of "Young Love" as his debut single. It was released through Dot Records on December 25, 1956. Randy Wood, president of Dot Records, believed that Sonny James's cover would do well on the country charts and that a pop version could further broaden the song's appeal. Wood approached Hunter who, despite limited vocal experience, liked the song and agreed to record it.

=== Chart performance ===
It first reached the Billboard charts on January 19, 1957. It peaked at No. 1 on the following charts: the Disk Jockey chart, the Best Seller chart, the Juke Box chart, and the composite chart of the top 100 songs. This version stayed No. 1 for a full six weeks and became a gold record. Billboard ranked this version as the No. 4 song for 1957. The success of this record led Warner Bros., where Hunter was a contract player, to form Warner Bros. Records.

=== Critical reception ===
A staff writer for Cashbox described Hunter's cover as "impressive", specifically praising his baritone voice.

=== Live performances ===
On February 2, 1957, Hunter performed the song on The Perry Como Show.

=== Legacy ===
The song's success prompted the creation of Warner Records.

=== Charts ===
==== Weekly charts ====
Weekly chart performance for "Young Love"
Chart (1957)	Peak position
UK Singles (Official Charts)	1
US Best Sellers in Stores (Billboard)	1
US Top 50 Best Selling Tunes on Records (Cash Box)	1

==== Year-end charts ====
1957 year-end chart performance for "Young Love"
Chart (1957)	Position
US Best Sellers in Stores (Billboard)	4
US Most Played by Jockeys (Pop) (Billboard)	4
US Most Played by Jockeys (R&B) (Billboard)	49
US Best Selling Records (Cash Box)	4

== The Crew-Cuts version ==
The recording by the Canadian vocal group The Crew-Cuts was released by Mercury Records as catalog number 71022. It first reached the Billboard chart on January 26, 1957. On the Disk Jockey chart, it peaked at No. 17; on the Juke Box chart, at No. 17; on the composite chart of the top 100 songs, it reached No. 24.

== Lesley Gore version ==
"Young Love"

Single by Lesley Gore

from the album Lesley Gore Sings All About Love
- B-side: "I Just Don't Know If I Can"
- Released: March 1966
- Recorded: November 10, 1965
- Studio: A & R Recording (New York City)
- Genre: Pop
- Length: 2:18
- Label: Mercury
- Songwriters: Carole Joyner; Ric Cartey
- Producer: Shelby Singleton

Lesley Gore singles chronology
"We Know We're in Love" (1966)	"Young Love" (1966)	"Off and Running" (1966)

American pop star Lesley Gore recorded a version of "Young Love" for Mercury Records in late 1965. Her rendition was released on her sixth studio album, Lesley Gore Sings All About Love, on January 11, 1966. In March of that year, after the album's first two singles failed to make the top 50, Gore's recording was released as the third and final outing from the album as catalog number 72553. The single first entered the Billboard Hot 100 chart on March 26, 1966, and eventually peaked at #50. Gore's version also reached a peak of #24 in Australia, and #43 in Canada. The song was Lesley Gore's biggest commercial success for 1966, and she would not have another chart hit until February 1967 with "California Nights".

Chart (1966)	Peak position
Australia (Kent Music Report)	24
Canada RPM Top Singles	43
US Billboard Hot 100	50
US Cashbox Top 100	57

== Donny Osmond version ==
"Young Love"

Single by Donny Osmond

from the album Alone Together
- B-side: "A Million to One"
- Released: July 7, 1973
- Recorded: November 27, 1972
- Genre: Pop
- Length: 2:18
- Label: MGM
- Songwriters: Ric Cartey, Carole Joyner
- Producers: Mike Curb, Don Costa

Donny Osmond singles chronology
"The Twelfth of Never" (1973)	"Young Love" (1973)	""When I Fall in Love" / "Are You Lonesome Tonight" (1973)

In 1973, the song was revived by American teen idol Donny Osmond on MGM Records. His version featured Donny's spoken recitation on the first half of the second verse. The Mike Curb and Don Costa produced version became a hit on both sides of the Atlantic, reaching No. 23 on the Billboard Hot 100, No. 1 on the UK Singles Chart, spending four weeks at the top in August 1973, and #4 on the Canadian RPM Magazine Top 100.

=== Chart history ===
==== Weekly charts ====
Chart (1973)	Peak position
Australia (Kent Music Report)	10
Canada RPM Top Singles	4
Ireland (IRMA)	1
Netherlands (Dutch Top 40)	6
UK	1
U.S. Billboard Hot 100	23
U.S. Billboard Adult Contemporary	26
U.S. Cash Box Top 100	41

==== Year-end charts ====
Chart (1973)	Rank
Australia	91
Canada	61
Netherlands (Dutch Top 40)	59
UK	19
U.S. (Joel Whitburn's Pop Annual)	167

== Other versions ==
- In 1969 a duet version of the song was made by country music singers Connie Smith and Nat Stuckey. Their version reached No. 20 on the Country Music charts.
- In 1976, Ray Stevens charted with the song, reaching No. 48 on Billboard's country chart and No. 93 on the pop chart.
- In 1993, Twister Alley covered the song on their self-titled album, and released it as a single. It peaked at No. 70 on the US Country singles chart.The song was also recorded by Frankie Avalon, Tommy Steele and Frank Ifield.
