= The Rationals =

American rock band

- Origin: Ann Arbor, Michigan, United States
- Genre: Garage rock
- Years active: 1964–1970
- Labels: A-Square, Cameo, Capitol, Crewe Records, Rouge Records
- Past members: Scott Morgan; Steve Correll; Terry Trabandt; Bill Figg

The Rationals were an American rock band from Ann Arbor, Michigan.

== History ==
The Rationals formed in 1964 and first recorded a single for a local label, A^{2} Records, in 1965. After scoring a local hit with the tune "Gave My Love", they recorded a remake of Otis Redding's "Respect". This won them a contract for national distribution by Cameo/Parkway, and the single ended up reaching #92 on the Billboard Hot 100. The record didn't break everywhere in the U.S. at the same time, so it had a tough time making a decent showing on the national charts. Several further singles, including "I Need You" and "Hold On Baby", were successes in Michigan but didn't catch on nationally. Lead singer Scott Morgan was asked to join Blood, Sweat & Tears, but he declined the offer. The group's only full-length, a self-titled effort, arrived on Crewe Records at the beginning of 1970, and the group split up soon after; Morgan went on to play with several other Detroit-area groups over the next three decades, including Sonic's Rendezvous Band (with Fred Smith of MC5) and several of his own bands.

The lyrics of Iggy Pop's track "Get Up And Get Out" from his 1980 album "Soldier" are mostly lifted from the band's 1967 single "Leavin' Here", (written & first recorded by Eddie Holland on Motown in 1963) which was included on Goldenlane Records' 2009 compilation, "60s Garage Nuggets".

In 1995, John Sinclair released a live recording of a 1968 Rationals benefit concert entitled Temptation 'bout to Get Me. Sinclair also named his book Guitar Army after the Rationals song of the same name.

The band's version of The Kinks' "I Need You" was also featured on the compilation Nuggets: Original Artyfacts from the First Psychedelic Era, 1965–1968.

The Big Beat record label released Think Rational!, a two-CD anthology of the mid-1960s phase of the Rationals' career, in July 2009.

In 2010, The Rationals were voted into the Michigan Rock and Roll Legends online Hall of Fame.

== Members ==
- Steve Correll – lead guitar, vocals
- Bill Figg – drums
- Scott Morgan – guitar, vocals
- Terry Trabandt – bass, vocals

== Discography ==
Albums

- The Rationals, 1970
- Temptation 'bout to Get Me, 1995
- Think Rational!, 2009
- The Rationals (Deluxe Edition), 2018

Singles

Release date	Title	US release	Billboard
1965	"Look What You're Doing (To Me Baby)"/"Gave My Love"	A² 101	--
1966	"Feelin' Lost"/"Little Girls Cry"	A² 103	--
1966	"Respect"/"Leavin' Here" [Version 1]	A² 104	--
1966	"Respect"/"Feelin' Lost"	Cameo 437	92
1967	"Hold On Baby"/"Sing"	A² 105	--
1967	"Hold On Baby"/"Sing"	Cameo 455	--
1967	"I Need You"/"Get The Picture"	A² 402 'B'-side by SRC	--
1967	"Turn On"/"Irrational"	Danby's 125850/1; Danby's Men's Shops promotional copy	--
1967	"Leavin' Here" [Version 2]/"Not Like It Is"	A² 106	--
1967	"Leavin' Here" [Version 2]/"Not Like It Is"	Cameo 481	--
1967	"Leavin' Here" [Version 2]/"Leavin' Here" [Version 2]	Cameo 481; DJ copy	--
1968	"I Need You"/"Out In The Streets"	A² 107	--
1968	"I Need You"/"Out In The Streets"	Capitol 2124	--
1969	"Guitar Army"/"Sunset"	Genesis No. 1	--
1969	"Handbags And Gladrags"/"Guitar Army"	Crewe 340	--
1969	"Handbags And Gladrags"/"Handbags And Gladrags"	Crewe 340 promotional copy	--
