= My Town, My Guy & Me =

Studio album by Lesley Gore
- Released: September 1965
- Studio: A & R, New York City
- Genre: Pop; rock
- Length: 30:55
- Label: Mercury
- Producer: Quincy Jones

Lesley Gore chronology
Girl Talk (1964)	My Town, My Guy & Me (1965)	Lesley Gore Sings All About Love (1966)

Singles from My Town, My Guy & Me
- 1. "My Town, My Guy & Me"/"A Girl in Love" Released: August 19, 1965

My Town, My Guy & Me is the fifth studio album by American singer Lesley Gore, released in September 1965.

The album was originally titled Lesley Gore Sings for Girls in Love.

== Commercial performance ==
My Town, My Guy & Me was much less successful than its predecessors. Only the album's title track found chart success; the single peaked at 32 on the Billboard Hot 100, after five weeks on the chart, and dropped out of the top forty after eight weeks.

== Critical reception ==
Billboard Magazine rated the album a "package of strong pop material", with Gore's vocals on "No Matter What You Do" highlighted as "a standout" performance. Retrospectively, AllMusic awarded the album three stars, calling it Gore's "last fairly-strong non-greatest-hits LP, and the last to feature a reasonable standard of material." However, like her previous albums, it features "a number of goodies for fans inclined to dig beyond the 45s of this very singles-oriented artist."

Billboard described the title track as an "exciting rhythm number with clever lyric" and praised the "intriguing backing and powerful vocal." Cash Box described it as a "rhythmic romantic rocker about a gal who just wants to be in the same town as the guy of her dreams."

== Track listing ==
Side one
No.	Title	Writer(s)	Length
1.	"My Town, My Guy & Me"	Bob Elgin, Lesley Gore, Paul Kaufman
2.	"What's a Girl Supposed to Do"	Jeff Barry, Ellie Greenwich
3.	"What Am I Gonna Do with You"	Gerry Goffin, Russ Titelman
4.	"You Didn't Look 'Round"	Glen Stuart, Nola York
5.	"I Don't Care"	John Medora, David White
6.	"No Matter What You Do"	Mike Post, Dick St. John

Side two
No.	Title	Writer(s)	Length
7.	"The Things We Did Last Summer"	Sammy Cahn, Jule Styne
8.	"A Girl in Love"	Lesley Gore
9.	"Baby That's Me"	Jackie DeShannon, Jack Nitzsche
10.	"Just Another Fool"	Dennis Lambert, Louis Pegues
11.	"Let Me Dream"	Teddy Randazzo, Lou Stallman, Bobby Weinstein
12.	"Before and After"	Van McCoy
