= The Raindrops =

American pop group

- Origin: New York, United States
- Genre: Pop
- Years active: 1963–1965
- Label: Jubilee Records
- Past members: Ellie Greenwich; Jeff Barry

The Raindrops was an American pop group from New York, United States, associated with the Brill Building style of 1960s pop. The group existed from 1963 to 1965 and consisted of Ellie Greenwich and Jeff Barry, both of whom worked as writer/producers for numerous other acts before, during and after their tenure as The Raindrops.

== Biography ==
=== Formation ===
The group was formed around the nucleus of childhood friends, Jeff Barry and Ellie Greenwich. Greenwich had recorded a single in 1958 ("Cha-Cha Charming", as Ellie Gaye) while a college student, and Barry began working for a Brill Building music publisher in 1959, penning the hit "Tell Laura I Love Her" amongst others. The two met again that year and began dating; simultaneously, they began writing songs together, mainly for other artists. However, a couple of Greenwich-led discs were issued in the early 1960s under pseudonyms, one credited to Ellie Gee and The Jets, another to Kelli Douglas.

Greenwich and Barry married in October 1962. Greenwich also got a job in music publishing, not only writing but also singing on various demos of her publisher's songs.

In early 1963, Greenwich and Barry recorded a demo of their composition "What a Guy", a tune Barry had written for The Sensations. However, the group's label, Jubilee Records, chose to release Barry and Greenwich's demo as a single under the name "the Raindrops". (The group's name was reportedly inspired by "Raindrops," a 1961 hit song by Dee Clark.)

"What a Guy" hit number 41 on the U.S. Billboard Hot 100, and the group's follow-up, "The Kind of Boy You Can't Forget", peaked at number 17. The Raindrops' sound was "girl group" in style, with Greenwich singing lead vocal and double-tracked harmony parts, and Barry providing the nonsense-syllable bass vocals.

=== Live appearances and album ===
At this point, the group began to attract attention. Media stills of the group often depicted the group as a trio, featuring Greenwich and Barry as well as Greenwich's younger sister Laura, who did not sing on the records. The Raindrops made occasional live appearances, but rarely with the same personnel as on record; Ellie Greenwich sometimes had Beverly Warren sing live for her, and Bobby Bosco filled in at times for Barry. To preserve the illusion that the group was a trio, Laura Greenwich also occasionally appeared in live performances with the group, singing into a dead microphone.

The Raindrops released an album on Jubilee towards the end of 1963; a third single, "That Boy John", was a minor hit, but sank at radio after the assassination of John F. Kennedy. After a few further minor hits, Barry and Greenwich stopped releasing material as The Raindrops in early 1965, around the same time they became involved with Red Bird Records.

=== Post-Raindrops careers ===
Both Greenwich and Barry enjoyed successful careers as songwriters after the demise of The Raindrops, and Greenwich went on to a modest solo career as a singer as well. They divorced late in 1965, although they continued to write songs together for a time. They reunited on record for a 1967 single credited to The Meantime, which failed to chart. This was their last professional project as a duo.

Both Greenwich and Barry were inducted into the Songwriters Hall of Fame in 1991.

== Singles ==
Release date	Title	Chart Positions	
Release date	Title	Billboard Hot 100	U.S. R&B Singles
April 1963	"What a Guy"	41	25
August 1963	"The Kind of Boy You Can't Forget"	17	27
November 1963	"That Boy John"	64	-
March 1964	"Book of Love"	62	62
June 1964	"Let's Go Together"	109	-
September 1964	"One More Tear"	97	-
March 1965	"Don't Let Go"	-	-
