= Ric Cartey =

American musician and songwriter

Whaley Thomas Cartey better known as Ric Cartey (18 January 1937 – 5 August 2009) was an American rockabilly musician and songwriter.

He was born in born in Atlanta, Georgia, United States. He formed a duo with guitarist Charlie Broome performing locally. Ric and Charlie's band was called the Jiv-A-Tones. He was most famously a co-writer with Carole Joyner of the hit "Young Love", a popular song published in 1956. First released as a single by him and his band The Jiv-A-Tones in 1956, the B-side being "'Oooh-Eeee". He was signed to a recording contract to RCA Victor. In 1958, he signed with NRC.

"Young Love" was made more popular by versions from Tab Hunter, Sonny James, and The Crew-Cuts, all in 1957, and covered by Lesley Gore in 1965 and by Donny Osmond in 1972. It was recorded as a country version by Connie Smith and Nat Stuckey as a duo in 1969.

Cartey was one of the first young singers on Atlanta's rock and roll scene, which also encompassed Jerry Reed, Ray Stevens, Joe South, Tommy Roe and Mac Davis. In 1957, he worked with producer Chet Atkins in Nashville. In 1958, he released "Scratching On My Screen" with NRC Records. The song was a variation on Washboard Sam's 1939 blues song "Diggin' My Potatoes". Other songs he recorded included "Heart Throb", "I Wancha to Know" and "Born to Love One Woman".

Ric Cartey died in Palm Harbor, Florida, on 5 August 2009, at the age of 72.

== Discography ==
=== Singles ===
- 1956: "Young Love" / "Oooh-Eee"
- 1957: "Heart Throb" / "I Wancha to Know"
- 1957: "Born to Love One Woman" / "Let Me Tell You About Love"
- 1957: "Mellow Down Easy" / "My Babe"
- 1958: "Scratching On My Screen" / "My Heart Belongs to You"
- 1963: "Poor Me" / "Something In My Eye"
