= That's the Way Boys Are =

Single by Lesley Gore

from the album Boys, Boys, Boys
- B-side: "That's the Way the Ball Bounces"
- Released: March 9, 1964
- Recorded: March 4, 1964
- Label: Mercury
- Songwriters: Mark Barkan; Ben Raleigh
- Producer: Quincy Jones

Lesley Gore singles chronology
"You Don't Own Me" (1963)	"That's the Way Boys Are" (1964)	"I Don't Wanna Be a Loser" (1964)

"That's the Way Boys Are" is a song written by Mark Barkan and Ben Raleigh, first recorded by Lesley Gore and released in March 1964 – her fifth hit single, following four consecutive top five hits on Billboard's Hot 100. In late April 1964, with the British Invasion in full swing, "That's the Way Boys Are" peaked at No. 12 on the Hot 100; hits by UK acts The Beatles and The Dave Clark Five accounted for five of the singles in the Top Ten. The track was produced by Quincy Jones and arranged by Claus Ogerman and features on Gore's third album, Boys, Boys, Boys.

Music critic William Ruhlmann called the song "a well-crafted reflection from a sympathetic and understanding female perspective on the obtuse mating habits of boys." Author Richard Aquila noted that the lyrics "voice the era's acceptance of sexual double standards," in contrast with the theme of Gore's previous single, "You Don't Own Me". Aquila regards "That's the Way Boys Are" as one of several examples of Lesley Gore songs that regard women as dependents or passive objects, along with earlier singles "It's My Party" and "Judy's Turn to Cry." Musicologist Walter Everett described the song as one of the many 1960s sexist songs that "perpetuated a boys will be boys tolerance for male but not female infidelity." Music critic Greil Marcus also remarked on the way "That's the Way Boys Are" backs off from the "proto-feminist manifesto" of "You Don't Own Me" to a message of "he may treat you like garbage, but they're all like that, and we love 'em for it!" Rulmann described the music as "a bouncy, contemporary sound that compared favorably to the Phil Spector Wall of Sound style without being as ornamented." Cash Box described it as "a contagious, multi-tracked handclapper that Lesley and her choral-ork support shuffle thru in ultra-commercial manner" and praised the arrangement by Claus Ogerman. Subsequent to its initial release, "That's the Way Boys Are" has been released on compilation albums including The Golden Hits of Lesley Gore in 1965, It's My Party: The Mercury Anthology in 1996, Sunshine, Lollipops, and Rainbows: The Best of Lesley Gore in 1998, 20th Century Masters – The Millennium Collection in 2000 and The Ultimate Collection 1963-1968: Start the Party Again in 2005. It has also been included on multi-artist compilation albums such as Growin' Up Too Fast: The Girl Group Anthology in 1996 and Mad Men: A Musical Companion (1960-1965) in 2011.

"That's the Way Boys Are" was covered by Y Pants. Greil Marcus commented that the Y Pants version has more tension than Lesley Gore's version, and that the Y Pants version starts with a sad, sweet a cappella vocal but progresses to horrible screaming.
