= Lesley Gore Sings All About Love =

Studio album by Lesley Gore
- Released: 1966
- Genres: Pop; rock
- Label: Mercury
- Producer: Shelby Singleton

Lesley Gore chronology
My Town, My Guy & Me (1965)	Lesley Gore Sings All About Love (1966)	California Nights (1967)

Singles from Lesley Gore Sings All About Love
- 1. "I Won't Love You Anymore (Sorry)" Released: November 1965; 2. "We Know We're In Love" Released: January 1966; 3. "Too Young" Released: March 1966

Lesley Gore Sings All About Love is the sixth studio album by the American singer Lesley Gore, released in 1966. Shelby Singleton produced the record, with Nashville musicians like Buddy Harman, Hargus Robbins, and Jerry Kennedy providing the core of the session players.

== Critical reception ==
Professional ratings
Review scores
Source	Rating
AllMusic	2/5 stars
Cashbox	Positive (Pop Best Best)

=== Contemporary ===
The album was given a positive review from Cashbox magazine following its original release. Putting the album in its "Pop Best Bets" section, the publication stated that "Backed by full, soaring ork arrangements, the lark lets loose with a series of powerful love themes, some gentle and flowing, some vibrant and pulsing, but all handled with a high degree of professionalism." Record World believed that Gore "is still specializing in the teen-girl-faces love department and she's tops."

=== Retrospective ===
Richie Unterberger, in a review for AllMusic, says Lesley Gore Sings All About Love "marked a sharp drop-off in quality from her previous three LPs." He thought it "sounded kind of confused, with about half of the cuts bearing an obvious Motown influence (the Supremes in particular) and some of the rest filled out with oldies covers and pop standards." He doesn't think the Motown songs selections were inspired choices and that Gore "didn't handle these particular tunes with flair or distinction." While the original songs she co-wrote with her brother, Michael Gore, "weren't up to the level of her numerous previous fine cuts" featuring "her more trademark tortured adolescent approach."

== Chart performance and singles ==
The album debuted on the Record World 100 Top LP's chart in the issue dated March 5, 1966, peaking at No. 66 during an eight-week run on it. It would be her first album to miss the Billboard Top LPs (now called the Billboard 200) chart.

Lesley Gore Sings All About Love included three singles. "I Won't Love You Anymore (Sorry)" was first released by Mercury Records in November 1965. It debuted on the Billboard Hot 100 pop chart in December, reaching No. 80. "We Know We're In Love" taken from the album and released in January 1966, performed simiraly, stalling at No. 76. "Too Young" was taken from the album and released later in March 1966. It marked Gore's significant return to several charts; it reached the top-40 on the Australian charts at No. 24, while peaking at No. 43 on the Canada RPM chart. It also came close on the Billboard chart, reaching No. 50.

== Track listing ==
Side one
No.	Title	Writer(s)	Length
1.	"Young Lovers"	Rich Cartey, Carol Joyner	1:53
2.	"I Won’t Love You Any More"	Lesley Gore, Michael Gore	2:04
3.	"With Any Other Girl"	Shelly Coburn	2:18
4.	"Too Young"	Sylvia Dee, Sidney Lippman	2:24
5.	"Start the Party Again"	Arthur Resnick, Kenny Young	2:14
6.	"That’s What I’ll Do"	George Motola, Rickie Page	1:49

Side two
No.	Title	Writer(s)	Length
7.	"Only Last Night"	Barry Mason, Les Reed	2:34
8.	"To Know Him Is To Love Him"	Phil Spector	2:28
9.	"I Can Tell"	Steve Duboff	2:09
10.	"We Know We're Not Alone"	Lesley Gore, Michael Gore	2:10
11.	"Will You Love Me Tomorrow"	Gerry Goffin, Carole King	2:17
12.	"I Just Can’t Get Enough of You"	Jo Armstead, Nicholas Ashford	1:57

== Charts ==
Chart performance for Lesley Gore Sings All About Love
Chart (1966)	Peak position
US Record World 100 Top LP's	66
