= Sonic's Rendezvous Band =

1970s American rock band

- Origin: Ann Arbor, Michigan, U.S.
- Genres: Rock and roll; punk rock; garage rock
- Years active: 1974–1980
- Spinoff of: MC5; The Stooges; The Rationals; The Up
- Past members: Fred "Sonic" Smith; Scott Morgan; Gary Rasmussen; Scott Asheton

Sonic's Rendezvous Band (or SRB) was an American rock and roll band from Ann Arbor, Michigan, United States, forming in 1974, featuring veterans of the 1960s Detroit rock scene.

== Background ==
Sonic's Rendezvous Band was formed by members of four Michigan rock bands:

- Fred "Sonic" Smith, formerly of the MC5 – guitar, vocals
- Scott Morgan, formerly of The Rationals, a soul-influenced Detroit band of the 1960s – guitar, vocals
- Gary Rasmussen, formerly of The Up and more recently, Broken Arrow – bass
- Scott Asheton, formerly of The Stooges – drums

They remained virtually unknown, but their one and only single retained high interest among fans of Detroit rock. Due to a falling out between Smith, Asheton, and Rasmussen; touring with Iggy Pop on his ‘78 TV Eye tour through Europe; and Morgan recording some tracks for purely personal reasons to kill time while the other 3 were away, only the Fred Smith penned "City Slang", was pressed on both sides of the single. The Scott Morgan penned Electrophonic Tonic, was to be the actual B side of the record. Both songs prime examples of Hi-Energy Detroit rock & roll. One side was labeled mono and one side stereo, although both sides were identical mixes. A lo-fi bootleg LP composed of various radio appearances called Strikes Like Lightning was traded in the 1980s. Minus Scott Morgan they toured as backing band for Iggy Pop in spring 1978.

== Renewed interest ==
Interest in the band was kindled in the late 1990s when Alive / Total Energy Records released the studio recording of the then-unheard song "Electrophonic Tonic", the song that was to have been the B-side of "City Slang". In 1999, Mack Aborn Rhythm Arts released Sweet Nothing, a compact disc compilation of rare live and recorded SRB tunes. A second compilation called City Slang was released in 2000.

This in turn sparked a renewed interest in Scott Morgan, who was critically acclaimed in the 1980s with bands like Scots Pirates and the Scott Morgan Band who were largely successful only in the Midwest. SRB disciples, Sweden's Hellacopters recorded five Scott Morgan/ SRB compositions ("City Slang", "16 With a Bullet", "Downright Blue", "Heaven", "Slow Down [Take A Look]") which further popularized the group. Scott Morgan went on to record with The Hellacopters' Nicke Royale, releasing two Hydromatics albums as well as two soul albums by The Solution.

== Recent activity ==
The band has enjoyed renewed interest, along with mainstream critical acclaim in the music press, with the September 2006, release of a six-disc box set, Sonic's Rendezvous Band, by UK label Easy Action. The record was reviewed by Rolling Stone, October 19, 2006, by David Fricke, as one of "Fricke's Picks," saying of the band's 1978 single (included in the set), "City Slang" "5:15 of assault guitars, railroad drumming and Smith's determined-rebel call - has all you need to know why SRB were masters of their domain." That domain, as Fricke put it was "the Detroit Church of High Energy Rock," where Sonic's "holy rank" secured "forever." Said Fricke: "I just want as much of the best of this band as I can get, in good faith and quality. Right now, this is what I have. And I am playing it. Loud." Among other notable cuts in the set, Fricke, says, "a highlight is the sixteen-minute "American Boy," on which Smith plays a long, heated-raga solo on saxophone, evoking the MC5's earlier forays into the music of Sun Ra and Pharoah Sanders."

Fricke repeatedly cited Scott Morgan's influence, describing the two concert discs from 1975 and 1976 as having that "manic-white-Motown streak that Morgan in particular brought to SRB." Fricke mentioned that record "comes with its own controversy" over whether it was approved by all involved, but Easy Action asserts on its website that the release was approved by the surviving band members, and by Fred Smith's children and wife, Patti Smith.

== Discography ==
- Sweet Nothing (1999)
- City Slang (2000)
- Sonic's Rendezvous Band (Box Set) (2006)
- Masonic Temple, Detroit 1978 (2007)
