= Claudine Clark =

American R&B musician

- Also known as: Joy Dawn
- Born: April 26, 1941 (age 85); Macon, Georgia, U.S.
- Genres: R&B

Claudine Clark (born April 26, 1941) is an American R&B musician, best known as the singer and composer of the 1962 hit "Party Lights", which reached No. 5 on the Billboard Hot 100.

== Career ==
Clark was born in Macon, Georgia, United States, but grew up in Philadelphia, and she began recording in 1958 for the Herald record label, with her debut single, "Angel of Happiness". She was backed on that recording by the Spinners. Clark then moved to New York, but she also found no commercial return from her recording on Gotham Records, before moving to Chancellor Records. Clark then had a hit with her second single for Chancellor, with her self-penned "Party Lights". Originally the B-side of the label's preference for the A-side, "Disappointed", "Party Lights" peaked at No.5 on the Billboard Hot 100. Clark's follow-ups, "Walk Me Home from the Party" and "Walkin' Through a Cemetery", were commercial failures.

She continued to record and compose, including under the alias Joy Dawn for the Swan Records label, but saw no further tangible success.

While she disappeared into obscurity, it is found that she died sometime before 2021 as mentioned in her son's obituary of 2021 mentioning he was proceeded in death by his mother, Claudine Clark Hicks.
