= Teacho Wiltshire =

Barbadian-American pianist and bandleader (1909–1968)

- Also known as: George Wiltshire
- Born: Audrick Gladstone Wiltshire; September 20, 1909; St Andrew Parish, Barbados
- Origin: New York City
- Died: September 29, 1968 (aged 59) Teaneck, New Jersey, U.S.
- Genres: R&B
- Occupations: Musician, bandleader, arranger
- Instrument: Piano
- Years active: c.1930-1968

George "Teacho" Wiltshire (born Audrick Gladstone Wiltshire; September 20, 1909 – September 29, 1968) was a Barbadian-born American R&B pianist, bandleader, arranger, A&R man, and songwriter, who had success in the 1950s and 1960s with musicians including Annie Ross, Sister Rosetta Tharpe, the Isley Brothers and the Drifters.

== Life and career ==
Wiltshire was born on a plantation near Belleplaine in St Andrew Parish, Barbados, the son of Estelle Wiltshire and an unknown father. In 1917, he and his mother emigrated to the United States, and settled in the Bedford-Stuyvesant area of Brooklyn, New York City. After his mother married, he adopted his stepfather's surname and was registered at school as Audrick Rock, though in later adult life he used the name George Wiltshire. He married in 1929 but the couple soon separated.

In the 1930s, he played piano in clubs in Greenwich Village, before being drafted into the US Marines in 1940. He joined the music department of the 51st Defense Battalion, which was led by Bobby Troup, and Wiltshire was able to hear and play with such musicians as Lionel Hampton, Duke Ellington, and Louis Jordan. After the end of the war, he adopted the name "Teacho" - of unknown origin - and started working as a singer, pianist, and talent scout. In 1951 he began working in A&R for Prestige Records, and his band backed King Pleasure on his 1952 hit "Moody's Mood for Love", an early example of vocalese, the addition of lyrics to a jazz improvisation. The same year, Wiltshire led the band – including himself on piano, Percy Heath on bass, and Art Blakey on drums – behind Annie Ross on her successful original recording of "Twisted". He also discovered and recorded with the Mello-Moods on the Prestige label.

In 1955, Wiltshire began working with the Tin Pan Alley record label, essentially working on song poems, setting the lyrics submitted by non-professional writers to music, and recording the results. The following year, he joined Hull Records, where he worked with Mabel Lee, and also recorded with an orchestra under his own name. During the late 1950s, he was increasingly seen as an orchestrator and arranger, and worked on a freelance basis with various musicians including the Fidelitys, Nappy Brown, and Marie Knight. As a pianist, he was hired by producer Gene Schwartz to play on Dion's single, "Runaround Sue". His reputation grew with his arrangements on Sister Rosetta Tharpe's 1962 album The Gospel Truth.

In the early and mid 1960s, he collaborated with top R&B producers Leiber & Stoller and Bert Berns, working with acts such as Chuck Jackson, Derrick Harriott, The Exciters, The Isley Brothers – for whom he arranged their hit, "Twist and Shout" – The Shirelles, and Wilson Pickett. He arranged the Drifters' hit "Saturday Night at the Movies", and "Baby I'm Yours" by Barbara Lewis.

Wiltshire died in Teaneck, New Jersey in 1968, at the age of 59.
