= Ellie Greenwich =

American singer-songwriter (1940–2009)

Background information
- Born: Eleanor Louise Greenwich; October 23, 1940; New York City, U.S.
- Died: August 26, 2009 (aged 68) Manhattan, New York City, U.S.
- Genres: Rock and roll; Brill Building
- Occupations: Songwriter; background singer; record producer
- Years active: 1958–2009
- Website: elliegreenwich.com

Eleanor Louise Greenwich (October 23, 1940 – August 26, 2009) was an American pop music singer, songwriter, and record producer. She wrote or co-wrote "Da Doo Ron Ron", "Be My Baby", "Maybe I Know", "Then He Kissed Me", "Do Wah Diddy Diddy", "Christmas (Baby Please Come Home)", "Hanky Panky", "Chapel of Love", "Leader of the Pack", and "River Deep – Mountain High", among others.

== Early years ==
Eleanor Louise Greenwich was born in East Flatbush, Brooklyn, New York City to painter turned electrical engineer William Greenwich, a Catholic, and department store manager (later medical secretary) Rose Baron Greenwich, who was Jewish. Both parents were of Russian descent. She was not raised in either religion. She was reportedly named for Eleanor Roosevelt. Her musical interest was sparked as a child when her parents played music in their home and she listened to artists including Teresa Brewer, The Four Lads and Johnnie Ray, and she learned how to play the accordion at a young age. At age ten, she moved with her parents and younger sister, Laura, to suburban Levittown, New York.

By her teens, Greenwich was composing songs and said in a 1973 article, "When I was 14, I met Archie Bleyer who liked my songs but told me continue my education before trying to invade the songwriting jungle." At Levittown Memorial High School in Levittown, New York, Greenwich and two friends formed a singing group, the Jivettes, which took on more members and performed at local functions. While attending high school, she started using the accordion to write love songs about her school crush. After graduating high school, Greenwich applied to the Manhattan School of Music but was rejected because the school did not accept accordion players, and she subsequently enrolled at Queens College. Eventually she taught herself to compose on the piano rather than the accordion.

At 17, around the time she began attending Queens College, Greenwich recorded her first single for RCA Records, the self-written "Silly Isn't It", backed with "Cha-Cha Charming". The single was issued under the name "Ellie Gaye" (which she chose as a reference to Barbie Gaye, singer of the original version of "My Boy Lollipop"). However, a biography about Greenwich claimed that the name was changed by RCA Records to prevent mispronunciations of "Greenwich". "Cha-Cha Charming" was released in 1958 and indirectly led to her decision to transfer from Queens College to Hofstra University after one of her professors at the former institution belittled her for recording pop music.

== Partnership with Jeff Barry ==
In 1959, still at college, Greenwich met the man who became her husband and main songwriting partner. Although it is possible they had been acquainted as children, since they shared a relative, the first time Greenwich and Jeff Barry met formally as adults was at a Thanksgiving dinner hosted by her maternal uncle, who was married to Barry's cousin. Greenwich and Barry recognized their mutual love of music. Barry was married at that time to his first wife, who was at the dinner, but he and Greenwich married several years later and became a songwriting duo recognized as one of the most successful and prolific among Brill Building composers.

Greenwich and Barry began dating after his marriage was annulled, but musically they continued separate careers. Still in college, in 1962, Greenwich got her first break in the business when she traveled to the Brill Building to meet John Gluck Jr., one of the composers of the Lesley Gore hit "It's My Party". Needing to keep another appointment, Gluck installed Greenwich in an office and asked her to wait. The office turned out to be that of songwriter-producers Jerry Leiber and Mike Stoller. Hearing piano music from the cubicle, Leiber poked his head in and, expecting Carole King, was startled to see Greenwich, who introduced herself and explained her reasons for being there. Recognizing her potential as a songwriter, Leiber and Stoller agreed to allow her to use their facilities as she wished in exchange for first refusal on songs she wrote. They eventually signed Greenwich to their publishing company, Trio Music, as a staff songwriter.

Before marrying Barry, Greenwich wrote songs with different partners, including Ben Raleigh (co-writer on Barry's first hit as a composer, "Tell Laura I Love Her," in 1960) and Mark Barkan. She was also a session singer, recording so many demos that she became known as New York's Demo Queen. Her biggest hits during this period were written with Tony Powers. The Greenwich-Powers team made the charts with tunes such as "He's Got The Power" (The Exciters), "(Today I Met) The Boy I'm Gonna Marry" (Darlene Love), and "Why Do Lovers Break Each Others' Hearts?" (Bob B. Soxx & the Blue Jeans, with Love on lead vocal). These last two were co-written and produced by Phil Spector, who had been introduced to the songs, and to Greenwich, by music publisher Aaron Schroeder.

On October 28, 1962, Barry and Greenwich married and lived together in LeFrak City, Queens, and shortly afterward decided to write songs exclusively with each other – a decision that disappointed Tony Powers as well as Barry's main writing partner, Artie Resnick. Barry was subsequently signed to Trinity Music, and he and Greenwich were given their own office with their names on the door. Before the end of 1963, Barry-Greenwich had scored hits with songs such as "Be My Baby" and "Baby, I Love You" (The Ronettes), "Then He Kissed Me" and "Da Doo Ron Ron" (The Crystals), "Not Too Young To Get Married" (Bob B. Soxx & the Blue Jeans), and "Christmas (Baby Please Come Home)" by Darlene Love, all co-written and produced by Phil Spector. Greenwich and Barry also recorded singles and an album under the name The Raindrops, with Greenwich providing all the female vocals through overdubbing, and Barry singing backgrounds in a bass voice. In addition to "What A Guy" (actually a demo, with Greenwich on piano and Barry on drums, sold to Jubilee Records and released as the first Raindrops single) and the U.S. Top 20 hit "The Kind Of Boy You Can't Forget," the couple wrote and recorded "Hanky Panky", which later became a hit for Tommy James and the Shondells in 1966 and, in 1964, "Do Wah Diddy Diddy", was taken to the No. 1 spot on the charts, in both the UK and the US, by Manfred Mann. Toward the end of 1963, the Raindrops recorded "That Boy John", a catchy fusion of jazz and rhythm and blues that reached the middle of the chart; President John F. Kennedy had just been assassinated and, according to Barry and Greenwich, radio stations were loath to play the song. Barry and Greenwich also penned songs for Connie Francis and in 1964 charted with two Lesley Gore hits, "Maybe I Know" and "Look of Love."

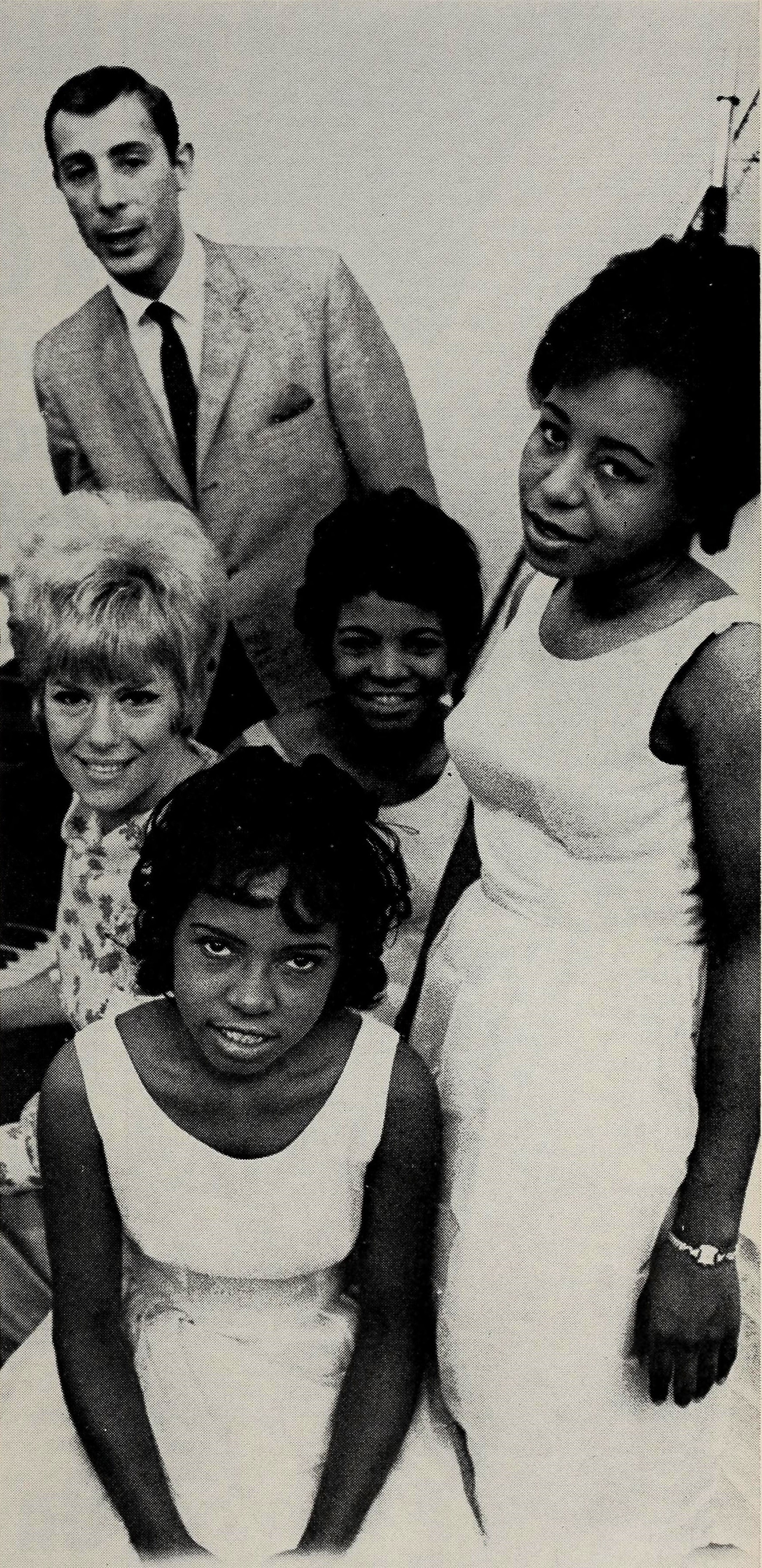
Greenwich and Jeff Barry with The Dixie Cups on the cover of Cash Box, August 29, 1964

When Red Bird Records was founded in 1964 by Leiber and Stoller, Barry and Greenwich were brought in as songwriters and producers. The label's first release was The Dixie Cups' "Chapel of Love" (written with Phil Spector and originally recorded by The Ronettes), which sailed up the U.S. chart to No. 1. Barry and Greenwich continued to write and/or produce hits for Red Bird, including several other releases by The Dixie Cups ("People Say") as well as The Ad-Libs ("He Ain't No Angel" and "Remember"), The Jelly Beans ("I Wanna Love Him So Bad"), and The Shangri-Las ("Leader of the Pack"), co-written by George "Shadow" Morton. Morton, Barry and Greenwich penned "You Don't Know," which Greenwich recorded on Red Bird under her own name in 1965, at the same time Barry recorded and released another Barry–Greenwich tune, "Our Love Can Still Be Saved".

However, the couple's marriage could not be saved; before the end of the year, Barry and Greenwich divorced. The couple continued to work together for much of 1966, partly due to Greenwich's discovery of a talented singer-songwriter named Neil Diamond. Barry, Greenwich and Diamond joined to form Tallyrand Music to publish Diamond's songs. Diamond was subsequently signed to Bert Berns's Bang Records, and had several hits such as "Cherry Cherry" and "Kentucky Woman", all produced by Barry and Greenwich, who also sang backgrounds on many tracks. In addition, Barry and Greenwich teamed with Phil Spector one last time to pen "I Can Hear Music" and "River Deep - Mountain High". "I Can Hear Music" was recorded by The Ronettes in 1966 as their final single for the Philles label, and recorded by The Beach Boys in 1969. Spector produced "River Deep - Mountain High" for Ike and Tina Turner, although Ike did not play on the song - accounts vary between Spector's Rock and Roll Hall of Fame speech in 1991, that he did not turn up to the studio when invited, to others claiming he was officially banned from the studio recording. Although "River Deep" peaked at No. 3 in the UK, the song was a commercial failure in the US, stalling at No. 88. A few years later, in 1970–71, The Supremes and The Four Tops had a No. 14 (U.S. chart) hit with their revival of "River Deep".

== Later career ==
During 1967, Greenwich formed Pineywood Music with Mike Rashkow, and over the next few years the Greenwich-Rashkow team wrote and/or produced recordings for Greenwich herself as well as for Dusty Springfield, the Definitive Rock Chorale, the Other Voices, The Fuzzy Bunnies, and the Hardy Boys. Also in 1967, Greenwich recorded her first solo album, Ellie Greenwich Composes, Produces and Sings, released in 1968, which produced two chart hits, "Niki Hoeky" (No. 1 in Japan) and "I Want You to Be My Baby". Additionally, Greenwich continued to provide background vocals and vocal arrangements for diverse artists such as Dusty Springfield, Bobby Darin, Lou Christie and Frank Sinatra, as well as Electric Light Orchestra, Blondie, Cyndi Lauper and Gary U.S. Bonds. She did studio work for her ex-husband as well, singing backgrounds for Andy Kim, who was recording for Barry's Steed Records, and the Archies.

At one such recording session, Greenwich met Steve Tudanger, with whom she and Steve Feldman would later form the company Jingle Habitat to write and produce jingles for radio and television. Tudanger and Feldman also co-produced Greenwich's second LP, Let It Be Written, Let It Be Sung, in 1973. Her song "Sunshine After the Rain" was a hit in the UK for singer Elkie Brooks. It was produced by Leiber and Stoller and taken from the Elkie Brooks album, Two Days Away. In 1976 Greenwich sang back-up for Debbie Harry on the song "In The Flesh" for Blondie's self-titled debut album. After her partnership with Rashkow ended in 1971, Greenwich collaborated with writers such as Ellen Foley and Jeff Kent; the Greenwich-Kent-Foley team penned "Keep It Confidential", a hit for Nona Hendryx on the R&B chart in 1983. That same year, "Right Track Wrong Train", which Greenwich wrote with Kent and Cyndi Lauper, was the B-side of Cyndi's "Girls Just Wanna Have Fun", which hit No. 2 on the U.S. chart, and spent three weeks at No. 1 on the Australian chart.

== Legacy ==
Greenwich's affiliation with Ellen Foley and Nona Hendryx indirectly led to a Broadway show that resurrected her 1960s music. When Foley and Hendryx performed at The Bottom Line cabaret in New York City, Greenwich was there to see them. The Bottom Line owner Allan Pepper convinced Greenwich to meet him and discuss putting together a revue showcasing her hits. In 1984, Leader of the Pack, a show based on Greenwich's life and music, opened at The Bottom Line. Greenwich appeared as herself in the second act, which focused on her early years in Long Island and her marriage and partnership with Barry. The show was revamped for Broadway and opened at the Ambassador Theatre the following year. Cast members included Greenwich, Darlene Love, Annie Golden, Dinah Manoff as young Ellie, and Patrick Cassidy as Jeff Barry. Leader of the Pack was nominated for a Tony Award for Best Musical and a Grammy Award for the cast album, and the play garnered The New York Music Critics' Award for Best Broadway Musical. During the 1990s and into the new millennium, the musical has enjoyed several revivals and continues to be performed at schools and community theaters. Leader of the Pack is still performed all over the world.

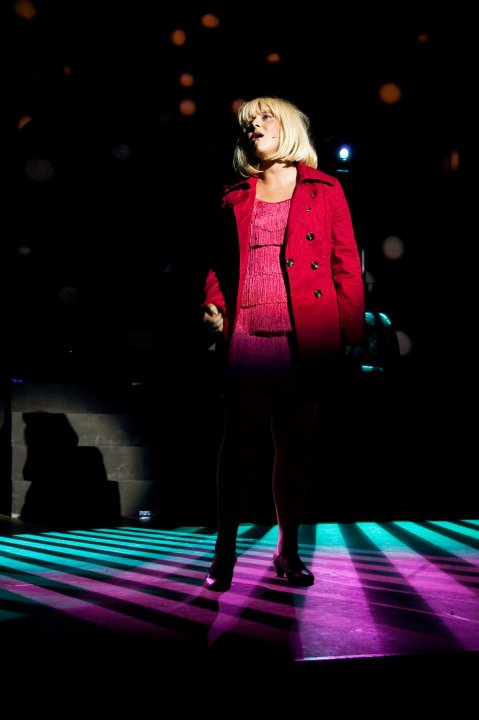
Greenwich being portrayed in Leader of the Pack in 2010

In 1991, Greenwich and Barry were inducted together into the Songwriters Hall of Fame. In 2004, Rolling Stone's list of the 500 greatest rock songs included six Greenwich-Barry compositions, more than any other non-performing songwriting team. In 1964 alone, the duo were responsible for writing 17 singles that reached the Billboard Hot 100 chart.

On December 15, 2009, The Rock and Roll Hall of Fame announced that Greenwich and Barry would receive the Ahmet Ertegun Award in March 2010 (which was posthumously awarded to Greenwich) for helping to define the Brill Building sound. At the ceremony at the Waldorf-Astoria, which was telecast on the Fuse TV cable network, Carole King inducted Greenwich, Barry, and other songwriting colleagues from the 1950s and early 1960s, including Barry Mann & Cynthia Weil, Otis Blackwell (also posthumously), Mort Shuman and Jesse Stone. Ellie's award was accepted by her sister Laura, while Barry's acceptance was read by Steve van Zandt.

On May 7, 2013, a "Garden of Ellie" that contains a statue of Greenwich was placed next to Hofstra University's music school. The sculpture was commissioned by Greenwich's family and created by Peter Homestead.

== Death ==
On August 26, 2009, Greenwich died of a heart attack at St. Luke's-Roosevelt Hospital (now Mount Sinai West), New York City, where she had been admitted a few days earlier for treatment of pneumonia.

On September 20, 2009, Bruce Springsteen and the E Street Band dedicated "Da Doo Ron Ron" to Greenwich, while playing the song during a concert at the United Center, Chicago. Springsteen called Greenwich an "incredible rock and soul songwriter" before playing the song.

On February 3, 2010, Patti Smith dedicated an improvised arrangement of "Be My Baby" to Greenwich while playing a show on the Santa Monica Pier in California.

== Discography ==
- The Raindrops by The Raindrops with Jeff Barry (1963)
- Ellie Greenwich Composes, Produces & Sings (1968)
- Let It Be Written, Let it Be Sung (1973)

== Selected songs ==
Year	Song title	Artist	Written with	Recording date	US Billboard Hot 100	US R&B chart	UK Singles Chart	Producer	Miscellaneous
1962	"Why Do Lovers Break Each Other's Heart"	Bob B. Soxx and the Blue Jeans	Phil Spector, Tony Powers	November	38				arranged by Jack Nitzsche lead vocal by Darlene Love
1963	"Da Doo Ron Ron"	The Crystals	Jeff Barry, Phil Spector	March	3	5	5	Phil Spector	arranged by Jack Nitzsche
1963	"(Today I Met) The Boy I'm Gonna Marry"	Darlene Love	Phil Spector, Tony Powers	March	39			Phil Spector	arranged by Jack Nitzsche
1963	"Why Don't They Let Us Fall in Love"	Veronica	Jeff Barry, Phil Spector	March				Phil Spector	arranged by Jack Nitzsche
1963	"Then He Kissed Me"	The Crystals	Jeff Barry, Phil Spector	July	6	8	2	Phil Spector	
1963	"Be My Baby"	The Ronettes	Jeff Barry, Phil Spector	July	2		4	Phil Spector	arranged by Jack Nitzsche
1963	"Baby, I Love You"	The Ronettes	Jeff Barry, Phil Spector	November	24		11	Phil Spector	arranged by Jack Nitzsche
1963	"Christmas (Baby Please Come Home)"	Darlene Love	Jeff Barry, Phil Spector		19		22	Phil Spector	
1963	"Hanky Panky"	Tommy James and the Shondells	Jeff Barry	1963/1966	1	2	38		The song had been originally recorded by The Raindrops and the Summits. James recorded it in 1963 but it did not become a hit until 1966
1963	He's Got the Power	The Exciters	Tony Powers		57			Leiber, Stoller	arranged by Teacho Wiltshire
1963	"Do Wah Diddy"	The Exciters	Jeff Barry		78			Leiber/Stoller	arranged by Artie Butler
1964	"Chapel of Love"	The Dixie Cups	Jeff Barry, Phil Spector	February	1		22	Jerry Leiber, Mike Stoller, Greenwich and Barry	
1964	"Do Wah Diddy Diddy"	Manfred Mann	Jeff Barry	June 11	1		1	John Burgess	
1964	"Maybe I Know"	Lesley Gore	Jeff Barry		14		37	Quincy Jones	arranged by Claus Ogerman
1964	"Leader of the Pack"	The Shangri-Las	Shadow Morton, Jeff Barry		1		3	Shadow Morton	
1964	"Look of Love"	Lesley Gore	Jeff Barry		27			Quincy Jones	
1965	"Out in the Streets"	The Shangri-Las	Jeff Barry		53			Shadow Morton	
1966	"River Deep – Mountain High"	Ike and Tina Turner	Jeff Barry, Phil Spector	March	88		3	Phil Spector	
1966	"I Can Hear Music"	The Ronettes	Jeff Barry, Phil Spector		100			Jeff Barry	
1967	"I'll Never Need More Than This"	Ike and Tina Turner	Jeff Barry, Phil Spector		114		64	Phil Spector	arranged by Jack Nitzsche
1968	"I Can Hear Music"	The Beach Boys	Jeff Barry, Phil Spector	October 1	24		10	Carl Wilson	
1970	"Chapel of Love"	Bette Midler	Jeff Barry, Phil Spector	1970	40			arranged & produced by Barry Manilow, Geoffery Haslam, Ahmet Ertegun	two sided release flipped with Friends
