= I Don't Wanna Be a Loser =

- Dutch release picture sleeve

Single by Lesley Gore

from the album Boys, Boys, Boys
- B-side: "It's Gotta Be You"
- Released: May 5, 1964
- Recorded: March 28, 1964
- Genre: Pop music
- Length: 2:36
- Label: Mercury Records 72270
- Songwriter(s): Ben Raleigh, Mark Barkan
- Producer(s): Quincy Jones

Lesley Gore singles chronology
| "That's the Way Boys Are" (1964) | "I Don't Wanna Be a Loser" (1964) | "Maybe I Know" (1964) |

"I Don't Wanna Be a Loser" is a song written by Ben Raleigh and Mark Barkan and performed by Lesley Gore. It reached #12 on the adult contemporary chart and #37 on the Billboard Hot 100 in 1964. It was featured on her 1964 album, Boys, Boys, Boys.

Billboard described the song as a "fine teen ballad sung with grace and feeling." Cash Box described it as "a dramatic beat-ballad hip-swinger that Leslie delivers in her effective teen fashion" with a "tasteful" arrangement by Claus Ogerman.

The song was produced by Quincy Jones and arranged by Claus Ogerman. It was featured in the soundtrack of the 1964 movie The Pawnbroker.
