= Look of Love (Lesley Gore song) =

- Label of the "Look of Love" 45 rpm single on Mercury Records

Single by Lesley Gore

from the album Girl Talk
- A-side: "Look of Love"
- B-side: "Little Girl Go Home"
- Released: December 2, 1964
- Recorded: June 17, 1964
- Studio: A&R Recording Studios, New York
- Genre: Rock and roll
- Length: 2:10
- Label: Mercury Records #72372
- Songwriters: Ellie Greenwich, Jeff Barry
- Producers: Quincy Jones, Arr. Claus Ogerman

Lesley Gore singles chronology
"Hey Now" (1964)	"Look of Love" (1964)	"All My Life" (1965)

"Look of Love" is a song written by Ellie Greenwich and Jeff Barry, which was a 1964 Top 40 hit for Lesley Gore. The song was one in a long line of successful "Brill Building Sound" hits created by composers and arrangers working in New York City's Brill Building at 1619 Broadway. Pop songwriting stars Barry and Greenwich had previously scored hits with songs such as "Be My Baby" and "Baby, I Love You" (The Ronettes), and "Then He Kissed Me" and "Da Doo Ron Ron" (The Crystals). In the U.S., "Look of Love" peaked at #27 on the Billboard charts.

== Background ==
The most commercially successful solo singer to be identified with the girl group sound, Lesley Gore hit the number one spot with her first release, "It's My Party," in 1963. "Look of Love" was produced by Quincy Jones, who amped up the teenager's sound with double-tracked vocals and intricate backup vocals and horns. "Irresistibly melodic... it remains a classic archetype of female adolescent yearning." Billboard said of the song that it is "in the vein of [Gore's] early hits," predicting that it "will he a fast chart climber." Cash Box described it as "a most attractive multi-voiced reading of a handclappin' jump'er that's sure to make the teeners sit up and take notice real quick" with a "standout Claus Ogerman arrangement."

== Chart performance ==
Chart (1964–65)	Peak position
US Billboard Hot 100	27

== Cover versions ==
- The song has been covered by other artists, notably Pattie D'Arcy, Ellie Greenwich, and The Copycats.
