= Maybe I Know =

Single by Lesley Gore

from the album Girl Talk
- B-side: "Wonder Boy"
- Released: July 9, 1964
- Recorded: early July 1964
- Genre: Brill Building
- Length: 2:40
- Label: Mercury Records 72309
- Songwriters: Jeff Barry, Ellie Greenwich
- Producer: Quincy Jones

Lesley Gore singles chronology
"I Don't Wanna Be a Loser" (1964)	"Maybe I Know" (1964)	"Hey Now" (1964)

"Maybe I Know" is an early 1960s pop song written by Jeff Barry and Ellie Greenwich and performed by Lesley Gore. The song was produced by Quincy Jones and arranged by Claus Ogerman. It was featured on her 1964 album, Girl Talk.

== Background ==
The song was one in a long line of successful "Brill Building Sound" hits created by composers and arrangers working in New York City's Brill Building at 1619 Broadway. Pop songwriting stars Barry and Greenwich had previously scored hits with songs such as "Be My Baby" and "Baby, I Love You" performed by The Ronettes, as well as "Then He Kissed Me" and "Da Doo Ron Ron" by The Crystals.

Billboard described the song as a "medium tempo rocker with fine dance beat." Cash Box described it as "a handclappin' thumper geared for easy dancing and listening approval" and a "tuneful teen-angled vocal romp."

== Chart performance ==
"Maybe I Know" reached #14 on the Billboard Hot 100, #16 in Canada, #20 in the United Kingdom, and #37 in Australia in 1964.

=== Weekly charts ===
Chart (1964)	Peak position
Australia	37
Canada RPM Top Singles	16
UK	20
US Billboard Hot 100	14
US Cash Box Top 100	10

== Other versions ==
- The Seashells released a version of the song as a single in 1972 that reached #32 in the UK.
- Greenwich herself released a version of the song as a single in 1973.
- They Might Be Giants covered the song in many live performances, before a studio-recorded version was featured on their 1999 album, Long Tall Weekend.
