= California Nights =

- Dutch release picture sleeve

Single by Lesley Gore

from the album California Nights
- B-side: "I'm Going Out (The Same Way I Came In)"
- Released: January 1967
- Recorded: November 1966
- Genre: Pop
- Length: 2:49
- Label: Mercury Records 72649
- Songwriters: Marvin Hamlisch, Howard Liebling
- Producer: Bob Crewe

Lesley Gore singles chronology
"Treat Me Like a Lady" (1966)	"California Nights" (1967)	"Summer and Sandy" (1967)

"California Nights" is a song written by Marvin Hamlisch and Howard Liebling and recorded by Lesley Gore. The song appeared on her 1967 album, California Nights.

== Composition ==
The song was produced by Bob Crewe and arranged by Hutch Davie. The track features guitars and drum set in a 1960s pop fashion. The chorus includes multiples long tones over abnormal chords and the verses are noticeably accompanied by a soft electric piano. The lyrics speak of reminiscing about romantic evenings on the beach with a lover.

Billboard described the song as a "production rhythm ballad with groovy dance beat and strong vocal work has the hit ingredients to put Miss Gore back up the Hot 100."

== Commercial performance ==
The single peaked at number 16 on the Billboard Hot 100 in March 1967 but stayed on the chart for a then-lengthy 14 weeks, ranking 61 in the year-end Top 100. It was Gore's final Top Forty hit.

== Use in media ==
An edit of the song (removing the second verse and refrain) was lip-synced by Gore on the January 19, 1967 episode of the TV series Batman, "That Darn Catwoman". She played Pussycat, the Catwoman's protégé, who also wanted to be a singer.

== Charts ==
=== Weekly charts ===
Chart (1967)	Peak position
US Billboard Hot 100	16
US Cashbox Top 100	11

=== Year-end charts ===
Chart (1967)	Rank
US Billboard Hot 100	61

== Other versions ==
- Wes Montgomery released an instrumental version of the song on his 1967 album, A Day in the Life.
- Four King Cousins released a version of the song on their 1968 album, Introducing the Four King Cousins.
