= Ben Raleigh =

American composer (1913–1997)

Ben Raleigh (June 16, 1913, New York – February 26, 1997, Hollywood) was an American lyricist and composer responsible for a number of major hits, including "Dungaree Doll", "Wonderful! Wonderful!", "Hold on Girl", "She's a Fool", "I Don't Wanna Be a Loser", "Laughing on the Outside (Crying on the Inside)", “Love is a Hurtin' Thing”, “Tell Laura I Love Her” and "That's How Heartaches Are Made". His songs were recorded by artists such as Eddie Fisher, Nat King Cole, Johnny Mathis, Aretha Franklin, Bobby Darin, The Monkees, Dinah Shore, Lesley Gore, Ray Peterson and Lou Rawls. "Tell Laura I Love Her" reached No.1 in the United Kingdom in 1960. "Laughing on the Outside (Crying on the Inside)" peaked at No.3 in the United States in 1946.

Raleigh composed the theme song, "Rango", with Earle Hagen for the 1967 ABC situation comedy Rango . He also composed the theme song to Scooby-Doo, Where Are You! with David Mook. Hanna-Barbera attempted to buy him out, but he declined and chose to take a royalty instead.

Raleigh was killed in a kitchen fire in his home in Los Angeles, California, in 1997.
