= Julius Dixson =

American songwriter and record company executive

Julius Edward Dixson (who also used the spelling Dixon) (May 20, 1913 – January 30, 2004) was an American songwriter and record company executive.

== Life and work ==
Born in Barnwell, South Carolina, he served in the Army during World War II in England and France. After the war Dixson re-enlisted, was assigned to Special Services, and hosted a live weekly radio broadcast for the forces in Germany and the Middle East, Variety Jive, featuring new songwriters and musicians. According to fellow songwriter Beverly Ross, he fathered several children while in Europe.

In 1949 he returned to the United States and moved to New York City to work as a professional songwriter. He had greatest success co-writing with Beverly Ross, a rare musical pairing of an African-American male and a white female in the 1950s. Their first major hit was "Dim, Dim The Lights", which Bill Haley recorded in 1954 as the follow-up to "Shake, Rattle and Roll". The song reached number 10 on the Variety chart and number 11 on the Billboard pop chart. "Dim, Dim The Lights" is of historic importance, as it was not only Haley's first crossover hit with the black R&B audience, reaching number 10 on the US Billboard R&B chart, but the first R&B or rock and roll song recorded by any white artist to cross over to the R&B chart. "Dim, Dim The Lights" was hailed by Alan Freed as "the grand daddy song of rock n’ roll".

Also with Ross, Dixson co-wrote "Lollipop" for the duo Ronald and Ruby, who were in reality the black teenager Ronald Gumps (or Gumm) and Ross herself. The recording was originally for the purpose of a demo to shop the song, but RCA got ahold of it and Dixson, who owned the master and had produced the demo, agreed to let RCA release it. Their version rose up the chart reaching number 20, but when it was learned that Ronald and Ruby were an inter-racial duo, television appearances that had been previously booked got cancelled and interest in the song waned. Thanks to the cover version by The Chordettes, Lollipop reached number 2 and number 3 on the pop and R&B chart, respectively. In the UK the song was successfully covered by The Mudlarks, and it became a worldwide hit reaching number 1 in many countries.

Dixson also co-wrote Annie Laurie's hit "It Hurts to Be in Love" with Rudy Toombs, "Begging, Begging" with Rudy Toombs for James Brown, "Love, Life and Money" with Henry Glover for Little Willie John, and Kitty Wells' "Three Ways (To Love You)" with Lee Morris.

He also established the independent record label, Alton Records. In late 1959, the label's instrumental single release "The Clouds" by The Spacemen, also written and produced by Dixson, reached number 1 on the R&B chart. Another first for Dixson, "The Clouds" was the first number one on any chart released by an African-American owned independent record label, predating Motown's first number 1 by a year.

Dixson died in a hospital in Manhattan in 2004, at the age of 90. His family has claimed negligence by the hospital in his death and has filed a wrongful death lawsuit.
