= Beverly Ross =

American songwriter and musician (1939–2022)

- Born: September 5, 1934; Brooklyn, New York City, U.S.
- Died: January 15, 2022 (aged 87) Nashville, Tennessee, U.S.
- Genres: Pop, country, musical theatre
- Occupation: Songwriter
- Years active: 1954–2022
- Website: https://beverlyross.info

Beverly Ross (September 5, 1934 – January 15, 2022) was an American singer-songwriter and musician who co-wrote several successful pop songs in the 1950s and 1960s, including "Dim, Dim the Lights", "Lollipop" (which she also recorded as one half of Ronald & Ruby), "The Girl of My Best Friend", "Remember Then", and "Judy's Turn to Cry".

== Biography ==
=== Early life ===
Ross was born on September 5, 1934, in Brooklyn, New York, to Aron Ross, a cobbler, and Rachel (née Frank). She and her older sister, Phyllis, were raised in the Bronx, until the family moved to Lakewood, New Jersey, where they became chicken farmers. She learned the piano and began writing poetry and song lyrics. While she was still at high school, one of her songs was performed by Peggy Lee on national television.

=== Early writing career ===
Ross heard that if she began canvassing writers at the Brill Building with some of her songs, then she could make some contacts. So, in 1952 she moved back to New York, and did just that. She met black songwriter Julius Dixson (or Dixon), and together they wrote "Dim, Dim the Lights (I Want Some Atmosphere)". This was recorded by Bill Haley and His Comets in 1954 and became a crossover hit in both the pop chart and R&B chart the following year. The song was the first rock and roll song recorded by a white singer to reach the R&B chart, and was hailed by Alan Freed as "the grand daddy song of rock n’ roll". It reached number 11 in the charts.

In 1958 Ross and Dixson wrote one of her most lasting songs, "Lollipop". When Dixson explained that he was late for a songwriting session because his daughter had gotten a lollipop stuck in her hair, Ross began writing the song, and later recorded a demo version with Dixson's neighbor, teenager Ronald Gumm (or Gumps). Dixson, who owned the master and had produced the demo, then agreed to let RCA Records release it as by "Ronald and Ruby". The pair's version rose up the chart reaching no.20, but when it was learned that Ronald and Ruby were an inter-racial duo, television appearances that had been previously booked got cancelled. Cover versions by the Chordettes (no.2 in the US) and the Mudlarks (no.2 in the UK) rose higher up the charts, and the song became an international hit. Years later Ross had said, "I was writing serious songs and I just decided to write the silliest thing I could think of".

As a successful young songwriter, Ross was interviewed at the time, and said:

In this country it is taboo to express sexuality, and our adolescent population is very inhibited. The music brings some outlet to them. They need this. It is a medium in which they can express themselves... You can't sell the kids anything good, they won't buy it. The majority of the big hits are written by the kids and performed by them. The things are so unprofessional and illiterate that publishers are besieged. Everybody thinks he can write now because the standards are so low. The buying public's age is between 12 and 17, and this is what guides the industry.

While working at the Brill Building with Jeff Barry in the late 1950s, Ross was recruited by Jean Aberbach to work for the publishing company Hill & Range. She co-wrote the song "Dixieland Rock" with Aaron Schroeder, using the pseudonym Rachel Frank. The song was recorded by Elvis Presley for his 1958 movie King Creole and released on the soundtrack album. Ross also wrote "The Girl of My Best Friend" with Sam Bobrick. The song was first released as the B-side of a single by Charlie Blackwell, before being covered in 1960 by Presley, whose version — first issued on his album Elvis Is Back! — reached no.9 in the UK, and Ral Donner, who reached no.19 in the US. Around the same time, Ross also made recordings under her own name for Columbia Records, including "Stop Laughing At Me" (1958) and "Say Hello" (1959).

At Hill & Range Ross met aspiring songwriter Phil Spector, and began collaborating with him on songs and demo recordings. They worked together for about six months, and Ross later said: "I was really his only friend, and we got very attached to each other." She later wrote a memoir of the period, I Was the First Woman Phil Spector Killed: An Autobiography In Essays, in which she claims that Spector appropriated a riff she had composed as the basis for his later success, "Spanish Harlem", on which Spector and Jerry Leiber shared co-writing credits. She was so disillusioned by his betrayal that she went into a deep depression for a year afterwards.

By 1960 she was—with Carole King—one of the top female pop music songwriters, and was seen as "kind of a queen bee". Her later hits as a songwriter included "Candy Man", co-written with Fred Neil whom she had met at the Cafe Wha? in Greenwich Village. The song was recorded by Roy Orbison as the B-side of "Crying" in 1961, and was re-recorded by Mickey Gilley and Charly McClain in 1984 when it reached No. 5 on the US country music chart. She also co-wrote "Remember Then" with Tony Powers; the song was first recorded by the Earls in 1962. The following year, "Judy's Turn to Cry", which she co-wrote with Edna Lewis, was recorded by Lesley Gore and became another hit.

=== Later career ===
After some years away from the music business, Ross received a BMI award in 1985 for writing "Candy Man", and in 1989 set up home in Nashville. She wrote songs with Archie Jordan, Mark Dreyer, and others, which have been recorded by such artists as Engelbert Humperdinck, Bonnie Raitt, and Shelby Lynne.

From the 1990s, Ross also worked on writing musical theatre shows, including City of Light, a show about Paris during the Nazi occupation in World War II which she co-wrote with Thom Spahn. The show was given a staged read-through directed by Holly-Anne Ruggiero in New York in 2008.

In April 2013, Ross' memoir I Was the First Woman Phil Spector Killed, described as a "tell all book" in a "Gonzo journalistic style" about life in the Brill Building between 1958 and 1961, was published and was featured at the Rock and Roll Hall of Fame.

=== Death ===
Ross died from dementia at a hospital in Nashville, on January 15, 2022, at the age of 87.
