= Ronald & Ruby =

American pop vocal duo

Ronald & Ruby were an American pop vocal duo, best known for their 1958 hit single, "Lollipop".

The duo's members were Ronald Gumm, who was Black (or Gumps) and Beverly "Ruby" Ross who was white. Interracial pop groups were unusual at the time, and the group did not appear in public or in major press and television outlets. They had previously worked together as songwriters; among their credits are "Young and Hungry for Love", "Frankenstein Rock", "Fat Pat", "Soul Mates", "Don't Come to My Party", and "The Ghost of Love". In 1958, they released a single together entitled "Lollipop". It became a hit in the U.S., reaching No. 20 on the Billboard Hot 100. The song was covered to greater chart success by both the Chordettes and the Mudlarks.

They released several further singles, including "Love Birds", none of them hits. Ross continued as a songwriter, recording nearly 200 songs with BMI, including "Candy Man" (for Roy Orbison) and "Judy's Turn to Cry" (for Lesley Gore).
