= You Don't Own Me =

1963 single by Lesley Gore

Single by Lesley Gore

from the album Lesley Gore Sings of Mixed-Up Hearts
- B-side: "Run Bobby, Run"
- Released: December 11, 1963
- Recorded: September 21, 1963
- Genre: Doo-wop; R&B; blue-eyed soul
- Length: 2:31
- Label: Mercury
- Songwriters: John Madara; Dave White
- Producer: Quincy Jones

Lesley Gore singles chronology
"She's a Fool" (1963)	"You Don't Own Me" (1963)	"That's the Way Boys Are" (1964)

Official audio
- "You Don't Own Me" on YouTube

"You Don't Own Me" is a pop song written by Philadelphia songwriters John Madara and David White and recorded by Lesley Gore in 1963, when she was 17 years old. The song was Gore's second most successful recording and her last top-ten single. Gore herself considered it to be her signature song claiming, "I just can't find anything stronger to be honest with you, it's a song that just grows every time you do it."

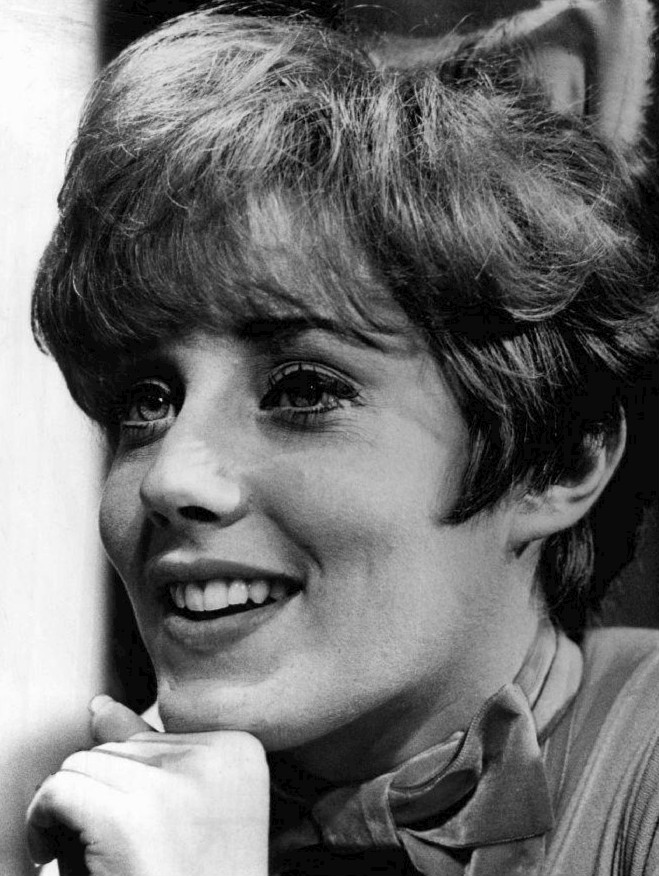
Lesley Gore, 1967

The song was prominent at the time of its release in 1963 as it symbolized women's empowerment, showing the strength of a woman capable of standing up for herself against a man. Since then, the song has been hailed as an early feminist anthem. In 2015, Saygrace released her debut single, a cover of the song featuring the American rapper G-Eazy; it peaked atop the ARIA Charts and achieved moderate international chart success. The following year, the song was inducted into the Grammy Hall of Fame.

== Background ==
The song expresses emancipation, as the singer tells a lover that he cannot objectify her. She doesn't want to be held to his hypocritical gender standards, such as not being able to see other men, when he sees other women. The song's lyrics became an inspiration for younger women and are sometimes cited as a factor in the development of the second wave feminist movement.

Gore said, "My take on the song was: I'm 17, what a wonderful thing, to stand up on a stage and shake your finger at people and sing you don't own me." In Gore's obituary, The New York Times referred to "You Don't Own Me" as "indelibly defiant". American music magazine CashBox described it as "a throbbing, multi-track, ballad-with-a-beat on which [Gore] emotionally declares her independence."

== Chart performance ==
The song reached number 2 on the Billboard Hot 100 in the United States. It remained at number 2 for three consecutive weeks, beginning on February 1, 1964, unable to surpass the Beatles' hit "I Want to Hold Your Hand". It became Gore's second most successful hit after "It's My Party". The song was Gore's last top-ten single.

=== Weekly charts ===
Chart (1964)	Peak position
US (Billboard Hot 100)	2
US (Cashbox Top 100)	2
Australia (Kent Music Report)	4
Canada (CHUM Hit Parade)	5
New Zealand (Listener)	2
Sweden	9

=== Year-end charts ===
Chart (1964)	Peak position
US (Billboard Year-End Hot 100)	36
US (Cashbox Year-End Top 100)	42
Brazil	47

== Certifications ==
Region	Certification	Certified units/sales
United Kingdom (BPI)	Silver	200,000^{‡}
^{‡} Sales+streaming figures based on certification alone.

== Later comparative criticism ==
After the success of "You Don't Own Me", many of Gore's other recordings (generally written by others), including "That's the Way Boys Are", were eventually comparatively criticized for not meeting feminist expectations. Of "That's the Way Boys Are", author Richard Aquila noted that the lyrics "voice the era's acceptance of sexual double standards," in contrast with the theme of Gore's previous single, "You Don't Own Me". Aquila regards "That's the Way Boys Are" as one of several examples of Lesley Gore recordings that regard women as dependents or passive objects, along with her earlier singles "It's My Party" and "Judy's Turn to Cry". Musicologist Walter Everett described "That's the Way Boys Are" as one of the many 1960s sexist songs that "perpetuated a boys-will-be-boys tolerance for male but not female infidelity." Music critic Greil Marcus also mentioned how "That's the Way Boys Are" backs off from the "proto-feminist manifesto" of "You Don't Own Me" to a message of "he may treat you like garbage, but they're all like that, and we love 'em for it!"

On August 14–21, 1965, Patty Duke peaked at No. 8 on the Hot 100 with "Don't Just Stand There", which sounds very similar to "You Don't Own Me".

== Impact ==
Lesley Gore's single "You Don't Own Me" was one of the first songs of its kind to become a feminist anthem, speaking out against the misogynistic culture at the time the single was written in 1963. The impact of this song is evident today, as it has become a song of women's empowerment that is often played during many feminist rights marches, campaigns, and is often showcased on TV shows with a similar agenda.

Lesley Gore re-recorded "You Don't Own Me" for her 11th album Ever Since in 2005, later utilizing it during the 2012 presidential campaign encouraging women to vote and protect women's reproductive rights. The song has since been used in many different feminist rights campaigns, marches and TV shows, highlighting the significance of the powerful message the song still delivers. Gore said “After some 40 years, I still close my show with that song because I can’t find anything stronger, to be honest with you". She still believes in the song's message, stating "When you can do a song in different ways, and do it over different periods of time, and it still has its legs, there's something to be said for that".

Gore died in 2015 at the age of 68, sparking a remembrance of the hit song, "which only grew stronger as the rallying cry during the women’s marches in 2018 around the MeToo movement". Even in death, she captivated a nation with the powerful words in "You Don't Own Me".

In June 2026, CBS News included the song in its list of the 250 essential American songs of the past 250 years.

== Grace version ==
"You Don't Own Me"

Single by Grace featuring G-Eazy

from the EP Memo and the album FMA
- Released: March 17, 2015
- Recorded: February 2015
- Genre: Pop; R&B
- Length: 3:19
- Label: RCA
- Songwriters: John Madara; David White; Gerald Gillum
- Producers: Quincy Jones; Parker Ighile

Saygrace singles chronology
"You Don't Own Me" (2015)	"Dirty Harry" (2015)

G-Eazy singles chronology
"Fuck with U" (2014)	"You Don't Own Me" (2015)	"You Got Me" (2015)

Music video
- "You Don't Own Me (ft. G-Easy)" on YouTube

=== Background ===
In 2015, the song was recorded by Australian singer Grace and was released as her debut single. It features American rapper G-Eazy. Grace's version was produced by Quincy Jones, who also produced the original recording by Lesley Gore, and Parker Ighile. It was released on March 17, 2015, one month after Gore's death. The song was released worldwide on August 17, 2015. In an interview with House of Fraser, Grace said, "Quincy Jones told me how the song came out during the feminist movement and how it was such a strong statement. I loved the song, started researching Lesley Gore and fell in love with her as an artist. [You Don't Own Me] really inspired me."

=== Charts ===
It peaked at number 1 on the ARIA Charts, later being certified 3× Platinum by the ARIA. The song was also a success in New Zealand, peaking at number 5 for two consecutive weeks, and in the United Kingdom, peaking at number 4.

=== In popular culture ===
It grew to prominence in the UK when it was used in the 2015 House of Fraser Christmas advert. It was also performed by The X Factor contestant Lauren Murray in 2015 and Matt Terry in 2016. The increased exposure for the song helped it rise to a peak of number 4 on the UK Singles Chart.

The song was featured in the third trailer for the 2016 film Suicide Squad and appeared on the film's soundtrack album.

The song was featured in the opening of Riverdale's eighth episode in March 2017, as well as the background music for the 2018 Ford Mustang GT commercial, with Helen Hunt and Evan Rachel Wood.

A music video directed by Taylor Cohen was released on June 1, 2015.

=== Charts and certifications ===
==== Weekly charts ====
Chart (2015–2016)	Peak position
Australia (ARIA)	1
Canada Hot 100 (Billboard)	45
Czech Republic Singles Digital (ČNS IFPI)	52
France (SNEP)	182
Hungary (Single Top 40)	32
Ireland (IRMA)	13
Italy (FIMI)	89
New Zealand (Recorded Music NZ)	5
Portugal (AFP)	62
Scottish Singles Sales (Official Charts)	3
Slovakia Airplay (ČNS IFPI)	50
Slovakia Singles Digital (ČNS IFPI)	38
Spain (Promusicae)	19
Switzerland (Schweizer Hitparade)	60
UK Singles (Official Charts)	4
US Billboard Hot 100	57
US Pop Airplay (Billboard)	22

==== Year-end charts ====
Chart (2015)	Position
Australia (ARIA)	26
New Zealand (Recorded Music NZ)	43
Chart (2016)	Position
Iceland (Plötutíóindi)	49
UK Singles (Official Charts Company)	87

==== Certifications ====
Region	Certification	Certified units/sales
Australia (ARIA)	4× Platinum	280,000^{‡}
Canada (Music Canada)	2× Platinum	160,000^{‡}
Denmark (IFPI Danmark)	Gold	45,000^{‡}
Italy (FIMI)	Gold	25,000^{‡}
Mexico (AMPROFON)	Gold	30,000^{‡}
New Zealand (RMNZ)	3× Platinum	90,000^{‡}
Poland (ZPAV)	2× Platinum	40,000^{‡}
Switzerland (IFPI Switzerland)	Gold	15,000^{‡}
United Kingdom (BPI)	2× Platinum	1,200,000^{‡}
United States (RIAA)	Platinum	1,000,000^{‡}
^{‡} Sales+streaming figures based on certification alone.

== Other notable covers ==
- Dusty Springfield released an early cover on her 1964 album A Girl Called Dusty.
- Keanya Collins recorded her version which was released on the Itco Stereo Records label in 1969. It was a Newcomer Pick in the 13 September issue of Cash Box where it received a positive review. It made it to No. 42 on the Billboard Soul chart.
- The Ormsby Brothers released the first male version of this song in 1973. The New Zealand group's version peaked at number 5 in Australia in that year.
- Joan Jett included a cover of the song in her 1980 solo debut album Bad Reputation featuring guitarist Steve Jones and drummer Paul Cook of Sex Pistols.
- André Hazes recorded a Dutch-language version of the song in 1981 for his album Gewoon André; "Zeg Maar Niets Meer" was popular in Europe, and reached number 2 in the Dutch charts in early 1982.
- The song was featured at the end of the 1996 film The First Wives Club as sung by Diane Keaton, Bette Midler and Goldie Hawn. It also attracted a fan following.
- Kristin Chenoweth recorded a cover of this song alongside Ariana Grande, for her 2019 album For the Girls.
- The 2022 Netflix series Stay Close used "You Don't Own Me" as the theme song, sung by Nikki Williams.
- The Blow Monkeys covered the song for the soundtrack to the 1987 film Dirty Dancing.

== See also ==
- List of feminist anthems
- My body, my choice
