= Saygrace =

Australian singer (born 1997)

- Born: Grace Sewell; 8 April 1997 (age 29); Brisbane, Queensland, Australia
- Origin: Gold Coast, Queensland, Australia
- Genres: R&B; hip hop soul; blue-eyed soul
- Occupations: Singer; songwriter
- Years active: 2013–present
- Labels: RCA; Sony Australia
- Website: www.callmesaygrace.com

Grace Sewell (born 8 April 1997), known professionally as Saygrace (also written as SayGrace and stylised in all caps; formerly Grace), is an Australian singer. She is best known for "You Don't Own Me" (2015), a cover version of the 1963 Lesley Gore song, produced by Quincy Jones, Parker Ighile and featuring G-Eazy. The song, a single from her debut album with Regime Music Societe and RCA Records, was a number-one hit in Australia.

== Early life ==
Grace is from Brisbane and attended All Hallows' School and Our Lady of Lourdes Catholic Primary School, Sunnybank. She grew up listening to musical artists such as Smokey Robinson, Janis Joplin, Shirley Bassey, and Amy Winehouse. Grace comes from a family of musicians. Her grandparents toured with the Bee Gees. Her brother Conrad Sewell is also a singer/songwriter, best known for featuring on Kygo's song "Firestone" and for his solo hit "Start Again". When "Start Again" hit number one on the ARIA Charts in June 2015, Conrad and Grace became the first Australian born siblings in the history of the charts to hit number one as separate acts.

== Career ==
=== 2015–2018: Memo and FMA ===
She performed for Dropout Live UK, singing a cover of "Do It like a Dude" by Jessie J. Grace signed with Regime Music Societe and RCA Records in 2015 and began recording in Atlanta with Puff Daddy and Quincy Jones.

Grace released "You Don't Own Me" in March 2015 as a tribute to and cover of the original singer, Lesley Gore, who had recently died at the time. Grace recorded the song with rapper G-Eazy, with Quincy Jones returning to co-produce the track. It was her first single with RCA Records. The song became a top 10 viral track on Spotify in April 2015, and debuted at number 14 on the ARIA Singles Chart in May 2015, later peaking at number 1. She released her debut EP Memo in May 2016. In July 2015, she was picked as Elvis Duran's Artist of the Month and was featured on NBC's Today show hosted by Kathie Lee Gifford and Hoda Kotb and broadcast nationally where she performed live her single "You Don't Own Me". The song was used to promote the Australian TV series Love Child, and was used in Christmas advertisements for House of Fraser in the UK. In 2016, the song was used in the trailer for the film Suicide Squad. She also was shown performing the song on a season 3 episode of NCIS: New Orleans.

"You Don't Own Me" was included on Grace's debut studio album, FMA, which stands for Forgive My Attitude, was released on 1 July 2016. Grace also co-wrote a track for the album with Fraser T Smith, which features additional writing and production contributions from Parker Ighile, Diane Warren, and Quincy Jones. In September, she released the official single version of "Boyfriend Jeans" which had been included as a demo version on her debut EP, Memo. Grace was the featured artist on Live from Daryl's House on 16 June 2016.

=== 2019–present: The Defining Moments of Saygrace ===
In October 2019, Grace rebranded herself to Saygrace and released the single "Boys Ain't Shit". On 22 November 2019, she released the single "Doin' Too Much" and confirmed to Billboard the name of her EP, The Defining Moments of SayGrace: Girlhood, Fuckboys & Situationships, which was released on 7 February 2020.

== Discography ==
=== Studio albums ===
Title	Details	Peak chart positions			
Title	Details	AUS	CAN	UK	US
FMA	Released: 1 July 2016; Label: RCA; Formats: Digital download, CD	32	93	42	34

=== Extended plays ===
Title	Details	Peak chart positions
Title	Details	US
Memo	Released: 26 May 2015; Label: RCA; Formats: Digital download, CD	149
The Defining Moments of Saygrace: Girlhood, Fuckboys & Situationships	Released: 7 February 2020; Label: RCA; Formats: Digital download, CD, streaming	—
Deep Rest	Released: 31 May 2024; Label: Self-released; Formats: Digital download, streaming	—

=== Singles ===
Title	Year	Peak chart positions									Certifications	Album
Title	Year	AUS	BEL	CAN	IRL	NZ	SPA	SWI	UK	US	Certifications	Album
"You Don't Own Me" (as Grace featuring G-Eazy)	2015	1	42	45	13	5	19	60	4	57	ARIA: 4× Platinum; BPI: 2× Platinum; IFPI SWI: Gold; MC: 2× Platinum; RIAA: Platinum; RMNZ: 3× Platinum	Memo
"Dirty Harry" (as Grace)	2015	—	—	—	—	—	—	—	—	—		Memo
"Boyfriend Jeans" (as Grace)	2015	—	—	—	—	—	—	—	—	—		Memo
"Hell of a Girl" (as Grace)	2016	—	—	—	—	—	—	—	—	—		FMA
"Honor" (DJ Cassidy featuring Grace and Lil Yachty)	2017	—	—	—	—	—	—	—	—	—		Non-album single
"Boys Ain't Shit" (solo or featuring Tate McRae and Audrey Mika or featuring Flo Milli)	2019	—	—	—	86	— (Note: "Boys Ain't Shit" did not enter the NZ Top 40 Singles Chart, but peaked at number 17 on the NZ Hot Singles Chart.)	—	—	—	—	RMNZ: Gold	The Defining Moments of Saygrace: Girlhood, Fuckboys & Situationships
"Doin' Too Much"	2019	—	—	—	—	—	—	—	—	—		The Defining Moments of Saygrace: Girlhood, Fuckboys & Situationships
"Priorities"	2020	—	—	—	—	—	—	—	—	—		The Defining Moments of Saygrace: Girlhood, Fuckboys & Situationships
"Gone"	2020	—	—	—	—	—	—	—	—	—		The Defining Moments of Saygrace: Girlhood, Fuckboys & Situationships
"Girl"	2020	—	—	—	—	—	—	—	—	—		Non-album singles
"Feel Good"	2020	—	—	—	—	—	—	—	—	—		Non-album singles
"Used To"	2020	—	—	—	—	—	—	—	—	—		Non-album singles
"No Saving Us" (with Two Friends)	2023	—	—	—	—	—	—	—	—	—		Non-album singles
"Beggin You" (with Hayden James)	2023	—	—	—	—	—	—	—	—	—		Non-album singles
"Twentyfourseven"	2024	—	—	—	—	—	—	—	—	—		Deep Rest
"Daydreaming"	2024	—	—	—	—	—	—	—	—	—		Deep Rest
"Tragic"	2024	—	—	—	—	—	—	—	—	—		Deep Rest
"Mailly"	2024	—	—	—	—	—	—	—	—	—		Deep Rest
"Stay Down"	2024	—	—	—	—	—	—	—	—	—		
"—" denotes a single that did not chart or was not released in that territory.

=== Other appearances ===
Title	Year	Other artist(s)	Album
"Love Me or Leave Me"	2015	—N/a	Nina Revisited... A Tribute to Nina Simone
"Don't Let Me Go"	2015	G-Eazy	When It's Dark Out

=== Music videos ===
Title	Year	Director
"You Don't Own Me" (featuring G-Eazy)	2015	Saul Salmonman
"Boyfriend Jeans"	2015	Ellis Bahl
"Dirty Harry"	2015	Ellis Bahl
"Hell of a Girl"	2016	—N/a
"Boys Ain't Shit"	2019	Mercedes Bryce Morgan
"Doin' Too Much"	2019	Mercedes Bryce Morgan
"Gone"	2019	Mercedes Bryce Morgan
