= Jinny Osborn =

American singer

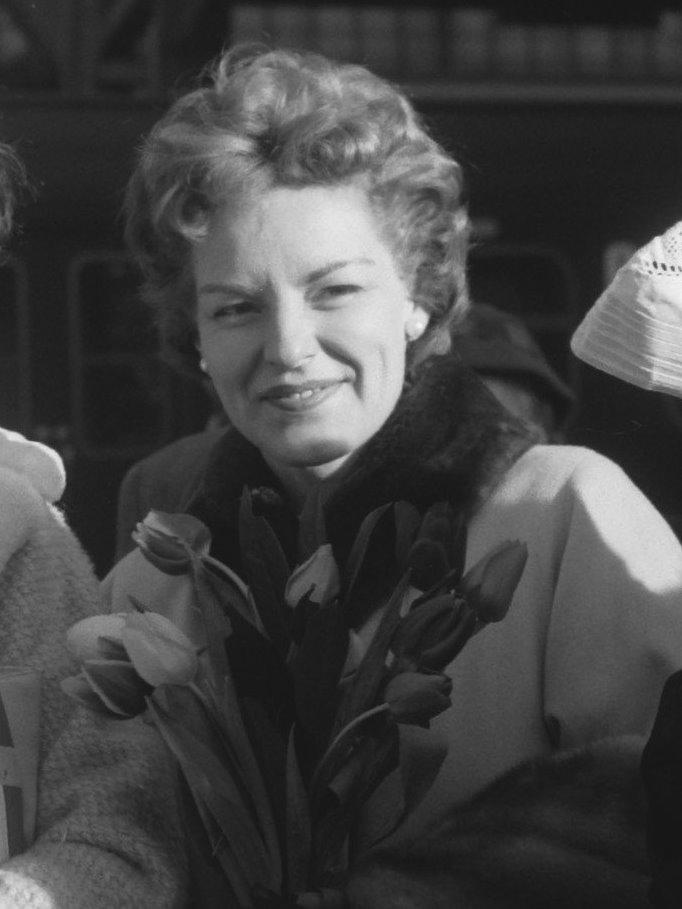
- Osborn in 1959
- Born: Virginia A. Cole; April 25, 1927; Seattle, Washington, U.S.
- Died: May 19, 2003 (aged 76); Palm Springs, California, U.S.
- Occupation: Singer
- Musical career
- Genres: Barbershop; folk; traditional pop
- Instrument: Vocals
- Years active: 1946–1961
- Labels: Columbia; Cadence

Jinny Osborn (born Virginia Cole; April 25, 1927 – May 19, 2003) was an American popular music singer. She founded the group the Chordettes with three friends in 1946, which became one of the longest-lasting American vocal groups of the mid-20th century. Her final departure in 1961 led to the group's dissolution.

== Early life and education ==
Osborn was born to Orlan H. "King" Cole and Katherine Flack in Seattle and grew up in Sheboygan, Wisconsin. Her father was president of the Barbershop Harmony Society, and is also remembered today as the founder of the "Clipper City Chordsmen" of Manitowoc. He was also the president of the Kingsbury Breweries Company.

Osborn attended Shimer College, which at the time was a four-year junior college, for the 11th and 12th grades, graduating in 1945. Shimer was well known for its music program, and Osborn majored in music in addition to playing violin in a student group that performed in nearby towns.

== Musical career ==
Osborn and three friends (Janet Ertel, Alice Mae Buschmann Spielvogel, and Dorothy Schwartz) formed the Chordettes in 1946, with Osborn singing tenor. Alice Spielvogel was replaced by Carol Buschmann, her sister-in-law, in 1947. In 1952, Lynn Evans (née Hargate; May 2, 1924 – February 6, 2020) replaced Schwartz. And in 1953, Margie Needham replaced Osborn (who was having a baby), though Osborn later returned to the group. Nancy Overton was also a member of the group at a later time.

Initially they did principally folk music in the barbershop quartet style, though they gradually adopted more conventional pop forms. The group gained prominence when they appeared on the television show Arthur Godfrey's Talent Scouts in 1949, returning as regular guests over the next four years. In 1953, Godfrey replaced their act with the McGuire Sisters.

In the same year, Osborn left the group to have a daughter, thereby missing appearing on the recording of "Mr. Sandman". She was temporarily replaced by Margie Needham.

Osborn did however appear on several of the group's subsequent major hits, including "Born to be With You" (1956), "Just Between You and Me" (1957) and "Lollipop" (1958). She also appeared in the group's appearance on the very first episode of American Bandstand in 1957.

== Later life and legacy ==
After the breakup of The Chordettes, Osborn lived in southern California and largely avoided public life. However, she continued to sing in informal barbershop quartet groups, including annual gatherings in Chicago.

She died of cancer on May 19, 2003, in Palm Springs.

== Works cited ==
- "Jinny Osborn". Radio and Television Mirror: 47 & 84. July 1950.
- Averill, Gage (2003). Four Parts, No Waiting : A Social History of American Barbershop Quartet. Oxford University Press. p. 225. ISBN 9780195328936.
