= I'll Cry If I Want To =

Studio album by Lesley Gore
- Released: June 1963
- Recorded: March 30 – May 21, 1963
- Studio: Bell Sound Studios, A&R Recording, New York City
- Genre: Pop
- Length: 26:04
- Label: Mercury
- Producer: Quincy Jones

Lesley Gore chronology
I'll Cry If I Want To (1963)	Lesley Gore Sings of Mixed-Up Hearts (1963)

Singles from I'll Cry if I Want to
- 1. "“It's My Party” / ”Danny”" Released: April 5, 1963; 2. ""Judy's Turn to Cry” / “Just Let Me Cry”" Released: June 21, 1963

I'll Cry If I Want To is the debut album of Lesley Gore. The album included her hit singles "It's My Party" and its follow-up, "Judy's Turn to Cry". The album was rushed out after "It's My Party" became a big hit, and the songs are mostly about crying, linking to the hit single's first line "It's my party and I'll cry if I want to", incorporating songs with titles such as "Cry", "Just Let Me Cry" and "Cry and You Cry Alone". Besides the hit singles, the album included pop standards such as "Misty", "Cry Me a River" and "What Kind of Fool Am I?". The album reached number 24 on the US Billboard 200. Edsel Records released the album on Compact Disc in 2000 in combination with Gore's second album, Lesley Gore Sings of Mixed-Up Hearts. The album was named the 181st best album of the 1960s by Pitchfork.

== Track listing ==
Side one
No.	Title	Writer(s)	Length
1.	"It's My Party"	Walter Gold, John Gluck Jr., Herb Weiner, Seymour Gottlieb	2:20
2.	"Cry Me a River"	Arthur Hamilton	2:14
3.	"Cry"	Churchill Kohlman	2:05
4.	"Just Let Me Cry"	Ben Raleigh, Mark Barkan	2:18
5.	"Cry and You Cry Alone"	Hilda H. Earnhart	2:02
6.	"No More Tears (Left to Cry)"	Mark Barkan, Sandy Baron	2:23

Side two
No.	Title	Writer(s)	Length
7.	"Judy's Turn to Cry"	Beverly Ross, Edna Lewis	2:23
8.	"I Understand"	Kim Gannon, Mabel Wayne	1:53
9.	"I Would"	Kurt Feltz, Edna Lewis, Werner Scharfenberger	2:24
10.	"Misty"	Erroll Garner, Johnny Burke	2:19
11.	"What Kind of Fool Am I?"	Leslie Bricusse, Anthony Newley	1:43
12.	"The Party's Over"	Jule Styne, Betty Comden, Adolph Green	2:00

== Charts ==
Weekly chart performance for I'll Cry If I Want To
Chart (1963)	Peak position
US Billboard 200	24

Singles

Year	Single	Chart	Position
1963	"It's My Party"	US Billboard Hot 100	1
1963	"It's My Party"	US R&B Singles	1
1963	"Judy's Turn to Cry"	US Billboard Hot 100	5
1963	"Judy's Turn to Cry"	US R&B Singles	10
