= Cloudy with a Chance of Meatballs (soundtrack) =

Cloudy with a Chance of Meatballs (Original Motion Picture Soundtrack)

Soundtrack album by Mark Mothersbaugh
- Released: September 15, 2009
- Recorded: 2009
- Venue: London
- Studio: AIR Studios; Angel Recording Studios; Abbey Road Studios; Henry Wood Hall
- Genre: Film score; film soundtrack
- Length: 65:16
- Label: Madison Gate Records
- Producer: Mark Mothersbaugh

Mark Mothersbaugh chronology
Fanboys (2009)	Cloudy with a Chance of Meatballs (2009)	Circle of Eight (2009)

Singles from Cloudy with a Chance of Meatballs (Original Motion Picture Soundtrack)
- 1. "Raining Sunshine" Released: August 25, 2009

Cloudy with a Chance of Meatballs (Original Motion Picture Soundtrack) is the soundtrack album to the 2009 animated science fiction comedy film Cloudy with a Chance of Meatballs directed by Phil Lord and Christopher Miller. The film score is composed by Mark Mothersbaugh and released through Madison Gate Records on September 15, 2009.

== Background ==
Cloudy with a Chance of Meatballs marked the first collaboration between Mark Mothersbaugh and the Lord and Miller duo. Mothersbaugh was shortlisted as one of the composers, as the director duo liked Mothersbaugh's works. Initially, Mothersbaugh wrote a song titled "No Place Like Home" that was intended to be included in the film, as the main theme. He wrote more original music, and came up with a different theme that became the main theme for the film. The track "No Place Like Home" was later included in Devo's album Something for Everybody (2010). The score was recorded at London. Madison Gate Records released the soundtrack album on September 15, 2009.

The album featured an original song "Raining Sunshine" by Miranda Cosgrove and a newer version of "Sunshine, Lollipops and Rainbows" by Lesley Gore. The former was released as a single on August 25, 2009. A Japanese version of the song is titled "Rainbow Forecast" by Shoko Nakagawa.

== Reception ==
Jonathan Broxton of Movie Music UK wrote "Really, other than some of the more off the wall electronics, the only thing hampering Cloudy With a Chance of Meatballs is it's haphazard and scattershot nature. Cues often change direction style multiple times within the space of two or three minutes, giving the entire score a breathless, slightly unfocused feel. It's the nature of the beast when it comes to scoring for animated films, especially when half the audience probably has ADD, but it's a real shame as the actual thematic content is lovely, and would have benefitted greatly from an extended performance here and there in order for the listener to get a feel for what Mothersbaugh was trying to achieve."

Reviewer based at ScoreNotes wrote "If you would like to be swept up in a wave of uplifting and charming music, put some Meatballs on your plate. It's a fun and unique jaunt. I think you'll find this score to trump even the likes of a Danny Elfman or Randy Newman from this arena." Filmtracks wrote "On the whole, ten minutes of compilation-worthy material may not be worth the entire "CD on demand" and download product, one bracketed by unfortunate song performances. Save "Meatier Shower" for desert and politely pick away at the rest." Daniel M. Gold of The New York Times called it a "wonderfully dynamic" score.

== Track listing ==
All music is composed by Mark Mothersbaugh except where noted.

No.	Title	Music	Performer	Length
1.	"Raining Sunshine"	Matthew Gerrard; Jay Landers; Charlie Midnight	Miranda Cosgrove	3:44
2.	"Swallow Falls"			0:47
3.	"Introducing Flint"			4:16
4.	"The Latest Invention"			1:23
5.	"The Mayor/Earl Warns Flint"			1:17
6.	"Sam's Big Break"			0:50
7.	"Powering Up"			1:05
8.	"Failure Again"			1:54
9.	"Meatier Shower"			3:10
10.	"A Father's Love"			1:19
11.	"Ice Cream Wonderland"			1:22
12.	"Snowball!"			1:15
13.	"The Mayor's Big Plan"			1:16
14.	"Activation and the Jell-O Dome"			1:39
15.	"Sam and Flint Bond"			2:00
16.	"Doubting Dad/Mutations"			2:57
17.	"The Spaghetti Twister"			3:08
18.	"Aftermath"			2:26
19.	"Flint's Determination"			2:44
20.	"The Food Storm"			2:08
21.	"The Mission Begins"			2:36
22.	"Outside the Meatball"			1:57
23.	"Inside the Meatball"			1:39
24.	"Earl Takes Charge"			2:00
25.	"Sentient Chickens"			2:42
26.	"Worldwide Chaos"			0:57
27.	"Anaphylactic Love"			1:41
28.	"Attack of the Gummi Bears"			1:40
29.	"Here's the Cheese"			1:25
30.	"The Heart of the Meatball"			1:17
31.	"Spray-On Triumph"			1:55
32.	"Flint Returns"			3:31
33.	"Sunshine, Lollipops and Rainbows"	Marvin Hamlisch; Howard Liebling	Lesley Gore	1:37
Total length:				65:16

== Personnel ==
- Music composer and producer – Mark Mothersbaugh
- Conductor – James T. Sale
- Orchestrator – Bill Boston, Christopher Guardino, James T. Sale, Richard Bronskill
- Recording and mixing – Brad Haenhel

== Accolades ==
Awards	Category	Recipient(s) and nominee(s)	Result	Ref.
ASCAP Film and Television Music Awards	Top Box Office Films	Mark Mothersbaugh	Won	
BMI Film & TV Awards	BMI Film Music Awards	Mark Mothersbaugh	Nominated	
