= Lois Sasson =

American jewelry designer (1940–2020)

- Born: Lois Diane Kahaner; April 28, 1940; New York City, U.S.
- Died: December 30, 2020 (aged 80); New York City, U.S.
- Spouse: Raymond Sasson (divorced)
- Partner: Lesley Gore (1982–2015; her death)

Lois Diane Sasson (née Kahaner; April 28, 1940 – December 30, 2020) was an American jewelry designer, gay rights activist, and longtime partner of singer-songwriter Lesley Gore.

== Early life and education ==
Lois Sasson was born Lois Diane Kahaner on April 28, 1940, in Brooklyn, New York City. Sol, her father, imported fine lace, and Helen (Seiden) Kahaner, her mother, was a homemaker. Lois grew up in Jamaica Estates in Queens, New York City. She went to Mount Ida Junior College in Newton, Massachusetts, and then New York University.

== Career ==
Her career in jewelry design began to grow in the 1970s. Her work was featured in New York magazine. Sasson created high-end jewelry, sometimes designed in partnership with Geoffrey Thomas, sold in stores such as Bergdorf Goodman. She also had some of her work on display in art galleries. By 2015, Sasson became well known for her work with precious stones, encrusted cufflinks, and tuxedo button covers. On Valentine's Day that year a set of men's jewelry called "The Ambassador Set" went on sale for $16,000.

=== Philanthropy ===
Sasson designed and donated "Compassion" cufflinks in support of the Center for the Advancement of Women. She also donated 35% of jewelry sales received at a benefit for a woman with aplastic anemia in 2013.

== Personal life ==
Her early marriage to Raymond Sasson ended in divorce. Lois lived with her partner, singer Lesley Gore ("It's My Party"), whom she started dating in 1982 until Gore's death in 2015.

Sasson died from the effects of COVID-19 in New York City on December 30, 2020. She was 80, and her only surviving family member was her sister Susan Kahaner.
