= For Me and My Gal (song) =

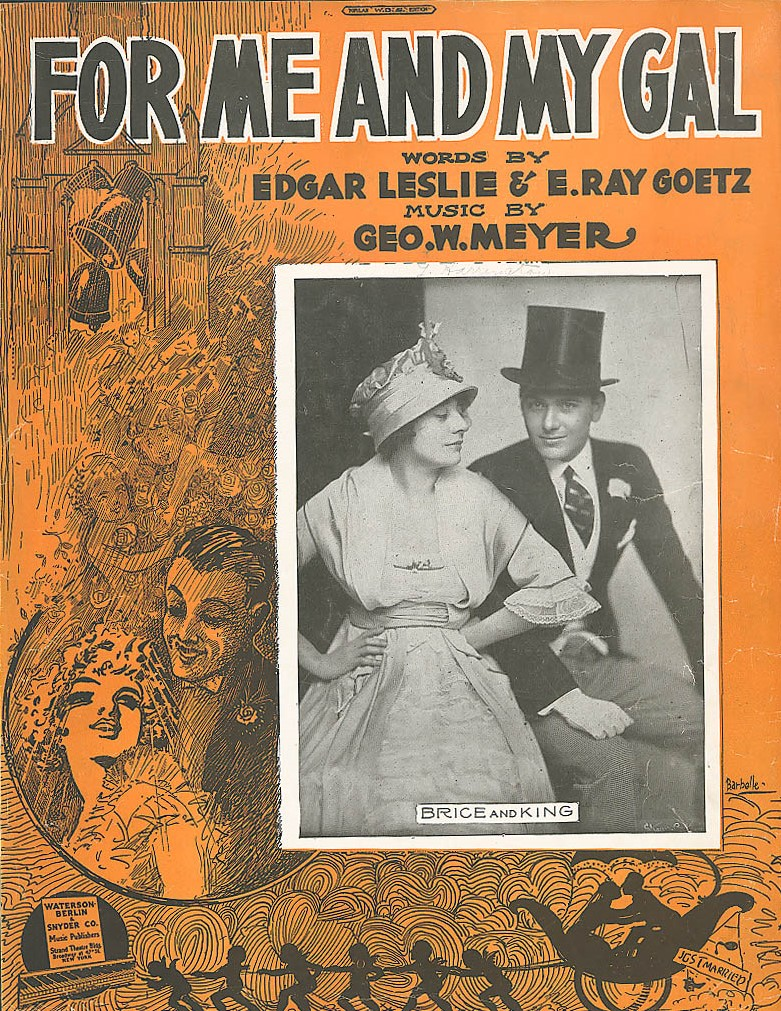
- Sheet music cover featuring Elizabeth Brice and Charles King, 1917

Song
- Written: 1917
- Composer: George W. Meyer
- Lyricists: Edgar Leslie, E. Ray Goetz

"For Me and My Gal" is a 1917 popular standard song by George W. Meyer with lyrics by Edgar Leslie and E. Ray Goetz. Popular recordings of the song in 1917 were by Van and Schenck; Prince's Orchestra; Henry Burr and Albert Campbell; and by Billy Murray.

This song was used in the 1942 film of the same name, where it is the first song that Jo Hayden (Judy Garland) and Harry Palmer (Gene Kelly) perform together. The Decca single release of the Garland/Kelly version was a major hit in 1942.

== Other versions ==
- Guy Lombardo and his Orchestra (vocal by Kenny Gardner). This charted briefly in 1943.
- Al Jolson recorded it on June 11, 1947 for Decca Records. The song was used in the film Jolson Sings Again when it was performed by Larry Parks (dubbed by Al Jolson).
- The Chordettes - included in their album The Chordettes Sing Your Requests (1954).
- Perry Como - included in his album So Smooth (1955).
- Freddy Cannon - a single release in 1961 (Swan 4083). (Freddy Cannon#Singles).
- Burl Ives - included in his album My Gal Sal and Other Favorites (1965).
- Harry Nilsson - included in his album A Little Touch of Schmilsson in the Night (1973).

== Accolades ==
The Garland/Kelly recording of "For Me and My Gal" was inducted into the Grammy Hall of Fame in 2010.
