= Lynn Evans Mand =

American singer (1924–2020)

Lynn Evans
- Born: Carolyn Marie Hartgate; May 2, 1924; Youngstown, Ohio, U.S.
- Died: February 6, 2020 (aged 95); Elyria, Ohio, U.S.
- Occupations: Singer; Teacher
- Musical career
- Genres: Traditional pop; doo wop
- Years active: 1953–1961

Lynn Evans Mand (born Carolyn Marie Hartgate; May 2, 1924 – February 6, 2020) was an American popular singer who was the lead singer of The Chordettes. She and the quartet achieved national acclaim for performing "Mr. Sandman" and "Lollipop", both of which became instant hit songs during the 1950s and 1960s.

== Early life ==
Carolyn Marie Hartgate was born on May 2, 1924, in Youngstown, Ohio. She was the daughter of George Hartgate, a steelworker, and Caroline (née Williams) Hartgate, a homemaker. As a young girl, Hartgate studied piano and sang with her family. She graduated high school in 1942 and attended Ohio Wesleyan University, obtaining a Bachelor of Arts degree in education in 1946. That same year, she married Robert B. Evans.

== The Chordettes ==
Mand worked for the American Red Cross and was a singer with an amateur barbershop quartet when, in 1953, she auditioned for a role in the Chordettes. The group was impressed by her voice and appointed her to replace Dorothy Schwartz. She was a member of the quartet for twelve years, using the name "Lynn" as there had already been a member of the group named Carol. The group would perform with stars including Dean Martin, Jerry Lewis, in addition to appearing on The Ed Sullivan Show and American Bandstand.

== Later life and death ==
The Chordettes broke up in the early 1960s, though members of the group remained friends. Mand worked as a special education teacher in the Brentwood School District, earning a Master of Arts in the field from Hofstra University in 1969. She would move back to Ohio, where she died on February 6, 2020, in Elyria.
