= Church on Sunday =

Church on Sunday may refer to:

- "Church on Sunday", a 2016 song by Grace from FMA
- "Church on Sunday", a 2000 song by Green Day from Warning
- Church on Sunday, a 2019 album by Blac Youngsta
