= She's a Fool =

Single by Lesley Gore

from the album Lesley Gore Sings of Mixed-Up Hearts
- B-side: "The Old Crowd"
- Released: September 3, 1963
- Recorded: July 10, 1963
- Genre: R&B
- Label: Mercury
- Songwriters: Mark Barkan; Ben Raleigh
- Producer: Quincy Jones

Lesley Gore singles chronology
"Judy's Turn to Cry" (1963)	"She's a Fool" (1963)	"You Don't Own Me" (1963)

"She's a Fool" is a song written by Mark Barkan and Ben Raleigh that was originally recorded by Lesley Gore in 1963; it appeared as a single and on the album Lesley Gore Sings of Mixed-Up Hearts. Quincy Jones was the producer.

== Background ==
The lyrics of "She's a Fool" tell of a romantic triangle. The singer is upset that the boy she likes is being treated poorly by his current girlfriend. Allmusic critic Richie Unterberger believes that the tune's success was crucial to Gore's career because it was dissimilar lyrically and musically from the two singles with crying themes that preceded it, and thus she was able to avoid being typecast. Unterbeger praises the song as "a good girl-group single," and remarks on its "light jazzy swing" and catchy melody. The production incorporates handclaps, tympani, Piano, drums, strings, and female backup singers, as well as what Unterberger describes as "low, grumbled responsive male vocals that followed Gore's declaration of "she's a fool, with the repeated words: "SHAG-A-DOO-LA"." The music moves to a higher key by half a step, From B Flat to B for the final verse, as well as again, from B to C, in the final repeat of the Chorus,, Gore sings a wordless counterpoint melody, before the fade, in common with many rock songs from the 1960s. According to co-writer Mark Barkan, on the 60’s music podcast “The Millennial Throwback Machine”, Mark was initially inspired by the Freddy Cannon song “He’s A Fool” to write a potential answer record from a female's perspective, and he had first played the song to the Tokens as a potential follow up to their hit "One Fine Day" (for their group the Chiffons). The Tokens laughed him out of their office, so when he pitched the song to Claus Ogerman, who in return pitched it to Lesley Gore, Lesley liked it, and she herself suggested the modulation for the later part of the song, as that was not included originally. Mark had first co-written the B side to Lesley Gore's “Judy’s Turn To Cry” and that's how his association with Lesley began.

Cash Box described it as an "infectious, shuffle-rock romantic weeper" that "Lesley puts across with teen finesse" and with a "potent Claus Ogerman arrangement."

== Chart performance ==
The single reached #5 on the Billboard Hot 100 and #26 on Billboard's R&B singles chart. It was Gore's second straight single to reach #5, following "Judy's Turn to Cry." It was also her third of four consecutive singles to reach the Top 5 to start her career, "It's My Party" reaching #1 before "Judy's Turn to Cry" and "You Don't Own Me" following "She's a Fool" and going to #2.

== Charts ==
Chart (1963)	Peak position
US Billboard Hot 100	5
US US R&B Singles	26

== Popular culture ==
Subsequent to its initial release as a single and on Lesley Gore Sings of Mixed-Up Hearts, "She's a Fool" has been released on compilation albums including The Golden Hits of Lesley Gore in 1965, It's My Party: The Mercury Anthology in 1996, Sunshine, Lollipops, and Rainbows: The Best of Lesley Gore in 1998, 20th Century Masters – The Millennium Collection in 2000 and The Ultimate Collection 1963-1968: Start the Party Again in 2005. The song has also been included on such 1960s song compilations as Back to the '60s, Vol. 3, 1960's Rock N Roll and The Girl's Sound: Fifty Hits 1957-1966.
