= Cloudy with a Chance of Meatballs (disambiguation) =

Cloudy with a Chance of Meatballs is a 1978 children's book by Judi and Ron Barrett.

Cloudy with a Chance of Meatballs may also refer to:

- Cloudy with a Chance of Meatballs (film), the 2009 film based on the book
  - Cloudy with a Chance of Meatballs (franchise), the resulting film franchise
  - Cloudy with a Chance of Meatballs (TV series), the 2017 TV series based on the film
  - Cloudy with a Chance of Meatballs (video game), the 2009 video game based on the film
  - Cloudy with a Chance of Meatballs (soundtrack), 2009 soundtrack of the same name of the film
