= Harmony Encores =

Album by The Chordettes

Studio album by The Chordettes
- Released: 1952
- Recorded: May–June, 1952
- Genre: Traditional pop
- Label: Columbia
- Producer: Archie Bleyer

The Chordettes chronology
Harmony Encores (1952)	The Chordettes Sing Your Requests (1954)

Harmony Encores is an album recorded by The Chordettes and released in 1952 by Columbia Records as catalog number CL-6218.

This album was reissued, together with The Chordettes Sing Your Requests, as a compact disc in 2002.

== Track listing ==
No.	Title	Writer(s)	Length
1.	"Carolina Moon"	Benny Davis/Joe Burke
2.	"Basin Street Blues"	Spencer Williams
3.	"Floatin' Down to Cotton Town"	Harold G. Frost/Henri F. Kickman
4.	"Drifting and Dreaming"	Haven Gillespie/Erwin R. Schmidt/Egbert Van Alstyne/Loyal Curtis
5.	"Garden in the Rain"	James Dyrenforth/Carroll Gibbons
6.	"S'posin'"	Andy Rezaf/Paul Denniker
7.	"The Sweetheart of Sigma Chi"	Byron D. Stokes/F. Dudleigh Vernor
8.	"Kentucky Babe"	Richard Buck/Adam Geibel
9.	"In the Sweet Long Ago"	Arthur Lange/Bobby Heath/Alfred Solman
10.	"I'm Drifting Back to Dreamland"	Charles F. Harrison/Florence M. Charlesworth/Jack Sadler
11.	"Angry"	Dudley Mecum/Henry Brunies/Merritt Brunies/Jules Cassard
12.	"A Little Street Where Old Friends Meet"	Gus Kahn/Harry M. Woods
13.	"The Anniversary Waltz"	Al Dubin/Dave Franklin
14.	"Sentimental Journey"	Les Brown/Ben Homer/Bud Green
