= Zorro (song) =

Single by The Chordettes
- B-side: "Love Is a Two-Way Street"
- Released: April 1958
- Genre: Pop
- Length: 2:00
- Label: Cadence; 1349
- Songwriter(s): Norman Foster, George Bruns

The Chordettes singles chronology
"Lollipop" (February 1958)	"Zorro" (1958)	"No Other Arms, No Other Lips" (January 1959)

"Zorro" is a song written by Norman Foster and George Bruns and performed by The Chordettes. In 1958, the track reached No. 17 on the Billboard Hot 100 and No. 17 in Canada.

The song was a version of the theme from the TV series Zorro. It was first recorded by The Mellomen.
