= Lesley Gore Sings of Mixed-Up Hearts =

Studio album by Lesley Gore
- Released: November 1963
- Recorded: March 30; September 21–25, 1963
- Studio: A&R Recording, New York City
- Genre: Pop
- Length: 31:25
- Label: Mercury
- Producer: Quincy Jones

Lesley Gore chronology
I'll Cry If I Want To (1963)	Lesley Gore Sings of Mixed-Up Hearts (1963)	Boys, Boys, Boys (1964)

Singles from Lesley Gore Sings of Mixed-Up Hearts
- 1. "She's a Fool"/"The Old Crowd"" Released: September 3, 1963; 2. "You Don't Own Me"/"Run Bobby Run"" Released: December 11, 1963; 3. "Sunshine, Lollipops, and Rainbows"/"You've Come Back"" Released: May 18, 1965

Lesley Gore Sings of Mixed-Up Hearts, also known as Sings of Mixed-Up Hearts, is the second studio album by Lesley Gore. It was released in 1963 as the follow-up to her debut album I'll Cry If I Want To.

Allmusic critic Richie Unterberger considers Lesley Gore Sings of Mixed-Up Hearts to be better than I'll Cry If I Want To and an "above average" though not excellent 1963 pop/rock album. Unterberger cites as a reason for being preferable to I'll Cry If I Want To that Lesley Gore Sings of Mixed-Up Hearts avoids the self-pity theme of the debut album. Unterberger also praises the album's three big hits, "She's a Fool", "You Don't Own Me" and "Sunshine, Lollipops, and Rainbows". "She's a Fool" and "You Don't Own Me" both reached the Top 5 on the Billboard Hot 100 in 1963. "Sunshine, Lollipops, and Rainbows", released as a single two years later, reached #13. Unterberger also praised the songs "If That's the Way You Want It" and "Run, Bobby, Run" for being "good moody girl group ditties" which benefited from Quincy Jones's production, but he rated the pop ballads "Fools Rush In" and "Young and Foolish" as being "pedestrian".

== Track listing ==
Side one
No.	Title	Writer(s)	Length
1.	"She's a Fool"	Mark Barkan, Ben Raleigh	2:08
2.	"The Old Crowd"	Gerry Goffin, Carole King	2:27
3.	"Fools Rush In (Where Angels Fear to Tread)"	Rube Bloom, Johnny Mercer	2:20
4.	"Hello, Young Lover (You Ain't Gonna Get My Heart)"	Paul Anka	2:23
5.	"My Foolish Heart"	Ned Washington, Victor Young	3:19
6.	"Sunshine, Lollipops and Rainbows"	Marvin Hamlisch, Howard Liebling	1:37

Side two
No.	Title	Writer(s)	Length
7.	"You Don't Own Me"	John Madara, David White	2:26
8.	"Run, Bobby, Run"	Mark Barkan, Ben Raleigh	3:11
9.	"Young and Foolish"	Albert Hague, Arnold Horwitt	2:45
10.	"I Struck a Match"	Arthur Resnick, Bobby Scott	3:16
11.	"If That's the Way You Want It"	Edna Lewis, Gloria Shayne	2:26
12.	"Time to Go"	Mark Barkan, Ben Raleigh	3:07

== Charts ==
Album

Year	Chart	Position
1963	US Billboard 200	125

Singles

Year	Single	Chart	Position
1963	"She's a Fool"	US Billboard Hot 100	5
1963	"She's a Fool"	US R&B Singles	26
1963	"You Don't Own Me"	US Billboard Hot 100	2
1965	"Sunshine, Lollipops, and Rainbows"	US Billboard Hot 100	13
