= Memo (EP) =

EP by Grace
- Released: 26 May 2015
- Label: RCA; Sony
- Producer: Grace Sewell; Parker Ighile; Quincy Jones; Alex Vickery

Grace chronology
Memo (2015)	FMA (2016)

Singles from Memo
- 1. "You Don't Own Me" Released: 17 March 2015; 2. "Dirty Harry" Released: 26 May 2015; 3. "Boyfriend Jeans" Released: 25 September 2015

Memo is the debut extended play by Australian singer Grace. It released on 26 May 2015 through RCA.

== Critical reception ==
Meggie Morris from Renowned for Sound said "Citing her biggest influences as soul legends Minnie Riperton and Gladys Knight, as well as modern-day sirens Lauryn Hill and Amy Winehouse, it's no surprise that Grace's own musical vision centres on a soulful sound and dynamic, raw vocals that navigate a space between retro charm and contemporary relevance."

== Track listing ==
No.	Title	Writer(s)	Producer(s)	Length
1.	"Dirty Harry"	Anita Brown; Grace Sewell; Parker Ighile	Parker Ighile; Grace Sewell	3:03
2.	"Feel Your Love"	Al Johnson; Charles Hinshaw; Parker Ighile; Sewell	Parker Ighile; Grace Sewell	2:55
3.	"You Don't Own Me" (featuring G-Eazy)	John Madara; Dave White; Gerald Gillum	Quincy Jones; Ighile	3:21
4.	"The Honey"	Gwendolyn Fuqua; Kenneth Gamble; Marvin Gaye; Sandra Greene; Leon Huff; Parker Ighile; Sewell	Ighile	4:09
5.	"Memo (Boyfriend Jeans)"	Sewell; Alex Vickery	Sewell; Vickery	3:39

== Charts ==
Chart (2015)	Peak position
US Billboard 200	149

== Release history ==
Region	Date	Format	Label	Catalogue
Australia	26 May 2015	CD; digital download	RCA/Sony Music Australia	88875120452
USA	13 May 2016	CD; digital download	RCA	8898532807
