= The Ormsby Brothers =

- Origin: Waikato, New Zealand
- Genres: Pop music
- Years active: 1972-1975
- Labels: His Master's Voice; EMI Music
- Past members: Neville, Michael Adrian Ormsby

The Ormsby Brothers were a short-lived New-Zealand-Australian musical group, most famous for their version of "You Don't Own Me" which peaked at number 5 in Australia in mid-1973.

The Ormsby Brothers are from New Zealand's Waikato region.

The group's debut single was a cover of "I Saw Mummy Kissing Santa Claus" on the His Master's Voice label. The song did not chart.

In May 1973, the group released "You Don't Own Me", which peaked at number 5 on the Australian charts. "Sweet Virginia" followed and a self-titled album was released.

== Discography ==
=== Studio albums ===
Title	Album details
The Ormsby Brothers	Released: 1973; Format: LP; Label: EMI Music (EMC-2509)

=== Singles ===
List of singles, with Australian chart positions
Year	Title	Peak chart positions	Album
Year	Title	AUS	Album
1972	"I Saw Mummy Kissing Santa Claus"	-	non album single
1973	"You Don't Own Me"	5	The Ormsby Brothers
1973	"Sweet Virginia"	80	The Ormsby Brothers
1974	"The Sun Ain't Gonna Shine Anymore"	93	The Ormsby Brothers
1974	"Bad Day for Love"	-	non album single
1975	"God Knows I've Tried"	76	non album single
