= The Chordettes Sing Your Requests =

Studio album by The Chordettes
- Released: 1954
- Recorded: August–September 1953
- Genre: Traditional pop
- Label: Columbia

The Chordettes chronology
Harmony Encores (1952)	The Chordettes Sing Your Requests (1954)

Singles from The Chordettes Sing Your Requests
- 1. "Mr. Sandman" Released: October 1954

The Chordettes Sing Your Requests is an album recorded by The Chordettes and released in 1954 by Columbia Records as catalog number CL-6285.

This album was reissued, together with Harmony Encores, on compact disc in 2002.

== Track listing ==
1. "Wait Till the Sun Shines, Nellie" (Andrew B. Sterling/Harry Von Tilzer)
2. "They Say It's Wonderful" (Irving Berlin)
3. "I Wonder Who's Kissing Her Now" (Frank R. Adams/Will M. Hough/Harold Orlob/Joseph E. Howard)
4. "For Me and My Gal" (Edgar Leslie/Ray E. Goetz/George W. Meyer)
5. "I Believe" (Irving Graham/Al Stillman/Jimmy Shirl/Ervin Drake)
6. "Down Among the Sheltering Palms" (James Brockman/Abe Olman)
7. "Hello! Ma Baby" (Ida Emerson/Joseph E. Howard/Louis C. Singer)
8. "Wonderful One" (Ferde Grofé/Paul Whiteman/Theodora Morse)
9. "(When It's) Darkness in the Delta" (Jerry Livingston/Al J. Neiburg/Marty Symes)
