= FMA (album) =

Studio album by Grace
- Released: 1 July 2016
- Genre: Blue-eyed soul; pop; R&B
- Length: 48:36
- Label: RCA; Sony
- Producer: Da Internz; Philip Constable; Parker Ighile; Quincy Jones; Kassa Alexander; Mike Riley; Fraser T Smith; Byron Thomas; R!O; Naughty Boy

Grace chronology
Memo (2015)	FMA (2016)	The Defining Moments of SayGrace: Girlhood, Fuckboys & Situationships (2020)

Singles from FMA
- 1. "Hell of a Girl" Released: 13 May 2016

FMA (an abbreviation for Forgive My Attitude) is the debut studio album by Australian singer Grace, released on 1 July 2016 by RCA. It follows the release of her debut extended play (EP) Memo in May 2015.

== Critical reception ==
Harriet Gibsone of The Guardian said "While not yet a household name, the voice of 19-year-old Grace Sewell rang out through millions of living rooms last Christmas. Covering Lesley Gore's 1963 anthem 'You Don't Own Me' for House of Fraser's festive ad campaign, her lofty, billowing rendition climbed the charts through sheer omnipresence. Instead of relying on the song's success and rushing out an album, however, the Australian singer's debut arrives six months later, powered by her full-throttle voice and sultry, coffee-table soul. Although there are elements of the calculated vintage balladry of Meghan Trainor, Sewell's lyrics borrow more from Amy Winehouse's broken-hearted woes ('I drink so much / I guess it’s called love'). In spite of its title, which stands for Forgive My Attitude, there's a subtlety to her songs – which range across languid bossa nova, jazz and neo-soul – that suggests she is better suited to sophisticated songwriting than shifting scarves."

Rolling Stone Australia's Jules Lefevre claimed "At the highest points of FMA – which are also the most subdued – Grace Sewell touches a maturity that should belong to a 49-year-old, not someone of 19. Her vocals, a bright mix of husk and honey, drift inexorably close to the untouchable Amy Winehouse on tracks that at times eerily resemble the late singer's debut, Frank. Grace has been quietly assembling FMA for the better part of two years, with help from a glittering cast of producers, including legendary Quincy Jones. The first half is a little rocky: big and brassy soul rubs against dark and demure jazz lines with varying results. But when it's good, it's really good: 'From You' is a devastating love song, and 'New Orleans' is neo jazz for the dead of night."

== Commercial performance ==
The album debuted in the United States at number 34 on the Billboard 200, with 12,000 album equivalent units, 6,000 of which are traditional album sales.

== Singles ==
- "Hell of a Girl", was released on 13 May 2016 as the album's only single. It charted at number 55 in Scotland.

The album also includes two previously released singles, originally on Memo in 2015. "You Don't Own Me", a cover of Lesley Gore's 1963 hit song, was released on 17 March 2015. It features American rapper G-Eazy, and has become a hit, peaking at number one in Australia, number four in the United Kingdom, number five in New Zealand, and number 58 in the United States. "Boyfriend Jeans" was released on 25 September 2015.

== Track listing ==
No.	Title	Writer(s)	Producer(s)	Length
1.	"Church on Sunday"	Grace Sewell; Marcos Palacios; Ernest Clark; Charles Hinshaw Jr.	Da Internz	3:42
2.	"Hell of a Girl"	Sewell; Philip Constable; Hinshaw Jr.	Constable	3:28
3.	"Hope You Understand"	Sewell; Parker Ighile; Victoria Akintola; Dion Wardle	Ighile	3:49
4.	"Crazy Over Here" (featuring Parker)	Sewell; Ighile; Kassa Alexander	Ighile	4:01
5.	"You Don't Own Me" (featuring G-Eazy)	John Madara; Dave White; Gerald Gillum	Quincy Jones; Ighile	3:21
6.	"How to Love Me"	Sewell; Kassa Alexander; Mike Riley	PRGRSHN; Riley	3:31
7.	"Coffee"	Sewell; Fraser T Smith; Kassa Alexander	Smith	3:45
8.	"From You"	Sewell; Hinshaw Jr.; Ighile; Byron Thomas; Nathan Cassells	Ighile; Thomas	3:35
9.	"Feel Your Love"	Sewell; Ighile; Hinshaw Jr.; Al Johnson	Ighile	3:03
10.	"New Orleans"	Sewell; Mario Jefferson; Hinshaw Jr.	R!O	3:39
11.	"Boys Boys Boys"	Sewell; Jefferson; Hinshaw Jr.; Kassa Alexander; Leo Boland; Dorothy Fields; Jimmy McHugh; James Moody	R!O	3:53
12.	"Say"	Sewell; Thomas; Ighile; Skip Scarborough	Thomas; Ighile	3:25
13.	"Boyfriend Jeans (Remix)"	Sewell; Shahid Khan; Sheraz Amin; Wesley Muoria-Chaves; Alex Vickery	Naughty Boy	3:44
14.	"Song Cries and Amens"	Sewell; Ighile	Ighile	1:33
Total length:				48:36

Notes

- "Church on Sunday" samples "Outside Love" by Brethren.
- "Feel Your Love" samples "You're a Different Lady" by Al Johnson.
- "Boys Boys Boys" has an interpolation of "Moody's Mood for Love" by James Moody.
- "Say" samples "Love Ballad" by L.T.D.

== Personnel ==
Adapted from the booklet of FMA.

- Efe Ogbeni: executive producer
- Erwin Gorostiza: RCA creative director
- Maria Paula Marulanda: art direction and design
- Dennis Leupold: photographer
- Liz McClean: stylist
- Jillian Halouska: hair
- Megan Lanoux: make-up
- Rie Yoco: manicurist

== Charts ==
Chart (2016)	Peak position
Australian Albums (ARIA)	32
Canadian Albums (Billboard)	93
New Zealand Heatseekers Albums (RMNZ)	3
UK Albums (OCC)	42
US Billboard 200	34
US Album Sales (Billboard)	32
