= Just Between You and Me (The Chordettes song) =

Single by The Chordettes

from the album The Chordettes
- B-side: "Soft Sands"
- Released: July 1957
- Genre: Pop
- Length: 2:06
- Label: Cadence; 1330
- Songwriter(s): Lee Cathy, Jack Keller

The Chordettes singles chronology
"Echo of Love" (April 1957)	"Just Between You and Me" (1957)	"Baby of Mine" (December 1957)

"Just Between You and Me" is a song written by Lee Cathy and Jack Keller and performed by The Chordettes. In 1957, the track reached No. 8 on the Billboard Hot 100. In Canada it reached No. 15.

The single's B-side, "Soft Sands", reached No. 73 on the Billboard Hot 100 and No. 16 in Canada.

It was featured on their 1957 album, The Chordettes.
