= Sunshine, Lollipops and Rainbows =

1965 single by Lesley Gore

Single by Lesley Gore

from the album Lesley Gore Sings of Mixed-Up Hearts
- B-side: "You've Come Back" (from Girl Talk)
- Released: November 1963 (album); May 1965 (single)
- Recorded: May 1963
- Studio: A&R Recording, New York City
- Genre: Sunshine pop
- Length: 1:37
- Label: Mercury
- Songwriters: Marvin Hamlisch, Howard Liebling
- Producer: Quincy Jones

Lesley Gore singles chronology
"All of My Life" (1965)	"Sunshine, Lollipops and Rainbows" (1963)	"My Town, My Guy and Me" (1965)

"Sunshine, Lollipops and Rainbows" is a popular song sung by Lesley Gore. It was originally released on Gore's 1963 album Lesley Gore Sings of Mixed-Up Hearts. It was composed by Marvin Hamlisch and Howard Liebling, arranged by Claus Ogerman, and produced by Quincy Jones.

== Background ==
The single was released in conjunction with Gore's performance of the song in the 1965 film Ski Party.

Billboard described the single as "back on the happy rhythm trail, Lesley comes up with a winner in this summertime rouser." Cash Box described it as "an engaging lovey-dovey, a perfect way for teeners to get in the summertime spirit."

The 1965 single version was sped up compared to the original album recording.

== Personnel ==
- Lesley Gore – vocals

== Chart performance ==
The song peaked at No. 13 on the Billboard Hot 100.
