= The Mudlarks =

UK musical group

- Origin: Luton, Bedfordshire, England
- Genres: Pop music
- Labels: EMI
- Past members: Jeff Mudd; Fred Mudd; Mary Mudd; David Lane

The Mudlarks were an English pop vocal group of the late 1950s and early 1960s. They had two Top 10 UK hit singles in 1958.

== Career ==
The Mudlarks were a family group from Luton, Bedfordshire, England, originally comprising Fred Mudd (1933–2007), Jeff Mudd (born 1936), and Mary Mudd (born 1938). According to press releases at the time, they all had jobs at the Vauxhall motor plant in Luton, and spent their spare time singing together. In 1958, they attracted the attention of BBC Radio music presenter David Jacobs, who won them an appearance on the Six-Five Special TV show, and a recording contract with EMI's Columbia label.

The Mudlarks' first release, "Mutual Admiration Society", was unsuccessful but their second, a cover of the American novelty song "Lollipop", originally recorded by the duo Ronald and Ruby, and more successfully by The Chordettes, rose to No. 2 in the UK Singles Chart. They followed this with another UK Top 10 hit, a cover of The Monotones' "Book of Love". At the end of 1958, The Mudlarks were voted top British vocal group by readers of the New Musical Express. Jeff Mudd then left the group as he was called to do National Service. He was replaced by David Lane (born David Burgess, 1938 – 2010), a compere and entertainer on the Manchester club circuit. The Mudlarks continued to release records until 1964, but had only one more hit – "The Love Game", a No. 30 hit in 1959.

Fred Mudd married Leila Williams, who was Miss Great Britain in 1957 and from 1958 until 1962 co-hosted the BBC children's programme Blue Peter. He died in Marbella, Spain in 2007, leaving a widow, daughter and three grandsons.

In 1962, Mary Mudd and David Lane married in Newton Abbot. Lane died at his home in Hattersley in 2010; he had cancer for eight years previously.

Jeff Mudd married Hazel Dixon in 1962; he now lives in Cornwall.
