= Judy's Turn to Cry =

Single by Lesley Gore

from the album I'll Cry If I Want To
- B-side: "Just Let Me Cry"
- Released: June 21, 1963
- Recorded: May 14, 1963
- Genre: Pop, rock
- Length: 2:12
- Label: Mercury Records
- Songwriter(s): Beverly Ross, Edna Lewis
- Producer(s): Quincy Jones

Lesley Gore singles chronology
"It's My Party" (1963)	"Judy's Turn to Cry" (1963)	"She's a Fool" (1963)

"Judy's Turn to Cry" is a song written by Beverly Ross and Edna Lewis that was originally released by Lesley Gore in 1963. The song is the sequel to Gore's prior hit "It's My Party", and both songs were produced by Quincy Jones. It was released on Gore's first album I'll Cry If I Want To and also as a single which reached No. 5 on the Billboard Hot 100 chart and No. 10 on the Billboard R&B singles chart. The single earned a gold record.

== Background ==
When "It's My Party" entered the Billboard Hot 100 on May 11, 1963, Gore's label, Mercury Records rushed to record a sequel. The sequel, "Judy's Turn to Cry," was recorded on May 14, 1963. In "It's My Party," the singer was in tears because her boyfriend Johnny left with her best friend Judy. In "Judy's Turn to Cry," the singer kisses another boy at another party in order to make Johnny jealous and Johnny hits the other boy and returns to her. In the chorus, which also opens the song, the triumphant singer gloats that "Well now it's Judy's turn to cry, Judy's turn to cry, Judy's turn to cry; 'cause Johnny's come back to me". Until then the singer's "tears just fell like rain drops" because "Judy's smile was so mean". With its emphasis on crying—in this case Judy rather than the singer—the song fit in with the theme of the album I'll Cry If I Want To, in which most of the songs involved someone crying.

The song's instrumentation includes drums and horns. Allmusic critic Joe Viglione describes "Judy's Turn to Cry" as having "a monstrous hook as valuable as 'It's My Party' with violence that may have been inspired by The Crystals pushing the envelope with their withdrawn classic 'He Hit Me (It Felt Like a Kiss)'". Viglione also notes that because both "It's My Party" and "Judy's Turn to Cry" are short, both at just under 2:20, and each starts off with its own identifiable hook, and the choruses are different but the verses tell one continuous story, the two songs could be played on the radio back to back, allowing Gore to sing the entire "soap opera". This song is in the key of D Major, while "It's my Party" is in the key of A Major. Connie Landers sang the two songs back to back on the 2008 album Girls Girls Girls: 1960's Rock N Roll. Author Maury Dean notes that Gore's "crisp soprano uses very sophisticated jazz progressions". Music journalist Lillian Roxon commented that "you could savor every bitchy second of Lesley's triumph with her sequel 'Judy's Turn to Cry"". Cash Box described the song as "a stompin’ multi-track sequel to [Gore's] initial success" and praised Claus Ogermann's arrangement.

Subsequent to initial release as a single and on I'll Cry If I Want To, "Judy's Turn to Cry" has been released on numerous Lesley Gore compilation albums. These include The Golden Hits of Lesley Gore in 1965, It's My Party: The Mercury Anthology in 1996, Sunshine, Lollipops, and Rainbows: The Best of Lesley Gore in 1998, 20th Century Masters – The Millennium Collection in 2000 and The Ultimate Collection 1963–1968: Start the Party Again in 2005. It has also been included on a number of multi-artist compilations of 1960s songs.

== Charts ==
Chart (1963)	Peak position
US Billboard Hot 100	5
US Hot R&B Sides	10

== "Just Let Me Cry" ==
The b-side of the "Judy's Turn to Cry" single was also taken from the I'll Cry If I Want To album. It was written by Mark Barkan and Ben Raleigh. Cash Box described it as "a 'Song of India' teen re-write handclapper that also stomps along in smash style" and praised Ogermann's arrangement on this song too.
