= Lollipop (1958 song) =

1958 pop song

Single by Ronald & Ruby
- B-side: "Fickle Baby"
- Released: February 1958
- Recorded: 1957
- Genre: Pop, doo-wop
- Length: 2:14
- Label: RCA
- Songwriters: Beverly Ross, Julius Dixson
- Producer: Julius Dixson

Ronald & Ruby singles chronology
"Lollipop" (1958)	"Lohr Byron Birds" (1959)

"Lollipop" is a pop song written by Julius Dixson and Beverly Ross in 1958. It was first recorded by the duo Ronald & Ruby, with Ross performing as "Ruby." It was covered more successfully by the Chordettes whose version reached No. 2 in the US, and the Mudlarks in the UK.

== Origins ==
According to Julius Dixson, the song originated when he was late for a songwriting session with Beverly Ross. He explained that his daughter had gotten a lollipop stuck in her hair, and that had caused him to be late. Ross was so inspired by the word "lollipop" that she sat down at the piano and produced a version of the song on the spot. As in many rock and roll songs, the lyrics contain some hints and innuendos relating to sex. Beverly Ross recorded a demo with Ronald Gumm (or Gumps), a 13-year-old neighbor of Dixson, under the name Ronald & Ruby. Ross's mother insisted that she use a pseudonym for safety reasons, because they were an interracial duo.

RCA got hold of it and Dixson, who owned the master and had produced the demo, agreed to let them release it. Ronald and Ruby's version rose up the chart, reaching No. 20.

== The Chordettes version ==
"Lollipop"

Single by the Chordettes
- B-side: "Baby Come-A Back-A"
- Released: February 1958
- Recorded: 1958
- Genre: Pop, doo-wop
- Length: 2:09
- Label: Cadence
- Songwriters: Beverly Ross, Julius Dixson
- Producer: Archie Bleyer

The Chordettes singles chronology
"Photographs" (1957)	"Lollipop" (1958)	"Zorro" (1958)

"Lollipop" was then covered in the United States by female vocal quartet the Chordettes. Their version featured the sounds of rhythmic hand claps heard at the beginning, and a distinctive popping sound created by one of the Chordettes putting her finger into the mouth and flicking it out. It also featured a male chorus singing the "Boom Booms". The Chordettes' version reached No. 2 and No. 3 on the Billboard pop and R&B charts, respectively. The song became a worldwide hit, reaching No. 6 in the UK, which is their highest charting song in the UK.

=== Charts ===
Chart (1958)	Peak position
Belgium (Ultratop 50 Flanders)	18
Canada (CHUM Hit Parade)	1
Netherlands (Single Top 100)	14
UK Singles (OCC)	6
US Top 100 Sides (Billboard)	2
US R&B Best Sellers in Stores (Billboard)	3

== Other versions ==
- A cover version by the Mudlarks was released in the UK and it reached No. 2 on the UK chart.

== See also ==
- List of 1950s one-hit wonders in the United States
