= It's My Party =

1963 single by Lesley Gore

- Original US single cover

Single by Lesley Gore

from the album I'll Cry If I Want To
- B-side: "Danny"
- Released: April 5, 1963
- Recorded: March 30, 1963
- Studio: Bell Sound (New York City)
- Genre: Pop
- Length: 2:19
- Label: Mercury
- Songwriters: Walter Gold; John Gluck Jr.; Herb Weiner; Seymour Gottlieb
- Producer: Quincy Jones

Lesley Gore singles chronology
"It's My Party" (1963)	"Judy's Turn to Cry" (1963)

Alternative cover
- EP cover

Music video
- "It's My Party & She's A Fool" on The Ed Sullivan Show on YouTube

"It's My Party" is the debut song recorded by American singer Lesley Gore on her debut studio album I'll Cry If I Want To (1963). It was released as her debut single on April 5, 1963, by Mercury Records. The song was written by Herb Wiener, John Gluck Jr. and Wally Gold, and produced by Quincy Jones.

== Theme ==
The song lyrically portrays the discomfort of a teenage girl at her birthday party when her boyfriend Johnny disappears, last seen holding hands with another girl named Judy. Johnny returns with Judy who is seen "wearing his ring", indicating that he has replaced the birthday girl as his love interest.

"It's My Party" is in the key of A major. The song's effectiveness is enhanced by several musical touches that producer Quincy Jones incorporated, including Latin-sounding rhythms, double tracked vocals, and effective horn parts. Allmusic critic Jason Ankeny wrote of the song, "'It's My Party' remains one of the most vivid evocations of adolescent heartbreak ever waxed – Quincy Jones produced the record, although you'd swear it was Aaron Spelling instead."

== Background ==
"It's My Party" was credited to John Gluck, Wally Gold and Herb Weiner, staff writers at the Aaron Schroeder Music firm in 1962. The lyrics were actually written by Seymour Gottlieb, a freelance songwriter. He gave the lyrics to Herb Weiner, with whom he partnered in writing songs, to peddle. It was based on an actual event - Gottlieb's daughter Judy crying over her grandparents being invited to her "sweet sixteen" party. The demo for the song was cut by Barbara Jean English, a girl group veteran (the Clickettes, the Fashions), who was then working as a receptionist at the firm. She also worked with Jimmy Radcliffe, serving as the firm's in-house demo singer. Radcliffe produced the demo, and, according to English, "tried to persuade Musicor [the label owned by Aaron Schroeder] to release it as a record, or to take me into a master studio and redo it, but they weren't interested".

The song was also recorded by Helen Shapiro for her Helen in Nashville album in February 1963, with Shapiro's regular producer, Norrie Paramor, and also Al Kasha. Shapiro later recalled: "Right from the first time we heard the song on the rough demo back in London, we thought we were going to sock them between the eyes with that one"; however, Shapiro's version was not one of the cuts chosen as an advance single from the album and by the time of the album's release that October, the "It's My Party" track was perceived as a cover of Lesley Gore's hit.

Lesley Gore recalls that "It's My Party" was among some two hundred demos producer Quincy Jones brought to review with her in the den of her family home in February 1963. On hearing the song, Gore told Jones: "That's not half bad. I like it. Good melody. Let's put it on the maybe pile." The song proved to be the only demo Gore and Jones found agreeable. With Jones producing and Claus Ogerman handling arranging and conducting duties, Gore recorded "It's My Party" at Bell Sound Studios in Manhattan on March 30, 1963.

In March 1963, Phil Spector heard the demo of "It's My Party" while visiting Aaron Schroeder's office. Wally Gold later recalled: "He [Spector] said, 'Great, I love it. I'm gonna do it with the Crystals.' We [the song's writers] were really excited, because that would ensure that the record was #1!" Schroeder apparently only learned of the Lesley Gore recording of "It's My Party" when Quincy Jones invited him to hear the completed track, which Schroeder found formulaic; believing that Spector would be able to cut a much stronger version of the song with the Crystals and not wanting to lose Spector's good will, Schroeder attempted to convince Jones to suppress the track. Schroeder did not mention Spector's version to Jones, but Jones and Spector both happened to attend a concert with Charles Aznavour at Carnegie Hall on the evening of March 30, 1963, and when they met outside it came up in conversation that Spector had recorded a version of "It's My Party" with the Crystals. (Note: As with "He's a Rebel", the Crystals' hit for which it was intended as the follow-up, "It's My Party" was actually recorded not by the Crystals but the Blossoms, who cut the track at Gold Star Studios. Darlene Love says the Spector version was "kinda slow with me and my sister Edna [Wright] singing together on lead. Much more R&B than Lesley Gore's version.") Jones skipped the concert, instead spending that night – a Saturday – at Bell Sound Studios making a test pressing of the track, comprising one hundred copies.

Over the next two days, Jones mailed these out to radio programmers in key markets across the US. Gore heard her record played on the radio for the first time that Friday; the official release of "It's My Party" came later in the month, with the disc ascending to number one nationally in four weeks. Jones was abroad at the time of "It's My Party"'s release. On his return, he expressed dismay when Aaron Schroeder advised him that the rush release of "It's My Party" had precluded coining a more pleasant name for the singer than "Lesley Gore", to which Schroeder replied: "Didn't anybody tell you?... Quince, the record's number one. Do you really give a damn what her last name is?"

Reviewing the song, Cash Box said that Gore "has a slick, wide-range voice aptly suited to the tune, a medium-paced, chorus-backed romancer with a potent teen-oriented multi-dance beat."

The song received a Grammy nomination for Best Rock & Roll Recording at the Grammy Awards in 1964.

Gore released a sequel to "It's My Party", which was titled "Judy's Turn to Cry".

In 1980, WCBN-FM, the University of Michigan freeform student radio station, played "It's My Party" for 18 hours straight the day after Ronald Reagan was elected.

In 1999, the song was used as an advertising jingle to promote Burger King's 99-cent meal.

In August 2021, a trend of using a remixed version of the song in videos on video-sharing app TikTok led to a resurgence of interest in the song.

== Charts ==
=== Weekly charts ===
Chart (1963–1964)	Peak position
Australia (Kent Music Report)	1
Canada (CHUM Hit Parade)	1
New Zealand (Lever Hit Parade)	1
UK Singles (Official Charts)	9
US Billboard Hot 100	1
US R&B (Billboard)	1
US Cash Box Top 100	1

=== Year-end charts ===
Chart (1963)	Position
US Billboard Hot 100	29
US Cash Box Top 100	30

== Dave Stewart and Barbara Gaskin version ==
"It's My Party"

Single by Dave Stewart with Barbara Gaskin
- B-side: "Waiting in the Wings"
- Released: September 1981
- Length: 3:47
- Label: Stiff
- Songwriters: Wally Gold; John Gluck Jr.; Herb Weiner
- Producer: Dave Stewart

Dave Stewart with Barbara Gaskin singles chronology
"It's My Party" (1981)	"Johnny Rocco" (1982)

Music video
- "It's My Party" (TopPop, 1981) on YouTube

In 1981, a remake by British artists Dave Stewart and Barbara Gaskin was a UK number one hit single for four weeks, becoming the first version of the song to reach number one in the UK. The record also reached number one in Ireland and New Zealand and reached the top 10 in Australia, Austria, Germany, South Africa, and Switzerland. The music video for the Stewart/Gaskin version contained a cameo by Thomas Dolby as Johnny, Judy being played by Gaskin in a blond wig.

=== Charts ===
==== Weekly charts ====
Chart (1981–1982)	Peak position
Australia (Kent Music Report)	4
Austria (Ö3 Austria Top 40)	3
Belgium (Ultratop 50 Flanders)	17
Canada Top Singles (RPM)	13
Ireland (IRMA)	1
Netherlands (Dutch Top 40)	20
Netherlands (Single Top 100)	26
New Zealand (Recorded Music NZ)	1
South Africa (Springbok Radio)	3
Switzerland (Schweizer Hitparade)	6
UK Singles (Official Charts)	1
US Billboard Hot 100	72
West Germany (GfK)	3

==== Year-end charts ====
Chart (1981)	Position
UK Singles (OCC)	12

Chart (1982)	Position
Australia (Kent Music Report)	46
New Zealand (RIANZ)	47
West Germany (Media Control)	29

== Notable versions ==
- In 1973, Bryan Ferry recorded "It's My Party" for his first solo album, "These Foolish Things".
- In 1977, Carroll Baker had a number one country hit in Canada with her version of "It's My Party".
- In 2010, Amy Winehouse recorded "It's My Party" for a Quincy Jones tribute album Q Soul Bossa Nostra. The cover barely entered the top-40 of the Italian Airplay chart, and reached number 11 on the Flanders Ultratip chart, a bubbling-under extension of the Ultratop 50.
- In 2014, Icona Pop featuring Ty Dolla Sign did "My Party" with many borrowed lines from the original song.
- In 2015, Melanie Martinez released "Pity Party". The track uses an interpolation of the chorus from "It's My Party".
- In 2017, Motionless in White released “Necessary Evil”. The track uses an interpolation of the chorus from "It's My Party".
- In 2022, XG recorded "Mascara." The track uses an interpolation of the chorus from "It's My Party" .
- In 2023, Anna Waronker recorded "It's My Party" for season 2 of Apple TV+ animated series Harriet the Spy.
