= The Chordettes =

American female singing quartet

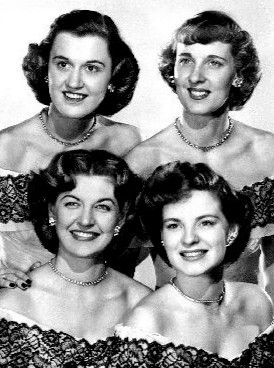
- Clockwise: Carol Buschmann, Dorothy "Dottie" Schwartz, Jinny Osborn, and Janet Ertel Bleyer

Background information
- Origin: Sheboygan, Wisconsin, U.S.
- Genres: Barbershop music; traditional pop; doo wop; pop rock
- Years active: 1946–1963
- Labels: Columbia; Cadence; London
- Past members: Jinny Osborn; Carol Buschmann; Lynn Evans; Janet Ertel (aka Bleyer); Margie Latzko; Dorothy “Dottie” (Hummitzsch) Schwartz; Nancy Overton; Alice Mae Spielvogel (née Buschmann); Joyce Weston

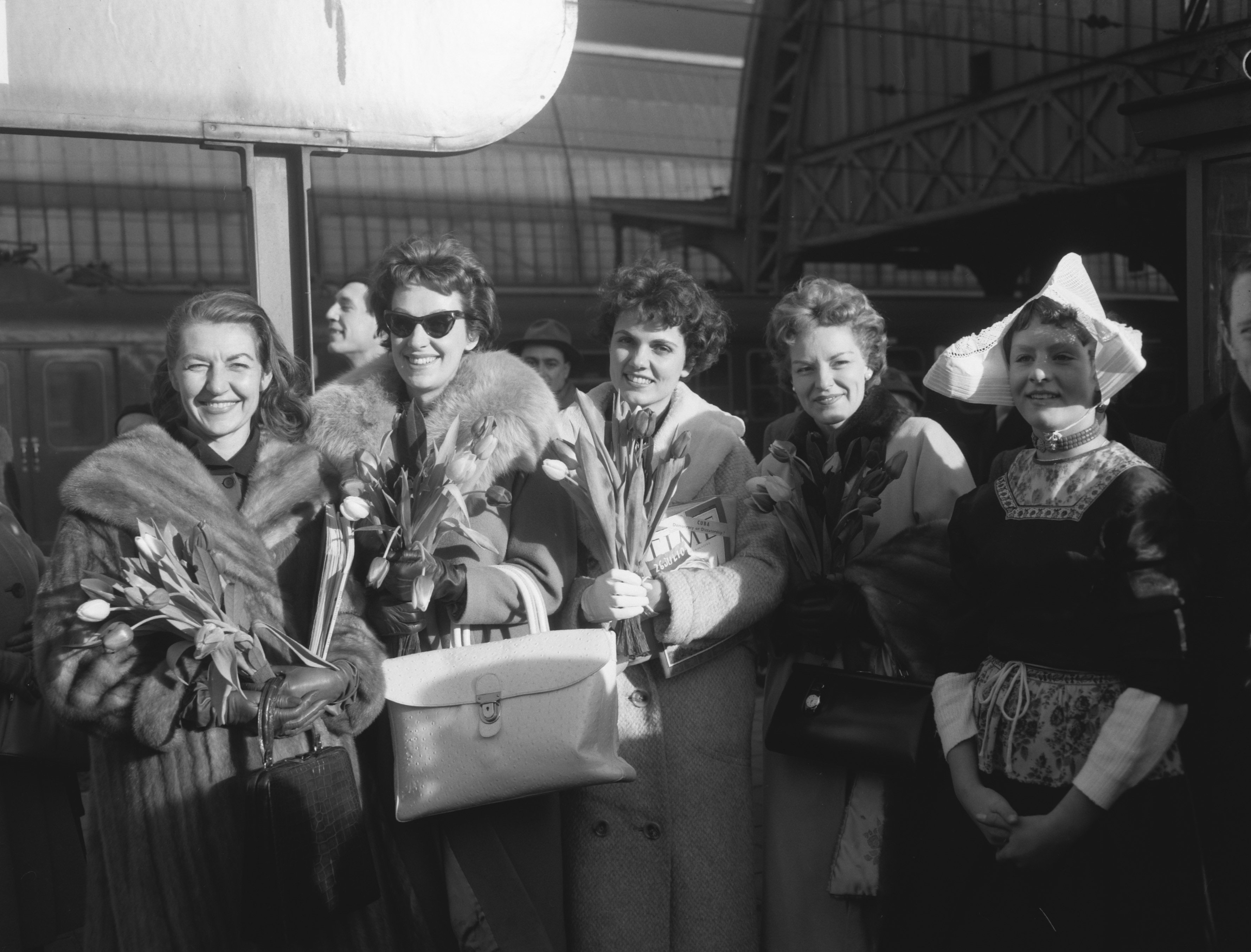
The Chordettes (Amsterdam, 1959)

The Chordettes were an American female vocal quartet, specializing in traditional pop music. They are best known for their 1950s hit singles "Mr. Sandman" and "Lollipop", both of which sold over a million copies.

The group's music has roots in the vocal harmonies of the 1940s and early 1950s, and their stylings have drawn comparisons to the Andrews Sisters.

== Career ==
The group organized in Sheboygan, Wisconsin, in 1946. The original members of the group were Janet Ertel Bleyer (née Buschmann), Alice Mae Buschmann Spielvogel, Dorothy "Dottie" (Hummitzsch) Schwartz and Jinny Osborn (née Virginia Cole). Originally they sang folk music in the style of The Weavers, but eventually changed to a harmonizing style of the type known as barbershop harmony or close harmony.

After performing locally in Sheboygan, they won on Arthur Godfrey's radio program Talent Scouts in 1949. They held feature status on Godfrey's daily program, and in 1950 recorded their first LP, a collection of standards titled Harmony Time for Columbia Records. Three more LPs followed.

In 1953, Godfrey's music director and orchestra leader, Archie Bleyer, founded Cadence Records. He signed a number of Godfrey regulars and former regulars, including the Chordettes, who had a number of hit records for Cadence.

Beginning in January 1954, the group sang on the Robert Q. Lewis Show, a weekday afternoon program on CBS-TV.

The Chordettes had released a couple of singles with Arthur Godfrey on Columbia in 1950–51 but did not cut a solo single until their breakout hit, "Mr. Sandman", released in late 1954 and which went on to become a number one 1955 hit for seven weeks. It sold in excess of a million copies and was awarded gold disc status. Archie Bleyer himself was on that record along with the group; Bleyer stripped down the sound to highlight the women's voices. They also reached number two with 1958's "Lollipop", another million album seller, and a number 2 on the charts, also charted with a vocal version of the themes from Disney's Zorro (U.S. number 17) (1958) and the film Never on Sunday (U.S. number 13) (1961).

Other hits for the group included "Eddie My Love" (U.S. number 14) (a cover of a song by doo-wop group The Teen Queens), "Born to Be With You" (U.S. number 5), "Lay Down Your Arms" in 1956, and "Just Between You and Me" (U.S. number 8) in 1957. Their cover of "The White Rose Of Athens" reached the Australian Top 15 in May, 1962. The US single "In The Deep Blue Sea" was a one-week Music Vendor entry four months later (number 128).

The Chordettes appeared on American Bandstand on August 5, 1957, the first episode of that show to be broadcast nationally on the ABC Television Network. The Chordettes also appeared on American Bandstand on February 22, 1958, and again on April 26, 1958.

In 1961, Jinny Osborn again left the group. Unable to find a satisfactory replacement, the group disbanded in the mid-1960s.

== Awards and recognition ==
The group was inducted into the Vocal Group Hall of Fame in 2001.

== Deaths ==
Alice Mae Buschmann Spielvogel died in 1981 at the age of 55.

Janet Ertel Bleyer died on November 22, 1988, at the age of 75.

Jinny Osborn (later known as Jinny Janis) died in 2003 at the age of 76.

Nancy Overton died on April 5, 2009, at the age of 83 after a long battle with esophageal cancer.

Dorothy "Dottie" (Hummitzsch) Schwartz died on April 4, 2016, at the age of 89.

Lynn Evans Mand died on February 6, 2020, at the age of 95.

Carol Buschmann died in Sheboygan, Wisconsin, on September 30, 2023, at the age of 96.

Marjorie "Margie" Needham Latzko, the last surviving member of the Chordettes, died in Saratoga Springs, New York, on August 22, 2025, at the age of 96.

== Members ==
=== Original ===
- Janet Ertel (1946–1963; was later replaced by Nancy Overton for touring around 1959)
- Alice Mae Buschmann Spielvogel (1946–1947)
- Dorothy "Dottie" (Hummitzsch) Schwartz (1946–1952)
- Jinny Osborn/Lockard (1946–1953, 1957–1961)

=== Additional ===
- Carol Buschmann (1947–1963)
- Lynn Evans (née Hargate) (1953–1963)
- Margie Needham (1953–1957)
- Nancy Overton (1957–1963; replaced Janet Ertel for touring around 1959)

== Discography ==
=== Albums ===
Year	Album	US BB	Record Label
1950	Harmony Time	3	Columbia
1951	Harmony Time Volume II	—	Columbia
1952	Harmony Encores	—	Columbia
1953	The Chordettes Sing Your Requests	—	Columbia
1955	The Chordettes	—	Columbia
1955	Listen	—	Columbia
1955	Close Harmony	—	Cadence
1957	The Chordettes	—	Cadence
1959	Drifting and Dreaming	—	Harmony
1962	Never on Sunday	—	Cadence

=== Singles ===
Year	Single (A-side, B-side) Both sides from same album except where indicated	Chart positions					Album
Year	Single (A-side, B-side) Both sides from same album except where indicated	US	US R&B	US A/C	CAN CHUM	UK	Album
1950	"Down by the Old Mill Stream" (with Arthur Godfrey)	—	—	—	—	—	Non-album tracks
1950	"If It Wasn't for Your Father" (with Arthur Godfrey) b/w "Gone Fishin'" (non-album track)	—	—	—	—	—	Non-album tracks
1950	"Time Out for Tears" (with Bill Lawrence) b/w "Can't Seem to Laugh Anymore" (non-album track)	—	—	—	—	—	Non-album tracks
1950	"Hawaii" (with Arthur Godfrey) b/w "Driftin' Down the Dreamy Ol' Ohio" (non-album track)	—	—	—	—	—	Non-album tracks
1951	"Candy & Cake" (with Arthur Godfrey)	—	—	—	—	—	Non-album tracks
1954	"Mr. Sandman" b/w "I Don't Wanna See You Cryin'" (non-album track)	1	—	—	—	11	The Chordettes
1955	"Lonely Lips" b/w "The Dudelsack Song" (non-album track)	—	—	—	—	—	All the Very Best of the Chordettes
1955	"Humming Bird" b/w "I Told a Lie" (non-album track)	—	—	—	—	—	The Chordettes
1956	"The Wedding" b/w "I Don't Know, I Don't Care" (non-album track)	91	—	—	—	—	All the Very Best of the Chordettes
1956	"Eddie My Love" b/w "Whistlin' Willie" (non-album track)	14	—	—	—	—	The Chordettes
1956	"Born to Be with You" b/w "Love Never Changes"	5	—	—	—	8	The Chordettes
1956	"Lay Down Your Arms" /	16	—	—	—	—	The Chordettes
1956	"Teen Age Goodnight"	45	—	—	—	—	The Chordettes
1957	"Come Home to My Arms" b/w "(Fifi's) Walkin' the Poodle" (non-album track)	—	—	—	—	—	The Chordettes
1957	"Echo of Love" b/w "Like a Baby" (from The Chordettes)	—	—	—	—	—	Non-album track
1957	"Just Between You and Me" /	8	—	—	15	—	The Chordettes
1957	"Soft Sands"	73	—	—	16	—	The Chordettes
1957	"Baby of Mine" b/w "Photographs"	—	—	—	—	—	Non-album tracks
1958	"Lollipop" b/w "Baby, Come-a Back-a" (non-album track)	2	3	—	1	6	All the Very Best of the Chordettes
1958	"Zorro" b/w "Love Is a Two-Way Street" (non-album track)	17	—	—	17	—	All the Very Best of the Chordettes
1959	"No Other Arms, No Other Lips" [Cadence 1361] b/w "We Should Be Together" (non-album track)	27	—	—	—	—	All the Very Best of the Chordettes
1959	"A Girl's Work Is Never Done" [Cadence 1366] b/w "No Wheels" (non-album track)	89	—	—	—	—	All the Very Best of the Chordettes
1960	"A Broken Vow" b/w "All My Sorrows"	102	—	—	—	—	Non-album tracks
1961	"Never on Sunday" /	13	—	4	16	—	Never on Sunday
1961	"Faraway Star"	90	—	—	—	—	All the Very Best of the Chordettes
1961	"The Exodus Song" b/w "Theme from 'Goodbye Again'"	—	—	—	—	—	Never on Sunday
1962	"The White Rose of Athens" b/w "Adios"	—	—	—	—	—	Non-album tracks
1962	"In the Deep Blue Sea" b/w "All My Sorrows"	—	—	—	—	—	Non-album tracks
1963	"True Love Goes On and On" b/w "All My Sorrows"	—	—	—	—	—	Non-album tracks
"—" denotes releases that did not chart or were not released in that territory.

== See also ==
- List of vocal groups
- List of artists who reached number one in the United States
- List of acts who appeared on American Bandstand
