= Lesley Gore =

American singer (1946–2015)

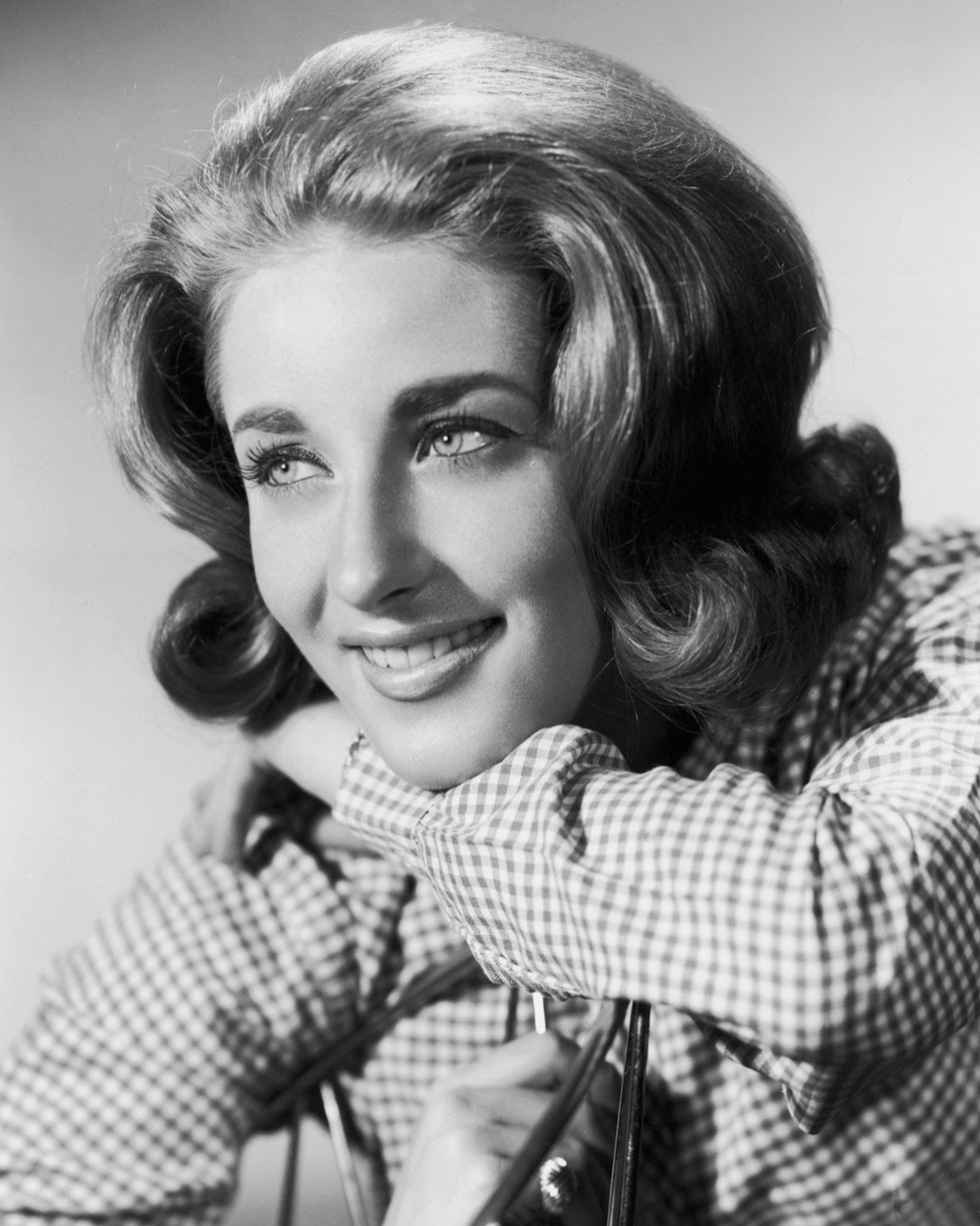
- Gore in 1963
- Born: Lesley Sue Goldstein; May 2, 1946; New York City, U.S.
- Died: February 16, 2015 (aged 68); New York City, U.S.
- Education: Sarah Lawrence College
- Occupations: Singer; songwriter; actress
- Years active: 1963–2015
- Partner: Lois Sasson (1982–2015)
- Relatives: Michael Gore (brother); Alan Dean Foster (cousin); Howie Horwitz (uncle)
- Musical career
- Genre: Pop
- Instrument: Vocals
- Labels: Mercury; MoWest; A&M

Lesley Sue Gore (née Goldstein; May 2, 1946 – February 16, 2015) was an American singer, songwriter, and actress. At the age of 16, she recorded her first hit song, "It's My Party", a U.S. number one in 1963. She followed it up with ten further U.S. Billboard top 40 hits, including "Judy's Turn to Cry" and "You Don't Own Me". Gore said she considered "You Don't Own Me" her signature song.

Gore later worked as an actress and television personality. She composed songs with her brother Michael Gore for the 1980 film Fame, which received an Academy Award Best Song nomination for "Out Here On My Own". She hosted several editions of the LGBT-oriented public television show In the Life on American TV in the 2000s.

== Early life and education ==
Gore was born Lesley Sue Goldstein in Brooklyn, New York City, into a middle-class Jewish family. Her parents were Leo Goldstein and Ronny Gore. The family changed their surname to "Gore" soon after Lesley's birth. Her father was the owner of Peter Pan, a children's swimwear and underwear manufacturer, and later became a leading brand licensing agent in the apparel industry. She was raised in Tenafly, New Jersey, and attended the Dwight School for Girls in nearby Englewood. She also attended Sarah Lawrence College, graduating with a degree in American literature.

== Career ==
=== 1963–1979: Commercial success ===
Gore was discovered after her uncle gave Joe Glaser a tape of her singing that he forwarded to Irving Green, president of Mercury Records. Green gave the tape to Quincy Jones for evaluation and Jones, recognizing her talent, became her producer. She was 16 years old. When she recorded her version of "It's My Party" in 1963, she was a junior in high school. It became a number-one, nationwide hit. Gore's version was certified as a Gold record. It also marked the beginning of a time when fans would show up on her front lawn.

"It's My Party" was followed by many other hits for Gore, including the sequel, "Judy's Turn to Cry" (US number five); "She's a Fool" (US number five); the feminist-themed million-selling "You Don't Own Me", which held at number two for three weeks behind the Beatles' "I Want To Hold Your Hand"; "That's the Way Boys Are" (US No. 12); "Maybe I Know" (US No. 14/UK No. 20); "Look of Love" (US No. 27); and "Sunshine, Lollipops and Rainbows" (US number 13), which she sang during a bus scene from the 1965 movie, Ski Party. In 1965, she also appeared in the beach party film The Girls on the Beach in which she performed three songs: "Leave Me Alone", "It's Gotta Be You", and "I Don't Want to Be a Loser".

Gore was given first shot at recording "A Groovy Kind of Love" by songwriters Carole Bayer and Toni Wine with a melody borrowed from a sonatina by Muzio Clementi, but Shelby Singleton, a producer for Mercury subsidiary Smash Records, refused to let Gore record a song with the word "groovy" in its lyrics. The Mindbenders went on to record it, and it reached number two on the Billboard charts.

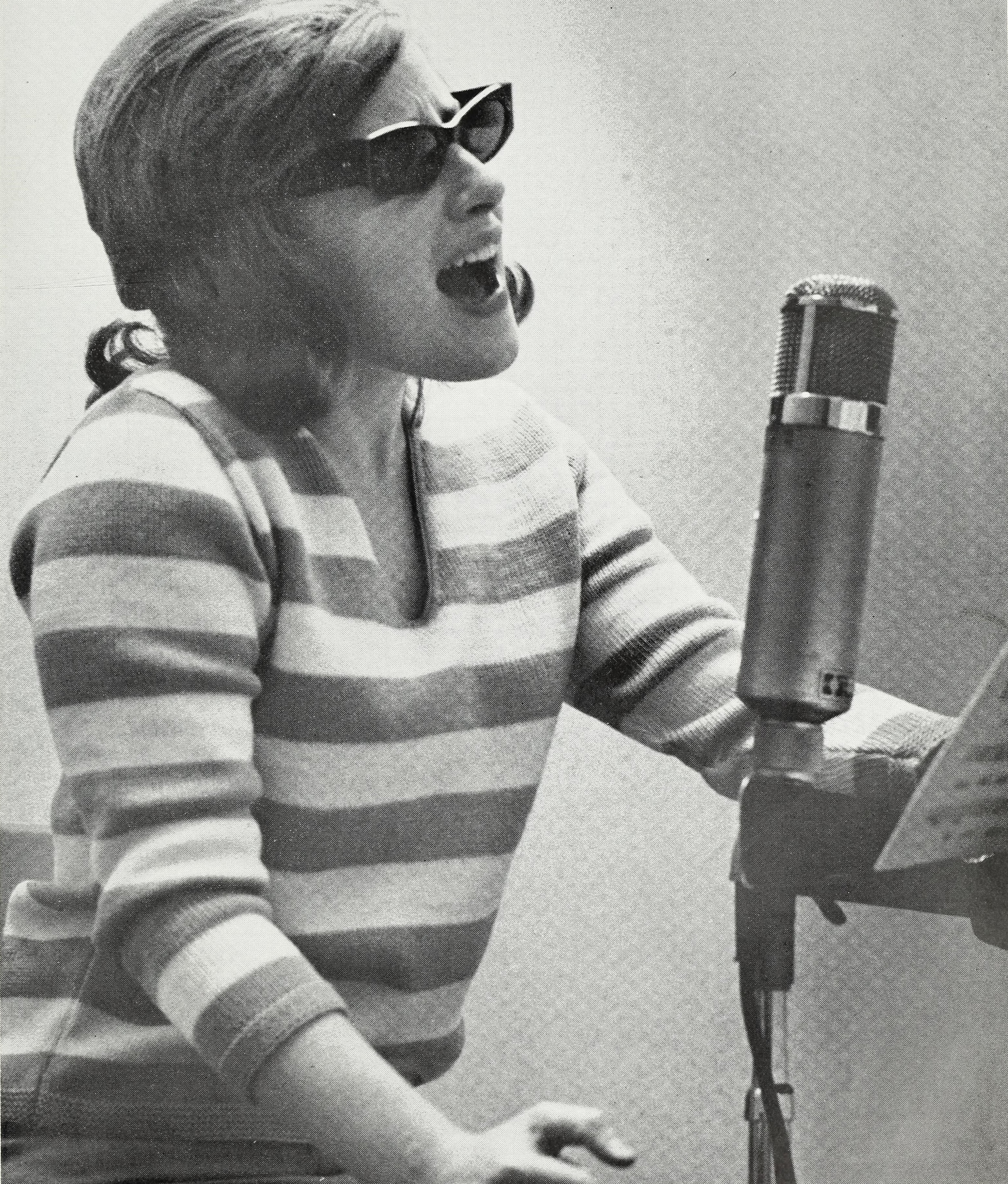
Gore on the cover of Cash Box, 15 June 1963

Gore recorded composer Marvin Hamlisch's first hit composition, "Sunshine, Lollipops and Rainbows", on May 21, 1963, while "It's My Party" was climbing the charts. Her record producer from 1963 to 1965 was Quincy Jones. Jones's dentist was Marvin Hamlisch's uncle, and Hamlisch asked his uncle to convey several songs to Jones. "Sunshine, Lollipops and Rainbows" was released on the LP Lesley Gore Sings of Mixed-Up Hearts, but did not surface as a single until June 1965. Hamlisch composed three other Gore associated songs: "California Nights", "That's the Way the Ball Bounces" and "One by One". "That's the Way the Ball Bounces" was recorded September 21, 1963, at A&R Studios in New York; it was released as the B-side of "That's the Way Boys Are" and appeared on the LP Boys Boys Boys. "One by One" was an unreleased track recorded on July 31, 1969, in New York and produced by Paul Leka; it first appeared on the Bear Family five-CD anthology of Gore's Mercury work entitled It's My Party (1994).

Gore was one of the featured performers in the T.A.M.I. Show concert film, which was recorded and released in 1964 by American International Pictures, and placed in the National Film Registry in 2006. Gore had one of the longest sets in the film, performing six songs, including "It's My Party", "You Don't Own Me", and "Judy's Turn to Cry".

Gore performed on two consecutive episodes of the Batman television series (January 19 and 25, 1967), in which she guest-starred as Pussycat, one of Catwoman's minions. In the January 19 episode "That Darn Catwoman", she lip-synched to the Bob Crewe-produced "California Nights", and in the January 25 episode "Scat! Darn Catwoman", she lip-synched to "Maybe Now". "California Nights", which Gore recorded for her 1967 album of the same name, returned her to the top twenty of the Hot 100. The single peaked at number 16 in March 1967 (14 weeks on the chart). It was her first top-40 hit since "My Town, My Guy and Me" in late 1965 and her first top-20 since "Sunshine, Lollipops, and Rainbows". Gore also performed "It's My Party" and "We Know We're in Love" 10 months earlier on the final episode of The Donna Reed Show, which aired on March 19, 1966.

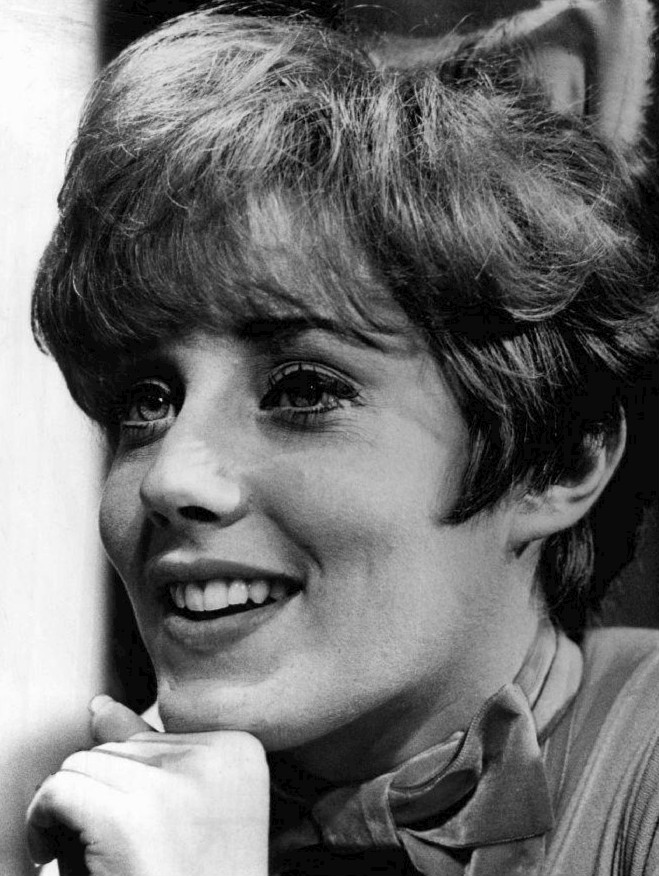
Gore on the television program Batman in 1967

After high school, while continuing to make appearances as a singer, Gore attended Sarah Lawrence College, studying English and American literature. At college, folk music was popularly lauded as "chic", whereas pop music was often derided as "uncool". "Had I been tall with blonde hair, had I been Mary Travers, I would have gotten along fine." She graduated in 1968.

Gore signed a contract with Mercury Records with a five-year term that carried her obligations to the company through the spring of 1968. Her last big hit had been 12 months prior to this time, but Mercury still saw promise in her as an artist and believed that one of her singles would make it, as they had in the past. They offered a one-year extension on the initial contract, and Gore was formally contracted to Mercury for a sixth year. During this time, "He Gives Me Love (La La La)", a single release based on a Eurovision Song Contest winner, rose to number 96 on the Music Business charts, while bubbling under the Hot 100 in Billboard. Mercury took out a full-page ad in the trades to support the single, but its airplay was spotty, becoming a hit in only a few major markets. She was then paired with the successful soul producers Kenny Gamble, Leon Huff, and Thom Bell for two singles that took her into the "soul" genre: "I'll Be Standing By" and "Take Good Care (Of My Heart)". These songs did not fit the image Mercury had crafted for her, and the singles were not played. Her contract with Mercury ended after the release of "98.6/Lazy Day" and "Wedding Bell Blues" failed to make headway on the charts.

In 1970, she signed with Crewe Records and was reunited with producer Bob Crewe, who had produced her album California Nights. Her first release under the label, "Why Doesn't Love Make Me Happy", was a moderate hit on the Adult Contemporary chart, but none of her other singles would prove to be successful. She left Crewe Records in 1971 when the label went bankrupt.

In 1972, Gore signed with MoWest Records, a subsidiary of Motown, and in July of that year released her first studio album in five years, Someplace Else Now. All of the songs were either written or co-written by Gore, with collaborators Ellen Weston and her brother Michael. Due to the failure of the album's sole single, "She Said That", along with poor promotion, Someplace Else Now died on the shelf.

=== 1980–2014: As composer ===
Gore composed songs for the soundtrack of the 1980 film Fame, for which she received an Academy Award nomination for "Out Here on My Own," written with her brother, Michael Gore. Michael won the Academy Award for Best Original Song for the theme song of the same film. Gore played concerts and appeared on television throughout the 1980s and 1990s.

Gore co-wrote a song, "My Secret Love", for the 1996 film Grace of My Heart. The film includes a subplot about a young singer named Kelly Porter, who is based in part on Gore and is played by Bridget Fonda. The character, who is a closeted lesbian, performs "My Secret Love" in the film.

In 2005, Gore recorded Ever Since (her first album of new material since Love Me By Name in 1976), with producer/songwriter Blake Morgan, with the label Engine Company Records. The album received favorable reviews from The New York Times, Rolling Stone, Billboard, and other national press. The album also included a revised version of "You Don't Own Me", about which the New York Daily News wrote: "In Lesley Gore's new version of 'You Don't Own Me'—cut more than 40 years after its initial recording—she lends a pop classic new life." Gore commented: "Without the loud backing track, I could wring more meaning from the lyric". And: "It's a song that takes on new meaning every time you sing it."

== Personal life and death ==
Beginning in 2003, Gore hosted several editions of the PBS television series In the Life, which focused on LGBT issues. In a 2005 interview with AfterEllen, she stated she was a lesbian and had been in a relationship with luxury jewelry designer Lois Sasson since 1982. She had realized she was attracted to women by the time she was 20 and stated that although the music business was "totally homophobic", she never felt she had to pretend she was straight. "I just kind of lived my life naturally and did what I wanted to do", she said. "I didn't avoid anything, I didn't put it in anybody's face."

Gore had been working on a memoir and a Broadway show based on her life when she died of lung cancer on February 16, 2015, at the NYU Langone Medical Center in Manhattan, New York City, at the age of 68. At the time of her death, Gore and Sasson had been together for 33 years.

Her New York Times obituary stated "with songs like 'It's My Party,' 'Judy's Turn to Cry', and the indelibly defiant 1964 single 'You Don't Own Me' — all recorded before she was 18 — Gore made herself the voice of teenaged girls aggrieved by fickle boyfriends, moving quickly from tearful self-pity to fierce self-assertion".

== Awards and recognition ==
In 1964, "It's My Party" was nominated for a Grammy Award for rock-and-roll recording and, in 1981, she was nominated for an Academy Award for Best Original Song for co-writing "Out Here on My Own" for the film Fame.

National Public Radio named Lesley Gore Sings of Mixed-Up Hearts, Gore's second album, as forebearer of one of the top 150 albums recorded by women. The album missed the official list (1964–present) because it was released in 1963. "She is a forebearer for her assertion of feminine power in pop, and her validation of a female perspective."

Gore's papers were donated to the New York Public Library for the Performing Arts and became accessible to the public in 2022. Catalogued by the library and her partner Lois Sasson, it includes family photos, scrapbook pages, annotated music and lyrics, business files, an unfinished memoir, and sound and video recordings.

== Discography ==
- I'll Cry If I Want To (1963)
- Lesley Gore Sings of Mixed-Up Hearts (1963)
- Boys, Boys, Boys (1964)
- Girl Talk (1964)
- My Town, My Guy & Me (1965)
- Lesley Gore Sings All About Love (1966)
- Off and Running (1967, canceled)
- California Nights (1967)
- Magic Colors (1967, canceled)
- Someplace Else Now (1972)
- Love Me By Name (1976)
- The Canvas Can Do Miracles (1982)
- Ever Since (2005)
- Magic Colors: The Lost Album (2011)

== Filmography ==
=== Film ===
Year	Film	Role	Notes
1964	The T.A.M.I Show	Herself	Concert film
1965	The Girls on the Beach	Herself	Sings "Leave Me Alone", "It's Gotta Be You" and "I Don't Wanna Be A Loser"
1965	Ski Party	Herself	Sings "Sunshine, Lollipops and Rainbows"
1968	The Pied Piper of Astroworld	Bo Peep	Television film
1977	Dick Clark's Good Old Days	Herself	Television film
1985	Good Time Rock 'n' Roll	Herself	Television documentary
1986	Deja View	Herself	Direct-to-video
1988	Legendary Ladies of Rock & Roll	Herself	Television special
1990	Listen Up: The Lives of Quincy Jones	Herself	Documentary
1991	Golden Age of Rock 'n' Roll	Herself	Television documentary
1992	In the Life	Herself	Television documentary
1998	Quincy Jones... The First 50 Years	Herself	Television documentary
2000	Hollywood Rocks the Movies: The Early Years (1955–1970)	Herself	Television documentary
2003	Rock at Fifty	Herself	Television documentary
2008	An Evening with Quincy Jones	Herself	Television documentary
2008	Airplay: The Rise and Fall of Rock Radio	Herself	Documentary

=== Television ===
Year	Name	Role	Notes
1963	Club 1270	Herself	A teen-oriented dance-party television show on WXYZ-TV in Detroit ("1270" was a reference to the frequency of WXYZ-AM radio, a leading Top 40 station in the Detroit area at the time, now WXYT).
1963	The Keefe Brasselle Show	Herself	
1963	American Bandstand	Herself	Season 6, episode 194, AB-1528: Lesley Gore – aired 5/30/63.
1963–64	Thank Your Lucky Stars	Herself	Recurring guest; 2 episodes
1963–70	The Ed Sullivan Show	Herself	Recurring guest; 4 episodes: season 16, episode 3 – Other guests: Tony Bennett, Frank Gorshin, Bob & Ray – aired 10/13/63; season 17, episode 18 – Other guests: Burt Lancaster, Mickey Rooney, Miriam Makeba, Shelley Berman – aired 1/31/65; season 21, episode 32 – Other guests: Smokey Robinson & The Miracles, Gwen Verdon; season 22, episode 30 – Other guests: Richie Havens, Moms Mabley, Stiller & Meara – aired 4/26/70.
1963–75	New American Bandstand 1965	Herself	Recurring guest; 3 episodes: season 10, episode 31 – Other guest: The Music Machine – aired 4/8/67; season 10, episode 4 – Other guest: ? (Question Mark) and the Mysterians – aired 10/1/66; season 19, episode 4 – aired 9/27/75.
1964	The Beat Room	Herself	
1964	The Lloyd Thaxton Show	Herself	Season 4, episode 10 – aired September 28, 1964
1965	Fanfare	Herself	Season 1, episode 7 – other guests: Tom Jones, Herb Alpert and the Tijuana Brass – aired July 31, 1965
1965	Shindig!	Herself	Recurring guest; 2 episodes: season 1, episode 30 – Show 30 – April 7, 1965 – other guests: Tina Turner, Marvin Gaye, Larry Hovis, Martha and the Vandellas, Righteous Brothers Season 2, episode 5 – Show 56 – September 30, 1965 – other guests: Mickey Rooney (guest host), Major Lance, The Turtles
1965	Hollywood A Go-Go	Herself	
1965	Shivaree	Herself	Season 2, episode 16 – Show 48 aired 12/25/65.
1965–66	Hullabaloo	Herself	Recurring guest; 3 episodes: season 1, episode 8 – Show 8 – Host: Trini Lopez – aired 3/2/65; season 2, episode 7 – Show 25 – Host: Peter Noone (of Herman's Hermits) – aired 11/1/65; season 2, episode 16 – Show 34 – Host: Roger Smith – aired 1/3/66; season 2, episode 30 – Show 48 – Host: Paul Anka – aired 4/11/66.
1965–70	The Merv Griffin Show	Herself	Recurring guest: 8 episodes: season 2, episode 76 – aired 8/23/65; season 5, episode 104 – aired 1/25/68; Season 5, episode 157 – aired 4/9/68; season 6, episode 96 – aired 1/13/69; season 6, episode 154 – aired 4/3/69; season 7, episode 162 – aired 4/2/70; season 7, episode 239 – aired 7/16/70; season 7, episode 243 – aired 7/22/70. Aired April 2, 1970
1965–71	The Mike Douglas Show	Herself	Recurring guest; 13 episodes: The Mike Douglas Show Herself Season 4: episode 237 – aired 8/4/65, season 5: episode 47 – aired 11/9/65, season 5, episode 216 – aired 7/11/66, season 6: episode 16 – aired 9/26/66, season 6: episode 92 – aired 1/10/67, season 6: episode 176 – aired 5/8/67, season 7: episode 106 – aired 1/29/68, season 7: episode 201 – aired 6/10/68, season 8: episode 42 – aired 11/5/68, season 8: episode 150 – aired 4/4/69, season 9: episode 25 – – aired 10/3/69, season 9: episode 51 – aired 11/10/69, season 9: episode 136 – aired 3/9/70, season 10: episode 118 – aired 2/17/71
1966	The Andy Williams Show	Herself	Season 5, episode 10 – aired November 13, 1966.
1966	The Donna Reed Show	Herself	Season 8, episode 27: "By-Line—Jeff Stone" – aired 3/19/66
1966	Where the Action Is	Herself	Season 6, episode 237 – aired 9/10/66, other guests: the Four Tops
1967	The Match Game	Herself	Season 6, episode 6 – Lesley Gore & Soupy Sales – aired 10/9/67
1967	Batman	Pussycat	Recurring role; 2 episodes: season 2 episodes 40 – That Darn Catwoman – aired 1/19/67; season 2, episode 41 – Scat! Darn Catwoman – aired 1/25/67.
1967	Dream Girl of '67	Herself	Recurring role; 5 episodes
1967	Malibu U	Herself	Season 1, episode 4 – aired 8/11/67 – Other guests include The Turtles and Lou Rawls
1967	Binnen en Buiten	Herself	
1967–68	The Joey Bishop Show	Herself	Recurring guest; 3 episodes: season 1, episode 78 – aired 8/2/67; season 2, episode 122 – aired 3/8/68; season 2, episode 128 – aired 3/18/68.
1968	Happening '68	Herself	Rock music series on the ABC network. It aired Saturday afternoons following American Bandstand. Happening aired Mon through Fri from 7/15/68-10/25/68.
1968	What's My Line?	Herself	Mystery guest; season 1, episode 131 – aired 1/31/1968
1969–70	Della	Herself	Recurring guest; 2 episodes: season 1, episode 14 – aired 6/26/69; season 1, episode 154 – aired 1/13/70.
1970	Playboy After Dark	Herself	Recurring guest; 2 episodes – season 2, episode 11 – Other guests: Don Adams, Fleetwood Mac, Arte Johnson – aired 1/8/70.
1970	The Tonight Show Starring Johnny Carson	Herself	Season 8, episode 41 700701 – aired 7/1/70.
1970	The David Frost Show	Herself	Recurring guest; 2 episodes – season 2, episode 104 – aired January 22, 1970; season 3, episode 59 – aired December 17, 1970.
1970	The Dick Cavett Show	Herself	Season 5, episode 55 – aired January 22, 1970.
1970–71	The Rolf Harris Show	Herself	Recurring guest; 2 episodes
1971	The Virginia Graham Show	Herself	
1975	American Bandstand	Herself	Sept. 27, 1975: Performing 2 songs, "Immortality" and "Give It To Me, Sweet Thing" from her latest record "Love Me By Name"
1975–76	The Midnight Special	Herself	Guest host – season 5, episode 2 – aired 9/24/76. Guest on 2 episodes: season 3, episode 34 – Host: Chubby Checker; season 4, episode 21 – Host: David Brenner, Other guest: Fleetwood Mac
1976	Dinah!	Herself	Season 2, episode 167 – aired May 24, 1976
1977	Sha Na Na	Herself	
1977	$20,000 Pyramid	Herself	$20,000 Pyramid – season 6, episode 6 – Soupy Sales & 5 female stars – aired 10/10/77
1977	Dick Clark's Good Old Days	Herself	Television special
1982–83	All My Children	June Gordan	A music publicist for 6 episodes; performed the song "Easy to Say, Hard to Do" which was written for the show
1985	Our Time	Herself	
1998	Murphy Brown	Herself	Episode: season 10 episode 16: "Opus One" Frank recreates American Bandstand for Murphy's 50th birthday; guests Dick Clark; Fabian; Lesley Gore; Chubby Checker; Sally Field.
1998	A Capitol Fourth	Herself	Lesley performed in concert for the annual "A Capitol Fourth" July 4 celebration in Washington. The show was nationally televised by PBS on the evening of July 4, 1998. (Frank Dixon original source on this).
2001	Walk on By: The Story of Popular Song	Herself	Episode: "Producer Pop"
2001	Biography	Herself	Episode: "Lesley Gore: 'It's Her Party'"
2002	Hollywood Squares	Herself	Recurring guest; 2 episodes
2005	Party Planner with David Tutera	Herself	Episode: "Broadway Legend's Soiree"
2006	In the Life	Herself	Season 1, episode 116 on Logo Borders – aired 1/1/06
2007	TV Land Confidential	Herself	Episode: "Music"
2024	My Music: New Rock, Pop & Doo Wop	Herself	PBS fund-raising special in the My Music series; singing You Don’t Own Me; Volume Two: Doo Wop 51 and Rock At 50.

=== Bibliography ===
- Tollivier, Trevor (2015). You Don't Own me: Life & the times of Lesley Gore. Hal Leonard Corporation. ISBN 9781-4950-2441-2.
