= Ever Since (Lesley Gore album) =

Studio album by Lesley Gore
- Released: June 28, 2005
- Recorded: 2005
- Genre: Pop
- Length: 37:56
- Label: Engine Company
- Producer: Blake Morgan

Lesley Gore chronology
| The Canvas Can Do Miracles (1982) | Ever Since (2005) |

Professional ratings
Review scores
| Source | Rating |
|---|---|
| Allmusic | 3.5/5 stars |

Ever Since is the eleventh and final studio album released by American singer Lesley Gore, released on June 28, 2005 by Engine Company Records. Produced by Blake Morgan, it was preceded by the 1982 album The Canvas Can Do Miracles, and was her first album of original material since 1975's Love Me by Name.

== Reception ==
In addition to extensive national radio coverage and critical acclaim from The New York Times, Rolling Stone, Billboard Magazine, and other national press, three songs from Ever Since have been used in television shows and a film: "Better Angels" in CSI: Miami's fourth season premiere episode, "Words We Don't Say" in an episode of The L Word, and "It's Gone" in the Jeff Lipsky-directed film Flannel Pajamas.

== Track listing ==
| No. | Title | Writer(s) | Length |
|---|---|---|---|
| 1. | "Ever Since" | Mike Errico | 3:20 |
| 2. | "Cool Web" | John Fischer | 3:25 |
| 3. | "It's Gone" | Blake Morgan | 5:05 |
| 4. | "Someday" | Mike Errico | 3:57 |
| 5. | "Better Angels" | Blake Morgan | 4:21 |
| 6. | "You Don't Own Me" | Dave White, John Madara | 4:16 |
| 7. | "Not the First" | Lesley Gore | 3:09 |
| 8. | "Words We Don't Say" | Mike Errico, Lorranie Ferra, Lesley Gore, Tanya Leah, Blake Morgan | 3:35 |
| 9. | "Out Here on My Own" | Lesley Gore, Michael Gore | 4:29 |
| 10. | "We Went So High" | Lesley Gore, Ellen Weston | 2:22 |
