= Haunted (Janita album) =

Studio album by Janita
- Released: July 27, 2010
- Genre: Soul; alternative rock
- Label: ECR Music Group

Janita chronology
Seasons of Life (2006)	Haunted (2010)

Haunted is a solo LP released by Brooklyn-based Finnish singer-songwriter Janita. It was released on Blake Morgan's independent record label Engine Company Records (now ECR Music Group) in 2010.

== Production ==
For the album, Janita no longer worked with Tomi Sachary, instead working with Jamie Siegel, whose credits include the Smashing Pumpkins and Joss Stone. The album was first mastered and edited at Masterdisk in New York for the Finnish release, then later remastered and resequenced by Blake Morgan.

According to Janita, interacting with Meshell Ndegeocello partially convinced her to try a new alternative direction with the album. "She exposed me to music I hadn't explored before. I loved it. Totally devoured it. I moved into Keane, Tom Waits, Radiohead, Smashing Pumpkins, Hole, and PJ Harvey. A natural progression."

== Reception ==
According to SonicScoop, "If the sonic purity and emotional intensity of Haunted sounds like it’s coming from somewhere very real, it’s because it is. Hearts broke in the making, as Janita split with her longtime collaborator/life partner Tomi Sachary even as he served as co-producer on the album. Along the way, Janita connected with co-producer Jamie Siegel and ultimately crafted a collection of songs that leaves her adult contemporary reputation – foisted on her by years of chart-chasing advice – in the dust."

== Track listing ==
1. "Do We Learn"
2. "Last Chance to Run and Hide"
3. "Martian"
4. "Hopelessly Hopeful"
5. "Travels Of Your Mind"
6. "House On Fragile Terrain"
7. "Haunted"
8. "Apologize"
9. "Believe Me I Know"
10. "Out To Get You"
11. "Heal"
