= Unhand Me, You Fiend! =

Studio album by David Cloyd
- Released: January 20, 2009
- Genre: Indie rock
- Label: ECR Music Group
- Producers: David Cloyd, Blake Morgan

David Cloyd chronology
Unhand Me, You Fiend! (2009)	I Could Disappear (2010)

Unhand Me, You Fiend! is the debut album of singer-songwriter David Cloyd. It was released on January 20, 2009, on Engine Company Records (ECR Music Group).

== Production ==
Cloyd composed, performed, and engineered all tracks on the LP, and co-produced the album with Blake Morgan. Morgan mixed and edited, and Phil "Butcher Bros." Nicolo mastered the album at Studio 4 in Philadelphia. The album cover features a photo taken by Cloyd, and the album contains audio liner notes as bonus tracks. Cloyd also included a cover of Radiohead's "Weird Fishes / Arpeggi" from In Rainbows as a bonus track.

== Reception ==
Following its release worldwide, the album peaked at #1 on eMusic's Album Charts. According to another review, the album "took the indie rock scene by storm." His vocals on the album were compared to David Berkeley and Jeff Buckley. According to one review, Cloyd "uses this album to convey the struggles of everyday life."

According to eMusic, "Having recently departed New York City for Buffalo, you can almost hear the isolation in David Cloyd's debut. Unhand Me, You Fiend! jumps between folky, Jeff Buckley-esque ballads, minor-key raucous indie-guitar workouts and, errr, a Radiohead cover (that's actually quite great!). It seems the work of a single, quirky mind with a lot of time on its hands — and it's a joy to listen to."

Melodic.net gave it 4/4 stars and wrote "New talent David Cloyd...offers a stylish and at times complex pop journey. With floating melodies built with acoustic elements and technical details, I have now another album when I listen to contemporary pop at its very best. If you like cool pop in a slightly odd and very personal style, this is a must album."

== Track listing ==
1. "Sold Out Bargain"
2. "Never Run"
3. "Come Out Wherever You Are"
4. "She Asks Me"
5. "We're Coming For You Anyway"
6. "Give Your Enemies A Chance To Rest"
7. "The Wire"
8. "The First Sign"
9. "Unhand Me, You Fiend!"
10. "Weird Fishes / Arpeggi" (Cover, Digital Bonus Track)
11. Audio Liner Notes and Commentary (Digital Bonus Track)
