= Lullabies & Wildflowers =

Studio album by Melissa Errico
- Released: April 29, 2008
- Genre: Easy Listening
- Length: 45:45
- Label: Velour/Universal Records, later Ghostlight Records
- Producer: Rob Mathes

Melissa Errico chronology
Blue Like That (2003)	Lullabies & Wildflowers (2008)	Legrand Affair (2011)

Lullabies & Wildflowers is the second solo recording from singer and actress, Melissa Errico, and is a thematic collection of songs about mothers and their children. The album was released on Velour/Universal Records on 29 April 2008, (then Ghostlight Records). It was produced by Rob Mathes. The CD cover and accompanying booklet was created and illustrated by Kate Neckel.

== Track listing ==
No.	Title	Writer(s)	Length
1	"Mockingbird"	Traditional	2:56
2	"Hushabye"	Traditional	3:04
3	"Since You Asked"	Judy Collins	3:14
4	"The Wind Says Shhh"	Mike Errico	3:42
5	"Gentle Child"	Melissa Errico, Chucho Valdez	3:30
6	"Someone to Watch Over Me"	George Gershwin, Ira Gershwin	4:18
7	"Gartan Mother's Lullaby"	Traditional	3:27
8	"Rockabye Baby"	Traditional	3:33
9	"Wildflowers"	Tom Petty	3:12
10	"A Child Is Born"	Thad Jones	3:25
11	"Tiny Sparrow"	Traditional	4:00
12	"Goodnight"	John Lennon, Paul McCartney	4:00
13	"Walking Happy"	James Van Heusen, Sammy Cahn	3:06

On 18 May 2015, Melissa Errico released a two track download only single, entitled "More Lullabies & Wildflowers" to raise money for the charity "The Bowery Babes". The songs are taken from the same recording sessions as the original album tracks:

No.	Title	Writer(s)	Length
1	"How Are Things In Glocca Morra?"	Burton Lane, E. Y. Harburg	3:08
2	"Maybe Someone Dreamed Us"	Michel Legrand, Alan & Marilyn Bergman	4:35
