= I Could Disappear =

Studio album by David Cloyd
- Released: June 29, 2010
- Genre: Indie rock
- Label: ECR Music Group
- Producer: David Cloyd, Blake Morgan

David Cloyd chronology
Unhand Me, You Fiend! (2009)	I Could Disappear (2010)

I Could Disappear is the second solo album by singer-songwriter David Cloyd. It was released on June 29, 2010 on Engine Company Records (now ECR Music Group). The nine studio tracks are all solo reworkings of the original pop and rock songs from his debut album, Unhand Me, You Fiend!. Cloyd performed vocals, alternating with piano and electric guitar. He also co-engineered and co-produced the album and did the cover. Blake Morgan co-produced and co-engineered with Cloyd, and also mixed and mastered.

According to Cloyd, "With each song boiled down to its essence I discovered something exciting—working with less demands more from you as an artist."

== Track listing ==
1. "Unhand Me, You Fiend!" (Solo)
2. "The Wire" (Solo)
3. "The First Sign" (Solo)
4. "We're Coming For You Anyway" (Solo)
5. "Never Run" (Solo)
6. "Come Out Wherever You Are" (Solo)
7. "Give Your Enemies A Chance To Rest" (Solo)
8. "Sold Out Bargain" (Solo)
9. "She Asks Me" (Solo)
