= Melissa Errico =

American actress (born 1970)

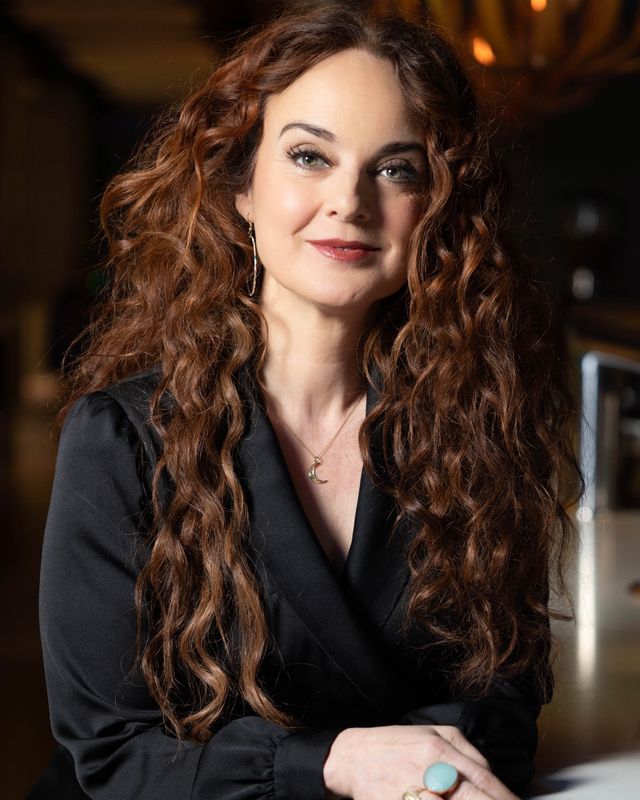
- Melissa Errico (photo by Michael Hull)
- Born: March 23, 1970 (age 56); Manhattan, New York City
- Education: Yale University (BA)
- Occupations: Actress; Singer; Recording artist Writer
- Years active: 1982–present
- Spouse: Patrick McEnroe (m. 1998)
- Children: 3
- Website: melissaerrico.com

Melissa Errico (born March 23, 1970) is an American Tony Award-nominated actress, singer, recording artist, and a contributing writer to The New York Times. She received a Tony Award nomination for Best Actress in a Musical for originating the role of Isabelle in Michel Legrand's Amour (2002). Her other Broadway starring roles include Eliza Doolittle in My Fair Lady, Tracy Lord in High Society, and Mina in Dracula.

Her recording and concert work centers on Stephen Sondheim, Michel Legrand, and the Great American Songbook. Her albums include Legrand Affair (2011), Sondheim Sublime (2018), Sondheim in the City (2024), and I Can Dream, Can’t I? (2026).

Errico performs internationally and has developed concert and film programs exploring the connections among music, literature, and cultural history, including collaborations with writer Adam Gopnik and the French Institute Alliance Française. Since 2016, she has contributed essays to The New York Times about theater, music, and life as a performer.

== Early life ==
Born in New York City, Errico went to high school in Manhasset, New York, while taking dance lessons in Manhattan. Her father is an orthopedic surgeon and concert pianist. Her mother is a former teacher who now works as a sculptor. She began her professional career at 12, appearing on the syndicated children's TV series The Great Space Coaster. Errico's maternal grandmother was an opera singer. Her great-aunt Rose was a performer with the Ziegfeld Follies.

== Education ==
Errico is a graduate of Yale University. During her freshman year, Errico was asked to audition for the role of Cosette while trying out for a different show, and was cast. Errico took a leave of absence from Yale and performed in a tour of Les Misérables, then returned to complete a degree in art history and philosophy. Errico is also a graduate of the British American Drama Academy's 1991 Midsummer in Oxford Programme.

Errico is a guest instructor at HB Studio.

== Theater ==
Errico's Broadway starring roles have included Eliza Doolittle in My Fair Lady, Kitty in Anna Karenina, Tracy Lord in High Society, Isabelle in Amour, Mina in Dracula, the Musical, and Betty Haynes in Irving Berlin's White Christmas. She originated the roles in Anna Karenina, High Society, Amour, and Dracula. Her performance in Amour earned her a Tony Award nomination for Best Performance by a Leading Actress in a Musical.

Errico began her professional musical theater career in 1988, at age 18, playing Cosette in a national touring production of Les Misérables. She made her Broadway debut as Kitty in Anna Karenina in 1992.

She starred as Eliza Doolittle in the 1993–94 revival of My Fair Lady opposite Richard Chamberlain and Julian Holloway at the Virginia Theater. At New York City's Encores! series, she appeared opposite Tyne Daly in Call Me Madam in 1995 and played the title role in One Touch of Venus in 1996. Her performance in One Touch of Venus earned her a Lucille Lortel Award for Outstanding Lead Actress.

In 1998, Errico originated the role of Tracy Lord in the Broadway musical High Society, featuring music and lyrics by Cole Porter and a book by Arthur Kopit, alongside Stephen Bogardus and Randy Graff.

In 2002, Errico played Dot/Marie opposite Raúl Esparza in the Kennedy Center’s production of Stephen Sondheim and James Lapine's Sunday in the Park with George. Her performance received a Helen Hayes Award nomination for Leading Actress in a Musical. Later that year, she originated Isabelle in Michel Legrand’s Broadway musical Amour, earning a 2003 Tony Award nomination for Best Performance by a Leading Actress in a Musical.

In 2003, she appeared in The New Group's revival of Wallace Shawn's Aunt Dan and Lemon, directed by Scott Ellis. She also reprised Eliza Doolittle in My Fair Lady at the Hollywood Bowl, alongside John Lithgow and Roger Daltrey. Her subsequent Hollywood Bowl appearances included Guenevere in Camelot, opposite Jeremy Irons, and Maria in The Sound of Music, with Marni Nixon as the Mother Abbess.

Errico originated Mina in the 2004 Broadway production of Frank Wildhorn's Dracula, the Musical. She returned to Broadway as Betty Haynes in the 2009–10 engagement of Irving Berlin’s White Christmas.

Her longstanding association with Irish Repertory Theatre has included performances in Finian's Rainbow, The Importance of Being Earnest, Candida, and On a Clear Day You Can See Forever. Her performances in The Importance of Being Earnest and Candida received Drama Desk Award nominations.

In 2011, Errico appeared opposite Alec Baldwin in the American premiere of Peter Shaffer’s The Gift of the Gorgon at Guild Hall in East Hampton.

In 2011, she reprised Guenevere opposite Jeremy Irons as King Arthur in Irish Repertory Theatre’s benefit concert production of Camelot at the Shubert Theatre.

In 2012 she played Nancy alongside Brian Stokes Mitchell and James Barbour in Irish Repertory Theatre's benefit concert production of Oliver! at the Shubert Theatre.

In 2013 she played Clara in Classic Stage Company's revival of Stephen Sondheim and James Lapine's Passion, receiving a Drama Desk Award nomination for Outstanding Featured Actress in a Musical.

Errico portrayed Maria Cosway in Salon/Sanctuary Concerts’ More Between Heaven and Earth, a play with music drawn from the correspondence between Cosway and Thomas Jefferson, with script and direction by Erica Gould. She appeared with Matthew Modine and Kathleen Chalfant in 2011 and reprised the role opposite Campbell Scott in 2013 and Jonathan Cake in 2015, the latter two productions staged at Fraunces Tavern in New York.

In 2016, Errico starred as Leona in the Encores! production of Richard Rodgers and Stephen Sondheim's Do I Hear a Waltz? and returned to Irish Repertory Theatre as Sharon in Finian's Rainbow. In 2018, she starred as Daisy Gamble in the company’s revival of On a Clear Day You Can See Forever. She wrote about her experiences in both Irish Rep productions in The New York Times.

In 2023, she starred as Mrs. Patrick Campbell opposite David Staller as George Bernard Shaw in Irish Repertory Theatre’s production of Jerome Kilty’s Dear Liar, directed by Charlotte Moore. The play draws on the correspondence between Shaw and Campbell, the actress who originated Eliza Doolittle in Shaw’s Pygmalion.

In August 2025, Errico portrayed Zelda Fitzgerald opposite Alec Baldwin as F. Scott Fitzgerald in The Fitzgeralds: A Reading with Music at Guild Hall. Directed by Stephen Hamilton, with an original score by Forrest Gray, the performance drew on the Fitzgeralds’ correspondence and marked the centennial of The Great Gatsby. It reunited Errico and Baldwin at the theater where they had previously performed The Gift of the Gorgon.

== Jazz career ==
Errico's career in jazz encompasses concert performances going back to 1997, when she was the youngest person ever to sing at The Cafe Carlyle. She returned to the Café Carlyle in 2002 in a program titled "New Standards," accompanied by Lee Musiker. In 2003, after Bruce Lundvall signed her to Blue Note Records, the label released her recording debut, Blue Like That, produced by Arif Mardin with Alan Pasqua as musical director and pianist.

Errico subsequently developed a body of recording work combining the Great American Songbook, musical theater and jazz. Her recordings have included interpretations of Michel Legrand, an album drawing on songs associated with film noir, and jazz-inflected treatments of Stephen Sondheim. Her Legrand recording was produced by Phil Ramone and featured drummer Steve Gadd. Her 2024 Concord album Sondheim in the City featured Lewis Nash on drums throughout, with David Finck on bass and Tedd Firth on piano. Gramophone wrote of its treatment of Sondheim’s Broadway songs, “You’d think these have always been jazz standards rather than Broadway numbers.” Her 2026 album I Can Dream, Can’t I?: Illusions and Conversations from the Great American Songbook continued her exploration of the Songbook.

Her concert work has included a long association with Birdland in New York City, including a series of annual residencies. She performed in Paris at Le Bal Blomet, and at the Grand Rex in 2019, where she was the only American among jazz notables including Michel Portal, Ibrahim Maalouf, Biréli Lagrène, and Sylvain Luc, and singers Natalie Dessay and Nana Mouskouri, invited to join a two-day memorial tribute to Michel Legrand. In the United Kingdom, she performed at the Lichfield Festival with James Pearson, artistic director of Ronnie Scott’s, and musicians from Ronnie Scott’s, and later appeared at Ronnie Scott's Jazz Club in London.

In 2023, Errico opened for George Benson at the Montreal International Jazz Festival at the Salle Wilfrid-Pelletier, performing a bilingual program drawing substantially on the music of Michel Legrand as well as the American Songbook. London Jazz News reported that she received a standing ovation. Interviewing her for All About Jazz in 2026, Sherry Rubel wrote of how Errico had over the years "evolved from a theater actress into a 'girl singer' who can hold her own with legends like George Benson."

== Television and film ==
Errico has worked extensively in film and television, with regular or recurring roles in several TV series and roles in a dozen films. In addition to her acting credits, she has curated a festival and a series for French Institute Alliance Française in New York.

=== Television ===
She was a series regular on the CBS drama Central Park West, appearing as Alex Bartoli in 21 episodes, and later had recurring roles on The Knick and Billions.

She has also appeared on The Good Wife, Blue Bloods, Law & Order, A Gifted Man, Six Degrees, Miss Match opposite Alicia Silverstone, Ed, The Norm Show, The Cosby Mysteries, and The Jim Gaffigan Show.

=== Film ===
==== Acting ====
Errico has appeared in films including Picture This, Frequency, Life or Something Like It with Angelina Jolie, Mockingbird Don't Sing, Kevin Bacon's Loverboy, the short film Patrimony with Robert Vaughn, Sofia Coppola's 2020 film On the Rocks and The Magnificent Meyersons.

==== Music ====
In 2013, Errico recorded the theme song for the movie Max Rose. The soundtrack features an original score by Michel Legrand, and Errico sang the main title track, "Hurry Home."

==== Curation ====
In 2019, Errico curated a film festival for French Institute Alliance Française (FIAF) in New York City celebrating movies featuring Michel Legrand's music. In 2021 at the height of the COVID-19 pandemic, Errico and The New Yorker writer Adam Gopnik curated FIAF's new CinéSalon series "Out of the Dark: The Mystery of Film Noir." Incorporating both French and American examples—and some that involve French filmmakers who immigrated to America—the series explored the many sides of the "noir" vision in cinema with special attention paid to the Franco-American dialogue at its core. The series was co-presented by The Cultural Services, a division of the French Embassy in the United States. The Cultural Services were first imagined in the 1930s by Paul Claudel. In 1945 General de Gaulle appointed Claude Lévi-Strauss as the first Cultural Counselor, with the mission of providing Americans (individuals and organizations) with access and resources to engage with French culture and promote it in their own communities.

==== Selected Film Credits ====
- Bury the Evidence — The Wife — 1998
- Picture This — Eve Weidegger — 1999
- Frequency — Samantha Thomas — 2000
- Mockingbird Don't Sing — Sandra Tannen — 2001
- Life or Something Like It — Andrea — 2002
- Loverboy — Miss Silken — 2005
- Patrimony — Caroline — 2011
- On the Rocks — Music Teacher — 2020
- The Magnificent Meyersons — Ilaria Meyerson — 2023

== Recording career ==
Errico has recorded solo albums and appeared on compilations and soundtracks as well as cast albums.

Her solo albums include Legrand Affair, an album of music by Michel Legrand, produced by Phil Ramone and originally released in 2011; an expanded version with many new tracks, Legrand Affair: Deluxe Edition, appeared in 2019. In 2015 Broadway Records released What About Today? Melissa Errico – Live at 54 Below.

Errico has been recognized as an interpreter of Stephen Sondheim's work, with Terry Teachout of The Wall Street Journal calling her 2018 album Sondheim Sublime "the best all-Sondheim album ever recorded." She released a second album of music by Sondheim, Sondheim in the City, in 2024, featuring Sondheim's songs about New York.

In 2022, Errico released Out of the Dark: The Film Noir Project, an album exploring music associated with film noir, with arrangements by Tedd Firth. The recording earned her the 2023 Bistro Award for Concept Recording. The Wall Street Journal wrote that the album "gives us noir music the way we imagine it...melancholy, bittersweet tales of isolation and loneliness, beauty and betrayal—especially relevant at the height of the Covid-19 pandemic...Ms. Errico sings throughout with a tone at once wistful and probing, suggesting that romance and mystery are but different sides of the same coin...we are breathing along with her, seeing what she sees, feeling what she feels...she makes it "uncommonly clear" that we are all silent partners in our own destruction, and that the most we can hope for is a few brief moments of tenderness."

In January 2026, Errico released I Can Dream, Can’t I?: Illusions and Conversations from the Great American Songbook, an album centered on intimate voice-and-piano arrangements with her longtime musical collaborator Tedd Firth. The recording draws from the Great American Songbook as well as songs associated with Peggy Lee, Sérgio Mendes and Joni Mitchell, including “When in Rome (I Do as the Romans Do),” “There’ll Be Another Spring,” “Like a Lover” and “Both Sides, Now.” A five-star review of the album in Stereophile described Errico as a “legit jazz singer with a cabaret artist’s sensibility” and a review in All About Jazz called her "one of the best at keeping classic songs alive."

=== Solo albums ===
- Blue Like That (Manhattan Records/EMI) produced by Arif Mardin – released February 25, 2003
- Lullabies & Wildflowers (Velour/Universal Records, later Ghostlight Records) produced by Rob Mathes – released April 29, 2008
- Legrand Affair (Ghostlight Records) produced by Phil Ramone – released October 18, 2011
- More Lullabies & Wildflowers (Ghostlight Records) – released June 23, 2015
- What About Today? Melissa Errico – Live at 54 Below (Broadway Records) – released October 16, 2015
- Sondheim Sublime (Ghostlight Records) – released November 2, 2018
- Legrand Affair: Deluxe Edition (Ghostlight Records) – released November 8, 2019
- Two Spring Songs for Summer – released July 10, 2020
- Out of The Dark: The Film Noir Project – released in 2022
- Sondheim In The City (Concord Theatricals Recordings, CT00148) – released in 2024
- I Can Dream, Can’t I?: Illusions and Conversations from the Great American Songbook – released January 30, 2026

=== Cast albums ===
- Call Me Madam – Encores Cast (1995)
- High Society – Original Broadway Cast (1998)
- Amour – Original Broadway Cast (2003)
- Finian's Rainbow – Irish Repertory Theater Cast Recording (2004)
- Sadie Thompson – World Premiere Recording (2005)
- Anna Karenina – The Broadway Musical (2007)
- One Touch of Venus – First Complete Recording (2014)

=== Miscellaneous recordings ===
- "Wouldn't It Be Loverly" – The Musicality of Lerner & Loewe.
- "The Mockingbird Song" – Mockingbird Don't Sing soundtrack.
- "Blue Skies/It's a Lovely Day Today" (duet with Malcolm Gets) – The Journey Home.
- "In Love In Vain" from Jerome Kern: Life Upon The Wicked S.T.A.G.E.
- "There's a Small Hotel" & "People Will Say We're In Love" (duet with Patrick Quinn) – "Wall to Wall Richard Rodgers".
- "Have Yourself a Merry Little Christmas" from Weihnachten with José van Dam.
- "Maybe Someone Dreamed Us" from Legrand Affair appears on the Michel Legrand Anthology.
- "Otherwise" by Jane Kenyon – "Poetic License" – 100 poems/100 performers, part 3 (available on ITunes).
- "Hurry Home" – "Max Rose" Original Film Soundtrack.

Errico's recording of a song from David Shire's new musical Table was aired in April 2015 on NPR radio on The Jonathan Schwartz show for WYNC.

== Concerts ==
She reprised her performance as Venus at City Center Encores! Broadway Bash! in November 2001. In 2003, she sang in tribute to Jimmy Webb when Webb received the Johnny Mercer Award at the 2003 Songwriters Hall of Fame induction and awards gala. Errico made her London debut in May 2008 singing in Jerry Herman's Broadway at the London Palladium. In November 2015, she debuted her new one-woman show at Joe's Pub, New York City, co-written with close collaborator Adam Gopnik. Errico has toured with conductor Marvin Hamlisch. In 2016 she appeared at the David Rubenstein Atrium, Lincoln Center, in a talk by Adam Gopnik about Judy Garland. She also performed at Lincoln Center for their American Songbook Series and at Jazz at Lincoln Center with Michael Feinstein. She has also performed with Feinstein at Carnegie Hall.

In 2017 and 2018 she performed runs of her concert of the music of Stephen Sondheim throughout the U.S. and in London and in 2019, she starred as The Baker's Wife in a concert production of Sondheim's Into the Woods on Long Island.

In 2019 she performed concerts featuring the music of Michel Legrand at the Fairmont San Francisco and in NYC at Feinstein's/54 Below. She was the sole American performer at the two-day memorial concert for Legrand in April, 2019 at Paris' Grand Rex and she also performed at London's Legrand memorial concert in September, 2019 at Royal Festival Hall.

In 2019 she performed the National Anthem at Arthur Ashe Stadium at the US Open.

On March 22, 2020, to celebrate his 90th birthday, Guild Hall of East Hampton premiered her Stephen Sondheim concert on YouTube with an exclusive livestream.

On November 18, 2022 Errico made her debut at Carnegie Hall, performing/co-starring with the New York Pops in their concert "Broadway Blockbusters."

In June 2023 Errico opened for George Benson at the Montreal International Jazz Festival at the Salle Wilfrid-Pelletier before a sold-out crowd of 3,000 people, singing a set of music by her mentor the late Michel Legrand. Of the performance, London Jazz News wrote “Errico was energized, making sure with every breath that she would get the audience in the 3000-seater Pelletier really on her side. Every high note was heroically held, and she got a standing ovation from this audience. Montreal audiences always want to show their warmth and this one made her deservedly welcome.” Added the Quebec Journal, in its review, "It was the Italian-American chanteuse Melissa Errico who was responsible for energizing the concert hall, and that she did, expressing herself as fluently in French as in English, and offering a memorable reprise of Legrand's "Valse des Lilas/Once Upon A Summertime."

In 2023 and 2024 Errico and fr: Isabelle Georges performed a concert program titled "Deux Grandes Dames" in London, Paris and New York focusing on the music of Michel Legrand.

Melissa Errico at Birdland in 2025 (photo by Michael Hull)

In 2025, Errico conceived, wrote and starred in The Story of a Rose: A Musical Reverie on the Great War, a concert combining family history, World War I history and early American popular music. The program drew on the story of Errico’s great-aunt, a Ziegfeld Follies performer, and incorporated music associated with Irving Berlin, Jerome Kern, James Reese Europe and others. The production was presented in association with the Doughboy Foundation and the Gary Sinise Foundation.

She has performed her "The Streisand Effect" program at venues including 54 Below in New York, the Smith Center for the Performing Arts in Las Vegas, and Provincetown Town Hall. In this Barbra Streisand-themed show Errico "trace[s] the paths [Barbra] Streisand pioneered for singing actors." A review by Scott Penn of the Provincetown performance in August 2026 with pianist and musical director Billy Stritch, Andy Ezrin, David Finck, and Eric Halvorson, published in Theater Pizzazz, noted that "ovations came in waves" and called Errico and the show "magnificent" and "witty, personal, and completely at ease." Her 2027 schedule includes bookings of "The Streisand Effect" at Birdland in New York and the Kravis Center in West Palm Beach.

On June 2, 2025, Errico performed with her jazz trio at the Festa della Repubblica (Italian Republic Day celebration) hosted by the Consulate General of Italy in New York.

On July 12, 2025 Errico made her London concert-hall debut at Cadogan Hall with Sondheim in the City Live!, focusing on the city-related music of Stephen Sondheim and drawing on her work with the composer. She was joined by Julian Ovenden, pianist Tedd Firth and musicians from Ronnie Scott's Jazz Club. On July 12, 2026, she made her debut at Ronnie Scott's Jazz Club in London with The Summer Knows, a concert celebrating the music of her longtime collaborator and mentor Michel Legrand. Playbill subsequently published a photo gallery that documented the performance, was titled "Melissa Errico Dazzles in Ronnie Scott's Debut in London," and noted that she "received an enthusiastic standing ovation." The concert continued her longstanding association with Legrand’s music, including the album Legrand Affair and performances at memorial concerts for the composer in Paris and London.

On August 16, 2025, Errico appeared with Alec Baldwin in "The Fitzgeralds: A Reading With Music" at Guild Hall in East Hampton, New York. The program marked the centennial of The Great Gatsby and featured an original live score by Forrest Gray.

== Personal life ==
She has two siblings – Mike Errico and Melanie Errico. She met her husband, former tennis professional and ESPN sports commentator Patrick McEnroe, when they were in grade school together. They married on December 19, 1998, at the Holy Trinity Church on W. 82nd Street. She lives in New York, and they have three daughters, including eldest daughter Victoria McEnroe, a former New York State Tennis Championship winner.

== Writing ==
Errico's writing career has developed over the years alongside her work as an actress, singer and concert artist. Her essays and other writing have explored theater, music, New York life and the experience of performing.

Since 2016, Errico has contributed essays to The New York Times on theater, music and the life of a performer. These include columns which discuss returning to ingenue roles later in life, her experience as a headliner performer on a themed cruise, gender politics, her time with composer Michel Legrand, the recent trend of home-taping for auditions, the process of digitally rehearsing and producing a full musical production of Meet Me in St. Louis during the COVID-19 pandemic, a costume fitting for her first live concert since the pandemic began, an essay about being on the road examining a performer's life, before and after the pandemic, and a profile piece on cabaret icon Marilyn Maye ahead of her 95th birthday and long-awaited Carnegie Hall debut.

Errico added to her writings on Stephen Sondheim with a January 2026 contribution to the New York Times feature "5 Minutes That Will Make You Love Sondheim," which also included contributions from Judy Collins, Mandy Patinkin, Renée Fleming, Michael R. Jackson and Tony Kushner. Each contributor selected a work by Sondheim, and Errico chose "Finishing the Hat" from Sunday in the Park with George, writing about the relationship between Sondheim’s music and lyrics and the sacrifices involved in artistic creation. She also discussed her correspondence with Sondheim about interpreting the song from a woman’s perspective. Errico added to her writings on Stephen Sondheim with a January 2026 contribution to the New York Times feature "5 Minutes That Will Make You Love Sondheim," which also included contributions from Judy Collins, Mandy Patinkin, Renée Fleming, Michael R. Jackson and Tony Kushner. Each contributor selected a work by Sondheim, and Errico chose "Finishing the Hat" from Sunday in the Park with George, writing about the relationship between Sondheim’s music and lyrics and the sacrifices involved in artistic creation. She also discussed her correspondence with Sondheim about interpreting the song from a woman’s perspective. Later in 2026 she contributed a story to the Times feature "More New York stories from notable contributors helping to mark Metropolitan Diary's 50th anniversary."

She wrote an expanded article on her experiences with Legrand, which was published in the French magazine fr: La Règle du jeu.

She has also written several essays for the wellness/lifestyle magazine The Purist.

Errico was a principal speaker at the Annual Broadway Blessing in 2013.

== Philanthropy and nonprofit work ==
Errico performed at Merkin Concert Hall in June 2015 to support the Ali Forney Center, which assists homeless LGBT youth. She has supported the non-profit arts organization Sing For Hope and non-profit camp SAY, for children who stutter. Errico appeared in Take Me to the World: A Sondheim 90th Birthday Celebration, a fundraiser for Artists Striving To End Poverty (ASTEP) in April 2020.

=== Bowery Babes ===
In 2006, Errico founded Bowery Babes, a New York-based mothers’ network that later became a 501(c)(3) nonprofit organization. Originating from a prenatal yoga group, the organization grew to more than 5,000 members and provided community resources and peer support concerning breastfeeding, postpartum depression, sleep, relationships and other issues affecting new parents. The group also organized children’s events and participated in relief efforts following Hurricane Sandy. In 2026, after 20 years of operation, Bowery Babes concluded its activities and marked its closure with a $20,000 donation to the Scarlett Fund for pediatric cancer research at Memorial Sloan Kettering Cancer Center.
