= Close at Hand =

EP by James McCartney
- Released: 30 August 2011
- Recorded: Sussex, London, New York
- Genre: Alternative rock
- Length: 22:25
- Label: Engine Company
- Producer: David Kahne; Paul McCartney

James McCartney chronology
Available Light (2010)	Close at Hand (2011)	Me (2013)

Close at Hand is the second EP by James McCartney. It was produced by David Kahne and Paul McCartney, and released on 30 August 2011.

McCartney said of the EP, "There is only one thing to do with high expectations, and that is meet them. I wanted to follow Available Light with something that showed a progression… that had an even deeper meaning, both spiritually and musically."

== Track listing ==
All tracks are written by James McCartney.

No.	Title	Length
1.	"I Only Want to Be Alone"	3:43
2.	"Wings of a Lightest Weight"	3:05
3.	"The Sound of My Voice"	3:21
4.	"Else And Else But Dead"	3:22
5.	"Jesus Be My Friend"	4:39
6.	"Fallen Angel"	4:15
Total length:		22:25
