= Jerry Adler (disambiguation) =

Jerry Adler (1929–2025) was an American actor and director.

Jerry Adler may also refer to:

- Jerry Adler (rock musician), American singer and rock musician
- Jerry Adler (harmonica player) (1918–2010)
