= Jerry Adler (rock musician) =

American singer-songwriter

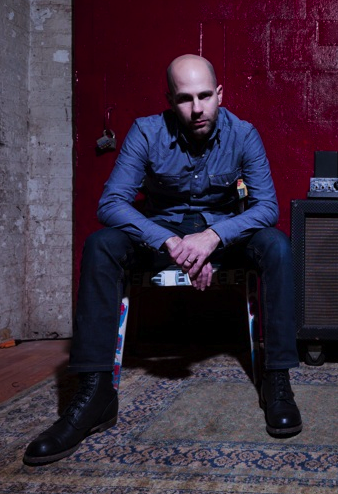
- Born: New York City, New York, U.S.
- Occupations: Musician; singer; record producer
- Years active: 2001–present
- Musical career
- Genres: Indie rock; folk rock
- Instruments: Guitar; bass; pedal steel; keyboards; harmonica; banjo; ukulele; percussion
- Labels: Curb Cut; ECR Music Group
- Member of: Wave Sleep Wave
- Formerly of: The Blam

Jerry Adler is an American rock musician, singer and record producer based in New York City. He is best known as frontman and guitarist of former New York indie rock group The Blam, who wrote three albums before disbanding in 2005. He founded the solo folk project Flugente (pronounced FLOOG-en-teh) in 2006, and released two minimalist albums under the name.

In 2011 he formed the musical duo Wave Sleep Wave with longtime collaborator Yuval Lion. According to a review, "Their sound is a revelric [sic] cavalcade, an intertwined blender of Pixies meets new wave meets psychedelia." In 2011, he founded Curb Cut Records, now a sub-label of ECR Music Group.

== Early life ==
Jerry Adler was born and raised in New York City, and while young he idolized baseball player Graig Nettles. He first started to play guitar using his father's 1949 Gibson LG-1, which he still uses to write songs. At age nine started his first band called The Bed Bugs. He started writing as early as 1993, and took part in the New York group The 527S. Musicians he cited as influences have been Joe Strummer, John Lennon, and Bob Marley, with The Beatles being a particularly strong influence. For lyrics, he has cited poets such as Walt Whitman as inspiration. After learning guitar he also went on to learn instruments such as bass, pedal steel, piano and keyboards, harmonica, banjo, ukulele, percussion, and drum programming.

== Music career ==
=== The Blam ===
In 2001 Adler co-founded the Brooklyn-based indie rock band The Blam. He played guitar and sang vocals, and was joined by guitarist Reuben Maher, bassist Itamar Ziegler, and drummer Yuval Lion. The members had admired each others' separate work for some time, and incorporated influences such as punk, pop, and indie rock. Adler has stated he was especially influenced by The Beatles while writing music for the group.

The band began recording in their own Williamsburg garage studio and released their debut The Blam in 2003. PopMatters praised the album's single "Various Disgraces", calling it "a pristinely catchy song" with a "catchy melody sung by a distorted lead vocal over a rock-steady rhythm section and straight-ahead guitars." They also compared tracks in the album to bands such as The Strokes and Foo Fighters. It received 3/5 stars by AllMusic.

The band released their second album, Caveat Emptor, in 2004, which according to AllMusic featured a "smoother, dreamier style of guitar pop" than the previous album.

After the first albums on Mootron were well-received, the band began working on writing and recording two more, the first of which was titled Blow Wind Blow. It was composed of songs written by Adler from 1996 to 2003. However, the band broke up in 2005 and the album was not released. The band did not get back together. Blow Wind Blow was finally released in 2011, after Jerry signed a deal to distribute his own label Curb Cut Records through New York City's ECR Music Group. It received a glowing review from Lucid Culture, who wrote "Why did the Shins get so popular and not The Blam? The Blam's hooks were just as catchy, their guitars just as jangly, their vocals just as pleasantly pensive." The review also drew comparisons to The Beatles, Elliott Smith, and Neil Finn.

=== Flugente ===
After The Blam split in 2005, Adler founded the solo folk project Flugente (pronounced FLOOG-en-teh) in 2006.

Their solo debut Flugente was released on the label Mootron on September 18, 2007. The tracks use minimalist instrumentation and no overdubs, and each track was recorded as a self-contained performance. It was mastered by Blake Morgan of ECR Music Group. Many of the song lyrics and themes involve Adler's 60-day trip driving through Europe, and according to a review, there is a "confessional aspect of his lyrics, touching on familiar tropes about loss of artistic inspiration, dealing with the locals, and not always knowing the language." Also, "Adler has recorded a series of low-key songs that suit the moody cover art and the sense of getting somewhere to unwind and ruminate. Ultimately, that sense of a reflective state is the album's best point."

A second album, Flugente 2, was released on February 9, 2010, also mastered by Blake Morgan. According to a review, the track "It's Not Just The Summer That's Ending" has a Paul Simon sound, and "There is an honest vulnerability in his voice and his lyrics which are, as any good lyrics of this form, pure poetry. There's human weakness here, and strength. Sadness and hopefulness. In short, an honest song about the human condition."

Curb Cut, being distributed by ECR Music Group, released the Flugente back catalog in fall of 2011. A new record, Will Still Kill, has been announced for release.

=== Wave Sleep Wave ===
Sample of Wave Sleep Wave "Hey...What?"

Adler and drummer Yuval Lion formed a new duo, Wave Sleep Wave, in 2011. Lion plays drums, with Adler again on vocals and guitar. After the release of their free single "Hey...What?", a nine-track eponymous debut has been announced for release on March 27, 2012, through Curb Cut.

According to a review of the upcoming album, "Their sound is a [revelrous] cavalcade, an intertwined blender of Pixies meets new wave meets psychedelia." Cosmo Gaming wrote "Wave Sleep Wave merges elements of indie rock, shoegaze and some post punk with a minimalist aesthetic." Also, "Adler uses his guitar riffs to fill the sound with hazy melodies that stretch across the entire song, at times almost coming to near silence before transitioning into another passage. In this way Wave Sleep Wave is able to create a lot of sound with sparse instrumentation, and listeners may be surprised to find just how textured each song is."

== Personal life ==
Adler and his wife, artist Andrea Frank, live with their daughter in New Paltz, NY.

== Discography ==
=== Albums ===
The Blam

- The Blam (2003)
- Caveat Emptor (2004)
- Blow Wind Blow (2005, official release 2011)

Flugente

- Flugente (2007)
- Flugente 2 (2010)

Wave Sleep Wave

- Wave Sleep Wave (2012)
