= Me (James McCartney album) =

Studio album by James McCartney
- Released: 4 May 2013
- Studio: Hogg Hill Mill (Icklesham); Avatar (New York City); Select (New York City); Abbey Road (London)
- Genre: Alternative rock
- Length: 43:40
- Label: ECR Music Group
- Producer: David Kahne

James McCartney chronology
Close At Hand (2011)	Me (2013)	The Blackberry Train (2016)

Me is the debut full-length studio album by James McCartney. The album was produced by David Kahne and released on 4 May 2013.

James McCartney said of the album: "it's about having as much emotion as possible for me, musically and lyrically. Cathartic, heartfelt and true."

== Track listing ==
All tracks are written by James McCartney.

1. "Strong As You" – 3:17
2. "Butterfly" – 3:46
3. "You & Me Individually" – 4:21
4. "Snap Out of It" – 3:42
5. "Bluebell" – 3:57
6. "Life's a Pill" – 3:09
7. "Home" – 3:44
8. "Thinking About Rock and Roll" – 3:26
9. "Wisteria" – 3:15
10. "Mexico" – 3:00
11. "Snow" – 4:57
12. "Virginia" (bonus track) – 3:06

== Personnel ==
- James McCartney – lead vocals, guitar, bass, piano, drums
- Paul McCartney – backing vocals, guitar
- Hugh Longcroft Neal – guitar, keyboards
- Jay Ledger – guitar
- Oliver McKiernan – bass guitar
- Tobias Humble – drums
- Shawn Pelton – drums
- Steven Isserlis – cello
- Kate Davis – backing vocals
- Roy Hendrickson – engineer
