= Silencer (Blake Morgan album) =

Studio album by Blake Morgan
- Released: October 25, 2006
- Genre: Pop, acoustic
- Label: ECR Music Group
- Producer: Blake Morgan

Blake Morgan chronology
Burning Daylight (2005)	Silencer (2006)	Diamonds In The Dark (2013)

Silencer is a 2006 acoustic album by American singer-songwriter Blake Morgan. It features Morgan on vocals and piano performing acoustic versions of both new and older material, dating back to 1996. A cover of "No Surprises" by Radiohead was also released as a digital bonus track.

== Reception ==
AllMusic gave the album 3 out of 5 stars and said "These are darkly heartfelt, enigmatic and melodic songs that often bring to mind a mix of the yearning, expansive rock of the Smashing Pumpkins and the soulful AM pop of Todd Rundgren. Meditative and sanguine, these are afterglow torch songs for the alt rock set."

== Track listing ==
1. "Silver Lining" - 4:11
2. "Danger To Wake You" - 3:37
3. "Sick For You" - 3:23
4. "It's Gone" - 4:55
5. "Saccharine" - 4:39
6. "Burn You Down" - 4:04
7. "Craze" - 4:36
8. "Out of Loss" - 4:15
9. "Better Angeles" - 4:44
10. "No Surprises" - 3:46
