= David Cloyd =

American singer-songwriter

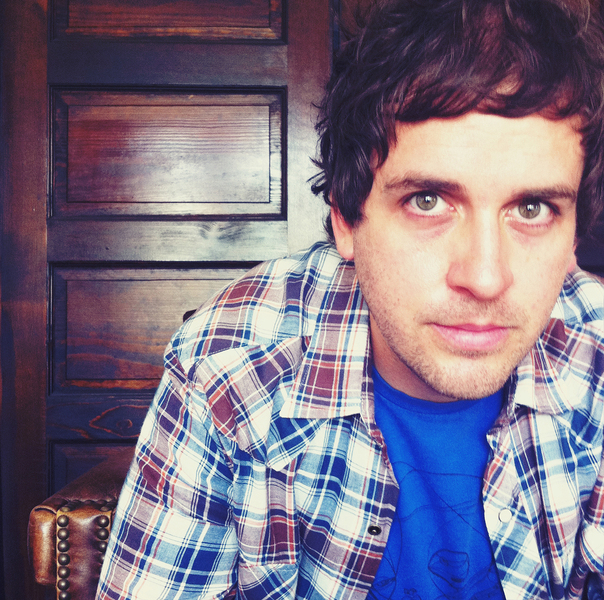

Background information
- Born: 1974 (age 51–52); Wilmington, Ohio, U.S.
- Genres: Rock music, Indie rock
- Occupations: singer-songwriter, music producer, engineer
- Instruments: Vocals, piano, guitar, bass
- Years active: 2009–present
- Label: ECR Music Group
- Website: DavidCloydMusic.com

David Cloyd (born 1974) is an American singer-songwriter, multi-instrumentalist, music producer, and music engineer. After playing for a decade in Brooklyn, New York in the indie rock scene, he was signed to ECR Music Group in 2008. He released his debut album as a singer-songwriter with Unhand Me, You Fiend! in 2009. The album peaked at No. 1 on eMusic's Album Charts, and according to a review, "took the indie rock scene by storm." His second album, I Could Disappear, included solo versions of his debut album, with Cloyd on vocals, piano, and guitar. Cloyd released a cover of Paul McCartney's 1971 song "Dear Boy" in September 2011. As of 2012, he is Executive Vice President of Creative Operations at ECR Music Group.

== Early life, career ==
David Cloyd was born in 1974 in Wilmington, Ohio. A multi-instrumentalist, he has stated he didn't write much music when he was younger, becoming a singer-songwriter only later in his life. He began attending the College of Fine Arts at the University of Texas at Austin in 1994, where he majored in music performance.

After graduating in 1998 he moved from Austin, Texas to Brooklyn, New York. He began working at EMI Music Publishing after winning the first internship with the Joni Abbott Foundation. People involved in the internship included executives Rick Krim and Evan Lamberg at EMI, Don Henley, Tom Freston of MTV, and John Sykes of VH1, who started the Save The Music Foundation.

He met his wife, Jaime Herbeck, in April 2006. Herbeck, who was then a managing editor at Hyperion Books (and later Picador), was born in 1977. Cloyd played regularly in New York's indie rock scene, but his band broke up in early 2007. At that point he had written a number of songs, a process which he had started in earnest in late 2006. Cloyd, who lived with his wife in a tiny apartment in Brooklyn's Sunset Park, had no excess funds for studio time. He created his own 9x9 foot studio in his apartment, and used a homebuilt computer, two cheap monitors, a condensor microphone, an electric and acoustic guitar, a bass guitar, a keyboard, two amplifiers, and a drum machine to begin creating an album. He borrowed an amp from friend and neighbor Shara Worden, who had previously given him vocal lessons. They had also shared band members in earlier groups, including Konrad Meissner, who now plays with Matt Nathanson.

Cloyd's homemade recordings were discovered by Blake Morgan of ECR Music Group (Engine Company Records). Morgan began helping set deadlines for Cloyd to finish tracks in his home studio, and began mixing the recordings. He has stated "[Cloyd] was actually in the perfect environment, at the perfect time. I didn´t want him to change the way he was working, or how, I just wanted him to keep going."

In May 2008, Cloyd and his wife moved to Buffalo, New York, Herbeck's hometown. Cloyd began to teach music lessons and continued work on his debut album.

== Solo career ==
=== Unhand Me, You Fiend! (2009) ===
Cloyd's debut album, Unhand Me, You Fiend! was released on January 20, 2009 on ECR Music Group. He composed, performed, and engineered all tracks on the LP, and co-produced the album with Blake Morgan. Morgan mixed and edited, and Phil Nicolo mastered the album at Studio 4 in Philadelphia. The album included Cloyd's cover of Radiohead's "Weird Fishes / Arpeggi" from In Rainbows as a bonus track.

Following its release worldwide, the album peaked at No. 1 on eMusic's Album Charts. According to a review, the album "took the indie rock scene by storm." In October 2009, he was selected as the winner of the "Artvoice Battle of Original Music" by Art Voice, where he competed against the Bear Exchange.

==== Reception ====
His vocals on the album were compared to David Berkeley and Jeff Buckley. Also, "The often densely layered music has echoes of the Beatles, Matthew Sweet and Elliott Smith, and stylistically sits comfortably among the work of contemporaries like Rufus Wainwright, Duncan Sheik and Kevin Tihista’s Red Terror." Another review stated that Cloyd "uses this album to convey the struggles of everyday life."

eMusic wrote "Having recently departed New York City for Buffalo, you can almost hear the isolation in David Cloyd's debut. Unhand Me, You Fiend! jumps between folky, Jeff Buckley-esque ballads, minor-key raucous indie-guitar workouts and, errr, a Radiohead cover (that's actually quite great!). It seems the work of a single, quirky mind with a lot of time on its hands — and it's a joy to listen to."

Melodic.net gave it 4/4 stars and wrote "New talent David Cloyd...offers a stylish and at times complex pop journey. With floating melodies built with acoustic elements and technical details... if you like cool pop in a slightly odd and very personal style, this is a must album."

=== I Could Disappear (2010) ===
On June 29, 2010, Cloyd released his second album, I Could Disappear. The nine studio tracks are all solo reworkings of the original pop and rock songs from his debut album. According to Cloyd, "With each song boiled down to its essence I discovered something exciting—working with less demands more from you as an artist." He performed vocals, alternating with piano and electric guitar. He also engineered the album and created the album cover.

=== Dear Boy (2011) ===
Cloyd released a cover of Paul McCartney's 1971 song "Dear Boy" on September 13, 2011. ECR Music Group released it in digital format only.

As of 2011 he is Executive Vice President at ECR Music Group, and also continues to produce music for other musicians.

== Personal life ==
Cloyd is married to Jaime Herbeck. Their first child, a daughter, was born in 2009.

== Discography ==
=== Albums ===
- 2009: Unhand Me, You Fiend!
- 2010: I Could Disappear

=== Singles ===
- 2011: "Dear Boy" (cover of song by Paul McCartney)
