= Michel Legrand =

French film score composer (1932–2019)

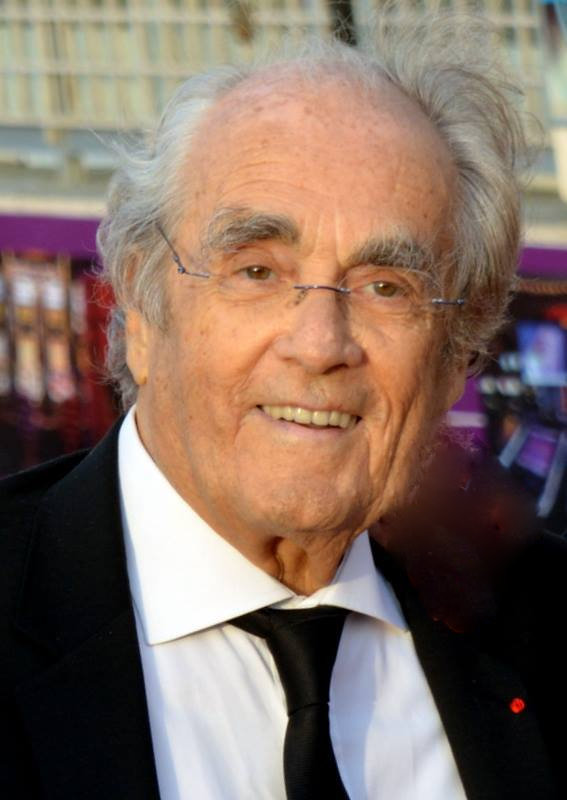
- Legrand at the 2015 Cabourg Film Festival
- Born: Michel Jean Legrand; 24 February 1932; Paris, France
- Died: 26 January 2019 (aged 86); Neuilly-sur-Seine, France
- Occupations: Film score composer; jazz pianist
- Years active: 1946–2019

Michel Jean Legrand (French pronunciation: [miʃɛl ləɡʁɑ̃]; 24 February 1932 – 26 January 2019) was a French musical composer, arranger, conductor, jazz pianist, and singer. Legrand was a prolific composer, having written more than 200 film and television scores, in addition to many songs. His scores for two of the films of French New Wave director Jacques Demy, The Umbrellas of Cherbourg (1964) and The Young Girls of Rochefort (1967), earned Legrand his first Academy Award nominations. Legrand won his first Oscar for the song "The Windmills of Your Mind" from The Thomas Crown Affair (1968), and additional Oscars for Summer of '42 (1971) and Barbra Streisand's Yentl (1983).

== Life and career ==
Legrand was born in Paris, France, to his father, Raymond Legrand, who was himself a conductor and composer, and his mother, Marcelle Der-Mikaëlian, who was the sister of conductor Jacques Hélian. Raymond and Marcelle were married in 1929. His maternal grandfather was Armenian.

Legrand composed more than two hundred film and television scores. He won three Oscars and five Grammys. He studied music at the Conservatoire de Paris from the age of 11, working with, among others, Nadia Boulanger and graduated with top honors as both a composer and a pianist. He burst upon the international music scene at 22 when his 1954 album I Love Paris became a surprise hit. He established his name in the United States by working with such jazz stars as Miles Davis and Stan Getz. His sister Christiane Legrand was a member of The Swingle Singers and his niece Victoria Legrand is a member of the dream pop band Beach House.

Legrand composed music for Jacques Demy's films The Umbrellas of Cherbourg (1964) (from which "Recit de Cassard" came and in turn, in English became the standard "Watch What Happens") and The Young Girls of Rochefort (1967), from which the relyricized "You Must Believe in Spring" is considered a jazz standard. Legrand appeared and performed in Agnès Varda's Cléo from 5 to 7 (1961). He also composed music for Joseph Losey's Eva (1962), The Thomas Crown Affair (1968) (which features "The Windmills of Your Mind"), Ice Station Zebra (1968), The Picasso Summer (1969), The Lady in the Car with Glasses and a Gun (1970), The Go-Between (1971), Summer of '42 (1971), Clint Eastwood's Breezy (1973), The Three Musketeers (1973), Orson Welles's last-completed film F for Fake (1974), TriStar Pictures 1998 family film Madeline, and would later compose the score for Welles's posthumously released movie The Other Side of the Wind (2018). He also composed the score for Yentl (1983), as well as the film score for Louis Malle's film Atlantic City (1980). His instrumental version of the theme from Brian's Song charted 56th in 1972 on the Billboard's pop chart.

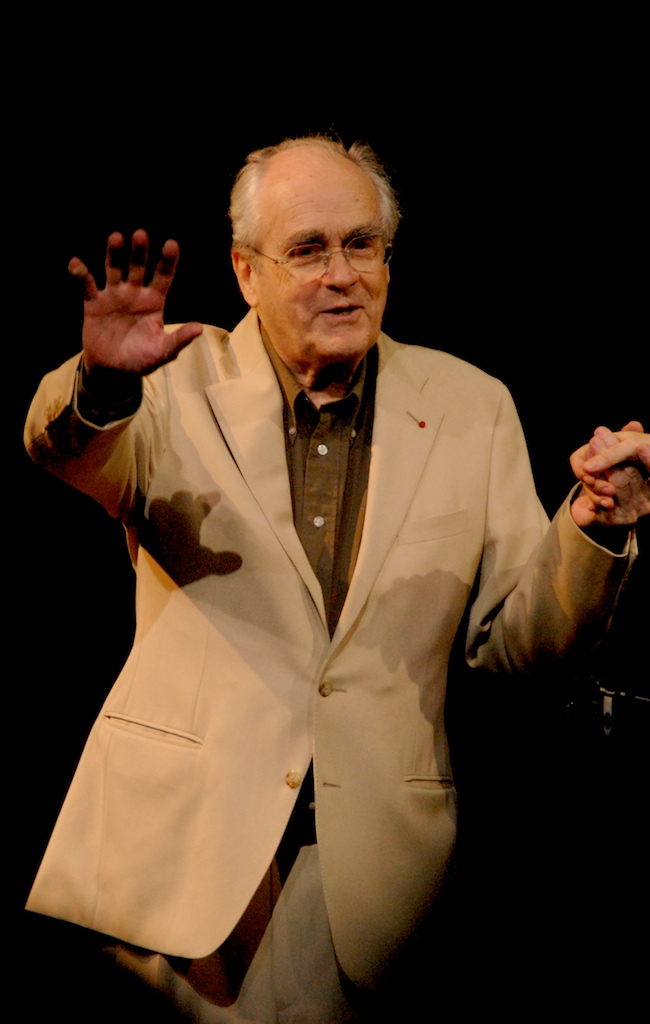
Legrand in 2008

Legrand died of sepsis, during the night of 25–26 January 2019, at the American Hospital of Paris in Neuilly-sur-Seine, where he had been hospitalized for two weeks for a pulmonary infection. His funeral was held in Paris at the Alexander Nevsky Cathedral on 1 February 2019. He was interred at the Père Lachaise Cemetery. He remained active until his death and had concerts scheduled to take place in the spring.

== Musical theatre ==
In 1997, Legrand composed the score for the musical Le Passe-muraille, with a book by Didier Van Cauwelaert. It premiered on Broadway in 2002 as Amour and was translated into English by Jeremy Sams and was directed by James Lapine. This musical was his Broadway debut and he was nominated for a Tony Award in 2003 for Best Score. Later he recorded Legrand Affair with Melissa Errico, a 100-piece symphony orchestra that included songs with lyrics by Alan and Marilyn Bergman.

The world premiere of the new musical Marguerite from Alain Boublil and Claude-Michel Schönberg, the creators of Les Misérables and Miss Saigon, included music by Michel Legrand and lyrics by Herbert Kretzmer. Marguerite is set during World War II in occupied Paris, and was inspired by the romantic novel La Dame aux Camélias by Alexandre Dumas fils. It premiered in May 2008 at the Haymarket Theatre, London and was directed by Jonathan Kent.

== Awards ==
Legrand won three Oscars (from 13 nominations), five Grammys, and was nominated for an Emmy. His first Academy Award win was in 1969 for the song "The Windmills of Your Mind", followed with the Academy Award for his music for Summer of ’42 in 1972 and for Yentl in 1984.

Following are a selection of the awards and nominations with which Legrand's works have been honored:

=== Academy Award awards and nominations ===
Source: AllMovie

- Best Original Score, Substantially Original Score: The Umbrellas of Cherbourg (1965) – nominated
- Best Original Score for a Motion Picture (not a Musical): The Thomas Crown Affair (1968) – nominated
- Best Original Song Score and Its Adaptation or Best Adaptation Score: The Young Girls of Rochefort (1968) – nominated
- Best Original Dramatic Score: Summer of '42 (1971) – won
- Best Original Song Score and Its Adaptation or Best Adaptation Score: Yentl (1983) – won
- Best Original Song:
  - "I Will Wait for You" from The Umbrellas of Cherbourg (1965) – nominated
  - "The Windmills of Your Mind" from The Thomas Crown Affair (1968) – won
  - "What Are You Doing the Rest of Your Life?" from The Happy Ending (1969) – nominated
  - "Pieces of Dreams" from Pieces of Dreams (1970) – nominated
  - "How Do You Keep the Music Playing?" from Best Friends (1982) – nominated
  - "Papa, Can You Hear Me?" from Yentl (1983) – nominated
  - "The Way He Makes Me Feel" from Yentl (1983) – nominated

=== Golden Globe awards and nominations ===
Source: All Movie

- Original Score:
  - The Thomas Crown Affair (1968)
  - The Happy Ending (1969)
  - Wuthering Heights (1970)
  - Le Mans (1971)
  - Summer of '42 (1971)
  - Lady Sings the Blues (1972)
  - Breezy (1973)
  - Yentl (1983)
- Original Song:
  - "The Windmills of Your Mind" from The Thomas Crown Affair (1968) (won)
  - "What are You Doing the Rest of Your Life?" from The Happy Ending (1969)
  - "Pieces of Dreams" from Pieces of Dreams (1970)
  - "Breezy's Song" from Breezy (1973)
  - "Yesterday's Dreams" from Falling in Love Again (1980)
  - "The Way He Makes Me Feel" from Yentl (1983)

=== Grammy Award awards and nominations ===
Source: Grammy.com

- Best Instrumental Composition: "Theme from Summer of '42 (The Summer Knows)" (1971) – win
- Best Instrumental Arrangement: "Theme From Summer Of '42" (1971) – nomination
- Best Pop Instrumental Performance: "Theme From Summer Of '42" (1971) – nomination
- Best arrangement accompanying vocalist: What Are You Doing the Rest of Your Life? (Sarah Vaughan) (1972) – win
- Song of the year: "The Summer Knows" from Summer of '42 (1972) – nomination
- Best Arrangement Accompanying Vocalist(s): "The Summer Knows" (1972) – nomination
- Best instrumental composition: "Brian's Song" [TV] (1972) – win
- Album of Best Original Score Written for a Motion Picture or Television Special: The Three Musketeers (1974) – nomination
- Best Instrumental Composition: "Images" (1975) win
- Best Jazz Performance by a Big Band: "Images" (1975) win
- Best Album of Original Score Written for a Motion Picture or a Television Special: Yentl (1984) – nomination
- Best Instrumental Arrangement Accompanying Vocals: Yentl (Barbra Streisand) (1984) – nomination
- Best Instrumental Arrangement Accompanying Vocals: "Nature Boy" (track from "Unforgettable") (1991) – nomination
- Best Instrumental Arrangement: "Where Or When" (Track from: "Happy Radio Days", Erato Records) (1998) – nomination

=== Theatre nominations ===
- Tony Award for Best Original Score: Amour (2002)
- Drama Desk Award for Outstanding Music and Outstanding Orchestrations: Amour (2002)

=== Emmy Award nominations ===
- Outstanding Achievement in Music Composition for a Limited Series or a Special (Dramatic Underscore): A Woman Called Golda [TV] (1982)

=== Fennecus nominations ===
- Song score, original or adaptation: Yentl (1983)
- Original song: "The Way He Makes Me Feel" from Yentl (1983)

=== Apex nominations ===
- Original score, comedy: Best Friends (1982)
- Original song, drama: "The Way He Makes Me Feel" from Yentl (1983)
- Original song score/adaptation/compilation, drama: Yentl (1983)

=== Australian Film Institute Award ===
- Best Original Music Score: Dingo (1991) win

=== Prix Moliere Award ===
- Best musical (1997): Le Passe-Muraille (French stage version of Amour)

=== ASCAP ===
- Henry Mancini Award, awarded by ASCAP, for Le Passe-Muraille (1998)

=== Golden Eagle Award ===
- Golden Eagle Award: Outstanding contribution to world cinema (2002)

=== Others ===
- In 2018, asteroid 31201 Michellegrand was named in his honour.

=== Documentary ===
"Michel Legrand, let the music play", directed by Gregory Monro in 2018

"Once upon a time Michel Legrand", directed by David Hertzog Dessites in 2024
