= Janita =

American singer

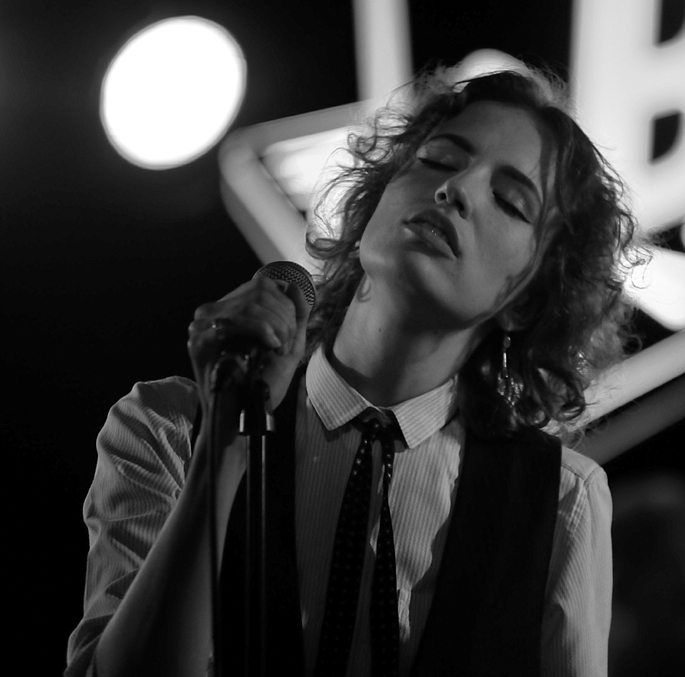

Background information
- Born: Janita Maria Raukko; 28 December 1978 (age 47); Helsinki, Finland
- Genres: Soul; alternative; pop; smooth jazz
- Occupation: Singer-songwriter
- Instruments: Vocals; piano; guitar; percussion
- Years active: 1992–present
- Labels: Reel Art; Dig It; 550 Music; Epic; Carport Music; Ofir Music; Lightyear; Jupiter; Texicalli; ECR Music Group
- Website: www.janita.com

Janita Maria (née Raukko; born 28 December 1978), better known mononymously as Janita, (pronounced "YA-nee-tah") is a Finnish-born, American singer-songwriter. Born in Helsinki, she started her career in Finland and later moved to Brooklyn at the age of 17 together with her then manager Tomi Ervi. Janita has released nine albums in her native Finland, some of which reached the top forty chart in Finland. Her third US album, Didn't You My Dear?, was released worldwide in March 2015 on ECR Music Group.

== Early life and career ==
Janita Maria was born 28 December 1978 in Helsinki, Finland. She learned to sing before she could talk, and began playing electric piano at age three. She started writing her own songs on piano at age four, and often performed and danced with the encouragement of family and her mother. While she was never formally trained in singing, she seriously studied both classical piano and ballet. She was exposed to diverse music at a young age, often singing along to soul music, hip hop, and R&B.

At age 13 she met her long-term songwriting partner and musical collaborator Tomi Ervi (aka Tomi Sachary). She began recording and performing pop vocals with Ervi. Janita signed to the label Reel Art at age 13, who released her first single, "Jos Jäät", in 1992. Her full debut album, Oma Planeetta, followed in 1993. A second album, Sävyjä, was released in 1994 on Reel Art.

As a teenager she soon broke into the mainstream in Finland, and became a fixture on radio, television, and on the touring and commercial circuits. According to The Daily Telegraph, as a teenager she was "Finland's biggest popstar". She also won two Finnish Emma Awards. Her third album, Believer, was released on Dig It Records in 1997, peaking at number fourteen on the Finnish Albums Chart. Dig It also released her single "Ready or Not" around that time.

== Adult career ==
=== Janita (1998) ===
Janita moved to Brooklyn, New York City at age 17. She was quickly signed to Sony Music Entertainment's 550 Music at age 18. Janita, which included new music and the track "Getting Over" from Believer, was released in Australia and Japan in 1998, and also released in Finland. The album was never officially released in the United States by Sony as a result of label infighting.

=== I'll Be Fine (2001) ===
Janita chose to leave Sony and independently released her fifth album I'll Be Fine in 2001, which featured both her songwriting and vocals. This served as Janita's American debut album, and the song "I'll Be Fine" was released as a single. A Finnish version of the album, "Tunteita," reached number thirty-seven on the Finnish chart. According to SoulTracks, "I'll Be Fine" was released to generally positive reviews for its "brand of smooth, jazz-infused vocal music," and also showed her growing talent as a songwriter.

=== Seasons of Life (2005) ===
Janita's sixth studio album Seasons of Life was released in Finland in 2005 by Ofir Music and Reel Art, reaching number thirty-one on the Finnish Albums Chart. The album was released in the United States (her second release there) on 16 May 2006 by Lightyear Entertainment and in Japan on 21 September 2006 by Victor Entertainment, including a cover of Depeche Mode's "Enjoy the Silence" as a bonus track, which peaked at number thirty-six on Billboard's Jazz Songs on 12 August 2006. A 12" vinyl containing three remixed tracks from the album was released in 2006 on Lightyear. SoulTracks review stated that: "Janita's wispy, pretty voice works well with the restrained, jazzy arrangements, creating a tasty, very listenable collection. Most notable are the album's compositions (generally written by Janita and Sachary), which are the best of her career."

=== Haunted (2010) ===
On 27 July 2010, Janita released her seventh studio album Haunted worldwide on Blake Morgan's independent label Engine Company Records (now ECR Music Group). According to Janita, interacting with Meshell Ndegeocello partially convinced her to try a new alternative direction with the album. "She exposed me to music I hadn't explored before. I loved it. Totally devoured it. I moved into Keane, Tom Waits, Radiohead, Smashing Pumpkins, Hole, and PJ Harvey. A natural progression."

For the album she worked with co-producer Jamie Siegel, whose credits include the Smashing Pumpkins and Joss Stone. The album was first mastered and edited at Masterdisk in New York for the Finnish release, then later remastered and resequenced by Morgan. SonicScoop wrote, "If the sonic purity and emotional intensity of Haunted sounds like it's coming from somewhere very real, it's because it is. Hearts broke in the making, as Janita split with her longtime collaborator/life partner Tomi Sachary even as he served as co-producer on the album. Along the way, Janita [...] crafted a collection of songs that leaves her adult contemporary reputation—foisted on her by years of chart-chasing advice—in the dust."

=== Didn't You, My Dear? (2015) ===
Janita's eighth album, Didn't You, My Dear?, was released worldwide 31 March 2015, on ECR Music Group. It had its official album release concert on 26 March at New York's Webster Hall. With her material on the record, Janita is drawing comparisons to Blonde Redhead and Patti Smith among others. Blake Morgan, ECR Music Group founder-owner, produced Didn’t You, My Dear? at his Manhattan studio. Aside from retouching and releasing Janita's 2010 release Haunted, this album was the first the two have made from scratch together. Of Didn't You, My Dear?, Baeblemusic.com states: "Janita's voice is hauntingly beautiful and delightfully rich. Her music is as multi-faceted as it is intelligent, incorporating flecks of R&B, jazz, indie folk and alternative. And more than anything, it's extremely digestible without sacrificing depth, a very rare characteristic."

=== Here Be Dragons (2021) ===
Janita's latest album, Here Be Dragons, was released 14 May 2021, also on ECR Music Group. Jani Lehtinen writes on tuonelamagazine.com that "The mosaic of emotions patterned by all these sonic vignets is deeply haunting, so it is no wonder why critics seem to fall in love with the album all over the world.".

She continues to perform music from her albums live, and her performances have been described by critics as "alternately sultry and savage".

== Personal life ==
Janita married her long-term boyfriend and her producer Tomi Ervi in July 2004 but filed for divorce in Helsinki District Court 4 years later in 2008. Tomi Ervi is 17 years older than Janita and they met when Janita was only 13 years old and Mr. Ervi 30. They moved to Brooklyn, New York when Janita was 17. Janita still resides in Brooklyn and no longer has relations with Tomi Ervi. The Daily Telegraph noted that as of 2011, "her personal style is verging on androgynous; she cut off her long blonde hair and wears men’s suits on stage—a reaction to the over sexualised image promoted by her earlier managers, perhaps."

== Activism ==
Janita became an American citizen in 2013, and since early 2014 has represented the #IRespectMusic campaign, the grassroots movement that has been galvanizing musicians on their right to get paid for airplay. She has joined the movement's leader Blake Morgan in pushing for legislation to make crucial change in this area. (ref. One Track Mine, Broadway World) Janita has traveled back and forth to Washington DC to meet with Congressmen and women including Representatives Marsha Blackburn, Jerrold Nadler, Doug Collins and Ted Deutch, as well as representatives of the National Music Publishers' Association and the Recording Industry Association of America. On 13 April 2015 the movement's hard work was rewarded with a bill introduced, proposing federal legislation that broadcast companies be forced to begin paying artists and record labels for songs played on terrestrial radio. (Ref: Tennessean)

== Discography ==
=== Albums ===
Studio

- Oma Planeetta (1992)
- Sävyjä (1994)
- Believer (1997)
- Janita (1998)
- I'll Be Fine (2001) [released in Finnish as Tunteita in Finland]
- Seasons of Life (2005)
- Haunted (2010)
- Didn't You, My Dear? (2015)
- Here Be Dragons (2021)
- Mad Equation (est. 2025)

Compilations

- Kokoelma (2003)

=== Singles ===
- "Jos Jäät" (1992)
- "Sävyjä" (1994)
- "Ready or Not" (1997)
- "Getting Over" (1998)
- "Brand New Diva" (1998, Japan only)
- "I'll Be Fine" (2001)
- "Angel Eyes" (2001)
- "Firefly" (2002)
- "Enjoy the Silence" (2006)
- "I Miss You" (2006)
- "Do We Learn" (2010)
- "Beautiful You Are" (2015)
- "Not What You're Used To" (2020)
- "Digging In The Dirt" (2021)
