= James McCartney =

English-American musician and songwriter (born 1977)

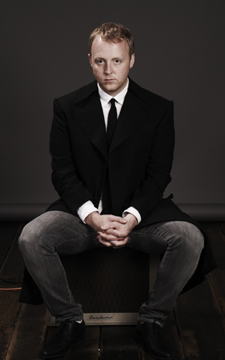
- McCartney in 2011

Background information
- Born: James Louis McCartney; 12 September 1977 (age 48); London, England
- Genres: Rock
- Occupations: Musician, writer
- Instruments: Vocals; guitar; bass; piano; mandolin; drums
- Years active: 1997–present

James Louis McCartney (born 12 September 1977) is an English musician and songwriter. He has released several recordings in his own name and contributed to albums by his parents Paul and Linda McCartney.

== Early life ==
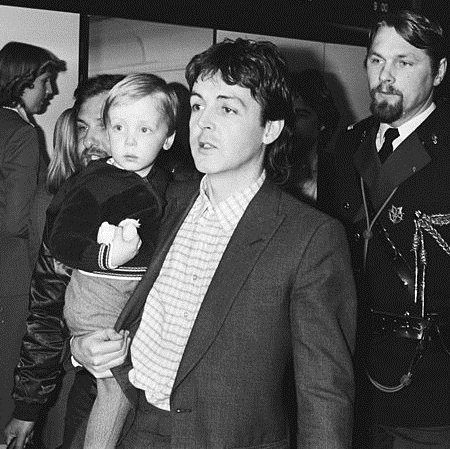
Two-year-old James in 1980, carried by his father Paul McCartney

James Louis McCartney was born at Avenue Clinic in St John's Wood, London on 12 September 1977. He is the son of songwriter and former Beatle Paul McCartney and his first wife Linda McCartney. He was named after both his paternal grandfather Jim McCartney and his father, whose full name is James Paul McCartney, as well as Linda's late mother, Louise Sara (née Lindner) Eastman. His mother was Jewish, and his father is the son of a Catholic mother of Irish descent.

He spent the first two and a half years of his life on the road while his parents toured with their band Wings. After the band broke up in 1980, the McCartneys settled in Rye, East Sussex. He attended the local state secondary school, the Thomas Peacocke Community College. He has said his earliest inspiration to learn guitar was Michael J. Fox in Back to the Future. He began playing music when his father gave him a Fender Stratocaster at age nine. The guitar had previously been owned by Carl Perkins.

In 1989, McCartney and his sisters Mary McCartney and Stella McCartney again joined Paul and Linda on a world tour. He continued his education with a tutor while on the road. In 1993, at age 16, while surfing with friends, he was swept out to sea. The coast guard was called, his family rushed to the site, but he emerged safe on his own 40 minutes later. In 1995, James introduced his sister Mary to television producer Alistair Donald, whom she later married.

On 17 April 1998, in Tucson, Arizona, James, along with his father and sisters, was at his mother's side when she died from breast cancer, which had been diagnosed in 1995. Later that year, he graduated from Bexhill College, near his home in East Sussex, where he pursued studies in A-level Art and Sculpture.

== Music career ==
=== 1997–2007: Early years ===
James has played guitar and drums on some of his father's solo albums, including Flaming Pie (1997) and Driving Rain (2001), as well as co-writing a few songs. On Flaming Pie he has an electric guitar solo on the track "Heaven on a Sunday". On Driving Rain, he co-wrote the songs "Spinning on an Axis" and "Back in the Sunshine Again" with his father, and played percussion on the former track and guitar on the latter.

He also plays lead guitar on his mother's posthumously released solo album, Wide Prairie (1998), which included tracks recorded privately over the previous twenty years.

In 2004, he again left the McCartney family home and began living in a flat in Brighton, where he waited tables while he attended college and worked on his music. In 2005, he accompanied Paul during his 'US' Tour.

=== 2008–2011: Available Light and Close at Hand ===
Around 2008, he began working with David Kahne, his father, and a number of other musicians on recording his own music. He made his US performing debut with his own original solo material on 14 November 2009 at the Fairfield Arts & Convention Center, during the Fourth Annual David Lynch Weekend for World Peace and Meditation in Fairfield, Iowa. He performed under the pseudonym Light.

Available Light was McCartney's first official release as both a performer and songwriter. The EP included four original songs composed by James as well as a cover of Neil Young's classic "Old Man". In addition to composing the songs and singing, he plays electric and acoustic guitar, mandolin, piano and bass on the recordings. Produced by David Kahne and Paul McCartney, the EP was recorded between Sussex, London and New York over the previous year, including Abbey Road Studios.

He stated, "The music was inspired by The Beatles, Nirvana, The Cure, PJ Harvey, Radiohead—and all good music. It is basically rock n' roll, clean sounding and vocal. The words on the album refer to spirituality, love, family, trying to sort out one's life, and many other things".

He previewed tracks from Available Light when he toured the UK for the first time in February and March 2010, though he at first performed under a pseudonym. The album was released electronically September 2010 on Blake Morgan's Engine Company Records, (now ECR Music Group) to positive reviews. Close at Hand, his second EP, was released in 2011.

McCartney's The Complete EP Collection was released on 22 November 2011. The album combines the previous two EPs along with five new original tracks and two new covers. It is his first physical release, the two individual EPs being digital only. Like the EPs, it was produced by Paul McCartney and David Kahne, and is being released by Engine Company Records (now ECR Music Group). Rolling Stone called the opening track, "Angel", a "light and cheerful pop track". AntiMusic dubbed the release "whimsical and reflective, sharp-witted and affectionate. Full of smart, engaging pop songwriting". In a Rolling Stone song exclusive about the track New York Times, James notes he composed the main riff on a family trip when his father "... was just inches away from me".

=== 2012–2016 ===
In April 2012, McCartney told a BBC interviewer that he had mooted the idea "a little bit" of forming a "next generation" version of the Beatles with Sean Lennon, Zak Starkey, and Dhani Harrison.

McCartney released his first album on 21 May 2013, titled Me. The album was supported by a tour of the US, starting on 6 April 2013.

McCartney played at San Francisco's Outside Lands Music Festival in August 2013. He recorded The Beatles' "Hello, Goodbye" with The Cure for the album The Art of McCartney, a collection of Beatles, Wings and Paul McCartney solo covers.

McCartney's second studio album, The Blackberry Train, was released on 6 May 2016.

=== 2016–present ===
In February 2024, McCartney released "Beautiful", his first new music in nearly eight years. In April, he released the single "Primrose Hill". The song features a collaboration with Sean Lennon, son of John Lennon. In May, McCartney released his third single, "Nothing". On 18 October 2024, McCartney released his third studio album, Beautiful Nothing.

== Personal life ==
Like his elder sister Heather McCartney, James lived a relatively private life before going out on tour for his music. His other sisters are Stella, a fashion designer, and Mary, a photographer. He has a much younger half-sister, Beatrice Milly McCartney, born in 2003 to Paul and his second wife, Heather Mills.

McCartney practises Transcendental Meditation. He follows a vegetarian diet, leaning towards veganism, and is an animal rights activist.

In November 2012, James performed at a London benefit for the David Lynch Foundation, which his father also supports.

== Discography ==
=== Studio albums ===
- Me (2013)
- The Blackberry Train (2016)
- Beautiful Nothing (2024)

=== Extended plays ===
- Available Light (2010)
- Close at Hand (2011)

=== Singles ===
- "Beautiful" (2024)
- "Primrose Hill" (2024) (with Sean Lennon)
- "Nothing" (2024)
- "Circle Game" (2024)
- "I'm Yours" (2024)
- "Different People" (2025)
- "Heaven" (2025)
- "Ribbons" (2025)
- "Me And You" (2026)

=== Compilation albums ===
- The Complete EP Collection (2011)

=== Collaborations ===
- Flaming Pie (1997) by Paul McCartney
- Wide Prairie (1998) by Linda McCartney
- Driving Rain (2001) by Paul McCartney
- The Art of McCartney (2014)
