= Legrand Affair =

Legrand affair
- Album cover of "Deluxe Edition"

Studio album by Melissa Errico
- Released: October 18, 2011
- Genre: Vocal & Easy Listening
- Length: 66:25
- Label: Sh-K-Boom
- Producer: Phil Ramone

Melissa Errico chronology
Lullabies & Wildflowers (2008)	Legrand affair (2011)

Legrand Affair is the third solo recording from singer and actress, Melissa Errico was produced by Phil Ramone, and co-produced by Richard Jay-Alexander. Released 18 October 2011, the album was distributed through Sh-K-Boom records.

== Track listing ==
No.	Title	Writer(s)	Length
1	I Was Born In Love With You	Michel Legrand, Alan & Marilyn Bergman	4:37
2	The Summer Knows	Michel Legrand, Alan & Marilyn Bergman	5:39
3	His eyes, her eyes	Michel Legrand, Alan & Marilyn Bergman	6:08
4	The Windmills Of Your Mind	Michel Legrand, Alan & Marilyn Bergman	5:10
5	I Will Wait For You	Michel Legrand, Norman Gimbel	4:09
6	In Another Life	Michel Legrand, Alan & Marilyn Bergman	3:45
7	Martina	Michel Legrand, Hal Shaper	2:39
8	Dis Moi	Michel Legrand, Françoise Sagan	2:44
9	You Must Believe In Spring	Michel Legrand, Alan & Marilyn Bergman	4:52
10	What Are You Doing The Rest Of Your Life?	Michel Legrand, Alan & Marilyn Bergman	5:37
11	How Do You Keep The Music Playing?	Michel Legrand, Alan & Marilyn Bergman	4:14
12	Something New In My Life	Michel Legrand, Alan & Marilyn Bergman	4:45
13	Maybe Someone Dreamed Us	Michel Legrand, Alan & Marilyn Bergman	4:14
14	Once Upon A Summer Time	Michel Legrand, Johnny Mercer	4:58
15	Celui-La	Michel Legrand/Eddy Mamay	2:54
