= Blake Morgan =

American musician and producer

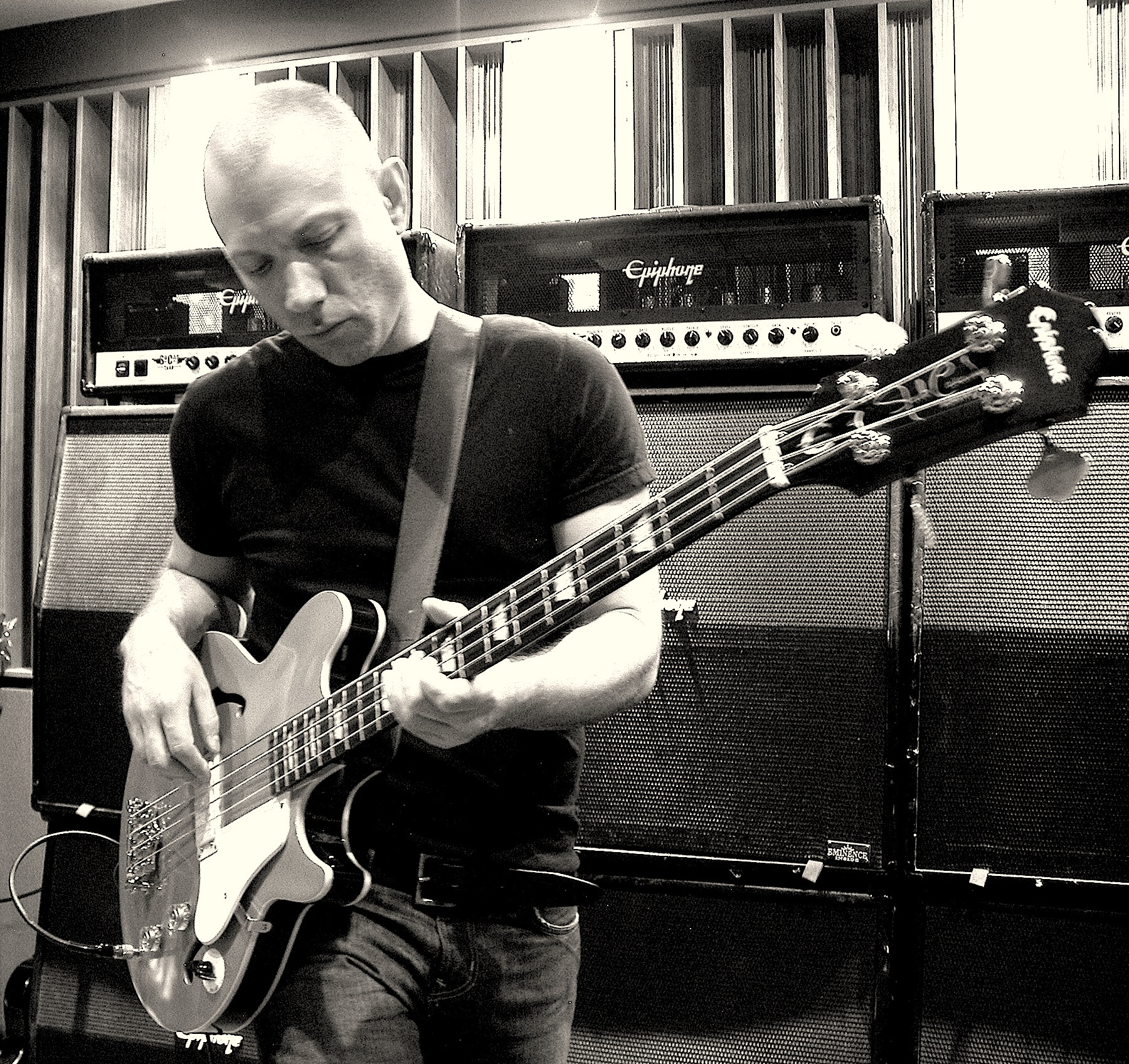

Background information
- Born: New York City, US
- Genres: Alternative rock, indie rock
- Occupations: Musician, singer, songwriter, producer, record label owner, activist
- Instruments: Vocals, piano, guitar, bass
- Years active: 1996–present
- Label: ECR Music Group
- Website: ecrmusicgroup.com/blakemorgan

Blake Morgan is an American musician, singer, music producer, record label owner, and activist based in New York City. After releasing the alternative rock solo album Anger's Candy (1997) on Phil Ramone's N2K Sony/Red label, he began producing music independently and founded the label Engine Company Records in 2002, which in 2012 became ECR Music Group. He helps record, produce, mix, and/or master all music released by the label, which has included artists such as James McCartney, Lesley Gore, Janita, Mike Errico, Patti Rothberg, David Cloyd, Terry Manning, Tracy Bonham, and Grace McLean, to name a few. His albums Anger's Candy, Burning Daylight, Silencer, Diamonds in the Dark, and Violent Delights were positively received.

== Early life ==
Morgan was born and raised in Manhattan. He is the son of American feminist activist and writer Robin Morgan and poet Kenneth Pitchford. He began playing the piano and going to music school at age five, with the aim of becoming a professional pianist. At age six his interest began to switch from classical composers such as Mozart and Bartók to The Beatles, after his mother introduced him to Meet The Beatles. In first grade he began attending the United Nations International School in New York City. He stayed there for 12 years, and graduated with an International Baccalaureate. He concurrently continued his piano studies at Greenwich House Music School in Manhattan.

Morgan's first gig was at CBGB's in New York, when older students from his school recruited him to play keyboards in their band. Since he was 13 years old and legally too young for the venue, they used his short stature to smuggle him inside the club in a bass drum case. As the show began, Morgan came out of the case to jump on stage and play the synths.

== Music career ==
After high school Morgan attended Berklee College of Music, where he completed a four-year program in three years and graduated magna cum laude. After college he began to play in various band formations and began pursuing music full-time, chiefly alternative rock. He has stated he has been influenced by musicians such as The Beatles, Led Zeppelin, Nirvana, Soundgarden, Radiohead, Björk, Jeff Buckley, Death Cab, Neil Finn, Peter Gabriel, and The Police. In 1996 he released the EP Sneakers.

=== Anger's Candy (1997) ===
He signed a seven-record deal with Phil Ramone's N2K Sony/Red label in 1996, and recorded a solo album at Compass Point Studios with Terry Manning, releasing Anger's Candy later in 1997. The ten tracks included Lenny Kravitz performing backup vocals on "Why Don't You See." The track "To Say It's Your Love" was co-written by Nandi Johannes. All other tracks were written by Morgan, and he performed vocals, acoustic and electric guitar, piano, and organ. Both Morgan and Terry Manning produced the album at Compass Point Studios in the Bahamas. He toured the United States in support of the album for over a year, sharing stages with musicians such as Joan Jett.

In response to the album, Billboard wrote "Morgan has a voice that was made to be heard on the radio . . . inspired songwriting and passionate performances." The New York Times wrote "Blake Morgan's singing and performances are disarmingly unselfconscious."

Morgan has stated he quickly became frustrated with being on a corporate label. After the tour was completed he found a loophole in the contract, and despite being the label's most successful artist at the time, he told Ramone he wanted out of the deal.

=== Engine Company Records, ECR Music Group ===
While producing Anger's Candy, he had started helping other local artists and bands produce projects on the side. These on-going projects, as well as frustration with A&R pitches from labels akin to N2K, led Morgan to consider creating his own independent label. He went to bands and artists he was recording at the time, and pitched a label where they would have control over their own material and output.

He launched Engine Company Records in New York City in 2002, and remains CEO and owner. It was re-branded as ECR Music Group in late 2012, expanding into an umbrella company that includes Engine Company Records as well as a roster of other labels and artists. ECR Music Group is distributed by The Orchard, and the label's associated publishing company is called ECR Music Publishing, in partnership with Sony Music Publishing. Similar to Rick Rubin's relationship with American Recordings, Morgan produces the music for the label. Genres have ranged from emo/punk, to alternative rock, to Classical. He has recorded in locations such as The Hit Factory in New York and Compass Point Studios in the Bahamas.

=== Burning Daylight (2005) ===
"Better Angels"
Sample of Morgan's 2005 track "Better Angels" off Burning Daylight, illustrating his acoustic style

His next solo album, Burning Daylight, was released on Engine Company Records on July 12, 2005. Co-produced with Grammy Award-winner Phil Nicolo, it reached #1 on eMusic's album charts, holding the number spot for both album, single ("Danger to Wake You"), and artist at the same time. The bonus track of his cover of Paul McCartney's "Maybe I'm Amazed" became the most successful track in the history of the label, and climbed high on iTunes charts.

The album received a positive review and 4/5 stars on Allmusic. The Washington Post wrote "He's got killer pop-rock instincts . . . a natural when it comes to fashioning sharp melodies and catchy choruses."

In 2006 his song "It's Gone," performed by Lesley Gore, was featured in the final scene and closing credits of the independent film Flannel Pajamas, by Jeff Lipsky. The film, which was lauded by Roger Ebert, was nominated for the Grand Jury Prize at the 2006 Sundance Film Festival. On March 18, 2009, the track "Better Angels" from the album was featured in MTV's The Real World: Brooklyn. The Lesley Gore version of "Better Angels" was also featured in the 2005 season premiere of CSI: Miami.

=== Silencer (2006) ===
On October 25, 2006, he released the album Silencer' It features Morgan on vocals and piano performing acoustic versions of both new and older material, dating back to 1996. A cover of "No Surprises" by Radiohead was also released as a digital bonus track. The album again received a positive review on AllMusic, which gave it a 3/5 stars and said "These are darkly heartfelt, enigmatic and melodic songs that often bring to mind a mix of the yearning, expansive rock of the Smashing Pumpkins and the soulful AM pop of Todd Rundgren. Meditative and sanguine, these are afterglow torch songs for the alt rock set." Blender wrote "Great songs and great singing is apparently all you need if you have the goods, and there are plenty of goods to be had here . . . with imaginative arrangements that underscore his raw, iconic singing."

=== Diamonds In The Dark (2013) ===
Silencer fueled the anticipation for Morgan's next album, Diamonds In The Dark, which was released on July 30, 2013 on ECR Music Group. The album garnered numerous rave reviews, and was described in the press as “…one of the finest albums of 2013. A must have." and "a killer piece of art." Morgan wrote the entire album, performing all the vocals, and the majority of the instruments, in addition to producing, recording, mixing and mastering it. In a Halfstack magazine interview he calls the title of the album symbolic, and explains that the songs are the diamonds that he had picked out of a difficult, dark period in his life. A unique aspect of the album is that the tracks are ordered almost identically to the order in which they were written. Diamonds in the Dark is a turning point for Morgan artistically, and the release of the album coincided with the beginning of Morgan's political activism on behalf of artists.

=== Violent Delights (2022) ===
On May 20th, 2022, Morgan issued his fifth full-length effort, the wide-ranging Violent Delights, which in an interview with SonicScoop, he likens to an amalgam of The Police's Ghost in the Machine and AC/DC's Back in Black. The title of the album refers to a line in Romeo And Juliet (“These violent delights have violent ends”), in Act 2, Scene 6 in which the young couple is warned that their passions may cost them. This album was Morgan's first record composed primarily of love songs, which The Aquarian praised: "Every one of his releases can be dubbed as confident, ardent, wise, melodic, groovy, uplifting, delicate, and witty. On Violent Delights, the musician's latest, predominantly hands-on artistic undertaking, fans are offered a chance to experience all of that and much more. Laced into these 10 tracks being put out into the world (timely as ever, if you ask us) is joy, hope, and harmony in every sense of the word." All Music Guide states that “Morgan's intelligent lyrics, and gift for pairing biting post-punk with AM pop and windows-down indie rock have earned him a loyal critical and commercial following.”

Once again, on Violent Delights, the multi-instrumentalist producer played every instrument himself except for the drum kit, which was played by Miles East.

=== Rockwood Music Hall Concert Series and Touring (2016-2022) ===
From September of 2016 to November of 2022, in the midst of his duties as a record-label owner, producer, and activist, Morgan enjoyed a record-breaking seven-year run of 30 sold-out concerts at New York City's Rockwood Music Hall. His bi-monthly concert series fueled a string of over 200 headlining performances around the globe across 150,000 miles of touring, selling out concerts across the United States, the United Kingdom, and continental Europe. Over its course, Morgan's Rockwood residency became a New York City word-of-mouth scene, regularly featuring Grammy and Tony Award-winning special guests who have joined him for unique on-stage collaborations, including Duncan Sheik, Tracy Bonham, Chris Barron, Jill Sobule, Michael Leonhart, David Poe, Josh Dion, and others.

== Activism ==
Morgan's political activism on behalf of artists began in May 2013, when a pointed email exchange between him and the founder of Pandora, Tim Westergren, regarding lowered royalties, was published in the Huffington Post. The article was met with much enthusiasm in the artist community, and Pandora lost $130 million in the stock market the following morning. This David vs. Goliath struggle for artists' rights ended in a whistle-blowing victory over the Internet radio giant, and led to the multibillion-dollar company abandoning its own signature legislation (IRFA = Internet Radio Fairness Act) in Washington. The legislation would have reduced artists' pay by up to 85%.

In mid-December 2013, following the defeat of IRFA, Mr. Morgan went on to write an Op-ed for the Huffington Post titled 'Art and Music Are Professions Worth Fighting For', which further galvanized the musician community. The idea for the next step in his artist advocacy–the campaign "I Respect Music"–was born in this very piece, which went viral and became Huffington Post's most-read music article of 2013. It closed with a simple message: “My New Year's resolution is to stand up more, and speak more. I respect my profession. I respect artists. I respect music.” A tweet from a young artist from the Philippines, named Joana Marie Lor, in response to Morgan's article, was the first to use the hashtag #IRespectMusic. This, in Morgan's words, was the “tweet that started it all.” He has also said: "Once the article went viral. . . it was clear that idea–and those three words–had resonated far more deeply than anyone could have expected."

=== #IRespectMusic - The campaign ===
Inspired by the over 40,000 "likes" that Blake Morgan received in December 2013 on his Huffington Post article, "Art and Music Are Professions Worth Fighting For," Morgan decided the time was right to launch a petition to Congress, I Respect Music, supporting a musician's right to receive pay for radio airplay. To boot off the campaign, Morgan wrote the words "#I Respect Music" on an index card and showed it to the world in a self-made video, which was posted on the I Respect Music-website in anticipation of the action. The petition was launched a week later on January 28 of 2014, and it went viral at an unprecedented pace. Everyday working musicians, music fans, music organizations, and luminaries like Patrick Stewart, Gavin DeGraw, Gloria Steinem, Aerosmith's Joe Perry, Jane Fonda, Jean-Michel Jarre, Marisa Tomei, Rosanne Cash, Mike Mills, John McCrea, Civil Twilight, Clap Your Hands Say Yeah, and countless others voiced their support by both signing the petition, and posting or tweeting a "selfie" with the hashtag: #IRespectMusic. Within thirty days the petition had received nearly 10,000 signatures.

The petition is based on the fact that the United States is the only democratic country in the world where artists don't get paid for radio airplay, and that the short list of countries that share the United States’ position on this issue includes Iran, North Korea, China, Vietnam, and Rwanda. As a result of not paying their artists for radio airplay in the United States, other democratic countries aren't paying American artists in their countries. The petition seeks legislation that would get artists paid for the work that they do, in sync with the rest of the democratic world.

=== Fair Play Fair Pay Act of 2015 ===
Morgan spent much of his time in 2014 and early 2015 in the offices of members of Congress, convincing them of the need for reform to protect musicians' rights. He came to see the fruit of his labors in April 2015 when Rep. Jerry Nadler (D-NY), Rep. Marsha Blackburn (R-TN), Rep. John Conyers (D-MI) and Rep. Ted Deutch (D-FL) introduced bipartisan legislation, titled the "Fair Play Fair Pay Act of 2015". This music bill would have ensured that all artists are fairly paid on digital and AM/FM radio.

In an interview for BroadwayWorld.com Morgan had this to say about the proposed legislation: "This Act would fundamentally change the lives of millions of hard working American music makers. It would reverse our country's century-old position on not paying artists when their work is played on the radio. It would restore digital royalty payments to music makers whose iconic work was released prior to 1972 (protecting many legacy artists who are now in their seventies and eighties), work that is constantly monetized by billion dollar corporations without any recompense to the artists who created that work. It would get music producers paid too. It guarantees a tech-neutral approach. It guarantees songwriters won't be penalized in the fight to get the artists who perform those songs paid as well. There's even more good in the bill than all that, but suffice it to say, it is a historic and long overdue move to reform the musical landscape for millions of Americans, and I couldn't support it more strongly."

=== NMPA Partners With The I Respect Music Campaign ===
On June 18, 2015 Billboard Magazine reported on The National Music Publishers Assn. new partnership with the I Respect Music campaign established to support passage of the Songwriters Equity Act, that was re-introduced to Congress earlier in 2015. The partnership was announced by NMPA CEO David Israelite, followed by a speech by Blake Morgan at the organization's annual meeting, held on June 17 of 2015 at the Marriott Marquis in Times Square. Says David Israelite: "To date, [I Respect Music] has mainly focused on artist and labels," but songwriters could benefit from being aligned with the movement.

Throughout 2014 and 2015 Morgan has spoken about the I Respect Music-campaign, the Fair Play Fair Pay Act, and other artists' rights issues on major media, from CNN and Fox News, to NPR and The New York Times. He was also a featured speaker at the Global Music Forum 2015 as part of Canadian Music Week, in Toronto, and numerous universities within the US.

== Discography ==
- Sneakers EP (1996)
- Anger's Candy (1997)
- Burning Daylight (2005)
- Silencer (2006)
- Diamonds in the Dark (2013)
- Violent Delights (2022)
