= Mike Errico =

American singer-songwriter

- Born: Michael Errico; New York City, United States
- Genres: Rock
- Occupations: Musician, composer, Producer, writer, editor, music supervisor
- Instruments: Vocals, Guitar, Keyboards, Bass, Tongue Drum
- Years active: 1997–present
- Labels: Tallboy 7
- Website: Mike Errico official site

Michael Errico is an American singer-songwriter, producer, author, professor, and journalist.

== Career ==
As a recording artist, Errico has toured internationally, playing music festivals (including Woodstock '99's emerging artist stage) and alongside artists including 2x GRAMMY-nominated Raul Midón (cowriter, "Next Time" ,) Bob Weir, Amos Lee, Derek Trucks, Jonatha Brooke, and Dan Wilson.

In 2022, he appeared in the "Lyin' Eyes" episode of the TV show Billions in the role of "Guitarist"

Since 2013, Errico has taught songwriting and music business at universities including Yale, Wesleyan, The New School, and NYU's Clive Davis Institute of Recorded Music, where he was nominated for the David Payne-Carter Award for Excellence in Teaching (2019). He also taught the 2022 Grammy Museum’s inaugural Summer Sessions in New York City.

In 2021, Errico published Music, Lyrics, and Life: A Field Guide for the Advancing Songwriter.

As a music journalist, Errico worked as Senior Online Editor for Blender magazine from 2006 to 2008, and his opinions and insights have appeared in publications including The New York Times, CNN, The Wall Street Journal, Fast Company, The UK Independent, and The Observer.

Errico has written TV theme songs including VH1's hit series Pop Up Video.

== Articles ==
George Saunders on His First Love: Songwriting
Touring Can’t Save Musicians in the Age of Spotify
Inside Fender's Plan to Rock the Guitar Industry With New Hits and Classics
What Pop Stars and Actual Stars Have in Common
Woodstock '99 line-up: Who is featured in Netflix docu-series?
ARTIST TO ARTIST: What Writer's Block Isn't...and What It Really Is"/
What the Brain Likes in a Song

== Bibliography ==
Music, Lyrics, and Life: A Field Guide for the Advancing Songwriter (2021)

== Discography ==
Minor Fits (2017)
Wander Away (2011)
Songs from Lift (2010)
All In (2007)
Skimming (2004)
Tonight I Drink You All (2001)
Pictures of the Big Vacation (1999)
Bite Size (1997)
