= ECR Music Group =

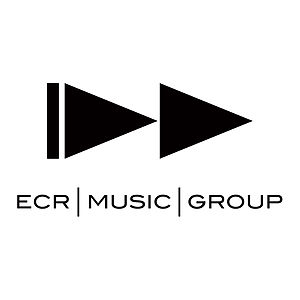
- Founded: 2002 (Rebranded in 2012)
- Founder: Blake Morgan
- Status: Active
- Distributor: The Orchard
- Genre: alternative rock, soul, emo/punk, classical, pop rock, adult contemporary
- Country of origin: United States
- Location: Manhattan, New York
- Official website: ECRMusicGroup.com

ECR Music Group is an American independent music company based in Manhattan. It was founded by recording artist and producer Blake Morgan in 2002 as record label Engine Company Records. Re-branded as ECR Music Group in late 2012, it now includes a roster of both imprints and artists, as well as an artist-services division, Meridian, and a publishing division, ECR Music Publishing. The label differs from its counterparts in its artist-friendly philosophy and partnership wherein all ECR artists and labels own 100% of their master recordings.

Artists on ECR Music Group have included Janita, James McCartney, Tracy Bonham, David Poe, Jill Sobule, Terry Manning, Blake Morgan, Lesley Gore, David Cloyd, Chris Barron, Grace McLean, and many others. Morgan produces the releases, and genres vary significantly.

ECR Music Group is distributed by The Orchard. As of 2024, imprints include the aforementioned Meridian, as well as Merrill Artists, Hook & Ladder Records, Lucky Seven Records, and the company's original catalog housed as Engine Company Records.

== History ==
Engine Company Records logo from 2011

ECR Music Group was founded as Engine Company Records in 2002 by singer-songwriter, producer, and activist Blake Morgan. In 1996 Morgan had signed a seven-record deal with Phil Ramone's N2K Sony/Red label. However, he quickly became frustrated being on a corporate label. After his first tour he found a loophole in the contract. Despite being the label's most successful artist at the time, he told Ramone he wanted out of the deal. Morgan then began going to bands and artists he was recording at the time, and pitched an independent label where they would have control over their own material and output. He officially launched Engine Company Records in Manhattan, New York City in 2002, and remains CEO and owner.

ECR Music Group announced the official launch date of its rebranding as October 4, 2012. According to the company's website, the company now consists of an "interconnected set of businesses singularly focused on helping its artists, songwriters, and imprints." Uniquely, ECR Music Group achieves these goals while operating under an elemental principle, unprecedented in the music world: all of its artists and labels own 100% of their master recordings.

Similar to Rick Rubin's relationship with American Recordings, Morgan produces most of the music for the label. Genres have ranged from emo/punk, to alternative rock, to country, to classical. Recordings have taken place in locations such as The Hit Factory in New York and Compass Point Studios in the Bahamas. Among artists and producers that have worked with the label are James McCartney, Lesley Gore, Janita, David Cloyd, Mike Errico, Patti Rothberg, David Kahne, and Phil "Butcher Bros." Nicolo, and Terry Manning. In a Sonicscoop interview Morgan singles out Terry Manning and Phil Nicolo as mentors. Morgan says: “One of the great things I’ve had in my career, that a lot of people have less and less of, is incredible mentors, who are giants in the recording world. Terry Manning and Phil Nicolo, these two guys have been incredible Obi-Wan Kenobis' for me."
