= Angelo D'Aleo =

American singer (born 1940)

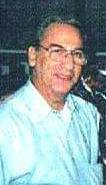
- D'Aleo in 2005

Background information
- Born: February 3, 1940 (age 86); The Bronx, New York, US
- Genre: Doo-wop
- Instrument: Vocals
- Years active: 1955–2018
- Formerly of: The Belmonts

Angelo D'Aleo (born February 3, 1940) is an American singer, best known for being a member of The Belmonts (later Dion and the Belmonts), singing first tenor vocals.

== Early life ==
D'Aleo was born to a family of Italian descent, and grew up in Belmont, Bronx, and was a member of the Imperial Hoods gang with Carlo Mastrangelo and Fred Milano.

== Career ==
In 1955, D'Aleo, Mastrangelo, and Milano formed The Belmonts, a vocal group. They signed with Mohawk records in 1957, and recorded their first single "Teenage Clementine"/"Santa Margherita", with D'Aleo on lead vocals on the B-side. They eventually added in lead singer Dion DiMucci, and the group became Dion and the Belmonts.

From around late 1958 to 1960, D'Aleo was inactive in the group as he was in the United States Navy. D'Aleo was flown out to attend a recording session, which included "A Teenager in Love", their first US top ten. According to D'Aleo, "I was in the Navy", I got a call from Fred (Milano). 'We've gotta finish up the album. You've gotta get over here'. So I got a flight and went in. One of the last songs we did was "A Teenager in Love". I listened and said, 'What? I hope this song doesn't go out as a single. It's a terrible song'. I hated the song. Later on, I'm heading to South America with the fleet and my friend in the radio shack said, 'Hey, get down here and listen to this!' It was "A Teenager in Love". In seven days, it became a hit!"

During the 1959 to 1960 period of the Belmonts, D'Aleo was not pictured in most advertisements for the group, despite the fact he still recorded on all their material, but still showed up to some gigs and television appearances "anytime I was in town", including one occasion in which he had just arrived from the airport, and sung in his uniform. Shortly before Dion left the Belmonts to go solo, D'Aleo was discharged from the Navy and rejoined the group full-time. D'Aleo spoke of Dion's departure, saying: "There was a reason why he left. Our reason was we wanted to stick to light rock 'n' roll and standards, and he wanted to get into the blues. He said, 'I want to do blues and country. I think it's time to go our separate ways'. We agreed."

By 1962, Frank Lydon was leading the Belmonts, and in 1966, Dion reunited with the group to record an album, Dion & The Belmonts. In 1968, D'Aleo and Milano composed the lyrics for a vocal version of the instrumental theme to the Mission:Impossible TV series, which was recorded by the Kane Triplets and released on United Artists Records.

D'Aleo left the Belmonts at some point around 1982, but returned over a decade later, "There was a time when I got mentally fatigued and tired. I actually left the group for four years. Maybe you want to call it 'burnt out.' Then Fred, my buddy, called me, and said, 'Ang-what are you doing? Come on.' I've been back ever since". Before rejoining, D'Aleo reunited with Mastrangelo and Dion for a concert, "Royalty of Rock: The Ultimate Reunion", on January 10, 1992, which also featured Ronnie Spector, Little Anthony and the Imperials, and several former members of the Drifters (Ben E. King, Charlie Thomas, Johnny Moore, and Barry Hobbs).

In 1989, Dion was inducted into the Rock and Roll Hall of Fame, but without the Belmonts. This same problem occurred with other groups such as the Miracles (Smokey Robinson), the Crickets (Buddy Holly), the Midnighters (Hank Ballard), the Famous Flames (James Brown), the Comets (Bill Haley) and the Blue Caps (Gene Vincent), and eventually, in 2012, the Hall of Fame inducted the members of the backing groups, however unusually, The Belmonts, who had been active around the same time as all of the other groups, were not, and still haven't as of 2026. According to Milano's obituary, "There was strife between DiMucci and Belmonts members, who were not pleased when DiMucci was inducted into the Rock and Roll Hall of Fame without them in 1989." In 2000, Dion and the Belmonts were inducted in the Vocal Group Hall of Fame.

D'Aleo remained with the group again until he retired in 2018, at which point he was the last original member still in the group.

== Personal life ==
With the deaths of Milano and Mastrangelo in 2012 and 2016 respectively, D'Aleo is the last surviving founding member of the Belmonts aside from Dion.

As of around 2006, D'Aleo still lived in New York.
