= Cigars, Acappella, Candy =

Studio album by the Belmonts
- Released: 1972
- Genre: Doo-wop, a cappella
- Label: Buddah
- Producer: Bob Feldman

The Belmonts chronology
Summer Love (1969)	Cigars, Acappella, Candy (1972)	Reunion: Live at Madison Square Garden 1972 (1973)

Cigars, Acappella, Candy is an album by the American singing group the Belmonts, release in 1972. To coincide with a doo-wop television special, Spike Lee & Company: Do It a Cappella, the album was rereleased by Elektra Records in 1990, at the same time as the Persuasions' Chirpin'.

== Production ==
The album was produced by Bob Feldman. "Street Corner Symphony" is a medley of 14 early pop, doo-wop, and rock and roll songs. The version of George Harrison's "My Sweet Lord", which includes a snippet of the Chiffons' "He's So Fine", employed kazoo and percussion.

== Critical reception ==
Professional ratings
Review scores
Source	Rating
AllMusic	3/5 stars
Robert Christgau	B+
The Encyclopedia of Popular Music	3/5 stars

The New York Times labeled Cigars, Acappella, Candy "more interesting" than the Dion and the Belmonts reunion album, and deemed "Street Corner Symphony" "a miracle of compression." Robert Christgau praised the album but expressed his preference for the Persuasions. Richard Price, in a Rolling Stone interview with Dion, similarly considered the album second only to the work of the Persuasions. The Chicago Tribune wrote that the Belmonts "handle the a cappella format well, producing a hefty sound with swooping falsetto, vibrant bass, and tight harmonies." The Commercial Appeal noted the "superb three-part harmonizing." The Buffalo Evening News determined that the Belmonts sing the songs "with style, a little flash and not too much pandering."

In December 1979, the music critics Ed Ward and Greil Marcus included the album on their Village Voice ballots for the 10 best albums of the 1970s. In 1992, The Rolling Stone Illustrated History of Rock & Roll called Cigars, Acappella, Candy "some of the most heartbreakingly beautiful doo-wop singing ever recorded." In 2010, Spin listed the album as one of eight "essential" doo-wop albums, writing that the Belmonts "sing music that still feels transmitted from space."

== Track listing ==
No.	Title	Length
1.	"That's My Desire"
2.	"Da Doo Ron Ron"
3.	"Loving You Is Sweeter Than Ever"
4.	"Where or When"
5.	"My Sweet Lord"
6.	"Rock and Roll Lullabye"
7.	"We Belong Together"
8.	"Na Na Hey Hey (Kiss Him Goodbye)"
9.	"Street Corner Symphony": a. "Sunday Kind of Love"; b. "Sincerely"; c. "In the Still of the Night"; d. "Darling Lorraine"; e. "Please Say You Want Me"; f. "Come Softly to Me"; g. "Come Go with Me"; h. "You Baby You"; i. "I Wonder Why"; j. "Gee"; k. "You Belong to Me"; l. "Teenager in Love"; m. "Little Girl of Mine"; n. "Little Darlin'"
