= Carlo Mastrangelo =

American doo-wop and progressive rock singer (1937–2016)

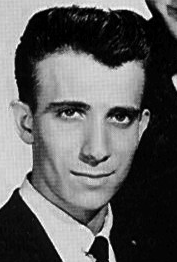
- Mastrangelo in 1960

Background information
- Born: October 5, 1937; The Bronx, New York City, U.S.
- Died: April 4, 2016 (aged 78) Boynton Beach, Florida, U.S.
- Genre: Doo-wop
- Instruments: Vocals, drums
- Years active: 1955–2016
- Formerly of: The Belmonts

Carlo Mastrangelo (October 5, 1937 – April 4, 2016) was an American doo-wop and progressive rock singer, and drummer.

He was an original member of the Belmonts (with and without Dion DiMucci), a popular singing group of the late 1950s and early 1960s. He also played drums before and after the Belmonts with several groups. He led the progressive rock/jazz ensemble, "Pulse", during the 1970s.

== Early life ==
Carlo Mastrangelo was born, and raised, in Belmont, Bronx, in 1937. He lived in an apartment on the corner of 179th St. and Mapes Ave.

== Career ==
=== The Belmonts: 1955–1962 ===
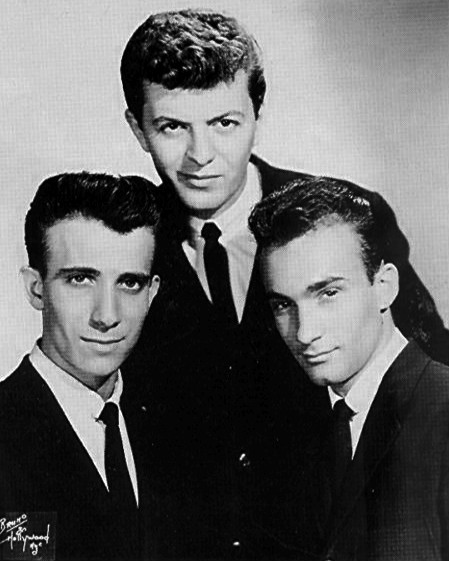
Mastrangelo (left) with Dion and the Belmonts in 1960

Mastrangelo formed The Belmonts in 1955 with Angelo D'Aleo and Fred Milano, who were all members of a Bronx gang called the Imperial Hoods. They began recording professionally in 1957, and not long after added Dion DiMucci as lead singer, and the groups name was changed to Dion and the Belmonts. Mastrangelo sang bass. They had hits including "A Teenager in Love" and "Where or When". In 1959, he filled in on drums for Buddy Holly's drummer Carl Bunch when Bunch got frostbite and had to quit the Winter Dance Party tour in 1959, playing with Holly, Ritchie Valens, and The Big Bopper.

After the group's breakup with DiMucci, he sang lead vocals on all Belmonts recordings until leaving for a solo career in 1962. Following the hit "Come On Little Angel", a split developed within the group concerning the finances of their privately owned label, Sabina (a.k.a. Sabrina) Records. Mastrangelo said, "Because we owned the company, we had to pay the bills, studio time, ads, and stuff like that. We needed hits that sold around 500,000 copies to make enough. That was the worst move we ever made. If we hadn't done that, we would have been together all these years. It was very sad, like leaving my two brothers". (Mastrangelo was replaced in the Belmonts by two musicians: Frank Lyndon joined on lead vocals, and shortly afterwards, guitarist Warren Gradus joined, doubling on Mastrangelo's original bass vocal parts.

=== Solo career as "Carlo": 1962–1964 ===
Mastrangelo left the group in 1962 and attempted a solo career on Laurie Records, releasing four singles under the name Carlo. He was backed vocally by the uncredited Tremonts (aka The Demilles). The singles "Baby Doll" and "Little Orphan Girl", received considerable airplay in Florida and a few other states, but didn't make the national charts. It was followed by an up-tempo rock 'n' roll version of the classic "Mairzy Doats", which was very different from the original. His final Laurie recording, "Stranger in My Arms", was written especially for him by hit maker Ernie Maresca ("The Wanderer", "Runaround Sue"). However, the flip, "Ring-A-Ling", a tune which he overdubbed catchy bass vocals to, was a favorite of New York disc jockey Murray the K. He featured it on his weekly "Record Review Board Contest", February 12, 1964, and it was the clear winner. It received airplay on New York stations WINS and WENE, but also failed to chart nationally. Around the same time, he contributed backing bass vocals to the Laurie single, "Donna Lee", by the Demilles, before joining DiMucci again.

=== Separate work with Dion, and Belmonts reunion: 1966–1967 ===
Between 1964 and 1966 Mastrangelo was Dion DiMucci's occasional songwriting partner, backup vocalist, and drummer in the group "Dion and the Wanderers", which also featured John Falbo on guitar and Pete Baron on bass. Recording for Columbia Records, they released four uncharted singles and made national appearances on Dick Clark's "Where The Action Is" and "The Lloyd Thaxton Show".

In late 1966, the three original Belmonts (Mastrangelo, Milano, and D'Aleo) reunited with DiMucci and released the album, "Dion & The Belmonts Together Again", for ABC Records. Produced by "DiMont Music", Mastrangelo played drums and DiMucci contributed guitar to reduce the need for additional session musicians. Two singles were released from the LP "My Girl The Month of May"/"Berimbau" and "Movin' Man"/"For Bobbie".

Neither charted in the United States, but fared better in England. During their brief reunion they appeared on the popular "Clay Cole Show" debuting "Berimbau" and "My Girl The Month of May", and occasionally performed at local New York City clubs such as "The Mardi Gras" on Staten Island (April 29, 1967) before disbanding.

=== The Endless Pulse and other bands, later career: 1967–1992 ===
In the late 1960s, Mastrangelo was lead vocalist for The Endless Pulse, recording three uncharted singles for Laurie Records. Subsequent releases included the bubblegum rock, Ernie Maresca produced, "Shoo-Fly Pie & Apple Pan Dowdy" on Tower Records, followed by a progressive version of the Peggy Lee classic "Fever" and "Let There Be Love" on the Raftis label. In the early 1970s, The Endless Pulse retooled itself as the jazz-rock ensemble Pulse, with Mastrangelo on lead vocals, drums, percussion, and kazoo. Other members included Kenny Sambolin, Richie Goggin, Bill Golden and Chris Gentile. In late 1971, they recorded the LP Pulse feat. Carlo Mastrangelo, later released in 1972 on the small Thimble label. Most of the material on the ten-track album was written by Mastrangelo, with an emphasis placed on organ and fuzz guitar. The LP is noted for being one of the few hard rock albums featuring a kazoo solo.

After Pulse disbanded, Mastrangelo formed and sang lead for The Midnite Sun, a popular New York City area nightclub band. Members included fellow ex-Pulse bassist Kenny Sambolin, lead guitarist Bobby Coleman, backup vocalist Judy Purse, and Mastrangelo's cousin Joey DeMaria on drums. Mastrangelo later replaced DeMaria on drums, with Charlie Carlisi replacing Coleman on lead guitar.

Mastrangelo, D'Aleo, Milano, and DiMucci reunited in New York City on June 2, 1972, for a Richard Nader "Rock and Roll Revival" concert. The live performance, recorded by Warner Brothers, was titled "Dion and The Belmonts – Reunion: Live at Madison Square Garden 1972". The following year, all four original members did another reunion concert at the Nassau Coliseum on Long Island, NY with no recording ever being issued.

Although no longer an official member of the Belmonts, Mastrangelo sang backing vocals on all nine tracks of the Belmonts' album "Cigars, Acappella, Candy", released by Buddah Records in 1972. He also sang lead vocals on the songs "Loving You Is Sweeter Than Ever" and "We Belong Together". The LP received many favorable reviews, being distinguished for its medley of 13 four-part harmony tracks titled "Street Corner Symphony". Their doo-wop version of "Da Doo Ron Ron", even received considerable airplay on progressive rock station WLIR.

Mastrangelo largely left music after 1972, but on January 10, 1992, reunited with Dion and D'Aleo for a concert, "Royalty of Rock: The Ultimate Reunion", which also featured Ronnie Spector, Little Anthony and the Imperials, and several former members of the Drifters (Ben E. King, Charlie Thomas, Johnny Moore, and Barry Hobbs).

In 1989, Dion was inducted into the Rock and Roll Hall of Fame, but without the Belmonts. This same problem occurred with other groups such as the Miracles (Smokey Robinson), the Crickets (Buddy Holly), the Midnighters (Hank Ballard), the Famous Flames (James Brown), the Comets (Bill Haley) and the Blue Caps (Gene Vincent), and eventually, in 2012, the Hall of Fame inducted the members of the backing groups, however unusually, The Belmonts, who had been active around the same time as all of the other groups, were not, and still haven't as of 2026. According to Milano's obituary, "There was strife between DiMucci and Belmonts members, who were not pleased when DiMucci was inducted into the Rock and Roll Hall of Fame without them in 1989." In 2000, Dion and the Belmonts were inducted in the Vocal Group Hall of Fame.

== Personal life ==
Mastrangelo lived in Boynton Beach, Florida, minutes away from Dion DiMucci. The two former lead singers of The Belmonts continued to collaborate on many of DiMucci's recordings and live performances from the 1980s until Mastrangelo's death in April 2016 at the age of 78.

== Discography ==
=== Solo ===
- Baby Doll / Write Me A Letter (1962)
- Little Orphan Girl / Mairzy Doats (1963)
- Five Minutes More / Story Of Love (1963)
- Ring-A-Ling / Stranger In My Arms (1964)
- Fever / Claudine (1970)
- Let There Be Love / same single as B-side (1970)

=== Dion and the Wanderers ===
- Tomorrow Won't Bring The Rain / You Move Me Babe (1965) - Dion and the Wanderers
- Time in My Heart For You / Wake Up Baby (1965) - Dion and the Wanderers
- Two Ton Feather / So Much Younger (1966) - Dion and the Wanderers
- I Can't Help But Wonder Where I'm Bound / Southern Train (1969) - Dion and the Wanderers

=== The Endless Pulse/Pulse ===
- "Time Is Wastin'" / "Ghost Man" (1968)
- "You Turned Me Over" / "Just You" (1968)
- "Nowhere Chick" / "Wake Me, Shake Me" (1969)
- Pulse featuring Carlo Mastrangelo (1972) - Thimble Records (Studio album)
- "Why Can't She See Me" / same single as B-side (1972)

=== Other releases ===
- "Rockin' Rocket" / "Happy Tune" (instrumentals) (1960) - Carlo and Jimmy
- "Donna Lee" / "Um Ba Pa" (1964) - The Demilles
- "Shoo-Fly Pie & Apple Pan Dowdy" / "It's Alright" (1969) - Carlo's Crown Jewel
