= Murray Kane =

- Born: Moses Simon Kaplan; May 26, 1915
- Died: January 31, 1986 (aged 70)
- Genres: Jazz, swing, big band
- Occupations: Vocalist, composer, arranger, U.S. Army Corporal
- Instrument: Vocals
- Formerly of: The Crew Chiefs, Glenn Miller Orchestra, The McGuire Sisters

Murray Kane (born Moses Simon Kaplan; May 26, 1915 – January 31, 1986) was an American Corporal, composer and band manager. As a performer, he was a member of the Crew Chiefs vocal group and the Glenn Miller Orchestra.

== Early life ==
Kane was born in 1915 in Brooklyn, New York. During high school, Kane hosted a radio show on WNEW alongside Hal Kanner.

== Career ==
=== Early career ===
Around 1937–38, after graduating from high school, Kane and Kanner recruited a female vocalist and performed under the names of "The Manhattanites" and "Two Bees and a Honey". The group was later joined by Daisy Brennier, and they performed with Fred Waring and His Pennsylvanians on the Chesterfield radio tour.

=== Glenn Miller Orchestra ===
During World War II, Kane was a member of Glenn Miller's Army Air Force Orchestra, performing with them overseas for the duration of the war.

=== The Crew Chiefs ===
Kane's military career originally saw him as a Private First Class officer in the US Army. In 1943, Kane formed The Crew Chiefs with Sergeant Steve Steck, Corporal Artie Malvin, and Privates Lynn Allison and Gene Steck. Around the same time, his rank was changed to that of Corporal. His despondency at this move led him to compose "Have Ya Got Any Gum, Chum?", quoting a popular phrase used between children and soldiers. Kane left the group in 1945.

=== Management career ===
After leaving The Crew Chiefs, Kane became a talent scout in New York City. He managed and composed for the DeMarco Sisters and secured them as a permanent fixture on Fred Allen's radio show.

In 1950, Kane became the vocal arranger for The McGuire Sisters, after hearing them perform on Kate Smith's radio show. Kane's compositions and arrangements helped the group secure an audition (and contract) at Decca Records. Kane subsequently became their personal manager, and helped arrange their breakthrough performance on Arthur Godfrey's Talent Scouts. The group retired in 1968. Through his work with The McGuire Sisters, Kane also worked with The Kane Triplets, who later performed on The Jack Benny Show, The Ed Sullivan Show, The Mike Douglas Show, The Perry Como Show and The Tonight Show. In 1984, Kane restarted The McGuire Sisters' career with a song entitled "The Second Time Around".

== Later life and death ==
Kane moved to Las Vegas in 1975. He died in Las Vegas on January 31, 1986, at the age of 70.
