= Fred Milano =

American singer (1939–2012)

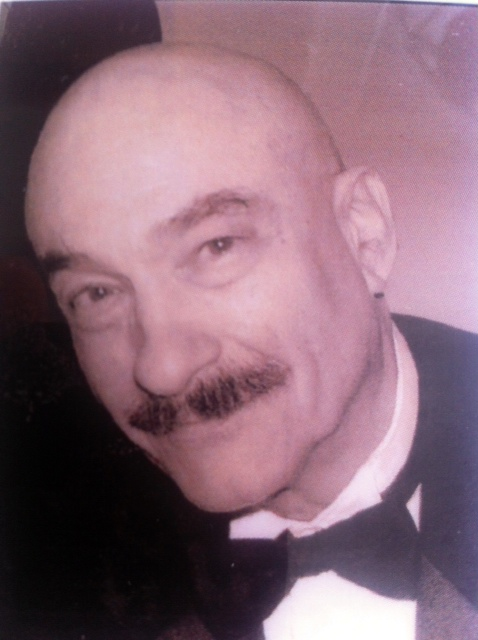
- Fred Milano

Background information
- Born: Fred Gradus Milano; August 26, 1939; The Bronx, New York City, New York, U.S.
- Died: January 1, 2012 (aged 72) Massapequa, Long Island, New York, U.S.
- Genre: Doo-wop
- Occupation: Singer
- Years active: 1955–2012
- Labels: EMI; Sony; RCA; Virgin; Hollywood
- Formerly of: The Belmonts

Fred Gradus Milano (August 26, 1939 – January 1, 2012) was an American doo-wop singer and paralegal. He was a member (second tenor) of The Belmonts who became successful in the late 1950s as Dion and the Belmonts, and in the early 1960s. Milano sang in the Belmonts from its formation until his death.

== Early life ==
Fred Gradus Milano was born into an Italian desceding family in Belmont, Bronx.

== Career ==
=== The Belmonts: 1955–2012 ===
Milano formed The Belmonts in 1955 with Angelo D'Aleo and Carlo Mastrangelo, who were all members of a Bronx gang called the Imperial Hoods. The Belmonts got their name from the street that Milano lived on, Belmont Avenue. D'Aleo sang first tenor, Milano sang second tenor, and Mastrangelo sang bass. They began recording professionally in 1957, and not long after added Dion DiMucci as lead singer, and the groups name was changed to Dion and the Belmonts. With Dion, the group had hits including "A Teenager in Love" and "Where or When", and after DiMucci left for a solo career in 1960, the group continued to produce hit records.

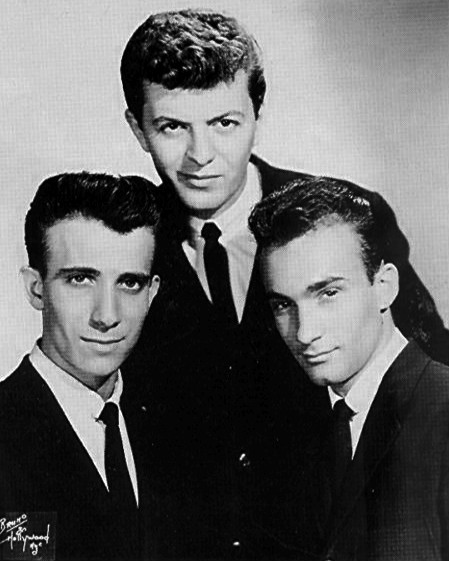
Milano (right) with Dion and the Belmonts in 1960

From the groups formation in 1955 until Milano's death, he had participated in every one of the Belmonts' recording sessions and appearance. However, due to an ongoing legal battle involving Milano, he did not take part in "Royalty of Rock: The Ultimate Reunion" with Dion, Mastrangelo, and D'Aleo, which was held on January 10, 1992.

In 1989, Dion was inducted into the Rock and Roll Hall of Fame, but without the Belmonts. This same problem occurred with other groups such as the Miracles (Smokey Robinson), the Crickets (Buddy Holly), the Midnighters (Hank Ballard), the Famous Flames (James Brown), the Comets (Bill Haley) and the Blue Caps (Gene Vincent), and eventually, in 2012, the Hall of Fame inducted the members of the backing groups, however unusually, The Belmonts, who had been active around the same time as all of the other groups, were not, and still haven't as of 2026. According to Milano's obituary, "There was strife between DiMucci and Belmonts members, who were not pleased when DiMucci was inducted into the Rock and Roll Hall of Fame without them in 1989." In 2000, Dion and the Belmonts were inducted in the Vocal Group Hall of Fame.

=== New York City Department of Corrections: 2003–2012 ===
In 2003, Milano joined the New York City Department of Corrections, while still performing with the Belmonts on the side, after having previously attended college and received his degree later in life. He worked as a paralegal at the Rikers Island jail complex, and had worked with jail law libraries since 2004.

== Death ==
Milano was still performing with The Belmonts at casinos and other venues when he was diagnosed with lung cancer in December, 2011 and died at a Long Island hospital three weeks later in Massapequa, New York on January 1, 2012. He was survived by his wife Lynn, two children, and 10 grandchildren.

Dion DiMucci said of his death; "I was shocked, obviously, because it was so sudden. It was already in stage four when he found out there was anything wrong with him. It hit hard because a relationship like we had, it’s ingrained in you. We knew each other from our teenage boyhoods; even though we weren’t close and didn’t talk in later years, what we went through together made us like family. He and the Belmonts — they were the very best. Freddie was almost like a genius with vocal harmony. I was humbled to sing with Freddie, Carlo and Angelo."

Karen Powell, director of law libraries for the department, said Milano: "had more energy than colleagues two decades younger and "was a person who really loved life."
