= Mario's =

Italian-American restaurant in New York City

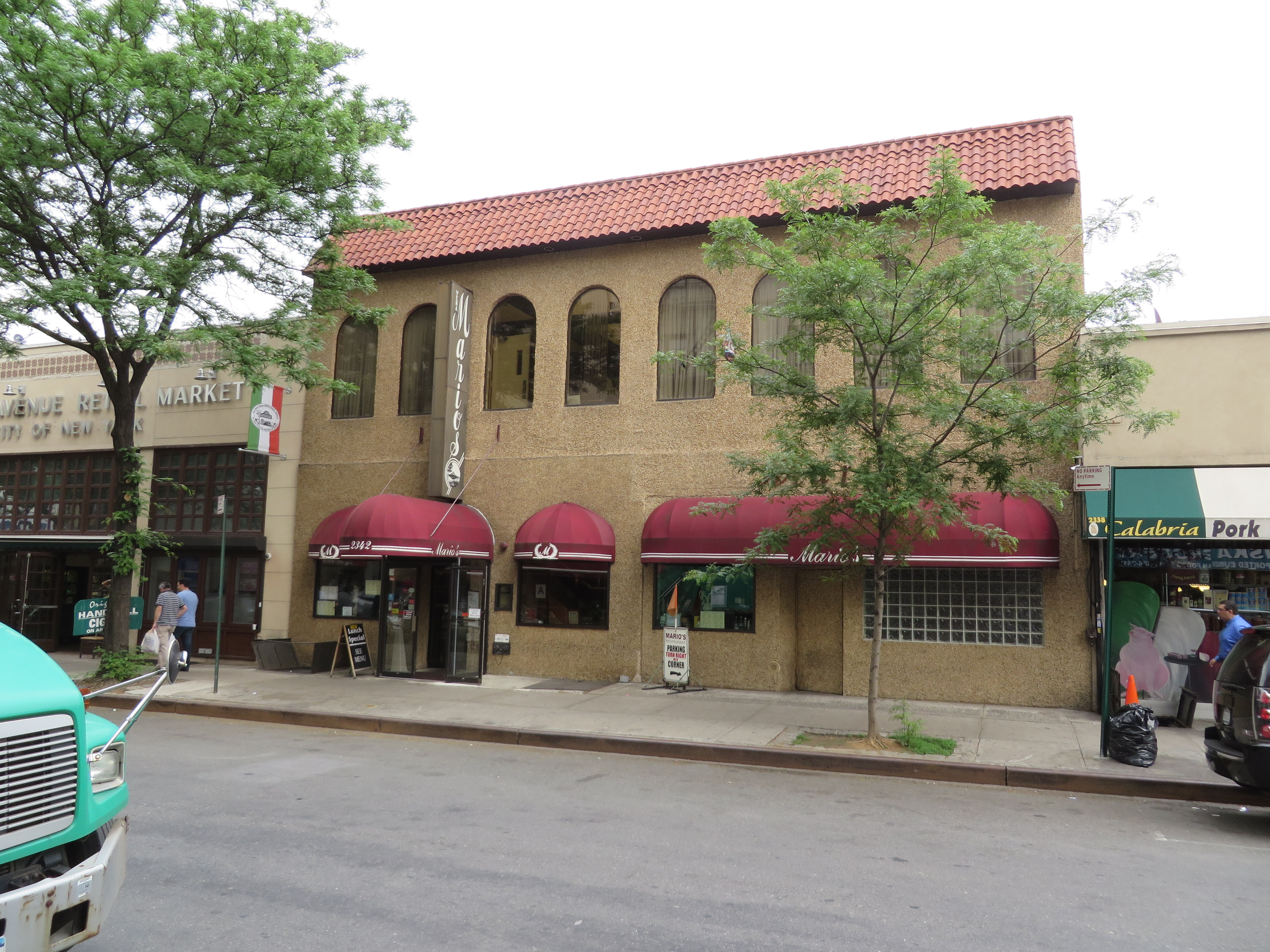
- Interactive map of Mario's

Restaurant information
- Established: 1919
- Location: 2342 Arthur Avenue, Bronx, New York, 10458, United States
- Coordinates: 40°51′15″N 73°53′18.5″W
- Website: mariosarthurave.org

Mario's is an Italian-American restaurant on Arthur Avenue in Belmont, Bronx. in 2000, the James Beard Foundation named it an America's Classic.

== History ==
The Miglucci family still runs the restaurant after first opening in 1919. In the 1930s, they expanded by becoming a full service restaurant serving Neapolitan‐style cuisine. Recipes featured in The New York Times included octopus salad, striped bass Marechiare, gnocchi di patate, and filetti di pomodoro (tomato and onion sauce).

Scolastica Migliucci and her son Giuseppe, Italian immigrants by way of Cairo, Egypt, opened a pizzeria in Lower Manhattan prior to establishing G. Migliucci Vera Pizzeria in the Bronx in 1919. At the outset, the restaurant had just 6 tables and sawdust on the floor. Another source says they opened on Harlem’s 114th Street in 1915. The restaurant expanded in the 1940s under the name Vera Mario’s Restaurant and Pizzeria, and again in 1980 to reach its current capacity of 120 seats in the main dining room.

The Arthur Avenue restaurant was run by brothers Mario and Clemente Migliucci, and subsequently by Mario's son, Joseph Migliucci. Joseph's daughter Regina Migliucci DelFino took over operations after his death in 2020.

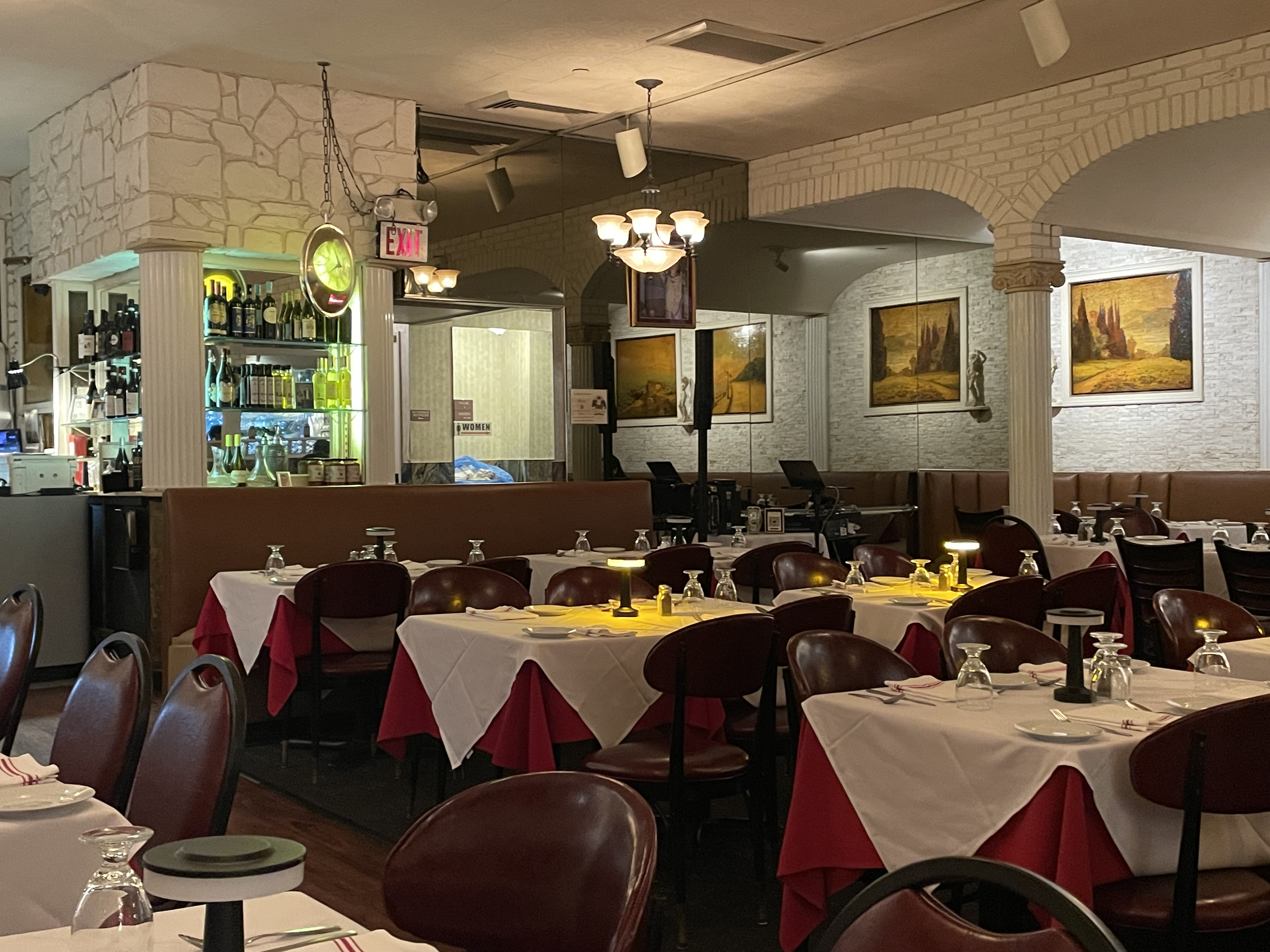
Mario's main dining room in 2026

== In popular culture ==
The Sopranos (season 4) filmed an episode here which was described by The Guardian as "more valuable than a Michelin star".
