= Bronx Beer Hall =

The Bronx Beer Hall is located inside in the Arthur Avenue Market in The Bronx where it opened in 2013 as part of a broader initiative to rebrand the borough.

Co-owners Paul and Anthony Ramirez serve a variety of Bronx themed beers, some of which are brewed in the borough.
