= The Crew Chiefs =

Background information
- Genres: Jazz, swing, big band
- Past members: Bill Conway; Murray Kane; Gene Steck; Steve Steck; Artie Malvin; Lynn Allison

The Crew Chiefs were a vocal group popular in the 1940s, known for accompanying Tex Beneke, Glenn Miller, and Ray McKinley. Member Artie Malvin co-wrote the song "I'm Headin' For California" with Glenn Miller in 1944.

== Appearances ==
The name of the group is an allusion to a crew chief in the U.S. Army Air Force. A Crew Chief is responsible for the day to day condition of the military aircraft assigned to them. The group appeared on the I Sustain the Wings radio broadcasts with Captain Glenn Miller and the Army Air Forces Training Command Orchestra. They also appeared on the V Discs released by the U.S. War Department. After the war, they were part of the Glenn Miller Orchestra under the direction of Tex Beneke.

Their appearances include:

- Glenn Miller and the Army Air Forces Training Command Orchestra (with Johnny Desmond) – "Moon Dreams" (1944)
- Glenn Miller Orchestra – "Have Ya Got Any Gum, Chum?" (1945)
- Glenn Miller Orchestra (with Ray McKinley) – "Chattanooga Choo-Choo" (1944)
- Glenn Miller Orchestra (with Johnny Desmond) – "The Trolley Song" (1945)
- Glenn Miller Orchestra – "It's Love-Love-Love" (1944)
- Glenn Miller Orchestra – "There Are Yanks" (1944)
- Glenn Miller Orchestra (with Tex Beneke) – "I'm Headin' For California" (1946)

== Members ==
The following singers all had tenure within the group:

- Bill Conway
- Murray Kane
- Gene Steck
- Steve Steck
- Artie Malvin
- Lynn Allison

== Sources ==
- Butcher, Geoffrey (1997). Next to a Letter from Home.
- Polic, Edward F. (1989). The Glenn Miller Army Air Force Band: Sustineo Alas 2.
- Simon, George Thomas. (1974). Glenn Miller and His Orchestra.
