= The Belmonts =

American doo-wop group

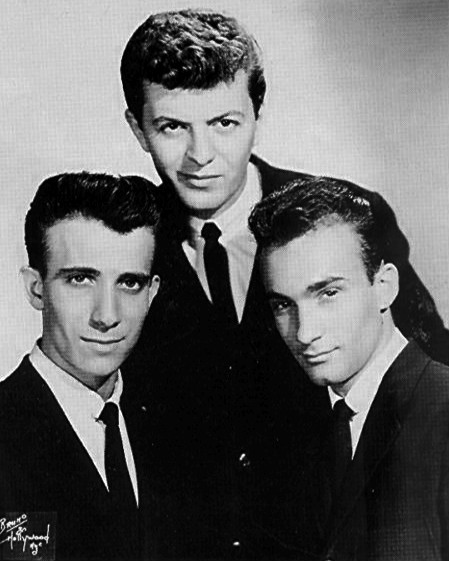
- Dion and the Belmonts in 1960. (L-R) Carlo Mastrangelo, Dion DiMucci & Fred Milano. (Angelo D'Aleo not shown as he was serving in the U.S. Armed Forces when this photo was taken.)

Background information
- Also known as: Dion and the Belmonts (1957-1960, 1966-1967, 1972, 1973, 1992)
- Origin: The Bronx, New York City, New York, U.S.
- Genre: Doo-wop
- Years active: 1955–2023
- Label: Laurie
- Past members: Carlo Mastrangelo; Fred Milano; Angelo D'Aleo; Dion DiMucci; Warren Gradus; Frank Lyndon; Dan Elliott; Al Loria; Bob Coleman

The Belmonts were an American doo-wop group from the Bronx, New York, that originated in the mid-1950s. The original group consisted of Angelo D'Aleo (born February 3, 1940), Carlo Mastrangelo (October 5, 1937 – April 4, 2016), and Fred Milano (August 26, 1939 – January 1, 2012). They took their name from Belmont Avenue, the Bronx street in which Mastrangelo lived, known as the Little Italy of the Bronx. From 1957 to 1960, Dion DiMucci (born July 18, 1939) served as lead vocalist, during which the group was billed as Dion and the Belmonts. At this time Mastrangelo sang the bass parts, Milano the second tenor, D'Aleo the falsetto (first tenor), and DiMucci did lead vocals. During this period, the group released four studio albums and one live album, charting numerous songs on the Billboard Hot 100. The group briefly had limited success after DiMucci's departure, charting several moderate and minor hits during the early 1960s with Mastrangelo on lead vocals. Mastrangelo was replaced in 1962 by Frank Lyndon and Warren Gradus, but the original group reunited in 1966, and thereafter performed together in numerous reunions over the years. They occasionally recorded new singles into the 1980s and performed live into the 21st century. Gradus continued performing live under the moniker until his death in October 2023.

== Career ==
=== Origins and work with DiMucci (1955–1960) ===
The name the Belmonts was derived from Belmont Avenue in the Bronx; two of the four singers having lived on Belmont Avenue, while the other two lived nearby. Carlo Mastrangelo, Angelo D'Aleo, and Fred Milano were part of a gang called the Imperial Hoods. Later addition DiMucci was part of another gang called the Fordham Baldies.

The Belmonts' first single, "Teenage Clementine"/"Santa Margherita", was recorded in 1957 for arranger Irving Spice's New York based Mohawk Records. Unlike subsequent recordings, Milano did the lead vocal on the "A" side, "Teenage Clementine", and D'Aleo sang lead on "Santa Margherita". Also recording on the label was Dion DiMucci, whose first release was backed by a group he never met, the Timberlanes. DiMucci added the lead vocal to existing pre-recorded tracks, and the final composition was released as "The Chosen Few"/"Out In Colorado", by "Dion and the Timberlanes" (Mohawk 105). After receiving some airplay on the East Coast, the single was later leased to the larger Jubilee Records label for better distribution, although it failed to chart nationally. DiMucci states that he never knew then, or now, who the Timberlanes were: "The vocal group was so white bread, I went back to my neighborhood and I recruited a bunch of guys, three guys, and we called ourselves Dion and the Belmonts."

Initially billed as "Dion with the Belmonts", the new group recorded "We Went Away"/"Tag Along" on the Mohawk label before leaving for newly formed Laurie Records in early 1958. Known thereafter as "Dion and the Belmonts", their first Laurie release, "I Wonder Why" (Laurie Records first release, Laurie 3013), was recorded at New York's Bell Sound Studios and brought them immediate success. Released the first week of May 1958, it appeared on the national charts two weeks later, rising to number 22 on the Billboard Hot 100. It led to their first appearance on the nationally televised American Bandstand, hosted by Dick Clark. The group followed with the ballads "No One Knows" (Laurie 3015, number 19) and "Don't Pity Me" (Laurie 3021, number 40), which were also performed on Bandstand.

Dion said of the Belmonts:

"I'd give 'em sounds. I'd give 'em parts and stuff. That's what 'I Wonder Why' was about. We kind of invented this percussive rhythmic sound. If you listen to that song, everybody was doing something different. It was totally amazing. When I listen to it today, often times I think, 'Man, those kids are talented'."

Dion and the Belmonts were the sound of the city.

Their roots were doo-wop groups like the Flamingos, the Five Satins and the Dells, acts who developed their sound in urban settings on street corners, mimicking instruments with their voices and even complex jazz arrangements.

They followed the hit with the ballads "No One Knows" (No. 19) and "Don't Pity Me" (No. 40), which they also performed on Bandstand. This early success brought them their first major tour in late 1958, with the Coasters, Buddy Holly and Bobby Darin, followed by the historic and tragic Winter Dance Party tour featuring Holly, Ritchie Valens and the Big Bopper. During at least one concert during the tour, photographs showed Holly filling in on drums for The Belmonts, whose drummer had frostbite. Being a skilled drummer already, Carlo Mastrangelo filled in on drums for several of the other acts, evidenced by photographs also. On February 2, 1959, after playing the Surf Ballroom, Holly arranged to charter a plane that could only take Holly and two of the other headliners. Holly decided it would be chosen by a coin toss. It was "the Big Bopper" J. P. Richardson who won the first coin toss and it was Dion who won the second coin toss. Dion believed the $36 cost to fly to the next venue was too much for such a short plane ride and declined. DiMucci's seat was given to Valens, who was sick with the flu and present in the dressing room where they all met with Holly to toss the coins. According to Dion, $36 was the price his parents paid for monthly rent. Shortly after midnight, on February 3, 1959, the plane crashed near Clear Lake, Iowa. Holly, Valens, The Big Bopper, and the pilot Roger Peterson were all killed. Bobby Vee, then an unknown artist, performed in Holly's place at the next concert. Later, Jimmy Clanton, Frankie Avalon, and Fabian were hired to finish the tour in place of the three deceased headliners. As of January 11, 2017, with the death of Holly's tour guitarist Tommy Allsup, DiMucci is the lone surviving member of the original Winter Dance Party lineup. (DiMucci's lone surviving Belmont bandmate, Angelo D'Aleo, was not on the tour, as he was in the US Navy at the time.)

In March 1959, Dion and the Belmonts' next single, "A Teenager in Love", became their first release to reach the top ten, peaking at No. 5 on the Billboard Hot 100 and No. 28 on the UK Singles Chart. Written by Doc Pomus and Mort Shuman, it's considered one of the greatest songs in rock and roll history.

D'Aleo went to great efforts to contribute his famous falsetto to the song. "I was in the Navy", the singer recalls. "I got a call from Fred. 'We've gotta finish up the album. You've gotta get over here'. So I got a flight and went in. One of the last songs we did was "A Teenager in Love". I listened and said, 'What? I hope this song doesn't go out as a single. It's a terrible song'. I hated the song. Later on, I'm heading to South America with the fleet and my friend in the radio shack said, 'Hey, get down here and listen to this!' It was "A Teenager in Love". In seven days, it became a hit!". Their appearance on "American Bandstand" was without D'Aleo, however, who returned to duty with the navy. At various times the group performed without him. During one national TV appearance on Clark's Saturday night program ("Live from the little theater on 44th Street in Manhattan"), he was filmed in his navy uniform, arriving just in time for the filming session. There were several picture sleeves from this era that did not picture D'Aleo, although he performed on all recordings. "A Teenager in Love" was followed by their first album, Presenting Dion and the Belmonts. Their biggest hit, "Where or When", was released in November 1959, and reached No. 3 on the Billboard Hot 100 with the group making another national appearance on American Bandstand. Although publicity photos show the group as a trio without Angelo D'Aleo, he performed on all of their recorded material; these photos were presented for promotional reasons owing to his departure to serve in the U.S. Navy. After their top-ten success with "A Teenager in Love", Dion and the Belmonts recorded four more singles. By the time of their breakup, all eight Laurie releases charted Billboard. Every "A" side made the top 40, except "Every Little Thing I Do" (Laurie 3035), which made the top 50. Their biggest hit and largest-selling record, "Where or When" (Laurie 3044), climbed to number 3 on the Billboard charts in early 1960. The "B" side, "That's My Desire", highlighted D'Aleo's soaring falsetto. It also received considerable airplay, especially in the New York City area. This time their appearance on American Bandstand once again featured all four members. Other singles released for the group that year continued to chart on Billboard, but were less successful. In early 1960, Dion checked into a hospital for heroin addiction, a problem he had since his mid-teens. At the height of the group's success his drug dependency worsened. When "Where or When" had peaked on the charts, he was in a hospital detoxing.

According to Vermillion County First, "[b]y August of 1960, Dion [DiMucci] was making plans to forge ahead with a solo career..."

=== DiMucci's departure and singles success (1960–1971) ===
Due to financial and musical differences between DiMucci, the Belmonts, and Laurie Records, Dion decided to leave the group in October 1960. "They wanted to get into their harmony thing, and I wanted to rock and roll," said Dion. "The label wanted me doing standards. I got bored with it quickly. I said, 'I can't do this. I gotta play my guitar'. So we split up and I did 'Runaround Sue', 'The Wanderer' and 'Ruby Baby'". In 1961, DiMucci said: “I'd like it understood right from the beginning that our split up was mutual. I didn't leave the Belmonts, nor did they leave me! Freddie, Carlo and Angelo are my closest friends. We've been together a long time. We've shared hard work and defeats as well as success. And each chipped in and done our share — gladly!” D'Aleo later recalled: "The breakup? I loved that guy. But there was a reason why he left. Our reason was we wanted to stick to light rock 'n' roll and standards, and he wanted to get into the blues. He said, 'I want to do blues and country. I think it's time to go our separate ways'. We agreed. There was no shouting or anything like that. We had 'Tell Me Why'. Dion had 'Runaround Sue' and 'The Wanderer'. He took off. Not the route he wanted, though. He loved the blues. But when you put out a single and people buy it, they're telling you what they want you to sing."

Simply known as Dion, DiMucci's first major solo hit, "Lonely Teenager", featured him backed by a female chorus. He eventually chose to work with the Del-Satins, who backed him (uncredited) on all his early Laurie and Columbia Records hits, which, besides the three aforementioned hits Dion quoted, also included "Donna the Prima Donna" ,"Drip Drop", "Lovers Who Wander", and "Little Diane". (DiMucci had 20 top 40 hits in the three years after leaving the Belmonts.) Later reissues of these songs would often be erroneously attributed to Dion and the Belmonts.

Including Billboard Hot 100 singles, Dion and the Belmonts charted 856 radio station surveys across the United States during the 1950s and 1960s. In 2000, the group was inducted into the Vocal Group Hall of Fame. Dion (without The Belmonts) was inducted into the Rock and Roll Hall of Fame in 1989.

Now a trio, they continued as "The Belmonts", with Mastrangelo singing lead. They continued to release records on their own label, Sabina Records, but with less success. In January 1961, before leaving the Laurie label, they released their own rendition of "We Belong Together" (Laurie 3080) covering the Robert and Johnny classic. The song bubbled under the Billboard Hot 100, charting at number 108. Although not a hit, it is still valued today by record collectors. Several of their post-Dion singles all received significant radio play in the New York City area. After leaving Laurie Records, The Belmonts continued to record throughout the 1960s on the Sabina, United Artists and Dot labels. The trio had six songs on the US Top 100 between 1961 and 1963. Their greatest, "Tell Me Why", released in May 1961 on the Sabrina (aka Sabina) label, reached #18 in the US and #14 in Canada. Subsequent Billboard-charted songs included "Don't Get Around Much Anymore" (number 57), "I Need Someone" (number 75), "Come On Little Angel" (number 28 / number 33 CAN), "Diddle-Dee-Dum" (number 53) and "Ann-Marie" (number 86). While not charting nationally, other singles receiving airplay included, "Such A Long Way" (4 surveys), "I Confess" (4), "More Important Things To Do" (3), "Hombre" (2), "Ac-Cent-Tchu-Ate The Positive" (2), "Walk On Boy" (1), "Let's Call It A Day" (1), and the medley: "Have You Heard/The Worst That Could Happen" (1). The song "C'mon Everybody (Do You Wanna Dance)" received enough airplay on NYC radio station WINS that it was re-recorded and used as the sound-bite introduction for deejay Murray the K's "Triple Play" segments. Overall, including Billboard Hot 100 singles, The Belmonts charted 518 radio station surveys across the US during the 1960s. The group's rare and highly collectible album from this period, The Belmonts: Carnival of Hits, was released on October 1, 1962, and consisted solely of their Sabina recordings. These songs have often been reissued in combination with other "Dion and the Belmonts" recordings through the years.

After the hit "Come On Little Angel", a split developed within the group concerning the finances of their privately owned label, Sabina Records. Mastrangelo said, "That was the worst move we ever made. If we didn't do that, we would have been together all these years. It was very sad, like leaving my two brothers." He was replaced by Frank Lyndon on lead and Warren Gradus doing Carlo's vocal parts and playing guitar. Mastrangelo attempted a solo career on Laurie Records, releasing four singles under the name "Carlo". He was backed vocally by the uncredited Tremonts (aka The Demilles). His first single, "Baby Doll", received considerable airplay in Florida, Pennsylvania and Connecticut, but didn't make the national charts. It was followed by an up-tempo rock 'n' roll version of the classic "Mairzy Doats", which was very different from the original. His final Laurie recording, "Stranger in My Arms", was written especially for him by hit maker Ernie Maresca ("The Wanderer", "Runaround Sue"). However, the flip, "Ring-A-Ling", was a favorite of New York disc jockey Murray Kaufman, aka "Murray the K". He featured it on his weekly "Record Review Board Contest" and it clearly won as the best new release. It received airplay on New York radio stations WINS and WENE, but also failed to chart nationally. After leaving Laurie Records, Mastrangelo became DiMucci's occasional songwriting partner, backup vocalist and drummer in the group "Dion and the Wanderers", which also featured John Falbo on guitar and Pete Baron on bass. Between 1964 and 1966 they released three uncharted singles for Columbia Records, making national appearances on Dick Clark's Where The Action Is and The Lloyd Thaxton Show.

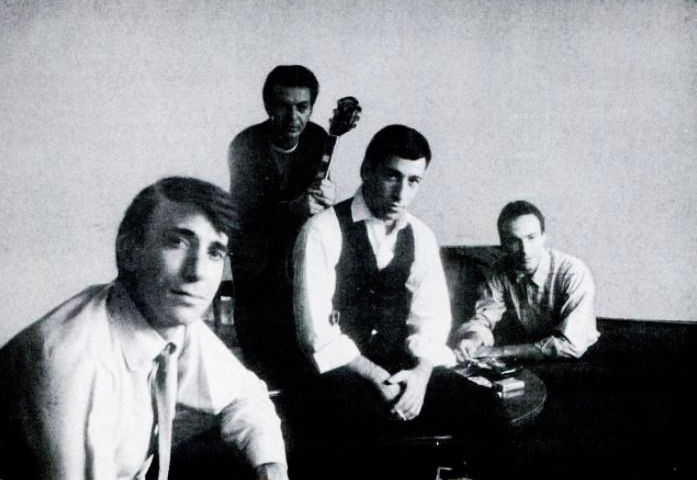
The group in 1966

In late 1966 the three original Belmonts - Mastrangelo, Milano and D'Aleo - reunited with DiMucci and recorded the album Dion & The Belmonts: Together Again, for ABC Records. Produced by "DiMont Music", Mastrangelo played drums and DiMucci contributed guitar to reduce the need for additional session musicians. Two singles were released from the LP, "My Girl The Month of May" / "Berimbau" and "Movin' Man" / "For Bobbie". Neither charted in the United States but fared better in England.

"My Girl The Month Of May" broke the "Radio London Fab 40" top ten at number 9 the week of December 25, 1966. One reviewer stated, "Some British radio DJ's gave it a lot of airplay at the time." The follow-up, "Movin Man", reached number 17 on the Radio London charts on March 26, 1967. "My Girl The Month Of May", was later covered by English artists Alan Bown in 1967 and The Bunch (featuring Sandy Denny of Fairport Convention) in April 1972. During their brief mid-'60s reunion, Dion and the Belmonts appeared on The Clay Cole Show performing "Berimbau" and "My Girl The Month of May" and occasionally performed at local New York City nightclubs, such as "The Mardi Gras," on Staten Island (April 29, 1967), before disbanding. After DiMucci left the Belmonts, Frank Lyndon returned. Lyndon continued as lead singer for the next five years. When Lyndon left, the lineup became a trio of Milano, D'Aleo, and Gradus. In 1968, D'Aleo and Milano composed the lyrics for a vocal version of the instrumental theme to the Mission:Impossible TV series, which was recorded by the Kane Triplets and released on United Artists Records.

Also in 1968, as a solo performer, Dion recorded "Abraham, Martin and John", written by Dick Holler. It is a tribute to social change icons Abraham Lincoln, Martin Luther King Jr., John F. Kennedy and Robert F. Kennedy. It was written as a response to the assassination of King in April and the assassination of Robert in June. When producer Phil Gernhard initially presented the song to DiMucci, the latter did not care for it. With the persistence of Gernhard, and Dion's wife Susan, he flew to New York that summer. He recorded the song in just one take. Laurie Records released the single in September of that year and it quickly raced up the chart, peaking at number four in December. DiMucci, now a star again, was invited to sing this comeback hit on The Smothers Brothers Comedy Hour, as well as many other top shows.

=== Reunions (1972–1989) ===
Mastrangelo, D'Aleo, Milano, DiMucci, and Gradus reunited on June 2, 1972, at the Felt Forum (inside Madison Square Garden) in New York City, for one of Richard Nader's "Rock and Roll Revival" concert. Nader said, "From our very first rock ‘n’ roll revival I must have received 100, 200, 300 letters at every single show asking, ‘Can’t you get Dion and the Belmonts back together?’ It took three years, but in 1972 we got both Dion and the Belmonts to say 'yes'." With only one brief rehearsal behind them, the eagerness with which the audience awaited their arrival on stage could be gauged from both Nader’s ecstatic introduction and the booming audience reaction that greeted it. Singer Billy Vera recalled the moment: "It was like an earthquake; you could literally feel the stage shake." The live performance was released as an album by Warner Brothers titled Dion and The Belmonts – Reunion: Live at Madison Square Garden 1972. The following year all four original members reunited once again (without Gradus), doing a sold-out concert at the Nassau Coliseum on Long Island, New York. No recording of the 1973 reunion was ever produced, nor were there any studio recordings made with the Belmonts and Dion, as DiMucci was still contracted to Warner as a solo artist.

In 1972, the Belmonts (then composed of Milano, D'Aleo, Gradus, and friends) also recorded an a cappella album, Cigars, Acappella, Candy, for Buddah Records. It was distinguished for its medley of 13 doo-wop tracks called "Street Corner Symphony". Mastrangelo and Lyndon, their two former lead singers from the 1960s, contributed backing vocals. Mastrangelo also sang lead vocals on the songs, "Loving You Is Sweeter Than Ever" and "We Belong Together". Concurrently, Mastrangelo released a progressive jazz-rock album on Thimble Records titled Pulse... featuring Carlo Mastrangelo. It received a small amount of airplay on New York rock stations WPLJ and WLIR, but overall was unsuccessful. In 1974, the group added Dan Elliott (née Rubado, ex-The Monterays, Glenn Miller Orchestra). In 1975, the Belmonts (Milano, D'Aleo, Gradus and Elliott) released one single on Laurie, followed by the album Cheek to Cheek for Strawberry Records. Gradus and Elliott also moonlighted on Laurie Records in the late 1970s under the alias Foreign Intrigue, releasing three singles. In 1981 the Belmonts (Milano, D'Aleo, Gradus and Elliott) recorded a single with Freddy Cannon titled, "Let's Put the Fun Back in Rock and Roll", for MiaSound Records. The song charted for four weeks, peaking at number 81 on the Billboard Hot 100.

With their newly charted record, The Belmonts and Cannon appeared on Solid Gold and The Mike Douglas Show to promote the single. Later that year, The Belmonts and Cannon joined forces in New York with Bo Diddley on guitar. Together they recorded the track "Shake It Sally", released in 1982 on the Rock 'n Roll Traveling Show album (Downtown D-20001). They also had a musical role in H. B. Halicki's 1982 movie The Junkman. In the mid-'80s, DiMucci also recorded with a group, consisting of Mastrangelo, Louis Colletti, and Tommy Moran. Colletti and Moran were backing vocalists on DiMucci's 1992 album Dream On Fire. Meanwhile, D'Aleo temporarily left the Belmonts, leaving the trio of Milano, Gradus, and Elliott. D'Aleo said, "There was a time when I got mentally fatigued and tired. I actually left the group for four years. Maybe you want to call it 'burnt out.' Then Fred, my buddy, called me, and said, 'Ang-what are you doing? Come on.' I've been back ever since". Art Loria also rejoined the group joined for singing duties in the mid- to late '80s. Loria, Milano and Gradus were involved in projects and recordings such as performing under the moniker "Happy Daze" in the 1960s and 1970s. Loria was later active in The Del-Satins, The Jive Five, Larry Chance and the Earls, and The Doo Wop All Stars; he died on October 23, 2010.

In 1988, the Belmonts released a Christmas album titled The Season Of Harmony; it was re-released on a different label in 1990 as "The Belmonts Acappella Christmas", with songs written by George David Weiss. They later appeared with Weiss on The Joe Franklin Show to promote it.

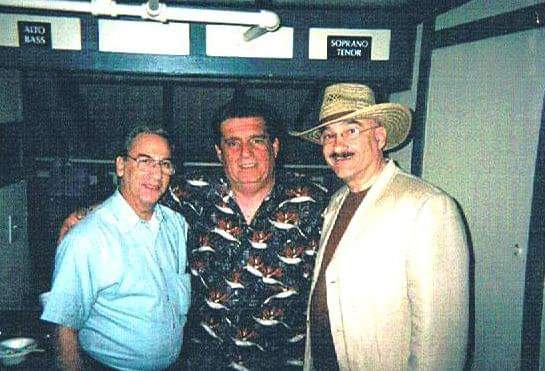
The Belmonts – backstage at concert in New Jersey, 2005 – The Belmonts – backstage at concert in New Jersey, 2005 (L-R) Angelo D`Aleo, Artie Loria, Fred Milano

DiMucci was inducted into the Rock and Roll Hall of Fame in 1989. The other original members of the Belmonts (Mastrangelo, Milano and D'Aleo) were not inducted, and as of 2023, have yet to be.

=== Lawsuit and Anthology (1991–2011) ===
In the early 1990s, a lawsuit was filed by Fred Milano and Warren Gradus claiming trademark infringement against DiMucci, Mastrangelo, and D'Aleo. In May 1991, Milano and DiMucci entered into an agreement in which DiMucci agreed to appear with Milano and others, performing concerts under the name Dion and the Belmonts, but only if certain conditions were met. Milano claimed he negotiated arrangements for as many as five concerts, but DiMucci refused to honor the agreement. The suit alleged that while DiMucci had agreed to reunite with Milano, he had also simultaneously agreed to take part in a reunion with Mastrangelo and D'Aleo. Milano and Gradus won the lawsuit, with Milano being awarded the rights to the Belmonts' name.

On January 10, 1992, DiMucci reunited with Mastrangelo and D'Aleo, with Milano not being included due to the ongoing legal challenges, as part of a concert called "Royalty of Rock: The Ultimate Reunion," alongside Ronnie Spector, Little Anthony and the Imperials, and several former members of the Drifters (Ben E. King, Charlie Thomas, Johnny Moore, and Barry Hobbs).

In 2000, Dion and the Belmonts were inducted in the Vocal Group Hall of Fame.

In 2003, The Belmonts created an internet radio station called "The Belmonts Internet Radio" playing all 50's and 60's and featuring Don K. Reed's original Doo Wopp Shop on Sunday evenings.

The Belmonts began recording semi-frequently again in the late 2000s and into the 2010s. On January 12, 2009, they released a two-song CD single featuring re-recorded versions of their two biggest post-Dion early '60s hits, "Tell Me Why" and "Come On Little Angel". Later that year, they released the compilation album The Belmonts Anthology Vol.1 Featuring A Hundred Pounds of Clay, featuring a collaboration with Charlie Thomas of the Drifters on the song "Play a Doo-Wop Song for Me". The title track, a cover of Gene McDaniels' "A Hundred Pounds of Clay", was released as a CD single in 2010.

In late 2010, the Belmonts released two CD and digital singles from what was described an upcoming (but never-finished) holiday album called Season's Greetings. "The Eight Days of Hanukkah", written by George David Weiss, was released on November 25 by Downtown Music Group. "The Bell That Couldn't Jingle" followed on December 1, released by Downtown and Hidden Valley Music.

Also in 2010, former member Art Loria died from an accident at his home in Naples, Florida.

=== Death of Milano and final live performances (2011–2023) ===
The Belmonts, featuring Milano, D'Aleo, Gradus and Elliott, performed 50 to 100 shows each year until 2011. Milano, who had participated in every one of the Belmonts' recording sessions dating back 54 years, died of lung cancer on January 1, 2012, at the age of 72. DiMucci said of his passing: "I was shocked, obviously, because it was so sudden. It was already in stage four when he found out there was anything wrong with him. It hit hard because a relationship like we had, it’s ingrained in you. We knew each other from our teenage boyhoods; even though we weren’t close and didn’t talk in later years, what we went through together made us like family. He and the Belmonts—they were the very best. Freddie was almost like a genius with vocal harmony. I was humbled to sing with Freddie, Carlo and Angelo."

In October 2012, the Belmonts (D'Aleo and Gradus) joined former New York City disc jockey Don K. Reed as featured guests on Vito Picone's (of The Elegants) long-running, Staten Island-based cable TV show Let The Good Times Roll.

In February 2015, the Belmonts released a digital single featuring a cover of the Carpenters' "Yesterday Once More". In July 2016, The Belmonts released the single "Welcome Me Back Home", written by Warren Gradus.

Former member Carlo Mastrangelo died on April 4, 2016.

D'Aleo retired in 2018. In April 2018, they released a cover of Marc Cohn's "Walking in Memphis" as a single.

Dan Elliott died of pancreatic cancer on June 23, 2019. Former member Bob Coleman died in 2020. Warren Gradus continued to perform as the Belmonts with other individuals until shortly before his death on October 29, 2023, at the age of 78.

Former member Dion DiMucci remains active as a solo musician.

== Rock Hall omission ==
In 2012, the Rock and Roll Hall of Fame did a mass induction of six deserving pioneering groups that were left out in error when their lead singers were inducted in the Hall of Fame's early years of inductions: the Miracles (Smokey Robinson), the Crickets (Buddy Holly), the Midnighters (Hank Ballard), the Famous Flames (James Brown), the Comets (Bill Haley) and the Blue Caps (Gene Vincent). Because of the timeline when these groups were successful, it was believed that the Belmonts would be included in this induction, but none was forthcoming. Because the Belmonts scored chart hits for an additional three years after Dion left the group, coupled with the fact that the entire group (including Dion) were inducted intact into the Vocal Group Hall of Fame in 2000 (11 years after Dion's solo induction into the Rock Hall), their omission was even more puzzling. In January 2012, the year of that mass vocal group induction, Fred Milano of the Belmonts died (January 1, 2012). A Billboard magazine article dated January 3, 2012 stated: "There was strife between DiMucci and Belmonts members, who were not pleased when DiMucci was inducted into the Rock and Roll Hall of Fame without them in 1989."

== Members ==
- Angelo D'Aleo – first tenor harmony and backing vocals, occasional lead vocals (1955–1980s?, 1992, 1990s?–2018)
- Carlo Mastrangelo – bass harmony and backing vocals, occasional drums and lead vocals (1955–1962, 1966–1967, 1972, 1973, 1992; studio guest 1972; died 2016)
- Fred Milano – harmony and backing vocals, occasional lead vocals (1955–2012; died 2012)
- Dion DiMucci – lead vocals, occasional guitar (1957–1960, 1966–1967, 1972, 1973, 1992)
- Frank Lyndon – lead vocals (1962–1966, 1967–1972)
- Warren Gradus – bass harmony and backing vocals, guitar (1963–1966, 1967–2023; died 2023)
- Dan Elliott – lead vocals (1974–2019; died 2019)
- Art Loria – vocals (1984?–1989?; died 2010)
- Bob Coleman – vocals (died 2020)

== Discography ==
=== Singles ===
==== Dion and The Belmonts ====
Year	Titles (A-side, B-side) Both sides from same album except where indicated	US record label and number	Peak chart positions					Album
Year	Titles (A-side, B-side) Both sides from same album except where indicated	US record label and number	US Bllboard	US Cashbox	US Billboard AC	UK	US Billboard R&B	Album
1957	"Santa Margarita" b/w "Teenage Clementine"	Mohawk 106	—	—	—	—	—	non-album tracks
1957	"Tag Along" b/w "We Went Away"	Mohawk 107	—	—	—	—	—	non-album tracks
1958	"I Wonder Why" b/w "Teen Angel" (from Dion Sings His Greatest Hits)	Laurie 3013	22	20	—	—	—	Presenting Dion and the Belmonts
1958	"No One Knows" b/w "I Can't Go On (Rosalie)" (from Together)	Laurie 3015	19	25	—	—	12	Presenting Dion and the Belmonts
1958	"Don't Pity Me" b/w "Just You"	Laurie 3021	40	37	—	—	—	Presenting Dion and the Belmonts
1959	"A Teenager in Love" b/w "I've Cried Before"	Laurie 3027	5	6	—	28	—	Presenting Dion and the Belmonts
1959	"A Lover's Prayer"	Laurie 3035	73	61	—	—	—	Wish Upon a Star with Dion and the Belmonts
1959	"Every Little Thing I Do"	Laurie 3035	48	48	—	—	—	Together
1960	"Where or When" b/w "That's My Desire"	Laurie 3044	3	4	—	—	19	Presenting Dion and the Belmonts
1960	"When You Wish Upon a Star" b/w "Wonderful Girl" (from Presenting Dion and the Belmonts)	Laurie 3052	30	25	—	—	—	Wish Upon a Star with Dion and the Belmonts
1960	"In the Still of the Night" b/w "A Funny Feeling" (from Presenting Dion and the Belmonts)	Laurie 3059	38	35	—	—	—	Wish Upon a Star with Dion and the Belmonts
1966	"Berimbau" b/w "My Girl the Month of May"	ABC 10868	—	—	—	—	—	Together Again
1967	"For Bobbie" b/w "Movin' Man"	ABC 10896	—	—	—	—	—	Together Again
1980	"Medley" b/w "You're The Only Girl For Me" (Ernie Maresca)	Laurie 3698	–	—	–	–	–	non-album tracks
"—" denotes a recording that did not chart or was not released in that territory.

==== The Belmonts ====
Year	Titles (A-side, B-side) Both sides from same album except where indicated	US record label and catalog number	Peak chart positions			Album
Year	Titles (A-side, B-side) Both sides from same album except where indicated	US record label and catalog number	US Bllboard	US Cashbox	Canada	Album
1957	"Teenage Clementine" b/w "Santa Margherita"	Mohawk 106	—	—	—	non-album tracks
1961	"We Belong Together" b/w "Such a Long Way"	Laurie 3080	—	—	—	non-album tracks
1961	"Tell Me Why" b/w "Smoke From Your Cigarette" (non-album track)	Sabina 500	18	22	14	Carnival of Hits
1961	"Don't Get Around Much Anymore" b/w "Searching For A New Love"	Sabina 501	57	—	—	Carnival of Hits
1961	"I Need Someone" b/w "That American Dance"	Sabina 502	75	—	—	Carnival of Hits
1962	"Hombre" b/w "I Confess"	Sabina 503	—	—	—	Carnival of Hits
1962	"Come On Little Angel" b/w "How About Me"	Sabina 505	28	26	33	Carnival of Hits
1962	"Diddle-Dee-Dum (What Happens When Your Love Has Gone)" b/w "Farewell"	Sabina 507	53	51	—	non-album tracks
1962	"Ann-Marie" b/w "Ac-Cent-Tchu-Ate The Positive"	Sabina 509	86	81	—	non-album tracks
1963	"Walk On Boy" b/w "Let's Call It A Day"	Sabina 513	—	—	—	non-album tracks
1963	"More Important Things To Do" b/w "Let's Call It A Day"	Sabina 517	—	—	—	non-album tracks
1963	"C'mon Everybody (Do You Wanna Dance)" b/w "Why"	Sabina 519	—	—	—	non-album tracks
1964	"Nothing In Return" b/w "Summertime Time"	Sabina 521	—	—	—	non-album tracks
1965	"I Don't Know Why, I Just Do" b/w "Wintertime"	United Artists 809	—	—	—	non-album tracks
1965	"Today My Love Has Gone Away" b/w "(Then) I Walked Away"	United Artists 904	—	—	—	non-album tracks
1966	"To Be With You" b/w "I Got A Feeling"	United Artists 966	—	—	—	non-album tracks
1966	"You're Like A Mystery" b/w "Come With Me"	United Artists 50007	—	—	—	non-album tracks
1968	"She Only Wants To Do Her Own Thing" b/w "Reminiscences"	Dot Records	—	—	—	non-album tracks
1969	"Medley: Have You Heard / The Worst That Could Happen" b/w "Answer Me, My Love"	Dot Records	—	—	—	Summer Love
1975	"A Brand New Song" b/w "Story Teller" (non-album track)	Laurie 3631	—	—	—	Cheek to Cheek
1976	"I'll Never Fall In Love Again" b/w "Voyager"	Strawberry Records	—	—	—	Cheek to Cheek
1981	"Let's Put The Fun Back In Rock N Roll" b/w "Your Mama Ain't Always Right" (non-album track) (both with Freddy Cannon)	MiaSound 1002	81	—	—	Rock 'n' Roll Traveling Show
2009	"Tell Me Why" (re-recording) / "Come On Little Angel" (re-recording)"		—	—	—	non-album tracks
2010	"A Hundred Pounds of Clay"		—	—	—	Anthology, Vol. 1
2010	"The Eight Days of Hanukkah"	Downtown Music Group	—	—	—	non-album tracks
2010	"The Bell That Couldn't Jingle"	Downtown Music Group and Hidden Valley Music	—	—	—	non-album tracks
2015	"Yesterday Once More"		—	—	—	non-album tracks
2016	"Welcome Me Back Home"	Avery Records	—	—	—	non-album tracks
2018	"Walking in Memphis"		—	—	—	non-album tracks
"—" denotes a recording that did not chart or was not released in that territory.

==== Associated Recordings ====
Year	Artist	Single	Record Label	Notes
1962	Pete Barin	"So Wrong" b/w "Broken Heart"	Sabina 504	Backing vocals by The Belmonts
1962	Buddy Sheppard & The Holidays	"Time To Dream (Brahms Lullaby)" b/w "My Love Is Real"	Sabina 506	Pseudonym used by The Belmonts
1963	Buddy Sheppard & The Holidays	"That Background Sound" b/w "Now It's All Over"	Sabina 510	Pseudonym used by The Belmonts
1963	Pete Barin	"Lookout For Cindy" b/w "The Loneliest Gut In The World"	Sabina 512	Backing vocals by The Belmonts or The Del-Satins
1963	The Moonshiners	"Little Boat" b/w "Polly"	Sabina 515	Uncredited vocals by The Belmonts on the A-side
1964	Frank Lyndon	"Earth Angel" b/w "Don't Look At Me"	Sabina 520	Solo
1977	Foreign Intrigue	"The Wanderer" b/w "Blind Date"	E.M. 1001	Warren Gradus and Dan Elliott
1977	Foreign Intrigue	"Hey Baby Stay" b/w "We Gotta Get Out"	Laurie 3663	Warren Gradus and Dan Elliott
1978	Foreign Intrigue	"Celebrate" b/w "Jaimie"	Laurie 3669	Warren Gradus and Dan Elliott

==== Billboard Year-End performances ====
===== Dion and the Belmonts =====
Year	Song	Year-End position
1959	"A Teenager in Love"	25
1960	"Where or When"	21

=== Albums ===
Dion and the Belmonts released four studio albums and one live album and also a compilation album:

The two Laurie Records LPs are the most collectible, especially the first pressings of Presenting Dion & the Belmonts, issued as Laurie LLP-1002 (later reissued as LLP-2002). There were also later compilation albums, some of which included the separate hits of the Belmonts, and some that included the hits of Dion, and Dion and the Belmonts. Several albums were incorrectly titled as being Dion and The Belmonts, but many selections were solo Dion tracks or with The Del-Satins.

==== Studio albums ====
===== Dion and the Belmonts =====
Title	Album details	Peak chart positions
Title	Album details	US
Presenting Dion and the Belmonts	Released: November 12, 1959; Label: Laurie Records	—
Wish Upon a Star with Dion and the Belmonts	Released: June 1960; Label: Laurie Records	—
Together Again	Released: January 1967; Label: ABC Records	—
"—" denotes a recording that did not chart or was not released in that territory.

===== The Belmonts =====
Year	Album	Record Label
1962	Carnival of Hits	Sabina Records
1969	Summer Love	Dot Records
1972	Cigars, Acappella, Candy	Buddah Records
1975	Cheek to Cheek	Strawberry Records
1982	Rock 'n' Roll Traveling Show	MiaSound Records
1988	The Season of Harmony	Uptown Records

==== Live albums ====
===== Dion and The Belmonts =====
Title	Album details	Peak chart positions
Title	Album details	US
Live at Madison Square Garden 1972	Released: 1973; Label: Warner Bros. Records	144

==== Compilation albums ====
===== The Belmonts =====
Year	Album	Billboard 200	Record Label
2009	Anthology, Vol. 1	-	Downtown Records
