= I Wonder Why =

Single by Dion and the Belmonts

from the album Presenting Dion and the Belmonts
- A-side: "I Wonder Why"
- B-side: "Teen Angel"
- Released: May 5, 1958
- Genre: Doo-wop; rock and roll
- Length: 2:20
- Label: Laurie
- Songwriters: Melvin Anderson, Ricardo Weeks

Dion and the Belmonts singles chronology
"I Wonder Why" (1958)	"No One Knows" (1958)

"I Wonder Why" is a doo-wop song, written by Melvin Anderson with lyrics by Ricardo Weeks. The song was first recorded by Dion and the Belmonts.

== Background ==
It is sung from the point of view of a man telling his girlfriend that he loves her but does not know why. The song is noted for Carlo Mastrangelo's bass part.

== Chart performance ==
"I Wonder Why" was released as Laurie Records' first single (number 3013), and was the group's first national pop chart hit, in 1958. The song went to No. 22 on the Hot 100.

== In popular culture ==
Nicolas Cage did a cover version of the song in the film Peggy Sue Got Married (1986).

The song was also used in the pilot episode of The Sopranos, in a scene where Tony Soprano gleefully chases Alex Mahaffey with Christopher's car through a parking lot.

In the movie Christine (1983), the song is played by Christine to let Arnie know that she forgave him.

== Notable cover versions ==
- A cover was sung by Showaddywaddy in 1978, reaching No. 2 in the UK Singles Chart.
