= I'm Headin' for California =

1946 RCA Victor 78, 20-1834-B, Glenn Miller Orchestra with Tex Beneke.

1947 UK release as an HMV 78, B.D. 5956, Matrix # D6-VB-1671.

"I'm Headin' For California" is a 1944 song composed by Glenn Miller and Arthur Malvin and performed for radio broadcast. The song was released in 1946 as a 78 single by the Glenn Miller Orchestra led by Tex Beneke. The song was Glenn's last composition.

== Background ==
"I'm Headin' For California" was written by Glenn Miller with Arthur Malvin, a member of the Crew Chiefs, copyrighted on September 21, 1944, and published by the Chappell Co., Inc.

The first time the song was played as part of a 1944 radio broadcast by the dance band of the AAF orchestra and sung by drummer Ray McKinley in the UK. The Glenn Miller Army Air Force Band performed the song on December 4, 1944, on the Swing Shift program.

The song was recorded on Thursday, February 21, 1946, at a session at the RCA Victor Studios in New York. The recording was released as a 78 single, RCA Victor 20-1834, b/w "Swing Low, Sweet Chariot" arranged by Bill Finegan, by the Glenn Miller Orchestra led by Tex Beneke in 1946 and as an HMV 78, BD 5956, in the UK in 1947, b/w "Texas Tex". This was the first single released by the Glenn Miller Orchestra under the direction of Tex Beneke. The recording appeared on the 1998 album Glenn Miller Orchestra: A Tribute to Tex Beneke and the 2001 release The Legendary Big Bands: Tex Beneke by Castle/Pulse.

The 1944 radio broadcast recording with Ray McKinley on lead vocals appeared on the CD collection 75th Anniversary Tribute: Glenn Miller and The Army Air Force Band on Sounds of Yesteryear.

== Reception ==
The Billboard issue of March 30, 1946, lists Glenn Miller and Arthur Malvin as the composers: "Mated is a pleasant plattering of 'I'm Headin' for California,' a rhythmic ditty with Arthur Malvin, the band's romantic voice, and the late maestro authored after the fashion of 'Chattanooga Choo Choo.'" The recording was reviewed in the Billboard Data and Reviews section: "An infectious rhythm ditty fashioned along the same lines as 'Chattanooga Choo Choo' and cut in crisp manner by the ex-G.I. gang now led by Tex Beneke, who is joined by the harmonies of the Crew Chiefs, a mixed crew, for this lively chant.... It's spry syncopating with the throaty singing of Tex Beneke assisted by the finely blended voices of the Crew Chiefs."

The song was first performed by the dance band of the AAF orchestra and sung by Ray McKinley when Glenn Miller was in England in 1944. An aircheck of this performance was released on the 2010 Sounds of Yesteryear album Glenn's Travels.

The song is autobiographical. Miller lived in California during the filming of Sun Valley Serenade in 1941. He and his wife Helen bought a 54-acre ranch east of Los Angeles, Rancho Duarte, in Duarte, California, which had citrus groves and was named "Tuxedo Junction". This was the location where Miller planned to live and raise his family after the war.

== Sources ==
- Way, Chris. The Big Bands Go To War. Edinburgh, Scotland, UK: Mainstream Publishing, 1991
- Billboard Magazine, March 30, 1946.
- Flower, John. Moonlight Serenade: A Bio-discography of the Glenn Miller Civilian Band. New Rochelle, NY: Arlington House, 1972.
- Simon, George Thomas. Simon Says. New York: Galahad, 1971. ISBN 0-88365-001-0.
- Simon, George Thomas. Glenn Miller and His Orchestra. NY: Crowell, 1974.
