= Babes in Arms (film) =

1939 film by Busby Berkeley

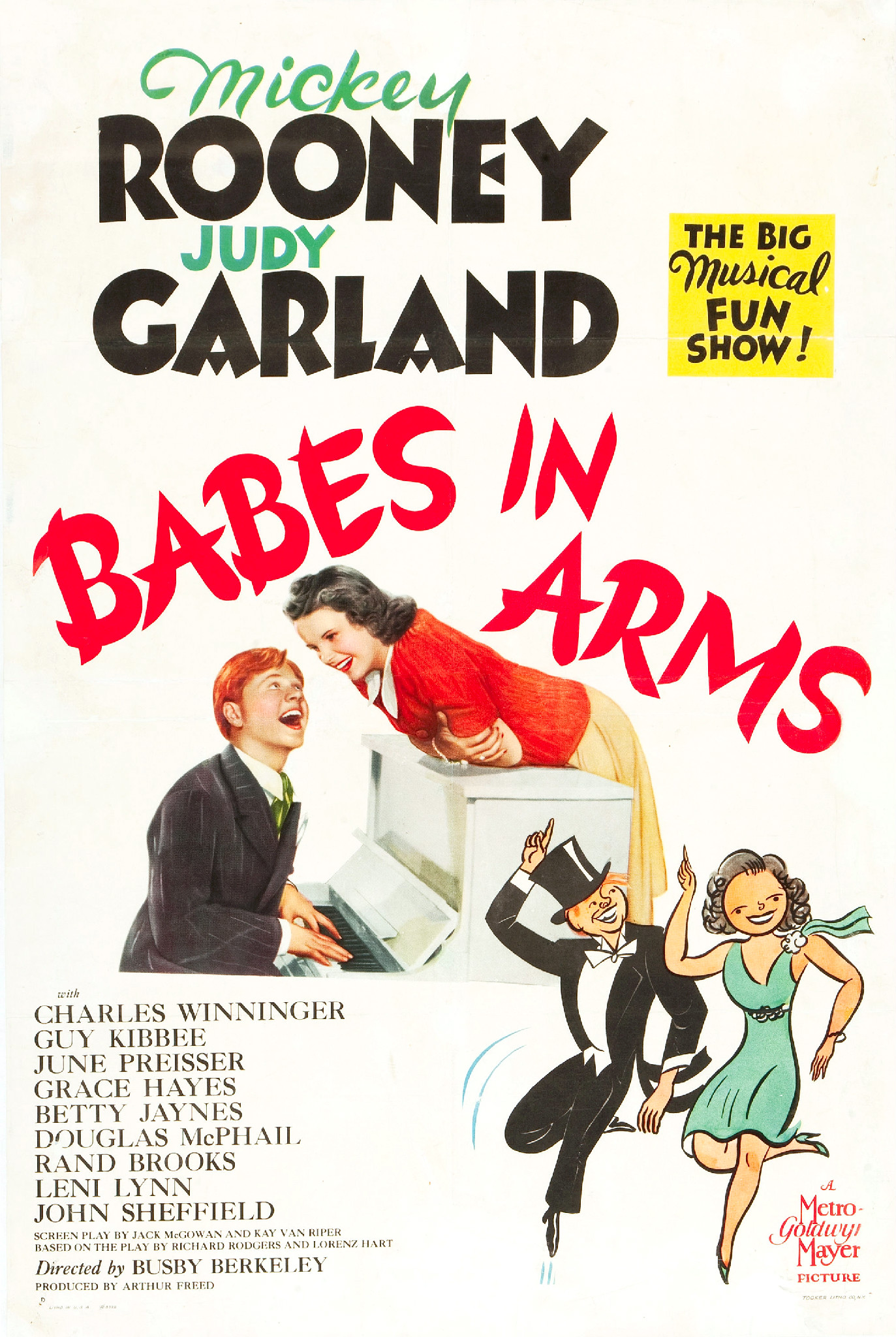
- Theatrical release poster
- Directed by: Busby Berkeley
- Written by: Uncredited: John Meehan; Noel Langley; Anita Loos; Florence Ryerson; Annalee Whitmore Fadiman; Edgar Allan Woolf
- Screenplay by: Jack McGowan; Kay Van Riper
- Based on: Babes in Arms by: Richard Rodgers; Lorenz Hart
- Produced by: Arthur Freed
- Starring: Mickey Rooney; Judy Garland
- Cinematography: Ray June
- Edited by: Frank Sullivan
- Music by: Songs: Arthur Freed (lyrics) & Nacio Herb Brown (music); Richard Rodgers (music) & Lorenz Hart (lyrics); Harold Arlen (music) & E. Y. Harburg (lyrics); Roger Edens (music & lyrics) et al.
- Color process: Black and white
- Production company: Metro-Goldwyn-Mayer
- Distributed by: Loew's, Inc.
- Release dates: September 15, 1939 (Houston); October 13, 1939 (United States)
- Running time: 93 minutes
- Country: United States
- Language: English
- Budget: $745,341
- Box office: $3,335,000

Babes in Arms is the 1939 coming of age American film version of the 1937 Broadway musical of the same title. Directed by Busby Berkeley, it stars Mickey Rooney and Judy Garland, and features Charles Winninger, Guy Kibbee, June Preisser, Grace Hayes, and Betty Jaynes. It was Garland and Rooney's second film together as lead characters after their earlier successful pairing in the fourth of the Andy Hardy films. The film concerns a group of youngsters trying to put on a show to prove their vaudevillian parents wrong and make it to Broadway. The original Broadway script was significantly revamped, restructured, and rewritten to accommodate Hollywood's needs. Almost all of the Rodgers and Hart songs from the Broadway musical were discarded.

== Plot ==
In 1921, vaudeville performer Joe Moran (Winninger) announces the birth of a son, but after the advent of talking pictures in 1928, vaudeville fails. His son Michael "Mickey" Moran (Rooney) writes songs, and Patsy Barton (Garland) sings "Good Morning". Mickey sells the song for $100. He gives Patsy his pin and kisses her. Mickey learns that his parents Joe and Florrie (Grace Hayes) are going on the road without the children, and he disagrees. Patsy and Molly Moran (Jaynes) sing "You Are My Lucky Star" and "Broadway Rhythm", but Joe says no to their going. So, Mickey proposes the kids put on a show, and Don Brice (Douglas McPhail) sings "Babes in Arms" as they march and make a bonfire. Joe dismisses Mickey.

Martha Steele (Margaret Hamilton) and her nephew Jeff (Rand Brooks) from military school complain to Judge Black (Kibbee) about the Vaudeville kids. She suggests that the judge send the kids to the workhouse for children because their parents cannot take care of them, but the judge will not take them from their homes. In a drugstore, Mickey and Patsy meet movie star Baby Rosalie Essex (Preisser), but Mickey gets in a fight with Jeff. Mickey tells Judge Black that his parents' show flopped. The judge gives Mickey 30 days to pay damages. Don and Molly sing "Where or When" with an orchestra of children. Mickey has a date with Baby and dines in her house. Mickey wants Baby in the show, which needs $287. She offers to pay it. Mickey smokes a cigar and leaves sick.

Mickey tells Patsy that Baby has to play the lead because of the money. Mickey directs rehearsal with Baby and Don, imitating Clark Gable and Lionel Barrymore. Patsy sees Mickey kiss Baby. Mickey tries to stop Patsy from leaving. On the bus, Patsy sings "I Cried for You". Patsy goes to a theater to see her mother (Ann Shoemaker). Patsy says that Mickey is putting on a show to keep the kids out of an institution. Patsy's mother tells Patsy not to quit her show.

Baby's father takes her out of the show, and Mickey asks Patsy to go on. In the show, Patsy sings "Daddy Was a Minstrel Man". Mickey and Patsy put on blackface and sing a medley with Don. Patsy sings "I'm Just Wild About Harry", but a storm drives the audience away. Mickey learns that his father quit theater and got an elevator job. Mrs. Steele says the children must report and gives Joe the paper. Mickey gets a letter from producer Maddox (Henry Hull), who liked the show and produces it. As Mickey listens, Maddox asks Joe to teach the youngsters in the show. Mickey introduces the show by singing "God's Country", which the company contrasts to fascism. Mickey and Patsy satirize Franklin and Eleanor Roosevelt, and then everybody dances and finishes with a chorus of "God's Country".

== Cast ==
- Mickey Rooney as Mickey Moran
- Judy Garland as Patsy Barton
- Charles Winninger as Joe Moran
- Guy Kibbee as Judge John Black
- June Preisser as "Baby" Rosalie Essex
- Grace Hayes as Florrie Moran
- Betty Jaynes as Molly Moran
- Douglas McPhail as Don Brice
- Rand Brooks as Jeff Steele
- Leni Lynn as Dody Martin
- Margaret Hamilton as Martha Steele
- Joseph Crehan as Mr. Essex
- George McKay as Brice
- Henry Roquemore as Shaw
- Lelah Tyler as Mrs. Brice
- Sidney Miller as Sid

Cast notes:

- Cliff Edwards appears in a clip from The Hollywood Revue of 1929 of the song "Singin' in the Rain"
- Vaudevillian Charles King appears in a clip from The Broadway Melody

== Production ==
Babes in Arms is the first film directed in its entirety at MGM by choreographer Busby Berkeley. It was produced by the Arthur Freed unit at the studio.

Filming of Babes in Arms began on May 12, 1939, soon after Garland and Hamilton had finished filming The Wizard of Oz, and was completed on July 18, 1939.

The original release of the film included a segment during the finale in which Rooney and Garland lampoon President Franklin D. Roosevelt and First Lady Eleanor Roosevelt. The scene was removed after Roosevelt's death for the film's reissue in 1948. It was thought to be lost, but was discovered on a 16-mm reel and restored in the 1990s.

== Music ==
Most of the Rodgers and Hart songs from the stage musical were cut, except for the title tune, "The Lady Is a Tramp" – used as background music when the character of "Baby" Rosalie Essex is on screen – and "Where or When". Freed and Nacio Herb Brown wrote a new song for the film, "Good Morning", later to be a musical number in Singin' in the Rain. "God's Country", from Hooray for What! by Harold Arlen and E. Y. Harburg – composer and lyricist for The Wizard of Oz – was used for the finale. Garland and Rooney later sang "I Wish I Were in Love Again" from the Broadway version of the show in the Rodgers and Hart biopic Words and Music (1948). Garland also sang "Johnny One Note" in the same picture. The film, as well as the musical, included the song "I'm Just Wild About Harry", which was written in 1921 for the Broadway show Shuffle Along, with lyrics by Noble Sissle and music by Eubie Blake.

Musical numbers were recorded in stereophonic sound, but released to theaters with conventional monaural sound. Recent home-video releases feature some of the original stereo recordings.

== Reception ==
=== Release ===
The film premiered on October 13, 1939, and became one of the 10 biggest hits of the year. According to MGM records, it earned $2,311,000 in the US and Canada and $1,024,000 elsewhere resulting in a profit of $1,542,000.

On Rotten Tomatoes, Babes in Arms holds a rating of 90% based on reviews from 40 critics with the consensus: "With all the adorable gumption of its young stars, Babes in Arms pays thoroughly entertaining tribute to the magic of show business."

=== Accolades ===
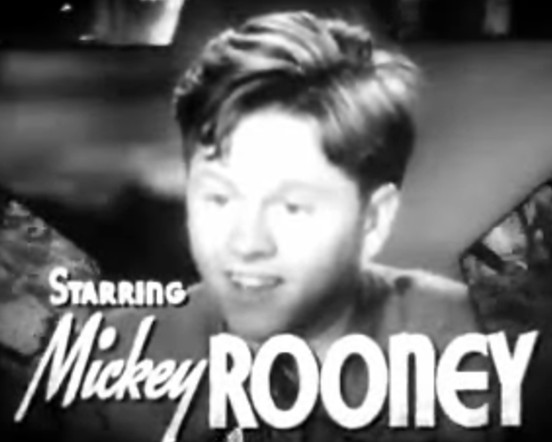
The performance of Mickey Rooney received widespread acclaim, with 19-year-old Rooney garnering a nomination for an Academy Award for Best Actor in a Leading Role, becoming the second-youngest Best Actor nominee.

The film was nominated for two Academy Awards: Best Actor in a Leading Role for Mickey Rooney, who was 19 at the time and became the second-youngest Best Actor nominee, and Best Music, Scoring by Roger Edens and Georgie Stoll.

== Home media ==
Babes in Arms was released on VHS tape in 1992. It was released on DVD for the first time as part of Warner Bros. five-disc DVD set The Mickey Rooney & Judy Garland Collection on September 25, 2007. The set contains Babes in Arms, Babes on Broadway, Girl Crazy, and Strike Up the Band, as well as a fifth disc containing bonus features on Rooney and Garland.

== See also ==
- List of American films of 1939
