= Where or When =

1930s American show tune, later covered by many artists

Song
- Published: 1937 by Chappell & Co.
- Genre: Showtune
- Composer: Richard Rodgers
- Lyricist: Lorenz Hart

"Where or When" is a show tune from the 1937 Rodgers and Hart musical Babes in Arms. It was first performed by Ray Heatherton and Mitzi Green. That same year, Hal Kemp recorded a popular version. The song also appeared in the film version of Babes in Arms two years later.

"Where or When"

Single by Dion and the Belmonts

from the album Presenting Dion and the Belmonts
- B-side: "That's My Desire"
- Released: December 1959
- Recorded: 1959
- Genre: Pop; doo-wop
- Length: 2:37
- Label: Laurie
- Songwriters: Richard Rodgers, Lorenz Hart

Dion and the Belmonts singles chronology
"Every Little Thing I Do" (1959)	"Where or When" (1959)	"When You Wish Upon a Star" (1960)

== Babes in Arms ==
"Where or When" is the first number to appear in the original Broadway production of Babes in Arms. The musical opens in fictional Seaport, Long Island on a hectic morning that finds most of the adult population embarking on a five-month vaudeville tour. Soon after his parents' departure, 20-year-old Valentine LaMar (played by Ray Heatherton) discovers at his doorstep a young hitchhiker named Billie Smith (played by Mitzi Green). Instantly smitten, he engages her in a discussion of movie stars, self-defense maneuvers, and Nietzsche's theory of individualism, at which point Val impulsively steals a kiss. Both admit to a powerful sense of déjà vu and sing "Where or When" as a duet.

MGM bought the screen rights to the play in 1938, and the following year the studio released Babes in Arms, starring Mickey Rooney and Judy Garland. The picture bore little resemblance to its stage predecessor, with the characters and plot substantially revised by 10 studio writers, and only two numbers being retained from the score. "Where or When" appeared 37 minutes into the film, sung in a duet by Betty Jaynes and Douglas McPhail, and partially reprised solo by Garland.

== Lyrics ==
The lyrics of Where or When illustrate a memory phenomenon known as déjà vu. The original line in the bridge was "Some things that happen for the first time", which fits the context of the song—it says that things that happening in the present seem as though they happened before, even though we know that they did not. But some artists sing it as "Some things that happened for the first time", which gives it an entirely different, incorrect meaning, suggesting that things that already happened in the past are happening once more.

Ultimately, the uncertainty of whether the couple had met before is unresolved in the lyrics, just wistfully chalked up to "tricks that your mind can play" in the final line of the second verse, which is not often recorded.

== Recorded versions ==
Where or When has become part of the Great American Songbook, having been recorded by scores of popular artists over the decades, starting with a successful cover by Hal Kemp and his Orchestra shortly after its debut in 1937.

Other memorable recordings include those by:

- Douglas McPhail
- Betty Jaynes
- Peggy Lee and the Benny Goodman Sextet in 1941
- Lena Horne in 1948
- Ella Fitzgerald in 1956
- Frank Sinatra recorded it three times, in 1945, 1958 and 1966
- Dean Martin is credited with numerous interpretations
- A doo-wop 45 rpm single by Dion & The Belmonts in 1960

More contemporary interpretations have been recorded by Barbra Streisand, Carly Simon, Judy Collins, Dave Edmunds, Harry Connick Jr., George Michael, Bryan Ferry, Mandy Patinkin, Diana Krall, Michael Buble, and Laufey.

Instrumental versions were recorded by Count Basie, Dave Brubeck, Duke Ellington, Etta Jones, and others.

== Pop culture ==
- Judy Garland in the 1939 MGM musical Babes in Arms
- Ellen Burstyn in the 1974 Martin Scorsese drama Alice Doesn't Live Here Anymore.
