= Have Ya Got Any Gum, Chum? =

Song by The Glenn Miller Orchestra
- Written: 1944
- Recorded: November 3, 1945
- Genre: Jazz, big-band
- Length: 2:30
- Songwriter(s): Murray Kane

Audio sample
- "Have Ya Got Any Gum, Chum?": file; help

"Have Ya Got Any Gum, Chum?" is a big band song written by Murray Kane in 1944. The music and lyrics were registered in the United States Copyright Catalog on February 6, 1945.

== Recordings ==
On December 8, 1944, the song was recorded by Fred Waring and His Pennsylvanians. This version, however, was not released until June 1950 when it was included on his Pleasure Time album by Decca.

In November 1945, it was recorded by the Glenn Miller Orchestra for a radio broadcast. It was recorded the following year by Ray McKinley with a Billboard magazine review that called the recording a "cute novelty" with "plain and effective" vocals. McKinley's version was released as the B-side to his version of "We'll Gather Lilacs" from Ivor Novello's Perchance to Dream.

== Origin ==
The song comes from the phrase "Got any gum, chum?" which was popular with British children at the time of World War II. Children would shout the phrase at passing American soldiers in an attempt to be given chewing gum or similar rations.

In the liner notes to the 1983 compilation In the USA and Europe (Vol. II), Richard C. March (then-secretary of the UK-based International Glenn Miller Society) described the song as a "topical period piece" that would not be appreciated by "today's younger generation" but would be understood by those "brought up at the time of sweet rationing". The lyrics mention the gum brands Chiclets, Spearmint, Doublemint, and Juicy Fruit.
