= Betty Jaynes (actress) =

American actress (1921–2018)

- Jaynes in 1938
- Born: Betty Jayne Schultz; February 12, 1921; Greeneville, Tennessee, U.S.
- Died: November 22, 2018 (aged 97); Santa Monica, California, U.S.
- Education: Starrett School for Girls
- Occupations: Singer; actress
- Spouses: Douglas McPhail (m. 1938; div. 1941) Bill Roberts (m. 1943)

Betty Jaynes (born Betty Jayne Schultz, February 12, 1921 – November 22, 2018) was an American operatic singer and B-movie actress from the late 1930s to mid-1940s.

== Early years ==
The daughter of Louis C. Schultz and Stella Schultz, Jaynes was born in Greeneville, Tennessee, but she attended the Starrett School for Girls in Chicago. She has a brother, Robert, and two sisters, Lorraine and Marion.

== Career ==
Jaynes made her concert debut when she was 15, performing with pianist Janet Gunn at Orchestra Hall in Chicago. At the same age, she made a "sensational debut" with the Chicago City Opera Company in La boheme. In a Life magazine article, she said she would "quit school and consider movies." Her radio debut also occurred when she was 15, as she sang on The Ford Sunday Evening Hour on CBS in January 1937.

On December 9, 1936, Probate Judge John F. O'Connell in Chicago approved Jaynes' contracts with MGM and a concert booking company. Her status as a minor required court approval, with her mother as her guardian. The MGM contract guaranteed $250 to $1,300 per week plus additional payments when she made films. The booking contract guaranteed $1,000 per concert.

She began working in Hollywood on April 1, 1937. She appeared as Molly Moran in Babes in Arms in 1939, then in a series of minor parts in seven MGM movies through 1944, including Meet the People, starring Lucille Ball. Her last major acting role was in 1952, in an I Love Lucy episode, "The Operetta".

== Personal life ==
Jaynes married actor and budding baritone Douglas McPhail on June 10, 1938, in San Diego, California. They had a daughter and were divorced in 1941; McPhail committed suicide in 1944. She married a second time in 1943 to Bill Roberts, who had been a singer for Tommy Dorsey. She died in Santa Monica, California, in November 2018 at the age of 97.
