= Douglas McPhail =

American actor

- McPhail in 1939
- Born: April 16, 1914; Los Angeles, California, U.S.
- Died: December 7, 1944 (aged 30)
- Occupation: Actor
- Years active: 1936–1942
- Spouse: Betty Jaynes (m. 1938; div. 1941)
- Children: 1

Douglas McPhail (April 16, 1914 – December 7, 1944) was an American actor and singer, active from the 1930s to 1944.

== Early years ==
McPhail was born and educated in Los Angeles. As a child he wanted to become a singer and was encouraged in that aim by his mother while his father wanted him to become an attorney. He left college after one year to pursue a career in singing.

== Career ==
When McPhail left college he worked as a seaman on a South America-bound frieghter because he had heard that singers were in demand there. Once in South America he sang with American bands in nightclubs.

After McPhail returned home he had small parts in light opera in San Francisco and Los Angeles and took voice lessons. He supplemented his income by working as a service station attendant when he was not in a production.

He began working as an extra in films, one of which was Maytime. Jeanette MacDonald encouraged him not only to continue his voice lessons but also to begin studying drama. She also complimented his voice to studio officials, which resulted in his taking screen and voice tests. Jack Chertok saw the screen test, interviewed McPhail, and heard him sing, after which he signed McPhail to be leading man in six films.

== Personal life and death ==
McPhail married Betty Jaynes on June 10, 1938, in San Diego, California. They were divorced on August 26, 1940. They had a daughter. He committed suicide on December 7, 1944, in Hollywood.

== Filmography ==
Year	Title	Role	Notes
1936	San Francisco	Tenor in 'La Traviata'	Voice, Uncredited
1936	Born to Dance	Solo Bit in 'Entrance of Lucy James' Number	Uncredited
1937	Maytime	Minor Role	Uncredited
1937	The Last Gangster	Reporter	Uncredited
1938	Test Pilot	Pilot Singing in Cafe	Uncredited
1938	Yellow Jack	Joey - Patient	Uncredited
1938	The Toy Wife	Leon - the Second Brother	Uncredited
1938	The Crowd Roars	Reporter	Uncredited
1938	Sweethearts	Harvey	
1939	Honolulu	Bing Crosby Impersonator	Uncredited
1939	Babes in Arms	Don Brice	
1940	Broadway Melody of 1940	Masked Singer	Uncredited
1940	Little Nellie Kelly	Dennis Fogarty	
1942	Born to Sing	Murray Saunders	(final film role)
