= Arthur Avenue =

Avenue in the Bronx, New York

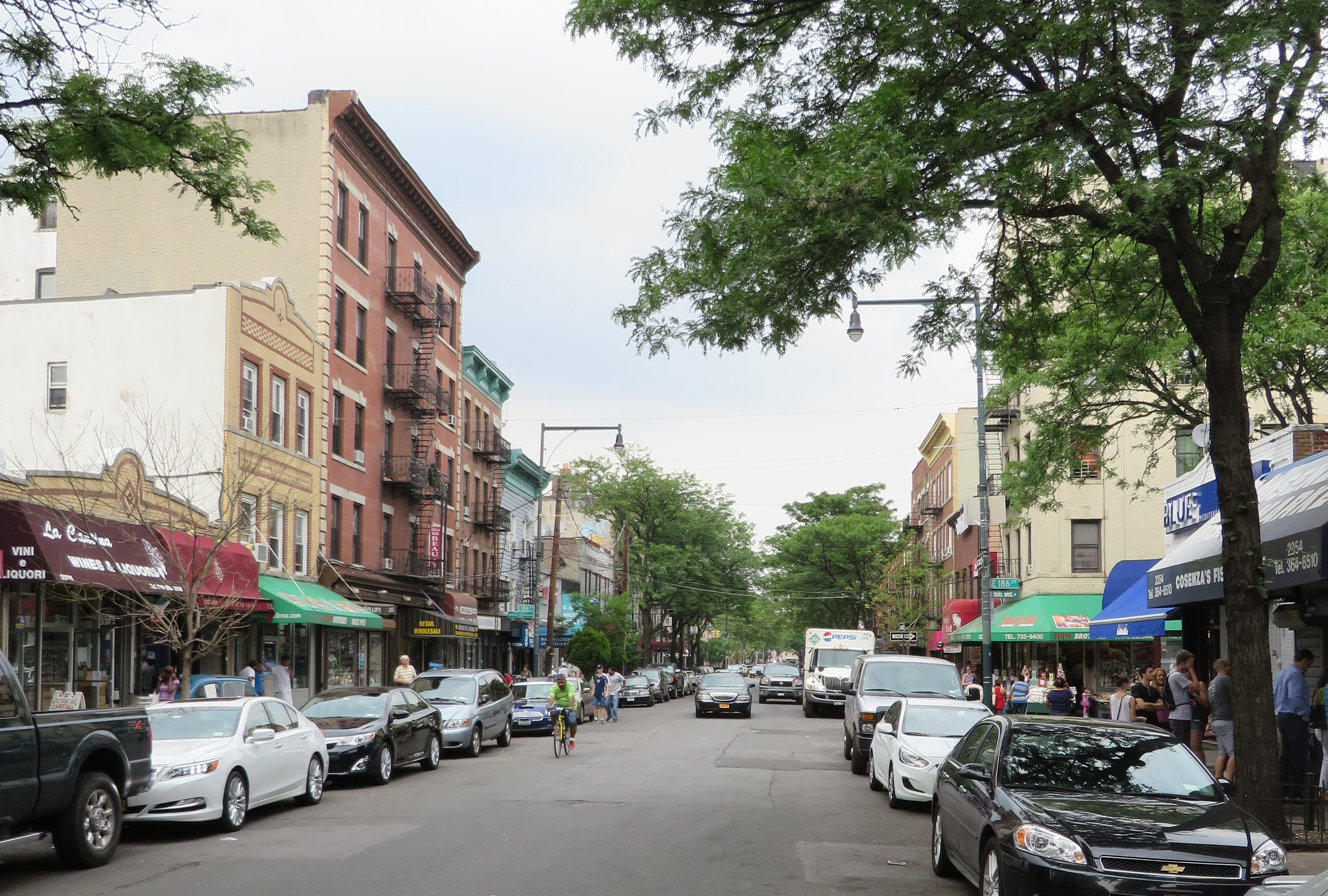
- Arthur Avenue between 184th and 186th Streets in 2014
- Interactive map of Arthur Avenue
- Namesake: Chester A. Arthur
- Owner: City of New York
- Maintained by: NYCDOT
- Length: 1.2 mi (1.9 km)
- Location: Bronx, New York City
- South end: Crotona Park North in Tremont
- North end: Fordham Road in Belmont

Arthur Avenue is a street in the Belmont neighborhood of the Bronx, New York City, which serves as the center of the Bronx's "Little Italy". Although the historical and commercial center of Little Italy is Arthur Avenue itself, the area stretches across East 187th Street from Arthur Avenue to Beaumont Avenue, and is similarly lined with delis, bakeries, cafes and various Italian merchants.

The Bronx's Little Italy has an Italian immigrant heritage that dates back to around the 1910s or 1920s. Arthur Avenue and Morris Park are viewed as the Bronx's primary Italian American communities. Other Italian-American communities in the Bronx are the working class and middle-class neighborhoods of Schuylerville, Country Club, Pelham Bay, and sections of Fordham. The avenue itself is named for former U.S. president Chester A. Arthur.

== In popular culture ==
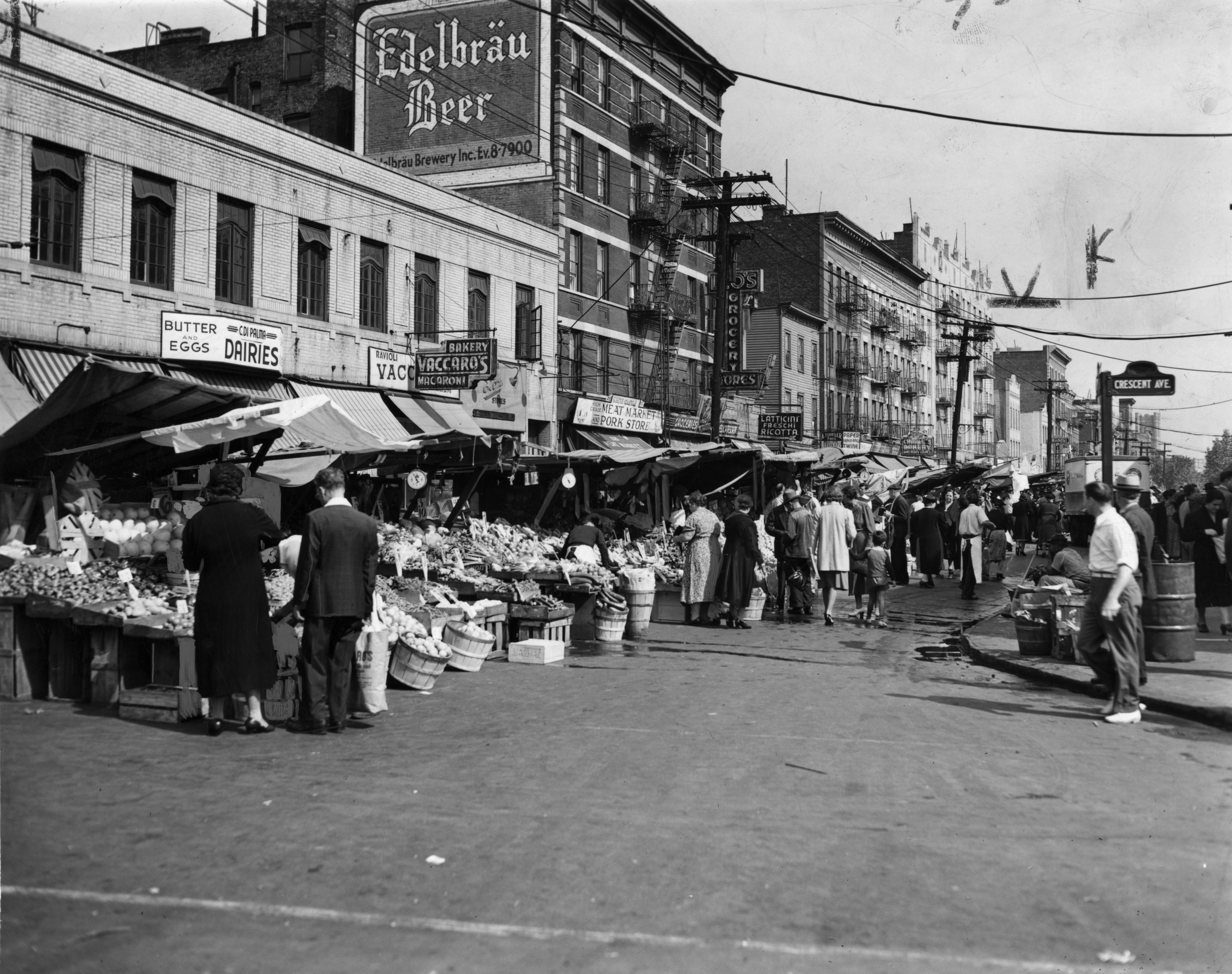
Arthur Avenue pushcarts in 1940

Robert De Niro's directing debut A Bronx Tale (1993) takes place in the vicinity of Belmont. However, it was largely filmed in Astoria, Queens. The series Third Watch was based on Arthur Avenue initially, with the first episode referring to the firehouse as "Camelot," based on its location at the intersection of King Street and Arthur Avenue. The 1973 film "The Seven-Ups" starring Roy Scheider was filmed on Arthur Avenue and Hoffman Street. In 2003, a scene from the HBO hit series The Sopranos was shot in Mario's restaurant, which had been the planned site of a mob hit in The Godfather (1972), which was turned down by the owner of the restaurant.

Leonard of James Frey's A Million Little Pieces grew up in this area. Much of the novel Underworld takes place near Arthur Avenue. The author himself, Don DeLillo, grew up there.

The opening scene of the 1955 film Marty shows Arthur Avenue. The film's main character, Marty Piletti, works at a meat market on Arthur Avenue, and in the movie he considers buying it from its owner.

Early scenes in the 1967 film The Incident take place on 183rd Street and Third Avenue and in the Third Avenue El station (once the primary El station for Arthur Avenue). The scenes, featuring Martin Sheen and Tony Musante, involve the mugging of a pedestrian. The Belmont station filled in for one on the Jerome Avenue El line, which is the line that forms the film's narrative.

The 1950s doo-wop music group called Dion and the Belmonts originated in this area, named after Belmont Avenue. Italian rock band Elio e le Storie Tese at the end of their song "Gargaroz" in studio album Studentessi (2008) featured a mock advertising of a food shop in Arthur Avenue, in Italian language with some strange Americanisms.

A reality TV show called Mama's Boys of the Bronx was about grown men living on and around Arthur Avenue in the Bronx with their mothers.

Lady Gaga's music video for "Eh, Eh (Nothing Else I Can Say)" (2008) takes place in and around Arthur Avenue/Little Italy.

In 2016, Arthur Avenue was named one of "America's Greatest Streets" by the American Planning Association.

The 2019 movie Bottom of the 9th, which stars Joe Manganiello and Sofia Vergara, was filmed throughout the neighborhood, specifically featuring Arthur Avenue. The screenplay for the film was written by Robert Bruzio, who grew up on Arthur Avenue.
