= Artie Malvin =

American singer

Artie Malvin (July 7, 1922 – June 16, 2006) was a composer and vocalist who was the baritone member of The Crew Chiefs. He also sang with Glenn Miller's band.

== Career ==
During World War II, Malvin performed with Glenn Miller as part of The Crew Chiefs. Recordings of his performances with Glenn Miller and the Army Air Force Band were released as V-Discs.

After World War II and Glenn Miller's death, Malvin became heavily immersed in the popular music of the 1940s and 1950s, being involved in everything from children's music, to the beginnings of rock and roll, to jingles for commercials. In the late 1950s he became involved in television as the music arranger for The Pat Boone Chevy Showroom, and he contributed to Jimmy Dorsey's final recording sessions, including the #2 hit "So Rare". He later worked with "The Carol Burnett Show" doing special musical material for which he won two Emmy Awards; one for a parody of the Fred Astaire and Ginger Rogers movies. The Broadway musical, "Sugar Babies", for which Malvin received a Tony nomination, was inspired by his composition "Let Me Be Your Sugar Baby".

== Compositions ==
Malvin's compositions include I'm Headin' For California with Glenn Miller in 1944, Join the W.A.C., Time in the Town of Berlin, Glenn's Travels, and Goodnight Wherever You Are.

== Sources ==
- Grudens, Richard (2004). Chattanooga Choo Choo: The Life and Times of the World Famous Glenn Miller Orchestra. ISBN 1-57579-277-X
- Flower, John (1972). Moonlight Serenade: a bio-discography of the Glenn Miller Civilian Band. New Rochelle, NY: Arlington House. ISBN 0-87000-161-2.
- Simon, George Thomas (1980). Glenn Miller and His Orchestra. New York: Da Capo paperback. ISBN 0-306-80129-9.
