= The DeVilles =

- Origin: Bronx, New York City

The DeVilles were New York band on that worked for the Bronx-based Arrawak Records. “No Money” (Williams, Anderson, McDonald, Stewart) by The DeVilles was the label's first local success in 1962. The label's other acts included The Del-Airs "I'm Lonely" (1962), Noble "Thin Man" Watts "Leave That Little Girl Alone" (1964), June Bateman "I Don't Wanta" (1964), Carl Burrell "I Love A Lover" (1964), Les Cooper and The Soul Rockers "I Can Do The Soul Jerk" (1965).
