= Belmont, Bronx =

Neighborhood in New York City

Belmont
- Neighborhood of the Bronx
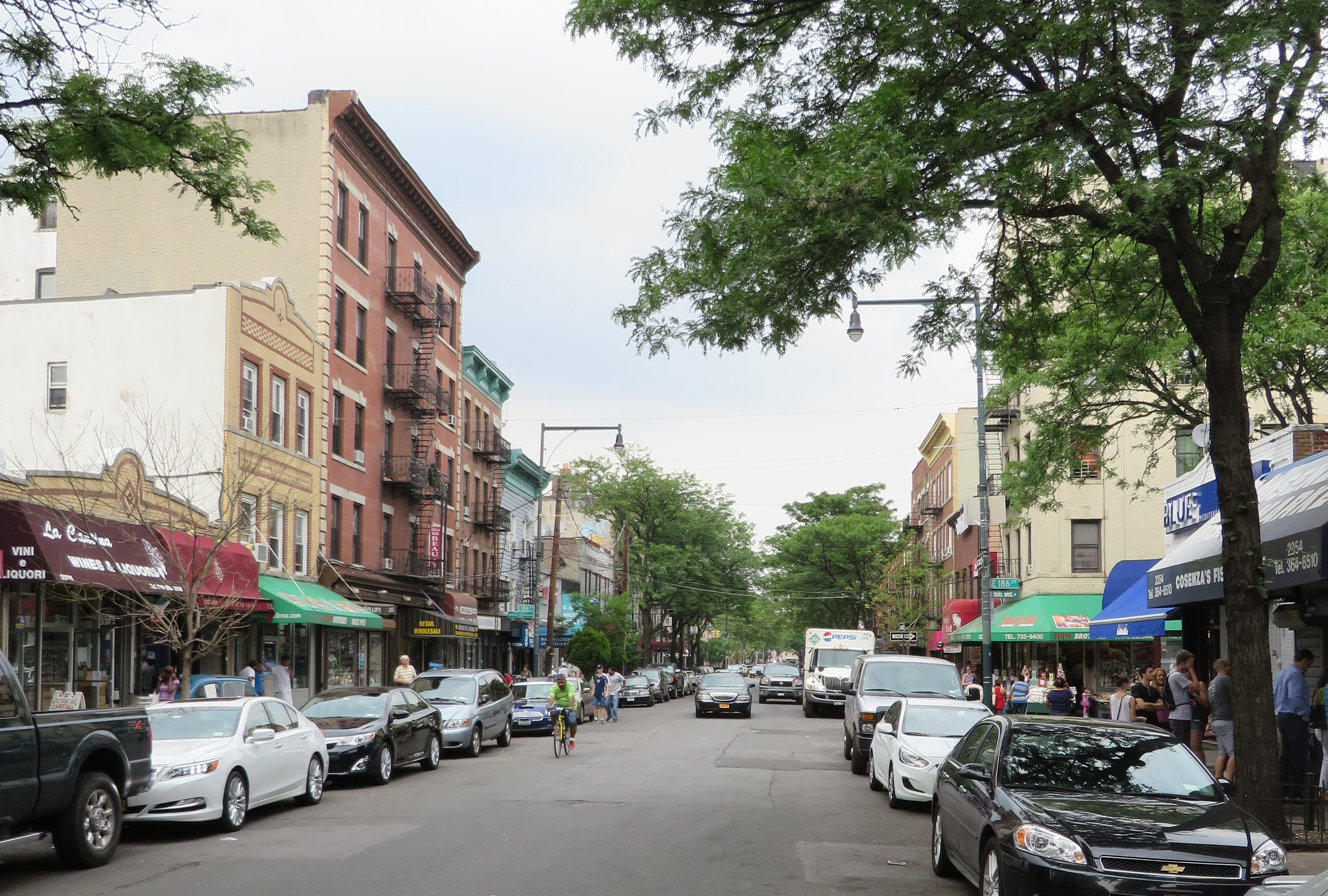
- Arthur Avenue streetscape
- Interactive map of Belmont
- Coordinates: 40.855°N 73.886°W
- Country: United States
- State: New York
- City: New York City
- Borough: Bronx
- Community District: The Bronx 6

Area
  - Total: 0.476 sq mi (1.23 km^{2})

Population (2010)
  - Total: 27,378
  - Density: 57,500/sq mi (22,200/km^{2})

Economics
  - Median income: $26,790

Ethnicity
  - Hispanic: 58.2%
  - Black: 18.5%
  - White: 19.7%
  - Asian: 2.3%
  - Others: 1.4%
- ZIP Codes: 10457, 10458, 10460
- Area code: 718, 347, 929, and 917
- Website: www.belmont.nyc

Belmont is a primarily residential neighborhood in the Bronx in New York City. Its boundaries are Fordham Road to the north, Bronx Park to the east, East 181st Street to the south, and Third Avenue to the west. These boundaries give the neighborhood a crescent-like shape. The neighborhood is noted for its "close-knit community" and "small-town feel", and as a result of its cultural history and wide array of Italian businesses, is widely known as the "Little Italy of the Bronx". Arthur Avenue, noted for its local restaurants and markets, is its primary thoroughfare.

Belmont is part of Bronx Community Board 6, and its ZIP Codes include 10457, 10458 and 10460. It is patrolled by the New York City Police Department's 48th Precinct.

== History ==
In colonial times, the land that became Belmont was farmland, much like the rest of western Bronx. It was primarily owned by the Lorillard family, the site of the location of the Lorillard Snuff Mill (for which a street was named after their family name). After moving its tobacco operations from Lower Manhattan to the central Bronx in the late 18th century, the family greatly expanded its property in the area, which became known as the Belmont Estate. When the Lorillards moved to New Jersey in 1870, the city acquired part of their land for Bronx Park (including what is now the Bronx Zoo and New York Botanical Garden). Another part was divided into the streets that form Belmont today.

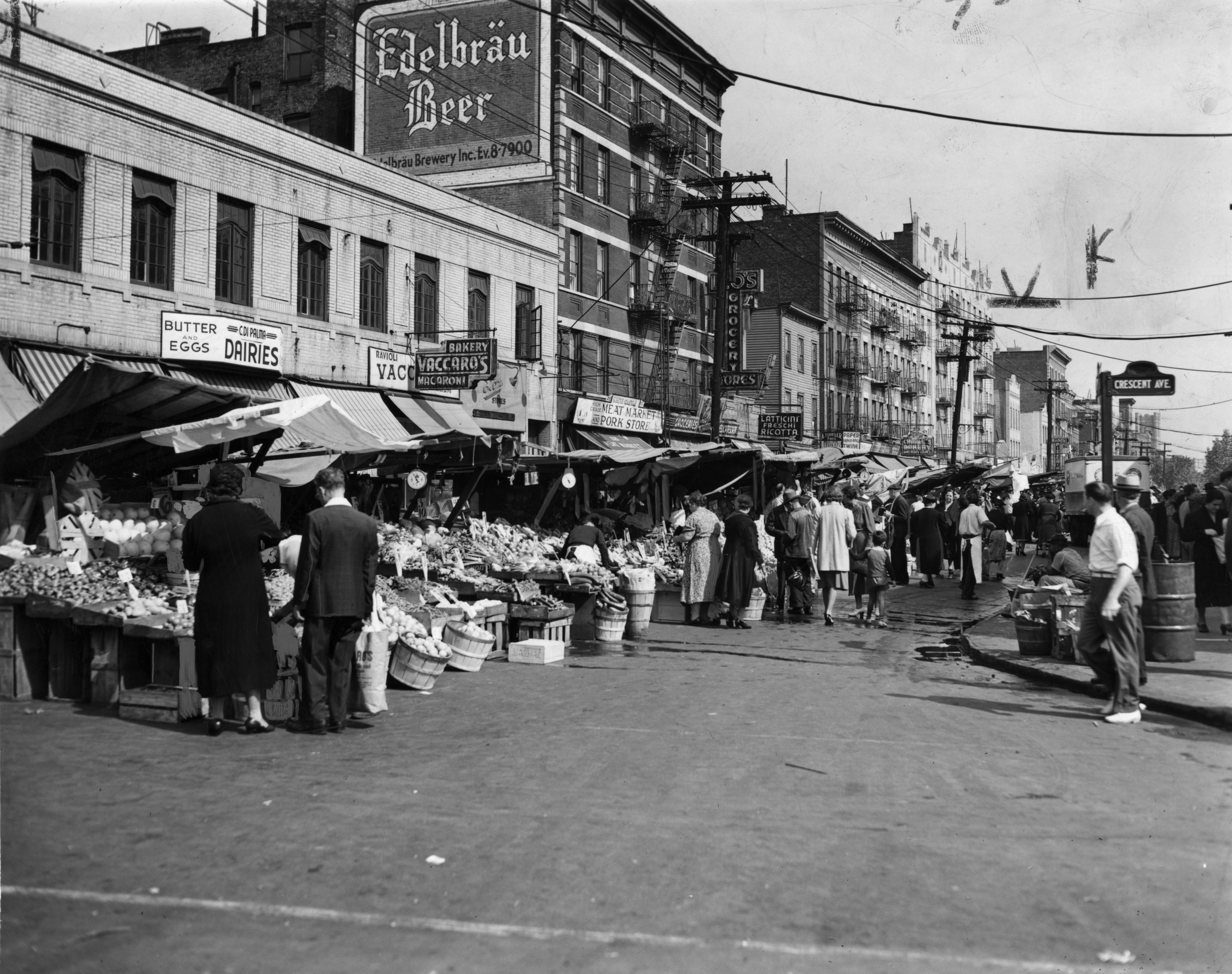
Arthur Avenue in 1940

In the mid-1880s, a large number of Irish and German immigrants began moving into the neighborhood, and its population became very dense after the construction of the Third Avenue El.

With the construction of the Bronx Zoo and the Jerome Park Reservoir at the turn of the 20th century, a large wave of Italian immigrants moved into the area, and Belmont was soon considered the "Little Italy of the Bronx". This "Little Italy" was centered at Arthur Avenue and East 187th Street; although its historical and commercial center is Arthur Avenue itself. It stretches across East 187th Street from Arthur Avenue to Prospect Avenue, and is lined with delis, bakeries, cafés, and Italian merchants. The neighborhood continues to hold an annual Ferragosto celebration on Arthur Avenue each September.

Like many other New York City neighborhoods, Belmont became disenfranchised starting in the mid-20th century. The city dismantled the Third Ave Elevated in 1973, further accelerating its decline. Housing stock was lost to arson, some of it razed by the city in the late 1970s and 1980s.

Starting in the mid-1990s, the neighborhood has experienced a construction and restoration boom, and has maintained its reputation as a thriving business area due to its abundant shops, restaurants, bakeries, delis and markets. It also retains its reputation as the Bronx's "Little Italy" despite its smaller Italian population (prior to the millennium, over 50% of its residents were Italian or of Italian descent), and it is often cited as New York City's "real Little Italy" compared to the Little Italy of Manhattan. Albanians and Puerto Ricans have added to the mixture of businesses on Arthur Avenue and East 187th Street, but the Italian presence is felt with a number of long-established Italian-owned small businesses.

== Demographics ==
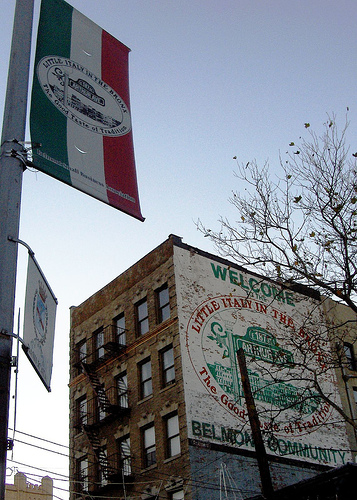
Streetscape of Belmont

Belmont's residents are a diverse mix of races, ethnicities, religious affiliations and national origins. Traditionally the Italian heart of the Bronx, it now also has a significant population of Hispanic and Latino Americans, Albanians, long-standing Italians, and more recent Italian immigrants. Many Mexican families have also moved there, and Belmont hosts the annual Bronx Cinco de Mayo Celebration. As of the 2010 census, Hispanics and Latinos make up the neighborhood's largest ethnic group and form a majority.

Like most New York City neighborhoods, the vast majority of households are occupied by renters. Almost half the population lives below the federal poverty line and receives public assistance (Temporary Assistance for Needy Families, Supplemental Security Income, and Medicaid). However, there is significant income diversity on a block-by-block basis. Belmont is also home to a large population of students at Fordham University who reside in the university's off-campus housing and in private apartment buildings.

Based on data from the 2010 United States census, the population of Belmont was 27,378, an increase of 1,411 (5.4%) from the 25,967 counted in 2000. Covering an area of 313.34 acres (126.80 ha), the neighborhood had a population density of 87.4 inhabitants per acre (55,900/sq mi; 21,600/km^{2}). The racial makeup of the neighborhood was 19.7% (5,381) White, 18.5% (5,059) African American, 0.1% (38) Native American, 2.3% (620) Asian, 0.1% (18) Pacific Islander, 0.3% (84) from other races, and 0.9% (249) from two or more races. Hispanic or Latino of any race were 58.2% (15,929) of the population.

The entirety of Community District 6, which comprises Belmont and East Tremont, had 87,476 inhabitants as of NYC Health's 2018 Community Health Profile, with an average life expectancy of 77.7 years. This is lower than the median life expectancy of 81.2 for all New York City neighborhoods. Most inhabitants are youth and middle-aged adults: 29% are between the ages of between 0–17, 28% between 25 and 44, and 20% between 45 and 64. The ratio of college-aged and elderly residents was lower, at 14% and 9% respectively.

As of 2017, the median household income in Community Districts 3 and 6, including Crotona Park East and Morrisania, was $25,972. In 2018, an estimated 31% of Belmont and East Tremont residents lived in poverty, compared to 25% in all of the Bronx and 20% in all of New York City. One in six residents (16%) were unemployed, compared to 13% in the Bronx and 9% in New York City. Rent burden, or the percentage of residents who have difficulty paying their rent, is 60% in Belmont and East Tremont, compared to the boroughwide and citywide rates of 58% and 51% respectively. Based on this calculation, as of 2018, Belmont and East Tremont are gentrifying.

== Land use and terrain ==
Belmont is dominated by 5- and 6-story elevator and walk-up apartment buildings, but its residential streets are lined with a vibrant blend of housing types, including row houses and larger Art Deco and Tudor Style apartment buildings. Most of the neighborhood's architecture dates from before 1939 and exhibits pre-war architecture styles. In the last decade, construction of modern 2- and 3-unit row houses and apartments have increased the proportion of owners to renters.

Belmont's land area is roughly 0.3 square miles (0.78 km^{2}). Its terrain is relatively low-lying and flat.

=== Points of interest ===
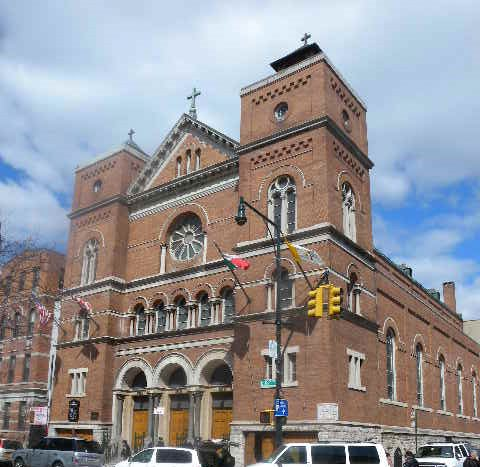
Our Lady of Mount Carmel's Church

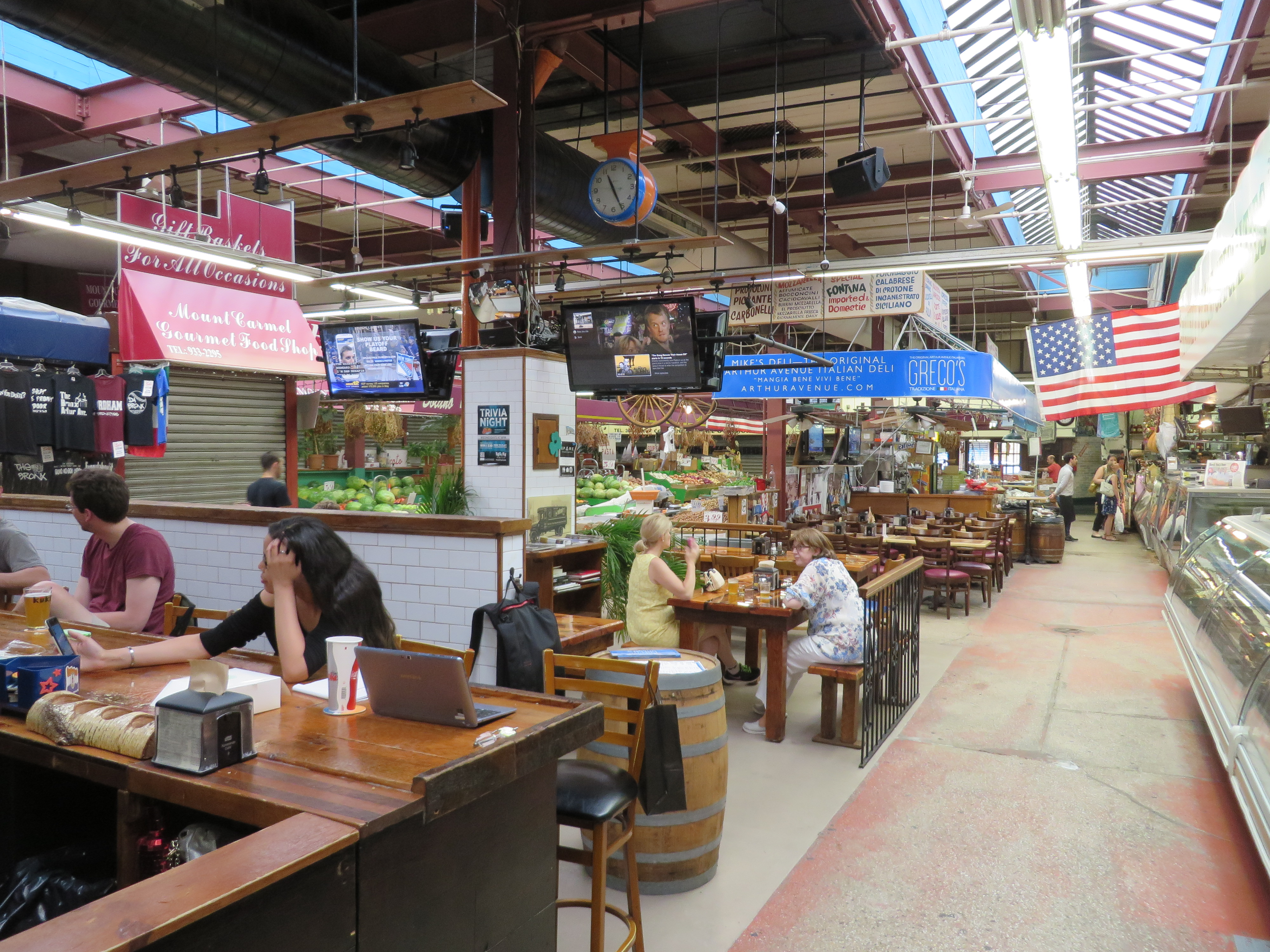
Arthur Avenue retail market

Among the neighborhood's array of Italian restaurants and markets, there are multiple points of interest. Our Lady of Mount Carmel, a Roman Catholic church on E. 187th Street at the corner of Belmont Avenue, was constructed in 1906. The Arthur Avenue Retail Market, which extends the block between Arthur Avenue and Belmont Avenue, features an array of Italian meats, cheeses, and other goods, as well as cigars, a bar, and a dining area.

Parks in the area include the Ciccarone Playground; and the D'Auria Murphy Triangle located at 183rd Avenue, which features a monument to Christopher Columbus. Theodore Roosevelt High School, a large public school, opened in 1918.

The Bronx Zoo and the New York Botanical Garden are also at the northeastern edge of Belmont, attracting worldwide visitors. Adjacent to them is the campus of Fordham University, on Fordham Road at Belmont's northern boundary. A private Roman Catholic university originally established as St. John's College in 1841, it features Collegiate Gothic architecture and is frequently listed among America's most scenic campuses. It has been used as a filming location for many movies, including A Beautiful Mind, Center Stage and The Exorcist.

== Police and crime ==
Belmont and East Tremont are patrolled by the 48th Precinct of the NYPD, located at 450 Cross Bronx Expressway. The 48th Precinct ranked 56th safest out of 69 patrol areas for per-capita crime in 2010. As of 2018, with a non-fatal assault rate of 152 per 100,000 people, Belmont and East Tremont's rate of violent crimes per capita is greater than that of the city as a whole. The incarceration rate of 1,015 per 100,000 people is higher than that of the city as a whole.

The 48th Precinct has a lower crime rate than in the 1990s, with crimes across all categories having decreased by 60.9% between 1990 and 2022. The precinct reported 14 murders, 26 rapes, 447 robberies, 646 felony assaults, 252 burglaries, 467 grand larcenies, and 304 grand larcenies auto in 2022.

== Fire safety ==
Belmont contains two New York City Fire Department (FDNY) fire stations. Engine Co. 48/Ladder Co. 56/Division 7 is located at 2417 Webster Avenue, while Engine Co. 88/Ladder Co. 38 is located at 2223 Belmont Avenue.

== Health ==
As of 2018, preterm births and births to teenage mothers are more common in Belmont and East Tremont than in other places citywide. In Belmont and East Tremont, there were 113 preterm births per 1,000 live births (compared to 87 per 1,000 citywide), and 30.4 births to teenage mothers per 1,000 live births (compared to 19.3 per 1,000 citywide). Belmont and East Tremont has a relatively average population of residents who are uninsured. In 2018, this population of uninsured residents was estimated to be 12%, equal to the citywide rate of 12%.

The concentration of fine particulate matter, the deadliest type of air pollutant, in Belmont and East Tremont is 0.008 milligrams per cubic metre (8.0×10^{−9} oz/ft^{3}), more than the city average. Sixteen percent of Belmont and East Tremont residents are smokers, which is higher than the city average of 14% of residents being smokers. In Belmont and East Tremont, 36% of residents are obese, 22% are diabetic, and 32% have high blood pressure—compared to the citywide averages of 24%, 11%, and 28% respectively. In addition, 20% of children are obese, compared to the citywide average of 20%.

Eighty-one percent of residents eat some fruits and vegetables every day, which is less than the city's average of 87%. In 2018, 69% of residents described their health as "good", "very good", or "excellent", lower than the city's average of 78%. For every supermarket in Belmont and East Tremont, there are 37 bodegas.

The nearest hospitals are St Barnabas Hospital in Belmont and Bronx-Lebanon Hospital Center in Claremont.

== Post offices and ZIP Code ==
Belmont is covered by the ZIP Code 10458. The United States Postal Service operates two offices nearby: the Fordham Station at 465 East 188th Street, and the Mount Carmel Station at 652 East 187th Street.

== Education ==
Belmont and East Tremont generally have a lower rate of college-educated residents than the rest of the city as of 2018. While 19% of residents age 25 and older have a college education or higher, 36% have less than a high school education and 45% are high school graduates or have some college education. By contrast, 26% of Bronx residents and 43% of city residents have a college education or higher. The percentage of Belmont and East Tremont students excelling in math rose from 19% in 2000 to 44% in 2011, and reading achievement increased from 25% to 30% during the same time period.

Belmont and East Tremont's rate of elementary school student absenteeism is more than the rest of New York City. In Belmont and East Tremont, 35% of elementary school students missed twenty or more days per school year, higher than the citywide average of 20%. Additionally, 61% of high school students in Belmont and East Tremont graduate on time, lower than the citywide average of 75%.

=== Library ===
The New York Public Library operates the Belmont Library and Enrico Fermi Cultural Center, located at 610 East 186th Street. The branch opened in 1981 and contains an extensive collection of Italian-language materials, as well as work by Italians and Italian-Americans.

== Transportation ==
The following MTA Regional Bus Operations bus routes serve Belmont:

- Bx9: to Riverdale or West Farms Square–East Tremont Avenue (2 and 5 trains) via Kingsbridge Road and Broadway
- Bx12 and Bx12 Select Bus Service: to Bay Plaza Shopping Center or Inwood–207th Street (A train) via Fordham Road and Pelham Parkway
- Bx15: to The Hub via 3rd Avenue
- Bx17: to Port Morris via Prospect and Crotona Avenues
- Bx19: to Riverbank State Park via Southern Blvd and 149th Street
- Bx22: to Bronx High School of Science or Castle Hill via Castle Hill Avenue

Belmont is also served by the following Bee-Line Bus System routes to Westchester County, New York:

- BL60: to Fordham Plaza or White Plains via US Route 1
- BL61: to Fordham Plaza or Port Chester via US Route 1
- BL62 Express: to Fordham (Valentine Avenue) or White Plains via US Route 1

Railroad service is provided by Metro-North's Harlem Line and New Haven Line at Fordham station. The closest New York City Subway station is about a mile west of Belmont, at Fordham Road, which is served by the B and D trains.

== Notable people ==
- Anne Bancroft (1931–2005), actress, born and raised in Belmont
- Don DeLillo (born 1936), author, raised in Belmont
- Lana Del Rey (born 1985), singer, lived in Belmont while in college
- Dion DiMucci (born 1939), singer, songwriter, and lead vocalist of Dion and the Belmonts, born and raised in Belmont
- Philip Foglia (1950–2020), prosecutor, lawyer, and Italian American rights activist
- Lesandro Guzman-Feliz (2002–2018), teenager who was killed by members of the Dominican gang Trinitarios.
- Christine Jorgensen (1926–1989), actress, first known trans woman to publicly undergo sex reassignment surgery
- Carlo Mastrangelo (1938–2016), vocalist from The Belmonts
- Fred Milano (1939–2012), vocalist from The Belmonts.
- Chazz Palminteri (born 1952), actor, raised in Belmont.

== In popular culture ==
The film A Bronx Tale (1993) starring Robert De Niro was set in the neighborhood and the main character Sonny tells Calogero that he was attending the University of Belmont Avenue. The opening scene of 1955's Marty was shot on Arthur Avenue. Other films with scenes shot on location in Belmont include The Seven-Ups and The Incident. The character of Leonard in James Frey's novel A Million Little Pieces grew up in the neighborhood. The 2019 movie Bottom of the 9th, which stars Joe Manganiello and Sofia Vergara, was filmed throughout the neighborhood, specifically featuring Arthur Avenue. The screenplay for the film was written by Robert Bruzio, who grew up on Arthur Avenue.
