= The Kane Triplets =

- The Kane Triplets with Bill Dana in a promotional photograph for The Ed Sullivan Show (1963)

Background information
- Genre: Pop
- Years active: 1960s-1970s
- Past members: Lucille Kane; Jeanne Kane; Maureen Kane

The Kane Triplets were a pop music group made up of triplets Lucille, Jeanne and Maureen Kane. They are perhaps best known for their recording of the "Theme from Mission: Impossible," which was released in 1968 by United Artists Records with vocals written by Fred Milano and Angelo D'Aleo of The Belmonts.

== Career ==
In 1948, when only a few weeks old, the triplets were featured in an advert in Life magazine. Their singing career began after their performance on Arthur Godfrey's Talent Scouts; they were picked up by The McGuire Sisters and performed alongside them in both theater and television performances. They later performed on The Jack Benny Show, The Ed Sullivan Show, The Mike Douglas Show, The Perry Como Show and The Tonight Show.

On 30 January 2007, Jeanne Kane was murdered by her ex-husband and retired New York City Police Department sergeant John Galtieri. Galtieri, who was (at the time) a manager at Quiznos, was sentenced to 25 years to life imprisonment for shooting Kane in a Staten Island parking lot.
