= A Teenager in Love =

1959 single by Dion and the Belmonts

Single by Dion and the Belmonts
- B-side: "I've Cried Before"
- Released: March 30, 1959
- Genre: Doo-wop
- Length: 2:40
- Label: Laurie
- Songwriters: Doc Pomus, Mort Shuman

Dion and the Belmonts singles chronology
"Don't Pity Me" (1958)	"A Teenager in Love" (1959)	"Every Little Thing I Do" (1959)

"A Teenager in Love" is a song written by Doc Pomus and partner Mort Shuman. It was originally recorded by Dion and the Belmonts, and released in March 1959. It appeared on their album Presenting Dion and the Belmonts (1959). It reached No. 5 on the Billboard Hot 100 chart.

The song was covered by many different artists. In 1959, three different versions of the song charted simultaneously in the UK, the other two versions being by Marty Wilde and Craig Douglas, which reached No. 2 and No. 13 respectively on the British chart.

== Background ==
The song was written by the songwriting duo Doc Pomus and Mort Shuman commissioned by Laurie Records, originally intended for the doo-wop singing group The Mystics. Laurie Records, however, gave the song to Dion & The Belmonts instead to record, and Pomus and Shuman then quickly wrote another song, "Hushabye" for the Mystics. Dion initially thought the song sounded "wimpy", but then realized the sound the song has when the Belmonts started singing "ooh-wah" at the start of the song. "A Teenager in Love" was released with "I've Cried Before" its B-side in April 1959, and peaked at No. 5 in May.

The song has appeared on multiple "best of" compilation albums by Dion and the Belmonts.

== Charts ==
Chart (1959)	Peak position
Canada (CHUM Hit Parade)	2
UK Singles (OCC)	28
US Billboard Hot 100	5

== Parodies and cover versions ==
The Fugs parodied "A Teenager In Love" as "Septuagenarian in Love" on The Fugs Final CD Part 1. This version turns the teenager into a senior citizen who is having trouble getting an erection.

The Four Preps parodied the song in "More Money for You and Me".

A cover version of the song appears in the video game Rayman Raving Rabbids 2 and on the game's Wii Disc Channel screen.

In Season 1 of The Muppet Show, singer Connie Stevens performed a cover backed by the Muppet Monster group The Mutations.
