= Dion DiMucci discography =

This is the discography for American musician Dion DiMucci (including Dion and the Belmonts).

Dion is a singer and songwriter whose music has incorporated elements of doo-wop, rock, R&B and blues. As lead singer of Dion and the Belmonts, then a solo career, he was one of the most popular rock and roll performers of the pre-British Invasion era. He had 39 Top 40 hits in the late 1950s and early 1960s as a solo performer, with the Belmonts or with the Del-Satins. He is best known for the singles "Runaround Sue", "The Wanderer", "Ruby Baby" and "Lovers Who Wander", among other hits.

In the late 1960s, Dion shifted his style and released songs that were more mature and contemplative, such as "Abraham, Martin and John". During the 1980s, Dion produced several Christian albums, earning a GMA Dove Award nomination in 1984 for the album I Put Away My Idols. He returned to secular music in the late 1980s with Yo Frankie (1989). Between the mid-2000s and 2024, Dion released seven Top Blues Albums (three at No. 1). Critics who had dismissed his early work, labeling him a teen idol, praised his later work and noted the influence he has had on other musicians.

A Grammy-nominated artist, Dion has released over 40 albums, and scored eleven Top 10 hits (including with the Belmonts) on the Billboard Hot 100 chart. He was inducted into the Rock and Roll Hall of Fame in 1989. In 2002, Dion was inducted into the Grammy Hall of Fame for "Runaround Sue". AllMusic album awards include: Favorite Blues Album for New York is My Home (2016), Favorite Compilations and Reissues for Kickin Child: Lost Columbia Album 1965 (2017) and Favorite Blues Album for Blues with Friends (2020).

== Studio albums ==
=== Dion and the Belmonts ===
Title	Album details	Peak chart positions
Title	Album details	US
Presenting Dion and the Belmonts	Released: November 12, 1959; Label: Laurie Records	—
Wish Upon a Star with Dion and the Belmonts	Released: June 1960; Label: Laurie Records	—
Together Again	Released: January 1967; Label: ABC Records	—
Live at Madison Square Garden 1972	Released: 1973; Label: Warner Bros. Records	144

=== Dion ===
Title	Album details	Peak chart positions				
Title	Album details	US	US Christ.	US Blues	US Indie	UK
Alone with Dion	Released: 1961; Label: Laurie Records	—	—	—	—	—
Runaround Sue	Released: 1961; Label: Laurie Records	11	—	—	—	—
Lovers Who Wander	Released: 1962; Label: Laurie Records	12	—	—	—	—
Ruby Baby	Released: 1963; Label: Columbia Records	20	—	—	—	—
Donna the Prima Donna	Released: 1963; Label: Columbia Records	—	—	—	—	—
Dion	Released: 1968; Label: Laurie Records	128	—	—	—	—
Wonder Where I'm Bound	Released: 1969; Label: Columbia Records	—	—	—	—	—
Sit Down Old Friend	Released: 1970; Label: Warner Bros. Records	—	—	—	—	—
You're Not Alone	Released: 1971; Label: Warner Bros. Records	—	—	—	—	—
Sanctuary	Released: 1971; Label: Warner Bros. Records	200	—	—	—	—
Suite for Late Summer	Released: 1972; Label: Warner Bros. Records	197	—	—	—	—
Born to Be with You	Released: 1975; Label: Phil Spector International Records	—	—	—	—	—
Streetheart	Released: 1976; Label: Warner Bros. Records	—	—	—	—	—
Return of the Wanderer	Released: 1978; Label: Lifesong Records	—	—	—	—	—
Inside Job	Released: January 1980; Label: DaySpring Records	—	—	—	—	—
Only Jesus	Released: September 1981; Label: DaySpring Records	—	—	—	—	—
I Put Away My Idols	Released: September 1983; Label: DaySpring Records	—	37	–	—	—
Seasons	Released: September 4, 1984; Label: DaySpring Records	—	—	—	—	—
Kingdom in the Streets	Released: June 1985; Label: Myrrh Records	—	—	—	—	—
Velvet & Steel	Released: September 1986; Label: DaySpring Records	—	—	—	—	—
Yo Frankie	Released: May 12, 1989; Label: Arista Records	130	—	—	—	—
Fire in the Night	Released: 1990; Label: Ace Records	—	—	—	—	—
Dream on Fire	Released: September 1992; Label: Visionary Records	—	—	—	—	—
Rock N' Roll Christmas	Released: September 14, 1993; Label: The Right Stuff Records	—	—	—	—	—
Déjà Nu	Released: May 23, 2000; Label: Ace Records	—	—	—	—	—
New Masters	Released: September 30, 2003; Label: Collectables Records	—	—	—	—	—
Bronx in Blue	Released: February 14, 2006; Label: Verve Forecast Records	—	—	2	—	—
Son of Skip James	Released: August 28, 2007; Label: Verve Forecast Records	—	—	4	—	—
Heroes: Giants of Early Guitar Rock	Released: August 26, 2008; Label: Saguaro Roads Records	—	—	—	—	—
Tank Full of Blues	Released: January 24, 2012; Label: Blue Horizon	—	—	3	42	—
New York Is My Home	Released: February 12, 2016; Label: Instant Records	—	—	3	29	—
Kickin Child: Lost Columbia Album 1965	Released: May 12, 2017; Label: Norton Records	—	—	—	—	—
Blues with Friends	Released: June 5, 2020; Label: KTBA Records	—	—	1	31	52
Stomping Ground	Released: November 19, 2021; Label: KTBA Records	—	—	1	—	—
Girl Friends	Released: March 8, 2024; Label: KTBA Records	—	—	1	—	—
The Rock 'N' Roll Philosopher	Released: October 24, 2025; Label: KTBA Records	—	—	—	—	—

Dion released videos for every single from Blues with Friends, Stomping Ground and Girl Friends via social media.

Dion also produced music videos for songs from The Rock 'N' Roll Philosopher via KTBA Records and social media.

== Compilation albums ==
Title	Album details	Peak chart positions
Title	Album details	US
Dion Sings His Greatest Hits	Released: 1962; Label: Laurie Records	29
Love Came to Me	Released: 1963; Label: Laurie Records	—
Dion Sings to Sandy	Released: 1963; Label: Laurie Records	115
More of Dion's Greatest Hits	Released: 1964; Label: Laurie Records	—
Dion's Greatest Hits	Released: 1973; Label: Columbia Records	194
Everything You Always Wanted to Hear by Dion and the Belmonts But Couldn't Get	Released: 1976; Label: Laurie Records	—
Bronx Blues: The Columbia Recordings (1962-1965)	Released: 1991; Label: Columbia Records	—
The Road I'm On: A Retrospective	Released: 1997; Label: Columbia/Legacy	—
The Best of the Gospel Years	Released: 1997; Label: Ace Records	—

== Singles ==
=== Dion and the Belmonts ===
Year	Titles (A-side, B-side) Both sides from same album except where indicated	US record label and number	Peak chart positions				Album
Year	Titles (A-side, B-side) Both sides from same album except where indicated	US record label and number	US	US AC	UK	US R&B	Album
1957	"Santa Margarita" b/w "Teenage Clementine"	Mohawk 106	—	—	—	—	non-album tracks
1957	"Tag Along" b/w "We Went Away"	Mohawk 107	—	—	—	—	non-album tracks
1958	"I Wonder Why" b/w "Teen Angel" (from Dion Sings His Greatest Hits)	Laurie 3013	22	—	—	—	Presenting Dion and the Belmonts
1958	"No One Knows" b/w "I Can't Go On (Rosalie)" (from Together)	Laurie 3015	19	—	—	12	Presenting Dion and the Belmonts
1958	"Don't Pity Me" b/w "Just You"	Laurie 3021	40	—	—	—	Presenting Dion and the Belmonts
1959	"A Teenager in Love" b/w "I've Cried Before"	Laurie 3027	5	—	28	—	Presenting Dion and the Belmonts
1959	"A Lover's Prayer"	Laurie 3035	73	—	—	—	Wish Upon a Star with Dion and the Belmonts
1959	"Every Little Thing I Do"	Laurie 3035	48	—	—	—	Together
1960	"Where or When" b/w "That's My Desire"	Laurie 3044	3	—	—	19	Presenting Dion and the Belmonts
1960	"When You Wish Upon a Star" b/w "Wonderful Girl" (from Presenting Dion and the Belmonts)	Laurie 3052	30	—	—	—	Wish Upon a Star with Dion and the Belmonts
1960	"In the Still of the Night" b/w "A Funny Feeling" (from Presenting Dion and the Belmonts)	Laurie 3059	38	—	—	—	Wish Upon a Star with Dion and the Belmonts
1966	"Berimbau" b/w "My Girl the Month of May"	ABC 10868	—	—	—	—	Together Again
1967	"For Bobbie" b/w "Movin' Man"	ABC 10896	—	—	—	—	Together Again
"—" denotes a recording that did not chart or was not released in that territory.

=== Dion ===
Year	Titles (A-side, B-side) Both sides from same album except where indicated	US record label and number	Peak chart positions				Certifications	Album
Year	Titles (A-side, B-side) Both sides from same album except where indicated	US record label and number	US	US AC	UK	US R&B	Certifications	Album
1960	"Lonely Teenager" b/w "Little Miss Blue"	Laurie 3070	12	—	47	—		Alone with Dion
1961	"Havin' Fun" b/w "North East End of the Corner"	Laurie 3081	42	—	—	—		Alone with Dion
1961	"Kissin' Game" b/w "Heaven Help Me"	Laurie 3090	82	—	—	—		Love Came to Me
1961	"Somebody Nobody Wants" b/w "Could Somebody Take My Place Tonight" (from Love Came to Me)	Laurie 3101	103	—	—	—		Runaround Sue
1961	"Runaround Sue" b/w "Runaway Girl"	Laurie 3110	1	—	11	4	BPI: Silver; RMNZ: Platinum	Runaround Sue
1961	"The Wanderer"	Laurie 3115	2	—	10	—	BPI: Silver; RMNZ: Gold	Runaround Sue
1961	"The Majestic"	Laurie 3115	36	—	—	—		Runaround Sue
1962	"Lovers Who Wander"	Laurie 3123	3	—	—	16		Lovers Who Wander
1962	"(I Was) Born to Cry"	Laurie 3123	42	—	—	—		Lovers Who Wander
1962	"Little Diane" b/w "Lost for Sure"	Laurie 3134	8	—	—	—		Lovers Who Wander
1962	"Love Came to Me" b/w "Little Girl"	Laurie 3145	10	—	—	24		Love Came to Me
1962	"Ruby Baby" b/w "He'll Only Hurt You"	Columbia 42662	2	—	—	5		Ruby Baby
1963	"Sandy" b/w "Faith" (from Together)	Laurie 3153	21	—	—	—		Dion Sings to Sandy
1963	"This Little Girl" b/w "The Loneliest Man in the World" (from Ruby Baby)	Columbia 42776	21	—	—	—		Donna the Prima Donna
1963	"Come Go with Me" b/w "King Without a Queen"	Laurie 3171	48	—	—	—		Lovers Who Wander
1963	"Be Careful of Stones that You Throw" b/w "I Can't Believe (That You Don't Love Me Anymore)"	Columbia 42810	31	13	—	—		Donna the Prima Donna
1963	"Lonely World" b/w "Tag Along" (non-album track)	Laurie 3187	101	—	—	—		More of Dion's Greatest Hits
1963	"Donna the Prima Donna" b/w "You're Mine"	Columbia 42852	6	—	—	17		Donna the Prima Donna
1963	"Drip Drop" b/w "No One's Waiting for Me"	Columbia 42917	6	—	—	—		non-album tracks
1964	"Then I'll Be Tired of You" b/w "After the Dance"	Laurie 3225	—	—	—	—		Alone with Dion
1964	"I'm Your Hoochie Coochie Man" b/w "The Road I'm On (Gloria)"	Columbia 42977	113	—	—	—		non-album tracks
1964	"Shout" b/w "Little Girl" (from Love Came to Me)	Laurie 3240	108	—	—	—		Lovers Who Wander
1964	"Johnny B. Goode" b/w "Chicago Blues"	Columbia 43096	71	—	—	—		non-album tracks
1965	"Unloved, Unwanted Me" b/w "Sweet, Sweet, Baby" (from Donna the Prima Donna)	Columbia 43213	—	—	—	—		Ruby Baby
1965	"Kickin' Child" b/w "Spoonful"	Columbia 43293	—	—	—	—		non-album tracks
1965	"Tomorrow Won't Bring the Rain" b/w "You Move Me Babe"	Columbia 43423	—	—	—	—		non-album tracks
1965	"I Got the Blues" b/w "(I Was) Born to Cry" (from Lovers Who Wander)	Laurie 3303	—	—	—	—		non-album tracks
1966	"Time in My Heart for You" b/w "Wake Up Baby"	Columbia 43483	—	—	—	—		non-album tracks
1966	"Two Ton Feather" b/w "So Much Younger"	Columbia 43692	—	—	—	—		non-album tracks
1968	"Abraham, Martin and John" b/w "Daddy Rollin' (In Your Arms)" (non-album track)	Laurie 3464	4	8	—	—	RIAA: Gold	Dion
1968	"Purple Haze" b/w "The Dolphins"	Laurie 3478	63	—	—	—		Dion
1969	"I Can't Help But Wonder Where I'm Bound" b/w "Southern Train"	Columbia 44719	—	—	—	—		Wonder Where I'm Bound
1969	"From Both Sides Now" b/w "Sun Fun Song"	Laurie 3495	91	—	—	—		Dion
1969	"He Looks a Lot Like Me" b/w "Loving You Is Sweeter Than Ever"	Laurie 3504	—	—	—	—		Dion
1969	"If We Only Have Love" b/w "Natural Man"	Warner Bros. 7356	—	—	—	—		Sit Down Old Friend
1970	"Your Own Back Yard" b/w "Sit Down Old Friend" (from Sit Down Old Friend)	Warner Bros. 7401	75	—	—	—		Born to Be with You
1971	"Close to It All" b/w "Let It Be"	Warner Bros. 7469	—	—	—	—		You're Not Alone
1971	"Sunniland" b/w "Josie"	Warner Bros. 7491	—	—	—	—		You're Not Alone
1971	"Sanctuary" b/w "Brand New Morning"	Warner Bros. 7537	103	—	—	—		Sanctuary
1972	"Running Close Behind You" b/w "Sea Gull"	Warner Bros. 7663	—	—	—	—		Suite for Late Summer
1973	"Doctor Rock and Roll" b/w "Sunshine Lady" (from Sanctuary)	Warner Bros. 7704	—	—	—	—		non-album track
1974	"New York City Song" b/w "Richer Than a Rich Man" (non-album track)	Warner Bros. 7793	—	—	—	—		Born to Be with You
1975	"Make the Woman Love Me" b/w "Running Close Behind You" (from Suite for Late Summer)	Warner/Spector 0403	—	—	—	—		Born to Be with You
1975	"Born to Be with You" b/w "Good Lovin' Man"	Big Tree/Spector 16063	108	—	—	—		Born to Be with You
1976	"The Wanderer" b/w "Little Diane"	Philips 6146 700 (UK)	—	—	16	—		Dion's Greatest Hits (UK)
1976	"Hey My Love" b/w "Lover Boy Supreme"	Warner Bros. 8234	—	—	—	—		Streetheart
1976	"The Way You Do the Things You Do" b/w "Lover Boy Supreme"	Warner Bros. 8258	—	—	—	—		Streetheart
1976	"Queen of '59" b/w "Oh the Night"	Warner Bros. 8293	—	—	—	—		Streetheart
1977	"Young Virgin Eyes (I'm All Wrapped Up)" b/w "Oh the Night" (from Streetheart)	Warner Bros. 8406	—	—	—	—		non-album track
1978	"Heart of Saturday Night" b/w "You've Awakened Something in Me"	Lifesong 1765	—	—	—	—		Return of the Wanderer
1978	"Midtown American Main Street Gang" b/w "Guitar Queen"	Lifesong 1770	—	—	—	—		Return of the Wanderer
1978	"(I Used to Be a) Brooklyn Dodger" b/w "Streetheart Theme"	Lifesong 1785	—	—	—	—		Return of the Wanderer
1980	"Fire in the Night" b/w "Street Mama"	Lifesong 45082	—	—	—	—		non-album tracks
1980	"Sweet Surrender" B-side unknown	Dayspring 618	—	—	—	—		Inside Job
1981	"The Best" B-side unknown	Dayspring 622	—	—	—	—		Only Jesus
1983	"Day of the Lord" B-side unknown	Dayspring 632	—	—	—	—		I Put Away My Idols
1983	"I Put Away My Idols" B-side unknown	Dayspring 633	—	—	—	—		I Put Away My Idols
1984	"Golden Sun, Silver Moon" B-side unknown	Dayspring 9016294155	—	—	—	—		Seasons
1985	"Still in the Spirit" B-side unknown	Myrrh 9016382151	—	—	—	—		Kingdom in the Streets
1986	"Simple Ironies" B-side unknown	Dayspring 9016676155	—	—	—	—		Velvet & Steel
1989	"And the Night Stood Still" b/w "Tower of Love"	Arista 9797	75	16	—	—		Yo Frankie
1989	"King of the New York Streets" b/w "The Wanderer" (non-album track)	Arista 662556	—	—	74	—		Yo Frankie
1989	"Written on the Subway Wall"/"Little Star" (with Paul Simon) "King of the New York Streets" b/w "And the Night Stood Still"/"Tower of Love"	Arista 662910	—	—	97	—		Yo Frankie
1990	"Sea Cruise" (from The Adventures of Ford Fairlane) CD single	Elektra 8191	—	28	—	—		The Adventures of Ford Fairlane (soundtrack)
1993	"Christmas (Baby Please Come Home)" b/w "Jingle Bell Rock"	The Right Stuff 17651	—	—	—	—		Rock 'n Roll Christmas
1997	"Please Come Home for Christmas" b/w "Wintertime" (non-album track)	The Right Stuff 19769	—	—	—	—		Rock 'n Roll Christmas
2015	"New York Is My Home" (with Paul Simon)	Blue Horizon	—	—	—	—		New York Is My Home
2020	"Song for Sam Cooke (Here in America)" (with Paul Simon)	KTBA Records	—	—	—	—		Blues with Friends
2020	"Blues Comin' On" (with Joe Bonamassa)	KTBA Records	—	—	—	—		Blues with Friends
2021	"Angel in the Alleyways" (with Patti Scialfa and Bruce Springsteen)	KTBA Records	—	—	—	—		Stomping Ground
2024	"An American Hero" (with Carlene Carter)	KTBA Records	—	—	—	—		Girl Friends
2025	"New York Minute"	KTBA Records	—	—	—	—		The Rock 'N' Roll Philosopher
"—" denotes a recording that did not chart or was not released in that territory.

"Hello Christmas" (with Amy Grant) and "You Know It's Christmas" (with Joe Bonamassa) were released in 2020.

A new version of Dion's song "Abraham, Martin and John" was released on The Rock 'N' Roll Philosopher in October 2025.

=== Billboard Year-End performances ===
==== Dion and the Belmonts ====
Year	Song	Year-End position
1959	"A Teenager in Love"	25
1960	"Where or When"	21

==== Dion ====
Year	Song	Year-End position
1961	"Runaround Sue"	46
1962	"The Wanderer"	12
1962	"Lovers Who Wander"	67
1962	"Little Diane"	86
1963	"Ruby Baby"	32
1963	"Donna the Prima Donna"	76
