= The Del-Satins =

American doo-wop group

- Origin: Manhattan, New York City, United States
- Genres: Doowop, pop
- Years active: 1958–1968; 1991-1999; 2011
- Labels: Laurie, Columbia, B. T. Puppy, Diamond
- Past members: Stan Zizka; Fred Ferrara †; Tom Ferrara; Leslie Cauchi †; Keith Koestner; Bobby Failla; Richie Greene; Johnny Maestro †; Johnny Fielder; Mike Gregorio; Charlie Aiello; Art Loria; Edye VanBuren

The Del-Satins were an American vocal group, most active in the early 1960s, who recorded on their own but are best remembered for their harmonies on hit records for Dion and others. They have been described as having "few peers as practitioners of white doo-wop."

== History ==
The group was formed in 1958 in Manhattan, New York, through a merger of two existing street corner groups, the Yorkville Melodies and the Jokers. The original members were teenagers Stan Zizka (lead), Fred Ferrara (baritone), his brother Tom Ferrara (bass), Leslie Cauchi (first tenor), and Keith Koestner (second tenor). They chose the name Del-Satins as a tribute to The Dells and The Five Satins, and built a solid following with their live performances, coming first in a prestigious New York citywide "Battle of the Groups". Koestner left before their first recording session, to join the US Army, and was replaced by Bobby Failla, later replaced in turn by Richie Greene.

In 1960 they recorded their debut single, "I'll Pray for You", for George Goldner's small independent End label, before acquiring a new manager, Laurie Gribble, and signing for Laurie Records. There they joined forces with Dion, who had left his previous group Dion and The Belmonts to pursue a solo career. He hooked up with The Del-Satins after making some solo recordings with mixed success. The Del-Satins were instantly sent to work on his new song, "Runaround Sue", which then rose to number 1 in the Billboard charts. Although their contribution to the hit was substantial, the Del-Satins received no credit. They also sang on Dion's later solo hits, "The Wanderer", "Lovers Who Wander", "Little Diane", "Love Came to Me", "Ruby Baby", "Donna the Prima Donna", "Drip Drop", and "Sandy", as well as on records by Len Barry and Dean and Jean. They also provided backing vocals on Ernie Maresca's self-penned 1962 hit, "Shout! Shout! (Knock Yourself Out)".

They released a number of singles under their own name, but had little success until "Teardrops Follow Me" in 1962, after which they found regular work on television and radio, with Alan Freed among others. They then moved to Columbia Records as part of Dion's new contract, and Dion produced their first single for the label, "Feelin' No Pain". Still frustrated by their lack of recognition, in 1963 they auditioned for Phil Spector but declined his subsequent invitation to record with him. The group featured regularly on Clay Cole's weekly TV shows from 1963 to 1965, and worked as backing vocalists for other singers. As Dion's solo career ran into the commercial doldrums in the mid-1960s, the group moved on to Mala Records and then B.T. Puppy Records, where they released an album, Out to Lunch.

Zizka left the Del-Satins in the mid-1960s (later using the name Steve Sommers), and Cauchi and Tom Ferrara were drafted. The remaining original member of the Del-Satins, Fred Ferrara, continued to play live with the addition of Johnny Maestro (former lead singer of The Crests), Johnny Fielder, Richard Greene, and Mike Gregorio, and continued to make occasional recordings. One of their unsuccessful singles, "Love-Hate-Revenge" (issued on the Diamond label), was covered by Episode Six. When Cauchi returned, the Del-Satins merged with The Rhythm Method from Long Island in 1968 to form The Brooklyn Bridge. Richard Greene died in the early 1970s.

By the early 1990s, Fred Ferrara and Les Cauchi remained with the Brooklyn Bridge, while Tom Ferrara was a member of The Capris. In 1991, Stan Zizka formed a new version of the Del-Satins for nostalgia shows, and recorded an album, Still Wandering. Zizka then formed his own band, Tangerine, before re-forming the Del-Satins with Charlie Aiello, Art Loria and Edye VanBuren in 1993. The group appeared regularly on the oldies circuit, and the album was sold at performances. The group also recorded four new Christmas tracks in 1997. After 1999, Zizka continued to perform occasionally with new line-ups of the Del-Satins, as well as with Tangerine and The Magnificent Men.

In May 2011, Stan Zizka, Les Cauchi, Fred Ferrara and Tom Ferrara reunited for two concerts, one in the Yorkville neighborhood of Manhattan, and the second one on Long Island. They also performed occasionally with the Brooklyn Bridge and the Capris, the three groups having overlapping personnel. Fred Ferrara died, aged 71, on October 21, 2011, putting an end to reunions of the original group. Leslie Cauchi died, aged 77, on March 3, 2020.
