= Lovers Who Wander =

Lovers Who Wander may refer to:

- Lovers Who Wander (song), a 1962 song by Dion
- Lovers Who Wander (Dion album), 1962
- Lovers Who Wander (The Del-Lords album), 1990
