= Bobby Susser =

American songwriter and record producer (1942–2020)

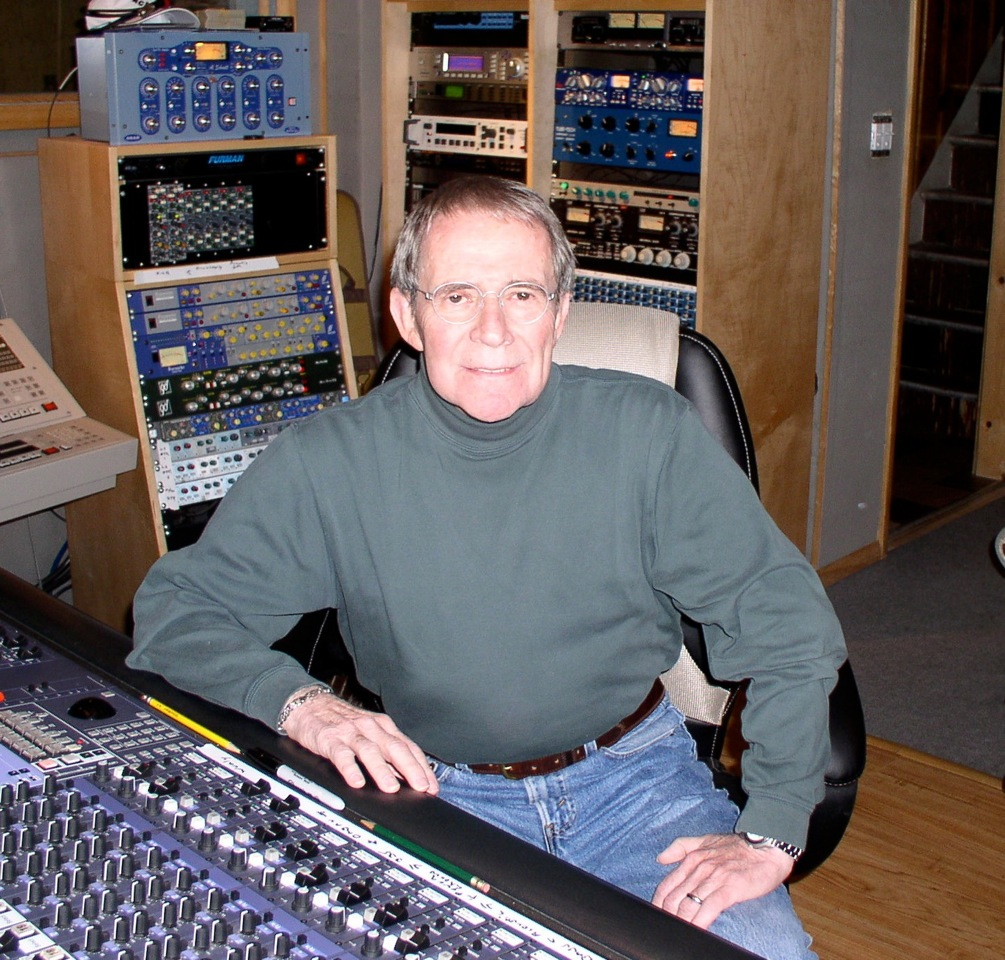
- Susser in 2017

Background information
- Born: Robert Howard Susser; July 18, 1942; New York City, U.S.
- Died: September 15, 2020 (aged 78)
- Genres: Children's music, rhythm and blues, novelty songs, pop music
- Occupations: Songwriter, record producer, performer
- Instruments: Guitar
- Years active: 1962–2020
- Labels: Amy Records, United Artists Records, Veep Records, Laurie Records, Susser Records, New Hope Records, Smithsonian Folkways, The Bobby Susser Music Group, Inc.
- Website: www.bobbysusser.com

Robert Howard Susser (July 18, 1942 – September 15, 2020) was an American songwriter, record producer, and performer, best known for his young children's music. Among some of his several honors, he is the recipient of the "Distinguished Alumni Award" for his life's work, awarded from Teachers College, Columbia University. Susser has sold over 5 million children's albums.

== Biography ==
=== Early life ===
Born in New York City, to middle class Jewish American parents, (His father, of German descent, was a factory supervisor, while his mother, of Hungarian descent, was a housewife), in the borough of Manhattan, Susser grew up in the borough of Queens, and attended Jamaica High School. He was a baseball pitcher and was honored by New York City as its "Most Valuable Player" within The New York City Baseball Federation League, 1957. During his high school years, he wrote songs for some of his favorite artists, such as Dion and The Drifters. But, at the time, all of his attempts to reach these artists were unsuccessful. Four decades later, in 1998, Ben E. King, lead singer of the Drifters, recorded a collection of Susser's children's songs titled, "I Have Songs In My Pocket". Susser graduated from Queens College, City University of New York, magna cum laude, with a Bachelor of Arts degree in communications. He received a Master's degree in communications in early childhood education from Teachers College, Columbia University, where he studied with Canadian scholar, and communication theorist, Marshall McLuhan. In 1961 he received an honorable discharge for serving in the United States Army.

=== 1960s and 1970s ===
After producing four singles in 1961, and 1962 with his childhood friend Paul Simon, for the group Tico and The Triumphs, which included Susser's first Billboard Hot 100 chart record "Motorcycle," on Amy Records, he concentrated on writing and producing rhythm and blues songs. He spent most of his days in New York's Brill Building, attempting to place his songs with music publishers, and receive advance monies, with the hope his songs would be recorded by popular artists. In 1963, he wrote, produced, and sold the master recordings of "Kiss Me Now (Don't Kiss Me Later)" and its B-side "We're Not Old Enough," sung by Florence DeVore, to Phil Spector. The record was the first release on Spector's new Philles Records subsidiary label, Phi-Dan Records. Soon Susser began recording his songs with Panama Francis, Bernard Purdie, Paul Griffin, Bob Bushnell, Al Gorgoni, and Horace Ott.

From 1965 through 1973, he continued to write and produce songs for Florence DeVore, as well as for Sharon Redd, Lily Fields, Mamie Lee, Morgana King, Robert John, and Trini Lopez. While he published most of his new songs, the older ones that he had placed with other music publishers were beginning to get recorded. In 1971 he wrote and produced the controversial song "Once You Understand" on Laurie Records, sung by his own studio group, Think. After being banned from radio stations in several major cities, the anti-drug, novelty song sold 1.4 million records in the United States. The song later was sampled and covered by artists Biz Markie, Acen, 4 Hero, and De La Soul.

Susser received letters from churches, synagogues, and schools inviting him to play his song and talk with teenagers about its anti-drug message. He started to write and produce songs and activities for children, ages 4 through 8. He registered the name, Bobby Susser Songs For Children, and the series began. Titles from the early 1970s include "Learning Basic Awareness Through Music," "Pre-Physical Education Through Music," "Pre-Square Dance," "Let's Act As Consumers," and his series for young pre-readers, Doctor Alphabet.

=== 1980s and 1990s ===
During the 1980s, he visited schools with his young children's songs. At that same time he also wrote and produced songs for his own pop, studio group, The Bobby Susser Generation. But he returned to writing and producing young children's music, and continued to appear in schools with songs and activities for his early childhood audiences. In 1991, he formed a new record company, "New Hope Records", in order to administer the distribution, sales, and license rights of his recordings. He wrote and produced songs for thematic albums, and by 1996 they had become some of the most popular young children's songs and recordings used in day care centers, schools, churches, synagogues, and homes. He created "The Bobby Susser Singers", "The Bobby Susser Children's Chorus", and a logo caricature of himself, drawn from a photograph, for his series, "Bobby Susser Songs For Children", ages 2 through 8. Michael Green was often the lead male vocalist, and Deanna Jones was often the lead female vocalist on several of the early recordings within this series. By 1998, Susser broadened his guest list of vocalists, and began working with a greater variety of adult and children singers, and made guest appearances on his song series for young children. He continued to make changes in his personnel of singers and players depending upon the song, style, and subject matter. In the year of 1999, he went back to visit young children's classrooms and lectured on the subject of young children's songs.

=== 2000s ===
From 2002 through 2004, he wrote, recorded, and added four new collections to his young children's series (I Need You and You Need Me, Respect and Confidence, Early Learning Sing-Along, and My Day/In Motion and Play), and received a Parents' Choice Award for the first three. In June 2008, Susser released the collection of original young children's songs All Roads Leads To Home. One review stated, "All Roads Lead To Home is a very solid choice to use with preschoolers, and its additional song, '70 (Bringin' It Home To You)', for all ages, makes for a wider family appeal" and another said, "All Roads Lead To Home" is headed for the group of classic and standard young children's recordings."

In February 2009, Susser's children's series surpassed 5 million albums sold. In September 2009, Susser released AMERICA: An Album For All Ages. By December, the new album received Dr.Toy's Best Audio-Video-CD Product Award for 2009, and was cited as "An American Treasure Of Songs."

=== 2010–2015 ===
On April 22, 2010, AMERICA: An Album For All Ages, was designated a 2010 Parents' Choice Award winner.

In the spring of 2011 Susser embarked on a library tour, visiting children's libraries throughout The United States. Susser said he planned to make it "somewhat of an 'ongoing tour', and I will continue to write songs, and record them." But in an interview with edplay he stated that as of July 2011 he had to cancel touring indefinitely due to a neck and back injury. He returned to the recording studio, and at the end of December 2011 Susser completed his 25th album for children of all ages. He titled the collection of 12 new songs, WO!

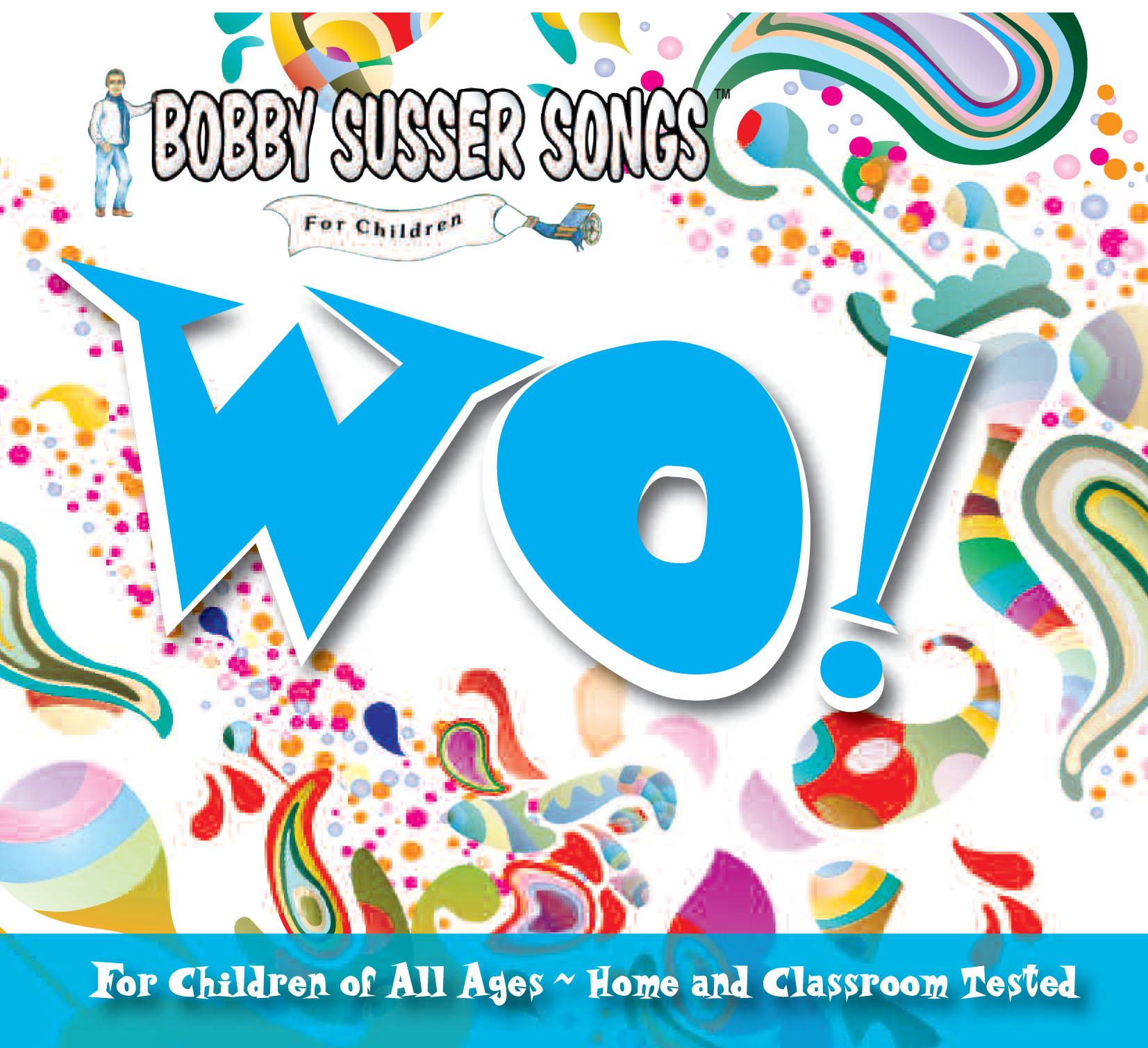
WO! album cover.

The new album was released on April 3, 2012, to favorable reviews; " WO! is a magnificent collection of songs for children of all ages, from a magnificent children's song man", and, "In the past forty years, Bobby Susser has recorded some of the best children's albums, and his work gets better with each one. WO! is no exception. It is his 25th children's album, and his finest to date. WO! should be a favorite, and a sure classic, for children of all ages." School Library Journal wrote that Susser "has outdone himself."

On April 13, 2013, at Teachers College, Columbia University, Susser was awarded the 2013 Distinguished Alumni Award, for his life's work, and his name was engraved in the main hallway of the college. In Susser's acceptance speech, he stated, "Teaching children through songs, in addition to entertaining, always appealed to me. This incredible honor, reinforces my commitment to educating, and entertaining children through music and songs."

In June 2014, Susser, along with producers Kevin Mackie and Krista Wallinger, won the 13th annual Independent Music Awards in the Best Spoken Word (with music accompaniment) Category for "ACTION MOVES PEOPLE." The album's proceeds go to benefit MOVE THIS WORLD charity, which is a global nonprofit that uses creative movement to address and transform conflict and violence in communities worldwide.

On June 12, 2015, Susser was honored at the Josephine Foundation's annual gala dinner, for his lifetime of work. The Foundation supports children in the arts, and sports locally and globally. At the gala, Susser also received official commendations for his work from the New York City Council, the New York State Senate, and United States Congress.

=== Smithsonian Folkways Recordings 2016–2017 ===
Smithsonian Folkways Recordings, whose mission includes preserving and disseminating music from all over the world, acquired Susser's New Hope Records catalog of music for young children. ‘Bobby Susser Songs for Children,’ a 12-album set was released direct-to-digital September 9, 2016, features Susser's music, originally issued between 1994 and 2012.

Paul Simon said, “I’ve known Bobby Susser most of my life. It turned out he was not only a gold glove shortstop but a masterful creator of children’s songs.” “Bobby Susser’s dozen albums have an engaging sound, a positive vision, and timeless messages,” says Atesh Sonneborn, associate director of Smithsonian Folkways Recordings. The focus of ‘Bobby Susser Songs for Children’ is on developmentally appropriate childhood milestones. Susser plans to continue his series of albums while recovering from surgery, and said, "I'll be writing new songs, recording them, and visiting young children with my work. What else would I do."

On July 18, 2017, Smithsonian Folkways Recordings celebrated Susser's 75th birthday, and announced that they will be running a campaign sale on all of his music. Susser celebrated his birthday by finishing his 26th children's album.

=== 2018-2020 ===
On June 19, 2018, Susser released his 27th album, titled "Green Light." Educational Dealer magazine stated, “The 12 songs that Bobby Susser has written for his new album Green Light are all sprinkled with positive thoughts. He emphasizes courtesy, kindness, laughter, and happiness. He has the ability to write the most catchy, melodic lines that children can easily sing along with, and lyrics that teach in a most friendly and fun-like manner. He uses a number of instruments like cowbells, shakers, several guitars, bass, pianos, a section of horns and violins, and several percussive instruments, to convey his messages. On September 20, 2018, it was announced that "Green Light" received the Parents' Choice Award. On November 23, 2018, Susser became the recipient of Dr. Toy's international “Best Pick” for his album “Green Light” for 2018.

In May 2019, Susser was ready to start recording a collection of songs that he kept to himself for six years. When asked by an interviewer, "Why did it take so long?". Susser replied, "I'm not baking a cake". He's expecting to complete the children's collection sometime in 2020. Susser says that he's not sure how many songs will be on this collection, but has said that he believes it will be unquestionably his finest work. It will be his 28th children's album.

=== Other contributions and accolades ===
Susser has written, produced, performed, and contributed the official theme song "Bikewell Bear And St. Jude," for St. Jude Children's Research Hospital. Billboard Magazine said that "Bobby Susser is unusually prolific and consistently does excellent work.Manhattan School of Music has stated, "Bobby Susser has the rare ability to return to childhood at will. He is a master at communicating, teaching, entertaining, and stimulating young children through his believable and original songs." Early Childhood News says, "Bobby Susser is unlike other children's musical artists in that he writes for them (the children), not for himself. He knows what catches their imaginations, and he brings that sensitive awareness to his very enjoyable songs."

Susser has written:

- The educational papers, "Implications of Rearing and Educating Children," 1975 and 1976; (Columbia University Press)
- "The Lollipop Music Theory," 2003
- "Choosing Songs for Children," 2004
- Activities, purpose and parent/teacher notes for every title in the series Bobby Susser Songs for Children.

=== Personal life ===
Susser was a longtime resident of Long Island and lived by the bay with his wife, Jan, a teacher. They had three children. He enjoyed baseball and watched the New York Yankees.

Susser died on September 15, 2020, aged 78, after several weeks of ill health.

== Discography ==
=== Selected children's albums ===
- We Are Better Together (Produced And Written, 1994)
- The Album For All Seasons (Produced And Written, 1995)
- Wiggle Wiggle and Other Exercises (Produced And Written, 1996)
- Animals At The Zoo (Produced And Written, 1997)
- I Have Songs In My Pocket (Produced And Written, 1998)
- I Need You And You Need Me (Produced And Written, 2002)
- Respect And Confidence (Produced And Written, 2002)
- Early Learning Sing-Along (Produced And Written, 2003)
- My Day/In Motion And Play (Produced And Written, 2004)
- All Roads Lead To Home (Produced And Written, 2008). Includes the song, "70 (Bringin' It Home To You)."
- AMERICA: An Album For All Ages (Produced And Written, 2009). Includes the singles, "America", and "Dancing In The USA."
- WO! (Produced And Written, 2012). Includes the singles, "Any Time Of Day", and "The Wo Wo Song."
- Green Light (Produced And Written, 2018)

=== Other albums ===
- Encounter (Produced And Written, 1971)
- Learning Basic Awareness Through Music (Produced And Written, 1972)
- Pre-Physical Education Through Music (Produced And Written, 1972)
- Pre-Square Dance Music (Produced And Written, 1972)
- Let's Act (Produced And Written, 1972)
- Pre-Driver's Education Through Music (Produced And Written, 1973)
- Learning Responsibility Through Music (Produced And Written, 1973)
- Let's Act As Consumers (Produced And Written, 1973)
- Motivating Thought Processes Through Music (Produced And Written, 1973)
- Doctor Alphabet (Produced And Written, 1974)
- Growing Up With A Song (Produced And Written, 1992)
- Songs For Your Day (Produced And Written, 1992)
- Everybody Needs Somebody (Produced And Written, 1993)
- Action Moves People (Produced, Written, And Performed, 2013)

=== Selected children's singles ===
- Once We Help Each Other, The Bobby Susser Singers (Produced And Written 1994)
- Wiggle Wiggle, The Bobby Susser Singers (Produced And Written, 1996)
- A Trip To The Zoo, The Bobby Susser Singers (Produced And Written, 1997)
- Baseball, Baseball, The Bobby Susser Singers (Produced And Written, 1995)
- Any Time Of Day, The Bobby Susser Singers (Produced And Written, 2013)
- The Wo Wo Song, The Bobby Susser Singers (Produced And Written, 2013)
- Green Light, The Bobby Susser Singers (Produced And Written), 2018)

=== Singles ===
- I Don't Believe Them, Tico And The Triumphs (Produced, 1961)
- Motorcycle, Tico And The Triumphs (Produced, 1961)* Wildflower, Tico And The Triumphs (Produced, 1962)
- Express Train, Tico And The Triumphs (Produced, 1962)
- Cry Lil Boy, Cry, Tico And The Triumphs (Produced, 1962)
- Get Up And Do The Wobble, Tico And The Triumphs (Produced 1962)
- Kiss Me Now, Florence DeVore (Produced And Written, 1965)
- We're Not Old Enough, Florence DeVore (Produced And Written, 1965)
- The Guy Next Door, Florence DeVore (Produced And Written, 1966)
- That Tangerine, The Troys (Written, 1966)
- Up To Now, Trini Lopez (Written, 1967)
- Gotta Fit You Into My Life, The Troys (Written, 1967)
- I Can Feel Him Slipping Away, Mamie Lee (Written, 1967)
- Half As Much, Sharon Redd (Produced, 1968)
- Do You Want Me?, Sharon Redd (Produced And Written, 1968)
- I've Got A Feeling, Sharon Redd (Produced And Written, 1968)
- Since I Lost You, Sharon Redd (Produced And Written, 1968)
- Once You Understand, Think (Produced And Written, 1971)
- It's Not The World, It's The People, Think (Produced And Written, 1972)
- He Doesn't Love You, Florence DeVore (Produced And Written, 1972)
- He's Got The Money Bags, Florence DeVore (Produced And Written, 1972)
- It Takes A Lot Of Love To Love Me, Florence DeVore (Produced And Written, 1973)
- Look Out, Florence DeVore (Produced And Written, 1973)
- All That I Know, The Bobby Susser Generation (Produced And Written, 1982)
- All Roads Lead To Home, The Bobby Susser Singers (Produced And Written, 2008)
- America, The Bobby Susser Singers (Produced And Written, 2009)
- Dancing In The USA, The Bobby Susser Singers (Produced And Written, 2010)
- Smiling Face, The Bobby Susser Singers (Produced And Written, 2012)
- Any Time Of Day, The Bobby Susser Singers (Produced And Written, 2013)
- The Wo Wo Song, The Bobby Susser Singers (Produced And Written, 2013)
- Green Light, The Bobby Susser Singers (Produced And Written, 2018)
