= Streetheart =

Streetheart may refer to:

- Streetheart / Le cœur au poing, a 1998 film
- Streetheart (band), a Canadian rock band
- Streetheart (Dion album), an album
