= Born to Cry =

Born to Cry may refer to:

- "(I Was) Born to Cry", 1962 song by Dion DiMucci; see Dion DiMucci discography
- "Born to Cry", a song by the Swedish rock band The Hives on "Two-Timing Touch and Broken Bones"
