= Runaround Sue (album) =

Studio album by Dion
- Released: 1961
- Genres: Rock and roll; doo-wop
- Length: 30:21
- Label: Laurie

Dion chronology
Wish Upon a Star with Dion and the Belmonts (1960)	Runaround Sue (1961)	Alone with Dion (1961)

Singles from Runaround Sue
- 1. "Somebody Nobody Wants/Could Somebody Take My Place Tonight" Released: July 1961; 2. "Runaround Sue/Runaway Girl" Released: August 1961; 3. "The Wanderer/The Majestic" Released: November 1961

Professional ratings
Review scores
Source	Rating
AllMusic	2.5/5 stars
Billboard	(positive)

Runaround Sue is the first solo album by Dion, released in 1961 by Laurie Records.

== Track listing ==
Side A
No.	Title	Writer(s)	Length
1.	"Runaround Sue"	Dion DiMucci, Ernie Maresca	2:40
2.	"Somebody Nobody Wants"	George Goehring, Sylvia Dee	2:35
3.	"Dream Lover"	Bobby Darin	2:18
4.	"Life Is But a Dream"	Raul Cita, Sam Weiss	2:33
5.	"The Wanderer"	Ernie Maresca	2:40
6.	"Runaway Girl"	Barbara Baer, Eliot Greenberg, Robert Schwartz	2:27
Total length:			15:13

Side B
No.	Title	Writer(s)	Length
1.	"The Majestic"	Brenda Lee Jones, Welton Young	2:26
2.	"Little Star"	Vito Picone, Arthur Venosa	2:39
3.	"Lonely World"	Dion DiMucci, Ernie Maresca	2:11
4.	"In the Still of the Night"	Fred Parris	2:49
5.	"Kansas City"	Jerry Leiber, Mike Stoller	2:39
6.	"Take Good Care of My Baby"	Carole King, Gerry Goffin	2:25
Total length:			15:09

== Chart positions ==
Chart (1961)	Peak position
US Billboard 200	11

Singles

Year	Single	Chart	Peak position
1961	"Somebody Nobody Wants"	US Pop	103
1961	"Runaround Sue"	US Pop	1
1961	"Runaround Sue"	US R&B	4
1961	"Runaround Sue"	UK	11
1961	"The Majestic"	US Pop	36
1961	"The Wanderer"	US Pop	2
1961	"The Wanderer"	UK	10
