= Jan Öjlers =

- Origin: Limmared, Sweden,
- Genres: dansband

Jan Öjlers was a dansband from Sweden. The band scored several Svensktoppen hits.

== Svensktoppen songs ==
- "Natten har tusen ögon - 1968
- Bara dig vill jag ha - 1969
- En skön liten sång - 1971
- Lycka till med nästa kille - 1973
- Maria dansar - 1978
