= Little Diane =

Single by Dion

from the album Lovers Who Wander
- B-side: "Lost for Sure"
- Released: June 1962
- Genre: Rock and roll
- Length: 2:38
- Label: Laurie Records
- Songwriter: Dion DiMucci

Dion singles chronology
"Lovers Who Wander" (1962)	"Little Diane" (1962)	"Love Came to Me" (1962)

"Little Diane" is a song written and performed by Dion featuring The Del-Satins. The song reached number 8 on the Billboard Hot 100 in 1962. It was featured on his 1962 album, Lovers Who Wander. It's considered to be one of the very few charted oldies songs to feature kazoos on the recording.

The song was arranged by Glen Stuart.

The song was ranked number 86 on Billboard magazine's Top Hot 100 songs of 1962.

== Other versions ==
- Rivers Cuomo released a version on his 2007 album Alone: The Home Recordings of Rivers Cuomo which featured the band Sloan.
