= The Fallen Angels (band) =

American psychedelic rock band (1966–1969)

The Fallen Angels in 1968.

The Fallen Angels were an American psychedelic rock band formed in Washington D.C., in 1966. Spearheaded by the group's lead vocalist and bassist, Jack Bryant, the band originally released two albums and several singles, which were marked by lyrical and instrumental experimentation. Despite never breaking through on a national scale, the Fallen Angels were popular in the American music underground, and their music has been revived over the years.

== History ==
The band originated from a folk rock group known as the Disciples, which formed in 1965 when Wally Cook (rhythm guitar, harmonica), who previously worked in local band the Young Rabbits, came together with Jack Bryant (bass guitar, vocals) and Charlie Jones (lead guitar, vocals). Within a few months, the band became known as the Uncalled, followed by a name change to the Fallen Angels, and multiple personnel shifts that concluded with a solidified lineup consisting of Bryant, Cook, Howard Danchik (keyboards), Richard Kumer (drums) and Jack Lauritsen (rhythm guitar). The band quickly established themselves on the American music underground with their stage theatrics enriched by the group's political satire, and their ability to incorporate folk music, jazz, and psychedelia into their own cohesive sound. Much of the Fallen Angels' material was penned by Bryant with a close similarity to the Mothers of Invention.

In 1966, the band was signed to Laurie Records, releasing one single, "Everytime I Fall in Love", in the same year, and the follow-up, "Have You Ever Lost a Love?" in early 1967. After achieving a top ten radio hit with their debut single, the Fallen Angels signed a recording contract with Roulette Records to produce two albums. In late 1967, the band's first album The Fallen Angels was released, but failed to gain a nationwide response as a consequence of Roulette promoting the group as a mainstream pop act in an attempt to repeat the success of Tommy James and the Shondells, who were also signed to the record label at the time. Despite the commercial failure of the album, over time it has become recognized as a classic psychedelic piece. Conflicts with Roulette came to head when the Fallen Angels were scheduled to appear on Upbeat, a Cleveland-based adaptation of American Bandstand, to promote their next single "Hello Girl". The record label rearranged the song to be more commercially appealing without the band's consent, consequently leading the group to retaliate by ripping a doll's head off during filming. As a result, the performance was heavily edited for the broadcasting.

In 1968, Roulette Records all but abandoned their attempts to make the Fallen Angels a mainstream musical act, and allowed the group much more artistic freedom for their second album It's A Long Way Down. Although promotion by the record label was nearly non-existent, the album fulfilled the group's desire to exemplify their eclectic approach, and, like its predecessor, is considered a psychedelic masterpiece. However, it was a commercial failure and the band was soon dropped from the label, but continued to tour with new drummer John "Thumper" Molloy until disbanding in 1969. In 1974, former manager, Tom Traynor, released a single featuring material recorded by the Fallen Angels in 1969 on his independent record label Sun Dream. In 1994, Collectables Records released much of the group's material on the two compilation albums The Roulette Masters, Part 1 and The Roulette Masters, Part 2. The band's two albums were also remastered by the label in the following years.

In 1997, Bryant reformed the Fallen Angels and they recorded a third album Rain of Fire, which contained new material together with new recordings of previously released compositions. The refashioned lineup continued to perform on the east coast until 2009.
