= Lovers Who Wander (Dion album) =

Studio album by Dion
- Released: 1962
- Genre: Rock and roll
- Length: 31:18
- Label: Laurie

Dion chronology
| Alone with Dion (1961) | Lovers Who Wander (1962) | Dion Sings to Sandy (1963) |

Singles from Lovers Who Wander
- 1. "Lovers Who Wander/(I Was) Born to Cry" Released: April 1962; 2. "Little Diane/Lost for Sure" Released: June 1962; 3. "Sandy/Faith" Released: February 1963; 4. "Come Go with Me/King Without a Queen" Released: May 1963; 5. "Shout/Little Girl" Released: March 1964

Professional ratings
Review scores
| Source | Rating |
|---|---|
| AllMusic | 4/0 stars |

Lovers Who Wander is the third solo album by Dion, released in 1962 by Laurie Records.

== Track listing ==
Side A
| No. | Title | Writer(s) | Length |
|---|---|---|---|
| 1. | "Lovers Who Wander" | Dion DiMucci, Ernie Maresca | 2:19 |
| 2. | "Come Go with Me" | Clarence Quick | 2:42 |
| 3. | "King Without a Queen" | Brenda Lee Jones, Welton Young | 2:30 |
| 4. | "The Twist" | Hank Ballard | 2:31 |
| 5. | "Little Diane" | Dion DiMucci | 2:38 |
| 6. | "Stagger Lee" | Harold Logan, Lloyd Price | 2:25 |
| Total length: | | | 15:05 |

Side B
| No. | Title | Writer(s) | Length |
|---|---|---|---|
| 1. | "Shout" | O'Kelly Isley Jr., Rudolph Isley, Ronald Isley | 4:18 |
| 2. | "Tonight Tonight" | Billy Myles | 2:37 |
| 3. | "(I Was) Born to Cry" | Dion DiMucci | 2:23 |
| 4. | "Queen of the Hop" | Woody Harris | 2:03 |
| 5. | "Sandy" | Steve Brandt, Dion DiMucci | 2:17 |
| 6. | "Lost for Sure" | Dion DiMucci, Susan Butterfield | 2:35 |
| Total length: | | | 16:13 |

== Chart positions ==
| Chart (1962) | Peak position |
|---|---|
| US Billboard 200 | 12 |

Singles

| Year | Single | Chart | Peak position |
|---|---|---|---|
| 1962 | "(I Was) Born to Cry" | US Pop | 42 |
| 1962 | "Lovers Who Wander" | US Pop | 3 |
| 1962 | "Lovers Who Wander" | US R&B | 16 |
| 1962 | "Little Diane" | US Pop | 8 |
| 1963 | "Sandy" | US Pop | 21 |
| 1963 | "Come Go with Me" | US Pop | 48 |
| 1964 | "Shout" | US Pop | 108 |
