= Mike LeRoy =

English writer and singer (1937-2020)

Mike LeRoy (1937-2020), born Michael Robinson-Learoyd on 18 March 1937, was an English writer and singer.

Leroy sang the theme song to the 1965 film, A High Wind in Jamaica. He also sang "With a Little Love" in 1970, which was subsequently used on the Attila the Hun sketch of Monty Python's Flying Circus.

== Biography ==
Mike LeRoy was born in Lupset, Wakefield. His father was in the Royal Air Force and his mother was a farmers daughter. His grandfather was the farmer and breeder of hunters, Mark Robinson of Driffield.

LeRoy's mother and father separated when he was seven so he went to live with his sister, brother and mother in the Yorkshire Dales (Arkengarthdale). The family moved to Croft-on-Tees in Yorkshire when he was eleven and it was there that LeRoy was awarded one of only two annual scholarships to Richmond School in Yorkshire where he was a boarder until 18 years old.

LeRoy entered into RAF aircrew in March 1955 for an eight-year term but resigned and left the RAF in March 1957 as he felt that flying was not his aspiration anymore.

LeRoy's commanding officer said "This man should do well in any field of activity which requires his initiative and powers of command". When asked what his future plans were he replied, "I want to be a singer".

== Career ==
LeRoy went to London after the RAF and became a well known troubadour, playing his guitar and singing nightly in the clubs and restaurants of Chelsea as well as the West End of London. He was discovered during that time and made his first record for Decca in 1961 under the name of Roy Lee.

LeRoy made his first contracted singing engagement in Saint Helier in 1963 where he met his wife. He then went on to record with several labels in the sixties (EMI Columbia/CBS/MCA). In 1965, he recorded the title song to the film A High Wind in Jamaica for 20th Century Studios.

During the second half of the sixties, LeRoy owned a bistro called The Strolling Guitar in Hampstead. In 1969, he acquired the famous French Restaurant, a night club in Gloucester Road, London. Whilst owning this club, LeRoy continued to record and appeared in TV shows such as Thank Your Lucky Stars, Lunchbox and Discs A Go Go.

In 1974, LeRoy decided to move into the country and start a family. At this time he took a break from singing. He settled near Ascot and took a lease on all the catering facilities at Shepperton Studios, including the Pub. For the next five years he fed up to 1000 people every day.

At the same time, LeRoy farmed pigs on his land at Ascot and bought property in Northampton and the North. These interests continued for a decade, and then with his two children in mind, LeRoy bought the famous Stubbington House School.

In 1991, after finishing a period in local government, LeRoy was granted a coat of arms by the King of Arms following a petition to the Earl Marshal with his crest and motto.

After LeRoy's two sons finished their university education, he decided to invest in property again and built up an extensive property empire most of which is now disposed of but some houses are still retained and run by his sons who also took over his Ascot Holding and turned it into the famous Palm Hills Boutique Hotel and convention center. LeRoy retired after he and his sons disposed of his property holdings in 2015. His son Deke carried on with his property development, and his son Ross is now a successful film producer. LeRoy later wrote screenplays and advised on film production.

LeRoy also developed his writing skills and created the film story/script of The Snow Princess with Noble House Entertainments.

With three other film scripts completed and in development, LeRoy decided to write and sing again after requests from his loyal fan base. He continued writing and recording music until his death during the COVID-19 pandemic in early 2020.

== Discography ==
Song name	Year	Label
"Honey Lies"	1961	Decca
"500 Miles"	1964	EMI Columbia
"No One Knows"	1964	EMI Columbia
"I Forgot What It Was Like"	1964	EMI Columbia
"The Big City"	1964	EMI Columbia
"Girl, Girl"	1968	CBS
"Don't Seek a Love"	1968	CBS
"Diana"	1969	CBS
"Woman in My Life"	1970	CBS
With a Little Love	1970	CBS
"Holly Holy"	1971	MCA
"I Love You Because"	2010	Gammaka
"Common or Garden"	2011	Mike Leroy Productions
