= Lonely Teenager (song) =

Single by Dion

from the album Alone with Dion
- B-side: "Little Miss Blue"
- Released: 1960
- Genre: Rock and roll
- Length: 2:13
- Label: Laurie Records 3070
- Songwriter(s): Alfred DiPaola, Silvio Faraci, Salvatore Pippa

Dion singles chronology
"Lonely Teenager" (1960)	"Havin' Fun" (1961)

"Lonely Teenager" is a song written by Alfred DiPaola, Silvio Faraci, and Salvatore Pippa and performed by Dion. It is Dion's first solo single. The song reached number 12 on the Billboard Hot 100 and number 47 in the UK in 1960. It was featured on his 1961 album, Alone with Dion.

The song was arranged by Bob Mersey.
