= Sandy (Dion DiMucci song) =

1963 song written by Steve Brandt and Dion DiMucci

Single by Dion

from the album Lovers Who Wander
- B-side: "Faith"
- Released: 1963
- Genre: Pop
- Length: 2:18
- Label: Laurie 3153
- Songwriters: Steve Brandt; Dion DiMucci

Dion singles chronology
"Ruby Baby" (1963)	"Sandy" (1963)	"This Little Girl" (1963)

"Sandy" is a song written by Steve Brandt and Dion DiMucci, and recorded by Dion in 1962. It was first released on the album Lovers Who Wander. Released as a single in March of 1963 the song spent 11 weeks on the Billboard Hot 100, reaching number 21.

A 1973 Svenne & Lotta recording was released as a single in April 1973, and peaked at number two on Norway's VG-lista chart.

A 1973 Jan Öjlers recording, "Lycka till med nästa kille", charted on Svensktoppen for one week. It peaked at number 10 on October 21, 1973.

== Charts ==
=== Dion version ===
Chart (1963)	Peak position
Sweden (Kvällstoppen)	2
Sweden (Tio i Topp)	1
Billboard Hot 100	21

=== Svenne & Lotta version ===
Chart (1973)	Peak position
Norway	2
