= Love Came to Me =

Single by Dion

from the album Love Came to Me
- B-side: "Little Girl"
- Released: October 1962
- Genre: Rock and roll
- Length: 2:38
- Label: Laurie Records 3145
- Songwriters: Dion DiMucci, John Falbo

Dion singles chronology
"Little Diane" (1962)	"Love Came to Me" (1962)	"Ruby Baby" (1962)

"Love Came to Me" is a song written by Dion DiMucci and John Falbo and performed by Dion featuring the Del-Satins. The song was arranged by Glen Stuart. It was featured on his 1963 album, Love Came to Me.

== Chart performance ==
"Love Came to Me" reached number 10 on the Billboard Hot 100 and number 24 on the R&B chart in 1962.
