= Think (band) =

Former American studio group

Think was an American studio group put together by producers and songwriters Lou Stallman and Bobby Susser in 1971.

This group is not to be confused with a West Coast-based band of the same name, that recorded two singles for Columbia Records in 1968 and 1969.

The group released a single, "Once You Understand", on Laurie Records which consists mostly of a dialogue between teenagers and their parents over the growing culture change; the teenagers have liberal viewpoints, while their parents are more conservative. Throughout the record, the words "things get a little easier/ once you understand" are repeated. The song ends abruptly as a policeman calls the father with the news that his 17-year-old son is dead from an overdose.

"Once You Understand" started getting airplay in late 1971, hitting number one at stations KQV in Pittsburgh and WIXY in Cleveland; nationally, it made it to No. 23 on the Billboard Hot 100 chart in early 1972, even though some stations banned the song for its reference to drugs. The flip side of the single, "Gather" is a poem sung about life being short. (In later decades, "Once You Understand" was often sampled by hip hop, house, and jungle artists.) The song also peaked at number 76 in Australia.

The record was re-released in early 1974, when the partial broadcast ban was lifted and peaked at No. 53 on the Billboard Hot 100.

Laurie released another single from Think, "It's Not the World, It's the People" b/w "Who Are You to Tell Me What to Do", as well as an album, Encounter "Once You Understand", but neither was a hit.
