= Return of the Wanderer =

Studio album by Dion
- Released: 1978
- Recorded: 1978
- Genres: Pop rock; R&B
- Length: 41:11
- Label: Lifesong
- Producers: Terry Cashman; Tommy West

Dion chronology
Streetheart (1976)	Return of the Wanderer (1978)	Inside Job (1980)

Singles from Return of the Wanderer
- 1. "Heart of Saturday Night/You've Awakened Something in Me" Released: 1978; 2. "Midtown American Main Street Gang/Guitar Queen" Released: 1978; 3. "(I Used to Be a) Brooklyn Dodger/Streetheart Theme" Released: 1978

Return of the Wanderer is a studio album by American musician Dion. The album was released in 1978 by Lifesong Records. It was produced by Terry Cashman and Tommy West. Dion would not record another secular album until 1989's Yo Frankie.

== Critical reception ==
Professional ratings
Review scores
Source	Rating
AllMusic	4.5/5 stars
The Minneapolis Star	1.5/4 stars
MusicHound Rock: The Essential Album Guide	4/5 stars
The Rolling Stone Album Guide	3/5 stars

The Minneapolis Star noted that many songs sound "too much like Elton John or Billy Joel." Newsday opined that the production "is craftsmanlike but without a point of view." The Argus Leader determined that, "while the original punk rocker still has his pipes, his music is Las Vegas compared to the street-strutting toughs, like Bruce Springsteen and Southside Johnny, who have replaced him in the public eye." The Morning Call deemed the album "a pleasant, sensitive and upbeat attempt at a comeback."

== Track listing ==
No.	Title	Writer(s)	Length
1.	"Heart of Saturday Night"	Tom Waits	3:46
2.	"Midtown American Main Street Gang"	D. Beck, DiMucci	5:57
3.	"You've Awakened Something in Me"	B. Tuohy, DiMucci	3:30
4.	"Guitar Queen"	DiMucci, M. Tiernan	4:43
5.	"The Pattern of My Lifeline"	Tuohy, DiMucci	3:56
6.	"(I Used to be a) Brooklyn Dodger"	Beck, DiMucci	4:00
7.	"Streetheart Theme"	B. London, D. Weston, L. Foy, M. Tiernan, R. Steele	3:03
8.	"The Power of Love Within"	Tuohy, DiMucci	4:07
9.	"Spanish Harlem Incident"	Bob Dylan	4:59
10.	"Do You Believe in Magic"	John Sebastian	3:10
Total length:			41:11

== Personnel ==
- Dion DiMucci – lead vocals, rhythm guitar, acoustic guitar
- Tommy West – acoustic guitar, backing vocals, producer
- Terry Cashman – backing vocals, producer
- Buzz London – drums
- Rusty Steele – lead guitar, rhythm guitar, backing vocals
- Denny Weston – bass
- Mark Tiernan – keyboards, backing vocals
- Lee Foy – saxophone, flute, harmonica, backing vocals
- John Berg – design [cover]
- Susan Senk – coordinator [production]
- Dave Crowther – engineer [assistant]
- Larry Gates – engineer [assistant]
- Bruce Tergesen – engineer, mixing
- Stan Kalina – mastering
- Jim Houghton – photography
- Lani Groves – backing vocals
- Marty Nelson – backing vocals
- Vivian Cherry – backing vocals
- Jon Cobert – synthesizer
- Henry Gloss – slide guitar, rhythm guitar, electric guitar [12 string]
- Eric Weissberg – pedal steel guitar
- Jimmy Maelen – percussion
- John Abbott – strings, violas
