= The Butcher Boy (soundtrack) =

Soundtrack album by Elliot Goldenthal
- Released: March 17, 1998
- Genre: Irish, classical, swing, jazz, rock & roll, Avant-garde, modernist
- Label: Edeltone; 0037862EDL
- Producer: Matthias Gohl

Elliot Goldenthal chronology
A Time to Kill (1996)	The Butcher Boy (1998)	Sphere (1998)

Professional ratings
Review scores
Source	Rating
Musicfromthemovies	3.5/5 stars
Moviemusicuk.us	4/5 stars

Elliot Goldenthal scored the 1997 movie The Butcher Boy; the soundtrack was released in 1998. It marks another collaboration with director Neil Jordan.

== Track listing ==
1. The Francie Brady Show (2:23) - Elliot Goldenthal
2. Blood of the Apache (2:34) - Elliot Goldenthal
3. Tune for Da (2:07) - Elliot Goldenthal
4. Mack the Knife (2:37) - Performed by Santo & Johnny
5. Pig Fur Elise (3:30) - Elliot Goldenthal
6. No One Knows (2:34) - Performed by Dion and the Belmonts
7. My Ole Pal (1:20) - Elliot Goldenthal
8. Blessed Mothers Carnival Night (3:37) - Elliot Goldenthal
9. Funeral and Ave Maria (1:53) - Elliot Goldenthal
10. Oh Mein Papa (2:44) - Performed by Eddie Calvert
11. Francie Brady Not our Lady (1:20) - Elliot Goldenthal
12. Tune for Da (2:17) - Elliot Goldenthal
13. Nut Rocker (1:58) - Performed by B Bumble & the Stingers
14. Sweet Heart of Jesus (3:28) - Performed by Regina Nathan
15. The Butcher Boy (4:06) - Performed by Sinéad O'Connor

== Crew/Credit ==
- Music Composed by Elliot Goldenthal (except 4, 6, 8, 10, 13, 14 & 15)
- Music Produced by Matthias Gohl and Elliot Goldenthal
- Orchestrated by Elliot Goldenthal and Robert Elhai
- Conducted by Edward Shearmur
- Recorded by James P. Nichols and Steve McLaughlin
- Mixed by Steve McLaughlin
