= Dion DiMucci =

American singer and songwriter (born 1939)

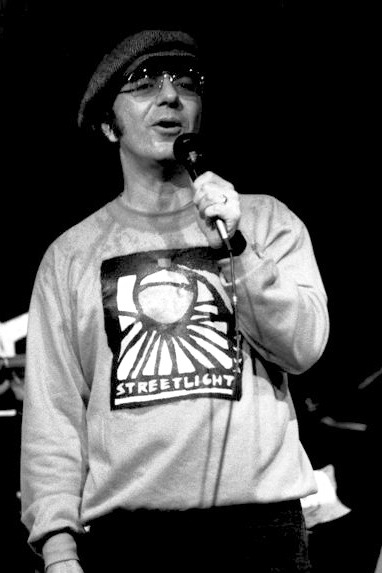
- Dion performing at the Westbury Music Fair

Background information
- Born: Dion Francis DiMucci; July 18, 1939 (age 87); The Bronx, New York, U.S.
- Genres: Pop rock; doo-wop; R&B; rock and roll; teen pop; folk rock; CCM; blues; blues rock
- Occupations: Singer; songwriter
- Instruments: Vocals; guitar
- Years active: 1957–present
- Labels: Mohawk; Laurie; Columbia; ABC; Warner Bros.; Arista; DaySpring; Blue Horizon; Keeping the Blues Alive; His Master's Voice
- Formerly of: Dion and the Belmonts; the Del-Satins; the Little Kings; the Wanderers; the Timberlanes
- Spouse: Susan Butterfield (m. 1963)
- Website: diondimucci.com

Dion Francis DiMucci (born July 18, 1939), better known mononymously as Dion, is an American singer, musician and songwriter. His music incorporates elements of doo-wop, pop, rock, R&B, folk and blues. Initially the lead singer of the vocal group Dion and the Belmonts, Dion embarked on a solo career, and was one of the most prominent rock and roll performers of the pre-British Invasion era. He had 39 Top 40 hits in the late 1950s and early 1960s as a solo performer, or with the Belmonts and the Del-Satins. He is best known for his signature hit songs "Runaround Sue", "The Wanderer", "Ruby Baby" and "Lovers Who Wander", among others.

Dion continued making music after his popularity waned in 1964, and for the rest of the decade he diversified his style, fervently exploring country and urban blues while recording electric folk rock. After a religious transformation in 1968, Dion resuscitated his commercial career with the major hit "Abraham, Martin and John".

During the 1980s, Dion produced several Christian albums, winning a GMA Dove Award in 1984 for the album I Put Away My Idols. He returned to secular music in the late 1980s with Yo Frankie (1989). Between the mid-2000s and 2024, Dion released seven chart-topping blues albums (three at No. 1). Critics who had dismissed his early work, labeling him as a teen idol, praised his later work and noted the influence he has had on other musicians.

A Grammy-nominated artist, Dion has released over 40 albums, and scored eleven Top 10 hits (including with the Belmonts) on the US Billboard Hot 100 chart. He was inducted into the Rock and Roll Hall of Fame in 1989. In 2002, Dion was inducted into the Grammy Hall of Fame for "Runaround Sue". AllMusic album awards include: Favorite Blues Album for New York Is My Home (2016), Favorite Compilations and Reissues for Kickin Child: Lost Columbia Album 1965 (2017) and Favorite Blues Album for Blues with Friends (2020).

== Early life and family ==
Dion was born to an Italian American family in the Bronx (New York City), New York, on July 18, 1939. His first name was in honor of the French Canadian Dionne quintuplets. He was raised in Belmont, Bronx.

Dion accompanied his father, Pasquale DiMucci (a vaudeville entertainer), on tour as a child. He developed a love of country music, particularly the work of Hank Williams. He was also fond of blues and doo-wop musicians he heard performing in local bars and on the radio. His singing was honed on street corners and local clubs in the Bronx, where he and other neighborhood singers created a cappella riffs.

Dion recalled his uncle giving him a guitar at the age of 12. He began playing R&B and performed in bars before he was a teenager. With the exposure to alcohol and recreational drugs, he started smoking marijuana by age 13, and was using heroin at age 14.

In the mid-1950’s, between the age of 15 and 16, Dion met his wife Susan Butterfield. Although he was addicted to heroin, it didn’t keep him from pursuing a music career.

== Music career ==
=== Beginnings with the Belmonts (1957–1960) ===
In early 1957, Dion auditioned for Bob and Gene Schwartz, for their short-lived Mohawk Records label. They asked Dion to sing a song which had been arranged by Hugo Montenegro, and recorded featuring Vic Damone doing vocals. At first Dion refused, stating the song would sound like something his old fashioned parents would listen to, but the Schwartzes convinced him to give it a try. The backing vocals were by a group called "the Timberlanes", whom Dion had never met. The resulting single, "The Chosen Few", was released under the name "Dion and the Timberlanes", and became a minor regional hit. In a 2019 interview at "Crashing the Party" (a radio program related to Norton Records in Brooklyn, New York), Dion stated that "The Chosen Few" hit the Top Ten locally in Boston, which enabled him to perform this song on American Bandstand. The kids at the show started screaming during his performance, and gave Dion his first impression of being a record star. In his autobiography, The Wanderer, Dion explained that he didn't know who the Timberlanes were. "The vocal group was so white bread, I went back to my neighborhood and I recruited a bunch of guys – three guys – and we called ourselves Dion and the Belmonts".

Bob and Gene Schwartz signed Dion's friends, the Belmonts: Carlo Mastrangelo, Fred Milano, and Angelo D'Aleo. The vocal group was named for the Belmont, Bronx neighborhood, with Dion singing as lead. The new group's breakthrough came in early 1958, when "I Wonder Why" (on their newly formed Laurie Records) made No. 22 on the U.S. charts. The record was the first release for Laurie Records. Dion said of the Belmonts:

"I'd give 'em sounds. I'd give 'em parts and stuff. That's what 'I Wonder Why' was about. We kind of invented this percussive rhythmic sound. If you listen to that song, everybody was doing something different. There's four guys; one guy was doing a bass, I was singing lead, one guy's going 'ooh wah ooh', and another guy's doing a tenor part. It was totally amazing. And when I listen to it, oftentimes what I'm thinking of is 'man, those kids are talented'."

Their initial hit was followed by "No One Knows" and "Don't Pity Me", which also charted the Billboard Top 100. This success won a place for Dion and the Belmonts on the ill-fated "The Winter Dance Party" tour with Buddy Holly, Ritchie Valens, the Big Bopper (J.P. Richardson), Frankie Sardo and other performers. On February 3, 1959, after playing a concert in Clear Lake, Iowa, Holly decided to charter an overnight flight to the next venue rather than travel on the tour bus. Dion was invited to accompany him but decided that he would not spend $36 ($382 in 2024) for the flight, as he considered 36 an unlucky number ($36 was the same monthly rent his parents paid for his childhood apartment) and he could not justify the indulgence. The plane crashed, killing all on board: Holly, Valens, Richardson and the pilot Roger Peterson. Dion and the Belmonts continued on the tour, along with Frankie Sardo, while Bobby Vee (then an unknown artist) performed in Holly's place at the very next concert. Jimmy Clanton, Frankie Avalon, and Fabian were later added to replace the other now-deceased headliners.

Dion and the Belmonts' next single, "A Teenager in Love", was released in March 1959. It eventually reached No. 5 on the U.S. pop charts and No. 28 in the UK. The group's biggest hit, "Where or When", was released in November of that year, and reached No. 3 on the U.S. charts. However, in early 1960, Dion checked into a hospital for heroin addiction, a condition he battled since his mid-teens. Further single releases for the group that year were less successful. With musical, personal and financial differences between Dion and members of the Belmonts, Dion left the group for a solo career in October 1960. By the time of their breakup, all eight Laurie releases had charted on the Hot 100.

=== Solo stardom and touring worldwide (1960–1964) ===
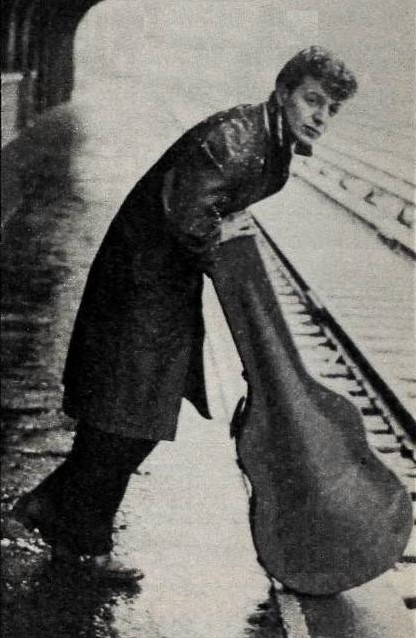
Nascent teen idol Dion (1960)

By the end of 1960, Dion produced his first solo album on Laurie Records, Alone with Dion, released in 1961. The single "Lonely Teenager" rose to No. 12 in the US charts. The name on his solo releases was simply "Dion". Follow-ups "Havin’ Fun" and "Kissin’ Game" had less success, and the signs were that Dion would drift onto the cabaret circuit. However, he then recorded an up-tempo number co-written with Ernie Maresca with a new vocal group, the Del-Satins. The record, "Runaround Sue", stormed up the U.S. charts, reaching No. 1 in October 1961, and No. 11 in the UK, where he also toured. "Runaround Sue" sold over a million copies, achieving gold disc status.

For the next single, Laurie promoted the A-side, "The Majestic", but it was the B-side, Maresca's "The Wanderer", which received more radio play and climbed swiftly up the charts to reach No. 2 in the U.S. in February 1962 and No. 10 in the UK. The 1976 re-release made the UK Top 20.

By the end of 1961, Dion had become a major star, touring worldwide and making an appearance in the Columbia Pictures musical film Twist Around the Clock. In 1962, he followed with a string of singles he wrote or co-wrote including "Lovers Who Wander" (No. 3), "Little Diane" (No. 8), "Love Came to Me" (No. 10). He also had successful albums with Runaround Sue and Lovers Who Wander.

At the end of 1962, Dion moved from Laurie to Columbia Records. He was the first rock ‘n’ roll artist signed to the label, which was an anomaly considering that Mitch Miller (its then-A&R director) loathed that particular genre of music. In 1958 Miller dismissed rock entirely: "Rock ‘n’ roll is musical baby food: it is the worship of mediocrity, brought about by a passion for conformity."

Dion's first Columbia single, Jerry Leiber and Mike Stoller’s "Ruby Baby" (originally a hit for the Drifters) reached No. 2, while "Donna the Prima Donna" and "Drip Drop" (another remake of a Drifters hit) both reached No. 6 in late 1963. Dion also recorded an Italian version of "Donna the Prima Donna" using the identical backup vocals. His other Columbia releases were less successful, and problems with his drug addiction and changing public tastes, especially the British Invasion, saw a period of commercial decline.

=== Belmonts reunion and renewed contract (1965–1968) ===
Following a European tour, Dion returned to the U.S. and was introduced to classic blues by Columbia's John Hammond. To the consternation of his management, he began recording more blues-oriented material, including Willie Dixon’s "Hoochie Coochie Man" and "Spoonful". These releases, some produced by Tom Wilson with Al Kooper on keyboards, were not commercially successful. Still with Columbia, Dion formed a new group to back him in 1965. The Wanderers were composed of John Falbo on guitar, Pete Baron (Pete Falciglia) on bass, and Carlo Mastrangelo of the Belmonts on drums. They made national appearances on Dick Clark’s Where The Action Is, and on The Lloyd Thaxton Show. A number of self-penned tracks were recorded and released unsuccessfully as singles, and did not appear in album format until years later. In June 1965, he recorded fellow Columbia Records contemporary Bob Dylan’s composition "It's All Over Now, Baby Blue", a half-year before Them (featuring Van Morrison)’s hit version.

In 1966–67, Dion briefly reunited with the Belmonts, recording the LP Together Again for ABC Records. The album was unsuccessful, despite one classic self-penned song, "My Girl the Month of May". Two singles were released from the LP. While neither charted in the United States, they fared better in the UK. "My Girl The Month of May" entered the Radio London "Fab 40" at No. 9 the week of December 25, 1966. A ‘turntable’ hit at London underground clubs like Middle Earth, the disc received a lot of play from pirate radio DJ's John Peel and Kenny Everett. The follow-up, "Movin’ Man", reached No. 17 on the "Radio London" charts on Easter Sunday, March 26, 1967. "My Girl The Month of May" was later covered by English artists Alan Bown in 1967, and Island Records artists The Bunch (featuring Sandy Denny and other members of Fairport Convention) in April 1972. During their brief mid-60's reunion, Dion and the Belmonts appeared on the popular Clay Cole Show performing "Berimbau" and "My Girl The Month of May", and occasionally performed at local New York City clubs such as "The Mardi Gras" on Staten Island (April 29, 1967) before disbanding. While Dion's career appeared to be nearing an end, he still retained enough credibility to be, along with Bob Dylan, one of only two rock artists featured on the album cover of the Beatles’ Sgt. Pepper's Lonely Hearts Club Band in 1967.

In April 1968, Dion experienced what he identified as a powerful religious transformation. After getting clean once again from his heroin habit, an experience he documented in his 1970 song "Your Own Backyard", he approached Laurie Records for a new contract. They agreed on the condition that he record the song "Abraham, Martin and John", written by Dick Holler (also the writer of the Royal Guardsmen’s "Snoopy vs. the Red Baron") in response to the assassinations of John F. Kennedy, Martin Luther King Jr. and Robert F. Kennedy. The success of this song (released by Dion in August 1968 and later recorded by many others including Marvin Gaye) which reached No. 4 in the US charts and No. 1 in Canada, resuscitated Dion's career. It sold over one million copies, and was awarded a gold disc.

=== Mature and Christian music period (1969–1986) ===
For the next few years, Dion's music became radically different, moving to more contemplative and mature material. He released several albums essentially as a singer-songwriter, to moderate sales, moving to the Warner Brothers label in 1969.

A live reunion show with the Belmonts at Madison Square Garden was recorded on June 2, 1972. It was released as a live album by Warner, titled Reunion: Live at Madison Square Garden, the following year. In 1973, Dion and the original Belmonts performed together again, doing a sold-out concert at the Nassau Coliseum in Long Island, New York. However, no recording of the 1973 reunion was released. This was followed in 1975 by the album Born to Be with You produced by Phil Spector. The album was a commercial failure, but was praised by artists such as Jason Pierce of Spiritualized and Pete Townshend of The Who, with the track "Only You Know" being sampled by Pulp front man Jarvis Cocker for his single "Don't Let Him Waste Your Time" (from his 2006 solo album Jarvis).

In 1978, Dion released an album drawing on many of his teenage influences, Return of the Wanderer, another commercial failure.

In December 1979, there was a radical spiritual change in Dion, who had become a born again Christian. Thereafter, his recordings for several years were in a contemporary Christian vein, in which he released five albums on the DaySpring Records label, a division of Word Records in Waco, Texas. These albums reflecting his evangelical Christian convictions were Inside Job (1980), Only Jesus (1981), I Put Away My Idols (1983) which charted at No. 37, Seasons (1984), Kingdom in the Streets (1985) and Velvet & Steel (1986). Several singles were successfully released to Christian radio, notably "Still in the Spirit" from Kingdom in the Streets.

In 1984, Dion was nominated for a GMA Dove Award (Christian Music Award) for the album I Put Away My Idols. He was also nominated for a Grammy Award for Best Gospel Vocal Performance, Male for the same album. Dion was ranked 23rd of all Christian artists during the 1980s.

=== Return to secular music and RRHOF induction (1987–1999) ===
In 1987, Dion agreed to do a concert of his old hits at Radio City Music Hall in New York. The two disc CD of this concert was released in 2005, featuring concert photos by Dion's friend, Michael J. Friedman. This concert helped free him to celebrate both his past and his future, and led to a series of special appearances, including a fundraiser for homeless medical relief. There he shared the stage with fans such as Bruce Springsteen, Paul Simon and Lou Reed, all of whom cited Dion as one of their prime influences.

Dion's autobiography, The Wanderer: Dion's Story, was co-authored by Davin Seay and published in the late-1980s.

In 1989, DiMucci returned to rock music with the contemporary album Yo Frankie, which included appearances by Simon ("Written on the Subway Wall"/“Little Star"), Reed, k.d. lang, Patty Smyth and Bryan Adams. Produced by Dave Edmunds (who also played guitar on the album), "Yo Frankie has a sharp sound while never losing sight of Dion's soulful, doo-wop voice." Overall, "the relevant and nostalgic statement from an artist who helped forge rock & roll's first wave" found his way back on radio and in music videos during this period (both on VH1 and MTV), as well as touring.

In 1989, Dion was inducted into the Rock and Roll Hall of Fame (RRHOF), with an introduction by Reed. Controversially, when Dion's solo induction into the Rock and Roll Hall of Fame occurred, the other original members of the Belmonts (Carlo Mastrangelo, Fred Milano and Angelo D’Aleo) were not inducted. In a Billboard magazine article dated January 3, 2012, it stated: "There was strife between DiMucci and Belmonts members, who were not pleased when DiMucci was inducted into the Rock and Roll Hall of Fame without them in 1989."

In 1996, DiMucci joined Scott Kempner and Frank Funaro of the Del-Lords, and Mike Mesaros of the Smithereens, in a short-lived band called Little Kings. A live album was released in 2001, but not widely circulated or promoted. Dion's The Best of the Gospel Years was released in 1997.

External videos
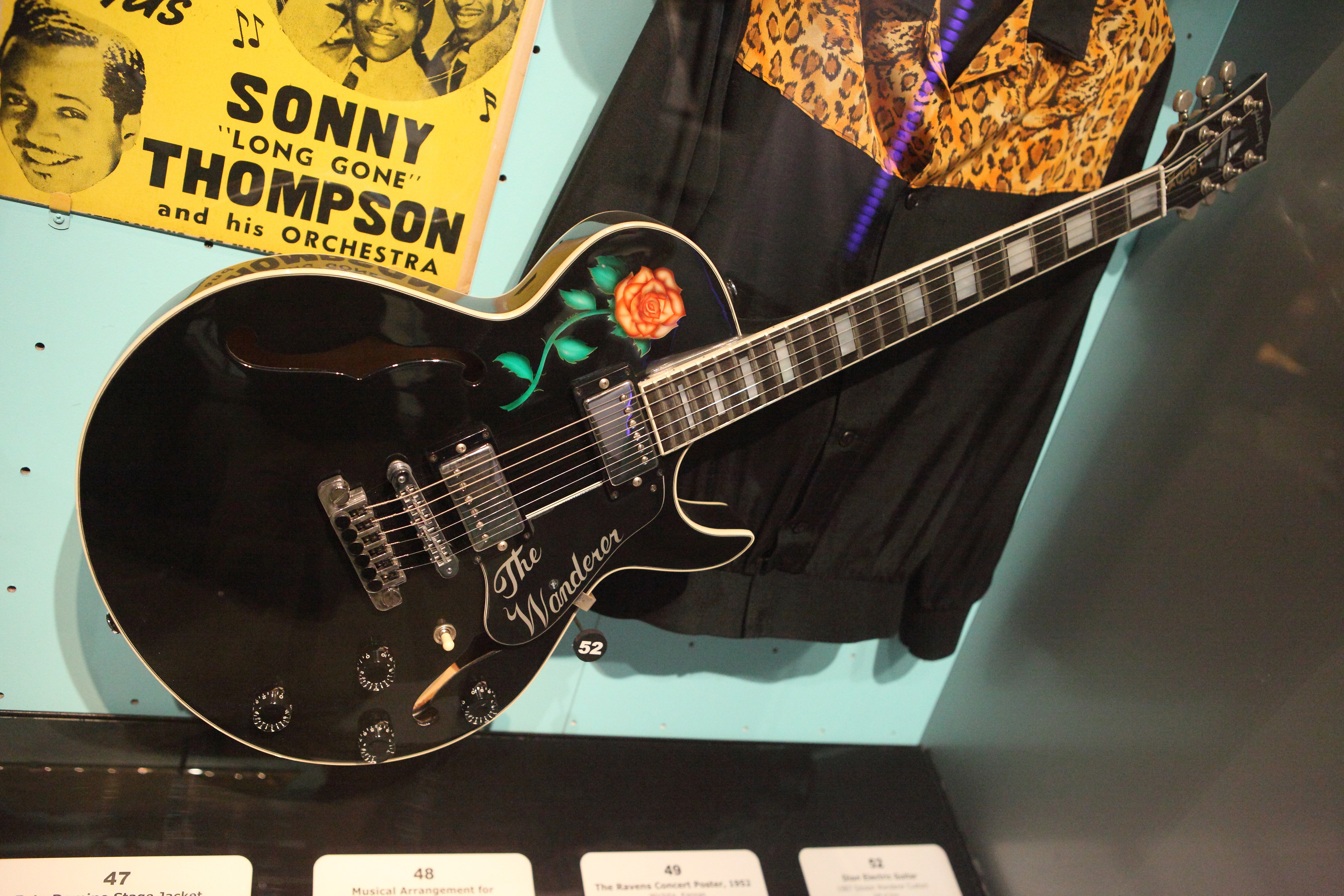
- World Over – Dion DiMucci, his life and music – Raymond Arroyo with Dion DiMucci – 08-11-2011, 56:30, EWTN

=== Grammy Hall of Fame and blues success (2000–2019) ===
Dion has released several albums with contemporary rock artists. His Déjà Nu album in 2000 had him covering Bruce Springsteen, a lifelong fan of Dion. In 2002, he joined Springsteen onstage in Miami, for a performance of "If I Should Fall Behind" from Dream on Fire.

In 2002, Dion was inducted into the Grammy Hall of Fame for "Runaround Sue". He continued to perform songs from his albums live, including a concert in 2004 being recorded for release on DVD.

In January 2006, Dion released Bronx in Blue, an album of blues and country standards, which was nominated for a Grammy Award. It peaked at No. 2 on the Top Blues Albums chart.

In November 2007, Dion issued a follow-up album titled Son of Skip James, which peaked at No. 4 on the Top Blues Albums chart.

In October 2008, DiMucci released Heroes: Giants of Early Guitar Rock, an album of his covers of early rock and roll songs he considers seminal to the genre. The album includes versions of songs originally recorded by Buddy Holly, Ritchie Valens, Ricky Nelson, Johnny Cash, and many other early rock guitarists.

In October 2009, Dion performed "The Wanderer" with Paul Simon at the 25th Anniversary Rock and Roll Hall of Fame Concert.

An audiobook and paperback by Dion and Mike Aquilina, titled Dion: The Wanderer Talks Truth (Stories, Humor & Music), was published in April 2011. DiMucci shares stories about The Bronx in the 1950s, how he ended up on the cover of Sgt. Pepper's Lonely Hearts Club Band, and his travels with Sam Cooke in the Jim Crow South.

Dion released Tank Full of Blues on January 24, 2012. It peaked at No. 3 on the Top Blues Albums chart.

While touring, Dion performed "Donna the Prima Donna" live in Las Vegas, on April 5, 2015. On July 11, 2015, he held a concert in Westbury, New York.

That same year he released the single "New York Is My Home" with Simon. The single was followed by the album New York Is My Home, released February 12, 2016. The album peaked at No. 3 on the Top Blues Album chart. It was also awarded AllMusic's Favorite Blues Albums of 2016.

Dion planned four concerts in the U.S. during early 2016, and was invited as a keynote speaker for the 2016 SXSW in Texas. He spoke on the topic A Conversation with Dion: Rock's Enduring Voice on March 17, 2016.

In May 2017, Dion released Kickin’ Child: The Lost Album 1965 from Norton Records, containing songs recorded in 1965 when he was with Columbia Records (but were not previously released). The album was awarded AllMusic's Favorite Compilations and Reissues of 2017.

=== Recent albums with KTBA Records (2020–present) ===
In June 2020, Dion released Blues with Friends via Keeping the Blues Alive Records (KTBA), an independent record label created by Joe Bonamassa and Roy Weisman for Dion and other blues musicians to showcase their talents. The album features Van Morrison, Jeff Beck, Paul Simon, Bruce Springsteen and others (including liner notes by Bob Dylan). A digital album (and a double vinyl record set), Dion released a music video for every song from the album on his website and social media platforms, such as Facebook and YouTube. The album reached No. 1 on the Billboard Blues Albums chart (9 weeks at No. 1 and 59 weeks total), and No. 4 on iTunes. It also charted in United Kingdom, Germany, France, Italy, Canada and Australia.

The album was awarded AllMusic's Favorite Blues Album of 2020. American Songwriter magazine honored Dion's "Song for Sam Cooke (Here in America)" as the "Greatest of the Great 2020 Songs".

Dion also released two Christmas songs in 2020: "Hello Christmas" (featuring Amy Grant) and "You Know It's Christmas" (featuring Bonamassa). Both songs were co-written with Mike Aquilina. Music videos were produced for both songs.

Dion's song "Blues Comin’ On" (with Bonamassa) from Blues with Friends was nominated for a 2021 Blues Music Award.

In November 2021, Dion released Stomping Ground (with music videos), which includes extensive liner notes written by Pete Townshend. Except for a cover of "Red House", the songs were written by Dion and Aquilina. Multiple guest artists participated on the album, including Springsteen and Patti Scialfa on "Angels in the Alleyways". The album became Dion's second No. 1 blues album.

In April 2022, Dion appeared in an interview on EWTN's The World Over with Raymond Arroyo. They discussed his career, his recent blues albums and The Wanderer musical.

In 2023, Rolling Stone ranked Dion at No. 154 on its list of the 200 Greatest Singers of All Time. On April 24, 2024, he was one of four musicians honored by the Bruce Springsteen Archives & Center for American Music at Monmouth University in New Jersey.

In March 2024, Dion released his third No. 1 blues album, Girl Friends. In October 2024, he released a patriotic collaboration with Carlene Carter, titled "An American Hero" (along with music videos for singles from the album).

In January 2025, Dion released the nostalgic single "New York Minute" and biographical book Dion: The Rock 'N' Roll Philosopher (co-written with recovery and performance coach Adam Jablin). The book covers Dion's personal life and rock-and-roll journey, with contributions from Eric Clapton, Paul Simon, Bishop Robert Barron and Stevie Van Zandt. His album The Rock 'N' Roll Philosopher followed in October 2025 and concerts in 2026. Dion also released a new version of his song "Abraham, Martin and John" on the album.

== The Wanderer musical ==
In October 2011, an industry-only stage reading of a new play about Dion's life was performed in New York City. "The Wanderer is a real life musical, the no-holds-barred story of Dion’s rise to fame, his battle with addiction and the faith and love that turned his life around." According to Bruce Springsteen, New York's rebel king is "the link between Frank Sinatra and rock and roll".

In a December 2011 article from The New York Times, Dion and his collaborator (writer and director Charles Messina) discussed details about the project – titled The Wanderer: The Life and Music of Dion – which would focus on the years between 1957 until the late-1960s. It was planned to feature more than twenty songs from that era, as well as new original music. In the article, Dion gave his perspective on the story: "You know, I always saw my story as a young Sopranos with great music and a Rocky Graziano Somebody Up There Likes Me ending. It's a story of redemption. A rock and roll redemption story!"

DiMucci revealed that Michael Wartella would be starring in The Wanderer on December 16, 2017. There was a reading of the musical in November 2017, while working on the play continued (with Dion posting about the musical via his Instagram account @diondimucciofficial). In December 2019, it was announced that New Kids on the Block member Joey McIntyre would star as Johnny, Michael Wartella as Dion and Christy Altomare as Dion's wife Susan. The Broadway-bound jukebox musical was scheduled to start on May 28, 2020. Due to the COVID-19 pandemic, the world premiere performance at the Paper Mill Playhouse in New Jersey was rescheduled to March 24, 2022.

In November 2023, an invitation-only presentation (billed as "pre-Broadway") took place at New York City's Carroll Music Studios. In January 2026, Joshua Bassett (as Dion) led a NYC reading along with Olivia Holt (as Susan), Diego Andres Rodriguez (as Johnny), Tommy Bracco, Sarah Daniels, Morgan Dudley and Johnny Tammaro, among others. Steven Van Zandt, and his wife Maureen Van Zandt, also joined the producing team. In June 2026, actors from the show performed "Gonna Make It Alone" and "Ride with You" on Good Day New York, marking the first major TV spotlight for the production.

== Personal life ==
Dion has been married to Susan Butterfield since March 25, 1963. Their first daughter, Tane DiMucci, was born in 1966. Originally from New York City, they moved to Boca Raton, Florida in 1968. Dion and Susan DiMucci's second daughter, Lark, was born circa 1969. Their youngest daughter, August, was born circa 1974. Dion is a grandfather and a great-grandfather.

In the late 1990s, Dion visited his old Bronx parish, Our Lady of Mount Carmel, and returned to Catholicism. Sparking Dion's reversion to Catholicism was "a chance viewing of The Journey Home program on EWTN." As a practicing Roman Catholic and having struggled with a heroin addiction during his youth, Dion has been involved in prison religion, reaching out to men going through drug recovery. In 2009, he traced his detour into drugs and alcohol to the aftermath of the Buddy Holly plane crash: "You know they didn't have grief counseling in the Bronx. So what did I do? I drank, I took a little of this drug, a little of that drug... I tried to avoid the pain in so many ways, or the frustration or the confusion."

DiMucci was a member of the American board of directors for Renewal Ministries in 2004. He appeared on The Journey Home and discussed his wanderings from Catholicism to Protestantism and back again on May 1, 2006. In 2013, he received an honorary degree from Fordham University.

== Selected discography ==
With the Belmonts

- Presenting Dion and the Belmonts (1959)
- Wish Upon a Star with Dion and the Belmonts (1960)
- Together Again (1966)
- Live at Madison Square Garden 1972 (1973)

Solo albums

- Alone with Dion (1961)
- Runaround Sue (1961)
- Lovers Who Wander (1962)
- Donna the Prima Donna (1963)
- Dion (1968)
- Suite for Late Summer (1972)
- Born to Be with You (1975)
- Streetheart (1976)
- Return of the Wanderer (1978)
- I Put Away My Idols (1983)
- Yo Frankie (1989)
- Son of Skip James (2007)
- Tank Full of Blues (2011)
- New York Is My Home (2016)
- Blues with Friends (2020)
- Stomping Ground (2021)
- Girl Friends (2024)
- The Rock 'N' Roll Philosopher (2025)

== Film and television ==
In addition to Dion's music being used in numerous feature and documentary films, his multiple television performances include various daytime television talk shows, late-night talk shows and appearances in prime time episodes. Notable examples are: American Bandstand (performed songs such as "A Teenager in Love"), Teenage Millionaire (1961), Twist Around the Clock (1961), The Ed Sullivan Show (1962), Top of the Pops (performed "The Wanderer"), 100 Huntley Street (1985), Hill Street Blues (1986), the 30th Annual Grammy Awards (1988), The Pat Sajak Show (promoted Yo Frankie), The Oprah Winfrey Show (explained who "Runaround Sue" was), The John Larroquette Show (1993), A Little Help (2010), Conan (2016), The Tonight Show Starring Jimmy Fallon (performed "Ride with You" from Déjà Nu and New York Is My Home) and Stevie Van Zandt: Disciple (2024), among others.

"I Wonder Why" (1958) by Dion and the Belmonts has played on TV and during movies, including the supernatural film adaptation of Stephen King's novel Christine (1983), the crime film A Bronx Tale (1993), the pilot episode of The Sopranos television series (1999) and the thriller film Over Your Dead Body (2026). Nicolas Cage performed a cover version of the song in the film Peggy Sue Got Married (1986).

Ten Girls Ago (1962) was planned to be Dion's acting debut, but it was never finished due to production issues.

== Bibliography ==
- The Wanderer: Dion's Story (autobiography) co-authored with Davin Seay (1988)
- Chapters: Writing the Adventure of Your Life (self-help) co-authored with Andi Litt Wiener (1998)
- Dion: The Wanderer Talks Truth (Stories, Humor & Music) (non-fiction) co-authored with Mike Aquilina (2011)
- Dion: The Rock 'N' Roll Philosopher (biographical) co-written with Adam Jablin (2025)
