= No One Knows (Dion and The Belmonts song) =

Single by Dion and the Belmonts

from the album Presenting Dion and the Belmonts
- B-side: "I Can't Go On (Rosalie)"
- Released: July 1958
- Genre: Rock and roll
- Length: 2:36
- Label: Laurie
- Songwriter(s): Ernie Maresca, Ken Hecht

Dion and the Belmonts singles chronology
"I Wonder Why" (1958)	"No One Knows" (1958)	"Don't Pity Me" (1958)

"No One Knows" is a song written by Ernie Maresca and Ken Hecht and performed by Dion and the Belmonts. The song reached number 12 on the R&B chart and number 19 on the Billboard Hot 100 in 1958. It was featured on their 1958 album, Presenting Dion and the Belmonts.

== Other versions ==
- Marty Wilde released a version of the song as a single in November 1958.
- Mike LeRoy released a version of the song as the B-side to his single "I Forgot What It Was Like" in October 1964.

== In media ==
Dion and the Belmonts version was featured in the 1997 movie, The Butcher Boy, and featured on the soundtrack.
