= Suite for Late Summer =

Studio album by Dion
- Released: 1972
- Recorded: 1972
- Studio: Criteria Studios, North Miami, Florida; Sunset Sound, Hollywood; Warner Bros. Studios, Burbank, California
- Genre: Rock
- Length: 35:20
- Label: Warner Bros.
- Producer: Russ Titelman

Dion chronology
Sanctuary (1971)	Suite for Late Summer (1972)	Born to Be with You (1975)

Singles from Suite for Late Summer
- 1. "Running Close Behind You" Released: 1972

Suite for Late Summer is the 13th studio album by American singer-songwriter Dion. The album was released in 1972, by Warner Bros. Records.

== Track listing ==
All tracks composed by Dion DiMucci and Bill Tuohy; except where indicated

No.	Title	Writer(s)	Length
1.	"Soft Parade of Years"		3:00
2.	"Running Close Behind You"		3:06
3.	"Traveller in the Rain"		3:33
4.	"Tennessee Madonna"		3:36
5.	"Sea Gull"		4:08
6.	"Wedding Song"	Mike Birzon	3:12
7.	"Jennifer Knew"		3:51
8.	"Didn't You Change"		4:32
9.	"It All Fits Together"	Stuart Mitchell	3:07
10.	"To Dream Tomorrow"	Dion DiMucci	2:35
Total length:			35:20

== Personnel ==
- Dion DiMucci - lead vocals, guitar, harmonica
- John Clausi - lead guitar
- Sneaky Pete Kleinow - pedal steel guitar
- George Terry - bass guitar
- Nick DeCaro - organ, accordion, string arrangements
- David Robinson - drums
- Gary Coleman, Russ Titelman - percussion
- Gene Parsons - tenor guitar on "Traveller in the Rain", harmony vocals on "Running Close Behind You"
- Teri Bagby - backing vocals on "Soft Parade of Years"

Technical

- Al Schmitt, Chuck Kirkpatrick, Lee Herschberg - engineer
- Cal Schenkel - cover design
- Joel Brodsky - photography

== Charts ==
Chart (1972)	Peak position
US Billboard 200	197
