= Son of Skip James =

Studio album by Dion
- Released: November 6, 2007
- Studio: Sounds Great Production
- Genre: Blues
- Length: 43:35
- Label: Verve Forecast
- Producer: Dion

Dion chronology
Bronx in Blue (2006)	Son of Skip James (2007)	Tank Full of Blues (2011)

Son of Skip James is the thirtieth album by American singer/songwriter Dion. It was released on November 6, 2007, on the Verve Forecast Records label. The album stayed on the Billboard Blues Albums chart for twelve weeks, peaking at No. 4 on November 24, 2007.

The album serves as a follow-up to Dion's 2006 Grammy-nominated blues album, Bronx in Blue. The majority of tracks on Son of Skip James are cover versions of well-known blues songs, some of them classics. The album's title references blues legend Skip James, a friend of Dion's. Dion described the use of James's name for the album as "a kind of mission statement for the project".

== Critical reception ==
Son of Skip James
Review scores
Source	Rating
AllMusic	4/5 stars
The Philadelphia Inquirer	3.5/4 stars
PopMatters	7/10 stars
Standard-Speaker	9/10 stars

The album was generally positively received by critics, who called out its authenticity, simplicity, and emotional depth. The original tracks, particularly "The Thunderer", were considered to stand on equal or even superior footing to the cover tracks. Most critics agreed that Dion had effectively personalized the covers, although Tony Sclafani of PopMatters disagreed, calling the track selection "too familiar", and his recordings "too reverent" to bring the project fully to life. Martin Halo of JamBase highlighted Dion's dedication to researching the origins of the cover songs as part of what made the album distinctive among other blues cover albums.

Joel Selvin of SFgate.com called it "another landmark in a career littered with them". Thom Jurek, writing for AllMusic, called it "one of the best records of the year". Chris Jones of BBC Music called it "every inch the equal of its predecessor". Nick Cristiano of The Philadelphia Inquirer found it "exceptionally warm and intuitive". Despite his criticism of the track selection, Sclafani said the album "does not fall short when it comes to ass-kicking". Halo felt that the album featured "master musicianship and stunning vocals", but called it "nothing we haven’t heard before."

== Track listing ==
Except where noted, credits are adapted from AllMusic.

No.	Title	Original artist	Length
1.	"Nadine"	Chuck Berry	3:33
2.	"My Babe"	Willie Dixon	3:12
3.	"Hoodoo Man Blues"	Junior Wells	2:45
4.	"Drop Down Mama"	Sleepy John Estes	4:12
5.	"Hoochie Coochie Man"	Willie Dixon	4:00
6.	"Baby I'm in the Mood"	Bob Dylan	3:30
7.	"I'm a Guitar King"	Tommy McClennan	3:19
8.	"The Thunderer"	Dion (New song)	4:34
9.	"Interlude – Spoken Word"	Dion	0:38
10.	"Son of Skip James"	Dion (New song)	3:29
11.	"Preachin' Blues"	Robert Johnson	3:34
12.	"If I Had Possession (Over Judgement Day)"	Robert Johnson	3:50
13.	"Devil Got My Woman"	Skip James	2:59

== Personnel ==
Musicians

- Bob Guertin – audio engineer, organ, percussion
- Dion DiMucci – audio production, guitar, harmonica, producer, vocals
- Rick Krive – piano

Additional personnel

- Bill Bush – photography
- Susan DiMucci – photography
- Michael Friedman – photography
- Richard Gottehrer – executive producer
- Hollis King – art direction
- Emily Lazar – mastering
- Kazumi Matsumoto – graphic design
