= Drip Drop (Leiber and Stoller song) =

Single by Dion
- B-side: "No One's Waiting for Me"
- Released: October 29, 1963
- Genre: Doo-wop
- Length: 2:32
- Label: Columbia 42917
- Songwriter: Jerry Leiber and Mike Stoller
- Producer: Robert Mersey

Dion singles chronology
"Donna the Prima Donna" (1963)	"Drip Drop" (1963)	"Then I'll Be Tired of You" (1964)

"Drip Drop" is a song written by Jerry Leiber and Mike Stoller. It was first recorded by the Drifters in 1958, and more successfully by Dion in 1963.

== The Drifters ==
The Drifters released the original version of the song as a single in 1958. It reached number 58 on the Billboard Hot 100. The Drifters' version was produced by Leiber & Stoller and arranged by Ray Ellis.

== Dion ==
Dion's version of the song reached number 6 on the Billboard Hot 100 in 1963. The back-up group on the song is the Del-Satins, and the guitarist was Al Caiola. The song was produced and arranged by Robert Mersey.
