= Mindrocker (series) =

Compilation album series

Cover art of the complete series box set.

Mindrocker is an extensive series of compilation albums that was produced by the German record label Line Records (and later its subsidiary Impact Records) in the 1980s. The complete series compacted nearly 200 songs of rare, and obscure material primarily from American garage and psychedelic rock musical artists that were originally recorded in the 1960s, and previously made available to only a handful of collectors. It was organized by record producer Hans-Hermann Pohle, named after a single by California band, Fenwyck, and initially distributed in Germany. The first volume was released in 1981 and by 1986 the thirteenth and final installment of the series was issued.

Initially, Mindrocker was comparable to the popularity and specialization of the Pebbles series, however, with the ready availability of most of its material via digital means or specified anthologies, the series has not managed to endure as long as other relatable collections. Nonetheless, during its original run, Mindrocker was pivotal to the revival of garage rock. Most of the volumes were arranged to a certain region or record label, though some pieces of the series hold no such pattern. On December 9, 2008, the complete series was released on Mindrocker: The Complete Series, Vol. 1-13.

== Discography ==
- Mindrocker, Volume 1 (1981)
- Mindrocker, Volume 2 (1981)
- Mindrocker, Volume 3 (1982)
- Mindrocker, Volume 4 (1982)
- Mindrocker, Volume 5 (1982)
- Mindrocker, Volume 6 (1983)
- Mindrocker, Volume 7 (1983)
- Mindrocker, Volume 8 (1983)
- Mindrocker, Volume 9: Fourteen Rare Tracks (1984)
- Mindrocker, Volume 10: Twenty-eight Rare Tracks (1984)
- Mindrocker, Volume 11 (1984)
- Mindrocker, Volume 12 (1986)
- Mindrocker, Volume 13 (1986)
