= Born to Be with You (album) =

1975 studio album by Dion

Studio album by Dion
- Released: October 1975
- Recorded: 1970 ("Your Own Back Yard"); 1974 ("New York City Song" and the main album sessions)
- Length: 35:10
- Label: Phil Spector Records
- Producer: Phil Spector; Phil Gernhard; Cashman & West (uncredited)

Dion chronology
Suite for Late Summer (1972)	Born to Be with You (1975)	Streetheart (1976)

Professional ratings
Review scores
Source	Rating
AllMusic	4/5 stars

Born to Be with You is the fourteenth solo studio album by Dion, released in October 1975. Six of the eight tracks were produced by Phil Spector, who had expressed admiration of Dion's earlier work with his doo-wop group, Dion and the Belmonts.

Upon completion in 1974, Spector shelved the release for twelve months, only to find the album was met with indifference by the music establishment. However, in the 1990s, the album began to receive widespread critical acclaim. Artists such as Bobby Gillespie of Primal Scream cited it as a key influence.

The album was included in Robert Dimery's 1001 Albums You Must Hear Before You Die.

== Production ==
The recording sessions were lengthy and chaotic, often hampered by Spector's drinking and unpredictable temperament. Bruce Springsteen and Miami Steve visited the studio during the recording sessions. On its completion in 1974, Dion effectively disowned the record, stating that the production made it sound like "funeral music".

== Track listing ==
All tracks produced by Phil Spector, except where noted.

Side one
No.	Title	Writer(s)	Producer	Length
1.	"Born to Be with You"	Don Robertson		6:51
2.	"Make the Woman Love Me"	Barry Mann, Cynthia Weil		4:33
3.	"Your Own Back Yard"	Dion DiMucci, Tony Fasce	Phil Gernhard	3:50
4.	"(He's Got) The Whole World in His Hands"	Traditional; arranged by Spector and DiMucci		3:21

Side two
No.	Title	Writer(s)	Producer	Length
1.	"Only You Know"	Gerry Goffin, Spector		4:45
2.	"New York City Song"	DiMucci, William Tuohy	Terry Cashman and Tommy West	3:45
3.	"In and Out of the Shadows"	Goffin, Spector		4:18
4.	"Good Lovin' Man"	Spector, DiMucci, A.J. Bernstein		3:47

The 2001 Ace Records CD reissue, which pairs Born to Be with You with his 1976 album Streetheart, contains an additional Phil Spector-produced bonus track, "Baby, Let's Stick Together" (3:12, written by Spector and Jeff Barry), which had originally seen release in the UK only as a non-album single in 1976.

== Personnel ==
- Dion DiMucci – vocals, guitar
- Art Munson, Barney Kessel, Bill Perry, Dan Kessel, Dennis Budimir, Don Peake, Jerry Coe, Jesse Ed Davis, Ron Koss, Thom Rotella, Wally Snow – guitar
- Ray Neapolitan, Ray Pohlman, Klaus Voormann – bass guitar
- Andy Thomas, Barry Mann, Joe Sample, Mike Wofford, Tom Hensley – piano
- Hal Blaine, Frank Capp, Jim Keltner – drums
- Alan Estes, Emil Richards, Gary Coleman, Gene Estes, Jeff Barry, Steve Forman & Terry Gibbs – percussion
- Nino Tempo – saxophone & horn arrangements
- Bobby Keys, Conte Candoli, Don Menza, Fred Selden, Jay Migliori, Jim Horn, Steve Douglas – horns
- James Getzoff Strings – strings
