= The Wanderer (Dion song) =

1961 single by Dion

- US single cover

Single by Dion

from the album Runaround Sue
- A-side: "The Majestic"
- Released: November 1961
- Genre: Rhythm and blues; pop; rock and roll; doo-wop
- Length: 2:51
- Label: Laurie
- Songwriter: Ernie Maresca
- Producer: Gene Schwartz

Dion singles chronology
"Runaround Sue" (1961)	"The Wanderer" (1961)	"Lovers Who Wander" (1962)

"The Wanderer" is a song written by Ernie Maresca and originally recorded by Dion, released on his 1961 album, Runaround Sue. The song, with a 12-bar blues-base verse and an eight-bar bridge, tells the story of a travelling man and his many loves. The song is ranked number 243 on the Rolling Stone magazine's list of The 500 Greatest Songs of All Time.

== History ==
Maresca had co-written Dion's previous number-one hit, "Runaround Sue", but originally intended "The Wanderer" to be recorded by another group, Nino and the Ebb Tides. They passed on it in favor of another Maresca song, so Dion was given it as the B-side of his follow-up single, "The Majestic", a song which his record company had chosen for him. The record was turned over by radio DJs who preferred "The Wanderer", which duly entered the US charts in December 1961 and rose to number 2 in early 1962 (behind "Duke of Earl" by Gene Chandler). It also reached number 10 in the United Kingdom and number one in Australia.

The song was recorded with an uncredited background vocal group, the Del-Satins, in a rockier style than Dion's earlier hits with the Belmonts. The Del-Satins were an established doo-wop group led by Stan Ziska (later known as Stan Sommers), who at the time were also contracted to Laurie Records, and who later formed the core of Johnny Maestro & the Brooklyn Bridge. Musicians on the original recording included Bucky Pizzarelli and Johnny Falbo on guitars, Jerome Richardson on alto sax, Buddy Lucas on tenor sax, Milt Hinton on bass, and Panama Francis on drums.

Dion said of "The Wanderer":

At its roots, it's more than meets the eye. "The Wanderer" is black music filtered through an Italian neighborhood that comes out with an attitude. It's my perception of a lot of songs like "I'm A Man" by Bo Diddley or "Hoochie Coochie Man" by Muddy Waters. But you know, "The Wanderer" is really a sad song. A lot of guys don't understand that. Bruce Springsteen was the only guy who accurately expressed what that song was about. It's "I roam from town to town and go through life without a care, I'm as happy as a clown with my two fists of iron, but I'm going nowhere." In the Fifties, you didn't get that dark. It sounds like a lot of fun but it's about going nowhere.

However, on Maresca's original demo of the song, the lyrics were "with my two fists of iron and my bottle of beer", and the change to "with my two fists of iron but I'm going nowhere" in fact seems to have been at the record company's insistence.

The song has been categorized as rock and roll, rhythm and blues, pop, and doo-wop.

The 1961 recording by Dion was inducted into the Grammy Hall of Fame in 2017.

== Lawsuit ==
In 2015, the Bethesda Softworks game, Fallout 4, was released, and advertised via a live-action clip of the protagonist and his dog walking through a wasteland, with "The Wanderer" playing in the background. This had been fully licensed by Dion's label. However, Dion filed a lawsuit claiming he was not informed it would be licensed, saying that it "...featured repeated homicides in a dark, dystopian landscape, where violence is glorified as sport. The killings and physical violence were not to protect innocent life, but instead were repugnant and morally indefensible images designed to appeal to young consumers."

== Later versions ==
"The Wanderer"

Single by Status Quo
- B-side: "Can't Be Done"
- Released: 19 October 1984
- Length: 3:28
- Label: Rhino/Warner Records
- Songwriter: Ernie Maresca

Status Quo singles chronology
"Going Down Town Tonight" (1984)	"The Wanderer" (1984)	"Rollin' Home" (1986)

"The Wanderer"

Single by Eddie Rabbitt

from the album I Wanna Dance with You
- B-side: "Workin' Out"
- Released: April 1988
- Recorded: December 1987
- Genre: Country
- Length: 3:22
- Label: RCA Victor
- Songwriter: Ernie Maresca
- Producer: Richard Landis

Eddie Rabbitt singles chronology
"I Wanna Dance with You" (1988)	"The Wanderer" (1988)	"We Must Be Doin' Somethin' Right" (1988)

"The Wanderer" has been recorded by many other popular singers and bands, including Dee Snider, Gary Glitter, The Beach Boys, Leif Garrett (US number 49 in 1978), Bruce Springsteen, Delbert McClinton, and Dave Edmunds. Status Quo covered the song twice, once as a complete version, and once again as part of their Anniversary Waltz, Pt. 1. Status Quo's version was a number seven hit in the United Kingdom and a number three hit in Ireland in 1984; it was later included on the 2006 reissue of Back to Back. Eddie Rabbitt's version was a number one hit on Billboard's Hot Country Singles & Tracks chart in mid-1988.

In Sweden, Tonix made a version called "Kung i stan" (1978).

== Charts ==
=== Weekly charts ===
==== Dion version ====
Chart (1961–1962)	Peak position
Australia	1
Canada (CHUM Hit Parade)	6
New Zealand (Lever Hit Parade)	2
UK Singles (OCC)	10
US Billboard Hot 100	2
US Cash Box Top 100	3

=== Year-end charts ===
Chart (1962)	Rank
Australia	21
US Billboard Hot 100	12
US Cash Box	9

==== Status Quo version ====
Chart (1984)	Peak position
Belgium (Ultratop 50 Flanders)	9
Ireland (IRMA)	3
Netherlands (Single Top 100)	6
Switzerland (Schweizer Hitparade)	10
UK Singles (Official Charts)	7

Chart (1984)	Position
Netherlands (Dutch Top 40)	93
Netherlands (Single Top 100)	63

==== Eddie Rabbitt version ====
Chart (1988)	Peak position
US Hot Country Songs (Billboard)	1
Canadian RPM Country Tracks	1

Chart (1988)	Position
US Hot Country Songs (Billboard)	25

== Certifications ==
Region	Certification	Certified units/sales
New Zealand (RMNZ)	Gold	15,000^{‡}
United Kingdom (BPI)	Silver	200,000^{‡}
^{‡} Sales+streaming figures based on certification alone.

== See also ==
- Travelin' Man
