= Runaround Sue =

1961 single by Dion DiMucci

Single by Dion

from the album Runaround Sue
- B-side: "Runaway Girl"
- Released: September 1961
- Studio: Bell Sound (New York City)
- Genre: Rock and roll; doo wop; pop
- Length: 2:41
- Label: Laurie
- Songwriters: Dion DiMucci; Ernie Maresca
- Producer: Gene Schwartz

Dion singles chronology
"Somebody Nobody Wants" (1961)	"Runaround Sue" (1961)	"The Wanderer" (1961)

"Runaround Sue" is a rock and roll song (in a modified doo-wop style), originally a US No. 1 Hot 100 hit (No. 4 on the Hot R&B chart) for the singer Dion during 1961, after he split with the Belmonts. It was written by Dion with Ernie Maresca, and tells the story of a disloyal lover.

The song ranked No. 351 on the 2004 Rolling Stone list of "The 500 Greatest Songs of All Time".

In 2002, Dion was inducted into the Grammy Hall of Fame for "Runaround Sue".

On August 14, 2021, "Runaround Sue" peaked at No. 35 on the Billboard Digital Song Sales chart.

== Dion version ==
=== Writing and recording ===
According to Dion, he started to put the song together at an informal party for a friend's birthday, where he started improvising lyrics and encouraged his friends to add doo-wop background harmonies to a clapping rhythm. He then took the idea to his friend, budding songwriter Ernie Maresca, and they developed the tune and lyrics together. Having recently split with the Belmonts, Dion then discovered another vocal group, the Del-Satins, and they rehearsed the song. The co-owner of Laurie Records (Gene Schwartz) liked the song, and it was recorded in summer 1961 at Bell Sound Studios in New York City.

The lyrics are sung from the point of view of a man whose former girlfriend, named Sue, was extremely unfaithful. He warns all potential lovers to avoid her at all costs, as Sue "runs around" with every guy she meets and never settles down with any man in particular. He advises: "now people let me put you wise, Sue goes out with other guys" and suggests that potential suitors should "keep away from Runaround Sue".

Dion stated in his autobiography The Wanderer, that although his wife's name was Susan, "Runaround Sue" had nothing to do with her. Elsewhere he stated that the name Sue was of a girl he had admired from a distance, and that "her name fit the lyric line perfectly." However, during a 1990 interview with his wife on The Oprah Winfrey Show, they presented the story that the song was indeed about her. In the same autobiography, he stated that the inspiration for the song came from the song "Quarter to Three" by Gary U.S. Bonds, which had recently been released.

The musicians included:

- Teacho Wiltshire – piano
- Buddy Lucas – saxophone
- Mickey Baker – guitar
- Bucky Pizzarelli – rhythm guitar
- Milt Hinton – bass
- Panama Francis – drums

=== Chart performance ===
==== Weekly charts ====
Chart (1961–1962)	Peak position
Australia	2
Canada (CHUM)	1
New Zealand (Lever Hit Parade)	1
UK Singles (Official Charts)	11
US Billboard Hot 100	1

==== Year-end charts ====
Chart (1961)	Rank
U.S. Billboard	46

== Certifications ==
Region	Certification	Certified units/sales
New Zealand (RMNZ)	Platinum	30,000^{‡}
United Kingdom (BPI)	Silver	200,000^{‡}
^{‡} Sales+streaming figures based on certification alone.

== Leif Garrett cover ==
"Runaround Sue"

Single by Leif Garrett

from the album Leif Garrett
- B-side: "I Wanna Share a Dream with You"
- Released: November 1977
- Recorded: 1977
- Genre: Bubblegum pop
- Length: 2:24
- Label: Atlantic 3110
- Songwriters: Dion DiMucci; Ernie Maresca
- Producer: Michael Lloyd

Leif Garrett singles chronology
"Surfin' USA" (1977)	"Runaround Sue" (1977)	"Put Your Head on My Shoulder" (1978)

"Runaround Sue" was covered by then 15-year-old Leif Garrett in 1977. The song was the second of four releases from his debut album, all of which became U.S. chart hits. All four songs were covers of major hits from 1959 to 1963, including Dion's two biggest hits. Of the four, "Runaround Sue" was the most successful for Garrett. In early 1978, his version reached No. 13 on Billboard and No. 18 on Cash Box. The song also reached No. 15 in Canada.

On WLS in Chicago, "Runaround Sue" reached No. 1 for one week and was ranked at No. 42 for the year.

Garrett was born during the chart run of Dion's original version of "Runaround Sue," in the fall of 1961. Garrett's cover of the song hit the charts the week of his 16th birthday.

=== Chart performance ===
==== Weekly charts ====
Chart (1977–78)	Peak position
Australia (Kent Music Report)	8
Canada RPM Top Singles	15
Canada RPM Adult Contemporary	7
Germany (GfK)	19
New Zealand (RIANZ)	23
U.S. Billboard Hot 100	13
U.S. Billboard Adult Contemporary	48

==== Year-end charts ====
Chart (1978)	Rank
Australia (Kent Music Report)	70
Canada	119
U.S. Billboard Hot 100	101

== Other cover versions and samples ==
- An answer song "I'm No Run Around", with the same melody but different lyrics, was released in 1961 by Ginger Davis and the Snaps.
- Doug Sheldon's version reached No. 36 in the UK charts in 1961 (tailing behind "The Twist" at No. 32).
- Chubby Checker covered the song on his 1962 album For 'Teen Twisters Only.
- In 1962, Yugoslav group Bijele Strijele released the Serbo-Croatian cover of the song, entitled "Svi trče oko Sue".
- In 1963, Del Shannon covered the song on his album Little Town Flirt. Dion also covered Del Shannon's biggest solo hit, "Runaway", in 2008.
- In 1977, Australian group Ol' 55 covered the song on their album Fiveslivejive.
- In 1980, English group Racey released a cover version which reached No. 13 on the UK charts.
- John Cafferty and the Beaver Brown Band covered the song in 1983 for the movie Eddie and the Cruisers.
- Gary Glitter covered the song on C'mon... C'mon: The Gary Glitter Party Album (1997).
- G-Eazy sampled the song on his 2011 mixtape The Endless Summer.
- Human Nature covered the song on their 2014 album Jukebox.
- Roberto Carlos recorded a Portuguese version called "Fim de Amor".
- Houndmouth covered the song in their performance for KEXP.
- An answer song, entitled "Stay-At-Home Sue", was recorded by Linda Laurie.
- The Fratellis released a cover on the deluxe version of Half Drunk Under a Full Moon.
