= Donna the Prima Donna =

Single by Dion

from the album Donna the Prima Donna
- B-side: "You're Mine"
- Released: August 20, 1963
- Genre: Rock and roll
- Length: 2:47
- Label: Columbia Records 42852
- Songwriters: Dion DiMucci; Ernie Maresca
- Producer: Robert Mersey

Dion singles chronology
"Be Careful of Stones That You Throw" (1963)	"Donna the Prima Donna" (1963)	"Drip Drop" (1963)

"Donna the Prima Donna" is a song written by Dion DiMucci and Ernie Maresca and performed by Dion. It reached No. 6 on the Billboard Hot 100, No. 9 on the Cash Box Top 100, and No. 17 on Billboard's R&B chart in 1963, while reaching No. 17 on Canada's CHUM Hit Parade, #7 in New Zealand on the Lever Hit Parade and No. 2 in Hong Kong. It was from Dion's 1963 album, Donna the Prima Donna.

The track was produced by Robert Mersey and arranged by DiMucci. The backing group is the Del-Satins.

It was ranked No. 86 on Billboard magazine's Top Hot 100 songs of 1963. It references Zsa Zsa Gabor and how the titular girl tries to look like her.
