= Yo Frankie (album) =

Studio album by Dion
- Released: 1989
- Recorded: 1988
- Genres: Pop, rock and roll
- Label: Arista
- Producers: Dave Edmunds, Bryan Adams

Dion chronology
Velvet & Steel (1986)	Yo Frankie (1989)	Dream on Fire (1992)

Yo Frankie is an album by the American musician Dion, released in 1989. The album marked a popular comeback for Dion, who had spent much of the 1980s recording Christian music. Lou Reed, who had inducted Dion into the Rock and Roll Hall of Fame a couple of months prior to the release of Yo Frankie, was one of the many musicians who made guest appearances on the album.

The album peaked at No. 130 on the Billboard 200. The lead single, "King of the New York Streets", peaked at No. 74 on the UK Singles Chart in May 1989. "And the Night Stood Still" reached No. 16 on the Adult Contemporary chart and No. 75 on the Billboard Hot 100. "Written on the Subway Wall"/"Little Star" (featuring Paul Simon) peaked at No. 97 in October 1990.

== Production ==
The album was produced by Dave Edmunds. Dion cowrote many of its songs with the lyricist Bill Tuohy. Bryan Adams cowrote and produced "Drive All Night". A music video for "And the Night Stood Still" and "Written on the Subway Wall" (with Paul Simon) aired on MTV and VH1.

In 2021, Dion released a blues version of "I've Got to Get to You" on his album Stomping Ground.

== Critical reception ==
Professional ratings
Review scores
Source	Rating
AllMusic	3/5 stars
Chicago Tribune	3/4 stars
The Encyclopedia of Popular Music	3/5 stars
Hi-Fi News & Record Review	A/A*:1*
MusicHound R&B: The Essential Album Guide	3/5 stars
Orlando Sentinel	4/5 stars
Ottawa Citizen	4/5 stars
Record Collector	4/5 stars
Rolling Stone	3/5 stars
Vancouver Sun	4/4 stars

Rolling Stone called the album "merely pleasant, just like most of DiMucci’s post-Sixties solo work," writing that "it comes with all the spineless instrumentation and ersatz-doo-wop harmonies of a Huey Lewis single." The Ottawa Citizen thought that "every time the New Yorker returns, it is as a new rock and roll character, each more believable than the last and through each, offering a significant contribution to pop."

The Los Angeles Times wrote that "some of the tracks seem too polished and predictable, but the heart of the album—including the romantic innocence of 'And the Night Stood Still', the playful nostalgia of 'Written on the Subway Wall' and, especially, the wry introspection of 'King of the New York Streets'—bursts forth with a sense of triumph and survival." The Chicago Tribune lamented the album's "overproduction," but wrote that the opening track's "combination of street-tough attitude wrapped in churning guitars and razor-sharp lyrics is riveting."

AllMusic wrote that "the album fits together so well and coherently that the contemporary and the nostalgic elements merge seamlessly into a pleasing whole."

== Track listing ==
No.	Title	Length
1.	"King of the New York Streets"	4:50
2.	"And the Night Stood Still"	4:20
3.	"Yo Frankie (She's All Right With Me)"	3:35
4.	"I've Got to Get to You"	4:32
5.	"Written on the Subway Wall"/"Little Star"	3:54
6.	"Drive All Night"	3:00
7.	"Always in the Rain"	4:21
8.	"Loving You Is Killing Me"	3:39
9.	"Tower of Love"	4:18
10.	"Serenade"	4:16

== Personnel ==
- Dion – vocals, guitar
- Bryan Adams – backing vocals
- Phil Chen – bass
- Dave Edmunds – production, guitar
- Jim Horn – saxophone
- k.d. lang – backing vocals
- Chuck Leavell – keyboards
- Lou Reed – backing vocals
- Paul Simon – backing vocals
- Patty Smyth – backing vocals
- Terry Williams – drums
