= Lovers Who Wander (song) =

Single by Dion

from the album Lovers Who Wander
- B-side: "(I Was) Born to Cry"
- Released: April 14, 1962
- Genre: Pop; R&B
- Length: 2:20
- Label: Laurie
- Songwriter(s): Dion DiMucci, Ernie Maresca, Jay Campbell
- Producer(s): Donna Joan Productions

Dion singles chronology
"The Wanderer" (1961)	"Lovers Who Wander" (1962)	"Little Diane" (1962)

"Lovers Who Wander" is a popular song written by Dion DiMucci, Ernie Maresca and Jay Campbell. Recorded by Dion and released as a single in 1962, it reached No. 3 on the US Billboard Hot 100 chart.
