= Streetheart (Dion album) =

Studio album by Dion
- Released: 1976
- Studios: Sound Labs, Hollywood, California
- Label: Warner Bros.
- Producers: Steve Barri, Michael Omartian

Dion chronology
Born to Be with You (1975)	Streetheart (1976)	Return of the Wanderer (1978)

Streetheart is an album by the American singer/songwriter Dion, released in 1976 on Warner Bros. Records. It was a commercial failure.

== Critical reception ==
Professional ratings
Review scores
Source	Rating
AllMusic	3/5 stars
The Encyclopedia of Popular Music	3/5 stars
The Rolling Stone Album Guide	2/5 stars

Salon deemed the album "unshaped and undistinguished." AllMusic wrote that the album proved that Dion "still knew how to straddle his present and his past comfortably and effectively."

== Track listing ==
No.	Title	Writer(s)	Length
1.	"The Way You Do the Things You Do"	Smokey Robinson, Robert Rogers	3:50
2.	"Runaway Man"	Stormie Omartian, Michael Omartian	3:04
3.	"Queen Of '59"	Dion, Bill Tuohy	3:28
4.	"If I Can Just Get Through Tonight"	Peter Anders	3:28
5.	"More to You (Than Meets the Eye)"	Dion, Danny Grenier	2:57
6.	"You Showed Me What Love Is"	Ben Raleigh, Sam Fox	3:09
7.	"Hey My Love"	Mark Radice	3:20
8.	"Oh the Night"	Dion	4:34
9.	"I'll Give You All I've Got"	Thomas Cain	3:23
10.	"Lover Boy Supreme"	Dion, Tony Fasce	3:31
11.	"Streetheart"	Dion	5:23
Total length:			42:07

== Personnel ==
- Dion DiMucci - vocals, guitar
- Michael Omartian - keyboards, arrangements, conductor
- Lee Sklar - bass
- David Kemper - drums
- Dean Parks - guitar
- Victor Feldman, Gary Coleman, Steve Barri - percussion
- Ben Benay - guitar, harmonica
- Chuck Findley, Steve Madaio - trumpet
- Nino Tempo, Ernie Watts, Steve Douglas - woodwind
- Dick Hyde - trombone
- Nino Tempo - tenor saxophone solos
- Sid Sharp - string section concertmaster

Backing vocals

- Phil Everly - harmony on "Queen of ‘59"
- Oren Waters, Luther Waters - backing vocals on "You Showed Me What Love Is" and "The Way You Do the Things You Do"
- Stormie Omartian, Carolyn Willis, Ann White, Myrna Matthews - backing vocals on "More to You" and "Lover Boy Supreme"
- Jim Haas, Kerry Chater, Michael Omartian, Phil Everly - backing vocals

Production

- Basic rhythm tracks recorded at Sound Labs, Inc,
- Tommy Vicari - engineer
- Vocals, strings & horns mixed at ABC Recording Studios Inc.
- Phil Kaye - engineer
- Roger Nichols - assistant engineer
- Sam Emerson - photography
