= Ernie Maresca =

American singer-songwriter (1938–2015)

- Also known as: Artie Chicago (From The Bronx)
- Born: Ernest Peter Maresca; August 21, 1938; The Bronx, New York, United States
- Died: July 8, 2015 (aged 76) Florida, US
- Genres: Rock and roll, pop, doo-wop
- Occupations: Singer, songwriter, record label executive
- Years active: 1957–1968 (as performer)
- Labels: Seville; Laurie; Columbia

Ernest Peter Maresca (August 21, 1938 – July 8, 2015) was an American singer, songwriter and record company executive, best known for writing or co-writing some of Dion's biggest hits, including "Runaround Sue" and "The Wanderer".

== Biography ==
Maresca was born in the Bronx, New York. He began singing and writing in a doo-wop group, the Monterays, later renamed as the Desires, and, after Maresca left, as the Regents, who had a hit with "Barbara Ann". In 1957, his demo of his song "No One Knows" came to the attention of Dion DiMucci, who recorded it successfully with the Belmonts on Laurie Records, the record reaching No. 19 on the Billboard Hot 100 record chart in 1958. Maresca then began songwriting full-time, and recording his own demos. He wrote "Runaround Sue" with Dion (the singer's only US number one hit), and then other big hits with and for him. These included "The Wanderer", originally a B-side which became a US million seller and a UK hit twice over, in 1962 and 1976 on reissue; the song was also a hit for Leif Garrett, Status Quo (in the UK), and Eddie Rabbitt for whom it was a number one country hit in 1988. Maresca also co-wrote Dion's follow-up hits, "Lovers Who Wander"; and "Donna the Prima Donna".

In 1961, Maresca was offered a recording contract with Seville, a small New York label. His protestations that he was not much of a singer were brushed aside, and he wrote a hit for himself, "Shout! Shout! (Knock Yourself Out)", which reached number 6 on the Billboard Hot 100 chart in early 1962 and was number one in Canada for three weeks.. The song was recorded in 1982 by Rocky Sharpe and the Replays, whose version made number 19 on the UK singles chart. Maresca continued to record, with less success, for the remainder of the 1960s, both under his own name and using the pseudonym Artie Chicago (From The Bronx), including his own version of "The Wanderer" in 1968.

He had greater success as a writer, with hits including "Runaround" by the Regents, "Whenever a Teenager Cries" by Reparata and the Delrons, "Hey Dean, Hey Jean" by Dean & Jean, and "Party Girl" by Bernadette Carroll. He also wrote, along with Jimmy Curtiss, the Jimmie Rodgers 1967 comeback (and last) hit, "Child of Clay". By the 1970s he was head of Laurie Records' publicity department, and continued as a record company executive. In 1992 he was responsible for selling the Laurie catalogue to Capitol Records on behalf of Laurie's founders Gene and Bob Schwartz, and Eliot Greenberg. He continued to work until the 2000s, as a consultant to EMI and administrator of Laurie's publishing.

Ernie Maresca died on July 8, 2015, at his home in South Florida, after a brief illness at the age of 76.

== Discography ==
=== Singles ===
Year	Title	Peak chart positions			Record Label	B-side	Album
Year	Title	US Pop	US R&B	CAN	Record Label	B-side	Album
1960	"I Don't Know Why"	—	—	—	Seville	"Lonesome Blues"	
1962	"Shout! Shout! (Knock Yourself Out)"	6	25	1	Seville	"Crying Like a Baby Over You"	Shout! Shout! (Knock Yourself Out)
1962	"Mary Jane"	—	—	—	Seville	"Down on the Beach"	Shout! Shout! (Knock Yourself Out)
1962	"Something to Shout About"	—	—	—	Seville	"How Many Times?"	
1963	"Love Express"	—	—	—	Seville	"Lorelei"	
1963	"The Rovin' Kind"	—	—	—	Seville	"Please Be Fair"	
1964	"The Beetle Dance"	—	—	—	Rust	"Theme From Lily, Lily"	
1965	"It's Their World"	—	—	—	Seville	"I Can't Dance"	
1966	"The Good Life"	—	—	—	Laurie	"A Bum Can't Cry"	
1966	"Rockin' Boulevard Street"	—	—	—	Providence	"Am I Better off Than Them"	
1967	"My Son"	—	—	—	Laurie	"My Shadow and Me"	
1968	"What Is a Marine"	—	—	—	Laurie	"The Night My Papa Died"	
1969	"Blind Date"	—	—	—	Laurie	"People Get Jealous"	
1969	"The Spirit of Woodstock (Remains in America Today)"	—	—	—	Laurie	"Web of Love"	

=== As composer ===
- Dion: "Runaround Sue", "The Wanderer", "Lovers Who Wander"; and "Donna the Prima Donna"
- Dion and the Belmonts: "No One Knows"
- The Belmonts: "Come On Little Angel"
- The Regents: "Runaround"
- Dean & Jean: "Seven Day Wonder", "Hey Dean, Hey Jean"
- Bernadette Carroll: "Party Girl"
- Jimmie Rodgers: "Child of Clay"
