= Laurie Records =

New York City-based record label

- Parent company: Capitol Music Group/Universal Music Group
- Founded: March 1958
- Founder: Robert Schwartz; Gene Schwartz; Allan I. Sussel
- Genre: Pop, rock
- Country of origin: U.S.
- Location: New York City

Laurie Records was an American record label established in New York City in 1958, by brothers Robert and Gene Schwartz, and Allan I. Sussel. Among the recording artists on Laurie's roster were Dion and the Belmonts (both together and as separate acts), The Chiffons, The Jarmels, The Mystics, Bobby Goldsboro, and The Royal Guardsmen.

== History ==
Sussel's earlier record company, Jamie Records (named after his elder daughter), had been unsuccessful, and as a result, Sussel (1924–2003) joined forces with Gene Schwartz (1920–1999) to found Laurie Records, named after his other daughter, Laura Sue Sussel. By the early 1960s, Elliot Greenberg, an arranger and friend of Schwartz's, gained a 12% ownership of the company, and Gene's younger brother Bob Schwartz also became involved. Songwriter Ernie Maresca also played an active role in the company. The company grew to include subsidiary labels, most notably Andie Records, named after Sussel's youngest daughter, Andrea Jo Sussel; it later changed its name to Rust Records.

Dion and the Belmonts were responsible for the first of Laurie's hit singles with their 1958 doo-wop song, "I Wonder Why". Using top New York session musicians in leading recording studios, and produced by Gene Schwartz, Dion and the Belmonts had several national hits on Laurie. When Dion started a solo career, the hits on Laurie continued with "Runaround Sue" and "The Wanderer". The label had continuing success especially with the Chiffons ("He's So Fine" and "One Fine Day", both 1963), and the Royal Guardsmen ("Snoopy vs. the Red Baron", 1966). Then, with Dion's return to the company after several years with Columbia, he had further success with "Abraham, Martin and John" (1968). The company also licensed English records during the British Invasion period, including "Don't Let the Sun Catch You Crying" (1964) and "Ferry Cross the Mersey" (1965) by Gerry and the Pacemakers. Jo Siopis, a well known record producer and wife of Gerry & the Pacemakers' bass player, Les Chadwick, was instrumental in the distribution of Laurie Records albums in the United States.

Being a small independent record label, Laurie's chart successes usually occurred one at a time and, for the most part, with one-off hits, as was the case with the Mystics, Randy & the Rainbows, and the Jarmels. Another sizable hit for the label was the controversial song "Once You Understand", written and produced by the songwriting team of Lou Stallman and Bobby Susser and released by the duo in 1971 under the pseudonym Think. In 1966, Laurie released a psychedelic single, "Charity" by the Gray Things, which appears on multiple compilation albums, including Mindrocker, a 13-CD anthology of US 1960s psychedelic recordings released in Germany in 1982. "Charity" was issued in limited quantities.

The label also distributed records under several subsidiary labels, including Rust, Legrand, Calico, President, Providence, Dolphin (not to be confused with the Liberty-owned Dolphin/Dolton label).

Laurie changed its name in the early 1980s to 3C Records. 3C stands for Continental Communications Corporation and the master recordings that 3C produced are owned by the Capitol Records unit of Universal Music Group.

== Label variations ==
The label variations for Laurie singles were of three types: First, a grey label with Laurie Records written across the top. This was used for first release only, #3013. It then changed to a sky blue label, with the same basic printing of Laurie Records, from #3013 thru #3020. After the first few singles had been released, it changed to the typically recognized label of four red corners with the black square at the hole punch, with Laurie written at the top, from #3021 onward. Of those earlier releases, only #3013 and #3015, both releases by Dion & the Belmonts, were regular re-issues as part of the more familiar label design.

== Laurie Records artists ==
- Joe Allegro
- The Balloon Farm
- Bill Sunkel (Laurie Records / 3C Records)
- The Bon-Aires (Rust Records)
- Jack Rainwater
- The Barbarians
- The Birdwatchers
- Mara Lynn Brown
- Jim Campbell
- Carlo (Carlo Mastrangelo)
- California (featuring Les Fradkin)
- The Chiffons (who also recorded as The Four Pennies on Rust Records)
- The Clique
- Church Street Five (Legrand Records)
- Gary U.S. Bonds (Legrand Records)
- Dean & Jean (Rust Records)
- Dion and the Belmonts
- Dion
- The Equals (President Records)
- The Fallen Angels
- The Gap (1965–1972) – Ronnie Logue, Ronnie Banks and Ben Johnson
- The New Gap (1971–1979)
- Gerry and the Pacemakers
- Bobby Goldsboro
- Rocco Granata
- Heavy Breathing
- The Jarmels
- Don Lombardi
- Lou Monte
- The Music Explosion (band leader Jamie Lyons also recorded for Laurie)
- The Mystics
- Randy & the Rainbows (Rust Records)
- Rats
- Reparata and the Delrons
- Ivo Robić
- The Royal Guardsmen
- The Gray Things
- The Sound Investment
- Tom Selden
- The Tropics
- Uncalled For
- Valerie Tyler
- Don Benjamin
- Wigren and Drago
- Think
- Barbara M
- New Hope
- Montage
- The Yellow Brick Road
- The Outsiders (as The Soul Trippers on Providence Records)
- Raven (Formerly The Ravens, from St. Petersburg, Florida)

== See also ==
- List of record labels
