= List of The Muppet Show episodes =

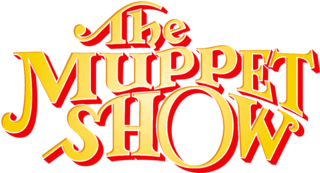

The Muppet Show is a live-action/puppet television series that was created by Jim Henson and produced by ITC Entertainment and Henson Associates. It premiered on 5 September 1976 and ended on 15 March 1981, with a total of 120 episodes over the course of 5 seasons.

The rights to the series are currently owned by the Muppets Studio (a division of the Walt Disney Company), having been acquired from the Jim Henson Company in February 2004.

The 120 episodes were produced in the UK between 1976 and 1980; two pilot episodes were also produced, one in 1974 and the other in 1975. The UK broadcasts featured extra scenes that were not seen on US TV. There is no set broadcast order for the episodes, as they were shown in varying order in different regions. For the Season One DVD box set that was released in 2005, Buena Vista Home Entertainment placed the episodes in the order in which they were produced, rather than aired, for this reason. Due to the sequence in which the episodes are organized on DVD disc 1, Scooter is part of the backstage staff before his first appearance (Jim Nabors episode). The set also includes the longer UK versions of each of the episodes, though six song sequences were cut from the set because of licensing issues. Examples include the Vincent Price episode, the closing number of which, "You've Got a Friend", is cut on The Muppet Show: Season One DVD; it is available uncut and in English on the German DVD.

The tables below list episodes based on their initial airing dates, for the United Kingdom, except for the two pilots. Thus they may not necessarily be the order in which episodes were shown in all regions.

The Muppet Show was released for streaming on Disney+ on 19 February 2021. However, two episodes featuring guests Brooke Shields and Chris Langham are omitted from the streaming service; the former due to music licensing issues, and the latter possibly due to Langham's charges of downloading and possessing child pornography. In several European countries, the episode featuring John Denver is omitted as well.

== Series overview ==
Series	Episodes	Originally released	
Series	Episodes	First released	Last released
Pilots	2	30 January 1974	3 March 1975
1	24	5 September 1976	19 February 1977
2	24	16 September 1977	12 March 1978
3	24	19 March 1978	9 March 1979
4	24	24 October 1979	4 February 1980
5	24	5 October 1980	15 March 1981
Special	1	4 February 2026	

== Episodes ==
=== Pilots (1974–1975) ===
The first pilot opens with a character called Wally and develops as he types the script on his typewriter. In the second pilot, a new character called Nigel acts as the backstage boss. Statler and Waldorf grumble from a living room while watching the show on television. (This setting for Statler and Waldorf would be revisited in the first series of Muppets Tonight.) In both pilot episodes, Kermit the Frog only plays a supporting role.

No.	Title	Original release date
P.01	"The Muppets Valentine Show"	30 January 1974
The first Muppet Show pilot, starring Mia Farrow. The hosting duties are attended to by a character called Wally. Other characters include George the Janitor, Mildred Huxtetter, Droop, Brewster, and "Crazy Donald" (called Crazy Harry in later episodes). Kermit the Frog has a supporting role. Most of the remaining characters appearing were from previous Jim Henson productions.
P.02	"The Muppet Show: Sex and Violence"	3 March 1975
A second pilot episode for The Muppet Show. Viewers got glimpses of several of the future Muppet stars. Although Kermit does appear briefly, the backstage boss of this variety show is Nigel, the show's future band leader. Miss Piggy makes a brief appearance in a parody of Planet of the Apes and the Twilight Zone episode "Eye of the Beholder". Meanwhile, personifications of a variety of sins romp around backstage, waiting for auditions for The Seven Deadly Sins Pageant. Debuting are Dr. Teeth and the Electric Mayhem, The Swedish Chef, Sam the Eagle, and Statler and Waldorf, grumbling from a living room instead of a theatre box.

=== Season 1 (1976–1977) ===
Kermit the Frog becomes the host for the show from the start of the first season, while former host Nigel gets a part as the orchestra leader. Statler and Waldorf now watch the show from a box seat, stage left. Other characters from the pilots, including Dr. Teeth and the Electric Mayhem, Sam the Eagle, The Swedish Chef, George the Janitor, Mildred Huxtetter, Crazy Harry, Brewster, and Droop continue to make appearances. Characters from previous Jim Henson productions also make appearances, including Rowlf the Dog, Sweetums and Robin the Frog (from The Frog Prince), Miss Piggy, Gonzo the Great, and Thog (from The Great Santa Claus Switch). New characters include Fozzie Bear, The Muppet Newsman, Scooter, Dr. Bunsen Honeydew, wardrobe lady Hilda, Uncle Deadly, Marvin Suggs and his Muppaphones, Trumpet Girl, and the singing duet of Wayne and Wanda. Recurring sketches include "Veterinarian's Hospital", "At the Dance", "Talking Houses", "Panel Discussions", "Fozzie's Monologue", "Talk Spot", "Muppet Labs" and "Gonzo's Act".

No.	Guest star	Original release date	Prod. code
1.01 (1)	Joel Grey	5 September 1976	103
Song: "Comedy Tonight" (from the musical A Funny Thing Happened on the Way to the Forum) by the Frackles and the Whatnot Criminals.; Backstage: Fozzie's jokes on any subject.; At the Dance: Family Jokes.; Muppet News Flash: Boffo the Human Cannonball. (Cut in Season One DVD and German versions); Guest Act: "Willkommen".; Talk Spot: Joel's life story.; Song: "Pachalafaka" from the album The Whimsical World of Irving Taylor.; Wayne and Wanda: "Stormy Weather". (Cut in Season One DVD version); Blackout: Joel has a new hat and a new car and offers to take Gonzo for a spin, but Gonzo takes him literally, so Joel tries to explain to him about "figures of speech". He explains that one does not bite the hand that feeds him, nor does one talk through one's hat. The hat suddenly starts talking and Joel believes he must be going bananas. A banana pops up and says, "I thought you were going for a spin."; Fozzie's Act: Jokes on any subject.; UK Spot: Sherlock Holmes and the Case of the Disappearing Clues. (Cut in Nickelodeon airing); Muppet News Flash: Brooklyn is held hostage by a retired bus driver. (Cut in season one DVD and German versions); Gonzo's Act: Destroying a vintage automobile to the "Anvil Chorus".; Guest Act: "Razzle Dazzle" from the musical Chicago.; Note: In the Nickelodeon airing, the "Stormy Weather" number was moved to after the second Muppet News Flash segment.
1.02 (2)	Rita Moreno	12 September 1976	105
Backstage: Telephone running gag.; Guest Act: French Tango dance to "I Get Ideas". (Cut in Nickelodeon airing); Veterinarian's Hospital: Dr. Bob operates on Fozzie.; Muppet News Flash: Chicken dances ballet.; Swedish Chef: Swedish Chef makes pancakes.; At the Dance: Shark in the ballroom.; UK Spot: "To Morrow".; Song: "Lady of Spain" by Marvin Suggs and his Muppophones.; Panel Discussion: Is conversation a dying art?; Muppet News Flash: 'There is no news tonight'.; Talk Spot: Cue Cards.; Wayne and Wanda: "Goody Goody".; Fozzie's Act: "Charlton Heston doesn't tell jokes."; Guest Act: "Fever". (Moved up to before the Veterinarian's Hospital segment in Nickelodeon airing)
1.03 (3)	Sandy Duncan	19 September 1976	114
Backstage: Kermit wants to know what the banana sketch is.; Guest Act: "A Nice Girl Like Me".; Swedish Chef: Doughnut.; Fozzie's Act: The banana sketch.; At the Dance: Falling for you.; Guest Act: Sandy makes Sweetums feel beautiful.; UK Spot: "Nobody" by Gonzo and Rowlf.; Song: "Never Smile at a Crocodile" by Mary Louise (Whatnot version) featuring the Crocodile and some Frogs.; Talk Spot: The banana sketch.; Muppet News Flash: Jumping in place record.; Veterinarian's Hospital: Dr. Bob's first transplant.; Guest Act: "Try to Remember".
1.04 (4)	Jim Nabors	26 September 1976	106
Backstage: Scooter's first day.; Song: "Money" by Dr. Teeth.; Guest Act: "Gone with the Wind". (Cut in Season One DVD version); Muppet News Flash: Flying saucer lands at gas station.; Sketch: The Danceros dancing to "Bye Bye Blues". (Cut in Season One DVD version); Blackout: Nabors wishes Animal luck by telling him to "break a leg." Animal complies by hitting him with a hammer.; At the Dance: Health.; UK Spot: "Dog Eat Dog".; Talk Spot: Astrological signs.; Wayne and Wanda: "Indian Love Call".; Fozzie's Act: 'If you don't laugh, I'll never come back'.; Guest Act: Nabors works bakery security.; Guest Act: "Thank God I'm a Country Boy".
1.05 (5)	Ruth Buzzi	3 October 1976	104
Backstage: Wind-up TV Show Host.; Song: "Sunny" by Electric Mayhem.; At the Dance: "I Have Three Feet".; Wayne and Wanda: "Row, Row, Row".; Muppet News Flash: The Atlantic Ocean has been kidnapped. (Cut in Nickelodeon airing); Guest Act: "Can't Take My Eyes Off You"; UK Spot: "I Never Harmed an Onion".; Talk Spot: Buzzi hates fat but loves to eat.; Fozzie's Act: Greatest straight man in the business.; Guest Act: Buzzi breaks her torturers down under pressures.; Song: "You Can't Rollerskate in a Buffalo Herd".; Panel Discussion: Is the human body obsolete?
1.06 (6)	Paul Williams	10 October 1976	108
Backstage: Fozzie and Scooter prepare to do the telephone pole bit.; Song: "All of Me". (Cut in Season One DVD version); Guest Act: "An Old Fashioned Love Song" with two Muppet likenesses of Williams.; Muppet Labs: All-purpose tenderiser. (Cut in Nickelodeon airing); Sketch: "Silence", a poem by Rowlf.; Blackout: Williams discloses that one of the reasons he chose to be on the show was so he could finally be the tallest person on the show...until he meets three Muppets who are taller than him.; At the Dance: "You wanna take a trip?"; UK Spot: "I'm in Love with a Big Blue Frog" by Mary Louise (Whatnot version) featuring a chorus of frogs, including Kermit and Robin.; Talk Spot: Famous short people.; Guest Act: "Got anything cheaper?" sketch (with Beautiful Day Monster).; Wayne and Wanda: "You Do Something to Me".; Muppet News Flash: 'I picked up the phone and there was no one there'.; Fozzie's Act: The telephone pole bit (with Scooter).; Guest Act: "Sad Song". (Edited in Disney+ version)
1.07 (7)	Florence Henderson	17 October 1976	107
Backstage: Piggy comes on to Kermit. (Second backstage scene cut in Nickelodeon airing); Sketch: The Bouncing Borsalino Brothers.; Guest Act: "Elusive Butterfly".; At the Dance: "We're engaged!"; Talk Spot: Piggy threatens Henderson.; UK Spot: "Cottleston Pie".; Panel Discussion: Was William Shakespeare, in fact, Bacon?; Fozzie's Act: Impressions of great actors.; Guest Act: "Happy Together".; Blackout: Sweetums tells Florence he could really fall for her, and literally does so.; Sketch: Love comes to Koozebane.
1.08 (8)	Peter Ustinov	24 October 1976	112
Backstage: Kermit is jealous of Ustinov.; Song: "Pizzicato" from the ballet Sylvia.; Muppet Labs: Robot Politician.; At the Dance: Punch Bowl.; Guest Act: Economics sketch.; UK Spot: "(Hey Won't You Play) Another Somebody Done Somebody Wrong Song".; Song: "You Do Something to Me".; Muppet News Flash: Cure for the common cold.; Wayne and Wanda: "Autumn Leaves".; Panel Discussion: Psychiatry; Song: "Bein' Green".
1.09 (9)	Lena Horne	31 October 1976	111
Backstage: Piggy won't be performing this week.; Song: "Rag Mop".; Guest Act: "I Got a Name".; Muppet News Flash: Woman has eaten nothing but seaweed.; At the Dance: "You're always blowing your top".; UK Spot: "(Where Do I Begin?) Love Story" duet by Zoot and Rowlf.; Talk Spot: Fozzie wants to talk to the guest stars.; Swedish Chef: Spaghetti.; Gonzo's Act: Unique version of "Pop Goes the Weasel".; Guest Act: "I'm Glad There Is You".; Fozzie's Act: Tribute to Marcel Marceau.; Guest Act: "Sing".
1.10 (10)	Harvey Korman	7 November 1976	110
Song: "Love Ya to Death" by Electric Mayhem.; Sketch: Interview with Animal.; Guest Act: Harvey trains a dangerous animal.; Panel Discussion What is the meaning of life?; At the Dance: Guy has swelled head.; Backstage: Rowlf and Muppy suggest their worries of ecology to Harvey: with no trees, the dogs are in trouble. (Cut in Odyssey Network airing).; UK Spot: "Jam" by Electric Mayhem.; Talk Spot: Harvey's the token human on the show. To compensate for this, he is dressed up in a chicken suit.; Veterinarian's Hospital: Dr. Bob's nerves are getting to him.; Wayne and Wanda: "I Get a Kick out of You". (Cut in Nickelodeon airing); Blackout: T.R. leads the chickens, including a chicken suit-clad Harvey, in a march.; Fozzie's Act: "Good grief, the comedian's a bear!"; Muppet News Flash: Boxer will defend title against himself.; Song: "Halfway Down the Stairs" by Robin.
1.11 (11)	Candice Bergen	14 November 1976	115
Backstage: Objects for Kermit running gag. (Last scene cut in Nickelodeon airing); Song: "What Now My Love?".; Guest Act: "Put Another Log on the Fire".; At the Dance: George pops the question.; Panel Discussion Does traveling broaden the mind?; UK Spot: "It's Not Where You Start, It's Where You Finish" by Rowlf.; Talk Spot: Candice takes Kermit's picture.; Swedish Chef: Hot Sauce.; Guest Act: "Look at That Face".; Veterinarian's Hospital: Frog in the throat.; Guest Act: "You've Got to Have Friends".
1.12 (12)	Ben Vereen	21 November 1976	117
Backstage: Fozzie gets locked in a magician's box; Running Gag: Crazy Harry explodes things, resulting in Vereen dangling from the rafters.; Guest Act: "Jump, Shout, Knock Yourself Out".; Guest Act: "Mr. Cellophane" (from the musical Chicago).; Muppet News Flash: Flagpole sitting record. (Cut in Nickelodeon airing); At the Dance: The rolling stones.; UK Spot: "Für Elise".; Talk Spot: Dancers have to keep in shape.; Blackout: Ben tells Hilda he's getting a big charge from the show, prompting Crazy Harry to make another explosion.; Veterinarian's Hospital: Dr. Bob plays in the operating room.; Wayne and Wanda: "I'll Know".; Fozzie's Act: Fozzie in a box.; Guest Act: Ben sings "Pure Imagination" to Droop.; Statler's reaction to his pants catching fire in the epilogue is omitted from the Disney+ showing; this did not appear in the original US broadcasts, but did remain intact in international airings.
1.13 (13)	Charles Aznavour	28 November 1976	109
Backstage: Scooter becomes Gonzo's manager.; Song: "Tonight" and "I Feel Pretty".; Guest Act: "The Old Fashioned Way". (Cut in Season One DVD version); Veterinarian's Hospital: The patient is dead.; At the Dance: Bananas have appeal.; UK Spot: "Does Your Chewing Gum Lose Its Flavour (On the Bedpost Overnight?)".; Talk Spot: French, the language of love.; Panel Discussion: What is man's role in the universe?; Fozzie's Act: "Look out!"; Guest Act: "Inchworm".
1.14 (14)	Phyllis Diller	5 December 1976	118
Backstage: Hilda considers ways to make herself look younger.; Song: "Mississippi Mud".; Guest Act: Phyllis and Rowlf discuss what losers they are.; Muppet News Flash: Woman flies to Dallas.; At the Dance: Statler and Waldorf join the dance.; UK Spot: "Ol' Lazybones" by the Electric Mayhem.; Talk Spot: Fozzie gets comedy tips.; Song: "Hugga Wugga"/"You Are My Sunshine".; Muppet Labs: Exploding hats. (Cut in Nickelodeon airing); Blackout: Phyllis has a pocket camera, and Gonzo asks what pictures she took. They were of pockets.; Veterinarian's Hospital: Loaf of bread.; Guest Act: "The Entertainer".
1.15 (15)	Avery Schreiber	12 December 1976	116
Backstage: Piggy tries to make Kermit jealous. (Scene after Muppet Labs segment cut in Nickelodeon airing); Song: "Tenderly" by the Electric Mayhem.; Guest Act: Sir Avery versus the monster of the moor.; Muppet Labs: Gorilla detector.; Guest Act: Avery as museum security guard.; At the Dance: Boogie! Boogie Boogie!; UK Spot: "May You Always Walk in Sunshine".; Talk Spot: Piggy continues to flirt with Avery.; Wayne and Wanda: "Some Enchanted Evening".; Veterinarian's Hospital: Series of bird jokes.; Fozzie's Act: Banana in the ear gag.; Muppet News Flash: "There is no news tonight."; Guest Act: Nonsense sound song.
1.16 (16)	Twiggy	19 December 1976	121
Backstage: Gang encounters Phantom of the Muppet Show.; Song: "Dance".; Guest Act: "In My Life". (Replaced with Mary Roos performing "Lean on Me" with the Muppets in German airings); Wayne and Wanda: "Let it Snow, Let it Snow, Let it Snow".; Guest Act: "The King's Breakfast".; At the Dance: Chandelier.; UK Spot: "Minuet in G Major".; Sketch: Vendaface. (Cut in Nickelodeon airings); Muppet News Flash: Mrs. Thomas ate a diesel tractor.; Guest Act: "Ain't Nobody's Business But My Own".
1.17 (17)	Valerie Harper	2 January 1977	120
Backstage: Statler is determined to meet Valerie and brings her a rapidly growing African berry bush.; Guest Act: Valerie convinces Kermit to let her do the opening act by singing "Broadway Baby".; Swedish Chef: Chef decorates a cake, then smashes it.; Muppet News Flash: Steam fitter turns into a rug.; Rowlf's Act: Rowlf reads poem "The Butterfly".; At the Dance: Bat attack.; UK Spot: Rowlf and Sam sing "Tit-willow" (from The Mikado).; Song: Floyd sings "Searchin'".; Wayne and Wanda: "On a Clear Day You Can See Forever".; Muppet News Flash: Dateline nothing.; Guest Act: Valerie dances with the Clodhoppers to "Nobody Does It Like Me".
1.18 (18)	Mummenschanz	9 January 1977	124
Backstage: Gonzo pesters Miss Piggy for her attention.; Song: Floyd, Scooter and the gang sing "Mr. Bass Man".; Guest Act: Mummenschanz performs mime with notepad masks.; Sketch: A librarian turns a cacophony of various library noises (e.g. chewing gum, coughing, rustling paper, and nose-blowing) into a performance of "The Blue Danube".; Guest Act: Mummenschanz performs crawly creatures.; At the Dance: Blow my top.; UK Spot: "When I'm Not Near the Fish I Love" sung by a fish in an aquarium.; Talk Spot: Mummenschanz show Kermit that you don't have to speak to communicate.; Wayne and Wanda: "It's Only a Paper Moon". (Cut in Nickelodeon airing); Vendaface: Statler gets a punch in the face.; Muppet News Flash: Russia's oldest living human. (Cut in Nickelodeon airing); Guest Act: Mummenschanz performs mime with clay masks.
1.19 (19)	Juliet Prowse	16 January 1977	101
Backstage: Scooter and Muppy convince Kermit to allow them to do a number and then make various demands.; Song: "Mahna Mahna" by Mahna Mahna and the Snowths.; Gonzo's Act: Eating a tire to "Flight of the Bumblebee".; Guest Act: Juliet Prowse dances to the second half of Scott Joplin's "Solace".; At the Dance: "Mind if I smoke?"; UK Spot: "You and I and George".; Talk Spot: Juliet Prowse of Frogs.; Sketch: "Cowboy Time": Kid Fozzie Comes to Town.; Blackout: What's red, long, fuzzy, and has one eye and sharp teeth?; Song: Scooter sings "Simon Smith and the Amazing Dancing Bear" while Fozzie dances.; Song: "Temptation" by the Muppet Glee Club.; Closing scene: Juliet receives a Muppet likeness of herself.
1.20 (20)	Kaye Ballard	23 January 1977	123
Backstage The orchestra gets fed up with playing the theme song every night and threaten to quit unless Kermit allows them to play their own music.; Song: "In the Summertime".; Guest Act: "Oh, Babe, What Would You Say?"; Muppet News Flash: Longest sentence.; At the Dance: Pig Latin.; UK Spot: Life.; Talk Spot: Theme Song.; Sketch: The Barber Shop.; Vendaface: Changing ugly women to pretty women.; Guest Act: "One Note Samba".; Closing Theme: only performed by Rowlf.
1.21 (21)	Bruce Forsyth	30 January 1977	113
Backstage: Fozzie thinks he can handle any heckler. Then Kermit cancels his act.; Song: The Snerfs dance to "In a Little Spanish Town".; Guest Act: "All I Need is the Girl".; At the Dance: "Mind if I light up?"; UK Spot: "I'm My Own Grandpa".; Talk Spot: Bruce rents a duck.; Wayne and Wanda: "Trees".; Guest Act: Bruce and Fozzie's comedy routine.; Veterinarian's Hospital: Duck!; Guest Act: "Let There Be Love".
1.22 (22)	Ethel Merman and Richard Bradshaw	5 February 1977	122
Backstage Fozzie's agent, Irving Bizarre, comes in to negotiate Fozzie's contract.; Sketch: "Java".; Guest Act: Medley of songs by Miss Merman.; Blackout: Merman tells Hilda about a mouse in her dressing room, and wonders whether she's on a show or in a zoo... then she meets Animal.; UK Spot: "Don't Sugar Me" sung by a mouse in a tea cup.; Talk Spot: Miss Merman teaches Miss Piggy to sing.; Guest Puppeteer: Australian Richard Bradshaw, with shadow puppets.; Song: Miss Merman sings "There's No Business Like Show Business".; Note: In the Nickelodeon airing, the first Statler and Waldorf comment and first backstage sequence were cut.
1.23 (23)	Connie Stevens and Sesame Street character duo Ernie and Bert	12 February 1977	102
Backstage: Fozzie believes everyone hates him when he hears Muppets insulting Gonzo's teddy bear.; Song: Kermit sings "Lydia the Tattooed Lady".; Swedish Chef: Meatballs.; Guest Act: "A Teenager in Love" by Connie Stevens and "The Mutations".; At the Dance: Classy Rats.; UK Spot: "Ain't Misbehavin'" by Electric Mayhem.; Guest Act: "(They Long to Be) Close to You" by Connie Stevens.; Song: "Sax and Violence" by Zoot and Mahna Mahna.; Gonzo's Act: Grow a tomato plant to the 1812 Overture.; Muppet News Flash: Hotline to Washington.; Guest Act: Bert sings "Some Enchanted Evening" while Connie Stevens dances in background.; Closing scene: Connie is presented with a Muppet likeness of herself. (This practice was discontinued after this episode.)
1.24 (24)	Vincent Price	19 February 1977	119
Backstage: A three-headed monster wants to be on the show.; Song: "I've Got You Under My Skin".; Guest Act: 'House of Horrors' sketch. (Edited in international airings, cut in 1994 VHS version); Wayne and Wanda: "Bewitched, Bothered and Bewildered". (Cut in Brazilian airing on MGM Gold, along with preceding backstage scene); Panel Discussion: "Gourmet Dining"; At the Dance: Haunted ballroom. (Cut in Nickelodeon airing); UK Spot: "I'm Looking Through You". (Cut in 1994 VHS version); Talk Spot: How to become a vampire.; Muppet News Flash: Furniture comes alive.; Blackout: Vincent cannot find Hilda for his dressing. Sweetums appears and offers to give him a hand.; Talking Houses: The hospital.; Guest Act: "You've Got a Friend". (Cut in 1994 VHS and Season One DVD versions)

=== Season 2 (1977–1978) ===
Several changes were made for the second season. Each week, Scooter would now greet the guest star in his or her dressing room before the opening theme song by announcing the time until curtain call. The opening theme sequence was replaced with the more familiar one, showing each cast member under an arch. Sketches such as "At the Dance", "Talk Spot", "Panel Discussions", "Talking Houses", and "Fozzie's Monologue" either made fewer appearances or were dropped altogether. Several characters were rebuilt, with noticeable changes in Miss Piggy, Fozzie Bear, Gonzo the Great, and Janice. Characters like George the Janitor, Hilda, Mildred, and Wayne and Wanda were dropped from the series (although Mildred would still make rare sporadic appearances). Robin is identified as Kermit's nephew. New sketches include "Pigs in Space" and "An Editorial by Sam the Eagle". New characters include Bunsen Honeydew's assistant Beaker, Link Hogthrob, Dr. Julius Strangepork, Doglion, and Annie Sue. Muppet performers Eren Ozker and John Lovelady departed from The Muppet Show after the first season. In early episodes of the second season, female puppeteers were auditioned to replace Ozker. Louise Gold was eventually hired as Ozker's replacement. Richard Hunt replaced Ozker as Janice's performer while Jerry Nelson took over the roles of Crazy Harry and The Announcer from John Lovelady. Jack Burns quit his role as writer after the first season.

No.	Guest star	Original release date	Prod. code
2.01 (25)	George Burns	16 September 1977	210
Backstage: The cast is plagued by a gossip columnist from The Daily Scandal.; Song: Piggy sings "Cuanto Le Gusta".; Guest Act: Rowlf accompanies George Burns as they discuss dog acts and sing "Train Back Home".; Song: "Chattanooga Choo Choo".; Veterinarian's Hospital: Dr. Bob treats a telephone.; UK Spot: Fozzie sings "Wotcher (Knocked 'Em in the Old Kent Road)".; Talk Spot: Gonzo chats with George Burns about Gonzo's early showbiz days.; Song: Kermit and Piggy sing "I Won't Dance" in a skit that begins like an "At the Dance" segment.; Sketch: A machine-eating monster.; Guest Act: George sings "It All Depends on You" and "You Made Me Love You" with the cast.
2.02 (26)	Rich Little	23 September 1977	204
Backstage: Gonzo interviews hopefuls for a new dancing chicken act.; Song: "Chanson D'Amour" with Crazy Harry and three Muppet ladies.; Guest Act: Impressions of the Muppet cast.; At the Dance: Just not Animal's night.; UK Spot: "The Boy in the Gallery" by Miss Piggy, accompanied by Rowlf (and audience).; Sketch: "The Glow-Worm" with lizard and inchworms.; Talk Spot Muppet reporters interview Rich Little.; Veterinarian's Hospital: Fozzie the Bear is a little hoarse.; Sketch: "Tea for Two" by Gonzo and his dancing chicken, Lolita.; Guest Act: Scenes from the great Hollywood musical comedies of yesterday.
2.03 (27)	Madeline Kahn	30 September 1977	209
Backstage: Gonzo has a crush on guest star Madeline Kahn.; Song: Kermit sings "Happy Feet" to answer the audience's question "Can the frog tap dance?"; Guest Act: "I'll Never Forget Your Feet".; Song: "Animal Sings Gershwin".; Swedish Chef: Lobster.; UK Spot: Dr. Teeth, Zoot, and Floyd do "New York State of Mind".; Pigs in Space: The Swinetrek loses power.; Song: Fozzie sings with his ukulele.; Guest Act: Madeline has a run-in with a monster in the park who is out to ruin her day.; News Flash: Reporters are blowing up.; Song: Rowlf does "Up, Up and Away".; Song: "Wishing Song" by Madeline and Gonzo.
2.04 (28)	Edgar Bergen	7 October 1977	207
Backstage: Fozzie decides to try a ventriloquist act.; Song: "Baby Face" performed by a chorus of chickens.; Talk Spot: Kermit chats backstage with Edgar Bergen and Charlie McCarthy about frogs and sings "Consider Yourself" (from Oliver!) with Fozzie Bear, Gonzo, Scooter, Uncle Deadly, Janice, Link Hogthrob, Dr. Julius Strangepork, Luncheon Counter Monster, the chickens, the pigs, and the Frackles.; Muppet News Flash: The Muppet Newsman forgets his pants.; Sketch: Gonzo wrestles a brick blindfolded.; Pigs in Space: Piggy has to save the day with the "independent heating slash unifying element and horizontal equalizing plane".; UK Spot: Rowlf sings "Show Me a Rose".; Talk Spot: Fozzie talks with Edgar Bergen and Mortimer Snerd about their act.; Fozzie's Act: Fozzie puts his ventriloquist skills to the test with his friend Chucky.; Song: "Time in a Bottle".; Song: Opening of (Down At) Papa Joe's is pecked out by chickens on a piano.; Guest Act: Edgar Bergen and Charlie McCarthy discuss the Muppets and are joined by Piggy.
2.05 (29)	Dom DeLuise	14 October 1977	211
Backstage: Miss Piggy collaborates with Scooter to make Kermit jealous and get a better place on the show.; Song: Piggy sings "My Old Man Said Follow the Van".; Guest Act: Dom DeLuise travels to the planet Koozbane and meets the natives.; Song: Animal has a drum solo.; Veterinarian's Hospital: Dr. Bob treats a cow.; UK Spot: "Henrietta's Wedding".; Song: Dr. Teeth and The Electric Mayhem performs "Don't Blame the Dynamite".; Guest Act: A tour of Shepard's Institute of Animal Protection.; Guest Act: Dom sings "We Got Us" with Piggy.
2.06 (30)	John Cleese	21 October 1977	223
Backstage: John Cleese is the special guest... whether he wants to be or not.; Song: "Somebody Stole My Gal".; Gonzo's Act: Gonzo catches a cannonball with his bare hand, stretching his arm.; Muppet News Flash: Solving the food crisis.; Song: Rowlf and a chicken play a song on the piano.; Pigs in Space: John Cleese invades the Swinetrek as an old-fashion pirate.; At the Dance: Waiter and fly soup jokes.; UK Spot: Piggy sings "Waiting at the Church".; Song: Robin and Sweetums sing "Two Lost Souls".; Talk Spot: John tries to help Gonzo with his misshapen arm.; Sketch: Kermit reports from the planet Koozbaine.; Guest Act: John refuses to do a song. The rest of the Muppets try to help.
2.07 (31)	Nancy Walker	28 October 1977	206
Backstage: Kermit is home sick, so Fozzie is in charge.; Song: Crazy Harry and a cannon.; Guest Act: Nancy at the diner with Fozzie and the Luncheon Counter Monster eats dishes.; Veterinarian's Hospital: Combined with At the Dance after Fozzie messes up the introduction.; UK Spot: "My Old Dutch" with Burlington Bertie and Rowlf.; Sketch: Bird medley.; Talk Spot: Fozzie talks to Nancy about the problems with the night's show and she sings "Pick Yourself Up" to Fozzie. Later, Piggy, and Nancy talk to Kermit on the phone.; Sam's Editorial: Sam discusses nudity in the world today.; Guest Act: "They Can't Take That Away from Me" with Sweetums.
2.08 (32)	Bernadette Peters	4 November 1977	212
Backstage: Kermit's nephew Robin feels unwanted and wants to run away. Miss Piggy harbours jealousy against Miss Mousey.; Song: Kermit and Miss Mousey sing "How Could You Believe Me?"; Guest Act: "Take a Little One Step, Two Step" by Bernadette Peters as Sweetums, Thog, and Timmy Monster follow along; Song: Chickens peck out "Chopsticks" on the piano.; Veterinarian's Hospital: Dr. Bob treats a shoe.; UK Spot: "The Sheik of Araby".; Sketch: Sam tells the story of the ant and the grasshopper.; Talk Spot: Robin chats with Bernadette who sings "Just One Person" with Kermit the Frog, Fozzie Bear, Scooter, Gonzo, Rowlf the Dog, Droop, and Green Frackle.; Swedish Chef: Chickie Boom.; Muppet Labs: Bunsonium.; Song: Robin sings "I'm Five" and part of "They Call the Wind Maria" before getting pulled away. (Cut from Disney+ showing); Muppet News Flash: A large object drops from the ceiling.; Guest Act: "Apple Jack" with the Jug Band.
2.09 (33)	Milton Berle	11 November 1977	203
Backstage: Fozzie hides from his idol, Milton Berle.; Song: "Ugly" by Mean Mama, the Frackles, a Crocodile, and a Warthog.; Guest Act: Statler and Waldorf successfully drive Milton Berle insane by heckling him, creating a hilarious monologue in the process.; Muppet News Flash: The battle over Mary Crandall's will between her son Charles and her cat Cuteypie.; Pigs in Space: An unidentified object is going to crash into the Swinetrek: Gonzo on a motorcycle.; Guest Act: Milton Berle sings "The Entertainer" with Rowlf accompanying on the piano. Chorus includes Scooter and Fozzie in the end.; UK Spot: "Who?" by Zelda Rose and her Singing Owl.; Guest Act: Milton Berle and Fozzie do a song and dance act: "Top Banana".
2.10 (34)	Teresa Brewer	2 December 1977	222
Backstage: Piggy decides to go on a diet.; Guest Act: "Cotton Fields".; Pigs in Space: The crew is running out of oxygen, fuel, water, and swill.; Song: Animal performs "Wild Thing".; Gonzo's Act: Gonzo recites Shakespeare in his own way.; At the Dance: The couples discuss losing weight.; UK Spot: Dr. Teeth performs a song about cheesecake.; Talk Spot: Kermit talks to Teresa about her autograph book.; Muppet Labs: Electric Nose Warmer.; Song: Scooter sings "At the Hop" with some friends.; Guest Act: "Spinning Wheel" with Sweetums.; Guest Act: "Music! Music! Music!".
2.11 (35)	Steve Martin	9 December 1977	208
Backstage: Kermit conducts auditions for the next show, but he forgets to tell Steve. Fozzie gets worried Kermit will hire a new comedian to replace him.; Sketch: Several acts audition, including Can-Canning Rodents and Mary Louise (Whatnot version) and Friend (a frog) singing "Swannee Ribbit" until Mary-Louise is hooked off the stage.; Guest Act: Balloon Animals.; Sketch: More acts audition including Terry-Louise (an alias of Mary Louise) and Friend singing "Tie a Yellow Ribbit" until Terry-Louise is hooked off the stage, Baskerville the Hound doing stand-up, and another emcee auditions.; Song: The Four Fazoobs from the planet Koozbane.; UK Spot: Gonzo and his dancing cheese; Sketch: Carrie-Louise (another alias of Mary Louise) and Friend singing "Ol' Man Ribbit" (it is revealed that during this time that Miss Piggy had repeatedly hooked Mary Louise off the stage because she doesn't want Mary Louise to replace her as the show's resident "girl singer").; Guest Act: "Ramblin' Guy".; Song: Statler and Waldorf perform "The Varsity Drag", with Fozzie copying them from the balcony.; Song: Marvin Suggs and His All Food Glee Club, "Yes! We Have No Bananas".; Guest Act: Juggling.; Sketch: The Flying Zucchini Brothers human cannonball act auditions.; Guest Act: Steve plays "Dueling Banjos" with the Jug Band, the All Food Glee Club, the Fazoobs, and the Flying Zucchini Brothers.; Note: Brian Henson has said that the laughter in this episode is actually the laughter of the Muppet performers as the show was being recorded.
2.12 (36)	Lou Rawls	16 December 1977	215
Backstage: The show is thrown into chaos when Fozzie's roller skating act isn't quite ready.; Guest Act: "Groovy People".; News Flash: Mallarditus.; Veterinarian's Hospital: Dr. Bob has no patient.; Guest Act: Floyd and Animal chat with Lou.; Swedish Chef: Frog's legs.; At the Dance: Lots of visual gags.; UK Spot: Kermit sings "Ukulele Lady" (with Miss Piggy and Scooter).; Song: Link sings "Sonny Boy" with a piglet.; Talk Spot: Kermit chats with Lou, which turns into a scat song with the Electric Mayhem.; Muppet Labs: Nuclear Powered Shaver.; Fozzie's Act: Fozzie on roller skates.; Guest Act: "You're the One".
2.13 (37)	Julie Andrews	25 December 1977	217
Backstage: A real cow mysteriously appears backstage.; Guest Act: "The Lonely Goatherd".; News Flash: Sports equipment jettisoned, including 10,000 ping pong balls and 1 bowling ball.; Gonzo's Act: Gonzo plays the bagpipes from a flagpole 10 feet in the air, but the act is cut short when a beaver gnaws the flagpole, prompting it to fall down.; Song: Rowlf plays Beethoven's "Moonlight Sonata".; Talk Spot: Kermit attempts a quiet chat with Julie Andrews.; Song: Gonzo sings "Won't Somebody Dance with Me".; UK Spot: "Borneo" by the Jugband.; Guest Act: "When You Were a Tadpole and I Was a Fish" with Kermit.; Sam's Commentary: Industry and Technology.; Muppet Labs: Hair Growing Tonic.; Guest Act: "I Whistle a Happy Tune".
2.14 (38)	Peter Sellers	1 January 1978	219
Backstage: Bunsen and Beaker keep appearing and disappearing, as well as other cast members and items.; Guest Act: "A Gypsy's Violin".; Song: Rowlf sings "When", a song about nature sounds.; Talk Spot: Kermit tells Peter Sellers to be himself; Peter Sellers replies he cannot because "there is no me" and "I had it surgically removed".; UK Spot: Gonzo sings "Down Memory Lane" with Rowlf.; Guest Act: Peter Sellers assists Link with his workout.; Song: Kermit sings "Bein' Green".; Muppet Labs: Teleporter.; Guest Act: "Cigarettes, and Whiskey, and Wild, Wild Women".
2.15 (39)	Elton John	8 January 1978	214
Backstage: Scooter has a song for Elton John. The Swedish Chef chases a chicken. Sam thinks Elton John is an affront to culture.; Guest Act: "Crocodile Rock" with a group of crocodiles.; Swedish Chef: Egg du Chef.; Guest Act: Scooter starts singing "Bennie and the Jets" and Elton takes over.; Veterinarian's Hospital: Dr. Bob treats a dog.; UK Spot #1: Fozzie joins Rowlf for a piano duet on "An English Country Garden".; UK Spot #2: Kermit and Fozzie sing "Any Old Iron".; Guest Act: "Goodbye Yellow Brick Road" with the Electric Mayhem.; Pigs in Space: Boredom.; Guest Act: "Don't Go Breaking My Heart" with Miss Piggy.; Note: Debut of Afghan Hound and Annie Sue.
2.16 (40)	Cleo Laine and Bruce Schwartz	15 January 1978	216
Backstage: Fozzie's mother is in the audience.; Song: "Everybody Limbo".; Guest Act: "It Don't Mean a Thing (If It Ain't Got That Swing)" with Dr. Teeth and the Electric Mayhem Orchestra.; Pigs in Space: Annual Inspection, with Fozzie filling in for Piggy.; Extra Guest Act: Bruce Schwartz performs with a marionette.; UK Spot: Rowlf and a few dogs perform "Mad Dogs and Englishmen".; Swedish Chef: Cleo Laine assists, singing "You're Just in Love" with the Chef.; Fozzie's Act: Phrenology.; Guest Act: Cleo Lane performs "If" with Bruce Schwartz.
2.17 (41)	Rudolf Nureyev	22 January 1978	213
Backstage: Sam attempts to class up the cast due to their high culture guest star.; Song: Dr. Teeth and the Electric Mayhem perform Boccherini's "String Quintet in E major, Op. 11, No. 5 (Boccherini)" (which Sgt. Floyd Pepper calls "Minuet in G Major").; Song: Piggy and Link sing a duet from Don Giovanni.; Guest Act: Swine Lake.; UK Spot: "Something's Missing".; Veterinarian's Hospital: A Tribute to Shakespeare.; Guest Act: Duet in a steam bath with Piggy, "Baby, It's Cold Outside".; Song: Rowlf plays Debussy's "Clair de Lune" with some help from Fozzie.; Guest Act: "Top Hat, White Tie and Tails".
2.18 (42)	Judy Collins	29 January 1978	205
Backstage: J.P. Gross wants to demolish the theatre and put in a junkyard.; Guest Act: "Leatherwing Bat".; Pigs in Space: Mid-course correction manoeuvre.; Sam's Editorial: Sam announces he's disassociating himself with the show.; Guest Act: "I Know an Old Lady Who Swallowed a Fly".; Muppet News Flash: The Newsman's report catches on fire.; UK Spot: "I Talk to the Trees", with Link Hogthrob.; Sketch: Kermit reports from planet Koozebane to interview the Foob.; Guest Act: Duet on piano with Rowlf, "Do-Re-Mi".; Swedish Chef: Shotgun.; Guest Act: "Send in the Clowns".
2.19 (43)	Don Knotts	5 February 1978	201
Backstage: The band is so pleased with the song Fozzie picks for them that they declare him hip and give him a pair of shades.; Song: "Sweet Gingerbread Man" by the Gingerbread Men.; Song: "The Windmills of Your Mind".; Guest Act: 'Beast of the Week' sketch.; Veterinarian's Hospital: Patient with three feet.; UK Spot: "Burlington Bertie from Bow".; Talk Spot: Fozzie and Don enjoy being hip.; Song: "What a Wonderful World" by Rowlf.; Swedish Chef: Fish Stew.; Guest Act: "Lullaby of Birdland". (Cut from Disney+ showing)
2.20 (44)	Cloris Leachman	12 February 1978	224
Backstage: Pigs take over the show. Kermit and other regulars are kept in the boiler room.; Song: "That's Entertainment!".; Guest Act: Cloris sings a medley with Link.; Fozzie's Act: Fozzie the Pig performs, meeting with better success than Fozzie the Bear.; Swedish Chef: The Swedish Pig makes popcorn.; UK Spot/Veterinarian's Hospital: Rebranded "Vegetarian's Hospital", the all-pig cast is presented with a tray of fruits and vegetables as a patient.; News Flash: Presented by a pig newscaster who comments that Dr. Bunsen Honeypig has created a silk purse out of a sow's ear.; Pigs in Space: The Swinetrek is under attack by chopped liver.; Guest Act: "Just in Time".
2.21 (45)	Bob Hope	19 February 1978	221
Backstage: Bob Hope is splitting his time between The Muppet Show and several charity shows. Animal tries to find a hobby.; Song: "Pig Calypso" featuring Piggy and various other pigs.; Guest Act: Bob and Kermit do a quick back and forth, Bob has skipped out on a benefit for the Flying Zucchini Brothers to be at the show.; Song: "For What It's Worth" sung by Woodland Creatures, interrupted by inept Whatnot Hunters, George the Janitor, and Gramps.; News Flash: Opening day of fishing season.; The Swedish Chef: Pressed duck.; News Flash: Opening of opera season.; Song: Rowlf performs a short piano solo ("Pathétique").; UK Spot: "Sing Me the Songs" by J.P. Grosse and some primary Muppets.; Muppet Labs: Automatic Waste Basket.; Song: Rowlf gets another chance at a piano solo ("Nola"), with an extra hand.; Guest Act: Cowboy Sketch, "Don't Fence Me In" sung by Bob and his horse.
2.22 (46)	Jaye P. Morgan	26 February 1978	218
Backstage: Morgan is not very thrilled about being on the show. Later, Scooter's uncle J.P. Gross shows up.; Guest Act: "Tweedlee Dee".; Swedish Chef: Opening a coconut.; Song: Rowlf, Gonzo, and Animal perform "Flight of the Bumblebee".; At the Dance: Men vs. Women, and the troubles with some of the couples.; Talk Spot: Kermit and Jaye P. talk about explosions.; UK Spot: Floyd and Nigel the conductor perform "Big Noise from Winnetka".; Pigs in Space: The Swinetrek plummets towards Earth at an incredible speed, needing to toss some excess weight overboard to slow down.; News Flash: The London Symphony Orchestra jettisons some instruments from their flight.; Sam's Commentary: Crime.; Guest Act: "That Old Black Magic" with the Electric Mayhem.
2.23 (47)	Zero Mostel	5 March 1978	202
Backstage: Scooter's uncle J.P. Gross will give the show the money they need in exchange for adding a lady wrestler number.; Song: Chopin's "Polonaise in A Flat" by Electric Mayhem.; Guest Act: "What do the Simple Folk Do?"; At the Dance: Tennis.; Muppet Labs: Magnetic Carrots.; UK Spot: Piano-sax duet, "Smoke Gets in Your Eyes".; Guest Act: 'Fears' poem.; Song: Drum Solo.; Sketch: Lady Wrestling.; Note: Zero Mostel died before this episode was broadcast, the only guest to have this distinction. Debut of Beaker.
2.24 (48)	Petula Clark	12 March 1978	220
Backstage: A moose named Mickey, who sounds like John Wayne, hangs out backstage, upsetting Kermit.; Song: "Sea Chantey" with Link, Scooter, Fozzie, Gonzo, and Robin.; Guest Act: "The Boy from Ipanema".; Sketch: A Wild West bar filled with chickens, and Gonzo as the bartender, turns into a shootout after a villain enters.; At the Dance: The couples discuss their relationships and mothers.; UK Spot: "Upidee".; Guest Act: "Too Shy to Say" with Rowlf.; Veterinarian's Hospital: Dr. Bob, Nurse Piggy, and Nurse Janice operate on a sinking patient.; The Swedish Chef: Chocolate Moose.; Guest Act: "Tomorrow".

=== Season 3 (1978–1979) ===
The third season began promptly after the second season in the Spring of 1978, then took a summer and autumn break when Jim Henson went to work on production of The Muppet Movie, resuming in November 1978. All of the characters and sketches from the previous season remained. New characters included dimwitted stagehand Beauregard, boomerang fish thrower Lew Zealand, cafeteria lady Gladys, Bobby Benson and His Baby Band, and sports commentator Louis Kazagger. New segments included "Muppet Sports" and "Bear on Patrol". Two new puppeteers, Steve Whitmire and Kathryn Mullen, joined the troupe of Muppeteers during this season.

No.	Guest star	Original release date	Prod. code
3.01 (49)	Roy Clark	19 March 1978	303
Backstage: Fozzie Bear misunderstands a conversation between Kermit and Roy Clark and sends all the stagehands out to the country.; Guest Act: "Rocky Top", with Lubbock Lou and his Jug Huggers.; Swedish Chef: Dough.; Pigs in Space: Electric toaster. Featuring Gonzo, a chicken, Beaker, the Male Koozebanian Creature, Luncheon Counter Monster, the Witch Doctor, Chopped Liver, and Statler.; Guest Act: "Yesterday, When I Was Young".; UK Spot: "I Don't Want to Set the World on Fire".; Talk Spot: Roy mistakenly insults some animals.; At the Dance: Barn dance jokes.; Gonzo's Act: Yodeling Nikolai Rimsky-Korsakov while riding a motorised pogo-stick.; Guest Act: "Sally Was a Good Old Girl".
3.02 (50)	Leo Sayer	26 March 1978	302
Backstage: Kermit lets Annie Sue, another female pig singer, perform on the show, thus making Miss Piggy extremely jealous.; Guest Act: "You Make Me Feel Like Dancing" by Leo Sayer backed by the Electric Mayhem.; Song: "You Put a Piece of Carbon Paper Under Your Heart" by Annie Sue.; Song: "The Daffodils" by a sneezing Miss Piggy accompanied by a sneezing Rowlf.; Guest Act: "The Show Must Go On" by Leo Sayer backed by Animal on Drums and a banjo.; UK Spot: "She Was One of the Early Birds" by Gonzo.; Talk Spot: Dr. Teeth introduces Animal to Leo.; Fozzie's Act: Fozzie, accompanied by Annie Sue, attempts to perform a memory stunt, but keeps forgetting Annie's name.; Guest Act: "When I Need You" by Leo Sayer featuring Billy the Bear, Mickey Moose, Harold Woodpecker, a beaver, a weasel, Crazy Harry, and Mayor Harrison Fox and James Badger from Emmet Otter's Jug-Band Christmas.
3.03 (51)	Gilda Radner	2 April 1978	304
Backstage: Guest star Gilda Radner faces several problems.; Song: Eskimo pigs sing "Lullaby of Broadway".; Guest Act: Gilda and a seven-foot-tall talking carrot (instead of a seven-foot-tall parrot as she requested, due to a misunderstanding of her handwriting) sing a medley of songs from "The Pirates of Penzance".; Muppet Melodrama: Uncle Deadly and Wayne are too busy dancing to pay attention to Miss Piggy. (Scene after this sketch cut in Nickelodeon airing); Song: Marvin Suggs and his Muppaphones perform "Witch Doctor".; UK Spot: "The Bird on Nellie's Hat".; Muppet Labs: Muppet Labs' Super Adhesive.; Song: Rowlf and Zoot play "Body and Soul".; Muppet News Flash: The rogue adhesive is under control. (Scene of Floyd telling Kermit that Gonzo's eyes are stuck to a TV screen cut in Nickelodeon airing); Guest Act: "Tap Your Troubles Away".
3.04 (52)	Pearl Bailey	9 April 1978	305
Backstage: Floyd is unhappy with the closing number.; Guest Act: "My Soul Is a Witness".; Muppet Labs: Edible paperclips. (Cut in Nickelodeon airing); Act: Two chickens play the chimes.; Muppet News Flash: An explosion at the Smithfield Hat Factory.; Talk Spot/Guest Act: Pearl and Floyd chat, and then sing "In the Good Old Summer Time".; UK Spot: "Hi-Diddle-Dee-Dee", with Fozzie and Rowlf.; Pigs in Space: Snacko Waves.; At the Dance: Floyd and the Black Knight (Gonzo) are too light on their feet. (Last few seconds cut from Disney+ showing); Guest Act: The jousting scene from Camelot. Songs sung are "Ascot Gavotte", "Hello, Dolly!", "Fugue for Tinhorns", "Anything You Can Do", "A Boy Like That", and "Everything's Coming up Roses".
3.05 (53)	Jean Stapleton	16 April 1978	306
Backstage: Kermit puts up with various problems in the theatre.; Song: "Tico Tico", by Annie Sue and some pigs.; Guest Act: "Play a Simple Melody", with Fozzie.; At the Dance: 'I see you don't have much to say'.; Song: "Daddy Wouldn't Buy Me a Bow Wow", with Annie Sue and Rowlf.; Talk Spot: Jean reveals to Sam the Eagle that the Swedish Chef doesn't speak real Swedish.; Muppet Melodrama: Miss Piggy gets tied to a railroad track.; Muppet Labs: Shrinking pills.; Guest Act: "I'm Just Wild About Harry", with Crazy Harry.
3.06 (54)	Loretta Lynn	23 April 1978	308
Backstage: The Muppet Theater is being fumigated, so the entire show moves to a railroad station – and is constantly interrupted by passing trains.; Guest Act: "You're Lookin' at Country, with Lubbock Lou and his Jughuggers.; Song: Miss Piggy sings "All Alone".; Muppet News Flash: Strike against mail carriers.; Fozzie's Act: The electricians and the polar bear.; At the Dance: Hobos.; UK Spot: Kermit and Gonzo sing "Sentimental Journey".; Guest Act: "Oh Lonesome Me", with Rowlf, Baskerville, and other dogs.; Veterinarian's Hospital: Train conductor.; Muppet News Flash: Chickens pecking in morse key.; Song: "The Rhyming Song" (an original song by Frank Oz and Larry Grossman), with Fozzie, Scooter, Annie Sue, and Link.; Guest Act: "One's on the Way"; (Note: Even though it was produced for season three, this episode aired as the last episode of season two in the UK. New Statler and Waldorf bits were made to mention this.)
3.07 (55)	Raquel Welch	17 November 1978	311
Backstage: Fozzie goes to group therapy to become more assertive.; Guest Act: "Baby It's Me".; Song: Gonzo sings "Jamboree" (an original song by Larry Grossman and Frank Oz).; At the Dance: Fozzie tries to do his act, but the dancers keep telling the punchlines to his jokes.; UK Spot: Kermit chats with Marvin Suggs and his Muppaphones.; Talk Spot/Guest Act: Raquel serenades Fozzie with a rendition of "Confide in Me".; Swedish Chef: Chicken-in-a-basket.; Talk Spot: Miss Piggy visits Raquel in her dressing room.; Guest Act: Raquel and Miss Piggy sing "I'm a Woman".
3.08 (56)	Alice Cooper	24 November 1978	307
Backstage: The "talented but frightening" Alice Cooper sets an eerie mood for the show.; Guest Act: "Welcome to My Nightmare".; Muppet Labs: Germ Enlarger.; Act: Stalagmite's toothache.; Talk Spot: Sam gives Alice his opinion on him.; Canteen: Fozzie and some clean-cut kids. (Line segueing to it cut in 1994 VHS Version); Song: Robin sings "Over the Rainbow". (Cut in 1994 VHS Version); UK Spot: "Once a Year Day".; Guest Act: "You and Me".; Pigs in Space: The crew turns into outlines of themselves.; Guest Act: "School's Out". (Fade between "School's Out" and the goodnights cut in 1994 VHS Version)
3.09 (57)	Helen Reddy	1 December 1978	313
Backstage: Kermit tells his new janitor, Beauregard, to clean up the theatre.; Song: "Stayin' Alive" by Miss Piggy (as Marie Antoinette and the pigs).; Guest Act: "Blue".; Talk Spot: Animal and the Swedish Chef sing their version of "Happy Birthday to You" and "Jingle Bells".; Dance Number: Fozzie and some Whatnots.; Muppet News Flash: Over-hand refrigerator tossing.; UK Act: Rowlf plays "Pathétique".; Guest Act: "You and Me Against the World".; Veterinarian's Hospital: Sound booth operator.; Song: "Tie Me Kangaroo Down, Sport".; Guest Act: "We'll Sing in the Sunshine".
3.10 (58)	James Coco	8 December 1978	312
Backstage: James Coco talks Kermit into adding some "razzle-dazzle" to the show.; Song: "Octopus's Garden", with Robin, Kermit, Piggy, and Animal.; Guest Act: James plays a medium, and Fozzie his customer. The two are visited by a ghost, who sings "Danny Boy".; Rowlf's Act: "Eight Little Notes".; UK Spot: Robin is afraid of snakes, but Kermit has him imagine the beauty of snakes. Robin envisions a quartet of snakes dancing to "In a Persian Market".; Swedish Chef: Banana split, interrupted by dancers.; Song: Wayne sings "Catch a Falling Star".; Veterinarian's Hospital: Interrupted by dancers.; Guest Act: "Short People".
3.11 (59)	Marisa Berenson	15 December 1978	310
Backstage: Kermit is pestered by Lew Zealand, who wants to audition his boomerang fish act. Miss Piggy concocts a scheme to trick Kermit into marrying her.; Song: Russian pigs perform "Red Pigs Dance".; Guest Act: Marisa dances with Feather Boas.; Muppet Sports: Wig racing.; UK Spot: Robin sings "Someone to Watch Over Me".; Song: Kermit, Annie Sue, Scooter, a salamander, Robin, Beauregard, and Fozzie sing "Do-Re-Mi".; Guest Act: "You're Always Welcome at Our House".; Canteen: The Swedish Chef makes a wedding cake.; Sketch: Lew Zealand 'rescues' Kermit from Miss Piggy's wedding plot.
3.12 (60)	Kris Kristofferson & Rita Coolidge	22 December 1978	301
Guest Act: "Help Me Make It Through the Night" by Kris Kristofferson and Miss Piggy backed by Electric Mayhem; Canteen: Gonzo prepares for his act.; Gonzo Act: Gonzo recites the seven-times tables while standing on a hammock and balancing a piano.; Muppet Labs: Atomic Elevator Shoes.; Song: "My Wild Irish Rose" by Wayne.; Canteen: Miss Piggy and Annie Sue order.; Muppet News Flash: The Henderson burglary.; Guest Act: "We're All Alone" by Rita Coolidge featuring appearances by Billy the Bear, a Deer, a Beaver, a Weasel, and repurposed versions of Mayor Harrison Fox, James Badger, Nat Muskrat, and Will Possum from Emmet Otter's Jug-Band Christmas.; UK Spot: Rowlf sings "A Frog He Would A-Wooing Go", and Sam comments.; Talk Spot: Gonzo offers his autograph to Kris and Rita.; Song: "New York State of Mind" by Floyd Pepper, Dr. Teeth, and Zoot.; Song: Chickens play the chimes.; Canteen: Animal's TV dinner.; Song: "Hi-Diddle-Dee-Dee" by Rowlf and Fozzie.; Guest Act: "Song I Like to Sing" by Kris Kristofferson and Rita Coolidge.
3.13 (61)	Danny Kaye	25 December 1978	316
Backstage: Statler and Waldorf leave their box to sit out in the alley, disgusted by the night's guest star.; Song: Whatnots sing "Aquarius".; Sketch: A construction worker breaks for lunch. (Cut in Nickelodeon Airing); Canteen/Talk Spot: Danny accidentally makes rude remarks towards Miss Piggy.; Guest Act: Danny and Piggy perform "Cheek to Cheek".; UK Spot: "Jogging". (Cut from Disney+ showing); Swedish Chef: The Chef and his uncle (Danny) prepare a Swiss Turkey.; The Flying Zucchini Brothers: Beauregard takes back his bucket of water.; Talk Spot: Kermit asks Danny to do one more song.; Song: Clyde Cahuenga performs the "Municipal Vermin Abatement Code", as set to Mozart.; Guest Act: Danny and the Muppets sing "Inchworm".
3.14 (62)	Cheryl Ladd	29 December 1978	324
Backstage: Kermit chats with the Bust of Beethoven. Fozzie reads a book on self-improvement and asks Kermit to make a list of his good points and bad points.; Song: Piggy and Link sing "True Love".; Guest Act: "South Rampart Street Parade", with Timmy Monster and the Clodhoppers.; Pigs in Space: Invisibly pills.; UK Spot: Scooter sings "There's a New Sound". (Cut from Disney+ showing); Talk Spot/Guest Act: Miss Piggy and Cheryl practice karate together while singing "I Enjoy Being a Girl".; Gonzo's Act: Gonzo hypnotizes himself into holding up a 5000-pound weight with one arm.; Guest Act: "Sunshine on My Shoulders".
3.15 (63)	Harry Belafonte	5 January 1979	314
Backstage: Despite Kermit's insistence that everything on the show is spontaneous, Fozzie Bear decides it needs scripts.; Guest Act: Harry sings "Day-O (The Banana Boat Song)", but Fozzie keeps interrupting by trying to improve the number.; Song: Rowlf and Lew perform "Tea for Two" backwards.; Pigs in Space: The Dissolvatron. Janice, Kermit, and the Swedish Chef also appear.; UK Spot: Floyd and Zoot perform "Honeysuckle Rose".; Guest Act: Harry and Animal perform a drum battle.; Muppet Sports: Blindfold sprint. (Cut in Nickelodeon airing); Talk Spot: Fozzie visits Harry for advice.; Guest Act: Harry and some African masks sing "Turn the World Around".
3.16 (64)	Lesley Ann Warren	12 January 1979	315
Backstage: Gonzo unveils his new act: riding his motorcycle up a ramp and into Statler and Waldorf's theatre box.; Gonzo's Act: Gonzo tries to ride a motorcycle up a ramp.; Guest Act: Lesley and Doglion perform "Beastly and the Beaut", a ballet version of Beauty and the Beast.; Pigs in Space: Dummo Rays.; UK Spot: Dr. Teeth performs "Mack the Knife", but Sam doesn't find it wholesome.; Guest Act: Lesley is supposed to perform with Rowlf, but Marvin Suggs and his Muppaphones arrive in his place. They play "The Blue Danube", before Rowlf kicks them offstage. Rowlf and Lesley then perform "Just the Way You Are".; Gonzo's Act: Gonzo tries his motorcycle stunt a second time.; Guest Act: Lesley sings "Last Dance" to Link.
3.17 (65)	Liberace	19 January 1979	309
Backstage: Liberace decides to perform an entire "concert for birds" in the second half of the show, while Gonzo is determined to get his tap-dancing chickens into the act.; Song: "Never on Sunday", by Miss Piggy. (Part of scene after this song, prior to Fletcher Bird's introduction, cut in Nickelodeon airing); Canteen: Floyd asks Gladys for a fried egg.; Swedish Chef: Coffee. Interrupted by Veterinarian's Hospital.; Muppet News Flash: Remodeling of the Muppet newsroom.; UK Spot: "I Want to Sing in Opera", by Miss Piggy.; Guest Act: Liberace concert, featuring "Chopsticks", "Misty", Chopin's "Nocturne No. 5", and "Has Anybody Seen My Bird?"
3.18 (66)	Leslie Uggams with Big Bird	26 January 1979	318
Backstage: Leslie co-stars with Big Bird of Sesame Street.; Guest Act: Leslie and the monsters perform "Hey There, Good Times".; Muppet Labs: Fireproof paper. (Cut in Nickelodeon airing); Talk Spot/Guest Act: Lew Zealand talks to Leslie about his act. She sings "Here You Come Again".; UK Spot: Miss Piggy sings "Mad About the Frog", accompanied by Rowlf.; Bear on Patrol: Pig who does impressions.; Vendawish: A man wishes to be taller.; Song: Gonzo sings "Gonzo's Song" (an original song by Jerry Juhl, Chris Langham, and Derek Scott) to Camilla. Big Bird interrupts.; Guest Act: Leslie and Big Bird sing "Love Will Keep Us Together".
3.19 (67)	Elke Sommer	2 February 1979	319
Backstage: Beauregard lets Beaker help build a set for the ancient-Egypt closing number.; Song: Bobby Benson and his Baby Band perform "Pennsylvania 6-5000".; Guest Act: "Animal Crackers in My Soup".; Pigs in Space: First pigs on Koozebane.; UK Spot: Bobby Benson and his Baby Band perform "Tuxedo Junction".; Pigs in Space: Part two.; Talk Spot: Gonzo tells Elke the truth about Miss Piggy's fluency in speaking French.; Muppet Sports: Goldfish shooting.; Guest Act: Elke (as Cleopatra) sings "Row, Row, Row".
3.20 (68)	Sylvester Stallone	9 February 1979	320
Backstage: The backstage is invaded by Sylvester Stallone's groupies, who have paid Scooter for backstage passes.; Song: Pigs and penguins perform "Hawaiian War Chant".; Guest Act: Sylvester fights a lion who sings "Let's Call the Whole Thing Off".; Talk Spot: Sylvester discovers a talking punching bag in his dressing room.; Sketch: Professor Albert Flan presents Otto the Automatic Entertainer.; UK Spot: Floyd, Dr. Teeth, and Zoot perform "Lady Be Good".; Talk Spot: Link chats with Sylvester.; Song: Beauregard assists the band with a performance of the "William Tell Overture".; Veterinarian's Hospital: Hawaiian pig.; Fozzie's Act: Magician's act with Otto.; Guest Act: Sly and the Muppets sing "A Bird in a Gilded Cage".
3.21 (69)	Roger Miller	16 February 1979	321
Backstage: There's an outbreak of "cluckitis" in the theatre, a disease which causes the sufferer to sneeze and turn into a chicken.; Song: Pilgrim penguins sing "Alabamy Bound".; Guest Act: Roger performs "In the Summertime".; Bear on Patrol: Fozzie arrests a violent pig.; Guest Act: "Hat".; UK Spot: "Down at the Old Bull and Bush". (Cut from Disney+ showing); Talk Spot: Kermit tries to convince Roger that the show is going smoothly.; Rowlf's Act: Rowlf plays "Pop Goes the Weasel".; Veterinarian's Hospital: The cast make chicken jokes.; Guest Act: Roger Miller sings a medley of his songs.
3.22 (70)	Roy Rogers & Dale Evans	23 February 1979	322
Backstage: In honour of Roy and Dale, the theme of the show is cowboys, and Roy's cows mill around backstage.; Song: Prairie dogs sing "Blue Skies".; Guest Act: Roy sings "Skyball Paint".; Muppet Sports: Horseshoe pitching.; Guest Act: Dale sings "Deep in the Heart of Texas".; UK Spot: Jim and Jerry sings "A Four-Legged Friend".; Bear on Patrol: Bullets Barker.; Talk Spot: Roy and Kermit sing "Frog Went A-Courting". Roy teaches Kermit how to yodel.; Sketch: Slim Wilson tries to ride Old Skyball Paint.; Guest Act: Roy and Dale sing a medley of songs.
3.23 (71)	Spike Milligan	2 March 1979	317
Backstage: The Muppet Show is broadcast in 108 countries, so Kermit plans an "international extravaganza", featuring people from each of those nations.; Song: A Japan-themed number, interrupted by Fozzie singing "Oklahoma!".; Guest Act: Sam and Spike talk about American/British relations.; Song: A Scottish bagpiper wants to play "The Bonnie Glasgow Samba" on the bongos. He is forced to play something else ("Brazil") on the bagpipes.; Muppet News Flash: Mad English comic.; UK Spot: Wayne sings "Dog Walk".; Song: The Electric Mayhem perform "America", but it is interrupted by various international Muppet guests (and the Swedish Chef).; Guest Act: "The Intergalactic Brotherhood of Man, Including Things", with Lew Zealand.; Guest Act: Various international Muppets sing "It's a Small World", while Spike interrupts.
3.24 (72)	Lynn Redgrave	9 March 1979	323
Backstage: Kermit stars in the Muppet production of Robin Hood, with Lynn as Maid Marian and Fozzie as Little John.; Song: Scooter plays Alan-a-Dale.; Guest Act: Lynn and the gang sing "Hey Down".; Gonzo's Act: The Sheriff of Nottingham (Gonzo), having kidnapped Marian, demonstrates his torture devices on himself.; Muppet Sports: Archery contest.; Guest Act: Robin and Marian sing "I Still Love You".; Muppet News Flash: The Town Crier.; Guest Act: Lynn and the gang reprise "Hey Down".

=== Season 4 (1979–1980) ===
Most of the characters and sketches from the previous season remained. Canteen worker Gladys however, was replaced by a new character, Winny. Rizzo the Rat also made his earliest appearances, first as "Super Rat" in the episode which featured Christopher Reeve as its guest star.

No.	Guest star	Original release date	Prod. code
4.01 (73)	Dudley Moore	24 October 1979	407
Backstage: Dudley Moore's musical robot "M.A.M.M.A". causes mayhem and resentment among the cast.; Song: A group of bugs sings "She Loves You".; At the Dance: Everybody tries some disco, and Fozzie tries to tell some jokes.; Guest Act: "Mama Don't Allow"; Pigs in Space: The crew is plagued with musical cues.; UK Spot: Kermit and Piggy are in her dressing room, with some musical confusion.; Talk Spot: Floyd and Animal confront Dudley Moore.; Gonzo's Act: Reciting poetry by Percy Shelley while defusing a bomb, interrupted by the robot.; Guest Act: "How High the Moon".
4.02 (74)	Crystal Gayle	2 November 1979	402
Backstage: Scooter's Prairie Dog Glee Club run amok backstage, stealing anything that isn't nailed down.; Song: Various animals perform a German-flavored "Swanee".; Guest Act: "River Road".; Pigs in Space: Dearth Nadir (Gonzo) pays a visit, accompanied by his chicken stormtroopers.; UK Spot: Rowlf plays "Hold Tight, Hold Tight (Want Some Seafood Mama)" with Lew Zealand and assorted marine life.; Song: "Sixty Seconds Got Together" by a fishy barbershop quartet.; Song: "The Best Things in Life Are Free" by the Prairie Dog Glee Club.; Muppet Labs: Banana sharpener.; Guest Act: A haunting rendition of "We Must Believe in Magic".
4.03 (75)	Victor Borge	9 November 1979	405
Backstage: Bobby Benson is arrested, and Miss Piggy tries to babysit his Baby Band.; Song: Pigs (led by Link) and chickens (led by Gonzo) sing "Macho Man" as rival gangs.; Guest Act: Rowlf helps Victor perform "Hungarian Rhapsody No. 2".; Song: The Rats sing "Rock Around the Clock".; Guest Act: Victor attempts to play "The Blue Danube", but something's not quite right.; Song: Gonzo's reflection joins him in a duet of "Act Naturally".; Guest Act: Victor puts Fozzie and himself to sleep playing "The Moonlight Sonata".; Swedish Chef: The chef tries to make turtle soup.; Guest Act: The Baby Band backs Borge butchering Tchaikovsky's "Piano Concerto No. 1".
4.04 (76)	Beverly Sills	16 November 1979	409
Backstage: The cast looks forward to Beverly's classy contributions to their show, especially Miss Piggy.; Act: At Kermit's unwitting invitation, Statler and Waldorf give the audience a taste of old-style vaudeville with a burlesque performance of "Take Ten Terrific Girls" and a smattering of jokes.; Guest Act: Due to a misunderstanding, Beverly attempts to sing "When the Bloom is on the Sage" in an operatic style. At first she is upset, but then welcomes the change of pace, finishing with a little tap dance.; Muppet News Flash: The cows come home.; UK Spot: The Fuzz Brothers perform some light opera, or just something like opera.; Muppet University: Sam the Eagle attempts to explore the microscopic world of protozoa. (Cut in Nickelodeon airing); Guest Act: Beverly and the cast perform a short opera "Pigoletto", which turns out to be a pastiche of other works, such as La Traviata, Aida, Die Walküre, and even a little Rigoletto.; Note: For his work in this episode, art director Malcolm Stone received the first of two Emmy Award nominations for his work on The Muppet Show.
4.05 (77)	Shields and Yarnell	23 November 1979	403
Backstage: The mime guests alternately confuse and inspire the cast, especially Fozzie.; Song: Bouncing birds-on-a-wire sing "Take a Chance on Me".; Guest Act: Robot couple the Clinkers eats breakfast.; UK Spot: Quongo the gorilla climbs a skyscraper and sings "It's Lonely at the Top".; Guest Act: Beauregard tends bar for the mimes in a Wild West saloon.; Song: The Snerfs perform "Little Brown Jug".; Fozzie's Act: The audience is underwhelmed by Fozzie's new mime act.; Guest Act: The mimes do their thing as the cast performs "Make 'Em Laugh".
4.06 (78)	Kenny Rogers	30 November 1979	410
Backstage: Scooter's uncle sells the mineral rights for Kenny's dressing room to Arabs. Also, Kermit tries to take a more "active" role in the show, with disastrous consequences.; Act: The Daring Young Frog on the Flying Trapeze.; Song: Kermit sings "Coconut" from a hospital bed, joined by a doctor and two nurses.; Talk Spot: Kenny tries to relax, while his dressing room turns into an oil-drilling site.; Muppet News Flash: Factory recall of defective hospital beds (including Kermit's).; Guest Act: "The Gambler".; UK Spot: "Knees Up Mother Brown".; Veterinarian's Hospital: Kermit ends up on the operating table and under a heavy light fixture.; Muppet News Flash: Factory recall of defective hospital lights.; Gonzo's Act: Kermit and Miss Piggy get tangled up in Gonzo's catapult sky-writing act.; Guest Act: Everyone joins Kenny in singing "Love Lifted Me".
4.07 (79)	Linda Lavin	7 December 1979	406
Backstage: Miss Piggy creates chaos among the cast as she co-opts the show as a surprise This Is Your Life-style birthday tribute to Kermit.; Song: Various Muppets adopt Kermit-like attributes and sing "Be a Frog".; Guest Act: Linda sings "The More I See You" backed by the Electric Mayhem.; UK Spot: Robin and some other frogs perform "Frog Kissin'".; Song: Statler and Waldorf reminisce and sing "It Was a Very Good Year".; Veterinarian's Hospital: Robin ends up on the table.; Act: A visiting Wayne and Wanda remind Kermit why he fired them.; Guest Act: Linda sings "Beyond the Blue Horizon", and the whole cast joins her.
4.08 (80)	John Denver	14 December 1979	401
Backstage: Kermit tries to convince the cast to go camping in the swamp.; Song: "Why Can't We Be Friends?"; Guest Act: "Garden Song"; Swedish Chef: Squirrel Stew.; Talk Spot: Gonzo asks John Denver for gardening tips.; Song: Miss Piggy sings "Trees".; Song: Other pigs attempt to climb a mountain while singing "The Happy Wanderer".; Guest Act: "Grandma's Feather Bed".; Note: This episode was included in the Disney+ release in the U.S. and Australia only. Unavailable on Disney+ elsewhere in the world.
4.09 (81)	Arlo Guthrie	21 December 1979	408
Backstage: The casts prepares for a quiet "family" evening, and the Swedish Chef attempts to cook a "home meal".; Guest Act: "Grocery Blues".; Muppet News Flash: Livestock gestation periods and bumper crops.; Song: Cows sing "Elegance".; Swedish Chef: A turkey refuses to be skewered.; At the Dance: Violence breaks out at the country square dance.; UK Spot: "A Horse Named Bill".; Guest Act: "Git Along, Little Dogies".; Swedish Chef: No roast piggy or "bif".; Fozzie's Act: Fozzie reads a poem by Robert Frost, and Gonzo interrupts him, singing Hernando's Hideaway.; Swedish Chef: The chef decides to make "veggie-weggie" stew.; Guest Act: "Sailing Down This Golden River".; Act: Vitamin pills for dinner.
4.10 (82)	Liza Minnelli	28 December 1979	414
Backstage: Kermit plays a hard-boiled private eye who gets embroiled in a murder mystery on a movie set. As expected, Fozzie provides worse than no help at all as a Patrolbear.; Guest Act: Liza performs "Copacabana" in character as movie actress Liza O'Shaugnessy.; Song: After the movie director is murdered, Gonzo rallies the shocked cast to sing "Great Day".; UK Spot: A pack of Muppet dogs performs "Pass That Peace Pipe", during which they are all murdered.; Guest Act: After he is cold-cocked by an unknown assailant, Kermit despairs of solving the case. Liza attempts to reassure him with a song that turns into a duet: "A Quiet Thing". At the end, a body falls from the wardrobe.; Guest Act: Liza hams up a fake death scene to reveal the real killer(s). Afterwards, she performs "Everything's Coming Up Roses" with the cast.
4.11 (83)	Dizzy Gillespie	4 January 1980	413
Backstage: Statler calls in sick (of the show), and Waldorf's wife Astoria takes his place. Also, the show is audited for noise levels after complaints about Floyd and Zoot's back alley jam sessions.; Song: A fishy rendition of "Blue Fish Blues".; Guest Act: Dizzy performs "St. Louis Blues" with the Electric Mayhem.; Veterinarian's Hospital: A porcine patient declares his love for Nurse Piggy.; UK Spot: "Do Wah Diddy Diddy".; Guest Act: Dizzy scats "Little Bit of Dis" with Floyd and Zoot.; Fozzie's Act: Waldorf's wife finishes Fozzie's jokes.; Guest Act: "Swing Low Sweet Cadillac".
4.12 (84)	Phyllis George	11 January 1980	412
Backstage: Phyllis hosts the first annual Muppet Awards (the "Freds"), and the competition brings out the best and worst in some of the cast.; Song: The Swedish Chef's rendition of "Yes, We Have No Bananas" is nominated for the "Best Song" category.; Pigs in Space: Aware of their nomination for the "Best Sketch" category, the Swinetrek Crew ham things up more than usual.; Guest Act: Phyllis sings another "Best Song" nominee: "Carbon Paper", accompanied by Rowlf on piano.; Act: The Dancing Mountains win "Best Performance by an Inanimate Object". Everyone dreads their acceptance.; Act: Fozzie loses "Funniest Comedy Performance" to Billy the Bear, who rubs it in during his acceptance.; UK Spot: An interview of the Flying Zucchini Brothers, winners of "Best Foreign Act", flies out of control.; Song: Phyllis introduces Rowlf performing another "Best Song" nominee: "You and I and George".; Act: Link presents the "Best Stunt" award to the Falling Alfonzos, who drop in to accept it.; Act: Scooter presents the numerous "Best Guest Star" nominees to the tune of "I Am the Very Model of a Modern Major-General". Phyllis announces the winner: herself.; Veterinarian's Hospital: Dr Bob is confident of winning "Best Sketch" category, and Nurse/Miss Piggy — starring in both nominated sketches — is even more so.; Act: Phyllis presents the "Performer of the Year" award, which comes down to Miss Piggy and Kermit.; Guest Act: Phyllis and the cast sing "There's No Business Like Show Business".
4.13 (85)	Lola Falana	18 January 1980	411
Backstage: Gonzo is quitting the show for a film career in Bombay. With Scooter's help, Kermit finds a replacement act.; Song: The chickens perform "Pick a Little, Talk a Little".; Guest Act: Lola dances and performs "He's the Greatest Dancer" with multiple Muppet monsters. Gonzo joins them.; Song: Gonzo cries while singing "My Way". Kermit comforts him.; UK Spot: A jealous Camilla clucks "I'm Gonna Wash That Man Right Outa My Hair" accompanied by the other chickens.; Muppet Sports: Tree-staring contest.; Guest Act: Gonzo finds out he has lost his promised job in Bombay. Lola comforts him by singing "Smile".; Gonzo's Act: Gonzo tries to tap dance in oatmeal while singing "Top Hat".; Guest Act: Lola leads the cast in singing "United We Stand".
4.14 (86)	Dyan Cannon	25 January 1980	404
Backstage: Miss Piggy's dog Foo-Foo disappears after everyone 'passes the bark' on dog-sitting him. She becomes increasingly frantic and wrathful in her search for him.; Song: Geri and the Atrics perform "Hound Dog".; Guest Act: Dyan performs "Civilization" with Quongo the Gorilla and other jungle denizens — and a few penguins.; Veterinarian's Hospital: An elderly lady (one of the Atrics).; UK Spot: Rowlf performs "Man's Best Friend" with several other howling dogs.; Swedish Chef: Hottie-doggies.; Guest Act: Dyan performs a canine version of "Big Spender" in a pet shop.
4.15 (87)	Anne Murray	1 February 1980	415
Backstage: Scooter ignores the theater's ban on skateboards, resulting in chaos on and off stage.; Song: Miss Piggy, Link and the other pigs sing "I Get Around" as a leather-clad gang of road hogs.; Guest Act: Anne sings "Snowbird", interrupted by a Dodo's bad puns.; Muppet News Flash: Explosive paper from Muppet Labs.; Act: The disgruntled Mexican Hat Dancers are replaced at the last minute by the inexplicable "Trudge Trudge Streak Streak" from the planet Koozebane.; UK Spot: Milton Miller and His Farmyard Philharmonic Trio perform "The Old Sow".; Guest Act: An absent-minded Zoot comes to Anne's dressing room in search of his saxophone, and he and the Electric Mayhem join her in a performance of "Walk Right Back".; Act: Beauregard experiences a ghostly visitation as he performs "Dancing on the Ceiling". (Cut from Disney+ showing); Muppet Sports: World Record Bagpipe Eating.; Guest Act: Anne closes the show with "Everything Old Is New Again", while the regular cast plays their "roll".
4.16 (88)	Jonathan Winters	8 February 1980	416
Backstage: The show may be under a Gypsy curse.; Song: Pigs sing "Tiger Rag" with Butch and Sundance.; Guest Act: Fozzie helps Jonathan with props and impressions.; Fozzie's Act: Scooter and Fozzie sing "On Her Doorstep", and they are joined by aliens.; Talk Spot: Jonathan talks to a shark.; Bear on Patrol: A pickpocket octopus.; UK Spot: Annie Sue and the other pigs join the Gypsy lady in singing "Golden Earrings".; Muppet Labs: A luggage compressor.; Talk Spot: Jonathan talks to an alien.; Song: A caterpillar sings "You'll Never Walk Alone". (Cut in Nickelodeon airing); Act: After everyone (except the Newsman) starts to speak mock-Swedish, trolls dance to "Country Gardens".
4.17 (89)	Christopher Reeve	15 February 1980	418
Backstage: Miss Piggy is enamoured with this week's Superman guest star, and Kermit becomes a little jealous.; Song: Kermit sings "Disco Frog".; Guest Act: Christopher Reeve fills in for Gonzo playing "Hamlet". Things don't go well, so he ends up singing "Brush Up Your Shakespeare" with some help from the cast.; Muppet News Flash: Killer lamb on the lam.; Veterinarian's Hospital: Christopher Reeve scrubs in.; UK Spot: Floyd and friends annoy Sam the Eagle with "Sam's Song".; Song: Fozzie and a matador try to play "The Toreador Song", but are chased offstage.; Muppet Labs: A heated milking machine.; Song: Miss Piggy "accidentally" injures Rowlf as he tries to accompanies to her singing "Never Before, Never Again".; Guest Act: Christopher Reeve substitutes for Rowlf on piano, as Miss Piggy sings "East of the Sun (and West of the Moon)".
4.18 (90)	Lynda Carter	22 February 1980	419
Backstage: Inspired by their Wonder Woman guest star, Scooter and the cast take a correspondence course: "How to Be a Superhero" or "Invincibility Made Easy". Somehow, they manage to survive.; Song: Janice is about to be sacrificed by stone idol worshippers. She is rescued by her Electric Mayhem bandmates as she performs "With a Little Help from My Friends".; Guest Act: Lynda performs "The Rubberband Man" with a band of elastic bands.; Muppet News Flash: The curse of the Egyptian crocodile god.; Song: Floyd sings "While My Guitar Gently Weeps".; UK Spot: Kermit questions Sam the Eagle's list of disgusting items on the show.; Act: Miss Piggy saves the day as Wonder Pig.; Act: A big, bad wolf threatens a flock of sheep singing "The Whiffenpoof Song". They are rescued by a Super Sheep. (Cut in Nickelodeon airing); Guest Act: Lynda sings "Orange Colored Sky" against a backdrop of superheroic violence.
4.19 (91)	The stars of Star Wars (Mark Hamill, Peter Mayhew, and Anthony Daniels)	29 February 1980	417
Backstage: Luke Skywalker, C-3PO, and R2-D2 break the theater's walls (including the fourth) in search of a kidnapped Chewbacca. Luke's "cousin" Mark Hamill tries to join in on the act.; Song: A shepherd and his flock perform "Rama Lama Ding Dong".; Muppet News Flash: National Sheepdog Trials. (Scene of Scooter practicing for his big act after this segment cut in Nickelodeon airing); Guest Act: Mark Hamill joins Angus McGonagle in gargling "Summertime", until Animal chases them offstage. (Cut in Nickelodeon airing); UK Spot: An eel sings "Three Little Fishies".; Song: Scooter performs "Six String Orchestra", and imagines he is backed by the Electric Mayhem.; Pigs in Space: Skywalker, C-3PO and R2-D2 commandeer the Swinetrek, and they encounter Dearth Nadir (Gonzo).; Muppet News Flash: Hard Venus landing. (Cut in Nickelodeon airing); Pigs in Space: The cast of Star Wars and the crew of the Swinetrek confront Dearth Nadir and reunite with Chewbacca on the planet Koozebane.; Guest Act: Part 2 of Pigs in Space devolves into a song-and-dance act with everyone performing a medley: "You Are My Lucky Star" and "When You Wish Upon a Star".
4.20 (92)	Andy Williams	7 March 1980	422
Backstage: Everyone has heard about Kermit's engagement to Miss Piggy, except Kermit. Also, the show gets even "cheesier" than usual.; Song: Fozzie sings "Green Door".; Guest Act: A scheming Miss Piggy persuades Andy to sing "Where Do I Begin (Theme from Love Story)" in an attempt to woo Kermit.; Muppet News Flash: Roving bands of cheese.; Veterinarian's Hospital: A "punny" bunny.; UK Spot: Kermit tries to get to know Sam the Eagle a little better.; Guest Act: Andy forms a barbershop quartet with three look-alike Muppets to sing "Jubilee Time".; Muppet Labs: Unwanted pet converter.; Guest Act: Kermit joins Andy to sing a medley: "Two of a Kind" / "How About You?" / "Give Me the Simple Life" / "I Love a Piano".
4.21 (93)	Doug Henning	14 March 1980	421
Backstage: Fozzie tries his hand at some magic.; Song: Miss Piggy sings "It's Magic" with magic accompaniment by Kermit.; Guest Act: Doug slices a monster into sections.; Song: Robin sings "Leave Me Some Magic".; Veterinarian's Hospital: Dr. Bob pulls rabbits out of the table.; UK Spot: Fozzie sings "Run, Rabbit, Run" as a farmer tries to shoot his magic rabbits.; Talk Spot: Doug performs some small magic with a small frog (Robin).; Song: The Switcheroos sing "There'll Be Some Changes Made".; Fozzie's Act: Fozzie tries to perform the Indian Rope Trick.; Guest Act: Monsters help Doug with his "metamorphosis" trick.
4.22 (94)	Alan Arkin	21 March 1980	420
Backstage: Alan accidentally drinks Dr Bunsen Honeydew's Jekyll-and-Hyde potion.; Song: "The Devil Went Down to Georgia".; Song: The Bun-Bun Brothers sing "Zip-a-Dee-Doo-Dah", while a monstrous Alan wreaks havoc.; Song: Rowlf helps Fozzie sing "I (Don't) Got Rhythm".; Pigs in Space: The crew becomes unbalanced.; Fozzie's Act: Fozzie's crowd is tougher than usual.; Song: An old lady with a pet python sings "Let Me Go, Lover".; Guest Act: "Pig Shuffle".
4.23 (95)	Carol Channing	28 March 1980	423
Backstage: Miss Piggy copes with buyer's remorse over an ill-fitting pair of new shoes.; Song: Big-eyed Muppets help Carol sing a medley: "Jeepers Creepers" / "I, Yi, Yi, Yi, Yi (I Like You Very Much)" / "Them There Eyes".; Guest Act: Kermit (as a reporter) interviews Carol as former silent film star "Whistling" Cecilia Sisson.; Song: A dancing monster duet: "Your Feet's Too Big".; UK Spot: Floyd and Beauregard play "Wave" to some penguins.; Pigs in Space: Dr. Bob and Nurse Janice from Veterinarian's Hospital visit the crew.; Swedish Chef: Meatloaf(ers).; Guest Act: Miss Piggy helps Carol sing "Diamonds Are a Girl's Best Friend".
4.24 (96)	Diana Ross	4 April 1980	424
Backstage: Statler and Waldorf decide to keep score, and the audience is harder than usual to please.; Song: Various birds and reptiles perform "I Go to Rio".; Fozzie's Act: Fozzie is booed off stage before he delivers his first joke.; Guest Act: Diana dances with large birds and sings "Love Hangover".; Song: The Gills Brothers sing "Aunt Chovy", and the audience (literally) eats them up. (Cut in Nickelodeon airing); Pigs in Space: Link and Strangepork inadvertently "gaslight" First Mate Piggy.; UK Spot: Beaker performs "Feelings" to a tough crowd, backed by Rowlf and the Electric Mayhem.; Guest Act: Diana sings "Last Time I Saw Him", backed by the Electric Mayhem.; Gonzo's Act: Gonzo bravely volunteers to follow Diana with an "indescribable" act.; Fozzie's (and Guest) Act: A supportive Diana urges Fozzie to try his stand-up routine again, and follows it with a rendition of "Reach Out and Touch".

=== Season 5 (1980–1981) ===
The cold open featuring Scooter visiting the guest star's dressing room was replaced by a new opening in which Pops, the doorman, would greet each guest as they entered the theatre. New characters included Pops, Lips, and Gaffer the Cat. Two new puppeteers, Brian Muehl and Karen Prell, joined the troupe of Muppeteers during this season, and Betsy Baytos auditioned to perform in eight episodes.

No.	Guest star	Original release date	Prod. code
5.01 (97)	Roger Moore	5 October 1980	524
Backstage: This week's guest can't quite shed his secret agent image.; Song: Viking marauder pigs sing "In the Navy".; Guest Act: Miss Piggy flirts with an increasingly uncomfortable Roger while singing "On a Slow Boat to China".; Song: Lew Zealand and his singing fish get the hook for their gurgling rendition of "You Light Up My Life".; Veterinarian's Hospital: A wounded Viking marauder. (Cut in Nickelodeon airing); UK Spot: The orchestra jazzes things up with "How High the Moon".; Bear on Patrol: A handcuff salesman is not what he seems.; Muppet Sports: Cross-country billiards.; Muppet News Flash: Spies infiltrate the media.; Guest Act: Roger has a showdown with spies in disguise as he performs "Talk to the Animals".
5.02 (98)	James Coburn	19 October 1980	505
Backstage: Animal bonds with this week's tough-guy guest, and James Coburn in turn tries to help him find his center.; Act: An octopus ensemble plays "Temptation", and a discerning Animal doesn't like it.; Song: A performance of "(They Long to Be) Close to You" comes to a sticky end.; Guest Act: Betsy Bird's burlesque dance to "The Varsity Drag" opens a mobster melodrama from the Roaring 20's. Things goes from bad to worse, until James Coburn whips out his piccolo to lead everyone in a rousing rendition of "Alexander's Ragtime Band".; UK Spot: Betsy obliges an impressed Kermit by "winging" another dance to "Birdwalk". (Cut from Disney+ showing); Bear on Patrol: Link and Fozzie are hoodwinked by Banana-Nose Maldonado.; Guest Act: Per the guest's last minute "request", Kermit replaces the planned cowboy sketch with a serene tribute to Japanese culture, resulting in a Japanese-style square dance.
5.03 (99)	Brooke Shields	9 November 1980	506
Backstage: Rivalry, confusion, and size problems among the cast threaten to derail the Muppets' production of Alice in Wonderland.; Guest Act: Multiple Muppets sing the "Falling Song" to Brooke as Alice on her way down the rabbit hole. She then drinks a shrinking potion and follows the White Rabbit further.; Guest Act: A diminutive Alice/Brooke follows the Caterpillar's (Floyd's) advice to eat a bite of mushroom, but grows too much. Then, thanks to Dr Bunsen Honeydew, she shrinks too small and becomes lost.; Song: Humpty-Dumpty and company sing "These Are the Yolks, Folks".; UK Spot: Fozzie is disappointed he dressed as the wrong character (The Tin Woodman from The Wizard of Oz, whom he mistakenly identifies as the "Tin Woodsman"). Dr. Teeth and several other Muppets try to cheer him up with a medley of smiley songs: "When You're Smiling" / "Put on a Happy Face" / "Smiles" / "My Mammy" / "Happy Days Are Here Again".; Act: Various Muppets, including Rowlf and Scooter, recite and act out the poem "Jabberwocky".; Act: Alice/Brooke is still MIA, and the Trial scene (with Miss Piggy as the Queen of Hearts) proceeds without her.; Guest Act: Alice/Brooke reappears at her normal size, and Gonzo hosts the Tea Party as the Mad Hatter. The scene rapidly unravels amidst bad puns and nonsense, until Fozzie (still dressed as the Tin Woodman) makes an unplanned entrance, leading everyone in a quick rendition of "We're Off to See the Wizard".; Note 1: According to Brian Henson, Brooke helped build some of the Muppets in this episode. Note 2: This episode was not included in the Disney+ release.
5.04 (100)	Tony Randall	2 November 1980	513
Backstage: This week's guest star inadvertently casts a magic spell that turns Miss Piggy to stone. He spends the rest of the show trying to change her back.; Song: Pigs and a sabre-toothed tiger from the Stone Age rock out with "Yakety Yak".; Act: A Muppet Classical quartet prove that horseplay and chamber music don't mix with a disastrous performance of a minuet from Boccherini's "String Quintet in E Major".; Muppet News Flash: More musical mayhem.; Guest Act: Tony sings "Ti-Pi-Tin" backed by a trio of female Muppets. (Cut from Disney+ showing, introduction cut in Nickelodeon airing); UK Spot: Quongo and company sing (and throw) "A Lovely Bunch of Coconuts" at the Big Top.; Song: Dr Teeth gives a di-"vine" performance of "Poison Ivy". (Cut in Nickelodeon airing); Pigs in Space: A quiet day aboard the Swinetrek.; Guest Act: Scooter manages to reverse Miss Piggy's petrification during Tony's recital of "The Green Eye of the Little Yellow God".
5.05 (101)	Paul Simon	22 February 1981	511
Backstage: This week's guest inspires new feelings in Gonzo, and vice versa. Also, a stilt-walker meets with a series of mishaps. (Second backstage scene cut in Nickelodeon airing); Guest Act: The Muppets help Paul perform a Renaissance-themed "Scarborough Fair". Some are more helpful than others.; UK Spot: Floyd and Janice sing "50 Ways to Leave Your Lover", backed by Animal.; Guest Act: Pops convinces Paul to sing "Long Long Day" in his dressing room.; Veterinarian's Hospital: Gonzo. (Cut in Nickelodeon airing); Muppet News Flash: Library fine amnesty. (Cut in Nickelodeon airing); Song: Gonzo and the chickens sing "El Condor Pasa" with Gonzo's own lyrics, until an irate Paul steals the chickens away.; Song: Bobby Benson and his Baby Band sing "Baby Driver".; Guest Act: Paul performs "Loves Me Like a Rock" with the Electric Mayhem and a trio of backup singers.
5.06 (102)	Joan Baez	14 December 1980	503
Backstage: A naive Beauregard is kind to the rats, and finds that no good deed goes unpunished. Also, the guest does a few impressions.; Song: Various woodland creatures sing "Man Smart (Critters Smarter)" as a prelude to an act of eco-terrorism.; Guest Act: Joan sings "Honest Lullaby" to a Muppet child in his bedroom.; Pigs in Space: Strangepork sets a rat trap, but catches something much bigger.; UK Spot: Floyd and Janice perform the Beatles' "Blackbird".; Guest Act: Joan sings "The Night They Drove Old Dixie Down" in her dressing room.; Fozzie's Act: Fozzie performs his act in his "native" habitat.; Guest Act: Joan closes the show with "Will the Circle Be Unbroken?", and the whole cast joins her.; Note: This episode marks Rizzo the Rat's major speaking role.
5.07 (103)	Linda Ronstadt	26 October 1980	523
Backstage: Jealous of the guest star, Miss Piggy keeps Kermit locked in a moldy trunk for most of the show.; Act: Bugsy and his hypnotized horse.; Guest Act: Linda sings a calypso-tinged "Blue Bayou" in a swampy setting.; Swedish Chef: The Chef goes ballistic while trying to open some "boobly-boobly".; Muppet News Flash: Unidentified flying object.; Song: Rowlf sings "The Cat Came Back" as it's acted out behind him.; Guest Act: Linda sings "I've Got a Crush on You" to Kermit after freeing him from an old trunk. His freedom is short-lived.; UK Spot: Two depressed Muppets sing "I'm So Happy".; Guest Act: Linda rehearses "It's in His Kiss" in her dressing room with Janice and some other backup singers.; Act: Lola the Fan Dancer takes flight.; Pigs in Space: Miss Piggy literally drags her personal issues onstage.; Guest Act: Linda and Kermit perform a duet of "When I Grow Too Old to Dream".
5.08 (104)	Glenda Jackson	28 December 1980	507
Backstage: The theater is taken over by pirates, including "Black" (Glenda) Jackson, "Short" John Silver (Sweetums) and Eric the Parrot (disguised as a penguin).; Song: Gonzo and the chickens perform "Workin' at the Car Wash Blues".; Song: Some pirates get tied up singing "Tie-Aye-Aye the Man Down".; Fozzie's Act: The bear's banter is cut short as the captured theater puts to sea.; Guest Act: Glenda and the Pirates sing "The Walloping Window Blind" under full sail.; UK Spot: Eric the Parrot sings "Carolina in the Morning" while the Swedish Chef sizes him up for a stew.; At the Dance: The dancers try to find their sea legs.; Muppet Sports: Yardarm hanging.; Guest Act: The grand finale is a battle at sea, sprinkled with a medley of maritime melodies: "Rule, Britannia!" / "Sailing, Sailing" / "Anchors Aweigh" / "El Rancho Grande" / "Dead Man's Chest".
5.09 (105)	Loretta Swit	12 October 1980	502
Backstage: Miss Piggy publicizes a rumor that she and Kermit are secretly married. A flustered and overdramatic Kermit blows his top and tries to fire her.; Song: Farmer Gonzo rounds up a posse of poultry to save some hens from a predatory performance of "Ain't Nobody Here But Us Chickens".; Guest Act: Loretta performs "I Feel the Earth Move" with Thog.; Veterinarian's Hospital: Loretta scrubs in for Nurse Piggy. (Cut in Nickelodeon airing); UK Spot: Rowlf leads the cast in a farewell rendition of "Auld Lang Syne" for Miss Piggy, with a few irreverent bars of "For She's a Jolly Good Porker" thrown in.; Song: A tearful Miss Piggy sings "Some of These Days" as she packs her things to leave.; Pigs in Space: The Swinetrek crew deals with an undergarment crisis while Loretta briefly replaces First Mate Piggy.; Guest Act: Loretta coaxes Kermit and Piggy into singing "Side by Side by Side" with her. Then the whole cast joins them for "What Would We Do Without You?"
5.10 (106)	Hal Linden	11 January 1981	517
Backstage: Kermit gives Statler and Waldorf a chance to run the show.; Song: "Who Put the Bomp (in the Bomp, Bomp, Bomp)" by Geri and the Atrics.; Song: A messy performance of "Drinking Song" by the Salzburg Sauerkraut Singers.; Guest Act: Hal tries to sing patriotic songs ("The Yankee Doodle Boy", "You're A Grand Old Flag", "This Land Is Your Land" and "Stars and Stripes Forever"). He is constantly interrupted by Gonzo's holiday-themed numbers ("Jingle Bells", "Sleigh Ride", "Winter Wonderland" and "Happy Holiday").; UK Spot: Two working-class British blokes sing "Ob-La-Di, Ob-La-Da"; Guest Act: Robin and Hal commiserate about things beyond their control and sing "If We Ruled the World". (Cut from Disney+ showing); Song: Miss Piggy sings "Just an Old Fashioned Girl" with a South Asian flavor.; Guest Act: Hal and the Electric Mayhem struggle to perform "When the Saints Go Marching In" as Beauregard tests the trapdoors.
5.11 (107)	Jean-Pierre Rampal	30 November 1980	510
Backstage: Miss Piggy's command of the French language is called into question.; Song: The Electric Mayhem performs "Rockin' Robin".; Guest Act: Jean-Pierre performs "Lo! Hear the Gentle Lark" with Miss Piggy.; Bear on Patrol: Fozzie arrests a car for double-parking.; Veterinarian's Hospital: Everybody does the Conga.; UK Spot: An accordion player performs "La Seine" against a backdrop of French stereotypes (street cafe scene, histrionic lovers, berets, etc).; Guest Act: Jean-Pierre performs "The Little Shepherd" in his dressing room in front of a group of birds.; Muppet Labs: An electric sledgehammer.; Muppet News Flash: Electric sledgehammer on the loose.; Guest Act: Jean-Pierre and the rats perform "Ease On down the Road" as part of a modified version of "The Pied Piper of Hamelin".
5.12 (108)	Carol Burnett	8 February 1981	515
Backstage: Gonzo hosts a dance marathon, but the guest isn't wild about being At the Dance for the entire show.; Guest Act: Changes in tempo make Carol lose her temper as she tries to sing "Watch What Happens" on the dance floor.; Pigs in Space: A captive alien is fed up with First Mate Piggy.; UK Spot: Everybody dances the "Poke Me Polka".; Guest Act: A despondent Carol sings "But Not For Me" as her Charwoman character.; Guest Act: Carol tries to clear the dance floor for her "Lonely Asparagus" act by tiring the dancers out with an accelerating rendition of "I Was Made for Dancin'".; Guest Act: Carol tries to squeeze in her "Lonely Asparagus" sketch at the end of the show.
5.13 (109)	Johnny Cash	1 February 1981	521
Backstage: In honor of this week's guest, the show is broadcast live over WHOG, a country music station run by a corn-pone control freak called Big Tiny Tallsaddle.; Song: A performance of "The Martins and the Coys" ends abruptly in gunplay.; Guest Act: Johnny sings "(Ghost) Riders in the Sky", while Gonzo and his chickens try to provide a spectral spectacle.; UK Spot: Lew Zealand and the Gills Brothers sing "Goodnight Sardine".; Guest Act: Rowlf regrets his decision to accompany Johnny singing "Dirty Old Egg-Sucking Dog".; Fozzie's Act: Fozzie is forced to share the stage with a rival comic.; Guest Act: Lubbock Lou and his Jughuggers back Johnny as he sings "Orange Blossom Special" and "Jackson". Miss Piggy joins him for the latter.
5.14 (110)	Melissa Manchester	16 November 1980	512
Backstage: The show gets even more out of control than usual.; Song: The Vienna Downhill Boys' Choir skis and sings "Tumblin' Tumbleweeds".; Guest Act: There's some clowning around while Melissa sings "Don't Cry Out Loud".; Song: Beauregard plays a "rockin'" "Oh! Susanna" on his harmonica.; Muppet News Flash: Falling beef.; Pigs in Space: The Creature from the Crab Nebula.; UK Spot: Fozzie has trouble keeping up with Pops while performing "Once in Love with Amy".; Guest Act: Floyd and Melissa discuss the blues, then sing "Whenever I Call You Friend" with the rest of the cast.; Act: The Teeterini Family demonstrates how important the teeter board is to their act.; Song: Three birds play "How Much Is That Doggie in the Window?" on a guitar. (Cut in Nickelodeon airing); The Swedish Chef: Springy chickee.; Guest Act: A flamenco-flavored rendition of "Your Cheatin' Heart", acted out by Melissa, Link and Annie Sue.
5.15 (111)	Señor Wences and Bruce Schwartz	23 November 1980	508
Backstage: Kermit dedicates this week's show to puppetry in its many forms. The cast is variously inspired, irritated or confused.; Song: Pinocchio and fellow toy puppets perform "Puppet Man" for Geppetto (played by Pops).; Guest Act: Ventriloquist Señor Wences talks and sings with his signature dummies Johnny and Pedro, and spins a plate.; Veterinarian's Hospital: Pinocchio comes in for a nose job.; The Swedish Chef: The chef shows us how "These Lumps Are Made for Walkin'".; Guest Act: Lew Zealand tells Señor Wences his phone isn't working. The mischievous old ventriloquist has a surprise for him.; UK Spot: A supportive Kermit watches as Beauregard tries his hand(s) at Punch-and-Judy-style puppetry. Miss Piggy is not so supportive.; Guest Act: Puppeteer Bruce Schwartz tells a Japanese ghost story through Bunraku-style puppetry.; Fozzie's Act: Fozzie loses control of his new marionette act.; Guest Act: Cecilia the chicken joins Señor Wences, Johnny and Pedro.
5.16 (112)	Debbie Harry	25 January 1981	509
Backstage: Robin's Frog Scout troop visits the show.; Song: A hunchback and a gargoyle take over singing "For Me and My (Gar)Goyle" from a Wanda-less Wayne.; Muppet News Flash: The Newsman runs "a-fowl" of a fashion designer.; Guest Act: Debbie searches through a rogues' gallery of Muppet monsters as she sings "One Way or Another".; UK Spot: A little girl and her beetle sing "Forgiven".; Guest Act: Kermit persuades Debbie to sing a duet of "Rainbow Connection" with him.; Pigs in Space: A meteor storm creates the biggest plot hole yet.; Act: The Frog Scouts' drill team fills in at the last minute when the booked performer (Quongo the gorilla) is stuck in traffic.; Guest Act: Debbie performs "Call Me" with a group of Muppet punks.
5.17 (113)	Gene Kelly	4 January 1981	501
Backstage: Gene Kelly believes he was invited as Kermit's guest to watch the show, and refuses to perform. Also, Beauregard believes the end of the world is near. (Scenes involving Prince Rudolph and his invisible cheeseburger, Gene thanking Beauregard for the sponge mop, and Lubbock Lou and his Jughuggers cut in Nickelodeon airing); Song: Animals of the Antarctic warm the audience up with "Jambalaya".; Guest Act: Kermit tricks Gene into "teaching" him to dance to two numbers: "Frère Jacques" and "The Worry Song".; Veterinarian's Hospital: Beauregard is worried sick about the coming apocalypse.; UK Spot: Two male dogs perform "Fit as a Fiddle" while competing for a female dog's attention.; Guest Act: Gene starts singing a duet of "You Wonderful You" with Miss Piggy, but is forced to finish with Gonzo when she is called to the stage.; Pigs in Space / Muppet News Flash: And the meaning of life is...; Guest Act: Once again, a conniving Kermit must trick Gene into performing "Singin' in the Rain".
5.18 (114)	Gladys Knight	7 December 1980	516
Backstage: The rotted roof is taken in for repairs, and the cast is forced to perform al fresco.; Song: Egyptian mummies perform "Night and Day".; Guest Act: Gladys performs "Friendship Train".; Veterinarian's Hospital: A singing weatherman.; UK Spot: Animal tries to club various prehistoric creatures as a caveman sings "Alley Oop".; Guest Act: Rowlf tickles the ivories as Gladys sings "God Bless the Child".; Act: Fozzie assists a blind knife thrower.; Guest Act: Gladys and company sing "I Heard It Through the Grapevine", despite the uncooperative weather.
5.19 (115)	Wally Boag	18 January 1981	520
Backstage: The usual backstage drama is at an all-time low as the Muppets join in saluting their guest's vaudeville roots.; Act: The Flying Zucchini Brothers turn themselves into human cannonballs. And what goes up...; Song: ...must come down. On Lottie Lemon and her Singing Wig, as they perform "Just Squeeze Me".; Guest Act: Balloon animal psychoanalysis.; Act: Rowlf provides musical cues and commentary for Miss Piggy and Foo-Foo's dog act.; UK Spot: The Leprechaun Brothers (the Swedish Chef, Animal and Beaker) sing something resembling "Danny Boy".; Guest Act: Wally tortures a few tunes like "Old Folks at Home" out of the bagpipes, with a little help from the band.; Song: An inexplicable performance of the "Ying Tong Song". (Cut from Disney+ showing); Act: Dr. Salamander hypnotizes a sleepy Pops, who rises without waking.; Guest Act: Annie Sue helps Wally sing a toothsome version of "Pecos Bill".
5.20 (116)	Buddy Rich	15 February 1981	522
Backstage: Tonight's show is plagued by brown-outs and black-outs, and the cast's attempts to deal with the situation are predictably incompetent and bizarre. Muppet Labs to the rescue!; Song: Fozzie and company's "Good Day Sunshine" turns into "Dancing in the Dark".; Muppet News Flash: The Newsman asks for a bigger candle to read the news.; Guest Act: Buddy plays percussion on found objects as he makes his way to the stage.; Guest Act: Buddy tries to cheer up a despairing Beauregard with a duet of "You Musn't Be Discouraged".; Veterinarian's Hospital: The surgical staff is shocked by an electrician's story.; UK Spot: Brits on a double-decker bus sing "A Transport of Delight". (Cut from Disney+ showing); Guest Act: Buddy and Miss Piggy show each other their (karate) chops.; The Swedish Chef: Floating soufflé.; Guest Act: Animal vs Buddy in a drum battle.
5.21 (117)	Marty Feldman with Cookie Monster, Ernie, Bert, Grover, Count von Count, and two Anything Muppets	21 December 1980	518
Backstage: the Muppets decide to retell far fewer than 1001 of the Arabian Nights, and this week's guest is horribly miscast in the role of Scheherazade.; Song: Sinbad the Sailor (Kermit) and his amphibious crew placate an evil genie (Sweetums) with an anachronistic "Surfin' USA".; Guest Act: A genie (Marty) grants Aladdin (Gonzo) three wishes, one of which results in a chorus line of hens performing "In a Persian Market".; UK Spot: Some Muppets perform "Girlfriend of the Whirling Dervish" with vaguely Middle Eastern costumes and scenery.; Guest Act: Sam the Eagle has his doubts about Orville and Wilbur Wright being part of the Arabian Nights. He is not reassured when Marty and a trio of Muppet cops abruptly burst into "The Laughing Policeman". (Preceding backstage scene cut in Nickelodeon airing); Act: Fozzie is initially enthusiastic about his role in the story of Ali Baba and the Forty...er, Four...um, Three Thieves. The Muppet cast of Sesame Street joins him at the end to sing a pastiche of their theme song with "A Hot Time in the Old Town". ("Can You Tell Me How to Get to Sesame Street?" cut from Disney+ showing)
5.22 (118)	Chris Langham	1 March 1981	519
Backstage: A messenger brings news of the scheduled guest's last-minute cancellation. A desperate Kermit hires him as a replacement.; Song: Kermit and Robin have an ocean adventure while singing "Friendship".; Guest Act: Some low-key prop comedy from Chris.; Muppet News Flash: Falling stars.; Guest Act: Sam the Eagle doesn't quite know what to make of tonight's guest.; UK Spot: An international cast of canines sings "Maybe It's Because I'm a Londoner" while riding a double-decker bus.; Guest Act: Chris shares his new invention with the world.; Song: An Englishman repeatedly misidentifies a bovine creature. "The Gnu" repeatedly corrects him.; Guest Act: Gonzo's admiration leads to a "wooden" performance of "Hawaiian Cowboy" by Chris.; Note 1: Richard Pryor was to make a special guest appearance in this episode, but when it became apparent that he could not make it to the recording, writer Chris Langham was brought on to replace him. Note 2: This episode was not included in the Disney+ release.
5.23 (119)	Mac Davis	8 March 1981	514
Backstage: After an accident at Muppet Labs, Dr Bunsen Honeydew finds himself overwhelmed by HR issues.; Song: Clad in boaters and blazers, Fozzie and company cope with unchoreographed chaos to perform "Another Opening, Another Show". Meanwhile, Beauregard and Beaker are tied up backstage.; Guest Act: Mac sings "Baby Don't Get Hooked on Me" to mermaid Miss Piggy.; Muppet Labs: A copy machine mishap results in a disgruntled bevy of Beakers, and Dr. Honeydew on the run.; Guest Act: Link and several other cast members join Mac in singing "It's Hard to Be Humble".; UK Spot: Rowlf attempts to play "Jesu, Joy of Man's Desiring" while Beauregard tidies up around him.; Swedish Chef: Dr. Honeydew hides from the Beakers in a pot of soup.; Guest Act: Mac's rehearsal of "Poor Boy Boogie" is interrupted by the Beakers, whom he mistakes for backup singers.; Bear on Patrol: Fozzie and Link try to book a Beaker, when several more show up.; Guest Act: The Muppet Band accompanies Mac as he sings "I Believe in Music", and the whole cast joins him.
5.24 (120)	Shirley Bassey	15 March 1981	504
Backstage: Scooter somehow borrows millions of dollars' worth of gold for their guest's closing act. As a result, everyone is a little jumpy, especially the gold's suspicious security guard.; Song: The Electric Mayhem performs "Barnyard Boogie".; Guest Act: Shirley sings "Fire Down Below" in a gold foundry.; Muppet Labs: The next best thing to turning lead to gold.; Song: The Fazoobs perform "Isn't This a Lovely Day?"; UK Spot: The orchestra performs "After You've Gone".; Guest Act: The cast gathers 'round for Shirley's rendition of "Pennies from Heaven", but not necessarily to listen.; Muppet News Flash: Update on the stack of gold.; Act: Gonzo's conduction of a performance of "Liebesträume" devolves into swordplay. (Cut in Nickelodeon airing); Guest Act: Porcine thieves steal the gold during Shirley's performance of "Goldfinger", and she is handcuffed afterwards by the guard.

=== Special (2026) ===
No.	Guest star	Original release date
Special (121)	Sabrina Carpenter	4 February 2026
Guest Act: Sabrina Carpenter performs "Manchild".; Backstage: Kermit is faced with the task of cutting certain acts from the show. Misunderstanding Kermit, Fozzie cuts executive producer Seth Rogen.; Gonzo's Act: Gonzo attempts to complete an obstacle course on self-driving roller skates while reciting the names of every winner of the Academy Award for Best Supporting Actress.; Pigs in Wigs: Lady Scrappleton (Miss Piggy) finds herself in a love triangle with her husband and another lover (Pepe).; Backstage: Gonzo crashes through the room, taking the extremely long running order with him.; Song: Rizzo performs "Blinding Lights".; Backstage: Miss Piggy learns her act has been cut out of the show by Kermit, Kermit apologizes to Sabrina for the show falling apart, and Sabrina expresses her idolization for Piggy.; Muppet Labs: Focus Pocus eyedrops serum.; Backstage: Janice tricks Kermit into attempting mindfulness.; Muppet News Flash: "Maya Rudolph dead/alive."; Guest Act: Sabrina performs "Islands in the Stream" with Kermit and Miss Piggy.; Backstage: Kermit announces there is only time for one more act.; Song: The whole cast performs "Don't Stop Me Now".
