= Fortuosity =

"Fortuosity" is the first song in the 1967 motion picture The Happiest Millionaire which was written by the Sherman Brothers and performed by Tommy Steele playing the part of "John Lawless" (the butler). Richard Sherman stated that the word meant "Faith and Good Fortune". Apparently derived from "fortuitous", which refers to something that happens by fortune or chance, "fortuosity" is a Disney neologism and has a more positive meaning than "fortuitous" or that word's standard noun form, "fortuity", which means accident, chance, or an accidental occurrence. Steele also sings the song "I'll Always Be Irish" in the film.

== Other versions ==
"Fortuosity" has been covered by other performers:

- The Mills Brothers' 1968 album Fortuosity had it as the title track. This album also contained their top adult contemporary hit, "Cab Driver".
- Carol Burnett recorded a version with RCA Victor.
- Count Basie recorded a version with London.
- Vic Damone recorded a version with RCA Victor.
- Nancy Sinatra performed the song with the nine foot tall Muppet named "Thog" in her Las Vegas stage show.

== Disney Parks ==
The New Century Timepieces store on Disneyland's Main Street was named the Fortuosity Shop in October 2008.

This song is also part of the BGM loop for Main Street, U.S.A. at Disneyland, Magic Kingdom, and Disneyland Paris since 1992.
