= I'll Always Be Irish =

"I'll Always Be Irish" is a song from the film musical, The Happiest Millionaire which was written by the Sherman Brothers and sung by Tommy Steele as "John Lawless" explaining that he will be proud to be American, but that we will remain just as proud to be Irish. Steele also sings the song, "Fortuosity", in the film.

== Facts about the song ==
- The Sherman Brothers wrote this song as an ode to their mentor, Walt Disney who was also of Irish descent.
- The lyric alludes to John F. Kennedy, who was the immediate past United States President when The Happiest Millionaire was released: "And I'll bet someday we'll get an Irish President!"
