= The Happiest Millionaire =

1967 American musical film directed by Norman Tokar

- 1967 Theatrical poster
- Directed by: Norman Tokar
- Screenplay by: A. J. Carothers
- Story by: A. J. Carothers
- Based on: My Philadelphia Father by Cordelia Drexel Biddle
- Produced by: Walt Disney; Bill Anderson
- Starring: Fred MacMurray; Tommy Steele; Greer Garson; Gladys Cooper; Geraldine Page; Hermione Baddeley; John Davidson; Lesley Ann Warren
- Cinematography: Edward Colman
- Edited by: Cotton Warburton
- Music by: Jack Elliott
- Production company: Walt Disney Productions
- Distributed by: Buena Vista Distribution
- Release dates: June 23, 1967 (Hollywood premiere); November 30, 1967 (Radio City Music Hall)
- Running time: 164 minutes (Los Angeles premiere); 144 minutes (New York City premiere); 118 minutes (general release); 172 minutes (director's cut); 169 minutes (Edit on Disney+ that does not include the exit music)
- Country: United States
- Language: English
- Budget: $5 million
- Box office: $5 million (U.S./Canada rentals)

The Happiest Millionaire is a 1967 American musical film starring Fred MacMurray, based upon the true story of Philadelphia millionaire Anthony Drexel Biddle. The film, featuring music by the Sherman Brothers, was nominated for an Academy Award for Best Costume Design by Bill Thomas. The screenplay by A. J. Carothers was adapted from the play, based on the book My Philadelphia Father by Cordelia Drexel Biddle. Walt Disney acquired the rights to the play in the early 1960s. The film was the last live-action film to be produced by Disney before his death on December 15, 1966.

== Plot ==
In autumn 1916, Irish immigrant John Lawless has applied for a butler position with eccentric Philadelphia millionaire Anthony J. Drexel Biddle. Even though the family is a bit strange, Lawless soon learns that he fits right in. Mr. Biddle takes a liking to him immediately.

Mr. Biddle busies himself with his Biddle Boxing and Bible School (located in his stable) and with his alligators in the conservatory. He is also anxious to get America into the war in Europe, despite the government's policy of neutrality. His wife, Cordelia, stands quietly by, accepting his eccentricities with a sense of pride and class. Their two sons, Tony and Livingston, are headed to boarding school, not to be seen again. Their daughter, Cordy, is a tomboy with a mean right hook who was educated by private tutors and has had limited contact with conventional society. She is frustrated by her apparent inability to attract suitors and wants to see what is beyond the Biddle manor.

Mr. Biddle reluctantly lets Cordy go to a boarding school as well after some prodding from both Cordy and from his Aunt Mary. Cordy's roommate teaches her how to lure men with feminine wiles, and at a social dance hosted by her aunt and uncle, Cordy meets Angier Buchanan Duke and they fall in love. He tells Cordy that he is fascinated with the invention of the automobile and wants to head to Detroit to make his fortune there, instead of taking over his family's tobacco business.

That winter, Cordy comes back to her parents' home and tells them that she is engaged. At first, this is a difficult thing for Mr. Biddle to take. He does not want to give her up, but after meeting Angier and witnessing first-hand his Jiu Jitsu fighting skills, Mr. Biddle takes a liking to him and accepts the engagement. Then Cordy travels with Angier to New York City to meet his mother. Soon the Biddles and the Dukes are making arrangements for a very grand wedding.

It is by now spring 1917, and constant condescending comments from Angier's mother anger Cordy. To make matters worse, their families' elaborate planning for the "social event of the season", makes both Cordy and Angier feel pushed aside. The tension reaches a climax when Cordy learns that Angier has abandoned his plans for Detroit, and is instead taking his place in the family business, following his mother's wishes. Cordy angrily calls the wedding off, thinking of Angier as a mama's boy, and Angier storms out of the house. Both families are instantly in a tremendous state of upheaval. Mr. Biddle sends John Lawless to look after Angier.

John finds Angier at the local tavern, contemplating what he will do next, and tries to convince Angier to go back to Cordy. However, Angier is stubborn and thinks of other ways to deal with his problems, among other things saying that he wants to join the Foreign Legion. Angier unwittingly starts a bar fight (with a little help from John) and is hauled off to jail.

The next morning, Mr. Biddle comes to bail Angier out. He tells Angier he has to forget about his own dreams and accept his place in the family business. His words have the desired effect, inspiring Angier to defy his mother and elope with Cordy and go to Detroit. Cordy, however, believes her father talked Angier into it, so to prove his sincerity, amid the cheering of the cellmates, Angier throws Cordy over his shoulder and carries her out of the jail house to start their new life together.

=== Longer version ===
After Mr. and Mrs. Biddle return home a delegation of Marines arrive to inform him he has been made a "provisional captain" in the Marine Corps and is wanted immediately to go to Parris Island to continue training the recruits, now that America is finally entering the War. Mr. Biddle accepts with delight, and the hearty congratulations of his suddenly appearing Bible Boxing Class.

A car with two people drives toward a city skyline dominated by factories with smoke clouding the sky at sunset.

== Cast ==
- Fred MacMurray as Anthony J. Drexel Biddle, Cordy's father
- Greer Garson as Cordelia Bradley Biddle, Cordy's mother
- Gladys Cooper as Aunt Mary
- Geraldine Page as Sarah Pearson Angier Duke, Angier's mother
- Tommy Steele as John Lawless, the butler, a recent immigrant from Ireland
- Hermione Baddeley as Mrs. Worth, the Biddles' maid
- John Davidson as Angier Buchanan Duke, Cordy's fiancé
- Lesley Ann Warren as Cordelia "Cordy" Drexel Biddle
- Paul Petersen as Anthony Biddle, Cordy's brother
- Eddie Hodges as Livingston Biddle, Cordy's brother
- Joyce Bulifant as Rosemary, Cordy's roommate
- Sean McClory as Police Sgt.
- Jim McMullan as Lt. Powell
- William Wellman Jr. as Lt. Grayson
- Aron Kincaid as Walter Blakely
- Larry Merrill as Charlie Taylor
- Frances Robinson as Aunt Gladys

== Production ==
=== Origins ===
The film had its origins in the 1955 book My Philadelphia Father by Cordelia Biddle, as told to Kyle Crichton. The New York Times said the story was told with "charm". There was early interest in the book for stage adaptation. Crichton adapted the story into a play called The Happiest Millionaire, which opened on Broadway on November 20, 1956, at the Lyceum Theatre. Walter Pidgeon portrayed Anthony J. Drexel Biddle and George Grizzard played Angie. It was Pidgeon's first appearance on Broadway in 21 years, and MGM obtained film rights in exchange for permitting him to appear in the play. Howard Erskine and Joseph Hayes produced the play, and Guthrie McClintic was to direct, but he left the production before opening night. The New York Times called the production "decent and amusing" and Pidgeon "wonderful". The production ran for 271 performances, closing on July 13, 1957.

=== Development ===
Walt Disney acquired the rights to the play in the early 1960s, without any intent of making it into a musical. After the box-office success of Mary Poppins, My Fair Lady, and The Sound of Music, producer Bill Walsh decided to adapt Millionaire into a musical; Disney then reassigned him to Blackbeard's Ghost, replacing him with Bill Anderson.

Film composers the Sherman Brothers wanted Rex Harrison for the lead role, but Disney insisted on Fred MacMurray. (Regardless, Harrison was unavailable, shooting Doctor Dolittle for 20th Century Fox.)

In January 1966, a key role went to Tommy Steele, who had achieved success on Broadway in Half a Sixpence. Lesley Ann Warren, whom Disney had seen in the 1965 CBS television production of Rodgers and Hammerstein's Cinderella, made her screen debut in the film. She also met future husband Jon Peters during the film's production. The role of MacMurray's wife went to Greer Garson, who called the film "... a delightful Life with Father type picture. I don't have much to do but I love working with Fred MacMurray."

== Music ==
1. "Fortuosity" – Tommy Steele
2. "What's Wrong with That?" – Fred MacMurray and Lesley Ann Warren
3. "Watch Your Footwork" – Paul Petersen and Eddie Hodges
4. "Valentine Candy" – Lesley Ann Warren
5. "Strengthen the Dwelling" – Fred MacMurray and Biddle Bible Class
6. "I'll Always Be Irish" – Tommy Steele, Fred MacMurray and Lesley Ann Warren
7. "Bye-Yum Pum Pum" – Joyce Bulifant and Lesley Ann Warren
8. "Are We Dancing?" – John Davidson and Lesley Ann Warren
9. "I Believe in This Country" – Fred MacMurray
10. "Detroit" – John Davidson and Lesley Ann Warren
11. "When a Man Has a Daughter" – Fred MacMurray
12. "There Are Those" – Gladys Cooper, Tommy Steele (talking) and Geraldine Page
13. "Let's Have a Drink on It" – John Davidson, Tommy Steele, and Chorus
14. "It Won't Be Long 'Til Christmas" (Roadshow version only) – Greer Garson and Fred MacMurray
15. "Finale (Let's Have a Drink On It)" – Tommy Steele and Chorus
16. "Off Rittenhouse Square" (Unused song)

The song "Detroit" contains the lyric "F.O.B. Detroit". According to the Shermans, Disney overheard them singing the song and misheard the phrase as "S.O.B.", then scolded them for using such language in a Disney film. The Shermans corrected Disney and the three laughed about it.

The original cast soundtrack was released on Buena Vista Records in stereo (STER-5001) and mono (BV-5001) versions. A second cast recording with studio singers and orchestrations by Tutti Camarata appeared on Disneyland Records in stereo (STER-1303) and mono (DQ-1303).

The cast soundtrack was re-released on CD in 2002 (60781-7), remastered from the original eight-track master tapes to reduce the heavy reverb from the original LP. The soundtrack is currently available on iTunes.

"Are We Dancing?" was included on the 1992 CD compilation The Sherman Brothers. The song along with "Fortuosity" was included on the 2009 Sherman Brothers Songbook compilation set.

The Supremes covered "It Won't Be Long 'Til Christmas" for their planned album of Disney covers, but the tracks from that session were not released until the 1980s.

== Release ==
When Walt Disney died on December 15, 1966, the film's first cut had already been completed. Disney told Anderson to use his own judgement, but added, "Don't let the distribution people rush you..." Anderson wanted to shorten the film, as he disliked the musical number "It Won't Be Long 'Til Christmas" as performed by Greer Garson. Disney COO Card Walker wanted to excise even more material, and the two men fought bitterly over the extent of the cuts. The film opened at 164 minutes on a "reserved seating" basis.

Robert Sherman was in England during the film's Hollywood premiere at the Pantages Theatre, but he became furious when he discovered in the Los Angeles Times that a theater in the vicinity was showing a double feature of The Shaggy Dog and The Absent-Minded Professor at a much lower price. In order to satisfy requests from Radio City Music Hall, the site of the film's New York premiere, the studio cut 20 minutes from the film after the premiere. For the general release, the film was shortened even further to 118 minutes. It was not reissued and did not appear on television until 1984, when the 164-minute version was screened at the Los Angeles International Film Expo and aired on The Disney Channel.

=== Home media ===
The film was initially released through VHS on April 7, 1984. Disney later re-released the film through VHS on May 28, 1986, as part of Disney's "Wonderland Campaign". Both releases are of the 144-minute version.

Anchor Bay Entertainment released separate DVDs of both the long and short versions on July 20, 1999. The long version, presented on home video for the first time, was in 1.66:1 non-anamorphic widescreen, but the short version was 1.33:1.

Disney re-released the film on DVD on June 1, 2004, featuring only the long version and including the intermission music at the end of Act I and the exit music at the end of Act II, elements that had been missing from the Anchor Bay release.

The film became available on the Disney+ streaming service on June 11, 2021.

== Reception ==
Writing in The New York Times, Bosley Crowther wrote: "...the whole picture is vulgar. It is an over-decorated, over-fluffed, over-sentimentalized endeavor to pretend the lace-curtain millionaires are—or were—every bit as folksy as the old prize-fighters and the Irish brawlers in the saloon".

Roger Ebert of the Chicago Sun-Times wrote that "... adults will find the plot thin and the characters one-dimensional. Lots of kids will find little to hold their interest except the alligators. The children will wonder how John Davidson could have possibly been cast in such an innocent and naive role when he looks at least 25 years old. I mean, that's a little late to steal your first kiss. As for the musical numbers, I found them eminently forgettable, with the sole exception of a nicely staged Irish reel".

Reviewing the film for Life, Richard Schickel remarked: "What is missing, quite literally, is magic. The movie's length, period, cost, even its eccentric central figure indicate Disney was trying for another Mary Poppins. It desperately needs her magic umbrella to lift MacMurray and the whole project off the ground. But the people who created the highest moments in Poppins with the dance across the rooftops are absent".

Charles Champlin of the Los Angeles Times stated that the film was "a disappointment" and compared it unfavorably to Mary Poppins: "There is no such unity of interest and identification in The Happiest Millionaire. If there is not really anybody to root against (except maybe Geraldine Page as the tart-tongued Mrs. Duke), there are too many people to root for, and each of them is pursuing his own story-line".

== See also ==
- List of American films of 1967
