= Bruce Schwartz =

American puppeteer and sculptor (born 1957)

Bruce D. Schwartz (born 1957) is an American puppeteer and sculptor. By extension, he is also a mimic, storyteller, and clown. He uses a technique where, unlike most puppeteers, who usually hide their hands in gloves, or use strings or sticks, he does the opposite and shows his hands.

He performed the puppet acts in the movie The Double Life of Véronique. He has also been seen on Jim Henson's Muppet Show in 1977 with guest star Cleo Laine, as well as in 1980 with Señor Wences.

Following his career in theater arts, for which he received a MacArthur Fellowship (1988), he co-founded the grassroots Pasadena Yoga Co-op in 1994 and now owns and manages Yoga House in Pasadena with Farzanah Noori. Bruce has been teaching yoga since 1998.
