= The Mills Brothers discography =

The following is a discography of the jazz/swing vocal group The Mills Brothers.

== Albums ==
- Famous Barber Shop Ballads Volume One (Decca, 1946)
- Famous Barber Shop Ballads Volume Two (Decca, 1949)
- Souvenir Album (Decca, 1950)
- Wonderful Words (Decca, 1951)
- Meet the Mills Brothers (Decca, 1953)
- Four Boys and a Guitar (Decca, 1954)
- Louis Armstrong and the Mills Brothers (Decca, 1954)
- Singin' and Swingin' (Decca, 1956)
- Memory Lane (Decca, 1956)
- One Dozen Roses (Decca, 1957)
- The Mills Brothers in Hi-Fi: Barbershop Ballads (Decca, 1958)
- In a Mellow Tone (Vocalion, 1958)
- Mmmm...The Mills Brothers (Dot, 1958)
- Great Hits (Dot, 1958)
- Sing (London, 1959)
- Merry Christmas (Dot, 1959)
- Greatest Barbershop Hits (Dot, 1959)
- Let Me Call You Sweetheart (Dot, 1959)
- Glow with the Mills Brothers (Decca, 1959)
- Harmonizin' With (Decca, 1959)
- Barbershop Harmony (Decca, 1960)
- Our Golden Favorites (Decca, 1960)
- San Antonio Rose (Dot, 1961)
- Yellow Bird (Dot, 1961)
- Great Hawaiian Hits (Dot, 1961)
- Sing Beer Barrel Polka and Other Golden Hits (Dot, 1962)
- The End of the World (Dot, 1963)
- Say Si Si (Dot, 1964)
- Gems by the Mills Brothers (Dot, 1964)
- Sing for You (Hamilton, 1964)
- The Mills Brothers Today! (Dot, 1965)
- The Mills Brothers in Tivoli (Dot, 1966)
- These Are the Mills Brothers (Dot, 1966)
- Anytime! (Pickwick, 1967)
- The Board of Directors with Count Basie (Dot, 1967) (With Count Basie, peaked at No. 145 on the Billboard Top LPs)
- London Rhythm (Ace of Clubs, 1967)
- The Board of Directors Annual Report with Count Basie (Dot, 1968)
- My Shy Violet (Dot, 1968)
- Fortuosity with Sy Oliver (Dot, 1968)
- Dream a Little Dream of Me (Pickwick, 1968)
- Till We Meet Again (Pickwick, 1968)
- Dream (Dot, 1969)
- The Mills Brothers in Motion (Dot, 1969)
- Cab Driver, Paper Doll, My Shy Violet (Pickwick, 1969)
- No Turnin' Back (Paramount, 1970)
- What a Wonderful World (Paramount, 1972)
- A Donut and a Dream (Paramount, 1972)
- Louis and the Mills Brothers (MCA Coral, 1973)
- Half a Sixpence with Count Basie (Vogue, 1973)
- Opus One (Rediffusion, 1973)
- Cab Driver (Ranwood, 1974)
- Inspiration (ABC Songbird, 1974)
- 50th Anniversary (Ranwood, 1976)
- The Mills Brothers (Pickwick, 1976)

== Singles ==
Year	Single	Chart positions					
Year	Single	US	US C/B	US R&B	US A/C	US Country	UK
1931	"Tiger Rag"	1	—	—	—	—	—
1931	"Nobody's Sweetheart"	4	—	—	—	—	—
1931	"Gems from George White's Scandals" (with Bing Crosby & Boswell Sisters)	3	—	—	—	—	—
1932	"Dinah" (with Bing Crosby)	1	—	—	—	—	—
1932	"You Rascal, You"	3	—	—	—	—	—
1932	"Baby Won't You Please Come Home"	20	—	—	—	—	—
1932	"I Heard"	3	—	—	—	—	—
1932	"Good-bye, Blues"	4	—	—	—	—	—
1932	"Rockin' Chair"	4	—	—	—	—	—
1932	"Shine" (with Bing Crosby)	7	—	—	—	—	—
1932	"Chinatown, My Chinatown"	10	—	—	—	—	—
1932	"St. Louis Blues"	2	—	—	—	—	—
1932	"Sweet Sue"	8	—	—	—	—	—
1932	"Bugle Call Rag"	2	—	—	—	—	—
1932	"It Don't Mean a Thing (If It Ain't Got That Swing)"	7	—	—	—	—	—
1934	"I've Found a New Baby"	19	—	—	—	—	—
1934	"Swing It, Sister"	2	—	—	—	—	—
1934	"Money in My Pockets"	12	—	—	—	—	—
1934	"Sleepy Head"	2	—	—	—	—	—
1937	"Dedicated to You" (with Ella Fitzgerald)	19	—	—	—	—	—
1937	"Big Boy Blue" (with Ella Fitzgerald)	20	—	—	—	—	—
1937	"Darling Nelly Gray" (with Louis Armstrong)	19	—	—	—	—	—
1938	"Flat Foot Floogee" (with Louis Armstrong)	19	—	—	—	—	—
1938	"Sixty Seconds Got Together"	8	—	—	—	—	—
1939	"Sweet Adeline"	10	—	—	—	—	—
1939	"You Tell Me Your Dreams, I'll Tell You Mine"	14	—	—	—	—	—
1940	"Old Black Joe"	30	—	—	—	—	—
1940	"W.P.A." (with Louis Armstrong)	26	—	—	—	—	—
1942	"Paper Doll"	20	—	—	—	—	—
1943	"Paper Doll" (re-entry)	1	—	2	—	—	—
1943	"I'll Be Around"	17	—	—	—	—	—
1944	"You Always Hurt the One You Love"	1	—	5	—	—	—
1944	"Till Then"	8	—	1	—	—	—
1945	"I Wish"	6	—	4	—	—	—
1945	"Put Another Chair at the Table"	14	—	4	—	—	—
1946	"Don't Be a Baby, Baby"	12	—	3	—	—	—
1946	"I Don't Know Enough About You"	7	—	—	—	—	—
1946	"There's No One But You"	22	—	—	—	—	—
1946	"I Guess I'll Get the Papers and Go Home"	12	—	—	—	—	—
1947	"Across the Alley from the Alamo" (lyrics by Joe Greene)	2	—	2	—	—	—
1947	"Dream, Dream, Dream"	—	—	5	—	—	—
1947	"Oh! My Achin' Heart"	21	—	—	—	—	—
1947	"When You Were Sweet Sixteen"	15	—	—	—	—	—
1948	"Mañana (Is Soon Enough for Me)"	—	—	10	—	—	—
1948	"S-H-I-N-E"	—	—	10	—	—	—
1948	"Gloria"	17	—	—	—	—	—
1949	"I Love You So Much It Hurts Me"	8	—	8	—	—	—
1949	"I've Got My Love to Keep Me Warm"	9	—	—	—	—	—
1949	"Someday (You'll Want Me to Want You)"	5	—	—	—	—	—
1949	"Who'll Be the Next One (To Cry Over You)"	24	—	—	—	—	—
1950	"Daddy's Little Girl"	5	—	—	—	—	—
1950	"Nevertheless (I'm in Love with You)"	4	—	—	—	—	—
1952	"Be My Life's Companion"	7	—	—	—	—	—
1952	"The Glow-Worm"	1	1	—	—	—	10
1952	"Lazy River"	22	—	—	—	—	—
1953	"Twice as Much"	14	27	—	—	—	—
1953	"Say "Si Si""	12	19	—	—	—	—
1953	"Pretty Butterfly"	21	—	—	—	—	—
1953	"Who Put the Devil in Evelyn's Eyes"	23	—	—	—	—	—
1953	"The Jones Boy"	15	11	—	—	—	—
1954	"She Was Five and He Was Ten"	27	27	—	—	—	—
1954	"You Didn't Want Me When You Had Me (So Why Do You Want Me Now)"	22	—	—	—	—	—
1954	"A Carnival in Venice"	26	32	—	—	—	—
1954	"Go In and Out the Window"		41	—	—	—	—
1954	"How Blue?"	25	37	—	—	—	—
1955	"Suddenly There's a Valley"	45	—	—	—	—	—
1955	"Opus One"	—	29	—	—	—	—
1955	"Smack Dab in the Middle"	—	29	—	—	—	—
1956	"All the Way 'Round the World"	63	—	—	—	—	—
1956	"Standing on the Corner"	57	—	—	—	—	—
1957	"Queen of the Senior Prom"	39	41	—	—	—	—
1958	"Get a Job"	21	—	—	—	—	—
1959	"Yellow Bird"	70	84	—	—	—	—
1968	"Cab Driver"	23	21	—	3	—	—
1968	"My Shy Violet"	73	73	—	4	—	—
1968	"The Ol' Race Track"	83	78	—	16	—	—
1969	"The Jimtown Road"	—	131	—	13	—	—
1969	"Dream"	—	111	—	—	—	—
1970	"It Ain't No Big Thing"	—	—	—	—	64	—
1972	"Sally Sunshine"	—	118	—	—	—	—
"—" denotes releases that did not chart or were not released in that territory.
