= The Leif Garrett Collection =

Compilation album by Leif Garrett
- Released: January 13, 1998
- Recorded: 1976–1981
- Genre: Pop
- Length: 36:24
- Label: Rock 'n Roll Records
- Producer: Michael Lloyd; John D'Andrea; Shun Tokura

Leif Garrett chronology
My Movie of You (1981)	The Leif Garrett Collection (1998)	F8 (pronounced "Fate") (2003)

Professional ratings
Review scores
Source	Rating
AllMusic	4.5/5 stars

The Leif Garrett Collection is an album by Leif Garrett released in 1998 and features all 10 of his US Billboard Hot 100 hit singles plus two additional cuts ("New York City Nights" and "You Had To Go and Change On Me").

== Critical reception ==
Stephen Thomas Erlewine of AllMusic writes, "it's as thorough as a compilation as anyone could hope for, and while his music hasn't dated particularly well, it will give a nostalgic ride to anyone that thrilled to his episode of Behind the Music".

== Track listing ==
No.	Title	Writer(s)	Original album	Length
1.	"Runaround Sue"	Dion DiMucci; Ernie Maresca	Leif Garrett (1977)	2:19
2.	"The Wanderer"	Ernie Maresca	Leif Garrett	2:37
3.	"I Was Made for Dancin'"	Michael Lloyd	Feel the Need (1978)	3:12
4.	"Memorize Your Number"	Billy Kirkland	Same Goes for You (1979)	2:45
5.	"Feel the Need"	Abrim Tilmon	Feel the Need	5:37
6.	"When I Think of You"	James Lewis Williams	Feel the Need	3:01
7.	"You Had To Go and Change on Me"	Andrew J. DiTaranto; Jeff Harrington; Tony Papa; Jeff Pennig	Can't Explain (1980)	3:25
8.	"New York City Nights"	Andrew J. DiTaranto; Guy Hemric	Non-album single	2:46
9.	"Runaway Rita"	Jeff Harrington; Jeff Pennig; Shunichi Tokura	My Movie of You (1981)	2:48
10.	"Surfin' USA"	Chuck Berry; Brian Wilson; Mike Love	Leif Garrett	2:20
11.	"Put Your Head on My Shoulder"	Paul Anka	Leif Garrett	2:41
12.	"I Was Looking for Someone to Love"	Howard Greenfield; Michael Lloyd	Same Goes for You	2:53
Total length:				36:24

Track information and credits adapted from the album's liner notes.

== Musicians ==
- Leif Garrett – vocals
- No musicians are listed in the liner notes.

== Production ==
- Michael Lloyd – arranger, engineer, producer (Tracks 1–6, 8, 10)
- John D'Andrea – producer (Tracks 7, 9)
- Shun Tokura – producer (Track 9)
- Tony Papa – Remastering Supervisor
- Doug Haverty – Art Direction, Design
- Michael Childers – Photography
- Dick Zimmerman – Photography
- Catherine Farley – Supervisor
- Bob Fisher – Remastering
