= James Younger =

James Younger may refer to:

- Jim Younger (1848–1902), American outlaw and member of the James–Younger Gang
- Jimmy Younger (1907-1976), English footballer, see List of Bury F.C. players (1–24 appearances)
- Sam Younger (James Samuel Younger, born 1951), British media and charity manager
- James Younger, 5th Viscount Younger of Leckie (born 1955), British peer
- James Younger, of James & Michael Younger, an American country music group
