= 8-track =

8-track or eight-track may refer to:

- 8-track cartridge, an analog magnetic tape format used for consumer audio distribution from the late 1960s to the early 1980s
- 8-track, an eight-track reel-to-reel magnetic tape format used for multitrack recording in professional recording studios
- 8tracks, an online site for user-generated mixtapes

== See also ==
- 8-Track Flashback, an American television series broadcast on the VH1 network
- ADAT, a magnetic tape format used for the simultaneous digital recording of eight analogue audio or digital audio tracks
- Quadruple track, a railway line consisting of four parallel tracks
