= Michael Scott =

Michael Scott, Michael Scot, Mike Scott or Mickey Scott may refer to:

== Academics ==
- Michael Scot (1175–c. 1232), Scottish mathematician and astrologer
- Michael L. Scott (born 1959), American academic and computer scientist
- Michael Scott (academic) (fl. c. 2000), British academic at the North East Wales Institute of Higher Education
- J. Michael Scott (born 1941), American scientist, environmentalist and author
- Michael Scott (English author) (born 1981), English author, classicist, associate professor and television presenter
- Mike Scott, British linguist and designer of WordSmith Tools

== Entertainers ==
- Michael Scott (Irish author) (born 1959), Irish author
- Michael Scott (Scottish author) (1789–1835), Scottish author
- Michael James Scott (born 1981), American actor and singer
- Michael J. F. Scott, Canadian film and television producer and director
- Michael M. Scott (born 1955), American film director, producer and documentary filmmaker
- Michael T. Scott (born 1977), American comedy writer and animation director
- Michael "Dorkman" Scott, a filmmaker associated with Ryan vs. Dorkman
- Mike Scott (broadcaster) (1932–2008), British TV presenter
- Michael Scott, early stage name for British actor Michael Caine (born 1933)

== Musicians ==
- Michael Scott (American musician) (born 1971), American musician
- Michael Scott (opera director) (c. 1935–2019), founder of the London Opera Society
- Mike Scott (English musician), hardcore/punk songwriter, Vocalist of Lay It on the Line, ex-Phinius Gage
- Mike Scott (Scottish musician) (born 1958), Scottish musician/songwriter, founder of The Waterboys

== Politicians, government officials, judges and activists ==
- Michael Dishington Scott, chief justice of Tonga
- Michael Scott (British Army officer) (born 1941), former U.K. Military Secretary
- Michael Scott (diplomat) (1923–2004), British diplomat and colonial administrator
- Michael Scott (priest) (1907–1983), opponent of apartheid and advocate of nuclear disarmament
- Michael Scott Jr. (born 1975), Chicago alderman
- Mike Scott (politician) (born 1954), Canadian parliamentarian
- Michael Scott (Missouri politician), American politician

== Sportspeople ==
- Michael Scott (basketball) (born 1986), American basketball player
- Michael Scott (cricketer) (1933–2015), English cricketer
- Michael Scott (footballer, born 1993), Scottish football midfielder
- Michael Scott (footballer, born 2006), German football winger
- Michael Scott (golfer) (1878–1959), English golfer
- Michael Scott (rugby league) (died 1968), English rugby league footballer
- Michael Scott (rugby union, born 1969), New Zealand rugby union player
- Michael Scott (rugby union, born 1997), Scottish rugby union player
- Michael Scott (sports administrator) (born 1956), Australian sports administrator
- Mick Scott (born 1954), rugby league footballer
- Mickey Scott (1947–2011), Major League Baseball pitcher
- Mike Scott (baseball) (born 1955), American pitcher
- Mike Scott (basketball, born 1988), American basketball player
- Mike Scott (basketball, born 1986), American basketball player and coach

== Other people ==
- Michael Scott (Apple) (1943–2025), first CEO of Apple Computer
- Michael Scott (architect) (1905–1989), Irish architect

== Fictional characters ==
- Michael Scott (The Office), in the American TV series The Office, played by Steve Carell
