= Amy Evans (disambiguation) =

Amy Evans was a Welsh soprano and actress.

Amy Evans may also refer to:

- Amy Burkhard Evans, American actress
- Amy Evans (rugby union) (born 1990), Welsh rugby union player
- Amy Evans, Cougar Town character played by Lisa Kudrow
