= Lesley Rae Dowling =

South African singer-songwriter

Lesley Rae Dowling is a South African singer-songwriter.

== Music ==
Lesley Rae Dowling was discovered in Stellenbosch in 1980 by artist manager Paddy Lee Thorp. She released her first single (The Spaniard / Grips of Emotion) and album (Lesley Rae Dowling) in 1981. Many of her albums have been produced and co-written (and accompanied) by Tully McCully. Her music has won many South African music awards, including various Sarie (South African Recording Industry) awards, several SAMA awards, 3M Scotty awards, and an FNB SAMA award.

She declined the opportunity in the early 1980s to go international, as the cultural boycott of South Africa during the late apartheid era meant she would need to live in Ireland for six months a year, something she was not prepared to do.

She has a love/hate relationship with the music industry, and has never been comfortable with public performances. She lives on her farm, "De Groote Zalze" near Stellenbosch.

=== Albums ===
- Lesley Rae Dowling (1981)
- Unravished Brides (1982)
- Split (1983)
- Myths And Legends (1984)
- When The Night Comes (1986)
- Images (1989)
- The Best Of Lesley Rae Dowling (1990)
- Unbounded Waters (1993)
- Clear (1999)
- Conspirare - The Very Best Of (2001)
- State Of Grace (2004)
- Lesley Rae Dowling / Unravished Brides (2006)
- Split / When The Night Comes (2008)
- The Best Ballads of the Early Years (2011)
- Unbounded (2022)

=== Singles ===
- The Spaniard / Grips Of Emotion (7", 1981)
- Grips Of Emotion / Lady (7", 1981)
- I'm A Woman / Everyman (7", 1982)
- I Want You / 1917 (7", 1983)
- Give A Little / Jigsaw Man (7", 1985)
- I wanna dance with you / Renegade (7", 1986)
- It was the Wind [collaboration with Petit Cheval] (7", 1986)
- Living Without Conversation (7", 1987)
- Possession / Trade / Truth (CD Single, 1994)
- Innocent Child / I wanna dance with you (Format unknown, 2010)
