= Party Line (film) =

- Directed by: William Webb
- Written by: Richard Brandes; Tom Byrnes (story)
- Produced by: Kurt Anderson; Tom Byrnes; William Webb
- Starring: Richard Roundtree; Leif Garrett; Terence McGovern; Richard Brandes
- Cinematography: John Huneck
- Edited by: Paul Koval
- Music by: Sam Sorenson
- Distributed by: SVS Films
- Release date: October 1988
- Running time: 91 minutes
- Country: United States
- Language: English

Party Line is a 1988 American slasher film directed by William Webb.

== Plot ==
Two siblings lure married men from a party line so their disturbed brother can slit their throats with a straight razor. A detective investigates with his captain.

== Cast ==
Actor	Character
Richard Roundtree	Captain Barnes
Leif Garrett	Seth
Terence McGovern (as Terrence McGovern)	Simmons
Richard Brandes	Rick
Richard Hatch	Dan
Patricia Patts	Jennifer
Shawn Weatherly	Stacy
James O'Sullivan	Henry
Greta Blackburn	Angelina
Shelli Place	Mrs. Simmons
Marty Dudek	Butch
Karen Mayo-Chandler	Sugar Lips
James Paradise	Victim
Hank Baumert	Fernando
Lee Nicholl	Herk
Angela Gibbs	Beth
John T. Olsen	I.D. Cop
Edd Byrnes (as Ed Byrnes)	Maitre d'
