= Borrowed Hearts =

1997 made-for-television Christmas drama film

- DVD cover
- Genre: Drama; Fantasy; Romance
- Written by: Pamela Wallace; Earl Wallace
- Directed by: Ted Kotcheff
- Starring: Roma Downey; Eric McCormack; Shawn Alex Thompson; Sarah Rosen Fruitman; Héctor Elizondo
- Music by: John Welsman
- Countries of origin: United States; Canada
- Original language: English

Production
- Executive producers: Gary Delfiner; Roma Downey; Ed Gernon; Peter Sussman; Tom Todoroff
- Producer: Mary Kahn
- Production location: Toronto, Canada
- Cinematography: Michael Story
- Editor: Ralph Brunjes
- Running time: 91 minutes
- Production companies: Atlantis Films; CTV

Original release
- Network: CBS
- Release: November 30, 1997

Borrowed Hearts (also known as Borrowed Hearts: A Holiday Romance) is a 1997 made-for-television Christmas drama film directed by Ted Kotcheff and starring Roma Downey and Eric McCormack.

== Plot ==
Sam Field (Eric McCormack) is a high-powered businessman and scion of a rich industrialist family with his own factory. Though a workaholic, Sam manages to enjoy a playboy lifestyle, having one girlfriend after the other, while struggling with never having lived up to his father's expectations. One day, his spokesman and best friend Dave Hebert (Shawn Alex Thompson) explains that a wealthy potential buyer of his company believes that Sam is a loyal family man. Even though he is not amused by having to pretend to be a married father, he agrees to the scheme of hiring actors to play his wife and son. After some unsuccessful rehearsals with his hired family, Sam is about to give up all hope of landing the deal, when a 7-year-old girl suddenly enters his house.

This is Zoey Russell (Sarah Rosen Fruitman), a well-meaning and friendly young girl who constantly gets into trouble due to her energetic impulses. One of these impulses was running into Sam's house, which, according to Zoey, resembled her doll house. Zoey's mother, Kathleen (Roma Downey), is a single parent who struggles with combining parenthood with her job, coincidentally at Sam's factory. She had aspirations of becoming an artist, but settled for a lesser position when she married Jerry Russell (Kevin Hicks), who has since left her.

Kathleen is offered a large sum of money for her and Zoey to pose as Sam's loving family. She is not impressed with Sam, but agrees to take the job because she needs to save money for a down payment on a house, but also because Zoey is fond of Sam's house. They are given a make-over by Sam's staff and are taught what to say and what not to say to the potential client, Javier Del Campo (Héctor Elizondo). He is scheduled to stay at Sam's mansion for a weekend, during which he becomes fond of Zoey.

When Javier announces that he will stay until the negotiations are completed, for another two weeks, Zoey is delighted, unlike Sam and Kathleen. Sam is especially frustrated, because the family act has negative influence on his work. One evening, Zoey unintentionally messes up Sam's office, which causes him to have an angry outburst. Kathleen is appalled by his behavior toward her daughter and immediately quits and leaves the house. That evening, Sam comes to Kathleen's apartment, apologizes to her and convinces her to return. The next night, the 'family' and Javier go out ice skating, during which Zoey becomes convinced that Javier is an angel. Sam, meanwhile, realizes that he is more charmed with Kathleen than with an attractive young woman who was flirting with him earlier that evening.

Just when things are going for the upper, Jerry shows up where Sam, Dave and Javier are having lunch. He demands to know what is going on, and threatens to let Javier know and scuttle their negotiations. Sam, aware of his hustler lifestyle - even though Zoey thinks that he has left home to become an astronaut - offers him money to keep their secret, with the condition that he not contact his family until after Christmas. Shortly after, Kathleen learns that the possible deal between Sam and Javier includes a sale, not a merger as she thought, meaning that production will move to Mexico and will cost most of Sam's employees (including Kathleen) their jobs. In response, she shows Sam how much his employees need their job, which puts Sam in even a more difficult position. The same evening, the bonding continues over present wrapping and they are about to kiss but are interrupted by Zoey waking up from a nightmare.

On Christmas morning, Javier signs the contract, though Sam is not willing to, claiming he doesn't do business on Christmas. Instead, he kisses Kathleen under the mistletoe, which upsets Zoey. To worsen the matter, Jerry shows up, confusing Javier. Sam explains the entire situation, and Javier responds understandingly, even offering to honor the contract. Again, Sam refuses to sign it, choosing instead to save the factory employees' jobs. Jerry, meanwhile, prepares to leave, assuring Zoey that she is better off with Sam and Kathleen. Nevertheless, she is devastated and reacts by climbing up a tree to see her father leave. Sam and Kathleen follow her, and the branch Zoey is on breaks. She is hanging from a branch and is afraid she can't hang on much longer. Sam tells her that he loves her and assures her that he will catch her, which he does. At the end it is shown that Zoey accepted Sam as her new father.

== Cast ==
- Roma Downey as Kathleen Russell
- Eric McCormack as Sam Field
- Sarah Rosen Fruitman as Zoey Russell
- Héctor Elizondo as Javier Del Campo
- Shawn Alex Thompson as Dave Hebert
- Kevin Hicks as Jerry Russell
- Janet Bailey as Carly
- Barbara Gordon as Bridget

== Production ==
On May 26, 1997, Variety announced that Roma Downey was set to star alongside Eric McCormack and Héctor Elizondo in the film, which was set to shoot in summer-time Toronto.

== Reception ==
Borrowed Hearts aired to mixed reviews, but was one of CBS's most watched TV movies.

The critic for Variety was positive on the film, calling it "a highly watchable and highly shmaltzy holiday offering from CBS. The combination of Downey, angels and a slick production should leave a nice ratings gift under the Eye web's Christmas tree." [..] "What makes Borrowed Hearts fun is the snappy, shallow, engaging script and story by Pamela Wallace and Earl Wallace. Also, kudos to Thompson, who infuses Dave with enough cynicism to cut some of the sugar poured in the first hour. Unfortunately, by the second hour, the Wallaces start to really tug at those heartstrings, but by that time, you're hooked." The reviewer also praised the film's cast and crew: "Hunky McCormack limns Sam with an extremely light and humorous touch; when he's called on to emote, he successfully gives Sam depth. The lovely Downey and Elizondo don't have all that much to do, and young thesp Fruitman is fine. Production design by Rolf Harvey and costumes by Linda Muir hit the mark in evoking New England wealth. Ted Kotcheff's direction is snappy."

== See also ==
- List of Christmas films
