= Leif Garrett (album) =

Studio album by Leif Garrett
- Released: July 22, 1977
- Recorded: January – February 1977
- Studio: Atlantic Studios (New York City)
- Genres: Pop; rock
- Length: 25:40
- Label: Atlantic
- Producer: Michael Lloyd for Mike Curb Productions

Leif Garrett chronology
Leif Garrett (1977)	Feel the Need (1978)

Singles from Leif Garrett
- 1. "Surfin' USA" Released: August 1977; 2. "Runaround Sue" Released: October 1977; 3. "Put Your Head on My Shoulder" Released: February 1978; 4. "The Wanderer" Released: April 1978

Professional ratings
Review scores
Source	Rating
Allmusic	4/5 stars
Christgau's Record Guide	D

Leif Garrett is the debut studio album by American singer-actor Leif Garrett, released in 1977 by Atlantic Records. Garrett had recorded the album at Atlantic Studios while staying in New York City, and released the album at the age of 15.

== Track listing ==
No.	Title	Writer(s)	Length
1.	"The Wanderer"	Ernie Maresca	2:41
2.	"California Girls"	Mike Love, Brian Wilson	2:27
3.	"Put Your Head on My Shoulder"	Paul Anka	2:45
4.	"I Wanna Share a Dream With You"	Michael Lloyd	2:15
5.	"Johnny B. Goode"	Chuck Berry	2:32
6.	"Runaround Sue"	Dion DiMucci, Ernie Maresca	2:26
7.	"That's All"	Alan Brandt, Bob Haymes	3:01
8.	"Bad to Me"	John Lennon, Paul McCartney	2:49
9.	"Special Kind of Girl"	Roger Atkins, John D'Andrea, Michael Lloyd	2:34
10.	"Surfin' USA"	Chuck Berry, Brian Wilson	2:10

== Personnel ==
- Leif Garrett – vocals
- Jay Graydon – guitars
- Mitch Holder - guitars
- Art Munson - guitars
- Jim Hughart - bass guitar
- Greg Mathieson - keyboards
- Michael Lloyd - keyboards, backing vocals
- John D'Andrea – saxophone
- John Rosenberg - Horns
- Sid Sharp - strings
- Rick Schloßer - drums
- Ron Krasinski - drums
- Alan Estes - percussion
- Jim Haas - backing vocals
- Ron Hicklin - backing vocals
- Stan Farber - backing vocals
- Tom Bahler - backing vocals

Production

- Michael Lloyd – producer, mixing
- Humberto Gatica – engineer, mixing
- John D'Andrea – arranger
- John Rosenberg – director
- Sid Sharp – director

== Charts ==
=== Weekly charts ===
Chart (1977)	Peak position
US Top LPs (Billboard)	37
Australia (Kent Music Report)	2

=== Year-end charts ===
Chart (1978)	Peak position
Australia (Kent Music Report)	19

== Certifications ==
Region	Certification	Certified units/sales
Australia (ARIA)	Gold	20,000^{^}
^{^} Shipments figures based on certification alone.
