= James & Michael Younger =

- Also known as: The Younger Brothers
- Origin: Edinburg, Texas, U.S.
- Genres: Country
- Years active: 1982–1986
- Labels: MCA, Permian, AIR
- Past members: James Williams; Michael Williams

James & Michael Younger, also known as The Younger Brothers, were an American country music group from Edinburg, Texas composed of brothers James and Michael Williams.

== History ==
A part of the Williamses' earlier career was being the original artists on their pop recording, "When I Think of You," which was recorded as simply James & Michael and released in 1977. James wrote the song, which was made into a minor hit in 1979 with a cover by Leif Garrett.

Their eponymous debut album was released in 1983 by MCA Records. Its first single, "Nothing but the Radio On," reached the Top 20 on the Billboard Hot Country Singles chart in 1982. An uncredited review in The Philadelphia Inquirer gave the duo's album a two-star rating, praising their vocal harmonies but criticizing the lack of variety in tempo. After exiting MCA, the duo recorded a number of singles for the Permian and AIR labels, then disbanded in 1986.

== Discography ==
=== Albums ===
Year	Album	Label
1983	James & Michael Younger	MCA

=== Singles ===
Year	Single	Chart Positions		Album
Year	Single	US Country	CAN Country	Album
1982	"Lonely Hearts"	68	—	single only
1982	"Nothing but the Radio On"	19	—	James & Michael Younger
1982	"There's No Substitute for You"	48	—	James & Michael Younger
1983	"Somewhere Down the Line"	50	41	James & Michael Younger
1983	"A Taste of the Wind"	54	—	James & Michael Younger
1983	"Lovers on the Rebound"	48	—	James & Michael Younger
1983	"Shoot First, Ask Questions Later"	65	—	James & Michael Younger
1985	"My Special Angel"	82	—	singles only
1986	"Back on the Radio Again"	67	—	singles only
1986	"She Wants to Marry a Cowboy"	65	—	singles only
