= Petit Cheval =

Petit Cheval was a New Romantic rock group from South Africa. Their name is French for "little horse". The group was founded in Pretoria in 1982 by singer/songwriter Jon Selby and soon after recorded a demo, which landed them a deal with Warner Bros. Records in 1984. Their 1985 debut album was a great success in South Africa, but the increased publicity also led to internal disputes, and bassist Johan Griesel left the group shortly after the album's release. Adding bassist Chris Bekker, they released an EP in 1986; however, internal tensions led to a split in 1987. Craig Else is a sound engineer in Los Angeles and plays in Bay City Rollers. Johan Griesel went on to become a recording engineer; Danny de Wet later formed the band The Electric Petals the name was then later changed to Wonderboom, and Harold Shenk went on to do production work on the South African music scene. Francois du Plessis is now an avant-garde artist working in Germany. Jon Selby continues to do work as a songwriter, and currently resides in Israel with his wife and three children. The group's biggest hits on South African radio included Once in a Lifetime and It Was the Wind, a duet with Lesley Rae Dowling. ( The duet she recorded with Petit Cheval was not *It was the Wind* its called *Love is Knocking*)

== Members ==
- Jon Selby - guitar, vocals, songwriter
- Sheldon Thomas - keyboards
- Craig Else - guitar
- Johan Griesel - bass
- Danny de Wet - drums
- Francois du Plessis - drums (early member)
- Harold Shenk - keyboards (early member)
- Chris Bekker - bass (1986-1987)

== Discography ==
- The Voice of Reason (Warner Bros. Records, 1985)
- The Perfect Gift EP (Warner Bros. Records, 1986)
- Young Lions (compilation) (Tusk Records, 1994)
- Once in a Lifetime (RetroFresh, 2006)
