= Feel the Need (Leif Garrett album) =

Studio album by Leif Garrett
- Released: September 1978
- Recorded: 1978
- Genre: Pop
- Length: 30:39
- Label: Scotti Brothers
- Producer: Michael Lloyd for Mike Curb Productions

Leif Garrett chronology
Leif Garrett (1977)	Feel the Need (1978)	Same Goes for You (1979)

Singles from Feel the Need
- 1. "I Was Made for Dancin'"/"Living Without Your Love" Released: October 1978; 2. "Sheila"/"Fun, Fun, Fun" Released: January 1979; 3. "Feel the Need"/"New York City Nights" Released: May 1979; 4. "When I Think of You"/"New York City Nights" Released: August 1979

Professional ratings
Review scores
Source	Rating
Allmusic	3/5 stars

Feel the Need is the second studio album by American singer-actor Leif Garrett, released in 1978 by Scotti Brothers Records. The album peaked at number 34 on the Billboard 200 albums chart and spawned two hit singles: "I Was Made for Dancin'" (US No. 10) and "Feel the Need" (US No. 57).

== Track listing ==
No.	Title	Writer(s)	Length
1.	"I Was Made for Dancin'"	Michael Lloyd	3:17
2.	"Groovin'"	Eddie Brigati, Felix Cavaliere	2:59
3.	"Forget About You"	Andy McMaster	2:40
4.	"Once a Fool"	Dennis Lambert, Brian Potter	3:16
5.	"Fun, Fun, Fun"	Brian Wilson, Mike Love	2:06
6.	"Sheila"	Tommy Roe	3:21
7.	"When I Think of You"	James Lewis Williams	3:02
8.	"This Time"	Baker Knight, Dick Burns	3:24
9.	"Living Without Your Love"	John D'Andrea, Michael Lloyd	3:14
10.	"Feel the Need"	Abrim Tilmon	3:20

== Personnel ==
- John D'Andrea – arrangements
- Humberto Gatica – engineer
- Michael Lloyd – engineer
- David Larkham – art direction, design
- Barry Levine – photography

== Charts ==
Chart (1978)	Peak position
US Pop	34
Australia (Kent Music Report)	8

Singles

Year	Single	Chart	Position
1978	"I Was Made for Dancin'"	AUS	2
1978	"I Was Made for Dancin'"	UK	4
1978	"I Was Made for Dancin'"	US Pop	10
1978	"I Was Made for Dancin'"	GER	10
1978	"I Was Made for Dancin'"	JP	12
1978	"I Was Made for Dancin'"	US AC	38
1979	"Sheila"	AUS	63
1979	"Feel the Need"	UK	38
1979	"Feel the Need"	GER	43
1979	"Feel the Need"	US Pop	57
1979	"Feel the Need"	JP	72
1979	"Feel the Need"	AUS	97
1979	"When I Think of You"	US AC	11
1979	"When I Think of You"	US Pop	78

== Certifications ==
Region	Certification	Certified units/sales
Spain (Promusicae)	Gold	50,000^{^}
^{^} Shipments figures based on certification alone.
