= When I Think of You (Leif Garrett song) =

Single by Leif Garrett

from the album Feel the Need
- B-side: "New York City Nights"
- Released: August 1979
- Recorded: Mid 1978
- Genre: Pop
- Length: 3:02
- Label: Scotti Brothers
- Songwriter: James Williams
- Producer: Michael Lloyd

Leif Garrett singles chronology
"Feel the Need" (1979)	"When I Think of You" (1979)	"Memorize Your Number" (1979)

"When I Think of You" is a song written by James Williams and performed by Leif Garrett. It reached #11 on the US adult contemporary chart and #78 on the Billboard Hot 100 in 1979. The song was featured on his 1978 album, Feel the Need.

Garrett was a guest star in the season 3 first episode of the American television series Wonder Woman ("My Teen Idol is Missing"). The single was featured in the episode.

The song was produced by Michael Lloyd and arranged by John D'Andrea. Williams and his brother Michael, who later performed as James & Michael Younger, first recorded "When I Think of You" in 1977.

== "New York City Nights" ==
"New York City Nights" is the song on the B side of the "When I Think of You" single.

=== "Aishu Deito (New York City Nights)" ===
"Aishu Deito (New York City Nights)" (Japanese: 哀愁でいと) is a cover version, by Toshihiko Tahara, of the song "New York City Nights" by Leif Garrett. It reached number 1 on The Best Ten chart and number 2 on the Oricon Singles Chart in 1980, and sold more than 700,000 copies. The song was written by Yumiko Morioka.

== See also ==
- 1979 in music
