= Craig Else =

American musician (born 1964)

- Born: Craig David Else; October 12, 1964 (age 61); Victoria, British Columbia
- Genres: Rock, Classic rock, Pop music, Punk music
- Instruments: Guitar, vocals, drums, bass guitar, keyboards
- Years active: 1979–present
- Website: Official website

Craig Else (born October 12, 1964 in Victoria, British Columbia) is a guitarist, multi-instrumentalist, sound engineer, vocalist, and music producer.

== Career ==
=== 1970s and 1980s ===
In 1978 after years of music lessons given by his Grandmother, Craig discovered punk rock and formed his first band, Twisted Minds. He was influenced by The Clash, Alice Cooper and the Sex Pistols. Craig moved to South Africa in 1981 and played with Steve Fataar of The Flames and Ivy and the Creepers before joining Petit Cheval.

Petit Cheval enjoyed great success in the 1980s. They sold out tours to fan frenzy not seen since the days of Rabbitt. They released two albums, "The Voice of Reason" and "Perfect Gift" WEA along with seven singles and two compilation albums, "Young Lions" and "Once in a Lifetime". They had two number one singles, "It Was the Wind" and "Once in a Lifetime" and won the Sarie Award (South Africa's equivalent of a Grammy) for best new band.

After leaving Petit Cheval in 1987 he did session work and eventually moved to Los Angeles, California in 1999 to work on Geffen records recording artist Vincent Rocco's solo album co-produced by Steve Van Zandt. He then joined "Tribe After Tribe" featuring Robbi Robb of South African band "Asylum Kids" and Three Fish and appeared on the albums "Enchanted Entrance" and "Ra Hoor Khuit". In 1992 he joined Roadhouse and played five nights a week, five forty-five-minute sets a night for five years. During this time he played with D.H. Peligro from Dead Kennedys and appeared on the albums "Peligro", "Welcome to America" and "The Virus that Would Not Die" . He appeared on many other albums including Taylor Dayne's "Naked Without You" and Pure Sugar's eponymous debut album.

=== 1990s and 2000s ===
In 2000 Else joined Bay City Rollers and then in 2007 began touring with them as "The Original Idols" along with Leif Garrett, Barry Williams, The Cowsills, and Bo Donaldson and the Heywoods. They also appeared with the Family Stone, the Guess Who, and Nelson. Craig played with Leif Garrett for some shows and recorded Neil Young's "Old Man" with him. He left the Bay City Rollers in 2008.

Craig is currently working on solo projects and continues to produce music for a variety of projects.

== Equipment ==
Craig is the owner/operator of Or Else Productions and is a live sound engineer for Fox Television in Los Angeles.

Craig uses about ten guitars of varying types, notably a 7-string Ibanez uv777bk, a Veillette electric 12 string, a Gibson Les Paul, and a Yamaha Billy Sheehan "Attitude" bass, a gift from Billy Sheehan.

== Discography ==
- Petit Cheval "Once in a Lifetime"
- Petit Cheval "The Voice of Reason"
- Petit Cheval "A Perfect Gift"
- Petit Cheval "Young Lions"
- Petit Cheval "Sharp Cuts"
- Petit Cheval "Concert in the Park"
- Petit Cheval "Rocking Against the System"
- Petit Cheval "Best of SA Pop"
- Petit Cheval "Campus Classics"
- Petit Cheval "My Bleeding Heart"
- Taylor Dayne "Naked Without You"
- Sheila Nichols "Wake"
- Tribe After Tribe "Enchanted Entrance"
- Pure Sugar "Pure Sugar"
- Journey w/ Steve Farmer (Ted Nugent)
- Steve Olson "What About the Kids" Skateboarder Sessions
- Amritakripa "Dancing Lotus"
- Robbi Robb "Ra Hoor Khuit"
- Ian Mitchell (Bay City Rollers) "The Gift"
- Sex With Lurch "The Good, the Bad and the Lurchy"
- Sex With Lurch "Sex With Lurch"
- Sex With Lurch "Sex With Lurch 2"
- Sex With Lurch "Best of Sex With Lurch"
- Sex With Lurch "Sex With Lurch and the Barbarellatones"
- DH Peligro (Dead Kennedys) "Peligro"
- DH Peligro (Dead Kennedys) "Welcome to America"
- DH Peligro (Dead Kennedys) "The Virus that Would Not Die" (1984)
- Jeannie Ortega "No Place Like Brooklyn" (1990)
- Ivy and the Creepers "Ivy and the Creepers" (1993)
- "Jesse McCartney" (1995)

== Awards and nominations ==
- Sarie "Best Contemporary Pop Artist, Petit Cheval"
- Emmy "Laker's Riot"
- Golden Mic
