= A Secret Life (film) =

- Written by: Renee Longstreet
- Directed by: Larry Peerce
- Starring: Roma Downey; William Russ
- Music by: John D'Andrea; Cory Lerios
- Country of origin: United States
- Original language: English

Production
- Running time: 96 min
- Production companies: Carla Singer Productions; Hamdon Entertainment; Carlton America

Original release
- Network: Lifetime
- Release: December 1, 1999

A Secret Life (also known as The Test of Love) is a 1999 American drama film directed by Larry Peerce and starring Roma Downey and William Russ. Made for direct release to television by Lifetime Network, it was retitled in the United Kingdom as Breach of Trust.

== Plot summary ==
Mark and Cassie Whitman are a happily married couple. They are proud of their teenage son. They are obviously still in love at their twentieth anniversary party. Mark leaves to go on a business trip; the plane crashes and he is soon reported badly injured but alive. Listed as Mark's wife is a travelling companion of which Cassie knows nothing about. Her husband is in a coma in the hospital. Cassie did not know her husband had a mistress, nor did she know of his eight-year-old daughter Erica. Cassie sets out to find out the truth.

== Cast ==
- Roma Downey as Cassie Whitman
- William Russ as Mark Whitman
- Jed Millar as Kevin Whitman
- Jamie Rose as Judith Evans
- Penny Johnson Jerald as Hope
- Kristina Malota as Erica
