= I Was Made for Dancin' =

Single by Leif Garrett

from the album Feel the Need
- B-side: "Living Without Your Love"
- Released: October 1978 (US release); January 1979 (UK release)
- Recorded: 1978
- Genre: Pop, disco
- Length: 3:14
- Label: Scotti Brothers
- Songwriter: Michael Lloyd
- Producer: Michael Lloyd

Leif Garrett singles chronology
"The Wanderer" (1978)	"I Was Made for Dancin'" (1978)	"Sheila" (1979)

"I Was Made for Dancin'" is a song written by Michael Lloyd and performed by Leif Garrett. It reached #4 on the UK Singles Chart, #10 on the Billboard Hot 100, and #38 on the US adult contemporary chart. It also reached #2 in Australia, #10 in Germany, #13 in The Netherlands and #12 in Japan. The song, produced by Lloyd and arranged by John D'Andrea, was featured on his 1978 album, Feel the Need.

The single ranked #37 on the Billboard Year-End Hot 100 singles of 1979.

== Charts ==
=== Weekly charts ===
Chart (1978–1979)	Peak position
Australia (Kent Music Report)	2
Canada RPM Top Singles	12
Canada RPM Adult Contemporary	22
Germany	10
Ireland (IRMA)	5
Japan	12
New Zealand	3
Spain (AFE)	1
UK	4
US Billboard Hot 100	10
US Billboard Adult Contemporary	38
US Cash Box Top 100	15

=== Year-end charts ===
Chart (1979)	Rank
Australia (Kent Music Report)	34
Canada	86
UK	68
US Billboard Hot 100	37

== Certifications ==
Certifications and sales for "I Was Made for Dancin'"
Region	Certification	Certified units/sales
Japan (RIAJ)	10× Gold	500,000^{^}
United Kingdom (BPI)	Silver	250,000^{^}
^{^} Shipments figures based on certification alone.

== In popular culture ==
- Garrett sang the song on the 1978 episode "My Teenage Idol is Missing" on the TV show Wonder Woman.
- Carol Burnett sings a version of this song when she was the guest on a 1981 episode of The Muppet Show.
- Garrett's version was featured in the 2001 film Joe Dirt.
