= Healing Angel =

Studio album by Roma Downey
- Released: September 14, 1999
- Genre: New-age
- Length: 52:08
- Label: RCA
- Producer: Phil Coulter

Professional ratings
Review scores
Source	Rating
Allmusic	link

Healing Angel is the first (and thus far, only) recording released by Irish actress and Touched by an Angel star Roma Downey. It was issued in 1999 on RCA Records. The album features Downey reading ancient Celtic texts, while Phil Coulter (who also produced the record), plays the music. It peaked very high on the New Age chart, reaching number 5. To date, it has sold in excess of 42,000 copies. The album contains vocals from the Irish folk singer Aoife Ní Fhearraigh.

== Track listing ==
- All songs written by Phil Coulter, except where noted.
1. Be Thou My Vision (trad.; arr. Coulter)(feat. Aoife Ní Fhearraigh) - 4:24
2. Loving - 3:12
3. In Perfect Harmony - 3:41
4. The Old Man - 3:39
5. Peace & Healing - 3:28
6. My Little Angel - 3:08
7. Walk On Ancient Ground - 3:16
8. A Simple Prayer (Coulter, Francis of Assisi) - 2:46
9. Longing - 3:30
10. Suffer Little Children - 3:28
11. Til Death Do Us Part - 4:22
12. Sunlight on the Water (instrumental) - 3:07
13. I Am the Wind - 3:22
14. Gold & Silver Days (Coulter, Sean O'Riada) - 3:04
15. An Irish Blessing (feat. Aoife Ní Fhearraigh) - 3:55

=== Chart performance (Healing Angel) ===
Chart (1999)	Peak position
U.S. Billboard New Age Albums	6

== Production ==
- Executive Producer: Steve Gates
- Produced By Phil Coulter
- Engineers: Tony Harris
- Assistant Engineers: Aaron Gant, Frances Murphy, Dave Slevin
- Mastering: Ray Staff

== Personnel ==
- Roma Downey: Spoken Word & Narration
- Brian Kennedy, Reilly: Additional Vocals
- Phil Coulter: Keyboards, Synthesizers, Piano, Multi-Instruments
- Malachy Robinson, Liam Wylie: Bass
- Lloyd Byrne: Percussion
- Brendan Monaghan: Uilleann Pipes
- Brona Cahill, Diana Daly, Frank Gallagher (also viola & whistles), Donagh Keough, Gloria Mulhall, Kate O'Conner, Ken Rice, Louis Roden, Anita Vedres, Gillian Williams: Violin
- Emily Hazelhurst, Nicholas Milne, Joachim Roewer, Rachel Walker: Viola
- Donagh Collins, Alison Hood, Arun Rao: Cello
- Catherine Mary Clancy: Harp
- Arranged By Phil Coulter & Dave Gold
