= Michael Scott (American musician) =

American musician and actor (born 1968)

Michael V. Scott (born 1968) is an American musician and actor (bass and vocals) who played in the band Godspeed with former teen idol Leif Garrett. He was also in the Industrial Metal band Deadtime Stories (bass, lead vocals) and The Distortions (bass). In addition to music, he had a brief acting career in the early 1990s, and has appeared on The Rosie O'Donnell Show, VH1's Behind The Music, and A & E Biography.
