= 8-Track Flashback =

- Starring: Luis Cardenas; David Cassidy; Tony De La Rosa; Leif Garrett; Kenny Marquez; Suzanne Somers
- Country of origin: United States
- No. of seasons: 4

Production
- Running time: 30 min.

Original release
- Network: VH1
- Release: September 23, 1995 – 1998

8-Track Flashback (also titled VH1's 8-Track Flashback) is a television series hosted by David Cassidy, Leif Garrett, and Suzanne Somers. This rhyming title refers to the fact that it is a "flashback" to the popularity of 8-tracks in the 1970s. The show aired on VH1 from September 23, 1995 to 1998.

A compilation CD, 8-Track Flashback: The One-Hit Wonders, was released in 1997 highlighting some of the songs featured on the series.
