= Amy Burkhard Evans =

American actress and musical director

- Occupation(s): Television, music director, actress

Amy Burkhard Evans is an American actress and musical director. She has worked on Days of Our Lives, as a musical director for two episodes, in 1999 and 2007, and as an actress playing minor character Amy from 1989–1990.

== Awards and nominations ==
- Won, 1990, Outstanding Achievement in Music Direction and Composition for a Drama Series for: "Days of Our Lives" (shared with Marty Davich and Ken Corday)
- Won, 1997, Outstanding Music Direction and Composition for a Drama Series for: "Days of our Lives" (shared with Ken Corday, Brent Nelson, Dominic Messinger, Cory Lerios, John D'Andrea, and Stephen Reinhardt)
- Nominated, 2006, Outstanding Achievement in Music Direction and Composition for a Drama Series for: "Days of our Lives" (shared with Stephen Reinhardt, Ken Corday, and Brent Nelson)
- Nominated, 2007, Outstanding Achievement in Music Direction and Composition for a Drama Series for: "Days of our Lives" (shared with Stephen Reinhardt, Ken Corday, and D. Brent Nelson)
