= Leif Garrett =

American actor and singer (born 1961)

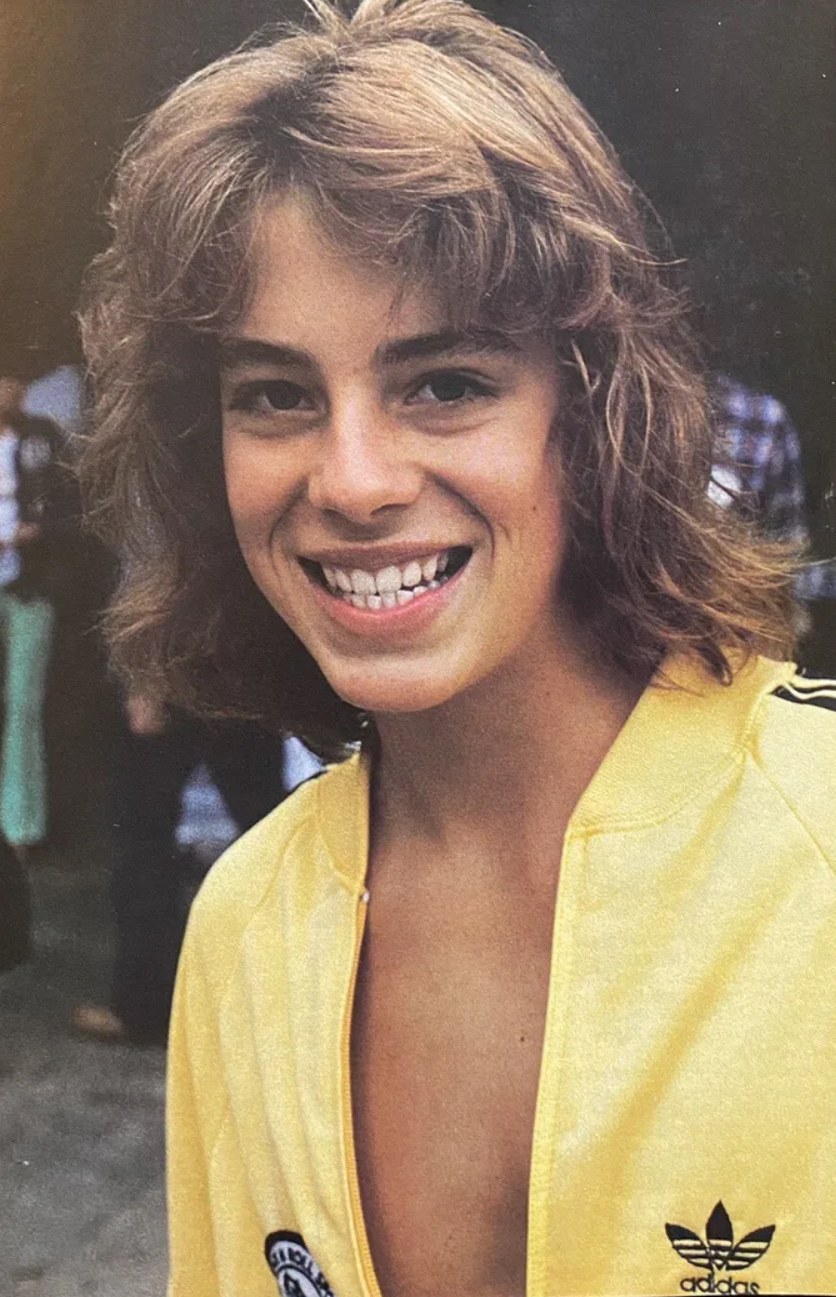
- Garrett in 1978

Background information
- Born: Leif Per Nervik; November 8, 1961 (age 65); Hollywood, California, U.S.
- Genres: Bubblegum; teen pop
- Occupations: Actor; singer; television personality
- Instruments: Vocals; guitar
- Years active: 1968–present
- Labels: 20th Century; Atlantic; Scotti Brothers; Tongue and Groove; Cleopatra; Golden Lane
- Website: leifgarrett.net

Leif Garrett (born Leif Per Nervik; November 8, 1961) is an American actor, singer, and television personality, who was a teen idol in the 1970s. He later received much publicity for his drug abuse and legal troubles.

== Early life ==
Garrett was born in Hollywood, California, to Rik Nervik and actress Carolyn Stellar, and started his entertainment career at age five. His father was absent for most of his life. He graduated from high school aged 15.

== Career ==
=== Acting career ===
Garrett and his sister Dawn Lyn worked a variety of acting jobs. They co-starred in the horror movie Devil Times Five as juvenile mental patients who go on a murder spree at an isolated ski resort. Dawn and Leif also guest-starred in an episode of Gunsmoke as well as Wonder Woman.

Garrett's more notable performances include the breakthrough role of Jimmy Henderson in Bob & Carol & Ted & Alice (1969), the protagonist's son Mike Pusser from the Walking Tall movies (1973, 1975, 1977), and the recurring role of Zack Russell on the ABC TV series Family. He also played the role of Leonard Unger, the son of Felix Unger (Tony Randall), on the ABC series The Odd Couple, a part that had been previously played by Willie Aames.

In late 1975, Garrett appeared in the role of Endy Karras in a 12-week CBS drama series Three for the Road. Garrett's appearance in the program triggered a response from teenage girls and led to his first appearances in teenage magazines, such as Tiger Beat. Garrett also played alongside Lee Van Cleef in two Spaghetti Westerns shot mainly in Israel: Kid Vengeance and God's Gun. He played the title role in the television film Peter Lundy and the Medicine Hat Stallion and also starred in the film Skateboard.

He appeared as Bob Sheldon in Francis Ford Coppola's 1983 cinematic adaptation of S. E. Hinton's novel, The Outsiders. In 1985, he starred in Thunder Alley as the lead singer of a pop band that is torn apart by drugs, and in Shaker Run as a mechanic. Other notable Garrett movies from the decade include Delta Fever and the horror film Cheerleader Camp. He played a deranged murderer who was in love with his sister in Party Line.

=== Music career ===
In late 1976, Garrett signed a five-album recording contract with Atlantic Records. In early 1977, he released a single called "Come Back When You Grow Up", and recorded his first album, Leif Garrett. The album was released in July 1977, and his first four singles charted modestly on the US Billboard Hot 100. All of these hits were covers of late 1950s and early 1960s hits such as the Dion covers "Runaround Sue" and "The Wanderer". In mid-1978, he signed with Scotti Brothers Records and recorded his second album, Feel the Need. Its first single, "I Was Made for Dancin'", reached number 10 on the US Hot 100 and number 4 on the UK Singles Chart early in 1979. It became his greatest hit in the US and the UK.

Subsequent singles failed to crack the Top 20 in either country, but he continued to record, releasing the albums Same Goes for You (1979), Can't Explain (1980) and My Movie of You (1981) in quick succession. In May 1979, he hosted a TV special, Leif, with guest stars Brooke Shields, Marie Osmond, Bob Hope and Flip Wilson.

In 1981, Garrett recorded "I Am a Rebel", words and music expressly composed for him by Victorio Pezzolla and produced by Richard Finch of KC and the Sunshine Band, which became the theme song for an Italian TV program entitled Il Barattolo. He mostly stopped recording music in the early 1980s and concentrated on acting for the rest of the decade. He later claimed the producers would not allow him to make music aimed at an adult audience when he reached his early twenties. In 1986, he provided lead vocals to the song "The Way to Happiness", and backing vocals to the title track of the L. Ron Hubbard album The Road to Freedom.

=== 1990–2005 ===
In the mid-1990s, Garrett returned to acting and singing, appearing in the 1995 low-budget horror film Dominion, touring with the Melvins and recording vocals for their cover of "Smells Like Teen Spirit" on The Crybaby (2000). In 1998, a greatest hits compilation, The Leif Garrett Collection, was released. Garrett, however, has stated: "My former record label was bought out. The label was started by me […] meaning my music started it, funded it. And then it was bought out by some company that released the Greatest Hits Collection. Not only have I not seen any royalties from that, but they wanted me to promote it—‌the compensation being a couple of CDs."

In the late 1990s, Garrett hosted the series 8-Track Flashback on the cable music channel VH-1, replacing fellow teen idol David Cassidy. VH-1 went on to feature Garrett in a 1999 episode of its Behind the Music series.

In 1999, he formed the band Godspeed with Christopher Wade Damerst and Michael Scott (the Distortions, Deadtime Stories). They recorded a three-song EP on Garrett's own label, Tongue and Groove Records.

Garrett's stage work includes playing the title role in Joseph and the Amazing Technicolor Dreamcoat and, in late 2000, appearing in the National Theatre of the Deaf's production of A Child's Christmas in Wales. He also appeared in summer stock at The Barn Theatre's production of Old Timer in 2001. In the same year, he voiced himself in the animated television series Family Guy episode "The Thin White Line".

In 2003, Garrett appeared as himself in the David Spade film Dickie Roberts: Former Child Star. He co-wrote and sang "Former Child Star" for the film's soundtrack and was one of the singers of "Child Stars on Your Television", which played over the ending credits. He appeared with Aaron Carter in the 2005 film Popstar.

=== 2006–present ===
In September 2006, Garrett appeared on the celebrity edition of Fear Factor. He won the grand prize of $50,000. On New Year's Eve 2006, Garrett first appeared in Las Vegas with retro act Original Idols Live!, hosted by Barry Williams. The show also featured the Bay City Rollers, Bo Donaldson and the Heywoods, and the Cowsills, with selected appearances by Merrill Osmond, Tony DeFranco, and Danny Bonaduce.

In August 2007, Country Music Television (CMT) cast Garrett in the short-lived Ty Murray's Celebrity Bull Riding Challenge, among nine celebrities appearing on the show. However, he quit after one episode, citing soreness and lack of desire to continue.

In November 2007, Garrett released the album Three Sides of..., which constituted songs he recorded with his current band F8 and his 1990s band Godspeed as well as some new songs.

In 2008, the producers of TruTV's World's Dumbest... added Garrett to their cast, which features comedic commentary from celebrities like Garrett who have had brushes with the law. Garrett has frequently spoofed his troubled past and participates in a wide variety of sketches and skits written specially for him by the show's producers. In a 2010 episode, Garrett reenacted his recent arrest with two actors, including Todd Bridges, another show regular, portraying police officers.

Garrett toured South Korea in May 2010, with shows in Seoul and Busan. This marked the 30th anniversary of Garrett's first performance in Korea since June 1980. He embarked on another tour of the country in 2013.

Garrett was a cast member in the fourth season of Celebrity Rehab with Dr. Drew, which documented Garrett's struggle with addiction to heroin. The season premiered December 1, 2010. Garrett's sister, Dawn Lyn, and mother, Carolyn Stellar (November 6, 1934 – September 2, 2022), who was battling Stage 4 lung cancer, both appeared in Episode 7, which was filmed during Family Day, when the recovering addicts were visited by their loved ones to discuss how their addiction affected their family relationship.

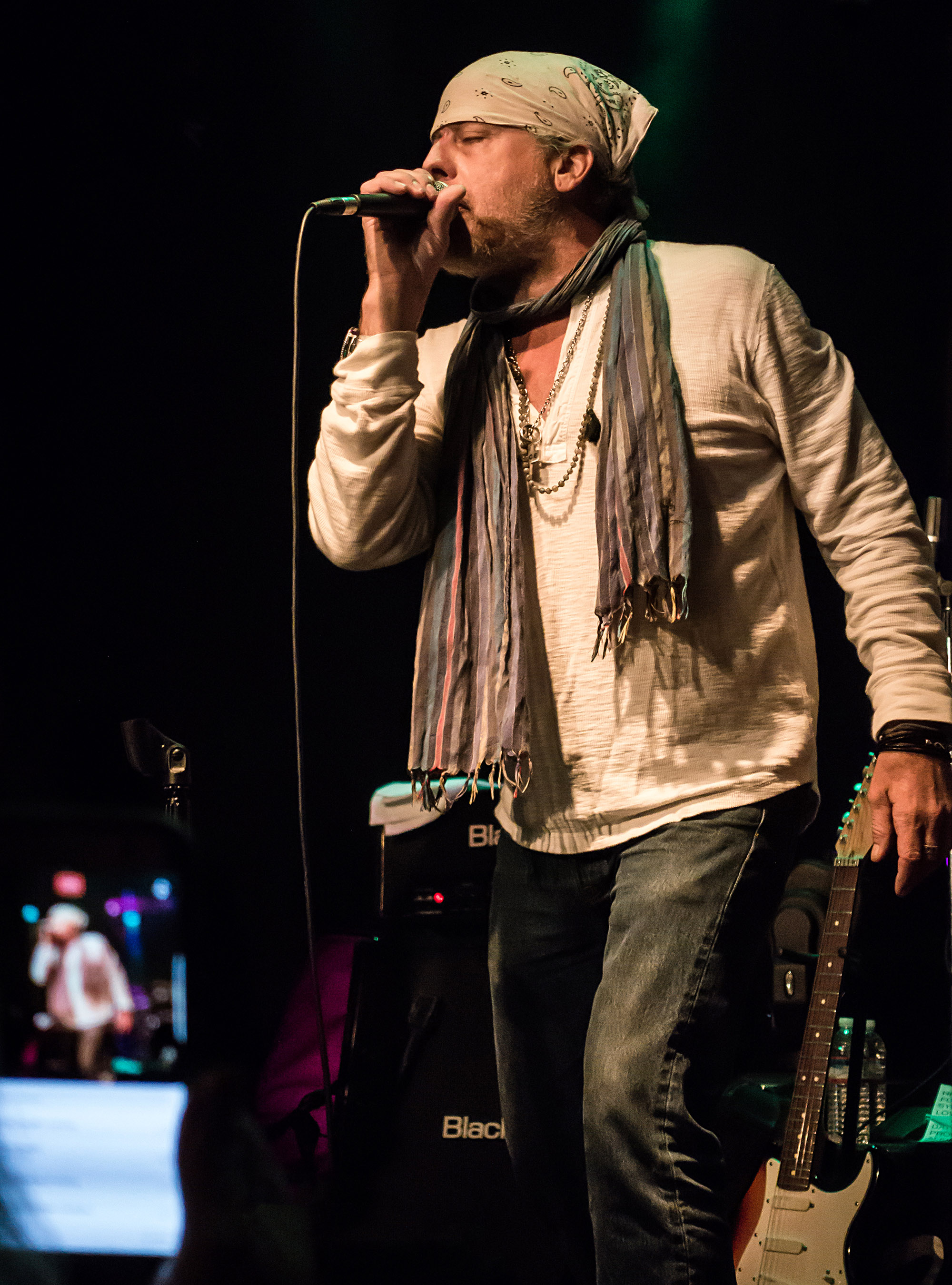
Garrett performing in 2016

In the early 2010s, Garrett began collaborating with punk rock artist and songwriter Craig Else. He released two singles on the Internet, sharing Else's credits, "Everything" (released in 2010) and "Help You, Make You" (released in 2012). The two also recorded a cover of Neil Young's "Old Man".

In 2019, Garrett published an autobiography entitled Idol Truth. In the biography and related interviews, Garrett explained that in multiple tracks in his earlier albums, Jim Haas actually replaced his vocals entirely. The producers had wanted him to "smooth" Garrett's uneven vocals, but made the choice sometimes to replace Garrett entirely on his own albums. In some cases, Garrett's producers even brought in Haas to sing for Garrett behind a curtain during some live concert tour performances.

== Personal life ==
Garrett and actress Nicollette Sheridan dated on and off for five years until 1985. Garrett also dated celebrities such as his former Family co-star Kristy McNichol, Tatum O'Neal, and Justine Bateman. In the 1990s, he was in a long-term relationship with actress Elaine Bilstad, who died in 1999 of a heart ailment.

In October 2001, Garrett was in a personal bankruptcy proceeding in a federal court in Los Angeles. Court papers stated his only regular income was a $1,000 monthly gift from his mother. His only listed possessions were his clothes, some household goods and about $350 in cash. Garrett had accumulated a $76,198 debt in unpaid credit card bills over a four-year period.

=== Legal troubles ===
Garrett admitted that he started using drugs when he was 14. On November 3, 1979, five days before his 18th birthday, he crashed a Porsche 914 that was being leased to his mother after a midnight party while he was driving to buy more cocaine. His blood alcohol level was three times the legal limit of that time and place, and he was high on quaaludes. The accident left his passenger and friend, Roland Winkler, a paraplegic. Garrett had only met Winkler about a month earlier. Neither Garrett nor Winkler was wearing a seatbelt. Garrett was later tried as a juvenile on drunk-driving charges; his driver's license was suspended for a year and he was placed on a year's probation. Winkler sued in January 1980, claiming Garrett was at fault in the accident.

In December 1984, Los Angeles Superior Court ordered Garrett's insurers, Transamerica Insurance Co., to pay US$3.9 million (equivalent to $9.9 million in 2025) to Winkler. Jurors assessed total damages in the civil negligence case at $4,215,500, but subtracted 8% of that amount, or $337,240, on the grounds that Winkler contributed to his own injuries by agreeing to ride in a car with a driver who he knew was drunk. Both Garrett and Winkler admitted in court that they were drunk and had taken depressant drugs; the court heard they had each taken equal amounts of alcohol and drugs that night. The panel ordered Garrett to pay $15,000 in punitive damages, which was not diminished by Winkler's partial responsibility. Winkler's attorney, Edward Steinbrecher, attributed the relatively small punitive damage award to Garrett's testimony that his net worth was only $50,000 to $100,000. In 1987, Winkler settled for $6 million (equivalent to $14.6 million in 2025) with the Premier Insurance Co., which had insured the firm leasing the Porsche to Garrett's mother. Garrett and Winkler were reunited in 1999 for an episode of Behind the Music, where Garrett was relieved to learn that Winkler had no bad feelings towards him and even said that Garrett's actions following the accident had actually saved his life.

Garrett was arrested for possession of cocaine in 1997.

On June 29, 1999, Los Angeles police arrested Garrett in the MacArthur Park area after he allegedly tried to buy heroin and cocaine from undercover officers. In March 2001, a Los Angeles judge issued a warrant for his arrest when he failed to attend court for a progress report required by his 1999 conviction. Two days later, the judge lifted the warrant and dropped the 1999 charges after Garrett submitted evidence that he had completed a rehab program.

In 2004, Garrett was arrested for possession of cocaine. He pled guilty in March 2005 to attempted possession of cocaine-based narcotics and was placed on probation. When he failed to appear in court in December 2005 for a status report, a warrant was issued for his arrest.

On January 14, 2006, when Garrett was arrested on a Los Angeles Metro Rail platform for not having a ticket, police found heroin in his possession. Because of the outstanding warrant for violating probation in a cocaine-related arrest, he was held without bail. He agreed to join a strict drug-diversion program, and his release from jail was ordered.

Garrett dropped out of the rehabilitation program and was taken into custody again on March 30, 2006 after a Superior Court commissioner determined he failed several drug tests while staying in a live-in drug diversion program. Garrett acknowledged he needed more help. On May 11, 2006, after failing to complete court-ordered drug rehabilitation, he was sentenced to 90 days in jail and three years' probation. He was given credit for the jail time he had already served since March 30, 2006.

On February 1, 2010, Garrett was arrested again for possession of narcotics. After denying having any drugs in his possession, he finally admitted to police that he had black tar heroin in his shoe. He posted $10,000 bail and was charged with a felony count of heroin possession. On October 18, 2010, he pled no contest to heroin possession in Los Angeles and entered a court-ordered rehabilitation program.

== Discography ==
=== Albums ===
Year	Album	Peak chart positions		Record label
Year	Album	US	AUS	Record label
1977	Leif Garrett	37	2	Atlantic Records
1978	Feel the Need	34	8	Scotti Brothers Records
1979	Same Goes for You	129	—	Scotti Brothers Records
1980	Can't Explain	—	—	Scotti Brothers Records
1981	My Movie of You	185	—	Scotti Brothers Records
1998	The Leif Garrett Collection	—	—	Rock 'n Roll Records
2003	F8	—	—	
2007	Three Sides of...	—	—	Cleopatra Records

=== Singles ===
Year	Title	Peak chart positions							Record label	B-side	Album
Year	Title	US	US AC	AUS	CAN	UK	JPN	GER	Record label	B-side	Album
1977	"Come Back When You Grow Up"	—	—	—	—	—	—	—	20th Century; Records	"Young World"	
1977	"Surfin' USA"	20	—	2	32	—	—	6	Atlantic; Records	"Special Kind of Girl"	Leif Garrett
1977	"Runaround Sue"	13	48	8	15	—	—	19	Atlantic; Records	"I Wanna Share a Dream with You"	Leif Garrett
1978	"Put Your Head on My Shoulder"	58	—	24	—	—	—	—	Atlantic; Records	"Kari"	Leif Garrett
1978	"The Wanderer"	49	—	—	58	—	—	—	Atlantic; Records	"Love on the Run"	Leif Garrett
1978	"I Was Made for Dancin'"	10	38	2	12	4	12	10	Scotti Brothers; Records	"Living Without Your Love"	Feel the Need
1979	"Sheila"	—	—	63	—	—	—	—	Scotti Brothers; Records	"Fun, Fun, Fun"	Feel the Need
1979	"Feel the Need"	57	—	97	—	38	72	43	Scotti Brothers; Records	"New York City Nights"	Feel the Need
1979	"When I Think of You"	78	11	—	—	—	—	—	Scotti Brothers; Records	"New York City Nights"	Feel the Need
1979	"Memorize Your Number"	60	—	—	—	—	—	—	Scotti Brothers; Records	"Moonlight Dancin'"	Same Goes for You
1980	"I Was Looking for Someone to Love"	78	—	—	—	—	—	—	Scotti Brothers; Records	"Little Things You Do"	Same Goes for You
1980	"You Had to Go and Change on Me"	—	—	—	—	—	—	—	Scotti Brothers; Records	"Roweena"	Can't Explain
1980	"New York City Nights"	—	—	—	—	—	56	—	Scotti Brothers; Records	"I Was Made For Dancin'"	
1981	"Uptown Girl"	—	—	—	—	—	—	74	Scotti Brothers; Records	"Just Like a Brother"	My Movie of You
1981	"Runaway Rita"	84	—	—	—	—	—	—	Scotti Brothers; Records	"Just Like a Brother"	My Movie of You

=== Other recording appearances ===
Garrett has also sung on releases by the Melvins (The Crybaby), the Crush Ups ("Betty Ford for X-Mas") and Liberty n' Justice ("Sight Unseen" on Soundtrack of a Soul), among others.

== Filmography ==
- Bob & Carol & Ted & Alice (1969)
- Walking Tall (1973)
- Peopletoys (Devil Times Five) (1974)
- Macon County Line (1974)
- Walking Tall Part 2 (1975)
- God's Gun (1976)
- Paper Tigers (1977)
- Kid Vengeance (1977)
- Walking Tall: Final Chapter (1977)
- Peter Lundy and the Medicine Hat Stallion (1977)
- Skateboard (1978)
- Sgt. Pepper's Lonely Hearts Club Band (1978)
- Longshot (1981)
- The Outsiders (1983)
- Shaker Run (1985)
- Thunder Alley (1985)
- Delta Fever (1987)
- Cheerleader Camp (1987)
- Party Line (1988)
- The Banker (1989)
- The Spirit of '76 (1990)
- Dominion (1995)
- The Whispering (1996)
- The Next Tenant (1998)
- I Woke Up Early the Day I Died (1998)
- The Art of a Bullet (1999)
- Dickie Roberts: Former Child Star (2003)
- Popstar (2005)
- Circumstances of Fate (2006)
- Fish Mich (2009)

== Television work ==
- Nanny and the Professor ("The Human Element") (1970)
- Black Noon (1971)
- Cannon ("Death Is a Double-Cross") (1971)
- Family Affair ("Heroes Are Born") (1971)
- The F.B.I. ("The Deadly Species") (1972 season 7 episode 24)
- Circle of Fear (1973)
- Strange Homecoming (1974)
- The Odd Couple ("The Frog") (1974)
- The Last Survivors (1975)
- Three for the Road (1975)
- Flood! (1976)
- Peter Lundy and the Medicine Hat Stallion (1977)
- The Hanna-Barbera Happy Hour (1978)
- Family (1978)
- Wonder Woman ("My Teenage Idol is Missing") (1978 season 3 episode 1)
- CHiPs (two-part episode "Roller Disco") (1979)
- Superboy ("Bringing Down The House") (1988)
- VH1's 8-Track Flashback (1995–1996)
- Behind the Music (1999)
- Family Guy ("The Thin White Line") (2001)
- The Weakest Link (2001)
- American Black Beauty (2005)
- Celebrity Fear Factor (2005)
- Ty Murray's Celebrity Bull Riding Challenge (2007)
- World's Dumbest... (2008–2013)
- Celebrity Rehab with Dr. Drew (2010)
- Behind the Music Remastered (2010)
- Behind the Music (2022)

== Bibliography ==
- Garrett, Leif and Epting, Chris (2019). Idol Truth: A Memoir. Post Hill Press.
- Holmstrom, John (1996). The Moving Picture Boy: An International Encyclopaedia from 1895 to 1995. Norwich: Michael Russell. p. 338.
