= John D'Andrea =

American composer

- Occupations: Television, composer, arranger, music writer

John D'Andrea is an American television composer, arranger and music writer.

== Biography ==
D'Andrea, as a boy, was interested in being a musician, due to his father's career playing the saxophone in local New Jersey bands, because of this, his father gave him a saxophone for his ninth birthday. Years later, D'Andrea attended the Arts High School for music and the Manhattan School of Music in New York. At the same time he, like his father, participated in local New Jersey bands, as a player, singer, and arranger.

D'Andrea met Bob Marcucci in 1963. Marcucci secured a recording contract for him as a singer with Sinatra's label Reprise Records, which caused him to become a regular on the 1960s network hit music show Shindig. After this, he became a musical director, and accompanied artists such as The Beach Boys, Paul Revere, The Raiders, Vic Damone, Steve and Eydie, Eddie Rabbitt and Sylvie Vartan around the world.

He has arranged/produced 25 Gold and Platinum Records and 70 chart hits including such No. 1 hits as "Indian Reservation" by Paul Revere & the Raiders, "Da Doo Ron Ron" by Shaun Cassidy, "Can You Read My Mind" (Superman Theme) by Maureen McGovern, "Somewhere in Time" by Roger Williams, and "(I've Had) The Time of My Life" by Bill Medley and Jennifer Warnes. He won a Grammy Award for his arrangement of "Time of My Life".

D'Andrea is a member of the American Society of Composers, Authors and Publishers (ASCAP), from which he has garnered three awards. In his spare time, D'Andrea plays the saxophone for the D'Anbino Family Band.

== Credits ==
=== Composer ===
- Bionicle: The Legend Reborn (2009)
- Murder in the Mirror (2000)
- The Test of Love (1999)
- Diagnosis murder (1998–1999)
- A Secret Life (1999)
- A Marriage of Convenience (1998)
- Martial Law (1999–2000)
- Baywatch: White Thunder at Glacier Bay (1998)
- Assault on Devil's Island (1997)
- Steel Chariots (1997)
- In the Line of Duty: Blaze of Glory (1997)
- Gone in a Heartbeat (1996)
- Fall into Darkness (1996)
- Angel Flight Down (1996)
- Baywatch (1989–2001)
- Baywatch Nights (1995)
- Baywatch: Forbidden Paradise (1995)
- Mighty Max (1993–1994)
- Deadly Vows (1994)
- Thunder in Paradise (1993)
- The Tower (1993)
- Boiling Point (1993)
- Beyond the Law (1992)
- The Entertainers (1991)
- Child's Play 3 (1991)
- Swimsuit (1989)
- The Iron Triangle (1989)
- Dangerous Curves (1988)
- Hunter's Blood (1987)
- Body Slam (1986)
- The Education of Allison Tate (1986)
- Savage Streets (1984)
- Grambling's White Tiger (1981)
- Stranger in Our House (1978)
- Love's Dark Ride (1978)
- The Commitment (1976)
- Grey Knight (1993)
- Tough Enough (1983)
- America's Top 10 (1980)

=== Music writer ===
- Adam & Steve (2005)
- Dirty Dancing: Havana Nights (2004)
- Spy Game (2001)
- Dirty Dancing (1987)

=== Arranger ===
- Land of the Lost (1975)

== Awards and nominations ==
Daytime Emmy awards:

- Won, 1997, Outstanding Music Direction and Composition for a Drama Series for: "Days of Our Lives" (shared with Ken Corday, Brent Nelson, Dominic Messinger, Cory Lerios, Amy Burkhard Evans, and Stephen Reinhardt)
- ASCAP awards:
- Won, 1996, Top TV Series for "Baywatch"
- Won, 1997, Top TV Series for "Baywatch"
- Won, 1997, Most Performed Underscore
