= The Ronettes discography =

- Studio albums: 1
- Compilation albums: 11
- Singles: 15
- Other albums: 8

This article is a discography for American singing group The Ronettes. The Ronettes began recording with Colpix Records in 1961 and recorded eleven songs for Colpix. In March 1963, the group moved to Phil Spector's Philles Records, where they achieved their biggest success.

== Albums ==
=== Studio albums ===
Title	Album details	Peak chart positions
Title	Album details	US
Presenting the Fabulous Ronettes	Released: 1964; Label: Philles	96

=== Compilation albums ===
Title	Album details	Peak chart positions	
Title	Album details	US	US R&B
Philles Records Presents Today's Hits (with various artists)	Released: 1963; Label: Philles	—	—
A Christmas Gift for You from Phil Spector (with various artists)	Released: 1963; Label: Philles	5	2
The Ronettes Featuring Veronica	Released: 1965; Label: Colpix	—	—
The Best of the Ronettes	Released: 1992; Label: Phil Spector/ABKCO	—	91
Be My Baby: The Very Best of the Ronettes	Released: 2011; Label: Phil Spector/Legacy	—	—
Everything You Wanted to Know About the Ronettes ...But Were Afraid to Ask	Released: 2017; Label: For Collectors Only	—	—
Stereo Singles Collection	Released: 2024; Label: Select-O-Hits	—	—
"—" denotes a recording that did not chart or was not released.

== Singles ==
Title	Year	Peak chart positions									Certifications	Album
Title	Year	US	US R&B	BEL (FL)	BEL (WA)	CAN CHUM /RPM	FRA	GER	NOR	UK	Certifications	Album
"I Want a Boy" "Sweet Sixteen"	1961	—	—	—	—	—	—	—	—	—		The Ronettes Featuring Veronica
"I'm Gonna Quit While I'm Ahead" "I'm on the Wagon" or "My Guiding Angel"	1962	—	—	—	—	—	—	—	—	—		The Ronettes Featuring Veronica
"Silhouettes" "You Bet I Would"	1962	—	—	—	—	—	—	—	—	—		The Ronettes Featuring Veronica
"Good Girls" "Memory"	1962	—	—	—	—	—	—	—	—	—		The Ronettes Featuring Veronica
"Be My Baby" "Tedesco & Pitman" (Non-album track)	1963	2	4	4	15	2	193	60	9	4	BPI: 2× Platinum; BVMI: Gold; FIMI: Gold; RMNZ: 2× Platinum	Presenting the Fabulous Ronettes Featuring Veronica
"Baby, I Love You" "Miss Joan & Mr Sam" (Non-album track)	1963	24	6	—	—	—	—	—	—	11		Presenting the Fabulous Ronettes Featuring Veronica
"(The Best Part of) Breakin' Up" "Big Red" (Non-album track)	1964	39	—	—	—	—	—	—	—	43		Presenting the Fabulous Ronettes Featuring Veronica
"Do I Love You?" "Bebe & Susu" (Non-album track)	1964	34	11	—	—	14	—	—	—	35		Presenting the Fabulous Ronettes Featuring Veronica
"Walking in the Rain" "How Does it Feel?"	1964	23	3	—	—	16	—	—	—	—		Presenting the Fabulous Ronettes Featuring Veronica
"Born to Be Together" "Blues for Baby"	1965	52	—	—	—	29	—	—	—	—		Non-album tracks
"Is This What I Get for Loving You?" "Oh, I Love You"	1965	75	—	—	—	—	—	—	—	—		Non-album tracks
"I Can Hear Music" "When I Saw You" (from Presenting the Fabulous Ronettes)	1966	100	—	—	—	—	—	—	—	—		Non-album tracks
"You Came, You Saw, You Conquered" "Oh, I Love You"	1969	—	—	—	—	73	—	—	—	—		Non-album tracks
"Lover Lover" "Go Out and Get It"	1973	—	—	—	—	—	—	—	—	—		Non-album tracks
"I Wish I Never Saw the Sunshine" "I Wonder What He's Doing"	1974	—	—	—	—	—	—	—	—	—		Non-album tracks
"—" denotes a recording that did not chart or was not released.

== Other charted and certified songs ==
Title	Year	Peak chart positions										Certifications	Album
Title	Year	US	AUS	CAN	FRA	GER	ITA	NL	NZ	SWI	UK	Certifications	Album
"Sleigh Ride"	1963	8	9	8	15	39	10	7	9	15	15	RIAA: 3× Platinum; BPI: 2× Platinum; BVMI: Gold; FIMI: Gold; RMNZ: Platinum	A Christmas Gift for You from Phil Spector
"Frosty the Snowman"	1963	—	—	—	—	—	—	—	—	—	— (Note: "Frosty the Snowman" did not enter the UK Singles Chart but peaked at number 85 on the UK Singles Streaming Chart.)	RIAA: Gold; BPI: Gold	A Christmas Gift for You from Phil Spector
"I Saw Mommy Kissing Santa Claus"	1963	—	—	—	—	—	—	—	—	—	—	BPI: Silver	A Christmas Gift for You from Phil Spector
"—" denotes a recording that did not chart or was not released.

== Unreleased music ==
Songs produced by Phil Spector

The Ronettes recorded many songs for producer Phil Spector that were not released until after the group disbanded in 1967. Today, some of their originally unreleased songs are just as critically applauded as their biggest hits. Below is an accurate chart of the unreleased songs the Ronettes recorded for Philles Records that did not see a release. These songs were first issued on later compilation albums, mentioned respectively. Four of the songs below—"The Twist", "Mashed Potato Time", "Hot Pastrami" and "The Wah-Watusi"—were released, and credited to, popular Philles contracted singing group the Crystals, on their 1963 Philles LP, The Crystals Sing the Greatest Hits.

Title	Date recorded	Album issued on	Notes
"The Twist"	1963	The Crystals Sing the Greatest Hits	Credited to the Crystals
"Mashed Potato Time"	1963	The Crystals Sing the Greatest Hits	Credited to the Crystals
"Hot Pastrami"	1963	The Crystals Sing the Greatest Hits	Credited to the Crystals
"The Wah-Watusi"	1963	The Crystals Sing the Greatest Hits	Credited to the Crystals; features Nedra Talley on lead vocals
"Keep On Dancing"	1964	Phil Spector Wall of Sound: Rare Masters, Vol. 2	Features Ronnie, Estelle, and Nedra singing lead in unison
"Girls Can Tell"	1964	Phil Spector Wall of Sound: Rare Masters, Vol. 1	Erroneously credited to the Crystals; a version sung by the Crystals, with Lala Brooks on lead vocals, does exist
"Paradise"	1965	Phil Spector Wall of Sound: Rare Masters, Vol. 1	Covered by the Shangri-Las as well as the Supremes
"Soldier Baby"	1965	Phil Spector Wall of Sound: Rare Masters, Vol. 1	Features Ronnie, Estelle, and Nedra singing lead in unison
"I'm a Woman in Love"	1965	Phil Spector Wall of Sound: Rare Masters, Vol. 1	
"Everything Under the Sun"	1965	Phil Spector Wall of Sound: Rare Masters, Vol. 2	Features Ronnie, Estelle, and Nedra singing lead in unison for most of the song, with Nedra and Estelle continuing the chorus while Ronnie gets solo lines
"I Wish I Never Saw the Sunshine"	1965	Phil Spector Wall of Sound: Rare Masters, Vol. 2	Rerecorded by Ronnie Spector in 1974 for Buddha Records, and for her 1999 solo EP She Talks to Rainbows
"Here I Sit"	1965	Phil Spector Wall of Sound: Rare Masters, Vol. 2	Features male backing vocals
"Lovers"	1965	The Ronettes Sing Their Greatest Hits, Vol. 2	A Ronnie solo
"Padre"	Unknown	Everything You Wanted to Know About the Ronettes... But Were Afraid to Ask	
"Close Your Eyes"	Unknown	Everything You Wanted to Know About the Ronettes... But Were Afraid to Ask	
"Someday (Baby)"	Unknown	Everything You Wanted to Know About the Ronettes... But Were Afraid to Ask	

== Work with Jimi Hendrix ==
During the Summer of 1964, the Ronettes spent a lot of time hanging out at Odine's, an exclusive East Side club on Fifty-Ninth Street in Manhattan. According to Ronnie, that is where the Ronettes were first introduced to Jimi Hendrix, who was an unknown guitarist there at the time. Ronnie used to get up and sing along with Hendrix as he played guitar. After running into Hendrix again at a party in 1969, Estelle and Ronnie were invited into the studio to do backing vocals on Hendrix's "Earth Blues" song. Their work on the backing vocals earned The Ronettes a credit on Hendrix's posthumously released LP Rainbow Bridge, released in October 1971.
