= Is This What I Get for Loving You? =

1965 single by the Ronettes

- US picture sleeve

Single by the Ronettes
- B-side: "Oh, I Love You"
- Released: May 1965
- Genre: Pop
- Length: 2:40
- Label: Philles Records
- Songwriters: Phil Spector; Gerry Goffin; Carole King
- Producer: Phil Spector

The Ronettes singles chronology
"Born To Be Together" (1965)	"Is This What I Get for Loving You?" (1965)	"I Can Hear Music" (1966)

"Is This What I Get for Loving You?" is a pop song written by Phil Spector, Carole King and Gerry Goffin and recorded by 1960s girl group the Ronettes. The song featured Ronettes lead singer Ronnie Spector on lead vocals (credited as Veronica), and Ronettes Nedra Talley and Estelle Bennett on backing vocals. Released on Philles Records, reaching No. 75 on the Billboard Hot 100 in 1965.

== Original recording ==
By 1965, the popularity of the Ronettes had seriously begun to decline. 1964 had proven to be the group's most successful year, as they placed three songs "(The Best Part of) Breakin' Up" (US, #39), "Do I Love You?" (US #34), and "Walking in the Rain" (US #23) in the top forty on the Billboard charts. Their first released single in 1965 was "Born To Be Together," which peaked only at number fifty-two. While achieving only a moderate success, "Born To Be Together" is notable for being the first single by the Ronettes to be issued as "The Ronettes featuring Veronica."

"Is This What I Get for Loving You?" was subsequently credited to "The Ronettes featuring Veronica" on the 45 label.

Moving in a different direction from the typical love songs usually recorded by the Ronettes, "Is This What I Get for Loving You?" was the only Ronettes single to revolve around the depression which sets in after the ending of a relationship. Their other singles, such as "Be My Baby", "Baby, I Love You", and "Do I Love You?", had featured a more up-beat, positive attitude towards love, while "Is This What I Get for Loving You?" moved the Ronettes into a different, more mature direction.

This attempt to create a more mature image for the group proved to be unsuccessful. "Is This What I Get for Loving You?" became one of the Ronettes most unsuccessful singles, peaking only at a disappointing seventy-five.

Cash Box described it as "a medium-paced pop-blues romantic tear-jerker which effectively builds to an exciting dramatic pitch then interestingly changes pace and slows down once again." Record World described it as "nifty blues rock."

== Chart position ==
Single	Chart Position Billboard 100	Chart Position Cashbox 100	Year
"Is This What I Get for Loving You?"	75	92	1965

== Marianne Faithfull version ==
"Is This What I Get for Loving You?"

Single by Marianne Faithfull
- B-side: "Tomorrow's Calling"
- Released: February 1967
- Genre: Pop
- Length: 3:50
- Label: Decca
- Songwriters: Phil Spector; Gerry Goffin; Carole King
- Producer: Andrew Loog Oldham

Marianne Faithfull singles chronology
"Counting" (1966)	"Is This What I Get for Loving You?" (1967)	"Something Better" (1969)

In 1966, "Is This What I Get for Loving You?" was recorded by Marianne Faithfull with Andrew Loog Oldham producing: released February 1967, the single reached #43 in United Kingdom, #42 in Australia and #125 in US. It was her last charting single of the sixties.
