= (The Best Part of) Breakin' Up =

1964 song

Single by the Ronettes

from the album Presenting the Fabulous Ronettes
- B-side: "Big Red"
- Released: April 1964
- Genre: Pop
- Length: 2:55
- Label: Philles Records
- Songwriters: Phil Spector; Pete Andreoli; Vince Poncia
- Producer: Phil Spector

The Ronettes singles chronology
| "Baby, I Love You" (1963) | "(The Best Part of) Breakin' Up" (1964) | "Do I Love You?" (1964) |

"(The Best Part of) Breakin' Up" is a song written by Phil Spector, Pete Andreoli and Vince Poncia. It was first recorded by the Ronettes, produced by Phil Spector and arranged by Jack Nitzsche with Ronnie Spector on lead vocals and with backing vocals by Nedra Talley and Estelle Bennett, along with Darlene Love and the Blossoms, Bobby Sheen (a.k.a. Bob B. Soxx), and Sonny & Cher. The song was released in April 1964, the year widely recognized as the group's most successful year, and proved to be the group's third consecutive top forty hit in the US. The single peaked at number 39 on the U.S. Billboard Hot 100 and number 43 on the UK Singles Chart.

== Original recording ==
With the British Invasion in full force during 1964, many of the previous American groups from the late 1950s/early 1960s found their popularity beginning to seriously wane. For the Ronettes, however, 1964 proved to be their biggest year. While none of their singles matched the success of their 1963 classic "Be My Baby", the group released four songs, all of which reached the top forty on the Billboard Charts in the US. Before making "(The Best Part of) Breakin' Up," their previous single had been the successful "Baby, I Love You", which peaked at number twenty-four on the Billboard charts.

However, according to Ronnie Spector, the group's lead singer, producer Phil Spector had already begun to somewhat lose enthusiasm for the Ronettes in early 1964. The group had recorded the Phil Spector, Jeff Barry, and Ellie Greenwich song "Chapel of Love" in early 1964, but Spector refused to release it. "It doesn't sound like a hit," he told the group, so The Dixie Cups recorded their version of the song, which peaked at number one on the Billboard top 100, a position never held by the Ronettes.

After losing out on "Chapel of Love" the Ronettes went to work on "(The Best Part of) Breakin' Up." According to Ronnie Spector, Phil Spector was especially enthusiastic about the song. "When Phil loved a song as much as he loved "(The Best Part of) Breakin' Up," she later wrote in her autobiography, "he could work on it for days without ever getting tired. He spent hours working out the harmonies with Nedra and Estelle, then he'd jump up and down every time he heard something he liked."

Billboard said of the song that "The gals swing in with a stompin' rock ballad that has that the famous Spector sound." Billboard described the song as having a "smash sound" and praised the lead vocal and arrangement Cash Box described it as "a tantalizing shuffle-thumper that the gals knock out with loads of teen appeal" with a "stand out, percussion-led rock-a-rhythmic arrangement" by Jack Nitzsche. "(The Best Part of) Breakin' Up" proved to be a hit for the Ronettes, though it did not achieve the success of their previous two singles. The song is remembered in the US for being the influence for Folgers advertising campaign "The best part of waking up, is Folgers in your cup," a slogan the company has used since 1984.

== Chart history ==
| Chart (1964) | Peak position |
|---|---|
| U.S. Billboard Hot 100 | 39 |
| U.S. Cashbox Hot 100 | 48 |
| UK Singles Chart | 43 |

== Cover versions ==
The song was a no. 25 UK Singles Chart hit for The Symbols in 1968.

In 1982, American singer Roni Griffith hit number two on the US Dance Club Songs chart for two weeks with her Hi-NRG version of the song, produced by American record producer Bobby Orlando.

The Devil Dogs covered the song on their eponymous debut album in 1989.
