= A Christmas Gift for You from Phil Spector =

A Christmas Gift for You from Philles Records

Studio album by various artists
- Released: November 22, 1963
- Recorded: August–September 1963
- Studios: Gold Star, Hollywood
- Genres: Christmas; pop
- Length: 34:12
- Label: Philles
- Producer: Phil Spector

Phil Spector production chronology
Philles Records Presents Today's Hits (1963)	A Christmas Gift for You from Philles Records (1963)	Presenting the Fabulous Ronettes featuring Veronica (1964)

Singles from A Christmas Gift for You from Philles Records
- 1. "Christmas (Baby Please Come Home)" Released: December 1963

A Christmas Gift for You from Phil Spector (originally A Christmas Gift for You from Philles Records, also known as Phil Spector's Christmas Album) is a multi-artist studio album of Christmas songs, produced by Phil Spector, originally released by Philles in November 1963. Spector treated a series of mostly secular Christmas standards to his Wall of Sound production style, and the selections feature the vocal performances of Spector's regular artists during this period. One month after its release, the album peaked at number 13 on Billboard magazine's special, year-end, weekly Christmas Albums sales chart.

In 2003, the album was voted No. 142 on Rolling Stone magazine's list of the 500 greatest albums of all time, maintaining the rating in a 2012 revised list. In 2017, it was ranked the 130th greatest album of the 1960s by Pitchfork. In 2019, it was ranked the greatest Christmas album of all time by Rolling Stone. The album was included in Robert Dimery's 1001 Albums You Must Hear Before You Die.

== Background and recording ==
Spector conceived the project while producing the Ronettes' single "Be My Baby" in July 1963. Although he was Jewish, he regarded Christmas as his favorite time of year, and sought to apply his Wall of Sound production method to an album of Christmas standards.

Recording took place over six weeks during August and September 1963 at Gold Star Studios in Los Angeles. Spector booked the studio for nearly that entire period, with single sessions occasionally extended through the next day. The project involved all his regular artists, including the Ronettes, Darlene Love, and Bob B. Soxx & the Blue Jeans, as well as arranger Jack Nitzsche. Among the visitors to the sessions were the Beach Boys' Brian Wilson, who attempted to contribute piano to "Santa Claus Is Coming to Town" before Spector rejected his playing.

Engineer Larry Levine later described the intensive schedule as a "nightmare" that left his "nerves shattered" and the musicians fatigued: "It got to the point where Phil and I were at each other’s throats ... He had to have it out and then he wanted the tracks done as singles not as album tracks. I never wanted to work with Phil again after that." Ronettes vocalist Nedra Talley recalled, "You could sense that there was this side of who was gonna get what songs, and the fact that Ronnie and Phil were becoming an item, the others might have felt that there might be some favoritism to the Ronettes. But the other side was that it was so much fun being together and supporting each other and all singing on each other’s songs."

The album concludes with a spoken-word narration by Spector over an instrumental version of "Silent Night", in which he thanks the listeners and acknowledges everyone involved in the project. According to Levine, the original voiceover exceeded five minutes before being edited down to approximately two; Levine remembered Spector "extolling his virtue, how great he was, while trying to sound humble".

== Release history ==
The album has been released several times on different labels, starting with Apple Records in 1972, with different cover art: a photograph of Spector dressed as a heavily bearded Santa Claus, wearing a "Back to Mono" button art directed and designed by John Kosh. Additional reissues on Warner-Spector in 1974 (for the first time in stereo), Pavilion (a short-lived imprint of CBS) in 1981, and Passport in 1984 would also use this cover, sometimes with the "Back to Mono" button designed by John Kosh airbrushed out.

The original cover was restored in time for the album's first CD issue by Phil Spector International through Rhino. It was mastered by Bill Inglot and Ken Perry and it restored the album's original mono mix. The second CD issue was in 1987 as well, on Chrysalis (CCD 1625) in monophonic for the UK market. This one is co-credited "Spector Records International" and features the slightly different international artwork, it features the same mastering as the Rhino CD. The more common third CD issue came in 1989, a remastered release on ABKCO which restored the original title, artwork, and mono mix, this edition was remastered by Phil Spector and Larry Levine. The album also appeared as the fourth disc of ABKCO's 1991 Spector box set, Back to Mono, and as the second disc of the 2006 UK-only ABKCO compilation The Phil Spector Collection.

Sony Music took over distribution rights to the Philles Records catalog in 2009 and re-released the mono album, remastered by Bob Ludwig, on its Legacy Recordings imprint on October 27 of that year. (The Sundazed label also reissued the album on vinyl in 2009.) In 2012, Legacy Recordings released a two-disc set in the UK only, containing a new remastering of the mono album by Vic Anesini on the first disc and a selection of non-Christmas Spector hits and rarities on the second disc.

== Reception ==
Professional ratings
Review scores
Source	Rating
AllMusic	5/5 stars
Encyclopedia of Popular Music	5/5 stars
Record Mirror	5/5 stars

The album, released in the United States on November 22, 1963—the same day that President John F. Kennedy was assassinated—was a relative failure at the time. Original pressings are scarce and collectable, now selling for $400–$500 in excellent condition.

In subsequent years, especially after its reissue on Apple, the album grew in popularity and is considered now to be a holiday classic. Several of its tracks became iconic Christmas songs for generations, such as the original single "Christmas (Baby Please Come Home)," and the well-known "Ring-a-ling-a-ling Ding-dong-ding" background vocals in the Ronettes' "Sleigh Ride". The arrangement of Bruce Springsteen's version of "Santa Claus Is Comin' to Town" is based in part on the Crystals' version of the song, and U2's late-1980s remake of "Christmas (Baby Please Come Home)" that appeared on the first A Very Special Christmas album is patterned after the Darlene Love original that appeared on the Spector LP. The Ronettes' versions of "Frosty The Snowman" and "I Saw Mommy Kissing Santa Claus" also usually get some radio airplay during the holiday season.

== Commercial performance ==
On its initial release, the album held the No. 13 spot on Billboard's Christmas Albums chart for two consecutive weeks. An Apple reissue of the album went to No. 6 on the same chart in December 1972, which was its highest chart ranking. The album made its debut on the UK Albums Chart in 1972; it would re-chart in 1983, peaking at No. 19.

On the week ending December 15, 2018, A Christmas Gift for You from Phil Spector entered the main Billboard 200 albums chart for the first time (at position No. 48), eventually peaking at No. 12 three weeks later. At the same time, the Ronettes' recording of "Sleigh Ride", though never released as a single, charted on the Billboard Hot 100 for the first time, initially reaching as high as No. 26 on the week ending January 5, 2019; it then re-charted during the 2019 and 2020 holiday seasons and attained a peak position of No. 13 on the week ending January 2, 2021, before rising to No. 10 during the following holiday season. The album itself returned to No. 12 on the Billboard 200 chart on the chart dated January 2, 2021, and rose to No. 10 one year later (on the chart dated January 8, 2022). Four years later (on the chart dated January 3, 2026), A Christmas Gift for You from Phil Spector climbed to an overall peak position of No. 5.

== Track listing ==
Side one
No.	Title	Writer(s)	Artist	Length
1.	"White Christmas"	Irving Berlin	Darlene Love	2:52
2.	"Frosty the Snowman"	Steve Nelson, Walter Rollins	The Ronettes	2:16
3.	"The Bells of St. Mary's"	A. Emmett Adams, Douglas Furber	Bob B. Soxx & the Blue Jeans	2:54
4.	"Santa Claus Is Coming to Town"	J. Fred Coots, Haven Gillespie	The Crystals	3:24
5.	"Sleigh Ride"	Leroy Anderson, Mitchell Parish	The Ronettes	3:00
6.	"Marshmallow World"	Carl Sigman, Peter DeRose	Darlene Love	2:23
Total length:				16:49

Side two
No.	Title	Writer(s)	Artist	Length
1.	"I Saw Mommy Kissing Santa Claus"	Tommie Connor	The Ronettes	2:37
2.	"Rudolph the Red-Nosed Reindeer"	Johnny Marks	The Crystals	2:30
3.	"Winter Wonderland"	Felix Bernard, Dick Smith	Darlene Love	2:25
4.	"Parade of the Wooden Soldiers"	Leon Jessel	The Crystals	2:55
5.	"Christmas (Baby Please Come Home)"	Ellie Greenwich, Jeff Barry, Phil Spector	Darlene Love	2:45
6.	"Here Comes Santa Claus"	Gene Autry, Oakley Haldeman	Bob B. Soxx & the Blue Jeans	2:03
7.	"Silent Night"	Josef Mohr, Franz X. Gruber	Phil Spector and Artists	2:08
Total length:				17:23

== Personnel ==
According to Jim Bessman's 2009 liner notes, except where noted:

Session musicians

- Hal Blaine – drums
- Lou Blackburn – horns
- Jimmy Bond – bass
- Sonny Bono – percussion
- Frank Capp – percussion
- Roy Caton – trumpet
- Steve Douglas – baritone saxophone
- Al De Lory – piano
- Barney Kessel – guitar
- Jay Migliori – saxophone
- Jack Nitzsche – arrangements, percussion
- Bill Pitman – guitar
- Ray Pohlman – bass
- Don Randi – piano
- Irv Rubins – guitar
- Leon Russell – piano
- Tommy Tedesco – guitar
- Nino Tempo – guitar
- Johnny Vidor – strings

Production

- Phil Spector – producer
- Larry Levine – engineer
- Mastering (1987 CDs) – Bill Inglot, Ken Perry at K-Disc Mastering
- Remastering (1989) – Phil Spector, Larry Levine
- Remastering (2009) – Bob Ludwig at Gateway Mastering
- Remastering (2012) – Vic Anesini

== Charts ==
=== Weekly charts ===
Original release
Chart (1963)	Peak position
US Christmas Albums (Billboard)	13

Reissues
Chart (2018–2026)	Peak position
Canadian Albums (Billboard)	3
Finnish Albums (Suomen virallinen lista)	34
Hungarian Albums (MAHASZ)	24
Icelandic Albums (Tónlistinn)	34
Italian Albums (FIMI)	50
Japanese Hot Albums (Billboard Japan)	76
Latvian Albums (LaIPA)	78
Lithuanian Albums (AGATA)	9
Norwegian Albums (VG-lista)	35
Portuguese Albums (AFP)	195
Swedish Albums (Sverigetopplistan)	21
UK Albums (Official Charts)	69
US Billboard 200	5
US Top R&B/Hip-Hop Albums (Billboard)	2

=== Year-end charts ===
Year-end chart performance for A Christmas Gift for You from Phil Spector
Year	Chart	Position
2019	US Top R&B/Hip-Hop Albums (Billboard)	96
2020	US Top R&B/Hip-Hop Albums (Billboard)	83
2021	US Top R&B/Hip-Hop Albums (Billboard)	72
2022
2022	US Billboard 200	196
2022	US Top R&B/Hip-Hop Albums (Billboard)	66
2023
2023	US Billboard 200	200
2023	US Top R&B/Hip-Hop Albums (Billboard)	62
2024	US Top R&B/Hip-Hop Albums (Billboard)	55
2025	US Top R&B/Hip-Hop Albums (Billboard)	62

== Certifications ==
Certifications for A Christmas Gift for You from Phil Spector
Region	Certification	Certified units/sales
United Kingdom (BPI)	Platinum	300,000^{‡}
^{‡} Sales+streaming figures based on certification alone.
