= Baby I Love You (album) =

Studio album by Andy Kim
- Released: 1969
- Genre: Pop rock
- Label: Steed
- Producer: Jeff Barry

Andy Kim chronology
| Rainbow Ride (1969) | Baby I Love You (1969) | Andy Kim (1973) |

Professional ratings
Review scores
| Source | Rating |
|---|---|
| AllMusic | 4/5 stars |

Baby I Love You is a studio album by Canadian pop rock singer and songwriter Andy Kim, released in 1969 by Steed Records.

The single title song hit #9 on the Billboard Hot 100, #1 in Canada, and #32 on the U.S. adult contemporary chart in 1969. The single "So Good Together" hit #36 on the Billboard Hot 100 and #37 in West Germany. The album landed on the Billboard 200 chart, reaching #82.

== Track listing ==
1. "Baby, I Love You" (Phil Spector, Jeff Barry, Ellie Greenwich)
2. "Walkin' My La De Da" (Andy Kim, Jeff Barry)
3. "If I Were a Carpenter" (Tim Hardin)
4. "Let's Get Married" (Andy Kim, Jeff Barry)
5. "By the Time I Get to Phoenix" (Jimmy Webb)
6. "I'll Be Loving You" (Andy Kim, Jeff Barry)
7. "So Good Together" (Andy Kim, Jeff Barry)
8. "I Got to Know" (Andy Kim, Jeff Barry)
9. "This Is the Girl" (Giovanni Di Benedetto, Steve Tudanger)
10. "Didn't Have to Tell Her" (Andy Kim, Jeff Barry)
11. "This Guy's in Love with You" (Burt Bacharach, Hal David)

== Chart positions ==
Album

| Year | Chart | Peak Position |
|---|---|---|
| 1969 | Billboard 200 | 82 |

Singles

| Year | Single | Chart | Peak Position |
|---|---|---|---|
| 1969 | "Baby, I Love You" | Canada | 1 |
| 1969 | "Baby, I Love You" | Billboard Hot 100 | 9 |
| 1969 | "Baby, I Love You" | Adult Contemporary Chart | 31 |
| 1969 | "So Good Together" | Billboard Hot 100 | 36 |
| 1969 | "So Good Together" | West Germany | 37 |
