= Presenting the Fabulous Ronettes =

1964 studio album by the Ronettes

Studio album by the Ronettes featuring Veronica
- Released: November 1964
- Studios: Gold Star, Hollywood
- Genre: Pop
- Length: 36:34
- Label: Philles
- Producer: Phil Spector

Phil Spector production chronology
A Christmas Gift for You (1963)	Presenting the Fabulous Ronettes (1964)	You've Lost That Lovin' Feelin' (1965)

Singles from Presenting the Fabulous Ronettes
- 1. "Be My Baby" Released: 1963; 2. "Do I Love You?" Released: 1964; 3. "Walking in the Rain" Released: October 12, 1964; 4. "Baby, I Love You" Released: 1964; 5. "(The Best Part of) Breakin' Up" Released: 1964

Professional ratings
Review scores
Source	Rating
Record Mirror	4/5 stars

Presenting the Fabulous Ronettes is the only studio album by the American girl group the Ronettes (credited to "the Ronettes featuring Veronica"). Produced by Phil Spector and released in November 1964 through his label, Philles Records, the album collects the group's singles from 1963–1964. In 2003, it was ranked number 422 on Rolling Stone's list of "The 500 Greatest Albums of All Time". In Rolling Stone's 2023 revision to that list, the album was ranked 494.

== Track listing ==
Side one
No.	Title	Writer(s)	Length
1.	"Walking in the Rain"	Cynthia Weil; Barry Mann; Phil Spector	3:16
2.	"Do I Love You?"	Vini Poncia; Pete Andreoli; Spector	2:50
3.	"So Young"	William Tyus	2:36
4.	"(The Best Part of) Breakin' Up"	Poncia; Andreoli; Spector	3:02
5.	"I Wonder"	Jeff Barry; Ellie Greenwich; Spector	2:51
6.	"What'd I Say"	Ray Charles	4:40

Side two
No.	Title	Writer(s)	Length
7.	"Be My Baby"	Barry; Greenwich; Spector	2:40
8.	"You, Baby"	Weil; Mann; Spector	2:56
9.	"Baby, I Love You"	Barry; Greenwich; Spector	2:50
10.	"How Does It Feel?"	Poncia; Andreoli; Spector	2:40
11.	"When I Saw You"	Spector	2:43
12.	"Chapel of Love"	Barry; Greenwich; Spector	2:54
Total length:			36:34

1990 Japan CD Edition Bonus Tracks
No.	Title	Writer(s)	Length
13.	"You Came, You Saw, You Conquered!"	Spector; Irwin Levine; Toni Wine	2:49
14.	"Oh, I Love You"	Spector	2:29

== Personnel ==
The Ronettes

- Estelle Bennett – vocals
- Veronica Bennett – vocals
- Nedra Talley – vocals

Production

- Phil Spector – producer
- Jack Nitzsche – arranger
- Larry Levine – engineer

Additional musicians

- Don Randi – piano
- Al De Lory – piano
- Larry Knechtel – piano, bass guitar
- Leon Russell – piano
- Harold Battiste – piano
- Steve Douglas, Jay Migliori, Lou Blackburn, Roy Caton – horns
- Ray Pohlman – bass guitar
- Jimmy Bond – bass guitar
- Hal Blaine – drums
- Barney Kessel – guitars
- Tom Tedesco – guitars
- Carol Kaye – guitars
- Bill Pitman – guitars
- Vincent Poncia Jr. – guitars
- Frank Capp – percussion
- Julius Wechter – percussion
- Sonny Bono – percussion
