= Andy Kim (singer) =

Canadian pop rock singer and songwriter (born 1946)

Andy Kim OC
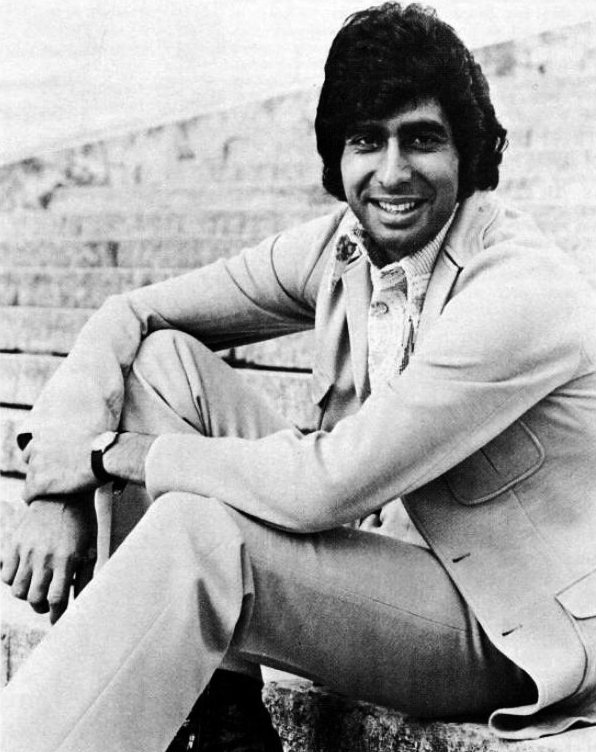
- Kim in 1970

Background information
- Also known as: Baron Longfellow; Longfellow
- Born: Androwis Youakim; 5 December 1946 (age 79) (Note: 5 December 1946 is cited by VH1, United Press International, and Rolling Stone, while 5 December 1952 is cited by sources including AllMusic and Billboard Books. Various published interviews with Kim from the mid-1970s support the 1946 dating, while Kim's current biography on his official website offers no specific year of birth.); Montreal, Quebec, Canada
- Genre: Pop rock
- Occupations: Singer; songwriter
- Instrument: Vocals
- Years active: 1963–present
- Website: andykimmusic.com
- Awards: Officer of the Order of Canada (2023); Canadian Music Hall of Fame (2019)

Androwis Youakim OC (born 5 December 1946), better known as Andy Kim, is a Canadian pop rock singer and songwriter. He grew up in Montreal, Quebec. He is known for hits that he released in the late 1960s and 1970s: the international hit "Baby, I Love You" in 1969, and "Rock Me Gently", which topped the U.S. singles chart in 1974. He co-wrote "Sugar, Sugar" in 1968 and sang on the recording as part of the Archies; it was number one for four weeks in the USA and was "Record of the Year" for 1969.

He has recorded under the stage name Baron Longfellow since 1978 or just as Longfellow in the early 1990s. He continues to perform under his original recording name of Andy Kim.

== Life and career ==
Kim was born Androwis Youakim (Arabic: أندرواس يوآكيم) on 5 December 1946 in Montreal, the third of four sons of Lebanese immigrants. His parents came from the mountains of Lebanon. In his teens, he moved to New York to pursue a career in music in the Brill Building. He recorded as "Andy Kim", using the different last name, though on his earliest releases he used the name "Youakim" in the writing credits.

In 1968, after minor recording successes over the previous few years, Kim released the single "How'd We Ever Get This Way?" on the Steed label; it just missed the U.S. Top 20, reaching number 21. He also co-wrote, with Jeff Barry, "Sugar, Sugar" which was a hit single for the Archies, reaching number one on the U.S. Billboard Hot 100 and ultimately becoming the RIAA Record of the Year. Kim and Barry wrote more songs for the Archies, and also for the Monkees' album Changes in 1970, which Barry produced.

In 1969, Kim had two hit singles, "Rainbow Ride", which made the US Top 50, and "Baby, I Love You", which got to number nine in the US and number one in Canada; it was so popular in Canada, it earned him a Gold Leaf (Juno) Award in 1970 as the country's Best Male Vocalist. "Baby, I Love You" sold over one million copies, and was awarded a gold disc by the R.I.A.A. in October 1969.

Over the next few years, Kim recorded a few minor hits, including "Be My Baby" and "It's Your Life" (in 1970) and toured North America extensively. In the spring of 1974, he released the self-penned "Rock Me Gently", which went to number one on the Billboard Hot 100 chart, and to number two on the UK Singles Chart. "Rock Me Gently" sold three million copies globally, earning Kim his second gold disc.

Kim had shied away from touring for years before then, when he was working with the Steed label. He has said that he had created a person in his music in the vein of a white blond surfer and that fans were shocked to see his dark skin colour and appearance. He had also altered his voice on his earlier records to sound younger.

In 1976, Kim altered the spelling of his pseudonym to Andy Kimm, and released a few singles under that name on his own Ice Records label in 1976 and '77. Shortly thereafter, he adopted the stage name Baron Longfellow and issued the first single ("Shady Hollow Dreamer") under that name in 1978. It was followed by a self-titled album Baron Longfellow with the hit single "Amour" in 1980 and, also under the same pseudonym, in 1984 released Prisoner by Design. Both of these albums met with moderate success. In 1991, Kim again went by Longfellow and recorded the single "Powerdrive", which received radio airplay on several radio stations across Canada.

In 1985, Andy Kim joined his voice to the Northern Lights project, created and organized by Bruce Allen, in order to raise funds for relief of the 1983–85 famine in Ethiopia. With other Canadian artists such as Bryan Adams, Liona Boyd, John Candy, Bruce Cockburn, Burton Cummings, Lisa Dalbello, David Foster, Corey Hart, Dan Hill, Paul Hyde, Geddy Lee, Gordon Lightfoot, Richard Manuel, Murray McLauchlan, Joni Mitchell, Kim Mitchell, Aldo Nova, Oscar Peterson, Mike Reno, Paul Shaffer, Ian Thomas, Sylvia Tyson, Jim Vallance, etc. It followed Band Aid's "Do They Know It's Christmas?" British project with Bob Geldof and Midge Ure in November 1984. The Northern Lights song Tears Are Not Enough was written by David Foster, Jim Vallance, Bryan Adams, Rachel Paiement, Paul Hyde and Bob Rock and recorded on February 10, 1985 at Manta Sound studios in Toronto.

In 1995, Kim played at the Kumbaya Festival, at which the Barenaked Ladies were also performing. Nearly a decade later, the band's Ed Robertson convinced Kim to come out of retirement. Robertson co-wrote the song "I Forgot to Mention" with him and offered to produce the track. The single was released on a 5-track EP in 2004 which included a re-recording of "Powerdrive".

In March 2005, Kim received the annual "Indie Award" for Favourite Solo Artist during Canadian Music Week. The music video for "Love Is...", released in the summer of 2005, reached number one at Bravo.ca. In 2005, he co-wrote "What Ever Happened to Christmas" with Ron Sexsmith. The same year, he established the Andy Kim Christmas Show – a live concert at the Mod Club Theatre in Toronto in which a variety of artists were invited to perform mostly Christmas music. The show was produced by Blair Packham from The Jitters. Former MuchMusic personality Kim Clarke Champniss says he came up with the idea for the show.

Kim's band acted as house band for the artists, who donated their time for the show. Proceeds were donated to the CHUM/CITY Christmas Wish. The show repeated in 2006, with a similar lineup. Proceeds from the show went to support the Children's Aid Foundation, and the edited show was aired on Mix 99.9 on Christmas Eve and Day. The Andy Kim Christmas show became an annual tradition. The annual show either took place at the Mod Club or Phoenix Concert Theatre or Massey Hall in Toronto, with proceeds from the evening donated to a different children's charity each year.

In 2007, Kim's music came again into the public eye, as "Rock Me Gently" was sped up slightly and used by Jeep for their Jeep Liberty commercial ("Pouring In"). His name can be seen on the radio display near the beginning of the commercial.

In 2009, Kim was inducted into the Hit Parade Hall of Fame.

In 2011, E1 Music Canada released Happen Again, Kim's first album since 2004.

In 2014, he collaborated with Kevin Drew on the album It's Decided, released on 24 February 2015 on Arts & Crafts.

On 23 July 2018, Canada's Walk of Fame included Andy Kim on its list of 2018 inductees. He became part of the Canadian Music Hall of Fame in 2019. He was named an Officer of the Order of Canada in 2023.

== Discography ==
=== Albums ===
List of studio albums, with selected chart positions
Title	Album details	Peak chart positions
Title	Album details	US
How'd We Ever Get This Way	Released: 1968; Label: Steed Records	—
Rainbow Ride	Released: 1969; Label: Steed Records	—
Baby I Love You	Released: 1969; Label: Steed Records	82
Andy Kim	Released: 1973; Label: Uni Records (Uni 73137)	—
Andy Kim	Released: 1973; Label: Capitol Records (Capitol 81739)	21
Andy Kim II	Released: 1974; Label: Capitol Records (Capitol 81921)	—
Baron Longfellow	Released: 1980; Label: ICE Records	—
Prisoner By Design	Released: 1984; Label: ICE Records	—
I Forgot to Mention	Released: 2004; Label: Iceworks Records	—
Happen Again	Released: 2011; Label: Angel Air Records	—
It's Decided	Released: 2015; Label: Arts & Crafts	—
"—" denotes a recording that did not chart or was not released in that territory.

=== Compilation albums ===
List of compilation albums, with selected chart positions
Title	Album details	Peak chart positions
Title	Album details	US
Andy Kim's Greatest Hits	Released: 1974; Label: Dunhill Records	190
Reflections: The Best of Andy Kim	Released: 1994; Label: Common Folk Records	—
Baby I Love You: Greatest Hits	Released: 1996; Label: EMI ELECTROLA GmbH Records	—
"—" denotes a recording that did not chart or was not released in that territory.

=== Singles ===
List of singles, with selected chart positions
Title A-side/B-side	Year	Peak chart positions						Album
Title A-side/B-side	Year	CAN	AUS	GER	UK	US 100	US AC	Album
"I Loved You Once"	1963	—	—	—	—	—	—	
"Give Me Your Love"	1964	—	—	—	—	—	—	
"I Hear You Say (I Love You Baby)" "Falling in Love"	1965	—	—	—	—	—	—	
"That Girl"	1968	—	—	—	—	—	—	
"How'd We Ever Get This Way?" "Are You Ever Coming Home?"	1968	9	64	—	—	21	—	How'd We Ever Get This Way
"Shoot 'Em Up Baby" "Ordinary Kind of Girl"	1968	29	96	—	—	31	—	How'd We Ever Get This Way
"Rainbow Ride" "Resurrection"	1968	43	—	—	—	49	—	Rainbow Ride
"I Hear You Say (I Love You Baby)"	1969	—	—	—	—	—	—	
"Tricia Tell Your Daddy" "Foundation of My Soul"	1969	76	—	—	—	—	—	
"Baby, I Love You" "Gee Girl"	1969	1	15	—	—	9	31	Baby I Love You
"So Good Together" "I Got to Know"	1969	15	38	37	—	36	—	Baby I Love You
"A Friend in the City" "You"	1970	19		—	—	90	—	
"It's Your Life" "To Be Continued"	1970	73	—	—	—	85	—	
"Be My Baby" "Love That Little Woman"	1970	6	36	24	—	17	24	
"I Wish I Were" "Walkin' My La De Da"	1971	22	—	—	—	62	40	
"I Been Moved" "If I Had You Here"	1971	39	—	—	—	97	—	
"Love The Poor Boy" "A Love Song"	1972	69	—	—	—	—	—	
"Who Has The Answers?" "Shady Hollow Dreamer"	1972	12	—	—	—	—	—	Andy Kim
"Oh What a Day" "Sunshine"	1972	42	—	—	—	—	—	Andy Kim
"Rock Me Gently" "Rock Me Gently Part II"	1974	1	31	33	2	1	40	Andy Kim (Capitol)
"Fire, Baby I'm on Fire" "Here Comes The Mornin'"	1974	15	—	—	—	28	—	Andy Kim (Capitol)
"The Essence of Joan" "Rock Me Gently Part II"	1975	28	—	—	—	—	—	
"Mary Ann" "You Are My Everything"	1975	90	—	—	—	—	—	
"Oh, Pretty Woman"	1976	—	—	—	—	—	—	
"Powerdrive"	1991	—	—	—	—	—	—	
"I Forgot To Mention"	2004	10	—	—	—	—	—	I Forgot to Mention
"Happen Again"	2010	—	—	—	—	—	—	Happen Again
"Longest Time"	2015	—	—	—	—	—	—	It's Decided
"—" denotes a recording that did not chart or was not released in that territory.
