= Sleigh Ride =

Winter song

Song
- Language: English
- Published: 1948 by Mills Music
- Genre: Light
- Composer: Leroy Anderson
- Lyricist: Mitchell Parish

"Sleigh Ride" is a light orchestra standard composed by Leroy Anderson, who formed the idea for the piece during a heat wave in July 1947, and finished it in February 1948. Its first performance was by the Boston Pops Orchestra, with Arthur Fiedler conducting, on May 4, 1948. Anderson also made additional parts and arrangements for wind band and piano.

The earliest recordings were made before lyrics were added to Anderson's instrumental composition: it was first recorded in 1949 by Fiedler and the Boston Pops. As a 45 rpm version issued on red vinyl, "Sleigh Ride" was a hit record on RCA Victor Red Seal and has become one of the orchestra's best-known works. The Pops have recorded the piece numerous times, with Fiedler as well as John Williams, their conductor from 1979 to 1995, and Keith Lockhart, their conductor as of June 2008.

In 1950, publisher Mills Music commissioned Mitchell Parish to write lyrics, describing riding in a sleigh and other wintertime activities.

The Ronettes recorded a cover of "Sleigh Ride" in 1963 for Phil Spector's A Christmas Gift for You, which was commercially successful in the United States and featured in various media. The song has since been associated with the Christmas and holiday season.

== Details ==
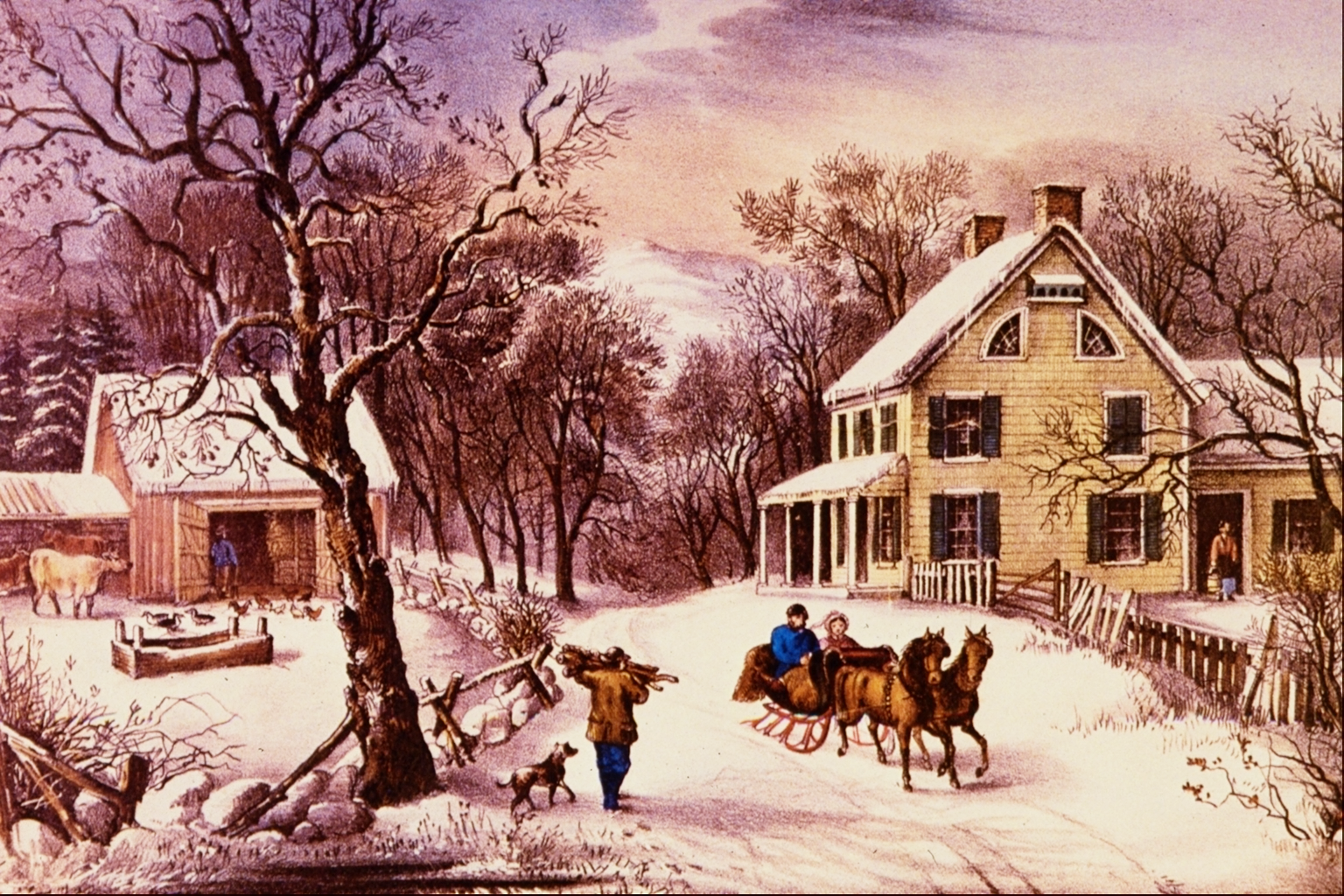
"American Homestead, Winter", a lithograph by Currier and Ives, 1867. The song's lyrics refer to a "picture print by Currier and Ives", whose lithographs were popular in the 19th century.

Leroy Anderson's own recording of "Sleigh Ride" was made on September 11, 1950, and was released on his album "Leroy Anderson Conducts His Own Compositions" on the Decca label in 1951. Also released that year as a 78-rpm single, then reissued as a 45-rpm single the following year when it reached #26 on the Cash Box bestsellers' chart.

The main melody of "Sleigh Ride" was used, but without crediting Anderson, as the main theme of Victor Young's score for the 1949 Western Streets of Laredo. Mitchell Parish worked with Young at this approximate time, writing the lyrics for Young's recording of Hoagy Carmichael's previously instrumental "Stardust". In 1950, the Andrews Sisters recorded the first vocal version of "Sleigh Ride", using the lyrics Parish had written. Although the song is often associated with Christmas and appears on Christmas compilation albums, its lyrics do not mention any holidays.

The piece is noted for the sounds of a horse clip-clopping, and a whip used to get the horse moving. In most performances, a percussionist provides these sounds on temple blocks and a slapstick, respectively. Toward the end of the piece, a trumpet imitates the sound of a horse whinnying.

According to the American Society of Composers, Authors and Publishers (ASCAP), "Sleigh Ride" consistently ranks as one of the top 10 most-performed songs written by ASCAP members. ASCAP named "Sleigh Ride" the most popular piece of Christmas music in the U.S. between 2009 and 2012 based on performance data from over 2,500 radio stations. Anderson's recording remains the most popular instrumental version, while Johnny Mathis's has become the most popular vocal version.

Biographer Steve Metcalf said, "'Sleigh Ride'... has been performed and recorded by a wider array of musical artists than any other piece in the history of Western music."

"Sleigh Ride" is written in seven-part rondo form (though performers sometimes omit the final B section, effectively rendering it a five-part rondo).

== The Ronettes version ==
"Sleigh Ride"

Single by the Ronettes

from the album A Christmas Gift for You
- Released: November 22, 1963
- Recorded: 1963
- Genre: Christmas
- Length: 3:01
- Label: Philles
- Songwriters: Leroy Anderson; Mitchell Parish
- Producer: Phil Spector

"Sleigh Ride" was covered by the American girl group the Ronettes. The Phil Spector-produced recording has become the most popular version outside the traditional pop standard genre, charting yearly in Billboard's Top Ten U.S. Holiday 100 for many years. In 2021, it became the group's second US top 10 hit in 58 years, after "Be My Baby", ultimately peaking at #8 in 2023 during its 26th week (cumulatively) in the Hot 100. It features the well-known "Ring-a-ling-a-ling, ding-dong-ding" background vocals, and the clip-clop and whinny of a horse at its beginning and end. Both bridge sections were omitted from this version, leaving only the refrains intact.

=== Weekly charts ===
Chart (1963–2026)	Peak position
Australia (ARIA)	9
Austria (Ö3 Austria Top 40)	27
Belgium (Ultratop 50 Flanders)	15
Belgium (Ultratop 50 Wallonia)	15
Canada Hot 100 (Billboard)	8
Croatia (Billboard)	25
Czech Republic Singles Digital (ČNS IFPI)	26
Estonia Airplay (TopHit)	26
Finland (Suomen virallinen lista)	41
France (SNEP)	15
Germany (GfK)	39
Global 200 (Billboard)	12
Greece International (IFPI)	13
Hungary (Single Top 40)	15
Hungary (Stream Top 40)	13
Ireland (IRMA)	14
Italy (FIMI)	10
Latvia Streaming (LaIPA)	9
Lithuania (AGATA)	11
Luxembourg (Billboard)	11
Netherlands (Single Top 100)	7
New Zealand (Recorded Music NZ)	9
Norway (IFPI Norge)	87
Poland (Polish Streaming Top 100)	12
Portugal (AFP)	20
Scottish Singles Sales (Official Charts)	65
Slovakia Singles Digital (ČNS IFPI)	20
Spain (PROMUSICAE)	47
Sweden (Sverigetopplistan)	38
Switzerland (Schweizer Hitparade)	15
UK Singles (Official Charts)	15
US Billboard Hot 100	8
US Holiday 100 (Billboard)	7
US Rolling Stone Top 100	10

=== Year-end charts ===
Year-end chart performance
Chart (2023)	Position
Hungary (Single Top 40)	96
US Streaming Songs (Billboard)	75

=== Certifications and sales ===
Region	Certification	Certified units/sales
Denmark (IFPI Danmark)	Platinum	90,000^{‡}
Germany (BVMI)	Gold	300,000^{‡}
Italy (FIMI)	Gold	35,000^{‡}
New Zealand (RMNZ)	Platinum	30,000^{‡}
Portugal (AFP)	Platinum	25,000^{‡}
Spain (Promusicae)	Gold	30,000^{‡}
United Kingdom (BPI)	2× Platinum	1,200,000^{‡}
United States (RIAA)	3× Platinum	3,000,000^{‡}
Streaming
Greece (IFPI Greece)	Platinum	2,000,000^{†}
^{‡} Sales+streaming figures based on certification alone.^{†} Streaming-only figures based on certification alone.

== Gwen Stefani version ==
"Sleigh Ride"

Promotional single by Gwen Stefani

from the album You Make It Feel Like Christmas
- Released: October 13, 2020
- Recorded: 2020
- Genre: Christmas
- Length: 2:33
- Label: Interscope
- Composers: Leroy Anderson; Mitchell Parish
- Producers: Brent Kutzle; Brandon Collins

=== Background and release ===
Stefani released her fourth studio album, You Make It Feel Like Christmas through Interscope Records, on October 6, 2017, a collection of six original songs and six cover versions of Christmas standards. The album was preceded by the release of lead single "You Make It Feel Like Christmas", a duet with her boyfriend, American singer Blake Shelton. According to Stefani, the album's initial release generated a positive response, allowing her to return to the studio with collaborators busbee and Justin Tranter. The following year, You Make It Feel Like Christmas was reissued with five new bonus tracks and a proper music video for the title track was released.

In 2019, Stefani duetted with Shelton again on "Nobody but You", a new track recorded for his compilation album, Fully Loaded: God's Country. The song was released as a single and distributed to US country radio outlets on January 21, 2020. It became a hit, topping Billboard's Country Airplay and Digital Songs charts and becoming Stefani's highest-charting effort on the Billboard Hot 100 since 2007. In late 2020, rumors of new solo music from Stefani circulated after it was announced she would be returning as a judge to the American television series The Voice. Stefani then confirmed plans to release new music during a promotional advertisement made for the show. Her cover of "Sleigh Ride" was announced as a surprise to her fans on October 12, 2020, the day before its scheduled release. It is expected to appear as the eighteenth track on an upcoming reissue of You Make It Feel Like Christmas, due for release later in 2020.

"Sleigh Ride" was produced by American musicians Brent Kutzle and Brandon Collins. It is the first track from You Make It Feel Like Christmas that was not produced by busbee or Eric Valentine; busbee had previously co-written all of the original songs on the parent album with Stefani and Tranter, but died in September 2019 after a battle with glioblastoma. Stefani's cover of "Sleigh Ride" credits Anderson and Parish as composers. The song was released to music retailers for digital download and streaming on October 13, 2020, through Interscope Records. A promotional audio video of the song was uploaded to Stefani's YouTube channel the same day of its release. It serves as first solo release since the rest of You Make It Feel Like Christmas. Alongside the release of "Sleigh Ride", Stefani teased that there was "more to come" the following week.

=== Composition ===
Stefani's version of "Sleigh Ride" has been described as a holiday-themed song with a "lushly" arranged orchestra. American musician Ryan Tedder contributes as a vocal producer of the song, and Stefani is accompanied by American singer Laura Cooksey for background vocals.

=== Critical reception ===
Sophie Smith from the entertainment website uDiscover Music was positive about Stefani's cover, calling it a "cheery" and "festive" new track. A contributor to WSRW felt that Stefani got "in the holiday spirit" with her cover, but felt that it was released too early before the holiday season.

=== Credits and personnel ===
Credits adapted from AllMusic.

- Gwen Stefani – primary artist
- Brandon Collins – producer, strings contractor
- Brent Kutzle – producer, keyboards
- Leroy Anderson – composer
- Mitchell Parish – composer
- Ryan Tedder – vocal producer
- John Nathaniel – vocal producer, mixing
- Grant Pittman – engineer, keyboards
- Doug Sarrett – engineer
- Tyler Spry – engineer
- Mike Wilson – engineer
- Chris Gehringer – mastering engineer
- Laura Cooksey – background vocals
- Luke Sullivant – acoustic guitar, electric guitar
- Matt Melton – bass
- Paul Nelson – cello
- Jon Hyrkas – drums
- Betsy Lamb – viola, violin
- David Angell – violin
- David Davidson – violin

=== Charts ===
Chart performance for "Sleigh Ride"
Chart (2020)	Peak position
US Holiday Digital Song Sales (Billboard)	6

=== Release history ===
Release dates and formats for "Sleigh Ride"
Region	Date	Format(s)	Label	Ref.
Various	October 13, 2020	Digital download; streaming	Interscope	

== Other notable recordings ==
As of 2025, there were 16 versions of "Sleigh Ride" among the 500 most-played records on the Christmas music radio format, the fourth-most of any song (behind "Have Yourself a Merry Little Christmas", "Winter Wonderland" and "Santa Claus Is Comin' to Town").

- 1949 – Arthur Fiedler and the Boston Pops, RCA Victor Red Seal 10-1484 (78 rpm) and 49-01515 (45 rpm). The original hit recording, this version was unavailable on CD until its inclusion on the 2023 Real Gone Music compilation The Ultimate Pops Christmas Party.
- 1951 – Leroy Anderson and His "Pops" Concert Orchestra, Decca Gold Label Series 16000 (78 rpm) 9-16000 (45 rpm). Released both individually and as part of the 10" album Leroy Anderson Conducts His Own Compositions. This version (recorded September 1950) receives frequent airplay during the holiday season and has appeared on various compilations. Leroy Anderson re-recorded "Sleigh Ride" in stereo for the 1959 Decca LP Leroy Anderson Conducts Leroy Anderson.
- 1950 – The Andrews Sisters (the first vocal version)
- 1952 – Bing Crosby, included on 1998's (1935–1956) The Voice of Christmas
- 1958 – Johnny Mathis – Merry Christmas
- 1959 – Andre Kostelanetz and His Orchestra – Joy to the World: Music for Christmas. This version subsequently appeared on his 1963 LP Wonderland of Christmas, as well as on numerous compilations.
- 1960 – Ella Fitzgerald – Ella Wishes You a Swinging Christmas; this version was later featured in the 2003 film Elf.
- 1965 – Andy Williams – Merry Christmas
- 1978 – The Carpenters – Christmas Portrait
- 1983 – Amy Grant – A Christmas Album
- 1987 – Air Supply – The Christmas Album
- 1992 – Debbie Gibson - A Very Special Christmas 2
- 1996 - Spice Girls – 2 Become 1 single and Jack Frost soundtrack
- 1998 – Squirrel Nut Zippers – Christmas Caravan
- 2002 – S Club Juniors – Puppy Love / Sleigh Ride
- 2012 – Sufjan Stevens released a version of the song on "Let It Snow", the ninth volume of his series of Christmas EPs, included among Vols. 6-10 in the Silver & Gold box set. Stevens uses several different gadgets to make sounds, reminiscent of the style of Spike Jones, who recorded the song in 1956.
- 2020 – Tori Kelly – A Tori Kelly Christmas
- 2022 – Lindsey Stirling – Snow Waltz
- 2023 – Seth MacFarlane and Elizabeth Gillies released a version of the song.
- 2024 – The Philly Specials featuring Immanuel Wilkins – A Philly Special Christmas Party
- 2025 – jschlatt – A Very 1999 Christmas (Deluxe)

=== Mariah Carey version ===
"Sleigh Ride"

Song by Mariah Carey

from the album Mariah Carey's Magical Christmas Special (Apple TV+ Original Soundtrack)
- Released: December 4, 2020
- Recorded: 2020
- Genre: Christmas
- Length: 2:39
- Label: Legacy; Sony Music
- Songwriters: Leroy Anderson; Mitchell Parish
- Producers: Mariah Carey; Daniel Moore II; Marc Shaiman; Scott M. Riesett; Tremaine "Six7" Williams

In 2020, American singer-songwriter Mariah Carey recorded a cover of "Sleigh Ride" for her second soundtrack album, Mariah Carey's Magical Christmas Special (2020).

==== Charts ====
Chart (2020)	Peak position
Hungary (Single Top 40)	25
US R&B/Hip-Hop Digital Songs (Billboard)	25

=== Ella Fitzgerald version ===
==== Charts ====
Chart (2020–2026)	Peak position
Global 200 (Billboard)	138
Portugal (AFP)	162
UK Streaming Chart (OCC)	93

==== Certifications ====
Region	Certification	Certified units/sales
United Kingdom (BPI)	Silver	200,000^{‡}
^{‡} Sales+streaming figures based on certification alone.

=== Relient K version ===
"Sleigh Ride"

Song by Relient K

from the album Let It Snow, Baby... Let It Reindeer
- Released: October 23, 2007
- Genre: Christmas; punk
- Length: 3:32
- Label: Gotee
- Songwriters: Leroy Anderson; Mitchell Parish
- Producers: Mark Lee Townsend; Matt Thiessen

Music video
- "Sleigh Ride" on YouTube

In 2007, American rock band Relient K recorded a cover of "Sleigh Ride" for their second Christmas album, Let It Snow, Baby... Let It Reindeer. The group performed the song on The Tonight Show with Jay Leno on December 16, 2008. Guitarist Matt Hoopes described their version as having a "jazzy, '50s, dancy kind of feel to it." The band's video for the song was released on November 10, 2008, made by Funny Pages Productions and directed by Rob Corley and Tom Bancroft. It was posted on MTV on December 8. It is an animated video, illustrated by Chris Kennet.

==== Charts ====
Chart (2014–2015)	Peak position
US Christian Streaming Songs (Billboard)	16
