= The Symbols =

- Origin: Essex, England
- Genres: Pop, beat
- Years active: 1965–1974
- Labels: Bell, Columbia, Crystal, President Records
- Past members: John Milton; Mick Clarke; Shaun Corrigan; Clive Graham; Joe Baccini; Chas Wade; Adrian Gurvitz; Phil Chesterton; Trevor Mee; Brian Gill; Dave Guscott

The Symbols were an English pop music band, who were founded in 1965 and lasted until 1974. They had two hits on the UK Singles Chart with "Bye Bye Baby" (1967), and "(The Best Part of) Breaking Up" (1968).

== Career ==
The group began in the early 1960s as Johnny Milton and the Condors, and they released two singles, including "Cry Baby" on the Fontana label. In 1965, they changed their name to the Symbols, and their initial line-up included John Milton (vocals), Mick Clarke (bass guitar), Shaun Corrigan (lead guitar) and Clive Graham (drums). Their debut single under the Symbols name was produced by Mickie Most. However, "One Fine Girl", was a commercial failure. The follow-up single was their cover version of "Why Do Fools Fall in Love", but after lack of mainstream success, by 1966 they were released from their recording contract. They had been regular performers at the California Ballroom, Dunstable, Bedfordshire.

Clarke left them to join the Tremeloes and was replaced on bass by John Bachini (aka John Baccini), then Adrian Gurvitz. Clarke introduced the Tremeloes to a track that the Symbols had played in their repertoire, "Silence is Golden". Clarke later returned to the Symbols, who experienced other changes in their line-up with John Bachini (bass and vocals) who left to join the Robb Storme Group - who later changed their name to the Orange Bicycle, and Chas Wade (drums), variously playing with the group.

Edward Kassner launched President Records in the UK in 1966, and signed the Symbols, initially to cover a US hit, "See You in September". The gamble did not work as the record failed to reach the UK chart. However, Kassner persisted in trying cover versions of previously successful US releases, and the Symbols next effort, "Bye Bye Baby", a version of the Four Seasons' song, spent three weeks in the UK chart in August 1967, peaking at number 44. The song found more lasting notability in the UK when the Bay City Rollers reached number 1 in March 1975. The Symbols themselves followed with "(The Best Part of) Breaking Up", originally recorded by the Ronettes, which was their second and final UK chart success. It reached number 25 in early 1968, spending twelve weeks in the chart. Subsequent singles failed to chart.

In late 1972, Corrigan was replaced on guitar by Trevor Mee, who had resigned from the Send, Surrey, band Unicorn, just before David Gilmour became interested in them and started to produce them. Clive Graham, who was known in the band as Cleve Gooham because his name was mis-spelled on a hotel reservation form, was replaced by Phil Chesterton. Corrigan and Graham went on to form another version of the Symbols. At the beginning of 1973, Mee left the band and was replaced by Brian Gill. The Symbols continued to play colleges, clubs and the Northern cabaret circuit, and did a summer season on the Costa Dorada, Spain. In 1973, they worked on what would probably have been a single called 'Something Crazy's Happening', written by Phil Chesterton, had the band not been overtaken by events. At the end of 1973, Clarke left to join the Rubettes and was replaced by Dave Guscott on bass. At the beginning of 1974 Milton left to join Sparrow and, despite him being the last original member, attempts were made to keep the band going by Chesterton, Gill and Dave Guscott. A suitable singer could not be found, they disbanded. The other Symbols band formed by Corrigan and Graham, however, carried on working for a while.

They sang on the "Canadian Sunset" single which was released in 1975 on Crystal CR 7021. It was composed by E. Heywood and N. Gimbel.

== Band members ==
- John Milton – vocalist
- Mick Clarke (born Michael William Clarke, 10 August 1946, Grimsby, Lincolnshire, England) – bassist / vocalist
- Shaun Corrigan – guitarist
- Clive Graham – drummer
- John Bachini – bassist, vocalist
- Chas Wade – drummer
- Adrian Gurvitz – bass
- Trevor Mee – guitar
- Phil Chesterton – drums
- Brian Gill – guitar
- Dave Guscott – bass

== Discography ==
=== Chart singles ===
Year	Title Songwriters	UK Singles Chart
1967	"Bye Bye Baby" (Bob Crewe / Bob Gaudio)	Number 44
1968	"(The Best Part of) Breaking Up" (Phil Spector / Peter Andreoli / Vince Poncia)	Number 25

=== Compilation albums ===
Year	Title
2004	The Best Part of the Symbols: The President Recordings 1966–1968
