= Steed Records =

- Founded: 1967
- Founder: Jeff Barry
- Distributor(s): Dot Records, Famous Music Group
- Genre: Bubblegum pop

Steed Records was a record label founded by songwriter-record producer Jeff Barry in 1967 in New York City. The label was active until 1971. It was first distributed by Dot Records, then by Gulf+Western's Famous Music Group after it absorbed Dot.

Steed's main artist was singer-songwriter Andy Kim, whose biggest hit for the label was "Baby, I Love You" (co-written and produced by Barry) in 1969. Other artists on the label included Robin McNamara ("Lay a Little Lovin' On Me") and The Illusion ("Did You See Her Eyes"). Other Steed acts included Louis St. Louis and Jacqueline Carol (St. Louis would later produce the "Grease" and "Grease II" soundtracks), The Playhouse, Hank Shifter, Keepers of the Light featuring Alzo Fronte (who also recorded as Alzo + Uddin) and The Rich Kids featuring Danny Belline. Most of Steed's recording sessions took place at Century Sound Studios in NYC. Jeff Barry and Andy Kim's songwriting partnership was a cornerstone of the label's fortunes. Steed Records rode the wave of bubblegum pop in the late Sixties and early Seventies (although many of its releases were not bubblegum). When musical trends changed, Steed's sales fell off. Paramount Records took over the label with Famous Music taking over distribution.

Jeff Barry discontinued Steed Records when he relocated to California in 1971. Kim's last two hits, "Rock Me Gently" and "Fire, Baby, I'm on Fire", appeared on Capitol Records in 1974. The Steed catalogue is today controlled by Universal Music Group.

== See also ==
- List of record labels
