= Baby, I Love You =

1963 single by the Ronettes

Single by the Ronettes

from the album Presenting the Fabulous Ronettes
- B-side: "Miss Joan And Mr. Sam"
- Released: November 1963
- Studio: Gold Star, Los Angeles
- Genre: Pop
- Length: 2:50
- Label: Philles
- Songwriters: Phil Spector; Jeff Barry; Ellie Greenwich
- Producer: Phil Spector

The Ronettes singles chronology
"Be My Baby" (1963)	"Baby, I Love You" (1963)	"(The Best Part of) Breakin' Up" (1964)

Music video
- "Baby I Love You" on YouTube

"Baby, I Love You" is a song originally recorded by the Ronettes in 1963 and released on their debut album Presenting the Fabulous Ronettes (1964). The song was written by Jeff Barry, Ellie Greenwich, and Phil Spector, and produced by Spector.

Released in November 1963, the single reached number 24 on both the US Billboard Hot 100 and Cashbox Top 100 charts, and peaked at number 11 on the UK Singles Chart. Billboard ranked the song as number 56 on their list of 100 Greatest Girl Group Songs of All Time.

== Original recording ==
After their lack of success under contract to Colpix Records between 1961 and 1963, the Ronettes ended their Colpix contract and signed with Phil Spector's Philles Records in early 1963. During their first few months with Phil Spector, the Ronettes achieved mainstream success with the release of "Be My Baby" in August 1963, which climbed to number two on the US Billboard Hot 100 and peaked at number one on the Cashbox Hot 100. It was the success of "Be My Baby" which had Spector eager to do a follow-up for the Ronettes in the fall of 1963.

However, a problem arose when the Ronettes were booked to appear on Dick Clark's "Caravan of Stars" tour across the country. Phil Spector decided to keep lead singer Ronnie Bennett in California to record "Baby, I Love You" while the other two Ronettes, Estelle Bennett and Nedra Talley, went out on the tour with Dick Clark. Ronnie's cousin, Elaine, took her place on the tour while Ronnie recorded the song at Gold Star Studios in Los Angeles. Since the other Ronettes were unavailable for recording, Spector used Sonny Bono, Darlene Love, and Cher to complete the backing vocals. The song also featured Leon Russell on piano. "Baby, I Love You" peaked at number 11 in the UK during January 1964, at a time when the Ronettes were touring the UK as the support act to the Rolling Stones.

Billboard described the song as a "swinging, glandular side that should soar", stating it has the "big Philadelphia sound". Cash Box described it as a "big-sounding mashed potatoes stomp’er that the gals and their instrumental support deliver in ultra-commercial manner", also calling it a "sensational new entry". The song was featured on the album Presenting the Fabulous Ronettes, which was released at the end of 1964.

=== Personnel ===
- Lead vocals by Ronnie Bennett
- Background vocals by Cher, Sonny Bono, and the Blossoms (Darlene Love, Fanita James, and Gracia Nitzsche)
- Instrumentation by the Wrecking Crew

== Chart history ==
Chart (1964)	Peak position
U.S. Billboard Hot 100	24
US Cashbox Top 50 in R&B Loacations	6
U.S. Cashbox Hot 100	24
UK Singles Chart (Official Charts Company)	11

== Andy Kim version ==
"Baby, I Love You"

Single by Andy Kim

from the album Baby I Love You
- B-side: "Gee Girl"
- Released: May 1969
- Genre: Pop rock
- Length: 2:56
- Label: Steed
- Songwriters: Phil Spector; Jeff Barry; Ellie Greenwich
- Producer: Jeff Barry

Andy Kim singles chronology
"Tricia Tell Your Daddy" (1969)	"Baby, I Love You" (1969)	"So Good Together" (1969)

Andy Kim recorded the song for Jeff Barry's record label Steed Records on his album Baby I Love You (1969). Kim's version became a US Top Ten hit, reaching number nine in 1969 and earned a gold record.

=== Chart history ===
==== Weekly charts ====
Chart (1969)	Peak position
Australia KMR	15
Canada RPM Top Singles	1
Canada RPM Adult Contemporary	24
New Zealand (Listener)	16
US Billboard Hot 100	9
US Billboard Adult Contemporary	31
US Cash Box Top 100	6

==== Year-end charts ====
Chart (1969)	Rank
Canada RPM Top Singles	11
US Billboard Hot 100	28
US Cash Box	44

== Certifications ==
Certifications for "Baby, I Love You"
Region	Certification	Certified units/sales
United States (RIAA)	Gold	1,000,000^{^}
^{^} Shipments figures based on certification alone.

== Ramones version ==
"Baby, I Love You"
- UK 7" single

Single by Ramones

from the album End of the Century
- B-side: "High Risk Insurance"
- Released: January 1980
- Recorded: 1979
- Length: 3:47
- Label: Sire
- Songwriters: Phil Spector; Jeff Barry; Ellie Greenwich
- Producer: Phil Spector

Ramones singles chronology
"Rock 'n' Roll High School" (1979)	"Baby, I Love You" (1980)	"Danny Says" (1980)

Official audio
- "Baby, I Love You" on YouTube

Phil Spector produced the Ramones' cover version of the song which appeared on their album, End of the Century (1980). The single reached number eight in the UK Singles Chart in 1980, their biggest UK top-ten hit.

=== Background and reception ===
In an incident at Spector's house, the producer held the Ramones hostage at gunpoint and made them listen to him play "Baby, I Love You" until 4:30 in the morning. Spector insisted that the Ramones recorded a cover of the song and got Joey Ramone to sing it with some session musicians, as none of the other members of the Ramones would play on it. Joey has said that "it didn't sound anything like the Ramones" and he hated the song. Mickey Leigh (Joey's brother) has said "it made me almost embarrassed", "with its gooey string section arrangement that sounded right out of Redbone's "Come and Get Your Love"".

Kurt Loder for the Rolling Stone described it as a "sludged-out rehash of the Ronettes antiquity" that was "a bad idea to begin with, and one that’s further burdened by the cheesiest string arrangement this side of the Longines Symphonette". Reviewing End of the Century retrospectively for Pitchfork, Evan Minsker wrote that "even with a full understanding of End of the Century’s context, “Baby, I Love You” is jarring" and "is a museum piece—a pound-for-pound attempt to relive Spector’s golden years".

Ramones' version also appears in Sofia Coppola's 2023 film Priscilla.

=== Charts ===
Chart (1980)	Peak position
Belgium (Ultratop 50 Flanders)	25
Ireland (IRMA)	5
Italy (Musica e dischi)	15
UK Singles (Official Charts)	8

== Dave Edmunds version ==
The version by Welsh guitarist Dave Edmunds reached number 8 in the UK singles chart in March 1973.
