= Andy Kim (album) =

Studio album by Andy Kim
- Released: 1974
- Genre: Rock
- Label: Capitol Records 11318
- Producer: Andy Kim

Andy Kim chronology
Andy Kim (Uni Records) (1973)	Andy Kim (1974)	I Forgot to Mention (2004)

Professional ratings
Review scores
Source	Rating
Allmusic	3/5 stars

Andy Kim is a self-titled album released by Canadian singer Andy Kim on Capitol Records.

The single "Rock Me Gently" hit No. 1 in the US and Canada, No. 2 in the UK, and No. 33 in West Germany. The single "Fire, Baby I'm on Fire" peaked at No. 15 in Canada and No. 28 on the US pop chart. The album reached No. 13 in Canada and No. 21 on the Billboard Top LPs chart.

== Track listing ==
All songs written by Andy Kim.

1. "Rock Me Gently"
2. "Good Good Mornin'"
3. "Hang Up Those Rock 'N Roll Shoes"
4. "Song I Can Sing Ya"
5. "And I Will Sing You to Sleep"
6. "Fire, Baby I'm On Fire"
7. "Here Comes The Mornin'"
8. "You Are My Everything"
9. "Sunshine"
10. "Rock Me Gently - Part II"

== Charts ==
Chart (1974)	Peak position
Canada RPM (magazine)	13
US Billboard Top LPs & Tape	21

Singles

Year	Single	Chart	Position
1974	"Rock Me Gently"	Canada	1
1974	"Rock Me Gently"	UK	2
1974	"Rock Me Gently"	US Hot 100	1
1974	"Rock Me Gently"	US AC	40
1974	"Rock Me Gently"	West Germany	33
1974	"Fire, Baby I'm on Fire"	Canada	15
1974	"Fire, Baby I'm on Fire"	US Hot 100	28
