= Do I Love You? (The Ronettes song) =

Single by the Ronettes

from the album Presenting the Fabulous Ronettes
- B-side: "Bebe and Susu"
- Released: June 1964
- Genre: Pop
- Length: 2:56
- Label: Philles
- Songwriters: Phil Spector; Pete Andreoli; Vini Poncia
- Producer: Phil Spector

The Ronettes singles chronology
"(The Best Part of) Breakin' Up" (1964)	"Do I Love You?" (1964)	"Walking in the Rain" (1964)

"Do I Love You?" is a song written by Phil Spector, Pete Andreoli and Vini Poncia. It was recorded by American girl group the Ronettes in 1964 and released on their debut album Presenting the Fabulous Ronettes. The B side, "Bebe and Susu", is an instrumental non-album track.

Cash Box described it as "a pulsating, big-sounding romancer...that the gals and the Jack Nitzsche-led instrumentalists wax with money-making enthusiasm." Matthew Greenwald of AllMusic stated that it is lyrically "about preteen romance and devotion" built around "a funky and elegant guitar/keyboard riff". The song has been covered by the bands The Symbols, Jay and the Americans, and Flamin' Groovies.

== Release ==
The song reached number 11 on Cashbox's "Top 50 in R&B Locations" on July 18, 1964, their fourth highest charting hit on a national R&B chart. It peaked at number 34 on the U.S. Billboard Hot 100 on August 1, 1964, becoming the group's fourth consecutive top forty hit on the chart and faring slightly better than their previous single "(The Best Part of) Breakin' Up". It also reached number 35 on the UK Singles Chart and stayed on the chart for four weeks.

== Charts ==
Chart (1964)	Peak position
Canada Top Singles (RPM)	14
UK Singles (Official Charts)	35
US Billboard Hot 100	34
US Cash Box	36
