= Rock Me Gently (Andy Kim song) =

1974 single by Andy Kim

Single by Andy Kim

from the album Andy Kim
- B-side: "Rock Me Gently" (instrumental)
- Released: June 22, 1974
- Genre: Pop rock; proto-disco
- Length: 3:24
- Label: Capitol Records
- Songwriter: Andy Kim
- Producer: Andy Kim

Andy Kim singles chronology
"Oh What a Day" (1972)	"Rock Me Gently" (1974)	"Fire, Baby I'm on Fire" (1974)

"Rock Me Gently" is a song by Andy Kim, released as a single in 1974.

The Canadian singer, who charted several hits from 1968 to 1971, had not had a top 100 single since September 1971, and had been without a record label since early 1973. Nevertheless, he said in a 1974 interview, "I never mentally admitted defeat in spite of three years off the charts." He formed his own label, Ice Records, and personally financed the recording session that produced "Rock Me Gently". He could afford to record only two sides, and deciding the second side was good enough to be an A-side, he put an instrumental of "Rock Me Gently" on its B-side.

The single impressed Capitol Records executives, who signed Kim to a deal. "Rock Me Gently" debuted on the Hot 100 on June 22, 1974, and took 14 weeks to reach No. 1 on September 28. It also rose to No. 2 on the UK Singles Chart and No. 10 in Ireland, and remains his only charting song in either the UK or Ireland. Even the instrumental B-side received substantial airplay on R&B stations. It would be Kim's last top 10 hit in either country.

== Personnel ==
- Backing Vocals - Carol Carmichael And Group
- Bass - Max Bennett
- Concertmaster - Sid Sharp
- Conductor - Michael Omartian
- Drums - Ed Greene
- Guitars - Andy Kim, Ben Benay, Dean Parks, Larry Carlton
- Keyboards - Michael Omartian
- Percussion - Gary Coleman

== Chart performance ==
=== Weekly charts ===
Chart (1974)	Peak position
Australia KMR	31
Canada RPM	1
Germany	33
Ireland	10
South Africa (Springbok)	3
UK	2
U.S. Billboard Hot 100	1
U.S. Billboard Adult Contemporary	40
U.S. Cash Box Top 100	1

=== Year-end charts ===
Chart (1974)	Rank
Canada	23
U.S. Billboard Hot 100	29
U.S. Cash Box	4

== Certifications ==
Region	Certification	Certified units/sales
United States (RIAA)	Gold	1,000,000^{^}
^{^} Shipments figures based on certification alone.

== Later uses ==
Part of the song was used in a 1970s UK TV commercial for Lever Brothers' Jif cleaning cream, using the lyric "When Jif’s your cleaner / Tough dirt goes / Away so gently / And it shows / Your home has never been loved like this before".

The song resurfaced in 2007 in a television commercial for Jeep Liberty. It was also played at the end (and titles) of season 4 finale and in the season 5 premiere of the TV show Ray Donovan.

The song appears in season 3, episode 3 of Sex Education.

Part of the songs chorus was sampled by electronic music producer Mint Royale on the track Take It Easy from their 1999 debut album On The Ropes.

== Michelle Wright version ==
"Rock Me Gently"

Single by Michelle Wright

from the album Do Right by Me
- Released: 1989
- Genre: Country
- Length: 3:31
- Label: Savannah
- Songwriter: Andy Kim
- Producers: Steve Bogard; Rick Giles

Michelle Wright singles chronology
"I Wish I Were Only Lonely" (1989)	"Rock Me Gently" (1989)	"I Don't Want to Wonder" (1989)

In 1989, Canadian country singer Michelle Wright released a version as a single on her debut album, Do Right By Me. It reached No. 7 on the Canadian RPM country singles chart.

=== Chart performance ===
Chart (1989)	Peak position
Canada Country Singles (RPM)	7

=== Year-end charts ===
Chart (1989)	Position
Canada Country Tracks (RPM)	57

== Other Covers ==
The song was covered by the Trans-Canada Highwaymen for their 2023 album, Explosive Hits Vol. 1.

== See also ==
List of Billboard Hot 100 number-one singles of 1974
