= The Ronettes =

American girl group (1959–67; 1973–74)

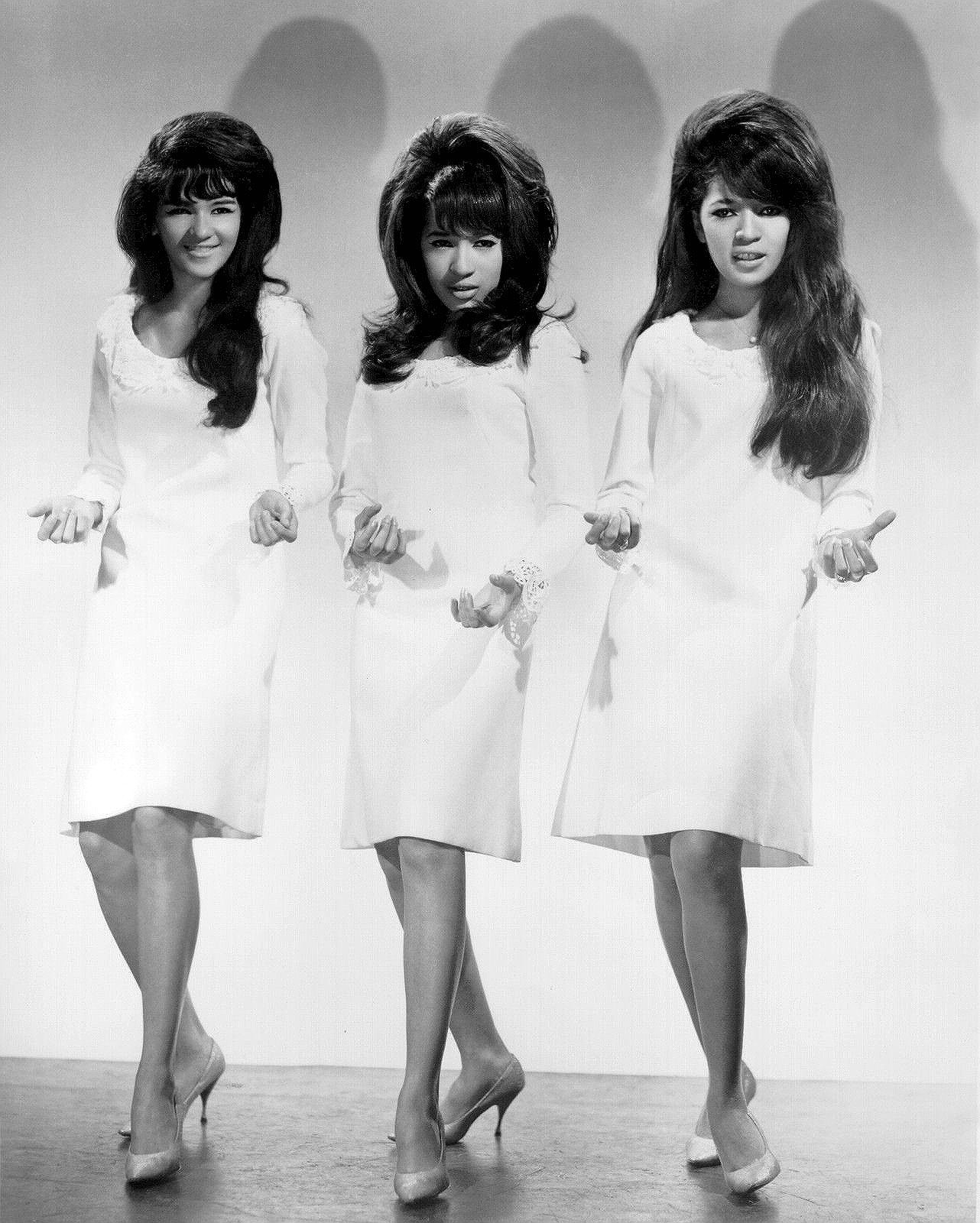
- The Ronettes in 1966; From left to right: Nedra Talley, Ronnie Spector and Estelle Bennett

Background information
- Also known as: The Darling Sisters; Ronnie and the Ronettes
- Origin: New York City, U.S.
- Genres: R&B; pop; soul; doo-wop
- Years active: 1959–1967; 1973–1974
- Labels: Colpix; Philles
- Past members: Ronnie Spector; Estelle Bennett; Nedra Talley; Elaine Mayes; Chip Fields; Denise Edwards; Diane Linton; Tricia Scotti

The Ronettes (/rɒnˈnɛts/ ron-NETS) were an American girl group from Washington Heights, Manhattan, New York City. The group consisted of the lead singer Veronica Bennett (later known as Ronnie Spector), her older sister Estelle Bennett, and their cousin Nedra Talley. They had sung together since they were teenagers, then known as "The Darling Sisters". Signed first by Colpix Records in 1961, they moved to Phil Spector's Philles Records in March 1963 and changed their name to "The Ronettes".

The Ronettes placed nine songs on the Billboard Hot 100, six of which became Top 40 hits. Among their hit songs are "Be My Baby", which peaked at No. 2, their only contemporary top 10 hit, "Baby, I Love You", "(The Best Part of) Breakin' Up" and "Walking in the Rain". In 1964, the group released their only studio album, Presenting the Fabulous Ronettes featuring Veronica. That year, the Rolling Stones were their opening act when they toured the UK. The Ronettes opened for the Beatles on their 1966 US tour, becoming the only girl group to tour with them, before splitting up in 1967. In the 1970s, the group was briefly revived as Ronnie Spector and the Ronettes. Veronica Bennett married Phil Spector in 1968.

Their song "Be My Baby" was inducted into the Grammy Hall of Fame in 1999. Rolling Stone ranked their album Presenting the Fabulous Ronettes Featuring Veronica No. 422 on its list of The 500 Greatest Albums of All Time. The Ronettes were inducted into the Vocal Group Hall of Fame in 2004, and into the Rock and Roll Hall of Fame in 2007. The group also holds the record for the longest gap between top-ten hits in Billboard history, just over 58 years. With the death of Nedra Talley in April 2026, all original members of the group have died.

== History ==
=== Formation and early years ===
The Ronettes began as a family act where the girls grew up in Washington Heights, Manhattan. According to Nedra Talley, they started singing during childhood visits to their grandmother's home. "Estelle and Veronica are sisters," she said in a later interview. "I'm their cousin. Our mothers are sisters. We came out of a family that, on Saturday nights, home for us was at our grandmother's, entertaining each other." The Bennetts' mother was African American and Cherokee; their father was Irish-American. Their cousin, Talley, was African American, Cherokee and Puerto Rican. The trio also had a great-grandfather who was Chinese. "By the time I was eight, I was already working up whole numbers for our family's little weekend shows," Ronnie Spector later recalled. "Then Estelle would get up onstage and do a song, or she'd join Nedra or my cousin Elaine and me in a number we'd worked out in three-part harmony."

Furthering their interest in show business, Estelle was enrolled at Startime, a popular dancing school in the 1950s, while Ronnie became fascinated with Frankie Lymon and the Teenagers. In 1957, Ronnie formed the group later known as the Ronettes. Ronnie, her sister Estelle, and their cousins Nedra, Diane, and Elaine learned how to perfect their harmonies at their grandmother's house, and became proficient at songs such as "Goodnight Sweetheart" and "Red Red Robin". Emulating Frankie Lymon and the Teenagers, the girls added their male cousin Ira to the group and signed up for a Wednesday night amateur show at the Apollo Theater run by a friend of Ronnie and Estelle's mother. The show started out as a disaster; when the house band started playing Frankie Lymon's "Why Do Fools Fall in Love", Ira did not sing a word, so Ronnie took over. "I strutted out across the stage, singing as loud as I could," Ronnie later recalled. "When I finally heard a few hands of scattered applause, I sang even louder. That brought a little more applause, which was all I needed."

After their night at the Apollo, Ira, Elaine, and Diane left the group. After the curious renaming of the group to "Ronnie and the Relatives", Ronnie, Estelle, and Nedra began taking singing lessons two afternoons per week. Appearing at local bar mitzvahs and sock hops, they met Phil Halikus, who introduced them to Colpix Records producer Stu Phillips. According to Ronnie, Phillips played the piano while the women auditioned for him, singing "What's So Sweet About Sweet Sixteen". The audition was successful, and the group was brought into the studio in June 1961 and recorded four tracks: "I Want a Boy", "What's So Sweet About Sweet Sixteen", "I'm Gonna Quit While I'm Ahead", and "My Guiding Angel". Colpix released "I Want a Boy" in August 1961 and "I'm Gonna Quit While I'm Ahead" in January 1962, the first singles credited to Ronnie and the Relatives.

While both singles failed to chart on the Billboard Top 100, fate intervened in advancing the group's success. A fortuitous case of mistaken identity led to Ronnie and the Relatives making their debut – as dancers rather than a singing act – at New York City's hip Peppermint Lounge in 1961. It was the height of the twist craze, and under-aged Nedra and Ronnie disguised themselves to get in. The girls' mothers showed them how to put on make-up and fix their hair to make them look at least 23. When they arrived outside the club, its manager mistook Ronnie, Estelle, and Nedra for the trio supposed to dance behind house band Joey Dee and the Starliters for the evening. He led them in and put them onstage to perform in their place. During the show, Starliter David Brigati even handed the mike over to Ronnie when she started to sing Ray Charles' "What'd I Say". Soon afterward, Ronnie and the Relatives became a permanent act at The Peppermint Lounge, each earning $10 per night to dance the twist and usually sing a song at some point in the show.

Ronnie and the Relatives soon became "The Ronettes". Colpix issued the first two singles credited to the Ronettes, "Silhouettes" and a re-issue of "I'm Gonna Quit While I'm Ahead", on its May label in April and June 1962, respectively. Both singles disappointingly failed to chart. Later that year, they were flown to Miami to open a Florida branch of The Peppermint Lounge. After their performance at the Miami gala, radio host Murray the K came backstage and introduced himself to them. He asked the women to begin appearing at his shows at The Brooklyn Fox in New York. They agreed, taking the Fox stage in 1962 and completing a transition from Murray the K's "Dancing Girls", to back-up singing for other acts, to performing as the Ronettes before year's end. It was during this time that the women evolved their iconic look, wearing ever more exaggerated eye make-up while teasing their hair to impossible proportions. "We'd look pretty wild by the time we got out onstage," Ronnie later recalled, "and the kids loved it." Colpix's May label issued a final single by the Ronettes in March 1963. When "Good Girls" failed to chart, the women decided to look elsewhere for studio work.

=== Rise to prominence with Phil Spector ===
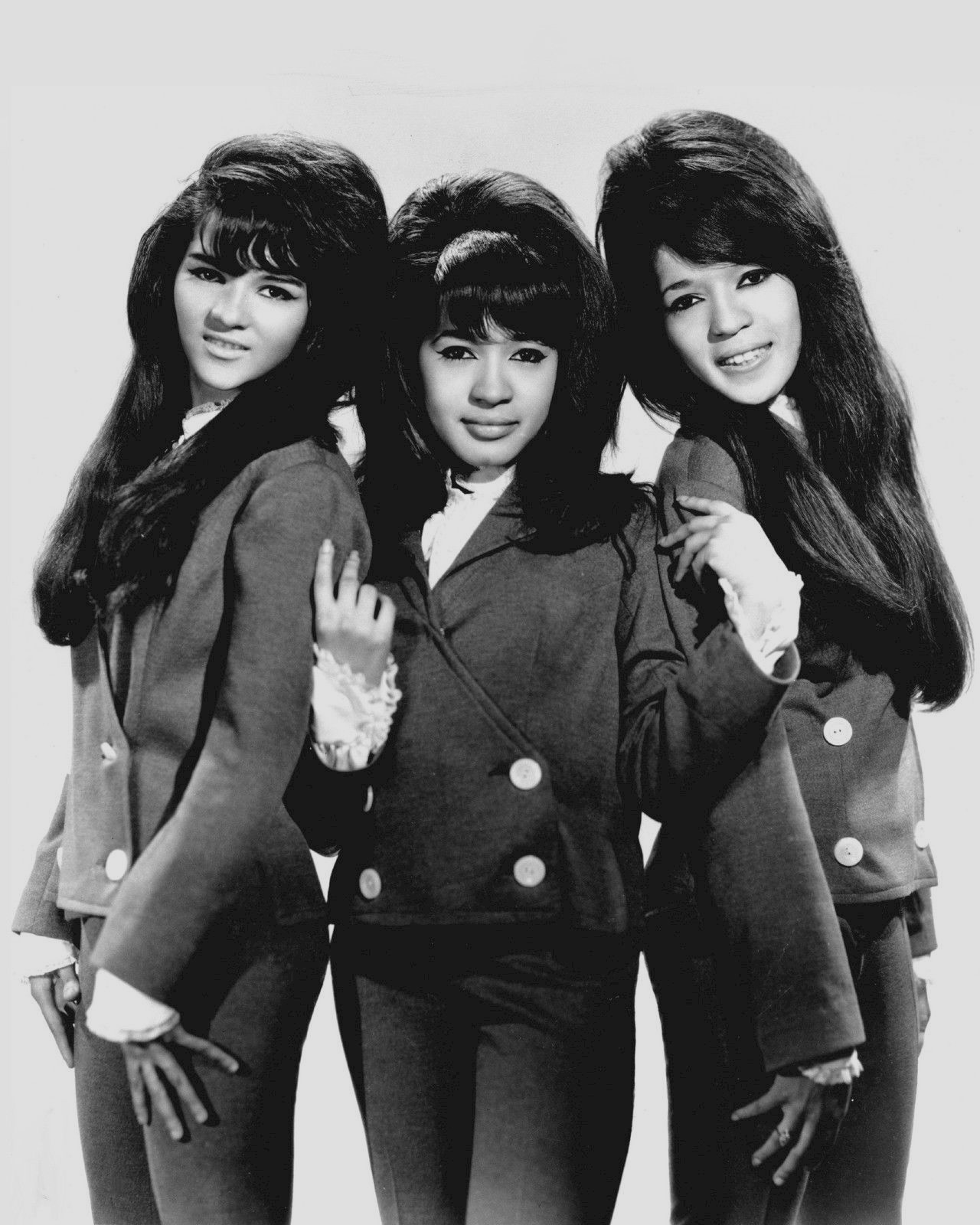
The Ronettes in 1966

In early 1963, frustrated with Colpix Records and the group's lack of success, sister Estelle called producer Phil Spector and told him the Ronettes would like to audition for him. Spector met the women soon after at Mira Sound Studios in New York City. Later, Spector told Ronnie that he had seen them at The Brooklyn Fox several times and was impressed with their performances. At the audition, when the group began singing "Why Do Fools Fall in Love", Spector jumped from his seat and shouted, "That's it! That's it! That's the voice I've been looking for!"

Spector decided to sign the group; originally, he wanted to sign Ronnie as a solo act, until her mother told him he would sign the Ronettes as a group or there would be no deal. Spector agreed, instructing Ronnie's mother to inform Colpix Records that the women had "given up" on show business so the studio would release their contract. By March 1963, the group was officially signed to Spector's Philles Records.

The first song the Ronettes rehearsed and recorded with Spector was written by Spector, Jeff Barry, and Ellie Greenwich, "Why Don't They Let Us Fall in Love". They brought the women out to California to make the record, but, once it was completed, Spector declined to release it. The Ronettes recorded more songs for Spector, including covers of "The Twist", "The Wah-Watusi" (lead vocals by Nedra), "Mashed Potato Time", and "Hot Pastrami". These four songs were released, but were credited to the Crystals on their 1963 Philles LP The Crystals Sing Their Greatest Hits, Volume 1.

After having been denied a release of their song as well as having credit for their next four recordings go to another group, the Ronettes went to work on the Phil Spector/Jeff Barry/Ellie Greenwich song "Be My Baby". The Ronettes recorded "Be My Baby" in July 1963, and it was released by August. "Be My Baby" was a smash record for the Ronettes. Radio stations played the song throughout fall 1963, and the Ronettes were invited to tour the country with Dick Clark on his "Caravan of Stars" tour. "Be My Baby" inspired a legion of Ronettes fans, including Brian Wilson of the Beach Boys, who clearly intended "Don't Worry Baby" as an homage to the group. The song became a Top 10 hit and peaked at number 2 on the Billboard Top 100. "Our lives were turned upside down," Ronnie later recalled. "All the things I'd ever dreamed about were finally coming true."

"Be My Baby" was the first recording by Cher, who performed back-up vocals with Estelle, Nedra, and Sonny Bono. As the girlfriend of Bono, who was working for Phil Spector at the time, Cher was asked to join the back-up singers when one was a no-show. "'Be My Baby' was the first record I ever sang on," Cher later wrote. "I went out and stood in front of this big speaker and sang 'be my, be my baby' with the Ronettes and all these other singers." After "Be My Baby", Cher became a permanent back-up singer on recordings by the Ronettes, as well as other songs Phil Spector produced until "You've Lost That Lovin' Feelin'".

After the overnight success of their first Phil Spector single, Spector was eager to do a follow-up with the Ronettes. He wrote "Baby, I Love You", again with Jeff Barry and Ellie Greenwich, and urged the Ronettes to leave New York for California to record the song at Gold Star Studios. A problem arose when the Ronettes were scheduled to leave for Dick Clark's "Caravan of Stars" tour across the United States. In lieu of having the Ronettes skip the Dick Clark tour, Spector decided Estelle and Nedra would do the tour with cousin Elaine, a former member of the group. Ronnie left for California to record "Baby, I Love You" with Darlene Love, Cher, and Sonny Bono subbing for Estelle and Nedra on back-up vocals. "Baby, I Love You" had an even denser arrangement, featuring Leon Russell on piano. The song was recorded in the early fall of 1963 and released in November that year. It was slightly less successful than "Be My Baby" on the charts, reaching number 24 Pop, number 6 R&B in the United States and number 11 in the United Kingdom.

All three Ronettes, along with every other artist who was signed with Phil Spector in 1963, were featured on the Christmas LP A Christmas Gift for You from Phil Spector. For this album, the Ronettes recorded three songs: "I Saw Mommy Kissing Santa Claus", "Frosty the Snowman", and "Sleigh Ride". All artists sang on the album's finale, "Silent Night", which opened with a spoken message from Phil Spector, wishing a Merry Christmas and thanking everyone for supporting the cooperative artists.

In his desire for absolute perfection on the album, Spector pushed his artists to belt out their lyrics as powerfully as they could. "The Christmas album was the one where I'd thought I'd lost it mentally." Nedra later said. "I heard the parts. I swore I'd put them down, but they said it wasn't on the tape."

The album was released on the day President Kennedy was assassinated. It was not a success upon its initial release but it was re-released by Apple Records in 1972 and reached No. 6 on Billboard's list of Christmas Albums that year.

In January 1964, the Ronettes left for their first tour of the UK, where they made a strong impact from the very beginning. "We must have been quite a sight in the Heathrow waiting room," Ronnie Spector later recalled, "three black American girls sitting with their legs all crossed the same way, our three identical, enormous hairdos piled a foot or so over our heads. When our young chaperon finally showed up, he was all smiles."

On their first night in the UK, the women attended a party at Tony Hall's house where they met the Beatles. After meeting, Ronnie and John Lennon quickly became friends and Estelle dated George Harrison. But for Ronnie, one of the biggest thrills was meeting Keith Richards of the Rolling Stones, who were the opening act for the Ronettes on their UK tour. The feeling was mutually shared by Richards, who wrote of his relationship with Ronnie: "The first time I ever went to heaven was when I awoke with Ronnie (later Spector!) Bennett asleep with a smile on her face. We were kids. It doesn't get any better than that."

When the women returned home from their British tour, they went right back into the studio to record "Keep on Dancing" and "Girls Can Tell", two songs written by Jeff Barry, Ellie Greenwich and Phil Spector. The group's recording of "Keep on Dancing" is notable because it features Ronnie and Nedra singing in unison, but Spector refused to release the single. Around this time, the Crystals also recorded a version of "Girls Can Tell", which also went unreleased.

"(The Best Part of) Breakin' Up" was subsequently recorded by the Ronettes. According to Ronnie, Spector was especially enthusiastic about the song. "When Phil loved a song as much as he loved '(The Best Part of) Breakin' Up,'" she later wrote, "he could work on it for days without ever getting tired." Released in April 1964, the song did not fare as well as the group's previous two singles, though it did manage to briefly break into the Billboard Top 40. In June 1964, the group's following single, "Do I Love You?", was released, also breaking into the Top 40, beating their previous single by five positions.

As the British Invasion took full force on the American music scene in 1964, the Ronettes were one of the few groups that were able to maintain their relevance. When they toured the UK in January 1964, they had been asked by John Lennon to accompany the Beatles on their flight to America on February 7, 1964, but Spector denied them the opportunity to do so. Instead, throughout 1964, the group appeared on numerous television shows such as Shindig!, American Bandstand, Hullabaloo, and British TV show Ready, Steady, Go! As the popularity of other groups such as the Crystals, the Marvelettes, and the Angels began to wane, that of the Ronettes continued to grow.

In the summer of 1964, Ronnie went into the studio to record her lead on the group's next single, "Walking in the Rain". She later recalled that the writers – Phil Spector, Barry Mann, and Cynthia Weil – were still adjusting the lyrics right up to the minute she recorded it. Ronnie recalled Phil placing headphones on her and telling her to listen closely. "Everything was quiet," she later wrote, "Then all of a sudden I heard a low rumble, like there was thunder coming from every corner of the room." The thunder was used for the introduction and was featured prominently throughout the remainder of the song, the only one of which Ronnie recorded in a single take. "Walking in the Rain" became the group's most successful single since "Be My Baby" (released over a year earlier) and peaked at number 23 on the Billboard Hot 100.

Following the successful release of "Walking in the Rain", Philles Records released the group's first studio album, Presenting the Fabulous Ronettes featuring Veronica, in late 1964. The album proved only to be marginally successful, peaking at number 96 on the Billboard charts, but for the first time Phil Spector publicly promoted lead singer Veronica "Ronnie" Bennett over Estelle Bennett and Nedra Talley. Every Ronettes single after this referred to the group as "The Ronettes featuring Veronica" on the record labels.

=== Decline, final performances and breakup ===
After the success of "Walking in the Rain", the Ronettes' popularity had clearly begun to wane. In February 1965, Philles Records released the group's next single, "Born to Be Together", which only reached number 52 on the Billboard 100. Over the course of the next year, the Ronettes recorded a song catalog which, once completed, Phil Spector refused to release. Many attribute this to his insecurities and growing love for Ronnie. As the popularity of the group rose, their relationship grew deeper, and soon they were living together. Spector allegedly did not want the Ronettes to become too popular, fearing they would one day outshine him, perhaps explaining why he did not release recordings the Ronettes were contractually obligated to make. This allowed the Motown group the Supremes to eclipse them to become the most popular female group of the time.

Some recorded yet unreleased songs include: "Paradise", "Everything Under the Sun", and "I Wish I Never Saw the Sun Shine". All three were later covered by, among others, the Shangri-Las, the Supremes, and Ike & Tina Turner. Spector's choice was to not release the Spector/ Jeff Barry/ Ellie Greenwich song "Chapel of Love", initially recorded by the Ronettes in early 1964. By the time their version finally was released, another recording by the Dixie Cups had gained attention. "We thought it was such a great record that we practically begged [Phil Spector] to put it out," Ronnie Spector later wrote. "Then the Dixie Cups' version came out, and it was a smash! It was so depressing."

In June 1965, the Ronettes' next single, "Is This What I Get For Loving You?", was released, becoming a minor hit, reaching only number 75 on the Billboard 100. However, the song proved popular for TV appearances on Hullabaloo, Hollywood A Go-Go, and Shivaree. The Ronettes failed to achieve another Top 10 hit, while the Supremes scored their fifth consecutive number-one song with "Back in My Arms Again". Some have attributed the decline of their popularity partially to Phil Spector's unenthusiastic promotions of the Ronettes, possibly from insecurities stemming from his intimate relationship with Ronnie.

There were internal problems within the group as well. "You also have to remember that Nedra and Estelle stood in the background while I got to bask in the spotlight," Ronnie later wrote. "I was the one who flew out to California and sang lead on all our records. I was the one deejays wanted to talk to. And I was the one our producer was in love with, which meant I get the preferential treatment in all kinds of other ways which [quite understandably] drove them crazy." "I hated the 'dog-eat-dog' side of show-business," Nedra Talley later commented. "I hated pushing for the next record and the feeling of failure if we didn't get it. There was a continual demand on us to produce that I thought was unfair. My personality didn't like that." Nedra's disdain for show business fueled her choice to marry Scott Ross.

After "Is This What I Get for Loving You?" was released in June 1965, over a year passed before the Ronettes' next single was released. "I Can Hear Music", written by Phil Spector/Jeff Barry/Ellie Greenwich and produced by Barry, was issued in October 1966, barely making it into the Billboard 100 by peaking at number 100 for exactly one week before it fell off the charts. The song was covered by the Beach Boys in 1969 with much greater success.

After "Be My Baby", the Ronettes became headliners at several Murray the K Holiday Shows in New York City and did package tours in the US and England. By late 1965, even without a recent hit, the group continued to make appearances at leading night clubs and on television shows, grace the covers of music magazines, and be featured on The Big TNT Show, a concert film produced by Phil Spector.

In August 1966, the Ronettes joined the bill with the Beatles for a 14-city tour across America. Phil Spector became so enraged when Ronnie expressed a desire to accompany Estelle and Nedra on the tour that Ronnie was forced to remain in California with him while the girls' cousin Elaine, who had previously been in the group, filled her slot on the tour, while Nedra or Estelle assumed the lead vocals on stage. A picture published in the November 1966 issue of Ebony magazine showed Nedra Talley singing lead, while Estelle and Elaine stood behind her singing harmony.

In early 1967, after their tour with the Beatles ended, and "I Can Hear Music" failed to make an impact, the Ronettes left for a tour in West Germany, after which they agreed to break up and go their separate ways. Soon afterward, Nedra Talley married her boyfriend Scott Ross, Ronnie Bennett married Phil Spector, and Estelle Bennett settled down with Joe Dong, a long-time boyfriend.

According to her accounts, Phil Spector kept Ronnie a virtual prisoner in their 23-room mansion in California. He brought her into the studio only once during their marriage. During this session, which took place in early 1969 at A&M Records, she recorded "You Came, You Saw, You Conquered!" The song was released in March 1969, failing to make an impact on radio stations, which were now playing music in the style of Janis Joplin and Grace Slick. Later in 1969, Ronnie and Estelle were invited into the studio by Jimi Hendrix to record backing vocals on "Earth Blues". Their work on the song earned the Ronettes a credit on the LP Rainbow Bridge.

=== Reunions and lawsuit against Spector ===
Ronnie left Phil on June 12, 1972, and their divorce was finalized in 1974. As she made an attempt to revive her career, she decided to reform the Ronettes. Nedra had no interest in returning to the group, and Estelle was unable to perform due to mental illness. Ronnie replaced them with Chip Fields (mother of actress Kim Fields) and Denise Edwards. They recorded several songs for Buddah Records in 1973, a cover of "I Wish I Never Saw the Sun Shine", a song Ronnie had first done in 1965 though Phil Spector had refused to release it. The stint at Buddah was not successful, and by 1975, Ronnie had abandoned the idea of continuing the Ronettes and began her solo career.

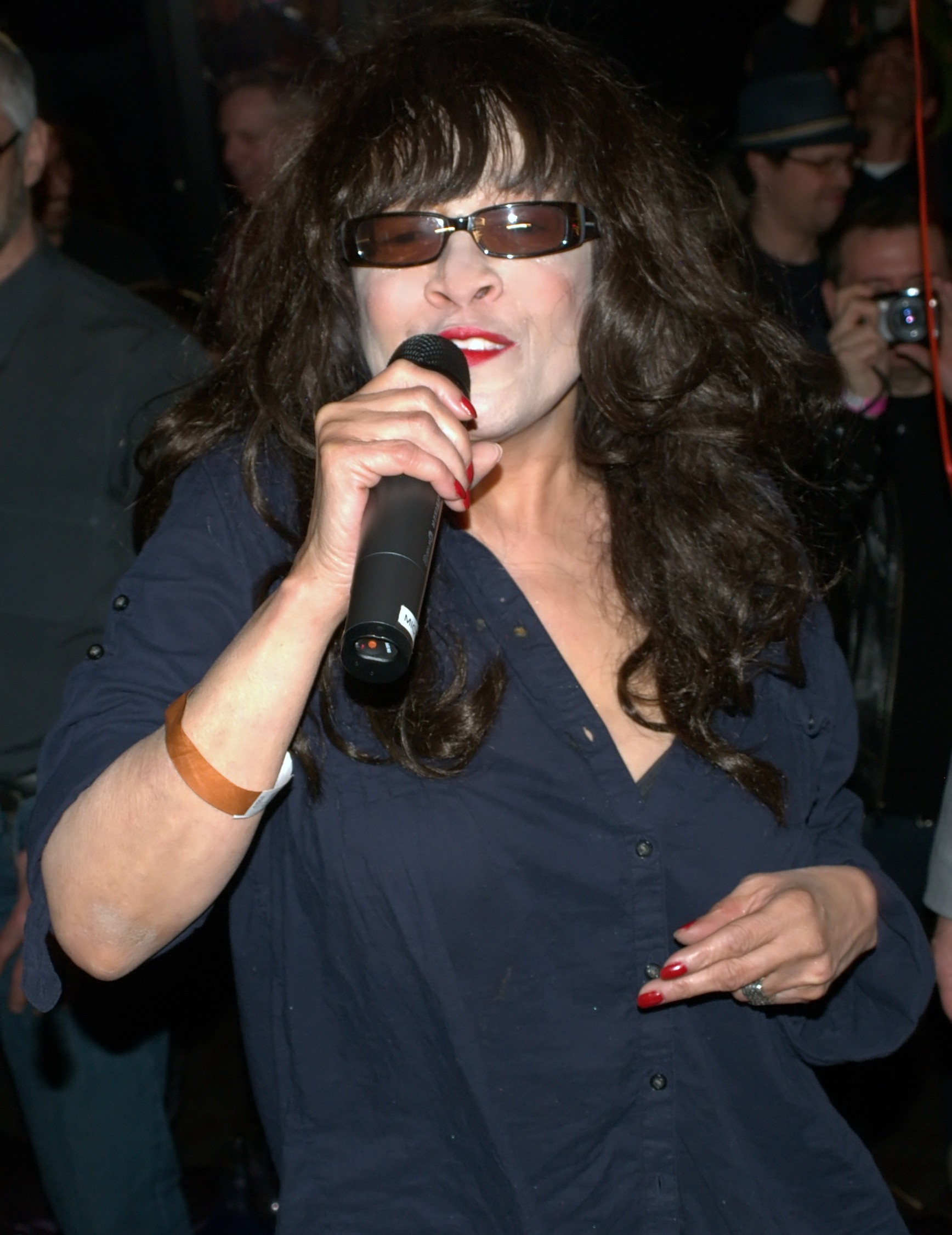
Ronnie Spector in 2010 singing "Be My Baby" to Michael Musto

In 1988, the original Ronettes sued Phil Spector for $10 million over unpaid royalties and for unpaid income he made from licensing of Ronettes’ music. It took the case a decade to make its way to trial. In 2000, Phil was ordered to pay them more than $2.6 million. Phil appealed and in 2001 the state Supreme Court's Appellate Division upheld a lower court finding that he had violated his 1963 contract. He appealed that ruling as well, taking the case to the New York State Supreme Court in 2002. In its ruling, the State Court of Appeals said it found the Ronettes' "plight sympathetic, because they have earned less than $15,000 in royalties from songs that topped the charts and made them famous," but the judge found that their contract gave Spector unconditional rights to the recordings. The judge also reversed a lower court's ruling that they were entitled to the music industry's standard 50 percent royalty rate on sales of records, tapes and compact discs. However, it was ruled that Spector was entitled to her share of the royalties; she had argued that she was forced to sign away her rights to royalties in her 1974 divorce settlement. The royalties of the group's other two members were not in dispute.

In 2017, Spector released a new single "Love Power", under the name Ronnie Spector and The Ronettes, making it the first Ronettes single in decades.

=== Deaths ===
On February 11, 2009, Estelle died of colon cancer at the age of 67 in Englewood, New Jersey. Ronnie died on January 12, 2022, following a brief battle with cancer at the age of 78. Nedra Talley, the last of the group's core members, died on April 26, 2026, at the age of 80.

== Legacy and Achievements ==
The Ronettes were nominated for a Grammy Award in 1965 for "Walking in the Rain". They were inducted into the Grammy Hall of Fame for "Be My Baby" in 1999. The Ronettes were also inducted into the Vocal Group Hall of Fame in 2004 and the People's Hall of Rock and Roll Legends in 2010. The Ronettes' influence on music was significant. In addition to Brian Wilson of the Beach Boys, Billy Joel and Bruce Springsteen have both cited Ronnie Bennett as an influence. The Ronettes' fashion style was emulated by British musician Amy Winehouse.

It was reported that Phil Spector, in his capacity as a member of the Board of Governors, prevented the Ronettes from being nominated for induction into the Rock and Roll Hall of Fame, although they had been eligible for a considerable length of time. In a letter obtained by Ronnie's lawyers, addressed to the Rock Hall's nominating committee, Phil claimed that, apart from Ronnie, the group members did not appear on their records, and that they did not make the contribution required for induction. While he was awaiting trial on a murder charge, the Ronettes were inducted into the Rock and Roll Hall of Fame on March 12, 2007, at the Waldorf-Astoria Hotel in New York City. They were inducted by Rolling Stones guitarist Keith Richards. Ronnie and Nedra performed "Baby, I Love You", "Walking in the Rain", and "Be My Baby". Estelle was present to accept her award but was not well enough to perform, so Tricia Scotti (a regular backup singer with Ronnie) took her place behind the microphone.

== Group members ==
Principal lineup

- Veronica Bennett
- Estelle Bennett
- Nedra Talley

== Discography ==
- Presenting the Fabulous Ronettes (1964)

== Sources ==
- Spector, Ronnie (2004). Be My Baby: How I Survived Mascara, Miniskirts, and Madness, or My Life as a Fabulous Ronette. New York: New American Library. ISBN 0-451-41153-6.
