= Be My Baby =

1963 song by the Ronettes

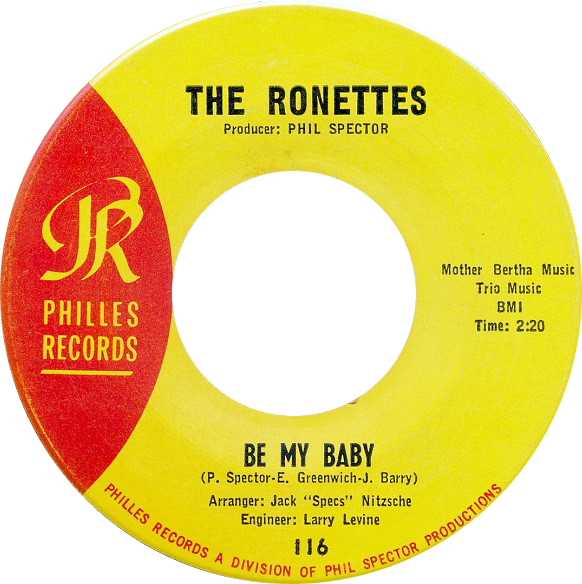

Single by the Ronettes

from the album Presenting the Fabulous Ronettes
- B-side: "Tedesco and Pitman"
- Released: August 1963
- Recorded: July 29, 1963
- Studio: Gold Star, Hollywood
- Genre: Pop; R&B
- Length: 2:41
- Label: Philles
- Songwriters: Jeff Barry; Ellie Greenwich; Phil Spector
- Producer: Phil Spector

The Ronettes singles chronology
"Good Girls" (1963)	"Be My Baby" (1963)	"Baby, I Love You" (1963)

Phil Spector singles chronology
"Wait 'Til My Bobby Gets Home" (1963)	"Be My Baby" (1963)	"A Fine, Fine Boy" (1963)

Official audio
- "Be My Baby" on YouTube

Audio sample
- file; help

"Be My Baby" is a song written by Jeff Barry, Ellie Greenwich, and Phil Spector and recorded by the American girl group the Ronettes. It was released in August 1963 as the Ronettes' debut on Philles Records and became their biggest hit, reaching number 2 in the U.S. and Canada, and number 4 in the UK.

Spector produced the song in his Wall of Sound style at Gold Star Studios in Hollywood with the group of session musicians later known as the Wrecking Crew. It marked the first time that he recorded with a full orchestra. Ronnie Spector (then Veronica Bennett) is the only Ronette that appears on the track. In 1964, it appeared on their album Presenting the Fabulous Ronettes.

A significant influence on music production, "Be My Baby" is sometimes ranked among the all-time greatest songs in popular music. It influenced many artists, most notably the Beach Boys' Brian Wilson, who wrote the answer song "Don't Worry Baby" (1964). Many others have replicated or recreated Hal Blaine's central drum phrase, considered to be one of the most recognizable in pop music.

The song has been played on radio and television over 3 million times and has returned to the U.S. top 40 via cover versions by Andy Kim and Jody Miller. In 2006, the Library of Congress inducted the Ronettes' recording into the National Recording Registry.

== Background and lyrics ==
"Be My Baby" was written by Phil Spector, Jeff Barry, and Ellie Greenwich at Spector's office in Los Angeles. Unlike other pop songs, the lyrics describe a woman vying for the attention of a man whom she infantilizes, a dynamic that is usually reversed. Music journalist Marc Spitz interpreted this "bold" subject matter as essentially "as much about power and control as it is about romance."

Early in 1963, Spector auditioned a vocal trio — composed of sisters Veronica (also known as "Ronnie") and Estelle Bennett with their cousin Nedra Talley — who were performing under the names "Ronnie and the Relatives" and "the Ronettes". Impressed by Ronnie's lead on an impromptu performance of the 1956 hit "Why Do Fools Fall in Love", Spector offered an original song for the group to record, "Why Don't They Let Us Fall in Love". They recorded the song at Gold Star Studios, but Spector withheld its release, as he had felt that the group needed more time to refine their stage act.

Spector, then struggling with marital issues, had developed a romantic fixation on Ronnie at this time. Darlene Love stated that "Be My Baby" was a means for Spector to declare his love to Ronnie before he married her in 1968. It was his last record that had "Phil + Annette", referring to his then-wife Annette Merar, inscribed onto the run-out groove.

== Composition ==
"Be My Baby" has been described as a classic pop and R&B song. It is written in the key of E major and its instrumental palette includes piano, guitars, brass, shakers, castanets, bass, handclaps, strings, and drums. The recording opens with two bars of a drum beat with prominent reverb; the snare drum, striking on the fourth beat of each bar until the chorus, is augmented by woodblock, tambourine, and handclaps. The third bar introduces the full rhythm section, with shakers and a repeated octave E figure on every eighth note contributing to the driving rhythm, in addition to a contrapuntal three-note riff played by the bass and piano section.

The lead vocal enters on the fifth measure as the verse chord progression repeats an E–F♯m–B sequence twice. The spatial mixing places the vocal apart from the instruments, creating a sense of closer proximity to the listener through its shorter reverberation. Producer Brian Eno described this effect as rendering Ronnie's voice akin to "a little bee" inside an "enormous, huge sonic picture". According to author and musician Virgil Moorefield, "The words are sung against the backdrop of a sonic landscape suggestive of fantasy and desire as the song builds toward the climactic chorus."

After the two verses repeat, the harmonic progression shifts through G♯7–C♯7–F#–B7. The entry of a horn section, centered on a baritone saxophone, accentuates the V chord through a descending line that resolves to the chorus, which consists of a standard I–vi–IV–V doo-wop progression. Here, a pronounced backbeat emerges as the snare drum strikes on the second beat of each bar and the castanets, reduced in audibility, adopt a more active flamenco pattern. The backing vocals assume the melodic line from the verse from which ornamental flourishes are sung by the lead vocal. Author Rikky Rooksby writes that, in addition to the "dry and upfront vocal ... those carefully rehearsed wha-ah-oh-ohs, along with the vast sound, make the record what it is."

The song repeats its verse and chorus — the former with added backing vocals — before segueing to a bridge section that consists of the verse's lead melody substituted with violins and violas. The chorus then recurs for eight bars; an abrupt halt follows, during which the drums play the opening two-bar pattern in isolation before the full chorus resumes. The final fade-out features the drums playing fills on every second bar.

== Recording ==
Spector produced "Be My Baby" on July 29, 1963, at Gold Star Studios in Los Angeles with his de facto house band, later known as "the Wrecking Crew". It was the first time Spector recorded with a full orchestra at Gold Star. According to biographer Mick Brown, Spector was "determined to make his most towering production yet" and summoned "the full complement of his troops in Gold Star – battalions of pianos and guitars, brass, strings, the full regiment of backing singers".

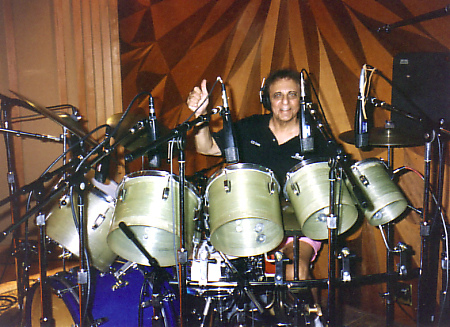
Wrecking Crew musician Hal Blaine (pictured 1995) played drums on "Be My Baby"

The song was arranged by Spector regular Jack Nitzsche and engineered by Larry Levine. Guitars on the session were played by Tommy Tedesco and Bill Pitman, after whom the instrumental "Tedesco and Pitman" on the B-side of the single was named. According to Brown, the opening drum beat, played by Hal Blaine, was suggested by Nitzsche. However, Blaine stated, "That famous drum intro was an accident. I was supposed to play the snare on the second beat as well as the fourth, but I dropped a stick. Being the faker I was in those days, I left the mistake in and it became: 'Bum-ba-bum-BOOM!' And soon everyone wanted that beat."

Owing to Spector's perfectionism, the band rehearsed the song for four hours in the studio before the tape recorders were turned on. One of the four keyboard players, Michael Spencer, recalled, "That session took three and a half hours. There's this pause towards the end of the song where the drums go boom-ba-boom-boom before the song picks up again. I remember that by the fortieth or forty-first take I was so punchy, I played right through it, and we had to do it again. And that subsequent take was the one Phil used."

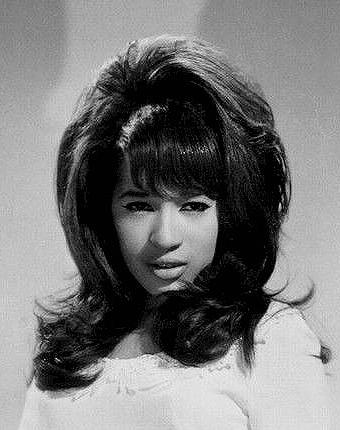
The Ronettes' lead singer Veronica Bennett (pictured 1966) is the only member of the group who participated in the recording.

Ronnie — the only Ronette who appears on the record — overdubbed her lead vocal within a day after the backing track had been completed. She spent the previous three days preparing for the session. Ronnie remembered, "I was so shy that I'd do all my vocal rehearsals in the studio's ladies' room, because I loved the sound I got in there. People talk about how great the echo chamber was at Gold Star, but they never heard the sound in that ladies' room ... That's where all the little 'whoa-ohs' and 'oh-oh-oh-ohs' you hear on my records were born." She said that when she sang the song at the session, "the band went nuts. I was 18 years old, 3,000 miles from home, and had all these guys saying I was the next Billie Holiday."

Nitzsche praised Ronnie's vibrato, saying, "That was her strong point. When that tune was finished, the speakers were turned up so high in the booth that people had to leave the room." Levine said, "We didn't have to work hard to get Ronnie's performance, but we had to work hard to satisfy Phil. He'd spend an inordinate amount of time working on each section and playing it back before moving on to the next one, and that was very hard for the singers."

Sonny Bono and Cher were among the backing vocalists. Cher stated in a television interview, "I was just hanging out with Son [Bono], and one night Darlene [Love] didn't show up, and Philip looked at me and he was getting really cranky, y'know. Philip was not one to be kept waiting. And he said, 'Sonny said you can sing?' And so, as I was trying to qualify what I felt my ... 'expertise' was, he said, 'Look I just need noise – get out there!' I started as noise, and that was 'Be My Baby'."

== Release and commercial performance ==
"Be My Baby" (backed with "Tedesco and Pitman") was released by Philles Records in August 1963 and reached number 2 on the Billboard Pop Singles Chart by the end of the summer. It also topped the Canadian CHUM Chart during a four-week stay. In the UK, it was issued by London Recordings in October and peaked at number 4 on Record Retailer. By the end of the year, the single had sold more than two million copies.

In her autobiography, Ronnie relates that she was on tour with Joey Dee and the Starlighters when "Be My Baby" was introduced by Dick Clark on American Bandstand as the "Record of the Century." The Ronettes' first royalty cheque for the song totaled $14,000 (equivalent to $147,000 in 2025). It remains the Ronettes' most successful song; although the group enjoyed several more top 40 hits, they sold at underwhelming volumes compared to "Be My Baby". In later interviews, Ronnie cited "Be My Baby" as one of her top five favorite songs in her catalog: "I loved it so much, the sweat and the tears and the sex appeal, everything."

A live rendition of "Be My Baby" was performed by the Ronettes on the 1966 rock concert film The Big TNT Show, for which Spector was the musical director and associate producer.

== Musical impact and legacy ==
=== Popular music and record production ===
Sometimes ranked among the finest recordings in the history of popular music, "Be My Baby" became widely regarded as Spector's most significant achievement. Biographer and music journalist Richard Williams wrote it "nailed the idea of the Wall of Sound to the consciousness of every teenage pop fan", while musicologist John Covach reported that although brief and simple in form, the record created "an aural impression of grandness of scale" that distinguished it from other radio hits and "made an enormous impression" within the industry. Moorefield deemed the production to be "the Wall of Sound at its finest."

The song was a major influence on artists such as the Beatles and the Beach Boys, who went on to innovate with their own studio productions. AllMusic's Jason Ankeny noted in his review of the song that "No less an authority than Brian Wilson has declared 'Be My Baby' the greatest pop record ever made — no arguments here." Producer Steve Levine compared the track's impact on sound design to that of the Beach Boys' "Good Vibrations" (1966), 10cc's "I'm Not in Love", and Queen's "Bohemian Rhapsody" (both 1975).

Many subsequent popular songs have replicated or recreated the drum phrase, considered to be one of the most recognizable in popular music. Producer Rick Nowels, who lifted the drum beat for a Lana Del Rey song, said, "'Be My Baby,' for me, is Ground Zero for the modern pop era. it was a line in the sand that left everything that came before in the rear view mirror. It was the beginning of pop music being a serious American art form."

"Be My Baby" has been included on numerous critics' rankings. In 2006, it was ranked number 6 on Pitchfork's list "The 200 Best Songs of the 1960s". NME ranked it number 2 on its 2012 list of the "100 Best Songs of the 1960s" and number 9 on its 2014 list of "The 500 Greatest Songs of All Time". In 2016, Paste ranked the song at number 11 on its list "The 100 Best Songs of the 1960s". In 2024, Rolling Stone ranked the song at number 22 on its list "The 500 Greatest Songs of All Time".

In 2006, the Library of Congress inducted the Ronettes' recording into the National Recording Registry. In 2016, Barbara Cane, vice president and general manager of writer-publisher relations for the songwriters' agency BMI, estimated that the song had been played in 3.9 million feature presentations on radio and television since 1963, "the equivalent of 17 years back to back."

=== Brian Wilson ===
"Be My Baby" had a profound lifelong impact on Beach Boys leader and co-founder Brian Wilson, whose admiration for the song was persistently referenced in biographies and during interviews. He first heard it while driving and listening to the radio, and became so enthralled by the chorus that he felt compelled to pull over to the side of the road and analyze it. Wilson immediately concluded that it was the greatest record he had ever heard. It directly influenced many of his subsequent productions, one of the earliest being "I Do", recorded that November. In his own words, Wilson had "balls-out totally freaked out" over the song: "it was like having your mind revamped". Copies of the record were located in his car, living room jukebox, and virtually everywhere else inside his home.

Wilson conceived the Beach Boys' 1964 hit "Don't Worry Baby" as an answer song. It was originally submitted for the Ronettes' consideration before being rejected by Spector, who had a policy against producing records lacking his own writing credit. Spector was aware of Wilson's obsession and joked that he would have enjoyed "a nickel for every joint" Wilson had smoked while studying "Be My Baby". Wilson's daughter Carnie, born in 1968, stated that "every day" of her childhood began with her awaking to a playback of the record. Music historian Luis Sanchez characterizes the accumulation of stories such as these as effectively depicting "an image of wretchedness: Brian locked in the bedroom ... listening to 'Be My Baby' over and over at aggressive volumes, for hours ...". (Note: Among the many documented anecdotes related to Wilson's obsession with "Be My Baby", lyric partner Gary Usher remembered witnessing Wilson, circa 1963, listening to the song "for two days straight without stopping, without eating. ... This is no exaggeration." Music journalist David Dalton, who had visited Wilson's home in 1967, reported that Wilson had spoken at length about "Be My Baby", analyzing the song "like an adept memorizing the Koran." Dalton quoted some of Wilson's comments regarding the song, in that the four notes corresponding to the opening drum beat was "the same sound a carpenter makes when he's hammering in a nail, a bird sings when it gets on its branch, or a baby makes when she shakes her rattle". Wilson's bandmate and cousin Mike Love remembered Wilson comparing the song to Albert Einstein's theory of relativity. In the early 1970s, Wilson instructed his engineer Stephen Desper to create a tape loop consisting only of the final chorus in "Be My Baby", which he listened to for several hours.)

The Beach Boys' 1977 song "Mona", written by Wilson, ends with the lines "Listen to 'Be My Baby' / I know you're going to love Phil Spector". He told The New York Times in 2013 that he had listened to the song at least one thousand times. Beach Boy Bruce Johnston gave a higher estimate: "Brian must have played 'Be My Baby' ten million times. He never seemed to get tired of it." (Note: During a 1980 appearance on Good Morning America, host Joan Lunden inquired Wilson for his musical tastes, to which Wilson replied simply with "I listen to a song called 'Be My Baby' by the Ronettes." In his 2016 memoir, I Am Brian Wilson, he recalled once playing the drum intro "ten times until everyone in the room told me to stop, and then I played it ten more times." He listed other songs that "hit almost as hard" as "Be My Baby", including "Rock Around the Clock" (1955), "Keep A-Knockin'" (1957), "Hey Girl" (1963), and "You've Lost That Lovin' Feeling" (1964), but conceded that "it's hard to re-create the feeling of first hearing 'Be My Baby'".)

== Later versions ==
- Vianey Valdez had chart success in Mexico with her version, released as "Tu Seras Mi Babi" on the Peerless label. It entered the Mexico's Best Sellers chart at no. 3 on 21 August 1964. It remained in the chart until 30 January 1965.
- 1970 – Andy Kim released a version of the song as a single. In the U.S., his version spent 11 weeks on the Billboard Hot 100, reaching No. 17, and No. 24 on Billboard's Easy Listening chart. It also reached No. 12 on the Cash Box Top 100. In Canada, the song reached No. 6 on the RPM 100, while reaching No. 16 on the New Zealand Listener chart, No. 24 in West Germany, and No. 36 on Australia's Go-Set National Top 60. It was also a hit in Brazil. Kim's version was ranked No. 80 on RPM's year end ranking of the "RPM 100 Top Singles of '71".
- 1972 – Jody Miller released a version as a single and on the album There's a Party Goin' On. Her version reached No. 15 on Billboard's Hot Country Singles chart and No. 35 on Billboard's Easy Listening chart. It also reached No. 15 on the Cash Box Country Top 75 and Record World's Country Singles Chart. In Canada, the song reached No. 11 on the RPM Country Playlist.
- 1976 – Shaun Cassidy released a cover of the song on his eponymous debut album. The following year it was released as a single and reached No. 39 in West Germany.
- 1980 – Mike Love recorded a cover of the song and appeared on his solo debut album Looking Back with Love the following year in 1981. It was produced alongside his cousin and bandmate of The Beach Boys, Brian Wilson, only to be finished without him and being credited to Curt Boettcher for the production.
- 1982 – Gary Glitter covered the song, which was included in a compilation of his music, named "Hey Song" from 2011.
- 1992 – Teen Queens released a cover of the song that reached number 6 on the Australian ARIA Singles Chart in May 1992. It was certified gold in Australia and was the country's 44th-most-successful song of 1992. In 2009, a Herald Sun poll ranked this version as one of the top 10 worst Australian covers of all time.
- 2013 – Leslie Grace covered the song in bachata for her eponymous album in a bilingual version in English and Spanish. Her version peaked at number 8 on the Billboard Hot Latin Songs and number 6 on the Tropical Songs chart.

== In popular culture ==
- The lyric "whoa-oh-oh-oh" was reprised in their follow-up single "Baby, I Love You".
- The song appears in the opening credit sequence of Martin Scorsese's film Mean Streets (1973). Scorsese used the song without legal clearance, allowing Spector to claim a portion of the film's earnings.
- Similarly, the song appears in the opening sequence of the 1987 film Dirty Dancing.
- Bob Seger's 1976 hit "Night Moves" includes the line "humming a song from 1962", which Seger meant as a reference to "Be My Baby", although he misidentified the year the song was released.
- The song is invoked and interpolated in Eddie Money's 1986 song "Take Me Home Tonight", in which Ronnie Spector replies to "Just like Ronnie sang ..." with "Be my little baby".
- The song accompanies the climactic final scene of the "I Am Curious… Maddie" episode of Moonlighting aired March 31, 1987, as main characters David Addison (Bruce Willis) and Maddie Hayes (Cybill Shepherd) sexually consummate their relationship.
- The song's distinctive drum intro appears throughout "Just Like Honey" by The Jesus and Mary Chain, "How the Mighty Have Fallen" by Margo Price, "Perfection As A Hipster" by God Help The Girl, "Summer's Been and Gone" by Language of Flowers, and "Master of Art" by Laura Stevenson.
- The 2007 single "B Boy Baby" by Mutya Buena featuring Amy Winehouse borrows melodic and lyrical passages from "Be My Baby".
- The song appears in a fantasy sequence involving Kamala Khan in the Disney+/Marvel series Ms. Marvel, in the second episode "Crushed", after Kamala comes home following an encounter with her crush, Kamran.
- Taylor Swift interludes the "whoa-oh-oh-oh" part of the song in her song Opalite.
- The song appears at the end of the Horror/Mystery film Barbarian (2022).

== Awards and accolades ==
- In 1999, it was inducted into the Grammy Hall of Fame.
- In 2004, it was ranked number 22 on Rolling Stone's list of the "500 Greatest Songs of All Time", where it was described as a "Rosetta stone for studio pioneers such as the Beatles and Brian Wilson." It was also ranked number 22 on the list's 2021 edition and again the 2023 edition.
- In 2006, it was ranked number 6 on Pitchfork's list of "The 200 Greatest Songs of the 1960s".
- In 2011, it was included in Time's list of the "All-Time 100 Songs".
- In 2014, it was ranked number 2 on NME's list of the "100 Best Songs of the 1960s".
- In 2017, the song topped Billboard's list of the "100 Greatest Girl Group Songs of All Time".
- In 2023, the song ranked 19th on Billboard's "500 Best Pop Songs of All Time".

== Charts ==
Weekly chart performance (Ronettes version)
Chart (1963)	Peak position
Belgium (Ultratop 50 Flanders)	4
Belgium (Ultratop 50 Wallonia)	15
Canada (CHUM)	2
France (SNEP)	193
New Zealand (Lever Hit Parade)	2
Norway (VG-lista)	9
UK (Disc)	4
UK (Record Retailer)	4
US Billboard Hot 100	2
US Hot R&B Singles (Billboard)	4
US Cash Box Top 100	1
West Germany (Musikmarkt)	60

Year-end charts (Ronettes version)
Chart (1963)	Ranking
Canada (CHUM)	15
US Billboard Hot 100	35
US Billboard Top R&B Singles	48
US Cash Box Top 100	44

== Certifications ==
Region	Certification	Certified units/sales
Denmark (IFPI Danmark)	Gold	45,000^{‡}
Germany (BVMI)	Gold	300,000^{‡}
Italy (FIMI)	Gold	50,000^{‡}
New Zealand (RMNZ)	2× Platinum	60,000^{‡}
Spain (Promusicae)	Platinum	60,000^{‡}
United Kingdom (BPI)	2× Platinum	1,200,000^{‡}
^{‡} Sales+streaming figures based on certification alone.

== Bibliography ==
- Brown, Mick (2007). Tearing Down the Wall of Sound: The Rise and Fall of Phil Spector. London: Bloomsbury. ISBN 978-1-4000-4219-7.
- Carlin, Peter Ames (2006). Catch a Wave: The Rise, Fall, and Redemption of the Beach Boys' Brian Wilson. Rodale. ISBN 978-1-59486-320-2.
- Covach, John (2012). What's That Sound? An Introduction to Rock and Its History (3rd ed.). New York: W. W. Norton & Company. ISBN 9780393912043.
- Howard, David N. (2004). Sonic Alchemy: Visionary Music Producers and Their Maverick Recordings (1st ed.). Milwaukee, Wisconsin: Hal Leonard Corp. ISBN 0-634-05560-7.
- Lambert, Philip (2007). Inside the Music of Brian Wilson: the Songs, Sounds, and Influences of the Beach Boys' Founding Genius. Continuum. ISBN 978-0-8264-1876-0.
- Jones, Lesley-Ann (2012). Freddie Mercury: The Definitive Biography. Hodder & Stoughton. p. 151. ISBN 978-1-4447-3369-3.
- Love, Mike (2016). Good Vibrations: My Life as a Beach Boy. Penguin Publishing Group. ISBN 978-0-698-40886-9.
- Ribowsky, Mark (2006). He's a Rebel: Phil Spector – Rock and Roll's Legendary Producer. Cambridge, Massachusetts: Da Capo Press. ISBN 978-0-306-81471-6.
- Moorefield, Virgil (2005). The Producer as Composer: Shaping the Sounds of Popular Music. Massachusetts: MIT Press. ISBN 0262134578.
- Rooksby, Rikky (2001). Inside Classic Rock Tracks: Songwriting and Recording Secrets of 100 Great Songs from 1960 to the Present Day. Backbeat Books. ISBN 978-0-87930-654-0.
- Sanchez, Luis (2014). The Beach Boys' Smile. Bloomsbury Publishing. ISBN 978-1-62356-956-3.
- Stebbins, Jon (2000). Dennis Wilson: The Real Beach Boy. ECW Press. ISBN 978-1-55022-404-7.
- Thompson, Dave (2005). Wall of Pain: The Life of Phil Spector (New ed.). London: Sanctuary. ISBN 978-1-86074-645-1.
- Toop, David (1995). Ocean of Sound: Aether Talk, Ambient Sound and Imaginary Worlds. London and New York: Serpent's Tail. ISBN 978-1-85242-743-6. OCLC 1150927269.
- White, Timothy (1996). The Nearest Faraway Place: Brian Wilson, the Beach Boys, and the Southern Californian Experience. Macmillan. ISBN 0-333-64937-0.
- Williams, Richard (2003) [1972]. Phil Spector: Out of His Head (illustrated, revised ed.). London: Omnibus. ISBN 9780711998643.
- Wilson, Brian; Greenman, Ben (2016). I Am Brian Wilson: A Memoir. Da Capo Press. ISBN 978-0-306-82307-7.
