= Estelle Bennett =

American singer (1941–2009)

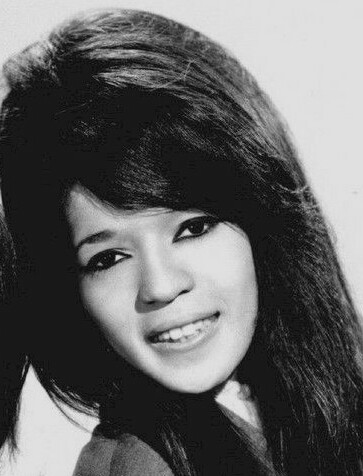
- Bennett in 1966

Background information
- Born: July 22, 1941; New York City, U.S.
- Died: February 11, 2009 (aged 67) Englewood, New Jersey, U.S.
- Genres: R&B; pop; rock
- Occupation: Singer
- Years active: 1959–1972
- Labels: Colpix; Philles
- Formerly of: The Ronettes

Estelle Bennett (July 22, 1941 – February 11, 2009) was an American singer. She was a member of the girl group the Ronettes, along with her sister Ronnie and cousin Nedra Talley.

== Early life ==
Bennett and her sister, Veronica (later known as Ronnie Bennett and Ronnie Spector), were raised in New York City. Her parents were both described as African American, although Veronica claimed that their father was white and of Irish American ancestry and that their mother was of African American and Cherokee ancestry. Bennett attended George Washington High School in Manhattan where she was valedictorian. Studious and interested in fashion, she studied at Manhattan's Fashion Institute of Technology.

== Career ==
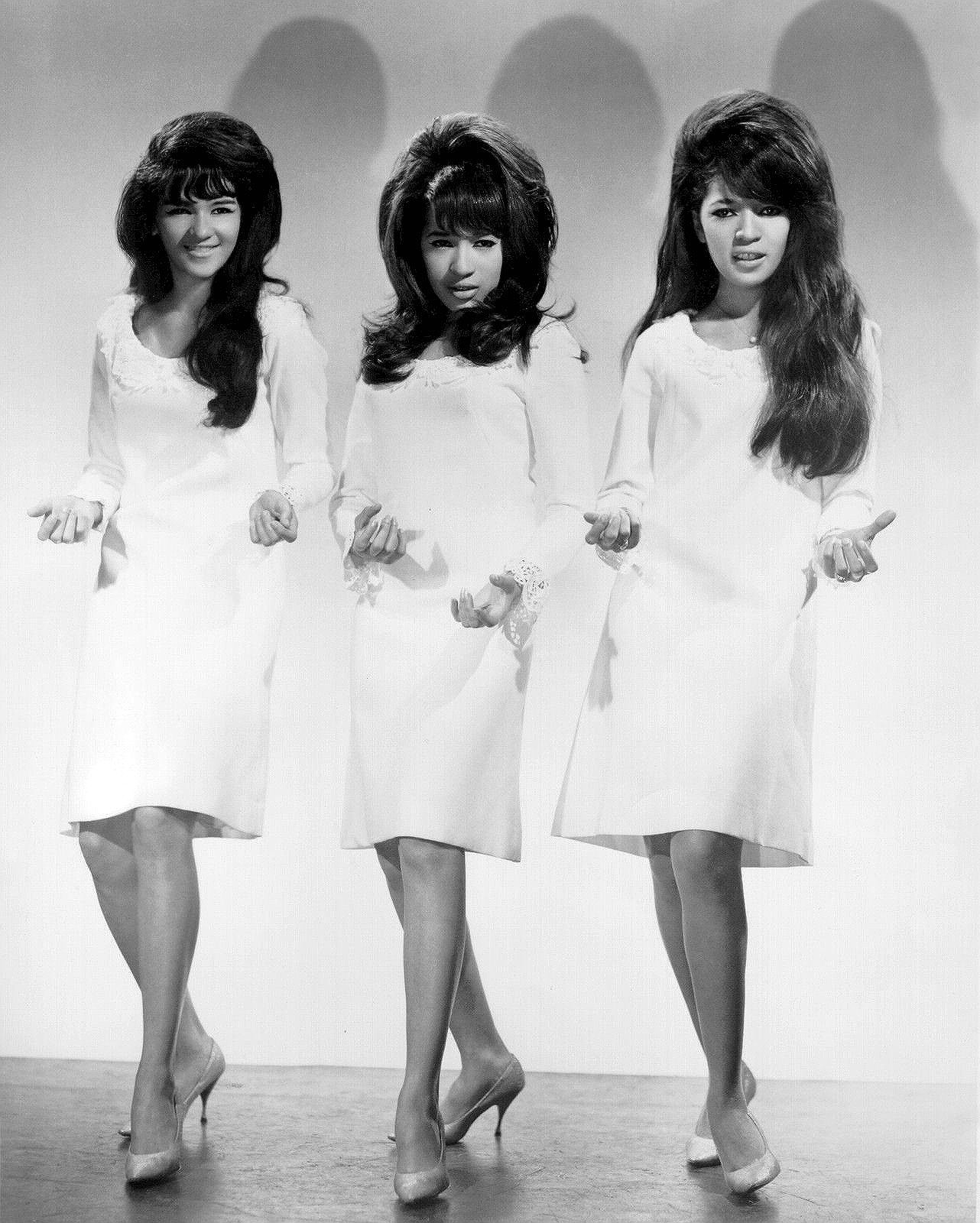
Bennett (right) with the Ronettes

When Bennett was 14, she and her sister Ronnie, and their cousin Nedra Talley started singing together. After a number of unsuccessful attempts, the trio reinvented themselves as the Ronettes. Signed up by 23-year-old Phil Spector, Ronnie became lead, with Estelle and Nedra as backing. They would eventually have a No.1 hit song in 1963, "Be My Baby".

The Ronettes broke up in 1966. Bennett recorded a single in 1968 for Laurie Records, "The Year 2000/The Naked Boy". In 1969, now known as Estal Bond she fronted The Love Chain, a quartet that also featured Laura Logan, Ann Trip and Cookie Woodson. They recorded three 45's but only the Teddy Vann produced 'I'm Lovin' You Baby' released on Minit made any headway. The Love Chain had finished by 1971 and Estelle moved on to further projects. In 1972, Ronnie invited Estelle to her apartment to rehearse when Ronnie was trying to revive the Ronettes. Unfortunately the rehearsal was a failure. Ronnie stated that Estelle had "lost her coordination" and said that it was "bizarre." Also in 1972, she recorded the songs "Baby With No Name" and "Earthman" with the band 1984. Estelle Bennett rarely performed in public from then on, largely quitting the music business.

In 2007, when the Ronettes were inducted into the Rock and Roll Hall of Fame, Bennett was too fragile to perform with them. She spoke two brief sentences during her acceptance speech: "I would just like to say, thank you very much for giving us this award. I'm Estelle of the Ronettes, thank you." She did, however, come back onstage for a final bow with the other Ronettes after the performance of "Be My Baby".

== Personal life and death ==
She married the group's road manager, Joe Dong; the couple had a daughter, Toyin. Her mental health deteriorated in the following years. It was reported that, during a visit to fellow former Ronette, Nedra Talley, she slept through her own baby daughter's crying. She was reported to have had periods of homelessness, during which she would approach strangers in the streets of New York, telling people that she would be singing with the Ronettes in a jazz club.

In the 2024 documentary Beatles '64, her sister Ronnie claimed Estelle was dating George Harrison in early 1964.

Bennett died of colon cancer, aged 67, at her home in Englewood, New Jersey. Her body was discovered on February 11, 2009. A week after her death, it was revealed that she had anorexia nervosa and schizophrenia in the years after the Ronettes' breakup and that she had subsequently been homeless in New York City.
