= Nedra Talley =

American singer (1946–2026)

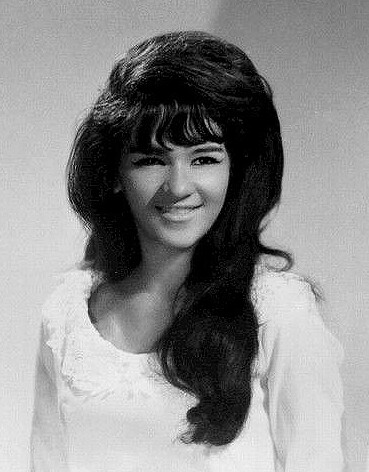
- Talley in 1966

Background information
- Also known as: Nedra Talley-Ross
- Born: Nedra Yvonne Talley; January 27, 1946; New York City, U.S.
- Died: April 26, 2026 (aged 80) Chesapeake, Virginia, U.S.
- Genres: Christian music; pop; rock
- Occupation: Singer
- Years active: 1957–2005
- Labels: Colpix; Philles; New Song
- Formerly of: The Ronettes
- Spouse: Scott Ross (m. 1967; died 2023)

Nedra Yvonne Talley-Ross (January 27, 1946 – April 26, 2026) was an American singer. She was best known as a member of the girl group the Ronettes, in which she performed with her cousins Ronnie and Estelle Bennett.

== Background ==
Nedra Yvonne Talley was born on January 27, 1946, in Manhattan, New York City. She was of African American, Native American, and Puerto Rican descent. Her husband was Scott Ross (1939–2023), a former DJ turned interviewer for The 700 Club on the Christian Broadcasting Network. They had four children. In her later years, she worked in real estate and lived in Virginia Beach, Virginia.

== Career ==
She formed the Ronettes with her cousins Ronnie and Estelle Bennett in 1957.

In 1967, Talley and Estelle Bennett left the Ronettes, a decade after the group's formation. The split was reportedly due in part to interference from the group's producer Phil Spector, who later married Ronnie Bennett. Talley said that when she met Scott Ross, her future husband, she became a born-again Christian. Talley also decided to leave the Ronettes because she felt there was little place for Christian-inspired music.

In 1977, Talley recorded several Christian songs written by her church's music director, Ted Sandquist. These were released on the album The Courts of the King: The Worship Music of Ted Sandquist. One of the cuts, a medley, "Love of My Lord" / "Redwood Tree" was released as a 45 promo single. Guitarist Phil Keaggy played on at least two of the album cuts with her. For its 30th anniversary, this album was finally released on CD.

In 1978, Talley recorded Full Circle, a solo contemporary Christian music album, on which Keaggy once again musically backed her. Keaggy wrote the title track and released his own version of it on his 1981 album Town To Town. The album was produced by Talley's husband, Scott Ross. The album's inner sleeve featured Talley's bio (and salvation story), but also a photo taken in the mid-'60s aboard a plane with Talley and fellow Ronette, Estelle Bennett, sharing seats with The Beatles' John Lennon and George Harrison, who were great fans of the Ronettes. The album has, to date, never been re-released. The Ronettes opened for The Beatles during their 1966 U.S. tour.

A four-disc set, Roger McGuinn's The Folk Den Project (1995–2005), featured the old folk song "Follow the Drinking Gourd", as sung by McGuinn, with Talley providing the sole but prominent background vocal.

In 2007, the Ronettes were inducted into the Rock and Roll Hall of Fame by The Rolling Stones' Keith Richards.

== Personal life and death ==
Following the split of the Ronettes, Talley became a born-again Christian. She was married to Scott Ross, a radio DJ. The couple met while Ross was working as assistant music director at WINS New York. He later became associated with the Jesus movement and beginning in 1970 hosted a nationally syndicated Sunday program, "The Scott Ross Show," which was eventually heard on some 200 stations, including WCBS-FM and WPLJ New York, KIIS Los Angeles, WQXI Atlanta, and KGB AM-FM San Diego.

Talley died at her home in Chesapeake, Virginia, on April 26, 2026, at the age of 80. She was the last survivor of the original Ronettes.

== See also ==
- List of Puerto Ricans
