= Soldier Field =

Stadium in Chicago, Illinois

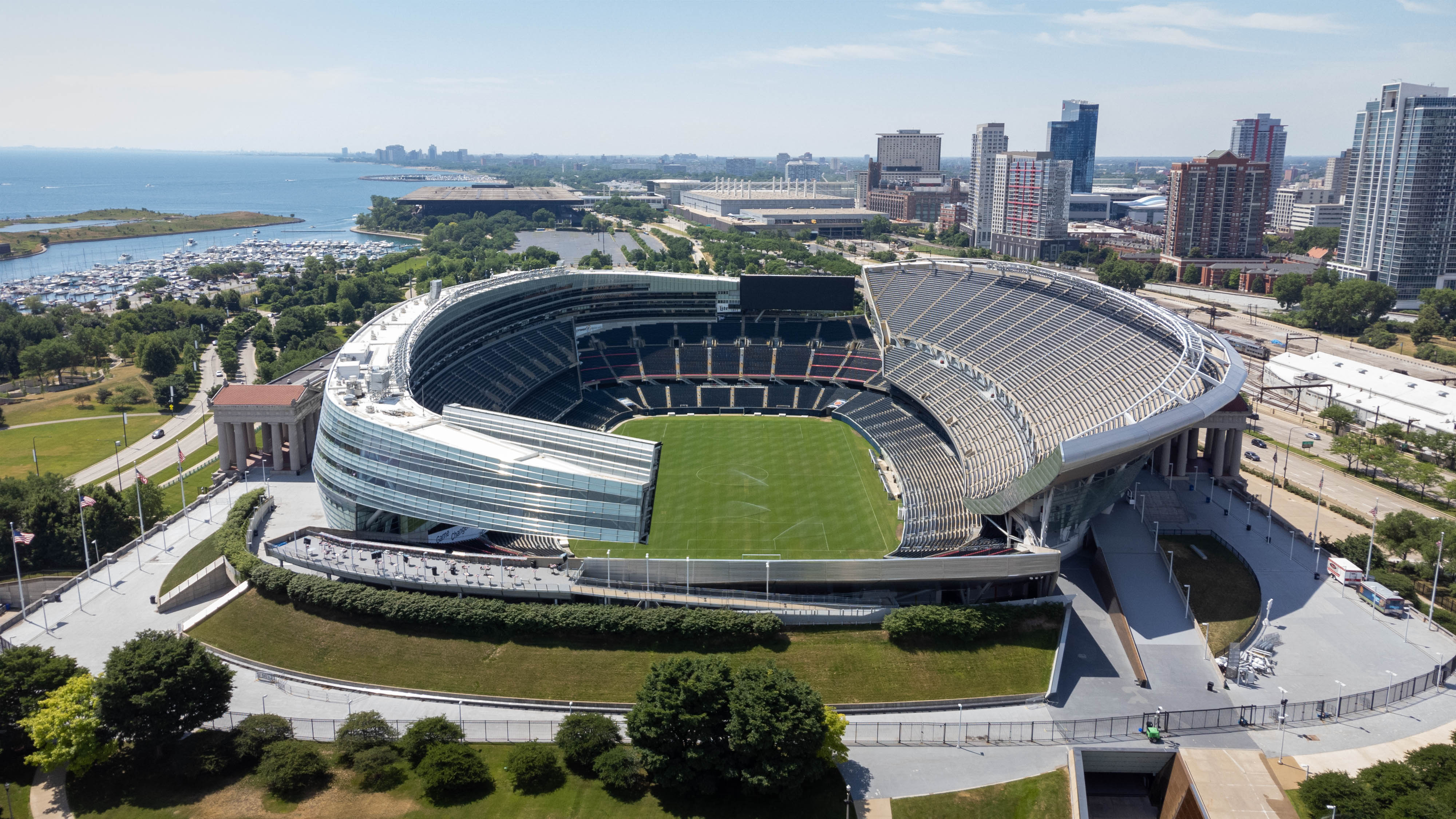
- Soldier Field in 2022

- Location in Chicago Location in Illinois Location in the United States
- Former names: Municipal Grant Park Stadium (1924–1925)
- Address: 1410 Special Olympics Drive
- Location: Chicago, Illinois, U.S.
- Coordinates: 41.8623°N 87.6167°W
- Owner: Chicago Park District
- Operator: ASM Global
- Capacity: 66,944 (1994–2003); 62,500 (since 2003)
- Executive suites: 133
- Surface: Bermuda grass (since 2022); Kentucky Bluegrass (1924–1970, 1988–2022); AstroTurf (1971–1987)
- Acreage: 7 acres (2.8 ha)
- Public transit: Metra: 18th Street; Roosevelt; Red Orange Green

Construction
- Groundbreaking: August 11, 1922
- Built: 1922–1924
- Opened: October 9, 1924
- Renovated: 2002–2003
- Closed: January 19, 2002–September 26, 2003 (renovations)
- Reopened: September 29, 2003 (renovations)
- Cost: US$13 million (original; $244 million in 2015 dollars); US$632 million (renovations; $1.11 billion in 2015 dollars)
- Architects: Holabird & Roche (original); Wood + Zapata, Inc.; Lohan Associates (renovations)
- Project managers: Hoffman Management Partners, LLC (renovations)
- Structural engineer: Thornton Tomasetti (renovations)
- Services engineer: Ellerbe Becket (renovations)
- General contractor: Turner/Barton Malow/Kenny (renovations)

Tenant
- List: Notre Dame Fighting Irish football (NCAA) (1929); Chicago Rockets/Hornets (AAFC) (1946–1949); Chicago Cardinals (NFL) (1959); Chicago Circle Chikas football (NCAA) (1966–1973); Chicago Spurs (NPSL) (1967); Chicago Owls (CFL) (1968–1969); Chicago Bears (NFL) (1971–2001, 2003–present); Chicago Sting (NASL) (1975–1976); Chicago Fire (WFL) (1974); Chicago Winds (WFL) (1975); Chicago Fire (AFA) (1981); Chicago Blitz (USFL) (1983–1984); Chicago Fire FC (MLS) (1998–2001, 2004–2005, 2020–present); Chicago Enforcers (XFL) (2001)

Website
- soldierfield.com

U.S. National Historic Landmark
- Designated: February 27, 1987
- Delisted: February 17, 2006

Soldier Field (historically often referred to as Soldiers' Field) is a multi-purpose stadium on the Near South Side of Chicago, Illinois, United States. Opened in 1924, the stadium has served as the home of the Chicago Bears of the National Football League (NFL) since 1971, (Note: The Bears temporarily played at Memorial Stadium at the University of Illinois for the 2002 NFL season while Soldier Field was undergoing renovations.) as well as Chicago Fire FC of Major League Soccer (MLS) since 2020. (Note: The Fire previously played at Soldier Field from 1998 to 2001 and again from 2004 to 2005. They also temporarily played at Cardinal Stadium (now Benedetti–Wehrli Stadium) in Naperville, Illinois, from 2002 to 2003, while Soldier Field was being renovated.) It also regularly hosts stadium concerts and other large crowd events. The stadium has a football capacity of 62,500, making it the second-smallest stadium in the NFL. Soldier Field is also the oldest stadium in the NFL and MLS.

The stadium's interior was rebuilt as part of a major renovation project in 2002 and 2003, which modernized the facility but lowered its seating capacity, eventually causing it to be delisted as a National Historic Landmark in 2006. Soldier Field has served as the home venue for a number of other sports teams in its history, including the Chicago Cardinals of the NFL and University of Notre Dame football. It hosted the 1994 FIFA World Cup, the 1999 FIFA Women's World Cup, and multiple CONCACAF Gold Cup championships. In 1968, it hosted the inaugural World Games of the Special Olympics, as well as its second World Games in 1970. Other historic events have included large rallies with speeches, including by Amelia Earhart, Franklin D. Roosevelt, and Martin Luther King Jr.

== History ==
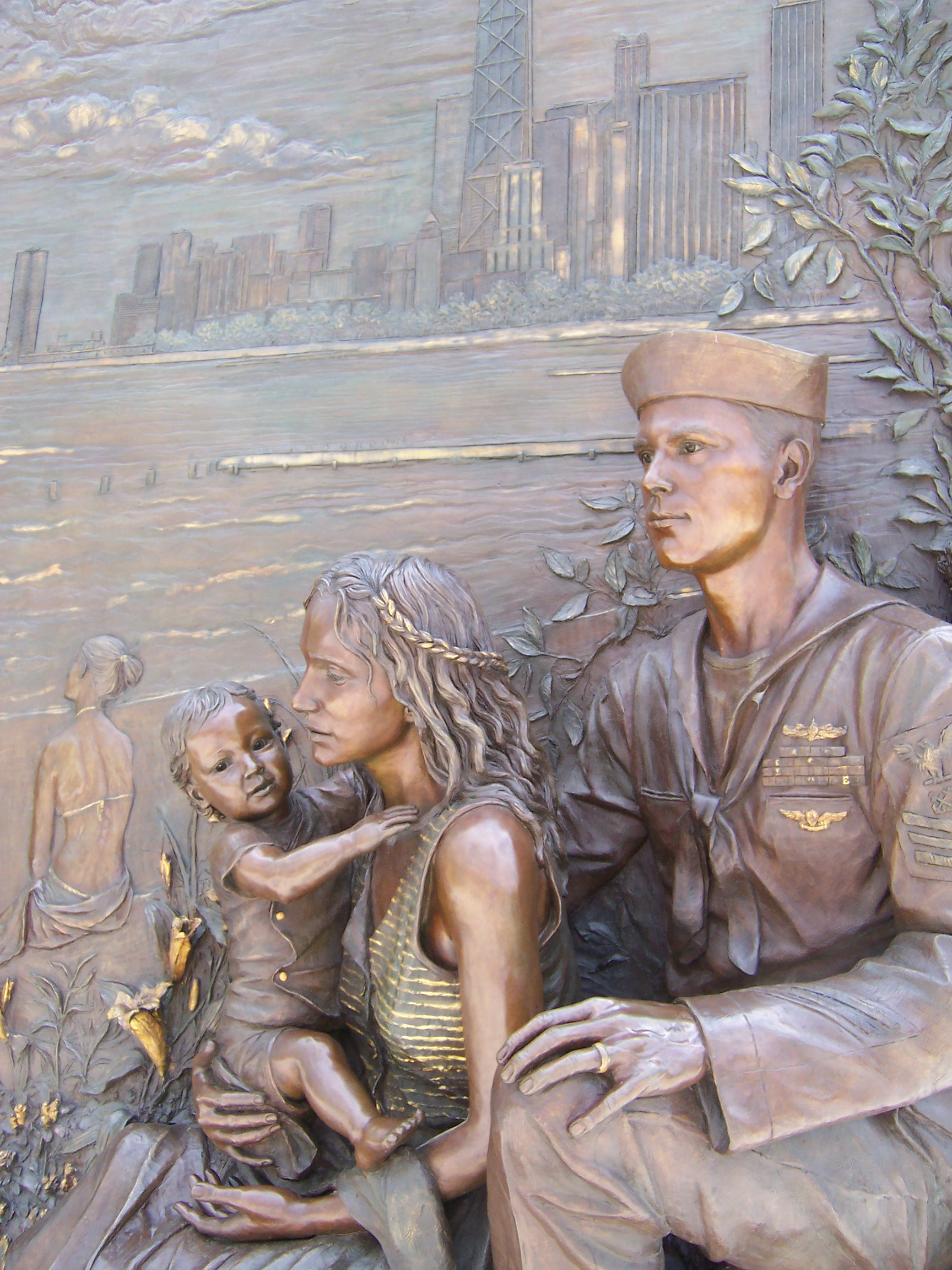
Sculpture of a sailor and his family, gazing eastward over Lake Michigan

On December 3, 1919, Chicago-based architectural firm Holabird & Roche was chosen to design the stadium, which broke ground on August 11, 1922. The stadium cost $13 million to construct (equivalent to $246 million in 2025), a large sum for a sporting venue at that time (in comparison, the Los Angeles Memorial Coliseum had cost less than US$1 million in 1923 dollars). On October 9, 1924, the 53rd anniversary of the Great Chicago Fire, the stadium was officially dedicated as "Grant Park Stadium", although it had hosted a few events before then, including a field day for Chicago police officers on September 6, and the stadium's first football game, between Louisville Male High School and Austin Community Academy High School, on October 4. On November 22, the stadium hosted its first college football game, in which Notre Dame defeated Northwestern University 13–6.

On November 11, 1925, the stadium's name was changed to Soldier Field, in dedication to U.S. soldiers who had died in combat during World War I. Its formal rededication as Soldier Field was held during the 29th annual playing of the Army–Navy Game on November 27, 1926. Several months earlier, in June 1926, the stadium hosted several events during the 28th International Eucharistic Congress, the first held in the United States. During the Century of Progress World's Fair in 1933, it served as the main stage.

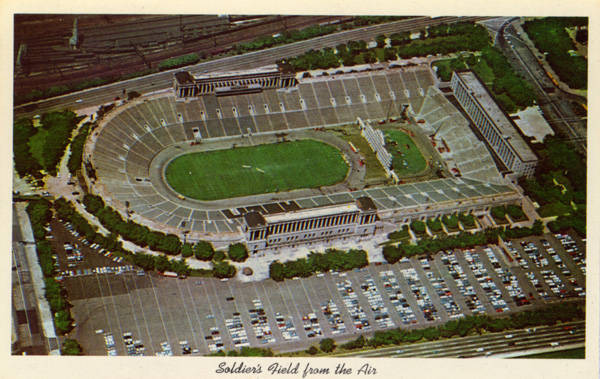
Soldier Field in 1963

The stadium's design is in the Neoclassical style, with Doric columns rising above the East and West entrances. In its earliest configuration, Soldier Field was capable of seating 74,280 spectators, and was in the shape of a U. Additional seating could be added along the interior field, upper promenades, and on the large, open field and terrace beyond the north endzone, bringing the seating capacity to over 100,000. It was estimated that 123,000 fans saw Notre Dame defeat USC 13–12 on November 16, 1929.

=== Chicago Bears move in ===
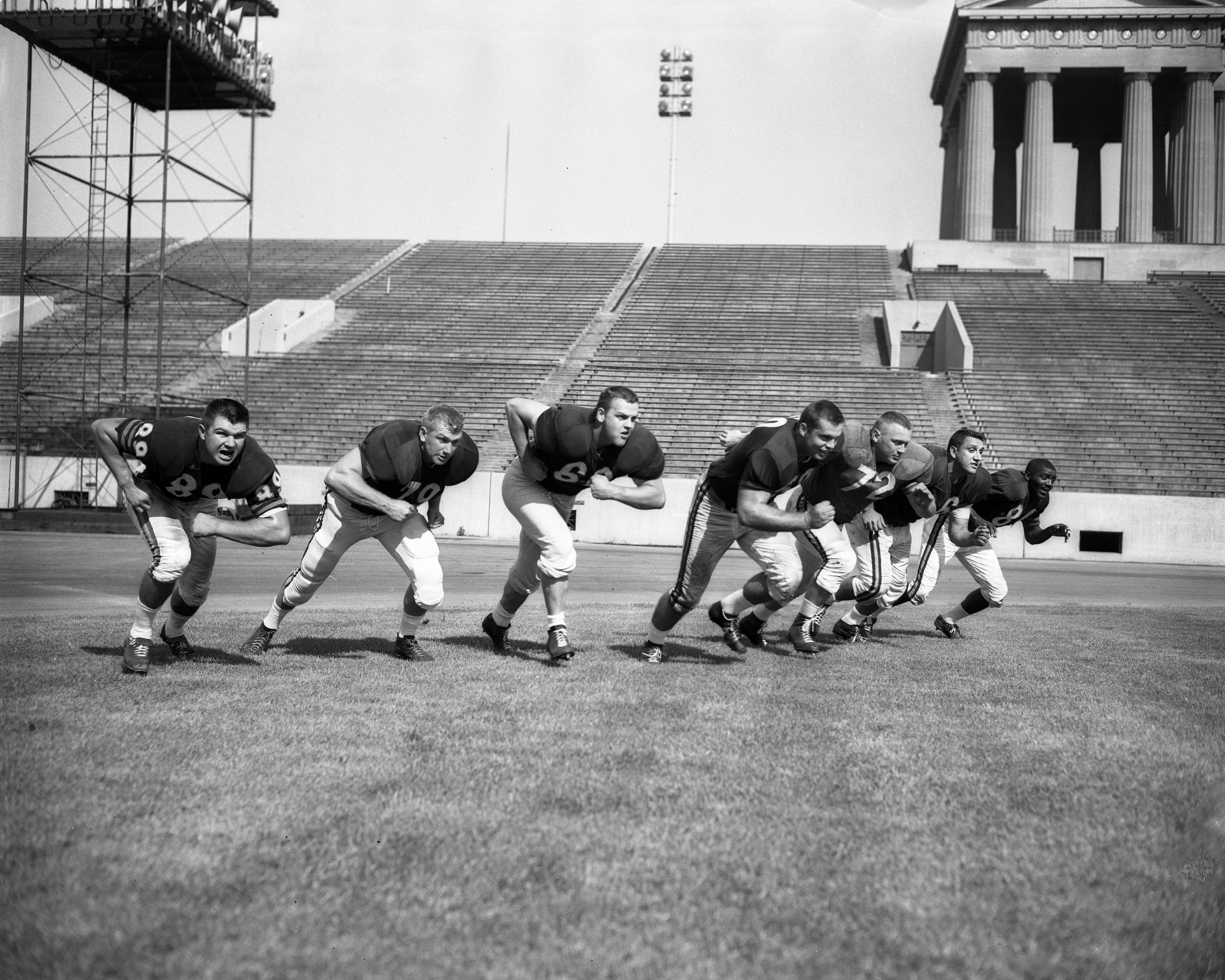
The 1961 Chicago Bears practicing for the Armed Forces Benefit Football Game, which was primarily held at Soldier Field from 1947 to 1970. The Bears permanently moved to Soldier Field in 1971.

Before they moved into the stadium, the Chicago Bears had played select charity games at Soldier Field as early as 1926, when they played their former crosstown rivals, the Chicago Cardinals. The Cardinals also used the stadium as their home field for their final season in the city in 1959.

In 1971, the Bears moved into Soldier Field full-time, originally with a three-year commitment. The team previously played home games at Wrigley Field, the home stadium of the Chicago Cubs of Major League Baseball (MLB), but were forced to move to a larger venue due to post-AFL–NFL merger policies requiring that stadium capacities seat at least 50,000 spectators as well as lighting for potential night games. The Bears had initially intended to build a stadium in Arlington Heights, but the property did not fit the league's specifications.

On September 19, 1971, the Bears played their first home game at Soldier Field, in which they defeated the Pittsburgh Steelers 17–15. In 1978, the Bears and the Chicago Park District agreed to a 20-year lease and renovation of the stadium; both parties pooled their resources for the renovation. The playing surface was AstroTurf from 1971 until 1987, and was replaced with natural grass in 1988. On February 27, 1987, Soldier Field was designated a National Historic Landmark.

=== Replacement talks ===
In 1989, Soldier Field's future was in jeopardy after a proposal was created for a "McDome", which was intended to be a domed stadium for the Bears, but was rejected by the Illinois Legislature in 1990. Because of this, Bears president Michael McCaskey considered relocation as a possible factor for a new stadium. The Bears had also purchased options in Hoffman Estates, Elk Grove Village and Aurora. In 1995, McCaskey announced that he and Northwest Indiana developers agreed to construction of an entertainment complex called "Planet Park", which would also include a new stadium. However, the plan was rejected by the Lake County Council, and in 1998, then-Chicago mayor Richard M. Daley proposed that the Bears share Comiskey Park with the Chicago White Sox.

=== Renovations ===
Beginning in 1978, the plank seating was replaced by individual seats with backs and armrests. In 1982, a new press box, as well as 60 skyboxes, were added to the stadium, boosting its capacity to 66,030. In 1988, 56 more skyboxes were added, increasing capacity to 66,946. Capacity was slightly increased to 66,950 in 1992. By 1994, however, capacity was slightly reduced to 66,944. During the renovation, seating capacity was reduced to 55,701 by building a grandstand in the open end of the U shape. This moved the field closer to both ends in order to move the fans closer to the field, at the expense of seating capacity. The front row 50-yard line seats were only 55 feet (17 m) away from the sidelines, the shortest distance of all NFL stadiums until MetLife Stadium opened in 2010 with a distance of 46 feet (14 m).

==== 2002–03 renovation and landmark delisting ====
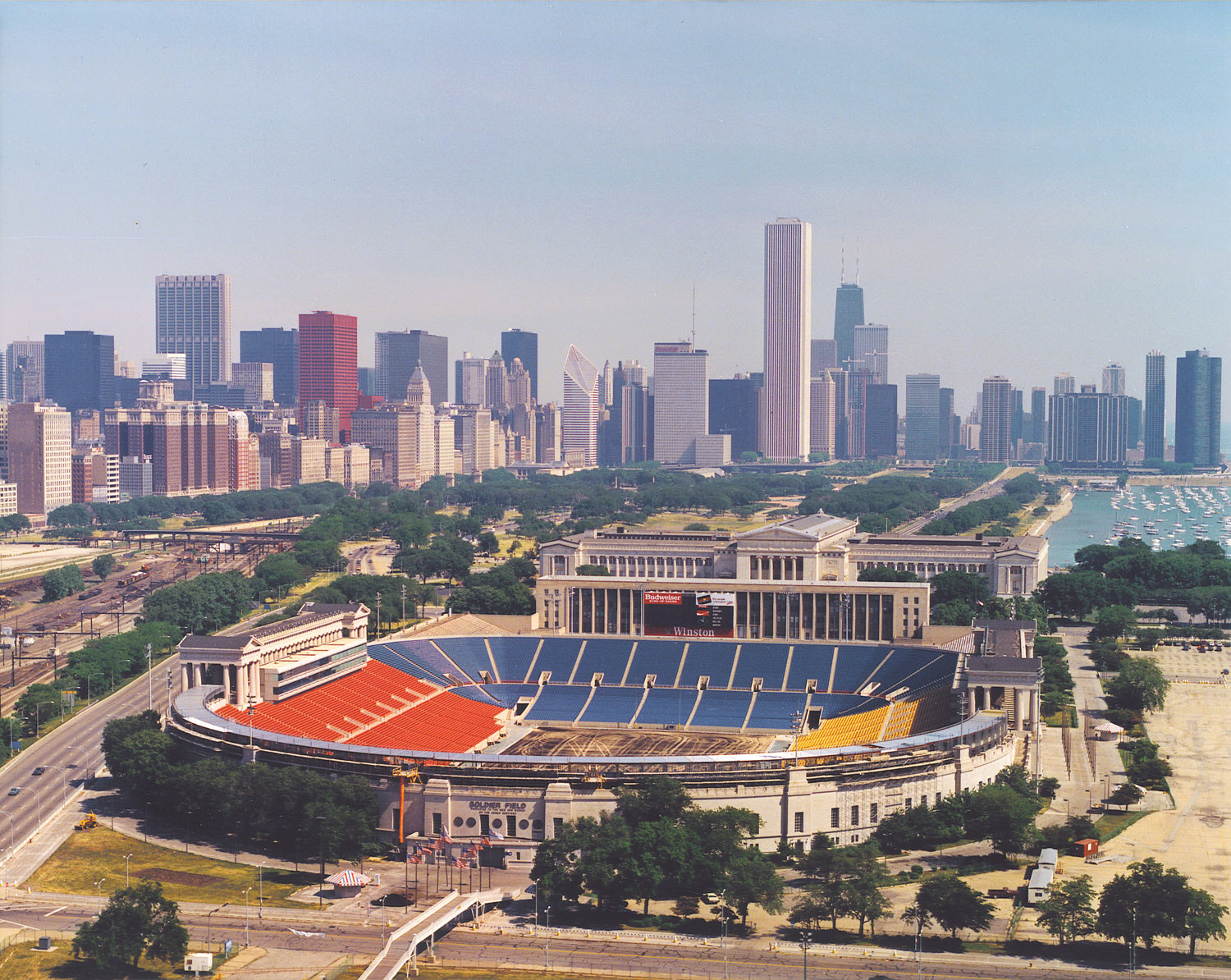
Soldier Field aerial view (1988) before interior redesign

In 2001, the Chicago Park District, which owns the structure, faced substantial criticism when it announced plans to alter the stadium with a design by Benjamin T. Wood and Carlos Zapata of Boston-based architecture firm Wood + Zapata. The stadium grounds were reconfigured by the Chicago architecture firm, Lohan Associates, led by architect Dirk Lohan, grandson of Ludwig Mies van der Rohe. The stadium's interior would be demolished, with a new seating bowl built within the existing walls in an example of facadism. Alice M. Hoffman of Hoffman Management Partners was hired by the Bears just after completion of Ravens Stadium at Camden Yards, and was responsible for bringing together the project team. Her company was the developer's representative for the Bears, and held the contracts for the architects, demolition, and construction companies.

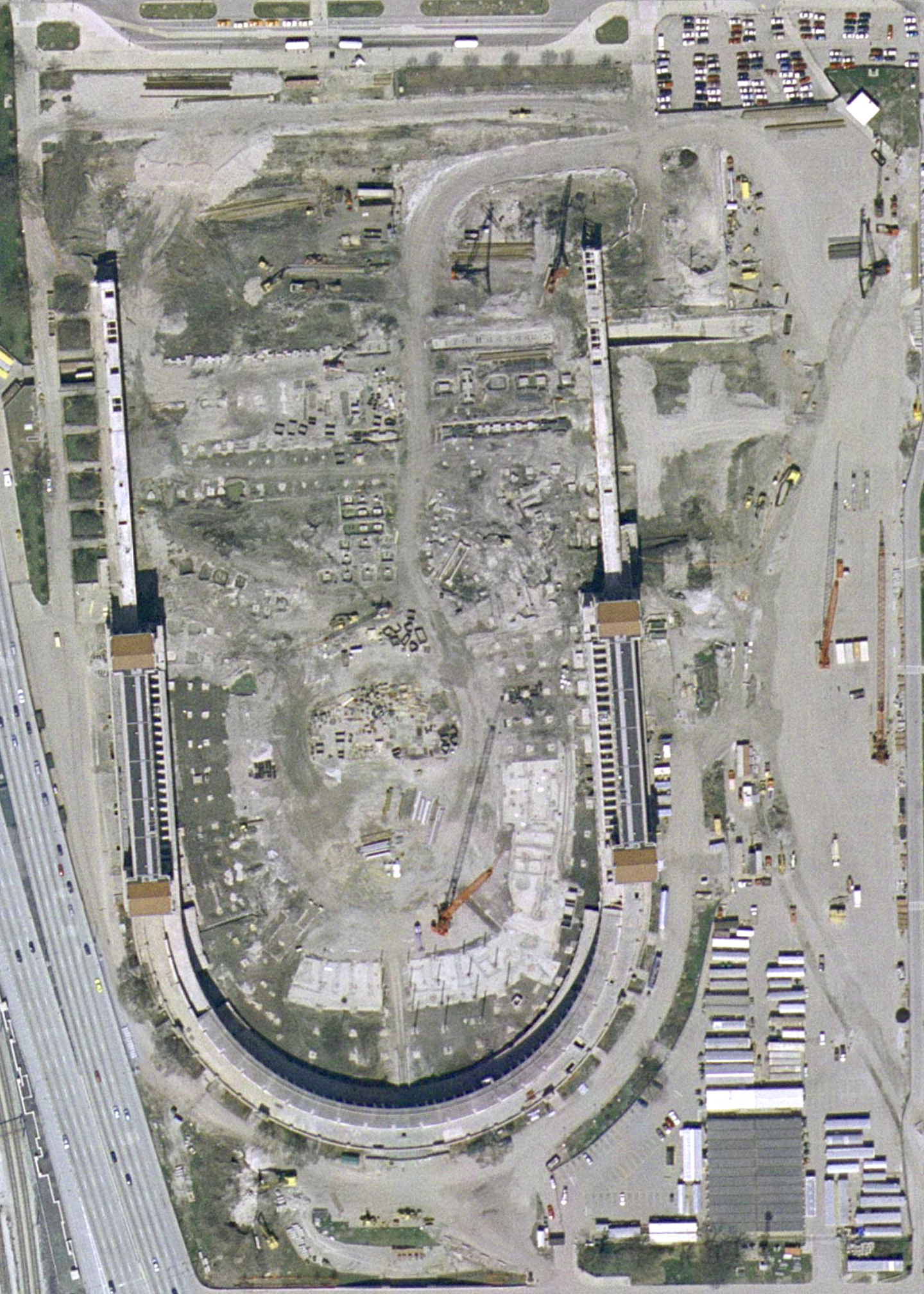
Aerial view of Soldier Field during renovation, April 2002

On January 19, 2002, the night of the Bears' playoff loss to the Philadelphia Eagles, demolition began as tailgate fires still burned in trash cans in the parking lots. The removal of 24,000 stadium seats in 36 hours by Archer Seating Clearinghouse, a speed record never exceeded since, was the first step in building the new Soldier Field. Nostalgic Bears fans recalling the team's glory seasons (especially 1985), as well as some retired players, picked up their seats in the South parking lot. The foremen on the job were Grant Wedding, who installed the seats himself in 1979, and Mark Wretschko, an executive for the factory who made the new seats. As Soldier Field underwent renovation, the Bears spent the 2002 NFL season playing their home games at Memorial Stadium at the University of Illinois. On September 29, 2003, the Bears played their first game at the renovated Soldier Field, in which they were defeated by the Green Bay Packers, 38–23. The total funding for the renovation cost $632 million; taxpayers were responsible for $432 million, while the Bears and the NFL contributed $200 million.

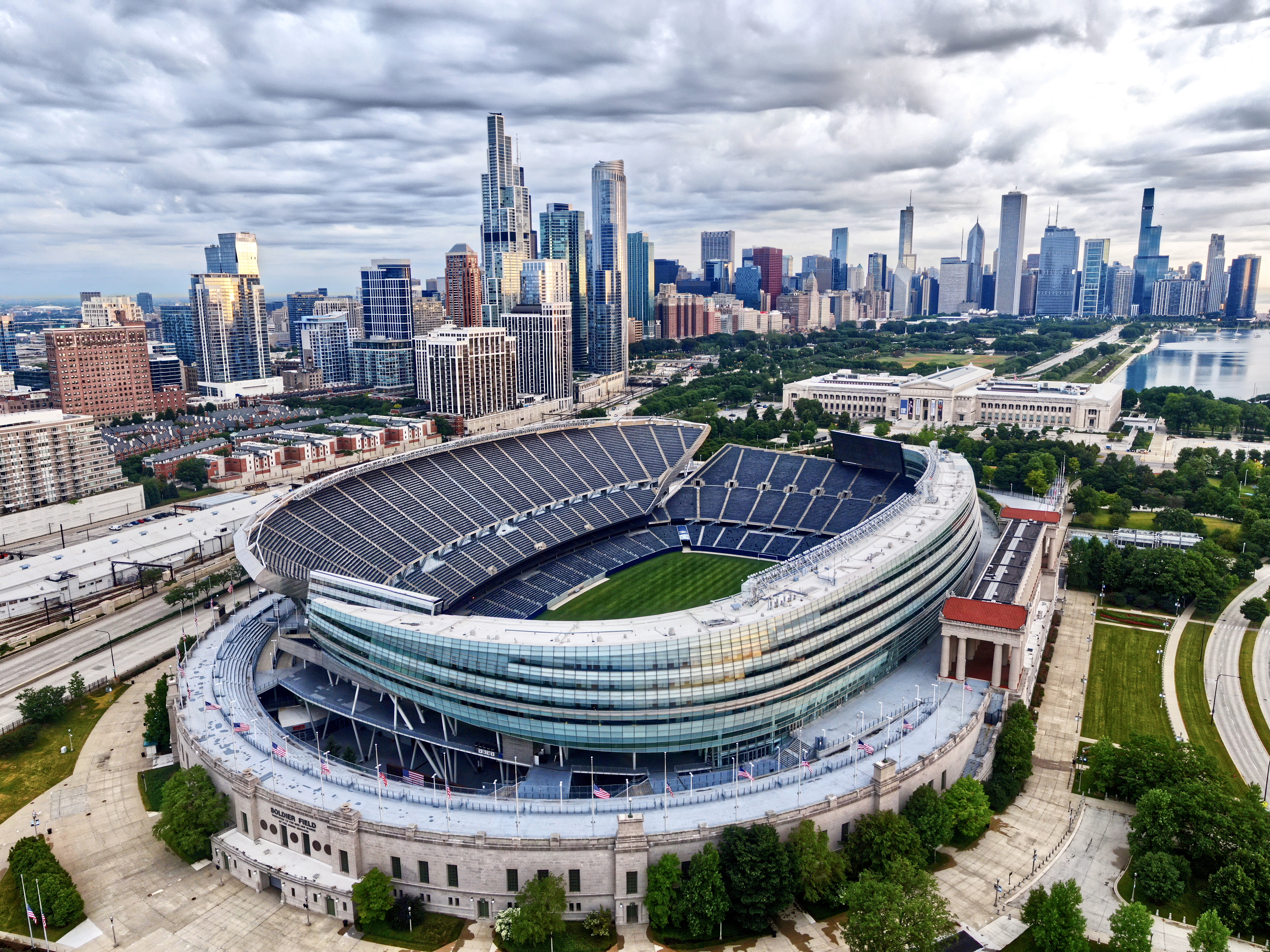
Soldier Field after interior rebuild, with maintained exterior below.

Several writers and columnists lambasted the Soldier Field renovation project as an aesthetic, political, and financial nightmare. The project received mixed reviews within the architecture community, with criticism from civic and preservation groups. Prominent architect and native Chicagoan Stanley Tigerman called it "a fiasco." Chicago Tribune architecture critic Blair Kamin dubbed it the "Eyesore on the Lake Shore," while others called it "Monstrosity on the Midway" or "Mistake by the Lake". The renovation was described by some as if "a spaceship landed on the stadium". Lohan responded:

"It's going to be an ultramodern stadium within the walls of the traditional structure, Why is that so bad? Why does that upset people? … We brainstormed this whole thing and decided to do a contemporary stadium that has all the features and qualities of a new stadium but retains the old façade and colonnades. The fact that the seating bowl is so high and reaches over the colonnades is something that is the direct result of the geometry of the sightlines that are now required for stadiums. That makes the slope of the seating shell the way it is."

Proponents of the renovation argued that it was badly needed because of the stadium's aging and cramped facilities. The New York Times named the renovated Soldier Field one of the five best new buildings of 2003. Soldier Field was given an award in design excellence by the American Institute of Architects in 2004. The stadium received many awards after completion, including project of the year by Midwest Construction Magazine, the Best Open Space Project Award by The Friends of Downtown, and the 2004 Excellence in Structural Engineering Award for "Best Structure" by The Structural Engineers Association of Illinois.

On September 23, 2004, as a result of the renovation, a 10-member federal advisory committee unanimously recommended that Soldier Field be delisted as a National Historic Landmark. The recommendation to delist was prepared by Carol Ahlgren, an architectural historian at the National Park Service's Midwest Regional Office in Omaha, Nebraska, who was quoted in Preservation Online stating, "if we had let this stand, I believe it would have lowered the standard of National Historic Landmarks throughout the country. ... If we want to keep the integrity of the program, let alone the landmarks, we really had no other recourse." The stadium lost the landmark designation on February 17, 2006.

=== Subsequent developments ===
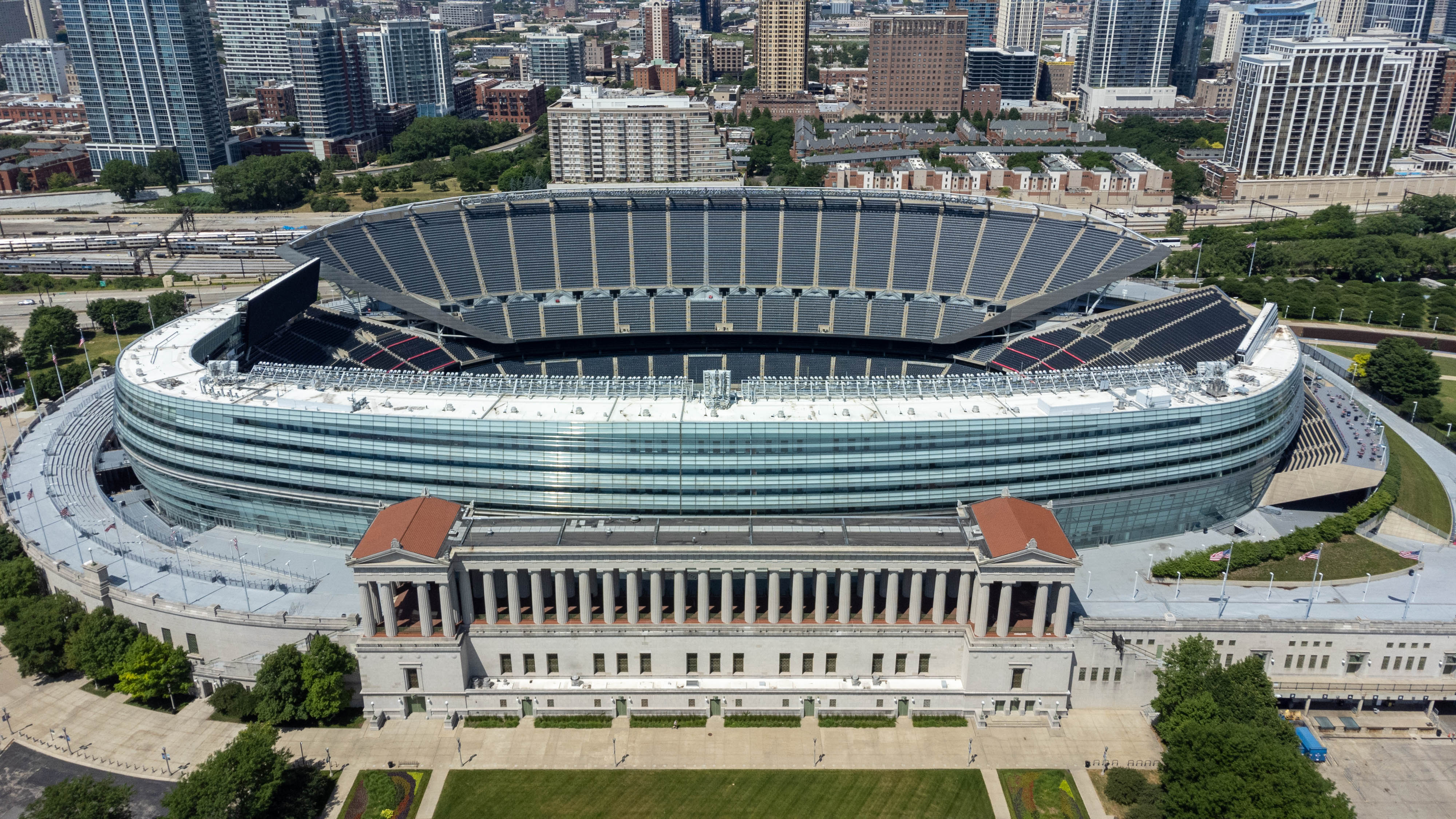
Soldier Field in 2022 from the east

In May 2012, Soldier Field became the first NFL stadium to achieve LEED status, a program intended to award environmentally sustainable buildings.

On July 9, 2019, the Chicago Fire of Major League Soccer (MLS) announced an agreement with the Village of Bridgeview to release the team from their lease with SeatGeek Stadium, where they had played since 2006. As a result, the Fire returned to Soldier Field for the 2020 MLS season.

On June 17, 2021, the Chicago Bears submitted a bid for the Arlington Park Racetrack property, making a move from Soldier Field to a new venue more possible. On September 29, the Bears and Churchill Downs Incorporated announced that they had reached an agreement for the property.

On September 5, 2022, the Kentucky bluegrass was replaced with Bermuda grass after poor field conditions were noted during a preseason game on August 13.

In February 2022, Mayor Lori Lightfoot announced the formation a working group to study and "make recommendations for strategic investments and reimagine Chicago's lakefront collection of iconic cultural venues and open space," inclusive of Soldier Field.

In April 2024, Dirk Lohan released a proposal for a roof structure over the stadium.

== Public transportation ==
The closest Chicago "L" station to Soldier Field is the Roosevelt station on the Orange, Green and Red lines. The Chicago Transit Authority also operates the #128 Soldier Field Express bus route to the stadium from Ogilvie Transportation Center and Union Station. There are also two Metra stations close by: Museum Campus/11th Street station on the Metra Electric District, which also is used by South Shore Line trains, and 18th Street station, which is normally only served by the Metra Electric Line. Pace also provides access from the Northwest, West and Southwest suburbs to the stadium with four express routes from Schaumburg, Lombard, Bolingbrook, Burr Ridge, Palos Heights, and Oak Lawn.

== Facility contracts ==
The pouring rights of non-alcoholic beverages at Soldier Field were held by The Coca-Cola Company from at least 1992 until 2012, when the Bears signed a contract with Dr Pepper Snapple Group (later Keurig Dr Pepper), making it the only stadium in the NFL then (with Cleveland Browns Stadium striking a similar deal in 2018) to have such rights held by the company. With the 2003 renovation, the Bears gained power in striking sponsorship deals at Soldier Field; the Miller Brewing Company was given the pouring rights of alcoholic beverages, while Delaware North Sportservice was named the food and beverage service provider. Aramark took over service operations at the stadium when the latter contract expired in 2013.

== Events ==
=== American football ===
==== Single events ====
Soldier Field during the 1926 Army–Navy Game

- The stadium hosted its first football game on October 4, 1924, between Louisville Male High School and Chicago's Austin Community Academy High School; Louisville's team won 26–0.
- Over 100,000 spectators attended the 1926 Army–Navy Game. It would decide the national championship, as Navy entered undefeated and Army had lost only to Notre Dame. The game lived up to its hype, and even though it ended in a 21–21 tie, Navy was awarded the national championship.
- The all-time collegiate attendance record of 123,000+ was established November 26, 1927, as Notre Dame beat the USC Trojans 7–6. Subsequently, in 2016, 150,000+ attended a game between the Virginia Tech Hokies and Tennessee Volunteers at Bristol Speedway.
- Austin defeated Leo to win the 1937 Chicago Prep Bowl; another contender for the highest attendance ever (estimated at over 120,000 spectators). The Chicago Prep Bowl games are held at Soldier Field yearly on the day after Thanksgiving. The bowl game is older than the IHSA state championship tournament held since the 1960s.
- The stadium was host to 41 College All-Star Games, an exhibition between the previous year's NFL champion (or, in its final years, Super Bowl champion) and a team of collegiate all-star players prior to their reporting to their new professional teams training camps. This game was discontinued after the 1976 NFL season. The final game in 1976 was halted in the third quarter when a torrential thunderstorm broke out and play was never resumed.
- The University of Notre Dame has hosted two games at Soldier Field, as part of their Shamrock Series. The first was in 2012, against the University of Miami, with another, against the University of Wisconsin-Madison, following in 2021.

==== NFL playoffs ====
- 1985 NFC Divisional Playoff: New York Giants 0, Chicago Bears 21. The last home playoff game was in 1963, when the team played in Wrigley Field.
- 1985 NFC Championship Game: Los Angeles Rams 0, Chicago Bears 24. This was the first NFC Championship held here.
- 1986 NFC Divisional Playoff: Washington 27, Chicago Bears 13.
- 1987 NFC Divisional Playoff: Washington 21, Chicago 17.
- 1988 NFC Divisional Playoff: Philadelphia Eagles 12, Chicago Bears 20. This game is best remembered as the Fog Bowl, where a dense fog covered the stadium, reducing visibility to 15–20 yards.
- 1988 NFC Championship Game: San Francisco 49ers 28, Bears 3. The 49ers would then go on to win Super Bowl XXIII.
- 1990 NFC Wild Card: New Orleans Saints 6, Chicago Bears 16.
- 1991 NFC Wild Card: Dallas Cowboys 17, Chicago Bears 13.
- 2001 NFC Divisional Playoff: Philadelphia Eagles 33, Chicago Bears 19. This was also the last home game before the renovations took place in 2002.
- 2005 NFC Divisional Playoff: Carolina Panthers 29, Chicago Bears 21. First playoff game post-renovations.
- 2006 NFC Divisional Playoff: Seattle Seahawks 24, Chicago Bears 27 (OT).
- 2006 NFC Championship Game: New Orleans Saints 14, Bears 39. Granted the team their second trip to the Super Bowl (their first in 21 years), where they lost to the Colts 29-17 in a rainy Miami.
- 2010 NFC Divisional Playoff: Seattle Seahawks 24, Chicago Bears 35.
- 2010 NFC Championship Game: Green Bay Packers 21, Bears 14. The Bears were defeated by the eventual Super Bowl XLV champions.
- 2018 NFC Wild Card: Philadelphia Eagles 16, Chicago Bears 15. This game is known for its "Double Doink" field goal.
- 2025 NFC Wild Card: Chicago Bears 31, Green Bay Packers 27.
- 2025 NFC Divisional Playoff: Los Angeles Rams 20, Chicago Bears 17 (OT).

==== College football ====
The Northern Illinois Huskies play select games at Soldier Field, all of which have featured them hosting a team from the Big Ten Conference. Northern Illinois University (NIU) is located in DeKalb, 65 miles (105 km) to the west on Interstate 88.

- On September 1, 2007, NIU faced the University of Iowa in the first Division I College Football game at Soldier Field since the 2002 renovations. The Hawkeyes defeated the Huskies 16–3.
- On September 17, 2011, the Huskies returned to play the Wisconsin Badgers in a game that was called "Soldier Field Showdown II". The eventual Big Ten champion Badgers topped NIU 49–7.
- On September 1, 2012, NIU hosted the Iowa Hawkeyes in a season opener that was called "Soldier Field Showdown III". The Hawkeyes narrowly defeated the Huskies 18–17.

Notre Dame Fighting Irish football used the stadium as home field for the 1929 season while Notre Dame Stadium was being constructed. The school has used Soldier Field for single games on occasion both prior to and since the 1929 season, and boasts an undefeated 10–0–2 record there. At Soldier Field, Notre Dame has played Northwestern four times, USC and Wisconsin twice, and Army, Drake, Great Lakes Naval Base, Navy, and Miami once each.

=== Motorsport ===
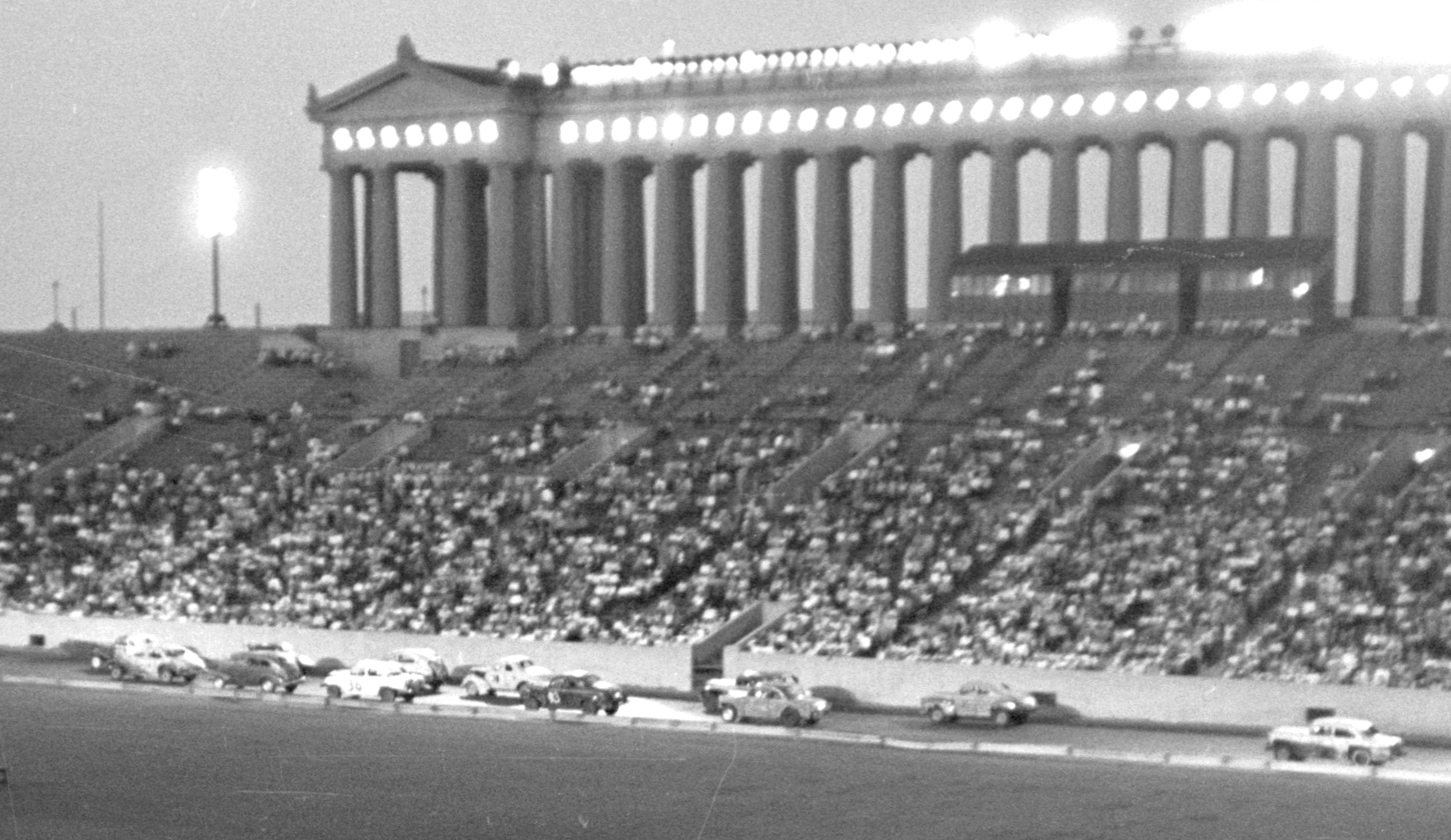
Motorsport race at Soldier Field in 1951

Beginning in the 1940s and through the late-1960s (except for during World War II), motorsport races regularly were held on a short track at the stadium. In 1956 and 1957, NASCAR held races at the stadium, including a NASCAR Cup race.

The early-to-mid 1980s saw the US Hot Rod Association host Truck and Tractor Sled Pull Competitions and Monster Truck exhibitions here. The engines on some of the vehicles would echo through the skyscrapers in downtown Chicago as they made their pull. Damage to the stadium turf on a few of the event occasion's led USHRA to move events to the Rosemont Horizon (known today as Allstate Arena).

=== Ice hockey ===
On February 7, 2013, the stadium hosted a high school hockey game between St. Rita High School from the city's Southwest side and Fenwick High School from suburban Oak Park.

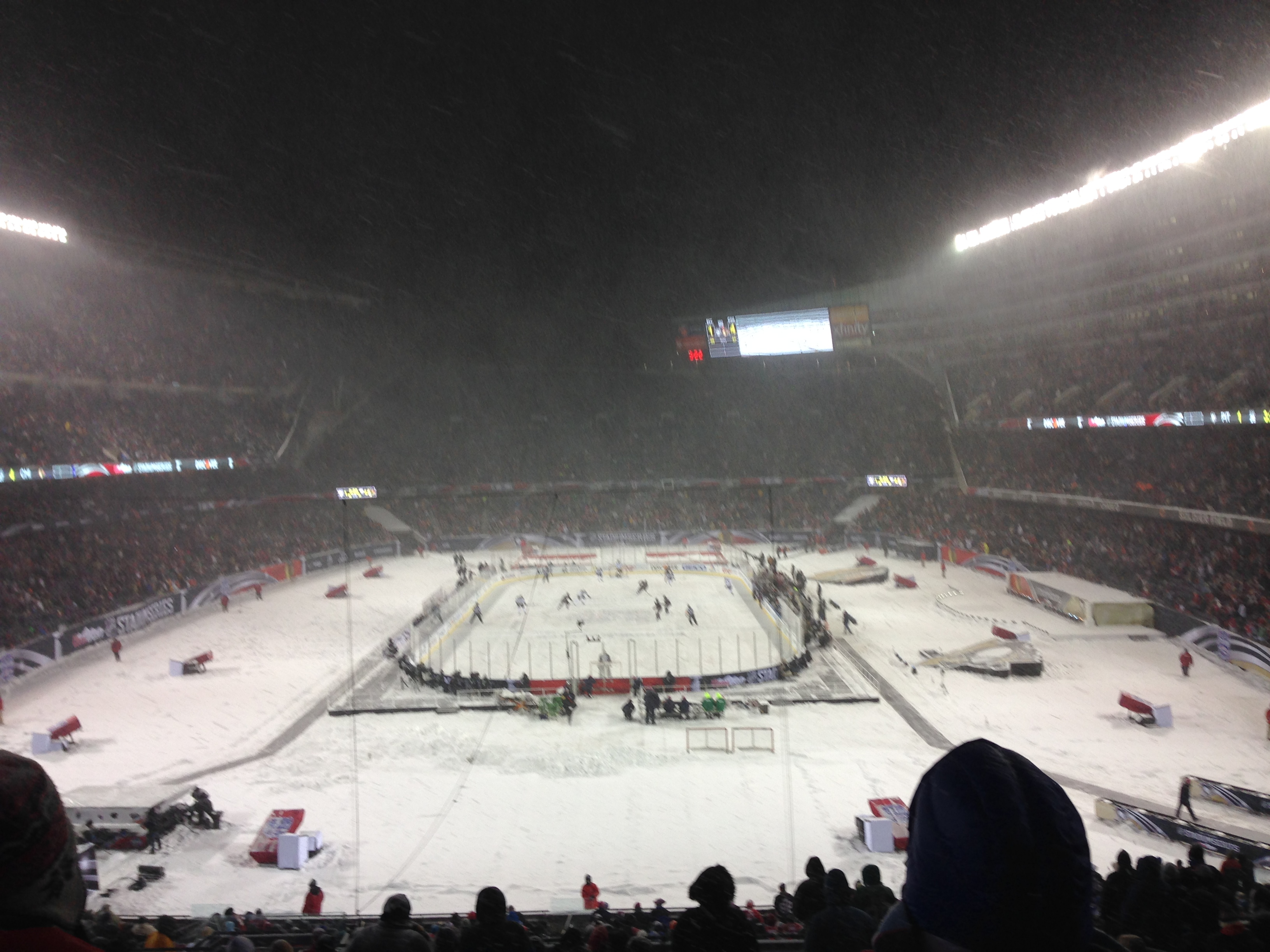
Soldier Field during the 2014 NHL Stadium Series between the Chicago Blackhawks and the Pittsburgh Penguins

The Notre Dame Fighting Irish and Miami RedHawks played a doubleheader on February 17, 2013, with the Wisconsin Badgers and Minnesota Golden Gophers in the Hockey City Classic, the first outdoor hockey game in the history of the stadium. A Chicago Gay Hockey Association intra-squad game was held in affiliation with the Hockey City Classic.

On March 1, 2014, the Chicago Blackhawks played against the Pittsburgh Penguins as part of the NHL Stadium Series. The Blackhawks defeated the Penguins 5–1 before a sold-out crowd of 62,921. The team also held its 2015 Stanley Cup Championship celebration at the stadium instead of Grant Park, where other city championships have typically been held, due to recent rains.

On February 7, 2015, Soldier Field hosted another edition of the Hockey City Classic. The event had been delayed due to unusually warm weather (42 °F (6 °C)) and complications with the quality of the ice. The 2015 edition of the Hockey City Classic featured a match between Miami University and Western Michigan, followed by a match between the Big Ten's Michigan and Michigan State On February 5, the organizers of the Hockey City Classic organized the Unite on the Ice event benefiting St. Jude Children's Research Hospital. The event was centered upon a celebrity hockey game with former NHL and AHL players, as well as a public free skate at Soldier Field. Participants in the celebrity game included Éric Dazé, Jamal Mayers and Gino Cavallini. Denis Savard was in attendance, serving as an honorary coach during the game. On February 15, 2015, Soldier Field hosted another Chicago Gay Hockey Association intra-league match in association with the Hockey City Classic.

Date	Away team	Result	Home team	Spectators
February 7, 2013	St. Rita High School	0–3	Fenwick High School	unknown
February 17, 2013	Miami (OH)	1–2	Notre Dame	52,051
February 17, 2013	Minnesota	2–3	Wisconsin	52,051
March 1, 2014	Pittsburgh Penguins	1–5	Chicago Blackhawks	62,921
February 7, 2015	Miami (OH)	4–3	Western Michigan	22,751
February 7, 2015	Michigan State	1–4	Michigan	22,751

=== Soccer ===
==== 1994 FIFA World Cup ====
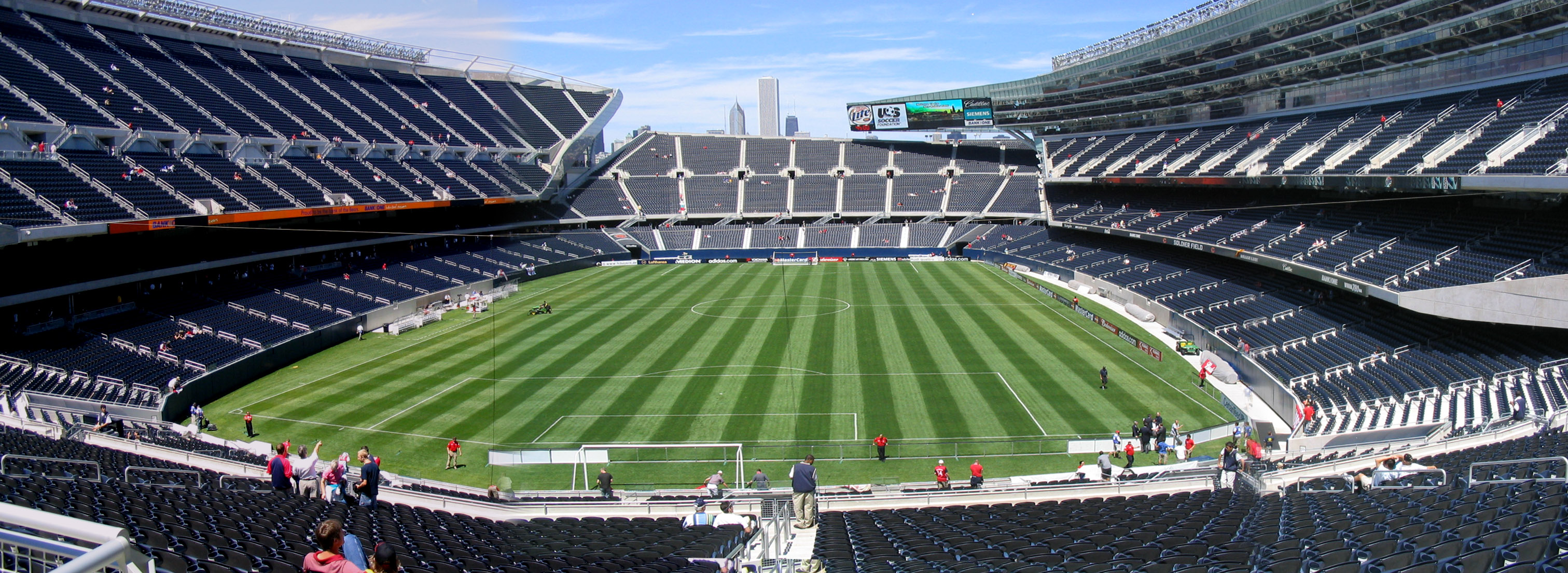
Soldier Field before a soccer game, 2004

Date	Time (CDT)	Team #1	Result	Team #2	Round	Spectators
June 17, 1994	2:00PM	Germany	1–0	Bolivia	Group C (opening match)	63,117
June 21, 1994	3:00PM	Germany	1–1	Spain	Group C	63,113
June 26, 1994	11:30AM	Greece	0–4	Bulgaria	Group D	63,160
June 27, 1994	3:00PM	Bolivia	1–3	Spain	Group C	63,089
July 2, 1994	11:00AM	Germany	3–2	Belgium	Round of 16	60,246

==== 1999 FIFA Women's World Cup ====
Date	Time (CDT)	Team #1	Result	Team #2	Round	Spectators
June 24, 1999	17.00	Brazil	2–0	Italy	Group B	65,080
June 24, 1999	19.00	United States	7–1	Nigeria	Group A	65,080
June 26, 1999	16.00	Ghana	0–2	Sweden	Group D	34,256
June 26, 1999	18.30	Norway	4–0	Japan	Group C	34,256

==== CONCACAF Gold Cups ====
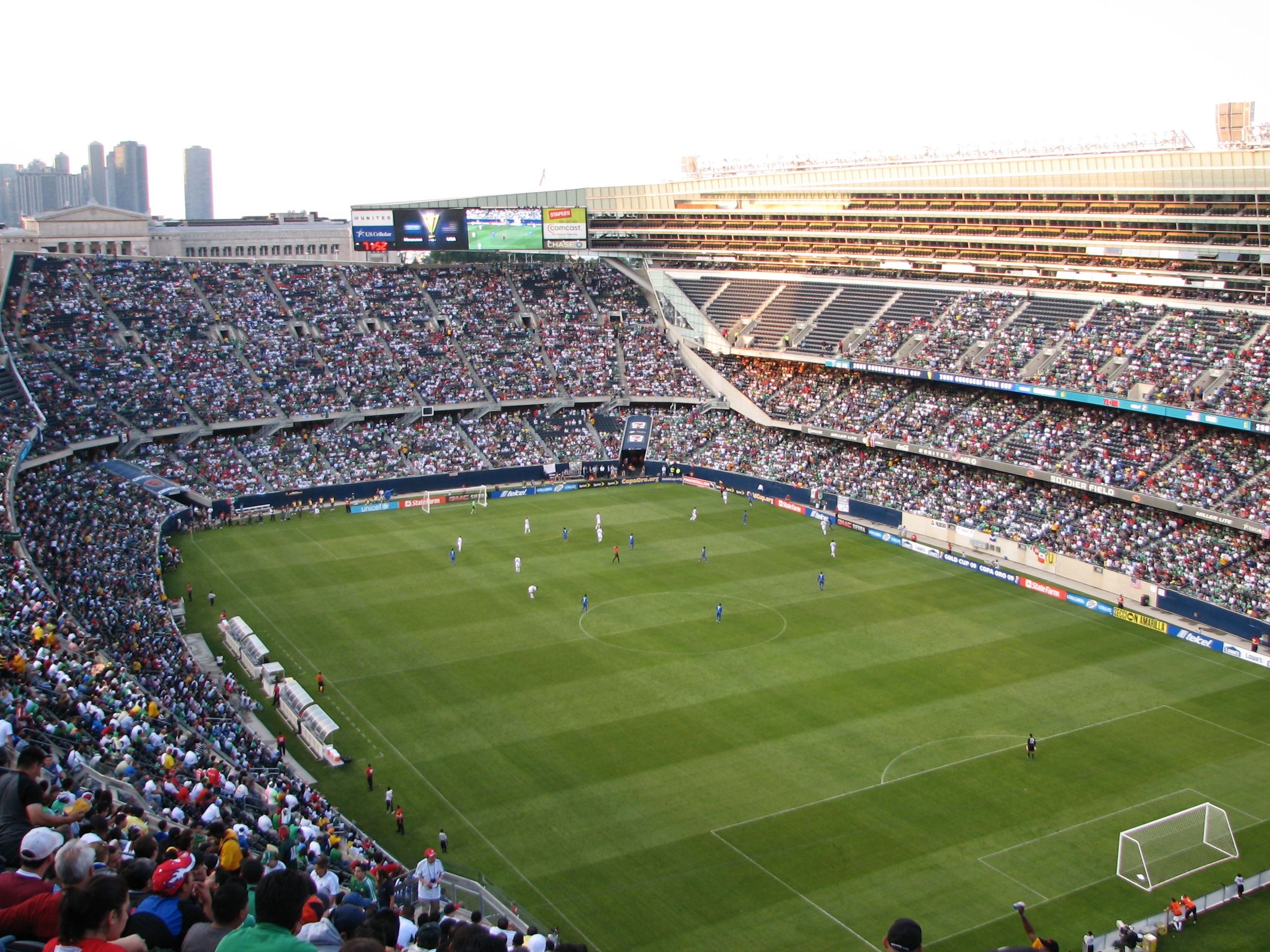
Soldier Field during the 2009 CONCACAF Gold Cup

2007 CONCACAF Gold Cup

Date	Team #1	Result	Team #2	Round	Spectators
21 June 2007	Canada	1–2	United States	Semifinals	50,760
21 June 2007	Mexico	1–0	Guadeloupe	Semifinals	50,760
June 24, 2007	United States	2–1	Mexico	Final	60,000

2009 CONCACAF Gold Cup

Date	Team #1	Result	Team #2	Round	Spectators
23 July 2009	Honduras	1–2	United States	Semifinals	55,173
23 July 2009	Costa Rica	1–1 (3–5 pen)	Mexico	Semifinals	55,173

2011 CONCACAF Gold Cup

Date	Team #1	Result	Team #2	Round	Spectators
12 June 2011	El Salvador	6–1	Cuba	Group A	62,000
12 June 2011	Mexico	4–1	Costa Rica	Group A	62,000

2013 CONCACAF Gold Cup

Date	Team #1	Result	Team #2	Round	Spectators
July 28, 2013	United States	1–0	Panama	Final	57,920

2015 CONCACAF Gold Cup

Date	Team #1	Result	Team #2	Round	Spectators
July 9, 2015	Trinidad and Tobago	3–1	Guatemala	Group C	54,126
July 9, 2015	Mexico	6–0	Cuba	Group C	54,126

2019 CONCACAF Gold Cup

Date	Time (CDT)	Team #1	Result	Team #2	Round	Spectators
July 7, 2019	8:15 PM	Mexico	1–0	United States	Final	62,493

2023 CONCACAF Gold Cup

Date	Time (CDT)	Team #1	Result	Team #2	Round	Spectators
June 24, 2023	9:06 PM	United States	1–1	Jamaica	Group A	36,666

==== Copa América Centenario ====
Date	Time (CDT)	Team #1	Result	Team #2	Round	Spectators
June 5, 2016	4:00PM	Jamaica	0–1	Venezuela	Group C	25,560
June 7, 2016	7:00PM	United States	4–0	Costa Rica	Group A	39,642
June 10, 2016	8:30PM	Argentina	5–0	Panama	Group D	53,885
June 22, 2016	7:00PM	Colombia	0–2	Chile	Semi-finals	55,423

==== Single events ====
- Over 15,000 spectators attended the first leg of the 1928 National Challenge Cup (now known as the U.S. Open Cup) between soccer teams Bricklayers and Masons F.C. of Chicago and New York Nationals of New York City. The match ended in a 1–1 tie, and New York won the second leg 3–0 in New York City.
- Numerous Men's and Women's National Team friendly matches.
- Liverpool vs Olympiacos in the 2014 International Champions Cup, with Liverpool winning 1–0.
- Manchester United vs. Paris Saint-Germain in the 2015 International Champions Cup, with PSG winning 2–0.
- Bayern Munich vs. Milan in the 2016 International Champions Cup, with the game ending in a 3–3 draw and Milan winning the penalty shoot-out 5–3.
- Site of the 2017 MLS All-Star Game, played on August 2, 2017, between Real Madrid and a group of all-stars representing Major League Soccer.
- Manchester City vs. Borussia Dortmund in the 2018 International Champions Cup, with Borussia Dortmund winning 1–0.
- Venue for the 2019 CONCACAF Gold Cup final, with Mexico defeating the United States 1–0.
- During the 2025 Major League Soccer season, a crowd of 62,358 spectators set the record for the highest attendance at a soccer match as the Chicago Fire drew 0–0 with Inter Miami, with the latter team starring Lionel Messi as a starter, along with Sergio Busquets, Jordi Alba and Luis Suárez. Chicago's 1–1 draw with Inter Miami in the subsequent 2026 season then broke this record with an attendance of 63,094.

=== Special Olympics ===
The first Special Olympics games were held at Soldier Field on July 20, 1968. The games involved over 1,000 people with intellectual disabilities from 26 U.S. states and Canada competing in track and field and swimming. In 1970, the second international games occurred, when Special Olympics returned to Soldier Field.

=== Rugby union ===
On November 1, 2014, the stadium hosted its first international rugby union test match between the United States Eagles and New Zealand All Blacks as part of the 2014 end-of-year rugby union tests. Over half of the 61,500 tickets were sold within two days. The All Blacks beat the Eagles 74–6. The stadium hosted its second international rugby union match on September 5, 2015, with the United States hosting Australia as part of the 2015 Rugby World Cup warm-up matches shortly before both teams were due to travel to England for the 2015 Rugby World Cup. The Eagles were defeated 47–10. On November 5, 2016, Ireland beat New Zealand 40–29 at Soldier Field as part of the 2016 end-of-year rugby union internationals – the very first time Ireland had beaten the All Blacks in a test match in 111 years of play.

Date	Winner	Score	Opponent	Attendance
November 1, 2014	New Zealand	74–6	United States	61,500
September 5, 2015	Australia	47–10	United States	23,212
November 5, 2016	Ireland	40–29	New Zealand	60,000
November 3, 2018	New Zealand women's team	67–6	United States women's team	30,051
November 3, 2018	Ireland	54–7	Italy	30,051
November 3, 2018	Māori All Blacks	59–22	United States	30,051
November 1, 2025	New Zealand	26-13	Ireland	61,841

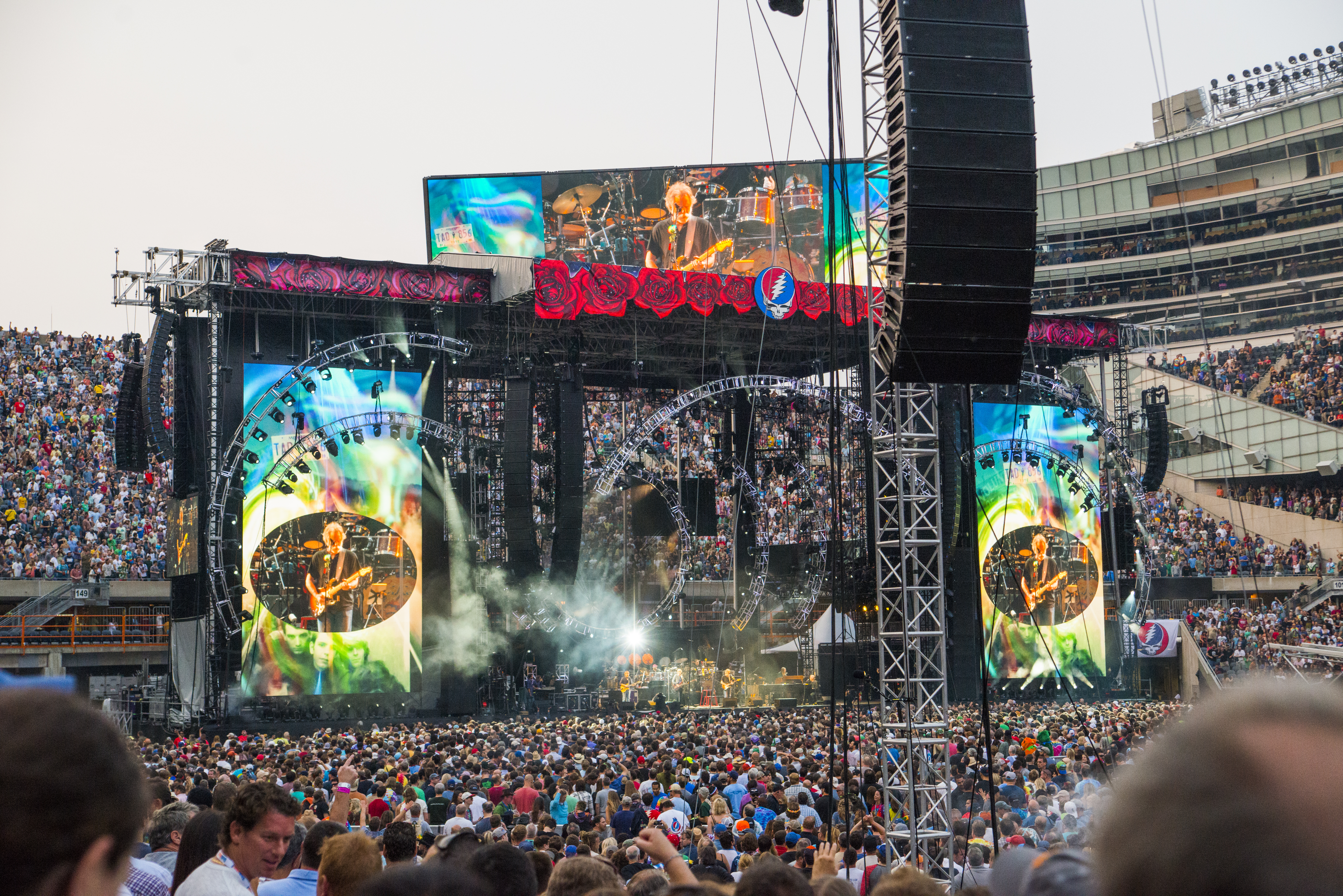
Soldier Field during the Fare Thee Well: Celebrating 50 Years of the Grateful Dead tour, 2015

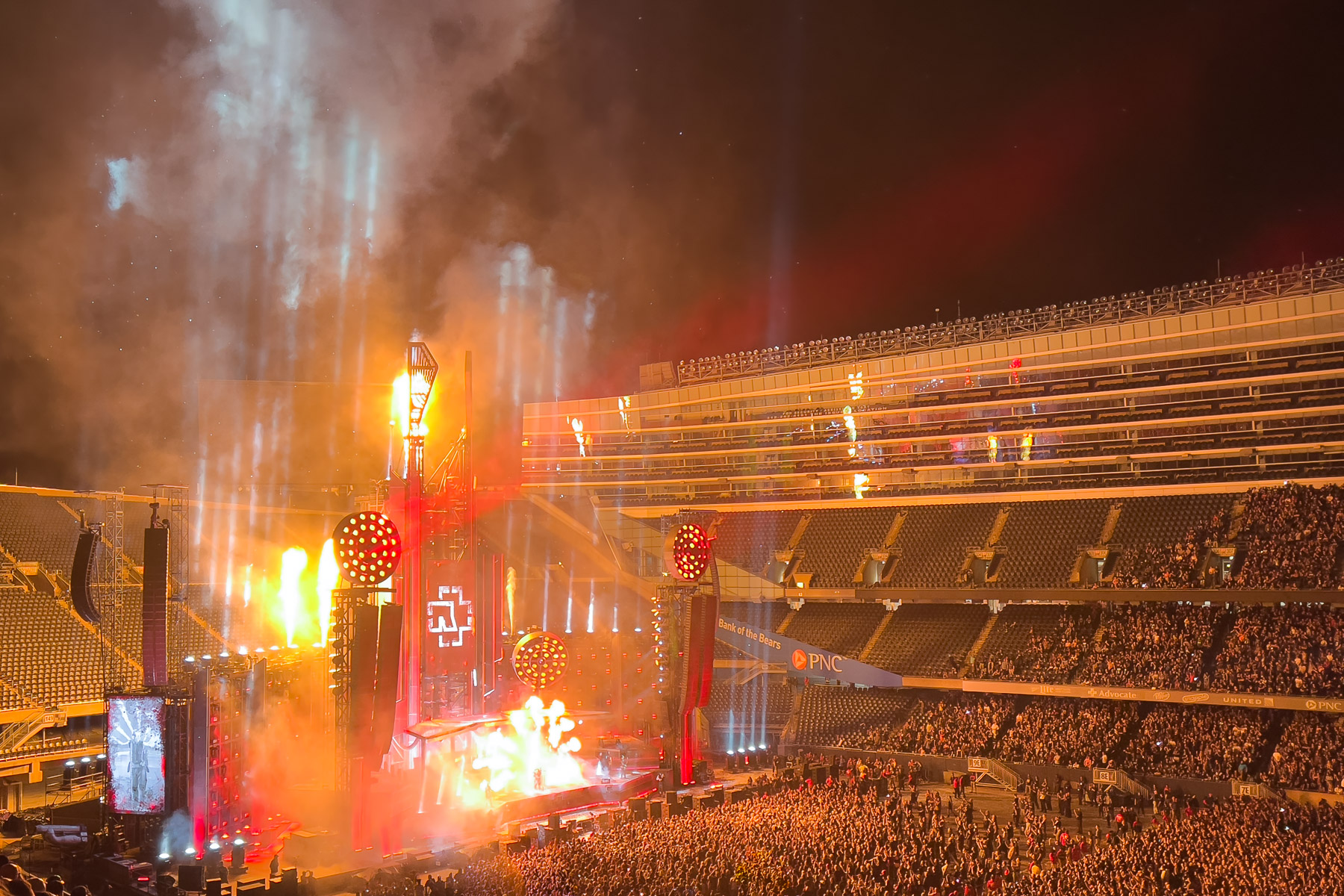
Rammstein performs at Soldier Field as part of their North America Stadium Tour, 2022

=== Concerts ===
Date	Artist	Opening Act(s)	Tour / concert name	Attendance / Capacity	Revenue	Notes
August 21, 1937	Lily Pons; Rudy Vallee; Jascha Heifetz; Bobby Breen	—N/a	Chicagoland Music Festival	—N/a	—N/a	
August 15, 1964	Johnny Cash; June Carter	—N/a	Chicagoland Music Festival	—N/a	—N/a	
August 9, 1966	Barbra Streisand	—N/a	An Evening with Barbra Streisand Tour	—N/a	—N/a	First solo headliner
July 18, 1970	Performers: Chicago; Illinois Speed Press; The Illusion; Pig Iron; Iggy Pop and The Stooges; Dream; Leon Russell; MC5; Funkadelic; Mason Proffit; Bush; Happy Day; It Doesn't Matter; Joe Kelley Blues Band; Bloomsbury People	—N/a	WCFL's Big Ten Summer Music Festival	—N/a	—N/a	
June 4, 1977	Emerson, Lake & Palmer	Foghat; The J. Geils Band; Climax Blues Band	ELP Works/Super Bowl of Rock #1	63,848 / 65,000	$647,172	
June 19, 1977	Pink Floyd		In the Flesh Tour	67,000 / 67,000	$670,000	
July 9, 1977	Lynyrd Skynyrd	Point Blank		77,197	—N/a	
July 10, 1977	Ted Nugent	Lynyrd Skynyrd; REO Speedwagon; Journey.38 Special	Super Bowl of Rock #3	63,870 / 65,000	$627,995	First solo male headliner
August 13, 1977	Peter Frampton	Bob Seger and the Silver Bullet Band; Rick Derringer; UFO	Super Bowl of Rock #4	47,365 / 65,000	$476,007	
September 24, 1977	Chicago	—N/a	Lincoln Park Zoo Benefit	—N/a	—N/a	
July 8, 1978	The Rolling Stones	Journey; Southside Johnny & The Asbury Jukes; Peter Tosh	The Rolling Stones US Tour 1978	70,725 / 70,725	$919,425	
August 26, 1978	Parliament-Funkadelic	The Bar-Kays; Con Funk Shun; A Taste of Honey	Funk Fest	—N/a	—N/a	
July 19, 1980	Smokey Robinson	The O'Jays	Budweiser Superfest	41,322 / 58,000	$702,474	
August 10–18, 1983	Performers: Buddy Guy; Junior Wells; The Beach Boys; Stevie Ray Vaughan and Double Trouble; The Association; The Hollies; The Kind; Laura Branigan	—N/a	ChicagoFest	—N/a	—N/a	
August 9, 1985	Bruce Springsteen and the E Street Band	—N/a	Born in the U.S.A. Tour	71,222 / 71,222	$1,228,500	
July 31, 1987	Madonna	Level 42	Who's That Girl World Tour	47,407 / 47,407	$1,066,658	
July 29, 1990	Paul McCartney	—N/a	The Paul McCartney World Tour	55,630 / 55,630	$1,807,975	
June 22, 1991	Grateful Dead	—N/a	Summer Tour 1991	58,416 / 58,416	$1,573,891	
June 25, 1992	Grateful Dead	Steve Miller Band	Summer Tour 1992	110,670 / 118,394	$3,116,492	
June 26, 1992	Grateful Dead	Steve Miller Band	Summer Tour 1992	110,670 / 118,394	$3,116,492	
June 18, 1993	Grateful Dead	Sting	Summer Tour 1993	115,239 / 115,239	$3,041,690	
June 19, 1993	Grateful Dead	Sting	Summer Tour 1993	115,239 / 115,239	$3,041,690	
July 12, 1994	Pink Floyd	—N/a	The Division Bell Tour	51,981 / 51,981	$2,056,105	
July 23, 1994	Grateful Dead	Traffic	Summer Tour 1994	111,002 / 111,002	$3,546,758	
July 24, 1994	Grateful Dead	Traffic	Summer Tour 1994	111,002 / 111,002	$3,546,758	
September 11, 1994	The Rolling Stones	Lenny Kravitz	Voodoo Lounge Tour	90,303 / 90,303	$4,194,320	
September 12, 1994	The Rolling Stones	Lenny Kravitz	Voodoo Lounge Tour	90,303 / 90,303	$4,194,320	
July 8, 1995	Grateful Dead	The Band	Summer Tour 1995	113,327 / 113,327	$3,694,431	
July 9, 1995	Grateful Dead	The Band	Summer Tour 1995	113,327 / 113,327	$3,694,431	Final concert by the band.
July 11, 1995	Pearl Jam	Bad Religion; Otis Rush	Vitalogy Tour	47,824 / 47,824	$1,028,216	Played on the Grateful Dead's stage
September 14, 1996	Little Feat	Taj Mahal		—N/a	—N/a	
June 27, 1997	U2	Fun Lovin' Criminals	PopMart Tour	116,912 / 127,500	$5,956,587	
June 28, 1997	U2	Fun Lovin' Criminals	PopMart Tour	116,912 / 127,500	$5,956,587	
June 29, 1997	U2	Fun Lovin' Criminals	PopMart Tour	116,912 / 127,500	$5,956,587	
July 18, 1997	Performers: Bad Religion; Blink-182; Descendents; Hed PE; Jimmy 2 Times; Lagwagon; Latex Generation; Less Than Jake; Limp Bizkit; The Mighty Mighty Bosstones; Millencolin; Murder City Devils; Orange 9mm; Pennywise; Reel Big Fish; Sick of It All; Snot; Social Distortion; Strung Out; Sugar Ray; Trading Bryson; Vision of Disorder; White Kaps	—N/a	Vans Warped Tour	—N/a	—N/a	
September 23, 1997	The Rolling Stones	Blues Traveler	Bridges to Babylon Tour	107,186 / 107,186	$6,260,000	
September 25, 1997	The Rolling Stones	Blues Traveler	Bridges to Babylon Tour	107,186 / 107,186	$6,260,000	
May 10, 1998	George Strait	—N/a	Country Music Festival Tour	45,486 / 45,486	$1,813,825	
April 25, 1999	George Strait	—N/a	Country Music Festival Tour	36,022 / 36,022	$1,402,194	
May 13, 2000	Wilco	—N/a		—N/a	—N/a	
June 29, 2000	Dave Matthews Band	Ben Harper and the Innocent Criminals; Ozomatli	The Summer 2000 Tour	115,006 / 115,006	$5,175,270	
June 30, 2000	Dave Matthews Band	Ben Harper and the Innocent Criminals; Ozomatli	The Summer 2000 Tour	115,006 / 115,006	$5,175,270	
June 16, 2001	NSYNC	BBMak; 3LW; Dream	PopOdyssey	85,650 / 103,903	$4,739,359	
June 17, 2001	NSYNC	BBMak; 3LW; Dream	PopOdyssey	85,650 / 103,903	$4,739,359	
July 6, 2001	Dave Matthews Band	Buddy Guy; Angélique Kidjo	The Summer 2001 Tour	103,675 / 103,675	$4,834,864	
July 7, 2001	Dave Matthews Band	Buddy Guy; Angélique Kidjo	The Summer 2001 Tour	103,675 / 103,675	$4,834,864	
September 10, 2005	The Rolling Stones	Los Lonely Boys	A Bigger Bang	55,046 / 55,046	$7,231,427	
July 21, 2006	Bon Jovi	Nickelback	Have a Nice Day Tour	52,612 / 52,612	$3,988,455	
October 11, 2006	The Rolling Stones	Elvis Costello and the Imposters	A Bigger Bang	33,296 / 33,296	$4,020,721	
June 21, 2008	Kenny Chesney	Keith Urban; LeAnn Rimes; Luke Bryan; Gary Allan	The Poets and Pirates Tour	46,463 / 48,585	$4,063,663	
October 11–12, 2008	Performers: Son Volt; Cross Canadian Ragweed; Gretchen Wilson; Justin Townes Earle; Lady Antebellum; Luke Bryan; Rissi Palmer; Taylor Swift; The Lawrence Peters Outfit; Tift Merritt	—N/a	Chicago Country Music Festival	—N/a	—N/a	
June 13, 2009	Kenny Chesney	Lady Antebellum; Miranda Lambert; Montgomery Gentry; Sugarland	Sun City Carnival Tour	48,763 / 50,109	$3,184,606	
September 12, 2009	U2	Snow Patrol	U2 360° Tour	135,872 / 135,872	$13,860,480	
September 13, 2009	U2	Snow Patrol	U2 360° Tour	135,872 / 135,872	$13,860,480	
June 12, 2010	Performers: All Time Low; Boys Like Girls; Cady Groves; Forever the Sickest Kids; Good Charlotte; Hellogoodbye; LMFAO; Simple Plan; Third Eye Blind; Drive A; Great Big Planes; Mercy Mercedes; The Prices; The Ready Set; Stereo Skyline; Vita Chambers	—N/a	The Bamboozle Roadshow 2010	—N/a	—N/a	Event held in parking lot
June 19, 2010	Eagles	Dixie Chicks; JD & the Straight Shot	Long Road Out of Eden Tour	29,233 / 32,420	$3,186,493	
July 7, 2010	deadmau5	Rye Rye; Brazilian Girls		—N/a	—N/a	
July 30, 2010	Bon Jovi	Kid Rock	The Circle Tour	95,959 / 95,959	$8,606,259	
July 31, 2010	Bon Jovi	Kid Rock	The Circle Tour	95,959 / 95,959	$8,606,259	
July 5, 2011	U2	Interpol	U2 360° Tour	64,297 / 64,297	$5,786,335	
August 23, 2011	Wayne Baker Brooks	Sugar Blue		—N/a	—N/a	
July 7, 2012	Kenny Chesney; Tim McGraw	Jake Owen; Grace Potter and the Nocturnals	Brothers of the Sun Tour	51,100 / 51,100	$5,109,399	
July 12, 2013	Bon Jovi	The J. Geils Band	Because We Can	45,178 / 45,178	$4,690,204	
July 22, 2013	Jay-Z; Justin Timberlake	DJ Cassidy	Legends of the Summer	52,671 / 52,671	$5,715,152	
August 10, 2013	Taylor Swift	Ed Sheeran; Casey James; Austin Mahone	The Red Tour	50,809 / 50,809	$4,149,148	
July 24, 2014	Beyoncé; Jay-Z	—N/a	On the Run Tour	50,035 / 50,035	$5,783,396	
August 29, 2014	One Direction	5 Seconds of Summer	Where We Are Tour	104,617 / 104,617	$9,446,247	During the August 29 show, the band performed a cover of "Happy Birthday" by Mildred J. Hill dedicated to Liam, and "The Way You Make Me Feel" by Michael Jackson.
August 30, 2014	One Direction	5 Seconds of Summer	Where We Are Tour	104,617 / 104,617	$9,446,247	During the August 29 show, the band performed a cover of "Happy Birthday" by Mildred J. Hill dedicated to Liam, and "The Way You Make Me Feel" by Michael Jackson.
August 31, 2014	Luke Bryan	Dierks Bentley; Lee Brice; Cole Swindell; DJ Rock	That's My Kind of Night Tour	50,529 / 50,529	$3,754,362	
June 6, 2015	Kenny Chesney; Miranda Lambert	Brantley Gilbert; Chase Rice; Old Dominion	The Big Revival Tour	43,630 / 48,278	$3,776,207	Chesney was the main headliner, and Lambert joined as the co-headliner only for the Chicago show.
July 3, 2015	Fare Thee Well	—N/a	Fare Thee Well: Celebrating 50 Years of the Grateful Dead	210,283 / 210,283	$30,683,274	50th anniversary concerts
July 4, 2015	Fare Thee Well	—N/a	Fare Thee Well: Celebrating 50 Years of the Grateful Dead	210,283 / 210,283	$30,683,274	50th anniversary concerts
July 5, 2015	Fare Thee Well	—N/a	Fare Thee Well: Celebrating 50 Years of the Grateful Dead	210,283 / 210,283	$30,683,274	50th anniversary concerts
July 18, 2015	Taylor Swift	Vance Joy; Shawn Mendes; HAIM	The 1989 World Tour	110,109 / 110,109	$11,469,887	Andy Grammer and Serayah were special guests.
July 19, 2015	Taylor Swift	Vance Joy; Shawn Mendes; HAIM	The 1989 World Tour	110,109 / 110,109	$11,469,887	Sam Hunt, Andreja Pejić and Lily Donaldson were special guests.
August 23, 2015	One Direction	Icona Pop	On the Road Again Tour	41,527 / 41,527	$3,382,655	
May 27, 2016	Beyoncé	Rae Sremmurd	The Formation World Tour	89,270 / 89,270	$11,279,890	
May 28, 2016	Beyoncé	DJ Scratch	The Formation World Tour	89,270 / 89,270	$11,279,890	
July 1, 2016	Guns N' Roses	Alice in Chains	Not in This Lifetime... Tour	82,172 / 96,088	$8,843,684	
July 3, 2016	Guns N' Roses	Alice in Chains	Not in This Lifetime... Tour	82,172 / 96,088	$8,843,684	
July 23, 2016	Coldplay	Alessia Cara; Foxes	A Head Full of Dreams Tour	95,323 / 95,323	$10,215,572	The July 23 show was cut short due to inclement weather.
July 24, 2016	Coldplay	Alessia Cara; Foxes	A Head Full of Dreams Tour	95,323 / 95,323	$10,215,572	
June 3, 2017	U2	The Lumineers	The Joshua Tree Tour 2017	105,078 / 105,078	$13,435,925	
June 4, 2017	U2	The Lumineers	The Joshua Tree Tour 2017	105,078 / 105,078	$13,435,925	
June 18, 2017	Metallica	Avenged Sevenfold; Local H Mix Master Mike	WorldWired Tour	51,041 / 51,041	$6,093,976	
August 17, 2017	Coldplay	AlunaGeorge; Izzy Bizu	A Head Full of Dreams Tour	52,726 / 52,726	$6,026,402	
June 1, 2018	Taylor Swift	Camila Cabello; Charli XCX	Taylor Swift's Reputation Stadium Tour	105,208 / 105,208	$14,576,697	
June 2, 2018	Taylor Swift	Camila Cabello; Charli XCX	Taylor Swift's Reputation Stadium Tour	105,208 / 105,208	$14,576,697	
July 28, 2018	Kenny Chesney	Thomas Rhett; Old Dominion; Brandon Lay	Trip Around The Sun Tour	52,189 / 52,189	$5,751,195	
August 10, 2018	Beyoncé; Jay-Z	Chloe X Halle and DJ Khaled	On the Run II Tour	86,602 / 86,602	$12,303,099	During the second show, "Summer" was added to the setlist. "Apeshit" was also performed for the first time in its entirety with choreography and background dancers.
August 11, 2018	Beyoncé; Jay-Z	Chloe X Halle and DJ Khaled	On the Run II Tour	86,602 / 86,602	$12,303,099	During the second show, "Summer" was added to the setlist. "Apeshit" was also performed for the first time in its entirety with choreography and background dancers.
October 4, 2018	Ed Sheeran	Snow Patrol; Lauv	÷ Tour	47,263 / 47,263	$4,339,350	
May 11, 2019	BTS	—N/a	Love Yourself World Tour	88,156 / 88,156	$13,345,795	
May 12, 2019	BTS	—N/a	Love Yourself World Tour	88,156 / 88,156	$13,345,795	
June 21, 2019	The Rolling Stones	St. Paul and the Broken Bones	No Filter Tour	98,228 / 98,228	$21,741,564	
June 25, 2019	The Rolling Stones	Whiskey Myers	No Filter Tour	98,228 / 98,228	$21,741,564	
August 26, 2021	Kanye West	—N/a	Kanye West Presents: The Donda Album Experience			Third listening event before the release of his album Donda.
September 4, 2021	Los Bukis	—N/a	Una Historia Cantada	80,335 / 80,335	$9,356,386	
September 5, 2021	Los Bukis	—N/a	Una Historia Cantada	80,335 / 80,335	$9,356,386	
May 28, 2022	Coldplay	H.E.R.Drama	Music of the Spheres World Tour	107,072 / 107,072	$10,969,930	
May 29, 2022	Coldplay	H.E.R.Drama	Music of the Spheres World Tour	107,072 / 107,072	$10,969,930	
June 25, 2022	Kenny Chesney	Florida Georgia Line Old Dominion Michael Franti & Spearhead	Here and Now Tour	52,792 / 52,792	$6,054,015	
July 24, 2022	The Weeknd	Kaytranada; Mike Dean	After Hours til Dawn Stadium Tour	48,887 / 48,887	$7,961,796	
August 5, 2022	Elton John	N/A	Farewell Yellow Brick Road	48,813 / 48,813	$7,118,811	
August 19, 2022	Red Hot Chili Peppers	The Strokes; Thundercat	2022 Global Stadium Tour	47,019 / 47,019	$7,500,942	
August 20, 2022	Bad Bunny	N/A	World's Hottest Tour	50,854 / 50,854	$14,109,590	
September 3, 2022	Rammstein	Duo Abélard	Rammstein Stadium Tour	47,263 / 48,000	$9,051,337	
May 6, 2023	Luke Combs			55,047 / 55,047	$5,713,363	
June 2, 2023	Taylor Swift	Girl in Red; Owenn	The Eras Tour			First female act in history to sell out three shows on a single tour.
June 3, 2023	Taylor Swift	Girl in Red; Owenn	The Eras Tour			First female act in history to sell out three shows on a single tour.
June 4, 2023	Taylor Swift	Muna; Gracie Abrams	The Eras Tour			First female act in history to sell out three shows on a single tour.
July 22, 2023	Beyoncé		Renaissance World Tour	97,686 / 97,686	$30,115,863	
July 23, 2023	Beyoncé		Renaissance World Tour	97,686 / 97,686	$30,115,863	
July 29, 2023	Ed Sheeran	Khalid; Cat Burns	+-=÷× Tour	73,015 / 73,015	$8,054,888	
September 15, 2023	Karol G	Agudelo; Young Miko	Mañana Será Bonito Tour	52,505 / 52,505	$10,028,807	
June 15, 2024	Kenny Chesney; Zac Brown Band	Megan Moroney; Uncle Kracker	Sun Goes Down 2024 Tour			
June 21, 2024	Billy Joel; Stevie Nicks		Billy Joel in Concert			
June 27, 2024	The Rolling Stones	Bettye LaVette	Hackney Diamonds Tour			
June 30, 2024	The Rolling Stones	Lainey Wilson	Hackney Diamonds Tour			
July 20, 2024	George Strait	Little Big Town Chris Stapleton				
August 9, 2024	Metallica	Pantera; Mammoth WVH	M72 World Tour	134,400 / 134,400	$16,328,255	
August 11, 2024	Metallica	Five Finger Death Punch; Ice Nine Kills	M72 World Tour	134,400 / 134,400	$16,328,255	
August 24, 2024	Pink	Sheryl Crow; KidCutUp; The Script	P!NK: Summer Carnival			
May 15, 2025	Beyoncé		Cowboy Carter Tour	143,256 / 143,256	$42,523,825	Highest gross at the stadium ever.
May 17, 2025	Beyoncé		Cowboy Carter Tour	143,256 / 143,256	$42,523,825	Highest gross at the stadium ever.
May 18, 2025	Beyoncé		Cowboy Carter Tour	143,256 / 143,256	$42,523,825	Highest gross at the stadium ever.
May 24, 2025	AC/DC	The Pretty Reckless	Power Up Tour			
May 30, 2025	The Weeknd	Playboi Carti; Mike Dean	After Hours til Dawn Tour	96,042 / 96,042	$16,694,072	
May 31, 2025	The Weeknd	Playboi Carti; Mike Dean	After Hours til Dawn Tour	96,042 / 96,042	$16,694,072	
June 6, 2025	Kendrick Lamar; SZA	Mustard	Grand National Tour	49,943 / 49,943	$13,214,060	
July 18, 2025	Blackpink		Deadline World Tour			The first K-Pop girl group to hold a concert at this venue.
August 28, 2025	Oasis	Cage the Elephant	Oasis Live '25 Tour			
August 29, 2025	My Chemical Romance	Devo	Long Live The Black Parade			
August 30, 2025	The Lumineers	St. Vincent Lake Street Dive	Automatic World Tour			
August 31, 2025	System of a Down	Avenged Sevenfold Polyphia Wisp				
September 1, 2025	System of a Down	Avenged Sevenfold Polyphia Wisp				
May 16, 2026	Bruno Mars	DJ Pee .Wee; Leon Thomas	The Romantic Tour			
May 17, 2026	Bruno Mars	DJ Pee .Wee; Leon Thomas	The Romantic Tour			
June 19, 2026	Morgan Wallen	Brooks & Dunn; Gavin Adcock; Zach John King	Still The Problem Tour			
June 20, 2026	Morgan Wallen	Ella Langley; Gavin Adcock; Zach John King	Still The Problem Tour			
June 27, 2026	Ed Sheeran	Myles Smith; Ellie Banke	Loop Tour			
July 24, 2026	Karol G		Viajando Por El Mundo Tropitour			
July 25, 2026	Karol G		Viajando Por El Mundo Tropitour			
August 8, 2026	Foo Fighters	Queens Of The Stone Age; Mannequin Pussy	Take Cover Tour			
August 21, 2026	Usher; Chris Brown		The R&B Tour			
August 22, 2026	Usher; Chris Brown		The R&B Tour			
August 27, 2026	BTS		Arirang World Tour			
August 28, 2026	BTS		Arirang World Tour			
September 3, 2026	Kanye West		Ye Live Concert Tour			
September 4, 2026	Kanye West		Ye Live Concert Tour			
May 8, 2027	Zach Bryan	John Fogerty; Fey Fili	Young Manhood and Other Donatable Organs Tour			
June 18, 2027	Stray Kids		Run It World Tour			
July 25, 2027	Slipknot	Bring Me The Horizon; Lamb of God	(sic)est Stadium Tour			

=== Other events ===
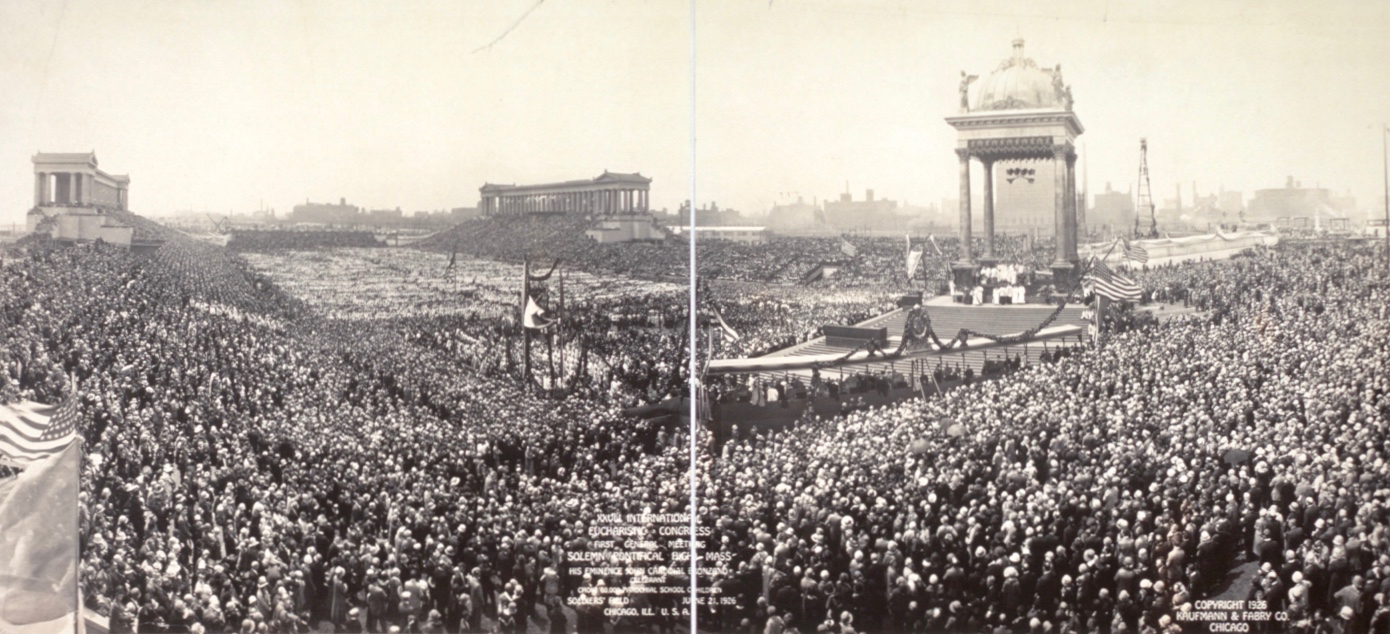
Eucharistic Congress in 1926

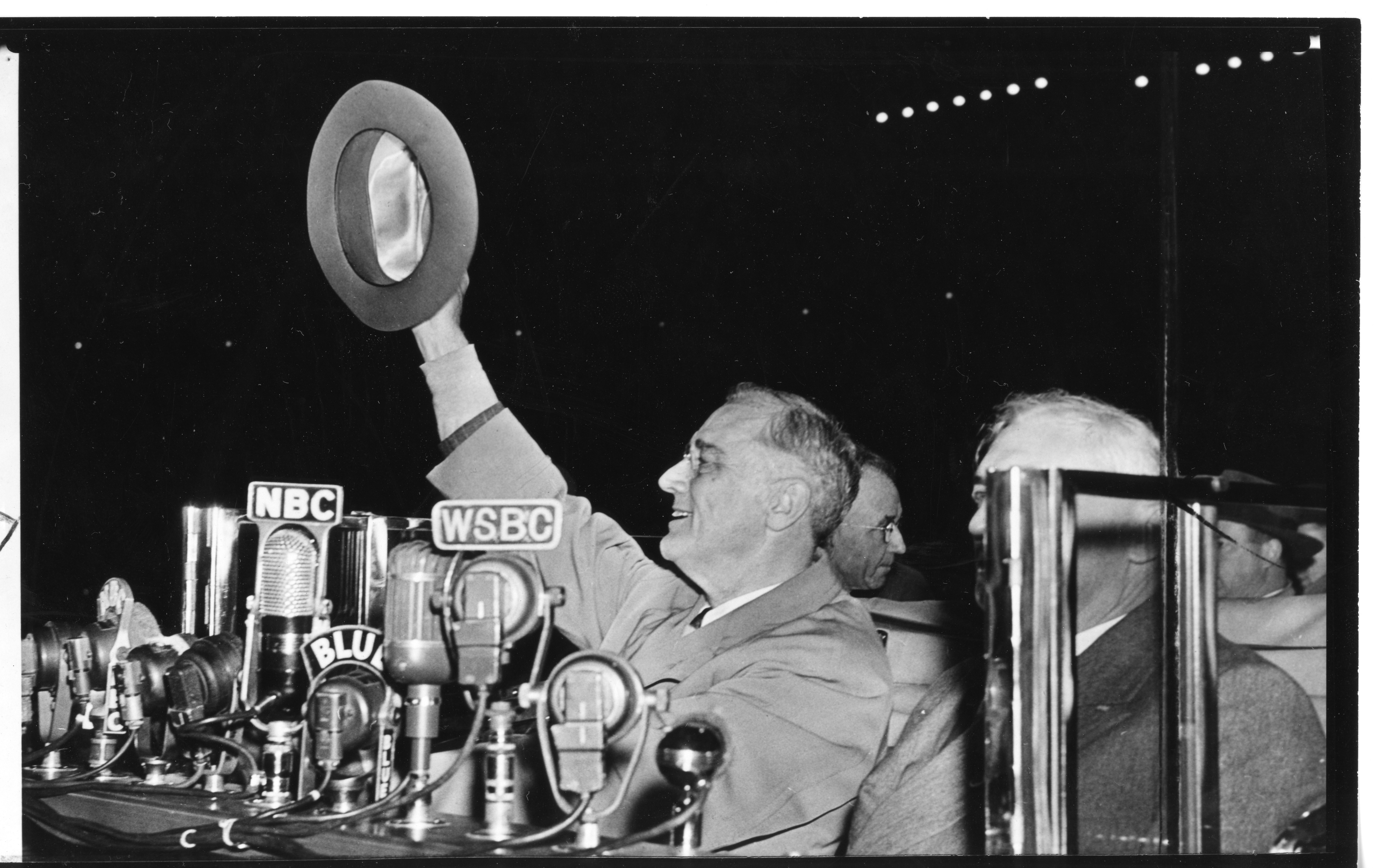
President Franklin D. Roosevelt at Soldier Field, 1944

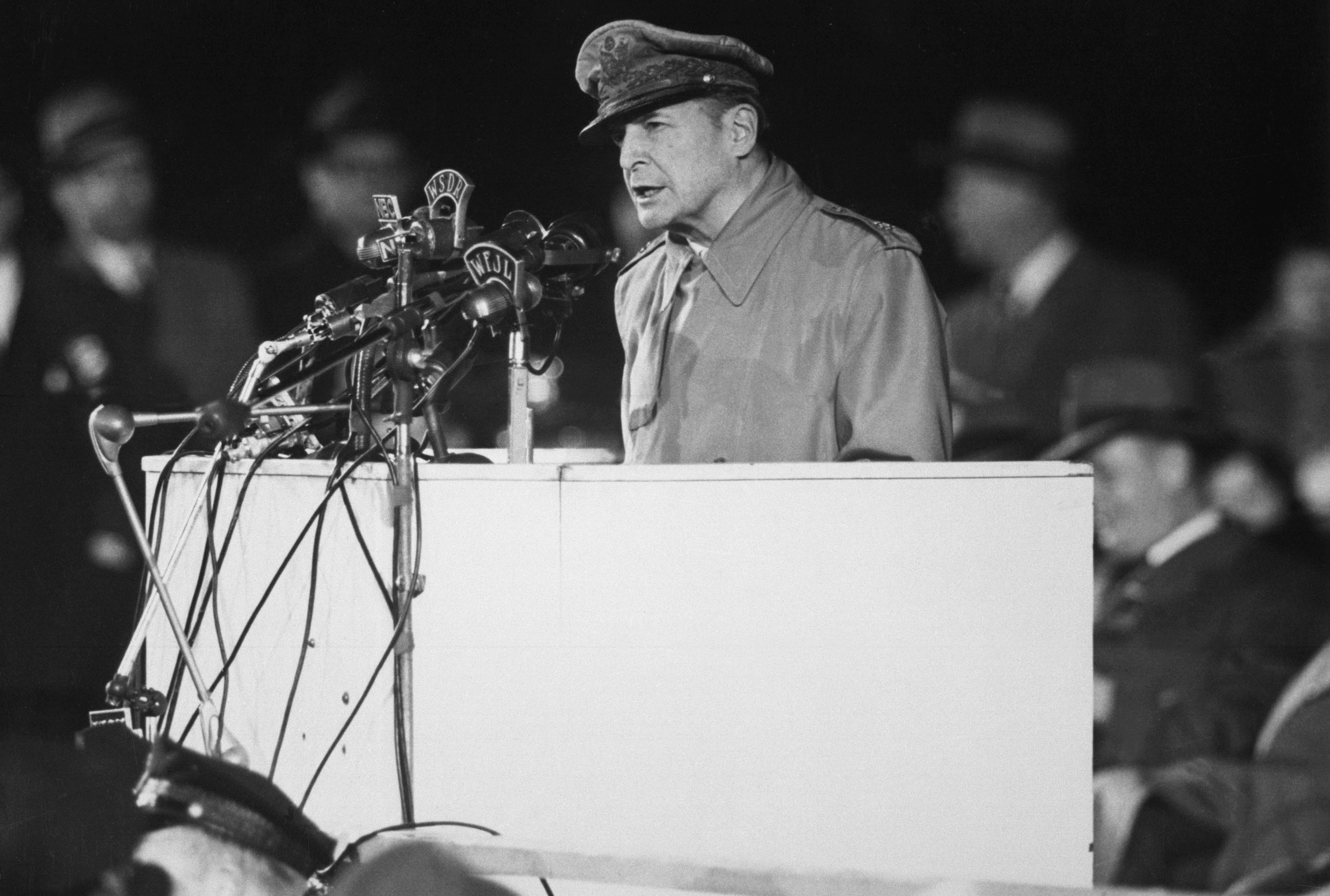
Gen. Douglas MacArthur at Soldier Field, 1951

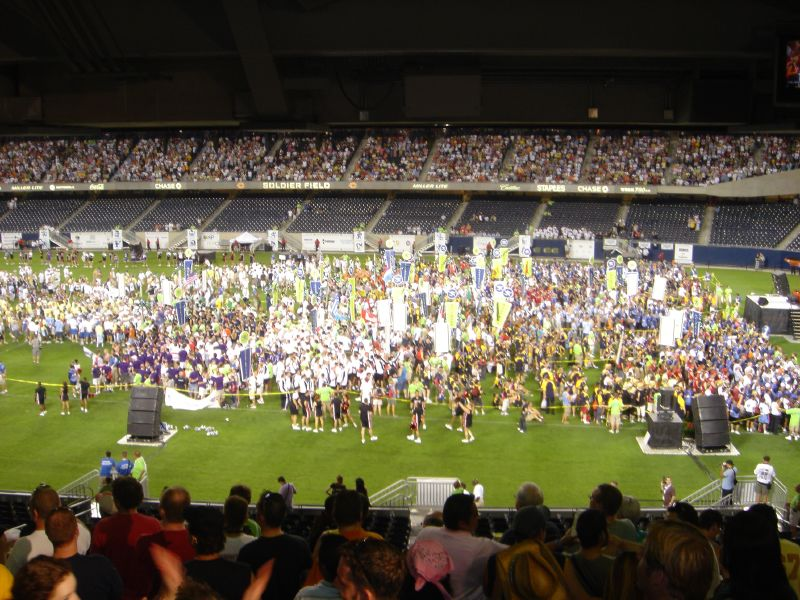
Opening ceremonies of the 2006 Gay Games at Soldier Field

- June 21–23, 1926: the 28th International Eucharistic Congress held three days of outdoor day and evening events.
- September 22, 1927: The Long Count Fight, the second heavyweight championship bout between Jack Dempsey and Gene Tunney, was held at Soldier Field.
- June 24, 1932: a war show celebrating the bicentennial of George Washington's birth featured Amelia Earhart.
- May 27, 1933: Soldier Field held the opening ceremonies of the Century of Progress World's Fair. Postmaster General and DNC-Chairman James Farley facilitated the opening ceremony.
- August 23, 1938: a free-to-the-public jitterbug event was scheduled. When attendance far outstripped expectations (estimates range from 120,000 to 215,000), people flooded the field where the bands were expected to play, and enough people were outside the stadium that those insides could not exit. After a couple hour delay, the bands were able to start playing, only to have the electrical supply for their sound system disrupted by the mass of dancers.
- October 28, 1944: U.S. President Franklin D. Roosevelt made an appearance at Soldier Field, which was the only Midwestern speaking appearance he made in his last re-election campaign. This appearance was attended by over 150,000 (with at least as many people attempting to attend who were unable to gain admission).
- April 25, 1951: Douglas MacArthur, US General during World War II, addressed a crowd of 50,000 at Soldier Field in his first visit to the United States in 14 years.
- June 21, 1964: the Chicago Freedom Movement, led by Martin Luther King Jr., held a rally here. As many as 75,000 came to hear Reverend King, Reverend Theodore Hesburgh (president of the University of Notre Dame, Archbishop Arthur M. Brazier, and Minister Edgar Chandler, among others.
- July 10, 1966: the Chicago Freedom Movement held a second rally here. As many as 60,000 people came to hear Dr. King, as well as Mahalia Jackson, Stevie Wonder and Peter, Paul and Mary.
- 1974: The Chicago Fire of the World Football League (WFL) played here before folding in 1975.
- October 13, 1983: David D. Meilahn made the first-ever commercial cell phone call on a Motorola DynaTAC from his Mercedes-Benz 380SL at Soldier Field. This is considered a major turning point in communications. The call was to Bob Barnett, then president of Ameritech Mobile Communications, who in turn placed a call on a DynaTAC from a Chrysler convertible to the grandson of Alexander Graham Bell, who was in Germany.
- The stadium was listed on the National Register of Historic Places beginning in 1984. Its National Historic Landmark status was removed in 2006.
- In the summer of 2006, the stadium hosted the opening ceremony of the Gay Games.
- In 2012, United States President Barack Obama held the 2012 Chicago summit, a summit of the North Atlantic Treaty Organization (NATO), at McCormick Place and Soldier Field.
- When the field and nearby Shedd Aquarium had to close to visitors due to the COVID-19 pandemic, Soldier Field became the exercise grounds for the aquarium's penguins.

== In popular culture ==
- In the Marvel Comics event Siege, Soldier Field is inadvertently destroyed mid-game by Thor's friend Volstagg when he is tricked into fighting the U-Foes through Loki and Norman Osborn's manipulations of events. The stadium is later seen being rebuilt by the heroes after Steve Rogers is appointed head of U.S. Security, following the aforementioned event.
- The 1977 documentary film Powers of Ten focuses on two people having a picnic on the east side of Soldier Field.
- The stadium appears in the 2006 Clint Eastwood–directed film Flags of Our Fathers, when the survivors of the Iwo Jima flag-raising reenact it for a patriotic rally.
- The opening match of the 1994 FIFA World Cup at Soldier Field is one of the five events covered in the 2010 ESPN 30 for 30 documentary June 17th, 1994.
- A future version of Soldier Field from August 4017 is featured in David Weber's short story "From the Highlands" (featured in the anthology collection Changer of Worlds). The stadium appears to have gone through multiple renovations, rebuilds and even having been built over, until nothing but the open space of the original remains.
- In the 2016 Chicago Fire episode "The Sky Is Falling", Soldier Field is featured on one of their calls for a terrorist hoax. The stadium appears again in the 2017 episode "Sixty Days", as one of their calls for a high angle rescue. The stadium is featured again in the eighth season as members of firehouse 51 respond to help victims of a deadly infection. It is also featured and referenced in the 2021 episode "A White-Knuckle Panic" as the location for a medal ceremony for firefighter Randy McHolland (Mouch).
- In both the book and TV series Daisy Jones & the Six, the eponymous band plays their final concert at Soldier Field on July 11, 1977.
- In the book Steelheart (The Reckoners, Book 1) by Brandon Sanderson, the final battle against the titular Steelheart takes place in an apocalyptic, steel version of Soldier Field.

== Gallery ==
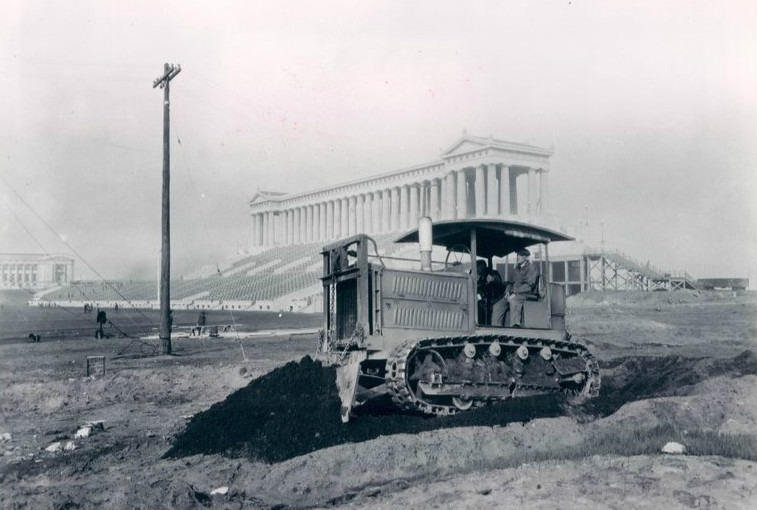
Soldier Field nearing completion, 1924

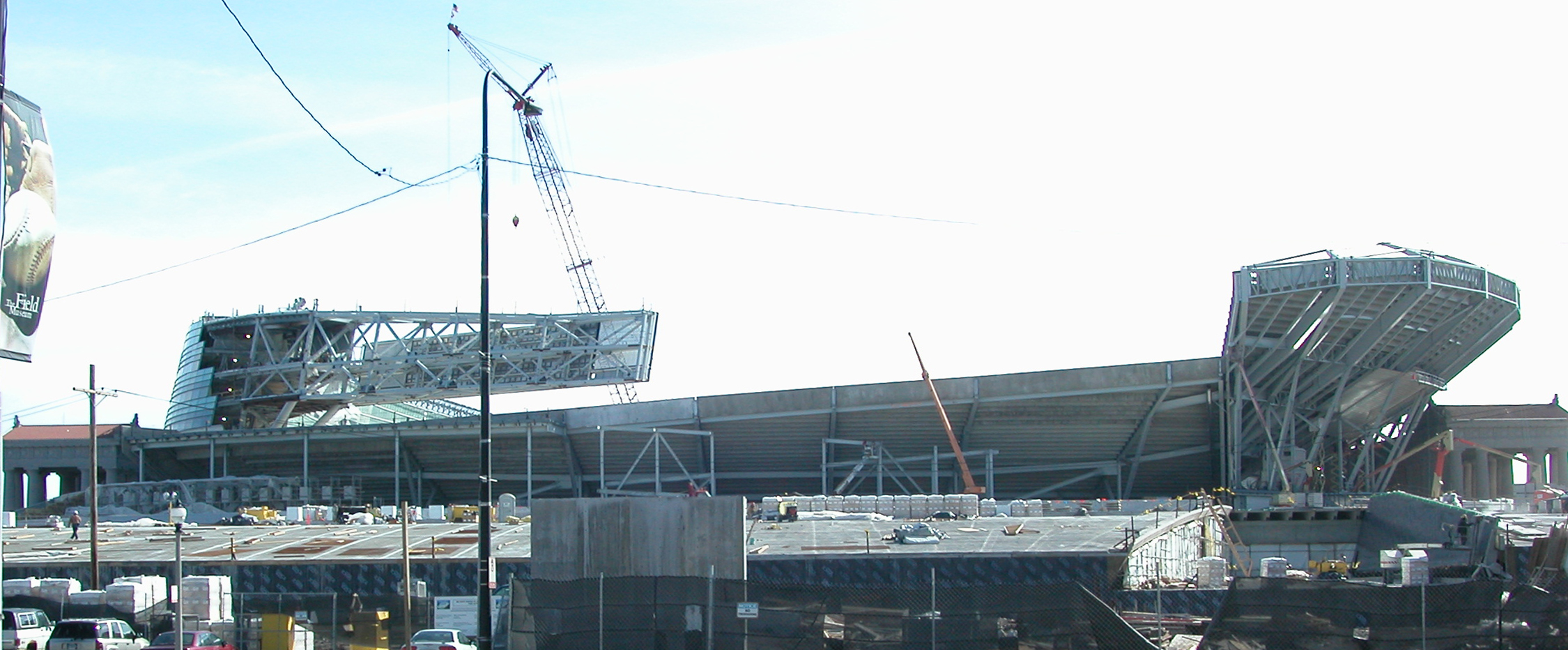
The stadium mid-renovation in March 2003

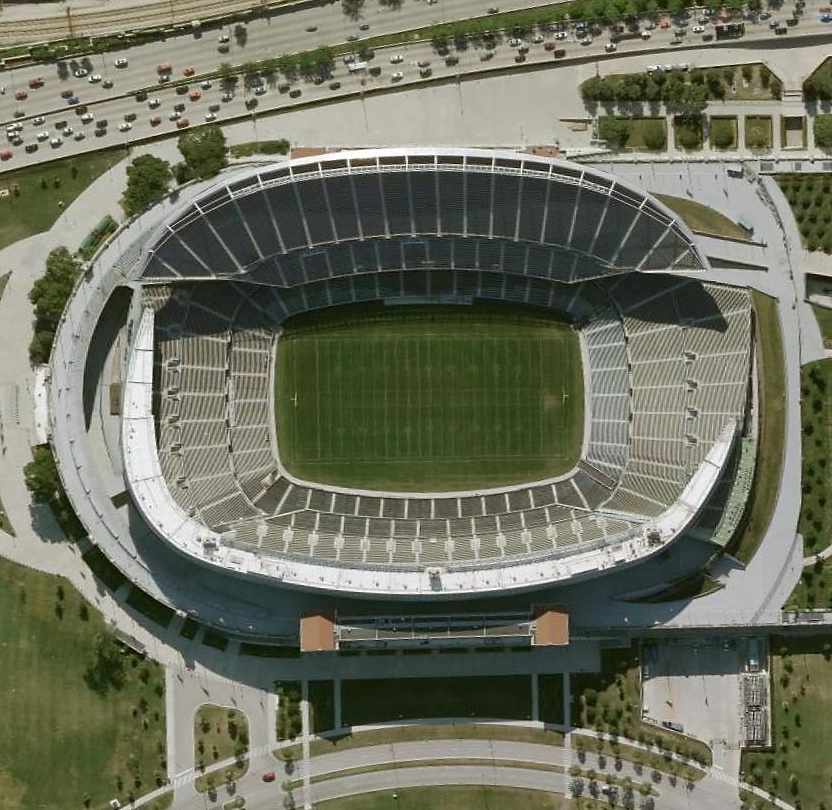
Aerial view of the stadium in 2008

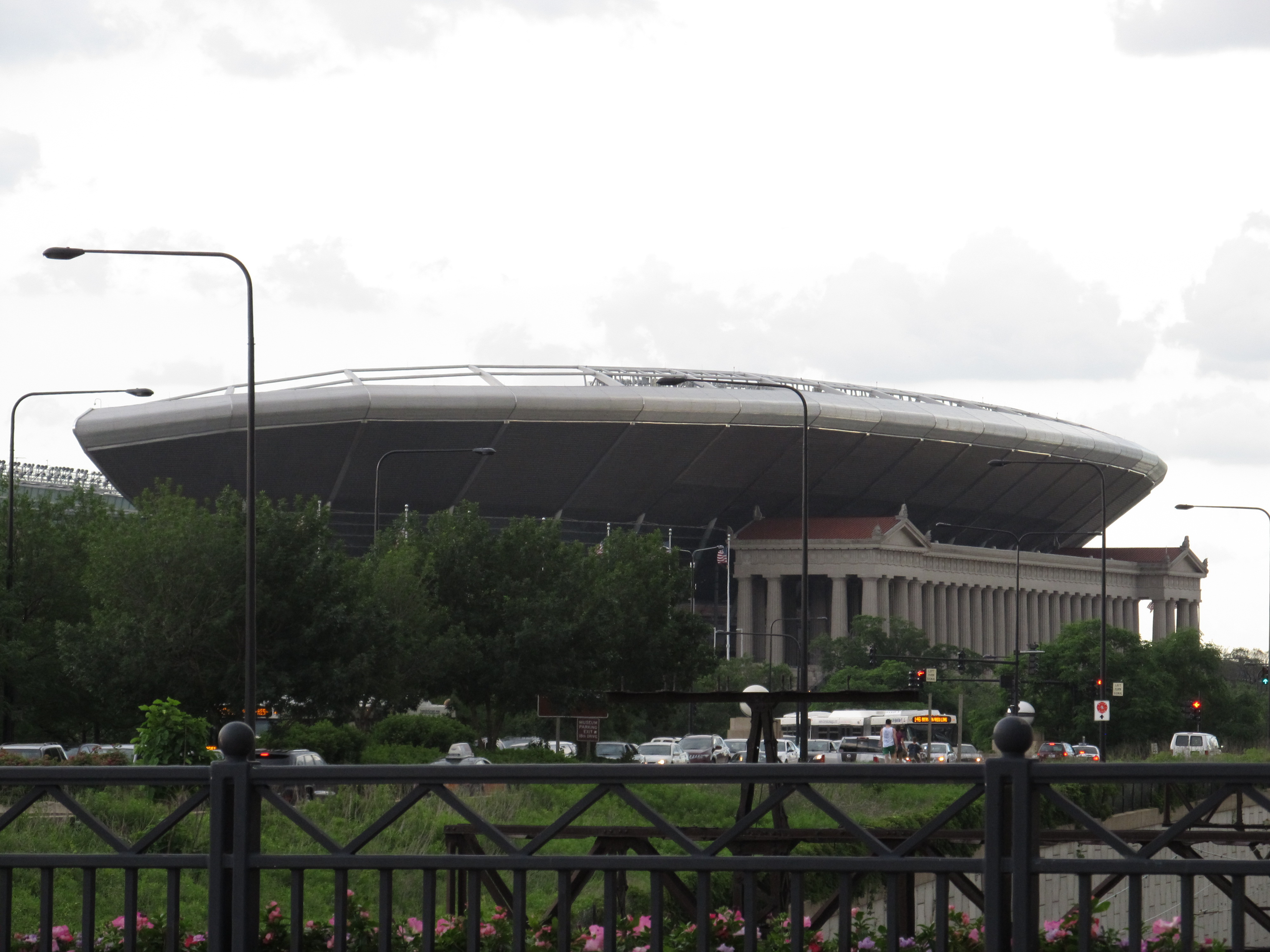
Soldier Field as seen from Lake Shore Drive in 2013

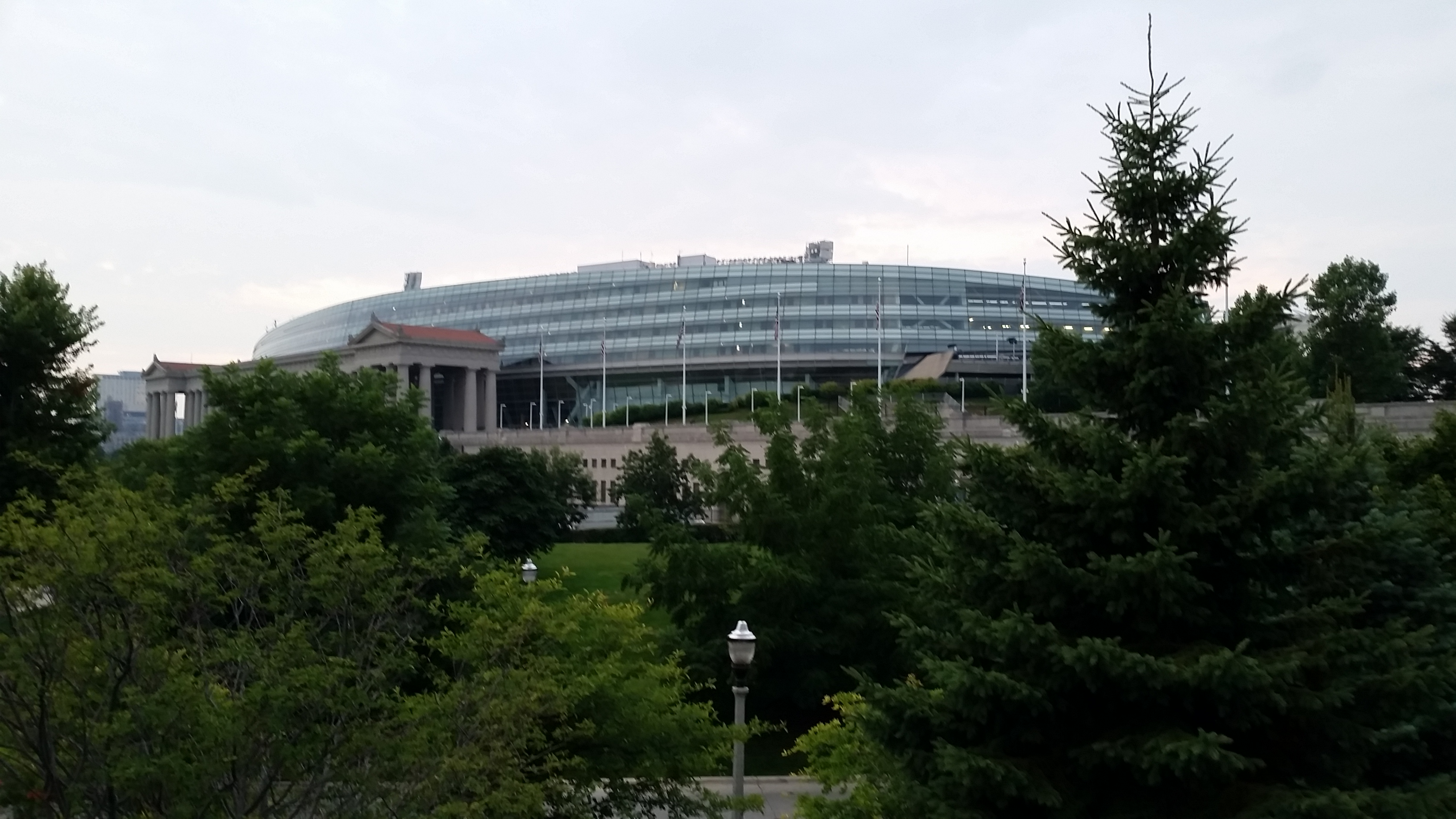
The scenery around Soldier Field, 2014

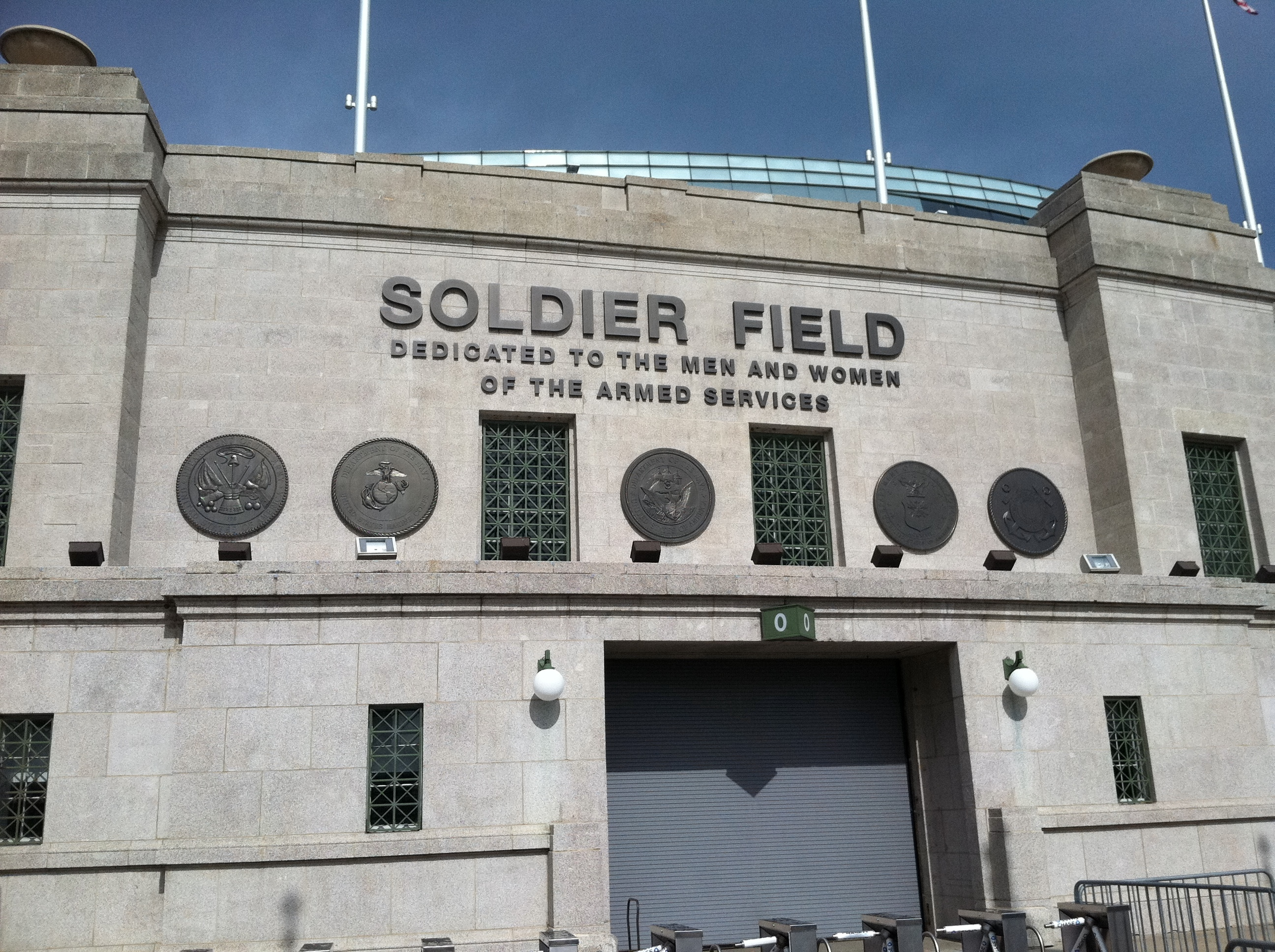
Exterior of Soldier Field, with a sign reading "Dedicated to the men and women of the armed services"

Front of bronze mural

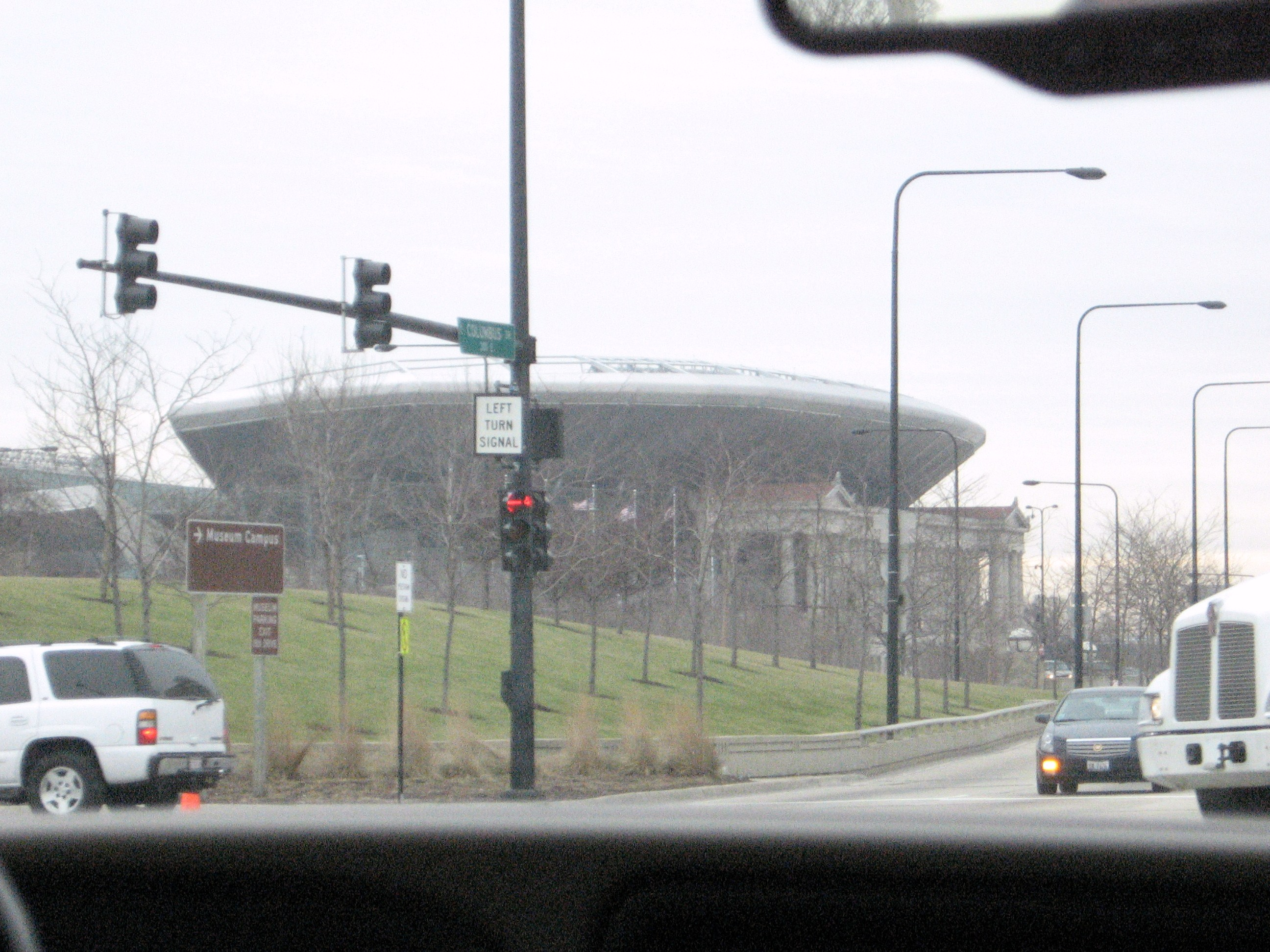
View towards the western grandstand's cantilever over the original western colonnade

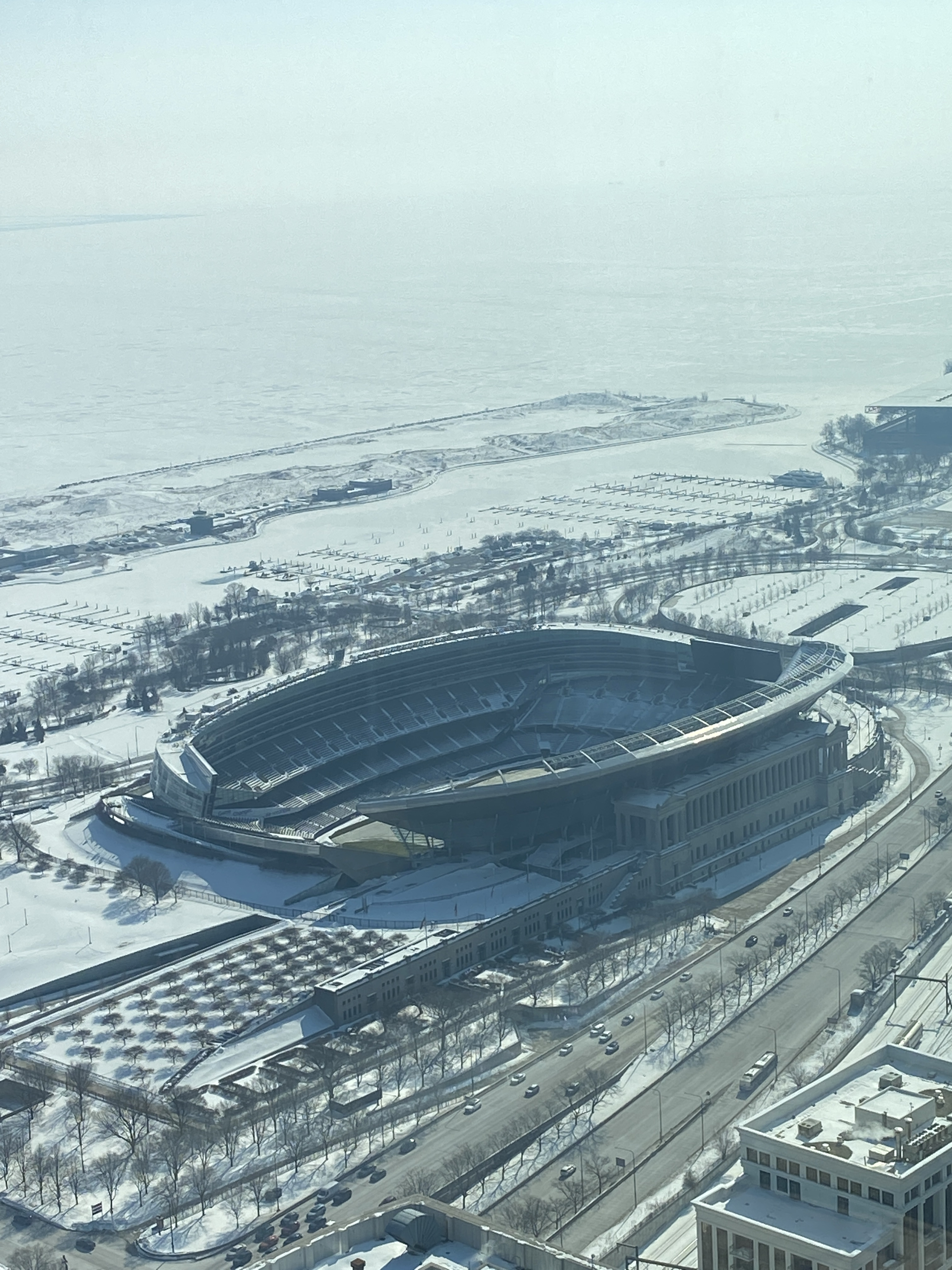
View from NEMA, 2021

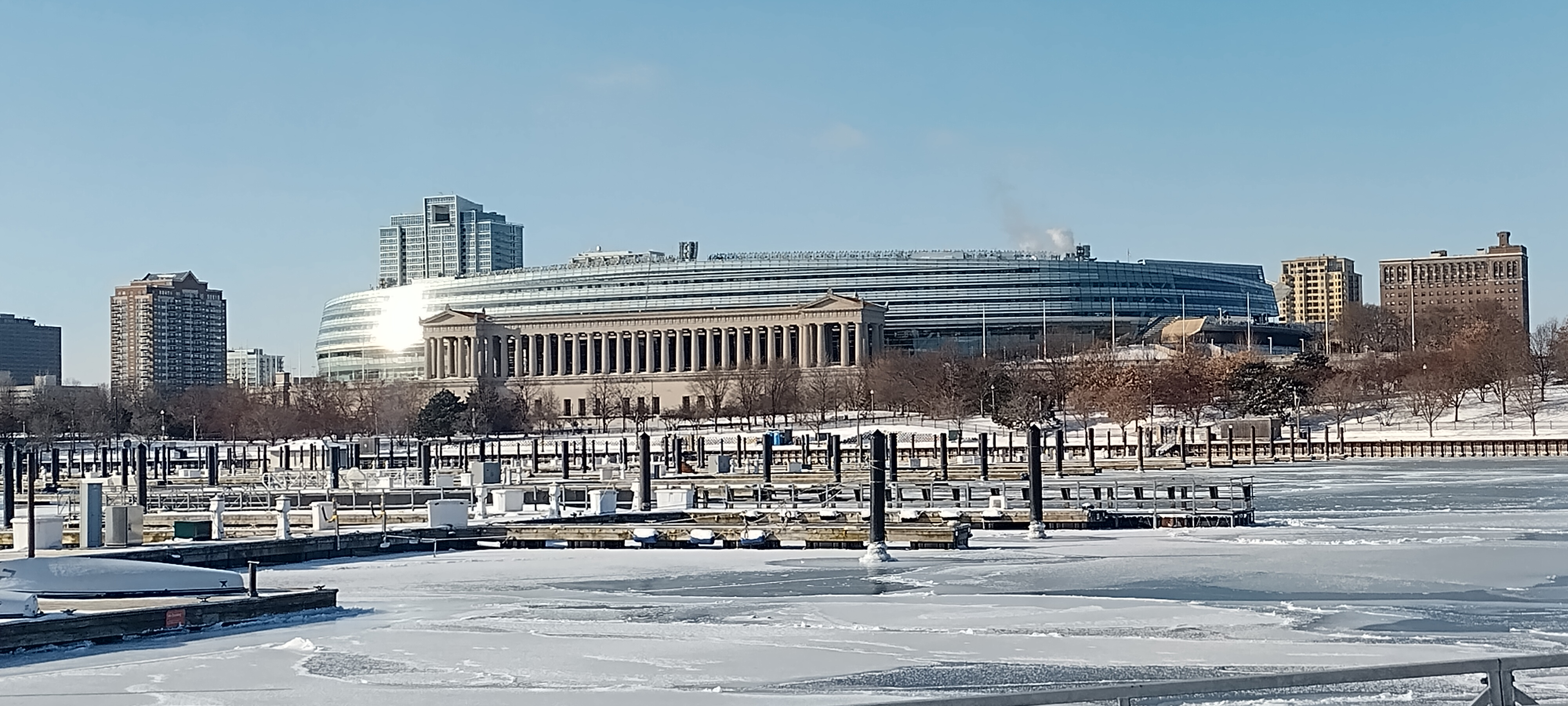
From Northerly Island in the winter, 2022

== See also ==
- List of events at Soldier Field
- Lists of stadiums

== Notes ==
Events and tenants
Preceded by San Siro; Milan	FIFA World Cup; Opening Venue; 1994	Succeeded by: Stade de France; Paris (Saint-Denis)
Preceded by Wrigley Field; Memorial Stadium	Home of the Chicago Bears; 1971–2001; 2003–present	Succeeded by Memorial Stadium current stadium
Preceded by Comiskey Park	Home of the Chicago Cardinals; 1959	Succeeded by Busch Stadium
Preceded by first stadium Cardinal Stadium; SeatGeek Stadium	Home of Chicago Fire FC; 1998–2001; 2003–2005; 2020–present	Succeeded by Cardinal Stadium; SeatGeek Stadium current stadium
Preceded by Giants Stadium; East Rutherford	CONCACAF Gold Cup; Final Venue; 2007	Succeeded by Giants Stadium; East Rutherford
Preceded by Rose Bowl; Pasadena	CONCACAF Gold Cup; Final Venue; 2013	Succeeded by Lincoln Financial Field; Philadelphia
Preceded by Candlestick Park; RFK Stadium; Qwest Field; Louisiana Superdome	Host of NFC Championship Game; 1986; 1989; 2007; 2011	Succeeded by Giants Stadium; Candlestick Park; Lambeau Field; Candlestick Park
