= The Illusion (album) =

Studio album by the Illusion
- Released: 1969
- Genre: Psychedelic rock, acid rock, hard rock
- Length: 36:31
- Label: Steed
- Producer: Jeff Barry

The Illusion chronology
The Illusion (1969)	Together (as a way of life) (1969)

The Illusion is a 1969 album by the Illusion. It was released on the Steed Records label and reached No. 69 in the Billboard albums chart and stayed on the chart for 27 weeks. An edited version of the album's first track, "Did You See Her Eyes", reached No. 32 on the Billboard singles chart.

== Track listing ==
Side One
No.	Title	Writer(s)	Length
1.	"Did You See Her Eyes"	Jeff Barry	6:55
2.	"Talkin' Sweet Talkin' Soul"	Mike Maniscalco, John Vinci, Richie Cerniglia, Chuck Alder	2:42
3.	"Just Imagine"	Maniscalco, Cerniglia	3:30
4.	"Medley: "Run, Run, Run" / "Willy Gee (Miss Holy Lady)""	Maniscalco	5:55

Side Two
No.	Title	Writer(s)	Length
5.	"I Love You, Yes I Do"	Barry, Cerniglia	2:20
6.	"Alone"	Maniscalco, Cerniglia	3:00
7.	"Charlena"	M. Chavez, H. Chaney	2:17
8.	"Medley: "Why, Tell Me Why" / "The Real Thing"" ("Why, Tell Me Why" composed by Alder, "The Real Thing" composed by Alder/Cerniglia)	[see note]	6:24
9.	"You Made Me What I Am"	Maniscalco, Vinci, Cerniglia	3:28

== Personnel ==
- John Vinci - vocals (1, 2, 4, 6–9)
- Richie Cerniglia - lead guitar, vocals
- Mike Maniscalco - rhythm guitar, vocals (3, 5)
- Chuck Alder - bass
- Mike Ricciardella - drums

Audio engineer: Fred Weinberg Source: Album sleeve credits Album cover photograph by Joel Brodsky
