= The Illusion (band) =

American hard rock band

The Illusion were an American psychedelic hard rock band from Long Island, New York. They released three albums in the United States, the first of which was also issued in the United Kingdom. All three albums were produced by Jeff Barry. They are best known for their single "Did You See Her Eyes", which reached #32 in the US in mid-1969.

== History ==
After working in earlier Long Island (New York) bands like the Dell Sonics and The Creations, vocalist John Vinci, lead guitarist Richie Cerniglia, bassist Chuck Alder, multi-instrumentalist Mike Maniscalco and drummer Mike Ricciardella came together as The '5' Illusions. They soon dropped the '5' and became popular enough to release their first single, "My Party" for DynoVoice Records, composed and produced by label mate Mitch Ryder.

With their reputation growing beyond the local scene, they were offered a contract by hit songwriter and producer Jeff Barry, who had started his own label, Steed Records. The group had one major hit in the United States, 1969's "Did You See Her Eyes", which peaked at number 32 on the Billboard chart. and at number 1 in some places in New York, as well as three minor hits: "Together" (peaked at No. 80 on Billboard), "Let's Make Each Other Happy" (No. 98), and "How Does it Feel?" (No. 110). Their first album reached No. 69 and stayed 27 weeks in the Billboard 200 albums chart.

During their existence the band toured extensively throughout the United States, opening for various acts including The Who, The Allman Brothers Band, The Jimi Hendrix Experience, Chicago and Sly and the Family Stone. After their third album If It's So, drummer Mike Ricciardella left the group after a disagreement over the band's future musical direction. All the group's Steed Records albums were re-released on CD in 1994 on Germany's TRC Records. Their first and second albums, The Illusion and Together (As a Way of Life) were released on CD in 2008, with the band stating "we're working on If It's So".

== Discography ==
=== Albums ===
- The Illusion (Steed Records, 1969) U.S. No. 69 (TRC 094 CD, 1994, Germany)
- Together (As a Way of Life) (Steed, 1969) (Dot, 1970, Canada) (TRC 037 CD, 1994, Germany)
- If It's So (Steed, 1970) (Paramount, 1970, France) (TRC 018 CD, Germany, 1994)
- The Lost Live Tapes (ChuckAlder.com, 2010)

=== Singles ===
- My Party" / "It's A Groovy Time" - DynoVoice DV-914 (4/1968 US)
- "Did You See Her Eyes" / "Falling In Love" - Steed 45-712 (1/1969 US)
- "Run, Run, Run" / "I Love You, Yes I Do (Promo Only)" - Steed 45-717 (1969 US)
- "Did You See Her Eyes" / "Falling In Love" (#32) - Steed 45-718 (6/1969 US,) DOT STEED-718X (1969 Canada,) DOT-122 (3/28/1969 UK)
- "Did You See Her Eyes" / "Charlena" - DOT 2C-006-10375 (1969 France)
- "How Does It Feel" / "Once In A Lifetime" (#110) - Steed 45-721 (9/69)
- "Together" / "Don't Push It" (#80) - Steed 45-722 (12/1969 US)
- "Together" / "Don't Push It" - DOT 1C-006-90-963 (1969 Germany), DOT 2C-006-90.963-M (1969 France), DOT 133 (Promo only 1970 UK)
- "Juntos (Together)" / "Dáme Tu Amor, Nina (Love Me Girl)" - Hispa Vox H-552 (1969 Spain)
- "Let's Make Each Other Happy" / "Beside You" (#98) - Steed 45-726 (1970 US)
- "Let's Make Each Other Happy" / "Beside You" (B-Side-U) DOT 137 (5/1970-withdrawn UK), Paramount PARA-3007 (7/1970 UK)
- "Wait A Minute" / "Collection" (Promo Only) - Steed 45-732 (4/1971 US)
- "Did You See Her Eyes" (The Illusion Side One only) / "San Francisco Girls (Return Of The Native)" by Fever Tree - Collectables Records COLL-3730 (1991 US)

== Members ==
- John Vinci - vocals
- Richie Cerniglia - lead guitar, vocals
- Mike Maniscalco - guitar, keyboards, vocals, saxophone
- Chuck Alder - bass, vocals
- Mike Ricciardella - drums, percussion, vocals

== Post-Illusion ==
After The Illusion, Mike Ricciardella joined Barnaby Bye with Peppy Castro (ex-Blues Magoos) and The Alessi Brothers (Billy & Bob), recording two albums for Atlantic Records, Room To Grow in 1973 and Touch in 1974. In 1976, Ricciardella and Castro (as Emil Theilheim, his real name), with Dennis Santiago and ex-Illusion mates Mike Maniscalco and Rich Cerniglia formed Wiggy Bits, recording one self-titled album for Polydor Records. After their demise, Ricciardella, Maniscalco (as Mike Coxton) and Cerniglia (as Richie C.) formed Network, with Howie Blume, George Bitzer and Illusion vocalist John Vinci. The name changes were requested by the record label since it thought their names sounded too Italian. After recording their self-titled first album in 1977, Vinci was replaced by B.G. Gibson in 1978 before recording their second (and last) album for Epic Records, Nightwork.

In 1986, Cerniglia and Ricciardella (under their real names again) joined Ernie White and Steve Vitale as Aviator, releasing one self-titled album on RCA Records, later reissued on CD by Escape. In 2010, Barnabye Bye re-formed, recording and self-releasing a third album Thrice Upon A Time, thirty-six years after their last, while ex-Illusion bassist Chuck Alder released a CD compilation, The Lost Live Tapes, of unreleased studio and live Illusion recordings.
