= The Archies discography =

- Studio albums: 6
- Compilation albums: 10
- Singles: 11
- Box sets: 1

This is the discography of American bubblegum pop band the Archies.

== Albums ==
=== Studio albums ===
Title	Album details	Peak chart positions		
Title	Album details	US	CAN	GER
The Archies	Released: September 1968; Label: Calendar; Formats: LP, 8-track	88	42	—
Everything's Archie	Released: May 1969; Label: Calendar; Formats: LP, 8-track; Released in some countries as Sugar Sugar	66	59	25
Jingle Jangle	Released: December 1969; Label: Kirshner; Formats: LP, MC, 8-track	125	78	—
Sunshine	Released: August 1970; Label: Kirshner; Formats: LP, MC, 8-track	137	—	—
This Is Love	Released: March 1971; Label: Kirshner; Formats: LP, MC, 8-track	—	—	—
The Archies Christmas Album	Released: September 30, 2008; Label: Fuel 2000; Formats: CD, digital download	—	—	—
"—" denotes releases that did not chart or were not released in that territory.

=== Compilation albums ===
Title	Album details	Peak chart positions
Title	Album details	US
The Archies Greatest Hits	Released: November 1970; Label: Kirshner; Formats: LP, MC, 8-track	114
The Archies	Released: 1977; Label: RCA/Laurie House; Formats: LP, 8-track	—
The Archies	Released: 1979; Label: CBS; Formats: LP, 8-track	—
Straight A's	Released: September 1981; Label: Accord; Formats: LP	
So Good	Released: 1982; Label: Brylen; Formats: LP, MC	—
The Very Best Of	Released: 1992; Label: The Collection; Formats: CD	—
Greatest Hits	Released: 1997; Label: Pegasus; Formats: CD	—
The Very Best Of The Archies	Released: July 6, 1999; Label: Cult; Formats: CD	—
Absolutely The Best Of The Archies	Released: May 22, 2001; Label: Fuel 2000; Formats: CD	—
The Definitive Archies – Greatest Hits & More	Released: September 19, 2019; Label: Real Gone Music; Formats: LP	—
"—" denotes releases that did not chart or were not released in that territory.

=== Box sets ===
Title	Album details
Sugar Sugar – The Complete Albums Collection	Released: July 29, 2016; Label: Goldenlane; Formats: 5xCD, digital download

== Singles ==
Year	Titles (A-side, B-side) Both sides from same album except where indicated	Peak chart positions										Certifications	Album
Year	Titles (A-side, B-side) Both sides from same album except where indicated	US	US AC	AUS	CAN	DEN	GER	NZ	SA	SPA	UK	Certifications	Album
1968	"Bang-Shang-A-Lang" b/w "Truck Driver"	22	—	16	11	—	—	—	3	—	—		The Archies
1968	"Feelin' So Good (S.K.O.O.B.Y.-D.O.O.)" b/w "Love Light"	53	—	35	32	—	—	—	6	—	—		Everything's Archie
1969	"Sugar, Sugar" b/w "Melody Hill"	1	22	6	1	1	1	—	1	1	1	RIAA: Gold; BPI: Platinum; RMNZ: Platinum	Everything's Archie
1969	"Jingle Jangle" b/w "Justine"	10	37	15	1	—	7	10	15	7	—	RIAA: Gold	Jingle Jangle
1970	"Who's Your Baby?" b/w "Senorita Rita" (from Jingle Jangle)	40	—	24	32	—	21	—	—	—	—		The Archies Greatest Hits
1970	"Sunshine" b/w "Over and Over"	57	—	50	43	—	26	—	16	19	—		Sunshine
1970	"Together We Two" b/w "Everything's Alright" (from Jingle Jangle)	122	—	—	86	—	—	—	—	—	—		This Is Love
1971	"A Summer Prayer for Peace" b/w "Maybe I'm Wrong" (from This Is Love)	—	—	—	87	2	—	—	1	—	—		Sunshine
1971	"This Is Love" b/w "Throw a Little Love My Way"	—	—	—	—	—	—	—	—	—	—		This Is Love
1972	"Love Is Living in You" b/w "Hold On to Lovin'" (from This Is Love)	—	—	—	—	—	—	—	—	—	—		Non-album singles
1972	"Strangers in the Morning" b/w "Plum Crazy"	—	—	—	—	—	—	—	—	—	—		Non-album singles
"—" denotes releases that did not chart or were not released in that territory.
