= List of songs written by Jeff Barry and Ellie Greenwich =

This is a list of songs written by Jeff Barry and Ellie Greenwich, either together as a songwriting partnership, with other writers, or individually.

== Chart hits and other notable songs written by Jeff Barry and Ellie Greenwich ==
Year	Song	Original artist	^{U.S. Pop}	^{U.S. R&B}	^{UK Singles Chart}	Other charting versions, and notes
1963	"When the Boy's Happy (the Girl's Happy Too)"	The Four Pennies	95	-	-	
1963	"Da Doo Ron Ron"	The Crystals	3	5	5	Written by Jeff Barry, Ellie Greenwich, and Phil Spector; 1972: Ian Matthews, #96 US; 1974: The Crystals, #15 UK (reissue); 1977: Shaun Cassidy, #1 US
1963	"What a Guy"	The Raindrops	41	25	-	
1963	"Give Us Your Blessing"	Ray Peterson	70	-	-	1965: The Shangri-Las, "Give Us Your Blessings", #29 US
1963	"Not Too Young to Get Married"	Bob B. Soxx & the Blue Jeans	63	-	-	Written by Jeff Barry, Ellie Greenwich, and Phil Spector
1963	"Wait ‘Til My Bobby Gets Home"	Darlene Love	26	-	-	Written by Jeff Barry, Ellie Greenwich, and Phil Spector
1963	"The Kind of Boy You Can't Forget"	The Raindrops	95	-	-	
1963	"Then He Kissed Me"	The Crystals	6	8	2	Written by Jeff Barry, Ellie Greenwich, and Phil Spector; 1967: The Beach Boys, "Then I Kissed Her", #4 UK; 1977: Kiss, "Then She Kissed Me", #51 UK; 1981: Gary Glitter, "And Then She Kissed Me", #39 UK
1963	"Be My Baby"	The Ronettes	2	4	4	Written by Jeff Barry, Ellie Greenwich, and Phil Spector; 1970: Andy Kim, #17 US; 1971: Cissy Houston, #92 US, #31 R&B; 1986: Eddie Money, "Take Me Home Tonight", #4 US (Credited to Mick Leeson, Peter Vale, Barry, Greenwich and Spector. Contains extract from "Be My Baby"); 2005: Glitzzi Girlz, #95 UK
1963	"A Fine Fine Boy"	Darlene Love	53	29	-	Written by Jeff Barry, Ellie Greenwich, and Phil Spector
1963	"I Have a Boyfriend"	The Chiffons	36	6	-	Written by Jeff Barry, Ellie Greenwich, and The Tokens
1963	"That Boy John"	The Raindrops	64	-	-	
1963	"Hanky Panky"	The Raindrops	-	-	-	1966: Tommy James & the Shondells, #1 US,#39 R&B, #38 UK
1963	"Baby, I Love You"	The Ronettes	24	6	11	Written by Jeff Barry, Ellie Greenwich, and Phil Spector; 1969: Andy Kim, #9 US; 1973: Dave Edmunds, #8 UK; 1980: The Ramones, #8 UK; 1996: TSD, #64 UK
1963	"Christmas (Baby Please Come Home)"	Darlene Love	-	-	-	Written by Jeff Barry, Ellie Greenwich, and Phil Spector; 1974: Darlene Love, #51 UK; 2011: Michael Bublé, #47 UK
1964	"Do-Wah-Diddy"	The Exciters	78	47	-	1964: Manfred Mann, "Do Wah Diddy Diddy", #1 US, #1 UK; 1987: 2 Live Crew, #62 R&B; 1996: The Blue Melons, "Do Wah Diddy Diddy", #70 UK; 2001: DJ Ötzi, #9 UK
1964	"Little Boy"	The Crystals	92	32	-	Written by Jeff Barry, Ellie Greenwich, and Phil Spector
1964	"I Wonder"	The Crystals	-	-	36	Written by Jeff Barry, Ellie Greenwich, and Phil Spector
1964	"Chapel of Love"	The Dixie Cups	1	-	22	Written by Jeff Barry, Ellie Greenwich, and Phil Spector; 1973: Bette Midler, #40 US
1964	"I Wanna Love Him So Bad"	The Jelly Beans	9	7	-	
1964	"All Grown Up"	The Crystals	98	27	-	Written by Jeff Barry, Ellie Greenwich, and Phil Spector
1964	"The Kind of Boy You Can't Forget"	The Raindrops	95	-	-	
1964	"People Say"	The Dixie Cups	12	7	-	
1964	"Maybe I Know"	Lesley Gore	14	-	20	1972: The Seashells, #32 UK
1964	"Good Night Baby"	The Butterflys	51	-	-	Written by Jeff Barry, Ellie Greenwich, and Steve Venet
1964	"One More Tear"	The Raindrops	97	-	-	
1964	"Baby Be Mine"	The Jelly Beans	51	-	-	Written by Jeff Barry, Ellie Greenwich, and Steve Venet
1964	"Leader of the Pack"	The Shangri-Las	1	8	11	Written by Jeff Barry, Ellie Greenwich, and Shadow Morton; 1972: The Shangri-Las, #3 UK (reissue); 1976: The Shangri-Las, #7 UK (reissue); 1985: Twisted Sister, #53 US, #47 UK
1964	"Don't Ever Leave Me"	Connie Francis	42	-	-	
1964	"You Should Have Seen the Way He Looked at Me"	The Dixie Cups	39	-	-	
1964	"Leader of the Laundromat"	The Detergents	19	-	-	Parody of "Leader of the Pack" originally credited to Paul Vance and Lee Pockriss. A court later awarded a co-writing credit to Barry, Greenwich and Morton
1964	"Little Bell"	The Dixie Cups	51	21	-	
1964	"Look of Love"	Lesley Gore	27	-	-	
1965	"Out in the Streets"	The Shangri-Las	53	-	-	
1965	"He Ain't No Angel"	The Ad Libs	100	-	-	
1965	"Hold On Baby"	Sam Hawkins	-	10	-	
1965	"I'll Take You Where the Music's Playing"	The Drifters	51	-	-	
1966	"River Deep - Mountain High"	Ike & Tina Turner	88	-	3	Written by Jeff Barry, Ellie Greenwich, and Phil Spector; 1969: Deep Purple, #53 US; 1969: Ike & Tina Turner, #33 UK (reissue); 1970: The Supremes and the Four Tops, #14 US, #7 R&B, #11 UK
1966	"I Can Hear Music"	The Ronettes	100	-	-	Written by Jeff Barry, Ellie Greenwich, and Phil Spector; 1969: The Beach Boys, #24 US, #10 UK
1967	"I'll Never Need More Than This"	Ike & Tina Turner	114	-	64	Written by Jeff Barry, Ellie Greenwich, and Phil Spector

== Other chart hits and notable songs written by Jeff Barry alone or with others ==
Year	Song	Original artist	^{U.S. Pop}	^{U.S. R&B}	^{UK Singles Chart}	Other charting versions, and notes
1960	"Teenage Sonata"	Sam Cooke	50	22	-	Written by Jeff Barry
1960	"Tell Laura I Love Her"	Ray Peterson	7	-	-	Written by Jeff Barry and Ben Raleigh; 1960: Ricky Valance, #1 UK; 1974: Johnny T. Angel, #94 US
1960	"Tell Me What He Said"	Ginny Arnell	-	-	-	Written by Jeff Barry; 1962: Helen Shapiro, #2 UK
1962	"Chip Chip"	Gene McDaniels	10	-	-	Written by Jeff Barry, Clifford Crawford and Artie Resnick
1962	"I Left My Heart in the Balcony"	Linda Scott	74	-	-	Written by Jeff Barry and Artie Resnick
1967	"I Got to Go Back"	The McCoys	69	-	-	Written by Jeff Barry and Bert Russell
1967	"Am I Grooving You"	Freddie Scott	71	25	-	Written by Jeff Barry and Bert Russell
1968	"How'd We Ever Get This Way?"	Andy Kim	21	-	-	Written by Jeff Barry and Andy Kim
1968	"Shoot 'Em Up Baby"	Andy Kim	31	-	-	Written by Jeff Barry and Andy Kim
1968	"Bang-Shang-A-Lang"	The Archies	22	-	-	Written by Jeff Barry
1968	"Seventeen Ain't Young"	The Archies	-	-	-	Written by Jeff Barry
1968	"Rainbow Ride"	Andy Kim	49	-	-	Written by Jeff Barry and Andy Kim
1968	"Feelin' So Good (S.K.O.O.B.Y.-D.O.O.)"	The Archies	53	-	-	Written by Jeff Barry and Andy Kim
1969	"Did You See Her Eyes"	The Illusion	32	-	-	Written by Jeff Barry
1969	"Sugar, Sugar"	The Archies	1	-	1	Written by Jeff Barry and Andy Kim; 1970: Wilson Pickett, #25 US, #4 R&B; 1971: Sakkarin, #12 UK; 1987: The Archies, #91 UK (reissue); 1994: Duke Baysee, #30 UK
1969	"So Good Together"	Andy Kim	36	-	-	Written by Jeff Barry and Andy Kim
1969	"Jingle Jangle"	The Archies	10	-	-	Written by Jeff Barry and Andy Kim
1970	"A Friend in the City"	Andy Kim	90	-	-	Written by Jeff Barry and Andy Kim
1970	"Who's Your Baby"	The Archies	40	-	-	Written by Jeff Barry and Andy Kim
1970	"Lay a Little Lovin' on Me"	Robin McNamara	11	-	-	Written by Jeff Barry, Robin McNamara, and Jim Cretecos
1970	"Oh My My"	The Monkees	98	-	-	Written by Jeff Barry and Andy Kim
1970	"Sunshine"	The Archies	57	-	-	Written by Jeff Barry and Bobby Bloom
1970	"It's Your Life"	Andy Kim	85	-	-	Written by Jeff Barry and Andy Kim
1970	"Montego Bay"	Bobby Bloom	8	-	3	Written by Jeff Barry and Bobby Bloom; 1970: Freddie Notes & the Rudies, # 45 UK; 1978: Sugar Cane, #54 UK; 1986: Amazulu, #16 UK
1971	"Heavy Makes You Happy"	Bobby Bloom	80	-	31	Written by Jeff Barry and Bobby Bloom; 1971: The Staple Singers: #27 US, #6 R&B
1971	"I Wish I Were"	Andy Kim	62	-	-	Written by Jeff Barry and Andy Kim
1971	"We're All Goin' Home"	Bobby Bloom	93	-	-	Written by Jeff Barry, Bobby Bloom and Neil Goldberg
1971	"I Been Moved"	Andy Kim	97	-	-	Written by Jeff Barry and Andy Kim
1972	"A Brand New Song"	Cliff Richard	-	-	51	Written by Jeff Barry and Paul Williams
1973	"Sister James"	Nino Tempo & the 5th Avenue Sax	53	-	78	Written by Jeff Barry and Antonino Lotempio
1974	"I Really Got It Bad for You"	The Persuasions	-	56	-	Written by Jeff Barry and Bobby Bloom
1974	"Out of Hand"	Gary Stewart	-	-	-	Written by Jeff Barry and Tom Jans #4 Country
1974	"Wake Up and Love Me"	April Stevens	93	-	-	Written by Jeff Barry, April Stevens and Nino Tempo
1974	"I Honestly Love You"	Olivia Newton-John	1	-	22	Written by Jeff Barry and Peter Allen; 1977: Olivia Newton-John, #48 US (reissue); 1978: The Staples, #68 R&B; 1983: Olivia Newton-John, #52 UK (reissue); 1998: Olivia Newton-John, #67 US (reissue)
1976	"Saying Hello, Saying I Love You, Saying Goodbye"	Jim Ed Brown and Helen Cornelius	-	-	-	Written by Jeff Barry, Dene Hofheinz and Brad Burg #2 Country
1984	"The Last Time I Made Love"	Joyce Kennedy and Jeffrey Osborne	40	2	-	Written by Jeff Barry, Barry Mann and Cynthia Weil
1985	"Lie to You for Your Love"	The Bellamy Brothers	-	-	-	Written by Jeff Barry and Frankie Miller #2 Country
2002	"Whoa Now"	B Rich	98	-	-	Written by Brian Rich, Ron Hall, Jeff Barry and Janet DuBois
2004	"Nasty Girl"	Nitty	87	99	-	Written by Jeff Barry, Andy Kim and Frank Ross

== Other chart hits and notable songs written by Ellie Greenwich alone or with others ==
Year	Song	Original artist	^{U.S. Pop}	^{U.S. R&B}	^{UK Singles Chart}	Other charting versions, and notes
1963	"Why Do Lovers Break Each Other's Heart?"	Bob B. Soxx & the Blue Jeans	38	-	-	Written by Ellie Greenwich, Phil Spector and Tony Powers; 1980: Showaddywaddy, #22 UK
1963	"He's Got the Power"	The Exciters	57	-	-	Written by Ellie Greenwich and Tony Powers
1963	"One Boy Too Late"	Mike Clifford	96	-	-	Written by Ellie Greenwich and Tony Powers
1968	"Sunshine After the Rain"	Ellie Greenwich	-	-	-	Written by Ellie Greenwich; 1977: Elkie Brooks, #10 UK; 1994: New Atlantic / U4EA, #26 UK; 1995: Berri, #4 UK
1983	"Keep It Confidential"	Nona Hendryx	91	22	-	Written by Ellie Greenwich, Jeff Kent and Ellen Foley
