= This Is Love =

This Is Love may refer to:

== Albums ==
- This Is Love (Johnny Mathis album) or the title song, 1964
- This Is Love (Lee Ritenour album), 1998
- This Is Love (EP), by Sanctus Real, or the title song, 2016
- This Is Love, by the Archies, or the title song, 1971
- This Is Love, by Super Junior, a reissue of the album Mamacita, 2014

== Songs ==
- "This Is Love" (Gary Numan song), 1986
- "This Is Love" (George Harrison song), 1988
- "This Is Love" (Hikaru Utada song), 2006
- "This Is Love" (PJ Harvey song), 2001
- "This Is Love" (Super Junior song), 2014
- "This Is Love" (will.i.am song), 2012
- "This Is Love", by Demy, representing Greece in the Eurovision Song Contest 2017
- "This Is Love", by Dido from Still on My Mind, 2019
- "This Is Love", by Kelly Rowland from Ms. Kelly, 2007
- "This Is Love", by Kelly Rowland from Talk a Good Game, 2013
- "This Is Love", by Kim Hyun-joong, 2019
- "This Is Love", by Lady Kash, 2013, remake of the will.i.am song
- "This Is Love", by Mary Chapin Carpenter from Stones in the Road, 1994
- "This Is Love", by Paul Anka, 1978
- "This Is Love", by Tony Banks from The Fugitive, 1983
- "Yeh Hai Ishq Ishq" (lit. 'This Is Love'), by Roshan, Manna Dey, Mohammed Rafi, S. D. Batish and Sudha Malhotra from the Indian film Barsaat Ki Raat, 1960

== Other uses ==
- This Is Love (2009 film), a German film
- This Is Love (1958 film), an Egyptian film
- This Is Love (podcast), a podcast that investigates stories of love
- Yeh Hai Aashiqui (lit. 'This Is Love'), an Indian romantic drama television series
- Yeh Hai Chahatein (lit. 'This Is Love'), an Indian romantic drama television series
- Yeh Hai Mohabbatein (lit. 'This Is Love'), an Indian romantic drama television series

== See also ==
- So This Is Love (disambiguation)
- Is This Love? (disambiguation)
- This Love (disambiguation)
