= Teja =

Teja may refer to:

== Places ==
- Isla Teja, an island in Chile
- La Teja, a neighbourhood of Montevideo, Uruguay
- Teja, Perak, Malaysia
- Teja Kalan, a village in Batala in Gurdaspur district of Punjab State, India
- Teja Khurd, a village in Batala in Gurdaspur district of Punjab State, India
- Veela Teja, a village in Batala in Gurdaspur district of Punjab State, India
- Teja (state constituency), state constituency in Perak, Malaysia

== People ==
- Dwaraka Ravi Teja (born 1987), Indian cricketer
- Hari Teja (born 1989), Telugu actress
- Mihai Teja (born 1978), Romanian footballer and manager
- Neftalí Teja Cisneros (born 1991), Mexican former professional footballer, known as Neftalí Teja
- Ram Charan Teja, Telugu film actor
- Ravi Teja (born 1968), an Indian film hero who works mainly in Tollywood
- Ravi Teja (cricketer) (born 1994), Indian cricketer
- Suddala Ashok Teja (born 1954), Telugu lyricist
- Teia or Teja (died 552 or 553), Ostrogothic king in Italy
- Teja (film director) (born 1966), Telugu film director
- Teja Belak (born 1994), Slovenian artistic gymnast
- Teja Černe (born 1984), Slovenian Olympic sailor
- Teja Devkar, Marathi TV and film actress
- Teja Melink (born 1980), Slovenian pole vaulter
- Teja Paku Alam (born 1994), Indonesian footballer
- Teja Singh (disambiguation)
- Teja Zupan (born 1990), Slovenian Olympic swimmer

== Other uses ==
- Dharma Teja, a 1989 Indian Telugu-language film by Perala
- Teja (film), a 1992 Indian Telugu-language thriller film
- Teja TV, an Indian television channel broadcasting in Telugu
- Teja (confectionery), a confectionery from Peru and Spain
- Veer Teja or Tejaji, a folk deity of Rajasthan, India
- Teja, the primary antagonist in the 1973 Indian film Zanjeer and its 2013 remake
- Teja, a fictional villain in the 1994 Indian film Andaaz Apna Apna

== See also ==
- Tejas (disambiguation)
