= Archies =

Archies may refer to:

- Archie (franchise), a media franchise created by American publisher Archie Comics
  - Archie (comic book)
  - The Archie Show, a 1968 animated TV series
  - The Archies, a fictional garage band, and associated virtual band made up of studio musicians
    - The Archies (album), 1968
  - The New Archies, a 1987 TV animated TV series
  - The Archies (film), a 2023 Indian film
    - The Archies (soundtrack), its soundtrack by Shankar–Ehsaan–Loy, Ankur Tewari, The Islanders and Aditi "Dot" Saigal
- Archies (company), an Indian greeting card company
- The Gothic Archies, a self-described goth-bubblegum band
- Archies Creek, a small town in Victoria, Australia

== See also ==
- Archie (disambiguation)
