= Tejas =

Tejas may refer to:

== Places ==
- Texas, a U.S. state
- Spanish Texas, colonial province
- Mexican Texas, territory of post-independence Mexico
  - Coahuila y Tejas, a state under the 1824 Mexican constitution that included the region of present-day Texas
- Tejas, Humacao, Puerto Rico, a barrio
- Tejas, Las Piedras, Puerto Rico, a barrio
- Tejas, Yabucoa, Puerto Rico, a barrio

== People ==
- Tejas, a Native American tribe of the Hasinai confederation of North America (present day Texas)
- Vernon Tejas, American mountain climber and mountain guide

== Arts, entertainment, media ==
- Tejas (album), by ZZ Top
- Tejas (film), a Bollywood film
- Tejas (musician), an Indian singer-songwriter and guitarist

== Transportation and vehicular ==
- Tejas Express train of India
- HAL Tejas, an Indian combat aircraft

== Other uses ==
- Tejas, roofing tiles used in late (post-1790) California mission architecture
- Tejas and Jayhawk, code names for a microprocessor developed by Intel
- Tejas Club, a student organization at the University of Texas at Austin

== See also ==
- Teja (disambiguation)
- Teyas
- Texas (disambiguation)
- Teas (disambiguation)
