= The Archies Christmas Album =

Studio album by The Archies
- Released: September 30, 2008
- Recorded: 2008
- Genre: Pop
- Length: 37:17
- Label: Fuel 2000
- Producer: Ron Dante

The Archies chronology
This is Love (1971)	The Archies Christmas Album (2008)

The Archies Christmas Album is the sixth studio album by The Archies, a fictional bubblegum pop band from Archie Comics released in 2008 via Fuel 2000.

== Background ==
While it mostly includes new studio musicians, it is the first album in 37 years credited to The Archies, since 1971's This Is Love. It was produced by Ron Dante and released on the Fuel 2000 label on September 30, 2008. It features vocals from Dante back as Archie, as well as two new teen singers: Danielle Van Zyl as Betty and Kelly-Lynn as Veronica.

With the exception of the last two original songs which directly reference the Archie comic book, the album consists of covers of popular Christmas songs, performed in a more contemporary style by the band.

This album was released to coincide with the 40th anniversary of their eponymous debut album The Archies and not exactly for Christmas 2008, possibly influenced by the 1910 Fruitgum Company album, Bubblegum Christmas released the previous year.

However, unlike that album, this one was not an attempt to recreate the old and classic bubblegum sound of the original Archies. Instead, they use programming, synthesizers and distorted guitars, with a predominance of female lead vocals.

== Track listing ==
No.	Title	Length
1.	"Here Comes Santa Claus"
2.	"Up on the Housetop"
3.	"Rockin' Around the Christmas Tree"
4.	"Holly Jolly Christmas"
5.	"Jingle Bell Rock"
6.	"I Saw Mommy Kissing Santa Claus"
7.	"Run Rudolph Run"
8.	"Santa Claus Is Coming to Town"
9.	"Have Yourself a Merry Little Christmas"
10.	"Sleigh Ride"
11.	"Archies Christmas Party"
12.	"Christmas in Riverdale"

== Personnel ==
- Danielle van Zyl – vocals
- Kelly-Lynn – vocals
- Ron Dante – vocals
- Ted Perlman – programmer, keys and guitar
- Scott Erickson – programmer and keys
- Tim Pierce – guitar
- Bo Donaldson – keyboards
- George Eisaman – guitar
- Rick Thibodeau – bass
- Billy Haarbauer – drums
