= Nasty Girl (Nitty song) =

2004 single by Nitty

Single by Nitty

from the album Player's Paradise
- B-side: "Wind It Up"
- Released: August 30, 2004
- Studio: Nezz (The Bronx, New York); Integrated (New York City)
- Length: 4:00
- Label: Universal
- Songwriters: Frank Ross; Jeff Barry; Andy Kim
- Producers: Frank Ross; Robert "Nezz" Martinez

Nitty singles chronology
"Hey Bitty" (2004)	"Nasty Girl" (2004)	"Hey Bitty" (2005)

"Nasty Girl" is a song by American rapper Nitty. It is the third track on his second studio album, Player's Paradise (2005), and was released as the album's second single on August 30, 2004. Despite failing to enter the top 75 in the United States, it reached number one in Australia for two weeks and peaked within the top 40 in Austria, Denmark, Germany, and Switzerland. It received a platinum sales certification in Australia and a gold certification in the US.

== Composition ==
There are four verses, including three similar verses and a different final verse. The song interpolates the 1969 hit song "Sugar, Sugar" by the Archies.

== Music video ==
The music video features Nitty driving a red Cadillac convertible to a gas station. Here, two girls fill his car while Nitty begins to sing.

== Track listings ==
US CD single

1. "Nasty Girl" (main) – 4:00
2. "Nasty Girl" (instrumental) – 4:05
3. "Nasty Girl" (acappella) – 4:07
4. Call out hook – 0:20

European CD single

1. "Nasty Girl" – 4:00
2. "Wind It Up" – 4:01

Australian CD single

1. "Nasty Girl" – 4:00
2. "Nasty Girl" (Lift remix) – 5:22
3. "Wind It Up" – 4:01
4. "Nasty Girl" (video)

== Credits and personnel ==
Credits are lifted from the US CD single liner notes.

Studios

- Recorded at Nezz Studios (The Bronx, New York) and Integrated Studios (New York City)
- Mixed at Integrated Studios (New York City)

Personnel

- Frank Ross (Nitty) – writing, vocals, background vocals, drums, production, programming
- Jeff Barry – writer of "Sugar, Sugar"
- Andy Kim – writer of "Sugar, Sugar"
- Michael Moog – background vocals, co-production
- Maria Taylor – background vocals
- Adam Podrat – guitar
- Jesse Graham – bass
- Robert "Nezz" Martinez – drums, production, programming, recording
- Josh Brochhausen – recording, mixing
- Derek Pacuk – mixing

== Charts ==
=== Weekly charts ===
Chart (2004–2005)	Peak position
Australia (ARIA)	1
Australian Urban (ARIA)	1
Austria (Ö3 Austria Top 40)	29
Belgium (Ultratip Bubbling Under Flanders)	17
Denmark (Tracklisten)	16
Germany (GfK)	21
Netherlands (Dutch Top 40 Tipparade)	12
Netherlands (Single Top 100)	98
Switzerland (Schweizer Hitparade)	26
US Billboard Hot 100	87
US Hot R&B/Hip-Hop Singles & Tracks (Billboard)	99
US Mainstream Top 40 (Billboard)	29

=== Year-end charts ===
Chart (2005)	Position
Australia (ARIA)	8
Australian Urban (ARIA)	5

== Certifications ==
Region	Certification	Certified units/sales
Australia (ARIA)	Platinum	70,000^{^}
United States (RIAA)	Gold	500,000^{*}
^{*} Sales figures based on certification alone.^{^} Shipments figures based on certification alone.

== Release history ==
Region	Date	Format(s)	Label(s)	Ref.
United States	August 30, 2004	Rhythmic contemporary; contemporary hit radio	Universal	
United States	August 31, 2004	Maxi-CD	Universal	
Australia	January 17, 2005	CD	Universal	
