= Player's Paradise =

Studio album by Nitty
- Released: March 8, 2005
- Genre: Pop-rap; East Coast hip hop
- Length: 43:47
- Label: Rostrum; Universal
- Producer: Nitty; Michael Moog

Nitty chronology
It's Not a Game (2004)	Player's Paradise (2005)

Singles from Player's Paradise
- 1. "Hey Bitty" Released: January 18, 2005

Professional ratings
Review scores
Source	Rating
AllMusic	2.5/5 stars
RapReviews	5/10

Player's Paradise is the second album by American rapper and producer Nitty. The album peaked at number 30 on the Billboard Top Heatseekers chart. The song "Hey Bitty" appears on NBA Street Vol. 3.

== Track listing ==
1. "ABC" – 3:52
2. "Hey Bitty" – 2:49
3. "Nasty Girl" – 4:08
4. "Like That" – 3:31
5. "Sorry" – 4:10
6. "Hey Girl" – 4:12
7. "Wind It Up" – 3:53
8. "Move Your Body" – 4:13
9. "Player at Work (Interlude)" – 0:39
10. "Unh!" – 3:59
11. "Fly" – 4:24
12. "It's Official" – 3:57

== Samples ==
- "ABC" contains a sample of Grace Jones' "My Jamaican Guy".
- "Nasty Girl" contains a sample of The Archies' "Sugar, Sugar".
- "Hey Bitty" contains a sample of Toni Basil's "Mickey".
- "Sorry" contains a sample of Michael Jackson's "I Wanna Be Where You Are".
- "Like That" contains a sample of Culture Club's "Do You Really Want to Hurt Me".
