= Universal Music Publishing Group =

American music publishing company

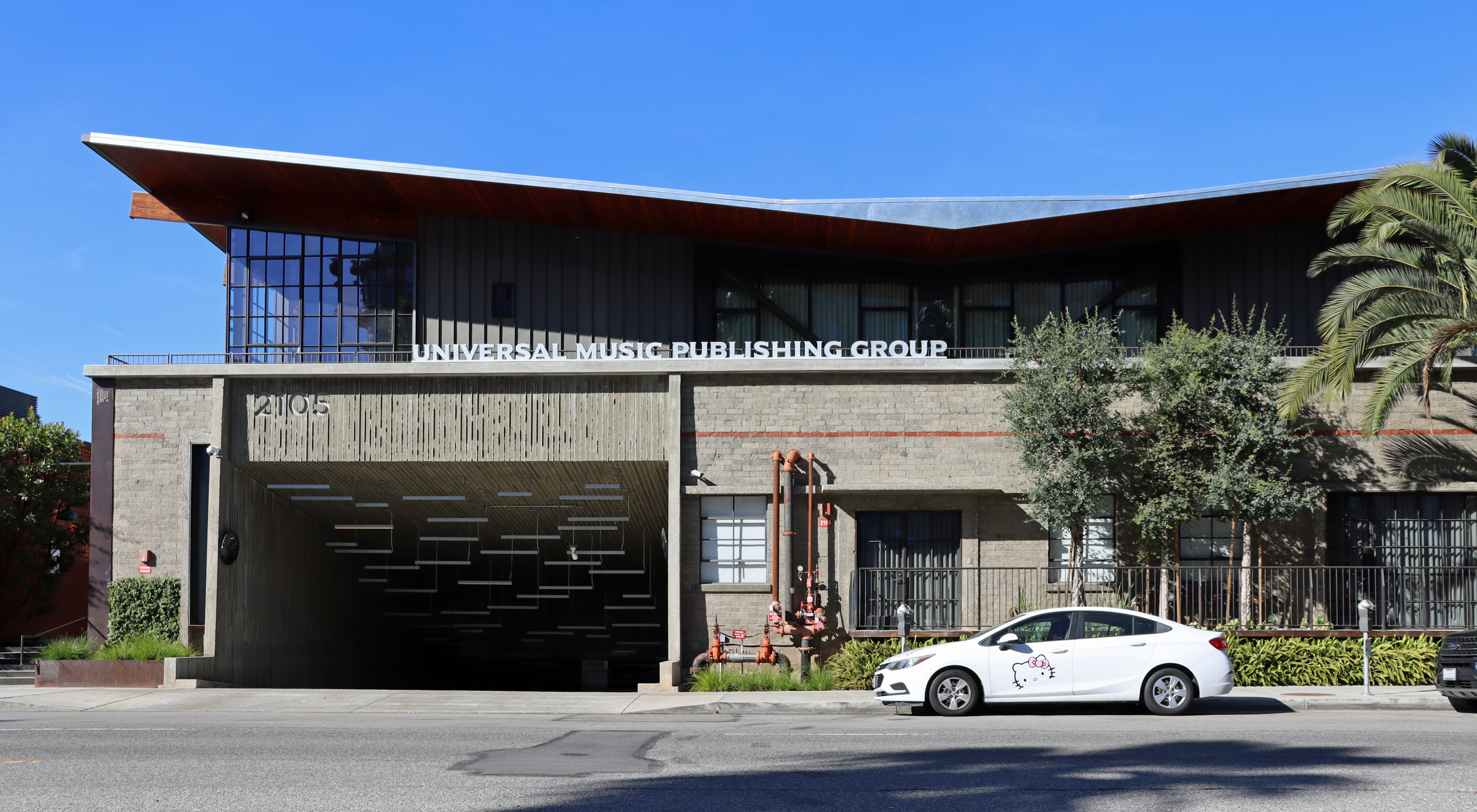
- Headquarters in Santa Monica
- Industry: Music industry
- Predecessor: BMG Music Publishing; PolyGram Music Publishing; MCA Music Publishing
- Founded: 1972; 54 years ago 1999; 27 years ago(Name change)
- Headquarters: Santa Monica, California, U.S.
- Area served: Worldwide
- Key people: Jody Gerson (chairman and CEO); Marc Cimino (COO); JW Beekman (CFO)
- Services: Music publishing
- Parent: Universal Music Group
- Divisions: Universal Production Music; Universal Music - Z Tunes LLC (ex-Zomba); Universal MGB Publishing (ex-BMG); Universal Songs of PolyGram; Songs of Universal, Inc.
- Website: umusicpub.com

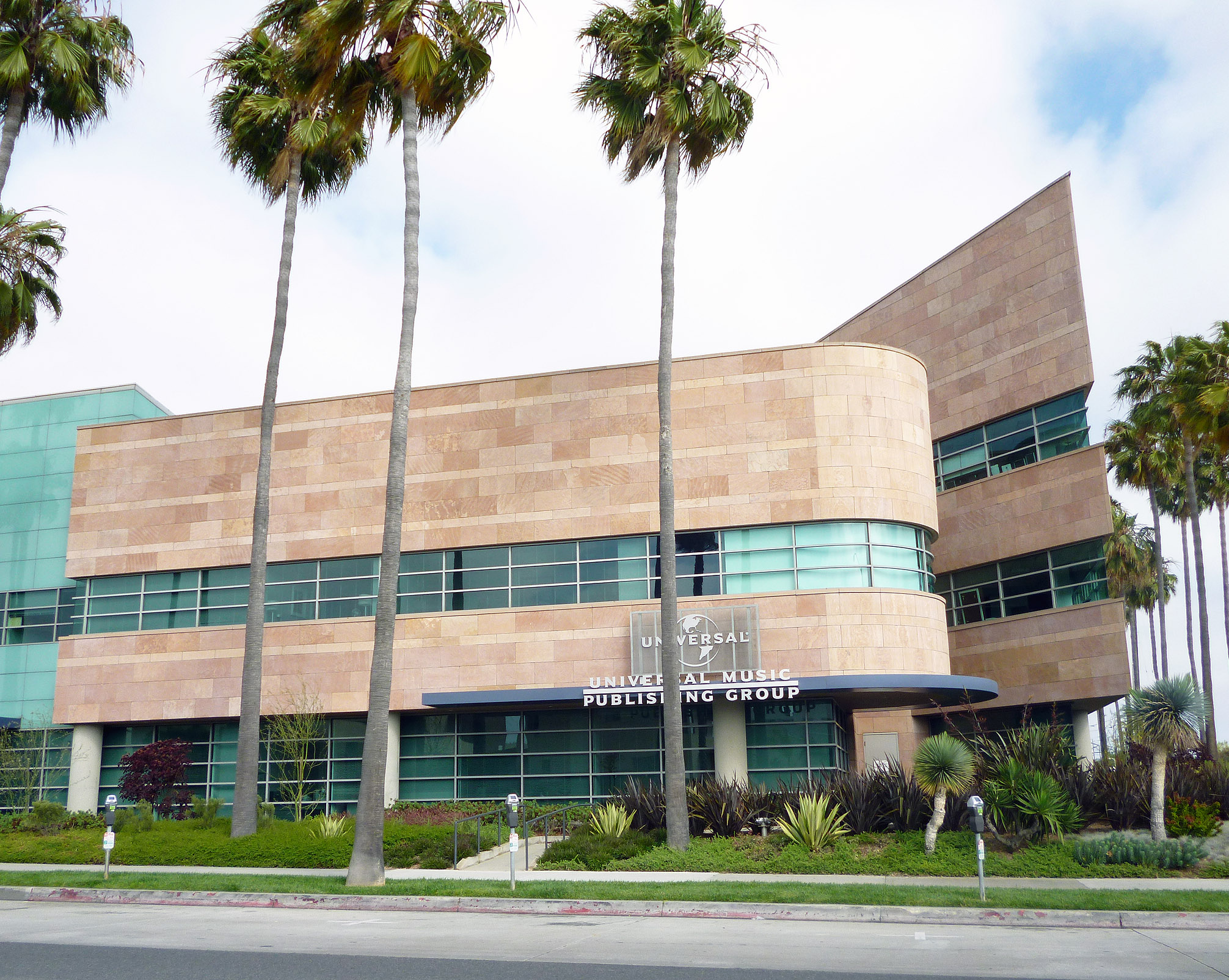
Former headquarters in Santa Monica

Universal Music Publishing Group (UMPG) is a global music publishing company and is part of the Universal Music Group. Universal Music Publishing has been ranked the #1 music publisher in market share by Billboard for multiple consecutive quarters.

The company is home to major songwriters and artists, including Adele, Bad Bunny, Coldplay, Drake, Elton John, Kendrick Lamar, Post Malone, Harry Styles, Taylor Swift, SZA, Rosalía and the Weeknd. UMPG has recently made historic catalogue acquisitions, including Bob Dylan, Sting and Neil Diamond. UMPG's catalogue consists of over four million songs, with offices in 40 countries.

== History ==
Former logo of UMPG used from 1998 to 2026

UMPG was formerly known as MCA Music Publishing. MCA had been in the music publishing business since 1964, when it acquired Lou Levy's Leeds Music. In 1979, MCA acquired ABC Records and its catalog was added to MCA Music Publishing. In the 1990s, MCA Music Publishing expanded by acquiring catalogs such as All Nations Music and the publishing of Interscope Records and Manny Records.

MCA merged with PolyGram in 1998 when Seagram acquired PolyGram for $10.4 billion. PolyGram's music business was merged into Seagram's MCA Records. The merger was effected in January 1999, forming a new company named Universal Music Group. The merger also included both record labels' music publishers. The PolyGram catalog included Dick James Music, Welk Music, Cedarwood Publishing, and Sweden Music.

In August 2000, UMPG acquired Rondor Music from Herb Alpert and Jerry Moss for roughly $400 million. It included former music publishing arms of A&M Records, I.R.S. Records, Stax Records, and Shelter Records, as well as Sea of Tunes. The purchase added 60,000 copyrights to Universal's library.

In 2006, Universal Music Publishing Group acquired BMG Music Publishing from Bertelsmann Music Group for €1.63 billion, back then the third largest publishing group in the world, making Universal Music the largest music publisher in the world. It included the catalogs of Éditions Durand and Casa Ricordi and former music publishing arms of Benson Records and Zomba. As part of the acquisition of BMG Music Publishing, Universal divested the catalogues of Zomba UK (and the European rights to Zomba USA), Rondor UK, 19 Music and BBC to a new company named Imagem (now part of Concord Music Publishing). Sony/ATV Music Publishing overtook Universal Music Publishing as the world's largest music publisher in 2013 after acquiring EMI Music Publishing.

On May 7, 2013, UMPG acquired American music publisher Criterion Music Corporation.

On January 1, 2015, Jody Gerson was named the chairman and CEO of Universal Music Publishing Group, becoming the first woman CEO of a global music company and the first female to run a major music publishing company. Gerson made history as the first publishing executive and first woman to be named Billboard's 'Executive of the Year' for their Power 100 list. She was also named Variety Hitmakers' Executive of the Year in 2019. In December 2015, she was named Executive of the Year by Billboard Magazine in its Women in Music issue.

In 2018 Disney Music Publishing and UMPG expanded their business relationship to the continental Europe, the United Kingdom, Israel and Ireland, as well as countries in the Caribbean and Africa.

In March 2023, UMPG was ranked No. 1 on Billboard's Publishers Quarterly on the Hot 100 for the third consecutive quarter, which is taken from official Hot 100 chart data. Additionally, the portfolio publisher made history holding more than 30% market share for the past three quarters, a record that has not been achieved by any publisher since 2014.

On February 27, 2024, TikTok announced that its license to use UMPG's catalogue would expire on March 1. At the beginning of February 2024, Universal Music Group had removed its entire recorded catalogue from the app.

== Services ==
UMPG is the music publishing partner of many film/TV studios globally, including Universal Pictures, Warner Bros. Pictures, Lionsgate, MGM, Paramount, Disney Europe (and other territories), Viacom, Amazon, HBO, DreamWorks, DreamWorks Animation, Legendary Pictures, MarVista Entertainment, NBC, and Sesame Workshop, among many others.

UMPG administers the 60,000 title Rondor Music Catalog and also owns or administers a multitude of others including: Interscope and Def Jam Music, WildBrain, Amazon MGM Studios and Metro-Goldwyn-Mayer, All Nations Music, Charlie Daniels, Casa Ricordi, Matraca Berg, DreamWorks Animation, HBO, Paramount Global (excluding CBS and Showtime Networks), Warner Bros., Sesame Street, Lionsgate, Disney Music Publishing, Forerunner Music, Epitaph Records, Greenwich/Barry, Momentum Publishing, and John Philips. UMPG also owns or administers the works of Leonard Bernstein and Henry Mancini, and Dsign Music.

== International ==
UMPG has 48 offices across 40 countries around the world. Universal Music Publishing Group Australia & NZ is based in Sydney, New South Wales, Australia. Marianna Annas, former Head of ABC Music Publishing until January 2020, is as of June 2021 Vice President, Commercial & Creative at the company.
