= Don't Ever Leave Me (Connie Francis song) =

Single by Connie Francis

from the album Rocksides (1957-1964)
- B-side: "We Have Something More (Than a Summer Love)"
- Released: October 1964
- Recorded: September 15, 1964, New York City, NY
- Genre: Pop
- Length: 2:46
- Label: MGM; K 13287
- Songwriters: Jeff Barry; Ellie Greenwich
- Producers: Jeff Barry; Ellie Greenwich

Connie Francis singles chronology
"Looking for Love" (1964)	"Don't Ever Leave Me" (1964)	"Whose Heart Are You Breaking Tonight?" (1965)

Audio
- "Don't Ever Leave Me" on YouTube

Professional ratings
Review scores
Source	Rating
Record World	4/5 stars
Billboard	Positive (Hot Pop)
Cashbox	Positive (Pick of the Week)

"Don't Ever Leave Me" is a song written by Jeff Barry and Ellie Greenwich and most notably performed by Connie Francis, who released it as a single under MGM Records in late 1964, with a positive reception and a moderate chart presence. The song was included in Francis' 1987 Rocksides and 2005 Gold albums, whilst also making an appearance on Da Doo Ron Ron: More from the Ellie Greenwich & Jeff Barry Songbook, a compilation album featuring the most popular compositions by the songwriting duo.

== Connie Francis version ==
MGM advertisement for the single, the advert notes the credits of the songs and the picture used is from her picture session for A New Kind of Connie....

=== Release and reception ===
Following the success of "Looking for Love" Francis would release "Don't Ever Leave Me" as a seven inch single in October 1964 under MGM Records. It was backed by another pop song, "We Have Something More (Than a Summer Love)" on the B-side, which didn't see any album inclusions. It was produced by Mickey Gentile and arranged by Bert Keyes. "Don't Ever Leave Me" was arranged by Artie Butler and produced by the song's songwriters. Both songs utilized a double tracking recording technique.

The single was met with a positive critical reception upon its release. Billboard magazine said that the "First side has a powerful beat coupled with dual-tracked vocal." Also noting, "Flip also has a big arrangement but less emphasis on beat. Tender reading." Cashbox reviewed the single in mid October and said that it "should send Connie zooming back up to the top of the charts." Stating "It's by far her most powerful entry in some time. It's a sensational thump-a-rhythmic rocker that the lark socks out in fabulous multi-track manner. Smash-makers Jeff Barry & Ellie Greenwich produced this deck that sports a sparkling Artie Butler ork-choral arrangement." Also noting, "However, don't overlook the Bert Keyes-arranged 'We Have Something More (Than a Summer Love).' It's a charming cha-cha-shuffler, produced by Mickey Gentile, that also has a top-ten outlook." Record World gave the single four stars and believed that "Connie has a pretty song she ought to take far up the charts. It's a grand tune with solid production ideas, too."

=== Chart performance ===
"Don't Ever Leave Me" debuted on the Billboard Hot 100 on October 24, 1964, reaching No. 42 during a seven-week run. The single was ranked higher on the Cashbox Top 100 Singles, where it reached the top-40 and peaked at No. 37. It was ranked lower on the Record World 100 Top Pop singles chart, where it reached No. 46. Unlike the previous "Looking for Love", the single wouldn't chart in other countries. "Don't Ever Leave Me" was among seventeen Jeff Barry–Ellie Greenwich compositions that charted on the pop charts in 1964.

The single's B-side, "We Have Something More (Than a Summer Love)", bubbled under the Billboard Hot 100 on October 31, 1964, reaching No. 128. The song was ranked higher on Record World, where it peaked at No. 86 during its one-week appearance on the chart.

=== Track listing ===
7" vinyl single

- "Don't Ever Leave Me" – 2:46
- "We Have Something More (Than a Summer Love)" – 2:18

== Charts ==
Chart performance for "Don't Ever Leave Me"
Chart (1964)	Peak position
US Billboard Hot 100	42
US Cashbox Top 100 Singles	37
US Record World 100 Top Pops	46

Chart performance for "We Have Something More"
Chart (1964)	Peak position
US Billboard Bubbling Under Hot 100	128
US Record World 100 Top Pops	86
