= Sunshine (The Archies song) =

1970 song performed by The Archies

Single by The Archies

from the album Sunshine
- B-side: "Over And Over"
- Released: June 20, 1970
- Recorded: 1970
- Genre: Bubblegum pop
- Length: 3:16
- Label: Kirshner
- Songwriter(s): Jeff Barry; Bobby Bloom
- Producer(s): Jeff Barry

The Archies singles chronology
"Who's Your Baby?" (1970)	"Sunshine" (1970)	"Together We Two" (1970)

"Sunshine" is a song written by Jeff Barry and Bobby Bloom, produced by Barry and recorded by The Archies, a fictional bubblegum pop band from Archie Comics. It was released as the group's sixth single on the Kirshner Records label in 1970, and included on their fourth album, Sunshine. It peaked at No. 57 on the Billboard Hot 100 chart; it is their last Hot 100 hit to date.

== Charts ==
Chart (1970)	Peak position
US Billboard Hot 100	57

== Cover versions ==
Singaporean band Black Dog Bone covered the song entitled "Si Gadis Ayu".
