= Is It Love =

Is It Love or Is It Love? may refer to:

== Music ==
- Is It Love? (album), an album by Cilla Black
- Is It Love? Ultra Naté Best Remixes, Vol. 1, an album by Ultra Naté

=== Songs ===
- "Is It Love" (Mr. Mister song), 1986
- "Is It Love" (Twenty 4 Seven song), 1993
- "Is It Love?" (Chili Hi Fly song), 1998
- "Is It Love?" (iiO song), 2006
- "Is It Love" (Loreen song), 2023
- "Is It Love" (Tyla song), 2026
- "Is It Love", a single by Gang of Four from the 1983 album Hard
- "Is It Love?", a song by Graham Central Station from 1978 album My Radio Sure Sounds Good to Me
- "Is It Love", a song by Kendrick Lamar from his 2009 extended play Kendrick Lamar
- "Is It Love", a song by Bette Midler from her 1983 album No Frills
- "Is It Love", a song by Fitz and the Tantrums from their 2022 album Let Yourself Free
- "Is It Love", a song by Pink from her 2000 album Can't Take Me Home
- "Is It Love", a song by Play from the 2002 album Play (Play album)
- "Is It Love?", a song by Cilla Black from the film Ferry Cross the Mersey 1965
- "Is It Love", a song by Foster and Lloyd 1990
- "Is It Love", a song by T. Rex, B-side to "Ride a White Swan"
- "Is It Love", a song by Lisa Stewart from her 1992 album Lisa Stewart

== See also ==
- Is This Love? (disambiguation), the name of several songs
