= Who's Your Baby? =

Single by The Archies

from the album The Archies Greatest Hits
- B-side: "Senorita Rita"
- Released: February 28, 1970
- Recorded: 1970
- Genre: Bubblegum pop
- Length: 2:49
- Label: Kirshner
- Songwriters: Jeff Barry; Andy Kim
- Producer: Jeff Barry

The Archies singles chronology
"Jingle Jangle" (1969)	"Who's Your Baby?" (1970)	"Sunshine" (1970)

"Who's Your Baby?" is a song written by Jeff Barry and Andy Kim, produced by Barry and recorded by The Archies, a fictional bubblegum pop band from Archie Comics. It is a non-album single, released on the Kirshner Records label on February 28, 1970. Its B-side, "Senorita Rita", was included on the group's third album, Jingle Jangle. It peaked at No. 40 on the Billboard Hot 100 chart. It is their last top 40 hit.

== Chart performance ==
Chart (1970)	Peak position
US Billboard Hot 100	40
US Cash Box Top 100	29
