= Together We Two =

Single by The Archies

from the album This Is Love
- B-side: "Everything's Alright"
- Released: December 21, 1970
- Recorded: 1970
- Genre: Bubblegum pop
- Length: 2:35
- Label: Kirshner
- Songwriters: Jeff Barry; Andy Kim
- Producer: Jeff Barry

The Archies singles chronology
"Sunshine" (1970)	"Together We Two" (1970)	"A Summer Prayer For Peace" (1970)

"Together We Two" is a song written by Jeff Barry and Andy Kim, produced by Barry and recorded by The Archies, a fictional bubblegum pop band from Archie Comics. It was released as the group's seventh single on the Kirshner Records label on December 21, 1970, and included on their fifth album, This Is Love. It failed to chart the Billboard Hot 100, peaking at No. 22 on the Bubbling Under Singles chart.

== Charts ==
Chart (1971)	Peak position
US Bubbling Under Hot 100 Singles	22
