= Feelin' So Good (S.K.O.O.B.Y.-D.O.O.) =

Single by The Archies

from the album Everything's Archie
- B-side: "Love Light"
- Released: December 14, 1968
- Recorded: 1968
- Genre: Bubblegum pop
- Length: 2:56
- Label: Calendar
- Songwriters: Jeff Barry; Andy Kim
- Producer: Jeff Barry

The Archies singles chronology
"Bang-Shang-A-Lang" (1968)	"Feelin' So Good (S.K.O.O.B.Y.-D.O.O.)" (1968)	"Sugar, Sugar" (1969)

"Feelin' So Good (S.K.O.O.B.Y.-D.O.O.)" is a song written by Jeff Barry and Andy Kim, produced by Barry and recorded by The Archies, a fictional bubblegum pop band from Archie Comics. It was released as the group's second single on the Calendar Records label on December 14, 1968, and included on their second album, Everything's Archie. It peaked at No. 53 on the Billboard Hot 100 chart.

The song is about the narrator's love for a girl named "Skooby-Doo" ("That's my girl, her name is Skooby-Doo"). Her name is spelled out (albeit without a hyphen, as in the printed title) in the middle portion of the song. This 1968 song predates the first appearance of the similarly-named (but male) popular cartoon character Scooby-Doo by about a year.

== Charts ==
Chart (1969)	Peak position
US Billboard Hot 100	53
