= This Love =

This Love may refer to:

== Albums ==
- This Love (album), a 2006 album by Khalil Fong

== Songs ==
- "This Love" (Angela Aki song), 2006
- "This Love" (Bad Company song), 1986
- "This Love" (Craig Armstrong song), 1998
- "This Love" (LeAnn Rimes song), 2004
- "This Love" (Maroon 5 song), 2004
- "This Love" (Pantera song), 1992
- "This Love" (Taylor Swift song), 2014
- "This Love" (The Veronicas song), 2008
- "This Love", by Big Bang, from the album Big Bang
- "This Love", by Camila Cabello, from the album Romance (2019)
- "This Love", by Daniel Ash, from the album Coming Down
- "This Love", by Golden Earring, from the album Tits 'n Ass
- "This Love", by Lou Rhodes, from the album Bloom
- "This Love", by The Magic Numbers, from their eponymous album
- "This Love", by Meghan Trainor, from the album Only 17
- "This Love", by Mary Mary, from the album Incredible
- "This Love", by Shinhwa, from the album The Classic
- "This Love", covered by Ryan Adams, from the album 1989
- "This Love (Will Be Your Downfall)", a song by Ellie Goulding, from her debut album, Lights
- "This Love", by Davichi, from the original soundtrack of Descendants of the Sun, 2016
- "Yeh Jo Mohabbat Hai" (lit. 'This Love'), a song by R. D. Burman and Kishore Kumar from the 1971 Indian film Kati Patang
- "Move (Yeh Ishq Ishq)" lit. 'Move (This Love Love)', a song by Shashwat Sachdev, Reble, Sonu Nigam and Roshan from the 2025 Indian film Dhurandhar, remake of Roshan's "Yeh Hai Ishq Ishq" (lit. 'This Is Love') from the film Barsaat Ki Raat (1960)

== See also ==
- This Is Love (disambiguation)
- Kill This Love, a 2019 EP by Blackpink
- Yeh Jo Mohabbat Hai (lit. 'This Love'), a 2012 Indian romantic drama film
- "Yeh Ishq Hai" (lit. 'Oh This Love'), a song by Pritam and Shreya Ghoshal from the 2007 Indian film Jab We Met
