= Seventeen Ain't Young =

Song by The Archies
- Released: 1968
- Recorded: 1968
- Genre: Bubblegum pop
- Length: 2:19
- Songwriter(s): Jeff Barry

"Seventeen Ain't Young" is a song written by Jeff Barry and recorded by The Archies, a fictional bubblegum pop band from Archie Comics. It was included on the group's self-titled album. It was covered by Frankie Howson with another Archies song, "Hide And Seek", in 1969; the cover version was produced by Stan Rofe and became a Top 40 hit in Melbourne, Australia.
