= Kelly-Lynn =

American Contemporary Christian musician

Kelly-Lynn McVey
- Birth name: Kelly-Lynn Federman
- Also known as: Bath Salt Sunday
- Born: September 28, 1989 (age 35)
- Origin: Coram, New York
- Genres: Christian pop, Classical, Pop
- Occupation(s): Singer, songwriter
- Instrument: singing piano
- Years active: 2002–present

Kelly-Lynn is a vocalist from the United States, who has recorded lead and backing vocals on 3 projects with Walt Disney Records, and also is the voice of Veronica Lodge on the Archies Christmas Album featuring Betty and Veronica released in 2008.

Kelly-Lynn recorded her first song at age 12. Her first song: "I believe," was played on over 60 Christian Radio stations around the country. She has worked with some of the finest musicians from around the world, including Louise Ryan (Charlotte Church's vocal coach), UK composer Paul Weston, guitarist Nigel Jenkins (Gerry Rafferty and Cliff Richard), Ron Dante (The Archies and Barry Manilow), and Ted Perlman (Whitney Houston, Burt Bacharach and Bob Dylan).

Kelly-Lynn was a special musical guest on EWTN, the largest religious media outlet in the world, for their popular series called "Backstage". The show was aired worldwide in 110 different countries, available in 140 million homes. It was also simulcast on EWTN radio worldwide. She has recorded lead vocals on three different projects with Walt Disney Records. Disney Girlz Rock Karaoke CD (2007). Kelly-Lynn is featured on the new Disney DVD/CD package of the classic "101 Dalmatians" (2008) as well as the "Sleeping Beauty and friends" soundtrack. She debuted as Veronica in the all time number one hit music group The Archies for their The Archies Christmas Album featuring Betty and Veronica (2008) on the Fuel 2000 record label and distributed by Universal Music Group.
