= So This Is Love =

So This Is Love may refer to:

== Film ==
- So This Is Love? (film), a 1928 silent film directed by Frank Capra
- So This Is Love (film), a 1953 musical starring Kathryn Grayson

== Music ==
- "So This Is Love" (Cinderella song), from the film Cinderella, 1950
- "So This Is Love" (Mental Cube song), 1991, produced by Future Sound of London
- "So This Is Love?" (song), by Van Halen, 1981
- "So This Is Love", a song by Bobby Taylor & the Vancouvers from Bobby Taylor & the Vancouvers, 1968
- "So This Is Love", a song by the Castells, 1962

== See also ==
- This Is Love (disambiguation)
