= Teja Kalan =

Coordinates: 31°54′N 75°01′E

- Village
- Interactive map of Teja Kalan
- Country: India
- State: Punjab
- District: Gurdaspur
- Tehsil: Batala
- Region: Majha

Government
  - Type: Panchayat raj
  - Body: Gram panchayat

Area
  - Total: 151 ha (370 acres)

Population (2011)
  - Total: 1,206; 635/571 ♂/♀
  - Scheduled Castes: 564; 302/262 ♂/♀
  - Total Households: 220

Languages
  - Official: Punjabi
- Time zone: UTC+5:30 (IST)
- Telephone: 01871
- ISO 3166 code: IN-PB
- Vehicle registration: PB-18
- Website: gurdaspur.nic.in

Teja Kalan is a village in Batala in Gurdaspur district of Punjab State, India. It is located 20 kilometres (12 mi) from sub district headquarter, 50 kilometres (31 mi) from district headquarter and 10 kilometres (6.2 mi) from Sri Hargobindpur. The village is administrated by Sarpanch an elected representative of the village. The current sarpanch is Sardar Palwinder Swarninder Jeet singh ji.

== Demography ==
As of 2011, the village has a total number of 220 houses and a population of 1206 of which 635 are males while 571 are females. According to the report published by Census India in 2011, out of the total population of the village 564 people are from Schedule Caste and the village does not have any Schedule Tribe population so far.

== See also ==
- List of villages in India
