= Is This Love? =

Is This Love may refer to:

- "Is This Love" (Daryl Braithwaite song)
- "Is This Love?" (Clap Your Hands Say Yeah song)
- "Is This Love?" (The Fireman song)
- "Is This Love" (Aiden Grimshaw song)
- "Is This Love" (Bob Marley & The Wailers song)
- "Is This Love?" (Alison Moyet song)
- "Is This Love?" (Bonnie Pink song)
- "Is This Love" (Survivor song)
- "Is This Love" (Whitesnake song)
- "Is This Love" (XG song)
- "Is This Love?", a song by Daði Freyr Pétursson
- "Is This Love", a song by Chris Brown from his 2005 album Chris Brown
- "Is This Love ('09)", a song by Eminem, featuring 50 Cent, from his 2022 album Curtain Call 2
- "Step You/Is This Love?", a 2005 song by Ayumi Hamasaki
- "Is This Love", by James from Yummy, 2024

== See also ==
- Is It Love? (disambiguation)
