= Tejas (musician) =

Indian singer-songwriter

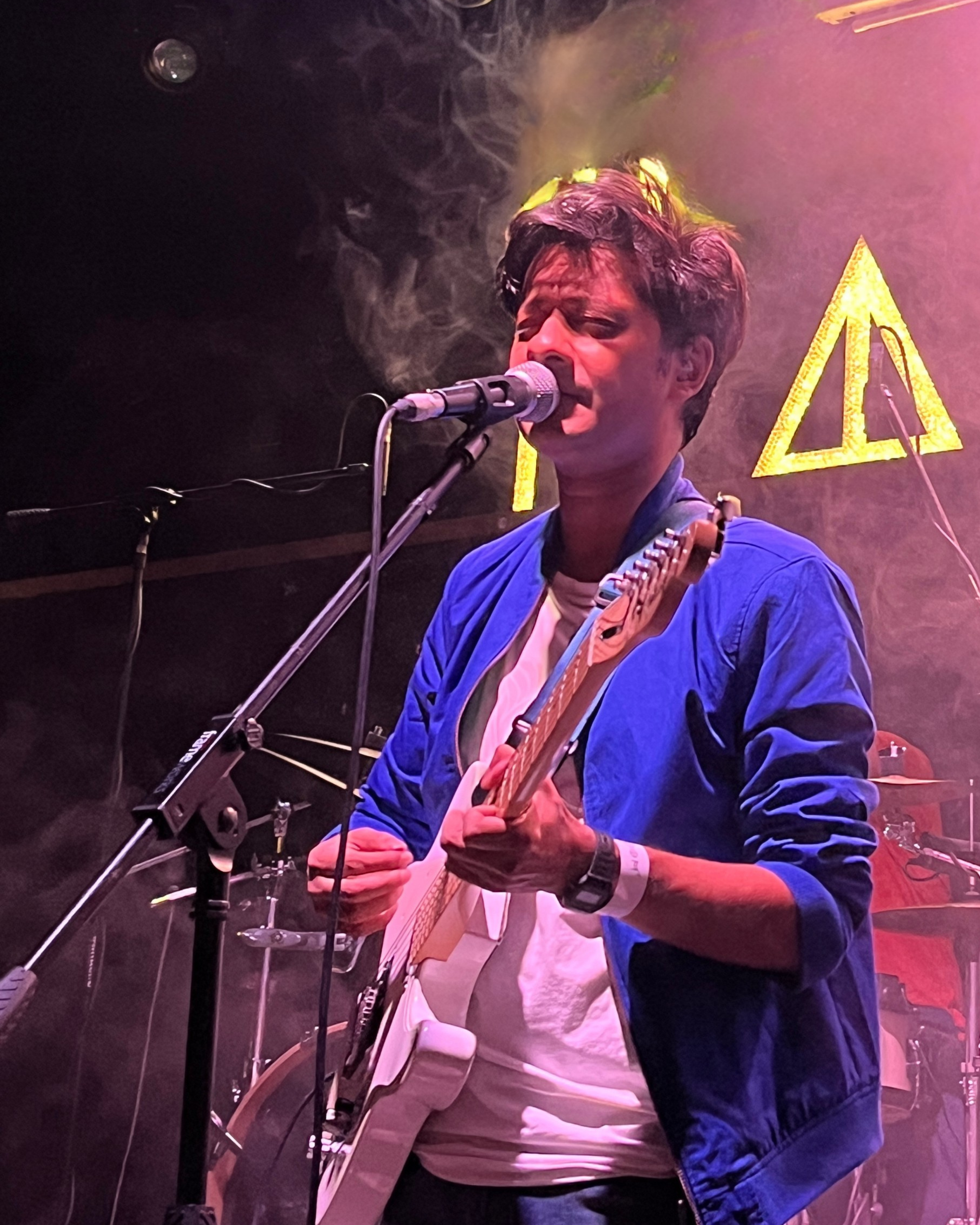
- Tejas performing in 2023

Background information
- Born: Tejas Menon; 1989 (age 36–37); Hyderabad, Andhra Pradesh, India
- Genres: Pop; rock; R&B; electronica; indie
- Occupations: Musician; singer; songwriter
- Instruments: Vocals; Guitar
- Years active: 2011–present
- Label: Independent / self-released
- Member of: Geek Fruit
- Website: www.musicbytejas.com

Tejas Menon, better known by his stage name Tejas, is an Indian singer-songwriter and guitarist from Mumbai, India. He has released two studio albums: Make It Happen (2017) and Outlast (2021). Make It Happen reached No. 1 on the Indian Pop Charts on iTunes upon its release, while Outlast was featured among the top 10 Best Indian albums of 2021 by Rolling Stone magazine. Tejas gained nationwide fame for his contributions to the soundtrack of the Netflix film The Archies (2023) by Zoya Akhtar.

He has performed extensively across the country, headlining sold-out shows at major venues and music festivals, such as Lollapalooza India, NH7 Weekender, Kala Ghoda Arts Festival, and VH1 Supersonic, among others. He has also shared the stage with notable artists like Lucy Rose, Damien Rice, Westlife, and John Mayer, during their India tours.

== Early life ==
Tejas was born in Hyderabad, Andhra Pradesh, India. His father hails from Palakkad, while his mother is from Thalassery. He has one older brother. Following his birth, his family relocated to Dubai, where he spent his formative years. Tejas later moved to India after completing high school, residing with his cousins. He holds a degree in economics from Nowrosjee Wadia College, Pune, and a master's degree in Media and Communication from Symbiosis Institute of Media and Communication, Pune. Apart from his academic pursuits, he joined Radio One at age 19 and worked there for three years, immersing himself in the Indian indie music scene.

During this period, he began writing and composing songs. Influenced by artists such as Gowri Jayakumar, Something Relevant, Them Clones, Indus Creed, and Blackstratblues, who were independently releasing music, along with the emergence of the NH7 Weekender music festival in Pune, Tejas ventured into showcasing his own music online and performing live shows around Pune.

== Career ==
=== Early career: Small Victories and Make It Happen (2013–2019) ===
After completing his master's degree, Tejas made the decision leave Pune for Mumbai. The initial days were a struggle for him in Mumbai, and that's where he started to write his first EP, titled Small Victories, which was released in 2014. His then-manager, Krish Makhija, made videos of Tejas, which brought him fame and later secured him shows such as Ragasthan Music Festival, the Vans New Wave Festival, Kala Ghoda Arts Festival, and Escape Festival Ladakh.

He also founded and runs Geek Fruit in 2015, which is a podcast and community for Indian pop-culture geeks and enthusiasts. It now has over 300 episodes and is one of the first-ever pop-culture podcasts to come from India. He now performs at Comic Con across India and hosts events such as Super Scary Awesome, their annual Halloween Party, along with co-founders Jishnu Guha and Dinkar Dwivedi.

Tejas released his first studio album, Make It Happen, in 2017, which went to No. 1 on the Indian Pop Charts on iTunes upon its release.

=== Outlast (2020–2022) ===
During the COVID-19 pandemic in 2020, Tejas released three singles, namely "Lead", "The Mumbai Doors", and a remastered version of "Ruby". "Ruby" is a song from Small Victories, while "Lead" and "The Mumbai Doors" were collectively released in Tejas's second album, Outlast, which was released in 2021. Longtime bandmates Jehangir Jehangir and Adil Kurwa worked alongside Tejas for the album at Island City Studios, Mumbai. Even before the pandemic hit, Tejas had been active on social media, spreading his music. Along with Dinkar Dwivedi, he released a 12-minute YouTube video named "Conference Call: The Musicall!", a parody-drama video on YouTube that stresses the corporate world and the online work-from-home system.

=== The Archies (2023–present) ===
Tejas released the single "Some Kind of Nothing" in 2023. Along with that, Tejas performed at the debut edition of Lollapalooza India and embarked on an India tour in 2023. One major highlight of the year was his contribution to The Archies, a 2023 teen musical-comedy film directed by Zoya Akhtar, which garnered immense popularity among audiences. The film features a soundtrack composed by the Indian music trio Shankar–Ehsaan–Loy, Ankur Tewari, The Islanders, and Aditi "Dot" Saigal. Tejas's contributions included singing on most of the tracks in the movie.

== Musical style and influences ==
Tejas's lyrics are inspired by events from his own life and stories from his journey to find his identity. Though he admits that he started off by writing about love and girls, he seems to have found his true spirit in writing about things that are deeply rooted in his own experiences. His unique music and sounds have blended several genres into his own signature brand of pop.

Tejas considers KT Tunstall and Sara Bareilles as his influences in writing songs. He also cites John Mayer, The Police, Matchbox Twenty, Michael Jackson, Blackstratblues, and others as his inspirations. Apart from this, Tejas takes great influence from science fiction, adventure books, films, and musical theater.

== Band members ==
Current members

- Tejas – lead vocals and guitars (2011–present)
- Adil Kurwa – backing vocals and bass (2014–present)
- Jehangir Jehangir – drums (2014–present)

Other touring musicians

- Rohan Rajadhyaksha – keyboards and synthesizer (2018–present)
- Mallika Barot – vocals (2019–present)
- Aria Nanji – vocals, guitar and mandolin (2022–present)
- Sharad Rao – guitar and backing vocals (2022–present)

== Discography ==
Studio albums

- Outlast (2021)
- Make It Happen (2017)

EPs

- Small Victories (2014)

Singles

- "What Comes After" (2025)
- "Va Va Voom" (from The Archies, 2023)
- "Sunoh" (from The Archies, 2023)
- I"f I Could Fly" (2023)
- "Some Kind of Nothing" (2023)
- "As I'm Getting Older" (2022)
- "Down and Out" (2021)
- "Ruby" (Remastered) (2020)
- "The Mumbai Doors" (2020)
- "Lead" (2020)
- "River" (2019)
- "Make It Happen" (2017)
- "Evidence" (2015)
