= Ragasthan =

Music festival in Rajasthan, India

Ragasthan is a three-day desert camping music festival held in November in Rajasthan, India. The festival provides an experience of camping in the deserts of Jaisalmer, combined with multiple genres of music played on four stages, film, art, photography and various outdoor activities such as paintball, sand-surfing and zorbing. Music on the four main stages runs concurrently: the Morio stage features pop, rock and alternative rock acts; the Ammara stage features electronic and dubstep music; the Olun stage features world music, fusion, folk and classical musicians; and the Open Mic stage features singer-songwriter bands and artists.

== History ==
Festival founder Keith Menon first proposed the idea for a desert festival in 2008. Planning took time, and the first Ragasthan Festival took place from November 16 to 18, 2012 at the Kanoi Dunes near the outskirts of the city of Jaisalmer Patrons were brought to the festival site on Ragasthan festival buses and invited to set up their own stalls at the nomad market, create art installations and jam with attending artists by campfires. Patrons stayed at the venue in Swiss Tents or set up tents they brought themselves. Single day passes were also available. In 2012, Ragasthan was attended by about 6,000 fans over three days.

Ragasthan 2012 featured four music stages, one workshop zone, two film zones (tented and open air) featuring selections from the Sci-Fi Film Festival (UK), one adventure sports area, one flea-market zone, tented restaurants and bars, art installations and two camping zones (Swiss Tents and BYOT – Bring Your Own Tent). Activities like giant kite-flying, RC Plane flying, Turban-tying contests, sky-lanterns, etc. were held through the three days.

Camel rides, camel carts and tractors were used as modes of transport within the festival premises. Drinking water and tea were provided for free to all patrons. In 2012 the festival was listed among the top ten music festivals in India by Radio and Music magazine. The artist lineup featured more than 30 artist spread across various genres of music and varied nationalities. Visual artist Viktor Furiani and his team, Mosquito Masala performed video-mapped live projections at the Morio and Ammara stages for the three nights.

Because of a change in the timing of the festival from November to February, there was no 2013 festival. In 2014 the festival included a variety of art installations. That year, the band Kabir Cafe played at the festival, as well as pianist Christophe Chassol.
