= The Archies (soundtrack) =

2023 film soundtrack album

Soundtrack album by Shankar–Ehsaan–Loy, Ankur Tewari, The Islanders and Aditi "Dot" Saigal
- Released: 25 November 2023
- Recorded: 2022–2023
- Genre: Feature film soundtrack
- Length: 37:58
- Languages: Hindi, English
- Label: Sony Music India

Singles from The Archies
- 1. "Sunoh" Released: 19 October 2023; 2. "Va Va Voom" Released: 2 November 2023; 3. "In Raahon Mein" Released: 14 November 2023

The Archies (Soundtrack from the Netflix Film) is the soundtrack to the 2023 teen musical comedy film The Archies directed by Zoya Akhtar. The soundtrack consisted of 16 songs composed by Shankar–Ehsaan–Loy, Ankur Tewari, The Islanders and Aditi "Dot" Saigal, with lyrics written by Javed Akhtar, Zoya, Shibani Akhtar, Tewari and Saigal. It was released by Sony Music India on 25 November 2023.

== Development ==
In July 2022, an article from India Today reported that the film would feature 11 songs. Shankar–Ehsaan–Loy who composed for Zoya's Luck by Chance (2009), Zindagi Na Milegi Dobara (2011) and Dil Dhadakne Do (2015) had composed most of the songs, either primarily or with Ankur Tewari, previously worked with Zoya in Gully Boy (2019), and Aditi "Dot" Saigal, who also starred in the film as Ethel Muggs. The Islanders also made their mainstream film music debut with this film, composing three of the songs with Tewari. Javed Akhtar was the primary lyricist, penning down most of the songs.

The trio stated that bringing 1960s music comes very naturally, describing it as an organic process and also interacted with Anglo-Indians for the authenticity. He cited "Va Va Voom" came out organically as Ehsaan had randomly played one line and they decided to record the track, they felt the song would fit the sequence as it had an element of rock. For the recording, he had sampled jamming of a drum loop, riffs, melodies and then record it in the studio live. He followed a band-like approach, that consisted of instruments such as guitar, bass, drums and piano or organ to sonically imprint the 1960s.

Ankur Tewari was brought early in the music production and songwriting process, where they collaboratively write dummy lyrics before presenting it to Javed and have his ideas implemented into the lyrics. As the songs were mostly controversial, Javed had to forget 85 percent of the vocabulary he used as the kids were Anglo-Indians and they have limited vocabulary. Hence, he could not write intricate poetry, but simple words that conveyed the message either being about politics or love, it had to be musical and the rhymes needed to fit the tune.

The album prominently features young singers, with few cast members: Saigal and Vedang Raina already had a musical background. The song "Jab Tum Na Theen" marked Suhana Khan's playback singing debut. Speaking of it, the trio wanted someone who had the required voice, age and innocence. As previous singers whom they collaborated with sounded too professional, the team wanted Khan to record the track which managed their expectations. Albeit being nervous, she practiced a lot before recording, as the song had a conversational quality. Tejas had primarily sung most of the tracks, for whom the trio hailed it as "fantastic" and being "out of his territory" that they wanted because of the casting and setting. Tejas trained on the language, that had to be true to the character, but not to be anglicized, where "the Hindi should be correct, but at the same time you know that he is from that style of speaking and living, the Anglo Indian 1960s family".

== Release ==
The soundtrack was preceded with the first single "Sunoh". It was released on 19 October 2023, in conjunction with the promotional event held at Bollywood Hungama OTT Fest with the cast being present. A portion of the song was performed by the cast at the Tudum 2023 event held in São Paulo, Brazil. It is a "friendship anthem" as described by NDTV, that introduces a glimpse of the characters' lives in the fictional Riverdale. The second song "Va Va Voom" was released on 2 November 2023. The third song "In Raahon Mein" was performed by Arijit Singh at a concert held in Azerbaijan on 12 November, before its official release on 14 November 2023. The fourth song "Dishoom Dishoom" was released, along with the soundtrack, on 25 November 2023. The release coincided with the music launch event held at Film City, Mumbai with the presence of the cast and the music team.

== Track listing ==
The Archies (Soundtrack from the Netflix Film)
No.	Title	Lyrics	Music	Singer(s)	Length
1.	"Sunoh"	Javed Akhtar, Aditi "Dot" Saigal	Ankur Tewari, The Islanders	Tejas, Shivam Mahadevan, Aditi "Dot" Saigal	3:06
2.	"Va Va Voom"	Javed Akhtar	Shankar–Ehsaan–Loy	Tejas, Chelsea Das, Kiara Alemao, Zoe Siddharth, Aryaman Singh, Brendan Alphonso, Urgen Yolmo, Shaurya Singh, Simran Duggal, Kenishaa Francis, Shane D'Souza	2:08
3.	"In Raahon Mein"	Javed Akhtar	Shankar–Ehsaan–Loy	Arijit Singh	3:03
4.	"Dhishoom Dhishoom"	Javed Akhtar	Shankar–Ehsaan–Loy	Aditi "Dot" Saigal, Kelly Dlima	2:01
5.	"Plum Pudding"	Shibani Akhtar, Zoya Akhtar	Ankur Tewari, Shankar–Ehsaan–Loy	Ankur Tewari, Shibani Akhtar, Zoya Akhtar	3:03
6.	"Asymmetrical"	Aditi "Dot" Saigal	Aditi "Dot" Saigal	Aditi "Dot" Saigal, Tejas	2:33
7.	"Jab Tum Na Theen"	Javed Akhtar, Aditi "Dot" Saigal	Shankar–Ehsaan–Loy, Aditi "Dot" Saigal	Suhana Khan, Aditi "Dot" Saigal, Tejas	2:43
8.	"Chhoona Aasmaan"	Ankur Tewari	Ankur Tewari, The Islanders	Ankur Tewari	3:00
9.	"Everything Is Politics"	Javed Akhtar, Aditi "Dot" Saigal	Shankar–Ehsaan–Loy, Aditi "Dot" Saigal	Arish B, Aditi "Dot" Saigal, Tejas, Shivam Mahadevan, Vedang Raina	3:03
10.	"Yeh Saari Aawazein"	Javed Akhtar	Shankar–Ehsaan–Loy	Tejas	4:10
11.	"Lonely July"	Ankur Tewari	Ankur Tewari, The Islanders	Ankur Tewari, The Islanders	2:21
12.	"Dear Diary" (June)	Aditi "Dot" Saigal	Aditi "Dot" Saigal	Aditi "Dot" Saigal	0:41
13.	"Dear Diary" (July)	Aditi "Dot" Saigal	Aditi "Dot" Saigal	Aditi "Dot" Saigal	0:52
14.	"Dear Diary" (September)	Aditi "Dot" Saigal	Aditi "Dot" Saigal	Aditi "Dot" Saigal	1:10
15.	"Dear Diary" (October)	Aditi "Dot" Saigal	Aditi "Dot" Saigal	Aditi "Dot" Saigal	0:49
16.	"Sunoh" (Reprise)	Javed Akhtar, Aditi "Dot" Saigal	Ankur Tewari, The Islanders	Aditi "Dot" Saigal, Shillong Chamber Choir	3:07
Total length:					37:58

== Reception ==
Prachi Arya of India Today, regarding "Va Va Voom", said that "the peppy dance number celebrates the timeless rock and roll tunes". Apeksha Juneja of Pinkvilla called it as "a delightful throwback to the '60s rock and roll era, offering a fun and retro dance spectacle". Filmfare described "In Raahon Mein" as a "perfect road trip song" with the lyrics "are all about the journey of life that keeps going on. The soft melody seems like the backdrop of a summer trip."

A critic from NDTV described "Dishoom Dishoom" as a "roller-skating extravaganza". Lalitha Suhasini of Film Companion described "Sunoh" as a keyed-up version of "Rockin' Around the Christmas Tree" from the cast of Glee (2009–2015). She further wrote "it's hard to shake off the sense that there is something familiar and yet, foreign about the track. Familiar if you went to a Christian school where hymns and carols are part of your vocal repertoire (whether you can hold a note or not) and foreign because you haven't heard this sound in a Bollywood film."
