= Teas =

Teas or TEAS can mean:

- Tea, a traditional beverage made from steeping the processed leaves, buds, or twigs of the tea bush (Camellia sinensis) in water.
- Test of Essential Academic Skills, a standardized aptitude test used for entrance to nursing schools
- Thermal energy atom scattering, a physics technique, see Helium atom scattering
- Trademark Electronic Application System at United States Patent and Trademark Office
- The Eric Andre Show, an Adult Swim television series
- The European Azerbaijan Society
