= Veela Teja =

- Village
- Country: India
- State: Punjab
- District: Gurdaspur
- Tehsil: Batala
- Region: Majha

Government
  - Type: Punjab govt Panchayat raj

Area
  - Total: 997 ha (2,460 acres)

Population (2011)
  - Total: 4,435; 2,329/2,106 ♂/♀
  - Ger. SC BC: 1,028; 543/485 ♂/♀
  - Total Households: 840

Language punjabi
  - Official: Punjabi
- Time zone: UTC+5:30 (IST)
- Postal code: 143513
- Telephone: 01871
- ISO 3166 code: IN-PB
- Vehicle registration: List of RTO districts in India#PB—Punjab, PB18, PB06
- Website: gurdaspur.nic.in

Veela Teja is a village in Batala in Gurdaspur district of Punjab State, India. It is located 25 kilometres (16 mi) from sub district headquarter, 60 kilometres (37 mi) from district headquarter and 34 kilometres (21 mi) from Amritsar. The village is administrated by Sarpanch, an elected representative of the village.The village is administered by a Sarpanch, an elected representative of the village. Mr. Wassan Singh Randhawa, son of Sardar Karnial Singh Shah, served as the long-term Sarpanch of this village. Mr. Wassan Singh also became the chairman of the Punjab Mandi Board and other government official agencies. As chairman, Mr. Singh’s sole aim was to serve humanity and the poor. In 1997, he passed away due to a long-term medical condition. Everyone in the two districts of Amritsar and Gurdaspur remembers Mr. Singh. He actively participated in the Akali Dal Jail Roko and other movements to serve the Sikh community and humanity He actively participated in the Akali Dal Jail Roko and other movements to serve the Sikh community and humanity. His family members, including his father and grandfather, are considered among the richest people.

== Demography ==
As of 2011, the village has a total number of 840 houses and a population of 4,435 of which 2,329 are males while 2,106 are females. According to the report published by Census India in 2011, out of the total population of the village 1,028 people are from Schedule Caste and the village does not have any Schedule Tribe population so far.

== Education ==
The list of major educational institutions in Veela Teja is given below.

- Mata Gujri Public School
- Baba Deep Singh Public School
- Government Primary School, Veela Teja

== See also ==
- List of villages in India
