= Everything's Archie (album) =

Studio album by The Archies
- Released: 1969
- Recorded: 1968–1969
- Genre: Bubblegum pop
- Length: 30:01
- Label: Calendar
- Producer: Jeff Barry

The Archies chronology
The Archies (1968)	Everything's Archie (1969)	Jingle Jangle (1969)

Singles from Everything's Archie
- 1. "Feelin' So Good (S.K.O.O.B.Y.-D.O.O.)" Released: December 14, 1968; 2. "Sugar, Sugar" Released: May 24, 1969

Everything's Archie is the second studio album by The Archies, a fictional bubblegum pop band from Archie Comics. It was produced by Jeff Barry and released on the Calendar Records label in 1969.

== Commercial performance ==
The album's first single, "Feelin' So Good (S.K.O.O.B.Y.-D.O.O.)", peaked at No. 53 on the Billboard Hot 100 chart. The album's second single, "Sugar, Sugar", peaked at No. 1 on the pop chart, selling over six million copies and being awarded a golden disc; it was ranked as the number one song of the year in 1969, according to Billboard. The album peaked at No. 66 on the Billboard 200 chart. As of September 1969, the album sold over 700,000 copies.

== Track listing ==
Side 1
No.	Title	Writer(s)	Length
1.	"Feelin' So Good (S.K.O.O.B.Y.-D.O.O.)"	Jeff Barry; Andy Kim	2:56
2.	"Melody Hill"	Mark Barkan; Ritchie Adams	2:27
3.	"Rock & Roll Music"	Barry	2:34
4.	"Kissin'"	Barkan; Adams	2:27
5.	"Don't Touch My Guitar"	Barry	2:16
6.	"Circle of Blue"	Barkan; Adams	2:17

Side 2
No.	Title	Writer(s)	Length
1.	"Sugar, Sugar"	Barry; Kim	2:48
2.	"You Little Angel, You"	Barry	2:39
3.	"Bicycles, Roller Skates and You"	Barkan; Adams	2:34
4.	"Hot Dog"	Barkan; Adams	2:19
5.	"Inside Out - Upside Down"	Barry; Kim	2:14
6.	"Love Light"	Barry	2:30

== Personnel ==
- Ron Dante – vocals
- Toni Wine – backing vocals
- Andy Kim – backing vocals

== Charts ==
Chart (1969)	Peak position
US Billboard Top LPs	66
