= Sunshine (The Archies album) =

Studio album by The Archies
- Released: 1970
- Recorded: 1970
- Genre: Bubblegum pop
- Length: 29:48
- Label: Kirshner
- Producer: Jeff Barry

The Archies chronology
Jingle Jangle (1969)	Sunshine (1970)	The Archies Greatest Hits (1970)

Singles from Sunshine
- 1. "Sunshine" Released: June 20, 1970; 2. "A Summer Prayer for Peace" Released: July 1971

Sunshine is the fourth studio album by The Archies, a fictional bubblegum pop band from Archie Comics. It was released on the Kirshner Records label in 1970. All tracks were produced by Jeff Barry, with the exception of four songs ("Mr. Factory", "Dance", "Comes The Sun" and "One Big Family"), which were written and produced by Neil Brian Goldberg; they were mistakenly credited to Barry, as Goldberg was a staff writer working under Barry's supervision at the time. The album's first single, "Sunshine", peaked at No. 57 on the Billboard Hot 100 chart. The album's second single, "A Summer Prayer For Peace", was only released overseas and topped the charts in South Africa. The album peaked at No. 137 on the Billboard Top LPs chart.

== Track listing ==
Side 1
No.	Title	Writer(s)	Length
1.	"Sunshine"	Jeff Barry; Bobby Bloom	3:16
2.	"Who's Gonna Love Me"	Barry; Ron Dante; Gene Allen	1:49
3.	"Mr. Factory"	Neil Brian Goldberg; Barry	2:33
4.	"Love and Rock 'n Roll Music"	Barry; Dante; Allen	2:18
5.	"Over and Over"	Barry; Dante	2:21
6.	"Waldo P. Emerson Jones"	Barry; Andy Kim	2:42

Side 2
No.	Title	Writer(s)	Length
7.	"A Summer Prayer for Peace"	Barry	2:50
8.	"Dance"	Goldberg; Barry	2:20
9.	"Comes the Sun"	Goldberg; Barry	2:23
10.	"Suddenly Susan"	Barry; Dante; Allen	2:16
11.	"One Big Family"	Goldberg; Barry	1:53
12.	"It's the Summertime"	Barry; Kim	2:48

== Charts ==
Chart (1970)	Peak position
US Billboard Top LPs	137
