= Teja Khurd =

Coordinates: 31°53′N 75°01′E

- Village
- Interactive map of Teja Khurd
- Country: India
- State: Punjab
- District: Gurdaspur
- Tehsil: Batala
- Region: Majha

Government
  - Type: Panchayat raj
  - Body: Gram panchayat

Area
  - Total: 189 ha (470 acres)

Population (2011)
  - Total: 550; 286/264 ♂/♀
  - Scheduled Castes: 123; 66/57 ♂/♀
  - Total Households: 116

Languages
  - Official: Punjabi
- Time zone: UTC+5:30 (IST)
- Telephone: 01871
- ISO 3166 code: IN-PB
- Vehicle registration: PB-18
- Website: gurdaspur.nic.in

Teja Khurd is a village in Batala in Gurdaspur district of Punjab State, India. It is located 20 kilometres (12 mi) from sub district headquarter, 50 kilometres (31 mi) from district headquarter and 10 kilometres (6.2 mi) from Sri Hargobindpur. The village is administrated by Sarpanch an elected representative of the village.

== Demography ==
As of 2011, the village has a total number of 116 houses and a population of 550 of which 286 are males while 264 are females. According to the report published by Census India in 2011, out of the total population of the village 123 people are from Schedule Caste and the village does not have any Schedule Tribe population so far.

== See also ==
- List of villages in India
