= Jingle Jangle (The Archies album) =

Studio album by The Archies
- Released: 1969
- Recorded: 1969
- Genre: Bubblegum pop
- Length: 28:21
- Label: Kirshner
- Producer: Jeff Barry

The Archies chronology
Everything's Archie (1969)	Jingle Jangle (1969)	Sunshine (1970)

Singles from Jingle Jangle
- 1. "Jingle Jangle" Released: November 1969

Jingle Jangle is the third studio album by The Archies, a fictional bubblegum pop band from Archie Comics. It was produced by Jeff Barry and released on the Kirshner Records label in 1969. The album includes the hit single "Jingle Jangle", which peaked at No. 10 on the Billboard Hot 100 chart. The album peaked at No. 125 on the Billboard Top LPs chart.

== Track listing ==
Side 1
No.	Title	Writer(s)	Length
1.	"Jingle Jangle"	Jeff Barry; Andy Kim	2:47
2.	"Everything's Alright"	Ron Dante	2:17
3.	"She's Putting Me Thru Changes"	Dante; Kim Milford	2:17
4.	"Justine"	Barry	2:17
5.	"Whoopee Tie Ai A"	Barry	2:15
6.	"Nursery Rhyme"	Barry; Kim	2:32

Side 2
No.	Title	Writer(s)	Length
7.	"Get on the Line"	Barry; Kim	2:33
8.	"You Know I Love You"	Barry; Kim	2:14
9.	"Senorita Rita"	Barry	2:30
10.	"Look Before You Leap"	Dante; Gene Allen	2:15
11.	"Sugar and Spice"	Dante; Allen	2:04
12.	"Archie's Party"	Barry	2:12

== Charts ==
Chart (1969)	Peak position
US Billboard Top LPs	125
