= This Is Love (The Archies album) =

This is Love

Studio album by The Archies
- Released: 1971
- Genre: Pop, bubblegum pop
- Length: 31:25
- Label: Kirshner
- Producer: Ritchie Adams & Ron Dante

The Archies chronology
The Archies Greatest Hits (1970)	This is Love (1971)	The Archies (1977)

Singles from This Is Love
- 1. "Together We Two" Released: December 21, 1970; 2. "This is Love" Released: 1971

This is Love is the fifth and final studio album released by The Archies, a fictional bubblegum pop band of The Archie Show and the Archie Comics universe. The album includes 12 tracks and was issued on Kirshner Records.

This is Love was a departure for the group in several ways, starting with the choice of producers. Jeff Barry had produced all previous Archies albums. However, except for the lead single, "Together We Two"—which was produced by Barry and co-written by Barry and Andy Kim, who had written the group's biggest hit, 1969's "Sugar, Sugar.")—the album was produced by lead singer Ron Dante and Ritchie Adams, perhaps best known for co-writing with Mark Barkan "The Tra La La Song (One Banana, Two Banana)", a hit for the Banana Splits in 1969. Adams co-wrote eight of the twelve songs on the album, collaborating on two with Barkan; Dante co-wrote three more. Another departure was that, as critic Greg Ehrbar wrote in 2020, "Unlike the four previous Archies LP's, it was visually and audibly marketed to females ... This is Love, festooned with fresh gardenias and pencil sketches of romantic teen activities, was destined for the Barbie aisle of the store."

Perhaps the most significant departure was that, unlike the earlier Archies albums, no tracks from This is Love were featured on any of the Saturday morning cartoon shows produced by Filmation. As a result, the designated single from the album, "Together We Two," failed to chart, bringing the Archies' run of hit singles to an end.

Billboard lauded the album on its initial release, citing "good solid rhythm performances." In the years since, however, critical opinion has been divided on its merits. Writing in Allmusic, Stewart Mason concluded, "The last of the original Archies albums, 1971's This Is Love is the weakest of the lot." In the 2001 anthology Bubblegum Music is the Naked Truth, David Smay describes it as "a labored and self-conscious effort, lacking the effervescent charm of its predecessors. The Barkan-Adams songs try too hard to whip up some kinderpop vibe and miss the distracted artistry of the Barry-Kim songs." On the positive side, writer Jeff Clark calls This is Love "a great record," comparing it to the Beach Boys classic Pet Sounds. Ron Dante told Clark, "This is Love is one of my favorite albums. It's a little more sophisticated but it has really cool songs."

== Track listing ==
No.	Title	Writer(s)	Length
1.	"This Is Love"	Ritchie Adams, Robert Levine	2:35
2.	"Don't Need No Bad Girl"	Ritchie Adams, Allen Gordon	2:22
3.	"Should Anybody Ask"	Ritchie Adams, Robert Levine	2:03
4.	"Easy Guy"	Ritchie Adams, Robert Levine	2:38
5.	"Maybe I'm Wrong"	Ritchie Adams	2:06
6.	"What Goes On"	Ritchie Adams, Allen Gordon	3:53
7.	"Carousel Man"	Ron Dante, Bob Gengo	2:22
8.	"Hold on to Lovin'"	Ron Dante, Gene Allan	2:32
9.	"This Is the Night"	Ritchie Adams, Mark Barkan	3:01
10.	"Little Green Jacket"	Ritchie Adams, Mark Barkan	2:45
11.	"Together We Two"	Jeff Barry, Andy Kim	2:35
12.	"Throw a Little Love My Way"	Ron Dante, Gene Allan	2:33
Total length:			31:25
