= Jingle Jangle (The Archies song) =

Single by The Archies

from the album Jingle Jangle
- B-side: "Justine"
- Released: November 1969
- Genre: Bubblegum pop
- Length: 2:47
- Label: Kirshner
- Songwriters: Jeff Barry; Andy Kim
- Producer: Jeff Barry

The Archies singles chronology
"Sugar, Sugar" (1969)	"Jingle Jangle" (1969)	"Who's Your Baby?" (1970)

"Jingle Jangle" is a song written by Jeff Barry and Andy Kim, produced by Barry and recorded by The Archies, a fictional bubblegum pop band from Archie Comics. It was released as the group's fourth single on the Kirshner Records label in November 1969, and included on their third album, Jingle Jangle. It reached number 10 on the Billboard Hot 100 and number 27 on the U.S. Easy Listening chart in 1969. In January 1970, it went to number 1 for one week in Canada.

== Chart performance ==
Chart (1969–1970)	Peak position
Canada RPM Top Singles	1
New Zealand (Listener)	10
South Africa (Springbok)	15
US Billboard Hot 100	10
US Billboard Easy Listening	37

== Certifications ==
Region	Certification	Certified units/sales
United States (RIAA)	Gold	1,000,000^{^}
^{^} Shipments figures based on certification alone.

== Popular culture ==
- In the television show Riverdale, based on the Archie comics, Jingle-Jangle is introduced as a potent recreational drug. The Archies' version of the song is briefly heard in the episode "Chapter Thirty-Eight: As Above, So Below".
