= The Archies (album) =

Studio album by The Archies
- Released: 1968
- Recorded: 1968
- Genre: Bubblegum pop
- Length: 28:28
- Label: Calendar
- Producer: Jeff Barry

The Archies chronology
The Archies (1968)	Everything's Archie (1969)

Singles from The Archies
- 1. "Bang-Shang-A-Lang" Released: August 31, 1968

Professional ratings
Review scores
Source	Rating
Allmusic	2.5/5 stars

The Archies is the debut studio album by The Archies, a fictional bubblegum pop band from Archie Comics. It was produced by Jeff Barry, co-produced by Don Kirshner and released on the Calendar Records label in 1968. The album includes the band's debut single, "Bang-Shang-A-Lang", which peaked at No. 22 on the Billboard Hot 100 chart. The song "Seventeen Ain't Young" became a Top 40 hit in Australia for Frank Howson. The album peaked at No. 88 on the Billboard 200 chart.

== Track listing ==
Side 1
No.	Title	Writer(s)	Length
1.	"Archie's Theme (Everything's Archie)"	Jeff Barry	1:31
2.	"Boys and Girls"	Barry	2:14
3.	"Time for Love"	Ritchie Adams; Mark Barkan	2:22
4.	"You Make Me Wanna Dance"	Barry	2:22
5.	"La Dee Doo Down Down"	Barry	2:12
6.	"Truck Driver"	Barry	2:54

Side 2
No.	Title	Writer(s)	Length
7.	"Catchin' Up on Fun"	Adams; Barkan	2:18
8.	"I'm in Love"	Barry	2:24
9.	"Seventeen Ain't Young"	Barry	2:19
10.	"Ride, Ride, Ride"	Barry	2:13
11.	"Hide and Seek"	Adams; Barkan	2:30
12.	"Bang-Shang-A-Lang"	Barry	2:34

== Personnel ==
- Ron Dante – vocals
- Gary Chester – drums
- Dave Appell – guitars
- Joey Macho – bass guitar
- Ron Frangipane – keyboards

== Charts ==
Album

Year	Chart	Peak Position
1968	Billboard Top LPs	88

Singles

Year	Single	Chart	Peak Position
1968	"Bang-Shang-A-Lang"	Billboard Hot 100	22
