= Bang-Shang-A-Lang =

Single by The Archies

from the album The Archies
- B-side: "Truck Driver"
- Released: August 31, 1968
- Recorded: 1968
- Genre: Bubblegum pop
- Length: 2:34
- Label: Calendar
- Songwriter: Jeff Barry
- Producer: Jeff Barry

The Archies singles chronology
"Bang-Shang-A-Lang" (1968)	"Feelin' So Good (S.K.O.O.B.Y.-D.O.O.)" (1968)

"Bang-Shang-A-Lang" is a song written and produced by Jeff Barry, and recorded by The Archies, a fictional bubblegum pop band from Archie Comics. It was released as the group's debut single on the Calendar Records label on August 31, 1968, and included on their self-titled album. It peaked at No. 22 on the Billboard Hot 100 chart.

== Charts ==
Chart (1968)	Peak position
Australia Go-Set	15
Canada RPM Top Singles	11
U.S. Billboard Hot 100	22
U.S. Cash Box Top 100	9
South Africa (Springbok Radio SA Top 20)	3

== Other versions ==
- Young Blood released a version of the song as a single in 1968.
- Helen Gamboa released a version of the song as a single in 1968.
- Carmen Villani released an Italian version of the song as a single in 1969 entitled "Dang Dang Dang".
- The Walkers released a version of the song as a single in 1970 in Denmark.
