= Sugar, Sugar =

1969 single by the Archies

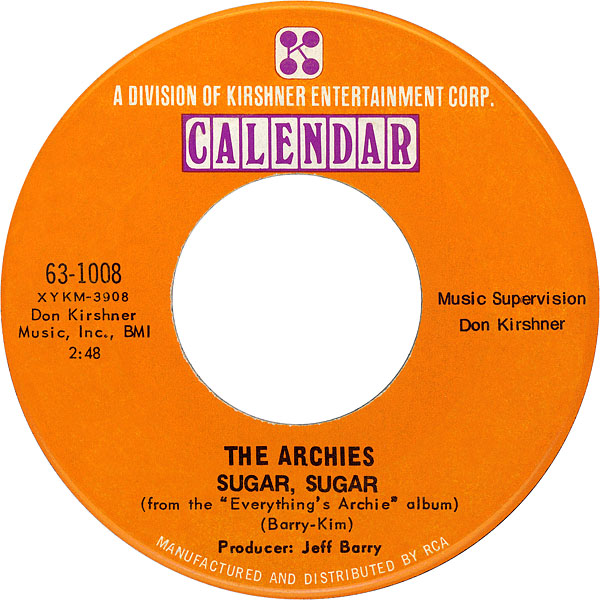
- A-side label of original 1969 US vinyl release

Single by the Archies

from the album Everything's Archie
- B-side: "Melody Hill"
- Released: May 24, 1969
- Genre: Bubblegum pop
- Length: 2:48
- Label: Calendar/Kirshner
- Songwriters: Jeff Barry; Andy Kim
- Producer: Jeff Barry

The Archies singles chronology
"Feelin' So Good (S.K.O.O.B.Y.-D.O.O.)" (1968)	"Sugar, Sugar" (1969)	"Jingle Jangle" (1969)

Music video
- "Sugar, Sugar" on YouTube

"Sugar, Sugar" is a song written by Jeff Barry and Andy Kim, produced by Barry and recorded by The Archies, a fictional bubblegum pop band from Archie Comics. It was released as the group's third single on the Calendar Records label on May 24, 1969, rereleased on the Kirshner Records label in July 1969, and included on their second album, Everything's Archie. In late 1969, it topped both Billboard's Hot 100 (for four weeks) and the UK Singles Chart (for eight weeks), ranking number one for the year in both America and the UK. It is the most successful bubblegum pop single of all time, and is widely regarded as the epitome of the bubblegum music genre.

== History ==
Produced by one of the co-writers, Jeff Barry, "Sugar, Sugar" features a group of studio musicians managed by Don Kirshner, former music supervisor to the Monkees. It was written in the key of D major. Ron Dante provided the lead vocals, accompanied by Toni Wine and the other co-writer, Andy Kim. Together, they provided the voices of the Archies using multitracking. The single was initially released in late May 1969 on Kirshner's Calendar label (as with the group's two previous singles, "Bang-Shang-A-Lang" and "Feelin' So Good (S.K.O.O.B.Y.-D.O.O.)"), achieving moderate success in the middle of the year in several radio markets. When re-released in mid-July 1969 (with pressings also on the Kirshner label), it attained enormous success nationwide across several months.

Upon the song's initial release, Kirshner had promotion men play it for radio station personnel without revealing the group's name, as their previous single, "Feelin' So Good (S.K.O.O.B.Y.-D.O.O.)", had peaked at No. 53 on the Billboard Hot 100 chart. In an article published in The Washington Times, Dante recounts that the label was removed from the record. It was taken to a top radio station, 1260 KYA in San Francisco, where the program director was told: "Just play it! It's a mystery group."

The song was among the selections that astronaut Alan Bean chose when allowed to bring an audio cassette of music to listen to during the Apollo 12 mission in November 1969. According to historian Andrew Chaikin, "When it came on during the trip out from earth, the three of them [Bean, Pete Conrad, and Dick Gordon] would hold onto the struts in the command module and bounce weightlessly to the beat, dancing their way to the moon."

== Chart performance ==
In the issue of Billboard magazine dated September 20, the single started a four-week run at number one on the Hot 100, replacing the Rolling Stones' "Honky Tonk Women". It spent a then-lengthy 22 weeks on the Hot 100 (longer than any other single in 1969), and was one of only ten singles to spend 12 weeks in the Top Ten during the decade. It topped Billboard's year-end list of the Top Hot 100 Singles of 1969. In August 1969 the record was certified gold by the RIAA for sales of one million. (In 1989 the gold threshold was lowered to 500,000.) In 2018 "Sugar, Sugar" ranked 81 in Billboard's Hot 100 60th Anniversary chart.

Between late October and mid-December 1969 the single spent eight weeks at the top of the UK Singles Chart. "Sugar, Sugar" was awarded a gold disc in January 1970. In July 2026 the song was certified Platinum by the BPI for selling 600,000 units since it was made available digitally in November 2004.

In the chart dated September 13, 1969, "Sugar, Sugar" topped the RPM 100 national singles chart in Canada, where it remained for three weeks. It also peaked at number one on the South African Singles Chart. On February 5, 2006, "Sugar, Sugar" was inducted into the Canadian Songwriters Hall of Fame, as co-writer Andy Kim is originally from Montreal, Quebec.

=== Charts ===
==== Weekly charts ====
Chart (1969–1970)	Peak position
Argentina (Escalera a la fama)	6
Australia (Go-Set)	5
Australia (Kent Music Report)	6
Austria (Ö3 Austria Top 40)	1
Belgium (Ultratop 50 Flanders)	1
Belgium (Ultratop 50 Wallonia)	4
Brazil (IBOPE)	1
Canada Top Singles (RPM)	1
Denmark (IFPI)	1
Finland (Suomen virallinen lista)	6
Germany (GfK)	1
Ireland (IRMA)	1
Italy (Musica e dischi)	11
Malaysia (Radio Malaysia)	2
Mexico (Radio Mil)	1
Netherlands (Dutch Top 40)	4
Netherlands (Single Top 100)	3
Norway (VG-lista)	1
Philippines	2
Rhodesia (Lyons Maid)	1
Singapore (Radio Singapore)	1
South Africa (Springbok Radio)	1
Spain (Promusicae)	1
Sweden (Sveriges Radio)	1
Switzerland (Schweizer Hitparade)	2
Turkey (Milliyet)	2
UK Singles (Official Charts)	1
US Billboard Hot 100	1
US Adult Contemporary (Billboard)	22
US Cash Box Top 100	1

==== Year-end charts ====
Chart (1969)	Position
Canada Top Singles (RPM)	2
Netherlands (Dutch Top 40)	21
Netherlands (Single Top 100)	55
South Africa (Springbok Radio)	8
UK Singles (OCC)	1
US Billboard Hot 100	1
US Cash Box Top 100	1

=== Certifications and sales ===
Region	Certification	Certified units/sales
Germany	—	500,000
Mexico	—	300,000
New Zealand (RMNZ)	Platinum	30,000^{‡}
United Kingdom 1969 original release	—	1,000,000
United Kingdom (BPI) 2004 digital re-release	Platinum	600,000^{‡}
United States (RIAA)	Gold	3,000,000
Summaries
Worldwide 1969 sales	—	6,000,000
^{‡} Sales+streaming figures based on certification alone.

== Cover versions ==
=== Wilson Pickett version ===
"Sugar Sugar"
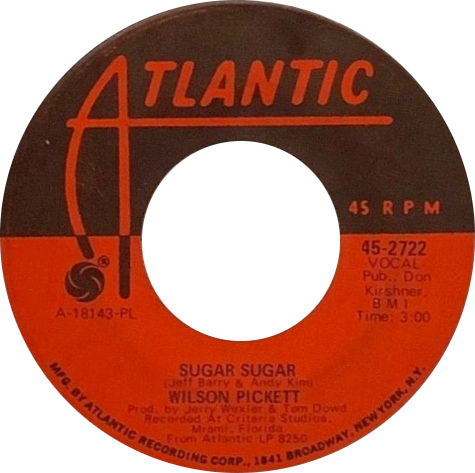
- One of side-A labels of US single

Single by Wilson Pickett

from the album Right On
- B-side: "Cole, Cooke & Redding"
- Released: April 1970
- Recorded: 1969
- Studio: Criteria, Miami
- Genre: Soul
- Length: 3:00
- Label: Atlantic
- Songwriters: Andy Kim, Jeff Barry
- Producers: Jerry Wexler, Tom Dowd

Wilson Pickett singles chronology
"You Keep Me Hangin' On" (1969)	"Sugar Sugar" (1970)	"She Said Yes" (1970)

==== Chart performance ====
In May 1970, Wilson Pickett's cover of "Sugar, Sugar" reached No. 4 on Billboard's R&B chart, then in June peaked at No. 25 on the Hot 100. The parent album, Right On, reached No. 197 on the Billboard 200 album chart. Pickett's recording was used in Ang Lee's 1997 film The Ice Storm. In Canada, "Cole, Cooke & Redding" was the A-side and charted first, reaching No. 58 in April 1970.

===== Charts =====
Chart (1970)	Peak position
Australia (Kent Music Report)	77
Canada Top Singles (RPM)	18

=== Other versions ===
- Sakkarin (a pseudonym of Jonathan King) recorded the song (as "Sugar Sugar") in 1971, reaching No. 12 in the UK chart as well as No. 20 in Ireland and No. 21 in Germany.
- Ron Dante, lead singer of the Archies, recorded a disco version of the song in 1975.
- Josie and the Pussycats, another Archie Comics creation, covered the song (as "Candy Girl (Sugar Sugar)") in the first season of the TV series Riverdale.

== Sources ==
- The Billboard Book of Number 1 Hits, fifth edition. ISBN 978-0823076772. Billboard Books. 2003
