= The Archies =

Fictional music group

Background information
- Origin: Riverdale (fictional); New York City, U.S. (actual)
- Genre: Bubblegum
- Years active: 1968–1973; 1990; 2008; 2020–2023
- Labels: Calendar/Kirshner; RCA; Brylen; Fuel 2000; WaterTower Music; Sony Music India
- Past members: Fictional: Archie Andrews; Jughead Jones; Reggie Mantle; Betty Cooper; Veronica Lodge; Kevin Keller (Riverdale only); Actual: Ron Dante; Toni Wine; Jeff Barry; Donna Marie; Merle Miller; Bob Levine; Andy Kim; Ritchie Adams; Bobby Bloom; Ellie Greenwich; Lesley Miller; Hugh McCracken; Gary Chester; Buddy Saltzman; Chuck Rainey; Dave Appell; Susan Morse; Maeretha Stewart; Joey Macho; Ron Frangipane; Sal DiTroia
- Website: TheArchiesMusic on Twitter

The Archies are an American fictional rock band featured in media produced by, and related to, Archie Comics. They are best remembered for their appearance in the animated TV series The Archie Show. In the context of the series, the band was founded by guitarist/vocalist Archie Andrews, drummer Jughead Jones, bassist Reggie Mantle, percussionist/vocalist Betty Cooper and keyboardist/vocalist Veronica Lodge.

The music featured in the series was recorded by session musicians, including Ron Dante on lead vocals and Toni Wine on duet and backing vocals. The recordings were released as a series of singles and albums that achieved worldwide chart success. Their most successful song, "Sugar, Sugar", became one of the biggest hits of the bubblegum pop genre that flourished from the late 60s to early 70s.

In 2020, a new version of the band was introduced in the TV series Riverdale, with Kevin Keller replacing Reggie Mantle. However, the band continues to appear with the five original members in the comic books published by Archie Comics. A feature film of the Archies was produced for Netflix, and was released on December 7, 2023.

== History ==
=== Conception ===
The Archies first appeared in a comic book, Life with Archie No. 60 (April 1967). The fictional band was inspired by the success of the 1966 TV series The Monkees; in particular, Don Kirshner, who had managed the initially fictional band, wanted a musical act that he could fully control: as the Monkees were fictional but still used the real musicians' names, the musicians themselves became increasingly irritated at being micromanaged, leading to a dispute that culminated in Kirshner being fired. To avoid a repeat of the Monkees fiasco while still allowing himself full control, Kirshner commissioned a band based on cartoon characters—if the session musicians tried to rebel or leave, they could be replaced seamlessly. The early stories copied the TV show's fast cuts and action: "There were pages that had no panel-to-panel continuity at all, just pure strings of nonsense, fantasy, fourth-wall breaking, and exasperated commentary from Betty and Veronica." The feature ended in issue No. 66.

=== Production ===
A set of studio musicians was assembled by Don Kirshner in 1968 to perform various songs. Their most famous song is "Sugar, Sugar", written by Jeff Barry and Andy Kim, which went to number one on the Billboard Hot 100 in 1969, sold over six million copies, and was awarded a gold disc. In the Billboard Hot 100, it was ranked as the No. 1 song of that year, the only time a fictional band has ever claimed Billboard's annual Hot 100 top spot. Other Top 40 songs recorded by the Archies include "Who's Your Baby?" (U.S. No. 40), "Bang-Shang-A-Lang" (U.S. No. 22), and "Jingle Jangle" (U.S. No. 10). "Jingle Jangle" also sold over one million copies, garnering a second gold disc award. Their records were released on the Calendar Records label, which was shortly thereafter renamed to Kirshner Records.

Male vocals for the fictional Archies group were provided by The Cuff Links' lead singer Ron Dante and female duet vocals were provided by Toni Wine. Wine, who was only paid for the recording session and quit the group when "Jingle Jangle" became a huge hit, was succeeded in 1970 by Donna Marie, who in turn was replaced on the final recordings by Merle Miller. The only Archies song not to feature Ron Dante on lead was 1971's "Love Is Living In You", sung by Bob Levine (co-author of the song) and produced by Ritchie Adams. The last single, released in 1972, was "Strangers In The Morning".

Jeff Barry, Andy Kim, Ritchie Adams, Bobby Bloom, Ellie Greenwich, Lesley Miller, Susan Morse and Maeretha Stewart contributed background vocals at various times, with Barry contributing his trademark bass voice (assigned to Jughead in the cartoons) on cuts such as "Jingle Jangle", "Rock 'n' Roll Music", "A Summer Prayer For Peace" (which hit number one in South Africa and Scandinavia in 1971), and "You Little Angel, You". Musicians on the Archies' records included guitarists Hugh McCracken and Dave Appell, drummers Gary Chester and Buddy Saltzman, bassists Chuck Rainey and Joey Macho, and keyboard player Ron Frangipane.

The sound engineer was Fred Weinberg, who was Jeff Barry's and Andy Kim's favorite and also recorded Barry's other hits "Be My Baby", "Baby, I Love You", and Kim's "Rock Me Gently". Fred Weinberg is a composer and producer in his own right. However, the music for The U.S. of Archie, which aired in 1974, was produced by Jackie Mills, a Hollywood producer, who also produced Bobby Sherman and the Brady Kids. The vocalist for these shows was Tom McKenzie, who also sang on some Groovie Goolies segments, and was a regular member of the popular singing group Doodletown Pipers.

According to Ron Dante, over 100 songs were recorded, but at least 40 went unreleased. In 2020, Sunset Blvd Records released Ron Dante's Funhouse!, which includes some of the unreleased songs and most of the "Dance of the Week" segments, all of them pulled straight from Archie's Funhouse and The Archie Show, respectively.

Some of the group's songs have appeared on episodes of the TV series Riverdale. The group made its debut in Riverdale, in the musical episode "Chapter Seventy-Four: Wicked Little Town", for only the second time in a live-action adaptation after the television film Archie: To Riverdale and Back Again in 1990. It includes KJ Apa as Archie, Cole Sprouse as Jughead, Lili Reinhart as Betty, Camila Mendes as Veronica and Casey Cott as Kevin Keller. For the first time, Kevin Keller is part of the group, replacing Reggie Mantle (played by Charles Melton). Kevin sings and plays keyboard. The song "Midnight Radio" was included in the series' musical episode soundtrack, which was released by WaterTower Music on April 15, 2020.

=== Live-action adaptation ===
On November 10, 2021, Netflix announced the Indian live-action feature film adaptation of the Archies of the same name. The film was produced by Tiger Baby Films and Graphic India with Zoya Akhtar as director, starring Agastya Nanda as Archie, Mihir Ahuja as Jughead, Vedang Raina as Reggie, Khushi Kapoor as Betty and Suhana Khan as Veronica, alongside others. Filming started on April 18, 2022, and then ended on December 19, 2022.

The film was released on December 7, 2023. The film's soundtrack was released by Sony Music India on November 25, 2023.

== Fictional line-up ==
The Archies play a variety of contemporary popular music, consistent with the era in which the comic is drawn. Most of the members sing vocals, with Jughead handling the bass voice on a few tracks. Their singing voices were soft and appropriate for pop vocals, but their speaking voices were much different, as their speaking roles were played by voice actors. The roles that the teens play in the fictional band are:

- Archie Andrews – guitars, vocals
- Jughead Jones – drums
- Reggie Mantle – bass (sometimes depicted as a guitar), vocals
- Betty Cooper – percussion, vocals
- Veronica Lodge – keyboards, vocals
- Kevin Keller – keyboards, vocals (Riverdale only)

One distribution mode for the Archies' music was embossing cardboard records directly onto the back of cereal boxes, which were cut out and played on a turntable (although their music was also available on standard issue LPs and 45s).

Though the group no longer appears in animation, they are still frequently used in stories published by Archie Comics. In 2020, the group made its second live-action appearance on Riverdale, with Kevin Keller replacing Reggie Mantle. In this incarnation, Kevin sings and plays keyboard, and Veronica sings only.

== Discography ==
- The Archies (1968)
- Everything's Archie (1969)
- Jingle Jangle (1969)
- Sunshine (1970)
- This Is Love (1971)
- The Archies Christmas Album (2008)
