= Lou Christie discography =

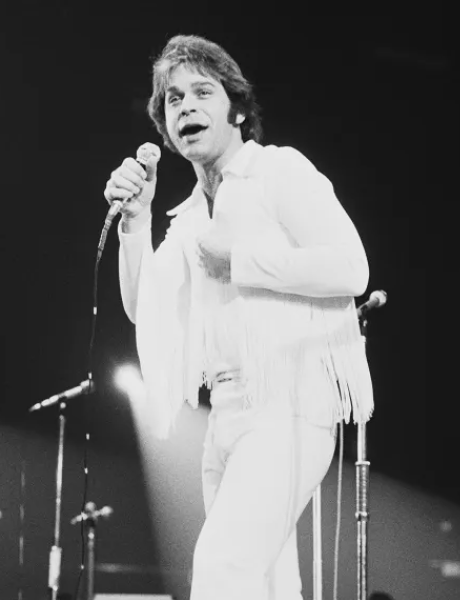
- Lou Christie singing to an audience in 1970
- Studio albums: 13
- Live albums: 1
- Compilation albums: 10
- Singles: 36

This is the discography of American pop singer Lou Christie. It contains 13 studio albums, 10 compilation albums, 36 singles and other releases. His debut single was 1962's "The Gypsy Cried", released on Roulette Records. The single was an immediate hit, reaching the pop top-20 in the US and the top-5 in Canada. It eventually sold over a million copies.

The following single "Two Faces Have I" reached the pop top-5 in both countries, in addition to charting in Australia and on the US R&B charts. Subsequently, Roulette released a studio album titled Lou Christie, which reached the charts as well. Christie's next singles would fare worse on the charts, and by 1964, he completely missed them with "Stay". During this time, he was in the army. His Colpix Records contract expired in 1965, and he signed MGM Records, with whom he had his biggest hits. "Lightnin' Strikes" was his debut single for the label and it quickly reached number 1 in multiple territories. It was his first in the UK as well, peaking at number 11. An album with the same name followed and reached the charts soon after its release. His next MGM release was "Rhapsody in the Rain" which brought him to the pop top-20 again. An album featuring it and the lesser hit "Painter" followed.

After leaving MGM in 1967, he signed Columbia Records. He had three minor chart releases and no albums. His Buddah Records contract started off the same in 1968, but in 1969 he received his final top-10 hit titled "I'm Gonna Make You Mine". It nearly topped the charts in the UK as well. The following single, "Are You Getting Any Sunshine?" charted lower. The final release for the label was "Indian Lady", which had only done somewhat well in Australia and on the Billboard Easy Listening charts. For Three Brother Records similar pop results were achieved with "Beyond the Blue Horizon", but in contrast to other releases, it was a major Easy Listening hit. "Spanish Wine" was his final charting release, peaking at number 95 in 1977. A few more collaboration singles followed in later decades.

== Albums ==
List of studio albums, showing all relevant details
Title	Album details	Peak chart positions
Title	Album details	US
Lou Christie	Released: 1963; Label: Roulette; Formats: LP	124
Lou Christie Strikes Again	Released: 1966; Label: Colpix; Formats: LP	—
Lightnin' Strikes	Released: 1966; Label: MGM; Formats: LP	103
Painter Of Hits	Released: 1966; Label: MGM; Formats: LP	—
I'm Gonna Make You Mine	Released: 1969; Label: Buddah; Formats: LP	—
Paint America Love	Released: 1971; Label: Buddah; Formats: LP	—
Lou Christie	Released: 1974; Label: Three Brothers Records; Formats: LP	—
Lou Christie	Released: 1974; Label: Three Brothers Records; Formats: LP	—
Lou Christie Does Detroit	Released: 1982; Label: 51 West; Formats: LP, CD	—
Pledging My Love	Released: 1997; Label: Varèse Sarabande; Formats: LP, CD	—
Greatest Hits Live From The Bottom Line	Released: 2004; Label: Varèse Sarabande; Formats: LP, CD	—
The Turquoise Trail	Released: 2012; Label: Lightning Strikes; Formats: LP, CD	—
Summer In Malibu	Released: 2015; Label: Lightning Strikes; Formats: LP, CD	—

== Collections, compilation albums ==
List of compilation albums, showing all relevant details
Title	Album details
Rhapsody In The Grooves: His Finest Recordings 1962–1969	Released: 1984; Label: Raven Records; Formats: LP, compilation
EnLightnin'ment — The Best of Lou Christie	Released: April 25, 1988; Label: Rhino; Formats: LP & cassette tape, compilation
Glory River — The Buddah Years 1968–1972	Released: 1992; Label: Sequel; Formats: CD, compilation
Greatest Hits Vol. 1	Released: 1993; Label: Lightning Strikes; Formats: CD, compilation
Beyond The Blue Horizon: More of the Best	Released: 1994; Label: Varèse Sarabande; Formats: CD, compilation
Greatest Hits Vol. 2	Released: 1997; Label: Lightning Strikes; Formats: CD, compilation
Egyptian Shumba: Singles & Rare Recordings 1962–64	Released: 2001; Label: RPM; Formats: CD, compilation; Notes: with The Tammys
Original Sinner: The Very Best Of The MGM Recordings	Released: 2004; Label: RPM; Formats: CD, compilation
Studio 102 Essentials	Released: 2008; Label: Studio 102; Formats: CD, compilation
Gypsy Bells — Columbia Recordings 1967	Released: 2024; Label: Ace; Formats: CD, compilation

== Singles ==
List of singles, with selected chart positions, showing other relevant details
Title	Year	Peak chart positions							Record Label	B-side From same album as A-side except where indicated	Album
Title	Year	US BB	US CB	US AC	US R&B	UK	CAN (CHUM) (RPM)	AUS	Record Label	B-side From same album as A-side except where indicated	Album
"The Gypsy Cried"	1962	24	18	—	—	—	3	—	Roulette Records	"Red Sails in the Sunset" (Non-LP track)	Lou Christie
"Two Faces Have I"	1963	6	3	—	11	—	3	20	Roulette Records	"All That Glitters Isn't Gold"	Lou Christie
"How Many Teardrops"	1963	46	41	—	—	—	23	79	Roulette Records	"You and I (Have a Right to Cry)"(No. 119 US CB)	Lou Christie
"Shy Boy"	1963	119	135	—	—	—	—	—	Roulette Records	"It Can Happen"	Non-LP tracks
"Stay"	1964	—	—	—	—	—	—	—	Roulette Records	"There They Go" (Non-LP track)	Lou Christie
"Guitars and Bongos"	1964	123	131	—	—	—	44	—	Colpix Records	"Merry-Go-Round" (Non-LP track)	Lou Christie Strikes Again
"Have I Sinned"	1964	—	—	—	—	—	—	—	Colpix Records	"Pot of Gold"	Lou Christie Strikes Again
"Why Did You Do It Baby"	1965	—	—	—	—	—	—	—	Colpix Records	"Make Summer Last Forever"	Lou Christie Strikes Again
"A Teenager in Love"	1965	—	—	—	—	—	—	—	Colpix Records	"Back Track"	Lou Christie Strikes Again
"Lightnin' Strikes"	1965	1	1	—	—	11	1	9	MGM Records	"Cryin' in the Streets"	Lightnin' Strikes
"Outside the Gates of Heaven"	1966	45	59	—	—	—	32	—	Co & Ce Records	"All That Glitters Isn't Gold"	Non-LP tracks
"Big Time"	1966	95	—	—	—	—	—	—	Colpix Records	"Cryin' on My Knees"	Lou Christie Strikes Again
"Rhapsody in the Rain"	1966	16	20	—	—	37	10	40	MGM Records	"Trapeze" (from Lightning Strikes)	Painter of Hits
"Painter"	1966	81	77	—	—	—	60	—	MGM Records	"Du Ronda"	Painter of Hits
"If My Car Could Only Talk"	1966	118	—	—	—	—	—	—	MGM Records	"Song of Lita"	Non-LP tracks
"Since I Don't Have You"	1966	102	101	—	—	—	71	—	MGM Records	"Wild Life's in Season"	Painter of Hits
"Shake Hands and Walk Away Cryin'"	1967	95	—	—	—	—	—	—	Columbia Records	"Escape"	Non-LP tracks
"Self Expression (The Kids on the Street Will Never Give In)"	1967	—	127	—	—	—	—	—	Columbia Records	"Back to the Days of the Romans"	Non-LP tracks
"I Remember Gina"	1967	—	139	—	—	—	—	—	Columbia Records	"Escape"	Non-LP tracks
"Don't Stop Me (Jump Off the Edge of Love)"	1967	—	—	—	—	—	—	—	Columbia Records	"Back to the Days of the Romans"	Non-LP tracks
"Genesis and the Third Verse"	1968	—	—	—	—	—	—	—	Buddah Records	"Rake Up the Leaves"	Non-LP tracks
"Canterbury Road"	1968	—	—	—	—	—	—	—	Buddah Records	"Saints of Aquarius"	Non-LP tracks
"I'm Gonna Make You Mine"	1969	10	7	—	—	2	5	28	Buddah Records	"I'm Gonna Get Married"	I'm Gonna Make You Mine
"Are You Getting Any Sunshine?"	1969	73	84	—	—	—	56	—	Buddah Records	"It'll Take Time"	I'm Gonna Make You Mine
"Love Is Over"	1970	—	—	—	—	—	—	—	Buddah Records	"She Sold Me Magic" (from I'm Gonna Make You Mine) (No. 25 UK) (No. 1 JP)	Non-LP tracks
"Indian Lady"	1970	106	75	39	—	—	—	89	Buddah Records	"Glory River"	Non-LP tracks
"Lighthouse"	1971	—	—	—	—	—	—	—	Three Brothers Records	"Waco"	Paint America Love
"Sing Me, Sing Me"	1972	—	—	—	—	—	—	—	Three Brothers Records	"Paper Song"	Paint America Love
"Blue Canadian Rocky Dream"	1973	—	102	—	—	—	—	—	Three Brothers Records	"Wilma Lee and Stoney"	Lou Christie
"Beyond the Blue Horizon"	1974	80	72	12	—	—	57	—	Three Brothers Records	"Saddle the Wind"	Lou Christie
"Good Mornin'/Zip-a-Dee-Doo-Dah"	1974	—	—	—	—	—	—	—	Three Brothers Records	"You Were the One"	Lou Christie
"Summer Days"	1975	—	120	—	—	—	—	—	Slipped Disc Records	"The One and Only Original Sunshine Kid"	Non-LP tracks
"Riding in My Van"	1976	—	—	—	—	—	—	—	Epic Records	"Summer in Malibu"	Non-LP tracks
"You're Gonna Make Love to Me"	1976	—	—	—	—	—	—	—	Midland International Records	"Fantasies"	Non-LP tracks
"Spanish Wine"	1977	—	95	—	—	—	—	—	Midland International Records	"Dancing in the Sand"	Non-LP tracks
Lou Christie/Lesley Gore "Since I Don't Have You"/"It's Only Make Believe"	1986	—	—	—	—	—	—	—	Manhattan Records	"Our Love Was Meant To Be"	Non-LP tracks
Lou Christie/Pia Zadora "Don't Knock My Love" (shortVersion)	1990	—	—	—	—	—	—	—	Midsong Records	"Don't Knock My Love" (LongVersion)	Non-LP tracks
