= EnLightnin'ment =

Compilation album by Lou Christie
- Released: April 25, 1988
- Genre: Pop
- Length: LP (36:48); CD (48:57)
- Label: Rhino
- Producer: Bill Inglot (CD)

Lou Christie chronology
Lou Christie Does Detroit (1982)	EnLightnin'ment (1988)	Pledging My Love (1997)

EnLightnin'ment is a compilation album by singer-songwriter Lou Christie, released by Rhino on March 29, 1988.

== Critical reception ==
Professional ratings
Review scores
Source	Rating
AllMusic	4.5/5 stars

Lynn Van Matre of the Chicago Tribune writes, "One of the big songs of 1966 was Christie's "Lightnin' Strikes", which sold more than a million copies, reached the No. 1 pop single spot, and now serves as the inspiration for the play-on-words title of a new CD collection of the singer-songwriter's vintage hits."

AllMusic gave the album 4½ out of a possible 5 stars.

== Track listing (1988 LP & Cassette Tape release) ==
All tracks are written by Lou Christie and Twyla Herbert, unless otherwise noted.

Side A
No.	Title	Writer(s)	Original release	Length
1.	"The Gypsy Cried"		C&C #102 (October, 1962)	2:08
2.	"Two Faces Have I"		Roulette #4481 (February, 1963)	2:43
3.	"Mr. Tenor Man"	Earl Jackson; Gregory Carroll	Roulette LP Lou Christie #25208 (July, 1963)	2:22
4.	"Self Expression (The Kids on the Street Will Never Give In)"		Columbia #44177 (June, 1967)	2:22
5.	"Outside the Gates of Heaven"		Co & Ce #235 (February, 1966)	2:26
6.	"How Many Teardrops"	Rick Rodell	Roulette #4504 (July, 1963)	2:03
7.	"Trapeze"		MGM #13473 (March, 1966)	2:23

Side B
No.	Title	Writer(s)	Original release	Length
1.	"Lightnin' Strikes"		MGM #13412 (December, 1965)	2:58
2.	"Cryin' in the Streets"		MGM #13412 (December, 1965)	2:41
3.	"Rhapsody in the Rain"		MGM #13473 (March, 1966)	2:44
4.	"If My Car Could Only Talk"		MGM #13576 (September, 1966)	3:17
5.	"Shake Hands And Walk Away Crying"		Columbia #44062 (March, 1967)	2:56
6.	"Back to the Days of the Romans"		Columbia #44177 (June, 1967)	3:06
7.	"I'm Gonna Make You Mine"	Tony Romeo	Buddah #116 (June, 1969)	2:39
Total length:				36:48

1988 Rhino CD release
No.	Title	Writer(s)	Original release	Length
1.	"The Gypsy Cried"		C&C #102 (October, 1962)	2:08
2.	"Two Faces Have I"		Roulette #4481 (February, 1963)	2:43
3.	"Summer Snow"		Previously unreleased (1963)	2:41
4.	"Mr. Tenor Man"	Gregory Carrol; Earl Jackson	Roulette LP Lou Christie #25208 (July, 1963)	2:22
5.	"Self Expression (The Kids on the Street Will Never Give In)"		Columbia #44177 (June, 1967)	2:22
6.	"Outside the Gates of Heaven"		Co & CE #235 (February, 1966)	2:26
7.	"How Many Teardrops"	Rick Rodell	Roulette #4504 (July, 1963)	2:03
8.	"Shy Boy"		Roulette #4527 (October, 1963)	2:56
9.	"Trapeze"		MGM #13473 (March 1966)	2:23
10.	"Lightnin' Strikes"		MGM #13412 (December, 1965)	2:58
11.	"Cryin' in the Streets"		MGM #13412 (December, 1965)	2:41
12.	"Rhapsody in the Rain"		MGM #13473 (March, 1966)	2:44
13.	"Du Ronda"		MGM #13533 (June, 1966)	3:02
14.	"Watch Your Heart After Dark"		Previously unreleased (1966)	3:30
15.	"If My Car Could Only Talk"		MGM #13576 (September, 1966)	3:17
16.	"Shake Hands and Walk Away Crying"		Columbia #44062 (March, 1967)	2:56
17.	"Back to the Days of the Romans"		Columbia #44177 (June, 1967)	3:06
18.	"I'm Gonna Make You Mine"	Tony Romeo	Buddah #116 (June, 1969)	2:39
Total length:				48:57

Track information and credits adapted from the album's liner notes.

== Production ==
- Art Direction – Don Brown
- Compilation – Harry Young, Gary Stewart
- Design – Judy Bryan
- Lacquer Cut By – Ken Perry
- Photos, Liner notes – Harry Young
- Project assistance – James Austin and Gary Peterson
- Producers
  - Charles Calello (tracks A4, A7, B1 to B3, B5, B6), (tracks 16–17 on CD)
  - George Goldner (tracks A5)
  - Jack Nitzsche (tracks B4), (track 15 on CD)
  - Mike Duckman (tracks B7), (track 18 on CD)
  - Stan Vincent (tracks B7), (track 18 on CD)
  - Nick Cenci (tracks A1 to A3, A5, A6)
  - Bill Inglot – Compact Disc
- Remastered by Bill Inglot
- All the tracks on the CD were taken from absolute first generation master tapes.
