= The Tammys =

American girl group

- Genre: Pop
- Years active: 1962–1965
- Labels: United Artists, Veep, Ascot, Co & Ce, Colpix
- Past members: Gretchen Owens; Cathy Owens; Linda Jones

The Tammys were an American girl group made up of sisters Gretchen and Cathy Owens and their friend Linda Jones. They are best known for their song "Egyptian Shumba." Billboard named the song #35 on its list of 100 Greatest Girl Group Songs of All Time.

== Early years ==
In high school, Cathy and Gretchen participated in a group called the Impressions. Billed as the Charnelles, Cathy, Gretchen and Linda first performed on March 31, 1962 at a school talent show. Early, they were thrown out of a local restaurant for singing along to the jukebox. "We'll be on that jukebox someday", they vowed.

== Lou Christie ==
The girls first met Lou Christie in 1961 at a concert where he was performing in the band Lugee and The Lions. He took them for a ride in his Cadillac. He sang while they did back-up harmony. He told them "If I ever get discovered, I'll call you", and they said the same to him. A year later, Christie hit it big with his single "The Gypsy Cried", and he brought the girls in to sing backup for him. He also signed them to a contract with United Artists, and they recorded three singles. Despite local airplay, "Take Back Your Ring", "Gypsy", and "Egyptian Shumba" all failed to chart nationally throughout 1963 and 1964. By 1965, Christie was using another tough sounding girl group to back him, Jessica James and the Outlaws, which consisted of Bernadette Carroll, Denise Ferri, and Peggy Santiglia. Meanwhile, the Tammys continued to play local shows and sing background tracks until later in the decade; but with three no-hit singles to their credit, the group became a footnote in music history.

== Renewed interest ==
As Northern Soul hit Britain in the early 1970s and spurred a renewed interest in girl groups, collectors began searching for all sorts of rare records from the 1960s. Looking especially for songs with a dance groove, "Egyptian Shumba" was unearthed and became a cult classic.

In 2002 all of the Tammys' singles plus two previously unreleased tracks were released on a CD titled Egyptian Shumba – The Singles and Rare Recordings: 1962–1964. The collection also contains several Christie hits with backing vocals by the Tammys. "Egyptian Shumba" was included in the Grammy nominated box set One Kiss Can Lead to Another: Girl Group Sounds, Lost and Found.

In 2006, Pitchfork Media included "Egyptian Shumba" in its list of top 200 songs of the 1960s at number 177.

Cathy Owens died in October 2022.

== Solo discography ==
- "Take Back Your Ring"/Part of Growing Up", United Artists 632—1963
- "Egyptian Shumba"/What's So Sweet About Sweet Sixteen", United Artists 678—1963
- "Hold Back the Light of Dawn"/"Gypsy", Veep 1210–1965
- "Blue Sixteen"/His Actions Speak Louder Than Words", Veep 1220–1965 (unreleased until 2002)

== See also ==
- Twyla Herbert
