= Jessica James and the Outlaws =

Jessica James and the Outlaws was a 1960s American girl vocal trio. The group of Bernadette Carroll, Denise Ferri and Peggy Santiglia recorded singles under their own name and also sang backing for singers such as Frankie Valli. Santiglia and Carroll had both, separately, been members of The Angels.

The girls were recorded by producers including Charlie Calello, Herb Bernstein, Bob Crewe and Bob Gaudio.

== Members ==
- Bernadette Carroll (June 21, 1945 – October 5, 2018)
- Denise Ferri (June 2, 1944 – October 29, 2020)
- Peggy Santiglia (born May 4, 1944)

== Discography ==
- "Give Her Up, Baby", B-side "Come Closer"
- "We'll Be Makin' Out", B-side "Lucky Day"
- "Blue Skies"
- "Dixie" (released under pseudonym Tiffany Michele)

=== Backing ===
- Frankie Valli – "You're Ready Now"
- Frankie Valli – "Cry For Me"
- Lou Christie – "Lightnin' Strikes"
- Lou Christie – "Rhapsody in the Rain"
- Lou Christie Pepsi-Cola commercial
