= The Hounds discography =

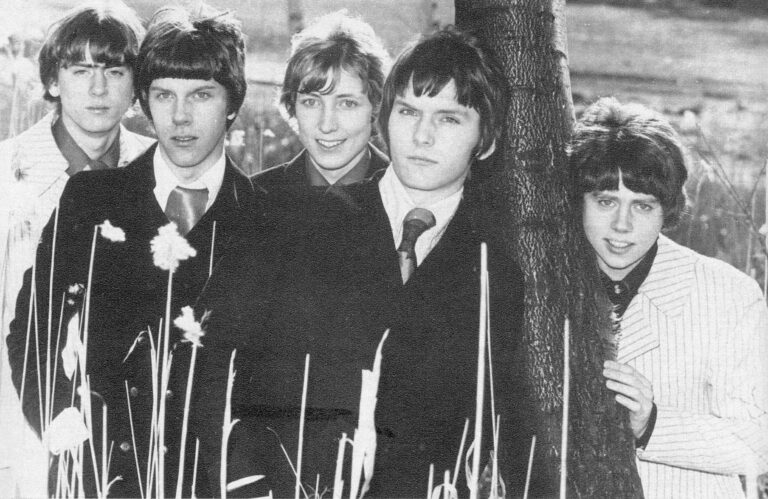
- The Hounds in 1968
- Studio albums: 2
- Compilation albums: 2
- Singles: 10
- B-sides: 10

The Hounds were a Swedish pop rock band from Stockholm formed in 1965 by vocalist Jan Ahlén, rhythm guitarist Henrik Salander, lead guitarist Lasse Wallander, bass guitarist Jan Bråthe and drummer Janne Önnerud. During the band's original tenure between 1965 and 1968, they released two studio albums, two extended plays and ten singles in Sweden. Between November 1966 and April 1968, the Hounds were considered one of the most popular bands in Sweden, with six of their singles reaching the top-10 of national record chart Tio i Topp. Their 1967 cover of "The Lion Sleeps Tonight" reached number one on both Tio i Topp and sales chart Kvällstoppen for most of that summer, and has such been labelled the Swedish summer hit of that year. Their two studio albums, The Lion Sleeps Tonight and From the Hounds with Love (both 1967) featured "topical songs" such as The Times They Are a-Changin'" or freakbeat in "Hi Ho Silver Lining", the former of which was a charting album in Finland. By the summer of 1968, the members raised speculation about dissolving the band, and they performed their final gig in September 1968 after which they pursued separate personal interests.

Being a fledling and unexperienced pop band, the Hounds started their career by recording cover versions of contemporary pop songs which were released on a string of low-budget compilation extended plays. These covers included "Till the End of the Day" (the Kinks) and "Sloop John B" (the Beach Boys). The group were signed to Telefunken for their debut single "Very Last Day", which was their first recording to receive any attention. After recording an experimental EP against their will for the Jet label, the Hounds signed with Sonet sub-label Gazell, who released nine singles by the band alongside their two studio albums. The Hounds final Gazell single was recorded and released in 1972 after a brief reunion. Throughout the 1970s and 1980s, tracks by the group appeared on several compilation albums of music by Swedish pop artists, before their work were collected on the compilations Hounds by Sonet in 1991, and The Lion Sleeps Tonight: The Best of the Hounds by Universal Music in 2003.

== Albums ==
=== Studio albums ===
List of studio albums with selected chart positions
Year	Title	Album details	Peak chart positions
Year	Title	Swedish release (Note: Neither of the Hounds two studio albums charted as Kvällstoppen was largely aimed at single releases during the mid-1960s.)	FIN
1967	The Lion Sleeps Tonight	Released: 7 April 1967; Label: Gazell (GMG-1207)	7
1967	From the Hounds with Love	Released: 4 December 1967; Label: Gazel (GMG-1209)	—
"—" denotes releases that did not chart or were not released in that territory.

=== Compilation albums ===
List of compilation albums
Year	Title	Album details
1991	Hounds	Released: 1991; Label: Sonet (SPCD-56)
2002	The Lion Sleeps Tonight: The Best of the Hounds (Note: Contains different tracklisting to their studio album of the same name.)	Released: 2002 (Note: Released as part of the Universal Music re-issue series Pop of the 60s, which also included compilation albums by the Lee Kings and the Deejays.); Label: Universal (018 337-2)

== EPs ==
List of Swedish EPs with selected chart positions
Year	Title	EP details	Peak chart positions
Year	Title	EP details	SWE (Kvällstoppen)
1966	Now!	Released: 17 June 1966; Label: Jet (EP 01)	—
1966	Exodus	Released: 1966; Label: Gazell (GEP-72)	11 (Note: The EP's lead single "Exodus" reached number 11 on Kvällstoppen.)
"—" denotes releases that did not chart.

== Singles ==
List of singles, with selected chart positions and certifications
Year	Single details	Peak chart positions				Album or EP
Year	Single details	SWE (Kvällstoppen)	SWE (Tio i Topp)	FIN	DEN	Album or EP
1966	"Very Last Day" b/w "The Same Again": Released: 19 May 1966 (SE); Label: Telefunken (U 5439)	—	—	x	x	non-album single
1966	"Exodus" b/w "Sloop John B": Released: 14 July 1966 (SE); Label: Gazell (C-185)	—	—	x	x	non-album single (Note: "Exodus" was later included on the album The Lion Sleeps Tonight.)
1966	"Exodus" b/w "A Car, A Boat, A House, A Girl Like You": Released: 6 October 1966 (SE); Label: Gazell (C-189)	11	3	x	x	non-album single (Note: Both sides of the single were later included on the album The Lion Sleeps Tonight.)
1967	"Sealed with a Kiss" b/w "My World Fell Down" (from The Lion Sleeps Tonight): Released: 24 March 1967 (SE); Label: Gazell (C-193)	4	2	x	x	The Lion Sleeps Tonight
1967	"The Lion Sleeps Tonight" b/w "I Like The Rhythm" (from The Lion Sleeps Tonight): Released: 31 May 1967 (SE); Label: Gazell (C-199)	1	1	7	8	The Lion Sleeps Tonight
1967	"A Summer Song" b/w "Never Try to Catch the Sun" (from From the Hounds with Love): Released: 23 August 1967 (SE); Label: Gazell (C-201)	18	6	x	x	non-album single (Note: Both sides of the single were later included on the album From the Hounds With Love.)
1967	"I'll Take You Where The Music's Playing" b/w "The Office Girl" (from From the Hounds with Love): Released: 5 November 1967 (SE); Label: Gazell (C-207)	19	4	x	x	From the Hounds with Love
1968						From the Hounds with Love
1968	"The Gipsy Cried" b/w "Old Man in New York" (from From the Hounds with Love): Released: 7 January 1968 (SE); Label: Gazell (C-209)	17	4	x	x	From the Hounds with Love
1968	"Portrait of My Love" b/w "Summertown": Released: 21 March 1968 (SE); Label: Gazell (C-216)	—	—	x	x	non-album single
1972
1972	"Dum-De-Da" b/w "En värld av fantasi" (from From the Hounds with Love): Released: 1972 (SE); Label: Gazell (C-263)	—	—	x	x	non-album single
"—" denotes releases that did not chart. "x" denotes single not released in that territory.
