= My Boyfriend's Back =

My Boyfriend's Back may refer to:

- My Boyfriend's Back (film), a 1993 American film
- "My Boyfriend's Back" (song), a hit song in 1963 for the Angels
- My Boyfriend's Back (album), a 1963 album by the Angels
