= Egyptian Shumba =

Song by American girl group the Tammys released in 1963

Single by the Tammys
- B-side: "What's So Sweet About Sweet Sixteen"
- Released: February 1964
- Recorded: November 1, 1963
- Genre: Brill Building pop; novelty
- Length: 2:16
- Label: United Artists Records
- Songwriters: Lou Christie; Twyla Herbert
- Producer: Jack Gold

The Tammys singles chronology
"Take Back Your Ring" (1963)	"Egyptian Shumba" (1964)	"Hold Back the Light of Dawn" (1965)

"Egyptian Shumba" is a song by American girl group the Tammys, released as a single in November 1963 on United Artists Records.

== Composition ==
"Egyptian Shumba" is a fast-paced, two-chord pop song in the tradition of the fad dance hits that were popular during the 1950s and 1960s, such as "The Twist", "Mashed Potato Time" and "The Loco-Motion". The song is notable for its "crazed" musical arrangement—the work of Garry Sherman—which served as a vehicle to "unleash the barbaric-adolescent spirit" of the Tammys. It opens with a "pseudo-Middle Eastern" clarinet riff that has been compared to the use of the electric organ in garage-rock, and was presumably inspired by Jimmy Gilmer & the Fireballs' "Sugar Shack", the highest-charting single of 1963. The group's high-pitched, nasal harmonies have been compared to those of the Chipmunks, with AllMusic's Andrew Leahey referring to them as their "Brill Building equivalent". Like other dance tracks from the era, "Egyptian Shumba"'s lyrics are brief and inconsequential. The group begins singing "shimmy shimmy shimmy shy-yi meece-e-deece", followed by the first verse: "Last night I dreamed I was on the Nile/Dancing with you Egyptian style/Way down in Egypt land/The mummies took our hand". Throughout the entirety of the track, a reverberated guitar is constantly bending on a single string, conveying a "feeling of delirium". The song's energetic drumming has been described as "troglodytic" and "head-splitting". The overall instrumentation was compared to that of Phil Spector's "Wall of Sound".

In the song's famous hook, the girls' vocals go from being "perky" and "sweet-sounding" to "shrieking, yelping and grunting like nut-jobs", in what has been considered a mimic of monkey screams. Nitsuh Abebe of Pitchfork wrote: "The Tammys bop hard and bratty, but by the chorus they're literally growling, barking, and squealing like sexed-up hyenas; in the bridge you can hear them shudder and jerk their way into a frenzy." Likewise, Wayne Bledsoe of the Knoxville News Sentinel wrote that the song is "filled with yelps and whoops that are nearly orgasmic." Writing for the Observer–Reporter, Brad Hundt felt that the shrieks were "very reminiscent" of Yoko Ono's 1970s work. NME considered "Egyptian Shumba" to be "the closet the [girl group genre] ever got to ripping-up-the-rulebook punk panache". It has also been described as "a template for garage-rock abandon barely held together by bubblegum and hairbands." However, Jaime Cristóbal of Jenesaispop noted that the track's sound and energy "undoubtedly originated not so much from a sudden proto-punk spirit but rather from an attempt to achieve a novelty hit." In like manner, Johnny Black of Q called it "little more than a typical '60s novelty platter".

== Release and reception ==
"Egyptian Shumba" was released as a 7-inch single in February 1964 on United Artists Records. It featured "What's So Sweet About Sweet Sixteen" as its B-side, a teen-angst song written by Larry Kusik, Eddie Snyder, Joan Babbitt and Phyllis St. James. A contemporary review in Cashbox read: "Teen lark threesome could make a chart stand with this engaging teen-dance romp. It's wild, whacky and original. Watch it." Another review in Variety described the song as a "way-out rocking ballad with a rendition that seems to go out of its way to be noisy", while noting that "that could be the sound which will make this disk step out of the pack." Despite being a local top-40 hit in Pittsburgh and a top-30 hit in Cleveland, the single failed to chart nationally.

== Legacy ==
"Egyptian Shumba" has grown to become an underground classic.

During the 2000s, "Egyptian Shumba" became a cult favorite at Northern soul dances.

While reviewing the 2005 compilation One Kiss Can Lead To Another: Girl Group Sounds Lost And Found, Jeremiah Tucker of The Joplin Globe described it as "one of the most peculiar girl group songs I've ever heard, sounding like the modern freak folkers the Animal Collective produced the song". He also felt that "it would blow the minds of indie-music blogs everywhere if released today."

Writing for The Guardian, Joseph Ridgwell called it "the best girl group song ever", praising it as "breathtaking, foot-stomping, soul-shaking" and "mesmerising". Writing a special feature on the Records You've Never Heard But Probably Should for AllMusic in 2008, Andrew Leahey felt that the song's hook was "perhaps some of the wildest, sex-crazed moments in the history of forgotten pop" and concluded: "Forty five years later, the song still sounds electric; it must've sounded positively nuclear back then." In 2006, Pitchfork placed "Egyptian Shumba" at number 177 on its list of the 200 Best Songs of the 1960s, with Nitsuh Abebe writing in its entry: "It's not just that this girl group's gone wilder than any garage band on the list—it's that they're possessed." In 2012, it placed on number seventeen on NME's list of 20 Forgotten 60s Girl Groups, with the publication calling it "one of the strangest and most flawless girl group tracks ever laid to tape". Billboard ranked it thirty fifth on the magazine's 2017 list of the 100 Greatest Girl Group Songs of All Time. In the song's entry, Joe Lynch noted that the track "missed the charts but guaranteed its place in the cult canon by virtue of sheer insanity."

Jaime Cristóbal of Jenesaispop noted that, although the influence of such an unknown record cannot be objectively deduced, it "is still fascinating to draw a genealogical line" between "Egyptian Shumba" and songs like the Bangles' "Walk Like an Egyptian", as well as "any punk band in which a group of women has unleashed similar fierce screams, from the Go-Go’s to Bikini Kill through the Raincoats, Sleater-Kinney or the 5678's." Likewise, Keith Harris wrote in the Seattle Weekly that the Tammys' "squiggly harmonies and delirious yelps seem to point toward Rough Trade punks like Liliput and the Raincoats", and the Pittsburgh Post-Gazette's Scott Mervis called the track a "riot grrrl prototype". Several critics have taken the song as a precursor to the work of new wave band the B-52's, with Billboard's Joe Lynch noting that the Tammys "successfully combined musical kitsch with unhinged screaming 15 years before [their] debut." "Egyptian Shumba" was covered by American indie rock band Black Kids in 2008, with frontman Reggie Youngblood calling it "quite possibly the most punk thing I've ever heard in my life".

== See also ==
- 1963 in music
- Camp (style)
