= Mashu (disambiguation) =

Mashu is a mythological mountain.

Mashu or Mashū may also refer to:

- Mashu, Iran, a village
- Mashu (band), Canterbury scene improvisational group from 1995 to 1998
- Lake Mashū, Hokkaidō, Japan
- Mashū Station, train station Hokkaidō, Japan
- Mashu Baker (born 1994), Japanese judoka
- An alternate Romanization of Masyu, a Nikoli puzzle
