= Stan Vincent =

American record producer/arranger (born 1944)

Stan Vincent (born Stanley Grochowski, 1944) is an American record producer/arranger best known for the Top Ten hits "I'm Gonna Make You Mine" by Lou Christie and "O-o-h Child" by Five Stairsteps. He is also a composer notably having written "O-o-h Child" and several songs recorded by Connie Francis. Stan Vincent also assisted in the making of the 1980 Double Fantasy album by John Lennon and Yoko Ono.

A child actor under his birth name of Stanley Grochowski, playing Jimmy on the Chicago-based NBC-TV Saturday morning educational series Watch Mr. Wizard, Stan Vincent began his music industry career as a teenager working as a gofer at the Brooklyn-based offices of Jim Gribble who managed several doo-wop groups including the Mystics and the Passions, sometimes assisting on the recordings on Gribble's clients: by 1959 Vincent was himself recording his output including two singles backed by the Del Satins. Vincent's releases were overlooked but a recording he produced for the Del Satins of his composition "Teardrops Follow Me" became a regional success in the summer of 1962 and Vincent was afforded his first major success as the producer of the Earls hit "Remember Then" recorded in 1962 which reached #24 in January 1963.

Vincent had several songs recorded by Connie Francis, notably her hit singles "Drownin' My Sorrows" (1963) and "Looking For Love" (1964), the latter being the title song for a cinematic vehicle for Francis - see Looking for Love - in which she sang two other Vincent compositions: "Let's Have a Party" and "When the Clock Strikes Midnight". Francis also recorded the Stan Vincent compositions "Lollipop Lips", "Whatever Happened to Rosemarie" and "Tommy" to serve as the B-sides to her hits "If My Pillow Could Talk" (1962),"Your Other Love" (1963), and "Be Anything (but Be Mine)" (1963). The compositions which Vincent placed with Francis were all co-written with Hank Hunter.

By 1968 Vincent was working for Buddah Records as an in-house producer/arranger and songwriter. In the autumn of 1969 Lou Christie hit #10 nationally with "I'm Gonna Make You Mine" produced and arranged by Vincent: the track was more successful in the UK reaching #2 there. In the summer of 1970 the Five Stairsteps hit #8 with "O-o-h Child" which Vincent not only produced and arranged but composed. Originally intended as the B-side of the 5 Stairsteps' version of "Dear Prudence", "O-o-h Child" has subsequently been remade by over twenty artists, with the 1993 remake - entitled "Ooh Child" - by Dino reaching #27.

Vincent's subsequent collaborations with both Lou Christie and the 5 Stairsteps failed to become major US hits - although Christie's "She Sold Me Magic" reached #25 UK - and Vincent's collaborations with other Buddah artists such as the Brooklyn Bridge, the Edwin Hawkins Singers, the Ronettes, Sha Na Na, and Ronnie Dyson were also not major successes although Dyson's "When You Get Right Down to It" - a Barry Mann composition arranged and produced by Vincent - was a Top 40 UK hit (#34 in 1972). Vincent also produced the recording of "Superstar" by Cher for Atco Records which was issued as a promo single in November 1970 but never given a full release.

In the summer of 1978 Vincent founded his own independent record label Voyage Records whose debut release was a remake produced by Vincent of "I'm Gonna Make You Mine" recorded by Larry Evoy: Voyage Records had no evident success.

Vincent was the business manager for Jack Douglas at the time the latter produced the 1980 John Lennon/Yoko Ono album Double Fantasy: it was at Vincent's house in Montauk that Douglas listened to the demo Lennon had prepared in hopes of recruiting him as producer. Vincent oversaw the negotiations over Lennon and Ono working with Douglas, the negotiations being made with Ono, and also made the arrangements for booking studio time and hiring session personnel: it was Vincent who recommended guitarist Hugh McCracken and keyboardist George Small.
