= The Gypsy Cried =

The Gypsy Cried may refer to:

- "The Gypsy Cried" (song), a 1962 hit song by American singer-songwriter Lou Christie
- "The Gypsy Cried", a 1989 episode of Married... with Children
