= The Hounds (band) =

Swedish pop band formed in 1965

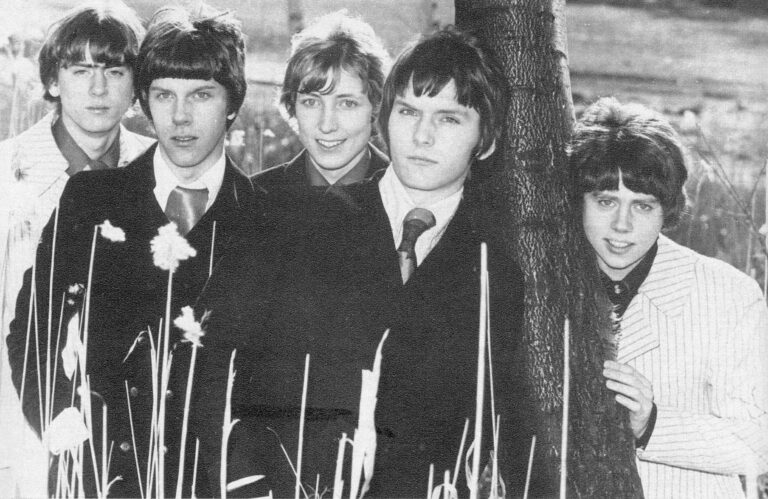
- The Hounds in 1968; Left to right: Jan Önnerud, Lasse Wallander, Jan Ahlén, Henrik Salander and Jan Bråthe

Background information
- Origin: Stockholm, Sweden
- Genres: Pop rock
- Works: Albums and singles
- Years active: 1965–1968
- Labels: Gazell; Jet; Telefunken
- Past members: Jan Ahlén; Jan Bråthe; Henrik Salander; Lasse Wallander; Jan Önnerud

The Hounds were a Swedish pop band, formed in the summer of 1965 by vocalist Jan "Janne" Ahlén, bassist Jan "Janne" Bråthe, drummer Jan "Janne" Önnerud and guitarists Henrik Salander and Lasse Wallander. Musically, they had an orientation towards pop rock with emphasis on harmony vocals. The group released one single on Telefunken and an EP on the experimental label Jet before being signed to Gazell. Between November 1966 and April 1968, the Hounds were one of Sweden's most popular pop groups, with six of their singles reaching the Tio i Topp chart. Five of them also charted on the sales chart Kvällstoppen. The group released two studio albums on Gazell, The Lion Sleeps Tonight and From the Hounds with Love in 1967.

In 1967, they starred in the film Drra på – kul grej på väg till Götet together with pop groups Lee Kings, Ola & the Janglers, the Shanes and the Spotnicks. The Hounds performed their final gig in September 1968, after which they disbanded to pursue separate interests; Önnerud aimed for a solo career, where he got several charting hits on Svensktoppen and Kvällstoppen. Ahlén formed a duo together with Ronny Roswall and toured the folk parks with Henry Darrow. Wallander became an audio engineer whilst Bråthe continued performing in the Moonlighters. Henrik Salander became an ambassador for the United Nations and was the secretary-general for their Weapons of Mass Destruction Commission.

== Discography ==
- The Lion Sleeps Tonight (1967)
- From the Hounds with Love (1967)
