= I Adore Him =

Single by The Angels

from the album A Halo to You My Boyfriend's Back
- B-side: "Thank You and Goodnight"
- Released: October 1963
- Genre: Pop
- Length: 2:30
- Label: Smash Records 1854
- Songwriter(s): Artie Kornfeld, Jan Berry
- Producer(s): Bob Feldman, Jerry Goldstein, Richard Gottehrer

The Angels singles chronology
"Cotton Fields" (1963)	"I Adore Him" (1963)	"Thank You and Goodnight" (1963)

"I Adore Him" is a song written by Artie Kornfeld and Jan Berry and performed by The Angels. The song was produced by Bob Feldman, Jerry Goldstein, and Richard Gottehrer and arranged by Alan Lorber.

== Chart performance ==
"I Adore Him" reached #13 on the R&B chart and #25 on the Billboard Hot 100 in 1963.
