= Mark Hewins =

British jazz guitarist

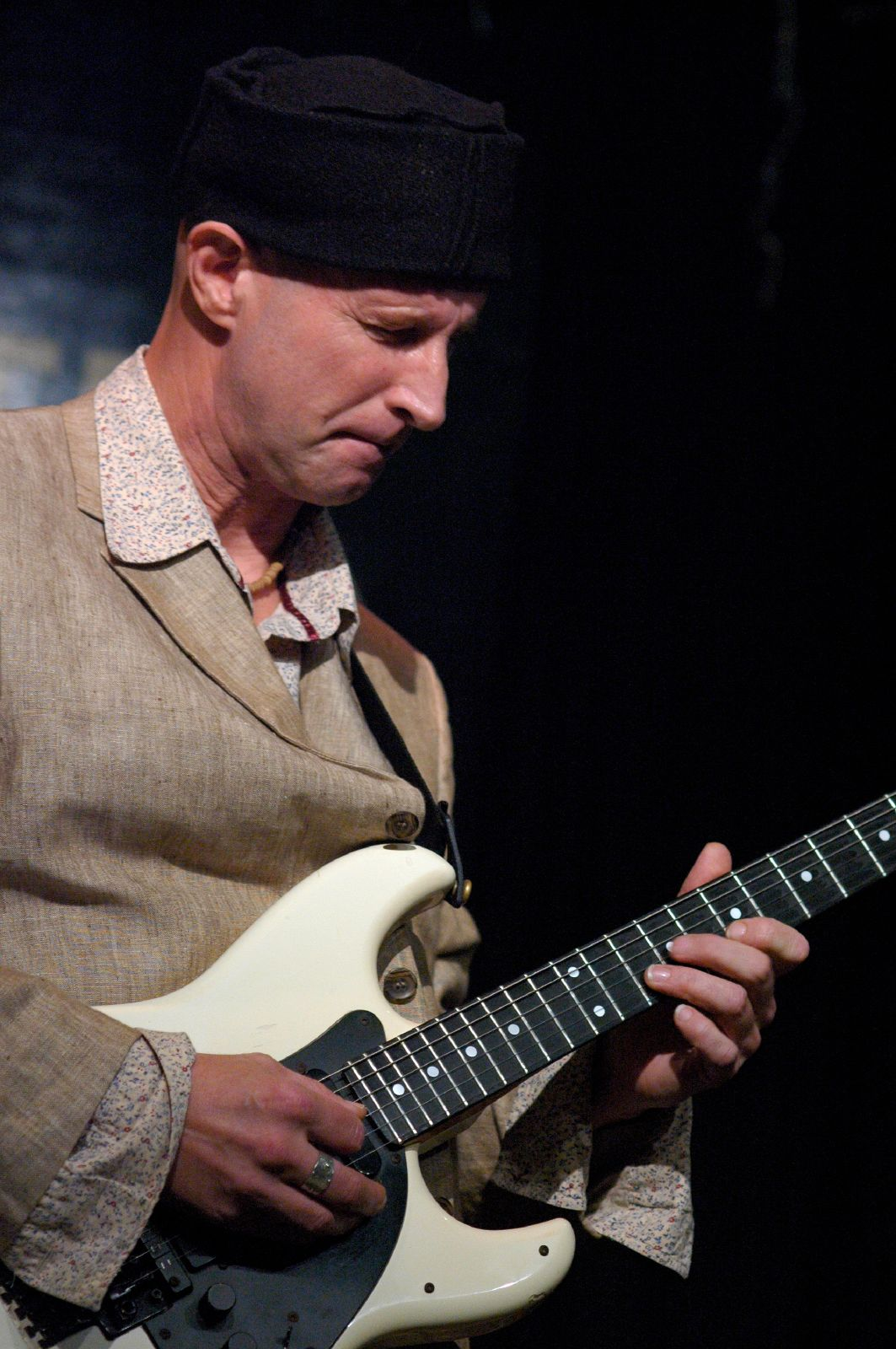
- Hewins in 2007.

Background information
- Born: 24 March 1955 (age 70)
- Origin: Canterbury
- Genres: Jazz rock, progressive rock
- Occupation: Musician
- Instrument: Guitar
- Years active: 1973–present
- Labels: Daagnim; Musart Services; Impetus; MoonJune
- Member of: FF; Tritonik; the Music Doctors
- Formerly of: Mother Sun; John Stevens Dance Orchestra; Going Going; Caravan of Dreams; Soft Heap; Gong; Dark Horse; Mashu; The Polite Force; Research; Curfew

Mark Hewins (born 24 March 1955) is an English guitarist known for his connections to the Canterbury scene, a group of English progressive rock musicians during the 1960s.

== Biography ==
Hewins' professional career as a guitarist began in 1973 with the London band Mother Sun with Steve Tozer and lead singer Dave Bell. Early work included on the Dance Orchestra's A Luta Continua (alongside Phil Collins, John Martyn, and Danny Thompson).

Hewins has worked extensively with various Canterbury scene musicians, including multiple projects with Elton Dean. He played on Dave Sinclair's Moon Over Man album and with him in The Polite Force (1976-8, Canterbury Knights album). He was in Going Going (1990) and Caravan of Dreams (1991) with Richard Sinclair. Hewins played in later incarnations of Soft Heap (with Dean, Pip Pyle and John Greaves) and can be heard on A Veritable Centaur. He was a member of Gong in 1999. Hewins has also worked extensively with Hugh Hopper, including in Dark Horse and Mashu (1995-8). Hewins also worked with Mashu percussionist Shyamal Maïtra on other projects, including a duo and a trio with Carol Grimes.

He has collaborated with Dennis Gonzalez and Andrew Cyrille in the U.S. and in Europe with Django Bates in Research. Hewins' first solo album was The Electric Guitar (1987). He was Lou Reed's guitar tech on several tours.

He leads his big band FF, his dance band Tritonik (with Tania Evans, who went on to Culture Beat), and the Music Doctors (with Dean and Lol Coxhill). He has played with Julie Felix, Bill Bruford, Fred Frith, Joe Lee Wilson, Dudu Pukwana, John Stevens, Mervyn Africa, and Anthony Aiello. He has also written music for film and television commercials.

== Discography ==
=== Solo albums ===
- 1989: The Electric Guitar (Daagnim Records)
- 1994: Provocative Thought - Live At The Vortex (Musart Services), with Hugh Hopper
- 1995: Adreamor (Impetus Records), with Hugh Hopper
- 1999: Big Big Spaces: Transmissions From Intergalactic Space (Online Mp3 album)
- 2001: Bar Torque (Moonjune Records), with Elton Dean
- 2002: Guerilla Music (Burning Shed Records), with Theo Travis

=== Collaborations ===
With Research

- 1987: Social Systems (Dossier)
- 2000: The Perpetual City (Impetus Records)

With John Stevens Dance Orchestra

- 1994: A Luta Continua (Konnex Records)

With Soft Heap

- 1995: A Veritable Centaur (Impetus Records)

With Mashu

- 1996: Elephants In Your Head? (Voiceprint)

With Polite Force

- 1996: Canterbury Knights (Voiceprint)
