= The Delicates =

American three-girl vocal group

- Origin: Belleville, New Jersey, U.S.
- Genre: pop
- Years active: 1958–present
- Labels: United Artists, London, Roulette,
- Past members: Peggy Santiglia; Denise Ferri (deceased); Arleen Lanzotti (deceased)
- Website: www.thedelicates.com

The Delicates, were an American three-girl singing group, made up of members Denise Ferri, Arleen Lanzotti, and Peggy Santiglia. The group was formed in 1958 while all three members were attending Elementary School No. Eight, in Belleville, New Jersey, United States.

== History ==
The group started out at the Brill Building in New York City, under the management of Ted Eddy (born Ted Eddy Simonetti; 1902–1985), who also served as manager of Louis Prima. They recorded for Tender, Unart, United Artists, and Roulette.

In 1959, the group released a song they had written, "Black and White Thunderbird", on the United Artists Unart label. The record was produced by Don Costa, and arranged by Billy Mure. It became a significant hit on the East Coast, which afforded them a guest spot on American Bandstand in Philadelphia. They were introduced to New York legendary DJ Murray the K. They wrote and recorded his legendary "Submarine Race Watcher's Theme". The Delicates were the "Original Dancing Girls" (1958).

The Delicates appeared on many TV shows, including; American Bandstand, Alan Freed Big Beat, Connecticut Bandstand, The Buddy Deane Show, The Clay Cole Show The Brooklyn Fox 10-day shows as well as the Brooklyn Paramount 10-day shows. They also opened for Connie Francis many times. In 1961/62 they toured with Clay Cole's "Twistorama" replacing the Ronettes. Also on that tour were The Capris and Lou Dana and the Furies.

The Delicates sang on many commercials and their first backup singing experience was for Al Martino singing "Journey to Love" written by Teddy Randazzo and produced by Don Costa. The girls went on to do lucrative backup session work, later teaming up with Bernadette Carroll, backing artists such as Connie Francis, Neil Sedaka, Patty Duke, Frankie Valli, Jose Feliciano, Kitty Kallen, Frankie Lymon, and most notably Lou Christie; Lou Christie's MGM hits including "Rhapsody in the Rain", "Painter", "Trapeze", and his No. 1 hit "Lightnin' Strikes".

On October 8,9 and 10, 2013, the Delicates were honored in their hometown of Belleville and inducted into "The Belleville Wall Of Recognition." There is now a plaque on the wall of Belleville High next to that of Connie Francis. The auditorium in Number 8 grammar school was renamed "The Delicates Auditorium" and part of Union Avenue was named "The Delicates Drive." Denise lived on Union Ave., and her family owned "Lou's Deli" which is where the girls got their name.

Arleen Lanzotti (born January 20, 1944, in Newark, New Jersey; later known as Arleen Gonnella) died on May 29, 2017, at her home in Chatham, New Jersey. She was 73. Denise Ferri (born June 2, 1944) died on October 29, 2020, at her home in Boca Raton, Florida. She was 76.
