= My Boyfriend's Back (song) =

- Side-A label of the US 7-inch vinyl single

Single by the Angels

from the album My Boyfriend's Back
- B-side: "(Love Me) Now"
- Released: July 1, 1963
- Studio: Associated Sound Studios, New York City
- Genre: Pop
- Length: 2:14 (45 version); 2:36 (extended version)
- Label: Smash
- Songwriters: Bob Feldman; Jerry Goldstein; Richard Gottehrer
- Producers: Feldman, Goldstein and Gottehrer

The Angels singles chronology
"Everybody Loves a Lover" (1962)	"My Boyfriend's Back" (1963)	"Cotton Fields" (1963)

"My Boyfriend's Back" is a song by the American girl group, the Angels. It was written by the songwriting team of Bob Feldman, Jerry Goldstein and Richard Gottehrer (a.k.a. FGG Productions who later formed the group the Strangeloves) and released as a single on July 1, 1963. The track was originally intended as a demo for the Shirelles, but ended up being released as recorded. The single spent three weeks at No. 1 on the Billboard Hot 100 chart, and reached No. 2 on the R&B chart.

== Description ==
The song is a word of warning to a would-be suitor who, after being rebuffed by the female narrator of the song, spread nasty rumors accusing her of romantic indiscretions. Now, the narrator declares, her boyfriend is back in town and ready to settle the score, and she warns the rejected admirer to watch himself.

Other musicians on the record include Herbie Lovelle on drums, Billy Butler, Bobby Comstock, and Al Gorgoni on guitar, and Bob Bushnell overdubbing on an electric and an upright bass. This song also features a young Ronnie Dio on the trumpet. Feldman, Goldstein & Gottehrer also wrote and produced some of Dio's early work with the band Ronnie Dio & The Prophets.

The song begins with a spoken recitation from the lead singer that goes: "He went away, and you hung around, and bothered me every night. And when I wouldn't go out with you, you said things that weren't very nice".

An extended version of the song, which has appeared on a few compilations in stereo, features (after the final verse) the line: "Hey, I can see him comin'/Now, you better start a-runnin'", before an instrumental repeat of the bridge section and a repeat of a line from the final verse ("My boyfriend's back/He's gonna save my reputation"), and, finally, the coda section and fade out.

The inspiration for the song came from co-writer Bob Feldman, who overheard a conversation between a high school girl and the boy she was rebuffing.

Cash Box described it as "a handclappin’ mashed-potatoes-styled delighter...that can bust wide open in no time flat" and praised the arrangement by Leroy Glover.

Billboard named the song No. 24 on their list of 100 Greatest Girl Group Songs of All Time.

== Notable cover versions ==
"My Boyfriend's Back" has been the subject of several notable cover versions.

Rival girl groups the Chiffons and Martha and the Vandellas recorded covers shortly after the Angels' original release. In 1983, Melissa Manchester released a faithful cover version as a single that reached No. 33 on the Adult Contemporary chart.

Later in 1963, Bobby Comstock and the Counts issued an answer record titled "Your Boyfriend's Back" which peaked at No. 98 in the U.S.

== Parodies, features and references ==
Humorist Dave Barry is fond of this song, and often references it in his books and columns. In one essay, he says that if he were the President of the United States, "My Boyfriend's Back" would replace "Hail to the Chief" as his arrival song.

A 1993 teen horror comedy originally intended to be titled "Johnny Zombie" (in reference to the 1961 song "Johnny Angel") had the title changed to My Boyfriend's Back just before release. Despite the title, the film is about a teenage boy coming back as a zombie in order to date the girl he's been in love with since childhood. The film was not a success, but features early appearances by actors such as Philip Seymour Hoffman, Matthew McConaughey, and Matthew Fox.

A made-for-television film also named My Boyfriend's Back was also produced for NBC. The film featured The Bouffants, a thinly veiled fictional version of The Angels, so much so that lead singer Peggy Santiglia surmised that someone who had known her personally must have consulted on the script. She later remarked that she disliked the film, noting that no one in the group had been approached about it and that if they had asked properly, they would have provided far more interesting details. The song also appears in the musical and film Jersey Boys, which she remarked was a far more realistic portrayal.

A parody of the song lyrics was sung by characters of The Office (US) in Season 8 – Episode 21 "Angry Andy".

Episode 30 of the podcast Cum Town starts with co-host Stavros Halkias singing a parody version called "My Boyfriend's Black".

Since 1988, advertising campaigns for Hess Corporation have used a jingle that parodies the song in the commercials during the Christmas season for its toys. (“The Hess Truck's back and it's better than ever...”)

== Charts ==
Chart (1963)	Peak position
Canada (CHUM Chart)	2
New Zealand (Listener)	1
UK Singles (Official Charts)	50
US Billboard Hot 100	1
US Hot R&B Singles (Billboard)	2
