= The Polite Force (band) =

British progressive rock band

The Polite Force was a British progressive rock band in the Canterbury scene from 1976 to 1978. The name comes from the 1971 Egg album of the same name.

The band was formed by Mark Hewins (guitar), Max Metto (sax), Graham Flight (bass), and Vince Clarke (drums) after about two years of recording sessions for an album by Caravan keyboardist Dave Sinclair which was unreleased until 1993 when it appeared under the title Moon Over Man. For about one year, Sinclair was also a Polite Force member.

The Polite Force performed with guest musicians such as Tony Coe, Richard Sinclair, Geoff Richardson, Richard Coughlan and Jan Schelhaas of Caravan, Andrew Latimer and Andy Ward of Camel. They recorded demos that were unreleased until 1997 when Voiceprint released some of them on the album Polite Force: Canterbury Knights.

== Discography ==
- Canterbury Knights (released 1997, recorded 1976–7) (Dutch Wikipedia)

== References and sources ==
- The Polite Force in the Dutch Wikipedia
