= My Boyfriend's Back (album) =

Studio album by the Angels
- Released: September 1963
- Recorded: 1963
- Genre: Pop
- Label: Smash
- Producer: Robert Feldman, Jerry Goldstein, Richard Gottehrer

The Angels chronology
And the Angels Sing (1962)	My Boyfriend's Back (1963)	A Halo to You (1964)

Singles from My Boyfriend's Back
- 1. "My Boyfriend's Back" Released: July 1963; 2. "Thank You and Goodnight" Released: November 1963

My Boyfriend's Back is the second studio album released by the American pop girl group the Angels. It was issued on the Smash Records label in September 1963. The album was produced by Robert Feldman, Jerry Goldstein, and Richard Gottehrer. It features the Angels' biggest hit, "My Boyfriend's Back", which reached number one on the Billboard Hot 100. Composed by the team of Bob Feldman, Jerry Goldstein, and Richard Gottehrer, "My Boyfriend's Back" sold over one million copies, and was awarded a gold disc.

== Overview ==
Peggy Santiglia was by this time the lead singer of the Angels although the album included the group's first hit "Till" originally recorded in 1961 with the group's previous lead singer, Linda Jansen. It is unspecified if the track was re-recorded with Santiglia on lead or not. There is also a cover version of "He's So Fine" performed by The Chiffons and a reading of "Someday My Prince Will Come" from the 1937 film Snow White and the Seven Dwarfs. The album sold well enough to chart at number 33 on Billboard 200, making it the group's most successful effort.

== Track listing ==
=== Side 1 ===
1. "My Boyfriend's Back" (Bob Feldman, Jerry Goldstein, Richard Gottehrer) – 2:13
2. "Someday My Prince Will Come" (Frank Churchill, Larry Morey) – 2:23
3. "Has Anybody Seen My Boyfriend" (Feldman, Goldstein, Marty Sanders, Gottehrer) – 2:00
4. "'Til" (Carl Sigman, Charles Danvers) – 2:30
5. "The Night Has a Thousand Eyes" (Benjamin Weisman, Dorothy Wayne, Marilyn Garrett) – 2:26
6. "Why Don't the Boy Leave Me Alone" (Robert Spencer) – 2:08

=== Side 2 ===
1. "He's So Fine" (Ronnie Mack) – 1:51
2. "Thank You and Goodnight" (Feldman, Goldstein, Sanders, Gottehrer) – 2:30
3. "The Hurdy-Gurdy Man" (Feldman, Goldstein, Gottehrer) – 2:30
4. "World Without Love" (Feldman, Goldstein, Gottehrer) – 2:21
5. "(Love Me) Now" (Feldman, Goldstein, Gottehrer) – 1:53
6. "The Guy with the Black Eye" (Feldman, Goldstein, Gottehrer, Robert Kalina) – 2:23

== Personnel ==
- Peggy Santiglia - lead vocals
- Barbara Allbut - backing vocals
- Phyllis Allbut - backing vocals
- Patricia Bennett, Barbara Lee, and Sylvia Peterson - backing vocals on "He's So Fine"
- Ronnie Dio - trumpet on "My Boyfriend's Back"

== Singles history ==
- "My Boyfriend's Back" b/w "(Love Me) Now" (U.S. #1)
- "Thank You and Goodnight" (U.S. #84)

== Charts ==
Chart (1963)	Peak position
US Billboard Top LPs	33
