= Max E. Youngstein =

American film producer (1913–1997)

Max E. Youngstein (March 21, 1913, New York City – July 8, 1997) was an American film producer who worked for United Artists, where he formed United Artists Music and United Artists Records. He later became an independent film producer.

== Biography ==
Youngstein was educated at Fordham University in New York and Brooklyn Law School. He became the assistant director of Advertising and Publicity for 20th Century Fox in 1941. In 1945, he created a Publicity and Promotion Department for the United States Treasury.

After the war he worked for Stanley Kramer Productions then joined Eagle-Lion Films as a vice-president where he met Arthur Krim. In 1949, he became a vice-president of Paramount Pictures.

In 1951, Youngstein joined Arthur Krim, Robert Benjamin, Arnold Picker and Bill Heineman in purchasing the then financially troubled United Artists studio from Charles Chaplin and Mary Pickford. None of the individuals placed their name on the studio's product.

Retiring from United Artists in 1962, Youngstein formed his own production company, producing films such as Fail Safe (1964), The Money Trap (1965) and Welcome to Hard Times (1967).
