= Twyla Herbert =

American songwriter (1921–2009)

- Born: Twila Moody; July 27, 1921; Riverside, California, U.S.
- Died: July 11, 2009 (aged 87) Phoenix, Arizona
- Genres: Pop
- Occupation: Songwriter
- Instrument: Piano

Twyla Herbert (born Twila Moody; July 27, 1921 – July 11, 2009) was an American songwriter known for her long songwriting partnership with the singer Lou Christie.

== Beginnings ==
Twila Moody was born in Riverside, California, and as a child moved with her parents to Pennsylvania, where she married Earle Herbert (d.1982). In the late 1950s, Lou Christie was 15 years old when he met Herbert, a "bohemian gypsy, psychic, and former concert pianist," at an audition in a church basement in his hometown, Glenwillard, Pennsylvania. Over 20 years older than he was, with flaming red hair, she was a self-described clairvoyant and mystic who allegedly predicted which of their songs would become hits.

== Collaboration ==
The pair co-wrote the great majority of Christie's hits, including "The Gypsy Cried", "Two Faces Have I", "Rhapsody in the Rain", "She Sold Me Magic", and most famously, "Lightnin' Strikes", a song later covered by such artists as Del Shannon and Klaus Nomi. Christie discussed their songwriting relationship: "Twyla is a genius. She was going to be a concert pianist but we started writing rock 'n' roll. The hardest part was that we had too many ideas. If we wanted to write a song, it would never stop."

Herbert and Christie also composed for his backup singers, a girl group named the Tammys, a handful of songs, including the eccentric single, "Egyptian Shumba," which with its over-the-top, savage vocals and faux-Middle Eastern melody, has become a cult classic.

Herbert died in Phoenix, Arizona in 2009, at the age of 87.
