= United Artists Records =

American record label

- Parent company: United Artists (1957–1978); EMI (1978–1979); Thorn EMI (1979–1980)
- Founded: 1957; 69 years ago
- Founder: Max E. Youngstein
- Defunct: September 1980; 45 years ago
- Status: Closed; absorbed into Liberty Records
- Distributor: Self-distributed
- Genre: Various
- Country of origin: United States
- Location: New York City, New York, U.S. Los Angeles, California, U.S. London, England, UK

United Artists Records was an American record label founded by Max E. Youngstein of United Artists in 1957 to issue movie soundtracks. The label expanded into other genres, such as easy listening, jazz, pop, and R&B.

== History ==
=== Genres ===
In 1958, United Artists released an album of music from the film The Big Country, for which composer Jerome Moross received an Academy Award nomination.

In 1959, United Artists released Forest of the Amazons, a cantata by Brazilian composer Heitor Villa-Lobos adapted from the music he composed for MGM's Green Mansions, with the composer conducting the Symphony of the Air. Brazilian soprano Bidu Sayão was the featured soloist on the unusual recording, which was released on both LP and reel-to-reel tape.

United Artists releases included soundtracks and cover versions from the James Bond movies, It's a Mad, Mad, Mad, Mad World (1963), A Hard Day's Night starring the Beatles (1964), The Greatest Story Ever Told (1965), A Funny Thing Happened on the Way to the Forum (1966), Fiddler on the Roof (1971), and Man of La Mancha (1972). The soundtrack album of United Artists's West Side Story (1961) was released by Columbia Records, which had also released the Broadway cast album. Also, the American version of the soundtrack album of United Artists's Help! (1965), also starring the Beatles, was released on Capitol Records.

As Henry Mancini was signed to RCA Victor, that company handled the soundtracks of the United Artists films that he composed the music for, most notably The Pink Panther; exceptions include Gaily, Gaily, The Hawaiians, The Pink Panther Strikes Again and Revenge of the Pink Panther. Many of these soundtracks have reverted to Metro-Goldwyn-Mayer, whose MGM Music unit licensed them to other labels for reissue, first Rykodisc, then Universal Music and EMI. As owner of Columbia and RCA Victor, Sony released the West Side Story original cast album and film soundtrack on CD. Sony has owned most of Mancini's soundtrack albums since its music division's merger with BMG in 2004.

An earlier version of the United Artists Records logo used from 1960 through 1968

From 1959, the label released rock and roll and R&B hits by the Clovers, Marv Johnson, the Falcons, the Exciters, Patty Duke, the Delicates, Bobby Goldsboro, Jay and the Americans, Manfred Mann, and the Easybeats. Berry Gordy placed a number of early Motown acts with United Artists, including Marv Johnson and Eddie Holland. Jerry Leiber and Mike Stoller were hired to produce The Exciters, Bobby Goldsboro, Jay and the Americans, the Clovers, and Mike Clifford. United Artists covered folk music when it added Gordon Lightfoot to its roster and easy listening with the addition of Ferrante & Teicher.

United Artists had a significant involvement with jazz. In 1960, Alan Douglas was hired to run the jazz division. Other producers included George Wein, Jack Lewis, and Tom Wilson. United Artists released jazz albums by Count Basie, Art Blakey, Ruby Braff, Betty Carter, Teddy Charles, Kenny Dorham, Mose Allison, Duke Ellington, Art Farmer, Bud Freeman, Curtis Fuller, Benny Golson, Billie Holiday, Milt Jackson, Dave Lambert, Booker Little, Howard McGhee, Gerry Mulligan, Oliver Nelson, Herb Pomeroy, Bill Potts, Zoot Sims, Rex Stewart, Billy Strayhorn, and the Modern Jazz Quartet. Many of the album covers were designed by Frank Gauna.

In 1966, the Solid State division was begun, recording several albums by The Thad Jones/Mel Lewis Orchestra. Other subsidiary labels were Unart, Ascot, United Artists Jazz, Musicor (United Artists was half owner of the company from 1960 to 1964 before selling in 1965, Ultra Audio (an audiophile label), UA Latino (Spanish-language music,) and Veep. Unart was created in 1958 for singles by vocal groups but ceased operations in 1959. It was reinstated in 1967 for budget albums.

In 1966 United Artists acquired the masters of Sue Records, an R&B and soul record label in New York City which produced Ike & Tina Turner, Baby Washington, and Jimmy McGriff. Some material produced by Sue was reissued on Unart.

United Artists produced a series of children's records under the "Tale Spinners for Children" name throughout the 1960s. These were album-length adaptations of classic fairy tales and children's stories presented as audio dramas.

=== Other UA labels ===
United Artists Special Projects were budget records designed for product and movie tie-ins. Examples are The Incredible World of James Bond, an album sold by Pepsi Cola and Frito Lay of cover version themes and original soundtrack music of the first three James Bond films, and Music from Marlboro Country, various cover versions of the theme to The Magnificent Seven and original soundtrack music from Elmer Bernstein's Return of the Seven that was sold by Philip Morris as a tie-in to its Marlboro cigarette brand.

=== Merger ===
United Artists Records used this logo from 1968 to 1971 when it was co-owned with Liberty Records.

In 1969, United Artists merged with co-owned Liberty Records and its subsidiary, Imperial Records. In 1971, Liberty/UA Records dropped the Liberty name in favor of United Artists.

Mainstream pop acts were signed to the label, among them Traffic, the Spencer Davis Group, Peter Sarstedt, Ferrante & Teicher, Shirley Bassey, and War. The label attempted to update the style of 1950s rock group Bill Haley & His Comets with a 1968 single. After UA bought Mediarts Records, the roster grew to include Don McLean, Merrilee Rush, Paul Anka, Chris Rea, Bobby Womack, Dusty Springfield, Bill Conti, Northern Calloway, Johnny Rivers, Ike & Tina Turner, Gerry Rafferty, and Crystal Gayle. Later, through a distribution deal with Jet Records, Electric Light Orchestra was signed. UA also distributed the otherwise-independent Grateful Dead Records in the early-to-mid 1970s.

In England, Andrew Lauder, who had been head of A&R at the UK branch of Liberty Records, transferred to UA when Liberty was shut down in 1971. His signings included the Groundhogs, Aynsley Dunbar (only in the UK), Hawkwind, Bonzo Dog Band, Brinsley Schwarz, Man (all originally Liberty artists), High Tide, Help Yourself, Dr. Feelgood, the Buzzcocks, the Stranglers and 999. He also licensed UK releases for several influential German bands during the early 70s, the best known of which were Can, Neu! and Amon Düül II. Lauder left UA in late 1977 to help found Radar Records.

The label's most commercially successful artist was Kenny Rogers who signed to UA in the mid-1970s, enjoying a long string of hit singles and albums.

In the mid-to-late 1970s, the company was known as United Artists Music and Records Group (UAMARG).

=== Sale to EMI ===
In 1978, UA executives Artie Mogull and Jerry Rubinstein bought the record company from Transamerica with a loan from EMI, which took over distribution of the label. The official name of the company was changed to Liberty/United Records, but the United Artists Records name was retained under license. The deal led to an immediate setback, as the change of ownership allowed Jet Records to end its relationship with UA and switch its distribution to CBS Records, with the Jet back catalog transferring to CBS distribution as well. UA dumped many ELO albums into the cutout market, which CBS was unable to prevent. However, CBS reissues of early ELO albums through Out of the Blue (1977) contained copyright notices for United Artists Music and Records Group. Unable to generate enough income to cover the loan, Liberty/United Records was sold to EMI in 1979 for $3 million and assumed liabilities of $32 million.

EMI dropped the United Artists name in 1980 and revived the Liberty label for releases by artists who had been signed to UA. This incarnation of Liberty Records operated between 1980 and about 1986, when it was deactivated and its artists assigned to other EMI labels.

Many albums from the United Artists Records catalog were reissued on Liberty during these years. Two significant exceptions were a couple of Beatles albums not previously controlled by EMI in the United States: the A Hard Day's Night (1964) soundtrack album, and Let It Be (1970). The Let It Be album was actually released by Apple Records in both the UK and the US but because the movie had been distributed by United Artists Pictures, in America the album was distributed by United Artists rather than EMI. Both previously non-EMI Beatles albums were reissued on the Capitol label, which already controlled the rest of the Beatles' catalog in the United States.

=== UAR today ===
When producer Jerry Weintraub was enlisted to revive the United Artists movie studio in 1986, he attempted to revive the United Artists Records label as well. However, only one album was released: the soundtrack for The Karate Kid Part II, a film Weintraub had produced for Columbia Pictures before being hired at UA. A single from the movie's soundtrack, Mancrab's "Fish for Life", was also released on United Artists Records.

The United Artists catalog is controlled by Capitol Records, now part of Universal Music Group (who also owns the non-soundtrack catalog of MGM Records, once owned by UA's current parent Metro-Goldwyn-Mayer). Capitol Records also has the rights to soundtrack albums UA Records released under license from MGM Music. The catalog of most British acts who were signed to the British branch of UA Records is today controlled by the Parlophone unit of Warner Music Group, with North American distribution by Rhino Entertainment. One exception is the band The Vapors, whose rights to their UA/Liberty recordings are owned by RT Industries, which acquired them from WMG in 2018. However, Warner's services division Alternative Distribution Alliance serves as RT's distributor.

== Roster ==
- 999
- A Band Called O
- Morris Albert
- American Flyer
- American Spring
- Amon Düül II
- The Animals (Jet)
- The Angels (Ascot)
- Paul Anka
- B. J. Arnau
- Shirley Bassey
- The Beatles (US and Canada)
- Black Widow (US)
- Brass Construction
- Brinsley Schwarz
- Buzzcocks
- Can
- Al Caiola (Ultra Audio & United Artists)
- Canned Heat
- Anita Carter
- The Clovers
- Odia Coates
- Bill Conti
- Pat Cooper
- Cornelius Brothers & Sister Rose
- Don Costa
- Country Gazette
- Curfew
- The D-Men (Veep & United Artists)
- Chris Darrow
- The Spencer Davis Group (US)
- The Delicates (Unart)
- Dr. Feelgood (UK)
- Patty Duke
- The Easybeats
- The Electric Indian
- Electric Light Orchestra (United Artists & Jet)
- Enchantment (Roadshow Records and United Artists)
- The Exciters
- The Falcons
- Family (US & Canada)
- Ferrante & Teicher (Ultra Audio & United Artists)
- Fischer-Z
- Sergio Franchi
- Connie Francis
- Crystal Gayle
- Bobby Goldsboro
- The Groundhogs
- Bill Haley & His Comets
- The Hassles
- Hawkwind
- Roy Head & the Traits (Ascot)
- Help Yourself
- LeRoy Holmes
- The Highwaymen
- Dee D. Jackson
- Jan and Dean
- Jay and the Americans
- Marv Johnson
- George Jones
- Artie Kaplan
- Deke Leonard's Iceberg
- Gordon Lightfoot
- Little Anthony and the Imperials (DCP, Veep & UA)
- Don McLean
- Sylvia McNeill
- Man
- Manfred Mann (Ascot & United Artists)
- Country Johnny Mathis
- Nathaniel Mayer
- Bobbi Martin
- George Martin
- Garnet Mimms
- Melba Montgomery
- Ennio Morricone
- Mouth & MacNeal
- The Move
- Neu! (UK)
- Maxine Nightingale
- Nitty Gritty Dirt Band (Liberty & United Artists)
- Passengers
- Joyce Paul
- Gene Pitney (Musicor)
- The Platters (Musicor)
- Popol Vuh (rest of the world)
- Mark Radice
- Gerry Rafferty
- Chris Rea
- Sharon Redd
- Del Reeves
- Waldo de los Rios
- Johnny Rivers
- Tito Rodríguez (United Artists Latino)
- Kenny Rogers
- Jimmy Roselli
- Merrilee Rush
- Jean Shepard
- Dusty Springfield (US)
- The Stranglers (except in US)
- Donna Summer
- The Tammys
- Traffic (US)
- Ike & Tina Turner
- The Vapors
- The Ventures
- War (Far Out Productions)
- Doc Watson
- Wess and the Airedales
- Dottie West
- Whitesnake
- David Wiffen
- Bobby Womack
- Roy Wood
- Wynder K. Frog
- Frank Zappa (200 Motels soundtrack only)

== See also ==
- Liberty Records
- Blue Note Records
- Jet Records
- List of record labels
