= Peggy Santiglia =

American pop singer (born 1944)

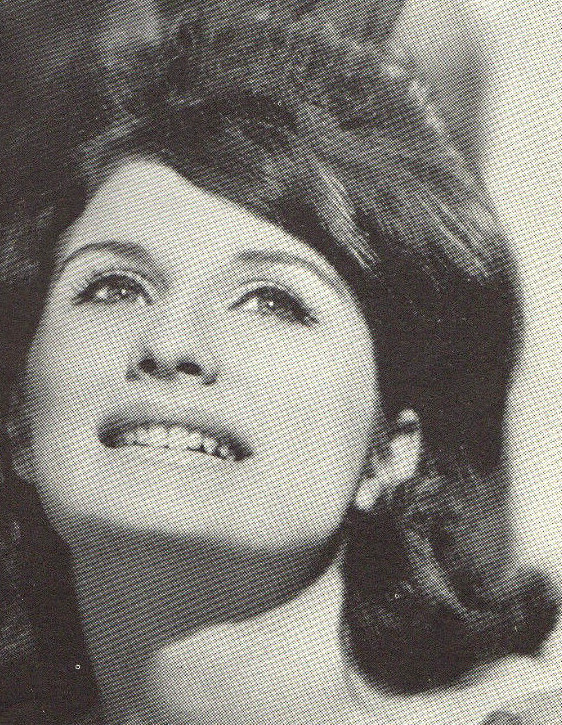
- Santiglia in 1963

Background information
- Born: Margaret Rose Santiglia; May 4, 1944 (age 82); Belleville, New Jersey, U.S.
- Genre: Pop
- Occupation: Singer
- Years active: 1958–present
- Labels: Roulette, Unart, Mercury-Smash, Polygram, Tiki, Tollie, DynoVoice, United Artists
- Website: theangelsonline.com

Margaret "Peggy" Santiglia (born May 4, 1944) is an American pop singer of the "girl group era". She is perhaps best known for the 1963 pop hit "My Boyfriend's Back" as lead singer for The Angels when she was eighteen years old.

== Biography ==
Santiglia was born in Belleville, New Jersey, to Pietro (Peter) Santiglia and Michelina (Margaret) (née Gallina) where she was raised in a musical Italian family with her two older siblings, Joseph and Anna. Pietro immigrated to the United States when he was 18, bringing with him many musical talents. An accomplished musician, Pietro played clarinet, mandolin and guitar locally and statewide in several community orchestras.

=== Career: 1950s ===
In 1958, while still in elementary school, Santiglia met childhood friends Denise Ferri and Arleen Lanzotti. At the suggestion of a teacher, the three girls performed in their school's talent show to much acclaim, and formed the all-girl group, The Delicates. Starting out at the Brill Building in New York City under the management of Ted Eddy (né Ted Eddy Simonetti; 1902–1985) (Louis Prima's manager), they recorded for the Tender, Unart, United Artists and Roulette labels.

The Delicates were most famous for writing the Murray The K theme songs, most notably "Meusurray," and "The Submarine Race Watchers Theme," and appearing at many Murray the K concerts, including several at the Brooklyn Fox Theatre.

In 1959, The Delicates released a song that they wrote called "Black and White Thunderbird" on the Unart label. Songs "Too Young to Date," "Your Happiest Years," and many others were arranged and produced by famed arranger, Don Costa for United Artists. Black and White Thunderbird became a significant hit on the East Coast, which afforded The Delicates a guest spot on American Bandstand on March 8, 1960.

=== Career: 1960s ===
Santiglia, still a senior at Belleville High School (Belleville, New Jersey), was then asked to join sisters Phyllis ("Jiggs") and Barbara ("Bibs") Allbut, replacing Linda Jansen as lead singer in The Angels in 1962 in live performances and then to record on their new label, Smash, with producers FGG. "My Boyfriend's Back" became a No. 1 hit in the summer/fall of 1963. It sold over one million copies, and was awarded a gold disc. Two albums followed the single. After their hit, The Angels frequently worked as background singers in the New York area, and Santiglia and her earlier Delicates bandmate Denise Ferri, together with solo artist (Dahlia) Bernadette Carroll, sang backup on Lou Christie's "Lightnin' Strikes." Later, Santiglia, Ferri and Carroll went on to form the group "Jessica James and the Outlaws," and recorded several songs which were produced by Bob Gaudio (of Four Seasons fame) and Bob Crewe, and arranged by Charlie Callello, including "Give Her Up, Baby," and "We'll be Makin' Out." Santiglia also recorded the single, "Come Closer" under the name of "Tiffany Michel." Additionally, under the pseudonym "Peggy Farina," she wrote the lyrics to The Four Seasons's 1967 hit single "Beggin'," with Bob Gaudio writing the music.

=== Career: 1970s ===
In the early 1970s, Santiglia was the lead vocalist for Dusk, a girl group formed by Bell Records producers Hank Medress of The Tokens and Dave Appell to expand upon their successful collaboration with Tony Orlando and Dawn. The group released three singles: "Angel Baby", "I Hear Those Church Bells Ringing" (which reached #53 on the Billboard Hot 100 Singles chart), and "Treat Me Like a Good Piece of Candy". A dance record called "Sweet, Sweet City Rhythm" was produced in 1978 by Billy Terrell under the name Fantasia featuring Peggy Santiglia for Tiki Records, the first time her actual name was used. The Angels also recorded a dance version of their earlier hit, "Till," which gained some popularity in the dance clubs during the 70's dance era.

=== Return to recording in 2008 ===
Santiglia has continued to perform in live concerts with The Angels and on television throughout the 1980s, 1990s, and 2000s. In 2008, she recorded her first album of new material with The Angels since the late 1970s (Love, The Angels).
