= Curfew (band) =

British jazz fusion band

- Origin: South England; Scotland
- Genres: Jazz rock, jazz fusion
- Years active: 1988–present
- Label: Afterdark
- Members: Steve Marshall; Martin Lawrie; Nick Andrew; Russ Wilson
- Past members: David Bouet; Theo Travis; Ed Jones; Dave O'Higgins; Mark Hewins; Alex Lawrie; Julian Costello; Shan Chana; Bill Morrison; Rena; Kev Dyson; Paul Francis; Mike Nichols; Jane Tuff
- Website: www.curfew.co.uk

Curfew are a jazz fusion band from England.

== Early years: 1988–1995 ==
Curfew were formed in 1988 by Martin Lawrie and Steve Marshall as an outlet for their jazz fusion compositions. During the next year, the band augmented their lineup with Bill Morrison on drums and Julian Costello on saxophone. After Morrison's departure in 1992, Shan Chana joined the band. With vocalist Rena, the band appeared at venues such as the Jazz Café in Camden. In the studio the band produced a number of demos which would later become the basis for their debut album.

== New line-up and album: 1995–1997 ==
With the arrival of a new drummer, Russ Wilson the band recorded their first album (Somewhere In The City) with guests Dave O'Higgins and Mark Hewins. The album was released by Afterdark Records.

== Back to basics: 2004–present ==
With only occasional session appearances from Jones and Travis (as well as Lawrie's son Alex on saxophone, flute and EWI), the band entered the studio in December 2004, before releasing Hold The Front Page in September 2005.

With Andrews preoccupied through 2006 with his solo album, the band reconvened in early 2007 for an appearance at the Watermill Jazz Club, Dorking. Shortly after this, Wilson announced his departure from the band.

On 20 July 2007 Andrews stated on his personal website that Curfew will be performing at the 2007 alloutguitarFEST (formerly Kymfest). The festival took place on 16 September at the Roadmender venue in Northampton.

Having been described in the press as "jazz rock with a Weather Report sound", the band are the self-proclaimed pioneers of the electric jazz genre; combining traditional instrumentation and performance with modern MIDI techniques.

== Personnel ==
- Martin Lawrie – keyboards
- Nick Andrew – guitar
- Steve Marshall – bass guitar, flute
- Russ Wilson – drums

== Discography ==
- Somewhere in the City – 1997
- Return of the Jazz Fusioneers – 2001
- Hold the Front Page – 2005
