= The Angels (American group) =

American girl group

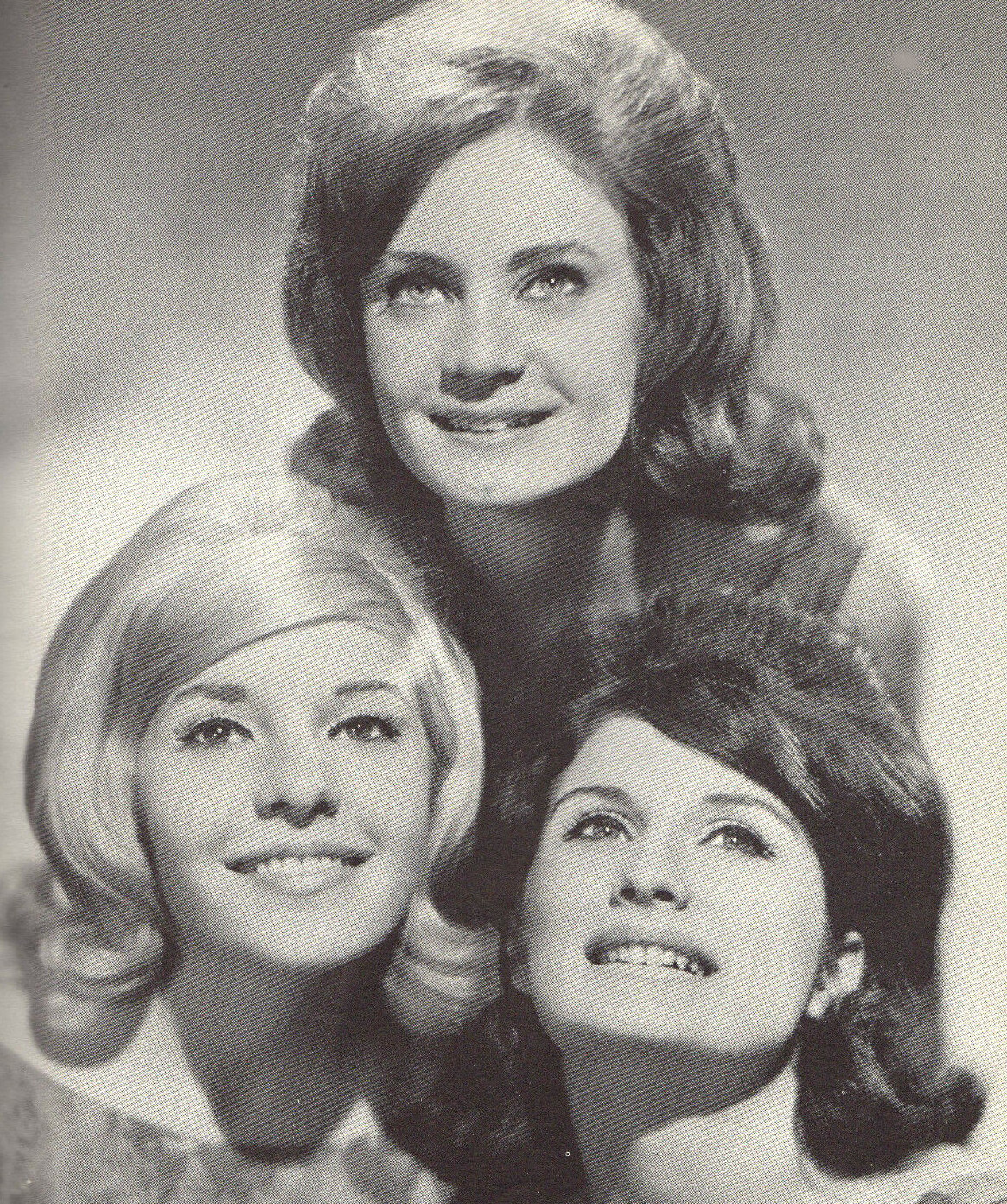
- The Angels in 1963. L-R: Phyllis Allbut, Barbara Allbut and Peggy Santiglia.

Background information
- Also known as: The Starlets, The Halos
- Origin: New Jersey, U.S.
- Years active: 1958–1969
- Labels: Caprice; Smash; RCA Victor; Polydor
- Past members: Phyllis Allbut; Peggy Santiglia; Barbara Allbut; Bernadette Carroll; Lynda Malzone Hailey; Linda (Jankowski) Jansen; Toni Mason; Debra Swisher
- Website: theangelsonline.com

The Angels were an American girl group best known for their 1963 No. 1 hit single "My Boyfriend's Back".

The Angels originated in New Jersey as the Starlets, consisting of sisters Barbara "Bibs" and Phyllis "Jiggs" Allbut, Bernadette Carroll, and Lynda Malzone. They had local hits and worked as backup singers in the studio. Linda Jansen replaced Malzone as lead singer, and the group eventually changed their name to the Angels. In 1963, they signed with Mercury Records' subsidiary Smash Records and released their biggest hit, "My Boyfriend's Back," which reached number one on the Billboard Hot 100 and sold over one million copies. The group underwent several lineup changes and disputes over their name, resulting in a temporary rebranding as the Halos. In 2005, the Angels were inducted into the Vocal Group Hall of Fame. As of 2021, Phyllis Allbut and Peggy Santiglia are the last living founding members.

== History ==
The group originated in New Jersey as the Starlets which consisted of sisters Barbara "Bibs" and Phyllis "Jiggs" Allbut, Bernadette Carroll, and Lynda Malzone. They had minor local hits and wound up doing back-up work in the studio. When Malzone left, Linda Jansen became the new lead singer. Their manager, Tom DeCillis, kept Bernadette Carroll and dropped the rest of the group. Carroll would find solo success in 1964 with her Laurie Records single "Party Girl". After a failed attempt at a record deal with producer Gerry Granahan, the Allbut sisters turned their focus to education: Phyllis was in teacher's college at the time and Barbara was accepted into the Juilliard School for her abilities as a musical arranger. Soon Granahan, who had previously rejected the group, saw hit potential in the song they had performed for him in their audition, a version of "Till", and wanted them to record it in the studio. "Till" became their first single under their new name, the Angels, and also their first hit (No. 14 US) when it was released by Granahan's Caprice label in 1962. The song was followed up with a second national hit, "Cry Baby Cry". The Angels had one album on Caprice, titled ...And the Angels Sing, in 1962.

Jansen left the group in late 1962 to go solo and was replaced by Peggy Santiglia, formerly of The Delicates (with Denise Ferri and Arleen Lanzotti). Santiglia had sung jingles for WINS Radio, appeared on Broadway, and had songwriting experience. In 1963, the trio signed to Mercury Records' subsidiary label Smash Records and began working with the Feldman-Goldstein-Gottehrer songwriting team, who wrote "My Boyfriend's Back". The Angels' performance (with Santiglia on lead) was originally intended as a demo for The Shirelles' consideration, but the music publishers chose instead to release it as it stood. The song was a major hit, reaching number one on the Billboard Hot 100. "My Boyfriend's Back" sold over one million copies, and was awarded a gold disc. The follow-up was the lower-charting "I Adore Him" (No. 25 US). The B-side "Thank You And Goodnight" charted at No. 84 US. During their Smash career, the Angels maintained a steady string of moderately successful singles which included "Wow Wow Wee (He's The Boy For Me)" (No. 41 US). Their album My Boyfriend's Back made the top forty, charting at No. 33. but their next, A Halo to You, did not chart. The group left Smash in 1964 and signed with Congress Records.

The group became the Halos, following a dispute over the ownership of the name "the Angels". Peggy Santiglia took a leave of absence from the group in 1965 and was replaced by Toni Mason. The group released several more singles, none of which charted. Mason left the group in 1967 and was replaced by Debra Swisher (previously of The Pixies Three), who had recently recorded and released her own version of "Thank You And Goodnight" on the ABC-Paramount Records subsidiary, Boom Records. This lineup resumed using the name "the Angels" and released a handful of singles on RCA Records. Former Starlet Bernadette Carroll was back in the group and became the new lead. They appeared on The Dean Martin Show before disbanding in 1968. Santiglia and Phyllis and Barbara Allbut regrouped in the early 1970s and released a new single on Polydor Records.

Phyllis Allbut and Santiglia continued to perform as the Angels, joined occasionally by Barbara Allbut.

In 2005, the Angels were inducted in the Vocal Group Hall of Fame.

Depicted by actresses, the Angels are shown singing "My Boyfriend's Back" in the 2014 film Jersey Boys, based on the Broadway hit musical about Frankie Valli and The Four Seasons. Both groups originated in New Jersey.

On October 5, 2018, former member Bernadette Carroll died at the age of 74.

On February 19, 2019, the Angels' original lead singer Linda Jansen died at the age of 74.

On July 10, 2021, founding member Barbara "Bibs" Allbut Brown died at the age of 80, leaving her sister Phyllis and Peggy as the last remaining founding members of the group still alive.

== Members ==
- Barbara "Bibs" Allbut Brown (born September 24, 1940, in Orange, New Jersey; died July 10, 2021)
- Phyllis "Jiggs" Allbut Sirico (born September 24, 1942, in Orange, New Jersey)
- Linda Jansen (born Linda Jankowski, July 7, 1944, in Newark, New Jersey; died February 19, 2019)
- Peggy Santiglia Ricker (born May 4, 1944, in Belleville, New Jersey)
- Bernadette Carroll (born Bernadette Dalia, June 21, 1944, in Elizabeth, New Jersey; died October 5, 2018, at her home in Florida)

== Discography ==
=== Albums ===
Year	Album	Peak chart positions	Record Label
Year	Album	Billboard 200	Record Label
1962	...And the Angels Sing	-	Caprice Records
1963	My Boyfriend's Back	33	Smash Records
1964	A Halo to You	-	Smash Records
2008	Love, the Angels	-	Angel Sound Records

=== Singles ===
==== The Starlets ====
Year	Title	Peak chart positions		Record Label	B-side
Year	Title	US	R&B	Record Label	B-side
1960	"P.S. I Love You"	106	—	Astro Records	"Where is My Love Tonight"
1960	"Romeo and Juliet"	—	—	Astro Records	"Listen for a Lonely Tambourine"

==== The Angels ====
Year	Title	Peak chart positions		Record Label	B-side	Album
Year	Title	US	R&B	Record Label	B-side	Album
1961	"'Til"	14	—	Caprice Records	"A Moment Ago"	And the Angels Sing
1962	"Cry Baby Cry"	38	—	Caprice Records	"That's All I Ask of You"	And the Angels Sing
1962	"Everybody Loves a Lover"	103	—	Caprice Records	"Blow, Joe"	And the Angels Sing
1962	"You Should Have Told Me"	—	—	Caprice Records	"I'd Be Good for You"	
1962	"A Moment Ago"	—	—	Caprice Records	"Cotton Fields"	And the Angels Sing
1963	"My Boyfriend's Back"	1	2	Smash Records	"(Love Me) Now"	My Boyfriend's Back
1963	"Cotton Fields"	119	—	Ascot Records	"Irresistible"	And the Angels Sing
1963	"I Adore Him" / "Thank You and Goodnight"	25; 84	13 —	Smash Records		A Halo To You; My Boyfriend's Back
1964	"Wow Wow Wee (He's the Boy for Me)"	41	—	Smash Records	"Snowflakes and Teardrops"	A Halo To You
1964	"Little Beatle Boy"	—	—	Smash Records	"Java"	A Halo To You
1964	"Dream Boy"	—	—	Smash Records	"Jamaica Joe" (Non-LP track)	A Halo To You
1964	"The Boy From 'Cross Town"	—	—	Smash Records	"World Without Love" (from My Boyfriend's Back)	Non-LP tracks
1967	"What to Do"	—	—	RCA Records	"I Had a Dream I Lost You"	Non-LP tracks
1967	"You'll Never Get to Heaven"	—	—	RCA Records	"Go Out and Play"	Non-LP tracks
1967	"You're the Cause of It"	—	—	RCA Records	"With Love"	Non-LP tracks
1968	"The Modley"	—	—	RCA Records	"If I Didn't Love You"	Non-LP tracks
1968	"The Boy with the Green Eyes"	—	—	RCA Records	"But for Love"	Non-LP tracks
1968	"Merry Go Round"	—	—	RCA Records	"So Nice"	Non-LP tracks
1974	"Poppa's Side Of The Bed"	—	—	Polydor Records	"You're All I Need to Get By"	Non-LP tracks

== Bibliography ==
- Clemente, John (2000). Girl Groups – Fabulous Females That Rocked The World. Iola, Wisconsin, Krause Publications. pp. 276. ISBN 0-87341-816-6
- Clemente, John (2013). Girl Groups – Fabulous Females Who Rocked The World. Bloomington, Indiana, Authorhouse Publications. pp. 623. ISBN 978-1-4772-7633-4 (sc); ISBN 978-1-4772-8128-4 (e)
