= Hess toys =

Toys made by the Hess Corporation

The American energy company Hess Corporation also makes toys. The company manufactures toy trucks, helicopters, police cars, airplanes, space shuttles, and rescue vehicles.

The company has sold toys for over 50 years and since 1964, Hess gas stations have sold toy trucks each year around Christmas time. Their older toys are considered collectibles.

== History ==
In 1964, Hess Oil and Chemical began making small replicas of their trucks to give to customers. The first tanker truck sold for $1.39 in 1964 and is now worth nearly $2,500.

The 2014 model was the final Hess Truck to be sold at their gas stations before transitioning to Speedway. The toy truck business continued after the sale of Hess' retail unit to Speedway. Since 2015, the Hess Toy Trucks have been made available for sale through their online website, while Speedway itself began to sell toy trucks at all of their locations at the same time, including at legacy locations in the Midwestern United States that were never part of Hess Corporation. Speedway suspended its toy truck program in 2020 due to the COVID-19 pandemic, and was discontinued altogether when 7-Eleven acquired Speedway in 2021.

== Models ==
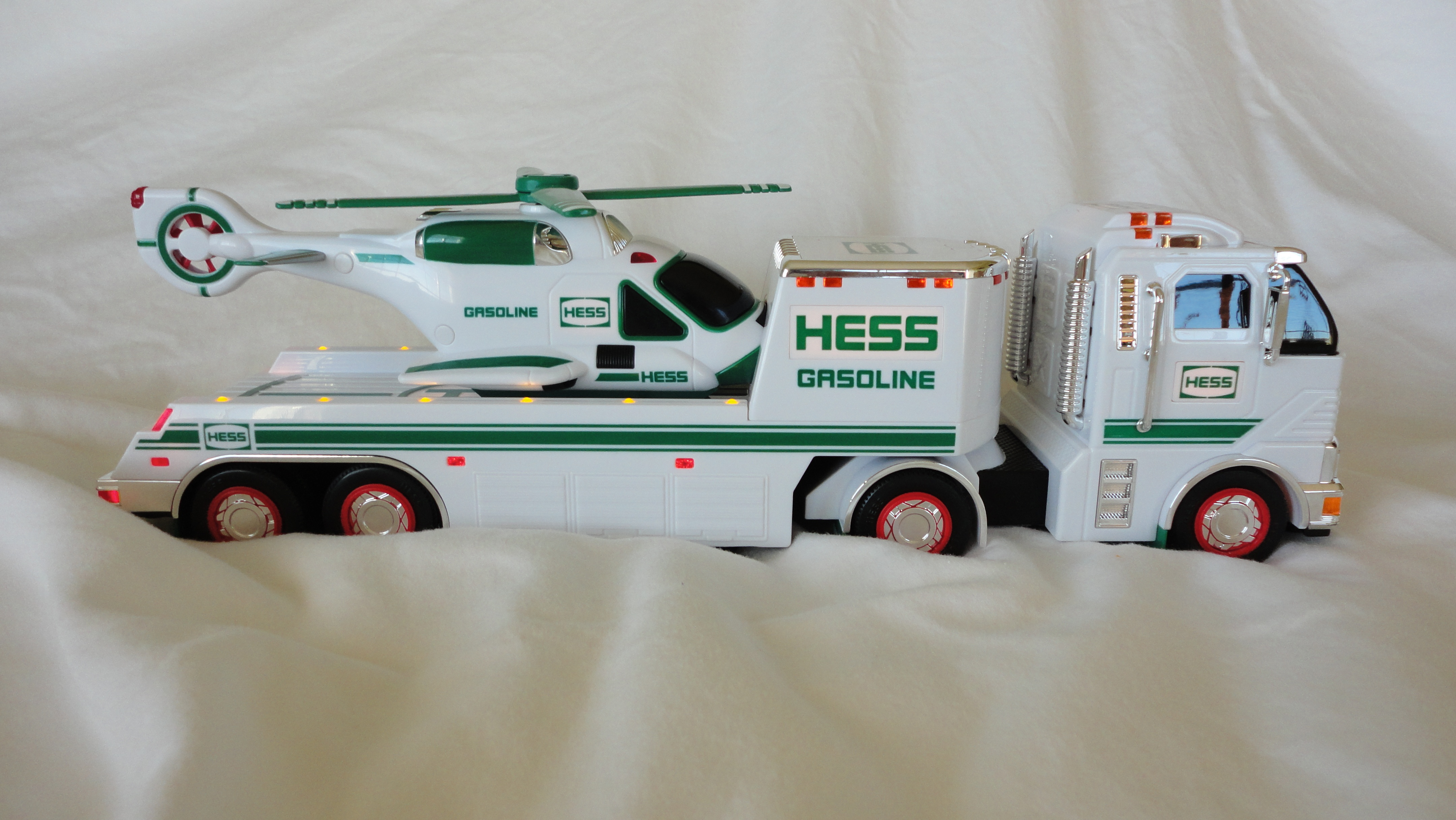
The 2006 version of the Hess Toy Truck

There have been several instances in which non-truck vehicles were sold under the Hess Toy Truck banner:

- 1966 Tanker Ship, based on the Hess Voyager.
- 1993 Patrol Car.
- 2001 Helicopter with Motorcycle and Cruiser.
- 2004 SUV with Motorcycles. This marked the 40th anniversary of the Hess Toy Truck.
- 2009 Race Car with Racer.
- 2012 Helicopter and Rescue.
- 2021 Cargo Plane and Jet.
- 2025 Stock Car Racers

=== Annual holiday releases ===
These models have been annually released for nearly every holiday season since 1964. These are the following:

- 1964–1965 Tanker Trailer.
- 1966 Tanker Ship.
- 1967 Tanker Truck. This model included a red velvet display base instead of a box bottom.
- 1968–1969 Tanker Truck. Most 1969 trucks were stamped with the office being in Woodbridge NJ instead of Perth Amboy, making 1969 trucks more valuable.
- 1970–1971 Fire Truck. They ran out of regular boxes in 1971 so they had to take plain white boxes and put a Season's Greetings sticker on top. A prototype made in 1970 in the USA and stamped, "Made in USA" on the bottom.
- 1972 Tanker Truck. This was a slightly restyled 1968–69 model.
- 1974 Tanker Truck. This marked the 10th anniversary of the Hess Toy Truck and is the same model as the 1972 release with the exception of a caution label on the box, stating there were small parts. The child safety law passed in 1973 regulated any toy with small pieces had to have a label. Also during 1974, there were leftover 1970 trucks, so they put on labels and resold them.
- 1975–1976 Box Trailer. The 1975 model had solid green barrels. The 1976 model had the HESS logo on the barrels. Also the 1975 truck had a USA prototype like the 1970.
- 1977 Fuel Oil Tanker.
- 1978 Fuel Oil Tanker. Slightly different adhesive sticker design on the back.
- 1980 Training Van. These were intended to come out in 1978, but were canceled for that year.
- 1982–1983 First Hess Truck. Some 1983s had a black switch on the bottom.
- 1984 Fuel Oil Tanker with Bank. This marked the 20th anniversary of the Hess Toy Truck.
- 1985 First Hess Truck Bank.
- 1986 Red Fire Truck.
- 1987 Truck with Barrels.
- 1988 Truck with Racer.
- 1989 White Fire Truck Bank. Similar to the 1986 Hess Fire Truck. Final model to include a built-in coin bank.
- 1990 Tanker Truck. The last annual holiday tanker truck to be released. Tanker truck releases after 1990 have either been miniatures or commemorative edition models.
- 1991 Truck with Racer.
- 1992 18 wheeler & Racer.
- 1993 Patrol Car. This is the first toy car made by Hess.
- 1994 Rescue Truck. This marked the 30th anniversary of the Hess Toy Truck.
- 1995 Truck with Helicopter.
- 1996 Emergency Truck.
- 1997 Truck with Racers.
- 1998 RV with Motorcycle & Sand Buggy.
- 1999 Truck & Space Shuttle.
- 2000 Fire Truck.
- 2001 Helicopter with Motorcycle & Cruiser.
- 2002 Truck with Airplane.
- 2003 Truck with Race Cars.
- 2004 SUV with Motorcycles. This marked the 40th anniversary of the Hess Toy Truck.
- 2005 Emergency Truck with Rescue Vehicle.
- 2006 Truck & Helicopter.
- 2007 Monster Truck with Motorcycles.
- 2008 Truck with Front End Loader.
- 2009 Race Car & Racer.
- 2010 Truck & Jet.
- 2011 Truck with Race Car.
- 2012 Helicopter & Rescue.
- 2013 Truck with Tractor.
- 2014 Truck with Space Cruiser & Scout. This marked the 50th anniversary of the Hess Toy Truck and was the final year the Hess truck was sold at their gas stations.
- 2015 Fire Truck & Ladder Rescue. This was sold online and at select mall kiosks in New York, New Jersey, and Pennsylvania.
- 2016 Truck with Dragster. This, and future releases are only sold online through their website.
- 2017 Dump Truck & Loader.
- 2018 RV with ATV & Motorbike.
- 2019 Tow Truck Rescue Team.
- 2020 Ambulance & Rescue.
- 2021 Cargo Plane & Jet. This marked the first Hess truck where a plane is the main vehicle.
- 2022 Flatbed Truck with Hot Rods.
- 2023 Police Truck and Cruiser.
- 2024 Fire Truck with Car and Motorcycle. This marked the 60th anniversary of the Hess Toy Truck.
- 2025 Stock Car Racers.
- 2026 Hauler Truck and Snow Plow.

=== Miniature trucks ===
From 1998 to 2014 and returning in 2017, Hess has produced a mini truck from those years as well as the regular toy trucks. These models have been usually sold in the late springtime.

- 1998 Tanker Truck related with the 1990 model.
- 1999 Red Fire Truck related with the 1986 model.
- 2000 First Hess Truck related with 1982 and 1985 models.
- 2001 Truck with Racer related with the 1991 model
- 2002 Tanker Ship related with the 1966 model.
- 2003 Patrol Car related with the 1993 model.
- 2004 Tanker Truck related with the 1964 model. This marked the 40th anniversary of the Hess Toy Truck along with the 2004 SUV with Motorcycles.
- 2005 Helicopter from the 1995 model.
- 2006 Truck with Racer related with the 1992 model.
- 2007 Rescue Truck related with the 1994 model.
- 2008 Recreational Van with Motorcycle and Cruiser related with the 1998 model. This marked the 10th anniversary of the Hess Miniature Truck fleet.
- 2009 Space Shuttle Transport related with the 1999 model.
- 2010 Fire Truck related with the 2000 model.
- 2011 Helicopter related with the 2001 model.
- 2012 Truck with Airplane related with the 2002 model.
- 2013 Truck with Racers related with the 2003 model.
- 2014 Sport Utility Vehicle related with the 2004 model. This was the last Hess miniature to be sold at Hess gas stations.
- 2017 - A boxed set of 3 vehicles were produced. the Emergency Truck related with the 2005 model, the Toy Truck and Helicopter related with the 2006 model, and the Monster Truck related with the 2007 model. This, and future releases are sold only online through their website.
- 2018 - A boxed set of 3 vehicles were produced. The fire truck related with the 1970 model, the Tanker Truck related with the 1977 model, and the Truck with Race Car related to the 1988 model. This marked the 20th anniversary of the Hess Miniature Truck fleet.
- 2019 - A boxed set of 3 vehicles were produced. The Box Trailer related with the 1975/76 model, the Emergency truck related with the 1996 model, and the Toy Truck and Race Car related with the 2011 model.
- 2020 - A boxed set of 3 vehicles were produced. The 18 Wheeler related with the 1987 model, the Race Car related with the 2009 model, and the Fire Truck and Ladder Rescue related with the 2015 model.
- 2021 - A boxed set of 3 vehicles were produced. The Tanker Truck related with the 1968-69 model, the Training Van related with the 1980 model, and the Toy Truck and Racers related with the 1997 model.
- 2022 - A boxed set of 3 vehicles were produced. The Fire Truck related with the 1989 model, the Truck and Front Loader related with the 2008 model, and the Helicopter related with the 2012 model.
- 2023 - A boxed set of 3 vehicles were produced. The Truck & Space Cruiser related with the 2014 model, the Collector's Edition Tanker Truck related with the 2014 special edition model, and the Collector's Edition First Hess Truck related with the 2018 model. This marked the 25th anniversary of the Hess Miniature Truck fleet.
- 2024 - A boxed set of 3 vehicles were produced. The Truck & Jet related with the 2010 model, the Truck and Tractor related with the 2013 model, and the Ambulance & Rescue related with the 2020 model.
- 2025 - A boxed set of 3 vehicles were produced. The Red Velvet Tanker Truck related with the 1967 model, the Truck and Helicopter related with the 1995 model, and the Truck & Dragster related with the 2016 model. This was the first Hess Miniature Truck pack to have a differently colored base.
- 2026 - A boxed set of 3 vehicles were produced. The Dump Truck and Loader related with the 2017 model, the Tow Truck related with the 2019 model, and the Police Truck related with the 2023 model.

=== Plush toys ===
- 2020 "My First Hess Truck" Fire Truck. The first plush toy in the Hess Toy Truck fleet.
- 2021 My Plush Hess Truck Cement Mixer. The second plush toy in the Hess Toy Truck fleet.
- 2022 My Plush Hess Truck Choo Choo Train. The third plush toy and the first train in the Hess Toy Truck Fleet.
- 2023 My Plush Hess Truck Tugboat. The fourth plush toy in the Hess Toy Truck fleet.
- 2024 My Plush Hess Truck School Bus. This marks the first bus in the Hess Toy Truck fleet. The fifth plush toy in the Hess Toy Truck fleet.
- 2025 My Plush Hess Truck Farm Tractor. This marks the first tractor in the Hess Toy Truck fleet. The sixth plush toy in the Hess Toy Truck fleet.
- 2026 My Plush Hess Monster Truck. The seventh plush toy in the Hess Toy Truck fleet.

=== Limited edition ===
Ever since the Hess Toy Trucks were released, Hess has privately and publicly released additional models in limited production as gifts or to commemorate anniversaries and major changes within the company.

- 1969 Amerada Hess Tanker Truck – Not a public release. It was released to commemorate the merger between Hess and The Amerada Petroleum Corporation. It has the name "Amerada Hess" on the tanker rather than the "Hess" name. This was given out to employees and executives.
- 1993 Hess Premium Diesel Tanker – Not a public release. It was released to commemorate the introduction of 93 Hess Premium Diesel with Super Detergent. It was a re-release of the 1990 tanker that included the decal "New Premium Diesel With Super Detergency" on the tanker body. It was only distributed to bulk buyers as a thank you gift.
- 1995 Truck with Helicopter Chromed – Not a public release. It is the same as the 1995 holiday release but in chrome instead of white. It was released as a gift given to employees that worked on a special project for Leon Hess.
- 2006 Hess Truck with Racers – Only released to those on the New York Stock Exchange trading floor. It commemorates the name change and stock ticker symbol change from Amerada Hess Corporation to the Hess Corporation. It was a re-release of the 1997 Hess Truck. The trailer box bears the name "Hess Corporation". The two cars included have the stock ticker letters on them instead of the traditional Hess name. One car is green and bears the letters "AHC". The other car is white and bears the letters "HES". Was only given out to those on the stock trading floor on May 9, 2006.
- 2014 Tanker Truck & Miniature 1964 Hess Truck Tanker Replica – Sold to the public. It was released to commemorate 50 years of the Hess Toy Trucks. It featured more lights than any other Hess Truck. It was also the first model to be sold on the Hess Toy Truck website. It is a uniquely designed tanker truck that contains a miniature scale model of the original 1964 Hess Tanker that is stored within the truck's tank.
- 2015 Chrome Hess Fire Truck And Ladder Rescue – There were 100 chrome trucks slid into regular boxes. Anyone who bought a truck and found one of these has a very special truck, including a certificate of authenticity. You could also get one from your name being drawn in a sweepstakes by Hess.
- 2018 First Hess Truck – Sold to the public. It was released to commemorate 85 years of the Hess brand. It is mostly based on the 1982–1983 & 1985 models with some restyling and includes lights & sounds. It sold out a day after its release.
- 2023 Collector's Edition Ocean Explorer – Sold to the public. It was released to commemorate 90 years of the Hess brand.
- 2026 Collector's Edition Tanker Trucks – Sold to the public. It was released to commemorate more than 60 years of a proud and beloved tradition of the Hess Toy Trucks.

== Philanthropy ==
In Christmas of 2011, The Hess Corporation donated 900 of its 2011 Hess Toy Trucks and Race Cars to the Salvation Army for the underprivileged children in North Dakota.

A Hess Toy Truck Float in the annual Macy's Thanksgiving Day Parade in New York participated from 2000 to 2014, when the Hess Corporation's retail unit was sold. In 2018 and 2019, Hess Corporation donated Hess Toy Trucks and STEM education kits to every elementary school in North Dakota. A total of approximately 6,700 trucks were distributed.
