= Mashu (band) =

- Origin: England
- Genres: Improvisational
- Years active: 1995–1998
- Past members: Mark Hewins; Shyamal Maïtra; Hugh Hopper

MASHU was a Canterbury scene improvisational supergroup that lasted from 1995 to 1998. The name is a reference to Mashu (a mountain in the Epic of Gilgamesh) and a combination of the first two letters of the band members' first names: MArk Hewins (guitar), SHyamal Maïtra (percussion), and HUgh Hopper (bass).

Hopper and Hewins had already been collaborating as a duo when they were joined by Maïtra, formerly of Gong. The band debuted in February 1995 at the Vortex Jazz Bar. A European tour followed in April 1995 from which is taken their only release, Elephants in Your Head? (1996). Saxophonist Frank van der Kooij guested on the first tour date, with saxophonists Didier Malherbe and Elton Dean guesting at a later show.

The band played a handful of shows in 1996, 1997 and 1998. Since then, Hewins and Maïtra have continued to work together on other projects.

== Discography ==
- Elephants in Your Head? (1996)
