= The Gypsy Cried (song) =

Single by Lou Christie

from the album Lou Christie
- B-side: "Red Sails In The Sunset"
- Released: December 1962
- Genre: Pop
- Length: 2:05
- Label: Co & Ce Records
- Songwriters: Twyla Herbert & Lou Christie (as Lugee Sacco)
- Producer: Nick Cenci

Lou Christie singles chronology
"The Gypsy Cried" (1962)	"Two Faces Have I" (1963)

"The Gypsy Cried" is a song written by Twyla Herbert & Lou Christie, using his actual name Lugee Sacco, which was released by Lou Christie as a single in 1962. The name "Lou Christie" was chosen by Co & Ce Records, and "The Gypsy Cried" was credited to "Lou Christie" before they had consulted with Sacco about the name.

The song was the first song that Herbert and Christie wrote together, written over a period of 15 minutes, and was Lou Christie's first hit. Producer Nick Cenci had originally suggested that Christie make a sound-alike record resembling The Four Seasons, given that Christie had a similar power falsetto register to Four Seasons frontman Frankie Valli; Christie resisted the suggestion, stating in a 2016 interview that he did not want to make records that sounded like another performer.

The song was initially released by Pittsburgh-based Co & Ce Records, and was a local hit in Pittsburgh, but it was soon picked up by Roulette Records and became a national hit. The song was released on Lou Christie's eponymous album in 1963.

The song spent 13 weeks on the Billboard Hot 100 chart, peaking at No. 24 on March 16, 1963, while reaching No. 18 on the Cash Box Top 100, and No. 3 on Canada's CHUM Hit Parade.

A cover by Swedish pop rock band the Hounds was released on their second studio album From the Hounds with Love in December 1967 through Gazell. When issued as a single on 7 January 1968, with "Old Man in New York" as the B-side, their version reached No. 4 on Tio i Topp and No. 17 on Kvällstoppen in March 1968. It was their final top-ten single in Sweden.
