= Lightnin' Strikes =

Single by Lou Christie

from the album Lightnin' Strikes
- B-side: "Cryin' in the Streets"
- Released: October 7, 1965
- Recorded: September 3, 1965
- Studio: Olmstead Studios, New York City, New York
- Genre: Pop
- Length: 3:05
- Label: MGM
- Songwriters: Lou Christie; Twyla Herbert
- Producer: Charles Calello

Lou Christie singles chronology
"How Many Teardrops" (1963)	"Lightnin' Strikes" (1965)	"Outside the Gates of Heaven" (1966)

Official audio
- "Lightnin' Strikes" on YouTube

"Lightnin' Strikes" is a song written by Lou Christie and Twyla Herbert, and recorded by Christie on the MGM label. It was a hit in 1966, making it to No. 1 in Canada in February 1966 on the RPM Top Singles chart, then to No. 1 in the U.S. on the Billboard Hot 100 in February, No. 3 on the New Zealand Listener chart in May, and No. 11 on the UK Record Retailer chart. It attained RIAA certification on March 3, 1966, garnering gold status for shipping a million copies.

== Personnel ==
The song was arranged, conducted, and produced by Charles Calello and was recorded on September 3, 1965. The song featured backing vocals from Bernadette Carroll, previously of the Starlets, and Peggy Santiglia and Denise Ferri of the Delicates. Session personnel included Joe Farrell and George Young on baritone sax; Ray DeSio on trombone; Stan Free on piano; Lou Mauro on bass; Charlie Macy, Ralph Casale, and Vinnie Bell on guitar; and Buddy Saltzman on drums. Ralph Casale's "stuttering" guitar solo was an overdub.

== Release ==
MGM Records released "Lightnin' Strikes" as a single in the US on October 7, 1965, with "Cryin' in the Streets" as the B-side. According to Billboard, the single "didn't happen overnight" and took several months to chart. MGM A&R man Frank Mancini credits radio stations in Youngstown and Erie, Pennsylvania – particularly WJET – with assisting in promoting the single. "Lightnin' Strikes" entered the Billboard Hot 100 on December 25, 1965 at a position of 93, before reaching number one on February 19, 1966, replacing Petula Clark's "My Love". It remained at number one for a week, before being replaced by Nancy Sinatra's "These Boots Are Made for Walkin'". "Lightnin' Strikes" spent 15 weeks on the charts, was Christie's only number one single in the US, and his first chart entry since "How Many Teardrops" in August 1963.

In the UK, MGM released "Lightnin' Strikes" on February 4, 1966, and it entered the Record Retailer charts on March 2 at a position of 40 before peaking at number 11 for two weeks starting on March 23. In total, it spent eight weeks on the charts. "Lightnin' Strikes" was the first of four top-40 singles Lou Christie scored in the UK. On the chart published by New Musical Express, "Lightnin' Strikes" reached number nine for one week.

== Charts ==
=== Weekly charts ===
Chart (1965–1966)	Peak position
Australia (Kent Music Report)	9
Canada (RPM)	1
New Zealand (Listener)	3
UK (Disc Weekly)	12
UK (Melody Maker)	11
UK (New Musical Express)	9
UK (Record Retailer)	11
US (Billboard Hot 100)	1
US (Cash Box Top 100)	1
US (Record World 100 Top Pops)	1

=== Year-end charts ===
Chart (1966)	Peak position
US (Billboard)	17
US (Cash Box)	15

== Certifications ==
Region	Certification	Certified units/sales
United States (RIAA)	Gold	1,000,000^{^}
Summaries
Worldwide	—	2,000,000
^{^} Shipments figures based on certification alone.
