= I'm Gonna Make You Mine (Lou Christie song) =

Single by Lou Christie

from the album I'm Gonna Make You Mine
- B-side: "I'm Gonna Get Married"
- Released: June 1969
- Genre: Bubblegum pop
- Length: 2:41
- Label: Buddah Records
- Songwriter: Tony Romeo
- Producers: Stan Vincent, Mike Duckman

Lou Christie singles chronology
"Canterbury Road" (1968)	"I'm Gonna Make You Mine" (1969)	"Are You Getting Any Sunshine?" (1969)

"I'm Gonna Make You Mine" is a song released in 1969 by Lou Christie. It was featured on his 1969 album I'm Gonna Make You Mine, arranged by Stan Vincent and produced by Vincent and Mike Duckman.

== Background ==
The song was written by Tony Romeo, best known for the 1970 Partridge Family hit "I Think I Love You." The first recording was by The Camel Drivers in 1968.

Lou Christie's version was arranged in the style of Phil Spector's Wall of Sound. Backing vocals were provided by Ellie Greenwich and Linda Scott, in one of the latter's final recordings before leaving show business.

== Chart performance ==
The song spent 12 weeks on the Billboard Hot 100 chart, peaking at No. 10, while reaching No. 2 on the UK Singles Chart and on WLS and No. 5 on Canada's RPM 100.

"I'm Gonna Make You Mine" was ranked No. 60 on Billboard magazine's Top Hot 100 songs of 1969.

=== Weekly charts ===
Chart (1969)	Peak position
Australia (Go-Set)	28
Belgium (Flanders)	17
Canada RPM 100	5
Canada (CHUM 30)	5
Germany	29
Ireland (IRMA)	4
Netherlands (Hilversum 3 Top 30)	14
Netherlands (Veronica Top 40)	19
New Zealand (Listener)	13
South Africa (Springbok)	7
UK Singles Chart	2
US Billboard Hot 100	10
US Cash Box Top 100	7
US Record World 100 Top Pops	5
Belgium (Wallonia)	35

=== Year-end charts ===
Chart (1969)	Rank
Canada - RPM's 100 Hits of 1969	66
UK Singles Chart	28
US Billboard Top Hot 100 Singles	60
US Cash Box Top 100 Chart Hits	65
