= Two Faces Have I =

1963 single by Lou Christie

Single by Lou Christie

from the album Lou Christie
- B-side: "All That Glitters Isn't Gold"
- Released: March 1963
- Recorded: 1963
- Genre: Pop
- Length: 2:44
- Label: Roulette Records 4481
- Songwriters: Twyla Herbert, Lou Christie
- Producer: Nick Cenci

Lou Christie singles chronology
"The Jury" (1963)	"Two Faces Have I" (1963)	"How Many Teardrops" (1963)

"Two Faces Have I" is a song written by Twyla Herbert and Lou Christie and performed by Christie in his signature falsetto. The song was produced by Nick Cenci and was featured on his 1963 album, Lou Christie. It reached No. 6 on the Billboard Hot 100, and #11 on the R&B chart. Outside of the US, "Two Faces Have I" peaked at #3 in Canada, #6 on the New Zealand Lever Hit Parade Chart and #20 in Australia.

The song was ranked No. 44 on Billboard's end of year ranking "Top Records of 1963". the song was recorded at Gateway Studios in Pittsburgh on February 6, 1963. Ronnie Cochrane (a local Pittsburgh based guitar player) is playing guitar on the track and a local Pittsburgh band called Johnny Wilson's Debonaires provide the song's instrumental backing along with the song's co writer (Twyla Herbert) playing piano on the track.

This song was the inspiration behind Bruce Springsteen's "Two Faces", which featured on his 1987 album Tunnel of Love.

== Ol' 55 version ==
"Two Faces Have I"

Single by Ol' 55

from the album The Vault
- B-side: "The Fool"
- Released: June 1980
- Studio: Leo Recorders, Sydney
- Genre: Rock and roll, Classic rock
- Label: Leo Records, Polydor Records
- Songwriters: Twyla Herbert, Lou Christie
- Producer: Tony Spencer

Ol' 55 singles chronology
"Comic Book World" (1980)	"Two Faces Have I" (1980)	"Anywhere the Girls Are" (1980)

Australian band Ol' 55 released a version of "Two Faces Have I" as the lead single from their fourth studio album The Vault (1980). The song peaked at number 15, becoming the band's fifth top twenty single

=== Track listing ===
7" (2079 148)

- Side A "Two Faces Have I"
- Side B "The Fool"

=== Charts ===
==== Weekly charts ====
Chart (1980)	Peak position
Australia (Kent Music Report)	15

==== Year-end charts ====
Chart (1980)	Position
Australia (Kent Music Report)	67

== Other versions ==
- Frank Alamo released a version in 1963 entitled "Tout Se Sait Un Jour" as part of the EP Surf!
- The Thai band Royal Sprites released a version in 1983 under the title Nah Aai (Thai: น่าอาย).
- American rock band Garbo's Daughter covered the song on their 2010 7" single on Italy's Surfin' Ki Records.
