= Rhapsody in the Rain =

Single by Lou Christie

from the album Painter of Hits
- B-side: "Trapeze"
- Released: March 1966
- Genre: Pop
- Length: 2:46
- Label: MGM Records 13473
- Songwriters: Twyla Herbert, Lou Christie
- Producer: Charlie Calello

Lou Christie singles chronology
"Big Time" (1966)	"Rhapsody in the Rain" (1966)	"Painter" (1966)

"Rhapsody in the Rain" is a song written by Twyla Herbert and Lou Christie and performed by Christie with backing vocals by The Delicates. It reached No. 10 on Canada's RPM 100, No. 16 on the Billboard Hot 100, No. 37 on the UK's Record Retailer chart, and No. 40 in Australia in 1966. It was featured on his 1966 album, Painter of Hits.

The song was produced and arranged by Charlie Calello.

Many radio stations banned the song due to the controversial lyrics. MGM had Christie re-record the song's opening lyrics to release a "clean" version.

== In popular culture ==
Both the official Super Bowl XLI highlight film and an NFL's Greatest Games episode about that game took their title from this song.
