= Gazell =

Swedish jazz record label

Bonnier Gazell Music
- Parent company: The Bonnier Group
- Founded: 1949
- Founder: John Engelbrekt; Dag Häggqvist
- Distributor: Bonnier Music Publishing
- Genre: Jazz
- Country of origin: Sweden
- Location: Stockholm
- Official website: www.gazell.net

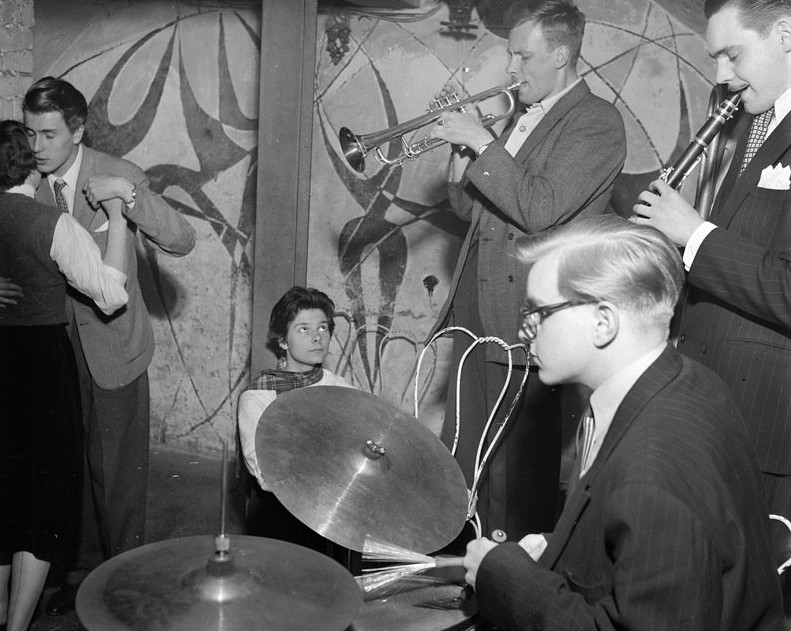
Jazzklubben Gazell Club 1952

Gazell is a jazz record label founded by John Engelbrekt in Stockholm, Sweden, in 1949.

== History ==
In 1949, John Engelbrekt created the label Gazell in Stockholm, Sweden, to distribute jazz albums. In September 1950, he founded a jazz club in Stockholm called Gazell. In 1957, recordings from the club and by Engelbrekt were sold to the Scandinavian Record Company (Sonet Records) run by Gunnar Bergström and Sven Lindholm, while the rights to the label Gazell were sold to Dag Häggqvist, though other sources say Häggqvist started the label himself in 1950.

Häggqvist sold Gazell to Sonet in 1960 and was run by Sam Charters until Sonet was acquired by PolyGram in 1991. Häggqvist retained the rights to the label again in 1993 when he formed Gazell Music AB.

In 2004, Häggqvist made a deal with Bonnier Music Publishing, a subsidiary of The Bonnier Group. Since then, the companies have been called Bonnier Gazell Music.

== See also ==
- List of record labels
