= Lou Christie =

American singer-songwriter (1943–2025)

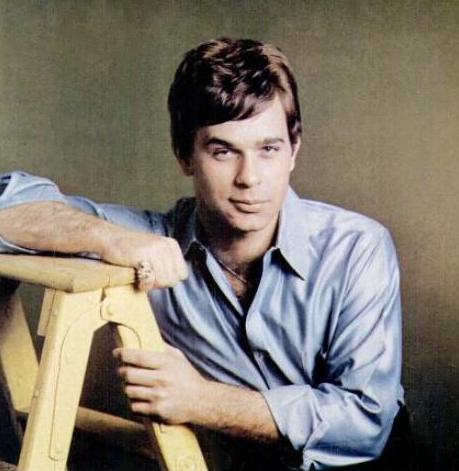
- Christie in 1966

Background information
- Born: Lugee Alfredo Giovanni Sacco; February 19, 1943; Glenwillard, Pennsylvania, U.S.
- Died: June 18, 2025 (aged 82) Pittsburgh, Pennsylvania, U.S.
- Genres: Pop; soft rock; pop rock
- Occupation: Singer-songwriter
- Years active: 1962–2023
- Labels: Roulette; Colpix; MGM; Columbia; Buddah

Lugee Alfredo Giovanni Sacco (February 19, 1943 – June 18, 2025), known professionally by his stage name Lou Christie, was an American pop and soft rock singer-songwriter widely known for hits in the 1960s, including his 1966 U.S. chart-topper "Lightnin' Strikes" and 1969 UK number two hit "I'm Gonna Make You Mine".

== Biography ==
=== Early life and career ===
Christie was born Lugee Alfredo Giovanni Sacco on February 19, 1943, in Glenwillard, Pennsylvania, and grew up in suburban Pittsburgh. While attending Moon Area High School, he studied music and voice, served as student conductor of the choir and sang solos at holiday concerts. His teacher, Frank Cummings, wanted him to pursue a career in classical music, but Sacco wanted to cut a record to get on American Bandstand. At age 15, he met and befriended Twyla Herbert, a classically trained musician 20 years his senior, who became his regular songwriting partner and wrote hundreds of songs with him over the next 30 years until her death in 2009. Sacco performed with several vocal groups and between 1959 and 1962 released several records on small Pittsburgh labels, achieving a local hit with "The Jury" by Lugee & The Lions (a group consisting of Sacco, Twyla Herbert's daughter Shirley, and two others) released on the Robbee label. After graduating from high school in 1961, Sacco traveled to New York City and worked as a session vocalist.

In 1962, Sacco approached Nick Cenci with some demo tapes. One of the first things Cenci did was change the name Lugee Alfredo Giovanni Sacco to Lou Christie. Sacco's father liked the name change, because it had "Christ" in it. The singer himself did not like the name, though he was open to using a stage name and was compiling a list of suggestions before Cenci unilaterally picked "Lou Christie" without asking him; he later recalled it taking him 20 years to get used to it.

Cenci liked Sacco's falsetto voice and suggested that he listen to the Four Seasons' recent hit "Sherry". Sacco and Herbert used the song as a model to write an original song called "The Gypsy Cried". (Christie did not acknowledge any inspiration from The Four Seasons in interviews, noting that he strove not to sound like other recording artists.) Cenci produced a recording of Sacco performing the song at Gateway Studio in Pittsburgh and initially released it on his own C & C label as a single in 1962, credited to "Lou Christie", the name Sacco used thereafter.

"The Gypsy Cried" became a regional hit, selling 30,000 copies in Pittsburgh. Cenci contacted Morris Levy of Roulette Records, saying that he had a hit that needed national distribution. Levy released the single on Roulette, but initially nothing happened. Airplay slowly spread across the country, and "The Gypsy Cried" reached No. 24 on the Billboard Hot 100 chart, selling over one million copies. Cenci produced additional recording sessions for Christie in 1963 that generated two more hits. "Two Faces Have I", his second million-seller, reached No. 6 on the chart in June 1963. Roulette also released Christie's self-titled LP (where "The Gypsy Cried" and "Two Faces Have I" are included), which reached No. 124 on the Billboard 200. With those hits, Christie joined Dick Clark's Caravan of Stars Tour, alongside Diana Ross, Brian Hyland, and others.

During this pre-Army phase of his career, the female vocalists featured on Christie's records were The Tammys, a trio from Pleasantville, Venango County, Pennsylvania. Christie and Herbert wrote the single "Egyptian Shumba" for the group, and although it was not a hit, it became a cult favorite in the Northern Soul scene in the early 1970s.

Christie made numerous TV appearances on Where the Action Is (1965–1967), and also appeared on American Bandstand and The Buddy Deane Show (1962–1964) in Baltimore. He also sang with Del Shannon.

Christie's third Roulette release, "How Many Teardrops" (written by Milan), stalled at No. 46 as Christie's career was temporarily derailed by his induction into the U.S. Army. Christie did not have another charting single for two and a half years. Despite threats from Roulette owner Morris Levy, Christie managed to get out of his contract with the company.

=== "Lightnin' Strikes" and "Rhapsody In The Rain": 1965–1966 ===
Christie's career was quickly re-established after his discharge from the military when he signed with the MGM label. MGM reportedly disliked Christie's first single for the label, the Christie-Herbert song "Lightnin' Strikes". But Christie's new management promoted the record in California, and when it gained some traction (eventually reaching No. 2 on KHJ the last two weeks of 1965), MGM released it. "Lightnin' Strikes" reached number one in the U.S. on Christie's 23rd birthday on February 19, 1966, entered the UK Top 20, becoming his first hit in that country, and peaked at number one in Canada. The song featured his signature falsetto and included a female chorus (Bernadette Carroll, Denise Ferri, and Peggy Santiglia) shouting "Stop!" in counterpoint to the lead vocal:

When I see lips begging to be kissed (Stop!)
I can't stop, (Stop!) no I can't stop myself! (Stop! Stop!)

Christie's next release in the spring of 1966, "Rhapsody in the Rain", featured a melody inspired by Tchaikovsky's "Romeo and Juliet", telling of a teenager's memory of his sexual experience in the back seat of a car during a rainstorm as the windshield wipers made a rhythmic sound of "together, together". Later, after the romance ends, the wipers seem to say "never, never". Many radio stations banned the song after hearing the opening lyrics:

Baby, the raindrops play for me
Our lovely rhapsody, 'cause on our first date
We were makin' out in the rain.
And in this car, our love went much too far
It was exciting as thunder
Tonight I wonder, where you are?

MGM insisted on a re-recorded version that toned down the lyrics. The third and fourth lines were changed to:

We fell in love in the rain
And in this car, love came like a falling star

Despite the edited version, many radio stations instead played two older songs re-released by other labels for which Christie had once recorded: "Outside the Gates of Heaven" (on Co & Ce Records) peaked at No. 45, while "Big Time" (on Colpix Records) hit No. 95. All three singles hit nationally within three weeks of one another, in March 1966, while "Lightnin' Strikes" was falling down the chart. After his follow-up "Painter" peaked at No. 81, Christie's later records for MGM, including "If My Car Could Only Talk" arranged and produced by Jack Nitzsche, failed to chart.

=== Resurgence: 1967–1970 ===
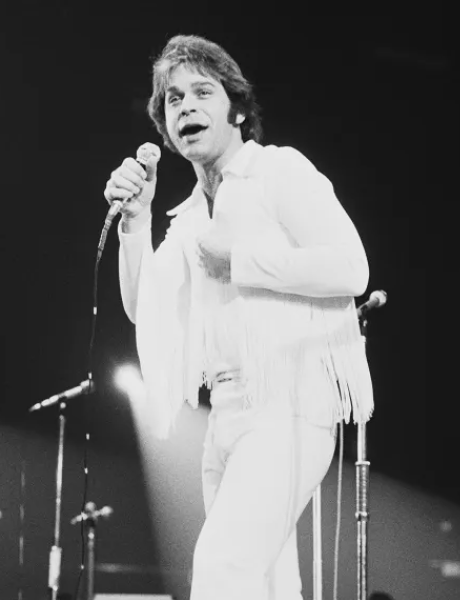
Lou Christie performing in the U.K. in April 1970

In the late 1960s, after being dropped by MGM, Christie had an unfruitful stint with Columbia Records. Christie recalled that Columbia was mainly interested in grooming Christie to be another "beach party" actor in the vein of Frankie Avalon, but Christie believed that the genre was going out of style and declined. He then joined Buddah Records in 1968, a move prompted by his business manager Stan Polley and bubblegum music record producer Tony Romeo. He had a surprise Wall of Sound constant uptempo hit "I'm Gonna Make You Mine", which Romeo wrote, in the early autumn of 1969. Helped by backing vocalists Linda Scott, Lesley Gore, and Valerie Simpson, and by two promotional videos distinctly different from each other, the song peaked at No. 10 in the US, but climbed to No. 2 on the UK Singles Chart and thus became his biggest hit there.

A follow-up, "She Sold Me Magic", never released as a single in the United States, charted in the UK where it peaked at No. 25, and in Japan where it reached No.1. It was later covered by Elton John. Conversely, "Are You Getting Any Sunshine?" only charted in America, where it reached No. 73.

=== Later career: 1971–2025 ===
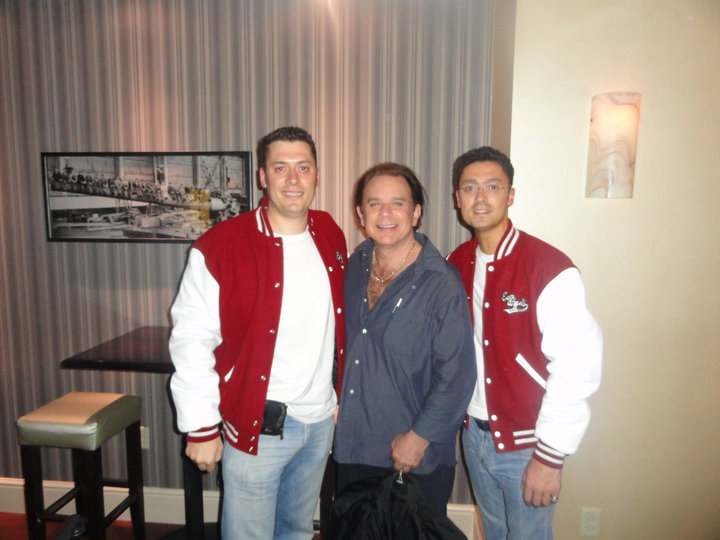
Lou Christie (center) with the Earth Angels in 2010

Christie spent the early 1970s between London and New York City. In 1971 he released a concept album called Paint America Love, regarded by some (including Christie himself) as his best LP, and married former UK beauty queen Francesca Winfield in London. In the U.S., he recorded "The Lion Sleeps Tonight", but after a dispute between his manager Stan Polley and Neil Bogart of Buddah, Christie's vocals were removed and replaced by those of the similar-sounding Robert John, whose version became a major hit. Christie was also peripherally involved in the legal issues around Five Arts Management, a company set up by Polley, which contributed to the suicides of Badfinger members Pete Ham and Tom Evans. By this time, Christie had grown tired of industry meddling in his career and of singing falsetto.

Christie returned to the United States, and lived for a time in Lake Charles, Louisiana. In 1974, he tried a new musical style, going country on his album Lou Christie. This album is also known unofficially as Beyond the Blue Horizon after its best known track, a cover of a hit song from 1930 written for the film Monte Carlo. The song missed the Country charts and only made No. 80 on the pop chart but managed No. 12 on the Adult Contemporary chart. The song has been used in several film soundtracks, including 1988's Rain Man.

In the spring of 1978 Christie returned home to Pittsburgh to head the upstart record Label 2001 records, a branch of the 2001 and VIP nightclubs nationwide. While visiting local friends at the Staircase Lounge, Christie heard a local group, Sweet Breeze, and loved the band's harmonies and music. Christie signed the band Sweet Breeze to their first recording contract and the band recorded a song written by Christie and Herbert called "Summer in Malibu" that was a regional hit for the band. He supplemented his income during this period by taking a job as a truck driver.

Christie became active on the oldies circuit starting in the early 1980s, scoring a final U.S. chart hit, credited as "Summer '81 Medley" by The Cantina Band (featuring Lou Christie), in 1981, performing a medley of Beach Boys classics.

In 1986, he recorded a duet with Lesley Gore of a medley of "Since I Don't Have You"/"It's Only Make Believe" for Manhattan Records, a division of EMI-America. The two singers were touring together at the time, and the song was released only as a one-off single.

Christie was credited as special music collaborator on the movie Barcelona, released in 1994. He and Mark Suozzo wrote a song, "Breakin' Up", which Christie performed and which was included in the soundtrack album for the film.

In 1997, Christie recorded his first all-new album since the 1970s, entitled Pledging My Love and produced by Alan Grossman & Jimm Mosher of Hit Music Studio in Spencer, North Carolina. Billboard labeled this new album "Most Impressive Comeback" album. Most of it was penned by Christie, presented in a contemporary manner, and included the songs "What Happened to the Nights", "Techno Pop" (a diatribe about the loss of communication in our lives), and "I Sure Fell in Love" and covers of the Critters' "Mr. Dieingly Sad" and Johnny Ace's title tune. Cub Koda said it was "loaded with AOR hits".

In 2004, Christie released his first concert album, Greatest Hits Live From The Bottom Line, which featured studio recording "Christmas In New York" as a bonus track. In addition to the occasional new release, Christie remained a concert act on the oldies circuit in the U.S. and UK. He also hosted a series of programs on SiriusXM radio for the 1960s channel. In 2015, Christie released his first new recording in several years, entitled "Drive In Dreams", written by Gregory Scharpf, who is a former member of Sweet Breeze, the Pittsburgh-based band that Christie signed to their first recording contract. His next release was 2016's "When You Were Young", also penned by Scharpf. In December 2021 Lou Christie released "Love Goes On Forever" written with Jimmy Cunningham. In March 2022 "Luv Attack" followed, also written with Jimmy Cunningham. Groove N Jams published a favorable review of "Luv Attack" writing, "The way Christie drops alien processing into the mix feels as sharp and strange and thrilling as anything he did in the 60s."

Christie succeeded Bobby Rydell as a member of the supergroup Dick Fox's Golden Boys (also featuring 1950s teen idols Frankie Avalon and Fabian) after Rydell's death in 2022. Christie maintained the ability to sing falsetto well into his 70s, which made him a popular act on the oldies circuit.

Christie died from cancer in Pittsburgh, on June 18, 2025, at the age of 82.

== Discography ==
=== Singles ===
Year	Title	Peak chart positions							Record Label	B-side From same album as A-side except where indicated	Album
Year	Title	US BB	US CB	US AC	US R&B	UK	CAN (CHUM) (RPM)	AUS	Record Label	B-side From same album as A-side except where indicated	Album
1962	"The Gypsy Cried"	24	18	—	—	—	3	—	Roulette Records	"Red Sails in the Sunset" (Non-LP track)	Lou Christie
1963	"Two Faces Have I"	6	3	—	11	—	3	20	Roulette Records	"All That Glitters Isn't Gold"	Lou Christie
1963	"How Many Teardrops"	46	41	—	—	—	23	79	Roulette Records	"You and I (Have a Right to Cry)"(No. 119 US CB)	Lou Christie
1963	"Shy Boy"	119	135	—	—	—	—	—	Roulette Records	"It Can Happen"	Non-LP tracks
1964	"Stay"	—	—	—	—	—	—	—	Roulette Records	"There They Go" (Non-LP track)	Lou Christie
1964	"Guitars and Bongos"	123	131	—	—	—	44	—	Colpix Records	"Merry-Go-Round" (Non-LP track)	Lou Christie Strikes Again
1964	"Have I Sinned"	—	—	—	—	—	—	—	Colpix Records	"Pot of Gold"	Lou Christie Strikes Again
1965	"Why Did You Do It Baby"	—	—	—	—	—	—	—	Colpix Records	"Make Summer Last Forever"	Lou Christie Strikes Again
1965	"A Teenager in Love"	—	—	—	—	—	—	—	Colpix Records	"Back Track"	Lou Christie Strikes Again
1965	"Lightnin' Strikes"	1	1	—	—	11	1	9	MGM Records	"Cryin' in the Streets"	Lightnin' Strikes
1966	"Outside the Gates of Heaven"	45	59	—	—	—	32	—	Co & Ce Records	"All That Glitters Isn't Gold"	Non-LP tracks
1966	"Big Time"	95	—	—	—	—	—	—	Colpix Records	"Cryin' on My Knees"	Lou Christie Strikes Again
1966	"Rhapsody in the Rain"	16	20	—	—	37	10	40	MGM Records	"Trapeze" (from Lightning Strikes)	Painter of Hits
1966	"Painter"	81	77	—	—	—	60	—	MGM Records	"Du Ronda"	Painter of Hits
1966	"If My Car Could Only Talk"	118	—	—	—	—	—	—	MGM Records	"Song of Lita"	Non-LP tracks
1966	"Since I Don't Have You"	102	101	—	—	—	71	—	MGM Records	"Wild Life's in Season"	Painter of Hits
1967	"Shake Hands and Walk Away Cryin'"	95	—	—	—	—	—	—	Columbia Records	"Escape"	Non-LP tracks
1967	"Self Expression (The Kids on the Street Will Never Give In)"	—	127	—	—	—	—	—	Columbia Records	"Back to the Days of the Romans"	Non-LP tracks
1967	"I Remember Gina"	—	139	—	—	—	—	—	Columbia Records	"Escape"	Non-LP tracks
1967	"Don't Stop Me (Jump Off the Edge of Love)"	—	—	—	—	—	—	—	Columbia Records	"Back to the Days of the Romans"	Non-LP tracks
1968	"Genesis and the Third Verse"	—	—	—	—	—	—	—	Buddah Records	"Rake Up the Leaves"	Non-LP tracks
1968	"Canterbury Road"	—	—	—	—	—	—	—	Buddah Records	"Saints of Aquarius"	Non-LP tracks
1969	"I'm Gonna Make You Mine"	10	7	—	—	2	5	28	Buddah Records	"I'm Gonna Get Married"	I'm Gonna Make You Mine
1969	"Are You Getting Any Sunshine?"	73	84	—	—	—	56	—	Buddah Records	"It'll Take Time"	I'm Gonna Make You Mine
1970	"Love Is Over"	—	—	—	—	—	—	—	Buddah Records	"She Sold Me Magic" (from I'm Gonna Make You Mine) (No. 25 UK) (No. 1 JP)	Non-LP tracks
1970	"Indian Lady"	106	75	39	—	—	—	89	Buddah Records	"Glory River"	Non-LP tracks
1971	"Lighthouse"	—	—	—	—	—	—	—	Three Brothers Records	"Waco"	Paint America Love
1972	"Sing Me, Sing Me"	—	—	—	—	—	—	—	Three Brothers Records	"Paper Song"	Paint America Love
1973	"Blue Canadian Rocky Dream"	—	102	—	—	—	—	—	Three Brothers Records	"Wilma Lee and Stoney"	Lou Christie
1974	"Beyond the Blue Horizon"	80	72	12	—	—	57	—	Three Brothers Records	"Saddle the Wind"	Lou Christie
1974	"Good Mornin'/Zip-a-Dee-Doo-Dah"	—	—	—	—	—	—	—	Three Brothers Records	"You Were the One"	Lou Christie
1975	"Summer Days"	—	120	—	—	—	—	—	Slipped Disc Records	"The One and Only Original Sunshine Kid"	Non-LP tracks
1976	"Riding in My Van"	—	—	—	—	—	—	—	Epic Records	"Summer in Malibu"	Non-LP tracks
1976	"You're Gonna Make Love to Me"	—	—	—	—	—	—	—	Midland International Records	"Fantasies"	Non-LP tracks
1977	"Spanish Wine"	—	95	—	—	—	—	—	Midland International Records	"Dancing in the Sand"	Non-LP tracks
1986	Lou Christie/Lesley Gore "Since I Don't Have You"/"It's Only Make Believe"	—	—	—	—	—	—	—	Manhattan Records	"Our Love Was Meant To Be"	Non-LP tracks
1990	Lou Christie/Pia Zadora "Don't Knock My Love" (shortVersion)	—	—	—	—	—	—	—	Midsong Records	"Don't Knock My Love" (LongVersion)	Non-LP tracks

=== Albums ===
- Lou Christie (Roulette, 1963, No. 124 US)
- Lou Christie Strikes Again (Colpix, February 1966)
- Lightnin' Strikes (MGM, March 1966, No. 103 US)
- Painter Of Hits (MGM, 1966)
- I'm Gonna Make You Mine (Buddah, 1969)
- Paint America Love (Buddah, 1971)
- Lou Christie (Three Brothers, 1974)
- Lou Christie Does Detroit (51 West, 1982)
- Pledging My Love (Varèse Sarabande, 1997)
- Greatest Hits Live From The Bottom Line (Varèse Sarabande, 2004)
- The Turquoise Trail (Lightning Strikes, 2012)
- Summer In Malibu (Lightning Strikes, 2015)

=== Collections ===
- Rhapsody In The Grooves: His Finest Recordings 1962–1969 (Raven LP, 1984)
- EnLightnin'ment — The Best of Lou Christie (Rhino, 1988)
- Greatest Hits Vol. 1 (Lightning Strikes, 1993)
- Glory River — The Buddah Years 1968–1972 (Sequel, 1992)
- Beyond The Blue Horizon: More of the Best (Varèse Sarabande, 1994)
- Greatest Hits Vol. 2 (Lightning Strikes, 1997)
- Egyptian Shumba: Singles & Rare Recordings 1962–64 (w/ The Tammys) (RPM, 2001)
- Original Sinner: The Very Best Of The MGM Recordings (RPM, 2004)
- Studio 102 Essentials (Studio 102, 2008)
- Gypsy Bells — Columbia Recordings 1967 (Ace, 2024)
