= Time to Rock 'n' Roll: The Anthology =

Compilation album by Ol' 55
- Released: 26 August 2016
- Recorded: 1975–1986
- Studio: Trafalgar Studios, Leo Recorders, Earth Media Studios
- Genre: Pop rock; Doo Wop
- Label: Festival Records; Warner Music Australia
- Producer: Bob Taylor; Charles Fisher; John Sayers; Rich Griner; Tony Spencer

Ol' 55 chronology
Should'a Been Here Yesterday (2001)	Time to Rock 'n' Roll: The Anthology (2016)

Time to Rock 'n' Roll: The Anthology is a compilation album by Australian band Ol' 55, released in August 2016.

The album celebrates the 40th anniversary of their debut studio album, Take It Greasy. The 56-track anthology includes the entire Take It Greasy album, plus stand alone singles, album cuts, demos, live recordings and rarities.

== Track listing ==
CD1

1. "Diana" (Paul Anka) - 2:53
2. "Summertime Summertime (Intro)" (Tom Jameson, Sid Feller) - 1:39
3. "The Iridescent Pink Sock Blues" (Glenn Cardier) - 2:25
4. "I Wonder Why" (Melvin Anderson, Ricardo Weeks) - 2:16
5. "Almost Grown" (Chuck Berry) - 2:10
6. "Think It Over (Buddy Holly, Jerry Allison, Norman Petty) - 2:01
7. "Get a Job" (The Silhouettes) - 2:35
8. "Doin' Fine" (Jimmy Manzie) - 2:38
9. "Only Sixteen" Sam Cooke - 2:16
10. "This Little Girl" (Gerry Goffin, Carole King) - 3:07
11. "On the Prowl" (Manzie) - 2:58
12. "New Girl in School" (Jan Berry, Roger Christian, Bob Norman, Brian Wilson) - 2:08
13. "Skateboard Thrills" (Manzie) - 2:31
14. "Looking for an Echo" (Richard Reicheg) - 3:22
15. "Goodnight Sweetheart" (Calvin Carter, James "Pookie" Hudson) - 2:18
16. "School Days (Outro)" (Berry) - 2:07
17. "(I Want a) Rockin' Christmas" (Glenn A. Baker, Manzie) - 4:38
18. "Little Saint Nick" (Wilson, Mike Love) - 3:10
19. "C'mon Let's Do It" (Baker, Manzie) - 2:35
20. "A Teenager in Love" (featuring Jan & Dean) (Doc Pomus, Mort Shuman) - 2:45
21. "My Right of Way" (by Frankie J. Holden) (Baker, Manzie) - 2:53
22. "Chartered Accountant Blues" (by Frankie J. Holden) (Holden) - 5:40
23. "Shout Shout" (Ernie Maresca) - 2:32
24. "Be My Little School Girl" (Paul Winley) - 1:48
25. "High School Confidential" (Jerry Lee Lewis, Ron Hargrave) - 2:30
26. "The Wilde Man" (Manzie) - 4:01
27. "Roll Over Beethoven" (Berry) - 4:12
28. "Pretty Little Angel Eyes" (Curtis Lee, Boyce and Hart) - 2:35

CD2

1. "Do You Wanna Dance" (Bobby Freeman) - 2:32
2. "Love of My Life" (Felice and Boudleaux Bryant) - 2:08
3. "Caught in the Curl" (Manzie) - 2:18
4. "Stay (While the Night Is Still Young)" (Manzie) - 4:06
5. "(Feels Like a) Summer's Night" (Manzie) 3:52
6. "He's Gotta Go" (Bruce Allen, Geoff Peterkin, Manzie, Rockville Jones, Patrick Drummond) - 2:30
7. "Homework's Done" (Peterkin) - 1:42
8. "Ruby" (Jerry Leiber, Mike Stoller) - 2:52
9. "Living for Your Smile" (Manzie) - 3:19
10. "Comic Book World" (Manzie) - 3:10
11. "Time to Rock 'n' Roll" (Manzie) - 2:54
12. "The Way to Fall In Love (Book II)" (Manzie) - 2:32
13. "Peek-A-Boo!" (Jack Hammer) - 2:08
14. "The Fool" (Lee Hazlewood, Naomi Ford) - 2:31
15. "Two Faces Have I (Twyla Herbert, Lou Christie) - 2:57
16. "Keep Your Hands Off My Baby" (Gerry Goffin, Carole King) - 3:35
17. "Anywhere The Girl's Are" (P. F. Sloan, Steve Barri) - 2:57
18. "Boom Boom Baby" (Live) (Dave Burgess) - 2:31
19. "Let's Have a Party" (Live) (Jessie Mae Robinson) - 2:49
20. "I Live for the Sun" (Live) (Richard Henn) - 2:52
21. "Rag Doll" (Bob Crewe, Bob Gaudio) - 2:48
22. "Breakaway" (Boudleaux & Felice Bryant) - 2:39
23. "I'm Only Singing Rock 'n' Roll (for You)" (Ross Wilson) - 3:39
24. "He's Our Golden Boy" (Manzie) - 2:12
25. "Swingin' School" (Bernie Lowe, Dave Appell, Kal Mann) - 2:23
26. "Be True to Your School (Love, Wilson) - 2:59
27. "Surf's Down" (David Ackles) - 2:19
28. "Looking For The Heart Of Saturday Night" (Tom Waits) - 3:11

== Charts ==
Chart (2016)	Peak position
Australian Albums (ARIA)	21

== Notes ==
- Tracks 1-1, 2-6, 2-7 and 1-17 to 1-20 non-album tracks
- Tracks 1-2 to 1-16 taken from the album Take It Greasy
- Tracks 1-21 to 1-22 solo tracks by Frankie J. Holden
- Tracks 1-23 to 1-28 and 2-1 to 2-3 taken from the album Fiveslivejive
- Tracks 2-4, 2-5 and 2-8 to 2-13 taken from the album Cruisin' for a Bruisin'
- Tracks 2-14 to 2-17 taken from the album The Vault
- Tracks 2-18 to 2-20 from the 1983 cassette [{Let's Have A Party - Live}]
- Tracks 2-21 taken from the album Open Top Cars & Girls in Tight T-Shirts
- Tracks 2-22 to 2-28 previously unreleased demo recordings

== Release history ==
Region	Date	Format	Edition(s)	Label	Catalogue
Australia	26 August 2016	CD; digital download	Standard	Festival Records, Warner Music Australia	FEST601048
