= Greasemarks =

Greasemarks: Greatest Hits 1976–79

Greatest hits album by Ol' 55
- Released: 1980
- Recorded: 1975–1979
- Genre: Rock and roll; rock; pop rock
- Label: K-Tel Records, Mushroom Records

Ol' 55 chronology
Cruisin' for a Bruisin' (1978)	Greasemarks: Greatest Hits 1976–79 (1980)	The Vault (1980)

Greasemarks: Greatest Hits 1976–79 is the first greatest hits album to be released by Australian band Ol' 55. The album includes tracks from the band's first three studio albums and was released in 1980.

== Track listing ==
Side one
No.	Title	Writer(s)	Length
1.	"Diana"	Paul Anka
2.	"This Little Girl"	Gerry Goffin, Carole King
3.	"On the Prowl"	Jimmy Manzie
4.	"Iridescent Pink Sock Blues"	Glenn Cardier
5.	"Skateboard Thrills"	Manzie
6.	"Looking for an Echo"	Richard Reicheg
7.	"Little Saint Nick"	Brian Wilson, Mike Love
8.	"(I Want a) Rockin' Christmas"	Glenn A. Baker, Manzie
9.	"C'mon Let's Do It"	Baker, Manzie

Side two
No.	Title	Writer(s)	Length
1.	"Roll Over Beethoven"	Chuck Berry
2.	"Caught in the Curl"	Manzie
3.	"Love of My Life"	Felice and Boudleaux Bryant
4.	"My Right of Way" (by Frankie J Holden)	Baker, Manzie
5.	"Stay (While the Night Is Still Young)"	Manzie
6.	"(Feels Like a) Summer's Night"	Manzie
7.	"Living for Your Smile"	Manzie
8.	"Ruby"	Jerry Leiber, Mike Stoller
9.	"Time to Rock 'n' Roll"	Manzie
