= Mushroom Evolution Concert =

- 1982 triple-LP version

Live album by Various artists
- Released: 1982
- Recorded: 26 January 1982
- Genres: Pop, dance, rock
- Labels: Mushroom, Liberation Blue

Various artists chronology
Mushroom Evolution Concert (1982)	Mushroom 25 Live (1998)

Mushroom Evolution Concert is a live album and video recorded by various Australian artists at celebratory performances held over two days of the Australia Day (26 January) weekend 1982. The Mushroom Evolution Concert was staged for Mushroom Records' tenth anniversary at the Sidney Myer Music Bowl and was organised by label boss, Michael Gudinski. It included a wide range of Australian performers from the label's roster. An estimated audience of 100,000 attended the concerts. In late 1972 Gudinski had been an artist manager and concert promoter when he and business partner, Ray Evans, founded Mushroom Records. The concert was recorded both for audio as a triple-LP and for video on double-VHS and released in 1982 under the same name. Subsequently, these were re-released on 2× CD (2005) and on 3× DVD (expanded with interviews, 2009) respectively. Although a prominent Mushroom Records artist from the 1972–1981 era, Skyhooks did not appear at the concert – they had disbanded in 1980.

== Background ==
Mushroom Evolution Concert was recorded at the concert of the same name which was organised by impresario Michael Gudinski for two days on the Australia Day (26 January) weekend in 1982. Gudinski, and fellow music agent Ray Evans, had formed Mushroom Records in late 1972. The label's first album was an ambitious triple-LP live recording of the 1973 Sunbury Pop Festival. In its first few years Mushroom released albums and singles by some of the most significant Australian rock acts of the period, including Madder Lake, Chain, The Dingoes and Skyhooks. Success with Skyhooks' first few albums followed later by Split Enz and Models enabled Mushroom to dominate the Australian music industry into the 1990s. In 1982, Mushroom Records celebrated its tenth anniversary by running the concert at the Sidney Myer Music Bowl and releasing the triple live album and a related VHS album of the same name later that year. An estimated audience of 100,000 attended the concerts. Although a prominent Mushroom Records artist from the 1972–1981 era, Skyhooks were not represented at the concert – they had disbanded in 1980.

Billy Miller is a former member of The Ferrets, Mike Rudd represented his earlier band Spectrum (later in Indelible Murtceps and Ariel). Paul Kelly was backed by Jo Jo Zep & The Falcons performing songs from his work as Paul Kelly & the Dots. Both Chain and Madder Lake had reformed especially for the concert. The Fives included members from the original Ol' 55 line-up.

In 2009, Liberation Blue issued a triple-DVD of the two days of concert performances. The total time is approximately 420-minutes. Additional interviews are with Joe Camilleri (Jo Jo Zep & The Falcons), Sean Kelly (Models), Billy Miller, Mike Rudd, Kevin Borich, Mick Fettes (Madder Lake), Russell Morris, Matt Taylor (Chain), FJ Holden (Ol' 55) and Red Symons (Skyhooks).

== Track listing ==
1982 Triple-LP, Mushroom Records release

Side one
No.	Title	Writer(s)	Artist(s)	Length
1.	"She Took My Heart"	William Miller, Philip Miles	Billy Miller & the Great Blokes	3:28
2.	"Nice Legs, Shame About the Face"	John Ford, Robert Hudson	Dave & the Derros	2:10
3.	"Other Places"	Paul Brickhill, Paul Northam, Mark Kellet, Campbell Laird	MEO 245	3:54
4.	"Love Comes, Love Goes"	Michael David Rudd	Mike Rudd & the Heaters	3:23
5.	"I'll Be Gone"	Rudd	Mike Rudd & the Heaters	3:41

Side two
No.	Title	Writer(s)	Artist(s)	Length
1.	"Counting the Beat"	Phil Judd, Wayne Stevens, Mark Hough	The Swingers	2:57
2.	"Don't Let Go"	Kevin Nicholas Borich, Garry Paige	Kevin Borich Express	4:25
3.	"Can't Help It"	Borich	Kevin Borich Express	4:33
4.	"Trouble in My Brain"	Jeremy Saxon Oxley	The Sunnyboys	4:02
5.	"Birthday"	John Lennon, Paul McCartney	The Sunnyboys	2:13

Side three
No.	Title	Writer(s)	Artist(s)	Length
1.	"Hand Me Down"	Paul Kelly, G Gadsby	Paul Kelly with Jo Jo Zep & The Falcons	4:49
2.	"Billy Baxter"	Kelly, Chris Langman	Paul Kelly with Jo Jo Zep & The Falcons	2:51
3.	"Love and Devotion"		Jo Jo Zep & The Falcons	5:09
4.	"You Don't Know"	Keith Ansley Anderson	Jo Jo Zep & The Falcons	4:21
5.	"Happy Birthday I.B.M."	Andrew Duffield	Models	2:34
6.	"Local &/Or General"	Sean Patrick Kelly	Models	3:56

Side four
No.	Title	Writer(s)	Artist(s)	Length
1.	"Yes Indeed"	Wayne Geoffrey Burt	Rock Doctors	3:32
2.	"Goodbye Lollipop"	Michael Fettes, Jack Kreemers, Kerry McKenna, John McKinnon	Madder Lake	3:38
3.	"Song for Ernest"	Fettes, Kreemers, McKenna, Brenden Mason, Andy Cowan	Madder Lake	4:52
4.	"12lb. Toothbrush"	Fettes, Kreemers, McKenna, McKinnon	Madder Lake	7:46
5.	"The Heat of the Night"		Russell Morris & the Rubes	4:32
6.	"Roar of the Wild Torpedoes"	Russell Norman Morris	Russell Morris & the Rubes	3:30

Side five
No.	Title	Writer(s)	Artist(s)	Length
1.	"How Come"	Stephen Cummings, Andrew Pendlebury	The Sports	3:15
2.	"Stop the Baby Talking"	Cummings, Pendlebury	The Sports	2:47
3.	"Black and Blue"; "Dust My Blues"; "Blow in D"; "My Arse Is Black with Bourke St"	Phil Manning, Barry Sullivan, Matt Taylor, Barry Harvey; Elmore James, J Bihari; Taylor, Manning, Sullivan, Harvey; Taylor	Chain	8:58
4.	"I Remember When I Was Young"	Taylor	Chain	6:48
5.	"C'mon Let's Do It"	Glenn A. Baker, James Manzie	The Fives	2:25
6.	"On the Prowl"	Manzie	The Fives	3:18
7.	"Goodnight Sweetheart"	Calvin Carter, James Hudson	The Fives	2:26

Side six
No.	Title	Writer(s)	Artist(s)	Length
1.	"Sitting in Limbo"	G Bright, Jimmy Cliff	Renée Geyer & Friends	7:12
2.	"Say I Love You"	Edmund Montague Grant	Renée Geyer & Friends	5:31
3.	"Heading in the Right Direction"	Garry Paige, Punch	Renée Geyer & Friends	5:29
4.	"Stand By Me"	Ben E. King, Jerry Leiber, Mike Stoller	The Jam (featuring Broderick Smith)	5:04
5.	"Johnny B. Goode"	Chuck Berry	The Jam (featuring Angry Anderson, Matt Taylor)	6:47

== Charts ==
Chart (1982/83)	Peak position
Australia (Kent Music Report)	146

== Re-release tracklisting ==
2005 Double-CD, Liberation Blue re-release

1. "She Took My Heart" – Billy Miller & the Great Blokes – 3:28
2. "Nice Legs, Shame About the Face" – Dave & the Derros – 2:10
3. "Other Places" – MEO 245 – 3:54
4. "Love Comes, Love Goes" – Mike Rudd & The Heaters – 3:23
5. "I'll Be Gone" – Mike Rudd & The Heaters – 3:41
6. "Counting the Beat" – The Swingers – 2:57
7. "Don't Let Go" – Kevin Borich Express – 4:25
8. "Can't Help It" – Kevin Borich Express – 4:33
9. "Trouble in My Brain" – The Sunnyboys – 4:02
10. "Birthday" – The Sunnyboys – 2:13
11. "Hand Me Down" – Paul Kelly – 4:49
12. "Billy Baxter" – Paul Kelly – 2:51
13. "Love and Devotion" – Jo Jo Zep & The Falcons – 5:09
14. "You Don't Know" – Jo Jo Zep & The Falcons – 4:21
15. "Happy Birthday I.B.M" – Models – 2:34
16. "Local and / or General" – Models – 3:56
17. "Yes Indeed" – Rock Doctors – 3:32
18. "In the Heat of the Night" – Russell Morris & The Rubes – 4:32
19. "Roar of the Wild Torpedoes" – Russell Morris & The Rubes – 3:30
1. "Goodbye Lollipop" – Madder Lake – 3:38
2. "Song for Ernest" – Madder Lake – 4:52
3. "12lb Toothbrush" – Madder Lake – 7:46
4. "How Come" – The Sports – 3:15
5. "Stop the Baby Talking" – The Sports – 2:47
6. "Black and Blue" – Chain – 8:58
7. "I Remember When I Was Young" – Chain – 6:48
8. "C'mon Let's Do It" – The Fives – 2:25
9. "On the Prowl" – The Fives – 3:18
10. "Goodnight Sweetheart" – The Fives – 2:26
11. "Sitting in Limbo" – Renée Geyer & Friends – 7:12
12. "Say I Love You" – Renée Geyer & Friends – 5:31
13. "Heading in the Right Direction" – Renée Geyer & Friends – 5:29
14. "Stand By Me" – The Jam – 5:04
15. "Jonny B. Goode" – The Jam – 6:47

2009 Triple-DVD, Liberation Blue release of original concert footage plus additional interviews.

1. "This Is Our Time"
2. "Where Is the Heartbreak"
3. "Secondhand Woman"
4. "Addicted to You"
5. "Save Your Love"
6. "Who Is That Cat"
7. "I Cannot Say"
8. "Domestic Crisis"
9. "Laser Lover"
10. Models
11. "Love Comes, Love Goes"
12. "Media Mania"
13. "It's Only Love" (featuring Glyn Mason)
14. "I'll Take You High"
15. "Some Good Advice"
16. "I'll Be Gone"
17. "We Are Only Human"
18. "Tomorrow's Just Another Day"
19. "Necessary Evil"
20. "Punch and Judy"
21. "Judge and Jury"
22. "Demon Man"
23. "Counting the Beat"
24. "Don't Ever Let Go"
25. "Don't Let Go"
26. "Heartbreaker"
27. "Full Moon"
28. "KB's Boogie"
29. "Getting So Excited"
30. "Shy Boys, Shy Girls"
31. "Can't Help It"
32. "Going Fishing"
33. "Going Somewhere"
34. "Going Down Town"
35. "No Love Around"
36. "It's Not Me"
37. "Trouble in My Brain"
38. "Guts of Iron"
39. "Leaf on a Tree"
40. "Pain"
41. "What You Need"
42. "This Is Real"
43. "Alone with You"
44. "Seeker"
45. "Happy Man"
46. "Birthday"
47. "Truth about Truth about Scientists"
48. "Tearing Hair Out"
49. "Cut Lunch"
50. "Local and/or General"
51. "Unhappy"
52. "Happy Birthday IBM"
53. "Man o' Action"
54. "A Parallel"
55. "Pate Pedestrian"
56. "Atlantic Romantic"
57. "Only Want a Piece of You"
58. "Barnyard Boogie"
59. "Rockabilly Heaven"
60. "Keep Your Hands Off My Baby"
61. "Pleasure Cruiser"
62. "Let's Get Loose"
63. "So Tough"
64. "Get It Right"
65. "In the Heat of the Night"
66. "Roar of the Wild Torpedoes"
67. "Thunder Ground"
68. "Walk Don't Run"
69. "Hush"
70. "Real Thing"
71. "Wings of an Eagle"
72. "Salmon Song"
73. "Goodbye Lollipop"
74. "Who Am I to Say"
75. "Helper"
76. "It's All in Your Head"
77. "Slack Alice"
78. "Song for Ernest"
79. "12 LB Toothbrush"
80. "Don't Throw Stones"
81. "Suspicious Minds"
82. "Live Work & Play"
83. "Black Stockings for Chelsea"
84. "Perhaps"
85. "Oh Mama No"
86. "Strangers on a Train"
87. "Stop the Baby Talking"
88. "Who Listens to the Radio"
89. "Wedding Ring"
90. "How Come All Night Long"
91. "Snatch It Back and Hold It"
92. "Booze Is Bad News Blues"
93. "Hound Dog Bust"
94. "Black & Blue"
95. "Dust My Broom"
96. "My Arse Is Black with Bourke St"
97. "Black & Blue"
98. "32-20 Blues"
99. "I Remember When I Was Young"
100. "Summertime Summertime"
101. "At the Hop"
102. "Diana"
103. "This Little Girl"
104. "Be My Little Schoolgirl"
105. "Get a Job"
106. "Little Sister"
107. "C'mon Let's Do It"
108. "Teenager in Love"
109. "Looking for an Echo"
110. "On the Prowl"
111. "Goodnight Well It's Time to Go"
112. "Jam"
113. " Suburban Boy" (featuring Dave Warner)
114. "Roll Over Beethoven"
115. "Heading in the Right Direction"
116. "Do You Know What I Mean"
117. "Mighty Rock"
118. "Stand By Me"
119. "Johnny B Goode"
120. "Whole Lotta Shakin' Goin On"
121. Michael Gudinski Speech
122. "She Took My Heart"
123. "Nice Legs Shame about the Face"
124. "Death to Disco"
125. "Other Places"
126. "Wrong World"
