= Fiveslivejive =

Studio album by Ol' 55
- Released: September 1977
- Recorded: 17 June 1977
- Studio: Festival Studios, Sydney
- Genre: Blues rock; rock; pop rock
- Label: Mushroom Records
- Producer: Charles Fisher, John Sayers

Ol' 55 chronology
Take It Greasy (1976)	Fiveslivejive (1977)	Cruisin' for a Bruisin' (1978)

Fiveslivejive is the second studio album to be released by Australian band Ol' 55. The album was recorded in one day at Festival Studios in Sydney on 17 June 1977. The album was released in September 1977 and peaked at number 81 on the Australian Kent Music Report.

== Track listing ==
Side one
No.	Title	Writer(s)	Length
1.	"Shout Shout"	Ernie Maresca	3:12
2.	"Diana"	Paul Anka	3:59
3.	"Be My Little Schoolgirl"	Paul Winley	2:07
4.	"High School Confidential"	Ron Hargrave, Jerry Lee Lewis	4:29
5.	"Love of My Life"	Felice and Boudleaux Bryant	2:38
6.	"Do You Wanna Dance"	Bobby Freeman	2:59
7.	"On the Prowl"	Jimmy Manzie	3:13

Side two
No.	Title	Writer(s)	Length
1.	"Roll Over Beethoven"	Chuck Berry	4:20
2.	"Pretty Little Angel Eyes"	Curtis Lee, Boyce and Hart	2:33
3.	"Caught in the Curl"	Manzie	2:45
4.	"Runaround Sue (Sue Never Ran Around Like This)"	Dion DiMucci, Ernie Maresca	1:47
5.	"The Wilde Man"	Manzie	4:30
6.	"C'mon Let's Do It"	Manzie, Glenn A. Baker	2:44
7.	"Looking for an Echo"	Richard Reicheg	4:57

== Charts ==
Chart (1977)	Position
Australian Kent Music Report	81
