= Feels Like Summer =

Feels Like Summer may refer to:

- "Feels Like Summer" (Childish Gambino song), 2018
- "Feels Like Summer" (Weezer song), 2017
- "Feels Like Summer", a song by Tim Wheeler from the film Shaun the Sheep Movie
- "Feels Like Summer", a song by Panama Wedding from their 2014 EP Parallel Play
- "Feels Like Summer", a song by Vince Staples from the 2018 album FM!

== See also ==
- "(Feels Like a) Summer's Night", a 1978 single by Ol' 55
