= Screen memory (disambiguation) =

A screen memory is a distorted memory, generally of a visual rather than verbal nature.

Screen memory or screen memories may also refer to:

- Screen Memory (album), a 1981 album by MEO 245
- Screen Memories (album), a 2017 album by John Maus
- Screen Memories, 2000 album by the alternative rock band Zabrinski
