= Jeff Cripps =

Jeff Cripps is an Australian recording engineer and award winning music producer, recording over 300 Albums, both for many local bands within New South Wales as well as throughout Australia and internationally. Many see him solely as a producer of blues music (because of the many blues related awards he has received) though he can and has recorded many styles for a variety of bands. Jeff almost always works out of the ASharp Recording Studio in Sydney, NSW though he also does large amounts of live events, playing and mixing.

Over the years Jeff has worked with and produced works for several big bands and artists including The Vines, Fred Smith, Disney (Discovering Nimo) The Wolverines, Mortal Sin, Anglican Youth Works, Cursed Legacy, Throwdown, The D4, James Blundell Ray Beadle, The Atlantics and John Da Silva. He has also worked on various other regional and international projects including producing the soundtrack for the movie Garage Days and producing the official AFL songs.

He now is the guitarist, songwriter and vocalist of the band Mississippi Shakedown and was previously the drummer in the band Ol' 55. The Fifty's, The Cadillacs, John Paul Young, The Marc Hunter Band, Col Joye, Jackie" Orszáczky, The Atlantics,

== Awards ==
As a reflection of his work Jeff Cripps has received numerous music awards, some of which include:

- Goulburn Music Festival: producer of the year in 2003 2005 and 2006, Album of the Year 2003, Album of the Year 1999
- Aust Blues Music Awards: Producer of the Year 2005, Female Vocalist of the Year 2001
- Italian Song Festival: Best Song
- Country Music Australian Awards: Gold Guitar 2004

Jeff is also a former owner of A Sharp Studio audio engineer at ASharp Recording Studio in Sydney. Jeff now lives in Cairns Australia and is a member of Mississippi Shakedown.
