= Frankie J. Holden =

Australian actor and singer

Frankie J. Holden OAM
- Born: Peter Brian; 18 December 1952 (age 73); Australia
- Other name: Frank Holden
- Occupations: Singer; actor; television presenter; business owner
- Years active: 1976–present
- Spouse: Michelle Pettigrove

Frankie J. Holden (born Peter Brian; 18 December 1952), also known as Frank Holden, is an Australian singer, actor and TV presenter. In the 1970s, he fronted Ol' 55, which had a hit with "On the Prowl" from their debut album, Take It Greasy which peaked at number three on the Australian Kent Music Report Albums Chart in 1976. For Return Home Holden was nominated for Best Actor in a Lead Role at the 1990 AFI Awards.

== Singing career ==
During the 1970s, Holden was the frontman for the Australian retro-rock band Ol' 55, which also included Wilbur Wilde and Jimmy Manzie. In the early 2000s, Holden re-emerged on the music scene with the Ol' Skydaddies, a band featuring members from Ol' 55, Daddy Cool and Skyhooks.

== Television career ==
=== Actor ===
In the 1980s, Holden appeared in two episodes of Channel Ten's drama series Prisoner (1982–1983), all episodes of c/o The Bartons and in 1989 was cast in the first season of the Channel 7 children's program Round the Twist (1990).

In 1990, Holden appeared in the Australian caper film The Big Steal as a used car salesman named "Frank" and as Arthur 'Ozzie' Oswald in The Flying Doctors.

In the early 1990s, he appeared in four episodes on the Seven Network's A Country Practice, and in 1992 starred in the short-lived Late for School.

He then played Senior Sergeant Glenn "Spider" Webb on the ABC's Police Rescue (1994–1996). The series was about the New South Wales Police Rescue Squad based in Sydney.

In 1996 he appeared in four episodes on Seven's police drama Blue Heelers as Senior Detective Jack Woodley. In 1999, he appeared in an episode of Halifax f.p..

From 2000 until 2002, he played ex-cop, then local publican, Stuart McGregor in ABC1's Something in the Air. This series was notable for its high output, producing 320 episodes in just two seasons.

In 2008, Holden was in two Nine Network dramas – Underbelly and The Strip.

In 2013, Holden joined the cast of Seven's A Place to Call Home, a drama set in rural Australia in the 1950s. He plays the part of Roy Briggs, described as "a rugged, unbreakable man capable of charm, good humour as well as a crusty grumpiness".

In 2022, Holden played the role of Ted Grimley, father of Melissa Caddick, in the Nine Network drama Underbelly: Vanishing Act.

=== Presenter ===
From 1996 until 1998, Holden was the host of the revamped Monday evening variety show In Melbourne Tonight, co-featuring Julia Morris and Denise Drysdale. For the show's second year, he switched from being billed as 'Frankie J Holden' to 'Frank Holden'.

In 2009, Holden co-presented, alongside his wife Michelle, Discover Downunder, a half-hour Australia-based travelling/caravanning program for the Nine Network. In 2010, he co-hosted What's Up Down Under on Channel Seven. This show is similar in format to Discover Downunder.

== Film ==
Frankie Holden has starred in films as recent as 2007 with Clubland. He was also in Proof, The Big Steal, Return Home, Evil Angels and High Tide. He also had a cameo appearance in Michael Thornhill's 1977 movie The FJ Holden.

== Recording career ==
Working with producers Charles Fisher, James Manzie and arranger Bob Taylor, Holden recorded "My Right of Way". Backed with "Chartered Accountant Blues", it was released on Mushroom Records in 1977.

Working with producer, Holden recorded the Mick Finn composition "Boomerang". It was backed with his own composition "Dinkie Di (Bob's Your Uncle)" and released on the 7 Records label in 1980.

== Filmography ==
=== Film ===
Year	Title	Role	Notes
2011	Blood Brothers	Henry	TV movie
2007	Introducing the Dwights (aka Clubland)	John	Feature film
1995	Cody: The Tipoff	Jimmy Cotter	TV movie
1994	Ebbtide	Ernie	Feature film
1994	Fortunes of War	Rodger Crawley	Feature film
1993	The Leaving of Liverpool	Bunger	TV movie
1993	Hammers Over the Anvil	Bushman Marshall	Feature film
1992	Eight Ball	Mal	Feature film
1991	Rose Against the Odds	Tom Price	TV movie
1991	Proof	Brian	Feature film
1990	The Big Steal	Frank	Feature film
1990	Return Home	Steve	Feature film
1990	Police Crop: The Winchester Conspiracy	Max Chapman	TV movie
1989	The Humpty Dumpty Man	Noel Calderwood	Film
1988	Raw Silk	Detective	TV movie
1988	Evil Angels (aka A Cry in the Dark)	Leslie Thompson	Feature film
1988	Outback Bound	Purdy	TV movie
1980	The Chain Reaction	Farts	Feature film
1979	The Journalist	Investigator	Feature film
1979	Cathy's Child	Detective Plummer	Feature film
1979	The Odd Angry Shot	Spotted Soldier	Feature film
1977	The FJ Holden	Frankie J Holden	Feature film

=== Television ===
Year	Title	Role	Notes
202?	Love, Tea, Epiphany	Stanley	
2022	Underbelly: Vanishing Act	Ted Grimley	TV miniseries, 2 episodes
2019–20	Home and Away	Ian Shaw	TV series, 10 episodes
2013–18	A Place to Call Home	Roy Briggs	TV series, 66 episodes
2010	Sleuth 101	Kyle	TV series, 1 episode
2010	What's Up Down Under	Co-presenter	TV series
2009	Discover Downunder	Co-presenter	TV series
2009	All Saints	Andy McKenzie	TV series, 1 episode
2008	The Strip	Max Nielson	TV series, 13 episodes
2008	Underbelly	Garry Butterworth	TV miniseries, 13 episodes
2006	Lost and Found	Kilroy	
2004	Stingers	Mitch	TV series, 1 episode
2000–02	Something in the Air	Stuart McGregor	TV series, 320 episodes
1999	Chuck Finn	Syd	TV series, 1 episode
1999	Halifax f.p.	Leo Birse	TV series, 1 episode
1997	Good Guys, Bad Guys	Sgt Brann	TV series, 1 episode
1996–04	Blue Heelers	Terry Kennedy / Jack Woodley	TV series, 5 episodes
1996–98	In Melbourne Tonight	Host	TV series
1994	Sky Trackers	Mal	TV series, 1 episode
1994	Under the Skin	Mr Reid	TV series, 1 episode
1993–96	Police Rescue	Senior Sergeant Glenn 'Spider' Webb / Eric Temple	TV series, 20 episodes
1993	Neighbours	David	TV series, 4 episodes
1991–93	A Country Practice	Jack / Malcolm	TV series, 4 episodes
1992	Bony	Croft	TV series, 1 episode
1991	Kelly	Landers	TV series, 1 episode
1991	The Miraculous Mellops	Narrator	TV series, 19 episodes
1991	The Flying Doctors	Arthur 'Ozzie' Oswald	TV series, 1 episode
1991	Boys from the Bush	Danno	TV series, 1 episode
1990–92	Embassy	Terry Blake	TV series, 36 episodes
1990	Col'n Carpenter	Graham	TV series, 1 episode
1989	Round the Twist	Mr Gribble / Foxy	TV series, 11 episodes
1988	Rafftery's Blues	Quiz	TV series, 1 episode
1988	C/o The Bartons	Robert Barton	TV series, 12 episodes
1987	John and the Missus	Nish Morris	Feature film
1987	Hey Dad...!	Have a Go Judge	TV series, 1 episode
1983–84	Carson's Law	Various	TV series, 4 episodes
1984	Special Squad		TV series, 1 episode
1982-83	Prisoner	Brad / Errol	TV series, 2 episodes
1982	The Sullivans	KO Carter	TV series, 1 episode
1982	The Daryl Somers Show	Man Playing Pool	TV series, 1 episode

== Personal life ==
Holden married his first wife Leigh Hunter in the mid seventies, divorcing in the early 80s. He had 3 daughters from his second marriage, to dancer Melda Rees, who died in 1997 from cancer. He married actress Michelle Pettigrove two years later. They have had one daughter together.

Holden currently resides on the Sapphire Coast of New South Wales Australia and is still performing around Australia as a successful entertainer.

In 2010, Frankie and Michelle, with two other couples, purchased Tathra Beachside, a seaside holiday park in Tathra, NSW.

== Honours ==
In 2016, Holden was awarded the Medal of the Order of Australia, in the 2016 Queens Birthday Honours List, for service to the arts as an entertainer, and to the community of the Sapphire Coast.

Frankie J. Holden has a star in Caloundra's "Walk of Stars" between Red Symons and Daryl Somers.

== Popular culture ==
A caricature of Frankie J. Holden appears in the animation Hyper Parsnip Bitches by animator Paul Robertson.

== Solo Discography ==
=== Singles ===
List of singles, with selected chart positions
Year	Title	Peak chart positions	Album
Year	Title	AUS	Album
1977	"My Right of Way"	90	FJ Holden
1977	"Rock Around the Clock" (with Glenn Shorrock, John Paul Young, Renée Geyer, Daryl Braithwaite and Graeme Strachan)	-	non album single
1980	"Boomerang"	-	non album single
