= Chirpin' =

Studio album by the Persuasions
- Released: 1977
- Recorded: 1977
- Genre: A capella, R&B
- Length: 34:22
- Label: Elektra
- Producer: David Dashev

The Persuasions chronology
More Than Before (1974)	Chirpin' (1977)	Comin' at Ya (1979)

Chirpin' is an album by the American musical group the Persuasions, released in 1977. It was rereleased in 1990, following the success of the PBS documentary Spike Lee & Company: Do It a Cappella.

== Production ==
The album was produced by David Dashev. After two albums that contained instrumental accompaniment, Chiripin' was a return to an a capella style, albeit without member Jayotis Washington.

== Critical reception ==
Professional ratings
Review scores
Source	Rating
AllMusic	4.5/5 stars
Christgau's Record Guide	B+
The Encyclopedia of Popular Music	4/4 stars
The Rolling Stone Record Guide	5/5 stars

The Richmond Times-Dispatch praised the "rich, gutsy and romantic harmonies," and considered Chirpin' the group's best album.

Greil Marcus, in The Village Voice, wrote of "Willie and Laura Mae Jones": "'That was another place, and another time,' runs the last line of Tony Joe White’s chorus; as the Persuasions sing it, it is full of dignity, close to bitter, and empty of regret. I don’t know that I have heard new black music this strong since the days that followed Sly Stone’s There’s a Riot Goin’ On." He later listed the album as one of the ten best of the 1970s.

== Track listing ==
Side 1

1. "Papa Oom Mow Mow" (Al Frazier, Carl White, Turner Wilson, John Harris) – 2:18
2. "Willie and Laura Mae Jones" (Tony Joe White) – 3:15
3. "Moonlight and Music" (Leroy Fann) – 3:00
4. "Johnny Porter" (Bobby Ray Appleberry, Bill Cuomo) – 4:34
5. "Looking for an Echo" (Richard Reicheg) – 4:11

Side 2

6. "Women and Drinkin'" (Jerry Lawson, David Dashev) – 6:53
7. "Sixty Minute Man" (Billy Ward) – 2:00
8. "Win Your Love (For Me)" (Sam Cooke) – 3:32
9. "It's Gonna Rain Again" (Charles Johnson) – 2:22
10. "To Be Loved" (Tyran Carlo, Gwen Gordy Fuqua, Berry Gordy)– 2:32

== Details ==
- Produced by David Dashev.
- Recorded and mixed at The Hit Factory, New York.
- Engineered by Michael Getlin.
- Released in 1977 by Elektra.
