= Cruisin' for a Bruisin' (Ol' 55 album) =

Studio album by Ol' 55
- Released: November 1978
- Studio: 7 Records Pty Limited
- Genre: Rock & roll, pop rock
- Label: Junction Records
- Producer: Charles Fisher

Ol' 55 chronology
Fiveslivejive (1977)	Cruisin' for a Bruisin' (1978)	Greasemarks: Greatest Hits 1976–79 (1980)

Singles from Cruisin' for a Bruisin'
- 1. "Stay (While the Night Is Still Young)" / "Caught in the Curl" Released: November 1977; 2. "(Feels Like a) Summer's Night" / "He's Gotta Go" Released: March 1978; 3. "Time for Rock 'n' Roll" / "Homework's Done" Released: October 1978; 4. "Ruby" / "Nobody Should Be Kissing My Baby" Released: December 1978; 5. "Living for Your Smile" / "The Shaggy English Sheepdog Shake" Released: April 1979; 6. "Comic Book World" / "Peek-a-Boo!" Released: 18 February 1980

Cruisin' for a Bruisin' was the third studio album to be released by Australian band Ol' 55. The album was released in November 1978 and peaked at number 40 on the Australian Kent Music Report.

== Track listing ==
Side one (Stax of Wax I)
No.	Title	Writer(s)	Length
1.	"Cars & Girls"	Jimmy Manzie	3:00
2.	"Time to Rock 'n' Roll"	Manzie	2:51
3.	"Living for Your Smile"	Manzie	3:15
4.	"I'll Be Her Lover, Saturday Night"	Manzie	2:39
5.	"The Shaggy English Sheepdog Shake"	Manzie	3:00
6.	"Ruby"	Jerry Leiber, Mike Stoller	2:49

Side two (Stax of Wax II)
No.	Title	Writer(s)	Length
1.	"Stay (While the Night Is Still Young)"	Manzie	4:09
2.	"(Feels Like a) Summer's Night"	Manzie	3:50
3.	"Peek-a-Boo!"	Jack Hamer	2:07
4.	"Nobody Should Be Kissing My Baby"	Manzie	3:06
5.	"The Way to Fall in Love (Book II)"	Manzie	2:38
6.	"Comic Book World"	Manzie	3:10

== Charts ==
Chart (1978/79)	Position
Australian Kent Music Report	40
