= Ol' 55 (band) =

Australian band

Ol'55
- Origin: Sydney, New South Wales, Australia
- Genres: Rock and roll, doo wop
- Years active: 1974–1983, 1986–1989, 2018–present
- Members: Rockpile Jones; Jimmy Manzie; Patrick "Meatballs" Drummond; Frankie J. Holden; Wilbur Wilde; Freddie Strauks.
- Past members: see Members list below

Ol' 55 are an Australian band specialising in retro, 1950s-era Rock 'n' Roll. They formed as Fanis in 1972 in Sutherland, Sydney. Drummer Geoff Plummer was working with Glenn A. Baker at the NSW Department of Media and invited Baker to hear his part-time band, including Patrick "Meatballs" Drummond, Rockpile Jones and Jimmy Manzie. In 1975, Baker took on their management, renamed them as Ol' 55 for the Tom Waits song, and recruited front man Frankie J. Holden and, later in the year, saxophonist Wilbur Wilde.

The band enjoyed popularity with a style that bordered on parody but managed to combine novelty retro kitsch and clever theatrics with a keen sense of pop dynamics and an acute understanding of rock 'n' roll. The band scored five top 20 hits on the Australian Kent Music Report singles chart and their debut album, Take It Greasy peaked at No. 3 on the Australian albums chart in 1976. After line-up changes, Ol' 55 disbanded in 1983.

== History ==
Fanis, was a part-time covers band formed in 1972 in Sutherland, Sydney with Patrick "Meatballs" Drummond on lead guitar and vocals, Rockpile Jones on rhythm guitar and vocals, Jimmy Manzie on keyboards then bass guitar, Paul McCann bass guitar, and Geoff Plummer on drums. Plummer worked as a public servant for the NSW Postmaster-General's Department (PMG) in the Department of Media alongside, future rock music journalist, Glenn A. Baker and invited Baker to hear the band. In 1975, Baker took on their management, he introduced former chartered accountant, Peter Brian—who performed as Frankie J. Holden—on lead vocals. Fanis was renamed as OL' 55 for the Tom Waits song—as covered by the Eagles in 1974.

The early 1975 line-up of Plummer, Drummond, Jones, Manzie, McCann and Holden played their first gig at the Grange Disco in Pitt Street Sydney on 4 July 1975; with a residency at French's Tavern, Oxford Street, Sydney. In September they released their debut single as a double A-side with a Paul Anka cover "Diana" backed with The Spaniels' "Goodnight Sweetheart" on Mushroom Records. The single was a minor hit in Sydney, and peaked into the Australian Kent Music Report Singles Top 100 Chart.

In October 1975, Nick Aitken, as Wilbur Wilde (ex-Ray Brown & The Whispers), joined the line-up on saxophone. In May 1976, Ol' 55's second single, "On the Prowl", launched them into the Kent Music Report Top 20. It was an original song written by bass guitarist, Manzie. The group released their debut studio album Take It Greasy, in May 1976 which peaked at No. 3 on the Australian Kent Music Report Albums Chart, eventually achieving triple platinum status and staying in the Top 50 charts for 39 weeks. Two more Top 20 hit singles, "Looking for an Echo" and "(I Want a) Rockin' Christmas", followed in 1976. The next year the track “skateboard thrills” was used in the documentary “highway one.” Plummer left in January 1977 and was replaced on drums by Geoff "Spud" Peterkin (ex-Springwater). In January 1977, the band's released "C'mon Let's Do It" which reached the top 30.

Ol'55 made regular appearances on Australian Broadcasting Corporation (ABC) TV's pop music series, Countdown and at music concerts and festivals. They were often billed with fellow Mushroom Records groups Skyhooks and Ted Mulry Gang as well as other notable acts AC/DC and Sherbet. Their first international support was for Electric Light Orchestra at Sydney's Hordern Pavilion.

In April 1977, Holden released his debut solo single, "My Right of Way", co-written by Baker and Manzie, which was used as the theme for the Australian movie The FJ Holden for which Manzie also wrote all the original music. Holden left the band in May to pursue his solo career, he was followed one month later by Wilde who joined Jo Jo Zep & The Falcons. Both Holden and Wilde furthered their musical careers and also took roles in television entertainment.

In August 1977, Ol' 55 unveiled its re-vamped line-up with new singer Mike Raffone (aka Paul Stevens, ex-Silver Studs). The band's second album, Fiveslivejive, was released in September and peaked at number 81. "Stay (While the Night Is Still Young)", made it to No. 16 in November. Bruce "Tangles" Allen joined on saxophone in January 1978 but by February 1978, Raffone had left. Continuing as a five-piece with Drummond, Jones and Manzie sharing lead vocals, they released "(Feels Like a) Summer's Night" which featured a more contemporary power pop sound and peaked in the Top 50 after its release in March 1978.

In October 1978, "Time to Rock 'n' Roll" was released but failed to chart and the third album Cruisin' for a Bruisin' (released on the Junction label through Seven Records) peaked at number 40. "Ruby" returned Ol' 55 to the national Top 40 in February 1979 followed by "Living for Your Smile" in April which did not chart. A split in the band had developed, Manzie wanted to steer them into a more power pop oriented direction while Drummond and Jones wanted to continue with the retro Rock & Roll vein. Guitarists, Drummond and Jones retained the rights to the name Ol' 55, and recruited original drummer Plummer, and added Terry Bellew(ex-Hotrox Band)on bass guitar and Robert "Bad Bob Tawney" Drummond on guitar; Geoff Plummer left in July 1980 and was replaced by Doug Martyn on drums and vocals. They signed a deal with (Leo Recorders released through Polydor)RCA by year's end. Meanwhile, Manzie, Peterkin and Allen formed a contemporary power pop group, The Breakers (1979–1982), with Scott Douglas on guitar and vocals, Martin Fisher (ex-The Innocents) on keyboards and synthesiser, and Jarryl Wirth (ex-News) on guitar.

Ol' 55 released the unsuccessful "Comic Book World" in February 1980 and followed by a final Top 20 hit, their version of Lou Christie's "Two Faces Have I" released in October, which reached No. 15 nationally. It was followed by "Anywhere the Girls Are" in December. Their fourth studio album, The Vault, was released in December 1980. The band folded in late 1983 and made a short revival in 1986.

Subsequently, various revivals titled Ol' 55, The Fives, Frankie J. Holden & The Fives, Ol' Skydaddys, On The Prowl, Legends of Ol'55, and Take It Greasy were formed which contained members of the 1976 line-up of the band and played their material.

== Music and style ==
After 1975 when Fanis had become OL' 55, under Baker's guidance, they developed a style that bordered on parody, but managed to combine novelty retro kitsch and clever theatrics with a keen sense of pop dynamics and an acute understanding of rock 'n' roll. The band dressed in authentic 1950s rocker gear and mixed vintage material with originals—mostly written by bass guitarist, Manzie.

Due to the retro nature of the band, some of their hits came from remakes of 1950s-styled tunes. These included Paul Anka's "Diana" (1957), The Spaniels' "Goodnite, Sweetheart, Goodnite" (1954), Dion and the Belmonts' "Why Must I Be a Teenager in Love?" (1959), "Ruby", Lou Christie's "Two Faces Have I" (1963) and Kenny Vance's "Looking for an Echo" (1975). OL' 55 also wrote and performed original songs, "On the Prowl", "Skateboard Thrills", "Stay (While the Night Is Still Young)", "(Feels Like a) Summer's Night", and "Time to Rock 'n' Roll", were all composed by Manzie, while "(I Want a) Rockin' Christmas", and "C'mon Let's Do It", were co-written with Baker.

One of the features of the band was that most members were talented at singing and at concerts the lead vocals were shared, between mainly Holden and Jones, although Jones sang the majority of the songs in 1977–1986. Jones with a falsetto and broad range was one of the under-rated vocalists in Australian rock music history. With Geoff's bass vocal talents, OL' 55 produced complex harmonies, sometimes managing four or five piece vocal arrangements.

== Post Ol' 55 ==
Manzie and Peterkin formed a contemporary power pop band called The Breakers in 1979. They were described by rock historian, Ian McFarlane as "Heavy metal pop that combined Beach Boys style vocals with Ramones guitar riffs and Buggles synthesisers". The Breakers released a single, "When I'm on TV", in August 1980 and broke up by 1982. Manzie initially concentrated on production duties for Choirboys, The Innocents, Men of Harlech, Affections and The Fabulous Beagles.

In 1982 (Australia Day weekend at Sidney Myer Music Bowl, Melbourne), Holden, Jones, Manzie, Plummer, Wilde and "guitarist for hire" Gunther Gorman reconvened as The Fives to appear at the Mushroom Evolution Concert to celebrate the label's 10th anniversary. Three tracks from the band appeared on the live triple LP album of the event (subsequently released on VHS, DVD(LIBDVD1098), CD and now iTunes). The most successful line-up also reformed for the Mushroom 25th Anniversary concert in 1997 and tracks were included in the VHS, DVD and CD releases. Since then, there have been many re-formations under the monikers of OL' 55, Frankie J Holden and the Fives and in the mid-1990s, Ol' Skydaddys, On The Prowl, Legends of OL'55, Take It Greasy. They have reformed at special occasions such as Carols by Candlelight, and for a series of gigs in Sydney and Melbourne.

Patrick "Meatballs" Drummond lives in Hobart, Tasmania and is married with children. Holden lives on the south coast of NSW and is married with 5 daughters. He pursued an acting career and was also host of IMT (In Melbourne Tonight). In 2008, Holden appeared in the crime series Underbelly and currently A Place To Call Home. Jones lived in Sydney and was married with two sons, and continued to play and sing with bands as well as solo gigs, and died on 6 October, 2026, aged 74. Manzie lived in Hollywood, he writes film music—mainly for horror movies, and produces recordings for bands and has a partner and three children, Jackson, Alexandra and Clive. Peterkin lives in Pakenham Victoria, is married with 2 sons, plays and records music and is an audiovisual producer. Wilde was a regular of the Hey Hey It's Saturday house band from the mid-1980s until the show's demise. He lives in Melbourne and has 4 children, including twins. Jeff "Walk The Plank" Cripps went on to work in The Fiftys with John Charter 1988–89. He then became a sought-after and awarded music producer and sound engineer with his A Sharp Studio in Sydney from 1988 to 2016. He has played in his own band Mississippi Shakedown since 1995, self-publishing around 10 albums and resides in Cairns.

Geoff "Drainpipe" Plummer died on 2 February 2006, leaving behind his wife Sandra and four children Sharne, Malory, Myles and Oliver.

== Members ==
- Patrick "Meatballs" Drummond – guitar, vocals (1975–1986)
- Rockpile Jones – guitar, vocals (1975–1983, 1986, 2001)
- Jimmy Manzie – keyboards, bass guitar, vocals (1975–1979)
- Geoff Plummer – drums, vocals (1975–1977, 1979–1980, 1986, 2001)
- Paul McCann – bass guitar (1975)
- Frankie J. Holden – vocals (1975–1977)
- Wilbur Wilde – tenor saxophone, vocals (1975–1977)
- Geoff "Spud" Peterkin – drums, vocals (1977–1979)
- Paul "Mike Raffone" Stevens – vocals (1977–1978)
- Bruce "Tangles" Allen – saxophone, vocals (1978–1980)
- Rigel Best – upright double bass (1978)
- Robert "Bob Tawny" Drummond – guitar (1979–1983)
- Terry Bellew – bass guitar, vocals (1979–1983, 1986)
- Doug Martyn – drums, vocals (24/7/1980–24/7/1982)
- Jeff Cripps – drums, vocals (1983–85)
- Mark Simmons – sax (1975, 1986)
- Jimmy Hill – drums, vocals (1989)
- Rowland Moye - sax, keys, vocals (1986–1989)

== Discography ==
=== Studio albums ===
Title	Album details	Peak chart positions	Certifications
Title	Album details	AUS	Certifications
Take It Greasy	Released: May 1976; Format: LP; Label: Mushroom Records (L 35815)	3	AUS: 3× platinum
Fiveslivejive	Released: September 1977; Format: LP; Label: Mushroom Records (L 36287)	81	
Cruisin' for a Bruisin'	Released: November 1978; Format: LP; Label: Junction Records (MLF 234)	40	
The Vault	Released: December 1980; Format: LP; Label: Leo Records (2907 501)	41	
Let's have a party! - Live	Released: December 1983; Format: Cassette Tape; Label: Independent Release (Recorded live in the studio with a small audience. Limited edition release sold at gigs)		
Open Top Cars & Girls in Tight T-Shirts	Released: 1986; Format: LP; Label: J&B Records (JB 266)	-	
Should'a Been Here Yesterday	Released: 2001; Format: CD; Label: Independent Release (limited edition release sold at gigs)	-	

=== Compilation albums ===
Title	Album details	Peak chart positions
Title	Album details	AUS
Greasemarks: Greatest Hits 1976–79	Released: 1980; Format: LP; Label: K-tel Records, Mushroom Records (NA561)	-
Time to Rock 'n' Roll: The Anthology	Released: 26 August 2016; Format: CD, Digital download; Label: Festival Records (FEST601048)	21

=== Singles ===
Year	Title	Peak chart positions	Album
Year	Title	AUS	Album
1975	"Diana" / "Goodnight, Sweetheart"	95	non-album single
1976	"On the Prowl" / "This Little Girl"	14	Take It Greasy
1976	"Looking for an Echo"	9	Take It Greasy
1976	"(I Want a) Rockin' Christmas"	7	single only
1977	"C'mon Let's Do It" / "Teenager in Love"	24	single only
1977	"Stay (While the Night Is Young)"	16	Cruisin' for a Bruisin'
1978	"(Feels Like a) Summer's Night"	50	Cruisin' for a Bruisin'
1978	"Time for Rock 'n' Roll"	-	Cruisin' for a Bruisin'
1978	"Ruby"	36	Cruisin' for a Bruisin'
1979	"Living for Your Smile"	98	Cruisin' for a Bruisin'
1980	"Comic Book World"	-	Cruisin' for a Bruisin'
1980	"Two Faces Have I"	15	The Vault
1980	"Anywhere the Girls Are"	67	The Vault
1981	"Ol' 55 on 45 Medley"	-	single only
1983	"My Little Sister, The Twister"	-	single only
