= Michelle Pettigrove =

Australian actress

- Born: 19 July 1966 (age 60)
- Occupations: Actress, television presenter
- Known for: A Country Practice
- Notable work: Brides of Christ (miniseries)
- Spouse: Frankie J. Holden
- Children: 1

Michelle Pettigrove (born 19 July 1966) is an Australian actress, well known for her role as alternative medicine nursing sister Kate Bryant in the long-running rural soap opera A Country Practice. She had appeared in the series in a guest role previously, and was brought back in 1991 to play the permanent role of new nurse Sister Bryant

Pettigrove has also appeared in several other series, including Blue Heelers, Home and Away (in 3 different roles), Something in the Air, Silversun and the mini-series Brides of Christ.

Pettigrove is married to actor and singer Frankie J. Holden, with whom she has one daughter, Georgia Rose, who appeared in the final night of blind auditions of The Voice 2022. They both now work on travel shows, particularly those dedicated to camping and caravanning, and are part owners at Tathra Beachside (Caravan Park). She is an ambassador for ChildFund (formerly Christian Children's Fund), and sponsored a boy in Zambia from 1997. She is now sponsoring a girl in Cambodia.

== Filmography ==
=== TV Series ===
- 1988, Rafferty's Rules as Libby Carroll, 1 episode
- 1990, Shadows of the Heart as Clara Bannet, 2 episodes
- 1991, Brides of Christ as Sister Francine, 6 episodes
- 1988–1994, A Country Practice as Sister Kate Bryant, Mary O'Connor, 231 episodes
- 1997, Big Sky as Stacey, 1 episode
- 1998, Blue Healers as Janet Shaw, 1 episode
- 2001–2002, Something in the Air as Sarah Priory, 9 episodes
- 2004, Silversun as Dr. Lillian Reiss, 26 episodes
