= On the Prowl (song) =

Single by Ol' 55

from the album Take It Greasy
- B-side: "This Little Girl"
- Released: May 1976
- Recorded: 1976
- Studio: Trafalgar Studios, Sydney
- Genre: Blues Rock, Classic Rock
- Length: 2:59
- Label: Mushroom Records
- Songwriter(s): Jimmy Manzie
- Producer(s): Charles Fisher

Ol' 55 singles chronology
"Diana/Goodnite, Sweetheart" (1975)	"On the Prowl" (1976)	"Looking for an Echo" (1976)

"On the Prowl" is a song written by Jimmy Manzie and recorded by Australian band Ol' 55. The song was released in May 1976 as the lead single from the band's debut studio album, Take It Greasy (1976). The song peaked at number 14 on the Australian Kent Music Report, becoming the band's first top 50 single.

== Track listing ==
7" (K-6587)

- Side A "On the Prowl" – 2:59
- Side B "This Little Girl" – 2:39

== Charts ==
=== Weekly charts ===
Weekly chart performance for "On the Prowl"
Chart (1976)	Peak position
Australia (Kent Music Report)	14

=== Year-end charts ===
Year-end chart performance for "On the Prowl"
Chart (1976)	Position
Australia (Kent Music Report)	97
