= Cask J. Thomson =

- Origin: Falkirk, Scotland
- Genres: Progressive rock; Grunge; Progressive metal
- Occupations: Musician songwriter producer author
- Instruments: Vocals, guitar, bass guitar, keyboards, synthesizers
- Years active: 2005–present
- Website: www.cask.zone

Cask J. Thomson is a Scottish-born, Australian-based musician, producer, and designer known for his work in progressive rock and synth-pop. His notable projects include CASK, HELIXIRx, and Empty Triangles. He heads the independent label AudioDefine Records and its sublabel Same Great Sound, which focuses on pop and electronic music. He also runs CASKaudio, providing a range of sample packs, impulse responses, and sound design tools for musicians and producers.

== Biography ==
Born in Falkirk, Scotland, and based in Queensland, Australia, Cask J. Thomson started performing as a teenager and taught himself guitar, keyboards, drums and how to produce music. Initially focusing on analog recording, Thomson wrote and recorded his debut as Cursed Legacy. The album was recorded live to 7" tape with overdubs and tape loops to simulate a multitrack recording. As a result, the album features hiss and audible tape glitches that were left in during mastering by Jeff Cripps in Sydney. The album was distributed in Australia by Festival Mushroom Records and released independently.

Cask J. Thomson is a Scottish-born Australian producer, composer, musician, graphic designer and author

He has released 3 albums as Cask. His latest album "Surviving on Borrowed Time" was released exclusively as Direct Stream Digital in 2019, before releasing in other formats worldwide in December

In August 2020, Thomson premiered synth-pop project HELIXIRx. The first single "Gravity" features on the Spotify editorial playlist "Outrun". The single was streamed over 70,000 times during October and was featured in online coverage of the October SpaceX launch. The debut album Authenticity was released in November.

Thomson is a professional graphic designer and runs a book publishing company. His independent record label AudioDefine Records has released most of his projects as well as that of Dutch pianist Johan Versk

In 2010 Thomson performed as a session guitarist for Sydney band Operator Please and Australian Idol winner Stan Walker during his From the Inside Out promotional tour.

In 2017 he released his first solo album Play it Over and Start Again under Cask. The album features predominantly piano-driven contemporary music but does not stray from the gloomy lyrical and musical content Cursed Legacy features. The first single, "Bedridden (Move Forward)", premiered on Reverbnation where he reached 4th in the Independent Charts followed by a music video for "The Murder".

In July 2018, Cask released "See What Tomorrow Brings". On 1 August 2018 he released his second album, Life is a Terminal Illness. The album received critical acclaim and was released in high resolution Direct Stream Digital Cask released the song "Waited for You" in January 2019 claiming that it was to be used for a future album but "didn't fit".

Cask posted a digital painting on his Instagram in May 2019 with the description "I have news from the conflict zone. 2019. concept album. End transmission". In August, Cask announced the concept album Surviving on Borrowed Time would be released in 2020 The official video and single "Presentiment" premiered after the announcement The album was released exclusively in Direct Stream Digital format in December 2019 before being released worldwide digitally and physically January 2, 2020.

To mark the five-year anniversary of the debut and bridge the gap to the new album, HELIXIRx released a reimagined version of the first record titled authenticity // low_fidelity in July 2025.

Outside of music, Thomson runs an independent book publishing company and operates a design and marketing firm. His UI and logo designs featured on the Linux distribution Ubuntu

Thomson is an extraterrestrial research enthusiast who, under his publishing house, reissued Taken and Into the Fringe by Dr. Karla Turner. He was announced as a speaker at the Close Encounters conferences in 2019.

Thomson's logo "hourglass" features an empty triangle atop a black triangle. The symbol has been used on all of his releases and major contributions since at least 2010. Cask described the symbol as "an important reminder to me that we are always on the clock". Outside of music, Cask has a collection of Saab cars including the "Wasaabi" that was purchased from Australian series Mighty Car Mods Cask is an outspoken privacy advocate and has written a series of articles on his website encouraging people to DeGoogle amidst privacy concerns and personal experience of automated copyright infringement notices triggering his own music accounts.

== Discography ==
=== CASK ===
- Play it Over and Start Again (2017)
- Life is a Terminal Illness (2018)
- Surviving on Borrowed Time (2019)

=== HELIXIRx ===
- Authenticity (2020)

=== Additional Credits ===
- HELIXIRx - Authenticity (Composer, Co-Producer)
- Empty Triangles (Composer, Producer, Mixing Engineer)
  - 1.0 (2021)
  - 2.0 (2021)
  - A New Angle (2023)
  - Glitch in the Geometry (2025)
- Sunsetron - Into the Stratosphere (Performer and Producer)
- ctrl.alt.sleep (Producer)
  - cmd+dream (2026)
