= Think It Over =

Single by the Crickets

from the album The Buddy Holly Story
- B-side: "Fool's Paradise"
- Released: May 27, 1958
- Recorded: February 1958
- Genre: Rock and roll; rockabilly
- Length: 1:45
- Label: Brunswick
- Songwriters: Holly, Petty, Allison
- Producer: Norman Petty

The Crickets singles chronology
"Maybe Baby" (1958)	"Think It Over" (1958)	"It's So Easy!" (1958)

"Think It Over" is a rock-and-roll song written by Buddy Holly, Jerry Allison, and Norman Petty in 1958, originally recorded by the Crickets and released on Brunswick Records. The record was a Top Forty hit in the U.S. and UK in 1958.

Buddy Holly played lead guitar. Vi Petty, producer Norman Petty's wife, played piano on this recording.

== Chart performance ==
In the US, "Think It Over" was released by Brunswick Records as a 45-rpm single (9-55072), reaching number 27 on the Billboard pop singles chart, and number 9 on the Billboard R&B chart. In Canada it reached number 45. Overseas, the song went to number 11 in the UK on Coral Records.

The B side was "Fool's Paradise" written by Horace Linsley, Sonny LeGlaire, and Norman Petty.

== Personnel ==
- Buddy Holly - vocals, lead guitar
- Jerry Allison - drums
- Joe B. Mauldin - bass guitar
- Vi Petty - piano
- The Roses - background vocals
- Norman Petty - producer

== Other recordings ==
The song has been recorded by Bobby Vee, Paul Burch, The Bobby Fuller Four, Mickie Most, Jimmy Gilmer, The Hollies, Skeeter Davis, Gloria Lynne, P.J. Proby, Phil Ochs, Ringo Starr, Mike Berry, Billy Swan, Buzz Cason, David Box, and the Australian band Ol' 55 on their album Take It Greasy (1976).

== Sources ==
- Amburn, Ellis (1996). Buddy Holly: A Biography. St. Martin's Press. ISBN 978-0-312-14557-6.
- Bustard, Anne (2005). Buddy: The Story of Buddy Holly. Simon & Schuster. ISBN 978-1-4223-9302-4.
- Dawson, Jim; Leigh, Spencer (1996). Memories of Buddy Holly. Big Nickel Publications. ISBN 978-0-936433-20-2.
- Gerron, Peggy Sue (2008). Whatever Happened to Peggy Sue? Togi Entertainment. ISBN 978-0-9800085-0-0.
- Goldrosen, John (1975). Buddy Holly: His Life and Music. Popular Press. ISBN 0-85947-018-0.
- Goldrosen, John; Beecher, John (1996). Remembering Buddy: The Definitive Biography. New York: Da Capo Press. ISBN 0-306-80715-7.
- Gribbin, John (2009). Not Fade Away: The Life and Music of Buddy Holly. London: Icon Books. ISBN 978-1-84831-034-6.
