= Silversun =

Australian children's television series

- Genre: Science fiction Adventure
- Created by: Roger Simpson
- Written by: Graeme Farmer; Glen Dolman; Meg Mappin; Kirsty Fisher; Andrew Muir; Rob George; Fiona Wood; Ray Boseley; Jo Martino; Chris Roache
- Directed by: Paul Moloney; Mandy Smith; Pino Amenta
- Starring: Ryan Corr; Cherise Donovan; Angus McLaren; Sarah Walker; Eloise Mignon
- Country of origin: Australia
- Original language: English
- No. of seasons: 2
- No. of episodes: 40

Production
- Executive producers: Mikael Borglund; Claire Henderson
- Producers: Roger Le Mesurier; Chris Roache; Roger Simpson; Andy Walker
- Running time: 22 minutes
- Production companies: Beyond Simpson Le Mesurier; Australian Broadcasting Corporation

Original release
- Network: Seven Network
- Release: 28 June – 1 October 2004

Silversun is a science fiction children's television series made in Australia by the Australian Broadcasting Corporation (ABC). The show features the adventures of the adolescent members of the crew of the Star Runner, an interstellar spaceship carrying a cargo of 550 cryonically suspended colonists ("cryons") to their new home, the Silver Sun.

In the year 2052, the Star Runner and its crew are two years into their 90-year journey to a livable planet 45 light years from Earth. The crew's goal is to get the "New Settlers" safely to the Silver Sun and begin a colony there. Because of the 90-year-length of the journey, the crew are mostly teenagers who will take over command of the Star Runner as the adults get older.

== Cast ==
=== Main cast ===
- Thomas Blackburne as Tane Wilson: A skilled cadet pilot.
- Cleopatra Coleman as Zandie Brokow: A strong-minded, often outspoken ex-cryon crew member of the Star Runner.
- Ryan Corr as Sheng Zammett: A brilliantly minded cadet scientist.
- Karli Dinardo as Cinnamon Everson: Steve and Karen's young daughter.
- Cherise Donovan as Leonella Reiss: A cadet medical officer. Daughter of Lillian.
- Angus McLaren as Degenhardt Bell: A cadet often found in the hold as the caretaker of the cryons.
- Eloise Mignon as Mara Lomax: A cadet medical officer aspiring towards leadership.
- Orpheus Pledger as Tycho Everson: Steve and Karen's young son.
- Sarah Walker as Pancha McCaskill: Cadet computer officer of the Star Runner. Her brain implant gives her a telepathic link to the ship's computer systems.
- Michelle Pettigrove as Doctor Lillian Reiss: Star Runner's chief medical officer, Cyriax's second-in-command and occasionally overprotective mother of Leonella.
- Teague Rook as Steve Everson: Star Runner's stern engineer, husband of Karen and father of Cinnamon and Tycho.
- Yesse Spence as Karen Everson: Star Runner's astronomer and navigator, wife of Steve and mother of Cinnamon and Tycho.
- Jeremy Stanford as Commander Aaron 'Skipper' Cyriax: Commanding officer of the Star Runner.

Additionally, Jeremy Stanford portrays an illusion of himself from an alien virus, and his clone, known as "C2" or "Will Power".

=== Guest cast ===
In order of appearance:

- Joan Murray as Eileen Lomax: Mara's grandmother back on earth. (3 episodes)
- Nathan Vernon as Jarrax Wells: Leonella's ex-boyfriend back on Earth. (1 episode)
- Don Halbert as Interviewer (1 episode, uncredited)
- Tracy Mann as Holophone voice over (2 episodes, credited in 1)
- Victoria Eagger as Commodore Sorenson: A leading figure of the Silver Sun Fleet at Star Command. (1 episode)
- Adrian Mulraney as Commander John Darius: Commanding officer of the Infinity. (2 episodes)
- Michael Harrison as Julian Strega: A highly intelligent cadet pilot serving on board the Infinity. (4 episodes)
  - Anthony Mays as Strega stunt double (1 episode)

== Production ==
The ABC began showing Silversun on 11 October 2004 at 5:00 pm daily as part of its children's lineup. The final episode was broadcast on 3 December 2004. Forty episodes of the program were produced, each at twenty-two minutes. The program was originally aired on the Seven Network in two groups of twenty episodes, and then shown again without a mid-way break on the ABC.

Silversun was re-run on Sunday mornings beginning 3 April 2005, until 1 January 2006. It was rerun again in 2009 each weekday at 5:00 pm, finishing on 17 September 2009. The ABC has no plans to create a second season of the program.

Many episodes revolved around the relationships and issues experienced by the young crew as part of adolescence. Some episodes dealt with issues of ethics and choices unique to science fiction, such as the question of whether the commander's clone should be treated as human or not, the unique human problems encountered by a crew on a lifelong voyage to the stars, and an encounter with a pulsar whose pulse cycle is in phase with the brainwaves of the crewmember Pancha, to her detriment.

Although some first-season episodes are self-contained, the majority deal with multi-episode plot conflicts occurring on board the Star Runner. These included the illegal re-animation of the character Zandie by the rogue crewmember Degenhardt in the earlier episodes, the crew's encounter with a wormhole, the infection of Commander Cyriax by an alien parasite, his subsequent cure through the use of a harvest clone of him discovered in suspension among the settler pods, and the clone's accidental awakening to full consciousness. The final episode ended in a cliffhanger.

== Episodes ==
=== Season 1 ===
No. overall	No. in series	Title	Directed by	Written by	Original release date
1	1	"Alien Presence"	Unknown	Unknown	28 June 2004
The ship has just passed through a solar fog and the crew have to investigate a supposed "alien" on board the ship, but are surprised to find that it's a cat that Tycho had been hiding away for the last two years. The crew is divided over whether to keep the cat or follow protocol and euthanise it, but Mara, who has been suffering from a bit of home sickness after talking with her grandmother, convinces the crew that keeping the cat as a pet would be a good idea. Afterward, the ship's computer begins glitching due to the solar fog and they have to try and download new software from Earth. Guest cast: Joan Murray as Eileen Lomax.
2	2	"Electronic Sheep"	Unknown	Unknown	28 June 2004
Pancha discovers that, since the software fix, she now has a strange telepathic connection with Star Runner's computer and she detects a system failure the computer failed to pick up. Leonella discovers that her boyfriend from Earth, Jarrax, has moved on and is going out with Leonella's best friend on Earth, Drina. Tycho and Cinnamon want more responsibility and want to make different smells come out of the air conditioning system. Guest cast: Nathan Vernon as Jarrax Wells, Tracy Mann as Holophone voice over (uncredited).
3	3	"Meltdown"	Unknown	Unknown	29 June 2004
The problem that Pancha detected turns out to be a potential unfreezing of all the cryons. Luckily, Tane and Mara fix the problem just in time. Sheng creates blockers for Pancha to block out the computer's system, but they work a little too well. To determine whether the cryons are okay, the crew must choose a settler to reanimate and a middle-aged cryonics expert, Dr Flickadello, is chosen. However, Degenhardt has his own ideas of who should be reanimated and Pancha sees Degenhardt purposely putting in the code for a different cryon.
4	4	"Chill Out"	Unknown	Unknown	29 June 2004
The cryon that Degenhardt chose to reanimate in place of Dr Flickadello is a fifteen-year-old girl called Zandie. The crew suspects a fault in the computer system, but Pancha knows what Degenhardt did. Meanwhile, Leonella experiments with gene-splicing flowers that will survive Star Runner's artificial gravity. First appearance of Cleopatra Coleman as Zandie Brokow.
5	5	"Staying Alive"	Unknown	Unknown	30 June 2004
Zandie does not want to be resuspended as a cryon, forming a connection with Degenhardt. When Pancha reveals to Degenhardt that she knows the truth behind Zandie's reanimation, Degenhardt forces her not to tell. As Zandie is staying on board, she is given the task of helping fertilise hydroponically-grown vegetables, but is under suspicion when the latest crop dies. Tane teaches Leonella how to use the punch-bag, and Leonella teaches Tane yoga. Meanwhile, Sheng and Mara try to reverse the plants' failure to grow.
6	6	"Trade Off"	Unknown	Unknown	30 June 2004
Mara finds out about Degenhardt illegally reanimating Zandie and tells Degenhardt to inform Cyriax of what he did. Degenhardt faces a panel to answer questions about what he did. Pancha also has to face the panel for failing to tell the crew about Degenhardt's action. Pancha is let off with no punishment, but Cyriax tells Degenhardt he must choose a punishment for what he did. He chooses to be placed in suspended animation to take Zandie's place. Meanwhile, Zandie is having a difficult time fitting in and lets Degenhardt know how angry she is with him for reanimating her.
7	7	"Frozen Exile"	Unknown	Unknown	1 July 2004
Everyone tries their best to stop Degenhardt from being frozen and they organise a party for him. Zandie thinks Cyriax, by allowing Degenhardt to be placed into suspended animation, is trying to guilt her into returning to suspension. When Tycho and Cinnamon are sent to find Degenhardt, they discover he is missing. After he is found, Cyriax decides to stop Degenhardt from being placed into suspended animation, and the crew have another party to celebrate. Karen and Pancha return to their shift on the bridge only to discover they are on a collision course with an uncharted planet.
8	8	"No Probe-Lemo"	Unknown	Unknown	1 July 2004
The ship is saved from the gravitational pull of the planet they have found and they discover that the planet is habitable. They send down a probe to further investigate the planet, which Pancha chooses to call Blue-Two. Squirt, the cat, goes missing. When the probe stops responding to Star Runner, Tycho and Cinnamon fear the worst. Meanwhile, Zandie and Degenhardt believe that Cyriax is the ONLY person controlling the ship, and no one else gets a say.
9	9	"Hot Seat"	Unknown	Unknown	2 July 2004
Mara is given the chance to be in an interview that will be broadcast all over Earth, and she is worried that she might muck up the interview, and humiliate herself in front everyone on Earth. Tane is angry because Mara gets chosen to be in the interview, and not himself. Meanwhile, Leonella is continually frustrated with her mother as she believes she is meddling in her and Tane's relationship, but she's offered help by the most unlikely person. Uncredited: Don Halbert as Interviewer.
10	10	"Splitski"	Unknown	Unknown	2 July 2004
Zandie and Degenhardt are annoyed that they're always told what to do and when to do it, while Leonella and Tane become too close, and Lillian tells them to break it off. Frustrated with the rest of the crew and with Cyriax's rules, Degenhardt, Zandie and Leonella lock themselves in the dorm until everyone has equal rights. Pancha and Sheng begin to work together more often and is startled when the computer tells them they are a perfect match! But is the computer right?
11	11	"Can Opener"	Unknown	Unknown	5 July 2004
Everyone discovers that Zandie is a "Hard Target", a person that is frozen in suspended animation for their fighting skills and rogue nature if there are any hostiles on the Silver Sun. The crew try and fail to convince Degenhardt, Zandie and Leonella to come out of the room, but they discover a bigger problem: Star Runner is being pulled in by a wormhole that could take them to any time or place. They discover Leonella has some useful knowledge on wormholes, and Tycho and Cinnamon convince Degenhardt and Leonella to come out. The ship makes it safely through the wormhole.
12	12	"Where's My Star?"	Unknown	Unknown	5 July 2004
Stuck in an unknown place and time, Star Runner has lost all contact with Earth and now has only basic computer functions. Degenhardt, Zandie and Leonella are put on probation because of their protest, while Mara, Sheng and Cinnamon try to find the wormhole. Cinnamon finds a planet with an orbiting asteroid, and Pancha, Mara, Leonella and Sheng discover they can use the energy force from the asteroid's orbit of the planet to reopen the wormhole and return to their own time and place. Afterwards, Cyriax lets Degenhardt, Zandie and Leonella return to their protest: Leonella refuses, as does Degenhardt, and Zandie gets angry. Later on, Tycho seen a mysterious green blob outside the ship.
13	13	"Jelly Belly"	Unknown	Unknown	6 July 2004
The crew believe Tycho is joking about the green blob he spotted, but it appears at the hull of the ship again, and he gets annoyed when no one believes him. Mara is impressed with Degenhardt's ability to work on the ship by himself, and Leonella suspects a little romance arising. Pancha and Sheng discover something is interfering with the ship's scanners, so Cyriax goes on a space walk to investigate. He finds out that a piece of hot metal from a satellite dish caused the problem, and returns to the ship. The episode ends with Cyriax being attacked by the green blob, that somehow made its way into his space suit.
14	14	"Last One Standing"	Unknown	Unknown	6 July 2004
Cyriax begins to feel pain, and an alien vision of himself appears; his mood worsens and he starts to snap at Sheng for no reason. Zandie and Leonella are feuding and Mara tells Leonella to fight Zandie, but Leonella takes it too seriously, and decides to have a martial arts fight that Zandie accepts. A voice begins to talk to Cyriax, who is seen getting stronger at the end of the episode.
15	15	"Two Faced"	Unknown	Unknown	7 July 2004
Zandie feels a bit left out, and Cinnamon, wanting to be Zandie's friend, steals some champagne from Steve and Karen and gives it to Zandie. She decides to drink it, and becomes really sick. Meanwhile, Cyriax begins to get stronger, and Tane and Degenhardt begin to suspect something is up when he goes off at them. When Cyriax and Tane play basketball, Cyriax pushes Tane against the wall and hurts him. Degenhardt tries to show the difference with Cyriax to Mara, but he shows no signs of difference. Cyriax gets stronger, and tries to hurt Degenhardt because he's a threat. Pancha wants to look different, and feels sad about her implant, so she creates a different look of herself, and tricks Sheng into thinking she is Amber Lee, a girl from Earth.
16	16	"Call Waiting"	Unknown	Unknown	7 July 2004
Zandie receives holophone credits to talk to relatives and friends back on Earth, but she has no one to talk to as all of her friends are New Settlers. Mara runs out of her credit ration while talking to her sick gran, so Zandie gives her credits to Mara. Meanwhile, Sheng uses the holophone to talk to the supposed Amber Lee, Pancha's secret alter ego. Pancha reveals this to Sheng shortly after, and they both reveal their feelings toward each other. Also, Cyriax has a feeling something is wrong with the engine of the ship, and orders everyone around angrily. Cyriax eventually orders that the ship be turned around, back to the wormhole. Guest cast: Joan Murray as Eileen Lomax, Tracy Mann as Holophone voice over, Sarah Walker as "Amber Lee".
17	17	"Hole in the Heart"	Unknown	Unknown	8 July 2004
Cyriax orders Mara to spy on everyone, and tell him when someone is doing something wrong; she reports a crew meeting that Degenhardt is calling about Cyriax's behaviour. Meanwhile, Pancha and Sheng are having trouble with their relationship, so Pancha creates a timetable for when she can see Sheng and when she can see the computer. Later, the adult officers are ordered by Cyriax to not attend the crew meeting, where he angrily yells at Mara as a disgrace for trading holophone credits. Mara's gran gets more ill, and she feels lost. She decides to resign from the mission, asking Lillian for help, but as they confront Cyriax, he takes a turn for the worse. Guest cast: Joan Murray as Eileen Lomax.
18	18	"Atmosfear"	Unknown	Unknown	8 July 2004
With Cyriax falling victim to the green blob's virus, the ship is turned around back towards the Silver Sun. Sheng and Leonella find a way to kill the virus, but they can't give it to Cyriax or it will kill him. The crew use the chemical to purge the whole ship of any other traces of the virus, but Squirt goes missing. Tane and Degenhardt, who are monitoring the purge in space suits, find Squirt and seal him in an empty pod to protect him, but they are locked in the room and the chemical is released. Though they make it out alive, Pancha blames herself and breaks up with Sheng because he's a distraction.
19	19	"Begin-Again"	Unknown	Unknown	9 July 2004
Lillian believes that Cyriax should be frozen in suspended animation so that he can be treated by New Settler doctors when they reach the Silver Sun, but they discover that the only way to save Cyriax is to freeze him and send him back to Earth on an escape pod. Two people have to pilot the pod and Steve chooses Tane and Mara, but Mara doesn't want to go back to Earth. Leonella volunteers to take Mara's place, fighting many difficulties along the way. Meanwhile, Sheng feels annoyed when he is not selected to pilot the escape pod, and stops communicating with Pancha for good.
20	20	"One Way Ticket"	Unknown	Unknown	9 July 2004
Degenhardt hears Cyriax say something about BACKUP 397, so he, Pancha and Mara search the computers to find out what it could mean, disobeying Steve's orders. Leonella and Tane are chosen to take Cyriax back to Earth. Cyriax is loaded on to the escape pod, and Tycho asks for Squirt to be sent back to Earth too. Meanwhile, Degenhardt and Mara check the final 397 thing they can think of, and try the cryon pods. They discover pod 397 supposedly has no one inside, but when they open it, they find Cyriax is in there. First appearance of Jeremy Stanford as Cyriax's clone.

=== Season 2 ===
No. overall	No. in series	Title	Directed by	Written by	Original release date
21	1	"Spare Parts"	Unknown	Unknown	20 September 2004
Degenhardt and Mara show Steve and Lillian Cyriax's clone, "C2", and realise they can use it to save Cyriax. Zandie gets angry that they are not going to fully reanimate the undeveloped clone, and tries to stimulate it so that it can wake up. Tane and Leonella are to be rewarded for their courage, as is Lillian, while Degenhardt and Mara get charged for their actions. Meanwhile, Zandie attends to the clone and unexpectedly it responds to her.
22	2	"Speaking Up"	Unknown	Unknown	20 September 2004
Sheng and Mara discover that Zandie simulated C2's brain when the clone begins to dream. It wakes up, and creeps up on Pancha, who takes it to the deck, where Cyriax sees his own clone. Degenhardt and Mara kiss, and she gives him a new look. Just at the moment C2 is about to be resuspended, it speaks out saying that he doesn't want to go. As no one can be placed in suspension against their will, the crew have no choice but to stop.
23	3	"Join the Club"	Unknown	Unknown	21 September 2004
Leonella and Mara organise a ball for themselves, Tane and Degenhardt. Karen teaches the four of them ballroom dancing. Sheng and Tycho have an idea to use Pancha's computer technology to make C2 really smart. After seemingly having his brain fried, C2's intelligence begins to grow rapidly. Degenhardt and Mara try to keep their relationship secret from Zandie, but Zandie sees them kissing.
24	4	"Brain Drain"	Unknown	Unknown	21 September 2004
C2 tries to help everyone on board Star Runner, and hooks the ship up to a fuel barge where it cannot be unhooked. Meanwhile, the young couples have their ball, but it is Zandie who surprises everyone with her excellent dancing talent.
25	5	"Will Power"	Unknown	Unknown	22 September 2004
Help from Earth will take two years to arrive at Star Runner, so Tane has a brilliant idea, but it fails. Tycho, Cinnamon, Zandie and Sheng throw a party for C2, who creates a name for himself – "Will Power". Will decides he wants to go back to Earth and before he leaves he uses Tane's idea yet again to unhook the barge from the ship, which creates a huge explosion. Luckily, everyone gets out safely. The ship heads toward the Andromida Line, a point of no return. If they face any troubles after this line, there's no going back. Final appearance of Jeremy Stanford as Cyriax's clone.
26	6	"Crossing the Line"	Unknown	Unknown	22 September 2004
Everyone is at each other's throats on the ship, so Lillian decides to throw a party for crossing the Andromida Line. Sheng creates highly addictive chocolate, but it makes the crew delirious. Nearly everyone eats the chocolate at the party except for Pancha, Degenhardt, Zandie, Sheng, Tycho and Leonella and when the ship's engines have some problems, the group have to do something because the people that ate the chocolate don't care about what's going on. The only cure – super-strong lemon juice.
27	7	"Dark Matters"	Unknown	Unknown	23 September 2004
The ship enters a region of space filled with dark matter and when Zandie, Degenhardt and Tycho tell a scary story to Cinnamon, she gets scared half way through the night, and runs away into the ship. Tane tells Leonella about Lillian and Cyriax having a relationship, but she doesn't believe him, until she sees it for herself. Leonella goes off at Lillian, but Lillian and Cyriax tell Leonella and Tane that they are not having a relationship. The next day, Cinnamon has gone missing, and she's been missing since the night before. Mara finds her in the lift, but now, no one can see, feel or hear them. Pancha does a scan on the computer, and there's no trace of the two girls.
28	8	"Between Floors"	Unknown	Unknown	23 September 2004
Sheng and Pancha discover that the dark matter's interference with the lift made Mara and Cinnamon disappear, and with Sheng's new idea, they are returned. Mara hints to Zandie that she saw her talking to Degenhardt about getting together, and tells her that she, and only she is Degenhardt's girlfriend.
29	9	"Take a Walk"	Unknown	Unknown	24 September 2004
Cyriax reveals that two people will get the chance to space walk. Leonella and Tane are chosen, and Mara is angry that she didn't make it, but gets to command the walk. Mara, still upset she didn't get chosen, starts to get in over her head with commanding the walk, by commanding everyone else. While in space, Leonella catches a glowing rock. Meanwhile, Tycho and Cinnamon wash the clothes, but it builds static electricity when someone comes in contact with another.
30	10	"Rock the Boat"	Unknown	Unknown	24 September 2004
Zandie advises Degenhardt to break up with Mara because of their relationship, but he can't do it, and Zandie walks in on Mara and Degenhardt hugging. Asteroids begin appearing out of nowhere, and the ship is only barely missing them, but Mara discovers the glowing rock is interfering with the navigation system. Tycho throws the rock away without telling anyone, and he doesn't know whether it was for better or for worse.
31	11	"Cold Shoulder"	Unknown	Unknown	27 September 2004
Zandie wants to be resuspended because Mara and Degenhardt are still together. But decides against it Degenhardt breaks up with Mara, and chooses Zandie. Sheng and Tane accidentally finish Cyriax's fishing game, and have to restart the game, and start from scratch. There is a star that is about to explode up ahead, and they can't dodge it, because they are too close to it.
32	12	"Boil Over"	Unknown	Unknown	27 September 2004
When the star explodes, everything in the ship begins to get hotter, even the cryon pods, and if they melt and reanimate, the people inside could have mental and physical problems for the rest of their lives. As everyone gets hotter, Zandie leaves her room, and tries to use the elevator, but it has broken down, and she faints inside. Meanwhile, Sheng seems to have developed a crush on Leonella.
33	13	"Under Pressure"	Unknown	Unknown	28 September 2004
It's exam time, and everyone is feeling pressure. Pancha becomes strangely exhausted, as Sheng develops a crush on Leonella. Tycho and Cinnamon have a go at the simulation game, but it gets too real when the module is released from Star Runner with them on it. Everyone sits through the exams except Zandie, and everyone passes except Sheng, who was too caught up with his relationship with Leonella. Pancha faints.
34	14	"Take Your Pulsar"	Unknown	Unknown	28 September 2004
Leonella spots a pulsar, a star that has died thousands of years ago. With her new implant battery, Pancha is still strangely exhausted, and faints again. Sheng discovers that the pulsar is reacting with Pancha's brainwaves, and the only way to save her is to destroy the pulsar, which they do with Zandie's brilliant thinking skills. Pancha comes back to life, and chooses never to use the computer ever again.
35	15	"Musical Chairs"	Unknown	Unknown	29 September 2004
Pancha holds an oboe recital, but no one has the guts to tell her that she's bad at playing. Zandie takes over from Pancha as computer manager, and hears a voice speaking over the radio waves, and when Tane is alone on the bridge when he hears it, he answers the call and knows who it is.
36	16	"Revelations"	Unknown	Unknown	29 September 2004
After being hit by an asteroid at the Sargasso Disc, a primitive star system surrounded by asteroids, the crew discover that the ship has been straying off course for quite some time due to a virus that someone had uploaded to the navigation system. Zandie's missing pid is found with the code for the virus on it and she is arrested to face a court martial, but is found not guilty when Pancha finds her an alibi. Facing the knowledge that any of the crew could have uploaded the virus, Star Runner encounters a distress beacon from within the Sargasso Disc. Venturing into the disc to provide assistance, Star Runner encounters a ship identical to itself. Meanwhile, Sheng and Tycho play with the theory of matter transference, much to the annoyance of everyone else.
37	17	"Ghost Ship"	Unknown	Unknown	30 September 2004
Steve, Tane, Mara and Degenhardt explore the ship, Infinity, which is seemingly abandoned. All of its crew had been put into suspended animation, and the answer to why lies in the corrupted log left by Commander Darius. Degenhardt and Mara discover a crew member is roaming around the ship when they open a pod and no one's inside. Mara find Tane, who had wandered off, and as they leave a room, a dark figure emerges from the shadows. Guest cast: Victoria Eagger as Commodore Sorenson, Adrian Mulraney as Commander John Darius, Michael Harrison as Julian Strega.
38	18	"Enemy Within"	Unknown	Unknown	30 September 2004
The missing crew member, Julian Strega, is found after he falls from an upper level and knocks himself unconscious. He wakes up shortly after on the Star Runner, telling how the Infinity was hit by an asteroid which forced them into a nearby wormhole that wound them up in the Sargasso Disc. However, Leonella suspects that Strega and Tane know each other; she finds a communication log of Tane secretly talking with Strega who was in big trouble on the Infinity. Guest cast: Michael Harrison as Julian Strega, Anthony Mays as Strega stunt double.
39	19	"Dark Past"	Unknown	Unknown	1 October 2004
Tane reveals to Leonella how he and Strega were friends, and how he saved his life. Over on the Infinity, Karen discovers that someone had plotted it on a collision course with the asteroid. Degenhardt and Lillian discover that Commander Darius' pod, and all other crew pods, have been booby-trapped. Sheng develops a program to decrypt Darius' log and, after battling Strega in a computer war to protect the decrypted log, Darius' log is presented to Cyriax, and Leonella confesses Tane and Strega's friendship. Guest cast: Michael Harrison as Julian Strega, Adrian Mulraney as Commander John Darius.
40	20	"Journey Into Fear"	Unknown	Unknown	1 October 2004
Degenhardt attempts to circumvent the booby-trap on the Infinity crew's pods, but a full reanimation of all cryons is triggered: the Star Runner crew have less than an hour and the only one who can stop it is Strega. He agrees to go to the Infinity with Tane to stop the reanimation, but the countdown was a ruse. Strega locks Tane out of the bridge and turns the ship towards the centre of the Sargasso Disc, claiming to be able to fix everything by travelling back in time. Guest cast: Michael Harrison as Julian Strega.

== Reception ==
The show has been shown in Sri Lanka with Sinhalese subtitles by the Sri Lanka Rupavahini Corporation under the name "රිදී හිරු" (ridī hiru), lit. 'Silver Sun'. This included a unique Sinhala-language intro with a Sinhalese theme song.

== See also ==
- List of Australian television series
