= Shout! Shout! (Knock Yourself Out) =

Single by Ernie Maresca

from the album Shout! Shout! (Knock Yourself Out)
- B-side: "Crying Like A Baby Over You"
- Released: 1962
- Genre: Rock and roll, doo-wop
- Length: 2:11
- Label: Seville 45-117
- Songwriters: Ernie Maresca, Thomas F. Bogdany (B-side written by Maresca)
- Producer: Billy Mure

Ernie Maresca singles chronology
"Lonesome Blues" (1960)	"Shout! Shout! (Knock Yourself Out)" (1962)	"Mary Jane" (1962)

"Shout! Shout! (Knock Yourself Out)" is a song written by Ernie Maresca and Thomas F. Bogdany, and originally recorded by Maresca in 1962. The single was released on Edward Kassner's fledgling Seville Records label. It also appeared on Maresca's similarly titled album which was issued the same year.

== History ==
In 1961, Maresca was offered a recording contract with Seville, a small New York based label. His protestations that he was not much of a singer were brushed aside, and he co-wrote "Shout! Shout! (Knock Yourself Out)" while sitting in a Manhattan bar with his friend Tom Bogdany.

Maresca's recording reached number 6 on the Billboard Hot 100 chart in early 1962. Backing vocals on the record were by The Del-Satins, who also sang on many of Dion's records, several of which were written or co-written by Maresca. The song's lyrics referred to one of Maresca's earlier compositions, "Runaround Sue", which was recorded in 1961 by Dion, in the lines, "Hey, play another song like 'Runaround Sue', let's do a dance that we all can do".

== Cover versions ==
The song has been covered by several other popular singers and bands, including Rocky Sharpe and the Replays. Recordings have also been made in French, by Les Chaussettes Noires and Les Forbans, and in Dutch, by Wim Leys. The Australian band Ol' 55 included it on their album, Fiveslivejive (1977).

The Buffalo Bills used a version for a brief period in 1993 as its team fight song, during a dispute with the Polaroid Corporation over the rights to "Shout" by The Isley Brothers, which the team had used for that purpose since 1987. Poor response to the change among fans led the Bills to resolve the dispute and return to their custom version of the Isley Brothers song.

== Chart positions ==
=== Ernie Maresca ===
Chart (1962)	Peak position
US Billboard Hot 100	6
US Billboard R&B	25
New Zealand (lever hit parade)	5
Canada CHUM Chart	1

=== Rocky Sharpe and the Replays ===
Chart (1982)	Peak position
Australia (Kent Music Report)	39
UK Singles Chart	19
