= Take It Greasy =

Studio album by Ol' 55
- Released: May 1976
- Recorded: 1975–1976
- Studio: Trafalgar Studios
- Genre: Pop/Rock
- Label: Mushroom Records
- Producer: Glenn A. Baker, Charles Fisher

Ol' 55 chronology
Take It Greasy (1976)	Fiveslivejive (1977)

Singles from Take It Greasy
- 1. "On the Prowl" / "This Little Girl" Released: May 1976; 2. "Looking for an Echo" / "Doin' Fine" Released: August 1976

Take It Greasy is the debut studio album to be released by Australian 1950s retro band Ol' 55. The album peaked at number 3 on the Australian Kent Music Report and was certified 3× platinum. At the time, 1950s music and culture had gained a newfound interest in Australia amongst a younger generation, largely due to the influence of the very popular TV show Happy Days and earlier investigations into doo-wop by the group Daddy Cool.

== Track listing ==
Side one
No.	Title	Writer(s)	Length
1.	"Summertime Summertime (Intro)"	Tom Jameson, Sid Feller	1:41
2.	"Irridescent Pink Sock Blues"	Glenn Cardier	2:28
3.	"I Wonder Why"	Melvin Anderson, Ricardo Weeks	2:16
4.	"Almost Grown"	Chuck Berry	2:12
5.	"Think It Over"	Buddy Holly, Jerry Allison, Norman Petty	2:01
6.	"Get a Job"	The Silhouettes	2:36
7.	"Doin' Fine"	Jimmy Manzie	2:39
8.	"Only Sixteen"	Sam Cooke	2:19

Side two
No.	Title	Writer(s)	Length
1.	"This Little Girl"	Gerry Goffin, Carole King	3:14
2.	"On the Prowl"	Jimmy Manzie	3:01
3.	"New Girl in School"	Jan Berry, Roger Christian, Bob Norman, Brian Wilson	2:10
4.	"Skateboard Thrills"	Jimmy Manzie	2:34
5.	"Looking for an Echo"	Richard Reicheg	3:25
6.	"Goodnight Sweetheart"	Calvin Carter, James "Pookie" Hudson	2:18
7.	"School Days (Outro)"	Chuck Berry	2:09

== Charts ==
=== Weekly charts ===
Chart (1976/77)	Position
Australian Kent Music Report	3

=== Year-end charts ===
Chart (1976)	Position
Australian Kent Music Report	8

== See also ==
- List of top 25 albums for 1976 in Australia
