= (I Want a) Rockin' Christmas =

Single by Ol' 55
- B-side: "Little Saint Nick"
- Released: November 1976
- Recorded: 1976
- Studio: Trafalgar Studios, Sydney
- Genre: Christmas, Rock
- Length: 4:40
- Label: Mushroom Records
- Songwriters: Jimmy Manzie, Glenn A. Baker
- Producer: Charles Fisher

Ol' 55 singles chronology
"Looking for an Echo" (1976)	"(I Want a) Rockin' Christmas" (1976)	"C'mon Let's Do It" (1977)

"(I Want a) Rockin' Christmas" is a Christmas song written by Jimmy Manzie and Glenn A. Baker and recorded by Australian band Ol' 55. The song was released in November 1976 and peaked at number 7 on the Australian Kent Music Report, becoming the band's second top ten single.

== Track listing ==
7" (K-6587)

- Side A "(I Want a) Rockin' Christmas" - 4:40
- Side B "Little Saint Nick" (Beach Boys cover) - 3:11

== Charts ==
=== Weekly charts ===
Chart (1976/77)	Peak position
Australian (Kent Music Report)	7

=== Year-end charts ===
Chart (1976)	Position
Australia (Kent Music Report)	96
