= The Vault (Ol' 55 album) =

Studio album by Ol' 55
- Released: December 1980
- Recorded: February–September 1980
- Studio: Leo Recorders
- Genre: Blues rock
- Length: 33:57
- Label: Leo Productions, Polygram Records
- Producer: Tony Spencer

Ol' 55 chronology
Greasemarks: Greatest Hits 1976–79 (1980)	The Vault (1980)	Open Top Cars & Girls in Tight T-Shirts (1986)

Singles from The Vault
- 1. "Two Faces Have I" Released: June 1980; 2. "Anywhere the Girls Are" Released: December 1980

The Vault was the fourth studio album to be released by Australian band Ol' 55, released in December 1980, the album peaked at number 41 on the Australian Kent Music Report.

== Track listing ==
Side one
No.	Title	Writer(s)	Length
1.	"Raindrops"		2:35
2.	"Corinna, Corinna"	Mitchell Parish, J. Mayo Williams, Armenter "Bo Carter" Chatmon	2:35
3.	"Anywhere the Girls Are"		2:51
4.	"Keep Your Hands Off My Baby"	Gerry Goffin, Carole King	3:29
5.	"Good Timin'"	Fred Tobias, Clint Ballard, Jr.	2:30
6.	"Who Put the Bomp"	Gerry Goffin, Barry Mann	2:37

Side two
No.	Title	Writer(s)	Length
1.	"Two Faces Have I"	Twyla Herbert, Lou Christie	2:55
2.	"Boom Boom Baby"	Dave Burgess	2:19
3.	"Sorry (I Ran All the Way Home)"	Artie Zwirn	1:52
4.	"The Fool"	Hazelwood, Ford	2:25
5.	"What Do You Wanna Make Those Eyes at Me for?"	McCarthy, Johnson, Monato	2:11
6.	"Vacation"	Hunter, Francis, Weston	2:14
7.	"You've Got What it Takes"	Berry Gordy, Gwen Gordy, Billy Davis	3:24

== Charts ==
Chart (1981)	Position
Australian Kent Music Report	41
