= Stay (While the Night Is Still Young) =

"Stay (While the Night Is Young)"

Single by Ol' 55

from the album Cruisin' for a Bruisin'
- B-side: "Caught in the Curl"
- Released: November 1977
- Recorded: 1977
- Studio: Trafalgar Studios, Sydney
- Genre: Blues Rock, Classic Rock
- Length: 4:06
- Label: Mushroom Records
- Songwriter(s): Jimmy Manzie
- Producer(s): John Sayers, Charles Fisher

Ol' 55 singles chronology
"C'mon Let's Do It" (1977)	"Stay (While the Night Is Young)" (1977)	"(Feels Like a) Summer's Night" (1978)

"Stay (While the Night Is Young)" is a song written by Jimmy Manzie and recorded by Australian band Ol' 55. The song was released in November 1977 as the lead single from the band's third studio album, Cruisin' for a Bruisin' (1978). The song peaked at number 16 on the Australian Kent Music Report.

== Track listing ==
7" (K-6936)

- Side A "Stay (While the Night Is Young)" - 4:06
- Side B "Caught in the Curl" - 2:14

== Charts ==
Chart (1977/78)	Position
Australian Kent Music Report	16
