= Screen Memory (album) =

Studio album by MEO 245
- Released: August 1981
- Recorded: 1981
- Studio: Studios 301, Sydney
- Genre: Synthpop; pop rock; new wave
- Length: 37:00
- Label: Mushroom/Festival
- Producer: Peter Dawkins

MEO 245 chronology
Screen Memory (1981)	Rites of Passage (1982)

Singles from Screen Memory
- 1. "Other Places" Released: July 1981; 2. "Jewels (For Your Love)" Released: October 1981

Screen Memory is the first and only studio album by Australian new wave band MEO 245. The album peaked at No. 69 on the Kent Music Report Albums Chart. It was produced by Peter Dawkins (Air Supply, Dragon, Mi-Sex), with Dave Marett as audio engineer, at Studios 301, Sydney. According to Australian musicologist, Ian McFarlane, "[the] title was taken from A Critical Dictionary of Psychoanalysis and the record itself was full of English-influenced pop rock." The album provided two singles, "Other Places" (July 1981) and "Jewels (For Your Love)" (October). For Screen Memory MEO 245's line-up was Paul Brickhill on keyboards and vocals; Mark Kellett on bass guitar; Campbell Laird on drum kit; and Paul Northam on vocals and guitar.

== Track listing ==
Side A (L 37553)
No.	Title	Writer(s)	Length
1.	"Other Places"	Paul Brickhill, Paul Northam	3:38
2.	"Jewels (For Your Love)"	Brickhill, Northam	3:08
3.	"Burning Bridges"	Campbell Laird, Mark Kellett, Brickhill, Northam	3:30
4.	"Promises"	Brickhill, Northam	2:47
5.	"Closing In"	Laird, Kellett, Brickhill, Northam	3:49

Side B
No.	Title	Writer(s)	Length
1.	"White Lies"	Brickhill, Northam	4:01
2.	"Will He Ever"	Laird, Brickhill, Northam	3:03
3.	"So Far Away"	Laird, Kellett, Brickhill, Northam	3:25
4.	"Generator"	Laird, Brickhill, Northam, Wilson	4:49
5.	"Wrong World"	Laird, Brickhill, Northam, Wilson	3:50

== Credits ==
- Paul Brickhill – keyboards, vocals
- Campbell Laird – drums
- Mark Kellett – bass guitar
- Paul Northam – guitar, vocals

== Charts ==
Chart (1981)	Peak position
Australian Kent Music Report Albums Chart	69
