= MEO 245 =

Australian band

- Also known as: Guided Tour (1978–1979)
- Origin: Hobart, Tasmania, Australia
- Genres: Pop rock; new wave
- Years active: 1978–1983
- Labels: Mushroom/Festival
- Past members: Paul Brickhill; Campbell Laird; Paul Northam; Mick Wilson; Mark Kellett; Anthony Moore

MEO 245 were an Australian new wave band which formed in 1978 in Hobart, Tasmania with Paul Brickhill on keyboards, guitar and vocals; Campbell Laird on drums; Paul Northam on guitar and vocals; and Mick Wilson on bass guitar. Wilson was replaced on bass guitar by Mark Kellett, who in turn was replaced by Anthony Moore. The group issued a sole studio album, Screen Memory (August 1981), which reached the top 100 of the Kent Music Report Albums Chart.

== History ==
MEO 245 were a pop rock band formed as Guided Tour in Tasmania by Paul Brickhill on keyboards, guitar and vocals; Campbell Laird on drums; Paul Northam on guitar and vocals; and Mick Wilson on bass guitar. The group's name, MEO 245, refers to a catalogue number of a German Import extended play released by the Beatles. In February 1979 they relocated to Melbourne where Wilson was replaced on bass guitar by Mark Kellet.

The band signed with Mushroom Records and in October 1980 they issued their debut single, "Lady Love". The singles, "Lady Love" and "Other Places" (July 1981), made the mainstream charts in Australia. The group appeared on ABC TV's pop show, Countdown, performing "Lady Love" and "Jewels" (October 1981).

From May to July 1981 they recorded their first album, Screen Memory (August 1981), with Peter Dawkins (Air Supply, Dragon, Mi-Sex) producing at Studios 301, Sydney. It reached No. 69 on the Kent Music Report Albums Chart. According to Australian musicologist, Ian McFarlane, "[the] title was taken from A Critical Dictionary of Psychoanalysis and the record itself was full of English-influenced pop rock."

During April and May 1982 they recorded a six-track EP, Rites of Passage (September 1982), at Richmond Recorders with co-production by the group and John French (he also worked as its audio engineer). It provided two singles, "Sin City" (also September) and "Summer Girl" (November). It was a marked shift from the new wave pop of Screen Memory with a more guitar-orientated sound coming to the fore.

Ahead of the EP's release Kellet left and was replaced on bass guitar by Anthony Moore. In January of the following year Brickhill left to join Little Heroes and the group disbanded by March with Laird joining Soldier of Fortune and Northam going to Luxury Device.

Screen Memory, Rites of Passage and the non-album single, 'Lady Love", were released on CD as Screen Memory / Rites of Passage, for a compilation album in 1997 by Mushroom Records.

== Discography ==
=== Albums ===
Title	Album details	Peak chart positions
Title	Album details	AUS
Screen Memory	Released: August 1981; Format: LP, cassette; Label: Mushroom Records (L 37553)	69

=== Extended plays ===
Title	EP details
Rites of Passage	Released: September 1982; Label: Mushroom Records (L 20014)

=== Singles ===
Year	Single	Album	Peak chart position
Year	Single	Album	AUS
1980	"Lady Love"	non-album single	43
1981	"Marching Feet"	non-album single	-
1981	"Other Places"	Screen Memory	55
1981	"Jewels (For Your Love)"	Screen Memory	-
1982	"Sin City"	Rites of Passage	-
1982	"Summer Girl"	Rites of Passage	-
