= C'mon Let's Do It =

Single by Ol' 55
- B-side: "Teenager in Love"
- Released: January 1977
- Recorded: 1976
- Studio: Trafalgar Studios, Sydney
- Genre: Pop music
- Length: 2:38
- Label: Mushroom Records
- Songwriter(s): Jimmy Manzie, Glenn A. Baker
- Producer(s): Charles Fisher

Ol' 55 singles chronology
"(I Want a) Rockin' Christmas" (1976)	"C'mon Let's Do It" (1977)	"Stay (While the Night Is Still Young)" (1977)

"C'mon Let's Do It" is a song written by Jimmy Manzie and Glenn A. Baker and recorded by Australian band Ol' 55. The song was released in January 1977 and peaked at number 24 on the Australian Kent Music Report, becoming the band's second top ten single.

== Track listing ==
7" (K-6659)

- Side A "C'mon Let's Do It" - 2:38
- Side B "Teenager In Love" - 2:45

== Charts ==
Chart (1977)	Position
Australian Kent Music Report	24
