= (Feels Like a) Summer's Night =

Single by Ol' 55

from the album Cruisin' for a Bruising
- B-side: "He's Gotta Go"
- Released: March 1978
- Recorded: 1977
- Genre: Blues Rock, Classic Rock
- Length: 3:58
- Label: Mushroom Records
- Songwriter(s): Jimmy Manzie
- Producer(s): Bob Taylor

Ol' 55 singles chronology
"Stay (While the Night Is Still Young)" (1977)	"(Feels Like a) Summer's Night" (1978)	"Time for Rock 'n' Roll" (1978)

"(Feels Like a) Summer's Night" is a song written by Jimmy Manzie and recorded by Australian band Ol' 55. The song was released in March 1978 as the second single from the band's third studio album, Cruisin' for a Bruising (1978). The song peaked at number 50 on the Australian Kent Music Report.

== Track listing ==
7" (K-6936)

- Side A "(Feels Like a) Summer's Night" - 3:58
- Side B "He's Gotta Go" - 2:31

== Charts ==
Chart (1978)	Position
Australian Kent Music Report	50
