= The FJ Holden =

- DVD cover
- Directed by: Michael Thornhill
- Written by: Terry Larsen; Michael Thornhill
- Produced by: Michael Thornhill
- Starring: Peter Couzens; Carl Stever; Eva Dickinson
- Cinematography: David Gribble
- Edited by: Max Lemon
- Music by: Jim Manzie
- Production company: FJ Films
- Distributed by: Umbrella Entertainment
- Release date: 29 April 1977
- Running time: 105 minutes
- Country: Australia
- Language: English
- Budget: $319,695
- Box office: AU$710,000

The FJ Holden is a 1977 Australian film directed by Michael Thornhill. The FJ Holden is a snapshot of the life of young teenage men in Bankstown, New South Wales, Australia in the 1970s and deals with the characters' difficulty in reconciling mateship with respect for a girlfriend.

Debi Enker in Australian Cinema comments: "The FJ Holden presents the suburbs as a cultural and spiritual desert. It is a place where regular bouts with the bottle are the only antidote for lives without hope or direction."

The film initially received a R classification from the Australian Film Board of Review, but after an appeal to the censors it was revised to a M classification for moderate sex scenes and moderate coarse language. However, all states except Victoria and New South Wales exercised their right to override the Commonwealth decision and retained the R classification.

== Plot ==
Kevin (Paul Couzens) and his best mate Bob (Carl Stever) drive around Sydney trying to pick up girls in Kevin's FJ Holden. Kevin meets Anne (Eva Dickinson) at a party and she agrees to let him drive her home because she's keen to check out the back seat of his FJ. Bob joins the ride, and she has sex with both men in the FJ.

A relationship develops between Kevin and Anne, and together they eat out at restaurants, race cars, bathe Anne's little brother and get drunk.

Kev is initially nervous when introducing Anne to his father, but is put at ease when his father looks across the lounge room and says to Kev, "Jesus, you’re doing alright for yourself".

The romance falters, as a result of Kevin letting Bob watch them having sex in her bedroom.

Drunk and upset about not being able to grow a moustache like Bob’s, Kevin tries to talk to Bob, who is incapable of a serious conversation because he's always drunk. Bob is secretly happy that he has his friend back, but neither is capable of saying what he feels.

== Cast ==
- Paul Couzens as Kevin
- Eva Dickinson as Anne
- Carl Stever as Bob
- Gary Waddell as "Deadlegs"
- Graham Rouse as Sergeant
- Karlene Rogerson as Cheryl
- Vicky Arkley as Chris
- Robert Baxter as Senior Constable
- Colin Yarwood as Brian
- Sigrid Thornton as Wendy
- Ray Marshall as Mr. Sullivan
- Maggie Kirkpatrick as Betty Amstead
- Harry Lawrence as Security Guard

== Production ==
The film originated with a series of comic poems from Terry Larsen. The budget was raised from Greater Union and the Australian Film Commission. It was created between June and November 1976 in western Sydney with shooting beginning in late October. Most of the young actors were amateurs.

== Reception ==
The FJ Holden grossed $710,000 at the box office in Australia, which is equivalent to $3,266,000 in 2009 dollars. This was despite the fact the film was rated "R" in several states. It sold to some overseas countries and eventually recovered its cost.

Meg Stewart of Filmnews said "When I saw The F.J Holden I was really surprised and quite knocked out by it" but later comments "One problem in the film is, I think, the absence of almost any plot." Colin Bennett in the Age wrote "Cumulatively the portrait, rough as it is, adds up to quite a telling one. But the appeal of The FJ Holden will be mainly to the group it depicts, and not to the tastes of those who don't want to know the truth of so constricted local lives - who need a sugarcoating of farce or nostalgia." In the Canberra Times Dougal McDonald says "The point is rammed home rather subtly yet forcefully that the absence of any structural conflict in the script accurately reflects the emotional and intellectual poverty of its people." The Sydney Morning Herald's Errol Simper said "The FJ Holden, an unpretentious look at life for the young in western Sydney, is probably an indictment of the physical environment which the last 20 years of development has generated, and is the best home-produced film I have seen since Picnic At Hanging Rock." Jamie Manning of the Tribune opines "The trouble with the film is that it has been made in a meaningless way. It lacks any emotional feeling whatsoever and it fails to provide any insights or analysis as to why many people lead a mundane existence."

Rod Bishop's 1995 capsule review in the Age says "The style is loose, the performances range from the competently natural to the awkwardly awful, but as a slice of Australian suburban life in the '70s, it has intrinsic value." Peter Galvin's reviews it in 1996 in the Sydney Morning Herald and says it "was unfairly maligned at the time by many critics" and "Watching The F.J. Holden today it does seem a bit over wrought, a little too resistant to conventional storytelling techniques of rich characters and deep psychological motivation." Andrew L. Urban of urban cinefile reviewed the DVD release and said "Michael Thornhill injects a great sense of freewheeling fun into the film, with terrific naturalistic performances from his cast adding dynamic pace."

== Home media ==
The FJ Holden was released on DVD with a new print by Umbrella Entertainment in November 2005. The DVD is compatible with all region codes and includes special features such as the theatrical trailers, Australian trailers and audio commentary with Mike Thornhill moderated by Peter Galvin.

== See also ==
- Cinema of Australia
