= The Spaniels =

US musical group

- Origin: Gary, Indiana, U.S.
- Genres: R&B; doo-wop
- Years active: 1952–1966; 1969–1970
- Label: Vee-Jay
- Past members: Thornton James Hudson; Ernest Warren; Willie C. Jackson; Opal Courtney Jr.; Gerald Gregory

The Spaniels were an American R&B and doo-wop group, best known for the hit "Goodnite, Sweetheart, Goodnite".

They have been called the first successful Midwestern R&B group. Some historians of vocal groups consider Pookie Hudson to be the first frontman of a vocal group because the Spaniels pioneered the technique of having the main singer solo at his microphone while the rest of the group shared a second microphone.

== Original members ==
The original members included:

- Thornton James "Pookie" Hudson (June 11, 1934 – January 16, 2007)
- Ernest Warren (December 2, 1933 – May 7, 2012)
- Willie C. Jackson (April 22, 1935 – February 18, 2015)
- Opal Courtney Jr. (November 22, 1936 – September 18, 2008)
- Gerald Gregory (June 10, 1934 – February 12, 1999)

== Career ==
The group debuted in late 1952 at Roosevelt High School in Gary, Indiana as Pookie Hudson & The Hudsonaires. They changed their name to The Spaniels, and in April 1953, became one of the first artists to sign with Vee-Jay Records. The group recorded "Baby It's You", their initial release, on May 5, 1953. Released in July, the song reached No. 10 on Billboard's R&B record chart on September 5, 1953.

In early 1954, "Goodnight Sweetheart, Goodnight" hit No. 24 on Variety's pop chart, and rose to No. 5 on Billboard's R&B chart. The Spaniels played regularly at the Apollo, The Regal, and other large theaters on the Chitlin circuit. Sometimes bass singer Gerald Gregory helped other doo-wop groups.

The line-up changed numerous times over the ensuing years.

The Spaniels were the top-selling vocal group for Vee-Jay. The band broke up when the label went bankrupt in 1966, but in 1969, the group reformed, releasing songs like "Fairy Tales" in 1970. An entire new generation was exposed to the group's music when "Goodnight Sweetheart, Goodnight" was featured prominently in American Graffiti and Three Men and a Baby.

Two Spaniels groups later performed simultaneously: one in Washington, D.C., and the original group still based in Gary. The D.C. based group, with Pookie Hudson and Joe Herndon, appeared on the PBS special Doo Wop 50.

Bass singer Gerald Gregory died in 1999.

Hudson died in Capitol Heights, Maryland, on January 16, 2007, after a lengthy battle with cancer at the age of 72.

Courtney died on September 18, 2008, at the age of 71, after suffering a heart attack.

Ernest Warren died on May 7, 2012, in Gary, at the age of 78.

Willie C. Jackson died of a rare lung disease on February 18, 2015, at the age of 79.
