= Looking for an Echo (song) =

Doo-wop song written by Richard Reicheg

"Looking for an Echo" is a doo-wop song written by Richard Reicheg. There have been several popular versions of the song recorded, including:

- The original version by Kenny Vance, first released as an Atlantic records single in 1975. This version also appeared on Vance's album Vance 32.
- An a cappella version by The Persuasions, on their 1977 album Chirpin' (Elektra LP 7E-1099).

== Ol' 55 version ==
"Looking for an Echo"

Single by Ol' 55

from the album Take It Greasy
- B-side: "Doin' Fine"
- Released: August 1976
- Studio: Trafalgar Studios
- Genre: Blue rock, Classic rock
- Length: 3:16
- Label: Mushroom Records
- Songwriter: Richard Reicheg
- Producer: Charles Fisher

Ol' 55 singles chronology
"On the Prowl" (1976)	"Looking for an Echo" (1976)	"(I Want a) Rockin' Christmas" (1976)

Australian band Ol' 55 released a version of "Looking for an Echo" as the second and final single from their debut studio album Take It Greasy (1976). The song peaked at number 9, becoming the band's first top ten single.

=== Track listing ===
7" (K-6504)

- Side A "Looking for an Echo" - 3:16
- Side B "Doin' Fine" - 2:38

=== Charts ===
==== Weekly charts ====
Chart (1976)	Peak position
Australian Kent Music Report	9

==== Year-end charts ====
Chart (1976)	Peak position
Australia (Kent Music Report)	76
