= Glenn A. Baker =

Australian journalist (1952–2026)

Glenn A. Baker AM
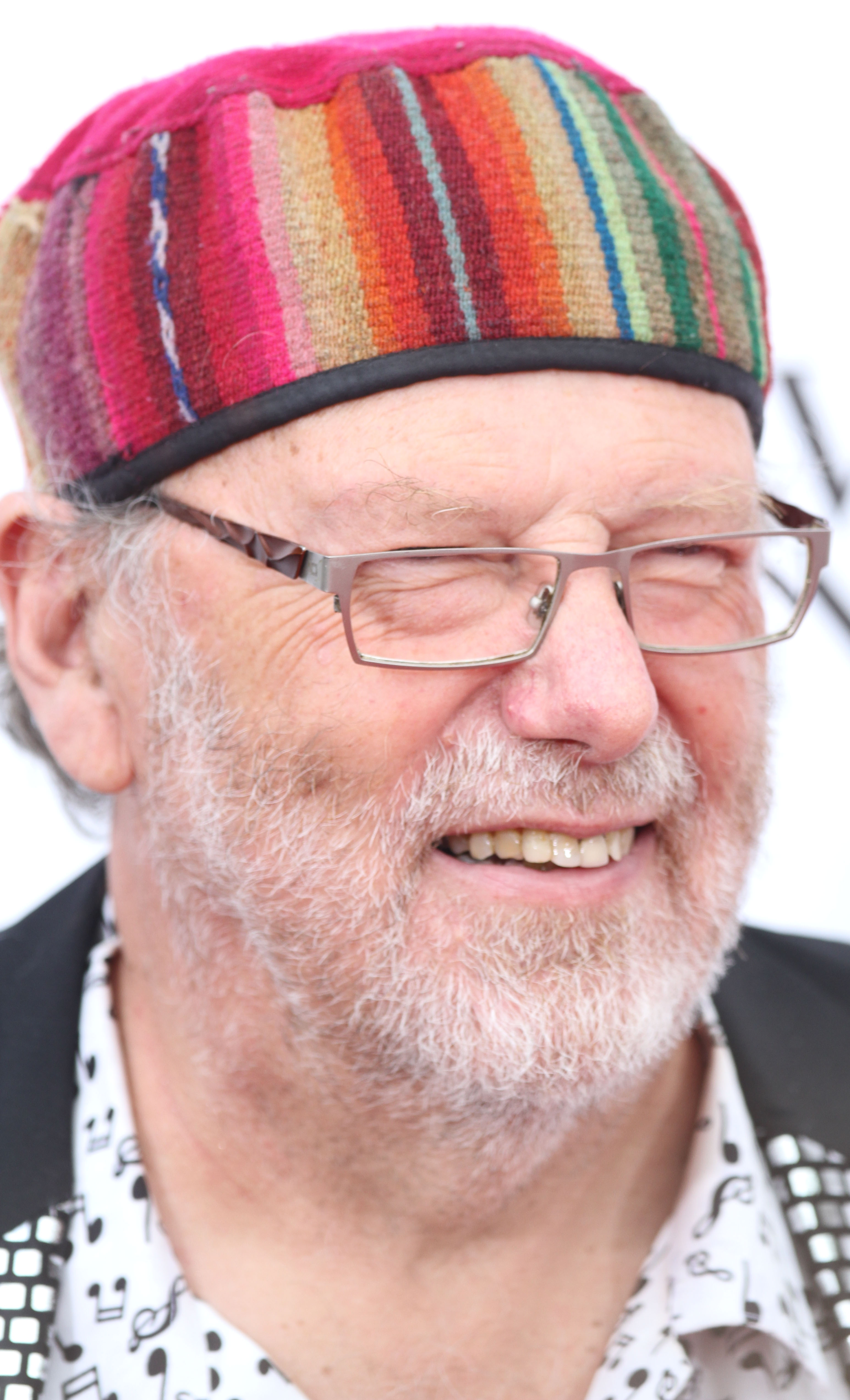
- Baker in 2014
- Born: Glenn Baker; 28 July 1952; Sydney, New South Wales, Australia
- Died: 31 July 2026 (aged 74)
- Occupations: Journalist; editor; author; broadcaster
- Spouse: Lorelle (m. 1973; sep. 2009)
- Children: 6
- Writing career
- Subjects: Rock music, travel
- Notable works: On The Road To Damascus and Other Fabulous Thoroughfares (2001)
- Notable awards: 1995 Australian Travel Writer of the Year; 2000 Australian Travel Writer of the Year; Rock Brain of the Universe title (x3)

Glenn A. Baker (28 July 1952 – 31 July 2026) was an Australian journalist, historian, commentator, author and broadcaster known for his vast knowledge of rock music. He wrote books and magazine articles on rock music and travel as well as album sleeves, interviewed celebrities, managed bands such as Ol' 55 as well as co-founding local record label Raven Records and promoting tours of international stars.

Baker was the Australian editor of Billboard for over 20 years. In the mid-1980s, he took the BBC's "Rock Brain of the Universe" crown three times. He won the inaugural Australian Travel Writer of the Year award in 1995 from the Australian Society of Travel Writers and again won the award in 2000.

== Early life and education ==
Glenn A. Baker was born as Glenn Baker (Note: He added the A. himself as a teenager, in a bid to make his name more memorable: "because the guy who toured the Rolling Stones the first two times and staged the musical Hair was called Harry M. Miller. And I thought, 'You know, people probably wouldn't remember a bloke called Harry Miller, but they do remember Harry M Miller'.") in Sydney on 28 July 1952, the eldest of four children to Joyce Baker. He grew up in Coogee, New South Wales, until he was nine when the Bakers relocated to Canberra. His younger brother, Johnny, drowned at the age of seven the following year at his father's staff Christmas party. His parents separated not long afterwards.

Baker moved around the state, attending 12 schools in 10 years, before leaving school at the age of 15 to help support his family. He remembers wandering around record shops, having no money to spend in them, but excited by the Beatles, the Hollies, and the Easybeats.

== Career ==
While working for the Department of the Media, where he worked on the research project that led to the establishment of radio station 2JJ, and later Triple J, Baker met Geoff Plummer, who was a drummer for Fanis, a 1950s retro band. Baker saw them perform in 1975 and became their manager, changing their name to Ol' 55 after the Tom Waits song. Baker's management was astute and presented the group as a combination of retro kitsch, rock music and clever theatrics. Baker introduced chartered accountant Peter Brian to the band and he became their versatile front man known as Frankie J. Holden; in October, Baker recruited saxophone player Nick Aitken who performed as Wilbur Wilde. Ol' 55 had hit singles with "On the Prowl", "Looking for an Echo" and the number one "(I Want A) Rockin' Christmas" (which Baker co-wrote, as he did "C'mon Let's Do It") and a No. 2 triple platinum debut album, Take It Greasy. Both Holden and Wilde had careers in television after Ol' 55. From 1976 to 1978, Baker also managed Punkz, which he moulded into the pop group Cheek who had national chart success with "So Much in Love".

Baker left public service and was employed by Festival Records, where he wrote sleeve notes. At this time he also began collecting rock music memorabilia, amassing a huge amount over the years. He became a member of APRA AMCOS in 1976.

Raven Records was an Australian label established in 1979 by Baker, Kevin Mueller, and Peter Shillito, specialising in reissues and retrospectives. Raven Music ceased activities in 2017.

Baker's radio career started by hosting a music trivia program on Sydney radio station 2JJ (soon to become Triple J) and moved on to the Triple M network.

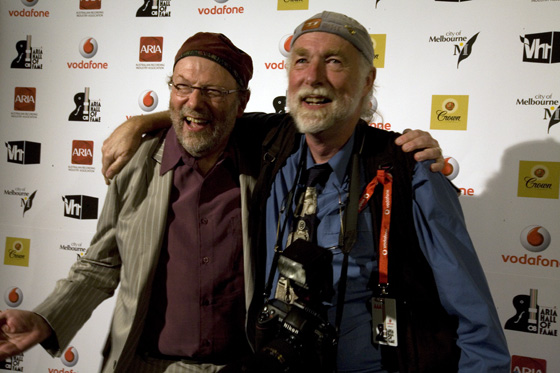
Baker with photographer Bob King at the ARIA Hall of Fame in 2008

Specialising in music and travel writing (the later from around 2009), Baker authored 16 books, wrote for more than 200 magazines and annotated over 500 music albums as well as being a consultant on various music-related projects. He was the Australian editor of Billboard for over 20 years. A longtime friend of rock photographer Bob King, whom he met in 1976, he collaborated with King on several music and travel books, including External combustion: Glenn A. Baker on music (1990). September 2010 saw the simultaneous release of two of his books – Best of Baker: Music and Best of Baker: Travel.

He also co-wrote music for films, and was a television and radio presenter, appearing regularly on The Today Show, Mornings With Kerri-Anne and 20 to 1. He regularly appeared on the Ovation Channel, where he introduced music specials such as those on ABBA, The Beatles, The Rolling Stones, Cliff Richard, The Shadows, Slim Dusty, and Max Merritt, and spoke to Australian pirate DJs. He was heard as an in-flight presenter on Qantas over a period of around 20 years.

Over his career, Baker authored or edited 17 books, and wrote sleeve notes for more than 600 albums, and visited around 150 countries. His music collection comprised around 80,000 records and 30,000 CDs. In 2024, he auctioned off his collection of music memorabilia, which had been stored in a warehouse in Western Sydney.

== Recognition and awards ==
Baker was a member of the Australian Recording Industry Association (ARIA) Hall of Fame advisory committee, In this role he inducted Max Merritt, Australian Crawl, the Masters Apprentices, and Billy Thorpe into the ARIA Hall of Fame. In the mid-1980s, Baker took the BBC's "Rock Brain of the Universe" crown three times. Former Prime Minister of Australia Paul Keating called him "a kind of cultural photographer". Baker won the inaugural Australian Travel Writer of the Year award in 1995 from the Australian Society of Travel Writers, and again won the award in 2000. He was a Life Member of the society. In the 2010 Archibald Prize, a black-and-white painted portrait of Baker by Indian-born Sydney-based artist Nafisa was selected as the Packing Room Prize. He was made a Member of the Order of Australia (AM) in the Queen's Birthday Honours List in June 2018, "For significant service to the entertainment industry through promoting, preserving and documenting popular music culture".

== Personal life ==
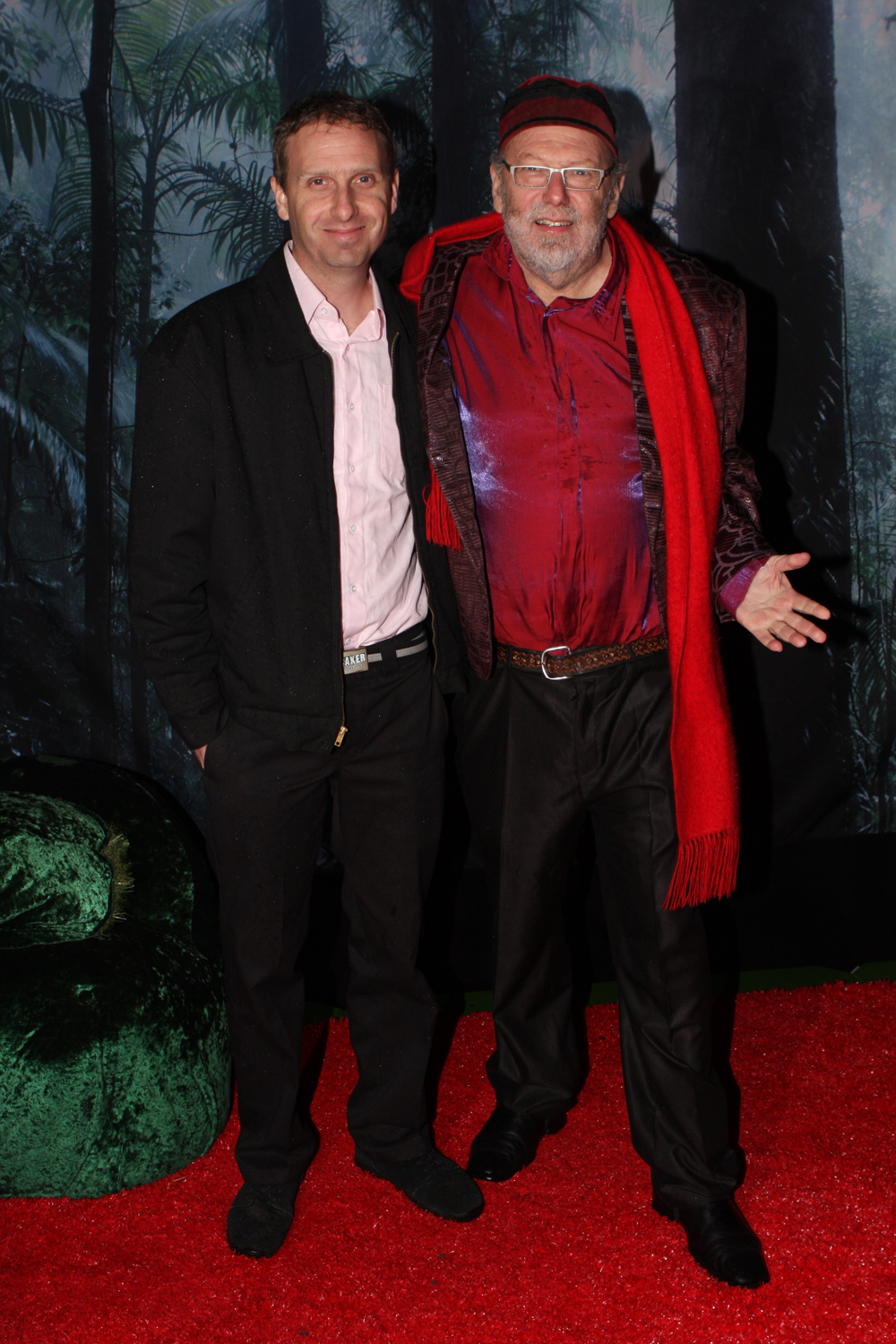
With his son, the actor Rudi Baker, at a Cirque du Soleil premiere in Montreal, Canada, 2012

Baker was married to Lorelle for 36 years, whom he credited with enabling him "to do so many things", before separating in 2009. They had six children. One of their sons is Tristan Baker, who played guitar and laptop in the band Slimey Things, which formed in 2001 and who described their music as "sci-fi pop". The band released several albums, their last one, Goodbye Earth, being released in August 2016. Another son is actor Rudi Baker, who is known for his work in Australian film and television.

== Death and legacy ==
In later life, Baker experienced several health issues including a stroke and a broken hip (which occurred when he was carrying a heavy box of records). Baker died on 31 July 2026, three days after his 74th birthday, following a period of illness.

Jimmy Barnes wrote that he would miss Baker for "his insights, incredible knowledge, and our conversations about music whenever we met", adding that Baker was the first person he would consult whenever he needed to know anything about Australian music history. Canadian music journalist Eric Alper wrote after his death:

Baker's real legacy isn't any single book or broadcast. It's the sheer scale of what he chose to remember and pass along, at a moment when so much of that history could easily have gone undocumented. Anyone working in Australian music journalism today is, in some way, working in a field Baker helped build the archive for.

== Bibliography ==
=== As writer ===
- Baker, Glenn A. (1984). The name game: (their real names revealed). McMahons Point, N.S.W.: Kevin Weldon & Associates. ISBN 0-949708-15-1.
- Baker, Glenn A.; King, Bob (1990). External combustion: Glenn A. Baker on music. Photography by Bob King. Cammeray, N.S.W.: Horwitz Grahame. ISBN 0-7255-2217-8.
- Baker, Glenn A. (1993). Perpetual motion: travels with Glenn A. Baker. St Leonards, N.S.W.: Allen & Unwin. ISBN 978-1-86373-429-5. OCLC 38327839.
- Baker, Glenn A. (1995). Faces, places and barely human races. Milsons Point, N.S.W.: Random House. ISBN 0-09-183107-5.
- Baker, Glenn A. (2000). Somewhere in Sydney: 30 Songs from the Harbour City. Sony Music Entertainment (Australia).
- Baker, Glenn A. (2001). On the road to Damascus and other fabulous thoroughfares. Ringwood, Vic.: Harmondsworth: Viking. ISBN 978-0-670-91221-6. OCLC 49595103.
- Baker, Glenn A. (2001). Rock Australia: the 80s & 90s. Sydney, N.S.W.: Australia Post. ISBN 0-642-47662-4.

=== As co-writer ===
- Baker, Glenn A.; Stuart Coupe (1980). The new music. Sydney, N.S.W.: Bay Books. ISBN 0-85835-493-4.
- Baker, Glenn A.; Stuart Coupe (1983). The new rock 'n' roll. Sydney, N.S.W.: Omnibus. ISBN 0-7119-0173-2.
- Baker, Glenn A.; Roger Dilernia (1983). The Beatles down under: the 1964 Australia & New Zealand tour. Wild & Woolley.
- Coupe, Stuart; Glenn A. Baker (1985). Rock, the year that was '85. Sydney, N.S.W.: Omnibus. ISBN 0-7119-0173-2.
- Baker, Glenn A.; Tom Czarnota; Peter Hogan (1986). Monkeemania: the true story of the Monkees. New York: St. Martin's Press. ISBN 978-0-312-00003-5. OCLC 14586450.

=== As editor ===
- Glenn A. Baker, ed. (1976). The explosive hits '76 songbook. Sydney, N.S.W.: J. Albert & Son. ISBN 0-86913-020-X.
- Glenn A. Baker, ed. (1976). The rocka souvenir song book. Sydney, N.S.W.: J. Albert & Son. ISBN 0-86913-022-6.
- Glenn A. Baker, ed. (1979). Disco inferno. Sydney, N.S.W.: Summit Books. ISBN 0-7271-0404-7.
- King, Bob; Glenn A. Baker (1981). Glenn A. Baker (ed.). Rock lens. North Ryde, N.S.W.: Cassell Australia Australia. ISBN 0-7269-0494-5.
- Robertson, Donald; Glenn A. Baker (1983). Donald Robertson (ed.). Rock'n'roll royalty. Sydney, N.S.W.: Australian Broadcasting Corporation. ISBN 0-642-97511-6.
- Baker, Glenn A.; Bob King (1987). Glenn A. Baker (ed.). Australian made, gonna have a good time tonight: the authorised documentary of the event. Sydney, N.S.W.: Fontana Collins. ISBN 0-00-636921-9.
- Day, David; Tim Parker (1987). Glenn A. Baker (ed.). SA great: It's our music 1956–1986. Glandore, S. Aust.: D. Day and T. Parker. ISBN 1-86252-964-7.
