= Goodnite, Sweetheart, Goodnite =

Single by The Spaniels
- B-side: "You Don't Move Me"
- Released: March 1954
- Recorded: September 23, 1953
- Genre: Doo-wop
- Length: 2:48
- Label: Vee-Jay
- Songwriters: Calvin Carter and James "Pookie" Hudson

The Spaniels singles chronology
"The Bells Ring Out" (1953)	"Goodnite, Sweetheart, Goodnite" (1954)	"Let's Make Up" (1954)

"Goodnite, Sweetheart, Goodnite" is a popular song that was a hit during the mid-1950s. It was written by Calvin Carter and James "Pookie" Hudson in 1951, and was first recorded by The Spaniels in 1953. It has also been released by some artists as "Goodnight, Well It's Time to Go".

== The Spaniels version ==
The song was originally released by the R&B doo-wop group The Spaniels in March 1954. The original version peaked at No. 5 on Billboard's "Rhythm and Blues Records" chart of "Best Sellers in Stores", No. 5 on Billboard's "Rhythm and Blues Records" chart of "Most Played in Juke Boxes", and No. 3 on Cash Box's Rhythm & Blues Top 15.

The Spaniels' version was ranked No. 20 on Billboard's ranking of "1954's Top R&B Records according to Retail Sales" and No. 15 on Billboard's ranking of "1954's Top R&B Records according to Juke Box Plays". It was also ranked No. 16 in Cash Box's ranking of "1954's Top R&B Records as Voted in the Cash Box Poll".

== The McGuire Sisters version ==
The best-selling version of the song was recorded by The McGuire Sisters in 1954. Under the title "Goodnight, Sweetheart, Goodnight", their version reached No. 8 on Billboard's chart of "Best Sellers in Stores", No. 7 on Billboard's chart of "Most Played in Juke Boxes", and No. 9 on Billboard's chart of "Most Played by Jockeys". A million copies of the McGuire Sisters' single were sold.

The McGuire Sisters' version was ranked No. 21 on Billboard's ranking of "1954's Top Popular Records according to Juke Box Plays". It was also ranked No. 33 in Cash Box's ranking of "1954's Top Pop Records as Voted in the Cash Box Poll".

== Johnnie & Jack version ==
It was also recorded in 1954 by country music duo Johnnie & Jack, whose version reached No. 3 on Billboard's "Country & Western Records" chart "Most Played by Jockeys", No. 4 on Billboard's "Country & Western Records" chart "Best Sellers in Stores", No. 4 on Billboard's "Country & Western Records" chart "Most Played in Juke Boxes", No. 4 on Cash Box's chart of "The 10 Top Folk & Western Best Sellers", No. 4 on Cash Box's chart of "The Ten Folk and Western Disk Jockeys Played Most This Week", and No. 4 on Cash Box's chart of "Hillbilly, Folk & Western Juke Box Tunes".

Johnnie & Jack's version was ranked No. 20 on Billboard's ranking of "1954's Top C&W Records according to Retail Sales" and No. 21 on Billboard's ranking of "1954's Top C&W Records according to Juke Box Plays". It was also ranked No. 17 in Cash Box's ranking of "1954's Top Country Records as Voted in the Cash Box Poll".

== Other versions ==
Sunny Gale also released a version in 1954, which reached No. 27 on Billboard's chart of "Best Sellers in Stores".

The song reached No. 8 on the Cash Box Top 50, in a tandem ranking of the McGuire Sisters, Sunny Gale, the Spaniels, Johnnie & Jack, Ella Mae Morse, and Gloria Mann & Carter Rays' versions, with the McGuire Sisters and Sunny Gale's versions marked as bestsellers, while reaching No. 5 on Cash Box's Top Ten Juke Box Tunes chart, and No. 7 on Cash Box's chart of "The Ten Records Disk Jockeys Played Most This Week", in a tandem ranking of the McGuire Sisters and Sunny Gale's versions. The song also reached No. 8 on Billboard's "Honor Roll of Hits", with the McGuire Sisters, the Spaniels, and Sunny Gale's versions listed as best sellers.

== Later use ==
The Spaniels re-recorded the song in 1969 for Buddah Records; however, the title was shown as "Goodnight Sweetheart" and the songwriting misattributed to Ray Noble, Jimmy Campbell, Reg Connelly and Rudy Vallee, implying they covered the unrelated 1930s standard.

The song became well known again in the late 1970s as the closing song performed by Sha Na Na on their weekly variety show, as well as because of its appearance in the 1973 movie American Graffiti.

In 1975, Australian band Ol' 55 released a version as their debut single. The song peaked at number 95 on the Kent Music Report.

The song was sung by Marla Gibbs, Jackee Harry and Alaina Reed Hall in the season 4 episode of 227, titled “A Funny Thing Happened on the Way to the Pageant”.

In the late 1980s it was used again as a lullaby in the major hit film Three Men and a Baby.

For many years, Dick Biondi played the song at the end of every show on Chicago's 94.7 WLS-FM.

The Johnnie & Jack version was used by NTV in Tokyo, Japan from 2000 to 2001 when the broadcasting in a day ended and not having the NNN24.
