= Richard Reicheg =

American singer-songwriter (1937–2021)

- Born: May 26, 1937; U.S.
- Died: July 30, 2021 (aged 84)
- Education: B.A., M.A.
- Alma mater: Brooklyn College
- Occupations: Actor, songwriter
- Spouse: Julie Payne (m. 1971)

Richard Reicheg (May 26, 1937 – July 30, 2021) was an American television, stage, and film actor, musician and a Grammy-nominated songwriter. His career spanned a period of over sixty years.

Reicheg wrote the song “For The Sake Of The Children” that is featured in the Robert Altman film Nashville and for which he received a Grammy nomination in 1975.

His songs have been recorded and performed by many top artists, including The Persuasions, Maria Muldaur, Gary Wright, and Jay and the Americans. His song "Everybody's a Masterpiece" was recorded by Three Dog Night. Reicheg's "Looking for an Echo" was recorded by Kenny Vance, The Persuasions (on their album Chirpin'), and by others. The song was also the musical theme of the Martin Davidson film of the same name. Film historian Jan Stewart has called Reicheg's song "For the Sake of the Children" an "ode to marital fidelity [that is] a delicious postmodern balancing act of send up and the real McCoy."

== Early years ==
Reicheg was born and raised in the Crown Heights section of Brooklyn in the shadow of Ebbets Field. After graduating from Erasmus Hall High School, he served in the U.S. Army, stationed in Germany from 1956 to 1958. Upon discharge, he attended Brooklyn College, received a B.A. and M.A. degree in speech and theater, and acted in college productions. There he learned to play guitar and joined the burgeoning folk music scene in Greenwich Village. In various folk groups and as a solo performer, he toured extensively, playing coffee houses, cabarets and clubs in the U.S. and Canada, including The Bitter End, Gerde's Folk City, The Blue Angel and The Troubadour. He was a featured performer at the 1964 New York World's Fair, and part of The American Hootenany Festival that toured colleges throughout the US. During those years he recorded for Laurie, 20th Century Fox (as Lenny and Dick) and Decca records (as Sunrise Highway).

== Personal life ==
Prior to his death, Reicheg lived in Los Angeles, California with his wife Julie Payne. He died on July 30, 2021, at the age of 84.

== Filmography ==
=== Film ===
Title	Role	Director	Year
Charlie Wilson's War	Navy Buddy	Mike Nichols	
Tripper	News Anchor	David Arquette	
Monkey Trouble	Mr. Big's Henchman	Franco Amurri	
Oh, God! Book II	Karl	Gil Cates	
First Family	Agent Fowler	Buck Henry	
Dirty Business	Albert (Lead)	John McCauley	
Delta Fox	Howard	Ferd Sebastian	
Leprechaun III	Lucky	Brian Trenchard-Smith	
Americathon	Hebrab Terrorist	Neil Israel	

=== Television ===
Title	Credit	Year(s)
Betty White's Off Their Rockers	Series Regular	
Alias	Co-Star	
Days of Our Lives	Recurring	
High Incident	Guest Star	
The West Side Waltz MOW)	Co-Star	
Dream On	Guest Star	
Empty Nest (3)	Guest Star	
Beverly Hills 90210	Guest Star	
The Golden Girls	Guest Star	
Beverly Hills Buntz	Guest Star	
Dallas	Guest Star	
Sledge Hammer!	Guest Star	
What a Country!	Guest Star	
Remington Steele (2)	Guest Star	
The A-Team	Guest Star	
Hardcastle and McCormick	Guest Star	
Faerie Tale Theatre	Guest Star	
Quincy, M.E.	Guest Star	
The White Shadow	Guest Star	
Married to the Mob (pilot)	Recurring	
Brooklyn Bridge	Recurring	
Hill Street Blues	Guest Star	
Long Days of Summer (MOW)	Guest Star	
Superior Court	Guest Star	
General Hospital	Recurring	
The Desperate Miles (MOW)	Lead	
Two Guys from MUCK (pilot)	Recurring	
Monster Manor (pilot)	Recurring	
Police Story (2)	Guest Star	
Newhart	Guest Star	
C.H.I.P.S.	Guest Star	
Rhoda	Guest Star	
The Odd Couple	Guest Star	
Young and the Restless	Recurring	
Kojak (2)	Guest Star	

=== Theater ===
Title	Role	Theater	Year
Twilight of the Golds	Walter	Booth Theater, Broadway (Standby)	
California Suite	Marvin/Mort	Drury Lane, Chicago	
A Bedfull of Foreigners	Karak	Drury Lane, Union Plaza, Las Vegas	
Chapter Two	Leo	Cherry County Playhouse, Michigan	
Murder at the Howard Johnson's	Mitch	Cherry County Playhouse	
A Thousand Clowns	Chuckles	Arlington Park, Chicago	
Barefoot in the Park	Telephone Man	Arlington Park (Joseph Jefferson Award)	
The Odd Couple	Speed/Roy	Major Cities Tour	
Room Service	Binion	Loretto Hilton, St. Louis	
Little Murders	Alfred	Manitoba Theatre Center, Winnipeg	
Gangster Planet	Dad	Met Theater, Los Angeles	
At the Mat	Albert	Figtree Theater, Los Angeles	
Prisoner of Venice	Swede	Zephyr Theatre, Los Angeles	
Sophie and Willa	Leonard	Tiffany Theater, Los Angeles	
