= Jimmy Manzie =

Australian singer & film score composer

James William Manzie, known as Jimmy Manzie or Jim Manzie, is an Australian musician (bass guitar, vocals, lead guitar) and songwriter for a variety of bands including rock revival band Ol' 55 (1975–1979), pop groups The Breakers (1979–1982) and The Fives (1982) before turning to solo work, production and composing for film/television scores and soundtracks. As a member of Ol' 55, Manzie wrote "On the Prowl" their top 20 hit single on the Australian Kent Music Report in late 1975, which was followed by their debut album, Take It Greasy which reached No. 3 on the Kent Music Report Albums Chart in 1976.

Manzie has composed for soundtracks or scores including original music for the films The FJ Holden (1977), From a Whisper to a Scream (1987), Stepfather II (1989), Leatherface: The Texas Chainsaw Massacre III (1990, with Pat Regan), Eddie Presley (1992), Pumpkinhead II: Blood Wings (1994), Night of the Demons 2 (1994) Fear of a Black Hat (1994, with Larry Robinson) and Sleepstalker (1995). Additionally he has composed songs for soundtracks including "The Way of All Flesh" for Tales from the Darkside: The Movie (1990).
