= List of sibling pairs =

This list of sibling pairs includes certain twins, provided they have at least one additional older or younger sibling, with also mentioned their reason of fame. Siblings are arranged alphabetically by last name, from oldest to youngest.

== A ==
- Adwoa and Kesewa Aboah; model/actress and artist/model, respectively
- Ben and Casey Affleck; actor/director/producer/writer and actor, respectively
- Robert and Tom Aikens; chefs, twins
- Jessica and Joshua Alba; actors
- Marv, Steve and Al Albert; sportscasters
- Mabel and Jack Albertson; actors
- Kristen and Eddie Alderson; actors
- Lily and Ruby Aldridge; models
- Muhammad and Rahaman Ali; professional boxers
- Lily and Alfie Allen; singer and actor, respectively
- Phylicia Rashad and Debbie Allen; actress and actress/singer/dancer, respectively
- Duane and Gregg Allman; musicians, forming the Allman Brothers Band
- Cardi B and Hennessy Carolina (surname Almánzar); rapper and influencer/fashion designer, respectively
- Hamit and Halil Altintop; German-Turkish football players, twins
- Don and Jim Ameche; actors
- George and Red Amick; race car drivers
- Dana Andrews and Steve Forrest; actors
- LaVerne, Maxene and Patty Andrews; singers in The Andrews Sisters
- Claude and Nicolas Anelka; French football agent and football player, respectively
- Steve and Devon Aoki; DJ/producer and model/actress, respectively, half-brother and sister (children of Rocky Aoki)
- Kim and Melanie Appleby; singers, forming pop-duo Mel & Kim
- Natalie and Nicole Appleton; singers, members of All Saints
- Moises and Mateo Arias; actors
- Lucie and Desi Arnaz, Jr.; actor/singer and actor/musician, respectively (children of Desi Arnaz and Lucille Ball)
- James Arness and Peter Graves; actors
- Stefan and Alison Arngrim; actors (children of Norma MacMillan and Thor Arngrim)
- Rosanna, Patricia, Alexis and David Arquette; actors
- Ron and Scott Asheton; musicians, members of The Stooges
- Shawn and Aaron Ashmore, actors, identical twins
- Adele and Fred Astaire; actors, singers and dancers
- Sean and Mackenzie Astin; actors (children of Patty Duke and John Astin)
- Dan and Peter Aykroyd; actors and comedians

== B ==
- Wilhelm Friedemann, Carl Philipp Emanuel, Johann Christoph Friedrich and Johann Christian Bach; composers and musicians (sons of Johann Sebastian Bach)
- Francis Edward, Walter and Constance Bache, composer/musician, pianist/conductor and composer/pianist/teacher, respectively
- Randy, Tim and Robbie Bachman; musicians and founders of Bachman-Turner Overdrive
- Michael and Kevin Bacon; composer/musician and actor, respectively
- John and Mary Badham; motion picture-director and actress, respectively
- Chloe and Halle Bailey; singers and actresses
- Dan and Dragoș Balauru; Romanian football players
- Alec, Daniel, William and Stephen Baldwin; actors
- Ashley and Jordan Banjo; dancers
- Carole and John Barrowman; author and actor, respectively
- Lionel, Ethel and John Barrymore; actors
- Justine and Jason Bateman; actors
- Skip and Rick Bayless; sports columnist and chef, respectively
- Shirley MacLaine and Warren Beatty; actors
- Daniel and Natasha Bedingfield; musicians
- Noah Sr. and Wallace Beery; actors
- Robert and Ronald Bell; musicians, members of Kool & The Gang
- Brie and Nikki Bella; professional wrestlers and TV personalities, identical twins, known as The Bella Twins
- Howard and David Bellamy; musicians
- John and James Belushi; actors and comedians
- Sven and Lars Bender; German football players, twins
- Constance and Joan Bennett; actresses
- Jonas, Malin and Jenny Berggren; musicians, founding members of Ace of Base
- Melissa Michaelsen and Peter Billingsley; actors
- Will and Brooke Blair; film music composers
- Gayle and Gillian Blakeney; actors/musicians, identical twins
- Brian, Scott and Mike Bloom; actors and musician, respectively
- Kevin-Prince and Jérôme Boateng; German-Ghanaian football players
- Martin and Bobby Boer; founders of the band 2 Brothers on the 4th Floor
- Frank and Ronald de Boer; football (soccer) player/coach and football player/analytic, respectively, identical twins
- Havard and Hege Bøkko; Norwegian ice speedskaters
- Napoleon and Louis Napoleon Bonaparte; historic French politicians
- Flesh and Layzie Bone; rappers, members of Bone Thugs-n-Harmony
- Edwin and John Wilkes Booth; actors
- Rosalyn and Marilyn Borden; actors, identical twins, also known as The Borden Twins
- Olivia, twins Jonathan and Kevin and Dylan Borlée; Belgian athletes
- Ben and Eric Bostrom; motorcycle racers
- Timothy, Joseph, Sam and Ben Bottoms; actors
- Nadia and Lili Boulanger; composer/pedagogue and composer, respectively
- Larry and Laurent Bourgeois; French dancers and choreographers, known as Les Twins
- Geoff, Gary and David Brabham; Australian race car drivers (sons of Jack Brabham)
- Lorraine and Elizabeth Bracco; actresses
- Joshua, Adam and Zach Braff; author, producer and actor/director, respectively
- Ernesto and Vittorio Brambilla; motorcycle racer/race car driver and Formula One racer, respectively
- Jocelyn and Marlon Brando; actors
- Toni, Traci, Towanda, Trina and Tamar Braxton; singers, also known as The Braxtons
- Nicholas Brendon and Kelly Donovan; actors, identical twins
- Spencer and Abigail Breslin; actors
- Jimmy and Todd Bridges; actors
- Beau and Jeff Bridges; actors (sons of Lloyd Bridges)
- Jay and Mark Briscoe; professional wrestlers (real surname Pugh)
- Sthefany and Kayky Brito; actors
- Charlotte, Emily and Anne Brontë; authors
- Sandra and Gesine Bullock; actress and pastry chef, respectively
- Pavel and Valeri Bure; ice hockey players
- Kurt and Kyle Busch; NASCAR Sprint Cup race drivers
- George, Jeb, Neil, Marvin and Dorothy Bush; U.S. president, Florida governor, businessman and author, respectively (children of George H. W. Bush and Barbara Bush)
- Jenna and Barbara Bush; author/correspondent and author/businesswoman, respectively (fraternal twin daughters of George Bush and Laura Bush)
- Win and Will Butler; singer-songwriter and musician, respectively, members of Arcade Fire

== C ==
- Armando and Fernando Cabral; models
- James and Jeanne Cagney; actors
- Kirk and Candace Cameron; actors
- Frank and Joseph Campanella; actors
- Christian and Neve Campbell; actors
- Claire and Antoinette Cann; pianists, identical twins
- Robert and Cornell Capa; photographers
- Richard and Karen Carpenter; musical duo known as The Carpenters
- David, Christopher, Keith and Robert Carradine; actors and vice president of Walt Disney Engineering, respectively (sons of John Carradine)
- Peter and Kitty Carruthers; figure-skaters
- Nick and Aaron Carter; singers
- Veronica and Angela Cartwright; actresses
- Max and Charlie Carver; actors, twins
- Gerald and Bob Casale; musicians, members of Devo
- Louise and Adriana Caselotti; opera singer and (voice) actress, respectively
- David and half-brothers Shaun, Patrick and Ryan Cassidy; musician/actor, musician/actor/director, actors, respectively (sons of Jack Cassidy, all but David, also sons of Shirley Jones)
- Dean and Dan Caten; fashion-designer duo known as Dsquared2, identical twins
- Pauline and Timothée Chalamet; actors
- Caleb and Brian Chan; TV and film music composers
- Sydney and Charlie Chaplin; actor and actor-filmmaker-composer, respectively
- Logan, Mason, Brock and Max Charles; actors
- Jermall and Jermell Charlo; professional boxers, twins
- Jack and Bobby Charlton; English footballers
- Maksim and Valentin Chmerkovskiy; dancers
- Jimmy and Steve Clark; tapdancers, known as The Clark Brothers
- Tia and Tina Clayton; athletes, twins
- Shannon and Shannade Clermont; models/fashion designers/media personalities, twins
- Joel and Ethan Coen; filmmakers
- Catfish and Bootsy Collins; musicians
- Joan and Jackie Collins; actress and novelist, respectively
- Sean and Neil Connery; actors
- Daisy May and Charlie Cooper; actors
- Roman and Sofia Coppola; filmmakers (children of Francis Ford and Eleanor Coppola)
- Francis Ford Coppola and Talia Shire; film director and actress, respectively
- Tim and Tom Coronel; rally drivers, identical twins
- Rodjun and Rayver Cruz; actors
- Penelope and Monica Cruz; actors
- Macaulay, Kieran and Rory Culkin; actors
- Andrew and Chris Cuomo; politician and news anchor, respectively
- Sondra and twins Cherie and Marie Currie; actress and actresses/musicians, respectively (daughters of Marie Harmon)
- Stephen and Seth Curry; basketball players
- Anne Curtis and Jasmine Curtis-Smith; actors
- Sinéad, Sorcha, Niamh and Catherine Cusack; actors (children of Cyril and Maureen Cusack)
- Ann, Joan and John Cusack; actors
- Brandi, Trace, Miley and Noah Cyrus; singers and musicians

== D ==
- Alexandra and Matthew Daddario; actors
- Tyne and Tim Daly; actors
- Alice and Asia D'Amato; gymnasts, twins
- Brittany and Cynthia Daniel; actresses, twins
- Mychael and Jeff Danna; film music composers
- Ray and Dave Davies; musicians, members of The Kinks
- Tamasin and Daniel Day-Lewis; chef/food critic and actor, respectively
- Bunny, Bobby, Tommy, Randy, Mark, El, James and Chico DeBarge; musicians and singers
- Kim and Kelley Deal; guitarists, twins
- Dizzy and Daffy Dean; baseball players
- Vance and Ellen DeGeneres; actor/comedian and talkshow host/actor/comedian, respectively
- DeVante Swing and Dalvin DeGrate; musicians, members of Jodeci
- Poppy and Cara Delevingne; models and actresses
- Niki and Gabi DeMartino; singers and YouTubers, identical twins
- Natasia and Jamie Demetriou; comedians and actors
- Sunny, Bobby and half-sister Esha Deol; Bollywood actors
- Emily and Zooey Deschanel; actresses (daughters of Caleb Deschanel)
- Chico and Enrique Díaz; actors
- Matthew and Michael Dickman; poets, identical twins
- Matt and Kevin Dillon; actors
- Joe and Dom DiMaggio; baseball players
- Corianna and Brianna Dotson; DJ duo, twins, better known as Coco & Breezy
- Magnus and Candida Doyle; musicians, members of Pulp
- Karin and Olof Dreijer; musicians, members of The Knife
- Mircea and Virgil Dridea; Romanian footballers
- Jannie and Bismarck du Plessis; South Africa international rugby players
- Hilary and Jacqueline du Pré; British flautist/memoirist and cellist, respectively
- Paul and Isabelle Duchesnay; World champion French ice dancers
- Haylie and Hilary Duff; singers and actresses
- Matt and Ross Duffer; television- and filmmaker duo, twins, also known as The Duffer Brothers
- Nora and Kevin Dunn; actors
- Griffin and Dominique Dunne; actors (children of author Dominick Dunne)
- Nate and Eliza Dushku; actors

== E ==
- Buddy and Vilma Ebsen; actors and dancers
- Bob Einstein (AKA Super Dave Osborne) and Albert Brooks; actors/comedians/writers (sons of Parkyakarkus)
- Jesse and Hallie Eisenberg; actors
- Richard and Danny Elfman; filmmaker and film composer/member of Oingo Boingo, respectively
- Michael Elias and Ruth Rogers; screenwriter and chef, respectively
- David, Viktor and Rasmus Elm; Swedish football players
- Ezekiel, Rahm and Ari Emanuel; oncologist/bioethicist, politician and talent agent, respectively
- Nora and Delia Ephron; writer/filmmaker and author/screenwriter, respectively
- Julius J. and Philip G. Epstein; screenwriters, identical twins
- Phil and Tony Esposito; ice hockey players
- Emilio Estevez, Ramon Estevez, Charlie Sheen (born Carlos Estevez) and Renée Estevez; actors and directors (children of Martin Sheen)
- Robin, Kevin and Duane Eubanks; jazz musicians
- Chris and Scott Evans; actors
- Max and Thom Evans; rugby players
- Deborah and Carlos Evelyn; actors
- Don and Phil Everly, singers of the Everly Brothers

== F ==
- Teo and Corrado Fabi; Italian race car drivers
- Fred and Richard Fairbrass; musicians and singers, members of Right Said Fred
- Cynthia and Débora Falabella; actors
- Dakota and Elle Fanning; actresses
- Chris, Kevin and John P. Farley; comedians/actors
- Vera and Taissa Farmiga; actresses
- Peter and Bobby Farrelly; motion picture-directors
- Josh and Zac Farro; musicians, members of Paramore
- Jonathan and Joshua Fatu; professional wrestlers, better known as The Usos, twins
- Mindy and Corey Feldman; singer-actors
- Rihanna and Rorrey Fenty; singer and rapper/entrepreneur; respectively
- Rio and Anton Ferdinand; football players
- Chiara, Francesca and Valentina Ferragni; Italian influencers
- Ralph and Joseph Fiennes; actors
- Tim and Neil Finn; musicians, members of Split Enz and Crowded House
- Wilson and Emerson Fittipaldi; racing driver/Formula One team owner and Formula One champion, respectively
- Pietro and Enzo Fittipaldi; race car drivers (grandsons of Emerson Fittipaldi)
- Max and Dave Fleischer; animators
- Giovanna Fletcher and Mario Falcone; author and television personality, respectively
- Andy and Grant Flower; Zimbabwe cricketers
- Tom and John Fogerty; guitarist and singer of the band Creedance Clearwater Revival
- Jane and Peter Fonda; actors (children of actor Henry Fonda)
- Ben and Jon Foster; actor and musician/actor, respectively
- Buddy and Jodie Foster; actors
- Edward and James Fox; actors
- Emilia and Freddie Fox; actors (children of Edward Fox, niece and nephew of James Fox)
- Laurence and Jack Fox; actors (sons of James Fox, nephews of Edward Fox)
- James, Tom and Dave Franco; actors
- Lucian and Clement Freud; artist and politician/chef/broadcaster, respectively
- Meeno Peluce and Soleil Moon Frye, actors, half-brother and -sister
- István and Lóránd Fülöp; Romanian footballers of Hungarian ethnicity
- Tyson and Tommy Fury; boxers

== G ==
- Magda, Zsa-Zsa and Eva Gabor; actresses and socialites
- Bruno and Thiago Gagliasso, actors
- Charlotte Gainsbourg and half-sister Lou Doillon; actress/singer and model, respectively
- Noel and Liam Gallagher; musicians, members of Oasis
- Rosana and Isabela Garcia; actors
- Leif Garrett and Dawn Lyn; actors
- Peaches and Pixie Geldof; columnist/television personality/model and model/singer, respectively (daughters of Bob Geldof)
- Presley and Kaia Gerber; models (children of Cindy Crawford and Rande Gerber)
- Ira and George Gershwin; lyricist and composer, respectively
- Isabella and Olivia Jade Giannulli; actress and influencer, respectively (daughters of Lori Loughlin and Massimo Giannulli)
- Barry, twins Robin and Maurice and Andy Gibb; musicians and founding members of the Bee Gees
- Melissa, Jonathan and Sara Gilbert; actors
- Tony and Dan Gilroy; motion picture-directors
- Lillian and Dorothy Gish; actors
- Parry and Lloyd Glasspool; actor and tennis player, respectively
- James and Peter Gleick; science journalist and scientist, respectively
- Rosane and Betty Gofman; actors
- Tracey and Missy Gold; actors
- Cuba and Omar Gooding; actors (sons of Cuba Gooding Sr.)
- Teresa Giudice and Joe Gorga; media personalities
- Boon and Phil Gould; musicians, members of the band Level 42
- Ilene and Todd Graff; actors
- Heather and Aimee Graham; actresses
- Tony and Cammi Granato; ice hockey players
- Frankie and Ariana Grande; actors and singers
- John and Hank Green; novelists and YouTubers
- Colin and Jonny Greenwood; musicians, members of Radiohead
- Melanie and Tracy Griffith; actresses (daughters of Tippi Hedren)
- John and Edward Grimes; musicians of pop-duo Jedward, identical twins
- Ray and Roy Grimes; baseball players, twins
- Jacob and Wilhelm Grimm; fairytale authors
- Michael and Mary Gross; actors
- Greg and Bryant Gumbel; television broadcasters
- James, Brian, Matt and Sean Gunn; directors, writer/actor and actor, respectively
- Yuli and Lourdes Gurriel Jr.; baseball players
- Demna and Guram Gvasalia; fashion designers
- Maggie and Jake Gyllenhaal; actors (children of Stephen Gyllenhaal)

== H ==
- Gigi, Bella and Anwar Hadid; models (children of Yolanda Hadid and Mohamed Hadid)
- Cedric "K-Ci" and Joel "Jo-Jo" Hailey; musicians, members of K-Ci & JoJo and Jodeci
- Este, Danielle and Alana Haim; singers and musicians
- Aaron and Damion Hall; singers, members of Guy
- Wakanohana Kanji I and Takanohana Kenshi; sumo wrestlers (real surname Hanada)
- Wakanohana Masaru and Takanohana Koji; sumo wrestlers (real surname Hanada) (sons of Takanohana I)
- Larry, Tom and Jim Hanks; entomologist and actors, respectively;
- Isaac, Taylor and Zac Hanson; singers/musicians
- Khadijah and Malika Haqq; actresses, identical twins
- Matt and Jeff Hardy; professional wrestlers, also known as The Hardy Boyz
- Steve and Wood Harris; actors
- Bret and Owen Hart; professional wrestlers
- Melissa Joan and Emily Hart; actresses
- Michael, Anne and Thomas Hathaway; writer and actors, respectively
- James Haven and Angelina Jolie; actors (children of Jon Voight)
- Olivia de Havilland and Joan Fontaine; actresses
- Gypsy Rose Lee and June Havoc; dancers and burlesque entertainers
- Edwin and Walter Hawkins; gospel singers
- Franz Joseph and Michael Haydn; composers
- Salma and Sami Hayek; actress and artist, respectively
- Eden, Thorgan and Kylian Hazard; Belgian football (soccer) players
- Murray and Anthony Head; actors and singers
- Lutz and Heinz Heck; German zoologists/biologists
- Margaux and Mariel Hemingway; models and actresses (granddaughters of Ernest Hemingway)
- Jasmine and Melissa Hemsley; food writers
- Luke, Chris and Liam Hemsworth; actors
- William and Caroline Herschel; musicians and astronomers
- Greg and Tim Hildebrandt; artists, twins, better known as Brothers Hildebrandt
- Jonah Hill and Beanie Feldstein; actors
- Jim and David Hill; American football players and sportscaster, respectively
- Taylor, Chase and Mackinley Hill; models
- Paris and Nicky Hilton; socialites
- Maude and Georgia Hirst; actresses
- Christopher and Peter Hitchens; authors and journalists
- Edwin and Aldis Hodge; actors
- Dean and David Holdsworth; football players, twins
- Tom, twins Sam and Harry and Paddy Holland; actors
- Derek and Julianne Hough; dancer/choreographer and actress/dancer
- Shane and Chris Houghton; animators, better known for creating animated series Big City Greens
- Ron and Clint Howard; actor/director and actor, respectively (sons of Jean and Rance Howard)
- Season and Whip Hubley; actors
- Oliver and Kate Hudson and half-brother Wyatt Russell; actors and actor/ice hockey player, respectively (children of Goldie Hawn)
- Slash and Ash Hudson; guitarist and streetwear fashion pioneer (sons of Ola Hudson)
- Lane and Booker Huffman; professional wrestlers, see also Harlem Heat
- Sarah and Emily Hughes; figure skaters
- Rosie, Toby and Florence Huntington-Whiteley; models
- Anjelica and Danny Huston; actress/director/producer and actor/writer/director, respectively (children of John Huston)
- Julian and Aldous Huxley; evolutionary biologist and novelist/philosopher, respectively
- Ronny and Kim Huybrechts; Belgian darts players
- Daniele and Diego Hypólito; Olympic gymnasts

== I ==
- Natalie and Laura Imbruglia; singers
- James and Phillip Ingram; singers and musicians
- O'Kelly, Rudolph, Ronald, Ernie and Marvin Isley; musicians and members of The Isley Brothers

== J ==
- Rebbie, Jackie, Tito, Jermaine, La Toya, Marlon, Michael, Randy and Janet Jackson; singers and dancers, some are members of The Jackson 5
- Jade, Lizzy and Georgia May Jagger; designers and models (daughters of Mick Jagger)
- Frank and Jesse James; outlaws
- William and Henry James; authors
- Brandon and Brody Jenner; singer-songwriter and actor/model, respectively. Half-brothers of the below pair
- Kendall and Kylie Jenner; model/socialite/media personality and socialite/media personality/businesswoman, respectively. Half-sisters of the Kardashians and above mentioned pair.
- Steve Jobs and Mona Simpson; co-founder of Apple Computer and novelist, respectively
- Scarlett and Hunter Johansson; actors, twins
- Jesse and Dakota Johnson; actors
- James and Ben Johnston; musicians in rock band Biffy Clyro, identical twins
- Kevin, Joe, Nick and Frankie Jonas; musicians and actors
- Grace and Noel Jones; singer and bishop/minister, respectively
- Kidada and Rashida Jones; actress/designer and actress/writer/producer, respectively (daughters of Quincy Jones and Peggy Lipton)
- Simon Huw and Justin Jones; musicians of the band And Also The Trees
- Shelcy and Christy Joseph; fashion editors and event hosts
- Al Joyner and Jackie Joyner-Kersee; Olympic athletes
- Wynonna and Ashley Judd; singer and actress, respectively (daughters of Naomi Judd)
- Jessica and Krystal Jung; singers

== K ==
- Bonaventure and Salomon Kalou; football (soccer) players from Ivory Coast
- Michael and Garson Kanin; stage and film writers/directors
- Karisma and Kareena Kapoor; Bollywood actors
- Kourtney, Kim, Khloe and Rob Kardashian; media personalities and socialites, half-sisters and -brother of the Jenner sisters
- Bill and Tom Kaulitz; musicians of the band Tokio Hotel, twins
- Stacy and James Keach; actors
- Jason and Travis Kelce; American football players
- Daniel, Caroline, Kathy, Paul, John, Patricia, Jimmy, Joey, Barby, Paddy, Maite and Angelo Kelly; singers/musicians, also known as The Kelly Family with their parents
- John, Robert and Ted Kennedy; politicians, members of the Kennedy family
- Caroline and John F. Kennedy Jr.; author/diplomat/attorney and socialite/attorney/publisher/journalist, respectively (children of John F. Kennedy and Jacqueline Kennedy Onassis)
- Jack Narz and Tom Kennedy; game show hosts
- Jamie and Patsy Kensit; actors
- Fai and twins Simi and Haze Khadra; model/designer/singer-songwriter and DJ-duo/influencers, respectively
- Salman, Arbaaz and Sohail Khan; Bollywood actors
- Nicole and Antonia Kidman; actress and TV personality, respectively
- Regina and Reina King; actresses
- Nathan and Mark King; musicians, members of the band Level 42
- Masashi and Seishi Kishimoto; manga artists, twins
- Vitali and Volodymyr Klitschko; boxer/mayor and boxer, respectively
- Jonathan and Jordan Knight; singers, members of New Kids on the Block
- Mark and David Knopfler; musicians, members of Dire Straits
- Beyoncé and Solange Knowles; singers
- Kumi Koda and Misono; singers
- Erwin and Ronald Koeman; Dutch football (soccer) players and coaches
- Hardeep Singh and Sanjeev Kohli; presenter/comedian/writer and actor/writer, respectively
- Martin and Chris Kratt; television hosts
- Sid and Marty Krofft; television producers
- Li-Da (adopted) and Danny Kruger; filmmaker and politician, respectively
- Jared and Joshua Kushner; businessmen
- Karen and Michelle Kwan; figure skater/choreographer and figure skater/diplomat, respectively
- Walter, Thomas and Raymond Kwok; chairmen of Sun Hung Kai Properties

== L ==
- Katia and Marielle Labèque; pianists
- Terry and Bobby Labonte; NASCAR drivers
- Patrick and Matthew Labyorteaux; actors
- Nick and Drew Lachey; singers, members of 98 Degrees
- James and Stuart Lafferty; actors
- Ann Landers and Abigail van Buren; advice columnists, identical twins
- Michael and Brian Laudrup; football (soccer) players
- Matthew and Mitchell Laurance; actors, identical twins
- Natasha and Jude Law; artist and actor, respectively
- Joey, Matthew and Andrew Lawrence; actors
- Dominic and Nigella Lawson; journalist and chef/presenter, respectively
- Charles and Arthur Leclerc; Formula One driver and race car driver, respectively
- Brandon and Shannon Lee; actors (children of Bruce Lee)
- Spike and Joie Lee; producers and actors
- Donovan Leitch and Ione Skye; actors, children of Donovan
- Roger and Sugar Ray Leonard; professional boxers
- Shannon and Jared Leto; musician and singer/actor, respectively, members of the band Thirty Seconds to Mars
- Gerald and Sean Levert; singers, members of LeVert
- Daniel and Sarah Levy; actors (children of Eugene Levy)
- Damian and Gareth Lewis; actor/producer and writer/director, respectively
- Stan Lee and Larry Lieber; comic artists
- Pia Lindström and Isabella Rossellini; television journalist and actress, respectively, half-sisters (daughters of Ingrid Bergman)
- Lisa and Laura Ling; journalists
- Peyton and Spencer List; actors, twins
- Shaolin Sándor and Shaoang Liu; Hungarian-Chinese shorttrack speedskaters
- Lori, Jason, Robyn and half-sister Blake Lively; actors
- Lindsay and Aliana Lohan; actresses and singers
- Jamie Lomas and Charley Webb; actors
- Demi Lovato and Madison De La Garza; singer/actress and actress/filmmaker, respectively, half-sisters
- Mike and Stan Love; musician and basketball player, respectively,
- Rob and Chad Lowe; actors
- Romelu and Jordan Lukaku; Belgian football players
- Erik and Magnus Lund; rugby union players
- Kristine and Katrine Lunde; Norwegian handball players, identical twins
- Loretta Lynn and Crystal Gayle; singer-songwriters

== M ==
- Motsi and Oti Mabuse; dancers
- Benji and Joel Madden; musicians, members of Good Charlotte, twins
- Michael and Virginia Madsen; actors
- Ron and Paul Magers; television journalists
- Tom and Ray Magliozzi; radio hosts
- Martie Maguire and Emily Strayer; musicians, members of The Chicks
- Phil and Steve Mahre; alpine ski racers, twins
- Costas and Louis Mandylor; actors and martial artists
- Herman and Joseph L. Mankiewicz; screenwriter and writer-director, respectively
- Heinrich and Thomas Mann; novelists
- Cooper, Peyton, and Eli Manning; American football players (sons of Archie Manning)
- Kate and Rooney Mara; actresses
- Vanessa and Laura Marano; actresses
- Sharon, Cedella, Ziggy and Stephen Marley; singers/musicians, and half-brothers Rohan, Julian, Ky-Mani and Damian Marley; entrepreneur/football player, musicians and DJ/musician, respectively (children of Bob Marley)
- Nico and half-sister and half-brother Selah and YG Marley; football player, model/singer and singer-songwriter, respectively (children of Rohan Marley and grandchildren of Bob Marley)
- Athan and Constantine Maroulis; singers and actors
- Marc and Alex Márquez; motorcycle racers
- Branford, Wynton, Delfeayo and Jason Marsalis; jazz trumpeter/composer, saxophonist, trombonist and drummer, respectively; (children of Ellis Marsalis Jr.)
- Garry and Penny Marshall; motion picture actors/directors
- Leonard (Chico), Arthur (Harpo), Julius (Groucho), Milton (Gummo) and Herbert (Zeppo Marx); vaudeville and film comedians, known as The Marx Brothers
- Christopher and Kyle Massey; actors and rappers
- Danny and Christopher Masterson; actors
- Billy and Bobby Mauch; actors, identical twins
- Carl and John Mayer; singers
- Albert and David Maysles; documentary filmmakers
- Floyd, Roger and Jeff Mayweather; professional boxers
- John and James McAtee; English footballers
- Mary and Stella McCartney; photographer and fashion designer, respectively (daughters of Paul McCartney)
- LisaRaye McCoy and Da Brat; actress and rapper, respectively
- Darius and Donovan McCrary; actors and singers
- John and Patrick McEnroe; tennis players
- Danica and Crystal McKellar; actresses
- Philip and Nancy McKeon; actors
- Shane McMahon and Stephanie McMahon-Levesque; Executive Employees for World Wrestling Entertainment
- Jimmy and Kristy McNichol; actors and singers
- Ross and Norris McWhirter; writers, twins
- Jayne and Audrey Meadows; actresses
- Roger and Rick Mears; race car drivers
- Selton and Danton Mello; actors
- Fanny and Felix Mendelssohn; composers
- Tato and Cássio Gabus Mendes; actors
- Lyle and Erik Menendez; criminals
- Seth and Josh Meyers; comedian/TV host and actor/comedian, respectively
- Alyson and Amanda Michalka; singers and actresses
- Catherine and Pippa Middleton; member of the British royal family and author; respectively
- Dirce and Flávio Migliaccio; actors
- Lars and Mads Mikkelsen; actors
- Arthur Miller and Joan Copeland; playwright/essayist and actress, respectively
- Savannah and Sienna Miller; designer and actress, respectively
- Juliet and Hayley Mills; actresses
- Liza Minnelli and Lorna Luft; actresses/singers, half-sisters (daughters of Judy Garland)
- Kylie and Dannii Minogue; singers
- Aleksei and Anton Miranchuk; Russian football players, twins
- Scott, Clint, Bob and Dave Moffatt; musicians
- Bengie, Jose and Yadier Molina; baseball players and coach, respectively
- Berniece Baker Miracle and Norma Jean Baker (Marilyn Monroe); writer and actress/model/singer, respectively, half-sisters (daughters of Gladys Pearl Baker)
- Carlos and Ricardo Montalbán; actors
- Kate and Lottie Moss; models, half-sisters
- Mark and Bob Mothersbaugh; musicians, members of Devo
- Tia, Tamera (twins) and Tahj Mowry; actors
- Ronald and Michel Mulder; Dutch ice speedskaters, identical twins
- Kate and Laura Mulleavy; fashion designers
- Richard and Robert Mulligan; actor and motion picture-director, respectively
- Noah and Ethan Munck; actors
- Jamie and Andy Murray; tennis players
- Sean Murray and Troian Bellisario; stepsiblings, father of Troian is married to mother of Sean
- Brian, Bill and Joel Murray; writer/actor and actors, respectively
- Charlie and Eddie Murphy; actors and comedians

== N ==
- James and David Naughton; actors
- Art, Charles, Aaron and Cyril Neville; musicians and singers
- Gary and twins Phil and Tracey Neville; football player/analytic, football player/manager and netball player/coach, respectively
- Fayard and Harold Nicholas; tap dancers (see also Nicholas Brothers)
- Scott and Rob Niedermayer; ice hockey players
- Jeni and Kyndi Niquette; actresses and lifestyle models, forming the pop/rock duo Jen and Kat
- Christopher and Jonathan Nolan; directors, writers and producers
- Anne, Denise, Maureen, Linda, Bernie and Coleen Nolan; singers
- Brandy Norwood and Ray J; singers
- Jack Noseworthy and Katie Wright; actors

== O ==
- Finneas O'Connell and Billie Eilish; musician/actor and singer, respectively
- Jerry and Charlie O'Connell; actors
- Catherine and Mary Margaret O'Hara; actress and singer-songwriter, respectively
- Tatum, Griffin and Patrick O'Neal; actors and sportscaster, respectively (children of Ryan O'Neal)
- Jamie and Ian Oliver; chef and singer-songwriter, respectively
- Mary-Kate, Ashley (identical twins) and Elizabeth Olsen; actresses/fashion designers and actress, respectively
- Ferhan and Ferzan Önder; pianists, identical twins
- Lisa and Jessica Origliasso; Australian music-duo The Veronicas, twins
- Kelly and Jack Osbourne; media personalities (children of Ozzy Osbourne)
- Haley Joel and Emily Osment; actors
- Alan, Wayne, Merrill, Jay, Donny, Marie and Jimmy Osmond; singers, members of The Osmonds.
- Nash and Chord Overstreet, guitarist and actor/singer, respectively (sons of Paul Overstreet)

== P ==
- Manny and Bobby Pacquiao; professional boxers and politicians
- Jolyon and Will Palmer; race car drivers (sons of Jonathan Palmer)
- Gwyneth and Jake Paltrow; actress and director, respectively (children of Blythe Danner and Bruce Paltrow)
- Danielle and Kay Panabaker; actors
- Hayden and Jansen Panettiere; actors
- James and John Pankow; trombonist and actor, respectively
- Anthony and Candace Parker; basketball players
- Tom Parker Bowles and Laura Lopes; food critic and art curator, respectively (children of Andrew Parker Bowles and Queen Camilla)
- Dolly, Stella and Randy Parton, and Rachel Dennison; country singers
- Pedro and Lux Pascal; actors
- Lizzy and Robert Pattinson; singer-songwriter and actor, respectively
- Logan and Jake Paul; boxers and social media personalities
- Jim and John Paxson; basketball players
- Freda and Scherrie Payne; singers
- Güher and Süher Pekinel; pianists, identical twins
- Irving and Arthur Penn; photographer and stage & film director, respectively
- Michael, Sean and Chris Penn; musician and actors, respectively
- Chuck and Wesley Person; basketball players
- Chris and Pat Petersen; actors
- Vicky and Debbi Peterson; singers/musicians/composers, members of The Bangles
- Michelle and Dedee Pfeiffer; actresses
- James and Oliver Phelps; actors, identical twins
- River, Rain, Joaquin, Liberty and Summer Phoenix; actors
- Mary, Lottie and Jack Pickford; actors
- Nelson Jr., Kelly and half-brother Pedro Piquet; Formula One driver, model/columnist/blogger and race car driver, respectively (children o Nelson Piquet)
- Camila and Rocco Pitanga; actors
- Mathias, Florentin (twins) and Paul Pogba; French football players
- Ruth, Anita, Bonnie and June Pointer; singers, members of The Pointer Sisters
- Jeff, Mike and Steve Porcaro; musicians
- John and Camille Prats; actors
- Spencer and Stephanie Pratt; reality TV personalities
- AJ and Curtis Pritchard; dancers
- Toby Sebastian and Florence Pugh; actors

== Q ==
- Randy and Dennis Quaid; actors
- Rainey and Margaret Qualley; singer/actress and actress, respectively
- Tegan and Sara Quin; singer-songwriter duo Tegan and Sara, twins

== R ==
- Joe and Jerome Ranft; screenwriter and sculptor/voice actor, respectively
- Dick and Jim Rathmann; race car drivers
- Laird Macintosh and Heather Rattray; actors
- Neil and Ronald Reagan; radio station manager and president of the United States, respectively
- Vanessa, Corin and Lynn Redgrave; actors (children of Sir Michael Redgrave)
- Lauren and James Reid; actors
- William and Jim Reid; musicians in The Jesus and Mary Chain
- Fernand, Marcel and Louis Renault; industrialists, founders of Renault
- Simon and Phillip Rhee; martial arts-actors
- Maurice and Henri Richard; ice hockey players
- Kim and Kyle Richards; actors
- Natasha and Joely Richardson; actresses (daughters of Vanessa Redgrave and Tony Richardson)
- Nicole, Miles and Sofia Richie; actress and models, respectively (children of Lionel Richie)
- Eric Roberts, Lisa Roberts Gillan and Julia Roberts; actors
- Chris and Rich Robinson; musicians, members of The Black Crowes
- Chris and Tony Rock; actors & comedians
- Abby, John D. III, Nelson, Laurance, Winthrop and David Rockefeller; philanthropists, governor/U.S. vice-president, financier/philanthropist/conservation ist, governor/philanthropist and banker, respectively (children of John D. Rockefeller Jr.)
- Christophe and Olivier Rochus; Belgian tennis players
- Raini and Rico Rodriguez; actors
- Pedro and Ricardo Rodríguez; Mexican Formula One drivers
- Roxy-James, Rowdy-John, Rusty-Jake and Ridgy-Jorg Rodriguez; darts players
- Mark and twins Charlotte and Samantha Ronson; DJ's/musicians and fashion designer, respectively
- Tracee Ellis and Evan Ross; actors, half-sister and brother (children of Diana Ross)
- Albert and Michel Roux; chefs
- Windham and Taylor Rotunda; professional wrestlers
- Jimmy and David Ruffin; singers
- Anthony and Joseph Russo; filmmakers duo known as Russo brothers

== S ==
- Marat Safin and Dinara Safina; Russian Tatar tennis players
- Katey, Joey and twins Jean and Liz Sagal; actors (children of Boris Sagal)
- Emilio, Javier and Arantxa Sánchez Vicario; Spanish tennis players
- Carlos and Jorge Santana; guitarists and musicians
- Ilya and Irving São Paulo; actors
- Fred, Kala and Ben Savage; actors
- Nadia and Julia Sawalha; actresses (daughters of Nadim Sawalha)
- Ian and Jody Scheckter; South African race car drivers
- Maria and Maximilian Schell; actors (cousins of Catherine Schell)
- Fränk and Andy Schleck; Luxembourg cyclists
- Oscar and Tadeu Schmidt; television presenter and basketball player, respectively
- Liev and Pablo Schreiber; actors, half-brothers
- Michael and Ralf Schumacher; Formula One drivers
- Amy Schumer and Kim Caramele; actress/comedian and producer/cheerleader, respectively
- Jason and Robert Schwartzman; actors and musicians (sons of Talia Shire and grandsons of Carmine Coppola)
- Drew and Jonathan Scott; realtors, twins
- Ridley and Tony Scott; motion picture-directors
- David and Amy Sedaris; author and actress, respectively
- Gráinne and Síle Seoige; television presenters
- Sterling and Shannon Sharpe; American football players
- Christopher, Stephen and Eric Shea; actors
- Douglas, Athole and Norma Shearer; MGM film sound engineer and actresses, respectively
- George, Amy and Emma Sheppard; singers/musicians, members of Sheppard
- Robert B. and Richard M. Sherman; film music composers
- Alex and Maia Shibutani; ice-dance couple
- Elisabeth and Andrew Shue; actors
- Casey and Nina Siemaszko; actors
- Bruno, Rodrigo and Felipe Simas; actors, (Rodrigo and Felipe are step-brothers of Bruno)
- Joanna, Lucy and Carly Simon; soprano, composer and singer-songwriter, respectively
- Vanessa, Angela and Diggy Simmons; socialite/actress, socialite/editor and rapper, respectively (children of Run DMC)
- Jessica and Ashlee Simpson; singers and actresses
- Marc and Lori Singer; actors
- Alexander, Gustaf, Bill and Valter Skarsgård; actors (sons of Stellan Skarsgård)
- Tom and Jeffrey Skilling; meteorologist and CEO, respectively
- Joel and Luke Smallbone; singers
- Jaden and Willow Smith; actor/rapper and singer, respectively (children of Will Smith and Jada Pinkett-Smith)
- Tom and Dick Smothers; musicians and comedians The Smothers Brothers
- Johanna and Klara Söderberg; Swedish singers/musicians
- Sócrates and Raí Souza Vieira de Oliveira; Brazilian football players
- Britney and Jamie Lynn Spears; singers and actresses
- Tori and Randy Spelling; actors (children of Aaron Spelling)
- Leon and Michael Spinks; professional boxers
- Bruce and Pamela Springsteen; rockstar and actress, respectively
- Cole and Dylan Sprouse, actors, identical twins
- Sylvester and Frank Stallone; actors and musician, respectively
- John and Rick Stein; physiologist and chef, respectively
- Rick and Scott Steiner; professional wrestlers, see also The Steiner Brothers
- Griffin and Hailee Steinfeld; NASCAR-racer and singer/actress/model, respectively
- Lennon and Maisy Stella; singers and actresses
- Jimmy and Jackie Stewart; racing driver and Formula One champion, respectively
- Amy and Ben Stiller; actors
- Guy and Dean Stockwell; actors
- Sly, Rose, Freddie and Vet Stone; musicians of Sly & the Family Stone
- Emma and Spencer Stone; actress and stunt double, respectively
- Angus and Julia Stone; folk music duo
- Barbra Streisand and half-sister Roslyn Kind; singer and actress/singer, respectively
- Shiloh and Rider Strong; actors
- George and Geoff Stults; actors
- Harry and Gemma Styles; singer and writer/journalist, respectively
- Naoto and Masao Suenaga; drifting drivers, competes in D1 Grand Prix
- Rose and Ottilie Sutro; American piano duo
- Patrick and Don Swayze; actors
- Taylor and Austin Swift; singer and producer/actor, respectively

== T ==
- Nana and Miho Takagi; Japanese speed skaters
- Norma, Natalie and Constance Talmadge; actors
- Larron, Lahmard and Larenz Tate; producer and actors, respectively
- Gillian and Kim Taylforth; actresses
- Benedict and Femi Taylor (adopted); actors
- Niki and Krissy Taylor; supermodels
- Ryan and Adam Thomas; actors
- Emma and Sophie Thompson; actresses
- Colette and Hannah Thurlow; musicians and founders of rockband 2:54
- Jennifer and Meg Tilly; actors
- Kara and Hannah Tointon; actresses
- Frank and Joe Torre; baseball players
- Joe and Guy Torry; actors and comedians
- Kolo and Yaya Touré; footballers
- Joey and John Travolta; actors
- Joan and Valerie Trimble; piano duo
- Donald Jr., Ivanka and Eric Trump; business(wo)men (children of Donald Trump)
- John and Nicholas Turturro; actors

== U ==
- Rory and Tony Underwood; English rugby players

== V ==
- Dick and Jerry Van Dyke; actors
- Vincent and Theo van Gogh; artist and art dealer, respectively
- Alex and Eddie Van Halen; musicians, members of Van Halen
- Dick, Joyce and half-brother Timothy Van Patten; actors and director, respectively
- James and Vincent Van Patten; actors (sons of actor Dick Van Patten)
- Ronnie, Donnie and Johnny Van Zant; musicians
- Donna de Varona and Joanna Kerns; swimmer and actress, respectively
- Jimmie and Stevie Ray Vaughan; musicians
- Gianni and Donatella Versace; fashion designers
- Gilles and Jacques Villeneuve Sr.; Canadian racing drivers
- Jeremy and Tim Vine; broadcaster and stand-up comedian

== W ==
- Lana and Lilly Wachowski; directors
- Donnie and Mark Wahlberg; singers and actors
- Rusty, Mike and Kenny Wallace; NASCAR drivers
- Kimberley and Amy Walsh; singer and actress, respectively
- Darrell and Michael Waltrip; NASCAR broadcaster and NASCAR Sprint Cup drivers Daytona 500 Champions, respectively
- Suki and Immy Waterhouse; actresses and models
- Emma and Alex Watson; actors
- J. J., Derek and T. J. Watt; American football players
- Gerard and Mikey Way; musicians, founding members of My Chemical Romance
- Keenen Ivory, Damon, Kim, Shawn and Marlon Wayans; actors/writers/comedians
- Harvey and Bob Weinstein; film producers
- Paul and Chris Weitz; motion picture-directors
- John and Charles Wesley; English clerics and hymn writer, respectively
- Tony and Steve West; darts players
- Maurice, Verdine and Fred White; musicians, members of Earth, Wind and Fire
- Kai and Theo Widdrington; dancer and footballer, respectively
- Lee and Lyn Wilde; actors, twins
- Dominique and Gerald Wilkins; basketball players
- Vanessa and Chris Williams; actors
- Tyler, Tyrel and Tylen Williams; actors
- Venus and Serena Williams; tennis players
- Kimberly Williams-Paisley and Ashley Williams; actresses
- Rumer, Scout and Tallulah Willis; actresses and fashion designer/actress, respectively (daughters of Bruce Willis and Demi Moore)
- Andrew, Owen and Luke Wilson; actors
- Ann and Nancy Wilson; singers/musicians, members of Heart
- Brian, Dennis and Carl Wilson; musicians, founding members of The Beach Boys
- Carnie and Wendy Wilson; singers, members of Wilson Phillips (daughters of Brian Wilson)
- Ricky and Cindy Wilson; composers/musicians/singers, members of The B-52's
- BeBe and CeCe Winans; music duo
- Jeff and Michael Wincott; actors
- Manfred, Joachim and Thomas Winkelhock; German racing drivers
- Cameron and Tyler Winklevoss; rowers and entrepreneurs, twins
- Lois and Jaime Winstone; actresses
- Johnny and Edgar Winter; musicians
- Rob and Richard Witschge; Dutch football (soccer) players
- Paul and Ludwig Wittgenstein; concert pianist and philosopher, respectively
- Nat and Alex Wolff; actors and musicians
- Natalie and Lana Wood; actresses
- Wilbur and Orville Wright; inventors
- Shaun and Bradley Wright-Phillips; football (soccer) players

== X ==
- Taulant and Granit Xhaka; Swiss-Albanian football players

== Y ==
- Simon and Adam Yates; professional cyclists, twins
- George, Malcolm and Angus Young; musicians, members of AC/DC
- Megan and Lauren Young; actors and models
- John Savage and Robin, Gail and Jim Youngs; actors
- Nasteha and Nuni Yusuf; media personalities and entrepreneurs

== Z ==
- Lisa and Billy Zane; actors
- Moon, Dweezil, Ahmet and Diva Zappa; musicians and actors (children of Gail and Frank Zappa)
- Madeline, Vanessa and Yvonne Zima; actors
- David and Jerry Zucker; motion picture-writers and directors

== See also ==
- List of coupled siblings
- List of show business families
- List of U.S. political families
