= Ricochet (Teresa Brewer song) =

"Ricochet" (sometimes rendered "Rick-o-Shay" and also as "Ricochet Romance") is a popular song. The credits show it to be written by Larry Coleman, Joe Darion, and Norman Gimbel, without apportioning the work on the lyrics and music, in 1953. In fact, since Coleman and Darion wrote "Changing Partners" the same year, with Darion as lyricist and Coleman as composer, while Gimbel wrote the English lyric for "Sway" the same year, it can be concluded that Coleman wrote the music and Darion and Gimbel the lyrics.

== Versions ==
It was included in a 1954 film, Ricochet Romance.

The best-known version was recorded by Teresa Brewer on July 10, 1953, and released by Coral Records as catalog number 61043, peaking at number 2 on the Billboard chart in 1953. The B-side was "Too Young to Tango". "Ricochet" is one of the songs Teresa Brewer re-recorded in 1962 for her Philips label Greatest Hits album, with a new Nashville arrangement.

In the United Kingdom, the most popular version was by Joan Regan, and other versions were done by Alma Cogan and Billie Anthony.

The recording by Joan Regan With The Squadronaires was released by UK Decca Records as catalog number F 10193, and in Australia as catalogue number Y6543. It reached number 8 on the UK song chart.
The recording by Alma Cogan with Ken Mackintosh and his orchestra was made in London on November 27, 1953. It was released in 1954 by EMI on the His Master's Voice label as catalog numbers B 10615 and 7M 173. The B-side was "The Moon is Blue".

A comical version of the song is sung on the Season 4 (1955) episode of I Love Lucy "Tennessee Bound", by "Teensy" and "Weensy", portrayed by the "Borden Twins" (sisters Marilyn and Rosalyn Borden).

An Icelandic version was made in 1978 by a comedy duo called Halli & Laddi. Halli & Laddi are brothers and comedians in Iceland. This version is called "Tvær úr tungunum", and the lyrics are written about two sisters from the countryside in Iceland, going to the capital city Reykjavik for the first time, looking for good time and trying to find companions of the opposite sex.

Listing of versions

- Die 3 Jacksons Philips Germany 1958
- Betsy Gay Tops USA
- Enoch Light And His Orchestra Waldorf USA
- Joan Regan with The Squadronaires Decca UK 1955
- Snooky Lanson With Sy Oliver And Orchestra Bell Record USA 1954
- Vicki Young Capitol USA 1953
- Vincent Lopez And His Hotel Taft Orchestra Prom USA
- Alma Cogan His Master's Voice UK 1954
- Halli & Laddi 1978
- Björk Guðmundsdóttir & Tríó Guðmundar Ingólfssonar 1990

== See also ==
- Ricochet (Tangerine Dream album), 1975
