= Please Love Me Forever (album) =

Studio album by Bobby Vinton
- Released: December 1967
- Genre: Pop
- Length: 27:03
- Label: Epic
- Producer: Billy Sherrill

Bobby Vinton chronology
Bobby Vinton Sings the Newest Hits (1967)	Please Love Me Forever (1967)	Take Good Care of My Baby (1968)

Singles from Please Love Me Forever
- 1. "Please Love Me Forever" Released: September 1, 1967; 2. "Just as Much as Ever" Released: December 15, 1967

Professional ratings
Review scores
Source	Rating
Allmusic	3/5 stars

Please Love Me Forever is Bobby Vinton's sixteenth studio album, released in 1967. Two singles came from this album: the title track (previously a hit for Cathy Jean and the Roommates) and "Just as Much as Ever".

Cover versions include "Young Love", "It's All in the Game", "P.S. I Love You", "Bouquet of Roses", "Who's Sorry Now" and "After Loving You".

== Bobby Vinton Cover Girl Contest ==
In July 1966, Bobby Vinton's Epic label announced a contest in which the grand prize winner would be featured on his next album (which was this one) as well as an all-expense-paid weekend to New York and dinner date with Vinton at the Copacabana. The contest ran from August 15 to October 5; the grand prize winner was Pamela Hammer of Pittsburgh, Pennsylvania (coincidentally, her suburban Pittsburgh hometown of Mt. Lebanon is just 30 minutes away from Bobby Vinton's hometown of Canonsburg). Her photo and a short essay of her experience were placed at the bottom of the back cover.

== Track listing ==
Side one
No.	Title	Writer(s)	Length
1.	"Please Love Me Forever"	John Malone; Ollie Blanchard	2:35
2.	"Just as Much as Ever"	Charlie Singleton; Larry Coleman	2:20
3.	"Love Me with All Your Heart"	Maurice Vaughn; Mario Rigual; Carlos Rigual	2:00
4.	"Young Love"	Carole Joyner; Ric Cartey	2:02
5.	"It's All in the Game"	Carl Sigman; Charles Dawes	2:15
6.	"P.S. I Love You"	Johnny Mercer; Gordon Jenkins	2:20

Side two
No.	Title	Writer(s)	Length
7.	"It's the Talk of the Town"	Marty Symes; Al J. Neiburg; Jerry Livingston	2:27
8.	"Bouquet of Roses"	Steve Edward Nelson; Bob Hilliard	2:49
9.	"Who's Sorry Now"	Bert Kalmar; Harry Ruby; Ted Snyder	2:23
10.	"After Loving You"	Eddie Miller; Janet Lantz; Bill McElhiney	2:35
11.	"My Song of Love"	Billy Sherrill; Glenn Sutton	2:26
Total length:			27:03

== Personnel ==
- Bobby Vinton – vocals
- Billy Sherrill – producer
- Bill McElhiney – arranger ("It's the Talk of the Town", "After Loving You" and "My Song of Love")

== Charts ==
Album – Billboard (United States)

Year	Chart	Peak Position
1968	Billboard Top LP's	41

Singles – Billboard (United States)

Year	Single	Chart	Peak Position
1967	"Please Love Me Forever"	Billboard Hot 100	6
1968	"Just as Much as Ever"	Billboard Hot 100	24
