= The Borden Twins =

American TV actresses (1932–2003, 2009)

- Born: United States
- Died: United States
- Occupation: Actresses

The Borden Twins (born May 29, 1932), Rosalyn Borden and Marilyn Borden, were American twin sisters who acted together in numerous television programs from the 1950s until the 1980s. They were best remembered as "Teensy" and "Weensy" in an episode of I Love Lucy entitled "Tennessee Bound". They never rose above supporting players, but the duo performed in many venues, including gigs on the nightclub circuit, as well as larger events including the Rose Bowl. The twins also performed at numerous USO shows at home and overseas. The sisters worked with notable performers such as Lucille Ball, Dean Martin, and Jerry Lewis, Andy Williams, Sammy Davis Jr., Jimmy Durante, Bea Arthur, Bob Newhart and The Ritz Brothers.

Rosalyn "Roz" Borden died January 23, 2003, of liver disease in Modesto, California. Marilyn Borden died March 25, 2009, of complications of congestive heart failure and chronic obstructive pulmonary disease, also in Modesto.

== Television ==
- Four Star Revue (Girls in Gondola 1 episode 1952)
- The Colgate Comedy Hour (1952)
- The Spike Jones Show (1954 and 1957)
- The Ed Wynn Show
- The Jimmy Durante Show (1955-1957 regular performers)
- I Love Lucy (episode 112 "Tennessee Bound" January 24, 1955, as Teensy and Weensy)
- Rhoda... Rosalyn (Marilyn's scene was cut).
- CHiPs .... Lottie and Dottie Tidwell (1 episode, 1977)
- Maude .... Monica and Shirley (1 episode, 1978)
- Apple Pie .... Trudy and Judy Laskey (1 episode, 1978)
- The Ropers .... Hetty and Betty (1 episode, 1979)
- Lottery! .... Flora and Dora (1 episode, 1984)
- The Joan Rivers Show.... (1989)
- Out of This World .... Buffalo Breath Twins (1 episode, 1990)
- All-Star Party for Aaron Spelling (1998)
