= Steve Susskind =

American actor (1942–2005)

- Born: Steven Robert Susskind; October 3, 1942; Springfield, Massachusetts, U.S.
- Died: January 21, 2005 (aged 62); Los Angeles, California, U.S.
- Occupation: Actor
- Years active: 1960–2005

Steven Robert Susskind (October 3, 1942 – January 21, 2005) was an American actor who appeared in numerous small parts in sitcoms, such as Friends, Seinfeld, Frasier, Married... with Children, Scrubs, and NewsRadio.

== Career ==
Susskind also performed as an actor and a voice actor in several films, such as Friday the 13th Part III, Star Trek V: The Final Frontier, Monsters, Inc., The Emperor's New Groove and Osmosis Jones; and the video games Terminator 3: Rise of the Machines and Dead to Rights. He was Father Karambetsos in Friends.

He also sang with The Roommates, who had hit records with "Please Love Me Forever" (with Cathy Jean) and "The Glory of Love" in 1961.

== Death ==
Susskind died on January 21, 2005, in an automobile accident in Sunland, California. His body was cremated. He was 62 years old.

== Filmography ==
=== Film ===
Year	Title	Role	Notes
1982	Friday the 13th Part III	Harold Hockett	
1986	House	Frank McGraw	
1989	Sing	Store Owner	
1989	Star Trek V: The Final Frontier	Pitchman	
1990	A Gnome Named Gnorm	C.P.R. Man	
1992	Round Trip to Heaven	Uncle Jerry	
1992	Aladdin	Agrabah Citizens	Voice
1994	The Lion King	Hyenas	Voice
1995	City of Knoxville	Additional voices	
1996	The Hunchback of Notre Dame	Frollo's Soldiers	Voice
1998	Sandman	Early Knapp	
1998	Mulan	Ping Soldier #1	Voice
1998	Scooby-Doo on Zombie Island	Additional voices	Voice
1998	A Bug's Life	Male Ants	Voice
1998	The Prince of Egypt	Rameses' Soldiers	Voice
1999	Tarzan	Gorilla	Voice
1999	The Iron Giant	Restaurant Patron	Voice
2000	Ping!	Thor	Voice
2000	The Emperor's New Groove	Irate Chef	Voice
2001	Osmosis Jones	Scabies	Voice
2001	Monsters, Inc.	Jerry Slugworth	Voice
2004	Dog Gone Love	The Painter	

=== Television ===
Year	Title	Role	Notes
1987–1994	Married... with Children	Barney	6 episodes
1987	DuckTales	Sergeant Squash	Voice, episode: "Duckworth's Revolt"
1993	Batman: The Animated Series	Maxie Zeus	Voice, episode: "Fire from Olympus"
1995–1996	NewsRadio	Milos	3 episodes
1995–1996	The Tick	J.J. Eureka Vatos, Rabbi	Voice, 4 episodes
1995	Wings	Wedding Band Leader	Episode: "Let's Call the Whole Thing Off"
1998	Mr. Show with Bob and David	Pharmacist	Episode: "Life is Precious and God and the Bible"
1998	Godzilla: The Series	Sydney Walker	Episode: "What Dreams May Come"
2001	Friends	The Priest/Father Karembetsos	Episode: "The One with Monica and Chandler's Wedding"

=== Video games ===
Year	Title	Role	Notes
1999	T'ai Fu: Wrath of the Tiger	Dragon Master	
2002	Dead to Rights	Mayor Pinnacle	
2002	Monsters, Inc. Scream Arena	Jerry Slugworth	
2003	Terminator 3: Rise of the Machines	Additional voices	
