= Ralph Levy =

American film director

- Born: December 18, 1920; Scranton, Pennsylvania, USA
- Died: October 15, 2001 (aged 80); Santa Fe, New Mexico, USA
- Spouse: Miranda Speranza Masocco Levy

Ralph Levy (December 18, 1920 – October 15, 2001) was an American producer and film and television director.

== Biography ==
Ralph Levy was born in Scranton, Pennsylvania. He directed episodes of several television shows, including I Love Lucy, Green Acres, The Beverly Hillbillies, Petticoat Junction, Trapper John, M.D., and Hawaii Five-O. He also served as producer and director of The Ed Wynn Show, The George Burns and Gracie Allen Show, and The Jack Benny Program. Levy's film directorial credits include Do Not Disturb, starring Doris Day, and Bedtime Story starring David Niven, Shirley Jones, and Marlon Brando.

Levy directed General Foods 25th Anniversary Show: A Salute to Rodgers and Hammerstein, a television special broadcast on March 28, 1954, simultaneously on all four major U.S. TV networks at the time.

Levy won the 1960 Emmy Award for Outstanding Directorial Achievement in Comedy for The Jack Benny Program.

== Death ==
Levy died in Santa Fe, New Mexico, exactly fifty years to the day after the premiere of I Love Lucy, the pilot episode which he had directed. However, it was not shown to the public until decades later.
