= Christina Nigra =

American actress (born 1975)

- Born: February 27, 1975 (age 51); Agoura Hills, California, U.S.
- Occupation: Actress
- Years active: 1981—1992
- Known for: Out of This World; Cloak & Dagger

Christina Jane Nigra (born February 27, 1975) is an American actress who performed in The Sword and the Sorcerer, Twilight Zone: The Movie, Cloak & Dagger, and Out of This World.

== Filmography ==
- 1981: Goliath Awaits (TV movie) as Beth
- 1981: Trapper John, M.D. (TV series) as Little Girl / Susie
- 1982: The Sword and the Sorcerer as Young Elizabeth
- 1983: Twilight Zone: The Movie (Segment #4) as Little Girl
- 1983: General Hospital (TV series) (episode #1.5342) as Little Girl
- 1984: Cloak & Dagger as Kim Gardener
- 1985: Lots of Luck (TV movie) as Trish Maris
- 1985: Mr. Belvedere (TV series) as Rona
- 1986: The Wizard (TV series) as Carrie
- 1987-1991: Out of This World (TV series) (78 episodes) as Lindsay Selkirk
- 1991: The Trials of Rosie O'Neill (TV series) as Kim's friend
- 1991: Top of the Heap (TV series) as Candi
- 1992: Harry and the Hendersons (TV series) as Danielle
