= Just as Much as Ever =

Song first released in 1959

Single by Bob Beckham

from the album Just as Much as Ever
- A-side: "Your Sweet Love"
- Released: 1959
- Genre: Pop
- Length: 2:31
- Label: Decca
- Songwriters: Charles Singleton & Larry Coleman

Bob Beckham singles chronology
| "Just as Much as Ever" (1959) | "Crazy Arms" (1960) |

"Just as Much as Ever" is a song written by Charles Singleton and Larry Coleman. The song was a hit single for Bob Beckham, Nat King Cole, and Bobby Vinton.

== Bob Beckham version ==
Bob Beckham released a version of "Just as Much as Ever" in 1959 as a single and on his album Just as Much as Ever. Beckham's version spent 21 weeks on the Billboard Hot 100 chart, peaking at No. 32, while reaching No. 41 on the Cash Box Top 100, No. 32 on the Cash Box chart of "The Records Disc Jockeys Played Most", and No. 19 on Canada's CHUM Hit Parade.

== Nat King Cole version ==
In 1960, Nat King Cole released a version of "Just as Much as Ever" as a single in the United Kingdom. Cole's version spent 10 weeks on the UK's Record Retailer chart, reaching No. 18, reaching No. 18 on the UK's New Musical Express chart as well.

== Bobby Vinton version ==
"Just as Much as Ever"

Single by Bobby Vinton

from the album Please Love Me Forever
- B-side: "Another Memory"
- Released: December 15, 1967
- Recorded: March 10, 1966
- Genre: Pop
- Length: 2:20
- Label: Epic
- Songwriters: Charles Singleton & Larry Coleman
- Producer: Billy Sherrill

Bobby Vinton singles chronology
| "Please Love Me Forever" (1967) | "Just as Much as Ever" (1967) | "Take Good Care of My Baby" (1968) |

In 1967, Bobby Vinton released a version of "Just as Much as Ever" as a single and on the album Please Love Me Forever. Vinton's version spent 8 weeks on the Billboard Hot 100 chart, peaking at No. 24, while reaching No. 10 on Billboard's Easy Listening chart, No. 14 on the Cash Box Top 100, No. 13 on Record World's "100 Top Pops", No. 6 on Record World's "Top Non-Rock" chart, No. 3 on Record World's "Juke Box Top 25", and No. 11 on Canada's RPM 100.
