= Bob Beckham =

American country music publisher and singer (1927–2013)

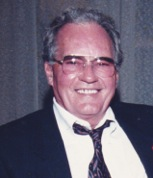
- Beckham c. 1997

Background information
- Born: Robert Joseph Beckham; July 8, 1927; Stratford, Oklahoma, U.S.
- Died: November 11, 2013 (aged 86) Hermitage, Tennessee, U.S.
- Genre: Country
- Occupations: Singer; music publisher
- Years active: 1958–1967
- Labels: Decca, Smash, Monument

Robert Joseph Beckham (July 8, 1927 – November 11, 2013) was an American country music publisher based in Nashville, who mentored generations of songwriters as head of Combine Music Publishing from 1964 to 1989. He played a pivotal role in the career of Kris Kristofferson and guided other artists including Dolly Parton, Larry Gatlin, Tony Joe White and Billy Swan.

As a young man, he had stint of acting in motion pictures in Hollywood and he himself became a recording artist with some fleeting success — but Beckham turned to music publishing in 1961 as his primary career. In the 1970s, Beckham became a major power on Music Row, and nurtured many great songwriters who wrote classic hits like "Me and Bobby McGee" and "Sunday Morning Coming Down" (Kris Kristofferson), and Elvis Presley's "Burning Love" (Dennis Linde). Beckham was a gruff but supportive father figure to his staff songwriters, whom he truly loved. He was given the Mentor Award by the Nashville Songwriters Hall of Fame. The Nashville Entertainment Association presented him with its Master Award in 1988 and he received the Pioneer Award by the Academy of Country Music in 2014. Beckham died in 2013 in a Nashville hospital at age 86.

== Early years ==
Bob Beckham c. 1960

Beckham was born in Stratford, Oklahoma. Beginning at age 8, he got into entertainment as a child actor with a traveling show. He was a Hollywood movie actor for a while (Junior G Men, Starmaker ) but returned to Oklahoma in 1940 to attend school. He served in the U.S. Army as a paratrooper during World War II and then worked as an electrician. He got a job on the radio with Arthur Godfrey before signing a record deal with Decca Records. As a recording artist, three of his records charted in 1959-1960: "Just as Much as Ever" peaked at No. 32 on the Billboard Hot 100 in 1959; "Crazy Arms" peaked at No. 36 in 1960; "Mais Oui" charted at 105. Beckham composed Vic Dana's 1963 chart song "Danger". On tour, Beckham was the opening act for Brenda Lee. When his performing career waned, he settled in Nashville in 1959, where producer Owen Bradley suggested song publishing as a possibility. Beckham's starting job in publishing was in 1961 as the Nashville liaison for Atlanta's Bill Lowery, helping nurture the careers of Ray Stevens, Jerry Reed and Joe South. He then worked for Shelby Singleton Music.

== Career ==
In the early 1960s Fred Foster, owner of both Monument Records and Combine Music, was having success producing singer Roy Orbison on the Monument label. In 1964, Foster asked Beckham to run Combine Music, the publishing arm of the developing juggernaut, which was struggling when Beckham signed on. After two years, Beckham was made president of Combine. According to historian Michael Kosser, "Beckham was one of those rare publishers who truly loved songwriters, and he quickly established his reputation as a gruff but very supportive father figure to his staff writers." When Combine moved to Nashville's Music Row it became a gathering place for songwriters. According to musician Norbert Putnam, "Beckham, we felt, built his company because he had free beer every day at five." Putnam said that every day there would be 18 or so people at Combine, and half of them worked for other publishers. Combine staff writer, Chris Gantry (Note: Chris Gantry wrote the Glen Campbell hit "Dreams of the Everyday Housewife".) said, "He wasn't like a publisher. He was like a dad. He knew how to connect with his writers". Journalist Robert K. Oermann called Beckham "a master raconteur who kept listeners spellbound... The trend developing in those years was to sign singer-songwriters not only for their songs, but also to develop them as performing artists — that way, the publisher had both the singer and the song. An example is Kris Kristofferson, signed to record on Monument records, with his songs published by Combine. Beckham was also shrewd in pioneering deals for song exposure in commercials, placing Combine's copyrights in advertising jingles.

== Dolly Parton ==
In 1964, Dolly Parton moved to Nashville the day after she graduated from high school in East Tennessee. Parton said, "I went down on Music Row to get my contract or an audition. I tried two or three places and they all were filled up with girl singers". She found Fred Foster who signed her on Monument Records. Beckham signed her to a publishing deal at Combine (she had written hundreds of songs). They were unsure of what genre would be best for her voice. "They recorded me as a rock singer", Parton said; " I really came to do country because I always sung country. That's what I was and what I wanted to be". The attempt at rock was unsuccessful; however, two of the songs she had co-written with her uncle, Bill Owens, made the top ten when recorded by Bill Phillips in 1966. (Note: The songs were "Put It Off Until Tomorrow" and "The Company You Keep") Parton was then allowed to try country music and she recorded "Dumb Blonde" which was a hit. In 1967, she released her first full album, "Hello, I'm Dolly " on which Parton had written (or co-written with her uncle) all the songs. It peaked at No.11 on the country albums chart. This album caught the attention of Porter Waggoner and shortly after, Parton gained national attention joining the syndicated weekly "Porter Waggoner Show". With her approval, Beckham began to place some her songs to be recorded by other artists. She said, "he works real hard on our behalf".

== Kris Kristofferson ==
In 1967, a new songwriter named Kris Kristofferson came into Beckham's office and said his previous publishing deal had expired. Beckham heard his material and immediately called Foster. The two had a rule that every candidate had to sing four songs for them (anybody could write one or two..."you can't write four great songs unless you're a writer"). Both Beckham and Foster immediately realized what they had when Kristofferson sang for them. Foster said, "My God, there's never been a writer of this caliber here that's come to my office". Kristofferson was signed to Combine for publishing and to a record contract with Monument, but Kristofferson protested the latter, saying "I can't sing— I sound like a frog". The answer was "you can communicate".

When Kristofferson was a new hire in 1969, he was having a little dry spell in writing and Foster suggested he come up with a song where the hook would be about the name of a woman; a secretary named "Bobbie McKee" who worked in their office. Kristofferson came up with "Me and Bobby McGee" and sang it for her in the office. Kristofferson said, "You know, somebody would give you a title and then bet you couldn't write a song to fit it". The song began to take off, first recorded by Roger Miller in 1969. Kristofferson's own version was released on his first Monument album in 1970 but it did not chart. It was Janis Joplin's posthumously-released version that pushed the song to No. 1. Joplin's version changed the gender of "Bobby McGee" into a male. Other artists took three of the songs on his Kristofferson album to top-ten status: "For the Good Times" (Note: Kristofferson wrote this when he was still in the army and sent it to Marijohn Wilkin who published it at Buckhorn Music. This preceded his signing with Combine.) (Ray Price); "Sunday Mornin' Comin' Down" (Johnny Cash); and "Help Me Make It Through the Night" (Sammi Smith).

== Dennis Linde ==
In 1969, a 26 year old musician and songwriter from St. Louis named Dennis Linde (pronounced LIN-dy) came to Nashville and was hired as staff writer by Beckham. Linde loved the creative environment he found working there. Linde said, "Bob Beckham's building at Combine was a rickety old two-story place, and Kris [Kristofferson] lived in an upstairs room next door. I just had never run into so many talented people". In 1970 Linde had a couple of hits, one by Roy Drusky and another by Roger Miller. Coincidentally, Linde met Beckham's daughter Pam— eventually the two fell in love and were married. The following year Linde wrote a song called "Burning Love". He had just bought a set of drums for his home studio and was learning to play them when the song came to him. He played all the parts himself and made a demo. The first singer to record it was Arthur Alexander on the Warner Brothers label in late 1971, but soon the song reached Elvis Presley who released his own version. This eclipsed Alexander's version quickly— Presley's making the top ten in both the U.S. and Europe and scarcely missed becoming No. 1 in the U.S.(1972). It was Presley's last major hit and the song's worldwide success greatly increased Combine's profitability; for example, the song was featured on the soundtracks of five motion pictures. Linde's stature as a songwriter was also increased, allowing him to do other projects, and make solo albums. Elvis recorded two more of Linde's compositions, "I Got a Feelin' in My Body" and "For the Heart".

== Later years ==
Combine's success peaked in the early 1970s largely due to the Kristofferson and Linde hits so big that they became country standards. In 1986, Combine was sold to Swid, Bandier, and Koppleman (SBK Entertainment). In 1990, Beckham established HoriPro Music, a subsidiary of Taiyo Music, Japan's largest music publisher. He advanced to chairman of "HoriPro Entertainment Group" in 2001, and remained as president until he retired in 2006.

== Discography ==
=== Albums ===
Title	Details
Just as Much as Ever	Release date: 1960; Label: Decca Records

=== Singles ===
Year	Single	Peak chart positions		Album
Year	Single	US Country	US	Album
1958	"Tomorrow"	—	—	Non-album song
1959	"Just as Much as Ever"	—	32	Just as Much as Ever
1959	"Crazy Arms"	—	36	Just as Much as Ever
1960	"Mais Oui"	—	105	Non-album songs
1960	"Nothing Is Forever"	—	—	Non-album songs
1960	"Meet Me Halfway"	—	—	Non-album songs
1961	"Forget It"	—	—	Non-album songs
1961	"How Soon"	—	—	Non-album songs
1961	"Just Friends"	—	—	Non-album songs
1962	"I Cry Like a Baby"	—	—	Non-album songs
1962	"Building Memories"	—	—	Non-album songs
1963	"Footprints"	—	—	Non-album songs
1963	"Grabbing at Rainbows"	—	—	Non-album songs
1964	"Helpless"	—	—	Non-album songs
1965	"Slowly Dying"	—	—	Non-album songs
1967	"Cherokee Strip"	73	—	Non-album songs
1967	"Lily White"	—	—	Non-album songs
"—" denotes releases that did not chart

== Bibliography ==
- Joel Whitburn, The Billboard Book of Top 40 Hits. 7th edn, 2000
