= Bob Claver =

American television director and producer (1928–2017)

- Born: Robert Earl Claver; May 22, 1928; Chicago, Illinois, U.S.
- Died: December 14, 2017 (aged 89); Redding, California, U.S.
- Education: University of Illinois Chicago
- Occupations: Television director, television producer
- Years active: 1959–1991
- Children: 1

Robert Earl Claver (May 22, 1928 – December 14, 2017) was an American television director and producer.

Born in Chicago, Illinois, where he earned his journalism degree at University of Illinois Chicago and served in the United States Army for two years. Claver began his career in 1959, producing an episode of the variety series The Jimmie Rodgers Show. He also made his directional debut in 1963, as directing an episode for the American military comedy television series Ensign O'Toole.

Later in his career, Claver directed and produced for other television series, as his credits includes, Small Wonder, The Partridge Family, Rhoda, The Bob Newhart Show, Mork & Mindy, Here Comes the Brides, The Farmer's Daughter, Welcome Back, Kotter, The New Leave It to Beaver, Charles in Charge, Gloria, The Girl with Something Extra, The Dukes of Hazzard and Captain Kangaroo. He retired his career in 1991, last directing for the television series Out of This World.

Claver died in December 2017 in Redding, California, at the age of 89.
