= Tommy Edwards =

American singer-songwriter (1922–1969)

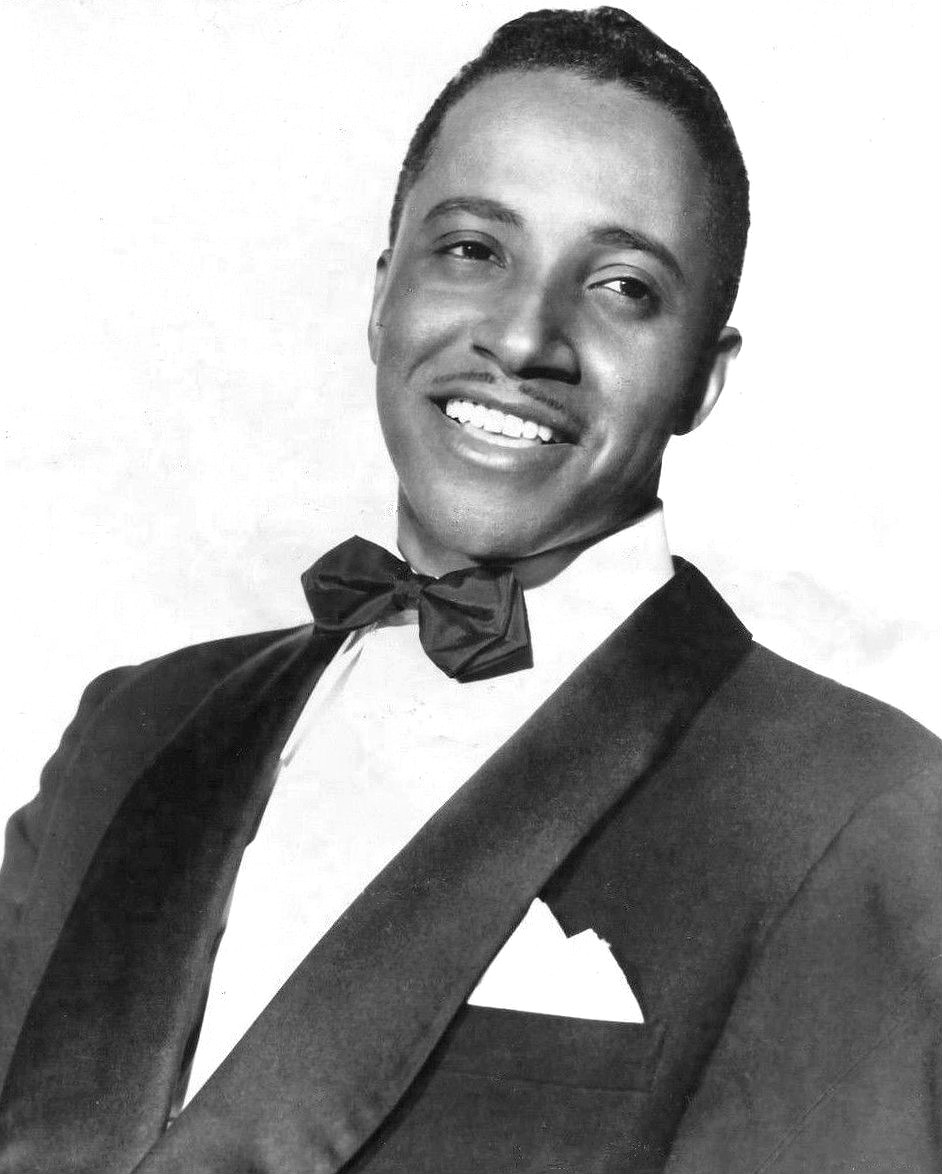

Background information
- Born: Thomas Jefferson Edwards; February 17, 1922; Richmond, Virginia, U.S.
- Died: October 23, 1969 (aged 47) Henrico County, Virginia, U.S.
- Genres: R&B; jazz; pop
- Occupations: Singer, songwriter
- Years active: 1946–1969
- Label: MGM

Thomas Jefferson Edwards (February 17, 1922 – October 23, 1969) was an American singer and songwriter. His most successful record was the multi-million-selling song "It's All in the Game", becoming the first African-American to reach No. 1 on the Billboard Hot 100.

== Career ==
Born in Richmond, Virginia, Edwards had his own radio show in Richmond the 1940s. In 1946, Edwards wrote "That Chick's Too Young to Fry", which was a sizable hit for Louis Jordan. Edwards began recording for the music label in 1949. He moved to New York in 1950, and recorded a few demos. When MGM heard his demos, they gave him a recording contract, but more for his voice rather than his compositions. Edwards first recorded four songs for MGM, including his own song "All Over Again".

Edwards was a singer most remembered for his 1958 hit "It's All in the Game", which appeared in the list of Billboard number-one singles of 1958. He sang his hit song on The Ed Sullivan Show, on September 14, 1958. The song was composed by then-future U.S. Vice-President Charles G. Dawes in 1911 as "Melody in A Major" with lyrics written in 1951 by Carl Sigman. Edwards originally recorded and charted the song in 1951, but it climbed to only No. 18. The better-known 1958 version was on the same record label (MGM) and was backed by the same orchestra leader (Leroy Holmes), but with a different arrangement more suited to the rock and roll-influenced style of the time. As well as topping the U.S. Billboard Hot 100, the song also got to number one on the R&B chart and the UK Singles Chart. The single sold over 3.5 million copies globally, earning gold disc status. The gold disc was presented in November 1958. His second biggest hit was his 1959 re-recording of "Please, Mr. Sun" (written by Ramon Martin Getzov and Sid Frank), which reached No. 11. Another of Edwards' hits was "Love Is All We Need" which reached No. 15 on the Billboard Hot 100.

Although Edwards recorded a number of other songs, none came close to achieving the same level of success, though several of his songs later became hits for other artists, such as "A Fool Such as I" by Elvis Presley, "It's All in the Game" by Cliff Richard and the Four Tops (Eddie Holman's version of it was the B-side of his hit "Hey There Lonely Girl"), "Please Love Me Forever" by Cathy Jean and the Roommates (1961) and by Bobby Vinton (1967), and "Morning Side of the Mountain" recorded by Donny and Marie Osmond.

On October 23, 1969, Edwards died at the age of 47 from massive internal hemorrhaging due to esophageal varices linked to cirrhosis, per his death certificate. He is interred at the Quioccasin Baptist Church Cemetery in Henrico, Virginia. His headstone says he was born on October 15, 1922, but his death certificate says he was born October 12, 1926. The 1930 census indicates that his correct birth year is 1922. The informant was his sister, Buena.

Edwards received a Virginia Highway Marker in 2008, erected near Pemberton Elementary School, off Quioccasin Road, in Henrico County. In July 2008, Richmond mayor L. Douglas Wilder signed a proclamation declaring October 15, 2008 "Tommy Edwards Day".

In September 2012, Cherry Red Records label Shout issued a double CD collection of Edwards's work, entitled It's All in the Game (The MGM Recordings 1958–1960), which comprised his first four MGM albums and singles from the two years following that single's huge success.

== Country and western crossover album ==
In 1961, Edwards broke new ground by releasing a studio album entitled Golden Country Hits. His album of country interpretations predated Ray Charles' Modern Sounds in Country and Western Music and featured covers of some of the same song choices, including "You Don't Know Me", a popular crossover ballad by country songwriter Cindy Walker.

== Partial discography ==
=== Albums ===
- Tommy Edwards Sings — Regent MG 6096 (Mono only)–1958
- It's All in the Game — MGM E (Mono)/SE (Stereo) 3732–1958
- For Young Lovers — MGM E/SE 3670–1959
- You Started Me Dreaming — MGM E/SE 3805–1959
- Tommy Edwards — Lion L 70120 (Mono only)–1959
- Tommy Edwards in Hawaii — MGM E/SE 3838–1960
- Stardust — MGM E/SE 4020–1960
- Step Out Singing — MEM E/SE 3822–1960
- Tommy Edwards' Greatest Hits — MGM E/SE 3884–1961
- Tommy Edwards Sings Golden Country Hits — MGM E/SE 3959–1961
- Soft Strings and Two Guitars — MGM E/SE 4060–1962
- The Very Best of Tommy Edwards — MGM E/SE 4141–1963
- Tommy Edwards — Metro M (Mono)/MS (Stereo) 511–1965

=== Singles ===
Year	Single Both sides from same album except where indicated	Chart positions			Album
Year	Single Both sides from same album except where indicated	^{US}	^{U.S. R&B}	^{UK}	Album
1951	"Once There Lived a Fool" b/w "A Friend of Johnny's"				Non-album singles
1951	"Gypsy Heart" b/w "Operetta"				Non-album singles
1951	"I'll Never Know Why" b/w "A Beggar in Love"				Non-album singles
1951	"The Morning Side of the Mountain" b/w "F'r Instance"	24			Non-album singles
1951	"Christmas Is for Children" b/w "Kris Kringle"				Non-album singles
1951	"It's All in the Game"	18			Non-album singles
1951	"All Over Again"		10		Non-album singles
1952	"Please, Mr. Sun" b/w "I May Live with You"	22			Non-album singles
1952	"Forgive Me" b/w "The Bridge"				Non-album singles
1952	"My Girl" b/w "Piano, Bass and Drums"				Non-album singles
1952	"Easy to Say" b/w "The Greatest Sinner of Them All"				Non-album singles
1952	"You Win Again" b/w "Sinner and Saint" (non-album track)	13			It's All in the Game
1953	"Now and Then, There's a Fool Such as I" b/w "I Can't Love Another" (non-album track)	24			It's All in the Game
1953	"Au Revoir" b/w "I Lived When I Met You"				Non-album singles
1953	"Take These Chains from My Heart" b/w "Paging Mr. Jackson"				Non-album singles
1953	"Baby, Baby, Baby" b/w "Lover's Waltz"	26			Non-album singles
1953	"So Little Time" b/w "Blue Bird"				Non-album singles
1953	"Every Day Is Christmas" b/w "It's Christmas Once Again"				Non-album singles
1954	"Secret Love" b/w "That's All" (from It's All in the Game)	28			Non-album singles
1954	"There Was a Time" b/w "Wall of Ice" (from Tommy Edwards)				Non-album singles
1954	"The Joker (In the Card Game of Life)" b/w "Within My Heart"				Non-album singles
1954	"Linger in My Arms" b/w "If You Would Love Me Again"				Tommy Edwards
1954	"You Walk By" b/w "I Have That Kind of Heart"				Tommy Edwards
1955	"Serenade to a Fool" b/w "It Could Have Been Me"				Non-album single
1955	"Welcome to My Heart" b/w "Spring Never Came Around This Year" (non-album track)				Tommy Edwards
1955	"Teardrop on a Rose" b/w "To Those Who Wait"				Non-album single
1955	"Baby, Let Me Take You Dreaming" b/w "My Sweetheart" (non-album track)				Tommy Edwards
1956	"Love Is a Child" b/w "There Must Be a Way to Your Heart" (non-album track)				Tommy Edwards
1956	"The Day That I Lost You" b/w "My Ship" (from Tommy Edwards)				Non-album single
1957	"We're Not Children Anymore" b/w "Any Place, Any Time" (non-album track)				Tommy Edwards
1958	"It's All in the Game" (new version) /	1	1	1	It's All in the Game
1958	"Please Love Me Forever"	61			It's All in the Game
1958	"Love Is All We Need" b/w "Mr. Music Man"	15			It's All in the Game
1959	"Please, Mr. Sun" (new version) /	11	18		It's All in the Game
1959	"The Morning Side of the Mountain" (new version)	27			It's All in the Game
1959	"My Melancholy Baby" /	26	27	29	For Young Lovers
1959	"It's Only the Good Times"	86			For Young Lovers
1959	"I've Been There" /	53			Tommy Edwards' Greatest Hits
1959	"I Looked at Heaven"	100			For Young Lovers
1959	"(New In) The Ways of Love" /	47			Tommy Edwards' Greatest Hits
1959	"Honestly and Truly"	65			Non-album single
1960	"Don't Fence Me In" b/w "I'm Building Castles Again" (from You Started Me Dreaming)	45			Tommy Edwards' Greatest Hits
1960	"I Really Don't Want to Know" b/w "Unloved"	18			Tommy Edwards' Greatest Hits
1960	"It's Not the End of Everything" b/w "Blue Heartaches"	78			Tommy Edwards' Greatest Hits
1960	"Suzie Wong" b/w "As You Desire Me"				Stardust
1961	"Vaya Con Dios" b/w "One and Twenty"				Stardust
1961	"The Golden Chain" b/w "That's the Way with Love"				Non-album single
1961	"I'm So Lonesome I Could Cry" b/w "My Heart Would Know"				Tommy Edwards Sings Golden Country Hits
1962	"I'll Cry You Out of My Heart" b/w "Tables Are Turning" (non-album track)				Stardust
1962	"Please Don't Tell Me" b/w "Tonight I Won't Be There"				Non-album singles
1963	"May I" b/w "Sometimes You Win, Sometimes You Lose"				Non-album singles
1963	"Country Boy" b/w "Love Is Best of All"				Non-album singles
1964	"Leftover Dreams" b/w "9 Chances Out of 10"				Non-album singles
1965	"Take These Chains from My Heart" b/w "You Win Again"				The Very Best of Tommy Edwards
1966	"I Must Be Doing Something Wrong" b/w "I Cried, I Cried"				Non-album single

=== Production notes ===
The recording "Honestly and Truly" is only heard on Compact Disc in mono, because the original stereo master tape was either lost or destroyed.

The recording "Take These Chains from My Heart" is heard on Compact Disc in re-channeled stereo because, as with the above song, the original stereo master was lost or destroyed.

These recordings were issued on the MGM record label unless otherwise noted.

"It's All in the Game" (1958 version) was produced by Harry Myerson. He is assumed to be the producer for all tracks from this point forward, although this cannot be confirmed.

The orchestra was conducted and the arrangements were made on all records by LeRoy Holmes.

== Television appearances ==
- Sing It Again (1951)
- Perry Como's Kraft Music Hall (1951–1952)
- Songs for Sale (1952)
- The Ed Sullivan Show (1958)
- The Arthur Murray Party (1958)

== See also ==
- List of artists who reached number one on the Hot 100 (U.S.)
- List of artists who reached number one on the Billboard R&B chart
- List of artists who reached number one on the UK Singles Chart
- List of artists who reached number one on the Australian singles chart
- List of number-one rhythm and blues hits (United States)
