= Jen and Kat =

American electropop duo

- Origin: Portland, Oregon, U.S.
- Genres: Pop; electropop; pop rock; electronic rock; folk-pop
- Instruments: Vocals; ukulele; guitar; piano; bass
- Years active: 2007–present
- Labels: Jen and Kat Records
- Members: Jeni Niquette; Kyndi Niquette
- Website: jenandkat.com

Jen and Kat are an American electropop duo that consists of sisters Jeni Niquette and Kyndi Niquette. Their television debut was on MTV in 2007, when they co-starred in The Countdown to Newport Harbor: The Real Orange County, a segment filmed and produced by MTV Studios. While shooting the video for MTV in New York, the sisters also starred in Clean & Clear's Morning Burst Shine Control Cleanser campaign, and appeared on Demanded, an On-Demand original program from Music Choice, co-hosted by a different chart-topping music artist every episode. Their credits have gone on to include work with Summit Entertainment, IFC, LAIKA, Nike, SanDisk, and others.

In October 2013, Jen and Kat joined the video-sharing app Vine where their videos were viewed over 21 million times. In March 2015 Jen and Kat's first music single, Better Place, was released worldwide, and in November 2015 their four-song electropop EP entitled Here and Now followed suit. In 2016, Jen and Kat won the Best Music category in the Armstrong Vine Awards, hosted at Mashable headquarters. In November 2017, Jen and Kat released their debut album, The Sound of Goodbye, making a return to their acoustic pop roots, a style first heard in their 2015 single Better Place. Nine singles were released between 2018 and 2020: “Until You Know”, “There’s You, There’s Me”, “Speaking in Code“, “3-Minute Warning”, “Digital Starlight”, “Never Slowing Down”, “Bad Bad”, “Are You Still There”, and “We Pretend”. In 2020, Jen and Kat produced beats for the seamlessly looping video app Byte that can be used in video creation. On October 29, 2020, the action-adventure game Watch Dogs: Legion, published by Ubisoft, was released and Jen and Kat's lead singing could be heard in the songs “Over My Shoulder” and “I Am Your Virus” through the in-game vehicle radio as players traveled the streets of a futuristic, dystopian London. On May 7, 2021, Jen and Kat released a 5-song electropop EP entitled “Get to You” and the following week their first official music video for the third track on their EP entitled “Can't Shake the Feeling” was published on YouTube. Their singing will be heard in the edgy pirate love song “Hey There, Sailor” in the upcoming video game Beyond Good and Evil 2, speculated to arrive between 2022 and 2023. The sisters have performed on two cross-country tours, and their TikToks have been viewed 122 million times as of February 2022.

== Discography ==
=== Albums ===
- The Sound of Goodbye (November 2017)

=== EPs ===
- Get to You (May 2021)
- Here and Now (November 2015)

=== Singles ===
- Stormy Clouds (August 2021)
- I'm Awake (July 2021)
- We Have Arrived (July 2021)
- Get To You (May 2021)
- We Pretend (October 2020)
- Are You Still There (July 2019)
- Bad Bad (June 2019)
- Never Slowing Down (May 2019)
- Digital Starlight (April 2019)
- 3-Minute Warning (March 2019)
- Scream It Louder (February 2019)
- Speaking in Code (January 2019)
- There's You, There's Me (November 2018)
- Until You Know (October 2018)
- All I Wanna Do (December 2017)
- Better Place (March 2015)

== Awards and nominations ==
| Year | Award | Category | Work | Result |
|---|---|---|---|---|
| 2016 | Armstrong Vine Awards | Best Music | Jen and Kat's music Vines | Won |
