= Marilyn Borden =

American actress and singer (1932–2009)

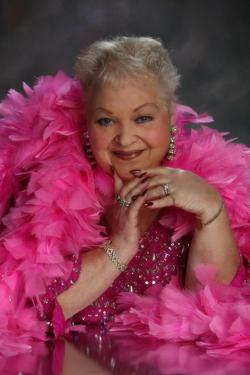
- Born: Marilyn Reeva Borden; May 29, 1932; Hartford, Connecticut, US
- Died: March 25, 2009 (aged 76); Modesto, California, US
- Occupations: Actress, singer
- Spouse: Herman "Ted" Thiel (1968–2007; his death)

Marilyn Borden (May 29, 1932 – March 25, 2009) was an American actress and singer who with her sister, Rosalyn "Roz" Borden, were known as the Borden Twins. The duo are best-remembered for their appearance on I Love Lucy playing "Teensy and Weensy" in the episode "Tennessee Bound" (1955).

Although never anything other than supporting players, the duo performed in several venues, including gigs on the nightclub circuit, as well as larger events including Rose Bowl. The twins also performed at countless USO shows at home and overseas, and worked with such entertainers as: Lucille Ball, Dean Martin, Jerry Lewis, Andy Williams, Sammy Davis Jr., Jimmy Durante, Bea Arthur, Rue McClanahan and Bob Newhart.

== Biography ==
=== Early life ===
Marilyn and Rosalyn Borden were born in Hartford, Connecticut on May 29, 1932, to Harry (1906–1973) and Elizabeth Borden (1909–1995) and would be followed by a younger sister, Barbara, in 1945. Shortly after the birth of Barbara, Harry left the family.

The Borden Twins got into acting with the encouragement of their parents and as children worked with such famous actors including Bill Robinson. At age four, they performed on a local radio show with Ed Begley in their hometown of Hartford. As teenagers, their family moved to Los Angeles. In high school, they started doing network television. In 1951, they caught the eye of Gene Kelly who wanted to get them a part in Singin' in the Rain. They can only be seen as extras in large crowd scenes.

=== Career ===
The Twins would appear on several television shows including The Spike Jones Show and became regular performers on The Jimmy Durante Show. The twins soon began their association with Jimmy Durante that would span seven years, appearing on many of his TV shows and travelling in his nightclub act. Between their work with Durante, the twins played local nightclubs and travelled with the U.S.O. entertaining servicemen in Korea, Japan, and the Philippines.

=== Television ===
While appearing on an episode of The Ed Wynn Show the twins caught the attention of Lucille Ball, who promised them she would find a part for them on I Love Lucy. True to her word, Ball featured the twins in episode 112, "Tennessee Bound", in which they played the sheriff's daughters, 'Teensy' and Weensy', opposite Tennessee Ernie Ford.

The twins continued work on television and appeared on CHiPs, Maude, and The Ropers. In the 1970s and 1980s the twins worked on the San Francisco-based morning show A.M. San Francisco as fitness experts. Also in the 1980s they began work with Bob Newhart in his stage show in Las Vegas and Lake Tahoe.

Roz and Marilyn were last seen together on television on the 1998 All-Star Tribute to Aaron Spelling. They would continue to appear at Lucy conventions in California and Jamestown, New York, but they had gotten into the travel business and booked cruise tours on which they would perform.

=== Roz's death ===
Roz had been ill for several years, and the twins moved from the San Francisco Bay area to Modesto, California.

On May 29, 2002, the twins celebrated their 70th birthday, but Roz's health soon declined and she died of liver failure on January 23, 2003, at the age of 70. After her sister's death, Marilyn became a volunteer for the local community hospice, a position she retained for the next four years. In May 2003, Marilyn made her first trip without Roz to Jamestown for the annual "Loving Lucy Festival". She would return again in 2005.

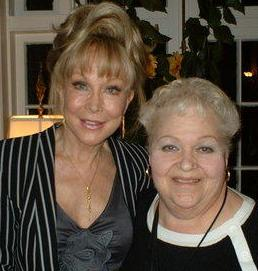
Marilyn Borden at the 2005 Lucy convention with headliner Barbara Eden.

=== Later years ===
After Roz's death, Marilyn started a solo career. She appeared in the Modesto Area Senior Spotlight Show, and in October 2006, Marilyn gave a concert from her home in Modesto, alongside her younger sister, San Francisco area musician Barbara Borden.

In March 2007 she put together a show called "The Senior Divas", and performed along with jazz singer Miss Delta and newcomer Shirley Hausner. Their first show on March 24, 2007, was to a sell out audience.

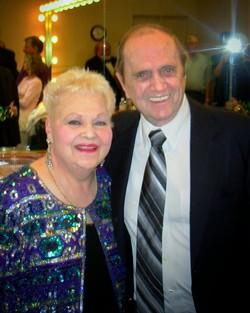
Marilyn Borden reunited in concert with Bob Newhart May 18, 2007

On May 18, 2007, Marilyn was re-united with her old boss Bob Newhart when she opened for him at his show in Turlock, California.

=== Marriage ===
Marilyn was married to Herman Theodore "Ted" Thiel Jr. from March 2, 1968, until his death on December 4, 2007. The couple had no children together. But she did have a stepson Herman " Ted" Thiel III and 6 step grandchildren- Shawna Thiel, David Vargas, Lori Flores (Thiel), Naomi Thiel, Herman Thiel IV and Shelby Carr. Along with 13 great-grandchildren.

=== Death ===
Marilyn Borden Thiel died of heart failure at 9:45 am on Wednesday, March 25, 2009, in Modesto, California, aged 76.

== Television ==
- Four Star Revue (1 episode; 1952)
- The Spike Jones Show (two appearances)
- The Jimmy Durante Show (1955–1957 regular performer)
- I Love Lucy (episode 112 "Tennessee Bound" January 24, 1955 as Teensy)
- CHiPs ... Lottie Tidwell (1 episode, 1977)
- Maude ... Monica (1 episode, 1978)
- Apple Pie ... Trudy Laskey (1 episode, 1978)
- The Ropers ... Hetty (1 episode, 1979)
- Lottery! ... Flora (1 episode, 1984)
- The Joan Rivers Show ... (as herself; 1989)
- Out of This World ... Buffalo Breath Twin (1 episode, 1990)
- All-Star Party for Aaron Spelling 1998 (as herself)
