= Please Love Me Forever =

1958 song with revivals in 1960 and 1967

Single by Tommy Edwards

from the album It's All in the Game
- A-side: "It's All in the Game"
- Released: 1958
- Length: 2:32
- Label: MGM
- Songwriters: John Malone & Ollie Blanchard

Tommy Edwards singles chronology
"It's All in the Game" (1958)	"Please Love Me Forever" (1958)	"Love Is All We Need" (1958)

"Please Love Me Forever" is a song written by John Malone and Ollie Blanchard. The song was originally released by Tommy Edwards in 1958. Hit versions were later released by Cathy Jean and the Roommates in 1960 and Bobby Vinton in 1967.

== Tommy Edwards version ==
Tommy Edwards released "Please Love Me Forever" as the B-side of his million-selling, number-one hit version of It's All in the Game in 1958. Edwards' version of "Please Love Me Forever" spent 3 weeks on the Billboard Hot 100 chart, peaking at No. 61.

== Cathy Jean and the Roommates version ==
"Please Love Me Forever"

Single by Cathy Jean and the Roommates

from the album At the Hop!
- B-side: "Canadian Sunset"
- Released: 1960
- Genre: Doo wop
- Length: 2:53
- Label: Valmor
- Songwriters: John Malone & Ollie Blanchard

Cathy Jean and the Roommates released a cover of "Please Love Me Forever" in 1960. Their version was released as a single and on the album At the Hop! It spent 12 weeks on the Billboard Hot 100 chart in 1961, peaking at No. 12, while reaching No. 23 on Canada's CHUM Hit Parade.

The song also reached No. 10 on the Cash Box Top 100 in 1961, in a tandem ranking of Cathy Jean and the Roommates and Sunny Gale's versions, with Cathy Jean and the Roommates' version marked as a bestseller.

Cathy Jean and the Roommates' version was ranked No. 88 on Cash Box's "Top 100 Chart Hits of 1961".

== Bobby Vinton version ==
"Please Love Me Forever"

Single by Bobby Vinton

from the album Please Love Me Forever
- B-side: "Miss America"
- Released: September 1, 1967
- Recorded: December 8, 1966
- Genre: Pop
- Length: 2:34
- Label: Epic
- Songwriters: John Malone & Ollie Blanchard
- Producer: Billy Sherrill

Bobby Vinton singles chronology
"Red Roses for Mom" (1967)	"Please Love Me Forever" (1967)	"Just as Much as Ever" (1967)

In 1967, Bobby Vinton released the most successful version of "Please Love Me Forever" as a single and on his album of the same name. Vinton's version spent 13 weeks on the Billboard Hot 100 chart, peaking at No. 6, while reaching No. 5 on the Cash Box Top 100, No. 5 on Record World's "100 Top Pops", No. 1 on Canada's RPM 100, No. 4 in the Philippines, No. 8 in Venezuela, and No. 39 on Billboard's Easy Listening chart.

Vinton's version was ranked No. 43 on Billboard's end of year ranking "Top Records of 1967: Hot 100 – 1967", while being ranked No. 46 on Cash Box's "Top 100 Chart Hits of 1967", and No. 30 on "The RPM 100 Top Singles of 1967".

=== Charts ===
Chart (1967)	Peak position
U.S. Billboard Hot 100	6
