= Cathy Jean and the Roommates =

American vocal group

The Roommates
- Also known as: The Roomates
- Origin: Queens, New York, U.S.
- Genres: Doo-wop; pop
- Years active: 1960–1965; 1970s; present
- Labels: Promo Records; Valmor Records; Cameo Records; Philips Records
- Members: Jerry Pilgrim; Shelly Wengrovsky; Carlos Rampolla
- Past members: Steve Susskind; Bob Minsky; Jack Carlson; Felix Alvarez; Cathy Jean Giordano

Cathy Jean and the Roommates (also spelled Roomates) are an American vocal group who recorded in the early 1960s, and had a US pop hit in 1961 with "Please Love Me Forever". A version of the group, fronted by original singer Cathy Jean Giordano (now Cathy Jean Ruiz), still performs.

== Career ==
The Roommates were originally a duo formed by 15-year-olds Steve Susskind (born Steven R. Susskind; October 3, 1942 – January 21, 2005) and Bob Minsky (born Robert L. Minsky; October 10, 1942 – August 25, 2006), of Russell Sage Junior High in Queens, New York. After placing second in a local talent show—behind another duo, Tom & Jerry, who later became better known as Simon & Garfunkel—they became a quartet, adding singers Jack Carlson and Felix Alvarez in 1960. The group released their first record, a cover of Kitty Wells' hit "Making Believe", on the Promo label. Their managers, Gene and Jody Malis, then set up their own label, Valmor. For their first release they recorded teenager Cathy Jean Giordano (born 8 September 1945, Brooklyn, New York) singing "Please Love Me Forever", a song that had been a minor hit in 1958 for Tommy Edwards and would become a hit again in 1967 for Bobby Vinton. Before releasing the record, the Malises overdubbed harmonies by the Roommates; Cathy Jean and the group had never met in person when the record was issued. Credited to Cathy Jean and the Roommates, and promoted by leading radio DJ "Murray the K", the record rose to #12 in the Billboard pop chart in early 1961.

The Roommates then had success with their own record, "Glory of Love", a song first recorded in 1936 by Benny Goodman and an R&B chart hit in 1951 for The Five Keys. The Roommates' version reached #49 on the chart. The group continued to back Cathy Jean on her later singles, toured with her and recorded an album, Cathy Jean and the Roomates; however, none was successful, and Cathy Jean soon retired from the music business. The Roommates later recorded for the Cameo and Philips labels, with little success, and the group split up in 1965.

In the late 1960s, Cathy Jean came back to do a revival show. This turned into another stretch of performances that lasted until 1973. The "Roommates" at that time comprised Nick Cardell, Artie Loria, Tommy White and Carmine Graziano. They were a regular on the "Gus Gossert" Revival Show Series at the New York venue, the Academy Of Music. They also played the club circuit and molded the show in that fashion when playing The Copacabana in NYC, The Sas Susan on Long Island and dinner theaters. Cathy took a hiatus midway through this tenure, and was replaced by JoAnne Greco, the daughter of singer Buddy Greco. They released a single that just managed to break into the charts and receive airplay as The Roommates. "A Place Called Love" b/w "Knowing You", was released on Ban Records in 1970 and was the group's final chart entry. The songs were credited to Loria and Cardell as writers.

== Later activities ==
Steve Susskind later became a successful character actor. He died in an automobile accident on January 21, 2005, at age 62. Bob Minsky died of lung cancer on August 25, 2006, at age 63. Art Loria died in October 2010 after a successful, post-Roommates, career performing and recording with such acts as the Belmonts, Larry Chance and the Earls and the Doo Wop All Stars.

Cathy Jean Giordano married and, as Cathy Jean Ruiz, hosted a Long Island radio show in the late 1980s. She recorded a comeback single, "You Don't Have to Say You Love Me", in 1991. Soon afterwards, she formed a new version of Cathy Jean and the Roommates, who continue to perform in and around New York as of 2012. Current members of the Roommates are Jerry Pilgrim, Shelly Wengrovsky, and Carlos Rampolla.

== Discography ==
=== Albums ===
Year	Album	U.S. label
1961	At The Hop!	Valmor Records

=== Singles ===
Year	Single	U.S. label	Billboard Hot 100
1960	"Sunday Kind of Love / A Lovely Way to Spend an Evening"	Cameo 233	–
1961	"Please Love Me Forever / Canadian Sunset"	Valmor 007	12
1961	"Make Me Smile Again / Sugar Cake"	Valmor 009	–
1961	"One Love / I Only Want You"	Valmor 011	–
1962	"Believe Me / Double Trouble"	Philips 40143	–
1962	"Please Tell Me / Sugar Cake"	Valmor 016	–
1963	"Gee / Answer Me, My Love"	Philips 40195	–
1963	"Please Don't Cheat On Me / The Nearness of You"	Philips 40153	–
