= Larry Coleman (composer) =

American popular composer and lyricist

Larry Coleman was a 20th-century American popular composer and lyricist.

Coleman was mainly active during the 1950s and 1960s. He wrote hit songs both alone and in collaboration with other lyricists, including Fred Ebb, Joe Darion, Norman Gimbel, and Paul Klein.

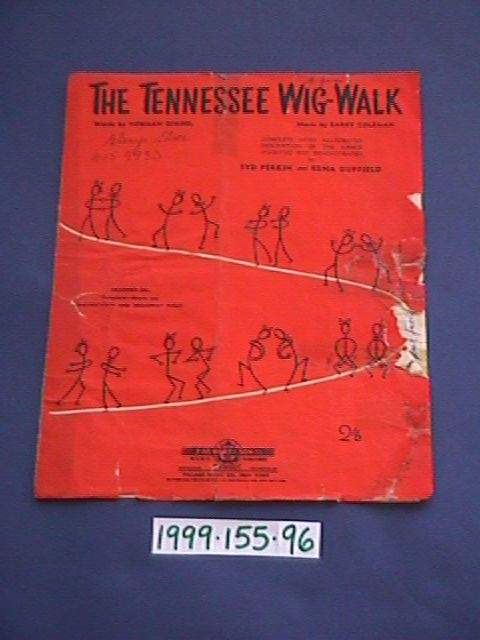
Sheet music for "The Tennessee Wig-Walk"

His songs included:

- "Changing Partners" (1953), recorded by many artists, including Bing Crosby, Frank "Pee Wee" King, Patti Page, Dinah Shore, and Kay Starr
- "Pa-Paya Mama" (1953), recorded by Perry Como
- "Ricochet" (1953), recorded by Teresa Brewer, Alma Cogan, Perry Como, and Joan Regan
- "Tennessee Wig Walk" (1953), recorded by Bonnie Lou
- "Good and Lonesome" (1955), recorded by Kay Starr
- "Just as Much as Ever" (1959), recorded by Teresa Brewer, Alma Cogan, Nat King Cole, Joan Regan, and Bobby Vinton
- "James Dean", by Jimmy Walker & George Cates and His Orchestra
- "Wanna' Laugh?", music by Johnny Lehmann, (1959) by Sue Raney in Songs for a Raney Day (Capitol, 1960)

"Ricochet" (aka "Ricochet Romance") was used in the 1954 comedy Western film Ricochet Romance.
