= Out of This World (American TV series) =

American television sitcom (1987–1991)

- Genre: Fantasy; Sitcom
- Created by: John Boni; Bob Booker
- Starring: Maureen Flannigan; Donna Pescow; Doug McClure; Joe Alaskey; Steve Burton; Christina Nigra; Buzz Belmondo; Tom Nolan
- Voices of: Burt Reynolds
- Opening theme: "Swinging on a Star"
- Ending theme: "Swinging on a Star" (instrumental)
- Composer: Kevin Kiner
- Country of origin: United States
- Original language: English
- No. of seasons: 4
- No. of episodes: 96

Production
- Executive producer: Bob Booker
- Producers: John Boni; Barbara Booker; Gail Honigberg; Laura Levine; Mike Scully; Bruce Taylor; George Yanok
- Running time: 22 minutes
- Production companies: Bob Booker Productions; MCA TV

Original release
- Network: Syndication
- Release: September 17, 1987 – May 25, 1991

Out of This World is an American fantasy sitcom about a teenage girl who is half alien, which gives her unique supernatural powers. It first aired in syndication from September 17, 1987, and ended on May 25, 1991. The series stars Maureen Flannigan as Evie Garland and Donna Pescow as her mother, with Burt Reynolds providing the uncredited voice of her alien father, who communicates with Evie through a device called "the Cube." Produced by Bob Booker Productions and MCA TV, the show ran for four seasons and 96 episodes.

During its first season, the series was originally part of NBC's Prime Time Begins at 7:30 campaign, in which the network's owned-and-operated stations would run first-run sitcoms in the 7:30–8:00 p.m. time slot to counter-program competing stations' game shows, sitcom reruns and other offerings. Out of This World was rotated with four other shows: the original series Marblehead Manor and She's the Sheriff, a syndicated revival of the 1983 sitcom We Got It Made, and a television adaptation of the play You Can't Take It with You. NBC ended the experiment after the 1987–88 season due to the low ratings put up by three of the series, which were cancelled. Out of This World was renewed, as was She's the Sheriff.

After its first season, Out of This World began airing primarily on weekends. Despite receiving mostly negative reviews from critics, it lasted three more seasons.

== Show summary ==
The series revolves around Evie Ethel Garland, a young girl who discovers on her 13th birthday that her father Troy is an alien from the planet Antareus. Evie's half-alien heritage gives her supernatural abilities, with most of the episodes revolving around Evie misusing her powers and causing some trouble which she spends the rest of the episode fixing.

Only Evie and her family know about the alien side; many episodes depict their efforts to hide her secret from other characters. After four seasons, the series ended on a cliffhanger: Troy came to visit and Donna took his place by accident, ending up on Antareus while Troy was stranded on Earth.

=== The Cube ===
Evie is able to communicate with Troy through a special laser genetic communication device known as the "cube," which he gave to her when she turned 13. The cube effectively functioned as a telephone line to Antareus. There are no controls on the cube; Evie simply calls for her father, and the cube activates when he answered. Depending on the plotline, Troy manifests his powers while talking through the cube, emitting a beam of energy directly from the cube.

Evie and Donna normally keep the cube around the house, sometimes telling people it is an ornament, a talking clock, a toaster radio/phone, or a candy dish, amongst other common household items. When the cube is activated, the top half of it opens up on a hinge with a magenta light pulsing inside, with a "spacey" sound effect.

Originally, even though everyone is able to hear Troy through the cube, Evie is the only one whom Troy could hear, as the cube was described to be "genetic." This later changed to Troy hearing Donna and they could talk back and forth.

== Characters ==
- Evie Ethel Garland (portrayed by Maureen Flannigan) — A half-human, half-alien girl who lives with her mother Donna in Marlowe, California (a fictional analogue of Carmel-by-the-Sea), in a house overlooking the sea. An only child, Evie attends a school for gifted children that her mother runs, and achieves good grades there. Her father describes her as "the perfect child: loving; caring; with the same needs of most teenagers". The series follows Evie through her teenage years, from her 13th birthday in the pilot to her 18th birthday in the final episode. Donna had always told Evie that her father was a secret agent, but on her 13th birthday, Evie developed superhuman abilities; it was then revealed that her father is a native of another planet. Evie's most frequently used power is her ability to freeze time on Earth by touching her index-fingertips together; this allows her to alter the course of Earthly events by maneuvering herself and/or others as desired. When she claps her hands together, time resumes as normal. She can also "unfreeze" individuals by touching them while time is frozen. Evie later gains the power to gleep, which allows her to manifest objects using only her mind. On her sixteenth birthday, she is given her choice of a new power (including levitation, invisibility, and eight others) and is seen experimenting with several, but declines to make any of them permanent. For one episode near the end of the series ("Evie's Three Promises"), she gains the ability to teleport. Although she was the leading character, Flannigan was billed last in the credits. In the first season, she received the billing "And Introducing Maureen Flannigan". Starting with the second season, she received a different billing: "And Maureen Flannigan as Evie".
- Donna Froelich-Garland (portrayed by Donna Pescow) — Evie's mother. Described by her husband as "an ambitious working mother with a career", Donna is the principal of a school for gifted children, which Evie attends. She later starts her own catering company called "Donna's Delights". Toward the end of season 3, Donna becomes the Mayor of Marlowe. Donna is very protective of her daughter, often to the dismay of Evie, who would like to be more independent. Donna, along with her brothers Beano and Mick, are the only regular characters on the show who know Evie's secret.
- Troy Garland (voiced by Burt Reynolds) — Evie's father. Troy is a human-looking extraterrestrial with many special powers, from the distant world of Antareus, where he is an astronaut. Troy met Donna when his spacecraft crashed on Earth at some point in the late 1960s or early 1970s. The two fell in love and were married in 1971; two years later, Donna gave birth to Evie. The year after that, Troy was recalled to participate in a war which raged on Antareus. Since then, Troy, while occasionally visiting Earth, stays in touch with his daughter via a special communication device known as the "cube". Troy's powers seem practically unlimited; although he lives on Antareus, he can control many things on Earth, from computers to the weather. He can also give and/or take away Evie's powers at will (as demonstrated in the second episode of the series), and is very good at keeping up with events on Earth. While Troy appears in the show's opening credits, he rarely makes a physical appearance, and when he does, his face is obscured (for example, via a surgical mask or shadows). In the series finale, when Troy arrives on Earth, he is seen in a silhouette with stars from the galaxy. Troy was credited as "himself" in the opening credits from Season Two onwards.
- Beano Froelich (portrayed by Joe Alaskey; 1987–1991) — Donna's brother and Evie's uncle who lives next door to them. Beano is a big eater and runs a diet clinic known as "Waist-a-Weigh", which is later renamed after him. Beano is one of the two regular characters who know Evie's secret, Donna being the other. He last appears in "Marlowe Vice".
- Kyle Applegate (portrayed by Doug McClure) — A former television actor who serves as the mayor of Marlowe. Kyle is a good friend of the family, but "the mayor" punishes even the smallest offenses. Kyle is dimwitted and gullible in addition to being egocentric and vain, often completely failing to notice Evie's "alien" antics. He clings to his former TV glory as the star of "Mosquito Man" and many long forgotten movies, mainly Westerns. Towards the end of season three, Donna takes over as the new mayor and appoints Kyle as the chief of police.
- Buzz (portrayed by Buzz Belmondo) — The manager of Beano's diet clinic, and one of the more eccentric characters in town. Buzz usually makes one brief appearance per episode, during which he performs a series of puns and/or prop-based gags...sometimes related to the elaborate costume that he is wearing. He speaks with an unknown accent, and is prone to bizarre behavior. Donna sometimes resorts to him for help, more often than not regretting it.
- Lindsay Selkirk (portrayed by Christina Nigra) — Evie's best female friend. She and Evie spend a lot of time together drinking milkshakes at their local diner called the "Goodie Goodie". Lindsay is Evie's confidante when it comes to boys and her non-Antarean related problems.
- Chris Fuller (portrayed by Steve Burton) — A surfer and high school student who later enrolls at Marlowe Community College. He is introduced as a new student and good basketball player in the season one episode "Evie Get Your Basketball". Chris becomes Evie's boyfriend, although they are more like brother and sister; sometimes they even date other people. In season four, Chris says Evie was and always will be his girl.
- Quigley Handlesman (portrayed by Carl Steven; 1987-1988) - One of Evie's classmates at Donna's school for the gifted.
- Phil (portrayed by John Roarke; 1987–1988) - The jovial, funny handyman who works on the Garlands' house during the first season. He is always snooping around in the family's business. Donna, Evie, and Beano constantly scramble to keep Phil from suspecting Evie's alien heritage.
- Jeffrey Cummings (portrayed by Tony Crane; 1990) - A high school classmate of Evie and Lindsay's who transfers in during their senior year. Incredibly handsome, basically picking where Chris left off after going to college, Jeffrey soon begins dating Evie...who is forced to juggle her relationships with him and with Chris.
- Peter (portrayed by Peter Pitofsky; 1990-1991) — A waiter at the Goodie Goodie who is introduced in the first episode of Season Four. He is a clumsy, goofball Antarean who provides his own brand of comic relief whenever Evie and her friends stop by the restaurant. He was military intelligence for Antareus until he chose to stay on Earth, his memory erased of all Antarean things. He has a penchant for misinterpreting people's orders, and sometimes even forgets his own name.
- Mick Froelich (portrayed by Tom Nolan; 1990-1991) — Donna and Beano's brother and Evie's uncle, who was introduced in "I Want My Evie TV" to replace Beano as a recurring character. He is a former rock musician.

=== Guest stars ===
The series featured several celebrities who made cameo appearances on the show, occasionally as themselves. In chronological order of appearances:

- Ann Miller
- Norman Fell as Evie's psychiatrist Dr. Hauser (in "The Nightmare", 1987)
- Scott Carpenter as himself, (in "Evie and the Young Astronauts", 1987)
- Charles Nelson Reilly as himself (in "Dueling Mayors", 1987)
- Betsy Palmer as Donna's mother, (in "Uh, Oh... Here Comes Mother", 1987 and “AKA Dad”, 1987)
- Tom Bosley as Troy's father (in "Guess Who's Coming to Earth", 1988 and "Around the World in Eighty Minutes", 1989)
- Jamie Farr (in "Go West, Young Mayor", 1988)
- Richard Kiel as Norman, (in "Go West, Young Mayor", 1988)
- Scott Baio (who also directed several episodes) made a cameo appearance in "Princess Evie" (1988) and "Evie Goes For the Gold" (1989)
- Lyle Alzado (in "Goodbye Mr. Chris", 1990)
- Mr. T (in "New Kid on the Block", 1990)
- Susan Anton (in "Best Friends", 1990)
- Tiffany (in "I Want My Evie TV", 1990)
- Florence Henderson (in "My Mom, and Why I Love Her")
- Kathleen Freeman as Miss Ogilvy, Evie's high school teacher (in "Educating Kyle", 1991)

== Episodes ==
=== Season 1 (1987–88) ===
No. overall	No. in season	Title	Directed by	Written by	Original release date
1	1	"Evie's Thirteenth Birthday"	Bob Claver	John Boni	September 17, 1987
It's Evie's thirteenth birthday, and during the party, her mother, Donna, is wrestling with a difficult decision alongside her brother, Beano, who is also Evie's uncle. Donna is unsure whether to reveal a lifelong secret to Evie: that her father is an alien living on a planet called Antareus. Before Donna can decide, Evie suddenly feels compelled to slowly touch her pointer fingers together. When she does, everyone around her freezes in time. After a brief moment of panic, she accidentally unfreezes her mother by touching her. With no other choice, Donna tells Evie that she is half-alien and that her powers seem to have activated. Though initially frightened, Evie quickly learns to cope with the revelation. Together, they unfreeze Uncle Beano and let him in on the secret. Donna then gives Evie a gift from her father—a mysterious alien cube that functions as an interplanetary phone to contact him. After speaking with her father and learning more about her history, Evie successfully unfreezes the rest of the party guests.
2	2	"Playing with the Power"	Jack Regas	Bob Booker	September 24, 1987
Evie begins to experiment with her newfound powers, but quickly learns that such abilities come with responsibility and should not be abused. The episode explores the consequences of her initial misuses of time manipulation.
3	3	"The Nightmare"	Bob Claver	John Boni	October 1, 1987
As Evie tries to come to terms with her half-alien identity, she starts experiencing disturbing nightmares. Donna and Evie decide to visit a psychiatrist to help Evie cope with the psychological impact of her extraordinary circumstances.
4	4	"Till Then"	Bob Claver	Dave Hackel & April Kelly	October 8, 1987
Evie tries out for the cheerleading squad, while her mother, Donna, becomes involved with Mayor Applegate on the Marlowe Centennial Committee.
5	5	"Evie, Get Your Basketball"	Jack Regas	Patricia Niedzialek & Cecile Alch	October 15, 1987
Evie has an innate talent for basketball. However, a chauvinistic classmate arrange for a new player named Chris to challenges her to a game, asserting that boys are superior to girls in sports. Evie develops a massive crush on Chris and must find a way to prove girls can win in sports but without losing Chris.
6	6	"Every Beano Has His Day"	Bob Claver	Richard Albrecht & Casey Keller	October 22, 1987
Evie develops a new ability: "gleeping," which allows her to materialize objects with her mind. When Uncle Beano is about to be honored by the mayor, Evie accidentally "gleeps" Beano and a dog to switch bodies, leading to a frantic effort by Evie and Donna to reverse the change before the ceremony.
7	7	"Evie and the Young Astronauts"	Jack Regas	Dave Hackel & April Kelly	October 29, 1987
Evie wins a NASA contest, impressing astronaut Scott Carpenter with her brilliant project. However, Carpenter intense questions about Evie's project leads to concerns about her alien father's involvement.
8	8	"Fifties Mom"	Bob Claver	Laura Levine	November 5, 1987
Evie wishes her mother, Donna, was more like the stereotypical 1950s television mothers. She uses her powers to make this wish a reality, but problems arise when Donna is scheduled to give a speech on modern women's rights, intended to prevent the city from closing a daycare center for working women. Evie must find a way to revert Donna back to her normal self.
9	9	"Dueling Mayors"	Bob Claver	Dave Hackel & April Kelly	November 12, 1987
Evie is covering a mayoral election, and Donna is actively involved in Mayor Applegate's campaign. Mayor Applegate faces stiff competition from another candidate, Charles Nelson Reilly, leading to a rivalry.
10	10	"Baby Talk"	Russ Petranto	Mike Scully	November 19, 1987
Evie gets her first babysitting job, taking care of baby Neil. When she wishes she could understand why the baby is crying, her "gleeping" powers inadvertently give baby Neil the ability to speak.
11	11	"Beano's New Diet Clinic"	Selig Frank	John Boni	November 26, 1987
Uncle Beano decides to open a new diet clinic while trying to help a young friend of Evie's who is dealing with weight issues.
12	12	"Uh, Oh... Here Comes Mother"	Jack Regas	George Tricker & Neil Rosen	December 3, 1987
Donna and Beano's mother comes to visit, creating complications as the family tries to maintain the secret of Troy's alien identity. They tell her that Troy is a CIA agent and cannot be present. The situation becomes more complex when their mother meets Mayor Kyle and starts to fall in love with him.
13	13	"The Anniversary"	Bob Claver	Tom Brauner	January 21, 1988
Donna is getting ready for her wedding anniversary with Troy, while Evie wrongly misinterprete her actions as having an affair with Phil the painter.
14	14	"To Tell the Truth"	Bob Claver	Frank Mula	January 28, 1988
Evie discovers an alien egg which has an unusual property: it makes anyone tell the absolute truth. This leads to a series of awkward and revealing confessions, creating chaos for Evie and Donna as they try to manage the truth-telling egg.
15	15	"Pen Pals"	Bob Claver	Frank Mula	February 4, 1988
Uncle Beano begins corresponding with a love interest through the mail. However, complications arise when it's discovered that Evie sent a picture of Mayor Applegate instead of Beano, leading to confusion and romantic entanglements.
16	16	"Broadway Danny Derek"	Bob Claver	George Tricker & Neil Rosen	February 11, 1988
Donna encourages Evie to befriend a new boy at school. Evie finds the boy obnoxious, but Donna insists he needs a friend. Donna then has an unpleasant encounter with the boy's equally obnoxious father. Evie decides to invite them over for dinner to show Donna what she has to deal with.
17	17	"Mosquito Man: The Motion Picture"	Bob Claver	Mike Scully	February 18, 1988
Mayor Applegate's past role as "Mosquito Man" is set to be revived in a motion picture. However, the plans for the film unfortunately proceed without him, leading to Mayor Applegate's disappointment and attempts to get involved.
18	18	"The Russians Are Coming"	Bob Claver	John Boni	February 25, 1988
Russian spies investigate a suspicious power source, and their search leads them directly to the Garland house, putting Evie's secret and the Cube at risk.
19	19	"a.k.a. Dad"	Bob Claver	Dave Hackel & April Kelly	April 21, 1988
Donna's mother visits Marlowe again, and she mistakenly believes Buzz is Troy (Evie's alien father) after seeing them doing an intimate dance.
20	20	"The Illness"	Russ Petranto	Donald Jordan	April 28, 1988
Evie begins to exhibit symptoms of an extraterrestrial sickness. When the doctor reveals one other case, it leads to questions about whether she is the only alien on Earth.
21	21	"The Box Is Missing"	Michael Dimich	Dave Hackel & April Kelly	May 5, 1988
The Cube, Evie's vital communication link to her father, goes missing. A detective is brought in to investigate the disappearance, creating a tense situation as Evie and Donna try to recover the Cube without revealing its true nature.
22	22	"Boy Crazy"	Bob Claver	Ed McCatty	May 12, 1988
Evie's mother, Donna, invites the minister's daughter, Leslie, over. However, Leslie is actually a boy and a punk singer whom Donna despises due to her prejudice against his appearance and music, leading her to forbid Evie from seeing him again.
23	23	"The Three Faces of Evie"	Bob Claver	Dave Hackel & April Kelly	May 19, 1988
Evie uses her power to gleep herself into an older girl in an attempt to win Chris over. However, a mishap causes her to becoming a five years old girl, leading to a challenging situation for Donna to handle.
24	24	"I've Got a Secret"	Bob Claver	Story by : Tom Brauner; Teleplay by : Robert Schechter	May 26, 1988
Evie's best friend, Lindsay, accidentally overhears Evie talking to her father through the Cube and discovers Evie's secret. Lindsay then inadvertently blabs the secret to Marsha Clawson, leading to the entire school knowing about Evie's powers. Evie and Donna must deal with the fallout from this widespread revelation.

=== Season 2 (1988–89) ===
No. overall	No. in season	Title	Directed by	Written by	Original release date
25	1	"Evie's Birthday Wish"	Bob Claver	Bob Booker	October 8, 1988
26	2	"Blast from the Past"	Bob Claver	Mike Scully	October 15, 1988
27	3	"Career Crunch"	Bob Claver	Frank Mula	October 22, 1988
28	4	"Should Old Acquaintance Be Forgot?"	Bob Claver	Tommy Thompson	October 29, 1988
29	5	"Evie's First Kiss"	Bob Claver	Sheldon Krasner & David Saling	November 5, 1988
30	6	"Princess Evie"	Bob Claver	Ted Bergman	November 12, 1988
31	7	"Old Flame"	Bob Claver	Laura Levine	November 19, 1988
32	8	"Guess Who's Coming to Earth"	Bob Claver	Bob Booker	November 26, 1988
33	9	"Go West Young Mayor"	Jack Regas	Tommy Thompson & Brian Scully	December 3, 1988
Kyle accompanies Evie, Donna, and Beano on a vacation to an old western town. When Evie, Donna, and Beano are taken hostage by counterfeiters, Kyle is the only one who can save them, due to Evie's inability to use her powers.
34	10	"Close Encounters of the Nerd Kind"	Selig Frank	Mike Lyons & Kimberly Wells	December 10, 1988
35	11	"The Incredible Hunk"	Selig Frank	Diana Ayers & Susan Sebastian	December 17, 1988
36	12	"Pupil's Court"	Bob Claver	Brian Scully & Tommy Thompson	January 28, 1989
37	13	"Evie's Two Dads"	Bob Claver	Mike Scully	February 4, 1989
38	14	"The Secret of Evie's Success"	Bob Claver	Robert Caplain	February 11, 1989
39	15	"Honest Evie"	Bob Claver	Frank Mula	February 18, 1989
40	16	"Evie Goes to Hollywood"	Jack Regas	Mike Scully	February 25, 1989
41	17	"Two Many Evies"	Jack Regas	Brian Scully	March 4, 1989
42	18	"Futile Attraction"	Bob Claver	Laura Levine	March 11, 1989
43	19	"Beano the Kid"	Scott Baio	Pamela Wick & Susan Cridland	April 29, 1989
44	20	"Queens for a Day"	Bob Claver	Tommy Thompson & Brian Scully	May 6, 1989
45	21	"The Amazing Evie"	Bob Claver	Laura Levine	May 13, 1989
46	22	"Whose House Is It, Anyway?"	Bob Claver	Mike Scully	May 20, 1989
47	23	"Frisky Business"	Bob Claver	Laura Levine	May 27, 1989
48	24	"Star Dog"	Bob Claver	Bob Booker	June 3, 1989

=== Season 3 (1989–90) ===
No. overall	No. in season	Title	Directed by	Written by	Original release date
49	1	"Evie's Sweet Sixteen"	Bob Claver	Bob Booker	October 7, 1989
50	2	"Cinderella Evie"	Bob Claver	Laura Levine	October 14, 1989
51	3	"Bring Me the Head of Donna Garland"	Bob Claver	Frank Mula	October 21, 1989
52	4	"A Froggy Day in Marlowe Town"	Bob Claver	Laura Levine	October 28, 1989
53	5	"Eviegeist"	Bob Claver	Robert Schechter	November 4, 1989
54	6	"Evie's Driver's License"	Bob Claver	Mike Scully	November 11, 1989
55	7	"Evie Goes for the Gold"	Bob Claver	Alan Moskowitz	November 18, 1989
56	8	"Hair Today, Gone Tomorrow"	Bob Claver	Laura Levine	November 25, 1989
57	9	"Around the World in 80 Minutes"	Bob Claver	Bob Booker	December 2, 1989
58	10	"It's a Cruel World"	Bob Claver	Tommy Thompson	December 9, 1989
59	11	"Evie; Stevie"	Selig Frank	Janice Pieroni & Bruce Teicher	December 16, 1989
60	12	"The Rocks That Couldn't Roll"	Selig Frank	Story by : Julie Thacker & Mike Scully; Teleplay by : Mike Scully	January 27, 1990
61	13	"One in a Million"	Bob Claver	Simon Munter	February 3, 1990
62	14	"Four Men and a Baby"	Scott Baio	Bob Booker	February 10, 1990
63	15	"Evie's Double Trouble"	Bob Claver	Kelly Monteith & Bob Booker	February 17, 1990
Evie is tormented by a commercial jingle for a mouthwash company, while Donna rushes to prepare for her commercial on live TV. Throughout the day, the twins that appear in the ad show up to sing part of the jingle again and again as Evie is discussing her retainer with her friends. Evie is confused as to how they keep showing up, so she and Donna turn to Troy for help, and he concludes that the word "mouth" triggers the jingle, she also complains about her retainer so she takes them out, and puts them back in when they leave for the studio. Troy leaves a message saying that the twins appearances were caused by the material in her retainers. Donna then goes on TV for her commercial, but her nervousness causes the word "mouth" to be spoken and the twins to appear and interrupt her, causing her to rhyme the rest of the ad. Buzz then hires the twins to be part of his new commercials. Guest Stars: Marilyn & Roz Borden as the Buffalo Breath Twins, and Michael Francis Clarke as the Ad Director
64	16	"The Garden of Evie"	Bob Claver	Alan Moskowitz	February 24, 1990
65	17	"Evie's Magic Touch"	Bob Claver	Gail Honigberg	March 3, 1990
66	18	"Cowboy Kyle, Man of Granite"	Scott Baio	Laura Levine	April 28, 1990
67	19	"Evie's Secret Admirer"	Bob Claver	Gail Honigberg	May 5, 1990
68	20	"Evie's Yuppie Love"	Bob Claver	Julie Thacker	May 12, 1990
69	21	"Diamonds Are Evie's Best Friend"	Bob Claver	Laura Levine	May 19, 1990
70	22	"A Kinder, Gentler Mayor"	Bob Claver	Brian Scully	May 26, 1990
71	23	"My Mother the Con"	Bob Claver	Mike Scully	June 2, 1990
72	24	"Goodbye, Mr. Chris"	Bob Claver	Mike Scully	June 9, 1990

=== Season 4 (1990–91) ===
No. overall	No. in season	Title	Directed by	Written by	Original release date
73	1	"New Kid on the Block"	Scott Baio	Mike Scully	October 6, 1990
74	2	"My Little Evie"	Bob Claver	George Yanok	October 13, 1990
75	3	"Forget Your Troubles"	Jeffrey Ganz	Brian Scully	October 20, 1990
76	4	"A Mind Is a Terrible Thing to Read"	Bob Claver	Alan Moskowitz	October 27, 1990
77	5	"Evie's Guardian Angel"	Bob Claver	Bob Booker	November 3, 1990
78	6	"Best Friends"	Scott Baio	Laura Levine	November 10, 1990
79	7	"I Want My Evie TV"	Bob Claver	Bob Booker	November 17, 1990
80	8	"Come Fly with Evie"	Stan Harris	Mike Scully	November 17, 1990
81	9	"Roomies"	Stan Harris	Brian Scully	December 1, 1990
82	10	"Evie's High Anxiety"	Scott Baio	Laura Levine	December 8, 1990
83	11	"Evie's False Alarm"	Selig Frank	Laura Levine	January 19, 1991
84	12	"Marlowe Vice"	Bob Claver	Brian Scully	January 26, 1991
85	13	"Evie's Latin Touch"	Scott Baio	George Yanok	February 2, 1991
86	14	"My Mom, and Why I Love Her"	Bob Claver	Laura Levine	February 9, 1991
87	15	"Heck's Angels"	Bob Claver	Laura Levine	February 16, 1991
88	16	"Would You Buy a Used Car from This Dude?"	Scott Baio	Mike Scully	February 23, 1991
89	17	"Evie Nightingale"	Scott Baio	Laura Levine	March 2, 1991
90	18	"All About Evie"	Selig Frank	Laura Levine	March 9, 1991
91	19	"Mayor Evie"	Renny Temple	Mike Scully	March 16, 1991
92	20	"Stump Your Neighbor"	Renny Temple	Buzz Belmondo & Bill Farley	April 27, 1991
93	21	"Evie's Three Promises"	Selig Frank	Alan Moskowitz	May 4, 1991
94	22	"Too Late for Evie"	Bob Claver	Michael Poryes	May 11, 1991
Evie arrives home late after her midnight curfew, which angers Donna so she grounds her for two weeks and a day. Donna then visits Kyle's apartment, which has many of her belongings which were "borrowed" from Donna. His door refuses to unlock without a card, and Donna can't leave the apartment, leaving Evie worried that she's out late to pay her a lesson. Evie then arrives with the card to save the day, and as revenge to Kyle, they lock him in his apartment without the keycard.
95	23	"Educating Kyle"	Scott Baio	George Yanok	May 18, 1991
96	24	"Evie's Eighteen"	Scott Baio	Bob Booker	May 25, 1991
On the morning before her eighteenth birthday, Evie receives a call from her father, Troy, who informs her that he’s going away on an off-planet trip. Both Evie and her mother, Donna, have been overwhelmed by requests from various people, including Kyle, a senator, a group of Japanese investors, and a fireman. However, Troy unexpectedly appears on Earth to surprise Evie on her birthday. To escape the constant interruptions, Evie freezes time so the family can enjoy a quiet birthday dinner together. As the evening ends and Troy prepares to return home, Donna is accidentally sent back to Antareus, ending the episode on a cliffhanger.

== Opening credits ==
The opening credits for the series incorporated special effects footage from the 1979–1981 series Buck Rogers in the 25th Century. The theme song is a modified version of "Swinging on a Star". Video snippets of parents Donna and Troy show the start of their relationship including the wedding and birth of daughter Evie. Troy's face is continuously obscured, never fully shown. The fictional town of Marlowe is shown to be adjacent to Carmel-by-the-Sea and Monterey, California with a directional traffic sign.

== International airings ==
In France, Out of this World was aired under the name Loin de ce monde (Far From this World) as part of a block called La Une est à vous (Channel One is Yours) from September 10, 1988, until October 12, 1991, then from July to August 1992 on TF1. It was then rebroadcast from November 1994 until November 10, 1996, on M6.

In Germany, Out of this World was aired under the name Mein Vater ist ein Außerirdischer (My Father is an Alien) which aired on RTL Plus in 1989.

In Italy, Out of this World was aired under the name Cose dell'altro mondo (Things from the Other World) on Rai 1 from 1990. This was also the name of a comedy film from 2011.

In Turkey, it appeared under the name Bu Dünyanın Dışından on the channels of TRT and Star TV.

Out of This World was first broadcast in the UK on the ITV network on April 9, 1990, until 1995, and was later rerun on Trouble.

== Critical reception ==
Discussing Out of This World, Roger Fulton stated "like many juvenile US sitcoms, the series was short on laughs and long on moralizing". The book Television Without Pity contained a review of Out of This World that described the show as "quite possibly the worst sitcom ever made-it's a complete failure on every level". The review went on to criticize the show's scripts, acting and production, and unfavorably compared Out of This World to Sabrina the Teenage Witch. The Splitsider website called Out of This World "perhaps the worst sitcom ever, or at least the most '80s sitcom ever".

== Home media ==
A DVD set with 35 episodes from seasons 1 and 2 was released in Germany on November 8, 2011. The 6-disc set has a runtime of 875 minutes, but does not include all episodes due to music rights.

== In other media ==
- In the Universal Studios ride Kongfrontation, the news report that plays during the queue is interrupted by an ad for Out of This World, at which the screen crawl at the bottom of the ad is a civil defense message warning that King Kong is in the vicinity and for civilians to stay indoors and not use public transportation until further notice.
- The show was parodied in the Robot Chicken episode, "Executed by the State". In the parody, Evie (voiced by Kat Dennings) is asked out by a boy who likes her, she uses her powers to stop time and takes a look down his pants in order to check out the size of his penis. After seeing the size of his penis, Evie says "Uhhh, pass." This is followed by canned laughter typical of sitcoms of that era. Evie then walks off with time still frozen.

== Stations ==
As previously mentioned, during the first season, Out of This World aired on NBC's owned-and-operated stations as part of their Prime Time Begins at 7:30 experiment.

City	Station
Atlanta	WAGA-TV 5
Boston	WCVB-TV 5 WFXT 25; WLVI-TV 56
Charlotte	WBTV 3
Charleston, South Carolina	WTAT-TV 24
Charleston, West Virginia	WVAH-TV 23 (until 1989), 11 (from 1989)
Chicago	WMAQ-TV 5 WPWR-TV 50
Cleveland	WUAB 43
Davenport	KWQC-TV 6
Detroit	WXON-TV 20
Durham	WPTF-TV 28
Fairbanks	KTVF 11
Fort Worth	KTVT 11
Grand Rapids	WXMI 17
Greenville	WFXI 8
Hartford	WTIC-TV 61
Houston	KHTV 39
Indianapolis	WXIN 59
Jacksonville	WJXT 4
Los Angeles	KNBC-TV 4 KTLA 5
Miami	WDZL 39
Milwaukee	WVTV 18
Minneapolis	KITN-TV 29
New Orleans	WGNO-TV 26
New York	WNBC-TV 4
Oakland	KTVU 2
Omaha	KPTM 42
Ottumwa	KOIA-TV 15
Paris, Ontario	CIII-TV 6
Philadelphia	WPHL-TV 17
Salt Lake City	KXIV-TV 14
San Juan	WAPA-TV 4
Seattle	KSTW 11
Secaucus	WWOR-TV 9
Sacramento	KRBK-TV 31
Spokane	KAYU-TV 28
St. Louis	KPLR-TV 11
Washington, D.C.	WFTY 50; WRC-TV 4
Wichita	KSAS-TV 24
