= Rosalyn Borden =

American actor and singer (1932–2003)

Rosalyn "Roz" Borden
- Born: Rosalyn Elaine Borden; May 29, 1932; Hartford, Connecticut, US
- Died: January 23, 2003 (aged 70); Modesto, California, US
- Occupations: Actress, singer
- Spouse(s): Alton Morrow (1973–1975, div.); Darrell Shackley (1979–2003, her death)

Rosalyn "Roz" Borden (May 29, 1932 – January 23, 2003) was an American actor and singer, and along with her sister, Marilyn Borden, were known as The Borden Twins. The duo are perhaps best known for their appearance on I Love Lucy playing "Teensy and Weensy" in the episode entitled "Tennessee Bound". Although never anything other than supporting players, the duo have performed in several venues, including gigs on the nightclub circuit, as well as larger events including Rose Bowl. The twins also performed at countless USO shows at home and overseas and have worked with many famous entertainers including: Lucille Ball, Dean Martin, and Jerry Lewis, Andy Williams, Sammy Davis Jr., Jimmy Durante, Bea Arthur, and Bob Newhart.

== Biography ==
=== Early life ===
Marilyn and Rosalyn Borden were born in Hartford, Connecticut, on May 29, 1932, to Harry (1906–1973) and Elizabeth Borden (1909–1995) and would be followed by a younger sister, Barbara, in 1945. Shortly after the birth of Barbara, Harry left the family.

The Borden Twins got into acting with the encouragement of their parents and as children worked with such famous actors including Bill Robinson. At age four, they performed on a local radio show with Ed Begley in their hometown of Hartford. As teenagers, their family moved to Los Angeles. In high school, they started doing network television. In 1951, they caught the eye of Gene Kelly who wanted to get them a part in Singin' in the Rain. They can only be seen as extras in large crowd scenes.

=== Career ===
The Twins would appear on several television shows including The Spike Jones Show and became regular performers on The Jimmy Durante Show. The twins soon began their association with Jimmy Durante that would span seven years, appearing on many of his TV shows and travelling in his nightclub act. Between their work with Durante, the twins played local nightclubs and travelled with the U.S.O. entertaining servicemen in Korea, Japan, and the Philippines.

=== Television ===
While appearing on an episode of The Ed Wynn Show the twins caught the attention of Lucille Ball, who promised them she would find a part for them on I Love Lucy. True to her word, Ball featured the twins in episode 112 entitled "Tennessee Bound" in which they played the sheriff's daughter's 'Teensy' and Weensy,' opposite Tennessee Ernie Ford.

The twins continued work on television and appeared on CHiPs, Maude, and The Ropers. In The 1970s and 1980s the twins worked on the San Francisco based morning show A.M. San Francisco as fitness experts. Also in the 1980s they began work with Bob Newhart in his stage show in Las Vegas and Lake Tahoe.

Roz and Marilyn were last seen together on television on the 1998 "All-Star Tribute to Aaron Spelling." They would continue to appear at Lucy conventions in California and Jamestown, New York, but they had gotten into the Travel business and booked cruise tours on which they would perform.

=== Roz's death ===
Roz had been ill for several years, and the twins moved from the San Francisco Bay area to Modesto, California. On May 29, 2002, the twins celebrated their 70th birthday, but Roz's health soon declined and she died of liver failure on January 23, 2003, at the age of 70. After her sister's death, Marilyn became a volunteer for the local community hospice, a position she retained for the next four years. That May, Marilyn made her first trip without Roz to Jamestown for the annual "Loving Lucy Festival." She would return again in 2005.

== Television ==
- Four Star Revue (Girl in Gondola 1 episode 1952)
- The Colgate Comedy Hour (1952)
- The Spike Jones Show (1954 and 1957)
- The Ed Wynn Show
- The Jimmy Durante Show (1955–1957 regular performer)
- I Love Lucy (episode 112 "Tennessee Bound" January 24, 1955, as Weensy)
- Rhoda .... Rosalyn (1 episode, 1976) only work not done with Marilyn.
- CHiPs .... Dottie Tidwell (1 episode, 1977)
- Maude .... Shirley (1 episode, 1978)
- Apple Pie .... Trudy Laskey (1 episode, 1978)
- The Ropers .... Betty (1 episode, 1979)
- Lottery! .... Dora (1 episode, 1984)
- The Joan Rivers Show .... (1989)
- Out of This World .... Buffalo Breath Twin (1 episode, 1990)
- All-Star Party for Aaron Spelling 1998
