= The Ed Wynn Show =

American TV variety series (1949–1950)

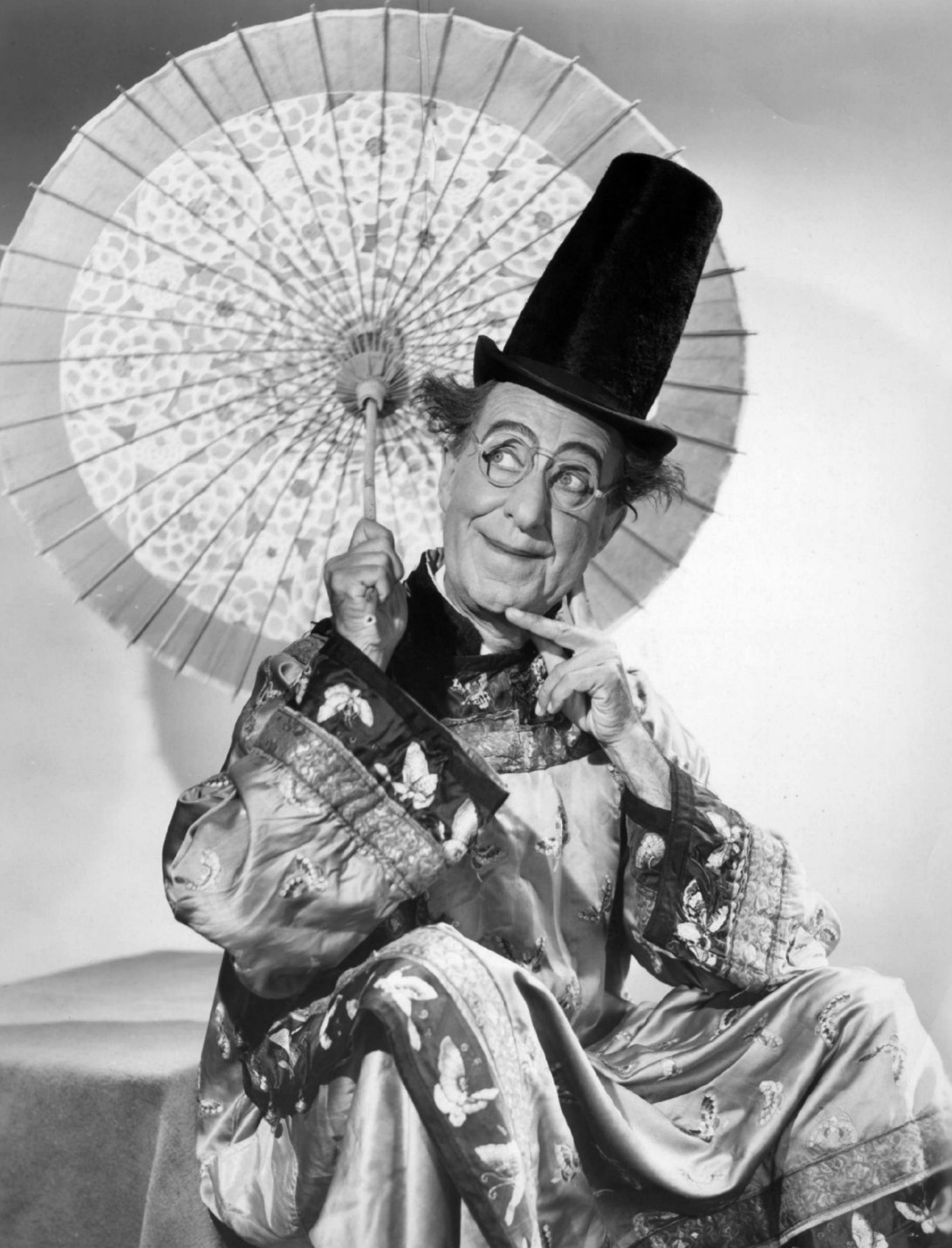
- Also known as: The Camel Comedy Caravan
- Genre: Comedy; Variety
- Created by: Ralph Levy
- Written by: Hy Faber; Hal Kanter; Seaman Jacobs; Leo Solomon; Vin Bogert
- Directed by: Ralph Levy
- Starring: Ed Wynn
- Narrated by: Bob LeMond
- Theme music composer: Lud Gluskin
- Composer: Lud Gluskin
- Country of origin: United States
- Original language: English
- No. of seasons: 1
- No. of episodes: 39

Production
- Producer: Harlan Thompson
- Production locations: Hollywood, California
- Running time: 30 minutes

Original release
- Network: CBS; KTTV (Los Angeles); WCBS-TV (New York)
- Release: September 22, 1949 – July 4, 1950

The Ed Wynn Show is an American variety show originally broadcast from September 22, 1949 to July 4, 1950, on the CBS Television Network. Comedian and former vaudevillian Ed Wynn was the star of the program's 39 episodes, which were the first shows broadcast live from Hollywood, and transmitted via kinescope to New York.

The show included the commercial television debuts of Robert Clary, Dinah Shore, The Three Stooges, Hattie McDaniel, Buster Keaton, Leon Errol, Lucille Ball and Desi Arnaz.

== Production ==
The Ed Wynn Show premiered on September 22, 1949 on CBS. The series starred Ed Wynn, a well-established comedian of stage, vaudeville, film and radio. The series consisted of vaudeville-like skits and music performed by the days' popular artists. Speidel wrist watches was the show's original sponsor. Speidel was soon replaced as sponsor by Camel cigarettes. Under the sponsorship of Camel, the series was known as The Camel Comedy Caravan.

The Ed Wynn Show achieved several "firsts" during its short run. It was the first television series to originate from Hollywood. The series was broadcast live from KTTV in Los Angeles and using the kinescope film process, the films were sent to New York and transmitted on the CBS Eastern and Midwestern stations a week later. The Ed Wynn Show was also one of the first television series to use the kinescope process in an effort to preserve episodes for later distribution. Sometimes after the live broadcast was finished, some re-takes were kinescoped and edited into the film to improve the east coast version.

The series was known for its list of prominent guest stars every week. Some notable guest stars included Eddie "Rochester" Anderson, Frances Langford, The Charlivels, Eve Arden, Celeste Holm, Hattie McDaniel, Buddy Ebsen, Garry Moore, The Modernaires, Mitzi Green, Robert Clary, Gloria Swanson, William Frawley, Joe E. Brown, Charles Laughton, Vera Vague, Carmen Miranda, Cesar Romero, Peggy Lee, Buster Keaton, Dinah Shore, The Three Stooges, Lucille Ball and Desi Arnaz made their television debuts on The Ed Wynn Show.

The series ran one season, ending on July 4, 1950.

The last surviving celebrity to appear on the show was Robert Clary, who died on November 16, 2022. His appearance on the program on January 28, 1950 was mentioned in various news articles upon his passing.

== Broadcast history ==
=== Los Angeles ===
KTTV, Channel 11

- 9/22/1949 - 12/15/1949 Thursdays 9:00-9:30 pm
- 12/24/1949 - 2/18/1950 Saturdays 8:00-8:30 pm
- 2/25/1950 - 4/22/1950 Saturdays 9:00-9:30 pm
- 4/27/1950 - 6/15/1950 Thursdays 7:00-7:30 pm

(Except 6/8/1950 Thursday 9:00-9:30 pm)

=== New York ===
WCBS-TV, Channel 2

- 10/6/1949 - 12/29/1949 Thursdays 9:00-9:30 pm
- 1/7/1950 - 3/25/1950 Saturdays 9:00-9:30 pm
- 4/4/1950 - 7/4/1950 Tuesdays 9:00-9:30 pm

== Awards and nominations ==
Although the series was not popular with television audiences, The Ed Wynn Show did receive a George Foster Peabody Award for Outstanding Entertainment for the year 1949 and a Primetime Emmy Award for Best Live Show for the year 1950.

Year	Award	Category	Result
1949	George Foster Peabody Award	Outstanding Entertainment	Won
1950	Primetime Emmy Award	Best Live Show	Won
