= Doug Gibbs =

American singer-songwriter

- Born: Douglas Burnett Gibbs
- Genres: Soul
- Instruments: Piano, keyboards
- Years active: 1970s
- Label: Oak

Douglas Burnett Gibbs is an American singer, songwriter, record producer and session musician, who had a hit on the Billboard soul chart in 1972 with "I'll Always Have You There". He had also done work with Little Richard, Billy Preston and Chuck Jackson. A song he co-composed with Ralph Johnson has been sampled by Jay-Z for his hit "Song Cry".

== Career ==
Gibbs had various roles on the Ray Ruff produced Christian rock opera album Truth of Truths, which was released on the Oak label in 1971. Also that year Billy Preston's album, I Wrote a Simple Song was released. He was one of the background vocalists.

In 1972, his single "I'll Always Have You There" bw "Cloudy Day" was released on Oak OR-108. Both sides were co-written by himself and Bruce Fisher. The producer was Ernie Freeman. In the September 2, 1972 issue of Billboard Magazine, it was reported that his single was getting heavy airplay in Chicago and San Francisco. On September 9, it had entered the chart at #37. Now at its fifth week in the Billboard charts, the song finally peaked at #25 on October 7, 1972. It entered the Cashbox R&B Top 60 at 45 on September 23. On October 14, it was at #32, just behind "One Life to Live" by The Manhattans. He appeared on Soul Train in an episode that aired on November 11, 1972. Other guests on the show were Friends of Distinction, The Persuaders and actor William Marshall.

He contributed to Chuck Jackson's Through All Times album which was released on ABC in 1973. As well as background vocals, he co-wrote "Through All Times" with Bob Siller. The same year, Genie Brown's album A Woman Alone was released on the Dunhill label. Two of his compositions, "Wrapped In Love" and "You And Me" appeared on the album.

Gibbs contributed heavily to Bobby Glenn's 1976 album Shout It Out which was released on Koala KST-5004 in 1976. In addition to co-producing and co-arranging the album, he composed "Morning Song" and co-composed six others. he also played piano, electric piano, and clavinet on the recordings. Years later, a song from the album "Sounds Like a Love Song", which he and Ralph Johnson wrote, would be sampled by Jay-Z for his hit "Song Cry".

Gibbs is the CEO of Chitty Chitty Music.

== Discography ==
Releases
Act	Title	Label	Year	Format	Notes #
Doug Gibbs	"I'll Always Have You There" / "Cloudy Day"	Oak OR-108	1972	45 RPM single	
Douglas Gibbs Feat. Michael James Hilley	"I Am Here"	Chitty Chitty Music; Dobugi Records (190394911348)	2016	Digital single	

== Television and film ==
Director
Title	Episode	Role	Director	Date	Notes #
Soul Train	Season 2, Episode 10; The Friends of Distinction; The Persuaders, Doug Gibbs	Himself	Don Buccola	1972	
Unsung	Billy Preston	Himself	Anthony Storm	2011	As Douglas Gibbs
Precious		Songwriter "My Good Lovin"	Lee Daniels	2009	As Douglas Gibbs
