= Donnie Brooks =

American pop singer (1936–2007)

- Also known as: Johnny Jordan; Dick Bush; Johnny Faire
- Born: John Dee Abohosh; February 6, 1936
- Origin: Dallas, Texas, U.S.
- Died: February 23, 2007 (aged 71) Panorama City, California
- Genres: Pop, rockabilly, surf rock
- Occupation: Singer
- Labels: Era; Fable; Reprise; Happy Tiger

Donnie Brooks (born John Dee Abohosh; February 6, 1936 – February 23, 2007) was an American pop music singer. Brooks is a member of the Rockabilly Hall of Fame.

== Early life ==
Born in Dallas, Texas, Abohosh moved to Ventura, California in his teens, where he was adopted by his stepfather and took the name John D. Faircloth. He discovered a singing voice at a young age and recorded a few minor hits with several small record labels under the stage names Johnny Jordan, Dick Bush (which sole single "Hollywood Party" was his first for Era), and Johnny Faire, the latter gaining some sales with "Bertha Lou" in early 1959, while a cover version by Clint Miller charted nationally.

== Career ==
Brooks was still without a recording contract in 1958 when he played a set at a El Monte Legion Stadium show, singing two songs that included Ray Charles' hit "What'd I Say". Encouraged by friends Dorsey and Johnny Burnette, he stayed in the music business and in late 1959 he made his first recording using the name Donnie Brooks. His first single, "Li'l Sweetheart", received a mediocre reception, but his March 1960 single, "Mission Bell" on Era Records, became a major hit; it peaked at No. 7 on the Billboard Hot 100 chart. His follow-up single, "Doll House"/"Round Robin" (a double-sided hit single with a color picture sleeve on Era Records), peaked at No. 31 in December 1960. In an interview for a 2006 concert, he performed at Sherman Indian High School in Riverside, California (posted on YouTube), Brooks revealed that he was the voice of the opening theme to the cartoon series George of the Jungle. He also sang the themes to the cartoon series Super Chicken and Tom Slick. In addition to "Mission Bell", Brooks produced recording artists Merrilee Rush ("Angel of the Morning"), Cannibal & the Headhunters ("Land of 1000 Dances"), Len Barry ("1-2-3," "Bristol Stomp", "You Can't Sit Down"), and Jewel Akens ("The Birds and the Bees"). Brooks also produced "30 Years of Rock and Roll", a touring live show featuring all of the above-mentioned performers along with Dennis Yost of the Classics IV, Larry Raspberry of the Gentrys, The Fireballs, and Tiny Tim.

In 1971, Brooks played the role of Christ in the rock opera Truth of Truths for Oak Records. Brooks has also toured with fellow performers from the early rock and roll era in various oldies revival shows.

In 2003, Brooks was inducted into the Rockabilly Hall of Fame.

== Death ==
Brooks died on February 23, 2007, in Panorama City, California.

There was a memorial service and rockabilly show in his honor on Monday, March 26, 2007, at the Elks Lodge in Burbank, California.

== Discography ==
=== Albums ===
Year	Album	Record Label
1961	The Happiest	Era

=== Singles ===
Year	Title	Peak chart positions	Record Label	B-side	Album
Year	Title	US Pop	Record Label	B-side	Album
1959	"If You're Lookin'"	—	Era	"Li'l Sweetheart"	
1959	"White Orchid"	—	Era	"Sway and Move With the Beat"	
1960	"The Devil Ain't a Man"	—	Era	"How Long"	The Happiest
1960	"Mission Bell"	7	Era	"Do It for Me"	The Happiest
1960	"Doll House"	31	Era	"Round Robin" (BB #115)	The Happiest
1961	"Memphis"	90	Era	"That's Why"	The Happiest
1961	"All I Can Give"	—	Era	"Wishbone"	The Happiest
1961	"Boomerang"	—	Era	"How Long"	
1961	"Up to My Ears (In Tears)"	—	Era	"Sweet Lorraine"	
1961	"Your Little Boy's Come Home"	—	Era	"Goodnight Judy"	
1962	"My Favorite Kind of Face"	—	Era	"He Stole Flo"	
1962	"Oh! You Beautiful Doll"	—	Era	"Just a Bystander"	
1962	"It's Not That Easy"	—	Era	"Cries My Heart"	
1964	"Girl Machine"	—	Reprise	"Gone"	
1964	"Can't Help Lovin' You"	—	Reprise	"Pickin' up the Pieces"	
1965	"If I Never Get to Love You"	—	Reprise	"Hey, Little Girl"	
1966	"I Call Your Name"	—	Challenge	"Be Fair"	
1966	"Pink Carousel"	—	Challenge	"Minstrel Man"	
1968	"Blue Soldier"	—	Era	"Love Is Funny That Way"	
1970	"Abracadabra"	—	Happy Tiger	"I Know You as a Woman"	
1970	"Hush"	—	Happy Tiger	"I Know You as a Woman"	
1970	"My God and I"	—	Happy Tiger	"Pink Carousel"	
