= Five Flights Up =

Five Flights Up was an American five-person R&B ensemble including Geneva Crawford, Blanton McFarlin, Carlnetta Kelly, Charles Termell and J.B. Bingham. They had a hit in 1970 with the song "Do What You Wanna Do", which was written by J.B. Bingham, arranged by Ernie Freeman, and produced by John Florez. The song, released on T-A Records, hit #37 on the Hot 100 but top 10 in Chicago, #9 on WCFL and #6 on WLS. In Canada, the song reached #64 on the national charts and #22 on Toronto's CHUM Chart. A follow-up single, "After the Feeling Is Gone," peaked at #89 on the Billboard pop chart.

== Discography ==
Singles
Title	Label	Year	Notes #
"Do What You Wanna Do" / "Black Cat"	T-A 202	1970	
"After The Feeling Is Gone" / "Where Are You Going, Girl?"	T-A 207	1970	
"Like Monday Follows Sunday" / "California Girl"	T-A 2012	1971	
"Day Before Yesterday" / "There's Nothing Wrong (With Loving A Stranger)"	Oak OR-113	1973	
