= Montreux '77 (Count Basie album) =

Live album by Count Basie
- Released: 1977
- Recorded: July 15, 1977
- Genre: Jazz
- Length: 42:24
- Label: Pablo
- Producer: Norman Granz

Count Basie chronology
Prime Time (1976)	Montreux '77 (1977)	Live in Japan '78 (1978)

Professional ratings
Review scores
Source	Rating
Allmusic	4/5 stars
The Penguin Guide to Jazz Recordings	3/4 stars

Montreux '77 is an album by Count Basie and his orchestra, recorded at the 1977 Montreux Jazz Festival.

== Track listing ==
1. "The Heat's On" (Sammy Nestico) – 3:39
2. "Freckle Face" (Nestico) – 6:04
3. "Splanky" (Neal Hefti) – 4:34
4. "The More I See You" (Mack Gordon, Harry Warren) – 3:41
5. "A Night in Tunisia" (Dizzy Gillespie, Frank Paparelli) – 4:53
6. "Hittin' 12" (Harrison) – 2:23
7. "Bag of Dreams" (Jimmy Forrest) – 6:14
8. "Things Ain't What They Used to Be" (Mercer Ellington, Ted Persons) – 4:14
9. "I Needs to Be Bee'd With" (Quincy Jones) – 5:07
10. "Li'l Darlin'" (Hefti) – 4:44
11. "Jumpin' at the Woodside" (Count Basie, Jon Hendricks) – 3:50
12. "One O'Clock Jump" (Basie) – 3:28

== Personnel ==
The Count Basie Orchestra

- Count Basie - piano
- Al Grey - trombone
- Dennis Wilson - trombone
- Mel Wanzo - trombone
- Bill Hughes - trombone
- Waymon Reed - trumpet
- Lin Biviano - trumpet
- Sonny Cohn - trumpet
- Bobby Mitchell - trumpet
- Jimmy Forrest - tenor saxophone
- Eric Dixon - tenor saxophone
- Danny Turner - saxophone
- Bobby Plater - alto saxophone
- Charlie Fowlkes - baritone saxophone
- Freddie Green - guitar
- John Duke - double bass
- Butch Miles - drums
