= David Chackler =

American music and film executive (1945–2024)

- Born: April 24, 1945; Philadelphia, U.S.
- Died: April 27, 2024 (aged 79); Moorestown, New Jersey, U.S.
- Occupation: Media executive

David Saul Chackler (April 24, 1945 – April 27, 2024) was an American music and film executive. He was best known for launching the careers of several artists, including Queen, Stevie Nicks, Lindsey Buckingham, and 2 Live Crew.

== Early life ==
David Saul Chackler was born in Philadelphia on April 24, 1945. He graduated from Northeast High School and attended Penn State University.

== Career ==
=== Music ===
Chackler's first work was with Cameo-Parkway Records. Mercury Records offered him a promotional position locally and within the first year moved him to national promotion director. During his tenure at Mercury, he also worked with Philips Smash and Fontana Records, where he influenced the careers of artists including: Frankie Valli & the Four Seasons, Spanky and Our Gang, Roger Miller, and Jerry Butler.

Soon after his first year at Mercury, Chackler was in Chicago, working as Mercury’s Vice President of National Promotion. In 1968, Chess Records named Chackler vice president of National promotion. This provided him the opportunity to work with artists, including : Howling Wolf, Muddy Waters, Chuck Berry and Minnie Riperton (and Rotary Connection).

He also tapped into his Philadelphia roots and was instrumental in bringing the production team of Gamble-Huff, to Chess with their Neptune Records label, where The O'Jays had their first hit, "One Night Affair." Chackler then moved from Chess to White Whale Records, in Los Angeles, working with The Turtles, Renee and Renee, and then on to Polydor/Polygram Records, where he became vice president of promotion and later vice president of west coast operations.

By mid 1972, Chackler had worked for Mercury Records, Happy Tiger Records, Ray Ruff's label Oak Records and Jimmy Miller Productions in various roles.

In 1972, Chackler created his own production and publishing company, Chalice Productions (ABC Records/Dona Marta Music) with partner Lee Lasseff. Their first venture was the chart topping single, "Billy Don’t be a Hero". During this period, while working with producer Keith Olsen, he was introduced to an unknown duo known then as Buckingham-Nicks. Chackler recognized immediately their potential and signed them to the independent label he and Lasseff had at that time, Anthem Records, which was distributed through Polydor Records. The debut album, Buckingham Nicks was released in September 1973. Olsen was later producing and engineering a Fleetwood Mac record, at Sound City Studios when together he and Chackler introduced the duo to Mick Fleetwood. The introduction resulted in Stevie and Lindsey becoming permanent members of Fleetwood Mac. "Fleetwood Mac" and "Rumours" emerged. These albums remain as two of the largest and fastest-selling records of all time.

With the music industry, Chackler had become saturated in the British Invasion, realizing the opportunity in extending music across the globe. While working in Europe, he entered into a venture with Trident Studios in London which achieved the discovery of Freddie Mercury and Queen, bringing their new sound to audiences in the United States.

During this period, Chackler delved further into the UK music scene by setting up a joint venture publishing arrangement with Bryan Morrison and Bryan Morrison Music. This entity was Front Wheel Music and held the North American rights for English Punk Band, The Jam (led by Paul Weller), Robin Gibb, and many others. The Jam's initial release came in 1977 through Polydor Records.

In the early 1980s, after securing distribution agreements from Capitol and CBS Records, Chackler launched WMOT Records through a CBS Deal. CBS launched the single,"Double Dutch Bus" by Frankie Smith. He also had a distribution agreement with Capitol records for Chalice, where he worked with artists including, Steven Fromholz (from the redneck rock world in Austin, TX). The book, entitled "The Improbable Rise of Redneck Rock", first published in 1974, includes Chackler's (Chalice Records) influence.

Chackler soon joined forces with Joe Isgro, and was named president of the CBS Label, Private I, a record company distributed through Epic Records. While there, he was instrumental in acts that included Matthew Wilder and The Staple Singers.

In 1986, Chackler moved to Miami, joining forces with Luther Campbell, where he helped create the ground-breaking rap label, Luke Skywalker, which later became Luke Records. The label achieved multi-platinum status with the group, 2 Live Crew. While at Luke/Atlantic, Chackler also executive-produced two video releases, the first in conjunction with "Wayne’s World" director, Penelope Spheeris, which was titled "Rap's Most Wanted". The second was titled, "Banned in the USA".

"Me So Horny" which was featured on 2 Live Crew’s album, "As Nasty As They Wanna Be" was a track that stirred attention when Tipper Gore and the Record Industry Association of America fought to censor music. The first of now hundreds of thousands of records labeled with the Parental Advisory Sticker, the album project made headlines in the press while the artists defended their lyrics as freedom of expression, all the way to the US Supreme Court.

Moreover, the track, "As Nasty as They Wanna Be : The Uncensored Story of Luther Campbell of the 2 Live Crew" became one of hip-hop’s first tell-all novels. Chackler’s influence on this group and the genre itself is referenced throughout the 244 pages.

In early 1990s, Chacker moved back to Los Angeles and became president and chief operating officer of Avenue Records (Rhino) – Warner Bros., and the label’s roster expanded to include Pop, Urban, R&B, Dance, Jazz and World Music, and Hip Hop. The American funk band, War, was one of those on this roster, and within 18 months of working with Avenue, War’s album, "Best of War and More", had certified gold status. Other titles under this label included "Runnin Away", performed by artist Lillie McCloud, known in the industry only as Nicole. "Runnin Away" held on Billboard Magazine’s dance charts for more than four months.

Chackler began International Entertainment Group, which was the home of two independent niche companies, Slipdisc Records (a division of Mercury Records) and nuGroove, which was distributed by Sony/RED. At the end of the 20th century, nuGroove was one of the main labels in the Smooth Jazz genre. Artists included Michael Lington, who today is considered one of the leaders in the Smooth Jazz industry. Down to the Bone’s debut album, "From Manhattan to Staten" became one of the top five records of the year-end charts for Smooth Jazz in 1997 and remains one of the biggest selling records of all time in the genre. In 1997, nuGroove was nominated as "Best Label," by Radio & Records.

In the Spring of 1998, Chackler divested his interests in nuGroove so that he could focus solely on building Slipdisc. While aligned with Mercury, Slipdisc became one of the world’s premier rock labels – and continues to be known world-wide for its Industrial Rock brand.

The new century marked Chackler’s return to the East Coast. Moving his company back to his roots in Philadelphia, Chackler transitioned International Entertainment Group into a new venture, Zephyr Media Group. Zephyr combined what was familiar in traditional music business with the power and reach of the internet.

Rhythm and Groove Records was formed in 2001 as the initial step by David Chackler. Almost immediately, it achieved much success in the "Rare Request Series of Compilations". This includes albums by Fishbelly Black, XL, and Daryl Hall.

In 2004, Chackler sold the rhythm and groove label to his partners and opened 215 Records. Hits with this label included, "Cream" by Soul Ballet. Not long after launching 215, Chackler rejuvenated, he entered into a distribution agreement with Sony/RED, which was one of the industry distributors in the United States at that time. The first release, "Slammin'" by Jay Soto, soared to number 1 on the Radio & Record’s Smooth Jazz Charts and remained there for 40 weeks.

Chackler then signed Urban music legend Bob Baldwin to the label – and in a move that was a surprise to the industry, he re-signed Michael Lington to the label. nuGroove artists rose with these artists and others including Darren Rahn’s single, "Talk of the Town," which was number one on the charts for three weeks in 2009.

While busy with the reactivation of nuGroove, Chackler founded Digital Marketing Group (DMG). DMG’s mission was to maximize exposure for artists and labels by making music available direct to consumers, and provide marketing tools to labels and artists, through online and other new media marketing ideas. Using internet radio, social media sites, podcasting, fan sites, and other online groups, DMG represented clients including Time Life, Concord Music Group, EMI Digital, and Pangea Entertainment.

Chackler continued in the industry, known behind the scenes for consulting, distribution, and production. He worked with artists from many different genres, including keyboardist Alan Hewitt, member Moody Blues, Jim Peterik, the founder of Survivor and Ides of March and grammy-winning rock legend, and the new sensation of #imEnough, The Mrs.

=== Film ===
In the early to mid-eighties while running Private I, Chackler began creating music for film. This began when Gary Lemel, who at the time was head of music for Columbia Pictures, asked Chackler to help him create new music for several features they were developing at the time. Private I\Epic was developed and magic was born.

Chackler first met film director Tom Holland (his partner) when Lemel brought him in to develop the music and Soundtrack for what became the Fright Night movie. Chackler also served as the music supervisor for other films with Holland, including : Child's Play and Fatal Beauty, where LeVert's, "Casanova" was originally featured.

Chackler's extensive ear for music and talent provided the natural progression to creating Sounds of Film, Ltd. which continues to provide music supervision and soundtrack services today. His work has provided services for over 50 film projects and/or motion pictures over the span of the last 30 years. Projects include the "Police Academy" series, Original Gangstas, Tales from the Crypt, A Nightmare on Elm Street 3: Dream Warriors and A Nightmare on Elm Street 4: The Dream Master.

During his tenure in Miami, Chackler met the owners of Greenwich Studios, located there. Greenwich possessed a huge sound stage where the original "Flipper", was filmed. The studio was under-utilized during that period, and Chackler was brought in to apply his experience, to rebuild the business. He served as chief operating officer for Greenwich Films, where he developed and provided executive production services, as well as music supervision, on four feature films, including: South Beach, All American Murder. He also created a joint venture publishing opportunity with Sony Music, with a focus on highlighting all film music.

Back in Los Angeles, Chackler served as co-producer on other films, including John Carpenter's Village of the Damned and Original Gangstas".

Chackler received his first Independent Spirit Award nomination in the category of "Best Film Music" by Independent Feature Project/West for his work in Hang'n with the Homeboys.

In 2009, Chackler and filmmaker Tom Holland co-founded the production company Dead Rabbit Films.

== Personal life ==
Chackler resided in Moorestown, New Jersey. He had a son, a daughter, and five grandchildren.

Chackler was featured in several books such as Hit Men, As Nasty as they Wanna Be, The Improbable Rise of Redneck Rock, and Stevie Nicks' Visions, Dreams & Rumors.

== Death ==
On April 27, 2024, at the age of 79, Chackler died at his home in Moorestown, New Jersey. He was buried at Roosevelt Cemetery in Trevose, Pennsylvania, where a service was held on May 3. In lieu of flowers, it was requested that mourners donate to the Wounded Warrior Project, his favorite charity.
