= Jim Backus =

American actor (1913–1989)

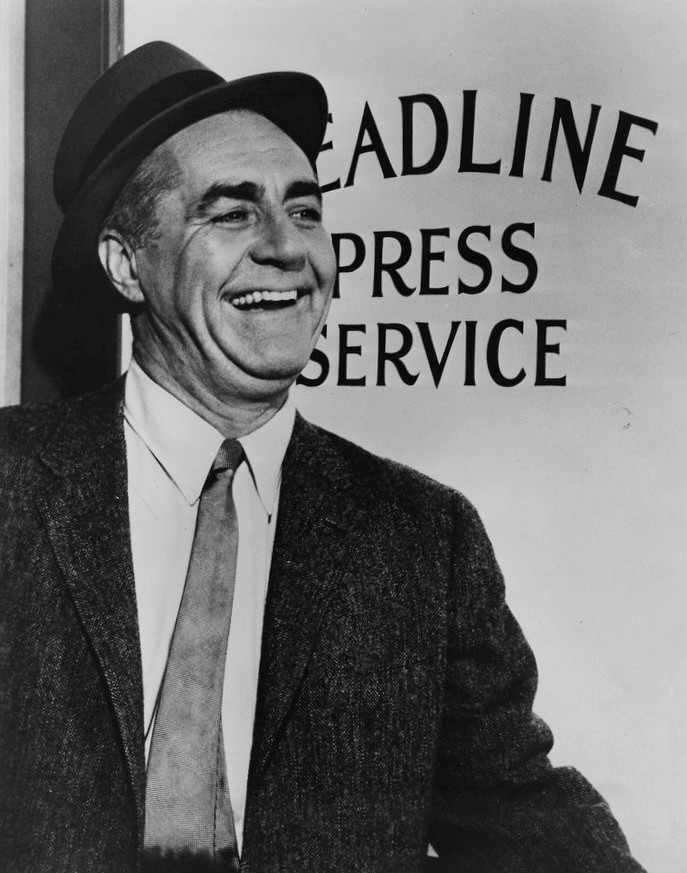
- Publicity still of Backus for The Jim Backus Show, 1962
- Born: James Gilmore Backus; February 25, 1913; Cleveland, Ohio, U.S.
- Died: July 3, 1989 (aged 76); Los Angeles, California, U.S.
- Occupation: Actor
- Years active: 1948–1984
- Known for: Gilligan's Island; Rebel Without a Cause; Mr. Magoo
- Spouses: Betty Kean (m. 1939; div. 1942) Henny Backus (m. 1943)
- Awards: Hollywood Walk of Fame

James Gilmore Backus (February 25, 1913 – July 3, 1989) was an American actor. Among his most famous roles were Thurston Howell III on the 1960s sitcom Gilligan's Island, the father of James Dean's character in Rebel Without a Cause, the voice of the near-sighted cartoon character Mr. Magoo, the rich Hubert Updike III on the radio version of The Alan Young Show, and Joan Davis' character's husband (a domestic court judge) on TV's I Married Joan. He also starred in his own show of one season, The Jim Backus Show, also known as Hot Off the Wire.

An avid golfer, Backus made the 36-hole cut at the 1964 Bing Crosby Pro-Am tournament. He was inducted to the Hollywood Walk of Fame in 1960.

== Early life ==
Backus was born February 25, 1913, in Cleveland, Ohio, and raised in Bratenahl, Ohio, an East Side suburb of Cleveland located on the Lake Erie shore, surrounded by the city on three sides. He was the only son of Russell Gould Backus (1880–1954) and Daisy Taylor (née Gilmore) Backus (1889–1959). His older sister was Katherine Jane Backus. He attended Shaw High School in East Cleveland, Ohio and graduated from University School in Shaker Heights, Ohio.

== Career ==
=== Acting ===
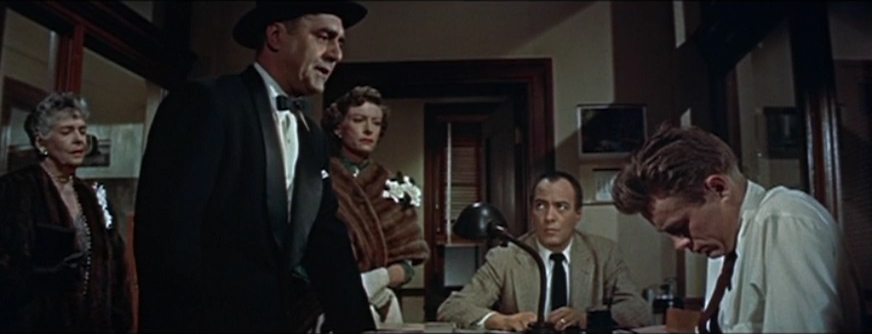
Virginia Brissac, Backus, Ann Doran, Edward Platt, and James Dean in Rebel Without a Cause

Backus was acting on radio as early as 1940, playing the role of millionaire aviator Dexter Hayes on Society Girl on CBS. He had an extensive career and worked steadily in Hollywood over five decades, often portraying characters with an "upper-crust", New England-like air, much like his best-known role, Thurston Howell III on Gilligan's Island. He appeared in (and narrated) A Dangerous Profession (1949); Deadline – U.S.A. (1952) with Humphrey Bogart; Pat and Mike (1952) with Spencer Tracy and Katharine Hepburn; Rebel Without a Cause (1955); The Pied Piper of Hamelin (1957); and It's a Mad, Mad, Mad, Mad World (1963). He also made television appearances on The Beverly Hillbillies (1962).

Backus was the voice of the nearsighted cartoon character Mr. Magoo. Years later, when Backus was a frequent talk show guest, he would recount the time Marilyn Monroe urgently beckoned him into her dressing room. Henny Backus, Jim's wife, recalled the story: "Jim was in the 1952 film Don't Bother to Knock, with Marilyn Monroe. He came home one night during the filming and told me that Miss Monroe in her most seductive breathy voice asked him to meet her in her dressing room. His curiosity got the better of him and he went. Once there, she exclaimed like an excited child, 'Do Mr. Magoo!' And Jim did."

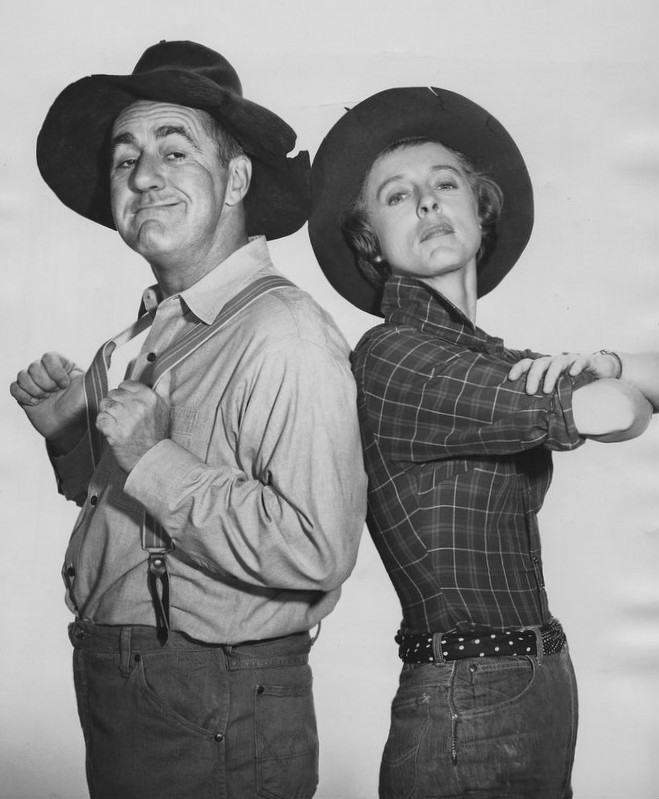
Backus in a guest appearance on The Beverly Hillbillies, with Nancy Kulp (1963)

He frequently could be heard on primetime radio programs in the postwar era, including The Jack Benny Program, and he portrayed egotistical snob Hubert Updike III on The Alan Young Show on the NBC Radio Network, as well as the similarly vain Hartley Benson on The Mel Blanc Show on the CBS Radio Network. He starred on the short-lived variety program The Jim Backus Show on the ABC Radio Network in 1957 and 1958, when that network changed its name to the American Broadcasting Network (ABN) and tried out a "Live and Lively" format of "Big Time Radio" with orchestras and audiences. Backus costarred on the TV comedy show I Married Joan from 1952 to 1955, portraying the husband of Joan Davis.

Backus appeared as Thurston Howell III on Gilligan's Island for all three seasons of its run, 1964 to 1967, and later in reunion TV films, Rescue from Gilligan's Island (1978), The Castaways on Gilligan's Island (1979), and The Harlem Globetrotters on Gilligan's Island (1981). By the third and final film in 1981, Backus was suffering from Parkinson's disease and his participation was limited to a cameo appearance. He also voiced the character in two cartoon versions of the series, The New Adventures of Gilligan from 1974 to 1977 and Gilligan's Planet from 1982 to 1983.

Backus also returned as the voice of Mr. Magoo in various revivals between 1964 and 1977, which included The Famous Adventures of Mr. Magoo and What's New, Mr. Magoo?. In stark contrast to his usual affluent characters, he guest-starred on The Brady Bunch in 1971 as an old gold prospector, a role he also played on a Gilligan's Island episode. He also had a role in the final season episode "The Hustler" (1974) in which he plays Mike's boss, Mr. Matthews.

Backus played Reverend Sims in the 1975 "Brides and Grooms" episode of Gunsmoke. He also appeared in "Never Con a Killer" (1977), the pilot for the ABC crime drama The Feather and Father Gang. In 1981, he and his wife Henny appeared in an episode of The Love Boat. In it, he had one line in his four scenes.

=== Writing and recording ===
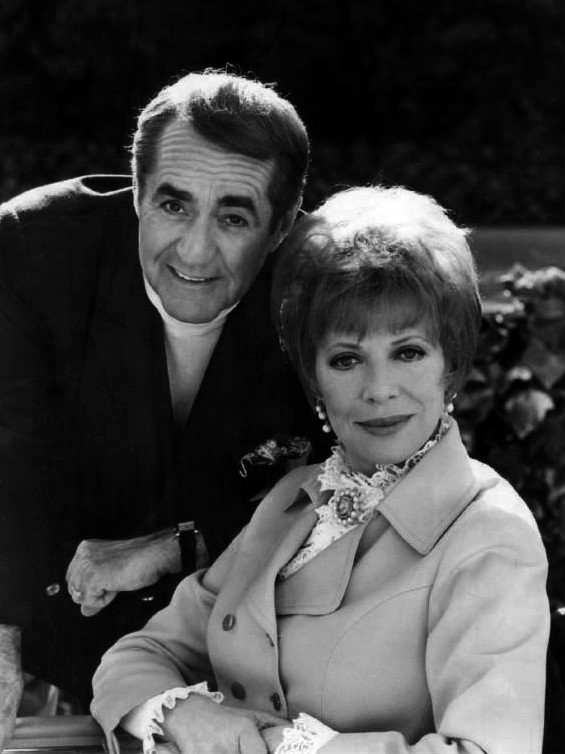
Backus and his wife, Henny (née Kaye), 1969

Backus and his second wife, Henny Backus, co-wrote several humorous books, including: ...Only When I Laugh, his autobiography, Backus Strikes Back, a memoir, Forgive Us Our Digressions: An Autobiography, and What Are You Doing After the Orgy? — the title taken from a line Backus spoke in the 1965 film John Goldfarb, Please Come Home! He also co-wrote the 1971 family film Mooch Goes to Hollywood, about a dog that tries to become a movie star.

In 1958, he made novelty 45 rpm record singles, co-written by Buddy Kaye, "Delicious" (similar to Kaye and T. C. Jones's 1956 "Champagne Cocktails") and "Cave Man". In 1959, he made novelty 45 rpm record singles, co-written by Irving Taylor, "I Was A Teenage Reindeer" and "The Office Party".

In 1974, a full-length comedy LP album was released on the Doré label under the title The Dirty Old Man, with sketches written by Bob Hudson and Ron Landry, who also appear on the album, along with voice-actress Jane Webb. Backus also played the voice of God in the recording of Truth of Truths, a 1971 rock opera based on the Bible.

=== Television commercials ===
Backus acted in several television commercials. As Mr. Magoo, he also helped advertise the General Electric line of products over the years. In Bowl 'Em Over with GE Bulbs (1963), a Cinécraft Productions sales training film made for the GE Large Lamp Division, Backus introduces the Mr. Magoo Soft White light bulb TV advertising campaign for Fall 1963. For the first time, General Electric commercials would be shown in color on prime-time TV shows, including the Tonight Show with Johnny Carson. He was also spokesman for La-Z-Boy furniture during the 1970s. An example commercial can be heard during Zero Hour radio program episode entitled “Lost In Time” broadcast in 1974.

In the late 1980s, he was reunited with former co-star Natalie Schafer in an advertisement for Orville Redenbacher's popcorn. They reprised their roles from Gilligan's Island, but instead of still being shipwrecked, the setting was a luxurious study or den. This would be the final TV appearance for both actors, who were in frail health. They also both appeared on Fox's short lived talk show The Late Show with Ross Shafer, along with the rest of the cast of Gilligan's Island, in 1988.

== Death ==
On July 3, 1989, Backus died in Los Angeles from complications of pneumonia after suffering from Parkinson's disease for many years.

== Discography ==
- Magoo in Hi-Fi (RCA Victor, 1957) as Mr. Magoo
- Delicious! (Jubilee, 1958)
- Cave Man (Jubilee, 1958)
- Truth of Truths (Oak, 1971) as God
- The Dirty Old Man (Doré, 1974)
- Mr. Magoo's A Christmas Carol (Wonderwall, 1979) as Mr. Magoo

== Filmography ==
=== Film ===
Year	Title	Role	Notes
1948	A-Lad-In His Lamp	Genie	Short, Voice, Uncredited
1948	Where Will You Hide?	Narrator	Short, Voice
1949	One Last Fling	Howard Pritchard	
1949	Easy Living	Dr. Franklin	
1949	Ragtime Bear	Mr. Magoo	Short, Voice, Uncredited
1949	Father Was a Fullback	Professor Sullivan	
1949	The Great Lover	Higgins	
1949	A Dangerous Profession	Police Lt. Nick Ferrone / Narrator	
1950	Spellbound Hound	Mr. Magoo	Short, Voice, Uncredited
1950	Ma and Pa Kettle Go to Town	Joseph 'Little Joe' Rogers	
1950	Customs Agent	Shanghai Chief Agent Thomas Jacoby	
1950	The Miner's Daughter	John Harvard	Short, Voice, Uncredited
1950	Trouble Indemnity	Mr. Magoo	Short, Voice
1950	The Killer That Stalked New York	Willie Dennis	Uncredited
1950	Emergency Wedding	Ed Hamley	
1950	Bungled Bungalow	Mr. Magoo	Short, Voice
1951	M	The Mayor	
1951	Barefaced Flatfoot	Mr. Magoo	Short, Voice, Uncredited
1951	Bright Victory	Bill Grayson	
1951	Half Angel	Michael Hogan	
1951	Plutopia	Milton	Short, Voice, Uncredited
1951	Hollywood Story	Mitch Davis	
1951	His Kind of Woman	Myron Winton	
1951	Iron Man	Max Watkins	
1951	Fuddy Duddy Buddy	Mr. Magoo	Short, Voice, Uncredited
1951	The Man with a Cloak	Flaherty	
1951	I'll See You in My Dreams	Sam Harris	
1951	Grizzly Golfer	Mr. Magoo	Short, Voice
1951	I Want You	Harvey Landrum	
1952	Here Come the Nelsons	Joe Randolph	
1952	Sloppy Jalopy	Mr. Magoo	Short, Voice
1952	Deadline – U.S.A.	Jim Cleary	
1952	The Dog Snatcher	Mr. Magoo	Short, Voice
1952	Pat and Mike	Charles Barry	
1952	Don't Bother to Knock	Peter Jones	
1952	Pink and Blue Blues	Mr. Magoo	Short, Voice
1952	The Rose Bowl Story	Michael 'Iron Mike' Burke	
1952	Pete Hothead	Floorwalker	Short, Voice, Uncredited
1952	Hotsy Footsy	Mr. Magoo	Short, Voice
1952	Captains Outrageous	Mr. Magoo	Short, Voice
1952	Above and Beyond	Gen. Curtis E. LeMay	
1952	Androcles and the Lion	Centurion	
1953	Angel Face	District Attorney Judson	
1953	I Love Melvin	Mergo	
1953	Safety Magoo	Mr. Magoo	Short, Voice
1953	Magoo's Masterpiece	Mr. Magoo	Short, Voice
1953	Magoo Slept Here	Mr. Magoo	Short, Voice
1953	Geraldine	Jason Ambrose	
1954	Magoo Goes Skiing	Mr. Magoo	Short, Voice
1954	Kangaroo Courting	Mr. Magoo	Short, Voice
1954	Four Wheels, No Brakes	Television Quizmaster / New Cat Salesman	Short, Voice, Uncredited
1954	Deep in My Heart	Ben Judson	
1954	Destination Magoo	Mr. Magoo	Short, Voice
1954	Look Who's Driving	Charlie	Short, Voice, Uncredited
1955	When Magoo Flew	Mr. Magoo	Short, Voice
1955	Magoo's Check Up	Mr. Magoo	Short, Voice
1955	Magoo Express	Mr. Magoo	Short, Voice
1955	Madcap Magoo	Mr. Magoo	Short, Voice
1955	Francis in the Navy	Cmdr. E.T. Hutch	
1955	Stage Door Magoo	Mr. Magoo	Short, Voice
1955	Rebel Without a Cause	Frank Stark	
1955	Magoo Makes News	Mr. Magoo	Short, Voice
1955	The Square Jungle	Pat Quaid	
1956	Meet Me in Las Vegas	Tom Culdane	
1956	Magoo's Canine Mutiny	Mr. Magoo	Short, Voice
1956	Magoo Goes West	Mr. Magoo	Short, Voice
1956	Calling Dr. Magoo	Mr. Magoo	Short, Voice
1956	The Naked Hills	Willis Haver	
1956	Magoo Beats the Heat	Mr. Magoo	Short, Voice
1956	Magoo's Puddle Jumper	Mr. Magoo	Short, Voice
1956	Trailblazer Magoo	Mr. Magoo	Short, Voice
1956	Magoo's Problem Child	Mr. Magoo	Short, Voice
1956	The Opposite Sex	Psychiatrist	
1956	The Girl He Left Behind	Sgt. Hanna	
1956	You Can't Run Away from It	Danker	
1956	Meet Mother Magoo	Mr. Magoo	Short, Voice
1956	The Great Man	Nick Cellantano	
1957	Top Secret Affair	Col. Homer W. Gooch	
1957	Magoo Goes Overboard	Mr. Magoo	Short, Voice
1957	Matador Magoo	Mr. Magoo	Short, Voice
1957	Magoo Breaks Par	Mr. Magoo	Short, Voice
1957	Magoo's Glorious Fourth	Mr. Magoo	Short, Voice
1957	Man of a Thousand Faces	Clarence Locan	
1957	Magoo's Masquerade	Mr. Magoo	Short, Voice
1957	Magoo Saves the Bank	Mr. Magoo	Short, Voice
1957	Rock Hound Magoo	Mr. Magoo	Short, Voice
1957	Eighteen and Anxious	Harvey Graham	
1957	Magoo's Moose Hunt	Mr. Magoo	Short, Voice
1957	Magoo's Private War	Mr. Magoo	Short, Voice
1958	Magoo's Young Manhood	Mr. Magoo	Short, Voice
1958	Scoutmaster Magoo	Mr. Magoo	Short, Voice
1958	The Explosive Mr. Magoo	Mr. Magoo	Short, Voice
1958	The High Cost of Loving	Paul Mason	
1958	Magoo's Three-Point Landing	Mr. Magoo / Air Traffic Controller	Short, Voice
1958	Magoo's Cruise	Mr. Magoo	Short, Voice
1958	Love Comes to Magoo	Mr. Magoo	Short, Voice
1958	Gumshoe Magoo	Mr. Magoo	Short, Voice
1958	Macabre	Police Chief Jim Tyloe	
1959	Bwana Magoo	Mr. Magoo	Short, Voice
1959	The Untouchables	Norbit, the accountant	
1959	Magoo's Homecoming	Mr. Magoo	Short, Voice
1959	Merry Minstrel Magoo	Mr. Magoo	Short, Voice
1959	Magoo's Lodge Brother	Mr. Magoo	Short, Voice
1959	Ask Any Girl	Maxwell	
1959	The Wild and the Innocent	Mr. Forbes	
1959	Terror Faces Magoo	Mr. Magoo	Short, Voice
1959	A Private's Affair	Jim Gordon	
1959	The Big Operator	Cliff Heldon	
1959	1001 Arabian Nights	Uncle Abdul Azziz Magoo	Voice
1960	Ice Palace	Dave Husack	
1960	Magoo Meets Frankenstein	Mr. Magoo	Short, Voice
1960	Magoo Meets McBoing Boing	Mr. Magoo	Short, Voice
1960	I Was a Teenage Magoo	Mr. Magoo	Short, Voice
1960	Inside Magoo	Mr. Magoo / Himself	Short, Voice, Cancer awareness short produced by the American Cancer Society
1961	The Errand Boy	Mr. Arbutt	Voice, Uncredited
1962	The Horizontal Lieutenant	Cmdr. Jeremiah Hammerslag	
1962	Boys' Night Out	Peter Bowers	
1962	Zotz!	Horatio Kellgore	
1962	The Wonderful World of the Brothers Grimm	The King	('The Dancing Princess')
1963	A Child Is Waiting	Hot Dog vendor	Uncredited
1963	Operation Bikini	Bosun's Mate Ed Fennelly	
1963	My Six Loves	Sheriff	
1963	Critic's Choice	Dr. William Von Hagedorn	
1963	Johnny Cool	Louis Murphy	
1963	It's a Mad, Mad, Mad, Mad World	Tyler Fitzgerald	
1963	Sunday in New York	Chief Pilot Drysdale	
1963	The Wheeler Dealers	Bullard Bear	
1964	Advance to the Rear	Gen. Willoughby	
1965	Mr. Magoo in Sherwood Forest	Mr. Magoo	Voice
1965	Mr. Magoo's Noah's Ark	Mr. Magoo, Mr.Magoo as Noah	Voice
1965	John Goldfarb, Please Come Home!	Miles Whitepaper	
1965	Fluffy	Sergeant	
1965	Billie	Howard G. Carol	
1967	Hurry Sundown	Carter Sillens	
1967	Don't Make Waves	Himself	Uncredited
1968	Where Were You When the Lights Went Out?	Tru-Blue Lou	
1969	Hello Down There	T.R. Hollister	
1970	The Cockeyed Cowboys of Calico County	Staunch	
1970	Myra Breckinridge	Doctor	
1972	Now You See Him, Now You Don't	Timothy Forsythe	
1974	Goodnight Jackie	Mr. Landry	
1975	Konyok-gorbunok	The Tsar	Voice
1975	Crazy Mama	Mr. Albertson	
1975	Friday Foster	Enos Griffith	
1977	The Magic Pony	The Tsar	Voice, English version
1977	Pete's Dragon	Mayor of Passamaquoddy	
1978	Good Guys Wear Black	Doorman	
1979	Angels' Brigade	Cmdr. Lindsey March	
1979	The Electric Horseman	Mr. Magoo	Voice, Uncredited
1979	C.H.O.M.P.S.	Mr. Gibbs	
1980	There Goes the Bride	Mr. Perkins	
1982	Slapstick of Another Kind	President of the U.S.	
1984	Prince Jack	Dealy	
1981	Enchanted Journey	Gamun	Voice, English version

=== Television ===
Year	Title	Role	Notes
1952–1955	I Married Joan	Judge Bradley Stevens	98 episodes
1957	The Pied Piper of Hamelin	King's Emissary	TV movie
1957	What's My Line	Panelist	3 episodes
1960–1961	The Jim Backus Show	Mike O'Toole	39 episodes
1960–1961	The Untouchables	William Norbert	Episode: "Star Witness"
1960–1961	Mister Magoo	Mr. Magoo (voice)	130 episodes
1961	Maverick	Joe Wheelwright	Episode: "Three Queens Full"
1962	Mister Magoo's Christmas Carol	Ebenezer Scrooge / Mr. Magoo (voice)	TV special
1963	The Beverly Hillbillies	Marty Van Ransohoff	Episode: "The Clampetts Entertain"
1964–1965	The Famous Adventures of Mr. Magoo	Mr. Magoo (voice)	26 episodes
1964–1967	Gilligan's Island	Thurston Howell III	98 episodes
1964	Mr. Magoo in Sherwood Forest	Mr. Magoo (voice)	TV special
1966	Password	Himself	Game Show Contestant / Celebrity Guest Star
1967	Damn Yankees!	Coach Benny Van Buren	TV movie
1968	The Wild Wild West	Fabian Swanson	Episode: "The Night of the Sabatini Death"
1968–1969	Blondie	Mr. Dithers	16 episodes
1969	The Good Guys	Henry Arsdale	3 episodes
1969	Wake Me When the War Is Over	Colonel	TV movie
1970	I Dream of Jeannie	General Fitzhugh	Episode: "Help, Help, a Shark"
1970	Uncle Sam Magoo	Mr. Magoo (voice)	TV special
1970	What's My Line	Panelist	1 episode
1971–1974	The Brady Bunch	Zaccariah T. Brown / Harry Mathews	3 episodes
1972	Alias Smith and Jones	Joseph P. Sterling	Episode: "The Biggest Game in the West"
1973	The Girl Most Likely To...	Professor David Tilson	TV movie
1973	Miracle on 34th Street	Horace Shellhammer	TV movie
1974–1975	The New Adventures of Gilligan	Thurston Howell III (voice)	24 episodes
1974	Yes, Virginia, There Is a Santa Claus	Narrator / Santa Claus (voice)	TV special
1975	Gunsmoke	Reverend Sims	Episode: "Brides and Grooms"
1975	Kolchak: The Night Stalker	Herb Bresson	Episode: "Chopper"
1977	What's New, Mr. Magoo?	Mr. Magoo (voice)	16 episodes
1977	CHiPs	Weitzman	Episode: "Undertow"
1978	Fantasy Island	Cap Truman	Episode: "Anniversary/Reunion"
1978	Rescue from Gilligan's Island	Thurston Howell III	TV movie
1979	The Castaways on Gilligan's Island	Thurston Howell III	TV movie
1979	The Rebels	John Hancock	TV miniseries
1981	The Harlem Globetrotters on Gilligan's Island	Thurston Howell III	TV movie
1982	Gilligan's Planet	Thurston Howell III	13 episodes
1983	Family Feud	Himself/Gilligan’s Island reunion	Game show
