= Waymon Reed =

American jazz trumpeter

Waymon Reed (January 10, 1940, Fayetteville, North Carolina - November 25, 1983, Nashville, Tennessee) was an American jazz trumpeter. While he was principally a bebop soloist, he also worked in rhythm and blues (R&B). He never had any children, and was married from 1978 to 1981 to singer Sarah Vaughan.

== Career ==
Reed attended the Eastman School of Music and then played with jazz great, trumpeter/saxophonist Ira Sullivan. He joined James Brown's band from 1965 to 1969, where he played on "It's a Man's Man's Man's World". Reed worked with the big bands of Frank Foster and Thad Jones-Mel Lewis. He joined the Count Basie Orchestra in 1969, staying with Basie until 1973. He returned to play with Basie again in 1977–78. He married Sarah Vaughan and worked with her from 1978–80, but shortly afterwards they divorced. He played on B.B. King's album There Must Be a Better World Somewhere in 1981.

In 1977, Reed recorded his one album as leader, 46th and 8th, featured tenor-saxophonist Jimmy Forrest, pianist Tommy Flanagan, bassist Keter Betts and drummer Bobby Durham. This album's recording session took place in New York City, 46th Street at the Sound Ideas Studios. It was produced by John Snyder and released in 1979.

Reed died of cancer in 1983.

== Discography ==
=== As a Leader ===
- 46th and 8th (Artists House, 1977)

=== As a Sideman ===
With Count Basie Orchestra

- Basic Basie (MPS, 1969)
- Basie on the Beatles (Happy Tiger, 1969)
- High Voltage (MPS, 1970)
- Afrique (Flying Dutchman Records, 1970)
- Montreux '77 (Pablo, 1977)
- Live in Japan '78 (Pablo, 1978)

With B.B. King

- There Must Be a Better World Somewhere (MCA, 1981)

With George Benson

- Body Talk (CTI, 1973)

With James Brown

- Foundations of Funk – A Brand New Bag: 1964–1969 (Polydor, 1964–69)
- Cold Sweat (King, 1967)
- I Got the Feelin' (King, 1968)

With Hank Crawford

- Midnight Ramble (Milestone, 1982)

With Al Grey

- Struttin' and Shoutin' (Columbia, 1976 [1983])

With Eddie Jefferson

- Still on the Planet (Muse, 1976)

With Thad Jones/Mel Lewis Orchestra

- New Life (A&M / Horizon, 1975)
