= I'll Always Have You There =

Song by Doug Gibbs
- A-side: "I'll Always Have You There"
- B-side: "Cloudy Day"
- Released: 1972
- Genre: Soul
- Label: Oak OR-108
- Composers: Bruce Fisher, Doug Gibbs
- Producer: Ernie Freeman

"I'll Always Have You There" was a hit for singer and session musician Doug Gibbs. Released on the Oak label in 1972, it reached No. 25 on the Billboard soul chart.

== Background ==
The 1972 single backed with "Cloudy Day" was released on Oak OR-108. Both sides were co-written by himself and Bruce Fisher. It was produced by Ernie Freeman. Later in 1972, the record was attracting attention, and it was reported in the September 2 issue of Billboard Magazine, that the single was getting heavy airplay in Chicago and San Francisco.

== Chart performance ==
=== Billboard ===
The record entered the soul singles chart at No. 37 for the week ending September 9, 1972. It peaked on the chart at No. 25 on October 7, 1972.

=== Cashbox ===
The song entered the Cashbox R&B Top 60 at No. 45 on September 23, 1972. On October 14, it peaked at No. 32.
