= Live at Manchester Craftsmen's Guild =

Live album by Count Basie Orchestra
- Released: February 10, 1996
- Recorded: February 10, 1996
- Venue: Manchester Craftsmen's Guild, Pittsburgh, Pennsylvania
- Genre: Jazz, big band
- Length: 45:58
- Label: Blue Jackel
- Producer: Marty Ashby

Count Basie Orchestra chronology
| Jazzin' (1996) | Live at Manchester Craftsmen's Guild (1996) | At Long Last (1998) |

Live at Manchester Craftsmen's Guild is an album by the Count Basie Orchestra that won the Grammy Award for Best Large Jazz Ensemble Album in 1997. The orchestra is led by Grover Mitchell and features four songs with New York Voices.

== Track listing ==
| No. | Title | Writer(s) | Length |
|---|---|---|---|
| 1. | "Down for the Count" | Frank Foster | 5:50 |
| 2. | "Whirlybird" | Neal Hefti | 3:40 |
| 3. | "Cotton Tail" | Duke Ellington | 3:03 |
| 4. | "In a Mellow Tone" | Duke Ellington, Milt Gabler | 7:18 |
| 5. | "Basie" | Ernie Wilkins | 4:25 |
| 6. | "Please Send Me Someone to Love" | Percy Mayfield | 4:09 |
| 7. | "Bug Out" | Eric Dixon | 6:29 |
| 8. | "Love Makes the World Go Round" | Jon Hendricks, Patrick Leonard, Madonna | 4:50 |
| 9. | "Farmer's Market" | Art Farmer | 3:14 |
| 10. | "Basie Power" | Ernie Wilkins | 3:00 |

== Personnel ==
Credits adapted from AllMusic.

- Grover Mitchell – conductor
- Mike Williams – flugelhorn, trumpet
- Scotty Barnhart – flugelhorn, trumpet
- Clarence Banks – trombone
- Alvin Walker II – trombone
- Mel Wanzo – trombone
- Emmanuel Boyd – flute, alto saxophone
- Doug Miller – arranger, flute, tenor saxophone
- John Williams – bass clarinet, baritone saxophone
- Will Matthews – guitar
- George Caldwell – piano
- Brian Grice – drums

New York Voices

- Peter Eldridge – backing vocals
- Darmon Meader – arranger, backing vocals
- Kim Nazarian – backing vocals
- Lauren Kinhan – backing vocals

Production

- Marty Ashby – producer
- Dino DiStefano – engineer
- Jay Dudt – engineer, mixing
- Jay Ashby – mixing
