= Papa Lightfoot =

- Also known as: Papa George Lightfoot
- Born: Alexander Lightfoot; March 2, 1924; Natchez, Mississippi, U.S.
- Died: November 28, 1971 (aged 47) Natchez, Mississippi, U.S.
- Genres: Blues; Delta blues
- Instruments: Harmonica; vocals
- Years active: 1940s–1971
- Labels: Peacock; Sultan; Aladdin; Imperial; Savoy; Vault; Liberty

Alexander "Papa" Lightfoot (March 2, 1924 – November 28, 1971), also known as Papa George Lightfoot, was an American blues singer and harmonica player.

== Biography ==
Born in Natchez, Mississippi, Lightfoot recorded several sessions in his late twenties—for Peacock Records in 1949 (which were never issued), Sultan Records in 1950, Aladdin Records in 1952, and Imperial Records in 1954. After final singles for Savoy Records in 1955 and Excello Records in 1956, Lightfoot quit recording, still an obscure Southern blues harmonica player.

As interest grew in rural Delta blues in the 1960s, Lightfoot's name became more well-known and, in 1969, record producer Steve LaVere went to Lightfoot's home town of Natchez, and asked him to record again. The result was the album Natchez Trace, released on Vault Records in 1969, which brought Lightfoot briefly to the forefront of the blues revival. Rural Blues Vol. 2 followed on Liberty Records later that same year.

However, his comeback was cut short by his death in November 1971 of respiratory failure in Natchez, Mississippi.

The recordings were reissued in 1995 as Goin' Back to the Natchez Trace, with six additional tracks and recorded monologue.

In 2009, Lightfoot was posthumously honored with a marker on the Mississippi Blues Trail in Natchez, granted by the Mississippi Blues Foundation.

== See also ==
- List of electric blues musicians
