= Midnight Ramble (album) =

Studio album by Hank Crawford
- Released: 1982
- Recorded: JAC Studio, New York, November 4, 5 & 10, 1982
- Genre: Jazz, soul
- Label: Milestone

Hank Crawford chronology
I Hear a Symphony (1975)	Midnight Ramble (1982)	Indigo Blue (1983)

Professional ratings
Review scores
Source	Rating
AllMusic	3.5/5 stars
The Penguin Guide to Jazz Recordings	3/4 stars
The Rolling Stone Jazz Record Guide	3/5 stars

Midnight Ramble is a soul-jazz album by saxophonist Hank Crawford. Released in 1982, it was his first recording for Milestone Records.

== Track listing ==
1. "Midnight Ramble"
2. "Forever Mine"
3. "Theme for Basie"
4. "Sister C"
5. "Street of Dreams"
6. "Next Time You See Me"
7. "Deep River"

== Personnel ==
- Hank Crawford - alto saxophone, electric piano
- David “Fathead” Newman - tenor saxophone
- Howard Johnson - baritone saxophone
- Waymon Reed - trumpet
- Charlie Miller - trumpet
- Dick Griffin - trombone
- Calvin Newborn - guitar
- Dr. John - piano, organ
- Charles "Flip" Greene - bass
- Bernard Purdie - drum kit
