= Jimmie Gordon =

American Chicago blues musician (1906–1993)

- Also known as: The Mississippi Mudder; Georgia Pine Boy; Joe Bullum
- Born: probably 1906
- Died: possible October 27, 1993
- Genres: Chicago blues
- Occupations: Singer-songwriter; Pianist
- Instruments: Piano; Vocals
- Years active: 1934–1946
- Label: Primarily Decca

Jimmie Gordon (probably 1906 – possible October 27, 1993) was an American Chicago blues pianist, singer, and songwriter. In the course of his career he accompanied Memphis Minnie, Bumble Bee Slim, and Big Bill Broonzy, amongst others. He had a hit with "I'd Rather Drink Muddy Water" (1936) and was active on the Chicago blues scene for a number of years leading up to World War II. He is known to have recorded 67 tracks between 1934 and 1946. Gordon was a mainstay of Decca Records during the 1930s and early 1940s, with his recorded work utilizing a piano accompaniment (often his own), as well as guitar, or with a small band that he assembled for the work.

As a songwriter, Gordon is often credited with writing "Mean Mistreater", later recorded by both Muddy Waters and Johnny Winter. AllMusic noted that "Gordon was a passable pianist who sang with all his heart in a warm and convincing voice."

Details of his life outside the recording studio are sketchy and have been the subject of rumor and speculation over the years.

== Life and career ==
It was once thought that Gordon was born in St. Louis, but that was based solely on his performance on the B-side of a single by the St. Louis–born Peetie Wheatstraw, following a session recorded in October 1938 with the guitar player Lonnie Johnson.

Whatever his origin and background, by 1934 Gordon was signed to a recording contract. Apart from one Bluebird side at the beginning of his recording career, all of Gordon's pre-war work was released by Decca. Gordon's backing ensembles, sometimes billed as the Vip Vop Band, variously included such notable blues and jazz musicians as Scrapper Blackwell, the brothers Papa Charlie McCoy and Kansas Joe McCoy, members of the Harlem Hamfats, Frankie Newton, Pete Brown, Buster Bennett, and the drummer Zutty Singleton. This ability to base backing units around a jazz-blues fusion of musicians was started by the Harlem Hamfats, but Gordon's use of this arrangement proved the basis for many later blues bands. His most commercially successful number was a song he wrote, "I'd Rather Drink Muddy Water", in 1936. His ability to raise social issues in his songs is shown by "Don't Take Away My P.W.A." (1936), a homage of sorts to the Public Works Administration (P.W.A.), a large-scale public works construction agency in the United States in the Great Depression of the 1930s.

Even in his own lifetime Gordon was misrepresented. When his record company released "Black Gal" (Decca 7043), early copies credited the work to "Joe Bullum"; later copies of the disc were released with a corrected credit.

Four jump blues titles of his were released on the King and Queen labels in 1946. On these his backing was billed as the Bip Bop Band, a nod to the changing fashions in music at that time. Gordon also recorded some dirty blues, with his songs "Hard Lead Pencil" and "How You Want It Done", both of which were reissued on the compilation album Let Me Squeeze Your Lemon. All of Gordon's known work has been compiled on a series of albums released by Document Records.

Nothing is known of Gordon's life after his recording career ended.

He has been mistaken for the similarly named Jimmy Gordon, the bass singer with the Four Tunes.

== Selected compilation albums ==
Year	Title	Record label
1987	Jimmie Gordon: 1934–1941	Story of the Blues
2000	Complete Recordings, Vol. 1, 1934–1936	Document
2000	Complete Recordings, Vol. 2, 1936–1938	Document
2000	Complete Recordings, Vol. 3, 1939–1946	Document
