= Mission Bell (Donnie Brooks song) =

Single by Donnie Brooks

from the album The Happiest
- B-side: "Do It for Me"
- Released: February 1960
- Genre: Pop
- Length: 2:20
- Label: Era
- Songwriters: William Michael, Jesse Hodges

Donnie Brooks singles chronology
"The Devil Aint a Man" (1959)	"Mission Bell" (1960)	"Doll House" (1960)

"Mission Bell" is a song written by William Michael and Jesse Hodges and performed by Donnie Brooks, with backing vocals by The Blossoms. It reached number 7 on the U.S. pop chart in 1960. It was featured on his 1961 album, The Happiest.

The song ranked at number 64 on Billboard magazine's Top 100 singles of 1960.

== Other versions ==
- Ronnie Hilton released a version of the song as a single in 1960 in the UK, but it did not chart.
- Gary Miller released a version of the song as a single in 1960 in the UK, but it did not chart.
- Jimmy Velvet released a version of the song as the B-side to his 1964 single "Teen Angel".
- P. J. Proby released a version of the song on his 1965 album, P.J. Proby.
- Wes Dakus' Rebels released a version of the song on their 1966 album, Wes Dakus' Rebels.
- Gene Pitney released a version of the song on his 1967 album, Golden Greats.
- Fleetwood Mac released a version of the song on their 1970 album, Kiln House.
- Tiny Tim released a version of the song on his 1996 album, Tiny Tim's Christmas Album.
