= Indigo Blue (album) =

Studio album by Hank Crawford
- Released: 1983
- Recorded: August 1983
- Genre: Jazz
- Label: Milestone

Hank Crawford chronology
Midnight Ramble (1982)	Indigo Blue (1983)	Down on the Deuce (1984)

Indigo Blue is an album by the American saxophonist Hank Crawford, released in 1983. Crawford supported the album with a North American tour.

== Production ==
The album was recorded in New York City in August 1983. Crawford played saxophone and electric piano on the songs, which are mostly ballads and blues. "All Alone and Blue" is a version of the Percy Mayfield song. "Just for a Thrill" was written in part by Lil Armstrong. "The Very Thought of You" was composed by Ray Noble. "Funny" is an interpretation of the Willie Nelson song. "Things Ain't What They Used to Be" is a version of the standard made famous by Duke Ellington. Dr. John played organ and piano on some tracks; Melvin Sparks played guitar. Bernard Purdie played drums and Wilbur Bascomb played bass. Crawford employed a four-piece horn section that included David "Fathead" Newman.

== Critical reception ==
Professional ratings
Review scores
Source	Rating
AllMusic	4/5 stars
Lincoln Journal Star	4/5 stars
MusicHound Jazz: The Essential Album Guide	3/5 stars
Omaha World-Herald	3/5 stars
The Penguin Guide to Jazz Recordings	2.5/4 stars
The Philadelphia Inquirer	4/5 stars
The Rolling Stone Jazz Record Guide	3/5 stars
The Sun	2/5 stars
The Virgin Encyclopedia of Popular Music	3/5 stars

The Philadelphia Inquirer noted that Crawford's "alto sax style remains heavily influenced by Memphis blues and R&B, which are strong elements here." The Morning Call called the album "a cohesive collection of eclectic material", concluding that "Crawford's second Milestone offering rivals the quality of the first". The Herald labeled Crawford "a balladeer and lyrical mood-spinner of the first rank." The Sun said that Crawford "plays with more grit than usual... It's all quite pleasant and funky." The Sun, of Baltimore, lamented that "the fact that [Crawford] is playing two instruments necessitates enough overdubbing to blunt the momentum of the performances."

In 1991, the Chicago Tribune opined that "Crawford's sound has the edgy quality and swing that the imitators lack." AllMusic praised the performances of Dr. John and Crawford and said, "The bittersweet ballad 'Just for a Thrill' ends the set, with some of the sweetest and most lyrical piano and alto playing either man had done on a record until that time."

== Track listing ==
Side 1

1. "All Alone and Blue"
2. "The Very Thought of You"
3. "Things Ain't What They Used to Be"

Side 2

1. "Funny"
2. "Indigo Blue"
3. "Just for a Thrill"
