= Live in Japan '78 =

Live album by Count Basie
- Released: 1978
- Recorded: May 21, 1978
- Genre: Jazz
- Length: 47:52
- Label: Pablo
- Producer: Norman Granz

Count Basie chronology
Montreux '77 (1977)	Live in Japan '78 (1978)	On the Road (1979)

Professional ratings
Review scores
Source	Rating
Allmusic	3/5 stars
The Penguin Guide to Jazz Recordings	3/4 stars

Live in Japan '78 is a 1978 live album by Count Basie and his orchestra.

== Track listing ==
1. "The Heat's On" (Sammy Nestico) – 3:13
2. "Freckle Face" (Nestico) – 5:39
3. "Ja-Da" (Bob Carlton) – 5:28
4. "Things Ain't What They Used to Be" (Mercer Ellington, Ted Persons) – 3:56
5. "A Bit of This and a Bit of That" (Count Basie, Wood) – 3:41
6. "All of Me" (Gerald Marks, Seymour Simons) – 3:06
7. "Shiny Stockings" (Frank Foster) – 4:37
8. "Left Hand Funk" (Nestico, Jeff Steinberg) – 5:51
9. "John the III" (Bobby Plater) – 3:56
10. "Basie" (Ernie Wilkins) – 4:52
11. "Black Velvet" (Illinois Jacquet, Nestico) – 3:54
12. "Jumpin' at the Woodside" (Basie, Jon Hendricks) – 3:20

== Personnel ==
The Count Basie Orchestra

- Count Basie - piano
- Sonny Cohn - trumpet
- Pete Minger - trumpet
- Waymon Reed - trumpet
- Nolan Shaheed - trumpet
- Dennis Wilson - trombone
- Alonzo Wesley Jr. - trombone
- Bill Hughes - trombone
- Mel Wanzo - trombone
- Bobby Plater - alto saxophone
- Danny Turner - alto saxophone
- Eric Dixon - tenor saxophone, flute
- Kenny Hing - tenor saxophone
- Charlie Fowlkes - baritone saxophone
- John Clayton - double bass
- Freddie Green - guitar
- Mickey Roker - drums
