= Down on the Deuce =

Studio album by Hank Crawford
- Released: 1984
- Genre: Jazz, R&B
- Label: Milestone

Hank Crawford chronology
Indigo Blue (1983)	Down on the Deuce (1984)	Roadhouse Symphony (1985)

Down on the Deuce is an album by American saxophonist Hank Crawford, released in 1984 by Milestone Records. Initially released as an LP, it was made available on CD in 1998 via a re-release. It features David Newman on tenor saxophone and flute, and Cedar Walton on piano.

== Critical reception ==
Ken Franckling on United Press International called it "very pleasant" and stated that "Crawford provides a soulful blend of mainstream alto saxophone work". Jazz critic Scott Yanow praised the album, writing for AllMusic that "this Hank Crawford session was his third for Milestone and follows his appealing soul jazz formula", although he criticized the material, stating that it was not as strong as usual". Douglas Payne, writing for All About Jazz, stated that the "deep, rich, signature sound of Hank Crawford's alto saxophone is a reliable joy". While he noted that some of the tracks were "bland", Payne stated that "there's enough of that good Hank Crawford soul to keep Down on the Deuce interesting and worthwhile."

== Charts ==
Chart (1984)	Peak position
US Top Jazz Albums (Billboard)	32
US Best Selling Jazz LPs (Billboard)	48

== Track listing ==
No.	Title	Length
1.	"Down on the Deuce"	7:10
2.	"Used to Be Love"	6:47
3.	"Down Home Blues"	5:34
4.	"Through the Years"	6:22
5.	"Survival"	7:54
6.	"When a Man Loves a Woman"	5:02
