= Truth of Truths =

Truth of Truths - a Contemporary Rock Opera

Studio album by Assorted
- Released: 1971
- Recorded: 1971
- Genres: Contemporary Christian music, rock opera
- Length: 92:46
- Label: Oak Records
- Producer: Ray Ruff

Truth of Truths - a Contemporary Rock Opera is a 1971 two-disc Christian rock album, which was largely conceived by promoter/producer Ray Ruff. The album is arranged as a rock opera based on significant events in the Christian Bible, with the first two sides pertaining to the Old Testament and two to the New Testament. The album has a black cover with a white title and a gold Star of David and Cross. It comes with a 17-page booklet with lyrics and biblical references for each of the songs.

The double LP was substantially co-written with former Them bassist Alan Henderson, and with Val Stöecklein, formerly of The Blue Things (whose most famous song "Orange Rooftops Of Your Mind" is re-recorded here with new lyrics as "John the Baptist"). Both bands had been managed by Ray Ruff. Donnie Brooks plays Christ. Actor Jim Backus plays the spoken voice of God.

== Track listing ==
All God parts by Ray Ruff

Track 1 conceived and produced by Ray Ruff

Side one
No.	Title	Writer(s)	Biblical Reference	Length
1.	"The Overture"	Ernie Freeman		4:29
2.	"Creation"	Alan Henderson	Genesis 1 & 2	3:06
3.	"The Fall"	Henderson & Hieronymus	Genesis 3	4:52
4.	"Forty Days and Forty Night"	Don Great	Genesis 6-8	4:13
5.	"Tower Of Babel"	Don Great	Genesis 11	2:12
6.	"God Called On To Abraham"	Great	Genesis 12 & 17	3:04
7.	"Sodom and Gomorrah Were the Cities of Sin"	Great	Genesis 19	3:13
Total length:				25:09

Side two
No.	Title	Writer(s)	Biblical Reference	Length
8.	"Joseph, Beloved Son of Israel"	Henderson	Genesis 37-45	3:10
9.	"Let My People Go"	Kay & Helen Lewis	Exodus 1-15, 32	4:05
10.	"The Ten Commandments"	Stöecklein	Exodus 1-15, 32	2:45
11.	"Song of the Children of Israel"	Stöecklein	Exodus 15	2:42
12.	"David to Bathsheba"	Stöecklein	2 Samuel 11, 12	3:02
13.	"Turn Back to God"	Lewis	Jeremiah 2-5	3:12
14.	"Prophecies of the Coming of Messiah"	Henderson	Isaiah 7:14; 9:6,7; 53:3-7; Micah 5:2; Jeremiah 31:15; Deuteronomy 18:15; Zechariah 11:12; 12:10; Psalms 16:10; 27:12; 41:9; 68:18	3:23
Total length:				22:19

Side three
No.	Title	Writer(s)	Biblical Reference	Length
15.	"My Life is in Your Hands"	Ray Ruff & Henderson	Luke 1:46-56	2:50
16.	"John The Baptist"	Ruff & Henderson	John 1:19-37	2:34
17.	"He's The Light of The World"	Lewis	Matthew 5,6; John 3	3:53
18.	"Hosanna"	Ruff & Henderson	Matthew 21	2:20
19.	"The Last Supper"	Stöecklein	Matthew 26: 1-35; John 13	4:45
20.	"I Am What I Say I Am"	Great	Matthew 26: 36-56	2:20
21.	"The Trial"	Lewis	Matthew 26:57 - 27:31	5:12
Total length:				23:54

Side four
No.	Title	Writer(s)	Biblical Reference	Length
22.	"The Road"	Lewis	Luke 23: 26-33	4:05
23.	"The Cross"	Lewis	Luke 23: 34-39	1:55
24.	"Resurrection"	Stöecklein	John 20: 11-18	4:45
25.	"He Will Come Again"	Lloyd Schoonmaker & Roger Lanoue	Matthew 24: 29-31; Revelation 19: 11-16	2:50
26.	"Prophecies of the Coming of The End of the World"	Ruff & Henderson	1 Thess 4: 13-18; Revelation 6-22	6:13
Total length:				19:48 92:46

== Personnel ==
- Ray Ruff: Producer
- Rev. Raymond Harrison: Research
- Ernie Freeman: Arrangement
- Dick Hieronymus: Arrangement
- Jim Backus: the voice of God
- Donnie Brooks: Lead Vocals
- Dick & Sandy St. John: Lead Vocals
- John and Mike Mancha: Lead Vocals
- Lise Miller: Lead Vocals
- Patti Sterling: Lead Vocals
- Dave Rene: Lead Vocals
- Ben Short: Lead Vocals
- Pat Liston of the Friends and Brothers: Lead Vocals
- Lloyd Schoonmaker: Lead Vocals
- Don Great: Lead Vocals
- Doug Gibbs: Lead Vocals
- Val Stöecklein: Lead Vocals
- Background Vocals: Sonny Craver, Scott Thompson, Roberta Watson, Patrice Holloway, Andrea Albin, Janie Mickens Lovett, Doris Thompson, Karen Bourne, Judi Brown, Joanne Willis, Karen Ditto, Jessie Richardson, John and Herb.
- Musicians: Bill Kurasch, Sid Sharp, Christine Walevska, Hal Blaine, John Guerin, Larry Carlton, Dennis Budimir, Reinie Press, Larry Muhoberac, Gary Coleman, Joe Osborn, John Raines, Art Zungolo, Ralff Schaeffer, Ray Kelly, Harry Hyams, Sam Boghossian, Paul Hubinon, Tony Terran, Ed Stanley, Julie Jacob, Bill Fritz, Sinclair Lott, George Price, Robert Enevoldsen, Lou McCreary, Dick Hyde, Joseph DiFiore, Henry Ferber, Tibor Zelig, Arthur Maebe, William Hinshaw, Jerry Cole, and Ray Pohlman.

Reissued on a special collectors edition digitally remastered double CD album in 2018 by Oak Records Inc. LLC, produced by Don J. Long.
