= Dan Terry =

American big band leader and trumpet and flugelhorn player (1924–2011)

- Born: Daniel Kostraba; December 22, 1924; Kingston, Pennsylvania, U.S.
- Died: December 27, 2011 (aged 87) Danville, Illinois, U.S.
- Genres: Jazz
- Occupations: Musician, bandleader, arranger
- Instruments: Trumpet, flugelhorn

Dan Terry (December 22, 1924 – December 27, 2011) was an American big band leader, arranger, and trumpet and flugelhorn player who appeared at the Birdland jazz club with Dinah Washington, Sarah Vaughan, Chris Connor, Johnny Smith, and others.

He also made half a dozen LP recordings, including 20 sides on Columbia Records in 1954, and wrote music for and performed in the films The Hustler and The Manchurian Candidate.

== Biography ==
The son of a choirmaster, he was born Daniel Kostraba in Kingston, Pennsylvania. After working with George Summerson's territory band in high school, he went to New York City and worked with Muggsy Spanier before entering the United States Marine Corps. After leaving the service, he moved to Los Angeles to lead the Hollywood Teenagers Band before returning to New York in 1948 to play with Sonny Dunham for eight months. Terry studied music theory at the College of the Pacific on the GI Bill from 1948 to 1949.

Terry then formed a band and went on the road. Engagements included the Totem Pole Ballroom in Boston, the Aragon and Trianon Ballrooms in Chicago, Glen Island Casino, Tahoe Village, Chase Club in St. Louis, Peabody Hotel in Memphis, Roosevelt Hotel in New Orleans, and the Statler Hotel in New York, as well as appearing at proms and concerts. He recorded four sides arranged by Marty Paich for Vita Records in 1952, including "Autumn in New York" and "Terry Cloth".

Terry's band went into Birdland in 1954, playing with Sarah Vaughan and Dinah Washington. Also in 1954, he was signed by Columbia with Pete Rugolo and Les Elgart. He recorded 20 sides included on Teen Age Dance Session (Columbia) and Teen Age Dance Party (Harmony). During the same year, he appeared in the Universal film short Birth of a Band with Connie Haines and Don Gordon.

Terry and his band performed at Carnegie Hall for the Charlie Parker Memorial Concert with Dinah Washington and other jazz celebrities. He toured with the Birdland All Stars at Boston Arena and Carnegie Hall as a featured artist with the Count Basie Band. The September 25, 1954, Carnegie Hall performance was recorded for a live album called Birdland All-Stars at Carnegie Hall with Count Basie and Lester Young on Roulette Records. In 1958, he and his Band with the Hi-Fi Sound recorded "Coca-Cola Rock" and "Bull Fiddle Walk" on Devere Records with the Freddie Martel Singers.

In the 1960s, Terry wrote music for and performed in the films The Hustler and The Manchurian Candidate. He was on the music staff for The Dean Martin Show, The Hollywood Palace, six television specials with Jackie Gleason, Gleason's recordings for Capitol Records, and twelve albums with George Williams for CBS.

Terry owned and operated Big Daddy's Nightclub at the Travel and Transportation Building at the 1964 New York World's Fair. He was musical director at the Basin Street East club in New York from 1962 to 1965 and conductor for Sammy Davis Jr. with the Will Mastin Trio, Frances Langford, Noonan and Marshall, and Yma Sumac.

After returning to the West Coast, Terry recorded the album Lonely Place, which was released by Happy Tiger Records in 1969. He then moved to Las Vegas, where he was prominent in the city's music community in the 1970s and early 1980s. He played trumpet and led his big band in performances at the Pussycat A-Go-Go Club, the Tropicana, the Mint, Thunderbird, and Sahara hotels, and in 1979, a four-week engagement at the Dunes Hotel with weekly radio broadcasts on KDWN-AM. While there, he served as president of Copyrite Music, a music service which included composing, conducting, arranging, and music preparation.

From 1976 to 1977, Terry lived in Toronto, where he formed the Horns of Toronto. He and the band appeared at venues such as the Savarin Nightclub, The Forum at Ontario Place, the Canadian National Exhibition Bandshell, Sheraton Grand Hotel, and the Leisure Lodge in Cambridge, Ontario.

In the 1990s, Terry settled in San Diego and formed the Horns of San Diego and an offshoot, the San Diego Youth Swing Band, a group designed to give high school musicians an opportunity to perform his big band arrangements. Musicians in the band included trumpeter Igmar Thomas and drummer Mikey Cannon. He produced the band's album Bein' Green on the Metronome label in 1999.

In addition to his recordings and touring, Terry worked as a jazz radio announcer for 40 years at radio stations in Stockton, California, Las Vegas, Middletown, Orange County, New York, and Phoenix, Arizona. He died in Danville, Illinois in December 2011 at the age of 87.

== Discography ==
- Vita Records: Hollywood, CA - 1952 – produced and recorded "Autumn in New York" and the minor hit "Terry Cloth"
- Teen Age Dance Session (Columbia, 1954)
- Teen Age Dance Party (Harmony, 1957)
- "Coca-Cola Rock" and "Bull Fiddle Walk" (Devere, 1958) - 45 rpm single featuring Dan Terry and His Band with the Hi-Fi Sound
- Good Feeling Blues (Cinema, 1962) – produced and recorded live album in concert at Virginia Polytechnic Institute
- Reedtime (Metronome, 1962) – produced and recorded experimental orchestra featuring soprano saxophones
- Lonely Place (Metronome, 1969) – produced and recorded album released by Happy Tiger Records
- Dan Terry Big Big Band (Metronome, 1981) – produced and recorded album
- Bein' Green (Metronome, 1999) – produced and recorded San Diego Youth Swing Band album

== Films ==
- Birth of a Band, Universal Pictures & Will Cowan Productions, Inc. Starred in the musical short with his band and Connie Haines.
- The Manchurian Candidate, Composed and arranged the music for the rally sequence of the film and appeared directing the marching band he contracted.
- The Hustler, 20th Century Fox, Robert Rossen, director. Appeared in the picture with his Dixieland Band. Composed and arranged the music for the party sequence with Paul Newman and Jackie Gleason, receiving screen credits.
