= Basie on the Beatles =

Studio album by Count Basie and His Orchestra
- Released: 1970
- Recorded: December 15, 1969; NYC
- Genre: Jazz
- Length: 35:34
- Labels: Happy Tiger; HT-1007
- Producer: Dick Peirce

Count Basie chronology
Basic Basie (1968)	Basie on the Beatles (1970)	High Voltage (1970)

Basie on the Beatles is an album by pianist and bandleader Count Basie featuring performances recorded in late 1969 and released on the short-lived Happy Tiger label. It was Basie's second album of Beatles' compositions following 1966's Basie's Beatle Bag and featured liner notes by Ringo Starr.

== Reception ==
Professional ratings
Review scores
Source	Rating
AllMusic	2/5 stars
The Penguin Guide to Jazz Recordings	3/4 stars

The initial Billboard magazine review stated that "Basie takes on the Beatles music with all the feel and drive of music written especially for the band! This highly commercial LP clearly proves that point as the band swings through top Bob Florence arrangements". AllMusic awarded the album 2 stars, and The Penguin Guide to Jazz Recordings awarded it 4 stars.

== Track listing ==
All compositions by John Lennon and Paul McCartney except for Track 3, by George Harrison.

1. "Norwegian Wood (This Bird Has Flown)" – 2:55
2. "The Fool on the Hill" – 3:19
3. "Something" – 3:25
4. "With a Little Help from My Friends" – 3:23
5. "Here, There and Everywhere" – 2:34
6. "Get Back" – 3:22
7. "Hey Jude" – 4:20
8. "Eleanor Rigby" – 2:56
9. "Penny Lane" – 3:17
10. "Come Together" – 2:42
11. "Yesterday" – 3:21

== Personnel ==
- Count Basie – piano, organ
- Sonny Cohn, Gene Goe, Luis Gasca – trumpet
- Waymon Reed – trumpet, flugelhorn
- Grover Mitchell, Mel Wanzo – trombone
- Bill Hughes – bass trombone
- Marshal Royal – alto saxophone, clarinet
- Bobby Plater – alto saxophone, flute
- Eric Dixon – tenor saxophone, flute
- Eddie "Lockjaw" Davis – tenor saxophone
- Charlie Fowlkes – baritone saxophone
- Freddie Green – guitar
- Norman Keenan – bass, electric bass
- Carol Kaye – electric bass
- Harold Jones – drums
- Bob Florence – arranger
