= 46th and 8th =

Studio album by Waymon Reed
- Released: 1979
- Recorded: May 25, 1977
- Studio: Sound Ideas Studios, New York City
- Genre: Jazz
- Length: 45:47
- Label: Artists House; AH 10
- Producer: John Snyder

46th and 8th is the sole album led by trumpeter Waymon Reed recorded in 1977 and released on the Artists House label in 1979.

== Reception ==
Professional ratings
Review scores
Source	Rating
AllMusic	4/5 stars
DownBeat	4/5 stars

AllMusic reviewer Scott Yanow stated: "This was his only opportunity to lead a record date and the results are pleasingly straightahead. ... Nothing surprising occurs but Reed (particularly on a warm version of the ballad "But Beautiful") is in fine form".

DownBeat assigned the album 4 stars. Reviewer Jay Safane wrote, "This fine album reveals more on repeated hearings".

== Track listing ==
1. "Don't Get Around Much Anymore" (Duke Ellington, Bob Russell) − 8:54
2. "Au Privave" (Charlie Parker) − 9:03
3. "46th and 8th" (Waymon Reed) − 5:39
4. "But Beautiful" (Jimmy Van Heusen, Johnny Burke) − 8:27
5. "Blue Monk" (Thelonious Monk) − 6:59

== Personnel ==
- Waymon Reed − trumpet, flugelhorn
- Jimmy Forrest − tenor saxophone
- Tommy Flanagan − piano
- Keter Betts − bass
- Bobby Durham − drums
