= James Talley =

American singer-songwriter (born 1944)

- Born: November 9, 1943 (age 82); Tulsa, Oklahoma, United States
- Genres: Country, Country pop, Country blues, electric blues
- Occupation: Singer-songwriter
- Website: www.jamestalley.com

James Talley (born November 9, 1944) is an American country, country blues and electric blues singer-songwriter.

== Biography ==
Born in Tulsa, Oklahoma, Talley is an artist whose vision of the American experience, as author David McGee has said, is "startlingly original." At the age of three, Talley's family moved from their home in Mehan, Oklahoma, near Stillwater, to Washington state, where his father worked as a chemical operator in the Hanford plutonium factory. After five years in Richland, Washington, and realizing the hazards his father's employment presented, the family relocated to Albuquerque, New Mexico. Talley graduated from the University of New Mexico with a degree in fine arts.

After college, encouraged by Pete Seeger while on a trip to New Mexico, Talley began to write songs that drew upon the culture of the Southwest. These early songs eventually became The Road to Torreón, a saga of life and death in the Chicano villages of northern New Mexico. Released in a boxed edition by Bear Family Records in 1992, it was a collaboration of photography and music, with a photographic essay contributed by Talley's lifelong friend, photographer Cavalliere Ketchum.

In 1968, Talley moved from New Mexico to Nashville, Tennessee to try to get his songs released. Over the years Johnny Cash, Johnny Paycheck, Gene Clark, Alan Jackson, Hazel Dickens, and most recently Moby, have recorded his songs. His album Got No Bread, No Milk, No Money, But We Sure Got a Lot of Love was released during an era when outlaw country was gaining ground in Nashville. Joining country music and the blues, B. B. King, played his first Nashville session with Talley in 1976, as his lead guitar player.

Talley's recording career now spans over thirty years. John Hammond, Sr. at Columbia Records in New York was his first mentor, and championed his writing in the early 1970s. When Hammond could not get Talley signed to Columbia, he sent him to Jerry Wexler, who was starting a new Nashville operation with his Atlantic label at the time. Wexler signed Talley to his first recording contract at Atlantic Records. Atlantic's Nashville operation, however, did not do well at the time and Atlantic closed its Nashville office.

Talley then moved to Capitol Records where he released four albums during the mid-1970s: Got No Bread, No Milk, No Money, But We Sure Got a Lot of Love (1975); Tryin’ Like The Devil (1976); Blackjack Choir (1977) and Ain't It Somethin’ (1977). Rolling Stone, and other music publications, have declared these albums American classics for their time. The 1976 song "Are They Gonna Make Us Outlaws Again?" was ranked number 60 in the book Heartaches by the Number - Country Music's 500 Greatest Singles.

During the 1980s and 1990s, Talley recorded four albums, which were released in Europe by the German Bear Family Records, American Originals (1985); and Love Songs and The Blues (1989); The Road To Torreón (1992) and James Talley: Live (1994).

In 1999, Talley started his own artist's label, Cimarron Records, and released Woody Guthrie and Songs of My Oklahoma Home (2000), his only album that covered someone else's songs; Nashville City Blues, (2000), and was named Amazon.com's Folk Artist of the Year 2000. In 2002, Touchstones was released – a fresh retrospective of the songs from his early career. It was recorded in Texas with the help of Talley's old friends, Joe Ely and Ponty Bone. In 2004 Journey was released, a live recording made on his tour of Italy. It displayed some of his classics as well as five new compositions. In February 2006, Talley's debut album, Got No Bread, No Milk, No Money, But We Sure Got a Lot of Love was reissued in a special 30th anniversary edition.

In July 2008, Talley simultaneously issued two CDs in digital download, Journey: The Second Voyage, the remaining songs for the original live Journey recordings, supplemented with five new songs, and Heartsong, an album of fifteen new songs and a re-recording of his song "She's The One," which was covered as "Evening Rain" by Moby.

== Discography(selective) ==
=== Singles ===
- "Are They Gonna Make Us Outlaws Again" / "Forty Hours" – Capitol 4297 – 1976
- "Alabama Summertime" / "When The Fiddler Packs His Case" – Capitol 4410 – 1977
- "Are They Gonna Make Us Outlaws Again" / "Whiskey On The Side" – Oak, Curb JT 37212 – 1982
- Grand Coulee Dam
- W. Lee O'Daniel and the Light Crusty Doughboys

=== Albums ===
- Got No Bread, No Milk, No Money, But We Sure Got a Lot of Love – Original on Capitol Records 1975, (Torreon Productions) – 30th Anniversary Reissue in 2006 on Cimarron Records, Issue No. 1001
- Tryin' Like the Devil – Original Capitol Records-(Torreon Productions) – 1976; Cimarron Recordings Issue No. 1002
- Blackjack Choir – Original Capitol Records-(Torreon Productions) – 1977; Cimarron Recordings Issue No. 1003
- Ain't It Somethin' – Original Capitol Records-(Torreon Productions) – 1977; Cimarron Recordings Issue No. 1004
- American Originals – (Torreon Productions) – 1985; Originally released without license by Bear Family Records, Germany; Cimarron Records Issue No. 1005
- Love Songs and The Blues – (Torreon Productions) – 1989; Originally released without license by Bear Family Records, Germany; Cimarron Records Issue No. 1006
- The Road to Torreón – (Torreon Productions) – 1992; Originally released without license by Bear Family Records, Germany; Cimarron Records Issue No. 1007
- James Talley: Live – (Torreon Productions) – 1994; Originally released without license by Bear Family Records, Germany; Cimarron Records Issue No. 1008
- Woody Guthrie and Songs of My Oklahoma Home – (Torreon Productions) – 1999; Cimarron Records Issue No. 1009
- Nashville City Blues – (Torreon Productions) – 2000; Cimarron Records Issue No. 1010
- Touchstones – (Torreon Productions) – 2002; Cimarron Records Issue No. 1011
- Journey – (Torreon Productions) – 2004; Cimarron Records Issue No. 1012
- Journey: The Second Journey (Torreon Productions) 2008; Cimarron Records Issue No. 1013
- Heartsong – (Torreon Productions) 2008; Cimarron Records Issue No. 1014
