= High Voltage (Count Basie album) =

Studio album by Count Basie and His Orchestra
- Released: 1970
- Recorded: January 23–25, 1970
- Studio: A & R (New York)
- Genre: Jazz
- Length: 34:19
- Label: MPS; MPS 15 285
- Producer: Sonny Lester

Count Basie chronology
| Basie on the Beatles (1969) | High Voltage (1970) | Good Time Blues (1970) |

High Voltage (subtitled Basic Basie Vol. 2) is an album by pianist and bandleader Count Basie featuring performances recorded in 1970 and released on the MPS label.

== Reception ==
Professional ratings
Review scores
| Source | Rating |
|---|---|
| AllMusic | 4/5 stars |

AllMusic awarded the album 4 stars and notes "A dozen generally excellent standards are given overly brief interpretations by the Count Basie Orchestra".

== Track listing ==
1. "Chicago" (Fred Fisher) - 2:47
2. "Have You Met Miss Jones?" (Richard Rodgers, Lorenz Hart) - 2:43
3. "The Lady Is a Tramp" (Rogers, Hart) - 2:53
4. "I'm Getting Sentimental Over You" (George Bassman, Ned Washington) - 2:47
5. "Bewitched" (Rogers, Hart) - 4:01
6. "Day In, Day Out" (Rube Bloom, Johnny Mercer) - 2:34
7. "Get Me to the Church on Time" (Frederick Loewe, Alan Jay Lerner) - 2:14
8. "When Sunny Gets Blue"(Marvin Fisher, Jack Segal) - 3:38
9. "On the Sunny Side of the Street" (Jimmy McHugh, Dorothy Fields) - 2:15
10. "Together" (DeSylva-Brown-Henderson) - 3:09
11. "If I Were a Bell" (Frank Loesser) - 3:07
12. "I Didn't Know What Time It Was" (Rogers, Hart) - 2:11

== Personnel ==
- Count Basie - piano
- Sonny Cohn, Gene Goe, Joe Newman, Waymon Reed - trumpet
- Frank Hooks, Grover Mitchell, Buddy Morrow - trombone
- Bill Hughes - bass trombone
- Bill Adkins, Jerry Dodgion - alto saxophone
- Eric Dixon - tenor saxophone, flute
- Eddie "Lockjaw" Davis - tenor saxophone
- Cecil Payne - baritone saxophone
- Freddie Green - guitar
- George Duvivier - bass
- Harold Jones - drums
- Chico O'Farrill - arranger
