= Monkey Joe =

American country blues pianist and singer (1906–1967)

- Born: Jesse L. Coleman; January 26, 1906; Shelby County, Tennessee, U.S.
- Died: November 16, 1967 (aged 61) Chicago, Illinois, U.S.
- Genres: Country blues
- Occupation: Musician
- Instruments: Vocals; Piano
- Years active: 1930s–1960s

Jesse "Monkey Joe" Coleman (January 26, 1906 – November 16, 1967) was an American country blues pianist and singer, who recorded sporadically from the 1930s into the 1970s.

Coleman was born in Shelby County, Tennessee. He worked locally in Jackson, Mississippi, in juke joints in the 1930s, and recorded with Little Brother Montgomery in 1935 on Bluebird Records. He began using the moniker "Monkey Joe" during that decade. Late in the 1930s he worked as a session musician for Lester Melrose, and recorded under his own name with Charlie McCoy, Fred Williams, Big Bill Broonzy, and Buster Bennett as backing musicians. Coleman also appears to have worked under several other names, such as "Jack Newman" at Vocalion Records and "George Jefferson" as an accompanist on recordings for Lulu Scott. He also recorded on Okeh Records for a time.

Little is known of Coleman's whereabouts, aside from recording credits, from before the 1960s. He worked often in Chicago blues clubs in the 1960s, and he became the subject of some interest due to the blues revival in the late 1960s and early 1970s. He worked again with Little Brother Montgomery in the 1970s on an album entitled Crescent City Blues.

Document Records released a two-volume CD set of Monkey Joe's works in 1996.

In 2022 the Killer Blues Headstone Project placed the headstone for Jesse Coleman at the Washington Memory Gardens in Homewood, Illinois.
