= This Must Be the Plas =

Studio album by Plas Johnson
- Released: November 1959
- Recorded: March 11, 13 and 23, 1959
- Studio: Capitol (Hollywood)
- Genre: Jazz
- Label: Capitol T1281

Plas Johnson chronology
Rockin' with Plas (1957)	This Must Be the Plas (1959)	Mood for the Blues (1960)

This Must Be the Plas is a 1959 album by saxophonist Plas Johnson.

== Reception ==
Professional ratings
Review scores
Source	Rating
Allmusic	3/5 stars
DownBeat	2/5 stars

The initial Billboard magazine review from November 30, 1959, chose the album as one of its "Special Merit Spotlights" and commented that "Eye-catching photo of curvaceous red-head gives package solid display value. Johnson's tasteful, warm sax solo work is heard to advantage on a group of oldies...Spinnable wax for jazz jocks and hip pop deejays".

== Track listing ==
1. "Too Close for Comfort" (Jerry Bock, George David Weiss, Larry Holofcener)
2. "I Hadn't Anyone Till You" (Ray Noble)
3. "Heart and Soul" (Hoagy Carmichael, Frank Loesser)
4. "Poor Butterfly" (Raymond Hubbell, John Golden)
5. "Memories of You" (Andy Razaf, Eubie Blake)
6. "Just One of Those Things" (Cole Porter)
7. "There Is No Greater Love" (Isham Jones, Marty Symes)
8. "If I Had You" (Irving King, Ted Shapiro)
9. "My Silent Love" (Edward Heyman, Dana Suesse)
10. "Day In-Day Out" (Rube Bloom, Johnny Mercer)
11. "My Old Flame" (Sam Coslow, Arthur Johnson)
12. "S'il vous plait" (John Lewis)

== Personnel ==
- Plas Johnson – tenor saxophone, alto saxophone, baritone saxophone
- Larry Bunker, Gene Estes, Victor Feldman – vibraphone
- Paul Smith – piano
- Ernie Freeman – Hammond B-3 organ
- Howard Roberts, Bill Pitman – guitar
- Red Callender – double bass
- Earl Palmer – drums
