= Mood for the Blues =

Studio album by Plas Johnson
- Released: 1960
- Recorded: May 18, June 21 and 27, 1960
- Studio: Capitol (Hollywood)
- Genre: Jazz
- Label: Capitol T1503

Plas Johnson chronology
This Must Be the Plas (1959)	Mood for the Blues (1960)	The Blues (1975)

Mood for the Blues is a 1960 album by saxophonist Plas Johnson.

== Reception ==
The initial Billboard magazine review from February 6, 1961 commenting that "The indomitable tenor stylist performs in front of a full bank of strings and with a robust rhythm section on this set of lushy blues standards."

== Track listing ==
1. "Don't Let the Sun Catch You Cryin'" (Joe Greene)
2. "One Mint Julep" (Rudy Toombs)
3. "How Long Has This Been Going On?" (George Gershwin, Ira Gershwin)
4. "Blues In My Heart" (Benny Carter, Irving Mills)
5. "I've Got a Right to Cry"
6. "Please Send Me Someone to Love" (Percy Mayfield)
7. "Tanya"
8. "Fool That I Am"
9. "Chloe"
10. "Since I Fell for You" (Buddy Johnson)
11. "A Mood for the Blues"
12. "I Wanna Be Loved" (Johnny Green, Edward Heyman, Billy Rose)

== Personnel ==
- Plas Johnson – tenor saxophone
- Ray Johnson – piano
- Ernie Freeman – Hammond B-3 organ
- Rene Hall, Bill Pitman – guitar
- Red Callender – double bass
- Earl Palmer – drums
- Unknown strings
- Gerald Wilson, René Hall – arranger
