= Tryin' Like the Devil =

Tryin' Like The Devil

Studio album by James Talley
- Released: 1976
- Recorded: 1976
- Studio: Jack Clement Recording (Nashville, Tennessee)
- Genre: Country
- Length: 34:46
- Label: Capitol
- Producer: James Talley / Steve Mendell

James Talley chronology
| Got No Bread, No Milk, No Money, But We Sure Got a Lot of Love (1975) | Tryin' Like The Devil (1976) | Blackjack Choir (1977) |

Professional ratings
Review scores
| Source | Rating |
|---|---|
| Allmusic | link |
| Christgau's Record Guide | A− |

Tryin' Like The Devil is the second album by the country singer-songwriter James Talley. It was recorded at Jack Clement Recording Studio B in Nashville, Tennessee.

== Critical reception ==
Reviewing in Christgau's Record Guide: Rock Albums of the Seventies (1981), Robert Christgau wrote: "Something about this record as a whole is slightly off—maybe it's Talley's humorlessness, or maybe it's that his voice is much better suited to the startling talky intimacy of his first record than to the belting bravado with which he asserts his ambitions this time. But every song works individually, and an audacious concept—returning a consciously leftish analysis to the right-leaning populism of country music—is damn near realized in utterly idiomatic songs like '40 Hours' and 'Are They Gonna Make Us Outlaws Again?' It belts good enough."

== Track listing ==
1. "Forty Hours" (Talley) – 3:05
2. "Deep Country Blues" (Talley) – 4:30
3. "Give My Love to Marie" (Talley) – 3:43
4. "Are They Gonna Make Us Outlaws Again" (Talley) – 3:18
5. "She Tries Not to Cry" (Talley) – 4:11
6. "Tryin' Like The Devil" (Talley) – 2:21
7. "She's the One" (Talley) – 4:17
8. "Sometimes I Think About Suzanne" (Talley) – 3:29
9. "Nuthin' But the Blues" (Talley) – 3:07
10. "You Can't Ever Tell" (Talley) – 2:45

== Personnel ==
- James Talley – Acoustic Guitar, Lead Vocals
- Doyle Grisham – Steel Guitar, Electric Guitar, Acoustic Guitar, Dobro
- Johnny Gimble – Fiddle, Mandolin
- Josh Graves – Dobro
- Charlie McCoy – Harmonica
- Steve Blailock – Electric Guitar, Acoustic Guitar
- Jerry Shook – Acoustic Guitar, Harmonica
- Rick Durrett – Piano, Electric Piano
- Steve Mendell – Bass, Background Vocals
- Mike Leech – Bass
- Karl Himmel – Drums, Percussion
- Chris Laird – Drums
- Dave Gillon – Acoustic Guitar
- Steve Gillon – Background Vocals
- John Bell – Background Vocals
- Steve Mendell – Background Vocals
- Jim Rooney – Background Vocals

== Production ==
- Producer: James Talley/Stephen Mendell
- Recording/Mixing Engineer: Lee Hazen/Jim Williamson
- Mastering: Jay Maynard
- Photography: Clark Thomas
- Art Direction: Roy Kohara
