= Mason Proffit =

American country rock band

- Origin: Indianapolis, Indiana, U.S.
- Genres: Folk rock, country rock
- Years active: 1969–1973
- Labels: Happy Tiger, Ampex, Warner
- Past members: Terry Talbot; John Michael Talbot; Tim Ayers; Art Nash; Ron Schuetter; Bruce Kurnow; Bill Cunningham

Mason Proffit was an American country rock band from Indianapolis, Indiana, that released five albums between 1969 and 1973. They are known for their song "Two Hangmen", which garnered a significant amount of Album Oriented Rock airplay.

== History ==
John Michael Talbot at Coe College in 1971

Brothers Terry Talbot and John Michael Talbot played together in several local bands around Indianapolis, Indiana and later in Chicago. After their group Sounds Unlimited disbanded, in 1969 they formed Mason Proffit with a focus on the emerging blend of folk, country and rock that would come to be called country rock.

"Two Hangmen", written by the older brother, Terry, was released on their first album, Wanted, and became a regional hit. This helped their second Happy Tiger album, Movin' Toward Happiness, chart on the Billboard 200. Wanted was nominated for Best Album Cover for the 1971 Grammy Awards, and was mistakenly listed under the title Mason Proffit. In 1972, the band signed to Warner Bros. Records and continued touring, performing up to 300 concerts each year. Some of Mason Proffit's opening acts during that time included The Doobie Brothers, Steely Dan, John Denver, and Mac Davis. Their country-rock-bluegrass style was innovative yet difficult to place in a marketing genre. Their live shows were high-energy. Earl Scruggs once called John Talbot "the best banjo player I've ever heard." The Talbot brothers opened for the Eagles on a national tour.

In June of 1973, Mason Profitt opened for Aerosmith at Canobie Lake Park for WRKO Night, a night of free rides and a concert.

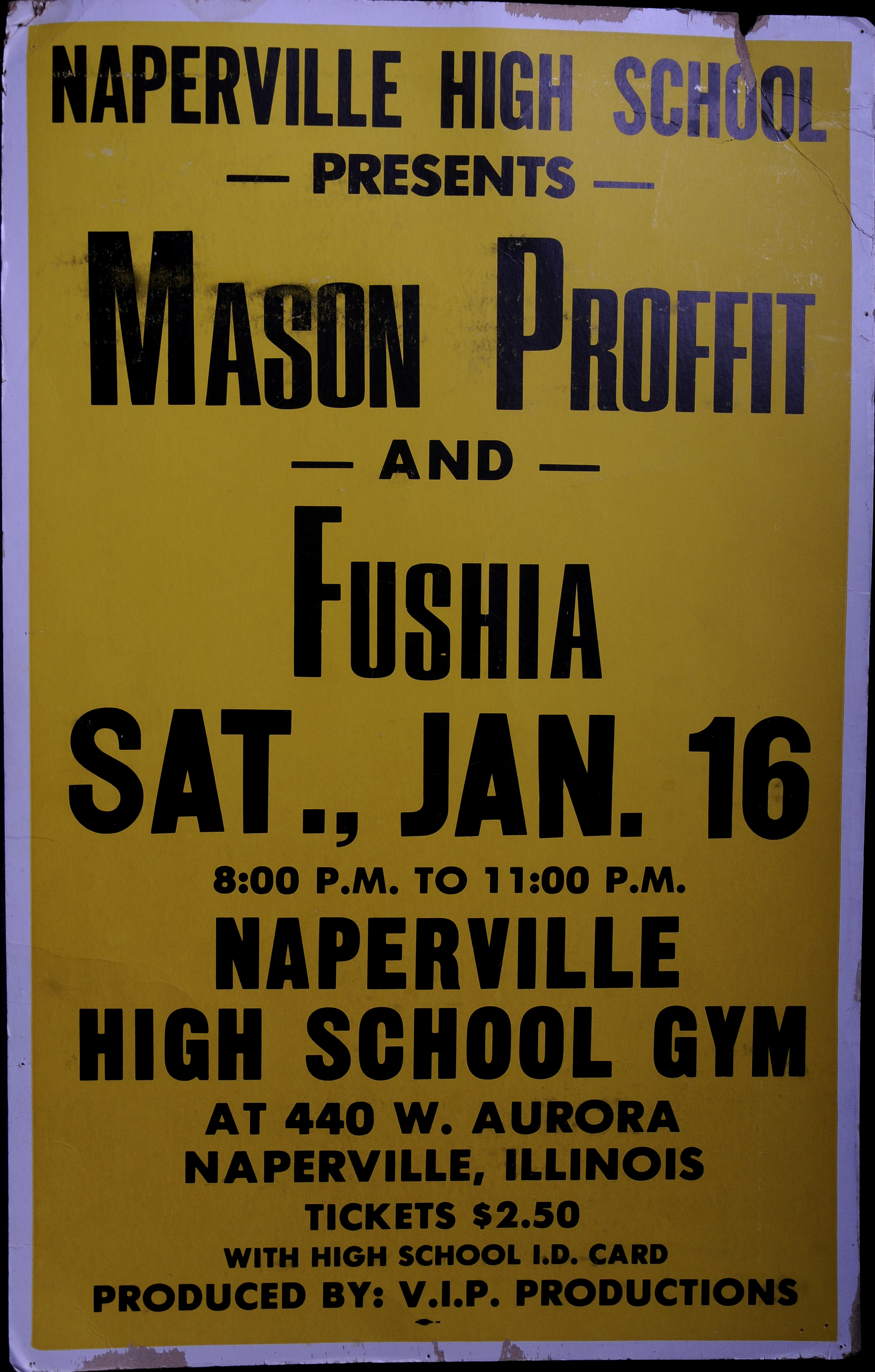
Rock poster, circa 1971

Warner Bros. re-released their first two albums as a compilation, Come & Gone which garnered a Grammy for best album package in 1974. It also released Rockfish Crossing and Bareback Rider. Mason Proffit disbanded when brothers John and Terry Talbot left the band and began performing as a duo. Warner then released The Talbot Bros., the first of three duo albums with the remaining two released on Sparrow Records. Sparrow eventually re-issued the first Talbot Bros. album, minus the track "Moline Truckin". After the break-up, the Talbot brothers began to record contemporary Christian music on Sparrow Records, earning themselves a Grammy Award nomination and several Dove Award nominations.

== Discography ==
Year	Title	Chart Position	Label	Number
1969	Wanted		Happy Tiger	1009
1971	Movin' Toward Happiness	177	Happy Tiger	1019
1971	Last Night I Had the Strangest Dream	186	Ampex	A-10138
1972	Rockfish Crossing	211	Warner Bros.	BS-2657
1973	Bare Back Rider	198	Warner Bros.	BS-2704
1973	Come & Gone *	203	Warner Bros.	2S-2746
2005	Still Hangin'		Mason Proffit	

* double album reissue of Wanted and Movin' Toward Happiness
