= Buster Bennett =

American blues saxophonist and blues shouter (1914–1980)

- Born: James Joseph Bennett; March 19, 1914; Pensacola, Florida, U.S.
- Died: July 3, 1980 (aged 66) Houston, Texas, U.S.
- Genre: Blues
- Occupation: Musician
- Instruments: Vocals; saxophone; piano; string bass
- Years active: 1930s–1956

James Joseph "Buster" Bennett (March 19, 1914 – July 3, 1980) was an American blues saxophonist and blues shouter. His nickname was "Leap Frog". At various times in his career, he played the soprano, alto, and tenor saxophone. He was known for his gutbucket style on the saxophone. He also played the piano and the string bass professionally.

== Biography ==
Bennett was born in Pensacola, Florida. By 1930 or so, he was working in Texas, but he spent most of his active career (1938 to 1954) in Chicago. He was employed as a session musician by Lester Melrose from 1938 to 1942; he played on recordings with Big Bill Broonzy, the Yas Yas Girl, Monkey Joe, and Washboard Sam. Concomitantly he played on sessions with Jimmie Gordon under the direction of Sammy Price.

In 1944, the Buster Bennett Trio featured Arrington Thornton on piano and Duke Groner on bass. Other lineups led by Bennett included Wild Bill Davis, Israel Crosby, and Pee Wee Jackson.

In 1945, Bennett signed a three-year recording contract with Columbia Records; he was marketed as a Louis Jordan sound-alike. In early 1946, while under contract to Columbia, Bennett appeared, under the name of his trumpet player, Charles Gray, on a recording for the short-lived Chicago label Rhumboogie. He also made an unannounced appearance on a Red Saunders session for Sultan Records in 1946 and on a "tenor battle" session with Tom Archia for Aristocrat Records in 1947.

At the height of his popularity, in the late 1940s, he was known for his ability to draw customers into a South Side club—and for his cantankerous personality. On one occasion, he and Preston Jackson got into a fistfight at the Musicians Union hall, over a $2 debt.

Bennett recorded his last session for Columbia in December 1947. By 1956 he was out of music, because of the loss of recording opportunities and his failing health. He retired to Texas, where he lived out the remainder of his life. He died in Houston in 1980, at the age of 66.
