= Priscilla Paris =

American singer (1945–2004)

- Born: January 4, 1945
- Died: March 5, 2004 (aged 59) Paris, France
- Genres: Pop; Jazz
- Occupations: Singer; Songwriter
- Instrument: Vocals
- Labels: York; Happy Tiger; Out Of Town

Priscilla Paris (January 4, 1945 – March 5, 2004) was an American singer and songwriter. She had two sons, Edan and Seth.

Backed by her two older Paris Sisters, Albeth and Sherrell, Priscilla Paris is best remembered for the song, "I Love How You Love Me", an international hit in October 1961. She died unexpectedly in Paris, France, while at home.

== Discography ==
- Priscilla Sings Herself (1967) York Records
- Priscilla Loves Billy (1969) Happy Tiger Records
- Love Is (1978) Out Of Town Records
- Love, Priscilla - Her 1960s Solo Recordings (2012) Ace Records
