= Got No Bread, No Milk, No Money, But We Sure Got a Lot of Love =

Album by James Talley

Studio album by James Talley
- Released: 1975
- Recorded: 1973
- Genre: Western swing
- Length: 32:44
- Label: Capitol

James Talley chronology
Got No Bread, No Milk, No Money, But We Sure Got a Lot of Love (1975)	Tryin' Like The Devil (1976)

Professional ratings
Review scores
Source	Rating
AllMusic	4/5 stars
Christgau's Record Guide	A

Got No Bread, No Milk, No Money, But We Sure Got a Lot of Love is the debut album by the country singer-songwriter James Talley. It was recorded in 1973 at Hound's Ear Studios in Nashville, Tennessee.

== Critical reception ==
Reviewing in Christgau's Record Guide: Rock Albums of the Seventies (1981), Robert Christgau wrote: "The most attractive thing about this homespun Western-swing masterpiece—infusing both its sure, unassuming intelligence and its plain and lovely songs—is a mildness reminiscent of the first recorded string bands. Talley's careful conception and production both work to revive a playing-pretty-for-our-friends feel that most folkies would give up their rent-controlled apartments for. Despite its intense rootedness, it's neither defensive nor preachy—just lays down a way of life for all to hear."

== Track listing ==
1. "W.Lee O'Daniel and the Light Crust Doughboys" (Talley) – 2:47
2. "Got No Bread, No Milk, No Money, But We Sure Got a Lot of Love" (Talley) – 2:11
3. "Red River Memory" (Talley) – 3:25
4. "Give Him Another Bottle" (Talley) – 2:00
5. "Calico Gypsy" (Talley) – 2:53
6. "To Get Back Home" (Talley) – 2:20
7. "Big Taters in the Sandy Land" (Johnny Gimble) – 1:36
8. "No Opener Needed" (Talley) – 3:11
9. "Blue-Eyed Ruth and My Sunday Suit" (Talley) – 1:54
10. "Mehan, Oklahoma" (Talley) – 2:41
11. "Daddy's Song" (Talley) – 1:34
12. "Take Me to the Country" (Talley) – 3:53
13. "Red River Reprise" (Talley) – 2:13

== Personnel ==
- James Talley – Acoustic Guitar, Lead Vocals
- Doyle Grisham – Steel Guitar, Acoustic Guitar, Electric Guitar, Dobro
- Jerry McKuen – Electric Guitar, Acoustic Guitar, Mandolin
- Johnny Gimble – Fiddle, Mandolin
- Rick Durrett – Organ, Piano, Accordion
- Steve Hostak – Electric Guitar
- Steve Mendell – Bass
- Wayne Secrest – Bass
- Lisa Silver – Fiddle
- Ralph Childs – Tuba
- Karl Himmel – Drums
- Gregg Thomas – Drums
- Dave Poe – Clarinet
- Tommy Smith – Trumpet
- Michael Martin – Spoons
- Johnny Bell – Background Vocals
- Dave Gillon – Background Vocals
- Tony Lyons – Background Vocals

== Production ==
- Producer: James Talley
- Recording Engineer: Richie Cicero/Lee Hazen/Tony Lyons
- Photography: Clark Thomas
- Liner Notes: Chet Flippo
