= Lin Biviano =

American jazz musician

Franklin "Lin" Biviano is an American jazz trumpeter best known for his powerful lead trumpet playing with Buddy Rich, Count Basie, and Maynard Ferguson. He has also played and recorded with Hoagy Carmichael, Jo Ann Castle, Bill Chase, Buddy DeFranco, Jimmy Dorsey, Ella Fitzgerald, Woody Herman, Milt Jackson, Harry James, Stan Kenton, Glenn Miller, Frank Sinatra, Steve Smith, Mel Tormé, Sarah Vaughan, Fats Waller, and Lawrence Welk, mostly playing lead trumpet. From 1974 to 1976 he led his own big band; they toured the East Coast and recorded the single L.A. Expression with Love Is Stronger Far Than We on the flipside. From 1964 to 1965, he attended Berklee School of Music (now Berklee College of Music), and in 2002 he was asked to return as a teacher; as of 2017 he was still on the faculty, teaching mainly ensembles and private lessons.

== Discography ==
With Buddy Rich

- A Different Drummer (RCA, 1971)
- Rich in London (RCA, 1971)
- Stick It (RCA, 1972)

With Maynard Ferguson

- M.F. Horn 4 & 5 - Live at Jimmy's (Columbia, 1973)
- Live at the Great American Music Hall (Status, 1973)

With Stan Kenton

- Live at the London Hilton, 1973 (Status, 1973)

With Count Basie

- Prime Time (Pablo, 1977)
- Montreux '77 (Pablo, 1977)
- Basie in Europe (LRC, 1977)
- Milt Jackson + Count Basie + The Big Band (Pablo, 1978)

With Woody Herman

- Road Father (Century, 1978)

With Buddy DeFranco

- Born to Swing (Hindsight, 1988)
