= Happy Tiger Records =

Independent American record label

- Parent company: Flying Tigers
- Founded: 1969
- Defunct: 1990
- Status: Defunct
- Distributor: Era Records
- Genre: Pop, rock, country, jazz
- Country of origin: U.S.
- Location: Century City, Los Angeles, California

Happy Tiger Records was an independent American record label that was owned by the Flying Tiger Line air freight company. Happy Tiger operated from 1969 to 1971. During this time the label produced more than two dozen albums by Count Basie, Mason Proffit, Red Rhodes, Priscilla Paris, Paul Kelly, and the Anita Kerr Singers. The label released two albums by the post-Van Morrison Them band.

== History ==
Happy Tiger's offices were located at 1801 Avenue of the Stars in Century City, Los Angeles, California. The staff included engineer and producer Ray Ruff, who had previously worked for ABC-Paramount Records. During its short existence Happy Tiger issued twenty-seven albums and more than eighty singles, all distributed by Era Records. The label also issued eight albums of oldies under the joint Happy Tiger/Era label, including works by Phil Baugh, Dorsey Burnette, and some early Beach Boys recordings. They also recorded singles by such veteran performers as Kay Starr, Roberta Sherwood, and Joanie Sommers. By the end of October 1971, Happy Tiger's national promo chief, Dave Chackler had left to join Ray Ruff's record label Oak as its vice-president and man in charge of promotion merchandising. Happy Tiger's final album in 1971 was Mason Proffit's Movin' Toward Happiness. The label's final single in 1972 was Richard Berry performing a song he had written and which the Kingsmen had made famous in 1963, "Louie Louie." After Happy Tiger folded, Warner Bros. Records reissued Paul Kelly's Stealin' in the Name of the Lord in 1972, retitled Dirt. Warner also reissued the two Mason Proffit albums as a double LP, Come and Gone, in 1974.

== Notable artists ==
- Count Basie
- Richard Berry
- Donnie Brooks
- Gib Guilbeau
- Paul Kelly
- Anita Kerr Singers
- Baker Knight
- Priscilla Paris
- Keith Green
- Dan Penn
- Mason Proffit
- Red Rhodes
- Roberta Sherwood
- Joanie Sommers
- Kay Starr
- Them

== Discography ==
Year	Artist	Title	Number	Chart	Peak
1969	Buddy Bohn	Places	HTR-1001		
1969	Priscilla Paris	Priscilla Loves Billy	HTR-1002		
1969	Red Rhodes and The Detours	Red Rhodes Live at the Palamino	HTR-1003		
1969	Them	Them	HTR-1004		
1969	Dan Terry	Lonely Place	HTR-1005		
1970	The Kimberlys	Kimberlys	HTR-1006		
1970	Count Basie	Basie on the Beatles	HTR-1007		
1970	Ecology	Environment/Evolution/Ecology	HTR-1008		
1970	Mason Proffit	Wanted	HTR-1009		
1970	Aorta	Aorta 2	HTR-1010		
1971	Hal Rugg	Hal Rugg Steels the Hits of Loretta Lynn	HTR-1011		
1971	Them	Them in Reality	HTR-1012		
1971	The Kimberlys	New Horizon	HTR-1014		
1971	Paul Kelly	Stealin' in the Name of the Lord	HTR-1015	Billboard Pop Singles	49
1971	Anita Kerr Singers	A Tribute to Simon and Garfunkel	HTR-1016		
1971	Various	Early Chicago, Volume 1	HTR-1017		
1971	Buffalo Nickel Jug Band	Buffalo Nickel Jug Band	HTR-1018		
1971	Mason Proffit	Movin' Toward Happiness	HTR-1019	Billboard Pop Albums	177

== See also ==
- Era Records
- List of record labels
