= Soul Ballet =

Soul Ballet is a musical project of actor, producer, arranger, programmer, and multi-instrumentalist Rick Kelly.

Soul Ballet's music is styled around contemporary smooth jazz/electronica. Soul Ballet is occasionally joined by a live rhythm section, as well as a series of guest vocalists, including Stefani Montiel, Annika, and Billy Valentine.

== Discography ==
- Soul Ballet (November 5, 1996 Countdown)
- Trip The Night Fantastic (June 23, 1998 Countdown)
- "City Of Desire (1999 Countdown)
- Vibe Cinema (February 22, 2000 Countdown Records)
- Dial It In (February 26, 2002 Gold Circle Records)
- dream BEAT dream (August 10, 2004 215 Records)
- All The Pretty Lights Vol. 1 (June 7, 2005 215 Records)
- Lavish (September 11, 2007 Artizen)
- 2019 (August 4, 2009, NuGroove Records)

=== Compilation appearances ===
- New Age Music & New Sounds Vol. 67 – "Liberty"
