= Plas Johnson =

American jazz saxophonist (1931–2026)

Background information
- Also known as: Johnny Beecher
- Born: Plas John Johnson, Jr. July 21, 1931; Donaldsonville, Louisiana, U.S.
- Died: July 15, 2026 (aged 94) Granada Hills, Los Angeles, U.S.
- Genre: Jazz
- Occupation: Musician
- Instruments: Saxophone; flute; clarinet
- Formerly of: The Wrecking Crew

Plas John Johnson Jr. (/plæz/) (July 21, 1931 – July 15, 2026) was an American soul-jazz and hard bop tenor saxophonist, probably most widely known as the tenor saxophone soloist on Henry Mancini’s "The Pink Panther Theme". He also performed on alto and baritone sax as well as flute and clarinet.

== Life and career ==
Plas John Johnson Jr. was born in Donaldsonville, Louisiana, United States on July 21, 1931. He sang with his family's group until his saxophonist father bought him a soprano saxophone. Largely self-taught, he soon began playing alto and later tenor saxophone. He and his pianist brother Ray first recorded as the Johnson Brothers in New Orleans in the late 1940s. He first toured with R&B singer Charles Brown in 1951. After serving in the U.S. Army during the Korean War, he and his brother moved to Los Angeles in 1954, and he soon began session recordings as a full-time musician, backing artists such as B.B. King and Johnny Otis as well as scores of other R&B performers. An early supporter was Maxwell Davis, who hired him to take over his own parts so that he could concentrate on producing sessions for the Modern record label.

Recruited by Johnny Otis and executive Dave Cavanaugh for Capitol Records in the mid-1950s, Johnson also played on innumerable records by Peggy Lee, Nat "King" Cole, Glen Gray, Frank Sinatra, and others. He remained a leading session player for almost twenty years, averaging two sessions a day and playing everything from movie soundtracks and Les Baxter's exotica albums, to rock and roll singles by many artists including Duane Eddy, Ricky Nelson, and Bobby Vee, and R&B records performers including Larry Williams, Bobby Day, and Richard Berry. He played on many of the Beach Boys’ records, and was an integral part of a number of instrumental groups that existed in name only, such as B. Bumble and the Stingers and The Marketts. He is featured in the 2008 documentary The Wrecking Crew regarding his experience in LA studios at the time. Unlike many session musicians of the time he became known by name, but for a time also recorded under the pseudonym Johnny Beecher for the budget CRC Charter label to avoid contractual disputes.

In the late 1950s and early 1960s, he was a regular member of Henry Mancini's studio orchestra and in 1963 he recorded "The Pink Panther Theme", written by Mancini with Johnson in mind. Johnson said of the recording: "We only did two takes, I think... When we finished, everyone applauded -- even the string players. And that's saying something... They never applaud for anything."

In 1969, T-Bone Walker introduced Harmonica Slim to the record producer Bob Thiele. Thiele utilised a company of jazz and R&B musicians including Johnson, to work with Harmonica Slim on his debut album.

He joined the studio band for the Merv Griffin Show in 1970, and also played with a number of jazz and swing bands of the period. He joined Lincoln Mayorga in creating direct-to-disc recordings for Sheffield Labs. He later recorded for the Concord label, worked with the Capp-Pierce Juggernaut, and toured in 1990 with the Gene Harris Superband. He has performed at numerous jazz festivals.

Plas Johnson died in Granada Hills, California, on July 15, 2026, six days shy of his 95th birthday.

== Discography ==
=== As leader/co-leader ===
- Plas Johnson [also released as Drum Stuff] (Tampa, 1956)
- Downstairs, (A-side), The Loop, (B-side), (Capitol Records, 45-30564). Promotional Record Number: 4251.
- Rockin' with Plas: The Capitol Singles (Capitol, 1957–59 [1982])
- This Must Be the Plas (Capitol, 1959)
- Mood for the Blues (Capitol, 1961)
- The Blues (Concord Jazz, 1975)
- Positively (Concord Jazz, 1976)
- L.A. '55 with the Grease Patrol (Carell Music, 1983)
- On the Trail! with Totti Bergh (Gemini, 1991 [1993])
- Hot, Blue and Saxy (Carell Music, 1992)
- Evening Delight (Carell Music, 1999)
- Christmas in Hollywood with Ernie Andrews (Carell Music, 2000)
- Keep That Groove Going! with Red Holloway (Milestone, 2001)
- All Blues with Ernie Watts (Mojo [Japan], 2008)

==== As Johnny Beecher ====
- Sax 5th Ave. (CRC Charter, 1962)
- On the Scene (CRC Charter, 1963)

=== As sideman ===
With Ray Anthony

- Like Wild! (Capitol, 1960)

With Chet Baker

- Blood, Chet and Tears (Verve, 1970)

With Les Baxter

- Jungle Jazz (Capitol, 1958)

With Benny Carter

- Aspects (United Artists, 1959)

With Ry Cooder

- Paradise and Lunch (Reprise, 1974)

With Sam Cooke

- Twistin' the Night Away (RCA, 1962)
- Mr. Soul (RCA, 1963)
- Ain't That Good News (RCA, 1964)

With Rita Coolidge

- Rita Coolidge (A&M, 1971)

With Clifford Coulter

- Do It Now! (Impulse!, 1971)

With Bobby Darin

- Venice Blue (Capitol, 1965)

With Nick DeCaro

- Italian Graffiti (Blue Thumb, 1974)

With Neil Diamond

- The Christmas Album (Columbia, 1992)

With Dr. John

- Gris-Gris (Atco, 1968)

With Ella Fitzgerald

- Ella Fitzgerald Sings the Harold Arlen Songbook (Verve, 1961)
- Ella Fitzgerald Sings the Jerome Kern Song Book (Verve, 1963)
- Ella Fitzgerald Sings the Johnny Mercer Song Book (Verve, 1964)

With Marvin Gaye

- Let's Get It On (Motown, 1973)

With The Gene Harris All Star Big Band

- Tribute to Count Basie (Concord Jazz, 1988)

With Etta James

- Deep in the Night (Warner Bros., 1978)

With Elton John

- Duets (MCA, 1993)

With B.B. King

- Blues in My Heart (Crown, 1963)
- L.A. Midnight (ABC, 1972)
- Live at the Apollo (MCA, 1991)

With Carole King

- Music (Ode, 1971)
- Speeding Time (Atlantic, 1983)

With Nicolette Larson

- Nicolette (Warner Bros., 1978)

With Peggy Lee

- Blues Cross Country (Capitol, 1962)
- A Natural Woman (Capitol, 1969)

With Henry Mancini

- The Music from Peter Gunn (RCA, 1958)
- More Music from Peter Gunn (RCA, 1959)
- Uniquely Mancini (RCA, 1963)
- The Pink Panther (RCA, 1964)
- Mancini '67 (RCA, 1966)
- The Party (RCA, 1968)

With Teena Marie

- Emerald City (Epic, 1986)

With The Marketts

- "Balboa Blue" (Union Records 504, 1962; reissue: Liberty 55443)

With Les McCann

- Les McCann Plays the Hits (Limelight, 1966)
- Bucket o' Grease (Limelight, 1967)

With Bette Midler

- Broken Blossom (Atlantic, 1977)

With Liza Minnelli

- Tropical Nights (Columbia, 1977)

With Joni Mitchell

- Travelogue (Nonesuch, 2002)

With Maria Muldaur

- Waitress in a Donut Shop (Reprise, 1974)
- Sweet Harmony (Reprise, 1976)

With John Neel

- Blue Martini (Ava, 1963)

With Aaron Neville

- Warm Your Heart (A&M, 1991)
- The Grand Tour (A&M, 1993)
- Aaron's Soulful Christmas (A&M, 1993)

With The Platters

- The Great Pretender (Mercury, 1955)

With Minnie Riperton

- Stay in Love (Epic, 1977)

With Johnny Rivers

- New Lovers and Old Friends (Epic, 1975)

With Shorty Rogers

- Gospel Mission (Capitol, 1963)

With Linda Ronstadt

- What's New (Asylum, 1983)
- Lush Life (Asylum, 1984)
- For Sentimental Reasons (Asylum, 1986)
- Winter Light (Elektra, 1993)
- We Ran (Elektra, 1998)

With Pete Rugolo

- 10 Saxophones and 2 Basses (Mercury, 1961)

With Boz Scaggs

- Silk Degrees (Columbia, 1976)

With Lalo Schifrin

- More Mission: Impossible (Paramount, 1968)
- Mannix (Paramount, 1968)

With Rhoda Scott

- From C to Shining C (Doodlin' Records, 2009)

With Steely Dan

- The Royal Scam (ABC, 1976)

With Rod Stewart

- A Night on the Town (Warner Bros., 1976)
- Stardust: The Great American Songbook, Volume III (J Records, 2004)

With Eddie "Cleanhead" Vinson

- The Original Cleanhead (BluesTime, 1970)

With Tom Waits

- Heartattack and Vine (Asylum, 1980)

With Larry Williams

- Heebie Jeebies (1958)

With Deniece Williams

- This Is Niecy (Columbia, 1976)

With the Gerald Wilson Orchestra

- State Street Sweet (MAMA, 1995)
