= Prime Time (Count Basie album) =

Studio album by Count Basie
- Released: 1977
- Recorded: January 18–20, 1977
- Studio: Sun West, Los Angeles
- Genre: Jazz, big band
- Length: 42:24
- Label: Pablo
- Producer: Norman Granz

Count Basie chronology
Basie Jam 3 (1976)	Prime Time (1977)	Kansas City 5 (1977)

Prime Time is an album by the American musician Count Basie, released in 1977. It won the Grammy Award for Best Jazz Performance by a Big Band in 1978.

Professional ratings
Review scores
Source	Rating
AllMusic	4/5 stars
The Encyclopedia of Popular Music	4/5 stars
The Penguin Guide to Jazz Recordings	3/4 stars
The Rolling Stone Jazz Record Guide	3/5 stars

== Track listing ==
All music composed by Sammy Nestico, except where noted.

1. "Prime Time" – 7:33
2. "Bundle O'Funk" – 5:16
3. "Sweet Georgia Brown" (Ben Bernie, Kenneth Casey, Maceo Pinkard) – 3:34
4. "Featherweight" – 4:52
5. "Reachin' Out" – 6:36
6. "Ja-Da" (Bob Carleton) – 5:45
7. "The Great Debate" – 4:48
8. "Ya Gotta Try" – 4:00

== Personnel ==
- Count Basie – piano
- Lin Biviano – trumpet
- Sonny Cohn – trumpet
- Pete Minger – trumpet
- Bobby Mitchell – trumpet
- Curtis Fuller – trombone
- Al Grey – trombone
- Bill Hughes – trombone
- Mel Wanzo – trombone
- Bobby Plater – alto saxophone
- Eric Dixon – tenor saxophone
- Jimmy Forrest – saxophone
- Danny Turner – saxophone
- Charles Fowlkes – baritone saxophone
- Freddie Green – guitar
- John Duke – double bass
- Reinie Press – bass guitar
- Nat Pierce – piano
- Butch Miles – drums
- Sammy Nestico – arranger, conductor
