= Sultan Records =

Sultan Recording Company, headquartered in Detroit, was a short-lived label started c. 1946 by Morton Sultan (1921 - 1983).

Its gimmick was "Double-header hits," meaning that two different artists shared each 78 rpm.

As far as is known only three jazz artists recorded for Sultan: Red Saunders, Eddie Wiggins and Sonny Thompson. The only other known Sultan recording is of songs in Hebrew and Yiddish, recorded in Detroit by a synagogue cantor in 1946.

== Releases ==
=== Series 2500 ===
Its three jazz 78s were recorded in Chicago in June 1946:

- 2501 - Side A: "Orientale" (Wiggins) - Eddie Wiggins Sextette - Musicians: Eddie Wiggins (as -2; ob -1); Gene Russell (p); Red Cody (vib); Frank Gassi (eg); Jack Fonda (b); Steve Varela (d).
- 2501 - Side B: "Red, the Be Bop Guy" ("Red" Saunders and His Band, which included an unannounced guest appearance by Buster Bennett) - Musicians: Red Saunders (d, voc, ldr); George "Sonny" Cohn (tp); Joseph "Buster" Bennett (voc, as -1); Nat Jones (as); Leon Washington (ts); Porter Derrico (p); Mickey Sims (b).
- 2502 - Side A: "South Side Boogie" (Thompson) - Sonny Thompson, Prince of the Ivories.
- 2502 - Side B: "Onyx Jump" (Wiggins) - Eddie Wiggins Sextette.
- 2503 - Side A: "Vi, Tell Me Why" (Dean-Saunders) - "Red" Saunders and His Band.
- 2503 - Side B: "Sonny's Boogie" (Thompson) - Sonny Thompson, Prince of the Ivories.

=== Series 1000 ===
- 1000 - Side A: "Hatikvah"; Side B: "Ich fur Aheim" - Cantor Hyman Adler of Congregation B'nai David in Detroit.

"Hatikvah", sung in Hebrew, would, in two years' time, become the national anthem of Israel, while "Ich fur Aheim" was a Yiddish popular song.

== Critical reviews ==
The two Sonny Thompson sides were reviewed by Metronome in its September 1946 issue: "This is the pianist who came into the Café Society Uptown two months ago. It's said he's potentially great, but since both these sides are just so much fast flashy boogie woogie, with a meaningless pseudo-classical departure, we'll reserve our raves."

Reviewing Saunders' "Red, the Be Bop Guy", Metronome said, "Saunders' little Chicago band does a vocal novelty that sounds more like typical jump music than be bop. It's a medium-tempo blues with a good beat and some tricky alto by Nat Jones. The same Mr. Jones, who played clarinet for the Duke for a while some three years ago, plays a sweet solo on 'Vi,' but the band and performance are out of kilter and perhaps a trifle off center."

The October 1946 issue of Metronome, referring to the Eddie Wiggins sides: "This little band from Chicago, which opened at New York's Aquarium last month, jumps healthily in 'Onyx,' with good solos by alto and vibes and some spirited riffing. Nothing sensational here, but very good for an unknown band of which you expected nothing. 'Orientale' shifts the alto man to oboe for a performance that sounds alarmingly like its title and is a weird mixture of exotic sound effects and jump piano. It gets better as it goes along and turns out to be a fast blues, then back comes that oboe."

== See also ==
- List of record labels
