= Ernie Freeman =

American pianist, arranger and composer (1922–1981)

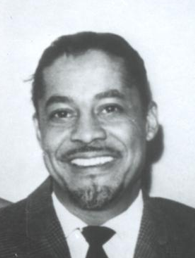
- Freeman in 1975

Background information
- Born: Ernest Aaron Freeman Jr. August 16, 1922; Cleveland, Ohio, U.S.
- Died: May 16, 1981 (aged 58) Los Angeles, California, U.S.
- Genres: Pop, rhythm and blues, jazz, orchestral
- Occupations: Pianist, arranger, bandleader
- Instruments: Piano, organ
- Years active: 1935-1970s

Ernest Aaron Freeman (August 16, 1922 – May 16, 1981) was an American pianist, organist, bandleader, and arranger. He was responsible for arranging many successful rhythm and blues and pop records from the 1950s to the 1970s.

== Birth and family ==
Freeman was born in Cleveland, Ohio. His parents were Ernest Freeman Sr. and Gertrude Freeman (née Richardson). He had a brother, Art Freeman, that was in music and recording and sometimes collaborated with Ernest Freeman. Freeman's wife was Isabelle Freeman (née Collier), who also collaborated with him in some songs. Freeman had a daughter Janis.

== Career ==
In 1935, he began playing in local Cleveland area nightclubs, and also formed a classical music trio for local social functions with his father and his sister Evelyn. Around 1939, he and Evelyn formed a new band, The Evelyn Freeman Swing Band, with fellow teenagers from Cleveland Central High School. Evelyn played piano, while Ernie played saxophone and also began writing arrangements for the band. The band began a regular engagement at the Circle Ballroom in Cleveland, and broadcast shows for WHK radio station. In 1942, most of the band, apart from Evelyn, joined the US Navy together, and became the first all-black Navy Band, called The Gobs of Swing with Ernie as its leader.

After leaving the navy in 1945, Freeman entered the Cleveland Institute of Music, from which he graduated with a BA degree. In 1946 he moved with his family to Los Angeles, to attend the University of Southern California where he received his master's degree in music composition. In Los Angeles, he played in clubs, accompanying Dinah Washington and Dorothy Dandridge among others, as well as recording under his own name for the Mambo label. After a spell as arranger for Woody Herman he joined the Ernie Fields Orchestra, playing the piano. Other members of the band included saxophonists Earl Bostic and Plas Johnson, guitarist René Hall, and drummer Earl Palmer. In 1951 Freeman also began playing with the Billy Hadnott Sextet, but left in 1954 to form his own combo with Johnson, Palmer and guitarist Irving Ashby. In 1955 they released their first record, "No No Baby" on the Middle-Tone label. They also recorded with a vocal group, the Voices, who included Bobby Byrd and Earl Nelson of the Hollywood Flames (later Bob & Earl).

Freeman played on numerous early rock and R&B sessions in Los Angeles, California, in the 1950s, particularly on the Specialty, Modern, and Aladdin labels, as well as for white artists such as Duane Eddy and Bobby Vee. He played piano on the Platters' "The Great Pretender" in 1955, and began releasing a number of instrumental records of his own, at first on Cash Records. These included "Jivin' Around" (No. 5 on the R&B chart in 1956). In 1956 the Ernie Freeman Combo and the Platters appeared in Columbia Pictures' Rock Around The Clock introduced by Alan Freed. In the same year he was signed by Imperial Records, where he released 29 singles and seven LPs over the next seven years. His first single for the label was "Lost Dreams", which reached No. 7 on the R&B chart. His cover version of Bill Justis' "Raunchy", his biggest solo success, reached No. 4 on the pop chart and No. 1 on the R&B chart in 1957. He returned to the charts in 1958, when his version of "Indian Love Call" reached No. 58 on the Billboard pop chart.

External media
- Media links for Ernie Freeman

Images
- The Stripper Imperial Records (1962), one of Freeman's album covers
- Jivin "O" Round 1958 album cover by Freeman

Audio
- Audio clips of Freeman's music, on deezer.com

Video
- Raunchy, by Ernie Freeman in 1957

Freeman performed for the famed Cavalcade of Jazz concert produced by Leon Hefflin Sr. held at the Shrine Auditorium in Los Angeles on August 3, 1958. The other headliners were Little Willie John, Ray Charles, Sam Cooke, and Bo Rhambo. Sammy Davis Jr. was there to crown the winner of the Miss Cavalcade of Jazz beauty contest. The event featured the top four prominent disc jockey of Los Angeles.

In 1958 the Ernie Fields Orchestra, including Freeman, became the house band for the newly formed Rendezvous record label. In 1961, with Palmer, Johnson, and René Hall, they began recording as B. Bumble and the Stingers, and Freeman played piano on their first hit, "Bumble Boogie" (but not their later hit, "Nut Rocker"). In the same year, Lew Bedell, the owner of Doré Records, suggested to him that he record a version of a Maxwell House advertising jingle. The record, "Percolator (Twist)", an album by Earl Palmer but was inaccurately credited to Billy Joe & the Checkmates. Earl's album rose to no.10 on the Billboard Hot 100 in early 1962. Freeman also performed with and arranged for the Routers and their parallel group the Marketts.

He continued a successful session career in the 1960s, arranging and appearing on material by Frank Sinatra ("That's Life", "Strangers in the Night"), Connie Francis ("Jealous Heart", "Addio, mi' amore"), Dean Martin ("Everybody Loves Somebody", "Somewhere There's a Someone"), Johnny Mathis, and Petula Clark ("This Is My Song", "For Love"), and becoming musical director with Reprise Records. From 1960 to 1969 he arranged virtually every session for Snuff Garrett at Liberty Records including artists Julie London, Bobby Vee, Johnny Burnette, Gene McDaniels, Timi Yuro, and Walter Brennan, as well as a series of over 25 instrumental albums with the title "The 50 Guitars of Tommy Garrett" that featured a who's who of Los Angeles session musicians, Tommy Tedesco, Laurindo Almeida, Howard Roberts, Bob Bain, and Barney Kessel, among many, many others. As a footnote, "National City" by the Joiner Arkansas Junior High School Band charted at 53 in May 1960 was made by a group of studio musicians led by Freeman. Freeman also composed music for several films, including The Cool Ones (1967), The Double Man (1967), The Pink Jungle (1968), and Duffy (1968); and arranged Carol Burnett's 1972 Columbia Records album Carol Burnett Featuring If I Could Write a Song.

In 1970 Freeman contributed string arrangements to Simon and Garfunkel's Bridge Over Troubled Water album before his retirement later in the decade. In 1972, he had a single "The Overture" released on the Oak Records label. Freeman was a board member and served as secretary of the National Academy of Recording Arts & Sciences in 1964.

According to several sources, Freeman suffered from alcoholism. He died at his home in Los Angeles in 1981 from a heart attack and is buried at Forest Lawn Memorial Park, Glendale, California.

== Awards ==
Freeman won Grammy awards for his arrangements of Frank Sinatra's "Strangers in the Night" (1966) and Simon and Garfunkel's "Bridge Over Troubled Water" (1970).

== Discography ==
=== Singles (as named performer) ===
Year	Single (A-side, B-side) Both sides from same album except where indicated	Chart Positions		Album
Year	Single (A-side, B-side) Both sides from same album except where indicated	US Pop	US R&B	Album
1955	"Jivin' Around"—Part 1 b/w Part 2	-	5	Jivin "O" Round
1955	"The Shuck" b/w "Our Love"	-	-	Non-album tracks
1956	"Lost Dreams" b/w "Rockin' Around"	-	7	Jivin "O" Round
1956	"Rainy Day" b/w "Funny Face"	-	-	Jivin "O" Round
1956	"Spring Fever" b/w "Walking The Beat"	-	-	Jivin "O" Round
1956	"A Touch Of The Blues" b/w "Return To Me"	-	-	Jivin "O" Round
1957	"Without a Love" b/w "Night Life"	-	-	Non-album tracks
1957	"River Boat" b/w "Swing It" (Non-album track)	-	-	Twistin' Time
1957	"Dumplin's" b/w "Beautiful Weekend"	75	-	Twistin' Time
1957	"Raunchy" b/w "Puddin'" (Non-album track)	4	1	Raunchy
1958	"The Tuttle" b/w "Leaps and Bounds"	-	-	Non-album tracks
1958	"Theme From Igor" b/w "Shape Up"	-	-	Non-album tracks
1958	"Indian Love Call" b/w "Summer Serenade"	59	-	Dreaming With Freeman
1958	"Rose Marie" b/w "After Sunset" (from Dreaming With Freeman)	-	-	Non-album tracks
1958	"Jamboree" b/w "Junior Jive"	-	-	Non-album tracks
1958	"School Room Rock" b/w "Blues After Hours"	-	-	Non-album tracks
1959	"Live It Up" b/w "Whispering Hope"	-	-	Non-album tracks
1959	"Marshmallows, Popcorn and Soda Pop" b/w "Honey"	-	-	Twistin' Time
1959	"A Summer Love" b/w "Always With You"	-	-	Non-album tracks
1959	"One More Time Around" b/w "Lost Dreams"	-	-	Non-album tracks
1959	"Big River" b/w "Night Sounds" (from Twistin' Time)	-	-	Non-album tracks
1960	"Beautiful Obsession" b/w "Tenderfoot"; Shown as "Sir Chauncey and His Exciting Strings"	-	-	Non-album tracks
1960	"Rockin' Red Wing" b/w "Dark Eyes"	106	-	Non-album tracks
1960	"Prayers" b/w "Autumn and Eve"	-	-	Non-album tracks
1960	"Theme from The Dark at the Top of the Stairs" b/w "Come On Home" (from Raunchy)	70	-	The Dark At The Top Of The Stairs
1960	"Midi-Midinette" b/w "Beyond Our Love"; Shown as "Sir Chauncey"	-	-	Non-album tracks
1960	"Hawaiian Eye" b/w "Heartbreak Hotel"	-	-	Non-album tracks
1961	"That's All" b/w "Swamp Meeting"	-	-	Raunchy
1961	"Warsaw Concerto" b/w "Theme From Return To Peyton Place"	-	-	Non-album tracks
1961	"The Swingin' Preacher" b/w "Conquest" (from Twistin' Time)	-	-	Non-album tracks
1962	"The Twist" b/w "Shine On, Harvest Moon" (from The Stripper)	93	-	Twistin' Time
1962	"What Am I Living For" b/w "I Didn't Want To Do It"	-	-	The Stripper
1962	"The Stripper" b/w "I Hear You Knocking" (Non-album track)	-	-	The Stripper
1962	"The Freeloader" b/w "Say It Isn't So" (from Ernie Freeman Plays Irving Berlin)	-	-	Non-album tracks
1962	"Half as Much" b/w "I'm Sorry for You, My Friend"	-	-	Soulful Sound Of Country Classics
1965	"Raunchy '65" b/w "Jivin' Around"	-	-	Non-album tracks

=== Selected albums ===
==== As lead musician ====
- Plays Irving Berlin (Imperial, 1956)
- Jivin' O Round (Imperial, 1957)
- Raunchy (Imperial, 1957)
- Theme from The Dark at the Top of the Stairs (Imperial, 1960)
- Twistin' Time (Imperial, 1962)
- Limbo Dance Party (Liberty, 1962)
- Ernie Freeman at the Organ (Liberty, 1963)
- Hit Maker (ABC, 1967)

==== Others ====
- Cry of the Wounded Jukebox (with Lorenzo Holden, Southland, 1954–56)
- Man of Many Parts (with Buddy Collette, Contemporary, 1956)
- Rockin' with Plas (with Plas Johnson, Capitol, 1957)
- The Capitol Years (with Johnny Otis, Capitol, 1957)
- This Must Be the Plas (with Plas Johnson, Capitol, 1959)
- Mood for the Blues (with Plas Johnson, Capitol, 1960)
- National City (with Joiner Arkansas Junior High School Band, Liberty, 1960)
- Half Past Lonely (with Flo Bennett, SS Jazz, 1962)
- Bring It On Home To Me (with Sam Cooke, RCA Victor, 1962)
- Roots (with Jimmy Witherspoon, Reprise, 1962)
- Baby, Baby, Baby (with Jimmy Witherspoon, Prestige, 1963)
- Charlie Barnet (with Charlie Barnet, Ava, 1962)
- The Intimate Keely Smith (with Keely Smith, Reprise, 1965)

."Stay With Me" Vic Damone 1966 RCA Victor.

.Album, "THAT'S Life!" Arranger & Conductor. Vocals by Frank Sinatra. Reprise 1966
