= Oak Records =

- Founded: 1970
- Founder: Ray Ruff
- Genre: Various
- Country of origin: United States
- Official website: www.oakrecordsmusic.com

Oak Records is an independent record label that has released recordings by Ernie Freeman, Doug Gibbs, Five Flights Up, James Talley, Stephanie Winslow, and Dwight Yoakam. It has been releasing recordings since the 1970s.

== Info ==
The label was founded by Ray Ruff in 1970.

In the latter part of 1971, Oak was a new company. Ruff, the owner, was preparing a 2LP set of Bible stories, Truth of Truths for Christmas to be pushed through independent distributors. In November, Billboard said he was involved in licensing deals with GRT Music Tapes. Due to the renewed popularity of religious music, Oak president Ruff had offers from record companies and a large advance for license rights to their rock opera album, Truth of Truths. Over them, he chose GRT Music Tapes. By October that year they had their new vice-president and man in charge of promotion merchandising, Dave Chackler. Prior to his coming on board with Oak, Chackler had been the national promo chief for the Happy Tiger record label.

It was announced in the January 8, 1972 issue of Billboard that Ernie Freeman was the head of A&R for the label. Prior to that Freeman was a producer for the label. Also that year, Oak teamed up with Radio KDAY for the Truth of Truths Christian rock opera which was held at the Greek Theater in Los Angeles on April 2. A Recording of the same name was produced by Ray Ruff. By mid November 1972, David Chackler had left Oak and joined Jimmy Miller Productions as its GM in charge of merchandising and promotion.

== Artists ==
Actor Lee van Cleef was signed to the label around June 1972 and set to become a recording artist. According to Ray Ruff, he was there to record concept albums. The first of the albums was to be called Gunfighter. According to the article in the July 8 article of Cashbox, the album was to be released in August that year and there were plans to release more by him. Also in 1972, one of the label's artists Doug Gibbs had a hit on the soul chart with "I'll Always Have You There" which peaked at #25 on October 25.

In the 1980s, Dwight Yoakam had a six track EP Guitars, Cadillacs, Etc., Etc. released on the label.

== Personnel ==
- President - Ray Ruff
- A&R Director, Conductor - Ernie Freeman
- Vice president - Dave Chackler
