= Bobby Vinton's Greatest Hits of Love =

Compilation album by Bobby Vinton
- Released: December 1969
- Genre: Pop
- Label: Epic
- Producer: Billy Sherrill

Bobby Vinton chronology
Vinton (1969)	Bobby Vinton's Greatest Hits of Love (1969)	My Elusive Dreams (1970)

Bobby Vinton's Greatest Hits of Love is a collection of Vinton's singles that were hits from 1967 to 1969. The album also includes two album tracks and two unreleased songs.

== Track listing ==
Side 1
No.	Title	Writer(s)	Original album	Length
1.	"For All We Know"	J. Fred Coots, Sam M. Lewis		2:47
2.	"Please Love Me Forever"	John Malone, Ollie Blanchard	Please Love Me Forever	2:37
3.	"Halfway to Paradise"	Gerry Goffin, Carole King	I Love How You Love Me	2:38
4.	"To Know You Is to Love You"	Phil Spector	Vinton	2:17
5.	"The Days of Sand and Shovels"	Doyle Marsh, George Reneau	Vinton	3:44

Side 2
No.	Title	Writer(s)	Original album	Length
1.	"I Love How You Love Me"	Barry Mann, Larry Kolber	I Love How You Love Me	2:28
2.	"Just as Much as Ever"	Charlie Singleton, Larry Coleman	Please Love Me Forever	2:19
3.	"Sentimental Me"	Jimmy Cassin, Jim Morehead	Roses Are Red	2:21
4.	"Take Good Care of My Baby"	Gerry Goffin, Carole King	Take Good Care of My Baby	2:44
5.	"When I Fall in Love"	Edward Heyman, Victor Young	Vinton	2:17
6.	"Wanted"	Jack Fulton, Lois Steele		2:28

== Personnel ==
- Billy Sherrill - producer, arranger ("Take Good Care of My Baby")
- Bill McElhiney - arranger ("To Know You Is to Love You", "The Days of Sand and Shovels" and "I Love How You Love Me")
- Tom Sparkman - engineer

== Charts ==
Chart (1969)	Peak position
Billboard Top LPs	138
