= Barry Ryan discography =

- Studio albums: 8
- Compilation albums: 10
- Singles: 40

This is the discography of British singer Barry Ryan, as a solo artist and with his brother Paul Ryan.

== Albums ==
=== Studio albums ===
Title	Album details	Peak chart positions
Title	Album details	GER
Two of a Kind	Released: July 1967; Label: Decca; With Paul Ryan	—
Paul & Barry Ryan	Released: 1968; Label: MGM; With Paul Ryan	—
Barry Ryan Sings Paul Ryan	Released: April 1969; Label: MGM	16
Barry Ryan	Released: September 1969; Label: Polydor	—
Barry Ryan 3	Released: November 1970; Label: Polydor; Germany-only release	—
Red Man	Released: 1971; Label: Polydor; Germany and France-only release	—
Sanctus, Sanctus Hallelujah	Released: 1972; Label: Polydor; Germany-only release	—
Hello Again	Released: 2003; Label: Self-release	—
"—" denotes releases that did not chart or were not released in that territory.

=== Compilation albums ===
Title	Album details
Starportrait	Released: 1971; Label: Polydor; Germany-only release
The Best of Barry Ryan	Released: 1973; Label: Brunswick; Germany-only release
Pop Power – The Fantastic Barry Ryan	Released: 1976; Label: Polydor; Germany-only release
Eloise	Released: 1981; Label: Karussell; Germany-only release
The Very Best of Barry Ryan	Released: 1992; Label: Polydor
Meisterstücke	Released: 1997; Label: Spectrum; Germany-only release
The Best of Paul & Barry Ryan	Released: 1998; Label: Repertoire; Germany-only release
The Singles+	Released: 2000; Label: BR Music; Netherlands-only release
Singing The Songs of Paul Ryan 1968–69	Released: 2005; Label: Rev-Ola
Have Pity on the Boys! – The Pop Hits and More 1965–1968	Released: 4 May 2018; Label: Teensville; With Barry Ryan

== Singles ==
Title	Year	Peak chart positions										Label
Title	Year	UK	AUS	AUT	BE (FL)	BE (WA)	CAN	GER	NL	SWI	US	Label
"Don't Bring Me Your Heartaches" (with Paul Ryan)	1965	13	—	—	—	—	—	—	—	—	—	Decca
"Have Pity on the Boy" (with Paul Ryan)	1966	18	—	—	—	—	—	—	—	—	—	Decca
"I Love Her" (with Paul Ryan)	1966	17	—	—	—	—	—	—	—	—	—	Decca
"I Love How You Love Me" (with Paul Ryan)	1966	21	—	—	—	—	—	—	—	—	—	Decca
"Have You Ever Loved Somebody" (with Paul Ryan)	1966	49	—	—	—	—	—	—	—	—	—	Decca
"Missy, Missy" (with Paul Ryan)	1966	43	—	—	—	—	—	—	—	—	—	Decca
"Keep It Out of Sight" (with Paul Ryan)	1967	30	—	—	—	—	—	—	—	—	—	Decca
"Claire" (with Paul Ryan)	1967	47	—	—	—	—	—	—	—	—	—	Decca
"Heartbreaker" (with Paul Ryan)	1967	—	—	—	—	—	—	—	—	—	—	MGM
"Pictures of Today" (with Paul Ryan)	1968	—	—	—	—	—	—	—	—	—	—	MGM
"Goodbye"	1968	—	—	—	—	—	—	—	—	—	—	MGM
"Eloise" (with the Majority)	1969	2	1	2	1	1	36	1	1	1	86	MGM
"Love Is Love" (with the Majority)	1969	25	45	11	2	1	—	4	7	6	—	MGM
"The Colour of My Love" (Continental Europe and South Africa-only release)	1969	—	—	—	—	19	—	23	—	—	—	MGM
"The Hunt"	1969	34	—	20	—	46	—	22	—	—	—	Polydor
"Magical Spiel" (with the Candy Choir)	1970	49	—	—	—	49	—	22	—	—	—	Polydor
"Kitsch"	1970	37	—	—	10	21	—	10	3	—	—	Polydor
"We Did It Together" (Germany and Scandinavia-only release)	1970	—	—	—	—	—	—	—	—	—	—	Polydor
"It Is Written"	1971	—	—	—	—	—	—	50	—	—	—	Polydor
"Red Man" (Continental Europe-only release)	1971	—	—	—	—	26	—	—	—	—	—	Polydor
"Zeit macht nur vor dem Teufel halt" (Germany-only release)	1971	—	—	—	—	—	—	8	—	—	—	Polydor
"Can't Let You Go"	1971	32	—	—	—	47	—	—	—	—	—	Polydor
"From My Head to My Toe"	1972	—	—	—	—	—	—	—	—	—	—	Polydor
"Sanctus, Sanctus, Hallelujah" (Continental Europe-only release)	1972	—	—	—	—	—	—	42	—	—	—	Polydor
"I'm Sorry Susan"	1972	—	—	—	—	—	—	—	—	—	—	Polydor
"Won't You Join Me" (with Paul Ryan)	1973	—	—	—	—	—	—	—	—	—	—	Polydor
"So laß uns leben" (with Paul Ryan; Germany-only release)	1973	—	—	—	—	—	—	—	—	—	—	Polydor
"Carry the Blues" (with Paul Ryan)	1974	—	—	—	—	—	—	—	—	—	—	Polydor
"Nothing's Gonna Change Our World" (with Paul Ryan; Germany and Netherlands-only release)	1974	—	—	—	—	—	—	—	—	—	—	Ariola
"Do That"	1975	—	—	—	—	—	—	—	—	—	—	Dawn
"Matayo" (as Matayo)	1975	—	—	—	—	—	—	—	—	—	—	Rak
"Judy"	1976	—	—	—	—	—	—	—	—	—	—	Bell
"Where Were You"	1976	—	—	—	—	—	—	—	—	—	—	Private Stock
"Brother"	1977	—	—	—	—	—	—	—	—	—	—	Private Stock
"Turn Away" (Europe-only release)	1989	—	—	—	—	—	—	—	—	—	—	RCA
"Light in Your Heart" (Germany-only release)	1990	—	—	—	—	—	—	—	—	—	—	RCA
"Eloise '91" (Germany-only release)	1991	—	—	—	—	—	—	—	—	—	—	Polydor
"Eloise 2"	2006	—	—	—	—	—	—	—	—	—	—	Blue Martin
"Music of Youth '65 (Back to '65)"	2019	—	—	—	—	—	—	—	—	—	—	Rakel Productions
"Je suis encore mordue (So Not Over You)"	2020	—	—	—	—	—	—	—	—	—	—	Rakel Productions
"—" denotes releases that did not chart or were not released in that territory.
