= Jimmy Crawford (British singer) =

English pop singer (1937–2024)

- Born: Ronald James William Crawford Lindsay; 18 November 1937; Sheffield, Yorkshire, England
- Died: 24 July 2024 (aged 86) Chesterfield, Derbyshire, England
- Genres: Pop
- Occupation: Singer
- Instrument: Vocals
- Years active: 1960s–1970s
- Label: Columbia

Ronald James William Crawford Lindsay (18 November 1937 – 24 July 2024), known professionally as Jimmy Crawford, was an English pop music singer. He is best known for his cover version of "I Love How You Love Me" (1961).

== Life and career ==
Crawford was born in Sheffield, Yorkshire, England on 18 November 1937. He was educated at the Central Technical School in Sheffield, and later worked as a draughtsman at Davy United. Crawford was a competition swimmer, after learning to overcome his fear of the water during his spell of National service in the Army. Crawford was a contemporary of fellow Sheffield-born singer, Dave Berry.

He formed his first band, Ron Lindsay and the Coasters, and played in local clubs, but found chart success as a solo artist. Signed to a recording contract with Columbia, he released "Love or Money" in June 1961. It spent one week at No. 49 in the UK Singles Chart. His second release garnered his biggest hit. Crawford's cover version of the American hit, "I Love How You Love Me", had originally been recorded by The Paris Sisters. Crawford's effort peaked at No. 18 in November the same year, spending a total of ten weeks in the UK listings. His third single, "I Shoulda Listened to Mama" was released in May 1962, but failed to reach the chart.

In 1962, Crawford sang "Take It Easy" and appeared in the film, Play It Cool, also starring Billy Fury and Shane Fenton.

He formed Jimmy Crawford and the Ravens, quickly followed by Jimmy Crawford and the Messengers in early 1963. He later joined forces with Jim Ryder to perform as Jimmy Crawford with the Chantelles. Over the years his backing band was variously known as The Jimmy Crawford Four and The Jimmy Crawford Blend. Crawford toured Australia for six months in 1977, with Jim Ryder (guitar), Gary Lawson (keyboards) and Barry Page (drums).

He and his wife Maureen were involved in a serious traffic collision in March 2005, although both eventually recovered from the ordeal. Crawford died in Chesterfield, Derbyshire, on 24 July 2024, at the age of 86.

== Other versions and appearances ==
Crawford's recording of "Love or Money", which was produced by Frank Barber (who also produced Ricky Valance's "Tell Laura I Love Her"), appeared on the 1961 British Hit Parade, Pt. 2: April–September compilation album, along with another version by The Blackwells.

"I Love How You Love Me" was also a UK chart hit for Maureen Evans in 1964 reaching No. 34, and for Paul and Barry Ryan in 1966 at No. 21. However, Crawford's own version has appeared on many compilation albums in the ensuing years, and numerous on-line marital and romance firms have used his version.

== See also ==
- List of Columbia Graphophone Company artists

== Discography ==
=== Chart singles ===
Year	Title	B-side	UK Singles Chart
1961	"Love or Money" (Dewayne Blackwell)	"Does My Heartache Show" (John D. Loudermilk)	49
1961	"I Love How You Love Me" (Barry Mann, Larry Kolber)	"Our Last Embrace" (Carol Carter, Ray Evans)	18
