= The Hunt (song) =

1969 single by Barry Ryan

Single by Barry Ryan

from the album Barry Ryan
- B-side: "Oh, for the Love of Me"
- Released: 12 September 1969
- Genre: Baroque pop
- Length: 2:59
- Label: Polydor
- Songwriter(s): Paul Ryan
- Producer(s): Bill Landis

Barry Ryan singles chronology
"The Colour of My Love" (1969)	"The Hunt" (1969)	"Magical Spiel" (1970)

"The Hunt" is a song by Barry Ryan, released as a single in September 1969. It peaked at number 34 on the UK Singles Chart.

== Release and reception ==
"The Hunt" was Ryan's first single for Polydor. His previous few singles "Eloise" and "Love Is Love" had been very successful and like them "The Hunt" was written by Barry's brother Paul. However, Barry was "bitterly disappointed... with the relative failure of "The Hunt" in Britain and could only really put it down to the fact that the number was too complicated", with Paul adding that it "was not an easy number for people to catch on to".

Reviewing for New Musical Express, Derek Johnson wrote that "on the debit side of this disc, we have the fact that it's another Paul Ryan song is in much the same expansive style as "Eloise", and lacking the melodic content that would enable the youngsters to whistle it in the streets. On the credit side is an incredible dynamic performance by Barry; a scorching up-tempo pace; and a magnificently-scored arrangement that's almost overpowering in its impact". Peter Jones for Record Mirror wrote that "though there are signs of yet another massive production, in fact this Is a much simpler sort of sound – and for me, it has hit written all over it. Barry is sometimes much-maligned, but fact is that Paul writes good stuff for him, and no expense is spared in making his singles "complete" productions. Once this gets over the first over-done bit, it's a jogging impacty piece". Reviewing for Melody Maker, Carl Wayne of the Move described it as "a tremendous performance. The whole record, and the song, is just a stepping stone away from being a great record. But it tends to fall into a position of uncertainty. The production seems too light and not dramatic enough for what is going on".

== Track listing ==
1. "The Hunt" – 2:59
2. "Oh, for the Love of Me" – 3:02

== Charts ==
Chart (1969)	Peak position
Austria (Ö3 Austria Top 40)	20
Belgium (Ultratop 50 Wallonia)	46
Germany (GfK)	22
UK Singles (OCC)	34
