= List of EMI labels =

This is a list of labels that were owned or distributed by EMI before its dismantling in 2013.

== Angel Music Group (UK) ==
- Charisma Records
- EMI Classics
- Hollywood Records (via a distribution deal with Disney Music Group)

== Blue Note Label Group ==
- Angel Records
  - Seraphim Records
  - Guardian Records
- Blue Note Records
  - Metro Blue
  - Pacific Jazz/World Pacific
  - Narada Jazz
- EMI Classics
- Virgin Classics
- Manhattan Records
- Narada Productions
  - Back Porch Records
  - Higher Octave Music
    - CyberOctave

== Capitol Music Group ==
- Capitol Records
- Harvest Records
- Imperial Records
- Priority Records
- Get Money Gang Entertainment (EMI Label Services)
- Ice H2O Records (EMI Label Services)
- Lench Mob Records (EMI Label Services)
- Twenty-Two Recordings (EMI Label Services)
- Slip-N-Slide Records (EMI Label Services)
- The RMG Music Group (a unit of Twenty-Two Recordings, EMI Label Services)
- Pinegrove Records (joint-venture)
- Capitol Latin

== Caroline Distribution ==
- Astralwerks Records
- Battle Axe Records
- Caroline Records
- Definitive Jux Records
- The Front Line
- Fuel Records (US)
- Gracie Productions
- Gyroscope Records
- Merovingian Music
- Nature Sounds
  - Green Streets Entertainment
- Stones Throw Records

== EMI Christian Music Group ==
- Credential Recordings
- EMI Gospel
- Forefront Records
- Sparrow Records
  - Re:Think
- Tooth and Nail Records
  - BEC Recordings
  - Solid State Records
- VSR Music Group
- BEC Recordings Canada
  - Covenant Recordings

== Virgin Music Group ==
- Virgin Records
- Astralwerks
- Charisma Records
- Relentless Records
- Venture Records
- 10 Records

== Standalone labels ==
- EMI Records
  - EMI Music International Services
  - EMI (IP) Ltd.
- Capitol Records Nashville/EMI Records Nashville
- hEMIsphere
- Music For Pleasure
- Mute Records
- Positiva Records
- Stateside Records

== International labels ==
=== EMI Africa ===
- EMI South Africa
- EMI Nigeria

=== EMI Asia ===
==== EMI Arabia ====
- Soutelphan
- Alam El Phan
- Relax-in International
- Farasan
- Rotana Records

==== EMI China ====
- Gold Typhoon (domestic trade name in China, merger of EMI China and Gold Label, also applied in both Hong Kong and Taiwan)
  - Pathé Orient

==== EMI India ====
- GramCo
- Saregama/RPG Music

==== EMI Indonesia ====
- Arka Music Indonesia
- BLⱯCKBOARD (Blackboard)
- GP Records
- Metrotama Music (New Metro)
- MSC Records

==== EMI Korea ====
- SM Entertainment (SHINee)

==== EMI Malaysia ====
- Positive Tone

==== EMI Philippines ====
- PolyEast Records (domestic trade name in the Philippines, co-owned with Jesmond Chua's Pied Piper and Universal Records)
  - Galaxy Records
    - Cool Records
    - Marigold

==== EMI Thailand ====
- Music Train (Rod Fai Don Tri)

=== EMI Europe ===
- EMIDISC
- EMI Europe Generic

==== EMI Czech Republic ====
- Monitor

==== EMI Denmark ====
- Medley

==== EMI France ====
- Pathé Records
- Virgin Music France (not to be confused with the modern-day Virgin Music France, an imprint of Virgin Music Group)
  - Delabel
    - Hostile Delabel
    - Delabel Editions (now owned by Sony Music Publishing)
  - Source
  - Labels
  - Gum Prod
- Livin' Astro
- Zonophone
- Play On (50%)

==== EMI Germany ====
- Electrola
- UDR Records
- Beka

==== EMI Greece ====
- Minos EMI
  - Rootopia

==== EMI Hungary ====
- EMI Quint

==== EMI Ireland ====
- EMI Records Ireland/EMI Music Ireland

==== EMI Italy ====
- EMI Italiana/EMI Music Italy

==== EMI Netherlands ====
- Bovema

==== EMI Norway ====
- Absolute Music

==== EMI Poland ====
- Duży Dom Dystrybucyjny (DDD) (50%)

==== EMI Romania ====
- Transglobal EMI

==== EMI Russia ====
- Gala/SBA Records, Inc.
  - Galarec
- SBA Production
  - SBA Music Publishing

==== EMI Slovakia ====
- Monitor

==== EMI Spain ====
- Hispavox
- Odeon Records
- EMI Torrelaguna
- Trimeca

==== EMI Sweden ====
- Platina Records
- Grand Recordings Sweden
- Eva Records (25%)

==== EMI Turkey ====
- EMI Kent Music

==== EMI United Kingdom ====
- EMI Records
  - EMI Classics
  - Parlophone Records
    - Regal Recordings
    - RAK Records
    - Food
  - Trooper Enterprises Ltd. (owned by Iron Maiden)
  - Pink Floyd Music Ltd. (owned by Pink Floyd)
  - Queen Productions Ltd. (owned by Queen)
- Virgin Records
  - Virgin Classics
- Chrysalis Records
  - Chrysalis Records International
  - Ensign Records

=== EMI South America ===
==== EMI Argentina ====
- Reliquias

==== EMI Brazil ====
- EMI-Jangada

==== Capitol Latin ====
- EMI Televisa Music

== Independent labels distributed by EMI ==
- Apple Records
- CJ E&M Music and Live
- Disney Music Group (UK/Europe/MENA/Australia/New Zealand distribution only)
  - Hollywood Records
  - Walt Disney Records
- Time Records
- Primary Wave Records
- Ruffhouse
- Alter Bridge Recordings
- Nettwerk Productions
- Wind-up Records
- Polyversal

== Defunct/former labels ==
- 2kSounds
- Columbia Graphophone Company (EMI's Columbia Records, outside the United States, until the 1980s)
  - Columbia Grafonola
- Ministry of Sound Australia (Australian subsidiary of Ministry of Sound, now operating independently with distribution handled by Universal Music Australia)
- EMI Films
- Gramophone Company
- His Master's Voice
  - Die Stimme Seines Herrn (Germany)
  - La Voix De Son Maître (France)
  - La Voce Del Padrone (Italy)
  - La Voz De Su Amo (Spain)
  - La Voz Del Amo (Colombia)
  - A Voz Do Dono (Portugal)
- Negativa (short-lived label)
- RAK Records
- Regal Zonophone
- Studio 2 Stereo Records
- EMI Records Group
  - Enigma Records
  - SBK Records
  - Pendulum Records
  - Wild Pitch Records
  - EMI America Records (1978–1987)
    - EMI-Manhattan Records (1987–1988)
  - EMI USA (mid 1980's–early 1990's)
    - EMI Records USA (1993–1997)
- Top Rank Records
- So So Def Recordings (now owned and distributed by HYBE America)
- I.R.S. Records
- Liberty Records

== See also ==
- EMI
- List of EMI artists
