= List of Columbia Graphophone Company artists =

A partial listing of recording artists who recorded for the Columbia label of the Columbia Graphophone Company, later also EMI. Recordings leased from other labels are also listed.

== A ==
- Adamo
- David Alexander
- Christian Anders
- The Animals
- Paul Anka (recordings leased from ABC-Paramount)
- Billie Anthony
- Richard Anthony
- The Avons

== B ==
- Baltimora
- Chris Barber
- The Barron Knights
- John Barry
- Shirley Bassey
- Gilbert Bécaud
- Jeff Beck
- Chuck Berry (late 1950s, briefly leased from Chess Records)
- Acker Bilk
- Graham Bonney
- Brainbox
- Los Bravos
- Clara Butt

== C ==
- Eddie Calvert
- Howard Carpendale
- Chicago Symphony Orchestra
- C.C.S.
- The Dave Clark Five
- Chubby Checker (first albums, leased from Parkway Records)
- Rosemary Clooney (leased recordings)
- Alma Cogan
- The Congregation
- Russ Conway
- Steve Conway
- Roger Cook
- Charlélie Couture
- Julie Covington
- Jimmy Crawford

== D ==
- Joey Dee and the Starliters (leased recordings from Roulette Records)
- David and Jonathan
- Billie Davis
- Diana Decker
- Kiki Dee
- Carol Deene
- Ken Dodd
- The Dubliners
- Clive Dunn
- The Dovells (leased recordings from Parkway Records)
- Dr. Feelgood and the Interns (leased recordings from Okeh Records)
- Slim Dusty

== E ==
- The Essex (leased from Roulette Records, USA)
- Erste Allgemeine Verunsicherung (Austria)

== F ==
- Bent Fabric
- Georgie Fame
- José Feliciano
- Kathleen Ferrier
- Jackson C. Frank
- Freddie and the Dreamers
- Conny Froboess
- Dean Ford and The Gaylords

== G ==
- Gerry and the Pacemakers
- The Gods
- The Golden Gate Quartet
- Ron Goodwin

== H ==
- Gitte Hænning
- Rolf Harris
- Ronnie Harris
- Heino
- Heinz
- Herman's Hermits
- Benny Hill
- Vince Hill
- Michael Holliday
- The Hollies
- Frankie Howerd
- Chris Howland

== I ==
- Frank Ifield

== J ==
- John's Children
- Paul Jones

== K ==
- Kathy Kirby
- The Koobas
- Peter Kraus

== L ==
- Cleo Laine
- Frank Foo Foo Lammar
- Major Lance (recordings leased from Okeh Records)
- London String Quartet
- The Lords
- Lulu
- Frankie Lymon and the Teenagers (recordings leased from Gee Records)
- Barbara Lyon

== M ==
- Jeanne Mas
- The George Martin Orchestra
- Hank Marvin
- Jessie Matthews
- Guy Mitchell (leased recordings)
- Zoot Money's Big Roll Band
- Russell Morris (Columbia/EMI Australia)
- The Mudlarks
- Ruby Murray

== N ==
- Nina & Frederik
- Peter Noone
- Nomadi

== O ==
- Des O'Connor
- Esther Ofarim

== P ==
- Norrie Paramour and his Orchestra
- Don Partridge
- Peter and Gordon
- Edith Piaf
- Pink Floyd (first three albums, they then switched to Harvest. Their 1975 album Wish You Were Here, recorded for Harvest, was leased to CBS Columbia, USA)
- The Playmates (leased from Roulette Records)
- The Pretty Things (S.F. Sorrow, 1968, then switched to Harvest)
- P.J. Proby

== R ==
- Johnnie Ray (leased recordings)
- The Regents (NY group, leased from Gee, USA)
- Terry Reid
- Cliff Richard
- Malcolm Roberts
- Amália Rodrigues
- Bobby Rydell (leased from Cameo, USA)

== S ==
- The Seekers
- The Shadows
- Helen Shapiro
- Dee Dee Sharp (leased from Cameo, USA)
- Dinah Shore (leased recordings)
- Frank Sinatra (leased recordings)
- Sir Henry and his Butlers
- Sly and the Family Stone (original UK release of "Dance to the Music", leased from Epic Records)
- Hurricane Smith
- Soulsister
- Sounds Incorporated (Studio 2 Stereo)
- Tommy Steele
- Frederick Stock
- Sweet Smoke
- The Syndicats

== T ==
- The Tornados
- Charles Trenet

== V ==
- Ricky Valance
- Frankie Vaughan
- Gene Vincent (1963 single)
- Bobby Vinton (leased from Epic Records)

== W ==
- Helen Watson
- John Walker
- Iris Williams
- Paul Whiteman (leased recordings)
- Roger Whittaker
- The Wurzels

== Y ==
- The Yardbirds

== See also ==
- Columbia Graphophone Company
