= Ronnie Harris (singer) =

English singer (1927–2020)

- Born: Ronald Victor Harris; 28 September 1927; Tottenham, London, England
- Died: 13 December 2020 (aged 93)
- Genres: Pop
- Occupation: Singer
- Years active: 1940s–1960s
- Label: Columbia Records

Ronald Victor Harris (28 September 1927 – 13 December 2020) was a British singer who recorded and performed in the 1950s, achieving a UK singles chart top ten hit in 1955.

== Early life ==
Tottenham-born Harris served in the Second World War as an air mechanic in the Royal Naval Air Service, based in Portsmouth. After demobilisation, he joined his brother's window-cleaning company in north London, but, after a fall from a ladder, the customer invited him inside to recover; the pair got to discussing his love of singing, and he was invited to perform at a concert that evening, the success of which gained him bookings as a singer. He thus turned professional as a dance band singer, and in the late 1940s he teamed up with Margaret Haynes, who performed under the name Terry Blayne, as a duo; the pair were married in January 1950.

== Career ==
In April 1954, Harris signed a record deal with Columbia, and he had over a dozen singles released over the decade, including duets with Barbara Lyon and Sheila Buxton. Despite being the subject of a Pathé News short about the making of a pop single in early 1955, only two of them appeared in the record charts. The first, a cover of the Al Martino hit "The Story of Tina", peaked at no. 12 in the New Musical Express chart in October 1954. The low chart position belied the song's popularity, as he was presented with a Record of the Year award for it in the Royal Albert Hall Record Ball the same month.

His second hit, "Don't Go To Strangers", backed by The Coronets, was at number 9 in the first Record Mirror chart on 22 January 1955, and peaked at 8 a week later. However, it did not appear in the NME chart.

January 1955 also saw Harris making an appearance as himself in the BBC Light Programme's radio comedy series Life with the Lyons, in which Barbara Lyon's character was in love with Harris.

The following month, Columbia released a single pairing two covers of songs from the film Seven Brides for Seven Brothers, "Spring, Spring, Spring" and "Goin' Co'tin'". Joining Harris on the recordings were Ruby Murray, Ray Burns and Diana Decker, backed by Ray Martin and his orchestra.

Harris missed out on a possible hit single in 1957, when he turned down the chance to record "Around the World", thinking that it was not "a particularly good number". Instead, it became a top ten hit for Bing Crosby, Ronnie Hilton, and Gracie Fields.

As skiffle and rock and roll began to dominate the charts, Harris gradually stepped back from performing, and in April 1958 emigrated to Germany; he soon opened his own talent agency, originally based in Wiesbaden. By 1975, he was based in Kent, and specialised in finding European bookings for British acts.

== Personal life and death ==
Harris married Margaret Haynes in Nottingham in January 1950. He latterly lived in Southsea, Hampshire. Harris died on 13 December 2020, aged 93.
