= Kitsch (disambiguation) =

Kitsch, applied to art and design, means naïve imitation, overly eccentric, gratuitous or of banal taste.

Kitsch may also refer to:

- Taylor Kitsch (born 1981), Canadian actor and model
- "Kitsch", a 1970 song by Barry Ryan
- "Kitsch" (song), a 2023 song by South Korean girl group Ive
