= I Love How You Love Me =

1961 song by Barry Mann and Larry Kolber

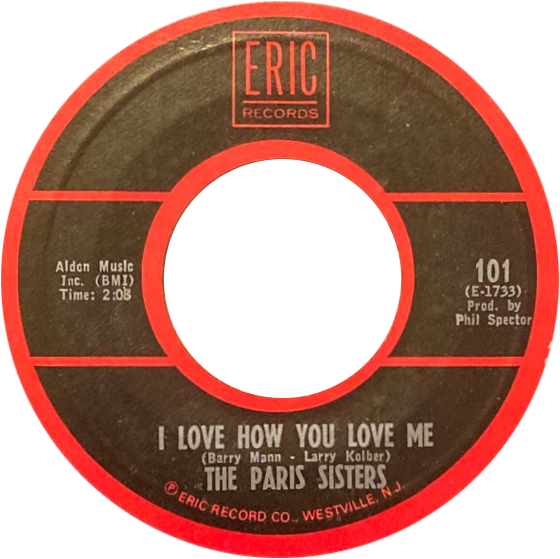
- A US vinyl release

Single by the Paris Sisters
- B-side: "All Through the Night"
- Released: August 1961
- Recorded: 1961
- Studio: Gold Star, Hollywood
- Genre: Pop
- Length: 2:08
- Label: Gregmark
- Songwriters: Barry Mann; Larry Kolber
- Producer: Phil Spector

The Paris Sisters singles chronology
"Be My Boy" (1961)	"I Love How You Love Me" (1961)	"He Knows I Love Him Too Much" (1962)

"I Love How You Love Me" is a song written by Barry Mann and Larry Kolber. It was a 1961 top five hit for pop girl group the Paris Sisters, which inaugurated a string of elaborately produced classic hits by Phil Spector. Bobby Vinton had a top ten hit in 1968 with his version. The song has been recorded by many other artists over the years.

== The Paris Sisters recording ==
=== Background ===
The Paris Sisters recorded "I Love How You Love Me" at Gold Star Studios in the autumn of 1961 with Phil Spector as their producer. The group vocalized repeatedly to a piano accompaniment until Spector was satisfied with the balance between the voices, after which a string arrangement which Spector worked on over several days with Hank Levine was added. The song featured a spoken recitation by lead singer Priscilla Paris, speaking the first half of the repeated first verse in an unsung manner over the instrumental break.

According to Lester Sill, with whom Spector was then staying, Spector would bring the tapes for "I Love How You Love Me" from Gold Star Studios every evening to review in his room: "he would wake me up at three or four in the morning, listening to [the song] over and over again at a very low level." Sill says Spector "must have remixed the strings on that song thirty times; then listened to it for another four or five days before he was sure it was right. Then finally when the record was pressed he listened to the pressing for another two or three days before he gave it an approval."

Spector's interest in the song was occasioned by its structural similarity to "To Know Him Is to Love Him", the No. 1 hit that Spector's group, the Teddy Bears, had scored in 1958. Annette Kleinbard who had been the Teddy Bears' vocalist, would weep upon hearing the Paris Sisters' "I Love How You Love Me" on her car radio: "Before [Priscilla Paris] sung five words I knew it was Phil's record...it was just the most beautiful record, but I loved it and I hated it at the same time; it felt like Phil had taken my voice and passed it on to someone else". However Priscilla Paris would opine: "My sound was not like Annette's - she had a very thin type of little girl voice. I have a heavy roque - that's a French word meaning very heavy, husky - voice. I think Phil fell into something he wanted to do, added extra ingredients, and ended up with something different."

"I Love How You Love Me" was originally intended for Tony Orlando, to be arranged in the same upbeat style as Orlando's precedent hits "Bless You" and "Halfway to Paradise".^{1} The song was written by Barry Mann and Larry Kolber (a.k.a. Kolberg) who were staff writers at Don Kirshner's Aldon Music near the Brill Building. Kolber had written the lyrics on a restaurant napkin within five minutes. When Phil Spector discovered the song on a visit to Kirshner's Aldon offices he persuaded Kirshner that the song would have more potential if rendered by a female act. Spector then recorded "I Love How You Love Me" with the Paris Sisters.

Entering the top 40 of the Billboard Hot 100 in October 1961, "I Love How You Love Me" reached No. 5 that November.

The song peaked at No. 6 on the New Zealand Lever Hit Parade charts.

Billboard ranked the song at number 100 on their list of the "100 Greatest Girl Group Songs of All Time".

The song was used in episode 5 of the 2017 Twin Peaks continuation.

== Bobby Vinton version ==
"I Love How You Love Me"

Single by Bobby Vinton

from the album I Love How You Love Me
- B-side: "Little Barefoot Boy"
- Released: October 4, 1968
- Recorded: August 29, 1968
- Genre: Pop
- Label: Epic
- Songwriters: Barry Mann; Larry Kolber
- Producer: Billy Sherrill

Bobby Vinton singles chronology
"Halfway to Paradise" (1968)	"I Love How You Love Me" (1968)	"To Know You Is to Love You" (1969)

=== Background ===
Bobby Vinton made a comeback in the late 1960s when producer Billy Sherrill had him remake songs which had been hits a few years prior. Vinton took his cover of "I Love How You Love Me" to No. 9 on the Billboard Hot 100 and No. 2 on the Billboard Easy Listening chart. The hit re-vitalized Vinton's recording career and was certified gold by the RIAA. Due to the success of the single, Epic Records released the album I Love How You Love Me that was also a best seller into 1969. Vinton followed up with a version of "To Know Him Is to Love Him" with a track entitled "To Know You Is to Love You" (coincidentally Vinton's precedent single to "I Love How You Love Me" had been a remake of "Halfway to Paradise", the Tony Orlando hit to which "I Love How You Love Me" had been written as the intended follow-up).

=== Charts ===
Chart (1968–1969)	Peak position
U.S. Billboard Hot 100	9

== Other versions ==
- In the United Kingdom, the Paris Sisters' release of the song was overlooked in 1961, in favor of a cover by Jimmy Crawford whose version reached No. 18 on the UK Singles Chart. "I Love How You Love Me" was also a UK chart hit for Maureen Evans in 1964 reaching No. 34, and an up-tempo version for Paul and Barry Ryan in 1966 at No. 21.
- Nino Tempo claims that the Ryans' version of "I Love How You Love Me" was a copy of an upbeat 1965 version he cut as a single with April Stevens which featured fuzz guitar and bagpipes and failed to chart.
- Patty Duke recorded a version in 1966 for her second album for United Artists, Patty.
- "I Love How You Love Me" was also a non-charting single for the Spokesmen in 1966 before being successfully revived in 1968 by Bobby Vinton.
- New Zealand band The Fair Sect released their version, also with fuzz and bagpipes, as a single in 1967.
- The Lettermen covered the song on their album I Have Dreamed, with the spoken part omitted in the middle of the song.
- Virginia Lee (af) recorded "I Love How You Love Me" for her 1970 album Yours!.
- Filipina singer Nora Aunor had a hit in 1971 with her version, a single for Alpha Records.
- Roxy Music front man Bryan Ferry recorded a rendition of "I Love How You Love Me" for his first solo album These Foolish Things (1973).
- Jonathan Butler reached number 4 in the South African chart in 1975 with his rendition.
- Tracy Huang (zh) recorded the song for her 1976 album Feelings.
- Joni Lee recorded her rendition for MCA (MCA-40826), backed with "I Think of You," which entered the Billboard country chart on January 7, 1978.
- Slovak female singer Marika Gombitová covered the Paris Sisters song as "Luk a šíp" (English: Bow and Shaft). Her version, featuring alternate lyrics, was released on Diskotéka OPUSu 1 compilation by OPUS in 1978.
- "I Love How You Love Me" has been a C&W hit for both Lynn Anderson (No. 18 - 1979) and Glen Campbell (No. 17/ also A/C No. 35 - 1982).
- Cheryl Ladd recorded her own rendition of "I Love How You Love Me" for her third and last Capitol Records album Take A Chance.
- Michael Damian covered the song and featured it as the B-side of his 1981 debut single, a cover of Eric Carmen's "She Did It."
- Tom Jones recorded a version of the song which was released on his Beautiful Songs of Love album which was released in 1985.
- Teen Queens had a No. 14 hit in Australia in 1992 with their remake entitled "Love How You Love Me".
- The original version of the Roxette track "Anyone", recorded in 1998 with Per Gessle singing, included a segment of "I Love How You Love Me" that was omitted from the track as it appeared on the 1999 album Have a Nice Day (sung by Marie Fredriksson rather than Gessle). The original Roxette recording was included on the "Anyone" single release, and subtitled "(Tits & Ass Demo 1998)".
- Rose Melberg recorded the song for a 7" EP included with The Patty Duke Fanzine #2 in 2000. All singles in the fanzine series, with additional covers of songs Duke recorded, were compiled on a double-CD tribute album released in 2006, PDFZ#6: Love to Patty.
- "I Love How You Love Me" has also been recorded by Eddy Arnold, Chet Atkins, The Babys, The Broken Family Band, Dana (No. 27 in the Netherlands in 1977), Camera Obscura, Kria Brekkan, Billy Fury, the Lettermen, Lorrie Morgan, Mud, Neutral Milk Hotel, Beth Orton, Sandy Posey, Topi Sorsakoski (Finnish "Vain yksin me kakis"), Jerry Vale, Jeff Mangum, Wizex (as "En vän för alltid"), Maureen Evans, Rachel York, and Saito Yuki.
- The 2000-01 European hit "Love How You Love Me" by Melanie Thornton (Austria No. 48/ Germany No. 15/ Switzerland No. 29) is not related to "I Love How You Love Me" rather being an original composition by Thornton co-written with Mitchell Lennox and Julien Nairolf.
- Kramer produced and sang his version of this song for his Tzadik Records album The Brill Building (2012).
- In the Sonny and Cher biopic And the Beat Goes On, televised in 1999, Cher - who was visiting Sonny Bono in the studio where the track for "I Love How You Love Me" is being recorded - is pressed into service by Spector to sing the song as a scratch vocal (Kelly van Hoose Smith provides "Cher"'s vocals). In fact Sonny Bono did not go to work for Spector until a year after the Paris Sisters' cut "I Love How You Love Me" and it was also in the autumn of 1962 that Bono and Cher first met. However, Cher did first work as a session vocalist in July 1963 when while visiting Bono at Gold Star Studios she was pressed into service by Spector to fill in for the unavailable Darlene Love to sing on the session for the Ronettes' "Be My Baby".
- 70s Chart band Child released " I Love How You Love Me" in 2024 reaching number 1 on the Heritage Chart.
- Indie rock band The Raveonettes covered the song for their 2024 album The Raveonettes Sing….

== References and notes ==
Notes

- ^{1} When Larry Kolber heard the Paris Sisters recording he likened it to a "funeral dirge".

General

- Graclík, Miroslav; Nekvapil, Václav (2008). Marika Gombitová: neautorizovaný životní příběh legendy československé pop music [Marika Gombitová: An Unauthorized Life Story of the Legend of Czechoslovak Pop Music] (in Czech). Prague, Czech Republic: XYZ. p. 446. ISBN 978-80-7388-115-3. OCLC 294939865.
- Lehotský, Oskar (April 23, 2008a). Slovak Popular Music in the Years 1977–1989 – Marika Gombitová (PDF) (in Slovak). Bratislava, Slovakia: Comenius University, Faculty of Arts. Archived from the original (PDF) on 2014-07-14.
- Lehotský, Oskar (April 23, 2008b). Slovak Popular Music in the Years 1977–1989 – Modus (PDF) (in Slovak). Bratislava, Slovakia: Comenius University, Faculty of Arts. Archived from the original (PDF) on 2011-08-19.

Specific
