= Lester Sill =

American record label executive (1918–1994)

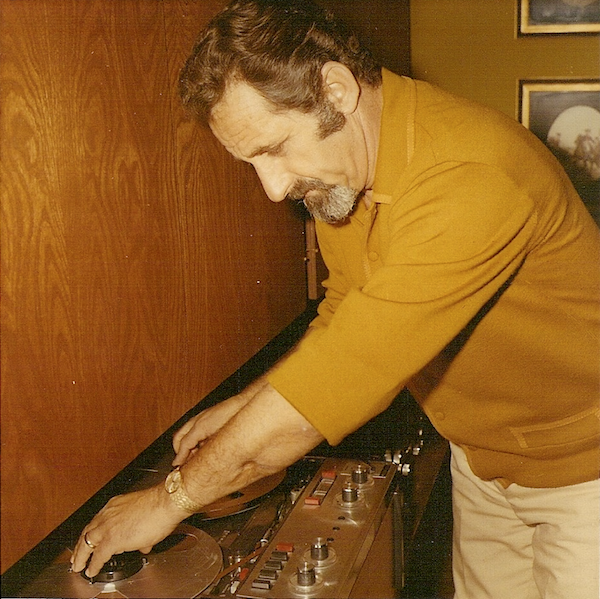
- Born: January 13, 1918; Los Angeles, California, U.S.
- Died: October 31, 1994 (aged 76); Los Angeles, California, U.S.
- Other name: The Chief
- Occupation: Music executive
- Board member of: American Society of Composers, Authors and Publishers; National Music Publishers' Association
- Spouse: Harriet
- Children: Chuck Kaye (stepson); Joel Sill; Greg Sill; Lonnie Sill
- Awards: Prime Minister's Medal
- Musical career
- Occupations: Music publisher, Record executive
- Years active: 1946–1994
- Labels: Spark Records; Jamie Records; Trey Records; Gregmark Records; Philles Records; Colgems Records
- Website: www.gregmarkmusicinc.com

Notes
- Jazz guitarist Alex Sill (grandson)

Lester Sill (January 13, 1918 – October 31, 1994) was an American record label executive, music publisher and recording artist manager within the West Coast Rock & Roll, West Coast R&B and Surf genres. Sill rose to become the president of Screen Gems-Columbia Music, became a long term member on the board of directors at ASCAP, and president of Jobete Music (Motown Records publishing division).

Resisting prejudicial music-industry norms of the era, Sill represented and produced music for talented artists regardless of race, including, T-Bone Walker, Hadda Brooks, B.B. King, The Coasters, Ray Sharpe, Jimmy Witherspoon and The Pentagons. As an independent producer in the 1950s and 1960s, Sill formed record labels and publishing companies around composers like Jerry Leiber and Mike Stoller, Lee Hazlewood and Phil Spector, rostered artists included Duane Eddy, The Coasters, The Paris Sisters, and The Crystals.

Sill is best known as the producer/manager for Duane Eddy, the cofounder of Philles Records, and the music supervisor for The Monkees. Sill's productions often included musicians that went on to become the Wall of Sound, and The Wrecking Crew.

== Early life and family ==
Sill was a dental technician who became a combat engineer in the Army because his papers said he knew about “dentures and bridges.” After serving with the 33rd Replacement Battalion in Casablanca during World War II, he was discharged from the Army in 1945 and left Philadelphia, moving to California to stay with his mother at the beach. Upon arrival, he met four year old Chuck (muddy and scared that he was in trouble), and upon entering his mother's home, he met Chuck's mother Harriet, his future wife. He opened Cotton's Club in Los Angeles on Western Avenue and 35th, with Harriet's brother, Cotton's Club ran afoul of the authorities and was closed for after hours drinking. Sill took some door to door sales positions, which he did not enjoy, until he met Lester Bahari of Modern Records in 1946. He soon found himself working in the record store and was offered a distribution route covering the Fresno to San Diego territory, selling R&B and rock and roll genre records to stores and refreshing jukebox inventory. On his route, he noticed that he was driving by several radio stations and began befriending disc-jockeys, Sunday radio spins helped with his Monday sales.

Sill's three sons became music publishers and music supervisors in film and television, Joel Sill, Greg Sill, and Lonnie Sill. His stepson Chuck Kaye a longtime music publishing executive, his grandson, Alex Sill, is a jazz guitarist with the Simon Phillips band. The film, Ratking (2022) has earned critical acclaim, starring Sill's granddaughter Natasha Sill.

== Career ==
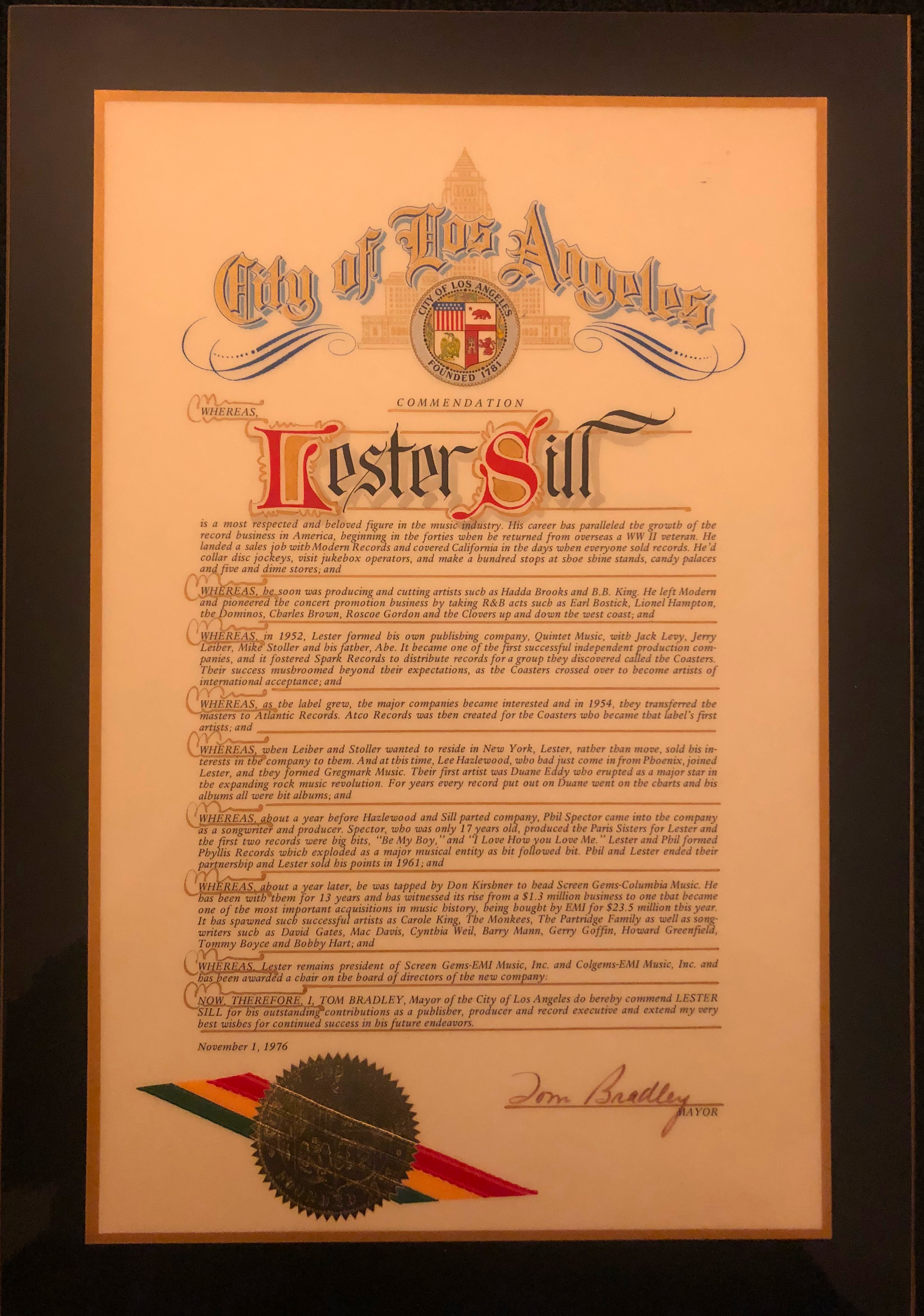
Commendation by Mayor Tom Bradley of Los Angeles to Lester Sill

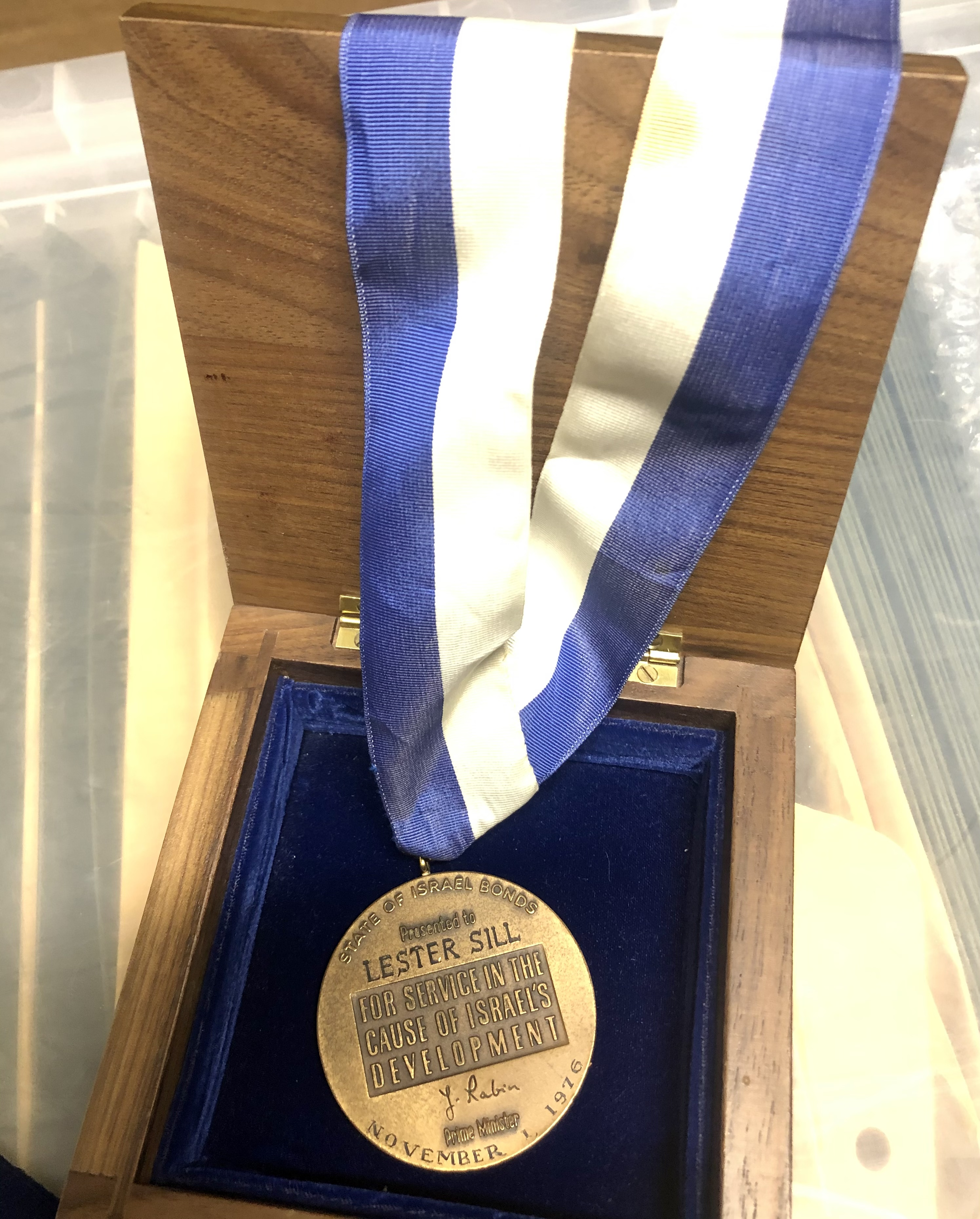
President's Medal awarded to Lester Sill from Yitzhak Rabin

Sill first entered show business as a nightclub owner, but in 1945, he joined the sales and promotion staff of the Bihari brothers' Modern Records, first as a regional sales manager and then producing sessions for R&B acts including Charles Brown and Hadda Brooks. Sill shepherded the fledgling career of the songwriting team of Jerry Leiber and Mike Stoller. In 1950, Sill met Leiber at Modern Records, where the aspiring lyricist worked as a retail clerk and Sill suggested he find a partner who could read and write music, spurring the beginning of Leiber's collaboration with Mike Stoller. Sill produced the 1951 Jimmy Witherspoon effort "Real Ugly Woman", the first recorded Leiber and Stoller collaboration.

Sill and Federal Records producer/talent scout Ralph Bass formed a PR agency, Brisk Enterprises, and following the success of the Leiber and Stoller hit "Hound Dog", performed by Big Mama Thornton, Sill partnered with the duo to create Spark Records, and the publishing firm, Quintet Music, Inc. in 1953. Spark enjoyed success with The Robins' "Riot in Cell Block #9". In 1955, after the release of "Smokey Joe's Café", Spark sold its catalog to Atlantic Records, which in turn named Sill its national sales manager while giving Leiber and Stoller an independent production deal. The deal signaled the end of The Robins, members Carl Gardner and Bobby Nunn continued on as The Coasters, with Sill serving as their manager.

In late 1959, Sill and Hazlewood formed 3 Trey Records (aka Trey), a Hollywood-based imprint distributed by Atlantic Records. Trey Records signings included Phil Spector, fresh off the success of his group The Teddy Bears', chart-topping pop classic, "To Know Him Is to Love Him". Sill allowed Spector to live in his Sherman Oaks home, sharing a room with Joel Sill. Spector worked as an apprentice to Leiber and Stoller, as a studio musician and studio technician. Notable Trey artists included, Dan Blocker, Sanford Clark, Ray Sharpe, and Barbara Dane.

In 1960, 3 Trey released Barbara Dane's, I'm On My Way / Go 'Way From My Window.

In 1960, I recorded a 45 rpm single for the Trey label, one of those Hollywood start-ups whose proliferating offices were "in the glove boxes of their cars," as people in the industry joked. But the two partners, Lester Sill and Lee Hazlewood, were far from pretenders, already very deeply enmeshed in the music industry. In fact, American pop music would have been very different without the two of them. Sill was an all-around music executive who actually brokered the partnership between songwriters Jerry Lieber and Mike Stoller and managed the Coasters, one of the most popular West Coast R&B groups of the day. He survived a long, involved relationship with the legendary, and now infamous, Phil Spector. His partner in Trey Records, Lee Hazlewood, was a singer, songwriter and producer who made his biggest marks working with Nancy Sinatra

— Barbara Dane, This Bell Still Rings: My Life of Defiance and Song, Heyday Books, (2022)

Sill's partner, Lee Hazlewood brought in a young Duane Eddy and began writing songs with him, Sill had also recently partnered with Dick Clark in Jamie Records. Eddy's first song, "Movin' and Groovin" was a moderate success. With the help of Clark's, American Bandstand television show, his next release, "RebelRouser" earned a #6 on the Billboard 100.

At the end of 1961, Sill and Hazlewood shut down Trey but quickly formed a new label, Gregmark Records, as a vehicle for The Paris Sisters. The Paris Sisters' Gregmark debut, "Be My Boy", earned little notice, but the follow-up single, "I Love How You Love Me" cracked the Billboard top five. Spector then began work on a Paris Sisters LP, as Sill attempted to exert financial controls on the project, the master recordings went missing.

Sill and Phil Spector formed their own label in 1961, Philles Records, a combination of both men's first names. Philles immediately reached the top 20 with the debut release of The Crystals', "There's No Other (Like My Baby)" and the 1962 follow-up, "Uptown". The Crystals charted again with "He's a Rebel" and "Then He Kissed Me". Bob B. Soxx & the Blue Jeans charted with "Zip-a-Dee-Doo-Dah" as did The Ronettes' with "Be My Baby". Spector terminated the partnership with Sill upon the delivery of the demo recordings in 1963, "(Let's Dance) The Screw" (Part -1 and Part - 2). Spector's actions made it clear that his contractual obligations would be fulfilled with un-marketable music.

In 1964, Sill became a consultant to Screen Gems-Columbia Music president Don Kirshner. Although the position was temporary, Sill stayed with the company for over two decades, initially as the music supervisor for The Monkees, eventually assuming Kirshner's position as president of Screen Gems-Columbia Music, and took on the additional management task of Beechwood Music involved in the 1976, Screen Gems-EMI merger.

In 1985, Sill was named president of Jobete Music, the publishing arm of Berry Gordy, Jr.'s Motown empire. He remained with Jobete until his death in Los Angeles on October 31, 1994.

== Honors ==
- Prime Ministers' Medal, presented by Abba Eban, November 1, 1976.
- City of Los Angeles Commendation, Mayor Tom Bradley, November 1, 1976.
- Vision Awards/Retina Pigmentosa Foundation, Lester Sill Lifetime Achievement Award recipients:

- Burt Bacharach
- Frances Preston

=== Posthumous remembrances ===
- Lester Sill Humanitarian Awards: Clive Davis (2005), Frances Preston (1999)
- ASCAP Foundation, Lester Sill Songwriters Workshop (1995 - 2005).
