= Eric Delaney =

English drummer and bandleader (1924–2011)

Eric Norman Delaney (22 May 1924 – 14 July 2011) was an English drummer and bandleader, popular in the 1950s and early 1960s.

== Career ==
Delaney was born in Acton, London, England. He studied drumming with Max Abrams. Aged 16, he won the Best Swing Drummer award and later joined the Bert Ambrose Octet, which featured George Shearing on piano. During 1947–54, Delaney appeared with the Geraldo Orchestra and filled his time with regular session work in recording studios and on film, TV and radio. In 1954 he formed his own band and later signed with the new Pye Records label. He made three Royal Variety Show appearances, the first in 1956.

Delaney specialised in up-tempo dance hall music, often carrying a rock and roll label but closer in spirit to that of Geraldo and Joe Loss. As with many similar artists, the music he performed became less popular after the Beatles entered the musical scene. He remained active touring in the UK, notably in holiday resorts.

Delaney was held in high regard by his musical peers, including top American drummer Louie Bellson, with whom he recorded in 1967 on an album entitled Repercussion. Originally released in high quality stereo on the Studio2Stereo label, it was re-released on the Vocalion label in 2011.

Although best known as a swing drummer, Delaney was a multi-percussionist. Classically trained as a tympanist, his unique approach went far beyond the scope of orchestral accompaniment, turning the 'timps' into a lead / solo instrument. He also played xylophone, glockenspiel, military snare drum, tubular bells, Chinese and orchestral gongs, and in his 'showmanship' routines, such as "Persian Market", would run between these, also adding whistles, sandblocks, symphonic cymbals, finger cymbals and pyrotechnics and flying mallets with split-second precision.

The largest gong in the collection was 7" in diameter, one of only three of that size commissioned by Delaney, made by a collaboration between two manufacturers, Percussion Plus and UFIP (strenuous to play, and rarely used). Sometime after its manufacture, he found that the huge size of the gong prohibited its use in some venues, as it would not fit through a standard doorway; he approached the original manufacturers to reduce its size, which they were unable to do due to it already being hammered and shaped. He therefore engaged the services of someone with an angle grinder, and had them cut the gong down to a more practical 74" so that it could be more easily transported. One of the gongs went to the US (location unknown), one went to La Scala theatre in Milan, and his own cut-down gong remains in the UK; his twin-bass drum kits would sit on a one-off revolving stage built for Delaney by British Turntables, whose usual clients were railways wanting to turn locomotives. The drum kit and timpani were internally lit by 60 watt light bulbs; however, Delaney (famed for the 'Permanent Tour'), had a reluctance to invest in drum cases for his high mileage, heavily customized drums, relying instead on woollen blankets and especially careful (and caring) roadies.

Away from the pyrotechnics and showmanship, Delaney would occasionally be found behind a minimal kit, sitting in with a jazz quartet, and letting others take the spotlight; from the 1990s onward, he would also make guest appearances with bands across the UK. Another facet of his work, far removed from the glitterball and screaming trumpets, was his playing on the soundtrack of The Longest Day, in which Delaney's snare opens the movie.

He was married three times, and died of a brain haemorrhage, aged 87 years.

== Discography ==
=== Pye ===
The Eric Delaney Band

- N.15046 "Cockles and Mussels"/"Say Si Si" (04/56)
- N.15054 "Oranges and Lemons"/"Delaney's Delight" (07/56)

"Truckin'"/"Sweet Georgia Brown"

- N.15069 "Rockin' the Tymps"/"Ain't She Sweet" (09/56)
- N.15079 "Rock 'n' Roll King Cole"/"Time for Chimes" (02/57)
- 7N.15113 "Fanfare Jump"/"Jingle Bells" (11/57)

Eric Delaney's Big Beat Six

- 7N.15782 "Big Noise from Winnetka"/"Big Beat" (02/65)

=== Parlophone ===
The Eric Delaney Band

- R4646 "Bass Drum Boogie"/"Let's Get Organised" (1960)
- R4753 "Drum Twist"/"Yes Indeed" (1961)
- R4876 "Washboard Blues Twist"/"Sing, Sing, Sing" (1962)
- R4925 "Manhattan Spiritual"/"Down Home" (1962)

A more complete list of Delaney's records (78 rpm to CD), including earlier Mercury recordings together with a tentative filmography and videography, are recorded in the book The Magnificent Eric Delaney.

=== Marble Arch ===
- The Big Beat of Eric Delaney – MAL 768 (distributed by Pye Records Ltd 1968 (UK))
