= The Colour of My Love (song) =

Sony written by Paul Ryan

Single by Jefferson

from the album The Colour of My Love
- B-side: "Look No Further"
- Released: 14 March 1969
- Genre: Pop
- Length: 2:32
- Label: Pye
- Songwriter: Paul Ryan
- Producer: John Schroeder

Jefferson singles chronology
"Montage" (1968)	"The Colour of My Love" (1969)	"Baby Take Me in Your Arms" (1969)

"The Colour of My Love" is a song written by Paul Ryan. Two artists first released it as a single on the same day, 14 March 1969. A version by Jefferson became a top-30 hit in the UK as well as charting in the US, peaking just inside the top 70 at 68. The other, by Billy J. Kramer, was only released in the UK and failed to chart. Paul Ryan's brother Barry also recorded a version that was released as a single in several countries.

== Jefferson version ==
=== Release ===
After leaving beat group the Rockin' Berries in 1968, Geoff Turton began a solo career under the pseudonym Jefferson. His first release, "Montage", failed to chart, but it was the follow-up "The Colour of My Love" that saw him first enter the charts as a solo artist. However, composer Paul Ryan was not impressed with Jefferson's version, saying "quite frankly, I think it's a load of rubbish. The production is terrible. Jefferson's a nice bloke, but it's very upsetting to hear what someone has done to your song. It's like someone framing a picture you're proud of in a tatty frame".

=== Track listing ===
1. "The Colour of My Love" – 2:32
2. "Look No Further" – 2:35

=== Charts ===
Chart (1969)	Peak position
Belgium (Ultratop 50 Flanders)	19
Canada Top Singles (RPM)	45
Canada Adult Contemporary (RPM)	37
Netherlands (Dutch Top 40)	23
Netherlands (Single Top 100)	20
UK Singles (Official Charts)	22
US Billboard Hot 100	68

== Barry Ryan version ==
"The Colour of My Love"

Single by Barry Ryan

from the album Barry Ryan Sings Paul Ryan
- B-side: "My Mama"
- Released: May 1969
- Genre: Baroque pop
- Length: 2:46
- Label: MGM
- Songwriter: Paul Ryan
- Producer: Bill Landis

Barry Ryan singles chronology
"Love Is Love" (1969)	"The Colour of My Love" (1969)	"The Hunt" (1969)

=== Release ===
Capitalising on the success of Barry Ryan's previous two singles "Eloise" and "Love Is Love" which were particularly successful in Europe, MGM released "The Colour of My Love" as a follow-up single from the album Barry Ryan Sings Paul Ryan. It was released in continental Europe, Scandinavia, South Africa and Rhodesia (Zimbabwe) with the B-side "My Mama", also written by Paul Ryan.

=== Track listing ===
1. "The Colour of My Love" – 2:46
2. "My Mama" – 3:46

=== Charts ===
Chart (1969)	Peak position
Belgium (Ultratop 50 Wallonia)	19
Denmark (IFPI)	4
Germany (GfK)	23
Rhodesia (Lyons Maid)	6

== Other versions ==
- In late 1969, Danish singer Bjørn Tidmand released a Danish-language version titled "Et billed af min kærlighed" as a single which peaked at number 15 on the IFPI Danmark chart.
- In 1970, French singer Dalida released a French-language version titled "Les couleurs de l'amour" as a single.
