= Gregmark Records =

- Parent company: Gregmark Music, Inc.
- Founded: 1961
- Founder: Lester Sill, Lee Hazlewood
- Country of origin: United States
- Location: Los Angeles, CA
- Official website: gregmarkmusicinc.com

Gregmark Records was founded by Lester Sill in 1961, a year before he started Philles Records with Phil Spector.

The Paris Sisters recorded five singles for the label, two of them produced by Spector. Caravan is a Gregmark recording attributed to Duane Eddy, but is actually by the session man, Al Casey.

Gregmark Music
Year	Title	Peak chart positions			B-side	Artist
Year	Title	US Pop	US AC	UK	B-side	Artist
1961	"Sassy"	—	—	—	"Swampin'"	S And H Scamps
1961	"Be My Boy"	56	—	—	"I'll Be Crying Tomorrow"	The Paris Sisters
1961	"Punjab"	—	—	—	"The Lonely Crowd"	S And H Scamps
1961	"I Don't Want To Lose Her Love"	—	—	—	"If I Didn't Know Any Better"	Don Owens
1961	"Caravan (Part 1)"	—	—	42	"Caravan (Part 2)"	Duane Eddy
1961	"I Love How You Love Me"	5	—	—	"All Through the Night"	The Paris Sisters
1961	"Tuesday Night And Wednesday Morning"	—	—	—	"Talk That Talk"	The Other Five
1961	"(I've Been Traveling The) Rough Road"	—	—	—	"You Gotta Go Home"	Tony Gunner
1961	"Who'll Keep An Eye On Jane?"	—	—	—	"3000 Tears"	Billy Storm
1962	"He Knows I Love Him Too Much"	34	7	—	"A Lonely Girl's Prayer"	The Paris Sisters
1962	"That's Alright Baby	—	—	—	"Who"	Gary Crosby
1962	"Let Me Be the One"	87	—	—	"What Am I to Do"	The Paris Sisters
1962	"Yes - I Love You"	—	—	—	"Once Upon a While Ago"	The Paris Sisters
1962	"(The New) Linda Lu"	—	—	—	"The Bus Song"	Ray Sharpe

== See also ==
- List of record labels
