= Don't Think Twice (album) =

Compilation album by Waylon Jennings
- Released: March 1970
- Recorded: April 1964 – January 1965
- Genre: Country
- Label: A&M
- Producers: Herb Alpert; Jerry Moss

Waylon Jennings chronology
Waylon (1970)	Don't Think Twice (1970)	The Best of Waylon Jennings (1970)

Alternative cover
- 2014 rerelease cover

Professional ratings
Review scores
Source	Rating
Allmusic	4/5 stars

Don't Think Twice is the third compilation album by American country music artist Waylon Jennings, released in 1970 on A&M Records. It consists of previously issued singles and a few unreleased recordings from his days at A&M during 1963-65. The title track, as well as "I Don't Believe You" are cover versions of Bob Dylan songs. Several of the other songs on the album are standards. "Just to Satisfy You", first recorded by Jennings in 1964, was re-recorded and issued on the 1969 RCA Victor Jennings album Just to Satisfy You.

== Background ==
By 1970, Waylon Jennings was on a steady but slow path to national prominence as a performer. The previous year, Decca (later MCA, now Universal Music) had purchased the rights to the "JD's" album from Jim Musil, and reissued ten of the album's twelve songs as "Waylon Jennings", on the budget Vocalion label.

Jennings left A&M for RCA in 1965. An album of his A&M recordings remained unreleased for years because the label heads Herb Alpert and Jerry Moss did not like the results. Young staff engineer Bernie Grundman was given the task of reworking the album, retaining the early Jennings vocal tracks but replacing the other instruments with new performances. Grundman re-recorded the album, mixed it and mastered it.

== Reissues ==
In 1978, German reissue label Bear Family obtained reissue rights to the album. Instead of a straight reissue, Bear Family left off the title track, but added "Love Denied" and "Rave On", both sides of Waylon's first A&M single, and never before issued on any album. The reconfigured album, now titled "Rave On", was released in West Germany only, but available as an import in other countries.

Sixteen years later, A&M in Germany reissued the 1970 album on CD as "Don't Think Twice: The A&M Sessions". In 1999, Bear Family reissued the album, as well as other songs recorded for A&M as part of "The Journey: Destiny's Child" box set, which covered Jennings' career from 1959 to 1968.

== Track listing ==
No.	Title	Length
1.	"Don't Think Twice, It's All Right" (Bob Dylan)	3:00
2.	"River Boy" (Fred Carter Jr.)	2:30
3.	"Twelfth of Never" (Jerry Livingston, Paul Francis Webster)	2:24
4.	"The Race Is On" (Don Rollins)	2:30
5.	"Stepping Stone" (Smokey Stover)	1:51
6.	"The Real House of the Rising Sun" (Traditional)	3:35
7.	"Just to Satisfy You" (Don Bowman, Waylon Jennings)	2:21
8.	"Kisses Sweeter Than Wine" (Paul Campbell, Joel Newman)	2:26
9.	"Unchained Melody" (Alex North, Hy Zaret)	3:12
10.	"I Don't Believe You (She Acts Like We Never Have Met)" (Dylan)	4:00
11.	"Four Strong Winds" (Ian Tyson)	2:54
Total length:		30:43
