= Chuck Kaye =

American music industry executive (1940–2021)

- Born: August 28, 1940
- Died: February 1, 2021 (aged 80); Santa Barbara, California, U.S.
- Occupations: Music publisher, record executive
- Years active: 1962–2004
- Relatives: Lester Sill (stepfather); Joel Sill (half brother)

Charles Kaye (August 28, 1940 – February 1, 2021) was an American music industry executive, noted for his tenures at A&M Records, Warner/Chappell Music, and DreamWorks Records, working in diverse areas such as artists and repertoire (A&R), music publishing, and corporate governance.

== Early life ==
Kaye's earliest efforts in music publishing began in New York City in the 1960s, working under the Philles Records label started by Phil Spector and his stepfather, Lester Sill. In 1964, Kaye relocated to Los Angeles to take the role of West Coast Director of Aldon Music. While at Aldon, Kaye worked with songwriters Carole King, Gerry Goffin, Barry Mann, Cynthia Weil, Howard Greenfield, and Neil Sedaka.

In 1966, Kaye started both Rondor Music and Almo/Irving Music which were the publishing companies for A&M Records, owned by Herb Alpert and Jerry Moss.

Kaye began to demonstrate his business acumen by signing acts while heading Herb Alpert and Jerry Moss’ Almo/Irving Music label. During this period, Kaye signed an extensive list of talent that included Alan Parsons, Bob Marley, The Beach Boys, Allee Willis, Steve Winwood, Traffic, Free, Cat Stevens, Bryan Adams, Mason Williams, Jefferson Airplane, John Bettis, Troy Seals, Will Jennings, Paul Williams, Billy Preston, Roger Nichols, Peter Frampton, and Supertramp.

In 1977, Kaye was appointed president of both Almo/Irving and Rondor Music, while also serving as vice-president of A&M Records.

== Warner era ==
In 1980, Kaye partnered with David Geffen to form the Geffen/Kaye Music label. With Geffen, Kaye signed artists like John Lennon, Quarterflash, Michael Sembello, and Dean Pitchford.

After one year, Geffen/Kaye was acquired by its distributor, Warner Brothers Music. Kaye was subsequently appointed chairman of that company, a title which he retained until that company's merger with Chappell & Co. in 1987. Upon completion of the merger which Kaye helped engineer, Kaye became chief executive officer of Warner/Chappell Music.

During his time at Warner, Kaye continued to sign acts to his label. Some of these acts included artists like David Foster, Michael Jackson, Yes, Madonna, Mr. Mister, Mötley Crüe, Scorpions, Albert Hammond, John Bettis, Troy Seals, Jerry Leiber, and Mike Stoller. Kaye acquired 20th Century Fox which had Johnny Mercer and all of the TV episodes of Mash.

== Windswept Pacific era ==
In 1989, Kaye cofounded Windswept Pacific with Joel Sill. Some of the music catalogs and copyrights acquired were as follows: Tommy James and the Shondells, Rod Stewart, Willy Nelson's catalog, The Isley Brothers "Shout", KC and the Sunshine Band, Tito Puente, and John Cougar Mellencamp. EMI Music Publishing acquired the copyrights of Windswept Pacific in 1999.

== DreamWorks ==
In 1997, Kaye returned to work with David Geffen as Head of Music Publishing at DreamWorks Records Music. Kaye acquired the following:

Catalogs: John Denver, Stevie Ray Vaughan, The Byrds, Rickie Lee Jones, Martha Davis (The Motels), and Billy Strayhorn.
Songs: "Disco Inferno" and "Monster Mash".
Bands: Papa Roach, Lifehouse, Powerman 5000, and Jimmy Eat World.

== Death ==
Kaye died from complications of COVID-19 in Santa Barbara, California, on February 1, 2021, at the age of 80.
