= The Best of Waylon Jennings =

Greatest hits album by Waylon Jennings
- Released: June 1970
- Recorded: 1966–1969
- Genre: Country
- Label: RCA Victor

Waylon Jennings chronology
Don't Think Twice (1970)	The Best of Waylon Jennings (1970)	Ned Kelly (1970)

Professional ratings
Review scores
Source	Rating
AllMusic	3/5 stars

The Best of Waylon Jennings is the second compilation album by American country music artist Waylon Jennings, released in 1970 on RCA Victor.

== Track listings ==
=== US version ===
1. "The Days of Sand and Shovels" (Doyle Marsh, George Reneau)
2. "MacArthur Park" (Jimmy Webb) (with The Kimberlys)
3. "Delia's Gone" (Waylon Jennings, Tommy Jennings)
4. "Walk on Out of My Mind" (Red Lane)
5. "Anita, You're Dreaming" (Don Bowman, Jennings)
6. "Only Daddy That'll Walk the Line" (Jimmy Bryant)
7. "Just to Satisfy You" (Bowman, Jennings)
8. "I Got You" (Gordon Galbraith, Ricci Mareno) (with Anita Carter)
9. "Something's Wrong in California" (Wayne Carson, Rodney Lay)
10. "Ruby, Don't Take Your Love to Town" (Mel Tillis)

=== European version ===
1. "Love of the Common People" (Ronnie Wilkins, John Hurley)
2. "The Days Of Sand and Shovels" (Doyle Marsh, George Reneau)
3. "MacArthur Park" (Jimmy Webb) (with The Kimberlys)
4. "Delia's Gone" (Waylon Jennings, Tommy Jennings)
5. "Walk On Out of My Mind" (Red Lane)
6. "Anita, You're Dreaming" (Don Bowman, Jennings)
7. "Only Daddy That'll Walk the Line" (Jimmy Bryant)
8. "Just To Satisfy You" (Bowman, Jennings)
9. "I Got You" (Gordon Gaibraith, Ricci Mareno) (with Anita Carter)
10. "Something's Wrong In California" (Wayne Carson, Rodney Lay)
11. "Ruby, Don't Take Your Love To Town" (Mel Tillis)
12. "Brown-Eyed Handsome Man" (Chuck Berry)
13. "Singer Of Sad Songs" (Alex Zanetis)

=== 1983 U.S. version ===
1. "The Days of Sand and Shovels" (Doyle Marsh/George Reneau)
2. "MacArthur Park" (Jimmy Webb) (with The Kimberlys)
3. "Delia's Gone" (Waylon Jennings/Tommy Jennings)
4. "Walk On Out of My Mind" (Red Lane)
5. "Only Daddy That'll Walk The Line" (Jimmy Bryant)
6. "Just to Satisfy You" (Bowman/Jennings)
7. "Anita, You're Dreaming" (Don Bowman/Jennings)
8. "Ruby, Don't Take Your Love To Town" (Mel Tillis)
