= Waylon (album) =

1970 album by Waylon Jennings

Studio album by Waylon Jennings
- Released: January 1970
- Recorded: February 1967 – October 1969
- Studio: RCA Studio A (Nashville, Tennessee)
- Genre: Country
- Length: 27:16
- Label: RCA Victor
- Producer: Chet Atkins; Danny Davis

Waylon Jennings chronology
Country-Folk (1969)	Waylon (1970)	Don't Think Twice (1970)

Professional ratings
Review scores
Source	Rating
Allmusic	4/5 stars

Waylon is the twelfth studio album by American country music artist Waylon Jennings, released in 1970 on RCA Victor.

== Background ==
Waylon is best remembered for the cover of Chuck Berry's "Brown Eyed Handsome Man," which climbed to #3 on the Billboard country charts, Jennings third Top 5 solo hit. Jennings would perform the song as part of a medley on The Johnny Cash Show. Aside from "Brown-Eyed Handsome Man", none of the other songs on this LP were released as singles. The version of "Yes, Virginia" presented here is different from the one originally issued on The One and Only in 1967. According to Waylon's autobiography, the song "Yellow Haired Woman" was written about Barbara Rood, his third wife. Waylon is also significant for its version of "The Thirty-Third of August," written by Texas songwriter Mickey Newbury, a key figure among a new generation of country songwriters that would contribute to the outlaw country movement in country music, of which Jennings would be a central focus. As Tom Jurek observes in his AllMusic review of the album:

"This self-titled album signifies the real beginning of Waylon Jennings' discontent with his career. He is making efforts in the studio here to stretch its boundaries and include material very foreign to Nashville...But it's with Mickey Newbury's "33rd of August" that the pokiness of Waylon's mission becomes apparent. In the slow dirge, complete with gorgeous layers and textures of strings, aberrant percussion, and backing vocals that whisper rather than chorus, Jennings offers another dimension to not only this sad story, but the direction of his musical muse, somewhere in the groove but outside the confines of the studio."

Despite chart success, Jennings had grown frustrated with the Nashville Sound that had been imposed on his records by RCA Victor and especially resented being told what to record. As Joe Nick Patoski notes in his memoir Willie Nelson, "In addition to doing more and more of the songs he wanted to do rather than what the producer chose, Waylon wanted to produce himself and was demanding control of where the records were made, the song selection, and the artwork that decorated the album cover." Relations between Jennings and RCA Victor became increasingly strained during this period.

Waylon also includes a duet with Anita Carter on the Merle Haggard composition "All of Me Belongs to You." Jennings had covered two Haggard songs previously on his 1968 LP Jewels but, as he recounted in his autobiography years later, he became wary of the country star after a card game, recalling, "Merle Haggard and his manager, Fuzzy Owen, got me in a poker game and cleaned me out. I had four or five thousand dollars on me, and they won everything. I think Merle is a great singer and songwriter, and probably he was in as bad a shape as I was, but we've never been close since that night. I can still remember their faces. When I was broke, they said their goodbyes and left. I never forgot that."

== Critical reception ==
Waylon reached number 14 on the Billboard country albums chart. Thom Jurek on AllMusic: "Waylon is an overlooked gem in the transition period of Jennings' career."

== Track listing ==
No.	Title	Writer(s)	Length
1.	"Brown-Eyed Handsome Man"	Chuck Berry	2:03
2.	"Just Across the Way"	Red Lane	2:39
3.	"Don't Play the Game"	George Pollock	2:55
4.	"Shutting Out the Light"	Woody Starr, Claude Brown	2:40
5.	"I May Never Pass This Way Again"	Ray Buzzeo	2:49
6.	"The Thirty-Third Of August"	Mickey Newbury	3:28
7.	"Yellow Haired Woman"	Waylon Jennings, Lane	1:51
8.	"Where Love Has Died"	Jim Owen	2:16
9.	"All of Me Belongs to You" (duet with Anita Carter)	Merle Haggard	2:06
10.	"Yes, Virginia"	Liz Anderson	2:37
11.	"This Time Tomorrow (I'll Be Gone)"	Joe Maphis, Rose Lee Maphis	1:48

== Personnel ==
- Waylon Jennings – lead vocals
- James Carson, Dottie Dilliard, Priscilla Mitchell, Louis Dean Nunley, Sandra Robinson, Bergen White – backing vocals
- Bobby Dyson, Norbert Putnam – bass guitar
- Byron Bach, Martha McCrory – cello
- John Duke – clarinet
- Jerry Reed – dobro
- Kenny Buttrey (tracks 3,5,6,7,10), Jerry Carrigan (tracks 1,8), Buddy Harman (tracks 2,4,9) – drums
- Anita Carter – duet vocals on "All of Me Belongs to You
- John Duke, Norman Ray – flute
- Fred Carter Jr., Wayne Moss, Jerry Reed, Dale Sellers, Velma Smith, Pete Wade, John Buck Wilkin, Chip Young – guitar
- Charlie McCoy – harmonica
- Charlie McCoy – organ
- Farrell Morris – percussion
- David Briggs, Hargus "Pig" Robbins – piano
- Bergen White – string arrangements, conductor
- Junior Huskey – upright bass
- Charlie McCoy – vibraphone
- Doris Allen, Howard Carpenter, Marvin Chantry – viola
- Brenton Banks, Lillian Hunt, Martin Katahn, Sheldon Kurland – violin
