= Vinton (album) =

19th studio album of Bobby Vinton

Studio album by Bobby Vinton
- Released: June 1969
- Genre: Pop
- Label: Epic
- Producer: Billy Sherrill

Bobby Vinton chronology
I Love How You Love Me (1968)	Vinton (1969)	Bobby Vinton's Greatest Hits of Love (1969)

Singles from Vinton
- 1. "To Know You Is to Love You" Released: March 10, 1969; 2. "The Days of Sand and Shovels" Released: May 26, 1969; 3. "No Arms Can Ever Hold You" Released: June 10, 1970

Vinton was Bobby Vinton's nineteenth studio album, released in 1969. Vinton covered contemporary material on it. Three singles came from the album: "To Know You Is to Love You", "The Days of Sand and Shovels" and "No Arms Can Ever Hold You".

Cover versions include Herb Alpert's hit "This Guy's in Love with You", "When I Fall in Love", Tammy Wynette's hit "Stand by Your Man", "It's a Sin to Tell a Lie", "Try a Little Tenderness" and the McGuire Sisters' hit "May You Always".

== Track listing ==
Side 1
No.	Title	Writer(s)	Length
1.	"No Arms Can Ever Hold You"	Art Crafer, Jimmy Nebb	2:25
2.	"This Guy's in Love With You"	Burt Bacharach, Hal David	3:07
3.	"When I Fall in Love"	Edward Heyman, Victor Young	2:15
4.	"To Know You Is to Love You"	Phil Spector	2:21
5.	"Stand by Your Man"	Billy Sherrill, Tammy Wynette	2:35
6.	"It's a Sin to Tell a Lie"	Billy Mayhew	2:26

Side 2
No.	Title	Writer(s)	Length
1.	"The Days of Sand and Shovels"	Doyle Marsh, George Reneau	3:42
2.	"Try a Little Tenderness"	Harry M. Woods, Jimmy Campbell, Reginald Connelly	2:23
3.	"Middle of the Night"	Bobby Vinton, Gene Allan	2:17
4.	"Are You Sincere"	Wayne Walker	2:13
5.	"May You Always"	Larry Markes, Dick Charles	2:33

== Personnel ==
- Bobby Vinton - vocals
- Billy Sherrill - producer
- Bill Walker - arranger ("This Guy's in Love With You" and "May You Always")
- Bill McElhiney - arranger ("To Know You Is to Love You" and "The Days of Sand and Shovels")
- Bob Golden - cover photo

== Charts ==
Chart (1969)	Peak position
Billboard Top LPs	69

Singles

Year	Single	Chart	Position
1969	"To Know You Is to Love You"	The Billboard Hot 100	34
1969	"The Days of Sand and Shovels"	The Billboard Hot 100	34
1970	"No Arms Can Ever Hold You"	The Billboard Hot 100	93
