= The Coronets =

British vocal group

- Origin: United Kingdom
- Genres: Pop, folk
- Years active: 1953–1957
- Past members: Valerie Tyler (soprano); Marion Gay/Irene King (alto); Ross Gilmour (tenor); Bill Shepherd (baritone); Gerry Laine/Mike Sammes (bass)

The Coronets were a British vocal group active in the mid-1950s.

== History ==
The group was formed in June 1953 by Bill Shepherd and Valerie Tyler, who were both members of the George Mitchell Minstrels at the time, and who hit upon the idea for a new group while on a train from Birmingham to London. The inspiration for the group's name was the Coronation and they commissioned a quintet of coronets for wearing in performance.

The group's break came when they were featured for four months on the Midday Music Hall radio programme towards the end of 1953, making their television debut in October on the Shop Window programme, and were invited to provide a song for a Goons film.

The Coronets were mostly back-up singers on the Columbia label, and performed on cheap budget label cover versions, but did record a number of singles under their own name. One of them - "Brown Eyes - Why Are You Blue?" - saw the group record each vocal part twice, to make a 10-part harmony.

Original bass singer Gerry Laine was replaced by Mike Sammes in 1954. In September 1955, Marion Gay had to step away from the group, as she was pregnant; Irene King was recruited from The Keynotes as a replacement.

By 1957, Sammes was more interested in American harmonies and a more contemporary sound, and formed the Mike Sammes Singers, and Shepherd had become the musical director at Pye Nixa; as a result, the Coronets ceased to exist. Shepherd managed a varying line-up known as "the Coronet Singers", which later became known simply as the Bill Shepherd Singers.

The group had two singles which made the New Musical Express singles charts, both in 1955; one single which did not make the NME charts, "Don't Go to Strangers", backing Ronnie Harris, was at number 9 in the first Record Mirror chart on 22 January 1955, and peaked at 8 a week later.

== Charting singles ==
- "Don't Go to Strangers" (Ronnie Harris with the Coronets): Record Mirror no. 8, January 1955
- "That's How a Love Song Was Born" (Ray Burns with the Coronets): NME no. 14, August 1955
- "Twenty Tiny Fingers": NME no. 20=, November 1955
