= I Love How You Love Me (album) =

Studio album by Bobby Vinton
- Released: December 1968
- Genre: Pop
- Label: Epic
- Producer: Billy Sherrill

Bobby Vinton chronology
Take Good Care of My Baby (1968)	I Love How You Love Me (1968)	Vinton (1969)

I Love How You Love Me was Bobby Vinton's eighteenth studio album, released in 1968. The title track was previously a major hit for the Paris Sisters in 1961.

Two singles came from this album: the title track, which reached No. 9 in the United States and "Halfway to Paradise" (US #23, previously a hit for Tony Orlando and Billy Fury). Cover versions include "Those Were the Days", "Till", "For Once in My Life", "Why Don't You Believe Me" and the Drifters' hit "Save the Last Dance for Me".

The album cover photo features Vinton receiving a hug from Susan Szasz. She was the winner of a contest run by Epic Records to become the cover girl of a Bobby Vinton album.

== Track listing ==
Side 1
No.	Title	Writer(s)	Length
1.	"I Love How You Love Me"	Barry Mann, Larry Kolber	2:28
2.	"If I Didn't Care"	Jack Lawrence	2:35
3.	"Shangri-La"	Matty Malneck, Robert Maxwell, Carl Sigman	2:12
4.	"Those Were the Days"	Gene Raskin	4:03
5.	"It's No Sin"	George Hoven, Chester R. Shull	2:31

Side 2
No.	Title	Writer(s)	Length
1.	"For Once in My Life"	Ron Miller, Orlando Murden	2:57
2.	"Halfway to Paradise"	Gerry Goffin, Carole King	2:39
3.	"Why Don't You Believe Me"	Lew Douglas, King Laney, Roy Rodde	2:07
4.	"Till"	Carl Sigman, Charles Danvers	2:55
5.	"Together"	J. Gold	2:04
6.	"Save the Last Dance for Me"	Doc Pomus, Mort Shuman	2:34

== Personnel ==
- Bobby Vinton - vocals
- Billy Sherrill - producer
- Bill McElhiney - arranger ("Those Were the Days", "For Once in My Life", "Till" and "Save the Last Dance for Me")
- Don Tweedy - arranger ("Together")
- Suzanne Szasz - cover photo

== Charts ==
Chart (1968)	Peak position
Billboard Top LPs	21

Singles - Billboard (North America)

Year	Single	Chart	Position
1968	"Halfway to Paradise"	The Billboard Hot 100	23
1968	"I Love How You Love Me"	The Billboard Hot 100	9
1968	"I Love How You Love Me"	Billboard Easy Listening	2
