= Joel Sill =

American music producer (1946–2025)

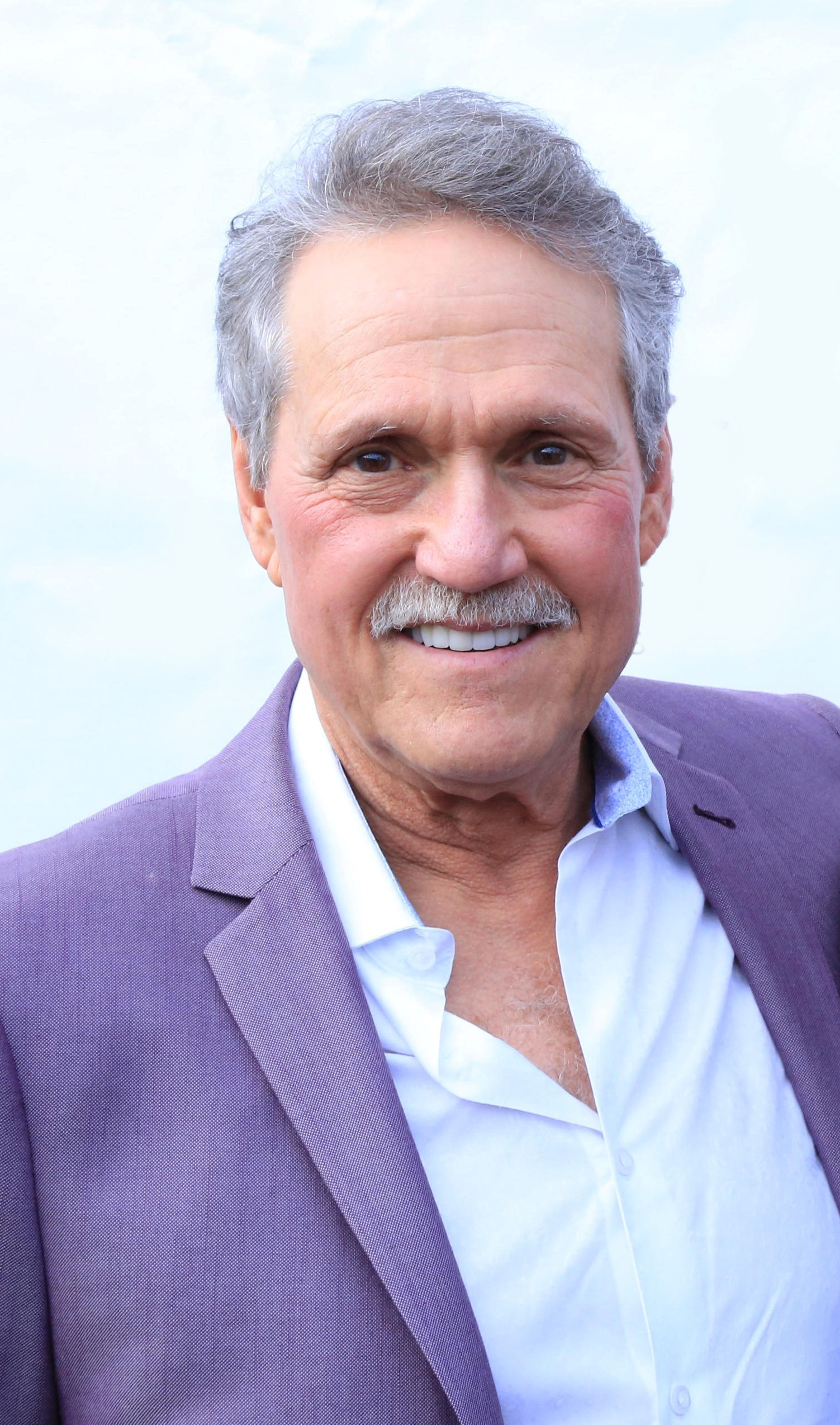
- Sill in 2018
- Born: November 24, 1946; Santa Monica, California, U.S.
- Died: August 23, 2025 (aged 78)
- Education: Los Angeles Pierce College
- Occupations: Music supervisor; music producer; consultant
- Spouse: Kimberly Sill
- Parents: Lester Sill; Harriet Sill
- Relatives: Greg Sill (brother); Lonnie Sill (brother); Chuck Kaye (half brother)

Joel Sill (November 24, 1946 – August 23, 2025) was an American music supervisor, music producer and consultant, known for his work on the films Forrest Gump, Cast Away and Terminator 3: Rise of the Machines, The Goonies, Blade Runner, The Color Purple, and My Cousin Vinny.

== Background ==
Joel Sill was born in Santa Monica, California, on November 24, 1946, to Lester Sill, a record label executive, and his wife, Harriet; of three brothers, Chuck Kaye (half brother), Greg and Lonnie Sill. Only Lonnie is surviving. Both were music supervisors. Chuck Kaye was a revered music publisher.

Sill graduated in 1964 from Grant High School, and received an Associate of Arts degree from Los Angeles Pierce College in 1974.

Sill's wife, Kimberly Sill, started and runs Shelter Hope Pet Shop, a humane pet shop. She has adopted over 16,000 dogs to new homes. She also directed the documentary film Saved in America, co-produced with Sill.

Sill died on August 23, 2025, at the age of 78, after battling pulmonary fibrosis.

== Career ==
Sill's first job in the music industry was for the Big Three Music Publishing Company aka Robbins, Feist and Miller, which he joined in 1967. From 1968 to 1969, Sill worked for Irving Almo Music (A&M Records publishing company) and in 1969 went on to work for Dunhill Records producing his first soundtrack for the film Easy Rider.

In 1972, Sill was hired by Clive Davis of Columbia Records as a producer. In 1975, Sill returned to work for Irving Almo Music where he stayed until he was offered a position at Paramount Pictures in 1980 as the vice president of music, overseeing and designing music for films, including An Officer and a Gentleman and Flashdance. Theme songs from both films – "Up Where We Belong" and "Flashdance... What a Feeling" went on to win an Academy Award for Best Original Song.

In 1984, Sill became vice president of music for Warner Bros. Films for all filmed entertainment. At Warner, Sill oversaw the music for films such as Mad Max Beyond Thunderdome,The Killing Fields, Blade Runner, Purple Rain, The Color Purple, and first introduced Madonna's music to film in Vision Quest with the song "Crazy for You".

In 1987, Sill partnered with director Taylor Hackford in the New Visions Music Group, where he supervised music for the film Mannequin, which included a number-one hit song "Nothing's Gonna Stop Us Now"; as well as the film La Bamba, which produced the number-one single "La Bamba", the five‐time multi-platinum soundtrack album by Los Lobos.

In 1989, and for the next ten years, Sill partnered with his half brother, Chuck Kaye, who was previously the chairman of Warner Chappell Music, to form Windswept Pacific a joint venture with Pacific Music of Fuji Sankei Communications. They purchased the Big 7 music publishing catalog from Morris Levy which included the music from over 100 gold records. During this time, Sill supervised the music for the films The Fabulous Baker Boys,The Firm, Twister, Forrest Gump (8 x multiplatinum), Terminator 3: Rise of the Machines, Contact, Castaway and Munich.

In 2002, Nigel Sinclair hired Sill and Bill Curbishley, former manager of The Who and Jimi Hendrix to start Intermedia Films Music Group. They had offices in Los Angeles and London and produced the soundtracks for K19: The Widowmaker, Adaptation, and Mariah Carey's Wise Girls. From 2004 to 2012, Sill formed a joint venture with Cherry Lane/BMG Music. Cherry Lane was founded in 1960 by renowned producer/arranger Milt Okun, who oversaw an extensive catalog of songs from Elvis Presley, John Denver, Quincy Jones and Ashford & Simpson, Black Eyed Peas and John Legend.

During the mid-1970s, Sill became a published underwater photographer represented by Jacques Cousteau's Living Sea Corporation. He remained an active scuba diver, photographer, and advocate for the oceans. He was working as an Ambassador for AltaSea, an ocean preservation and education non-profit in San Pedro, California.

== Awards and nominations ==
- 2019 Legacy Award – Winner – The Guild of Music Supervisors Awards
- 1992 Film Independent Spirit Award – Nominee – Best Film Music – Hangin' with the Homeboys

== Selected works ==
- 2024 – Here – music supervisor
- 2019 – Dave Grusin: Not Enough Time (documentary) – co-producer
- 2018 – Mabel, Mabel, Tiger Trainer (documentary) – executive music producer
- 2017 – Shot – music supervisor
- 2016 – The Complete Singles: 50th Anniversary Collection – The Mamas & the Papas – producer
- 2016 – Live Another Day (documentary) – executive music producer
- 2015 – Saved in America (documentary short) – music supervisor, co-producer
- 2014 – A Group Called Smith/Minus-Plus – Smith – producer
- 2014 – Begin Again – music consultant
- 2013 – New Blood/No Sweat/More Than Ever – Blood – producer
- 2013 – So Undercover – music consultant
- 2012 – Bound by Flesh (documentary) – executive music producer
- 2012 – Smitty – executive music producer
- 2012 – The Woman in Black – music consultant
- 2010 – Let Me In (original score) – music consultant
- 2010 – Love Ranch - executive music producer
- 2010 – Behind the Burly Q (documentary) – executive music producer
- 2009 – Possession – music consultant
- 2008 – Space Chimps – music supervisor
- 2006 – Bobby – music supervisor, soundtrack producer
- 2005 – Early Steppenwolf/For Ladies Only – Steppenwolf – re-recording supervisor
- 2005 – Complete Anthology – The Mamas & the Papas – producer
- 2005 – Munich – music consultant
- 2005 – Enfants Terribles – music supervisor
- 2005 – Mindhunters – music supervisor
- 2004 – Home and Away: The Complete Recordings 1960–1970 – Del Shannon – producer
- 2004 – Alexander (original motion picture soundtrack) – music executive
- 2004 – Suspect Zero – executive music producer
- 2003 – Terminator 3: Rise of the Machines – executive producer, executive music producer
- 2003 – Basic – executive music producer
- 2003 – Masked and Anonymous – Bob Dylan – executive music producer
- 2002 – Dark Blue – executive music producer
- 2002 – Showtime – music supervisor
- 2002 – K-19: The Widowmaker (original motion picture score) – executive music producer
- 2002 – David Clayton-Thomas/Tequila Sunrise – David Clayton-Thomas – producer
- 2001 – The Singles+ – The Mamas & the Papas – producer
- 2001 – Bandits – executive music producer
- 2000 – Cast Away – music consultant
- 2000 – The Adventures of Rocky & Bullwinkle – executive music producer
- 2000 – Return to Me – executive music producer
- 2000 – What Lies Beneath – music consultant
- 2000 – Liberty Heights (original soundtrack) – music supervisor
- 2000 – Flawless (original soundtrack) – executive music producer
- 1999 – Robert Zemeckis on Smoking, Drinking and Drugging in the 20th Century: In Pursuit of Happiness (TV movie documentary) – music supervisor
- 1998 – Dance with Me – executive music producer
- 1997 – Wag the Dog – music consultant: Tribeca
- 1997 – Contact – song wrangler
- 1997 – Speed 2: Cruise Control – music consultant
- 1996 – Striptease – executive music producer
- 1996 – Twister (original score) – music supervisor
- 1995 – Something to Talk About – music consultant
- 1995 – Free Willy 2: The Adventure Home – music consultant
- 1994 – Forrest Gump – executive music producer, soundtrack executive producer
- 1994 – The Endless Summer ll (documentary) – executive music producer
- 1994 – Lightning Jack – music consultant
- 1993 – Free Willy – music consultant
- 1993 – Flesh and Bone – music consultant
- 1993 – The Firm (original motion picture soundtrack) – music consultant
- 1992 – My Cousin Vinny – music consultant
- 1991 – Hangin' with the Homeboys – executive music producer
- 1991 – For the Boys – Bette Midler – executive music producer
- 1990 – White Palace – executive music producer
- 1990 – Coupe de Ville – executive music producer
- 1990 – Rock Artifacts, Vol. 1 – Sweathog – producer
- 1990 – Greatest Hits [Rhino] – Del Shannon – producer
- 1989 – The Fabulous Baker Boys – executive music producer
- 1989 – Music, My Love – Jean-Pierre Rampal – producer
- 1989 – Licence to Kill – executive soundtrack producer, music consultant
- 1989 – Rooftops – executive music producer
- 1989 – Tap – executive music producer
- 1988 – Everybody's All-American – music supervisor
- 1988 – Bright Lights, Big City – executive music producer
- 1987 – Mannequin – music supervisor
- 1987 – Overboard – music consultant
- 1987 – La Bamba – executive music producer
- 1986 – First and Goal (Wildcats) – music supervisor
- 1986 – 'Round Midnight – music supervisor
- 1986 – Club Paradise – music supervisor
- 1986 – Little Shop of Horrors – executive in charge of music
- 1986 – The Clan of the Cave Bear – executive in charge of music
- 1985 – The Color Purple – executive in charge of music
- 1985 – Vision Quest - executive in charge of music
- 1985 – The Goonies – executive in charge of music
- 1985 – Follow That Bird – Sesame Street – executive music producer
- 1985 – American Flyers – executive in charge of music
- 1985 – Krush Groove – executive in charge of music
- 1985 – Spies Like Us – executive in charge of music
- 1985 – Revolution – executive in charge of music
- 1985 – Mishima: A Life in Four Chapters – executive in charge of music
- 1985 – Seven Minutes in Heaven – executive in charge of music
- 1985 – Pee-Wee's Big Adventure – executive in charge of music
- 1985 – National Lampoon's European Vacation – executive in charge of music
- 1985 – Mad Max Beyond Thunderdome – executive in charge of music
- 1985 – Police Academy 2: Their First Assignment – executive in charge of music
- 1985 – Ladyhawke – executive in charge of music
- 1985 – Lost in America – executive in charge of music
- 1985 – Fandango – executive in charge of music
- 1984 – The Neverending Story – executive in charge of music
- 1984 – Protocol – executive in charge of music
- 1984 – Oh, God! You Devil – executive in charge of music
- 1984 – The Little Drummer Girl – executive in charge of music
- 1984 – Irreconcilable Differences – executive in charge of music
- 1984 – The Killing Fields – executive in charge of music
- 1984 – Gremlins – executive in charge of music
- 1984 – Finders Keepers – executive in charge of music
- 1984 – Purple Rain – executive in charge of music
- 1984 – Lassiter – executive in charge of music
- 1984 – Swing Shift – executive in charge of music
- 1984 – Greystoke: The Legend of Tarzan, Lord of the Apes – executive in charge of music
- 1984 – Police Academy – executive in charge of music
- 1984 – Footloose – executive in charge of music
- 1983 – Trading Places – executive in charge of music
- 1983 – Deal of the Century – executive in charge of music
- 1983 – Terms of Endearment – executive in charge of music
- 1983 – Staying Alive – executive in charge of music
- 1983 – Baby It's You – executive in charge of music
- 1983 – Flashdance (original source score) – executive in charge of music
- 1983 – The Lords of Discipline – executive in charge of music
- 1983 – The Keep – executive in charge of music
- 1983 – Testament – music supervisor
- 1982 – 48 hours – executive in charge of music
- 1982 – White Dog – executive in charge of music
- 1982 – An Officer and a Gentleman – executive in charge of music
- 1982 – Star Trek II: The Wrath of Khan – executive in charge of music
- 1982 – Some Kind of Hero – executive in charge of music
- 1982 – Deadly Games – executive in charge of music
- 1982 – I'm Dancing as Fast as I Can – executive in charge of music
- 1981 – Raiders of the Lost Ark – executive in charge of music
- 1981 – Paternity – executive in charge of music
- 1981 – Mommie Dearest – executive in charge of music
- 1981 – Dragon Slayer – executive in charge of music
- 1981 – Reds – executive in charge of music
- 1980 – Animalympics – music supervisor
- 1979 – Steel – music supervisor
- 1979 – Hart to Hart (TV series) – music consultant
- 1979 – J-Men Forever – recorded score producer
- 1978 – The Big Fix – music supervisor
- 1977 – First Love – music supervisor: soundtrack/musical director
- 1976 – Mother, Jugs & Speed – music score producer
- 1976 – Tropea – John Tropea – cover photo
- 1975 – Katherine (TV movie) – music score producer: Almo Music
- 1973 – Go Ask Alice (TV movie) – music producer: Almo Productions
- 1972 – Fat City – music supervisor (uncredited)
- 1971 – The Last Picture Show – music consultant (uncredited)
- 1971 – Prairie Madness – Prairie Madness – producer
- 1970 – Flying Ahead – Atlee Yeager – producer
- 1970 – Lovers and Other Strangers – executive in charge of music (uncredited)
- 1970 – Lancelot Link and the Evolution Revolution – Lancelot Link & The Evolution Revolution – producer
- 1969 – Sunshower – Thelma Houston – producer
- 1969 – Minus-Plus – Smith – producer
- 1969 – A Group Called Smith – Smith – producer, composer
- 1969 – Easy Rider – coordination and production
- 1964 – Kustom City U.S.A. – Kustom Kings – producer
