= Take Good Care of My Baby (Bobby Vinton album) =

Studio album by Bobby Vinton
- Released: May 15, 1968
- Genre: Pop
- Label: Epic
- Producer: Billy Sherrill

Bobby Vinton chronology
Please Love Me Forever (1968)	Take Good Care of My Baby (1968)	I Love How You Love Me (1968)

Professional ratings
Review scores
Source	Rating
Allmusic	3/5 stars

Take Good Care of My Baby was Bobby Vinton's seventeenth studio album, released in 1968. The title track was previously a hit for Bobby Vee. Other cover versions include "I Apologize" and "Serenade of the Bells". The title track is the album's most successful single. "Sentimental Me" was also released as a single and was awarded the Top Song Award by the American Jukebox Association in 1968.

== Track listing ==
Side 1
No.	Title	Writer(s)	Length
1.	"Take Good Care of My Baby"	Gerry Goffin, Carole King	2:45
2.	"I Apologize"	Al Hoffman, Al Goodhart, Ed Nelson	2:36
3.	"To Think You've Chosen Me"	Bennie Benjamin, George David Weiss	2:22
4.	"My Way of Life"	Sonny Curtis	2:18
5.	"Heaven's Gonna Miss You"	Ben Peters	2:32

Side 2
No.	Title	Writer(s)	Length
1.	"Sentimental Me"	Jimmy Cassin, Jim Morehead	2:19
2.	"To Be Alone"	Bill Vaughan	2:54
3.	"Serenade of the Bells"	Al Goodhart, Alfred Urbano, Kay Twomey	2:38
4.	"Gone (From My Heart)"	Smokey Rogers	2:13
5.	"Forget Me Not"	Billy Sherrill, Glenn Sutton	2:30
6.	"Little Barefoot Boy"	Bobby Vinton, Gene Allan	2:22

== Personnel ==
- Bobby Vinton – vocals
- Billy Sherrill – producer

== Charts ==
Album – Billboard (North America)

Year	Chart	Position
1968	The Billboard 200	164

Singles – Billboard (North America)

Year	Single	Chart	Position
1968	"Take Good Care of My Baby"	The Billboard Hot 100	33
