= Ray Burns (singer) =

English singer (1923–2000)

- Born: Reuben Klot; 1 April 1923; London, England
- Died: 9 December 2000 (aged 77)
- Genres: Pop
- Occupation: Singer
- Years active: 1940s–1950s
- Labels: Columbia Records

Reuben Burns (born Reuben Klot; 1 April 1923 – 9 December 2000), known professionally as Ray Burns, was a British singer who achieved notability in the 1950s, scoring a top five hit single in 1955.

== Early life ==
Burns was born of Russian ancestry as Reuben Klot in the East End of London, England, in 1923. He was Jewish, and the uncle of the singer Georgia Brown. Prior to the Second World War, he was as a leading member of the Brady Boys Concert Party, Britain's first Jewish boys' club. During the Second World War, he served in the Royal Air Force.

== Singing career ==
Burns entered showbusiness when a friend of the comedian Issy Bonn heard him singing in a barber shop; Bonn took Burns on as a dresser, taught him singing techniques, and had him perform a song during his stage shows. Burns' career took a step forward in 1949, when the orchestra leader Ambrose heard him sing at the Blue Lagoon club in London and offered him a job.

Burns was a regular singer with the BBC Show Band, under the leadership of Cyril Stapleton, in the 1950s, and recorded a number of singles for Columbia Records between 1953 and 1958, two of which reached the UK singles chart. The bigger hit, a cover of the David Holt/Bob Wells song "Mobile" (with the Eric Jupp Orchestra), which had been a hit in the United States for Julius La Rosa, reached number 4 in both the New Musical Express and Record Mirror charts in March 1955. The second, "That's How a Love Song Was Born" (with The Coronets), reached number 14 in the NME chart later in the year; at the time Record Mirror only had a top 10 chart, expanding to a top 20 in October 1955, just as the single dropped out of the NME top 20.

Burns' career turned to cabaret and smaller scale performances as the musical scene changed, but he made one final television appearance on Barrymore in the 1990s.

== Personal life ==
Burns married Tilly Gegendorf in Stepney in 1944. They had two children, Larry and Gillian. The latter performed with her father in a double act in the 1970s, and won an episode of New Faces in 1977.
