= The Days of Sand and Shovels =

1999 single by Waylon Jennings

Single by Waylon Jennings

from the album The Best of Waylon Jennings
- B-side: "Delia's Gone"
- Released: April 1969
- Genre: Country
- Label: RCA Victor
- Songwriters: Doyle Marsh; George Reneau

Waylon Jennings singles chronology
"Something's Wrong in California" (1969)	"The Days of Sand and Shovels" (1969)	"Brown Eyed Handsome Man" (1969)

"The Days of Sand and Shovels"

Single by Bobby Vinton

from the album Vinton
- B-side: "So Many Lonely Girls"
- Released: May 26, 1969
- Recorded: 1969
- Genre: Pop
- Label: Epic
- Songwriters: Doyle Marsh; George Reneau

Bobby Vinton singles chronology
"To Know You Is to Love You" (1969)	"The Days of Sand and Shovels" (1969)	"No Arms Can Ever Hold You" (1970)

"The Days of Sand and Shovels" is a song written by Doyle Marsh and George Reneau, and recorded by American country music artist Waylon Jennings. It was released in April 1969 as the second single from his compilation album The Best of Waylon Jennings. The song peaked at number 20 on the Billboard Hot Country Singles chart. It also reached number 1 on the RPM Country Tracks chart in Canada.

"The Days of Sand and Shovels" was released as a single in 1969 by Bobby Vinton. Vinton's version spent 8 weeks on the Billboard Hot 100, reaching No. 34, while reaching No. 11 on Billboard's Easy Listening chart, No. 16 on Canada's RPM 100, and No. 13 on RPM's Adult Contemporary chart.

Nat Stuckey released a cover of the song in 1978. His version peaked at number 26 on the Billboard Hot Country Singles chart.

== Chart performance ==
=== Waylon Jennings ===
Chart (1969)	Peak position
US Hot Country Songs (Billboard)	20
Canadian RPM Country Tracks	1

=== Bobby Vinton ===
Chart (1969)	Peak position
US Billboard Hot 100	34
U.S. Billboard Easy Listening	11
Canada - RPM 100	16
Canada - RPM Adult Contemporary	13

=== Nat Stuckey ===
Chart (1978)	Peak position
US Hot Country Songs (Billboard)	26
Canadian RPM Country Tracks	29
