= Studio 2 Stereo Records =

Studio 2 Stereo Records is an audiophile label founded by EMI in 1965, which was first operated under EMI's Columbia label. The label was distributed in Canada by Capitol Records. The label issued easy listening and light classical music. In 1973, the Columbia imprint was replaced by the EMI Records imprint on Studio 2 Stereo releases. It also issued quadrophonic albums in the 1970s. Its main rival was Phase 4 Stereo, operated by the British Decca Records.
