= Love Is Love (Barry Ryan song) =

1969 single by Barry Ryan

Single by Barry Ryan
- B-side: "I'll Be on My Way Dear"
- Released: 7 February 1969
- Genre: Baroque pop; progressive pop
- Length: 4:47
- Label: MGM
- Songwriter: Paul Ryan
- Producer: Bill Landis

Barry Ryan singles chronology
"Eloise" (1968)	"Love Is Love" (1969)	"The Colour of My Love" (1969)

"Love Is Love" is a song by Barry Ryan, released as a single in February 1969. It was written by his brother Paul Ryan and arranged by Johnny Arthey.

== Release and reception ==
"Love Is Love" was released as the follow-up single to the worldwide hit "Eloise". Like with "Eloise", "Love Is Love" was released as "Barry Ryan with the Majority". It continued Ryan's success in continental Europe, becoming a top-ten hit in several countries. However, it was not as successful in the UK, where it only peaked at number 25 on the UK Singles Chart. By August 1969, the record had sold a million copies worldwide.

On why "Love Is Love" wasn't as successful in the UK, Barry said "I think it was too soon and too similar" to "Eloise". However, on the similarity between the two songs, Paul said "they're not that alike anyway, simply that there's the big build up and a break in the middle. If 'Love is Love' was released first it could have been the number one, then people would have said 'Eloise' was a copy of it".

Reviewing for New Musical Express, Derek Johnson described "Love Is Love" as "an incredible disc, and one that could provide Barry Ryan with a second No. 1. His urgent attacking vocal is encased in a scintillating Johnny Arthey scoring that's semi-symphonic in form. The tempo and mood are constantly changing (making it difficult to dance to), but specially prominent are the catchy hook-line chorus and the powerhouse rhythm with its classical Russian influence. No less than 53 people were involved in the backing – and it sounds like it. A shattering wall of sound that, in spite of this, is also controlled and tuneful. Exciting, dynamic, palpitating. Peter Jones for Record Mirror wrote "everything, but everything, is thrown into this. Semi-classical string-section phrases, moments of near falsetto by Barry, moments of screaming power, big brass figures, stacks of choral voices and changes of mood. Okay, so there is a lack of continuity, as has been pointed out to me, but the whole thing is in a class of its own as a massive pop production". For Melody Maker, Chris Welch wrote that "this reminds me of a cross between "2001", "Sparticus", Jim Webb and Richard Harris, the Four Tops, the Leningrad Symphony, the Isle of Man T.T. races, Titov's sensational space voyage in the Russian spacecraft Vodka III [sic] and the conquest of the Old West".

"Love Is Love" was planned for release as a single in the US, however in the end it remained unissued. Ryan also recorded a Spanish-language version titled "Amor es amor", which became a hit in Spain.

== Track listing ==
7": MGM / MGM 1464

1. "Love Is Love" – 4:47
2. "I'll Be on My Way Dear" – 3:11

== Charts ==
Chart (1969)	Peak position
Australia (Kent Music Report)	45
Austria (Ö3 Austria Top 40)	11
Belgium (Ultratop 50 Flanders)	2
Belgium (Ultratop 50 Wallonia)	1
Finland (Suomen virallinen lista)	31
France (SNICOP)	16
Germany (GfK)	4
Netherlands (Dutch Top 40)	8
Netherlands (Single Top 100)	7
Spain (PROMUSICAE)	13
Switzerland (Schweizer Hitparade)	6
UK Singles (Official Charts)	25
