= Halfway to Paradise =

1961 single by Tony Orlando

Single by Billy Fury

from the album Halfway to Paradise
- B-side: "Cross My Heart"
- Released: 28 April 1961
- Recorded: 9 April 1961
- Studio: Decca Studios, London
- Genre: Pop
- Length: 2:24
- Label: Decca
- Songwriters: Carole King; Gerry Goffin
- Producers: Dick Rowe; Mike Smith

Billy Fury singles chronology
"Don't Worry" (1961)	"Halfway to Paradise" (1961)	"Jealousy" (1961)

"Halfway to Paradise" is a popular song written by Carole King and Gerry Goffin. In the United States, the song was originally recorded in 1961 by Tony Orlando where it peaked at No. 39 on the Hot 100. In Canada, the song reached No. 3 in the CHUM Charts. The song reached no. 8 on the New Zealand lever hit parade charts

== Billy Fury version ==
"Halfway to Paradise" was recorded by Billy Fury with Fury's version reaching No.3 on the British singles chart in 1961 and remaining on the chart for 23 weeks. It became the tenth best-selling single of 1961 in the UK . "Halfway to Paradise" became known as Fury's signature tune and was one of his most popular singles.

Fury's single was a big production for both Fury and Decca and involved a whole orchestra, conducted by Ivor Raymonde. Its success made Fury known for his big ballad numbers, although he began in rock and roll and was always thought of more as a rock musician. The song also marked the beginning of Fury's burst at the top of the charts that would only begin to slow down on the arrival of fellow Liverpudlian act, the Beatles.

== Later versions ==
- Backed with her own composition, "I Can't Believe in Miracles", English singer Barbara Ruskin had her version released in the UK on Piccadilly 7N 35224 in the UK, and on ABC Paramount 10657 in the US in May, 1965. Given a B+ rating in the Cash Box Best Bets section and referring to her performance on the song as "Lustrous vocal work", a nice following for Ruskin's single was predicted by the magazine.
- In 1968, Bobby Vinton revived "Halfway to Paradise" in a mellow, more romantic version. This recording went to No. 23 on the Hot 100, No. 8 on the Easy Listening chart, and No. 17 in Canada. The song was included on the million-selling album "I Love How You Love Me" in early 1969.
- Tina Charles recorded the song for her album Dance Little Lady (1976).
- Nick Lowe released "Halfway to Paradise" as a single in 1977 (backed with "I Don't Want the Night to End", STIFF Records, BUY 21), remaking into a post-punk power ballad, but without any real chart impact. It was later released as a bonus track on the re-release of his 1978 album Jesus of Cool.
- Australian singer Jason Donovan recorded his version of the song for his album Let It Be Me (2008).
