= The Paris Sisters =

1960s American girl group

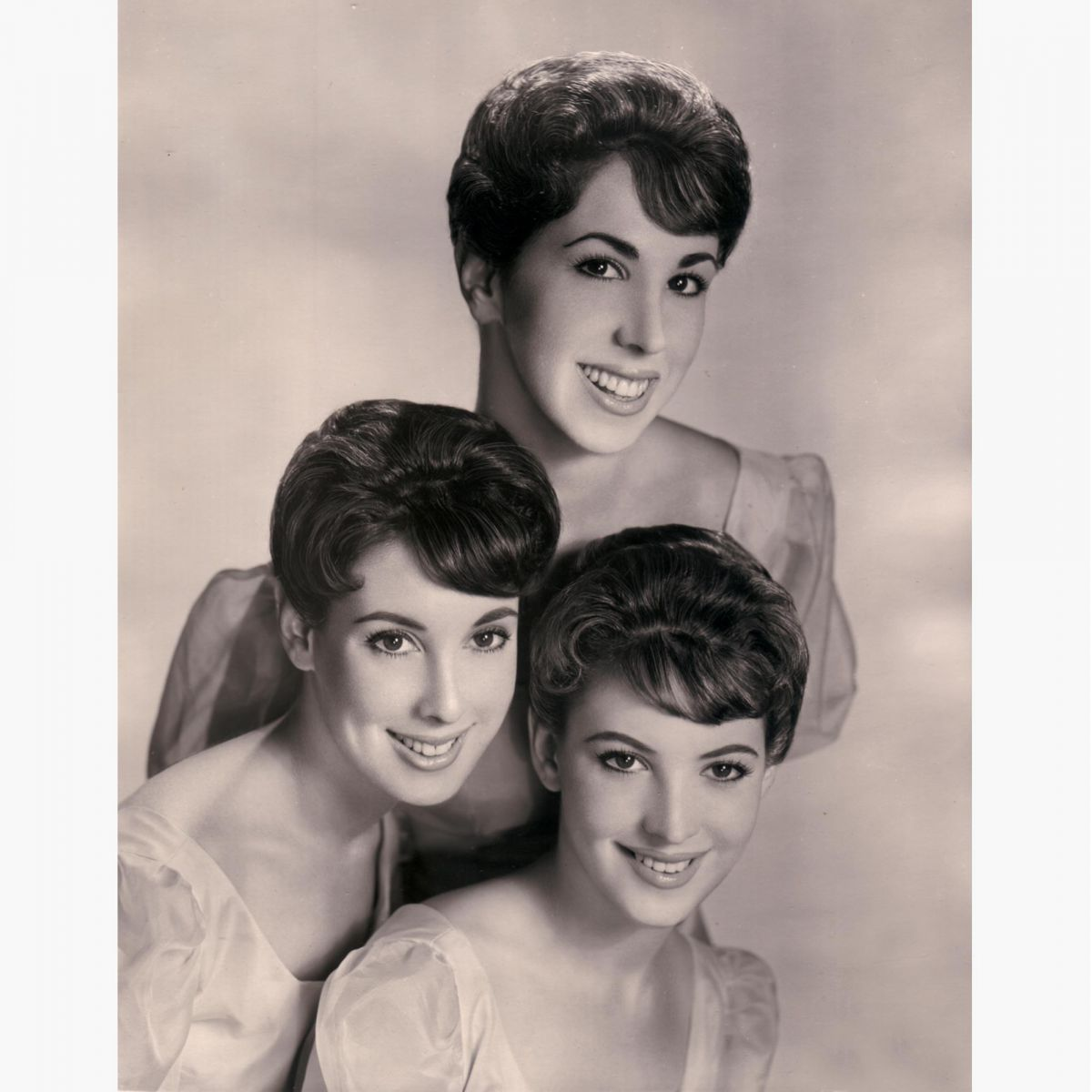
- The Paris Sisters in 1961

Background information
- Origin: San Francisco, California, United States
- Genre: Pop
- Years active: 1954–1968
- Labels: Decca; Imperial; Gregmark; MGM; Mercury; Reprise; Capitol; Sidewalk
- Past members: Priscilla Paris; Albeth Paris; Sherrell Paris

The Paris Sisters were a 1960s American girl group from San Francisco, best known for their work with record producer Phil Spector.

== Career ==
The group consisted of lead singer Priscilla Paris (January 4, 1945 – March 5, 2004), her older sister Albeth Carole Paris (October 16, 1935 - December 5, 2014), and their middle sister Sherrell Paris. They reached the peak of their success in October 1961 with the hit single "I Love How You Love Me", which peaked at No. 5 on the Billboard Hot 100 Chart, and sold over one million copies. Some of the group's other hit songs include the US Top 40 single "He Knows I Love Him Too Much" (March 1962, No. 34), "All Through The Night" (1961), "Be My Boy" (No. 56), "Let Me Be The One" (No. 87), and "Dream Lover" (No. 91).

The Paris Sisters appeared in the 1962 British rock film It's Trad, Dad! (released in the U.S. as Ring-a-Ding Rhythm) directed by Richard Lester. In the film, they performed the Spector-produced song "What Am I to Do?" Also early in the 1960s, the Paris Sisters sang the jingle for Diet Rite soda.

Sherrell Paris later served as a production assistant on The Price Is Right and as host Bob Barker's personal assistant until she retired in 2000.

Priscilla Paris died on March 5, 2004, from injuries suffered in a fall at her home in Pays de la Loire, France. She was 59.

Albeth Paris died in Palm Springs, California, on December 5, 2014. She was 79.

== Discography ==
=== Albums ===
- Sing From the Glass House, Unifilms Records (1966)
- Golden Hits of The Paris Sisters, Sidewalk Records (1967)
- Sing Everything Under The Sun, Reprise Records (1967)
- The Best of The Paris Sisters, Curb Records (2004)
- The Complete Phil Spector Sessions, Varèse Sarabande (2006)
- Always Heavenly, Ace Records (2016)

=== Singles ===
Year	Title	Peak chart positions		Record Label	B-side	Album
Year	Title	US Pop	US AC	Record Label	B-side	Album
1954	"Ooh La La"	—	—	Decca	"Whose Arms Are You Missing"	
1955	"Huckleberry Pie"	—	—	Decca	"Baby, Honey, Baby"	
1955	"The "Know-How""	—	—	Decca	"I Wanna"	
1955	"Lover Boy"	—	—	Decca	"Oh Yes, You Do"	
1956	"I Love You Dear (Year-Round Love)"	—	—	Decca	"Mistaken"	
1956	"Daughter, Daughter!"	—	—	Decca	"So Much - So Very Much"	
1957	"(Don't Stop, Don't Stop) Tell Me More"	—	—	Imperial	"Old Enough to Cry"	
1958	"Someday"	—	—	Imperial	"My Original Love"	
1958	"Don't Tell Anybody"	—	—	Decca	"Mind Reader"	
1961	"Be My Boy"	56	—	Gregmark	"I'll Be Crying Tomorrow"	
1961	"I Love How You Love Me"	5	—	Gregmark	"All Through the Night"	
1962	"He Knows I Love Him Too Much"	34	7	Gregmark	"A Lonely Girl's Prayer"	
1962	"Let Me Be the One"	87	—	Gregmark	"What Am I to Do"	
1962	"Yes - I Love You"	—	—	Gregmark	"Once Upon a While Ago"	
1964	"Dream Lover"	91	—	MGM	"Lonely Girl"	
1964	"When I Fall in Love"	—	—	Mercury	"Once Upon a Time"	
1965	"Why Do I Take It From You"	—	—	Mercury	"Always Waitin'"	
1966	"Sincerely"	—	—	Reprise	"Too Good to Be True"	The Paris Sisters Sing Everything Under the Sun!!!
1966	"I'm Me"	—	—	Reprise	"You"	The Paris Sisters Sing Everything Under the Sun!!!
1966	"My Good Friend"	—	—	Reprise	"It's My Party"	
1967	"Some of Your Lovin'"	—	—	Reprise	"Long After Tonight Is All Over"	The Paris Sisters Sing Everything Under the Sun!!!
1968	"Greener Days"	—	—	Capitol	"Golden Days"	
1968	"The Ugliest Girl in Town"	—	—	GNP Crescendo	"Stand Naked Clown"	
