= Columbia Graphophone Company =

Record company in the United Kingdom

- The company's "Columbia" trademark
- Parent company: Columbia Phonograph Company (1917–1922); EMI (20 April 1931 – January 1973); Universal Music Group (Australia and New Zealand); Warner Music Group (most catalogues)
- Founded: 13 February 1917; 109 years ago
- Defunct: January 1973; 53 years ago
- Status: Catalogue and artist roster owned by Parlophone Records outside Australasia since 2012, trademark and name sold to Sony Music in 1990
- Genre: Various
- Country of origin: United Kingdom

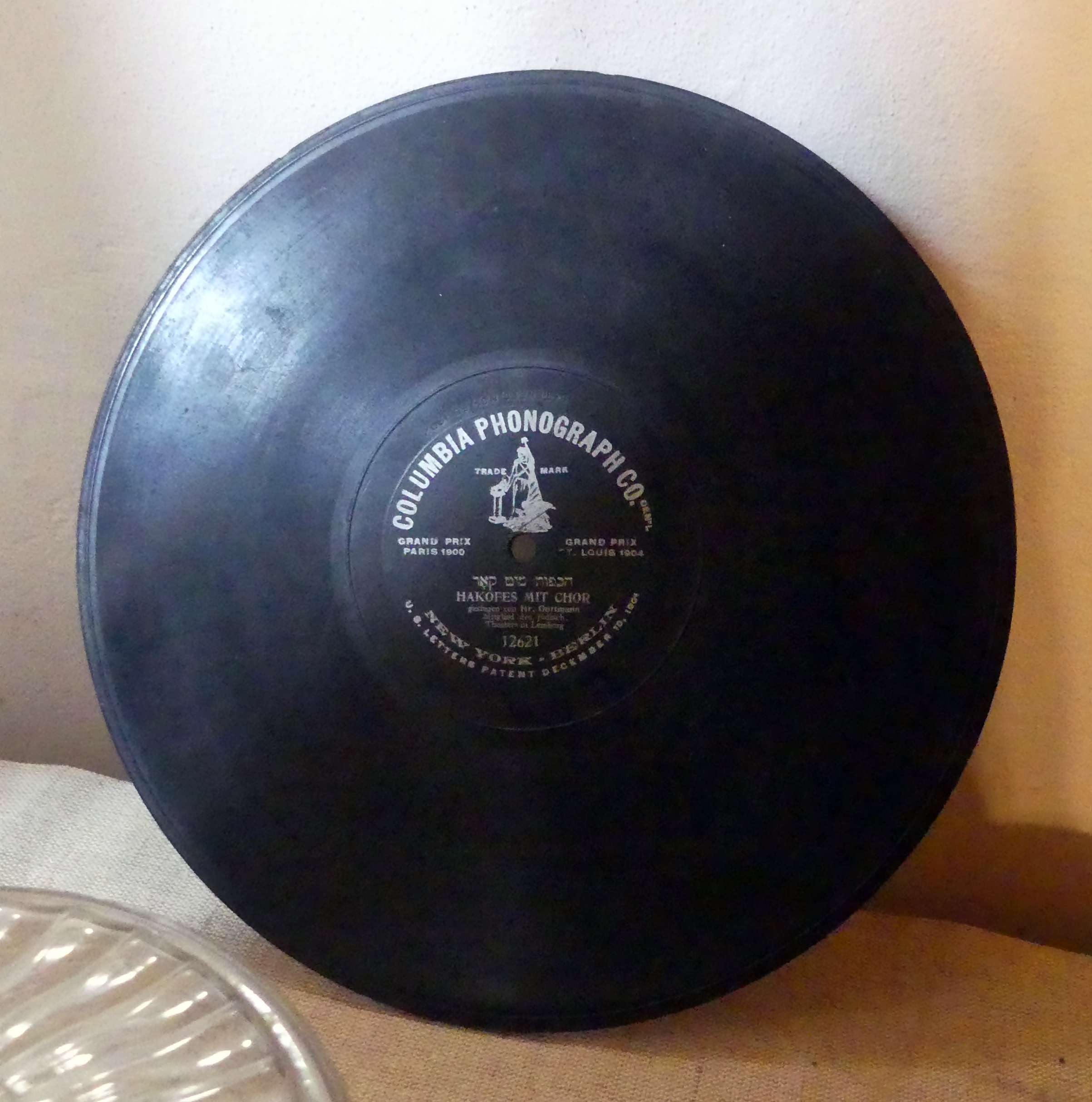
Columbia Phonograph Company, gramophone record

Columbia Graphophone Co. Ltd. was one of the earliest gramophone companies in the United Kingdom.

Founded in 1917 as an offshoot of the American Columbia Phonograph Company, it became an independent British-owned company in 1922 in a management buy-out after the parent company went into receivership.

In 1925, it acquired a controlling interest in its American parent company to take advantage of a new electrical recording process. The British firm also controlled the US operations from 1925 until 1931. That year Columbia Graphophone in the UK merged with the Gramophone Company (which sold records under their His Master's Voice label) to form EMI. At the same time, Columbia divested itself of its American branch, which was eventually absorbed by Columbia Broadcasting System (CBS) in 1938.

The company's record label Columbia became a successful British brand in the 1950s and 1960s, and was eventually replaced by the newly created EMI Records, as part of a label consolidation. This in turn was absorbed by the Parlophone Records unit of Warner Music Group in 2013.

== Early history ==
The Columbia Phonograph Company was originally founded in the US by Edward D. Easton in 1887, initially as a distributor with a local monopoly on sales and service of Edison phonographs and phonograph cylinders in Washington, D.C., Maryland, and Delaware. It also made its own compatible cylinder recordings. In 1901, Columbia began selling disc records (invented and patented by Emile Berliner of the Victor Talking Machine Company) and phonographs. For a decade, Columbia competed with both the Edison Phonograph Company cylinders and the Victor discs. Edison discs and Columbia's acoustic records both had a nominal playback speed of 80 rpm.

From about 1898 until 1922 the US parent company managed a UK subsidiary, the Columbia Graphophone Manufacturing Company. Its headquarters and studios were established in Victorian warehouses at 102-108 Clerkenwell Road shortly before the First World War, and the buildings were a key location in the development of the British recording industry until the 1930s. In 1917, the Columbia Graphophone Company was registered as a British company, with the shares being held by the American firm. A general market downturn in 1921 affected the whole entertainment industry. Profits turned to losses, and in late 1922 the creditors of the US parent company filed a petition for involuntary bankruptcy: Columbia went into receivership. Seeking to raise cash, Columbia sold the British branch in December 1922 to a group of investors led by Columbia's General Manager in Britain, the American-born Louis Sterling (1879–1958).

Columbia in the US emerged from receivership in February 1924 as the Columbia Phonograph Company Inc., but was immediately faced with another crisis, as booming radio sales reduced the firm's profitability. The same year, Bell Labs-Western Electric had developed a new electrical recording system to replace the old acoustic recording methods, and was offering exclusive rights to Victor although its Chairman's illness had led to delays. Louis Sterling as Managing Director had turned around the fortunes of UK Columbia, and persuaded Western Electric that granting a monopoly would be a grave mistake. Columbia had been making test electrical recordings since at least August 1924 with the Western Electric system. Although the Columbia Phonograph Company of New York could not afford the royalty payments, Sterling was in a position to buy out the US operation and, as an American company, to purchase the licence for the new Western Electric patents. Satisfied with the progress of the test recordings, in March 1925, Louis Sterling (backed by J.P. Morgan & Co.), acquired a controlling interest in the parent company, Columbia US, for $2.5 million (about £500,000) in order to take advantage of Western Electric's patents. The firm continued in business as the Columbia Graphophone Company in many countries as a British company. Sterling, originally from New York, became chairman of the US operation.

On 25 February 1925, Columbia began recording with the licensed Western Electric recording process and was using it on a regular basis by April. The royalty payments were considerable, and in 1928 Columbia hired the English electronics engineer Alan Blumlein to work on an alternative. By late 1930, he had developed a recording system including a moving-coil microphone and a cutting head with linear characteristics which circumvented Western Electric's patents. Columbia continued to use acoustic recording methods for the cheaper labels, and to release discs made with old acoustic masters on the Harmony and Velvet Tone labels until around 1929.

The repercussions of the stock market Crash of 1929 led to huge losses in the recording industry and, in March 1931, J.P Morgan, the major shareholder, steered the Columbia Graphophone Company (along with Odeon Records and Parlophone, which it had owned since 1926) into a merger with the Gramophone Company to form Electric and Musical Industries Ltd (EMI). By the time of the merger, the Gramophone Company had not fully developed an alternative to Western Electric's process and was still paying royalty fees, so it was a technically advantageous move.

Since the Gramophone Company was a wholly owned subsidiary of Victor, and Columbia in America was a subsidiary of UK Columbia, Victor now technically owned its largest rival in the US. To avoid antitrust legislation, EMI had to sell off its US Columbia operation, which continued to release pressings of matrices made in the UK. The American company was eventually absorbed by Columbia Broadcasting System (CBS) (another of its former offshoots) in 1938.

== As an EMI label ==
EMI continued to operate the Columbia record label in the UK until the early 1970s, and in all other territories except for the US, Canada, Spain and Japan, until it sold its remaining interest in the Columbia trademark to Sony Music Entertainment in 1990.

Under EMI, UK Columbia's releases were mainly licensed recordings from American Columbia until 1951 when American Columbia switched British distribution to Philips Records. UK Columbia continued to distribute American Columbia sister labels Okeh and Epic until 1968 when American Columbia's then parent CBS moved distribution of all its labels to the new CBS Records created from the purchase of Oriole Records (UK) in late 1964. The loss of American Columbia product had forced UK Columbia to groom its own talent such as Russ Conway, John Barry, Cliff Richard, the Shadows, Helen Shapiro, Frank Ifield, Freddie and the Dreamers, the Dave Clark Five, Shirley Bassey, Frankie Vaughan, Des O'Connor, Ken Dodd, the Animals, Herman's Hermits, Gerry and the Pacemakers, the Seekers, the Yardbirds, Jeff Beck, and Pink Floyd. Led by A&R man Norrie Paramor, the label was arguably the most successful in Britain in the rock era prior to the beat boom.

In the mid 1960s, UK Columbia added an audiophile imprint called Studio 2 Stereo. During that time, the Columbia Graphophone Company was absorbed into the Gramophone Company with the label maintaining its identity.

EMI engaged in litigation with CBS regarding the importing of American records bearing the Columbia imprint into areas where EMI owned the Columbia name.

Releases from the British Columbia Graphophone Company appeared in Japan under Nippon Columbia until 1962, when licensing was switched to Toshiba Musical Industries.

== Phaseout of label by EMI and trade mark transfer ==
EMI decided to reserve the His Master's Voice label for classical repertoire and had transferred His Master's Voice's remaining pop acts to Columbia and Parlophone by 1967. EMI began to replace the Columbia label with the eponymous EMI Records in January 1973. The last Columbia single was issued in 1989. EMI sold its remaining interest in the Columbia name in 1990 to Sony Music Entertainment (formerly CBS Records Group), which already owned Columbia Records in the U.S. and Canada. The formal reassignment of British registered trade marks from EMI, including the "magic notes" logo, took place in 1993.

For the Columbia Records trade mark in the UK and elsewhere, Sony Music now prefers the "walking eye" logo previously used by the old CBS Records, which is based on the Columbia Records logo introduced in the US and Canada in 1955. However, the "magic notes" logo is occasionally used, usually to give a 'retro' feel (such as on the 2016 vinyl reissues of Pink Floyd's Piper at the Gates of Dawn and A Saucerful of Secrets, and on Bob Dylan's Time Out of Mind).

The Columbia name was still on some EMI releases between 1973 and 1990 (such as Baltimora's "Tarzan Boy" in 1985, Jeanne Mas and the 1987 Kiki Dee album Angel Eyes), but it had ceased acting as a fully functioning label.

In Australia and Germany, EMI continued using the Columbia label throughout the 1970s and to at least 1980, but added the EMI label in 1973.

== Current ownership ==
Through its ownership of the former Columbia/EMI catalogue, Parlophone Records' new owner Warner Music Group assumed Columbia's artist roster and catalogue. New reissues bear the Parlophone imprint. Columbia's reissues, and by extension, those from His Master's Voice's popular genres, are distributed by WMG's Rhino Entertainment in the United States.

The Australian and New Zealand EMI Columbia catalogues, including recordings by John Farnham, who went by Johnny during his time with the label, were ceded to Universal Music Australia's imprint, EMI Recorded Music Australia, and Universal Music New Zealand respectively.

== See also ==
- Graphophone, a Bell name & trademark acquired by several US record firms
- List of Columbia Graphophone Company artists
- List of record labels
- Nippon Columbia, one-time Japanese affiliate
