= Paul Ryan (singer, born 1948) =

English musician (1948-1992)

- Born: Paul Sapherson; 24 October 1948; Leeds, West Riding of Yorkshire, England
- Died: 29 November 1992 (aged 44) London, England

Paul Ryan (born Paul Sapherson; 24 October 1948 – 29 November 1992) was an English musician and songwriter.

== Biography ==
=== Early life ===
Born in Leeds, West Riding of Yorkshire, England, Paul and his identical twin brother Barry were the sons of singer Marion Ryan.

=== Career ===
Ryan's success came as a singing duo, with his twin brother Barry Ryan during the 1960s, known simply as "Paul & Barry Ryan". However, the stress of public attention caused Paul to retreat into the background, while Barry went solo.

=== Later career ===
Paul Ryan wrote Barry's 1968 hit "Eloise", the 1971 hit "Who Put the Lights Out?" for Dana and another of his songs, "I Will Drink the Wine", was a top-20 hit on the UK Singles Chart for Frank Sinatra.

In the 1970s Ryan relocated to the United States, and in 1976 released an album, Scorpio Rising, but later left the music industry. After returning to the UK in 1985, he earned his living from operating a chain of hairdressing salons. The gothic punk band the Damned reached number 3 in the UK Singles Chart in 1986 with their cover version of "Eloise".

=== Death ===
Ryan died of lung cancer in 1992 in London at the age of 44.

== Songwriting credits ==
- "Eloise" – Barry Ryan
- "Love Is Love" – Barry Ryan
- "Who Put the Lights Out?" – Dana
- "I Will Drink the Wine" – Frank Sinatra, Joe Longthorne
- "The Colour of My Love" - Dalida, Jefferson, Barry Ryan
- "Love's Only Love" – Engelbert Humperdinck
- "Sunrise in the Morning" – Frank Sinatra

Both of the above Sinatra tracks appeared on his 1971 album Sinatra & Company.

== See also ==
- List of performers on Top of the Pops
