= Barry Ryan (singer) =

English pop singer (1948–2021)

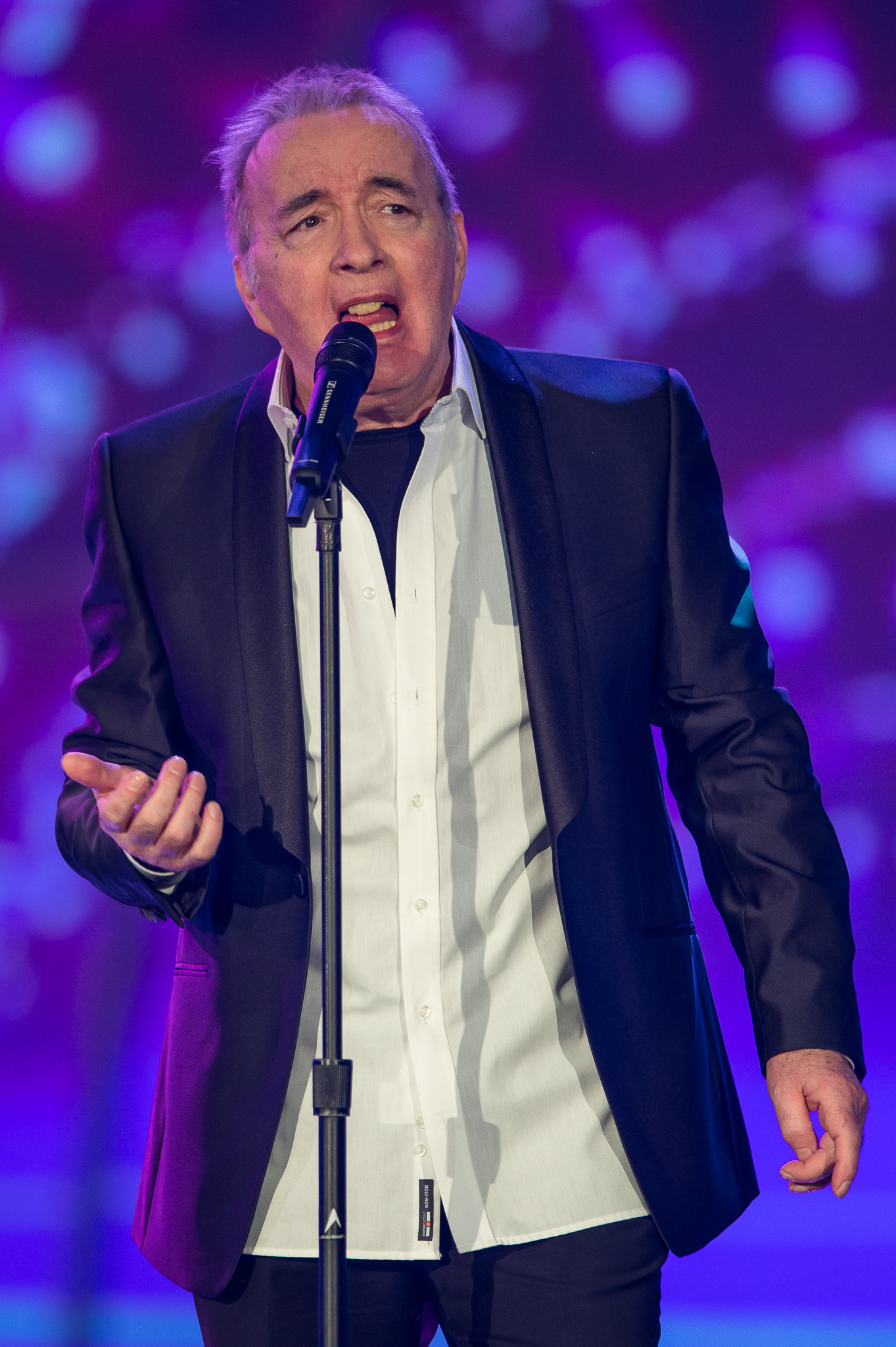
- Ryan performing in 2015

Background information
- Born: Barry Sapherson; 24 October 1948; Leeds, West Riding of Yorkshire, England
- Died: 28 September 2021 (aged 72)
- Genres: Rock; pop; baroque pop
- Occupations: Musician; photographer
- Instrument: Vocals
- Years active: 1964–2018
- Labels: MGM; Polydor

Barry Ryan (born Barry Sapherson; 24 October 1948 – 28 September 2021), also known as Barry Davison, was an English pop singer and photographer. He achieved his initial success in the mid 1960s in a duo with his twin brother Paul. After Paul ceased performing to concentrate solely on songwriting, Barry became a solo artist. With his brother and as a solo artist, he had over a dozen UK chart hits.

His most successful hit, "Eloise", reached number 2 on the UK Singles Chart in 1968 and became a number one hit in 17 other countries. In the mid-1970s, he began his 40-year career as a fashion and portrait photographer. He worked for magazines such as Italian Vogue and David Bailey’s Ritz; he sold six photographs to the National Portrait Gallery.

== Early life ==
Barry Ryan and his identical twin brother Paul were born in Leeds, West Riding of Yorkshire, England, to pop singer Marion Ryan and antiques dealer Fred Sapherson. Fred left when the twins were two and they were brought up until they were 11 by their grandmother. Both boys then boarded at Fulneck School in Pudsey, outside Leeds.

== Pop career ==
When the boys were 16, their family moved to London. Their mother suggested they try a career as singers. Her boyfriend, later husband, impresario Harold Davison, managed the brothers; Paul and Barry signed with Decca Records in 1965 under the name of Paul & Barry Ryan.

Within two years they had eight Top 50 singles in the UK. Their best sellers were "Don't Bring Me Your Heartaches", a number 13 hit in 1965, "I Love Her", a number 17 hit in 1966 and "Have Pity on the Boy", a number 18 hit the same year.

Paul Ryan opted out of the stress of show business, and Barry continued as a solo artist, enabling his brother to stay out of the limelight and concentrate on writing songs. Their greatest achievement as a composer-singer duo, then for MGM Records, was "Eloise", a number 2 hit in 1968. Melodramatic and heavily orchestrated, it sold over one million copies and was awarded a gold disc. "Love Is Love", their next chart entry, also became a million-seller.

Ryan was popular in Germany and France. The single "Red Man" reached number 2 in the French chart in 1971. Promoted by Bravo, the German youth magazine, he recorded a number of songs in German. "Die Zeit macht nur vor dem Teufel halt" ("Time Only Stops for the Devil"; English recording as "Today" released on the album Red Man in 1971) peaked at number 8.

Ryan stopped performing in the early 1970s. He made a comeback in the late 1990s when a two CD set with his and his brother's old songs was released. Ryan was also part of the "Solid Silver '60s Tour" of the United Kingdom in 2003, singing "Eloise" backed by the Dakotas. He made occasional appearances thereafter, for example 2018 on the German TV show Willkommen bei Carmen Nebel, singing "Eloise".

== Photography career ==
Ryan maintained a successful career as a fashion photographer, from the late 1970s, and his photographs appeared in such magazines as Ritz, Zoom, and the Italian Vogue. He made portraits of celebrities such as Ronald Reagan, Margaret Thatcher, Stephen Hawking, Sting, Paul McCartney, and Björk.

In the 1990s, he worked on a photographic project commemorating his brother Paul. Six of his photographic portraits were purchased by the National Portrait Gallery, London for its permanent collection in 1994.

== Personal life ==
Ryan was briefly married to Tunku (Princess) Miriam binti al-Marhum Sultan Sir Ibrahim (born 1950), the only child of Sultan Ibrahim of Johor and his sixth wife, Sultana Marcella (née Marcella Mendl). Married in 1976 and divorced in 1980, they had no children.

Ryan's mother married Harold Davison and, in 1984, he changed his name by deed poll to Barry Davison.

On November 29, 1992, his brother Paul died of lung cancer.

In 1995, Ryan married Christine Goodliff. They had a son and daughter. Jack Davison (18 April 1995) and Sophia Davison (4 September 1996).

Ryan died at the age of 72 on 28 September 2021, after complications from a lung disorder.
