= Lew Bedell =

American entertainer (1919–2000)

- Born: Lewis Joseph Bedinsky; March 21, 1919
- Died: July 6, 2000 (aged 81); Los Angeles, California, U.S.
- Other names: Lewis Bedell; Louis Bideu; Billy Joe Hunter
- Occupations: record label owner; comic entertainer
- Known for: Founder of Era Records and Doré Records

Lewis Joseph Bedell (March 21, 1919 – July 6, 2000) was an American music business executive and comic entertainer who founded Era Records and then Doré Records in Los Angeles in the 1950s. Originally named Lewis Joseph Bedinsky, he also used the pseudonyms Louis Bideu and Billy Joe Hunter, among others.

== Early life ==
Lewis Bedinsky was born in El Paso, Texas, the son of Joseph Bedinsky, a Jewish immigrant from Odesa, Ukraine, who owned a small garment factory in the town, and his wife Sara (née Newman) who had been born in New York City. His parents divorced when he was a child, and he moved with his mother and uncle, Max Newman, to Boyle Heights in Los Angeles. He attended Los Angeles City College and then Santa Barbara State College. In 1941, he and his mother changed their surname by decree to Bedell.

During World War II, Bedell worked in an aircraft factory. In 1946 he teamed up with college friend Doug Mattson to form a comedy duo. Bedell and Mattson appeared together in clubs in San Francisco, Las Vegas, Lake Tahoe, New York City and elsewhere, performing an act that involved them miming and clowning around on stage to current pop hits and comedy records such as those by Spike Jones. By the early 1950s, the pair had become resident comedians at Billy Gray's Band Box, a supper club on Fairfax Avenue in Los Angeles. The pair split up in 1953, and Bedell began working as a solo comedian on Los Angeles TV station KTLA, as well as continuing in clubs. He also had a short-lived TV show, The Lew Bedell Show, on WOR-TV in New York City in the early 1950s.

By 1955 Bedell had begun work for a music publisher, Meadowlark Music. That year he set up a new record label, Era, with his uncle Max Newman and cousin Herb Newman, and became its comptroller. The company appointed Buddy Bregman as musical director, and he in turn brought singer Gogi Grant to the label. Grant's successes with songs like "Suddenly There's a Valley" and "The Wayward Wind", co-written by Herb Newman, established the Era label. Later, the label won an action against Grant for breach of contract when she signed with RCA in 1957. Era signed several singers, such as Glen Glenn, in an attempt to break into the rock and roll market, but had little success. However, in 1958 the label had another major hit with "Chanson d'Amour", by Art and Dotty Todd.

Bedell married Dolores Ethel Mae "DeDe" Barrymore (born 1930) in 1956. She was the divorced daughter of actors John Barrymore and Dolores Costello. The couple had two children: a son, Doré Lewis Bedell (born 1957), who was named for Lew Bedell's grandmother Dora; and a daughter Stephanie Mae Bedell (born 1966). DeDe also had two children from her first marriage.

== Doré Records ==
Bedell was later described as "a garrulous man who masked a hardheaded business sense with endearing and sometimes annoying bluster." In June 1958, he and Herb Newman set up a new label with record distributor George Jay, for releasing new rock and roll material, and named it Doré after Bedell's young son. The label's first hit was "To Know Him Is To Love Him" by The Teddy Bears, written by and featuring the young Phil Spector. Bedell and Newman decided to end their partnership in 1959, with Newman retaining control of Era and Bedell running the Doré label.

The Doré label had several major pop and novelty hits over the next few years, including "Baby Talk" by Jan and Dean. In 1961, Bedell suggested to session leader Ernie Freeman that he and fellow musicians - including drummer Earl Palmer, guitarist René Hall, bassist Red Callender and marimba player Julius Wechter - record a version of a Maxwell House advertising jingle. The record, "Percolator (Twist)", was credited to Billy Joe & the Checkmates and rose to no.10 on the Billboard Hot 100 in early 1962. Bedell claimed a co-writing credit using the pseudonym "Louis Bideu", and, to help promote the record, used an old college photo of himself, as "Billy Joe Hunter". The label released a further 18 singles credited to Billy Joe & The Checkmates but recorded by studio musicians over the following years.

From the mid-1960s, the Doré label issued pop and R&B records. It also produced comedy albums, including Bedell's own 1967 album Oh Mighty Game of Golf!!; Bedell was an enthusiastic golfer. He continued to run Doré Records until shortly before his death. In later years Bedell released three additional comedy CDs under his own name: Mel's Hole (1997), Bad Bad Biker (1998), and Extra, Extra... Humor Discovered in the Bible (2000).

== Death ==
Bedell died of cancer in Los Angeles in 2000, at the age of 81.
