= Herb Newman =

American songwriter and record label founder

- Born: May 5, 1925; Los Angeles, California, U.S.
- Died: June 20, 1976 (aged 51); Los Angeles, California, U.S.
- Occupations: Songwriter, record label owner
- Known for: Founder of Era Records and Doré Records

Herb Newman was an American songwriter and record label owner. He founded Era Records in 1955.

== Early life ==
Newman was born in Los Angeles, California, on May 5, 1925. His father was Max Newman. He grew up with his cousin Lew Bedell, who later became his business partner.

== Career ==
Newman worked as a salesman for Mercury and Decca Records before starting his own label. In 1955, Newman and Bedell founded Era Records in Hollywood, California. The label focused on pop and rhythm and blues, later adding country and jazz.

Era Records had its first major hit in 1956 with "The Wayward Wind" by Gogi Grant, which Newman co-wrote.

In 1958, Newman and Bedell started a second label, Doré Records. They released "To Know Him Is to Love Him" by The Teddy Bears, written and produced by a young Phil Spector. In 1959, Bedell sold his share of Era Records to Newman.

Era Records signed artists such as Jewel Akens, Donnie Brooks, Ketty Lester, Larry Verne, and Art & Dotty Todd. Hits included "Love Letters," "Mr. Custer," "Mission Bell," and "Chanson D'Amour."

In early 1962, Newman agreed to distribute the third pressing of the Beach Boys' first single "Surfin'" for Candix Records. Era took over distribution of the single, but continued to distribute it under the Candix label. In the 1970s, Newman sold Era Records to K-tel.

== Songwriting ==
Newman wrote or co-wrote songs including:

- "The Wayward Wind" (with Stanley Lebowsky)
- "The Birds and the Bees"
- "And Her Name Is Scarlet
- "When the Tide is High"

== Death ==
Newman died in Los Angeles on June 20, 1976, at age 51.

== Influence ==
Meat Puppets shared a cover version of "The Wayward Wind#Notable cover versions," recorded live in Utrecht, Holland in 1994.
