= Don't You Worry My Little Pet =

Single by the Teddy Bears
- A-side: "To Know Him Is to Love Him"
- Released: September 1958
- Recorded: May 20, 1958
- Studio: Gold Star, Hollywood
- Genre: Rock and roll
- Length: 2:01
- Label: Doré
- Songwriter: Phil Spector

The Teddy Bears singles chronology
"To Know Him Is to Love Him" / "Don't You Worry My Little Pet" (1958)	"I Don't Need You Anymore" (1959)

"Don't You Worry My Little Pet" is a song by American pop quartet the Teddy Bears that was written by Phil Spector, their guitarist and producer. It was released in September 1958 as the B-side of the group's "To Know Him Is to Love Him", which topped the Billboard Hot 100.

== Background and composition ==
As a teenager, Spector had sought studio time at Gold Star and prepared material by rehearsing songs written in his bedroom with schoolmates Marshall Leib and Harvey Goldstein. He experimented with layering sounds by recording his and Leib’s voices on a portable tape recorder, then playing back the tapes to double-track their vocals.

An upbeat rock and roll song, he based "Don't You Worry My Little Pet" on his then-favorite performers, Buddy Holly and the Everly Brothers, particularly the latter's "Bye, Bye Love" (1957). Centered on a Chuck Berry–style guitar riff and "wah-do-wah" backing vocals, it featured a mostly harmonic vocal arrangement without a lead vocal.

== Recording ==
"Don't You Worry My Little Pet" was recorded on May 20, 1958 in a single a two-hour session at Gold Star, where he, Leib, Goldstein, and classmate Carol Connors (then Annette Kleinbard) recorded "Don't You Worry My Little Pet". With studio owner Stan Ross engineering, Spector directed the session and performed guitar, piano, and vocal parts while frequently moving between the studio floor and control booth to assess the playback.

The unprecedented recording approach, according to author David Howard, involved overdubbing by simultaneously capturing the initial recorded performance through studio speakers. Technical limitations complicated the process; the studio's equipment was incapable of synchronizing playback and live recording seamlessly, requiring the performers to monitor through headphones while cupping one ear to hear their own voices. The use of headphones for partial monitoring during overdubs later became widespread studio practice.

== Release ==
According to biographer Mick Brown: "Nobody apart from Spector was really convinced the song was any good. Stan Ross would later dismiss it as 'a piece of crap', and even Anette Kleinbart [sic] thought it was 'dreadful'." After signing with Era Records, a small independent label, the group adopted the name "the Teddy Bears" and selected another original composition by Spector, "To Know Him Is to Love Him", as the B-side for their first single. The song was subsequently promoted as the A-side and topped national charts in late 1958.

== Art and Dotty Todd version ==
On November 17, 1958, a version recorded by Art and Dotty Todd was given a four-star rating in Billboard, indicating "very strong sales potential". The publication referred to it a "swingy rocker ... Side moves, and it could get some action."
