= The Birds and the Bees (Jewel Akens song) =

1964 single by Jewel Akens

Single by Jewel Akens

from the album The Birds and the Bees
- B-side: "Tic Tac Toe"
- Released: December 1964
- Genre: Pop, easy listening
- Length: 2:08
- Label: Era
- Songwriters: Barry Stuart (pseudonym of Herb Newman)
- Producer: Barry Stuart

"The Birds and the Bees" was a 1964 single release by Jewel Akens that is said to have been written by the twelve-year-old son of Era Records owner Herb Newman; the songwriting credit on the Jewel Akens recording of "The Birds and the Bees" reads Barry Stuart, which is the song's standard songwriting credit.

== History ==
"The Birds and the Bees" was written with a lyric based on the "birds and the bees" idiom commonly referenced with regard to affording young people their introduction to sex education. An international hit in 1965, "The Birds and the Bees" was reminiscent of such 1950s' honky tonk-style hits as "Blueberry Hill" by Fats Domino and "Kansas City" by Wilbert Harrison. Some subsequent recordings (i.e. by artists other than Akens) identify the composer as Herb Newman (Newman had written "The Wayward Wind" a 1956 No. 1 hit for Gogi Grant). Jewel Akens had recorded one single for Era as frontman for the doo-wop group the Turn-Arounds in 1964 when Newman pitched "The Birds and the Bees" as the group's next recording; as Akens was the only group member to favor the song he recorded it solo, working through four or five different arrangements and thus considerably honing the song's original format. Musicians on the recording included Tommy Turner on background vocals, Billy Strange and Ervan Coleman on guitar, Bob West and Arthur Wright on bass, Hal Blaine on drums and Leon Russell on piano.

== Chart performance ==
Recorded at Gold Star Studios - with sound engineer Stan Ross employing the innovative technique of "chorusing" by patching the session guitarist into an organ speaker - "The Birds and the Bees" afforded Akens a Top Ten hit in the first quarter of 1965 reaching No. 2 on the US Cash Box singles chart and No. 3 on the US Billboard Hot 100 chart: the single also reached No. 21 on the US Billboard Hot Rhythm & Blues Singles chart. It was No. 2 for 4 weeks on Canada's CHUM Chart, kept out of Number 1 by The Beatles and Herman's Hermits. The disc also had strong chart impact internationally reaching No. 3 in Australia, No. 6 in Belgium (Flemish Region), No. 3 in the Netherlands and No. 4 in Norway. In the UK "The Birds and the Bees" afforded Akens a more moderate hit, reaching No. 29, with Akens besting a cover version by Johnny Kidd & the Pirates that failed to chart.

== Other recordings ==
- Alma Cogan covered Akens's hit for release in Scandinavia and was afforded a No.1 hit in Sweden for three weeks in the summer of 1965, and also a Top Ten hit in both Denmark and Norway, with respective peaks of No.8 and No.4 (Cogan's version of "The Birds and the Bees" matching the Norwegian chart peak of Akens' original). Alma Cogan is often credited with a UK cover of "The Birds and the Bees"; in fact her UK single of that name - No.25 in 1956 - was a recording of "(The Same Thing Happens with) The Birds and the Bees".
- Later in 1965, Dean Martin included his version on (Remember Me) I'm the One Who Loves You.
- A 1966 single release by Rufus and Carla Thomas was more simply titled "Birds and Bees".
- Bobby G. Rice recorded "The Birds and the Bees" in 1971 to serve as B-side for his No.33 C&W chart hit "Suspicion", with "The Birds and The Bees" being featured on Rice's 1972 debut album Hit After Hit.
- An Italian-language rendering of "The Birds and the Bees", "Sulla sabbia c’era lei", was recorded by Sonia e le Sorelle (it), and was an entrant in the 1965 Cantagiro festival; Nicola Salerno wrote the lyrics which typically of the song's non-English renderings are independent of the English original, the title translating as "On the sand there was you".
- Also in 1965, Drafi Deutscher (de) & His Magics recorded a German rendering of "The Birds and the Bees" entitled "Heute male ich dein Bild" (Today I paint your image).
- Cindy Lou" which reached No.3 in Germany and No.5 in Austria while the French rendering "Bientôt les vacances" (Soon the holidays) by Monty (fr) reached No.11 in France; Québécois artist Donald Lautrec also recorded a French take of "The Birds and the Bees" in 1965, that being "Tu Dis Des Bêtises" (You say the nonsense).
- The Cindy Lou spawned a parody recording by Jacques Desrosiers entitled "Il Y'a Des Bibites" (There are some bugs).
- Ambrus Kyri (hu) recorded a Hungarian rendering of "The Birds and the Bees" entitled "Madarak és Méhek" (Birds and bees) in 1967.
- A recording was made in Danish as "Blomster og bier" (flowers and bees) by Birthe Kjær in 1974.
- "The Birds and the Bees" was done in Swedish as "Blommor och bin" (Flowers and bees) by lyricist Keith Almgren and recorded by Little Gerhard 1965 (SweDisc SWDS 1093) and Sten & Stanley (sv) on their album Musik, dans & party 8 (1993).
- It was also performed in Finnish by Laila Kinnunen as "Kuinka kuu katoaa".
- the Chicks.
- the Defenders (da).
- Jan Keizer, Brenda Lee.
- Gary Lewis & the Playboys.
- Billy Preston.
- Sha Na Na.
- Spooky and Sue (nl).
- Vilma Santos in 1971 under Willear's Records.
