= Trance (soundtrack) =

Trance (Original Soundtrack)

Soundtrack album by Rick Smith
- Released: 25 March 2013 (UK); 2 April 2013 (US)
- Genre: Electronic; jazz; pop; rock
- Length: 73:01
- Label: Republic
- Producer: Rick Smith; Danny Boyle

Trance (Original Soundtrack) is the soundtrack to the 2013 film Trance directed by Danny Boyle. Featuring music composed by British electronic music duo Underworld frontman Rick Smith, the soundtrack consisted of electronic, jazz, pop and rock music from Smith, along with contributions from Art and Dotty Todd, Emeli Sandé, Kirsty McGee, Moby, M People and Rosario Dawson, one of the film's lead actors. The soundtrack was released first in the United Kingdom on 25 March 2013, and in the United States on 2 April. Republic Records distributed the album.

== Development ==
Smith previously contributed music for Boyle's previous ventures including Trainspotting (1996), A Life Less Ordinary (1997), The Beach (2000), and Sunshine (2007). When Boyle halted the post-production as he wanted to work on the opening ceremony of 2012 Summer Olympics, where Smith also contributed, he took a break on music composition until the conclusion of sports event. After a month, he received a text from Boyle asking him to work for the film, which he immediately agreed. Boyle claimed that Smith's music drives the interior landscape of the characters as they try to solve it.

Smith written eleven tracks specifically for the film, along with selections from Boyle and Smith used in key sequences of the film, including music from Moby, Unkle and M People. He felt that working with Boyle was "joyful", as he was "a great collaborator and a giver of artistic freedom, he loves to be surprised, and also wants his film music loud and with presence, almost like another character — for me this is creatively exciting and inspiring." Emeli Sandé collaborated with Smith again after providing vocals for the Olympics' opening ceremony, who co-wrote the song "Here It Comes" as one of the "special" tracks from the film. Smith claimed that her vocals and lyrics "are a perfect ingredient of the score". Each tracks have been reworked and developed specifically for the album release to give an "immersive listening experience" instead of series of short cues, to provide a "hypnotic, disoreinted and mesmerizing" score.

== Track listing ==
No.	Title	Artist(s)	Length
1.	"Chanson D'Amour"	Art and Dotty Todd	2:53
2.	"Bullet Cut"	Rick Smith	4:39
3.	"Solomon"	Rick Smith	7:08
4.	"Here It Comes"	Emeli Sandé; Rick Smith	7:38
5.	"Cannon Fall"	Rick Smith	7:42
6.	"Sandman"	Kirsty McGee	3:32
7.	"Raw Umber"	Rick Smith	4:08
8.	"The Day"	Moby	4:31
9.	"Santiago (101 Greatest Goals)"	Rick Smith	6:39
10.	"Hold My Hand"	Rick Smith	4:59
11.	"Bring It To Me"	Rick Smith	5:03
12.	"Movin' On Up"	M People	3:34
13.	"Soho Dim Sum"	Rick Smith	2:22
14.	"You Knew"	Rick Smith	3:09
15.	"The Heist"	Rick Smith	3:46
16.	"Sandman (I'll be There)"	Rosario Dawson; Rick Smith	1:18
Total length:			73:01

== Reception ==
Mayer Nissim of Digital Spy wrote "from a small clutch of carefully-selected songs, Smith has composed a restrained-but-powerful, twisting and turning keyboard-heavy soundtrack". George Bass of Drowned in Sound rated 8 out of 10 to the soundtrack, saying "The album might have been sharper if it had been solely his work [...] but the guest tracks here show off Danny Boyle’s eclectic vision, and as usual, Smith answers it in style."

Laurence Phelan of The Independent and Christopher Orr of The Atlantic called the score as "pulse-quickening techno" that "throbs appropriately". Oliver Lyletton of IndieWire complimented it as "tremendous" and sometimes "ear-splitting". R. Kurt Oselund of Slant Magazine acknowledged as the title suggests, the film is "musically driven, laced with a booming electronica score by Underworld’s Rick Smith." Calling it as one of the best soundtracks of 2013, Ryan Leas of Stereogum wrote "Smith’s score melds house and orchestral music in a way that helps create the sort of alternate reality necessary for the genre mash-up."

== Chart performance ==
Chart (2013)	Peak position
UK Compilation Albums (OCC)	73
UK Soundtrack Albums (OCC)	35
