= Carol Connors (singer) =

American singer-songwriter (born 1941)

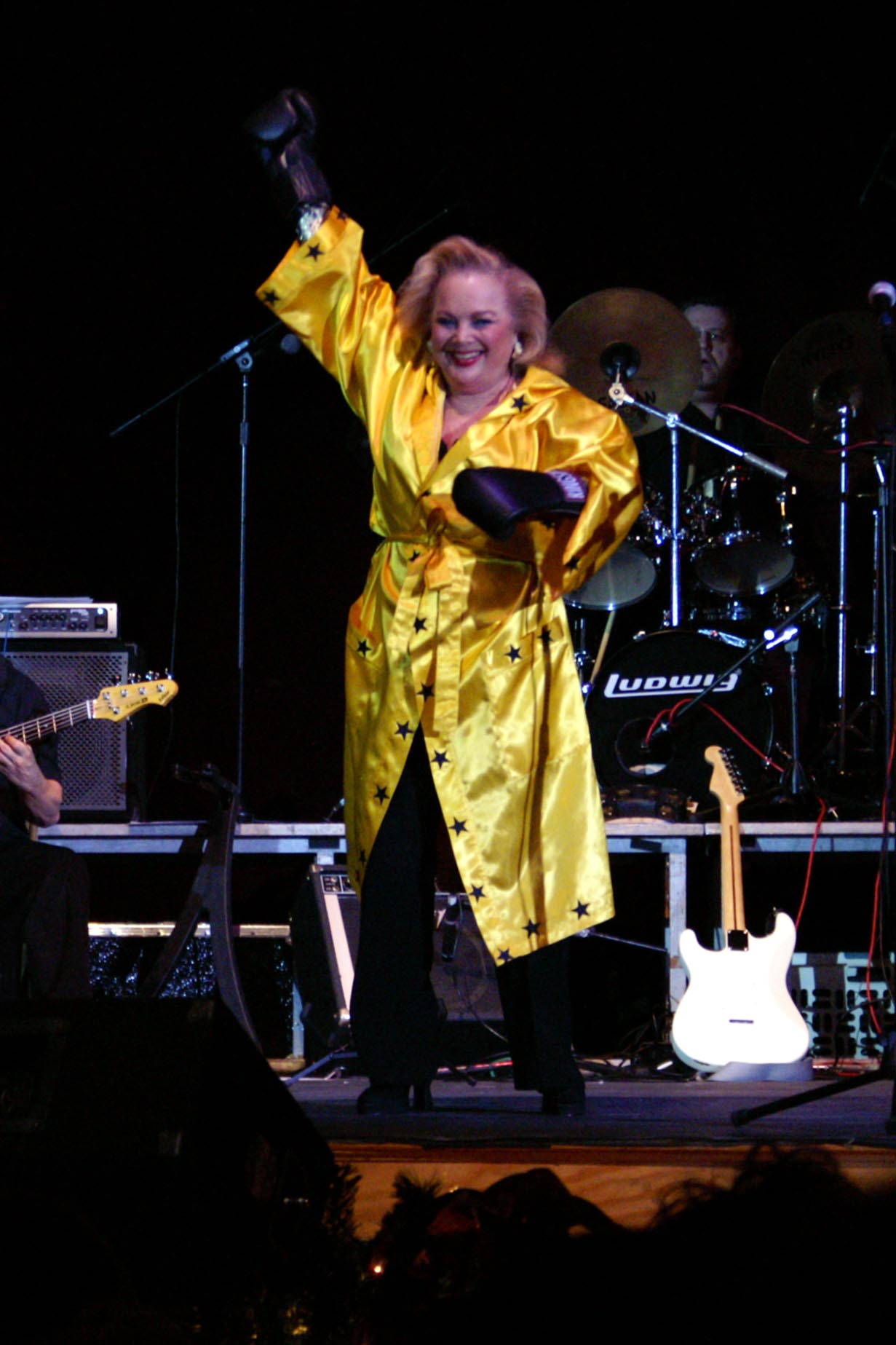
- Connors performing in 2007

Background information
- Born: Annette Kleinbard; November 13, 1941 (age 84); New Brunswick, New Jersey, U.S.
- Genres: Rock and roll, pop
- Occupation: Singer-songwriter
- Instrument: Vocals
- Years active: 1956–present
- Label: Doré
- Website: www.carolconnors.com

Carol Connors (born Annette Kleinbard; November 13, 1941) is an American singer-songwriter. She is perhaps best known as the lead vocalist on the Teddy Bears' single, "To Know Him Is To Love Him", which was written by her bandmate Phil Spector. Her best known contribution as songwriter is co-writing the song "Gonna Fly Now" for the 1976 movie Rocky, for which she shared an Academy Award nomination for Best Original Song with lyricist Ayn Robbins and composer Bill Conti. The audiobook version of her auto-biography, co-written with Steve Bergsman, Elvis, Rocky and Me: The Carol Connors Story narrated by Kathy Garver received a Grammy nomination for the 68th Grammy Awards in the Best Audiobook Category. Connors produced the audiobook version with David Longoria.

== Early life ==
Connors was born Annette Kleinbard in New Brunswick, New Jersey. Her parents were Polish Jews. She lost many relatives in the Holocaust. She attended Fairfax High School in Los Angeles, California.

== Career ==
She was the lead singer of the pop vocal trio known as the Teddy Bears, which also included Phil Spector. The Teddy Bears' only major hit, "To Know Him Is To Love Him", which Spector wrote specifically to showcase Connors' singing voice, reached No. 1 on the Billboard Hot 100 in late 1958, also becoming the first woman to chart. After their initial hit, the trio disbanded because of the failure of their follow-up singles, a car accident that injured Annette, and the fact that Spector preferred working behind the scenes to performing.

Some years later she legally changed her name to Carol Connors, because she did not want her first name to be associated with Mouseketeer Annette Funicello. She co-wrote (with Ayn Robbins and Bill Conti) "Gonna Fly Now", the theme song from the film Rocky, which earned her an Academy Award nomination. Carol Connors sang the theme to the film Orca, titled "My Love, We Are One” heard in the film’s final credits.

Other songwriting credits include the Rip Chords' 1964 hit "Hey Little Cobra", plus the 1980 Billy Preston/Syreeta Wright duet "With You I'm Born Again"; the 1994 title track "For All Mankind" on the debut album of Italian singer Guendalina Cariaggi, which was used as the theme song for a documentary produced by Pier Quinto and Lara Cariaggi, on the legends of soccer and the FIFA World Cup; for "Madonna in the Mirror", the finale song on A&E's 15 Films About Madonna; and three songs – "Condi, Condi", "I Think of You so Fondly", and "Chill, Condi, Chill" – for Courting Condi (2008).

Connors also wrote and performed songs for several films. The 1965 beach-party film A Swingin' Summer features her title song, co-written with Buzz Cason (credited as James Cason) and Roger Christian; the song was performed in the film by Jody Miller, and by Connors on the soundtrack album. The 1967 film Catalina Caper features her song "Book of Love" (not to be confused with the Monotones' song), also co-written with Roger Christian, which she performed backed by the Cascades. She co-composed (with Ayn Robbins) three songs for the soundtrack of the 1977 Disney film, The Rescuers: "Tomorrow Is Another Day", "The Journey" and "Someone's Waiting for You". In 1983 Connors was nominated for a Golden Raspberry Award, for the 'Worst Original Song' for "It's Wrong for Me to Love You", from Butterfly, which she co-composed with Ennio Morricone.

In 2011, she scuba-dived and performed a concert to raise awareness for the Wounded Warrior Project.

A Golden Palm Star on the Palm Springs Walk of Stars was dedicated to her in 1999.

== Personal life ==
Connors lives in Beverly Hills, California.

She testified at the O. J. Simpson trial in 1995. She had seen Simpson at a charity event the night before his ex-wife's murder.

== Discography ==
- "My Diary" (1961)
