= Candix Records =

Candix Enterprises
- Founded: August 26, 1960
- Founder: Robert Dix; Richard Dix; William Silva
- Defunct: 1962
- Country of origin: U.S.
- Location: 6425 Hollywood Boulevard, Los Angeles, California

Candix Enterprises (stylized as CANDIX Enterprises) was an independent American record label known primarily for releasing the Beach Boys' first single, "Surfin'".

== History ==
The label was established on August 26, 1960 by brothers Richard and Bob Dix. Candix was named for the label's president Bob Silva, whose stepfather's name was Canaday, and the Dix brothers. Joe Saraceno was the label's A&R director. Notable artists included Lou Rawls and the Frogmen, whose 1961 single "Underwater" reached number 44 on the Billboard Hot 100.

Prior to releasing their first single "Surfin'" on the label, the Beach Boys were briefly known as the Surfers, which was the name included on the acetate that found its way to Candix. Record promoter Russ Regan, whose employer handled distribution of the single, has been credited as giving the Beach Boys their name. "Surfin'" became a local hit, but Bob Dix was unable to pay the original pressing plant and established X Records, a subsidiary of Candix, in December 1961 as a way to get more copies of the record pressed. In January 1962, Saraceno, then no longer employed with the label, contacted Herb Newman of Era Records, who distributed the third pressing of the single under the Candix name. "Surfin'" reached number 75 on the Billboard Hot 100 in March 1962. The Beach Boys only received $990 in royalties from the single.

The Candix record label was frequently plagued with financial issues. Silva was accused of stealing thousands of dollars from the company, and was dismissed as president in July 1961. Richard and Bob's brother Sherman failed to put his real estate profits back into the company and "spent the money on a lavish personal lifestyle". The record label closed around August–September 1962, just a few months after The Beach Boys signed with Capitol Records.

== Discography ==
No.	Artist	Titles	Rel.
301	Ethan Du Veaux	Undertow/Magnifique	9/60
302	Johnny MacRae	Betcha Johnny Knows/The Lonely Years	9/60
303	Russ Regan and The Rowdies	The Waterboy/Night Search	10/60
304	Lanny Duncan	Romeo's Teacher/Why Did We Say Goodbye	10/60
305	Lou Rawls	In My Little Black Book/Just Thought You'd Like To Know	?/60
306	The Sensationals	Once In A While/Snow White Winter	11/60
307	The Hi-Tones	I've Never Seen A Straight Banana/The Special Day	?/60
308	Solid Jackson	East LA/Speedy Gonzalez	?/60
309	Don and Marty	Mandolin Rock/Fidel And Raul	?/60
310	Faye Reis	Don'tcha Break My Heart/How Much Longer	12/60
311	Theola Kilgore	The Sound Of My Man/Later I'll Cry	12/60
312	Lou Rawls	80 Ways/When We Get Old	1/61
313	Sue Black	It Doesn't Matter Anymore/Take Me	1/61
314	The Frogmen	Underwater/The Mad Rush [#44]	3/61
315	Eddy Drake	Passing Time Between Heartaches/Learning To Live Alone	?/61
316	Lanny Duncan	Tummy Tickles/Hold Me, Thrill Me, Kiss Me	?/61
316	Lanny Duncan	Tummy Tickles/Why Did We Say Goodbye	?/61
317	Faye Reis	My Lover Boy/Your Fool	6/61
318	Eddie Lemaire	You And I Against The World/I Want You	?/61
319	The Sensationals	The City Sleeps/It Wouldn't Be The Same (Without You)	?/61
320	Cole Younger	School Of Love/Broken Hearted Song	?/61
321	Ralph	I've Got It/Rugged Ralph The Rapid Rabbit	?/61
322	Marc Cavell	Hide And Seek/That's All I Want	?/61
323	Bobby Williams	Wonder If My Baby's Coming Home/Can't Let You See Me	?/61
324	Jim Mitchum	Lonely Birthday/Oh, What A Wonderful Feeling	?/61
325	The Kelly Four	Annie Had A Party/Sweet Angelina	?/61
325	Big Daddy Deerfield and The Kelly Four	Annie Had A Party/Sweet Angelina	?/61
326	The Frogmen	Beware Below/Tioga	?/61
327	Sonny Wilson	I Ain't Givin' Up Nothin'/Troubled Time	?/61
328	Lanny Duncan	Don't Be Afraid To Cry/Thank You For Your Love	?/61
329	Marc Cavell and The Classmates	I Didn't Lie/I See It	?/61
330	Bill Lyons	That's All Right/Little Fool	?/61
331	The Beach Boys	Surfin'/Luau* [#75]	11/61
332	Faye Reis	Red Haired Sally/Perfect Love	1/62
333	Gene Anderson	You Got Something/Old Folks Party	?/62
334	Bobby Lloyd	Left All Alone/Our Love	?/62
335	The Moongooners	Moon Goon Stomp/The Long Trip	5/62
336	Skip Sodor Band	Begin The Beguine/Work Out	5/62
337	(not allocated)		?/62
338	Andy Belvin	Walking The Blues/Prettiest Girl	?/62
339	David Box	If You Can't Say Something Nice/I've Had My Moments	8/62
340	Curtis Byrd	Pretty Woman/Turn Some More Lights On	?/62
341	Dean Beard	The Day That I Lost You/Villa Acuna	?/62
*		"Surfin'" was also released in December 1962 as X Records single 301 and in January 1962 as Candix single 301.	
