= Doré Records =

Defunct American record label

- Parent company: Era Records
- Founded: June 1958
- Founder: Lew Bedell; Herb Newman
- Distributor: Ace
- Genre: Pop, rock and roll, novelty, comedy
- Country of origin: United States
- Location: Los Angeles, California

Doré Records (pronounced "dorrie") was a record label founded in Los Angeles, California, in 1958 by Lew (or Lou) Bedell and his cousin Herb Newman.

== History ==
In 1955 Bedell and Newman had set up Era Records, which had several hits with such artists as Gogi Grant ("The Wayward Wind") and Art and Dotty Todd ("Chanson d'Amour"). However, Era had failed to break into the rock and roll market, which Bedell was anxious to do.

Bedell and Newman set up Doré Records in June 1958, with the support of record distributor George Jay. The label was named after Bedell's young son Doré, who himself had been named for Bedell's grandmother Dora Newman. The label's first big hit was "To Know Him Is to Love Him" by the Teddy Bears, written by Phil Spector, who was a member of the group. Bedell insisted on releasing the record as it had been recorded, although Newman wanted to overdub strings. This disagreement contributed to Bedell and Newman deciding to end their partnership in 1959, with Newman retaining control of Era and Bedell running the Doré label.

Among the early staff at Doré were Herb Alpert and Lou Adler. The Doré label had several major pop and novelty hits over the next few years, including "Baby Talk" by Jan and Dean, and "Percolator (Twist)", credited to Billy Joe & the Checkmates but actually recorded by session musicians directed by Ernie Freeman. The label also released singles by John and Judy (John was John Maus, later of the Walker Brothers), Little Ray, Ronnie Cook ("Goo Goo Muck", later covered by the Cramps), and many others.

In the mid-1960s, the Doré label issued pop and R&B records, including releases by the Whispers, Richard "Dimples" Fields, and Toussaint McCall. Doré also issued comedy albums, and its most successful act was the comedy duo of Hudson & Landry.

Bedell continued to run Doré Records until shortly before his death in 2001. The catalogue is now owned by Ace Records of the UK.
