= Glen Glenn (singer) =

American singer-songwriter (1934–2022)

- Also known as: Glen Trout
- Born: Orin Glenn Troutman; October 24, 1934; Joplin, Missouri, U.S.
- Died: March 18, 2022 (aged 87)
- Genres: Rockabilly
- Occupations: Singer-songwriter, musician
- Instruments: Vocals, guitar

Orin Glenn Troutman (October 24, 1934 – March 18, 2022), known professionally as Glen Glenn, was an American rockabilly singer, whose career began in the early 1950s and continued for several decades.

== Life and career ==
He was born in Joplin, Missouri, and relocated with his parents to San Dimas, California, in 1948. In the early 1950s, he formed a duo with guitarist Gary Lambert, called the Missouri Mountain Boys, and began playing country music in bars in Los Angeles. They soon began performing on local television shows, and met singer and guitarist Eddie Cochran, who became a formative influence. Troutman began using the stage name Glen Trout, and began touring and recording demo records, often without Lambert. In late 1957, he signed with Era Records in Los Angeles, adopted the name Glen Glenn, and in January 1958 his first single was released, "Everybody's Movin'" backed with "I'm Glad My Baby's Gone".

He was soon drafted, and, while Era continued to release his records, was unable to promote them. After leaving the Army in 1960, he transferred to the Dore label and made some more pop-oriented recordings, which were unsuccessful. He continued to perform occasionally with Lambert, while also working outside the music industry. In 1977, Ace Records in Britain released a compilation of his rockabilly recordings, and his career was reinvigorated. He recorded a new album with Lambert in 1984, and continued to perform in clubs in California as well as making occasional tours in Britain and Europe.

He died on March 18, 2022, at the age of 87.

== Discography ==
=== Studio albums ===
- Everybody's Movin' Again (1984, Ace)

=== Compilation albums ===
- The Glen Glenn Story (1982, Ace)
- Rockabilly Legend (1987, Sunjay)
- Missouri Rockabilly 1954-1959 (1999, Stomper Time)
- Glen Rocks (2003, Bear Family)
- Dim Lights, Thick Smoke And Loud Loud Music (2004, Bear Family)
- Pick 'Em Up And Lay 'Em Down! (2018, Bear Family)

=== Live albums ===
- Rose Maddox & Glen Glenn – Rockabilly Reunion - Live In London (1988, Magnum Force)
