= Warm (The Lettermen album) =

Studio album by The Lettermen
- Released: 1967
- Genre: Vocal pop
- Label: Capitol
- Producer: Steve Douglas

The Lettermen chronology
For Christmas This Year (1966)	Warm (1967)	Spring! (1967)

Singles from Warm
- 1. ""Chanson d'Amour""; 2. ""Our Winter Love""

Warm is a 1967 album by The Lettermen. The album cover featured the original line up of first tenor Jim Pike, second tenor Tony Butala, baritone Bob Engemann. Following this album Engemann left the group and was replaced by Gary Pike, Jim's brother. "Chanson d'Amour" was the first single, followed by "Our Winter Love" as the second single - in a new vocal version of the instrumental with lyrics written by Bob Tubert. The album title track "Warm" was the B-side.

== Track list ==
1. "Our Winter Love", Johnny Cowell, lyrics added by Bob Tubert
2. "Symphony for Susan", Bill Stegmeyer
3. "Don't Blame It on Me", Dick Addrisi / Don Addrisi
4. "Warm", written by Sid Jacobson, Jimmy Krondes (also David Buskin)
5. "Sleep Walk", vocal version
6. "She Don't Want Me Now" Dick Addrisi-Bodie Chandler
7. "For No One", John Lennon / Paul McCartney
8. "Smoke Gets in Your Eyes", Otto Harbach / Jerome Kern
9. "Here, There and Everywhere", John Lennon / Paul McCartney
10. "A Place for the Winter"
11. "Chanson d'Amour", Wayne Shanklin
