= Russ Regan =

US music industry executive

- Born: Albert Harold Rustigian; October 15, 1928; Sanger, California, U.S.
- Died: May 27, 2018 (aged 89) Palm Springs, California, U.S.
- Occupation: Record executive
- Labels: UNI, 20th Century, Motown

Russ Regan (born Albert Harold Rustigian; October 15, 1928 in Sanger, California – May 27, 2018 in Palm Springs, California) was an American record executive who was President of both UNI Records and 20th Century Records and was vice-president of A&R at Motown. Regan is the rare executive to have seen No. 1 hits in four successive decades.

== Career ==
Regan started his career in the 1950s as a composer and record producer. His first notable hit was a 1959 Christmas novelty song, inspired by "The Chipmunk Song", titled "The Happy Reindeer" credited to Dancer, Prancer and Nervous issued by Capitol Records. The song reached number 34 on the Billboard Hot 100. He also recorded "Calling All Cars" under the name Davy Summers for Warner Brothers with producer Sonny Bono. In 1961, Regan was hired by Buckeye Record Distributors as a record promoter. The company handled distribution for Tamla, Disneyland, Dot, and other labels. Regan has often been attributed as the person who renamed the Pendletones to the Beach Boys when the group's first record "Surfin'" was set to be released on Candix.

He would go on to promote songs by The Supremes, Smokey Robinson & The Miracles, Stevie Wonder, The Temptations, and Marvin Gaye. In the mid-1960s, he was drafted in to help form a musical direction for Warner Brothers' fledgling pop/soul music subsidiary, Loma Records. He also helped Frank Sinatra record his No. 4 hit, "That's Life" in 1966. He struck a deal with Jimmy Miller Productions when Miller left The Rolling Stones, which resulted in albums from B.B. King, Henry Gross, Bobby Whitlock, and others. Regan also signed Barry White, Patti Dahlstrom (whom he brought with him from Uni Records), Ambrosia and Harriet Schock to 20th Century Records.

Russ Regan played a major role in the careers of a number of recording artists, as he headed up labels such as Uni, 20th Century and Phonogram Records. Dozens of recording artists, including Elton John, Neil Diamond, Barry White, Patti Dahlstrom, Olivia Newton-John and The Beach Boys had Regan to thank for opening the doors for their success. One of his most surprising successes while at UNI was South African trumpeter Hugh Masakela's "Grazing In The Grass" in 1968, which sold over a million and reached the top spot in the Billboard pop chart.

While President of 20th Century Records, Regan was inspired from a dream to create the movie All This and World War II, which saw Fox News footage from WWII backed with various artists singing Beatles songs. The movie was never released on video, and it remains in the vaults of 20th Century Fox. Regan also supervised the soundtracks for the movies Endless Love, Breakin', The Karate Kid, All The Right Moves, Love At First Bite, This Is Spinal Tap, and A Chorus Line. Regan was also the Music Supervisor for four Academy Award-winning songs from the films The Poseidon Adventure, The Towering Inferno, Flashdance, and Chariots of Fire.
