= Colleen Lovett =

American singer, composer, and arranger (born 1936)

Colleen Lovett (born November 3, 1946, in Texas) is an American singer, composer, and arranger who, since the age of six, has flourished as a recording artist and performer in North America, Asia Pacific, and Europe in nightclubs, musical theater, and television. Before marrying bandleader Teddy Phillips, she was known as one of the Lovett Sisters, a singing duo with her sister, Charlotte Lovett, who had been married to bandleader Ray Herrera.

== Formal education ==
Entering as a freshman in the fall of 1963, Lovett earned a Bachelor of Arts degree from the University of North Texas and studied at the Berklee School of Music. She also studied at Pierce College in Woodland Hills, California, California State University in Northridge, and UCLA in Los Angeles.

She studied film scoring with composer Earle Hagen. She also studied film scoring and twelve-tone orchestration for several years with George Tremblay, who was well known for creating the definitive cycle, a serial technique of composition.

== Selected compositions ==
- "Until I Love You"
- "Freckle-Face Soldier"
- "Asleep in His Arms"
- "To Tommy With Love"
- "Wait for Me Sue"
- "Love's Melody"
- "Birds With Broken Wings"
- "Come and Taste My Kisses" ( a 12 tone composition )
- "Roadside Motel"
- "Getting Over you"
- "Hold On To Me"
- "Summer's Gone"
- "Roadside Motel"
- "Woman's Liberation Blues"
- "Monday Morning"
- "Hold On To Me"
- "Love Man"
- "Go-Go Girl"
- "Malibu and You"
- "City of the Angeles"
- "Wheels of Time"
- "When Are You Coming Home"

== Selected discography ==

"Colleen Lovett" Lovett Sisters

- Imperial 8233

"Until I Lost You"
"I Don't Want to Set the World on Fire"

- Imperial 8262 (195?) OCLC 406751844

IF-581 (matrix): "Sometime, Somewhere"
IF-584 (matrix): "Behind My Back"

- Imperial 8272 (stamped October 8, 1954)

"Little Dirty Face"
"Bacon and Eggs"

With Teddy Phillips

- Music You Want to Hear, Teddy Phillips and his Orchestra; featuring Colleen Lovett, Chicago: Drum Boy Records DBLM 1002(M) (1965) OCLC 29471593
- Five Men + Girl, Teddy Phillips Quintet, featuring Colleen Lovett, Carlton Records STLP 12-131 (1961) OCLC 35054661
- Tijuana Sounds, Teddy Phillips, Colleen Lovett, and their Mexican Brass P&L 10357 (1968)

Solo

- Brunswick 55127 (1959)

"Goodnight Sweetheart"
"I've Baked a Cake"

- Stepheny Records 1836 (1959)

"Wishin'"
"Cla-Wence" ("Don't Tweat Me So Wuff")

- Birds With Broken Wings, Colleen Lovett, Era Records E-605 (1974) OCLC 36009607

Recorded at Gold Star Studios, Hollywood

== Videography ==
- Teddy Phillips & Colleen Lovett

12-piece band including Dick Saunders (tenor sax, bass clarinet), Breesy Thomas (trombone), Ethmer Roten (flute), Ed Stanley (lead trumpet), Earl Morris (alto sax)
Taped with live audience, Golden West Ballroom, Norwalk, California, KCOP-TV, taped the week between August 7 and 13, 1965
