= Lee Lawrence =

British singer (1920–1961)

- Born: Julius Sirota; 1 September 1920; Chorlton, Lancashire, England
- Died: 25 February 1961 (aged 40) Aruba, Netherlands Antilles
- Genre: Traditional pop
- Instrument: Vocals
- Years active: 1940s–1961
- Labels: Decca, Columbia

Lee Lawrence (born Julius Leon Sirota; 1 September 1920 – 25 February 1961) was a British singer who was popular in the 1950s.

He was born in Chorlton, Lancashire. Both his parents sang with the Carl Rosa Opera Company, and at the age of 16 he went to Italy to study opera for three years. After returning to England, he enlisted in the Royal Tank Regiment and sang with the Entertainments National Service Association (ENSA), where he was noticed after the end of the war by BBC radio producer Roy Spear. Lawrence sang on Spear's programme Beginners Please, and made many appearances with other bands, including those of Stanley Black, Sydney Lipton, and Cyril Stapleton.

Lawrence made his first recordings for Decca Records in the late 1940s. His songs included "How Can You Buy Killarney", "Song of Capri", "So Ends My Search For My Dream", all in 1949; "The World is Mine Tonight" (his theme song) in 1950; "With These Hands", "A Beggar in Love", and "Vanity" in 1951; "At Last, At Last" and "The Man in the Black Sombrero" in 1952; "Crying in the Chapel" in 1953; and "Suddenly There's a Valley" in 1955. By late 1951, he was being promoted as "Britain's outstanding singing star", and topped the bill at the Shepherd's Bush Empire above radio comedian Peter Sellers and (at the foot of the bill) Morecambe and Wise. In the official UK Singles Chart, which started in 1952, his only chart hits were "Crying in the Chapel" (No. 7 in 1953) and "Suddenly There's a Valley" (No. 14 in 1955).

He was a popular attraction on the British variety circuit in the early and mid 1950s, and had his own series on Radio Luxembourg in 1955. After losing popularity to rock and roll performers in Britain, and failing to have a hit with the song "Rock 'n' Roll Opera", which parodied such singers as Elvis Presley, Gene Vincent and Tommy Steele, he moved in 1957 to the US, where he performed cabaret shows in the Catskills "Borscht Belt". He died in February 1961 of a heart attack at the age of 40, while touring in the West Indies.
