= The Teddy Bears =

American pop music group (1957–1960)

- The Teddy Bears, c. 1958; Clockwise from top: Carol Connors, Marshall Leib and Phil Spector

Background information
- Origin: Los Angeles, California, United States
- Genre: Pop
- Years active: 1957–1960
- Labels: Doré, Imperial
- Past members: Phil Spector; Marshall Leib; Carol Connors; Sandy Nelson; Harvey Goldstein

The Teddy Bears were an American pop music group. They were record producer Phil Spector's first vocal group.

== History ==
Following graduation from Fairfax High School in Los Angeles, California, Phil Spector became obsessed with "To Know Him Is to Love Him", a song he had written for his group, the Teddy Bears. After a hasty audition at Era Records, which offered to finance a studio session, the Teddy Bears – Phil Spector, Marshall Leib, Harvey Goldstein (who left the group early on), lead singer Annette Kleinbard, and last-minute recruit, drummer Sandy Nelson – recorded the song at Gold Star Studios at a cost of $75. Released on Era's Doré label in August 1958, it took two months before "To Know Him Is to Love Him" began to get airplay. The title was inscribed on Spector's father's tombstone, as "To Know Him Was To Love Him".

It went on to become a global hit. The record stayed in the Billboard Hot 100 for 23 weeks, in the Top Ten for 11 of those weeks, and commanded the number 1 chart position for three weeks. It also reached number 2 in the UK Singles Chart. It sold over two and a half million copies, and was awarded a gold disc by the RIAA. At 19 years old, Spector had written, arranged, played, sung, and produced the best-selling record in the country. Although subsequent releases by the Teddy Bears on the Imperial label were well-recorded soft pop, they did not sell, and within a year of the debut, Spector disbanded the group. Their demise was hastened by Kleinbard being seriously injured in 1960 in a car accident.

Spector was not the only Teddy Bear who went on to a music career after the group broke up. Annette Kleinbard continued to write and record songs, and changed her name to Carol Connors. Among her credits are the Rip Chords hit "Hey Little Cobra", and the Academy Awards nominated Rocky theme song, "Gonna Fly Now", co-written with Ayn Robbins. Leib joined the Hollywood Argyles, played guitar on some of Duane Eddy's records and produced material recorded by the Everly Brothers amongst others.

== Discography ==
=== Studio album ===
- The Teddy Bears Sing! (1959)

=== Singles ===
Title	Year	Label	Peak chart positions					Album
Title	Year	Label	US Hot	US CB	US RW	US R&B	UK	Album
"To Know Him Is to Love Him" b/w "Don't You Worry My Little Pet"	1958	Doré	1	1	1	10	2	Non-album single
"Oh, Why?" b/w "I Don't Need You Anymore"	1959	Imperial	91; 98	53	50	—	—	The Teddy Bears Sing!
"If You Only Knew (The Love I Have For You)" b/w "You Said Goodbye" (from The Teddy Bears Sing!)	1959	Imperial	—	—	—	—	—	Non-album singles
"Wonderful, Lovable You" b/w "Till You'll Be Mine"	1959	Doré	—	—	108	—	—	Non-album singles
"Don't Go Away" b/w "Seven Lonely Days"	1959	Imperial	—	—	—	—	—	The Teddy Bears Sing!
"—" denotes release did not chart.
