= Suddenly There's a Valley =

Single by Gogi Grant

from the album Suddenly There's Gogi Grant
- B-side: "Love Is"
- Released: July 1955
- Recorded: 1955
- Genre: Traditional pop
- Length: 2:53
- Label: Era
- Songwriters: Chuck Meyer, Biff Jones
- Producer: Buddy Bregman

Gogi Grant singles chronology
"Forget Me Not" (1952)	"Suddenly There's a Valley" (1955)	"Who Are We?" (1956)

"Suddenly There's a Valley" is a popular song written by Chuck Meyer and Biff Jones and published in 1955.

The song was a major hit for Gogi Grant (one of only two major ones she had, and one of three that charted for her) in 1955. Her recording was issued by Era Records as catalog number 1003 and reached Billboard's Top 100 chart, peaking at No. 9.

On the Cash Box Best-Selling Record chart, where all versions were combined, the song reached No. 8.

== Other notable recordings ==
- Jo Stafford – recorded August 12, 1955 (Columbia Records catalog number 40559). This reached No. 13 in Billboard's Top 100 chart.
- Bing Crosby – recorded November 23, 1955, with Buddy Cole and His Orchestra for Decca Records.
- Patty Andrews – recorded for Capitol Records. Charted at No. 69 on Billboard Top 100 in November 1955.
- Julius La Rosa (Cadence Records catalog number 1270) (1955). This also charted reaching No. 29 in Billboard's Top 100.
- The Mills Brothers – recorded September 1, 1955, for Decca Records (catalog No. 29686). This also hit the Billboard Top 100 although it is not listed as a best-seller by Cashbox.
- Petula Clark had a Top Ten hit in the 1955 UK Singles Chart with her version. It was her third hit single. It competed in the chart with a version by Lee Lawrence, which peaked at No. 14.
- Edith Piaf recorded a French-language version, "Soudain une vallée", in February 1956 which outsold all previous versions of the song in Europe, but she never performed it on stage.
- Vera Lynn recorded a German version on 1 December 1955 under the title "Folge dem Rat deines Herzens (Follow your heart's advice)", and it was released as a single in early 1956 on Decca (D 18 172).
- Jane Froman – included on her album Faith (1956).
- Dorsey Burnette – included in his album Tall Oak Tree (1960).
- The Drifters – as the B-side to their single "I Count the Tears" on Atlantic Records. (1960).
- Andy Williams – included on his album The Village of St. Bernadette (1960).
- The Kingsmen Quartet used the song on a gospel album of the same name in 1971.
- Reba McEntire recorded the song on her 1980 country album Feel the Fire.
- Glen Campbell recorded the song on his 1989 gospel album Favorite Hymns.
