= Ayn Robbins =

American lyricist and poet

Ayn Robbins is a lyricist and poet. She is best known for co-writing with Carol Connors the lyrics for two Academy Award and Grammy nominated songs, "Gonna Fly Now" from Rocky (1976; music by Bill Conti) and "Someone's Waiting for You" from The Rescuers (1977; music by Sammy Fain).
