= Surfin' =

1961 single by the Beach Boys

Single by the Beach Boys

from the album Surfin' Safari
- B-side: "Luau"
- Written: August–September 1961
- Published: September 15, 1961
- Released: November 27, 1961
- Recorded: November 1961
- Studio: World Pacific (Los Angeles)
- Genre: California sound; doo-wop; rock and roll
- Length: 2:12
- Label: Candix
- Songwriters: Brian Wilson; Mike Love
- Producers: Dorinda Morgan; Hite Morgan

The Beach Boys singles chronology
"Surfin'" (1961)	"Surfin' Safari" (1962)

Licensed audio
- "Surfin'" on YouTube

"Surfin'" is a song by American rock band the Beach Boys that was written by Brian Wilson and Mike Love. It was released as the debut single by the Beach Boys (with "Luau" as the B-side) on November 27, 1961 on Candix Records and was included on the October 1962 album Surfin' Safari.

The single effectively began the Beach Boys' career, establishing them at the vanguard of what was later dubbed the "California sound". It peaked at number 75 in the U.S. and was never released in the UK. The Beach Boys later re-recorded the song for their 1992 album Summer in Paradise. Love re-recorded it for his 2019 solo album 12 Sides of Summer.

== Background and authorship ==
In his book Becoming the Beach Boys, 1961–1963 (2015), James Murphy prefaces the chapter concerned with "Surfin'" with a warning to the reader: Murphy writes that accounts of the events surrounding the conception, making, and release of the song are "addled with errors and incongruities" and have "frustrated music historians and writers for more than fifty years".

In 1960, for his final project at his Hawthorne High music class, Brian Wilson had submitted a 32-measure musical composition instead of the 120-measure piano sonata that his teacher Fred Morgan had requested. In Morgan's recollection, "Instead of writing a sonata, he wrote [a melody that later became] the song called 'Surfin''." Thus, Wilson was given a failing grade on the assignment. (Note: Morgan said, "I had nothing against the song; it was nice, but it just wasn't what I asked him for.") However, Wilson's mother Audree disputed Morgan's account and contended that the composition had not actually been "Surfin'". Biographer David Leaf writes that the contents of Wilson's submission have since "been lost in time". (Note: Nonetheless, in 2018, the current principal of Hawthorne High School amended Wilson's grade to an A – and not for "Surfin'", but for "Surfin' U.S.A.".)

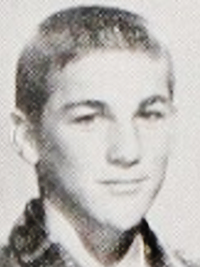
Dennis Wilson, a surfer, inspired his brother Brian to write the song.

All accounts credit Dennis Wilson's interest in surfing with inspiring the choice of subject matter. Brian recalled that his brother had made the suggestion to write a surfing song, after which Brian conceived "Surfin'" while repeatedly singing the title line at his piano. In his recollection, it was within hours that he completed the song and titled it "Surfin'". The Wilson brothers' cousin, Mike Love, is credited with contributing the lyrics and the "bom-dip-di-dip" hook, which had been lifted from Jan and Dean's 1959 hit "Baby Talk". "I wanted it to have a doo-wop sound", Love said.

Early rehearsal tapes include an audible remark, from Brian, in which he credits the song to himself, his brothers Carl and Dennis, and Love. Brian is heard saying, "Dennis and Carl got the great idea. Mike and I just got a few ideas." This was followed by an argument over the writing credits, with Dennis remarking, "We all wrote a tremendous amount of words." In a later interview, Dennis stated that he did not contribute to the writing of the song. Murphy states that Al Jardine's involvement, if any, is unclear. Only Brian and Mike are credited as writers on the final product.

== Early rehearsals ==
In August 1961, Al Jardine contacted Wilson to help record a rendition of "The Wreck of the John B" at Hite and Dorinda Morgan's Stereo Masters studio. Carl, Dennis, and Love then accompanied them on the visit. Jardine said, "That was the pretense in which we went down to the studio. I called Brian and suggested to him we record some folk music." Dorinda recalled that the group auditioned with top 10 pop hits, possibly including "Duke of Earl", but the couple were unimpressed and suggested that the group write some originals. Dennis exclaimed that a surf song had never been tried before. (Note: He was likely unaware of the Talismen's "Surfin' Man" (1960) and the Pentagons' "Down at the Beach" (1961).)

Dorinda said that the group immediately set about writing "Surfin'" and later left the studio with only a rough draft of the song. Love remembered that the group "manufactured an instant surfing song after having spoken to ... Hite Morgan. ... We prevailed upon him saying, 'Give us some time to come up with a song.'" They later returned to Stereo Masters and previewed their new work to the Morgans. They thought the song needed further refinement, but expressed interest in recording it.

Brian's home recordings of the band's rehearsals for "Surfin'" at this juncture were later released on Good Vibrations: Thirty Years of the Beach Boys (1993), Hawthorne, CA (2003), and the unauthorized Garage Tapes (2007). Jardine is not audible on these recordings, and it is possible that Wilson intended the recording group to consist only of himself, his brothers, and cousin to match the same family model as the Four Freshmen.

== Rented instruments ==
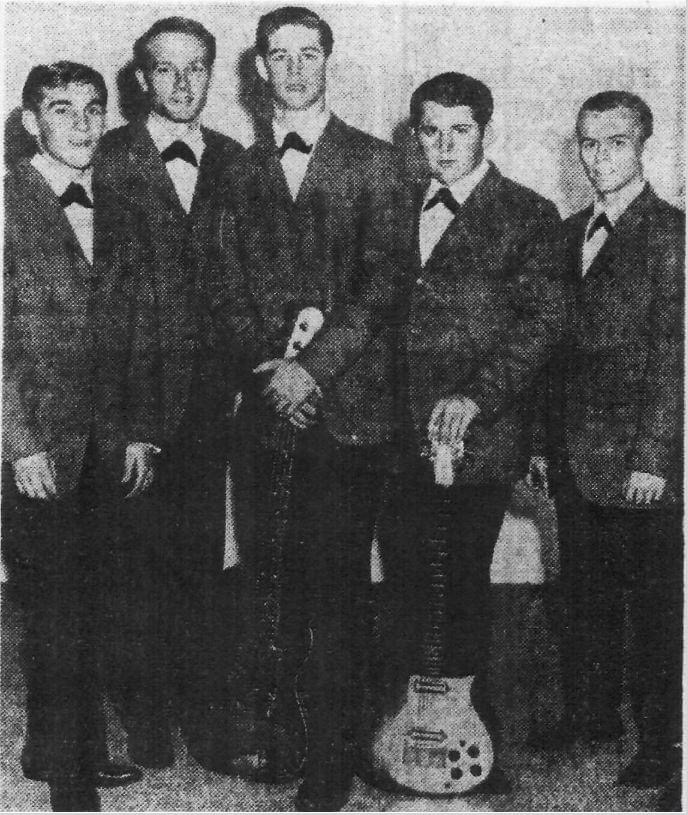
The Beach Boys on New Year's Eve 1961, a month after they had acquired instruments and recorded the song. From left: Dennis Wilson, Mike Love, Brian and Carl Wilson, and Al Jardine.

In early November the Wilsons' parents, Murry and Audree, vacationed in Mexico City for three days. According to Murphy, "Everything about this trip is controversial—when they went, where they went, how long they stayed, and how much money Murry left with the boys while they were gone."

According to most accounts, which sourced this information from Murry, he and Audree left their children with the refrigerator stocked, and, if the children chose to eat out, a sum of cash. Reports of the exact sum range from a likely $80 to an unlikely $800. The day after the parents left, the group went down to a music store and rented instruments with their food money. Jardine said, "The story that we used the grocery money, which is a great story, really sounds great in print, [but] it's not true, cause we all ate the damn grocery money long before we rented the equipment." In reality, the group obtained the funds from Jardine's mother, who loaned them $300.

Brian played guitar, Jardine took standup bass, and Dennis chose drums. Brian said that in order to make a rock and roll sound, he would play bass while Carl played guitar and Mike Love played the saxophone, despite not having any prior experience. David Marks remembered, "I wasn't really in the group then. I was practicing with them, but Al was playing upright bass with the group. I was just their kid friend from across the street going, 'Hey guys, can I play too? Can I, huh, huh?'"

The group set up their music equipment inside the Wilsons' home and held jam sessions while the parents were away. Audree remembered that she and Murry had barely entered the room when the band said they had something to play for the Wilson parents. She recalled, "We saw all this stuff...and they had an act ... and that's when 'Surfin'' was born." The band recorded a demo on Brian's Wollensak tape recorder.

== Recording ==
Early sessions for "Surfin'" were held at the Morgans' studio; however, there is no reliable documentation that would confirm the two exact dates. Although September 15 and October 3 were later offered by the Morgans, these dates are suspicious. Additionally, there exists a manuscript of the lyrics, handwritten by Brian, that was dated October 12. It lists every member of the group, then called "the Pendletones", whose line-up did not include Jardine or Marks.

In early November, "Surfin'" was recorded in eight takes at World Pacific Studios in Los Angeles, with the final take chosen as the master. Carl said, "We didn't know anything about the sounds or how a record was made. We just lucked out. My dad knew a publisher and we went to a studio and we made a record. And the way it sounded was the way it sounded."

== Release ==
After "Surfin'" was completed, Hite announced that he was going to transform the song into a record and release it on local radio. According to most accounts, label promotion man Russ Regan renamed the group "the Beach Boys" without approval from the band members. Brian recalled being informed of the decision through a phone call with Regan. Conversely, Love recalled that the group did not know that their name had been changed until after the record was issued, but on another occasion, supported that the group were consulted beforehand and had been unable to devise a better alternative.

"Surfin'" was released by Candix Records on November 27, 1961. On December 2, the record premiered on KFWB. By the final weeks of 1961, "Surfin'" had sold more than 40,000 copies. Morgan leased the recording to Capitol Records for inclusion on the Beach Boys' first album Surfin' Safari, where it was sped up "from the key of G to A flat". In 1965, Morgan sued Capitol after the label included the song on a compilation album. According to James B. Murphy, the court determined that "Capitol had used the recording of "Surfin'" consistent with the agreement".

== Personnel ==
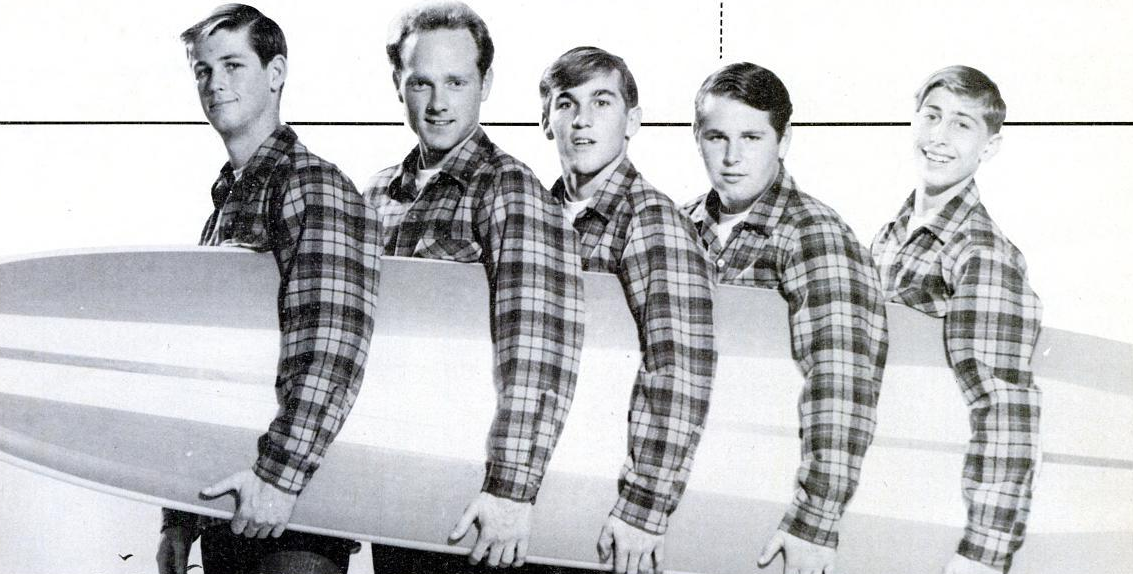
The Beach Boys at a 1962 photoshoot. By this time, Jardine had been replaced by David Marks (pictured far right).

Per James Murphy.

- Mike Love – lead vocals
- Brian Wilson – vocals, snare drum tapped with his index finger.
- Carl Wilson – vocals, acoustic guitar
- Al Jardine – vocals, stand-up bass
- Dennis Wilson – vocals

Some reports incorrectly state that the percussion was played on a pie tin or garbage can lid.

== Other versions ==
- 1963 – Jan & Dean, Jan & Dean Take Linda Surfin' (recorded with the Beach Boys)
- 1965 – Annette Funicello, Annette Sings Golden Surfin' Hits
- 1993 – The Surf Rats, Muppet Beach Party

== Charts ==
Chart (1962)	Peak position
US Billboard Hot 100	75
US Cash Box Top 100	85

== Bibliography ==
- Carlin, Peter Ames (2006). Catch a Wave: The Rise, Fall, and Redemption of the Beach Boys' Brian Wilson. Rodale. ISBN 978-1-59486-320-2.
- Howard, David N. (2004). Sonic Alchemy: Visionary Music Producers and Their Maverick Recordings (1 ed.). Milwaukee, Wisconsin: Hal Leonard. ISBN 978-0-63405-560-7.
- Leaf, David (1978). The Beach Boys and the California Myth. New York: Grosset & Dunlap. ISBN 978-0-448-14626-3.
- Murphy, James B. (2015). Becoming the Beach Boys, 1961-1963. McFarland. ISBN 978-0-7864-7365-6.
- Schinder, Scott (2007). "The Beach Boys". In Schinder, Scott; Schwartz, Andy (eds.). Icons of Rock: An Encyclopedia of the Legends Who Changed Music Forever. Greenwood Press. ISBN 978-0313338458.
- Starr, Kevin (2009). Golden Dreams: California in an Age of Abundance, 1950-1963. Oxford University Press. ISBN 978-0-19-515377-4.
- White, Timothy (1996). The Nearest Faraway Place: Brian Wilson, the Beach Boys, and the Southern Californian Experience. Macmillan. ISBN 0333649370.
