= Bob Wilson (singer) =

American songwriter

Bob Wilson (born Robert Douglas Wilson; c.1940) is a totally blind singer, guitarist and songwriter from Pleasant Hill, California. He released three singles on the Hollywood-based label Era in 1960, including the original version of "And Her Name Is Scarlet", a song that later became popular in Australia.

== Early career ==
Wilson was a member of the Pleasant Hill High School Big Band, which held its debut concert in February 1959. A review in the Oakland Tribune mentioned soloists who included Wilson on guitar, Loren Council on alto saxophone, and Len Adams on trumpet.

On Wilson's first single, released early in the following year, Adams played piano and Council played saxophone. Both sides, "Two Little Birds" and "Imogene", were written by Adams and Wilson. By this time, according to The Oakland Tribune, Wilson was a 19-year-old psychology major at College of the Pacific, Adams was studying at Diablo Valley College, and Council was still in high school.

Wilson and Adams were also credited as composers on a 1960 single by The Four-Stars on Era, "Blue Moon" (Bob Wilson) and "The Frog" (Len Adams)

== And Her Name Is Scarlet ==
The A-side of Wilson's third single, "And Her Name Is Scarlet" was later recorded by Australian duo The De Kroo Brothers and became a hit single in Australia in 1963, especially in the cities of Sydney (No. 4), Brisbane (No. 1), and Perth (No 5). The Australian single used brackets in the title, "(And Her Name Is) Scarlet", following the example of a previous version by Keith Colley.

This song was written by Era co-founder Herb Newman, although the writer credit on record labels has been to a pseudonym, either Barry Stuart or Steven Howard.

"(And Her Name Is) Scarlet" was recorded by Keith Colley in 1962 (also on Era), Johnny Burnette (1964, originally unreleased), and another Australian duo, The Brothers LeGard (also on Era, 1968).

A German-language version, "Aber du bist nicht so wie die anderen sind (And Her Name Is Scarlet)", was released in 1961 by Die Ramonas, a duo comprising Gus Backus and Hans Sojer (known as Tino Albertini).

== Bob Wilson singles discography on Era label ==
- Two Little Birds (wr. Len Adams & Bob Wilson) / Imogene (wr. Len Adams & Bob Wilson), 1960, Era #3013
- I Went To Your Wedding / Tale Of A Donkey (wr. Herbert Newman), 1960, Era #3023
- And Her Name Is Scarlet (wr. Herbert Newman) / Jailer, Jailer, 1960, Era #3027

== The Four-Stars singles discography on Era label ==
- Blue Dawn (wr. Bob Wilson) / The Frog (wr. Len Adams), 1960, Era #3021
