= Hudson & Landry =

American musical comedy team

- Origin: Los Angeles, California, U.S.
- Genres: Comedy, satire
- Years active: Early 1970s
- Label: Dore Records
- Past members: Bob Hudson; Ron Landry

Hudson & Landry were an American comedy team who wrote and recorded four gold albums on the Doré Records label in the 1970s: Hanging in There (1971), Losing Their Heads (1972), Right-Off! (1972), and The Weird Kingdom (1974). The vignette "Ajax Liquor Store" (1971) was nominated for a Grammy Award. They also wrote material for (and appeared on) Jim Backus' 1974 Doré album The Dirty Old Man.

== Partnership ==
The comedy duo was born in the early 1970s when Bob Hudson met Ron Landry while both were working at KGBS in Los Angeles. The two became a potent morning duo and it was their on-air chemistry that led to the recording of several successful comedy albums on Doré Records. Hudson & Landry recorded a total of 52 comedy vignettes, plus an unknown number of additional, shorter skits which were used as lead-ins for songs which were played on the station. 39 of them were released on 12" vinyl. Their first release was the single "Ajax Liquor Store", which was nominated for a Grammy Award. During their career, they were frequent guests on a number of popular television shows including The Flip Wilson Show, The Steve Allen Show, and Smothers Brothers specials to name a few.

== Hudson ==
"Emperor" Bob Hudson (born Robert Howard Holmes on October 7, 1929, in Erie, Pennsylvania) started in radio while serving in the United States Air Force in Anchorage, Alaska. He began his civilian career in radio during the mid-fifties first in Erie, Pennsylvania; Cleveland, Ohio; Indianapolis, Indiana; and San Francisco before arriving in the Los Angeles area. He was consistently ranked among the top 10 DJs in Southern California from 1963 until his retirement in 1988. Hudson worked at a variety of LA radio stations, including KRLA, KFWB, KBLA, KEZY, KFI and KGBS, initially coming to prominence when he replaced Bob Eubanks as morning DJ on KRLA in the spring of 1963. In 1966, Billboard ranked Hudson #1 in his morning drive time slot. He is remembered for his closing sign-off slogan recording: "Get off the freeways, peasants, His Highness is coming!" He was the rotund member of the pair. His voice personalizations frequently have the sound of an inebriated individual and generally he delivered the punch line.

The same year, he released a parody of Napoleon XIV's novelty hit "They're Coming to Take Me Away, Ha-Haaa!!", titled "I'm Normal", credited as The Emperor. The record charted nationally, peaking at #146 in the Record World survey.

Hudson was featured in The Emperor, a short film made by George Lucas in 1967 when Lucas was a student at USC film school. The film features Hudson during his time as an L.A. disc jockey.

After Hudson & Landry split up, Hudson continued working in radio, including a stint at WMEX, later WITS, in Boston, until his retirement. He recorded one comedy album with Bobby "Boris" Pickett (of "Monster Mash" fame), The Hollyweird Squares (Dore, 1976), and later teamed with disc jockey Dave (Hull) Judson for Who's on First? (Cream, 1978).

Between 1976 and 1978 (no specific date was given), Hudson attempted to record material for his stint as guest host of Casey Kasem's American Top 40 one week. Hudson had trouble recording his material, giving up after realizing that he could not host AT40 the same way he would host his morning drive show. As a result, Kasem cancelled his vacation and returned to Los Angeles to record that week's AT40. Knowing Hudson's notoriety as a legendary disk jockey and comedian, Kasem ensured that Hudson was paid for his work.

Hudson died on September 20, 1997, aged 67, and was survived by his former wife, Joanne Holmes; children Tom, Colleen, Mike, and Jay; and grandchildren Jenette, Bethany, Elizabeth, Kathleen, Chris, Pat, Rachael, Emily, and John.

The popular Hudson & Landry sketch "Frontier Christmas" features a character named "Harlo," named for his former wife Joanne's father, Harlon Rarick.

== Landry ==
Ron Landry (born October 24, 1934) worked at several radio stations in Virginia before becoming the morning host on WDRC in Hartford, CT and then WBZ in Boston. Landry began his radio career at WJMA in Orange, Virginia. Landry was a disc jockey while serving in the US Army.

After Hudson & Landry split up, Landry became a writer for television shows, including Flo, Benson, The Redd Foxx Show and Gimme a Break!. He and fellow comedy writer Tom Biener recorded Comedy Album for the Universal label in 1989. He also continued working in radio. Landry died of cancer on September 16, 2002, at age 67.

== Discography ==
Year	Album	US Country	Canada	Label
1971	Hanging in There		91	Dore
1972	Losing Their Heads	35		Dore
1973	Right Off			Dore
1974	The Weird Kingdom			Dore

Compilations of their material include The Best of Hudson & Landry (Dore, 1975), The Best of Hudson & Landry, Vol. II (Dore, 1985), and The Complete Collection (2004), a 3-CD boxed set on ITP Records, featuring rare non-LP single sides and unreleased material on the third disc.

== Singles ==
Year	Single (A-side, B-side) Both sides from same album except where indicated	US Hot 100	Canada	Album
1971	"Ajax Liquor Store" b/w "The Hippie and the Redneck"	43	75	Hanging in There
1971	"Ajax Airlines" b/w "Bruiser LaRue"	68		Losing Their Heads
1972	"Obscene Phone Bust" b/w "The Prospectors"			Losing Their Heads
1972	"The Soul Bowl" b/w "Frontier Christmas"			Right Off!
1973	"Ajax Mortuary" b/w "Ajax Pet Store"			Right Off!
1973	"A Little Boy's Dream" b/w "The Fate of the Mightiest Nation"			Non-album tracks
1973	"The Chocolate Freak" b/w "The Fate of the Mightiest Nation"			Non-album tracks
1974	"The Gas Man" b/w "Sir Basil" (from Losing Their Heads)			Non-album tracks
1974	"Montague for Governor" b/w "The Weird Kingdom"			The Weird Kingdom of Hudson & Landry
1979	"The S.O.B. (Shortage of Booze)" b/w "Harlow's Kids"			Non-album tracks
