= The Wayward Wind =

Country music standard

Single by Gogi Grant

from the album Suddenly There's Gogi Grant
- B-side: "No More Than Forever"
- Released: March 1956
- Recorded: 1955
- Genre: Country pop
- Length: 2:57
- Label: Era
- Composer: Stanley Lebowsky
- Lyricist: Herb Newman
- Producer: Buddy Bregman

Gogi Grant singles chronology
"Suddenly There's a Valley" (1955)	"The Wayward Wind" (1956)	"You're In Love" (1956)

"The Wayward Wind" is a country and pop song written by Stanley Lebowsky (music) and Herb Newman (lyrics), and first recorded by American singer Gogi Grant in 1955, and released in 1956. Grant's version reached No. 1 on both the Cash Box charts, where it remained at No. 1 for five weeks, and the Billboard charts, remaining at No. 1 for six weeks, ending Elvis Presley's seven-week run at No. 1 with "Heartbreak Hotel". It remained in the top ten for 15 weeks, and was ranked as the No. 5 song for 1956 according to Billboard. It became a Gold record. Members of the Western Writers of America chose the song as one of the Top 100 Western songs of all time.

== Background ==
The "Wayward Wind" of the title is a metaphor for wanderlust: an irrepressible urge to travel and explore. This is further emphasized by describing it as a "restless wind." In the context of the 19th century setting of shanty towns and railroads, the Western United States was still largely unexplored by European settlers. Concurrent to the era of lone cowboys on horseback, the First transcontinental railroad was built.

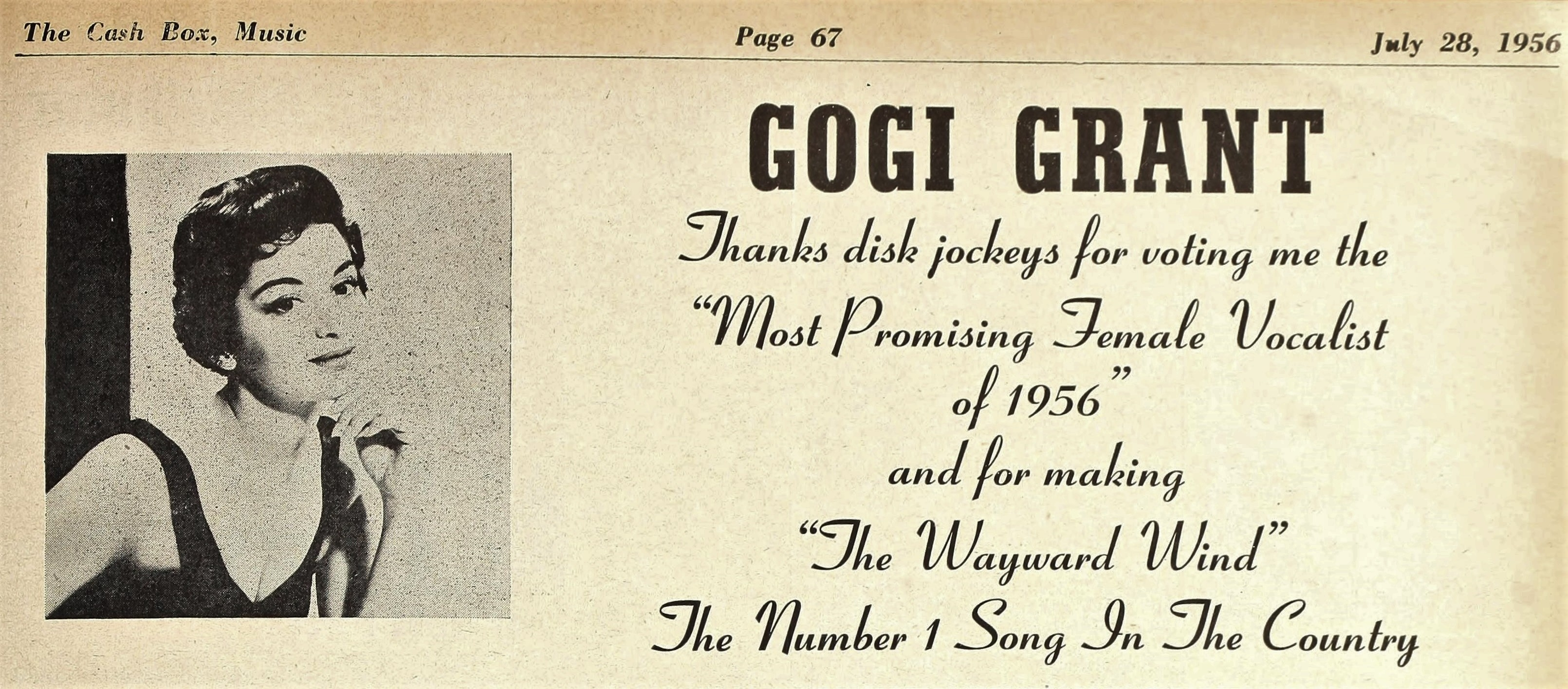
Notice in Cash Box magazine, July 1956

Steam trains were a gateway the American frontier romanticized in literature, songs and film. The subject of the song is a young man who lives near train tracks; the sound of passing trains instills him with an irrepressible urge to travel. On his journeys he falls in love and attempts to settle down and lead a normal life, but the urge to wander is too strong. The phrase "Next of kin", which is a colloquialism meaning the person's closest living relative, may suggest that the wandering man has no family or connection and will perhaps wander his entire life.

Originally recorded and sung in third person narration from the point of view of the young man's lover/wife, by female pop singer Gogi Grant, the song is often adapted to male singers and sung in first person from the point of view of the young man.

== Recordings ==
In 1956, other versions were recorded, including versions by Tex Ritter, and Jimmy Young, with Ritter's version proving popular in England, reaching No. 8 on the UK charts. Ritter used the song to open his stage shows.

In 1961, Grant's recording was reissued and reached Billboard No. 50 and Cash Box No. 78. In 1963, a new recording was made by Frank Ifield, which reached No. 1 on the UK Singles Chart for three weeks duration.

The song made the Billboard country chart in a version by Irish flautist James Galway with vocal accompaniment by American country singer Sylvia. Produced in Nashville by Bill Pursell, the single was released in 1982 and it rose to No. 57 in 1983.

== In popular culture ==
Neil Young named Gogi Grant's recording as one of the five songs that most inspired him when growing up, noting that, "I think it was grade four, I heard this song and for some reason, I associate it with the school and the highway, and the railroad tracks going behind the school."

== Notable cover versions ==
- Tex Ritter (1956) No. 28 (U.S.), No. 8 (UK)
- Jimmy Young (1956) No. 27 (UK)
- Gene Vincent on the album A Gene Vincent Record Date (1958)
- Sam Cooke on the album Hits of the 50's (1960)
- The Everly Brothers on the album Both Sides of an Evening (1961)
- Patsy Cline on the album Showcase (1961)
- Eddy Arnold on the album Cattle Call (1963)
- Frank Ifield (1963) No. 1 (UK), No. 16 (Australia), No. 3 (Ireland), No. 104 (U.S.)
- Crystal Gayle on the album When I Dream (1978)
- James Galway featuring Sylvia (1982) No. 57 (U.S.); No. 29 (CAN-Country); No. 13 (CAN-AC)
- Neil Young on the album Old Ways (1985)
- Anne Murray (1994) No. 7 (Canada Country); No. 6 (Can AC); No. 70 (Can Top 100) Anne Murray recorded a version of the song for her album Croonin' (1993)
- The Waterboys on the album Fisherman's Box (2017, recorded in 1986)
- Meat Puppets recorded a live version in Holland (1994, released on 2023's Camp Songs)

== Chart performance ==
=== Anne Murray ===
Chart (1994)	Peak position
Canada Top Singles (RPM)	70
Canada Adult Contemporary (RPM)	6
Canada Country Singles (RPM)	7

==== Year-end charts ====
Chart (1994)	Position
Canada Adult Contemporary Tracks (RPM)	44
Canada Country Tracks (RPM)	69
