= Jewel Akens =

American R&B singer (1933–2013)

Background information
- Born: Jewel Eugene Akens; September 12, 1933; Houston, Texas, U.S.
- Died: March 1, 2013 (aged 79) Inglewood, California, U.S.
- Occupations: Singer, record producer

Jewel Eugene Akens (September 12, 1933 – March 1, 2013) was an American singer and record producer.

== Career ==
He recorded with The Medallions on Dootone, with the Four Dots on Freedom, and then with singer Eddie Daniels as "Jewel and Eddie" on the Silver Records label in 1960. A number of his recordings featured Eddie Cochran on guitar. He later went solo and recorded "The Birds and the Bees" in 1964, on the Era Records label. The single went to Number 3 in the Billboard Hot 100 chart that year, and Number 2 on the Cash Box chart, and was Number 2 for four weeks on Canada's CHUM Chart, kept out of Number 1 by the Beatles and Herman's Hermits. It reached Number 29 in the UK Singles Chart. It sold over one million copies, and was awarded a gold disc. But the follow-up, "Georgie Porgie" only reached Number 68.

Akens toured regularly since 1965 and included a tribute to his mentor, Sam Cooke, in most of his shows. He also fronted a group billing itself as The Coasters, though it featured no actual original members of the group. Akens considered his cover versions of "Little Bitty Pretty One" by Thurston Harris and "You Better Move On" by Arthur Alexander to be his best work. He toured with The Monkees in the late 1960s and continued in the music business until the middle of the 1970s. Akens undertook more shows (2006–2011) with a new set of Dots, that consisted of Al Martin, Hurley D and songwriter and producer Richard Dickson.

== Death ==
On March 1, 2013, Akens died from complications of back surgery, aged 79. He is buried in the Mausoleum of the Golden West in Inglewood Park Cemetery.

He is survived by his wife, Eddie Mae.

== See also ==
- List of 1960s one-hit wonders in the United States
