= Chanson D'Amour =

1958 song by Wayne Shanklin

"Chanson D'Amour (Song of Love)"

Single by Art & Dotty Todd
- B-side: "Along the Trail with You"
- Released: March 1958
- Recorded: 1958
- Length: 2:48
- Label: Era
- Songwriter: Wayne Shanklin

"Chanson D'Amour" (French for 'Love Song'; pronounced [ʃɑ̃sɔ̃ damuʁ]) is a popular song written by Wayne Shanklin. A 1977 recording by the Manhattan Transfer was an international hit, reaching number one on the UK Singles Chart.

== Original version ==
In 1958, the husband and wife team of Art and Dotty Todd were the resident act at the Chapman Park Hotel in Los Angeles. They were known in their native United States as veterans of the California lounge circuit; the Todds also sang on their own radio show. Art Todd recalls how Wayne Shanklin gave the duo the song "Chanson D'Amour": "Wayne Shanklin stopped us one day and said, 'I've got a great song for you.'" Shanklin produced a demo of Art and Dotty Todd singing "Chanson D'Amour" which was shopped to Era Records, who released the demo track as a single. According to Art Todd: "The airplay was just sensational. This was just at the beginning of rock 'n' roll and the old-time DJs hated rock 'n' roll and they jumped on our song." Art and Dotty Todd's "Chanson D'Amour" was a Top Ten hit and reached #6 in April 1958, and crossed over to the R&B chart and reached #9.

== Manhattan Transfer recording ==
"Chanson D'Amour"

Single by The Manhattan Transfer

from the album Coming Out
- B-side: "Helpless" (mainland Europe) "The Thought of Loving You" (Australia) "Popsicle Toes" (other countries)
- Released: 1977
- Genre: Jazz
- Length: 2:55
- Label: Atlantic
- Songwriter: Wayne Shanklin
- Producer: Richard Perry

The Manhattan Transfer recorded "Chanson D'Amour" for their 1976 Richard Perry-produced album Coming Out. The song came to the group's producer, Richard Perry's, attention as a demo on cassette. The group and Richard listened, and immediately decided to record the song. Janis Siegel sang the lead in an Edith Piaf style, and it was recorded in one take.

Overlooked in the United States on its single release, the Manhattan Transfer's version of "Chanson D'Amour" became a European hit, making the charts in France at the start of 1977 to peak there at #8: the track subsequently became a hit in Germany (#20), the Netherlands (#6), Norway (#1 for two weeks) and Switzerland (#6). In the English-speaking world, "Chanson D'Amour" afforded the Manhattan Transfer a chart-topping hit, reaching #1 in March 1977 in both the UK – for three weeks – and Ireland. It was also a hit in Australia (#9), New Zealand (#14) and South Africa (#14). "Chanson D'Amour" proved to be the Manhattan Transfer's most widespread international success, despite being only moderately successful in the group's native United States, where the track registered on Easy Listening chart in Billboard at #16.

== Personnel ==
Manhattan Transfer

- Tim Hauser, Janis Siegel – vocals, arranger
- Laurel Massé, Alan Paul – vocals

Musicians

- John Barnes – piano
- Steve Paietta – accordion
- Ira Newborn, Ben Benay – guitar
- Andy Muson – bass
- Jim Gordon – drums

== Charts ==
Chart (1976–1977)	Peak position
Australia (Kent Music Report)	9
Belgium (Ultratop 50 Flanders)	3
Canada Adult Contemporary (RPM)	14
Finland (Suomen virallinen lista)	13
France (IFOP)	8
Germany (GfK)	20
Ireland (IRMA)	1
Netherlands (Single Top 100)	6
New Zealand (Recorded Music NZ)	14
Norway (VG-lista)	1
Spain (AFYVE)	5
Switzerland (Schweizer Hitparade)	6
UK Singles (Official Charts)	1

== Other versions ==
"Chanson D'Amour"

Single by The Lettermen

from the album Warm
- B-side: "She Don't Want Me Now"
- Released: 1966
- Length: 2:29
- Label: Capitol
- Songwriter: Wayne Shanklin
- Producer: Steve Douglas

The Lettermen singles chronology
"I Only Have Eyes for You" (1966)	"Chanson D'Amour" (1966)	"Our Winter Love" (1967)

The Fontane Sisters recorded a version of "Chanson D'Amour" which charted concurrently with the Art and Dotty Todd version, with the Fontane Sisters version peaking at #12 and affording the group their last major hit (the group would have one more entry in the Billboard Hot 100: "Jealous Heart" at #94). In the UK both the Art and Dotty Todd and Fontane Sisters versions of "Chanson D'Amour" were issued along with domestic covers by Tony Brent and Steve Martin.

Also in 1958, Belgian singer Angèle Durand recorded a version which rendered the English lyrics into German; this "Chanson D'Amour" became Durand's signature song. Wendy Van Wanten rerecorded this version in 1998.

In 1959 a Finnish rendering of "Chanson D'Amour" was recorded by the vocal group Jokerit: this version was rerecorded in 1977 – subsequent to the success of the Manhattan Transfer version – by Ami Aspelund, and also by Lea Laven, and Silhuetit (fi) (album Jos Mulle Sydämesi Annat).

The song had made an interim Easy Listening chart appearance in 1966, when a remake by the Lettermen reached #8.

The Frank Farian-produced disco group La Mama had a 1981 single release with a remake of "Chanson D'Amour".

In 1993 The King's Singers recorded their arrangement of "Chanson D'Amour" on their album titled by the same name, Chanson D'Amour.
