= To Know Him Is to Love Him =

1958 single by The Teddy Bears

Single by the Teddy Bears
- B-side: "Don't You Worry My Little Pet"
- Released: September 1958
- Genre: Pop
- Length: 2:18
- Label: Doré
- Songwriter: Phil Spector

The Teddy Bears singles chronology
| "To Know Him Is to Love Him" (1958) | "I Don't Need You Anymore" (1959) |

"To Know Him Is to Love Him" is a song written by Phil Spector, inspired by the words on his father's gravestone, "To Know Him Was to Love Him". It was first recorded by the only vocal group of which he was a member, the Teddy Bears. The single spent three weeks at No. 1 on the Billboard Hot 100 chart in 1958, while reaching No. 2 on the UK's New Musical Express chart. Peter & Gordon and Bobby Vinton later each experienced chart success with the song (with its title and lyrics altered to the gender-neutral "To Know You Is to Love You"), in 1965 and 1968, respectively.

In 1987, the song was resurrected in a country style by the vocal group Trio—consisting of Dolly Parton, Linda Ronstadt, and Emmylou Harris—and featured on their album Trio (1987), topping the US Hot Country Songs chart and the Canadian country music chart.

The song is in 12/8 time, played at a steady pace.

== Chart performance ==
| Chart (1958) | Peak position |
|---|---|
| U.S. Billboard Hot 100 | 1 |
| UK (New Musical Express) | 2 |
| Canada CHUM Chart | 1 |
| U.S. Billboard Hot R&B Sides | 10 |

=== All-time charts ===
| Chart (1958–2018) | Position |
|---|---|
| US Billboard Hot 100 | 168 |

== Peter and Gordon version ==
"To Know You Is to Love You"

Single by Peter and Gordon

from the album True Love Ways
- B-side: "I Told You So"
- Released: 1965
- Recorded: 1965
- Genre: Pop rock
- Length: 2:33
- Label: Capitol
- Songwriter: Phil Spector
- Producer: John Burgess

Peter and Gordon singles chronology
| "True Love Ways" (1965) | "To Know You Is to Love You" (1965) | "Baby I'm Yours" (1965) |

In 1965, Peter and Gordon released a version of the song, titled "To Know You Is to Love You". Peter and Gordon's version spent 10 weeks on the UK Singles Chart, peaking at No. 5, while also reaching No. 5 on Canada's "RPM Play Sheet". In the United States, the song spent seven weeks on the Billboard Hot 100 chart, peaking at No. 24.

=== Charts ===
| Chart (1965) | Peak position |
|---|---|
| Ireland (IRMA) | 5 |
| UK Singles Chart | 5 |
| Canada – RPM Play Sheet | 5 |
| US – Billboard Hot 100 | 24 |

== Bobby Vinton version ==
"To Know You Is to Love You"

Single by Bobby Vinton

from the album Vinton
- B-side: "The Beat of My Heart"
- Released: 1969
- Recorded: 1969
- Genre: Pop
- Length: 2:21
- Label: Epic
- Songwriter: Phil Spector
- Producer: Billy Sherrill

Bobby Vinton singles chronology
| "I Love How You Love Me" (1968) | "To Know You Is to Love You" (1969) | "The Days of Sand and Shovels" (1969) |

In 1969, Bobby Vinton released a version of the song, titled "To Know You Is to Love You". Vinton's version spent seven weeks on the Billboard Hot 100 chart, peaking at No. 34, while reaching No. 8 on Billboard's Easy Listening chart, No. 16 on Canada's RPM 100, and No. 6 on RPM's Adult Contemporary chart.

=== Charts ===
| Chart (1969) | Peak position |
|---|---|
| US – Billboard Hot 100 | 34 |
| US – Billboard Easy Listening | 8 |
| Canada – RPM 100 | 16 |
| Canada – RPM Adult Contemporary | 6 |
| Canada – CHUM 30 | 14 |

== Trio (Parton/Ronstadt/Harris) version ==
"To Know Him Is to Love Him"

Single by Dolly Parton, Linda Ronstadt, and Emmylou Harris

from the album Trio
- B-side: "Farther Along"
- Released: January 26, 1987
- Genre: Country
- Length: 3:48
- Label: Warner Bros.
- Songwriter: Phil Spector
- Producer: George Massenburg

Dolly Parton singles chronology
| "We Had It All" (1986) | "To Know Him Is to Love Him" (1987) | "Telling Me Lies" (1987) |

Linda Ronstadt singles chronology
| "Somewhere Out There" (1986) | "To Know Him Is to Love Him" (1987) | "Telling Me Lies" (1987) |

Emmylou Harris singles chronology
| "Today I Started Loving You Again" (1986) | "To Know Him Is to Love Him" (1987) | "Telling Me Lies" (1987) |

In 1987, Dolly Parton, Linda Ronstadt, and Emmylou Harris, collectively called Trio, recorded a cover of the song, including it on their Grammy Award-winning, multi-platinum album Trio. The group would go on to release it as the album's first single, topping both the Canadian and American country charts. The single peaked at No. 1 on the Billboard Hot Country Songs chart for the week of May 16, 1987. The accompanying music video, directed by Star Wars creator George Lucas (Ronstadt's boyfriend at the time), aired regularly on CMT and GAC.

=== Charts ===
| Chart (1987) | Peak position |
|---|---|
| Australia (Kent Music Report) | 54 |
| U.S. Billboard Hot Country Singles | 1 |
| Canadian RPM Country Tracks | 1 |

== Other versions ==
- The Beatles recorded two versions, both retitled "To Know Her Is to Love Her". One version was on their January 1962 audition tapes with Decca, not released during the band's existence and not included on Anthology 1. The second version was recorded on 16 July 1963 for the Pop Go the Beatles radio show and was not officially released until 1994, on their Live at the BBC compilation album. John Lennon recorded his own version of the song in 1973 ("To Know Her Is to Love Her"), but it would not see release until the 1986 posthumous compilation Menlove Ave.
- Cleo Sylvestre recorded a version for Andrew Loog Oldham in 1964.
- The Shirelles included a version on their album The Shirelles Sing the Golden Oldies (1964).
- In 1972, Jody Miller released her version as a single and on the album There's a Party Goin' On. Miller's version reached No. 18 on Billboard's Hot Country Singles chart, No. 20 on Record World's Country Singles Chart, and No. 21 on the Cash Box Country Top 75 chart. It also reached No. 12 on Canada's RPM Country Playlist.
- Gary Glitter did a cover, retitled "To Know You Is to Love You", on his album Touch Me (1973).
- Steeleye Span recorded a version on their album Now We Are Six in 1974.
- In 2006, English singer Amy Winehouse used her version of the song as a B-side on the UK edition of her hit single "You Know I'm No Good", off of her debut album Back to Black (2006). She also performed the song live on BBC Radio the same year, on Pete Mitchell's programme.
- In 2010, Roger Waters and David Gilmour, formerly of Pink Floyd, reunited to perform the song for the Hoping Foundation's annual fundraiser.
