= Art and Dotty Todd =

American husband and wife singing duo

Art and Dotty Todd were an American husband and wife singing duo, who reached the top ten in the UK and the US with the hits "Broken Wings" (1953) and "Chanson D'Amour" (1958).

Dotty Todd was born Doris Dabb in Elizabeth, New Jersey, United States, on June 22, 1913. She studied the piano from an early age, giving a piano recital at Carnegie Hall at the age of 13. She was performing at the Providence Biltmore Hotel in Rhode Island when she met Art Todd – born Arthur William Todd in Baltimore, Maryland, on March 11, 1914 – a guitarist/vocalist also playing at the Biltmore; the pair met as a result of the Biltmore accidentally booking them into the same suite. The couple married in 1941 and – after Art Todd's service in the U.S. Army, where he worked in an entertainment unit – they settled in Sherman Oaks, California, with a job at the Shadow Mountain Club in Palm Desert, California, inaugurating a career on the California lounge circuit; the Todds also eventually sang on their own radio show. The duo cut records including "Heavenly Heavenly" for RCA Victor in 1952: the single flopped, but when the song, which served as its B-side,"Broken Wings" became a hit in the UK Singles Chart for the Stargazers, the Art and Dotty Todd version had a UK release charting at No. 6 (the Stargazers' version reached No. 1, while another version by Dickie Valentine reached No. 12).

In 1958, the couple were the resident act at the Chapman Park Hotel in Los Angeles. Art Todd recalled how that year "[composer] Wayne Shanklin stopped us one day and said, 'I've got a great song for you.'" Art and Dotty cut a demo of "Chanson D'Amour" which was shopped to Era Records, who released the demo track as a single. According to Art Todd: "The airplay was just sensational. This was just at the beginning of rock 'n' roll and the old-time DJs hated rock 'n' roll and they jumped on our song." Their version of "Chanson D'Amour" reached No. 6 in April 1958 in the US, selling over one million copies, attaining gold disc status.

Art and Dotty Todd continued to record for Era and then for Dart Records but were unable to overcome the increasing dominance of rock and roll, remaining one-hit wonders. With "Chanson D'Amour" making the Melody Maker top 20 in the UK, a remake by the Manhattan Transfer spent three weeks at No. 1 in 1977.

The success of "Chanson D'Amour" allowed Art and Dotty Todd to pursue their nightclub career at a higher-profile level: they regularly played the Dunes in Las Vegas, where they set a consecutive longevity record for playing one room (the Top o' the Strip) for 68 weeks (reported in Billboard magazine August 27, 1966). In 1980, the duo relocated to Honolulu, Hawaii, where they opened their own club.

Dotty Todd died in Los Angeles on December 12, 2000, at the age of 87, three months after being diagnosed with Alzheimer's disease. Art Todd died on October 10, 2007, of congestive heart failure in Honolulu at the age of 93.
