= Gogi Grant =

American pop singer (1924 - 2016)

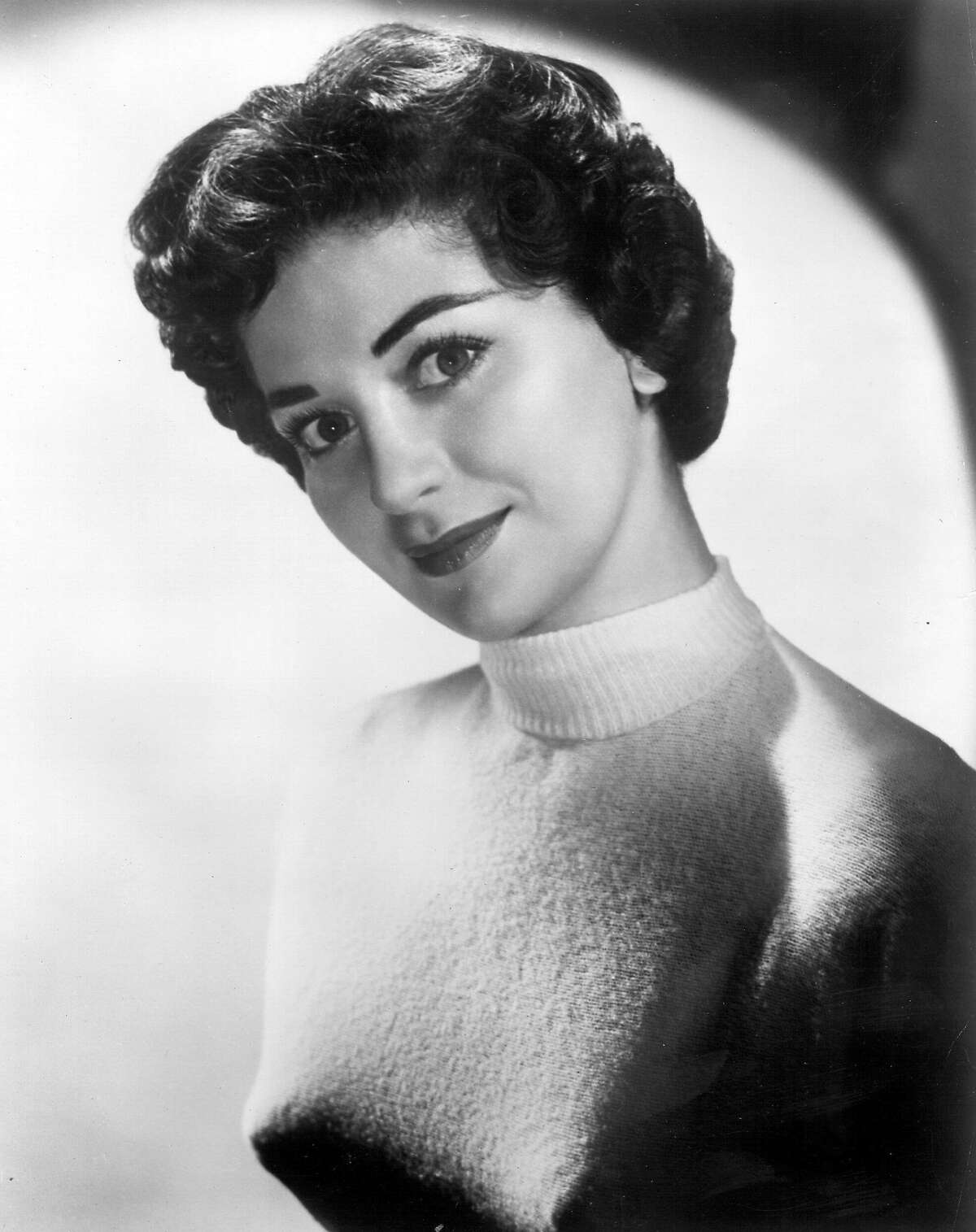
- Grant in 1955

Background information
- Born: Myrtle Audrey Arinsberg; September 20, 1924; Philadelphia, Pennsylvania, U.S.
- Died: March 10, 2016 (aged 91) Los Angeles, California, U.S.
- Genres: Jazz, vocal jazz, pop
- Occupation: Singer
- Years active: 1950s–2016
- Labels: Era, RCA Victor

Myrtle Audrey Arinsberg (September 20, 1924 – March 10, 2016), known professionally as Gogi Grant, was an American pop singer. She had a No. 1 hit in 1956 with "The Wayward Wind".

== Life and career ==
Grant was born Myrtle Audrey Arinsberg in Philadelphia, Pennsylvania, the eldest of six children of Russian Jewish parents, Rose (née Jacobson) and Alexander Arinsberg. At the age of 12, she moved to Los Angeles, where she attended Venice High School. In California, she won a teenage singing contest and appeared on television talent shows.

She worked as a car saleswoman in the early 1950s. In 1952 she began to record, using first the name "Audrey Brown" and later "Audrey Grant". She was given the name "Gogi" by Dave Kapp, the head of Artists and Repertory at RCA Victor, who liked to visit a restaurant called Gogi's LaRue. (Another source says that Grant asked Kapp, "What is a Gogi?" She continued, "His answer was, 'Darned if I know, I dreamed it last night.'")

In 1955 Grant signed with a small record company, Era Records, and had her first top ten hit with "Suddenly There's a Valley". The next year, she had an even bigger hit, reaching number 1 on the Billboard Top 100 chart with "The Wayward Wind," and holding there for six weeks. The song sold over one million copies in the United States alone, and peaked at No. 9 in the UK Singles Chart. She was voted the most popular female vocalist by Billboard magazine. This single returned to the Hot Billboard Hot 100 in 1961.

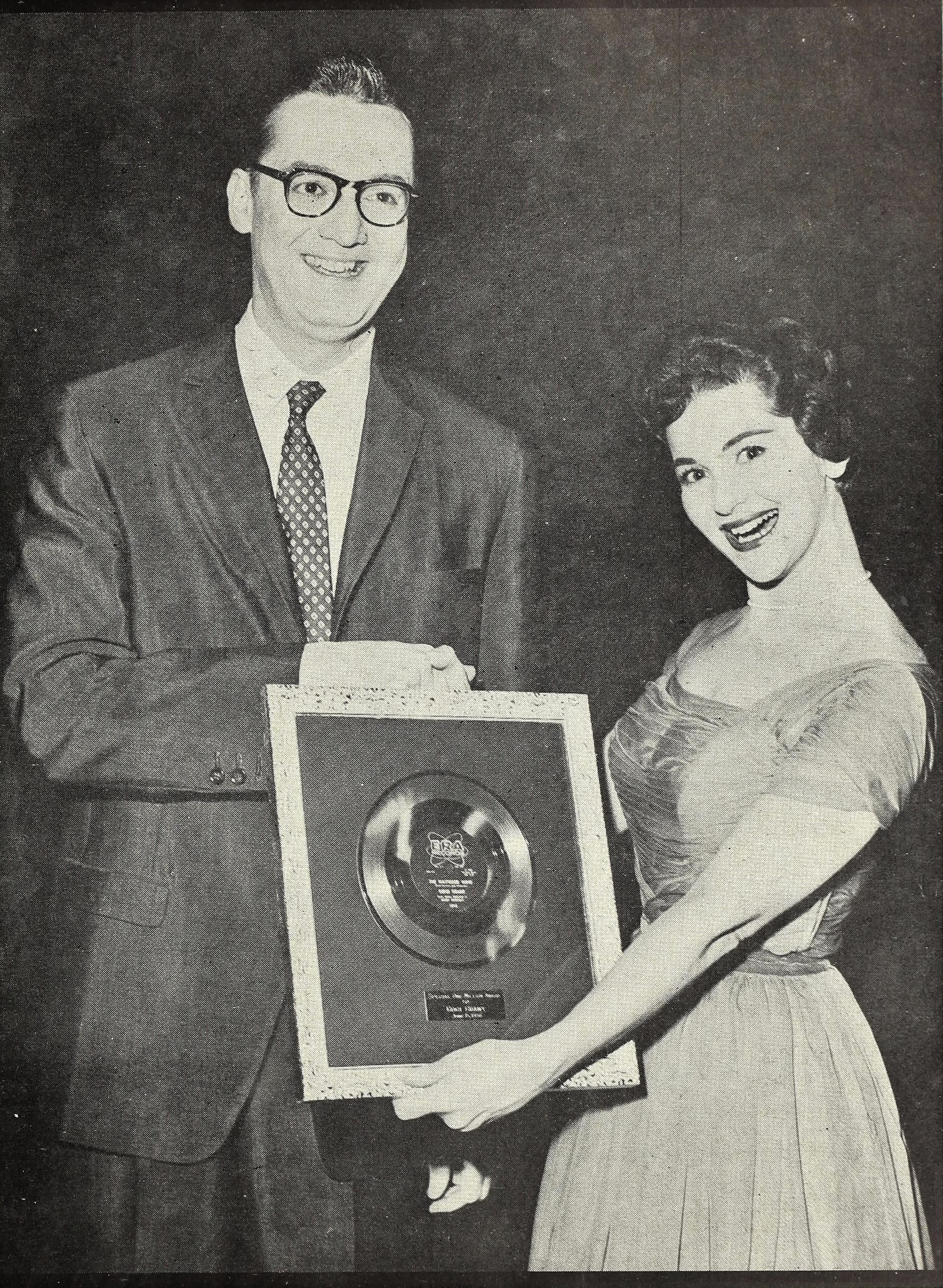
Grant presented with a Gold record from Steve Allen for "The Wayward Wind" (cover of Cash Box, August 11, 1956)

In 1957, she provided the vocals for Ann Blyth's portrayal of Helen Morgan in the biographical film, The Helen Morgan Story. The soundtrack occasioned her return to RCA Victor (the soundtrack album climbed to No. 25 in the Billboard album chart), where she had a minor hit the following year with "Strange Are the Ways of Love".

Grant was given star billing in The Big Beat in the spring of 1957. The film featured musical performances by a long list of artists, including Fats Domino, The Diamonds, the Del Vikings, The Mills Brothers, the Cal Tjader Quintet, George Shearing, and Harry James. It was produced and directed by William Cowan and was released in February 1958.

In 1958, Grant was one of the three solo singers featured in the first stereo LP of the classic musical Show Boat. Also appearing were Howard Keel, who had starred in the 1951 film version of the show, and Anne Jeffreys.

In 1959, RCA Victor released Kiss Me, Kate, in which she was featured along with Howard Keel and Anne Jeffreys, the music arranged by Henri René.

Although Grant continued to make records and appeared on television into the 1960s, her popularity declined and she initially retired from singing in 1967 after a final US chart single, "The Sea" (top 20 on the Billboard Easy Listening chart.

In 2004, at the age of 80, she sang "The Wayward Wind" on the PBS program Magic Moments.

Grant headlined with The Fabulous Palm Springs Follies in Palm Springs, California. One of her more notable appearances of her later years was with the Follies on December 31, 2006. She was still performing as late as 2013, at the age of 89.

== Personal life and death ==
In 1959, Grant married attorney Robert Rifkind. The couple had two children. Later in life, Grant underwent cancer surgery and was in remission. She died in Los Angeles on March 10, 2016, at the age of 91. Her death was announced by her son, Joshua Beckett. She also had a daughter, Jeri Brown.

== Discography ==
=== Chart singles ===
Year	Single	Chart Positions	
Year	Single	US Pop	UK
1955	"Suddenly There's a Valley"	9	-
1956	"Who Are We"	62	-
1956	"The Wayward Wind"	1	9
1956	"You're In Love" / "When the Tide Is High"	69; 75	- -
1958	"Strange Are the Ways of Love"	80	-
1961	"The Wayward Wind" (reissue)	50	-

=== Albums ===
- Suddenly There's Gogi Grant (Era, US; London UK, 1957)
- The Helen Morgan Story (RCA Victor, 1958)
- Welcome to My Heart (RCA Victor, 1958)
- Torch Time (RCA Victor, 1958)
- Show Boat & Howard Keel, Anne Jeffreys (RCA Victor, 1958)
- Kiss Me Kate & Howard Keel, Anne Jeffreys (RCA Victor 1959)
- Granted It's Gogi (RCA Victor, 1959)
- If You Want to Get to Heaven, Shout (Liberty, 1960)
- City Girl in the Country (CRC-Charter, 1964)
- Gogi Grant (Pete, 1968)
- The Way a Woman Feels (Pete, 1970)
- With All My Heart (Jasmine, 2009)

== Filmography ==
- Golden Ladder (1957), a "musical featurette"
- She performed on the Nat King Cole Show in 1957
- The Big Beat (1958)
