= Era Records =

Defunct American record label

- Parent company: K-tel
- Founded: 1955
- Founder: Herb Newman; Lew Bedell
- Defunct: 1990
- Distributors: Happy Tiger; K-tel
- Genre: Pop, country, rockabilly, jazz
- Country of origin: United States
- Location: Hollywood, California

Era Records was an independent American record label located in Hollywood, California.

== History ==
Era Records was founded by Herb Newman and Lew Bedell in March 1955 as a pop and rhythm and blues outlet. The label later expanded into the country and western, and jazz genres. Newman formed Era after resigning his sales position at Decca Records.

Era had a No. 1 hit in 1956 with Gogi Grant's "The Wayward Wind," for which Newman wrote the lyrics.

In 1959 Bedell sold his interest in the label to Newman.

Musicians with hits on Era include Ketty Lester ("Love Letters"), Larry Verne ("Mr. Custer"), Donnie Brooks ("Mission Bell"), Dorsey Burnette ("Tall Oak Tree"), Art & Dotty Todd ("Chanson D' Amour"), and The Castells ("So This Is Love").

Era distributed other labels, including Monogram, Gregmark, and Eden. From 1969 to 1971, Era was associated with Happy Tiger, which reissued and distributed some of Era's oldies. In 1972, Newman added the RTV label which released the psychedelic album Mu.

In the mid-1970s Newman sold the Era label and catalog to K-tel. In 1993, K-tel began reissuing some of the early Era material using the original Era label and logo.

== Notable artists ==
- Jewel Akens
- Donnie Brooks
- Dorsey Burnette
- The Castells
- The Crescents
- Keith Colley
- Gogi Grant
- Ketty Lester
- Colleen Lovett
- The Moments
- Johnny Rivers
- The Sentinals
- Mike Smith
- Larry Verne
- Ty Wagner
- Bob Wilson
- Glen Glenn

== Other labels ==
- Doré Records (Teddy Bears, Jan & Dean, Hudson & Landry)
- Happy Tiger Records (Mason Proffit, Them)
- Monogram Records (Chris Montez, Kathy Young)
- RTV
- Trey Records
- Zen Records (Pastel Six)

== See also ==
- List of record labels
