= Bobby Vinton discography =

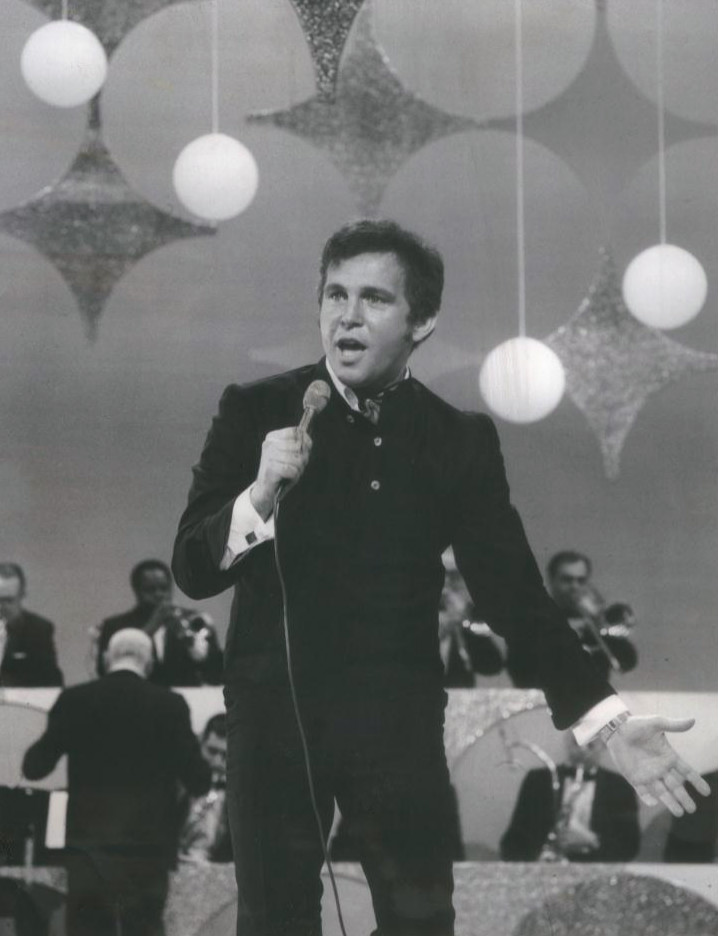
- Vinton performing in July 1969
- Studio albums: 38
- Live albums: 1
- Compilation albums: 67
- Singles: 88
- Video albums: 2

The discography of American singer-songwriter Bobby Vinton consists of 38 studio albums, 67 compilation albums, two video albums, three live albums, and 88 singles.

== Studio albums ==
- 1961: Dancing at the Hop
- 1961: Bobby Vinton Plays for His Li'l Darlin's
- 1962: Roses Are Red (US #5)
- 1962: Bobby Vinton Sings the Big Ones (US #137)
- 1963: The Greatest Hits of the Golden Groups
- 1963: Blue on Blue (reissued as Blue Velvet after the success of the hit of the same name) (US #10)
- 1964: There! I've Said It Again (US #8)
- 1964: Tell Me Why (US #31)
- 1964: A Very Merry Christmas (US #13)
- 1964: Mr. Lonely (US #18)
- 1965: Bobby Vinton Sings for Lonely Nights (US #116)
- 1965: Drive-In Movie Time
- 1966: Bobby Vinton Sings Satin Pillows and Careless (US #110)
- 1966: Country Boy
- 1967: Bobby Vinton Sings the Newest Hits
- 1967: Please Love Me Forever (US #41)
- 1968: Take Good Care of My Baby (US #164)
- 1968: I Love How You Love Me (US #21)
- 1969: Vinton (US #69)
- 1970: My Elusive Dreams (US #90)
- 1970: Sounds of Love (on sax)
- 1972: Ev'ry Day of My Life (US #72)
- 1972: Sealed With a Kiss (US #77)
- 1974: Melodies of Love (US #16)
- 1974: If That's All I Can (Released in Sony Holland)
- 1974: With Love (US #109)
- 1975: Heart of Hearts (US #108)
- 1975: The Bobby Vinton Show (US #161)
- 1976: Serenades of Love
- 1976: Party Music ~~ 20 Hits (Released in Canada)
- 1977: The Name Is Love (US #183)
- 1979: 100 Memories (Released in Canada)
- 1980: Encore
- 1987: Santa Must Be Polish
- 1988: Bobby Vinton
- 1989: Timeless
- 1990: Great Songs of Christmas
- 1992: As Time Goes By (with George Burns)
- 1998: Passion

== Live albums ==
- 1966: Live at the Copa

== Compilations ==
- 1964: Bobby Vinton's Greatest Hits (US #12)
- 1966: More of Bobby's Greatest Hits
- 1970: Bobby Vinton's Greatest Hits of Love (US #138)
- 1970: Vinton Sings Vinton
- 1971: The Love Album (US #204)
- 1971: To Each His Own
- 1972: Bobby Vinton's All-Time Greatest Hits (US #119)
- 1973: The Bobby Vinton Treasury (Columbia House 6LP set)
- 1973: Bobby Vinton Gold Disk (Epic Japan)
- 1973: Bobby Vinton: Grandes Exitos
- 1974: The Many Moods of Bobby Vinton (Columbia House 2LP set)
- 1974: The Many Moods of Bobby Vinton: Bobby Vinton...in Love (Columbia House)
- 1974: Hurt: Best of Bobby Vinton (Holland)
- 1975: Best of Bobby Vinton, 2 (Holland)
- 1975: Bobby Vinton Sings the Golden Decade of Love (US #154)
- 1976: Best of Bobby Vinton (Australia)
- 1976: K-Tel Presents Bobby Vinton - 20 Greatest Hits
- 1976: Bobby Vinton's Greatest Hits/Greatest Hits of Love
- 1978: Bobby Vinton
- 1978: Autumn Memories
- 1979: Spring Sensations
- 1979: Summer Serenades
- 1979: The Million Selling Records of Bobby Vinton (Candlelites)
- 1980: My Song
- 1981: Polka Album (Tapestry Records)
- 1981: Bobby Vinton's Greatest Hits
- 1982: Bobby Vinton Songbook(Holland)
- 1982: The Very Best of Bobby Vinton (Holland)
- 1983: His Heart-Touching Magic (Suffolk Marketing)
- 1985: The Best of Bobby Vinton (Heartland music)
- 1985: Ballads of Love (Heartland music)
- 1990: Bobby Vinton's Greatest Hits
- 1990: Blue Velvet (UK #67)
- 1991: Mr. Lonely: His Greatest Songs Today (Curb Records)
- 1991: Greatest Polka Hits of All Time (Curb Records)
- 1991: 16 Most Requested Songs (US #199; charted in 1996)
- 1991: Roses Are Red My Love(Beautiful Music Company)2LP set
- 1992: Sealed With a Kiss (Epic Germany)
- 1992: Love Songs (CBS Australia)
- 1993: The Essence of Bobby Vinton
- 1993: Bobby Vinton; Collector series, 1: Branson (Tapestry Records)
- 1993: Bobby Vinton; Collector series, 2: He (Tapestry Records)
- 1993: Bobby Vinton; Collector series, 3: Greatest Hits (Tapestry Records)
- 1993: Bobby Vinton; Collector series, 4: Country Album (Tapestry Records)
- 1993: Bobby Vinton; Collector series, 5: Polka Album (Tapestry Records)
- 1994: Bobby Vinton; His Greatest Hits and Finest Performances (Reader's Digest)3CD set
- 1994: My Greatest Hits (K-tel)
- 1995: The Ultimate Bobby Vinton (Belgium)
- 1995: Kissin' Christmas: The Bobby Vinton Christmas Album
- 1995: Roses Are Red
- 1997: 36 All time Greatest hits (Timeless Music)3 CD set
- 1998: Bobby Vinton Sings Blue Velvet: His Greatest Hits (Epic, Germany)
- 2000: Blue on Blue (with Andy Williams)2 CD set
- 2001: Bobby Vinton (U.K. Curb Records)
- 2001: The Very Best of Bobby Vinton (TV music 2CD set)
- 2001: Mr. Lonely/Country Boy
- 2001: Sealed With a Kiss/With Love
- 2001: Tell Me Why/Sings For Lonely Nights
- 2002: Ev'ry Day of My Life/Satin Pillows and Careless
- 2002: Take Good Care of My Baby/I Love How You Love Me
- 2002: Please Love Me Forever/My Elusive Dreams
- 2002: Live at the Copa/Drive-In Movie Time
- 2002: Greatest Hits
- 2002: 20 All-Time Greatest Hits
- 2002: The Legend
- 2002: Melodies of love
- 2002: Essential Bobby Vinton (Poland)
- 2003: Ultimate collection (Columbia, Australia)2CD set
- 2003: Million Dollar Polkas (Beautiful Music Company)
- 2003: Love Songs
- 2003: All-Time Greatest Hits(Varese Sarabande)
- 2004: The Best of Bobby Vinton
- 2005: The Great Bobby Vinton (Australia)3CD set
- 2005: Collections(Epic, Canada)
- 2006: Because of You: The Love Songs Collection(Varese Sarabande)
- 2006: Shalom and other Songs Written by Bobby Vinton (Tapestry Records)
- 2008: Melodies of Love / Heart of Hearts
- 2013: Ultimate Epic Singles Collection (Germany Yellow Label)2 CD set
- 2014: Roses are red (U.K. Jasmin)
- 2014: Roses are red plus Sings the Big Ones (U.K. Jackpot)
- 2015: A Very Merry Christmas: The Complete Christmas Collection
- 2016: Bobby Vinton Forever (Holland)
- 2021: Early years (U.K. Acrobat)
- 2026: Rarities Includes B sides of Epic Singles, ABC singles not including on albums, all true stereo EU 2CD set (JGJ 41635)
- 2026: LP Collection: Blue Velvet/There I've Said it Again/Vinton/Greatest Hits of Love EU 2CD set (JGJ 41636)
- 2026: LP Collection, 2: Sounds of Love/The Bobby Vinton Show/Serenades of Love/The Name is Love EU 2CD set (JGJ 41637)
- 2026 : LP Collection, 3: Party Music/If That's All I Can/Encore EU 2CD set (JGJ 41638)

== Related albums ==
- 1966: Cool 'n Clear includes "Are You Lonesome Tonight?"
- 1966: The Twelve Greatest Hits San Remo Festival, 1966 includes "Io Non Posso Crederti"
- 1972: A Tribute to Burt Bacharach includes "Blue on Blue" (Alternate take)
- 1975: The Wonderful World of Christmas includes "Silent Night"
- 2006: Polka in Paradise, Jimmy Sturr and his Orchestra. Includes guest appearance by Bobby Vinton

== Special 12-inch singles ==
- 1988: "Sealed with a Kiss" (dance version) (5:49) (instrumental) (3:46)/"Sealed with a Kiss" (radio version) (3:45) "When I Was Seventeen" (extended version) (6:12)

== Singles ==
Year	Single (A-side, B-side) Both sides from same album except where indicated	Chart positions									Album
Year	Single (A-side, B-side) Both sides from same album except where indicated	US	Cashbox	US AC	US Country	US R&B	UK	NZ	NL	VL	Album
1958	"Twilight Time" b/w "Hallelujah" (Bobby Vinton Orchestra)	-	-	-	-	-	-	-	-	-	Non-album tracks
1959	"Harlem Nocturne" b/w "Always In My Heart"	-	-	-	-	-	-	-	-	-	Non-album tracks
1959	"You'll Never Forget" b/w "First Impression"	-	-	-	-	-	-	-	-	-	Non-album tracks
1960	"A Freshman and A Sophomore" b/w "The Sheik"	-	-	-	-	-	-	-	-	-	Non-album tracks
1960	"Posin'" b/w "Tornado"	-	-	-	-	-	-	-	-	-	Dancing At The Hop
1961	"Corrine Corrina" (Bobby Vinton & His Orchestra) b/w "Little Lonely One" (Non-album track)	-	-	-	-	-	-	-	-	-	Bobby Vinton Plays For His Li'l Darlins
1961	"Well I Ask Ya" b/w "Hip-Swinging, High Stepping Drum Majorette"; Both sides with Bill Ramal	-	-	-	-	-	-	-	-	-	Non-album tracks
1962	"Roses Are Red (My Love)" b/w "You and I" (Non-album track)	1	1	1	-	5	15	1	3	5	Roses Are Red
1962	"I Love You the Way You Are"** "You're My Girl" (by Chuck & Johnny)	38	39	-	-	-	-	-	-	-	Bobby Vinton Sings The Big Ones
1962	"Rain Rain Go Away" b/w "Over and Over" (Non-album track)	12	18	4	-	-	-	-	-	-	Bobby Vinton Sings The Big Ones
1962	"Trouble Is My Middle Name" /	33	37	7	-	-	-	-	-	-	Bobby Vinton's Greatest Hits
1962	"Let's Kiss and Make Up"	38	33	10	-	-	-	-	-	-	Bobby Vinton's Greatest Hits
1963	"Over the Mountain (Across the Sea)" b/w "Faded Pictures" (Non-album track)	21	20	8	-	-	-	-	-	-	The Greatest Hits of the Golden Groups
1963	"Blue on Blue" b/w "Those Little Things" (Non-album track)	3	3	2	-	-	-	5	-	-	Blue on Blue
1963	"Blue Velvet" b/w "Is There a Place (Where I Can Go)" (Non-album track)	1	1	1	-	-	(see 1990)	1	-	-	Blue on Blue
1963	"There! I've Said It Again" b/w "The Girl With the Bow in Her Hair" (Non-album track)	1	1	1	-	-	34	1	-	-	There! I've Said It Again
1964	"My Heart Belongs to Only You" b/w "Warm and Tender"	9	8	2	-	-	-	-	-	-	There! I've Said It Again
1964	"Tell Me Why" b/w "Remembering" (From Country Boy)	13	11	3	-	-	-	-	-	-	Tell Me Why
1964	"Clinging Vine" /	17	14	2	-	-	-	-	-	-	More of Bobby's Greatest Hits
1964	"Imagination is a Magic Dream"	-	140	-	-	-	-	-	-	-	Tell Me Why
1964	"Mr. Lonely" b/w "It's Better to Have Loved" (Alternate version)	1	2	3	-	-	-	2	-	(See 1973)	Mr. Lonely
1964	"Dearest Santa" b/w "The Bell that Couldn't Jingle"	-	-	-	-	-	-	-	-	-	A Very Merry Christmas
1965	"Long Lonely Nights" b/w "Satin" (from Mr. Lonely)	17	14	5	-	-	-	-	-	-	Bobby Vinton Sings for Lonely Nights
1965	"L-O-N-E-L-Y" b/w "Graduation Tears" (Non-album track)	22	20	7	-	-	-	-	-	-	Bobby Vinton Sings for Lonely Nights
1965	"Theme from 'Harlow' (Lonely Girl)" b/w "If I Should Lose Your Love" (Non-album track)	61	69	16	-	-	-	-	-	-	Drive-In Movie Time
1965	"What Color (Is a Man)?" b/w "Love or Infatuation" (Non-album track)	38	34	-	-	-	-	-	-	-	More of Bobby's Greatest Hits
1965	"Satin Pillows" /	23	21	-	-	-	-	-	-	-	Bobby Vinton Sings Satin Pillows and Careless
1965	"Careless"	111	82	-	-	-	-	-	-	-	Bobby Vinton Sings Satin Pillows and Careless
1966	"Tears" b/w "Go Away Pain" (Non-album track)	59	43	27	-	-	-	-	-	-	More of Bobby's Greatest Hits
1966	"Dum-De-Da" b/w "Blue Clarinet" (Non-album track)	40	32	24	-	-	-	-	-	-	More of Bobby's Greatest Hits
1966	"Petticoat White (Summer Sky Blue)" b/w "All the King's Horses (and All the King's Men)"	81	76	-	-	-	-	-	-	-	Bobby Vinton Sings Satin Pillows and Careless
1966	"Coming Home Soldier" b/w "Don't Let My Mary Go Around" (Non-album track)	11	8	-	-	-	-	-	-	-	Bobby Vinton Sings the Newest Hits
1967	"For He's a Jolly Good Fellow" b/w "Sweet Maria" (Non-album track)	66	54	-	-	-	-	-	-	-	Bobby Vinton Sings the Newest Hits
1967	"Red Roses for Mom" b/w "College Town"	95	90	-	-	-	-	-	-	-	Non-album tracks
1967	"Please Love Me Forever" b/w "Miss America" (Non-album track)	6	5	39	-	-	-	-	-	-	Please Love Me Forever
1967	"Just as Much as Ever" b/w "Another Memory" (Non-album track)	24	14	10	-	-	-	-	-	-	Please Love Me Forever
1968	"Take Good Care of My Baby" b/w "Strange Sensations" (Non-album track)	33	26	14	-	-	-	-	-	-	Take Good Care of My Baby
1968	"Halfway to Paradise" b/w "Kristie" (from Vinton Sings Vinton)	23	17	8	-	-	-	-	-	-	I Love How You Love Me
1968	"I Love How You Love Me" b/w "Little Barefoot Boy" (from Take Good Care of My Baby)	9	4	2	-	-	-	-	-	-	I Love How You Love Me
1968	"For All We Know" (single version) b/w "Where is Love " (from Vinton Sings Vinton)	-	-	-	-	-	-	-	-	-	Greatest Hits of Love
1969	"To Know You Is to Love You" b/w "The Beat of My Heart" (from Vinton Sings Vinton)	34	22	8	-	-	-	-	-	-	Vinton
1969	"The Days of Sand and Shovels" b/w "So Many Lonely Girls"on Sax (Vocal version from Bobby Vinton Sings For Lonely Nights)	34	24	11	-	-	-	-	-	-	Vinton
1970	"No Arms Can Ever Hold You" (remix version) b/w "I've Got That Love' Feelin' (Back Again)" (Non-album track)	93	58	8	-	-	-	-	-	-	Vinton
1970	"Why Don't They Understand" b/w "Where is Love?" (from Vinton Sings Vinton)	109	90	23	-	-	-	-	-	-	Non-album tracks
1970	"Christmas Eve in My Home Town" b/w "Christmas Angel" (from A Very Merry Christmas)	-	-	-	-	-	-	-	-	-	Non-album tracks
1970	"My Elusive Dreams" b/w "Over and Over" Alternate version (from Vinton Sings Vinton)	46	34	7	27	-	-	-	-	-	My Elusive Dreams
1971	"I'll Make You My Baby" b/w "She Loves Me"	101	-	30	-	-	-	-	-	-	Ev'ry Day of My Life
1971	"And I Love You So" b/w "She Loves Me"	-	-	-	-	-	-	-	-	-	With Love
1971	"A Little Bit of You" b/w "God Bless America"	-	-	-	-	-	-	-	-	-	Non Albums Track
1972	"Ev'ry Day of My Life" b/w "You Can Do it to Me Anytime"	24	18	2	-	-	-	-	-	-	Ev'ry Day of My Life
1972	"Sealed With a Kiss" b/w "All My Life" (Non-album track)	19	14	2	-	-	-	-	3	4	Sealed With a Kiss
1972	"But I Do" b/w "When You Love" (from With Love)	82	71	27	-	-	-	-	-	-	Non-album track
1973	"Hurt" b/w "I Love You the Way You Are"	106	117	40	-	-	-	-	3	1	With Love
1973	"I Can't Believe That It's All Over" b/w "Clinging Vine"	-	-	-	-	-	-	-	-	-	With Love
1973	"Mr. Lonely" b/w "There! I've Said It Again" (from There! I've Said It Again)	-	-	-	-	-	-	-	-	24	Mr. Lonely
1974	"If That's All I Can" b/w "I'll Make You My Baby"	-	-	-	-	-	-	-	-	29	If That's All I Can
1974	"My Melody of Love" b/w "I'll Be Loving You"	3	2	1	-	-	-	-	-	18	Melodies of Love
1975	"Beer Barrel Polka" /	33	45	5	-	-	-	-	-	-	Heart of Hearts
1975	"Dick and Jane"	flip	87	-	-	-	-	-	-	-	Melodies of Love
1975	"Wooden Heart" b/w "Polka Pose"	58	70	23	-	-	-	-	-	-	Heart of Hearts
1975	"Midnight Show" b/w "My Gypsy Love" (from Melodies of Love)	-	78	23	-	-	-	-	-	-	Non-album track
1976	"Moonlight Serenade" b/w "Why Can't I Get Over You?" (from Heart of Hearts)	97	113	15	-	-	-	-	-	-	Serenades of Love
1976	"Save Your Kisses For Me" b/w "Love shine" (Non-album track)	75	105		-	-	-	-	-	-	Serenades of Love
1976	"Nobody But Me" b/w "Love is the Reason"	-	-	34	-	-	-	-	-	-	Non-album tracks
1977	"Only Love Can Break a Heart" b/w "Once More With Feeling"	99	105	44	-	-	-	-	-	-	The Name Is Love
1977	"Hold Me, Thrill Me, Kiss Me" Alternate version b/w "Her Name Is Love"	-	-	43	-	-	-	-	-	-	The Name Is Love
1977	"All My Todays" b/w "Strike Up the Band for Love" (from Party Music)	-	-	-	-	-	-	-	-	-	The Name Is Love
1978	"Summerlove, Sensation" b/w "My First, My Only Love"	-	-	44	-	-	-	-	-	-	Non-album tracks
1979	"Disco Polka (Pennsylvania Polka)" b/w "I Could Have Danced All Night"	-	-	47	-	-	-	-	-	-	Non-album tracks
1979	"He" b/w "My First and Only Love"	-	-	-	-	-	-	-	-	-	Encore
1980	"Make Believe It's Your First Time" b/w "I Remember Loving You" (Non-album track)	78	78	17	86	-	-	-	-	-	Encore
1981	"It Was Nice to Know You John" b/w "Ain't That Lovin' You"	-	-	-	-	-	-	-	-	-	Non-album tracks
1981	"Let Me Love You Goodbye" b/w "You Are Love" (Non-album track)	108	96	45	-	-	-	-	-	-	Encore
1982	"Forever and Ever" b/w "Ain't That Lovin' You"	-	-	-	-	-	-	-	-	-	Non-album tracks
1982	"She Will Survive (Poland)" b/w "Love is the Reason"	-	93	-	-	-	-	-	-	-	Non-album tracks
1983	"You Are Love" b/w "Ghost of Another Man"	-	-	-	87	-	-	-	-	-	Non-album tracks
1984	"Bed of Roses" b/w "I Know a Goodbye"	-	-	-	91	-	-	-	-	-	Non-album tracks
1985	"It Hurts to Be in Love" b/w "Love Makes Everything Better"	-	-	-	-	-	-	-	-	-	Non-album tracks
1986	"Sweet Lady of Liberty" b/w "Sweet Lady of Liberty"	-	-	-	-	-	-	-	-	-	Non-album tracks
1987	"Santa Must Be Polish" b/w "Santa Claus Is Coming to Town"	-	-	-	-	-	-	-	-	-	Santa Must Be Polish
1987	"Polka Radio" b/w "Birthday Polka"	-	-	-	-	-	-	-	-	-	Non album tracks
1989	"The Last Rose" b/w "Sealed With a Kiss"	-	-	-	63	-	-	-	-	-	Bobby Vinton
1989	"Please Tell Her That I Said Hello" b/w "Getting Used to Being Loved Again"	-	-	-	70	-	-	-	-	-	Timeless
1989	"It's Been One of Those Days" b/w "(Now and Then There's) A Fool Such as I"	-	-	-	64	-	-	-	-	-	Timeless
1989	"What Did You Do With Your Old 45s?" b/w "The Only Fire That Burns"	-	-	-	-	-	-	-	-	-	Timeless
1990	"Blue Velvet" b/w "Blue on Blue"	-	-	-	-	-	2	-	-	38	Blue On Blue
1990	"Roses Are Red (My Love)" (re-issue)" b/w "Ramblin' Rose"	-	-	-	-	-	71	-	-	-	Roses Are Red
1990	"Mr. Lonely (Letter to a Soldier)"	-	-	-	-	-	-	-	-	-	Mr. Lonely: His Greatest Songs Today

  - Originally recorded in the late 50s, this demo recording was released by Diamond Records to compete with Vinton's then-big hit single "Roses are Red (My Love)". The hit version was not leased to Epic for subsequent LPs, so the song had to be rerecorded for Epic.

== Recordings in other languages ==
German

- "Re-Re-Regen fallt" (Rain Rain Go Away)/"Mondscheinallee" (1962) Columbia c22269
- "Re-Re-Regen fallt" (Rain Rain Go Away)/"Rosen sind Rot" (Roses are Red) (1962) Columbia c22270

Italian

- "Io sono solo" (Mr. Lonely)/"Esse Come stanco" (L-O-N-E-L-Y) (1965) Epic 5-9900
- "Io non posso crederti"/"Satin Pillows" (1965) Epic 5-9909
- "Io sento d'amarti" (I Love How You Love Me)/"Solo" (1968) Epic 5-9976
- "Io ti daro di piu" (1965) Epic 9010 in Portugal EP

Spanish

- "Te amo como tu me amas" (I Love How You Love Me)/ "A medio camino del paraiso" (1969) CBS 22.054 (Argentine)
- "Di por que" (Tell Me Why)/"Mr. Lonely" (1965) Epic EP.9024

== Singles released in foreign countries ==
UK

- "Don't go away mad/Theme from Harlow" (1965) Columbia DB 7628
- "Lemondrops llolipops and sunbeams/"You've got your mamas eyes" (1976) Anchor AB4140

Japan

- "My blue heaven"/"Blue skies" (1963) Epic LL-6006
- "Mr. blue"/"Roses are red" (1965) Epic LL-732
- "Io non posso crederti"/"Tears" (1966) Epic LL-904
- "Paloma blanca/Where do I begin" (1976) ABC YK-820

France

- "Speak softly love"/"Green fields" (1972) Epic EPC 8304

Holland

- "End of the world/Our Day Will Come"(1972) Epic EPC 8444
- "If that's all I can/I'll make you my baby" (1974) Epic EPC 2234

== Video releases ==
- Bobby Vinton Live at the Sands Hotel on April 17, 1981 (1984)
- Bobby Vinton Live in concert at Place de Arts in Montreal on Jan. 28, 1995(2001)
- Bobby Vinton Live; Songs from My Heart (2002) Reissued in Holland as Bobby Vinton live in Branson(2013)
