= Bobby Vinton's All-Time Greatest Hits =

Greatest hits album by Bobby Vinton
- Released: November 1972
- Genre: Pop
- Label: Epic

Bobby Vinton chronology
Sealed With a Kiss (1972)	Bobby Vinton's All-Time Greatest Hits (1972)	The Bobby Vinton Treasury (1973)

Professional ratings
Review scores
Source	Rating
Allmusic	3.5/5 stars

Bobby Vinton's All-Time Greatest Hits is a two-LP collection of previously recorded songs by Bobby Vinton, released in 1972 by Epic Records. It reached #119 on the Billboard Hot 200 list of popular albums. It consists completely of singles by Vinton that were released by Epic.

== Track listing ==
Side 1
No.	Title	Writer(s)	Original album	Length
1.	"Roses Are Red (My Love)"	Paul Evans, Al Byron	Roses Are Red	2:37
2.	"Rain Rain Go Away"	Gloria Shayne, Noël Regney	Bobby Vinton Sings the Big Ones	2:55
3.	"Mr. Lonely"	Bobby Vinton, Gene Allen	Roses Are Red	2:41
4.	"Over the Mountain (Across the Sea)"	Rex Garvin	The Greatest Hits of the Golden Groups	2:23
5.	"Blue on Blue"	Hal David, Burt Bacharach	Blue on Blue	2:22

Side 2
No.	Title	Writer(s)	Original album	Length
1.	"Blue Velvet"	Bernie Wayne, Lee Morris	Blue on Blue	2:47
2.	"There! I've Said It Again"	Redd Evans, David Mann	There! I've Said It Again	2:19
3.	"My Heart Belongs to Only You"	Frank Daniels, Dorothy Daniels	There! I've Said It Again	2:41
4.	"Tell Me Why"	Al Alberts, Marty Gold	Tell Me Why	2:36
5.	"Coming Home Soldier"	Gene Allen, Bobby Vinton	Bobby Vinton Sings the Newest Hits	2:30

Side 3
No.	Title	Writer(s)	Original album	Length
1.	"Long Lonely Nights"	Lee Andrews, Bernice Davis, D.T. Henderson, Mimi Uniman	Bobby Vinton Sings for Lonely Nights	2:27
2.	"Please Love Me Forever"	Johnny Malone, Ollie Blanchard	Please Love Me Forever	2:37
3.	"Halfway to Paradise"	Gerry Goffin, Carole King	I Love How You Love Me	2:39
4.	"I Love How You Love Me"	Barry Mann, Larry Kolber	I Love How You Love Me	2:30
5.	"To Know You Is to Love You"	Phil Spector	Vinton	2:18

Side 4
No.	Title	Writer(s)	Original album	Length
1.	"The Days of Sand and Shovels"	Doyle Marsh, George Reneau	Vinton	3:45
2.	"My Elusive Dreams"	Curly Putman, Billy Sherrill	My Elusive Dreams	3:14
3.	"No Arms Can Ever Hold You"	Art Crafer, Jimmy Nebb	Vinton	2:31
4.	"I'll Make You My Baby"	Roger Atkins, Helen Miller	Ev'ry Day of My Life	2:17
5.	"Ev'ry Day of My Life"	Jimmie Crane, Al Jacobs	Ev'ry Day of My Life	2:49

== Charts ==
Chart (1972)	Peak position
US Top LPs (Billboard)	119
