= The Best of Bobby Vinton (2004 album) =

Compilation album by Bobby Vinton

Greatest hits album by Bobby Vinton
- Released: June 22, 2004
- Genre: Pop
- Label: Epic/Legacy

Bobby Vinton chronology
All-Time Greatest Hits (2003)	The Best of Bobby Vinton (2004)	The Great Bobby Vinton (2005)

The Best of Bobby Vinton is a collection of 14 Top 40 hits that Bobby Vinton had for Epic Records. It is the second compilation to be entitled The Best of Bobby Vinton, the previous collection being released in 1985. The tracks are in chronological order and begin with his first hit "Roses Are Red (My Love)" and end with "Sealed with a Kiss", his final hit for Epic. Inside the album cover is a biographical essay about Vinton's life and career that was written by Didier C. Deutsch.

== Track listing ==
Order	Title	Length	Top Billboard Hot 100 rank	Original album	Writer(s)	Ref
1	"Roses Are Red (My Love)"	2:39	1 (4 weeks)	Roses Are Red	Paul Evans, Al Byron	
2	"Rain, Rain Go Away"	2:56	12	Bobby Vinton Sings the Big Ones	Noël Regney, Gloria Shayne	
3	"Blue on Blue"	2:24	3	Blue on Blue	Burt Bacharach, Hal David	
4	"Blue Velvet"	2:48	1 (3 weeks)	Blue on Blue	Bernie Wayne, Lee Morris	
5	"There! I've Said It Again"	2:20	1 (4 weeks)	There! I've Said It Again	Redd Evans, David Mann	
6	"My Heart Belongs to Only You"	2:42	9	There! I've Said It Again	Dorothy Daniels, Frank Daniels	
7	"Tell Me Why"	2:36	13	Tell Me Why	Al Alberts, Marty Gold	
8	"Mr. Lonely"	2:41	1 (1 week)	Roses Are Red	Bobby Vinton, Gene Allan	
9	"Long Lonely Nights"	2:28	17	Bobby Vinton Sings for Lonely Nights	Lee Andrews, Larry Brown, Jocko Henderson, Mimi Uniman	
10	"L-O-N-E-L-Y"	2:26	22	Bobby Vinton Sings for Lonely Nights	Vinton	
11	"Please Love Me Forever"	2:37	6	Please Love Me Forever	John Malone, Ollie Blanchard	
12	"Halfway to Paradise"	2:40	23	I Love How You Love Me	Carole King, Gerry Goffin	
13	"I Love How You Love Me"	2:28	9	I Love How You Love Me	Barry Mann, Larry Kolber	
14	"Sealed with a Kiss"	2:48	19	Sealed with a Kiss	Peter Udell, Gary Geld	

== Album credits ==
- Didier C. Deutsch - compilation producer
- Darcy Proper - compilation producer, mastering
- Steve Berkowitz - legacy A&R
- Joy Gilbert Monfried - project director
- Stacey Boyle - A&R coordination, tape research
- Howard Fritzson - art direction
- Pat Jerina - design
- Hank Fisher/Sony Music Archives - photography (front cover, booklet back cover, spine sheet, color spread (from left)
- Vernon Smith - photography (right inset photo)
- Michael Ochs Archives - photography (B&W spread, left panel and inset photos, CD label)
- Everett Collection - photography (middle and right panels)
- Liz Reilly - photo researcher
- Fong Y. Lee - packaging manager
