= Bobby Vinton's Greatest Hits (1964 album) =

Greatest hits album by Bobby Vinton
- Released: September 1964
- Genre: Pop
- Label: Epic
- Producer: Bob Morgan

Bobby Vinton chronology
Tell Me Why (1964)	Bobby Vinton's Greatest Hits (1964)	A Very Merry Christmas (1964)

Bobby Vinton's Greatest Hits is a 12-track compilation by Bobby Vinton. It was released in September 1964, two months after his album Tell Me Why.

By the end of summer 1964, Vinton had had eleven Billboard Top 40 hits (including three No. 1's), prompting Epic Records to compile his first greatest hits album. With one gap left to fill on the package and his then-current single "Clinging Vine" working its way up the charts, Vinton requested that Epic round out the compilation with "Mr. Lonely" (previously featured on his debut vocal album Roses Are Red) and issue it as his next single in conjunction with the album. This rare gambit of reissuing and promoting an older album track paid off as "Mr. Lonely" gave Vinton his fourth, albeit last, No. 1 hit on the Billboard Hot 100.

Ten of the twelve tracks were featured on Vinton's first six vocal albums. Both charted sides of the 1963 single "Let's Kiss and Make Up"/"Trouble Is My Middle Name" make their album debut here.

The song "I Love You The Way You Are" was originally recorded in the late 50s as a demo and left unreleased. After Vinton had a hit with "Roses are Red (My Love)", Diamond Records purchased the demo and issued it as a single, reaching #38. They didn't even have another Vinton song to use as the B-side, so they put a song by Chuck and Johnny as the flip. Diamond refused to lease the single to Epic for the LP, so Epic had Vinton rerecord the song. The original hit version has never been issued on LP.

== Track listing ==
Side 1
No.	Title	Writer(s)	Original album	Length
1.	"Blue Velvet"	Bernie Wayne, Lee Morris	Blue on Blue	2:49
2.	"Roses Are Red (My Love)"	Paul Evans, Al Byron	Roses Are Red	2:38
3.	"Blue on Blue"	Hal David, Burt Bacharach	Blue on Blue	2:24
4.	"Mr. Lonely"	Bobby Vinton, Gene Allen	Roses Are Red	2:40
5.	"Let's Kiss and Make Up"	Van McCoy, Norman Meade	Epic single 9561	2:28
6.	"My Heart Belongs to Only You"	Frank Daniels, Dorothy Daniels	There! I've Said It Again	2:42

Side 2
No.	Title	Writer(s)	Original album	Length
1.	"There! I've Said It Again"	Redd Evans, David Mann	There! I've Said It Again	2:22
2.	"Rain Rain Go Away"	Gloria Shayne, Noël Regney	Bobby Vinton Sings the Big Ones	2:55
3.	"I Love You the Way You Are"	Bobby Vinton	Bobby Vinton Sings the Big Ones	2:55
4.	"Over the Mountain (Across the Sea)"	Rex Garvin	The Greatest Hits of the Golden Groups	2:23
5.	"Trouble Is My Middle Name"	Neval Nader, John Gluck Jr.	Epic single 9561	2:28
6.	"Tell Me Why"	Al Alberts, Marty Gold	Tell Me Why	2:36

== Album credits ==
- Produced by Bob Morgan
- Cover photo by Cardell Photo of Pittsburgh

== Charts ==
Album - Billboard (North America)

Year	Chart	Position
1964	The Billboard 200	12

Singles - Billboard (North America)

Year	Single	Chart	Position
1963	"Trouble Is My Middle Name"	The Billboard Hot 100	33
1963	"Trouble Is My Middle Name"	Billboard Adult Contemporary	7
1963	"Let's Kiss and Make Up"	The Billboard Hot 100	38
1964	"Tell Me Why"	The Billboard Hot 100	13
1964	"Tell Me Why"	Billboard Adult Contemporary	3
