= 16 Most Requested Songs (Bobby Vinton album) =

Compilation album by Bobby Vinton
- Released: September 3, 1991
- Genre: Pop
- Length: 40:45
- Label: Epic/Legacy

Bobby Vinton chronology
Greatest Polka Hits of All Time (1991)	16 Most Requested Songs (1991)	As Time Goes By (1992)

16 Most Requested Songs is a compilation album of 16 Top 40 hits that Bobby Vinton had for Epic Records. It is the last of 29 collections in the 16 Most Requested Songs series that was released by Epic. Unlike most collections of Vinton's music, the song "Roses Are Red (My Love)" is the last track on this album, rather than the first. Inside the album cover is a biographical essay about Vinton's life and career that was written by Will Friedwald (the author of Jazz Singing). Although this album was released in 1991, it did not enter the charts until five years later. It was the first compilation of Vinton's music in the charts since the release of Bobby Vinton Sings the Golden Decade of Love 21 years before.

== Track listing ==
No.	Title	Writer(s)	Length
1.	"Blue Velvet"	Bernie Wayne, Lee Morris	2:48
2.	"Tell Me Why"	Al Alberts, Marty Gold	2:36
3.	"To Know You Is to Love You"	Phil Spector	2:21
4.	"Take Good Care of My Baby"	Gerry Goffin, Carole King	2:46
5.	"There, I've Said It Again"	Redd Evans, David Mann	2:21
6.	"Coming Home Soldier"	Gene Allen, Bobby Vinton	2:29
7.	"Over the Mountain; Across the Sea"	Rex Garvin	2:26
8.	"Halfway to Paradise"	Gerry Goffin, Carole King	2:39
9.	"Please Love Me Forever"	John Malone, Ollie Blanchard	2:35
10.	"Blue on Blue"	Hal David, Burt Bacharach	2:29
11.	"L-O-N-E-L-Y"	Bobby Vinton	2:24
12.	"Just as Much as Ever"	Charlie Singleton, Larry Coleman	2:21
13.	"I Love How You Love Me"	Barry Mann, Larry Kolber	2:29
14.	"My Heart Belongs to Only You"	Frank Daniels, Dorothy Daniels	2:43
15.	"Mr. Lonely"	Bobby Vinton, Gene Allan	2:40
16.	"Roses Are Red"	Paul Evans, Al Byron	2:38
Total length:			40:45

== Album credits ==
- Digital producer: Nedra Olds-Neal
- Digitally remixed and remastered by Mark Wilder, Sony Music Studios, New York
- Product manager: Joanne Beattie
- Packaging coordinator: Hope Chasin
- Illustration: Bill Nelson

== Charts ==
Professional ratings
Review scores
Source	Rating
Allmusic	4.5/5 stars

Album - Billboard (North America)

Year	Chart	Position
1996	The Billboard 200	199
