= The Love Album (Bobby Vinton album) =

Compilation album by Bobby Vinton
- Released: June 1971
- Genre: Pop
- Length: 50:09
- Label: Epic
- Producer: Billy Sherrill, Robert Mersey, Bob Morgan

Bobby Vinton chronology
Vinton Sings Vinton (1970)	The Love Album (1971)	To Each His Own (1971)

The Love Album is a two-LP collection of previously recorded songs by Bobby Vinton, released in 1971 by Epic Records. This collection contains songs that are all about the subject of love. Only four singles are featured on this collection: "No Arms Can Ever Hold You", "Please Love Me Forever", "There! I've Said It Again" and "My Heart Belongs to Only You".

== Track listing ==
Side 1
No.	Title	Writer(s)	Original album	Length
1.	"This Guy's in Love With You"	Burt Bacharach, Hal David	Vinton	3:09
2.	"Till"	Carl Sigman, Charles Danvers	I Love How You Love Me	2:58
3.	"For Once in My Life"	Ron Miller, Orlando Murden	I Love How You Love Me	3:02
4.	"When I Fall in Love"	Edward Heyman, Victor Young	Vinton	2:17
5.	"No Arms Can Ever Hold You"	Art Crafer, Jimmy Nebb	Vinton	2:25

Side 2
No.	Title	Writer(s)	Original album	Length
1.	"Please Love Me Forever"	John Malone, Ollie Blanchard	Please Love Me Forever	2:36
2.	"Love Me With All Your Heart"	Maurice Vaughn, Mario Rigual, Carlos Rigual	Please Love Me Forever	2:00
3.	"To Think You've Chosen Me"	Bennie Benjamin, George David Weiss	Take Good Care of My Baby	2:21
4.	"If I Didn't Care"	Jack Lawrence	I Love How You Love Me	2:36
5.	"It's All in the Game"	Carl Sigman, Charles G. Dawes	Please Love Me Forever	2:15

Side 3
No.	Title	Writer(s)	Original album	Length
1.	"There! I've Said It Again"	Redd Evans, David Mann	There! I've Said It Again	2:20
2.	"Sunrise, Sunset"	Sheldon Harnick, Jerry Bock	Bobby Vinton Sings the Newest Hits	2:27
3.	"From Russia With Love"	Lionel Bart	Drive-In Movie Time	2:12
4.	"Too Young"	Sylvia Dee, Sidney Lippman	There! I've Said It Again	1:42
5.	"Unchained Melody"	Hy Zaret, Alex North	There! I've Said It Again	2:46

Side 4
No.	Title	Writer(s)	Original album	Length
1.	"All"	R. Jessel, Marian Grudeff, Nino Oliviero	Bobby Vinton Sings the Newest Hits	2:28
2.	"The Shadow of Your Smile"	Paul Francis Webster, Johnny Mandel	Bobby Vinton Sings the Newest Hits	2:45
3.	"The End of the World"	Sylvia Dee, Arthur Kent	Bobby Vinton Sings the Newest Hits	2:57
4.	"This Is My Song"	Charles Chaplin	Bobby Vinton Sings the Newest Hits	2:12
5.	"My Heart Belongs to Only You"	Frank Daniels, Dorothy Daniels	There! I've Said It Again	2:41

== Album credits ==
- "This Guy's in Love With You", "Till", "For Once in My Life", "When I Fall in Love", "No Arms Can Ever Hold You", "Please Love Me Forever", "Love Me With All Your Heart", "To Think You've Chosen Me", "If I Didn't Care" and "It's All in the Game" produced by Billy Sherrill
- "Sunrise, Sunset", "All", "The Shadow of Your Smile", "The End of the World" and "This Is My Song" produced, arranged and conducted by Robert Mersey
- "From Russia With Love" produced by Bob Morgan
- "This Guy's in Love With You" arranged by Bill Walker
- "Till" and "For Once in My Life" arranged by Bill McElhiney
- "There! I've Said It Again", "Too Young" and "Unchained Melody" arranged and conducted by Stan Applebaum
