= Bobby Vinton's Greatest Hits =

Bobby Vinton's Greatest Hits may refer to:

- Bobby Vinton's Greatest Hits (1964 album)
- Bobby Vinton's Greatest Hits (1990 album)

== See also ==
- Bobby Vinton discography
