= The Best of Bobby Vinton (1985 album) =

Compilation album by Bobby Vinton
- Released: 1985
- Genre: Pop
- Label: Heartland

Bobby Vinton chronology
His Heart-Touching Magic (1983)	The Best of Bobby Vinton (1985)	Ballads of Love (1985)

The Best of Bobby Vinton is a 12-track collection of previously recorded songs by Bobby Vinton; it was released in 1985. This collection contains two songs that Vinton recorded for ABC Records ("Killing Me Softly With Her Song", and "My Melody of Love", and six for Epic Records ("Roses Are Red (My Love)", "Mr. Lonely", "Blue Velvet", "There! I've Said It Again", "Blue on Blue", and "I Love How You Love Me"), and one for the Canadian label of Ahed Records ("Medley"). The last two songs, "Will You Still Love Me Tomorrow" and "Don't You Know", make their first album appearances on this collection. "My Special Angel"is re-recording and first appearance on this LP.

== Track listing ==
Side One
No.	Title	Length
1.	"Killing Me Softly With Her Song"
2.	"Roses Are Red"
3.	"Mr. Lonely"
4.	"Blue Velvet"
5.	"My Melody of Love"
6.	"My Special Angel"

Side Two
No.	Title	Length
1.	"There! I've Said It Again"
2.	"Blue on Blue"
3.	"Medley: Blueberry Hill, Only You, Young Love, Close to You, I Love You Because"
4.	"I Love How You Love Me"
5.	"Will You Still Love Me Tomorrow"
6.	"Don't You Know?"

== Album credits ==
- Selections of "Roses Are Red," "Mr. Lonely," "Blue Velvet," "There! I've Said It Again," "Blue on Blue," and "I Love How You Love Me" courtesy of CBS Special Products.
- All other selections courtesy of Rex Ford Productions, Inc.
- Special thanks to Bobby Vinton, Joseph G. Zynczak, and Alan Bernhard
