= With Love (Bobby Vinton album) =

Studio album by Bobby Vinton
- Released: November 1974
- Genre: Pop
- Label: Epic
- Producer: Bobby Vinton, Billy Sherrill, Jimmy Wisner, Bob Morgan, Dick Glasser

Bobby Vinton chronology
| Melodies of Love (1974) | With Love (1974) | Bobby Vinton Sings the Golden Decade of Love (1975) |

With Love is Bobby Vinton's twenty-fourth and final studio album for Epic Records and his twenty-fifth album overall. It was released in 1974, two years after Epic released Vinton from his contract with them and immediately after the release of Melodies of Love (Vinton's first album for ABC Records). The purpose of this release was to take advantage of the success of the aforementioned Melodies of Love and his biggest hit at the time "My Melody of Love". Two of the ten songs had previously been released on other albums, including "And I Love You So", a new version of the song originally recorded for Ev'ry Day of Life, this time produced by Billy Sherrill and arranged by Cam Mullins.

== Track listing ==
=== Side 1 ===
1. "Seasons in the Sun" - (Rod McKuen, Jacques Brel) - 3:24
2. "And I Love You So" - (Don McLean) - 2:55
3. "When You Love" - (Bobby Vinton) - 2:40
4. "Moody" - (Ekundayo Paris, Anna Mitchell) - 2:43
5. "She's Gotta Be a Saint" - (J. Paulini, Michael Di Napoli) - 2:30

=== Side 2 ===
1. "Sealed With a Kiss" - (Peter Udell, Gary Geld) - 2:52 (previously on Sealed With a Kiss)
2. "Hurt" - (Jimmie Crane, Al Jacobs) - 2:57
3. "I Love You the Way You Are" - (Bobby Vinton) - 2:46 (previously on Bobby Vinton Sings The Big Ones)
4. "Clinging Vine" - (Earl Shuman, Leon Carr, Gary Lane) - 2:27 (previously on More of Bobby's Greatest Hits)
5. "I Can't Believe That It's All Over" - (Ben Peters) - 2:24

== Personnel ==
- Bobby Vinton - producer
- Billy Sherrill - producer ("And I Love You So" and "I Can't Believe That It's All Over")
- Jimmy Wisner - producer ("Seasons in the Sun")
- Bob Morgan - producer ("Clinging Vine")
- Dick Glasser - producer ("Moody")
- Al Capps - arranger ("Sealed With a Kiss", "Hurt" and "I Love You the Way You Are")
- Bill Pursell - string arrangements ("I Can't Believe That It's All Over")
- Cam Mullins - arranger ("And I Love You So")

== Charts ==
| Chart (1974) | Peak position | Week | Ref. |
|---|---|---|---|
| Billboard 200 | 109 | December 21, 1974 | |

Singles

| Year | Single | Chart | Position |
|---|---|---|---|
| 1973 | "Hurt" | US Billboard Hot 100 | 106 |
| 1973 | "Hurt" | US Easy Listening | 40 |
| 1973 | "Hurt" | Dutch MegaCharts | 3 |
