= Live at the Copa (Bobby Vinton album) =

Live album by Bobby Vinton
- Released: 1966
- Genres: Pop, standards
- Label: Epic
- Producer: Bob Morgan

Bobby Vinton chronology
Country Boy (1966)	Live at the Copa (1966)	Bobby Vinton Sings the Newest Hits (1967)

Live at the Copa is Bobby Vinton's first live album, released in 1966.

It is a recording of a performance that Vinton made at the Copacabana in New York with the Dixieland band of the Village Stompers and the Joe Mele Orchestra. In the "Old MacDonald Medley", Vinton plays different instruments rather than sing. This performance demonstrates Vinton's range as a well-rounded performer rather than just a ballad singer.

== Track listing ==
Side 1
No.	Title	Writer(s)	Length
1.	"The Sheik of Araby"	Harry B. Smith, Francis Wheeler, Ted Snyder	1:20
2.	"Oh Marie"	Eddie DiCapua, Louis Prima	2:25
3.	"If I Ruled the World" (From the Musical Production Pickwick)	Leslie Bricusse, Cyril Ornadel	3:03
4.	"Medley: I've Got a Woman/I'm Henry VIII, I Am"	Ray Charles/Fred Murray, R.P. Weston	5:07
5.	"Hits Medley: There! I've Said It Again/Roses Are Red (My Love)/Washington Square/Blue Velvet"	Ray Evans, Dave Mann/Paul Evans, Al Byron/Bob Goldstein, David Shire/Bernie Wayne, Lee Morris	5:15
6.	"Ya Got Trouble" (From the Musical Production The Music Man)	Meredith Willson	4:25

Side 2
No.	Title	Writer(s)	Length
1.	"International Medley: Io Ti Darò di Più/C'est si bon/Cuando Calienta el Sol/Hupi Schupi/Havah Nagilah"	Memo Remigi, Alberto Testa/Henri Betti, André Hornez, Jerry Seelen/Carlos Rigual, Mario Rigual	4:28
2.	"Old MacDonald Medley: Sing Sing Sing/When the Saints Go Marching In/The Girl from Ipanema/At the Darktown Strutters' Ball"	Louis Prima/Vinicius de Moraes, Norman Gimbel, Antônio Carlos Jobim/Shelton Brooks	4:30
3.	"Mr. Lonely"	Bobby Vinton, Gene Allan	2:40
4.	"Old Time Medley: If You Knew Susie Like I Knew Susie/When My Baby Smiles at Me/Some of These Days/The Yankee Doodle Boy/Rock-a-Bye Your Baby With a Dixie Melody"	Buddy DeSylva, Joseph Meyer/Harry Von Tilzer, Andrew Sterling, Bill Munro, Ted Lewis/Shelton Brooks/George M. Cohan/Sam M. Lewis, Joe Young, Jean Schwartz	4:15
5.	"Bei Mir Bist du Schön (Means That You're Grand)"	Jacob Jacobs, Sammy Cahn, Saul Chaplin, Sholom Secunda	2:38
