= The Best of Bobby Vinton =

The Best of Bobby Vinton may refer to:

- The Best of Bobby Vinton (2004 album)
- The Best of Bobby Vinton (1985 album)
