= A Very Merry Christmas =

Studio album by Bobby Vinton
- Released: October 1964
- Genre: Pop, Christmas
- Length: 31:26
- Label: Epic
- Producer: Robert Morgan

Bobby Vinton chronology
Bobby Vinton's Greatest Hits (1964)	A Very Merry Christmas (1964)	Mr. Lonely (1964)

A Very Merry Christmas is Bobby Vinton's ninth studio album and first Christmas album, released in October 1964. Vinton had released a four-track Christmas EP which entered the charts the previous year, containing none of the tracks included on A Very Merry Christmas. Due to Billboard editorial policy, it was held off the regular Top LPs chart, but reached #13 on the Christmas Albums chart. The album was reissued on CD in 1995, and again in 2015 as the expanded A Very Merry Christmas: The Complete Epic Christmas Collection.

There were two singles to come from this album: "The Bell That Couldn't Jingle" and "Dearest Santa".

== Track listing ==
Side 1
No.	Title	Writer(s)	Length
1.	"Christmas Chopsticks"	Heider	2:12
2.	"The Bell That Couldn't Jingle"	Burt Bacharach, Lawrence Kusik	2:20
3.	"Do You Hear What I Hear"	Noël Regney, Gloria Shayne	2:53
4.	"Dearest Santa"	Bonnie Boyd, Michael Dunn	2:52
5.	"The Greatest Gift"	Bobby Vinton, Lloyd	2:28
6.	"Christmas in Killarney"	James Cavanaugh, John Redmond, Frank Weldon	2:27

Side 2
No.	Title	Writer(s)	Length
1.	"Peppermint Stick Parade"	Manning, Lenwood Morris	1:52
2.	"Christmas Angel"	Bobby Vinton, Lloyd	2:45
3.	"The Christmas Tree"	Goodwin	3:04
4.	"Three Wise Men, Wise Men Three"	Noël Regney, Gloria Shayne	2:40
5.	"White Christmas"	Irving Berlin	2:37
6.	"My Christmas Prayer"	Lyn Duddy, Jerry Bresler	3:16

== Personnel ==
- Robert Morgan - producer
- Stan Applebaum - arranger, conductor
- Ray Ellis - arranger, conductor
- Hugo Winterhalter - arranger, conductor

== Charts ==
Album – Billboard (North America)

Year	Chart	Position
1964	The Billboard 200	13

Singles – Billboard (North America)

Year	Single	Chart	Position
1964	"The Bell That Couldn't Jingle"	The Billboard Hot 100	23
1964	"Dearest Santa"	The Billboard Hot 100	8
