= Live at the Copa =

Live at the Copa may refer to:

- Live at the Copa (Bobby Vinton album), 1966
- Live at the Copa (The Temptations album), 1968
