= 100 Memories =

Studio album by Bobby Vinton
- Released: 1979
- Genre: Pop
- Label: Ahed
- Producer: Bob Morgan

Bobby Vinton chronology
Summer Serenades (1979)	100 Memories (1979)	The Million Selling Records of Bobby Vinton (1979)

100 Memories is the thirty-first studio album of Bobby Vinton, released in 1979 by the Canadian label Ahed. This album is a cover album of 100 songs from the 1950s to 1970s and contains two LPs. While the album contains 100 songs, they are all recorded as medleys: 1 - 4, 5 - 9, 10 - 14, 15 - 19, 20 - 24, 25 - 28, 29 - 33, 34 - 38, 39 - 42, 43 - 47, 48 - 51, 52 - 56, 57 - 61, 62 - 66, 67 - 71, 72 - 75, 76 - 80, 81 - 85, 86 - 90, 91 - 95, and 96 through 100.

== Track listing ==
=== Disc 1 ===
1. Moments to Remember / Love Letters in the Sand / Where or When / See You in September (Robert Allen, Al Stillman / J. Fred Coots, Nick Kenny, Charles Kenny / Richard Rodgers, Lorenz Hart / Sid Wayne, Sherman Edwards)
2. Blueberry Hill / Only You (And You Alone) / Young Love / (They Long to Be) Close to You / I Love You Because (Vincent Rose, Larry Stock, Al Lewis / Buck Ram / Ric Cartey, Carole Joyner / Burt Bacharach, Hal David / Joshua Salzman, Ryan Cunninghan)
3. Just the Way You Are / Save the Last Dance For Me / Never My Love / The Most Beautiful Girl / I Can See Clearly Now (Billy Joel / Doc Pomus, Mort Shuman / Donald Adrissi, Richard Adrissi / Bill Sherrill, Norris Wilson, Rory Bourke / Johnny Nash)
4. A Taste of Honey / You're Sixteen / Bad, Bad Leroy Brown / Happy Together / Sweet Caroline (Bobby Scott, Ric Marlow / Richard M. Sherman, Robert B. Sherman / Jim Croce / Gary Boner, Alan Gordon / Neil Diamond)
5. Love Me Tender / You Send Me / Sincerely / Love Is a Many-Splendored Thing / Everybody Loves Somebody (Vera Matson, Elvis Presley / Sam Cooke / Harvey Fuqua, Alan Freed / Paul Francis Webster, Sammy Fain / Ken Lane, Sam Coslow, Irving Taylor)
6. Tie a Yellow Ribbon Round the Ole Oak Tree / Oh, Babe, What Would You Say? / All My Loving / You Are the Sunshine of My Life (L. Russell Brown, Irwin Levine / Elieen Sylvia Smith / John Lennon, Paul McCartney / Stevie Wonder)
7. Red Roses for a Blue Lady / Have I Told You Lately That I Love You / Paper Roses / A White Sport Coat (And a Pink Carnation) / Anytime (Roy C. Bennett, Sid Tepper / Scotty Wiseman / Fred Spielman, Janice Torre / Marty Robbins / Herbert "Happy" Lawson)
8. It's All in the Game / Twilight Time / To Each His Own / When I Fall in Love / I'll Be Seeing You (Charles Dawes, Carl Sigman / Buck Ram / Jay Livingston, Ray Evans / Edward Heyman, Victor Young / Sammy Fain, Irving Kahal)
9. Love Story / Killing Me Softly With Her Song / I Left My Heart in San Francisco / The Way We Were (Francis Lai, Carl Sigman / Charles Fox, Norman Gimbel / George Cory, Douglass Cross / Alan and Marilyn Bergman, Marvin Hamlisch)
10. Can't Take My Eyes off of You / The Look of Love / Sunny / Love Will Keep Us Together / Will You Love Me Tomorrow (Bob Gaudio, Bob Crewe / Burt Bacharach, Hal David / Bobby Hebb / Neil Sedaka, Howard Greenfield / Gerry Goffin, Carole King)
11. Are You Lonesome Tonight / You Light Up My Life / Three Times a Lady / Always (Lou Handman, Roy Turk / Joseph Brooks / Lionel Richie / Irving Berlin)

=== Disc 2 ===
1. Chances Are / Nevertheless (I'm in Love with You) / You Belong to Me / Mona Lisa / Hey Jude (Robert Allen, Al Stillman / Bert Kalmar, Harry Ruby / Pee Wee King, Redd Stewart, Chilton Price / Jay Livingston, Ray Evans / John Lennon, Paul McCartney)
2. Song Sung Blue / Tiny Bubbles / Everything Is Beautiful / Raindrops Keep Fallin' On My Head / Ramblin' Rose (Neil Diamond / Martin Denny, Leon Poeller / Ray Stevens / Burt Bacharach, Hal David / Joel Sherman, Noel Sherman)
3. King of the Road / Take Me Home, Country Roads / Top of the World / I'm Henry VIII, I Am / Let Me Be There (Roger Miller / Bill Danoff, Taffy Nivert, John Denver / John Bettis, Richard Carpenter / R. P. Weston, Fred Murray / John Rostill)
4. Breaking Up Is Hard to Do / Yesterday / Since I Fell for You / Born to Lose / How Can You Mend a Broken Heart (Neil Sedaka, Howard Greenfield / John Lennon / Paul McCartney / Buddy Johnson / Unknown / Barry Gibb, Maurice Gibb)
5. Too Young / Unchained Melody / Cry / Can't Help Falling in Love (Sylvia Dee, Sidney Lippman / Alex North, Hy Zaret / Churchill Kohlman / Hugo Peretti, Luigi Creatore George David Weiss)
6. Volare (Nel Blu Di Pinto Di Blu) / Singing the Blues / Standing on the Corner / I Want to Hold Your Hand / Hello, Dolly! (Domenico Modugno, Franco Migliacci, Mitchell Parish / Melvin Endsley / Frank Loesser / John Lennon, Paul McCartney / Jerry Herman)
7. Sing / Blowin' in the Wind / Those Lazy-Hazy-Crazy Days of Summer / Oh, Lonesome Me / Those Were the Days (Joe Raposo / Bob Dylan / Hans Carste, Charles Tobias / Don Gibson / Boris Fomin, Gene Raskin)
8. More (Theme from Mondo Cane) / Our Day Will Come / Spanish Eyes / Goin' out of My Head / I Will Wait for You (Nino Oliviero, Riz Ortolani / Bob Hilliard, Mort Garson / Bert Kaempfert, Charles Singleton, Eddie Snyder / Teddy Randazzo / Jacques Demy, Michel Legrand)
9. Strangers in the Night / For the Good Times / How Deep Is Your Love / Bridge over Troubled Water / I Can't Stop Loving You (Bert Kaempfert, Charles Singleton, Eddie Snyder / Kris Kristofferson / Barry Gibb, Maurice Gibb / Paul Simon / Don Gibson)
10. Something / Let It Be Me / I Only Have Eyes For You / I Don't Know Why (I Just Do) / I'll Get By (As Long As I Have You) (George Harrison / Gilbert Bécaud, Pierre Delanoë / Harry Warren, Al Dubin / Fred E. Ahlert, Roy Turk / Fred E. Ahlert, Roy Turk)

== Album credits ==
- Produced by Bob Morgan
- Manufactured by Precision Records, Toronto, Ontario
