= Tell Me Why (Bobby Vinton album) =

Studio album by Bobby Vinton
- Released: July 1964
- Genre: Pop
- Label: Epic
- Producer: Robert Morgan

Bobby Vinton chronology
There! I've Said It Again (1964)	Tell Me Why (1964)	Bobby Vinton's Greatest Hits (1964)

Professional ratings
Review scores
Source	Rating
Record Mirror	4/5 stars

Tell Me Why is Bobby Vinton's eighth studio album, released in July 1964. The title track is the album's only single. Cover versions include "Somewhere Along the Way", "When I Lost You", "Some of These Days", "Maybe You'll Be There", "If You Love Me (Really Love Me)" and "I Wanna Be Loved".

== Track listing ==
Side 1
No.	Title	Writer(s)	Length
1.	"Somewhere Along the Way"	Sammy Gallop, Kurt Adams	2:22
2.	"When I Lost You"	Irving Berlin	2:14
3.	"There Goes My Heart"	Benny Davis, Abner Silver	2:59
4.	"Some of These Days"	Shelton Brooks	3:20
5.	"Maybe You'll Be There"	Sammy Gallop, Rube Bloom	2:27
6.	"Tell Me Why"	Al Alberts, Marty Gold	2:36

Side 2
No.	Title	Writer(s)	Length
1.	"Imagination Is a Magic Dream"	Bob Hilliard, B.T. Green	3:10
2.	"If You Love Me, Really Love Me"	Geoff Parsons, Marguerite Monnot	3:25
3.	"There Goes That Song Again"	Sammy Cahn, Jule Styne	2:07
4.	"A Pretty Girl Is Like a Melody"	Irving Berlin	2:36
5.	"I Love You Much Too Much"	Don Raye, Alexander Olshey, Chaim Towber	2:54
6.	"I Wanna Be Loved"	Billy Rose, Edward Heyman, Johnny Green	2:30

== Personnel ==
- Robert Morgan - producer
- Stan Applebaum - arranger, conductor

== Charts ==
Chart (1964)	Peak position
US Billboard Top LPs	31

Singles - Billboard (United States)

Year	Single	Chart	Position
1964	"Tell Me Why"	Billboard Hot 100	13
1964	"Tell Me Why"	Easy Listening	3
