= The Brook Brothers =

UK pop duo

- Origin: Winchester, England
- Genres: Pop, skiffle
- Years active: 1956–1963
- Past members: Geoff Brook; Ricky Brook

The Brook Brothers were an English rock and roll duo composed of Geoff Brook (born Geoffrey Owen Brooks, 12 April 1943, Southampton) and Ricky Brook (born Richard Alan Brooks, 24 October 1940, Southampton).

== History ==
The brothers, Geoff and Richard, were born in Southampton, and later moved to Winchester.

The Brook Brothers started out as a skiffle group in 1956 but, after winning a television talent show, changed their look and sound to approximate the style of The Everly Brothers. At some point in their career, they dropped the 's' from their surname 'Brooks' and became 'Brook'.

They signed to Top Rank Records in 1960 and released a cover of the song "Greenfields" by The Brothers Four the same year. The tune was a hit in Italy, but attracted little notice in their home country. After a few more singles were released, they switched to Pye Records, and their second release for them, "Warpaint" (written by Howard Greenfield and Barry Mann), became a UK Top 10 hit.

Following the single's success they released a full-length album and toured with Cliff Richard and Bobby Rydell. They took part in the annual NME Readers' Poll-Winners Concert at London's Wembley Pool on 15 April 1962. They were produced by a young Tony Hatch, and made an appearance in the film, It's Trad, Dad!. They also entered A Song For Europe for the Eurovision Song Contest 1962, but did not advance in the contest.

Their last chart hit was in 1963 with the song "Trouble is My Middle Name", which featured Jimmy Page on guitar. After this song, the group's popularity faded, and they left public view by 1965. After their singing careers ended, Ricky worked for Mullard.

Their entire Pye output was reissued on CD by Castle Music in the 1990s.

== Discography ==
=== Singles ===
Year	Label	A-side	B-side	Chart positions
Year	Label	A-side	B-side	UK
1960	Top Rank	"Greenfields"	"How Will It End"	
1960	Top Rank	"Please Help Me I'm Falling"	"When Will I Be Loved?"	
1960	Pye	"Say The Word"	"Everything But Love"	
1961	Pye	"Married"	"I Love Girls"	
1961	Pye	"One Last Kiss"	"Ain't Gonna Wash for a Week"	
1961	Pye	"Hello Mary Lou"		
1961	Pye	"Little Devil"		
1961	Pye	"(I Wanna) Love My Life Away"		
1961	Pye	"Warpaint"	"Sometimes"	5
1961	Disques Vogue	"I'm in Love Again"	"Like Making Love"	
1961	Pye	"Little Bitty Heart"	"Tell Her"	
1961	Pye	"Ain't Gonna Wash for a Week"	"One Last Kiss"	13
1962	Pye	"He's Old Enough to Know Better"	"Win Or Lose"	37
1962	Pye	"Welcome Home, Baby"	"So Long"	33
1962	Pye	"Town Girl"	"I Can't Make Up My Mind"	
1962	Pye	"Just Another Fool"	"Double Trouble"	
1962	Pye	"The Trolley Song"		
1962	Pye	"Look for a Star"		
1962	Pye	"Half as Much"		
1962	Pye	"Tell Tale"	"Too Scared"	
1962	Pye	"He's Old Enough To Know Better"	"Win or Lose"	
1962	Pye	"So Long"		
1963	Pye	"I'm Not Jimmy"	"Side by Side"	
1963	Pye	"Whistle to the Wind"	"Crosswords"	
1963	Pye	"Trouble Is My Middle Name"	"Let the Good Times Roll"	38

=== Extended plays ===
Year	Label	Title	Track listing
1961	Pye	Brook Brothers Hit Parade	1. "Say The Word"; 2. "Everything But Love"; 3. "Warpaint"; 4. "Sometimes"
1961	Pye	Brook Brothers Hit Parade Vol.2	1. "Little Bitty Heart"; 2. "One Last Kiss"; 3. "Tell Her"; 4. "Ain't Gonna Wash For A Week"
1962	Pye	Brook Brothers	1. "The Trolley Song"; 2. "Look for a Star"; 3. "Half as Much"; 4. "I Wanna Love My Life Away"
