= On the Way to Cape May =

Song by Maurice "Buddy" Nugent

"On the Way to Cape May" is a song by Maurice "Buddy" Nugent. It is a Jersey Shore sound summertime anthem for the Philadelphia metropolitan area and South Jersey.

== History ==
The song circulated from one band to another around Cape May County in the second half of the 20th century. Early versions were sung by singers like Daddy Beans and Don Cornell. Cozy Morley popularized it among his large local following. Al Alberts recorded it and increased its broadcast exposure on local radio and TV.

The song has been played through a variety of 21st-century radios, including XM, Internet and Philadelphia metropolitan area AM and FM.

== Lyrics ==
The lyrics are about a love story and journey which begins with the intro mentioning Ocean City. Traveling southward, they mention of Sea Isle City, Avalon, Stone Harbor, and Wildwood leading to talks of marriage around the town of Cape May Court House. While Cape May is the destination in the lyrics, the song's theme is more about the journey through Cape May County.

== In popular culture ==
Comedian Cozy Morley, who owned Club Avalon, a nightclub in North Wildwood from 1958–89 and where a life-size statue of him now stands in front of the site of the club (which was demolished in 1989 and is now Inlet on Olde after the sale of Westy's Irish Pub in 2017,), made "On the Way to Cape May" his signature song and performed it many times during his acts in the Philadelphia and South Jersey areas. Morley lived in Haddon Township, New Jersey and retired to North Wildwood. He and his wife Bobbie also owned a home in Fort Lauderdale, Florida.
