= Melodies of Love =

Studio album by Bobby Vinton
- Released: November 1974
- Studio: Sound Lab, A&M, John Wagner, Sunwest
- Genre: Pop
- Label: ABC
- Producer: Bob Morgan

Bobby Vinton chronology
The Many Moods of Bobby Vinton: Bobby Vinton...in Love (1974)	Melodies of Love (1974)	With Love (1974)

Professional ratings
Review scores
Source	Rating
Allmusic	3/5 stars
Music Week	1/4 stars

Melodies of Love is Bobby Vinton's twenty-fourth studio album and his first studio album for ABC Records. It was released in 1974.

The album was released in response to popular demand, following Vinton's million-selling single "My Melody of Love", his first single in two years, which proved a successful comeback and earned Vinton the nickname "the Polish Prince". After the song became a #3 hit on the Billboard Hot 100 and a #1 adult contemporary hit, the semi-eponymous album was released, reaching #16 on the Billboard Hot 200 list of popular albums and going gold.

"My Melody of Love" is the first track on the album and is the album's highest charting single. Cover versions include Olivia Newton-John's hit "I Honestly Love You", Alice Faye's "You'll Never Know" and Al Martino's "Here in My Heart". The fifth track, "Am I Losing You", is a reworking of the Italian song "Io ti darò di più" with a few English lyrics replacing some of the Italian lyrics.

== Track listing ==
1. "My Melody of Love" (Bobby Vinton, Henry Mayer) - 3:08
2. "I Honestly Love You" (Peter Allen, Jeff Barry) - 3:25
3. "You'll Never Know" (Mack Gordon, Harry Warren) - 2:40
4. "Dick and Jane" (Dewayne Blackwell) - 3:15
5. "Never Ending Song of Love" (Delaney Bramlett) - 2:57
6. "Am I Losing You" (Bobby Vinton, Alberto Testa, Memo Remigi) - 3:00
7. "The Most Beautiful Girl" (Norro Wilson, Billy Sherrill, Rory Michael Bourke) - 2:27
8. "My Gypsy Love" (Bobby Vinton) - 3:12
9. "I'll Be Loving You" (Bobby Vinton, Gene Allan) - 2:46
10. "Here in My Heart" (Pat Genaro, Lou Levinson, Bill Borrelli) - 2:43
11. "I Want to Spend My Life With You" (Larry Weiss, John Williams) - 3:07

== Personnel ==
- Al Capps - arranger
- Mike Melvoin - arranger
- Joe Reisman - arranger
- Ernie Freeman - arranger
- Jim "Dallas" Crouch - drums, vocals
- Armin Steiner - engineer
- Tommy Vicari - engineer
- Michael Lietz - engineer
- Ray Gerhart - engineer
- John Wagner - engineer
- Barry Keene - engineer
- Tim Bryant - album design
- Mia Beard - photography

== Charts ==
Album - Billboard (North America)

Year	Chart	Position
1974	The Billboard 200	16 This album was re-released through Pickwick Records as SPC 3553 Melodies of love

Singles - Billboard (North America)

Year	Single	Chart	Position
1974	"My Melody of Love"	The Billboard Hot 100	3
1975	"Dick and Jane"	The Billboard Hot 100	33
1974	"My Melody of Love"	Adult Contemporary	1
