= Sealed with a Kiss (Bobby Vinton album) =

Sealed With a Kiss

Studio album by Bobby Vinton
- Released: July 1972
- Genre: Pop
- Label: Epic
- Producer: Bobby Vinton

Bobby Vinton chronology
Ev'ry Day of My Life (1972)	Sealed With a Kiss (1972)	Bobby Vinton's All-Time Greatest Hits (1972)

Professional ratings
Review scores
Source	Rating
Allmusic	4/5 stars

Sealed With a Kiss was Bobby Vinton's twenty-third studio album for Epic Records. It was released in 1972 just before Epic released Vinton from his contract with them. The title track (a cover of Brian Hyland's 1962 hit) is the album's only single. Other covers include "The First Time Ever I Saw Your Face", "Speak Softly Love", "Some Kind of Wonderful", "Come Softly to Me", "Song Sung Blue", "The End of the World" and "Our Day Will Come".

== Track listing ==
No.	Title	Writer(s)	Length
1.	"Sealed With a Kiss"	Gary Geld, Peter Udell	2:48
2.	"The First Time Ever I Saw Your Face"	Ewan MacColl	2:28
3.	"Love Theme from "The Godfather" (Speak Softly Love)" (From the Paramount Picture "The Godfather")	Lawrence Kusik, Nino Rota	2:55
4.	"Some Kind of Wonderful"	Gerry Goffin, Carole King	2:46
5.	"Somebody's Breakin' My Heart"	T. Harris	2:51
6.	"Come Softly to Me"	Gary Troxel, Gretchen Christopher, Barbara Ellis	2:27
7.	"Song Sung Blue"	Neil Diamond	2:50
8.	"The End of the World"	Arthur Kent, Sylvia Dee	2:55
9.	"Greenfields"	Terry Gilkyson, Richard Dehr, Frank Miller	3:05
10.	"Our Day Will Come"	Bob Hilliard, Mort Garson	2:57
11.	"I'm Leaving It Up to You"	Dewey Terry, Don Harris	2:26

== Personnel ==
- Produced by Bobby Vinton
- Production coordinator: John Walsh
- Arranged and conducted by Al Capps
- Engineering: Phil Macy
- Special thanks to Pete Bennett
- Cover photos: David Sutton

== Charts ==
Chart (1972)	Peak position
Australia (Kent Music Report)	57
US Top LPs (Billboard)	77
