= The Greatest Hits of the Golden Groups =

Studio album by Bobby Vinton
- Released: 1963
- Genres: Pop, country pop
- Length: 31:38
- Label: Epic
- Producer: Robert Morgan

Bobby Vinton chronology
Bobby Vinton Sings the Big Ones (1962)	The Greatest Hits of the Golden Groups (1963)	Blue on Blue (1963)

The Greatest Hits of the Golden Groups: Bobby Vinton Sings the Goodies! is Bobby Vinton's fifth studio album, released in 1963. This album contains cover songs that were hits during the 1950s for the following artists: the Rays, the Penguins, the Platters, the Five Satins, Bobby Helms, Little Anthony and the Imperials, the Moonglows, Lee Andrews & the Hearts, the Heartbeats and Jesse Belvin. All of the tracks on this album were recorded in Nashville. "Over the Mountain (Across the Sea)" (previously a hit for the duo Johnnie & Joe) is the album's only single. All of the songs on this album were later included in the collection Bobby Vinton Sings the Golden Decade of Love.

== Critical reception ==
Professional ratings
Review scores
Source	Rating
The Virgin Encyclopedia of Popular Music	2/5 stars

Music Vendor said that "Bobby ticks off golden hits of a few short years ago, in a style that will make for counter-jingle." They called the album "solid". Retrospectively, The Virgin Encyclopedia of Popular Music gave the album a two-star rating, which meant that the album was "flawed" and "dull".

== Liner notes ==
On the back of the album cover, there is an error in the credits for who wrote the song "Goodnight My Love." The version of the song that is featured on this album was actually written by George Motola and John Marascalco but credits Mack Gordon and Harry Revel as songwriters. Gordon and Revel wrote a song with exactly the same title that was released in 1936.

== Track listing ==
Side 1
No.	Title	Writer(s)	Length
1.	"Over the Mountain (Across the Sea)"	Rex Garvin	2:26
2.	"Silhouettes"	Frank Slay, Jr., Bob Crewe	2:56
3.	"Earth Angel (Will You Be Mine)"	Curtis Williams, Gaynel Hodge, Jesse Belvin	2:09
4.	"Only You (And You Alone)"	Buck Ram, Ande Rand	2:24
5.	"I'll Remember (In the Still of the Nite)"	Fred Parris	2:57
6.	"My Special Angel"	Jimmy Duncan	3:02

Side 2
No.	Title	Writer(s)	Length
1.	"The Great Pretender"	Buck Ram	2:50
2.	"Tears on My Pillow"	Sylvester Bradford, Al Lewis	2:14
3.	"Sincerely"	Alan Freed, Harvey Fuqua	3:04
4.	"Teardrops"	Roy Calhoun, Barry Goldor, Edwin Charles, Helen Stanley	2:15
5.	"A Thousand Miles Away"	James Sheppard, William Miller	2:14
6.	"Goodnight My Love"	George Motola, John Marascalco	2:19

== Album credits ==
- Produced by Robert Morgan
- Cover photo: Columbia Records Photo Studio - Henry Parker

== Singles ==
Single	Year	Chart	Peak position
"Over the Mountain (Across the Sea)"	1963	US Billboard Hot 100	21
"Over the Mountain (Across the Sea)"	1963	US Easy Listening	8
"Over the Mountain (Across the Sea)"	1963	Canada CHUM Top Singles	2
