= Trouble Is My Middle Name =

Single by Bobby Vinton
- A-side: "Let's Kiss and Make Up"
- Released: 1962
- Genre: Pop music
- Length: 2:28
- Label: Epic Records
- Songwriters: Neval Nader & John Gluck, Jr.
- Producer: Bob Morgan

"Trouble Is My Middle Name" is a song written by Neval Nader and John Gluck Jr, and released by Bobby Vinton in 1962. It spent nine weeks on the Billboard Hot 100 chart, peaking at No. 33, while reaching No. 27 on the United Kingdom's New Musical Express chart, and No. 7 on Billboard's Middle-Road Singles chart.

A cover version was released by The Brook Brothers in 1963, which reached No. 38 on the UK Singles Chart, while a version released in 1966 by The Four Pennies reached No. 32 on the UK Singles Chart.

== Charts ==
Chart (1962–63)	Peak position
U.S. Billboard Hot 100	33
