= My Melody of Love =

Single by Bobby Vinton

from the album Melodies of Love
- B-side: "I'll Be Loving You"
- Released: September 9, 1974
- Length: 3:08
- Label: ABC Records
- Songwriters: Henry Mayer, Bobby Vinton
- Producer: Bob Morgan

Bobby Vinton singles chronology
| "Hurt" (1973) | "My Melody of Love" (1974) | "Beer Barrel Polka" (1975) |

"My Melody of Love" is the title of a popular song from 1974 (see 1974 in music) by the American singer Bobby Vinton. Vinton adapted his song from a German schlager song composed by Henry Mayer, and it appears on Vinton's album Melodies of Love. The song was also recorded by Spanish pop singer Karina as "Palabras de Cristal".

Vinton came up with the idea to adapt Mayer's song while performing in Las Vegas, Nevada. The original song was called "Herzen haben keine Fenster" ("Hearts have no windows") and was a hit in Germany and Austria as performed by Austrian singer Elfi Graf. A version with newly written English lyrics, released as a single called "Don't Stay Away Too Long" by the British duo Peters and Lee earlier in 1974, failed to chart in the US but reached number three on the UK Singles Chart. Vinton's lyrics use a refrain that switches between English and Polish:

Moja droga, ja cię kocham,
Means that I love you so.
Moja droga, ja cię kocham,
More than you'll ever know.
Kocham ciebie całym sercem,
Love you with all my heart.

"My Melody of Love" was Vinton's highest charting US pop hit since "Mr. Lonely" reached number one on the Billboard Hot 100 chart in 1964, nearly ten years before. The RIAA-certified gold single spent two weeks at number three on the Hot 100 chart in November 1974 and one week at number one on the Billboard easy listening chart, the singer's fourth song to top this chart. Its success led to Vinton's nickname "the Polish Prince". The song also became the theme-song of The Bobby Vinton Show, Vinton's variety show which ran in Canada on the CTV Network from 1975 to 1978. The song was also performed numerous times on the Lawrence Welk Show during the mid- to late-1970s.

== Charts ==
=== Weekly charts ===
| Chart (1974–75) | Peak position |
|---|---|
| Australia (Kent Music Report) | 17 |
| Belgium | 18 |
| Canada RPM Top Singles | 1 |
| Canada RPM Adult Contemporary | 2 |
| U.S. Billboard Hot 100 | 3 |
| U.S. Billboard Adult Contemporary | 1 |
| U.S. Cash Box Top 100 | 2 |

=== Year-end charts ===
| Chart (1974) | Rank |
|---|---|
| Canada RPM Top Singles | 10 |
| U.S. (Joel Whitburn's Pop Annual) | 45 |

== See also ==
- List of number-one adult contemporary singles of 1974 (U.S.)

== Covers ==
- Mireille Mathieu covered the song as "Ma melodie d'amour" in France.(1975)
- The Polish version of this song, "Moja droga ja cię kocham" ("My dear, I love you"), was performed by the famous singer Zbigniew Wodecki.
- In the Russian version, this song entitled "Улыбнитесь, люди, миру" ("Smile, people, the world") entered the repertoire of the famous singer Edita Piekha (1982, author of the Russian text Ilya Reznik).
