= Bobby Vinton Sings the Newest Hits =

Studio album by Bobby Vinton
- Released: 1967
- Genre: Pop
- Label: Epic
- Producer: Robert Mersey

Bobby Vinton chronology
Live at the Copa (1966)	Bobby Vinton Sings the Newest Hits (1967)	Please Love Me Forever (1967)

Bobby Vinton Sings the Newest Hits is Bobby Vinton's fifteenth studio album, released in 1967.

Primarily a cover album, this album contains various songs from past years, especially movie themes. Cover songs include "Call Me" (a British hit for Petula Clark in 1964 and U.S. hit for Chris Montez in 1965) and "The End of the World" (a hit for Skeeter Davis in 1963). Movie themes include "Born Free", "The Shadow of Your Smile", "This Is My Song", "Georgy Girl" and "All". Two singles came from this album: "Coming Home Soldier" (co-written by Vinton); the song, a sequel of sorts to Vinton's earlier hit "Mr. Lonely", reached #11 on the Billboard Hot 100 chart. The follow-up, "For He's A Jolly Good Fellow", originally written and recorded by Ray Stevens, charted at #66.

== Track listing ==
Side 1
No.	Title	Writer(s)	Length
1.	"Born Free" ([From the Columbia Picture Born Free])	Don Black, John Barry	2:48
2.	"The Shadow of Your Smile (Love Theme from The Sandpiper)" ([From the M-G-M and Filmways Production The Sandpiper])	Paul Francis Webster, Johnny Mandel	2:42
3.	"This Is My Song" ([From the Universal Picture A Countess from Hong Kong])	Charles Chaplin	2:10
4.	"Call Me"	Tony Hatch	2:18
5.	"For He's a Jolly Good Fellow"	Ray Stevens	2:39

Side 2
No.	Title	Writer(s)	Length
1.	"Georgy Girl" ([From the Motion Picture Georgy Girl])	Jim Dale, Tom Springfield	2:11
2.	"The End of the World"	Sylvia Dee, Arthur Kent	2:55
3.	"Sunrise, Sunset" ([From the Musical Production Fiddler on the Roof])	Sheldon Harnick, Jerry Bock	2:24
4.	"All" ([Theme from the Motion Picture Run for Your Wife])	Ray Jessel, Marian Grudeff, Nino Oliviero	2:25
5.	"Coming Home Soldier"	Gene Allan, Bobby Vinton	2:29

== Personnel ==
- Bobby Vinton - vocals
- Robert Mersey - producer, arranger, conductor

== Charts ==
Singles - Billboard (North America)

Year	Single	Chart	Position
1967	"Coming Home Soldier"	The Billboard Hot 100	11
1967	"For He's A Jolly Good Fellow"	The Billboard Hot 100	66
