= My Elusive Dreams (Bobby Vinton album) =

Studio album by Bobby Vinton
- Released: March 1970
- Genre: Pop
- Label: Epic
- Producer: Billy Sherrill

Bobby Vinton chronology
Bobby Vinton's Greatest Hits of Love (1969)	My Elusive Dreams (1970)	Sounds of Love (1970)

Professional ratings
Review scores
Source	Rating
Allmusic	3/5 stars

My Elusive Dreams was Bobby Vinton's twentieth studio album, released in 1970.

The title track, a remake of a 1967 Tammy Wynette/David Houston hit, is the album's only single. Cover versions include B.J. Thomas' hit "Raindrops Keep Fallin' on My Head", the Beatles' hit "Something", "Leaving on a Jet Plane", "I'll Never Fall in Love Again", "I Will Follow You" (a different version of Little Peggy March's hit "I Will Follow Him"), and Barbara Lewis' hit "Baby I'm Yours".

== Track listing ==
Side 1
No.	Title	Writer(s)	Length
1.	"My Elusive Dreams"	Curly Putman, Billy Sherrill	3:13
2.	"Raindrops Keep Fallin' on My Head" (From the 20th Century Fox Picture Butch Cassidy and the Sundance Kid)	Hal David, Burt Bacharach	2:46
3.	"Something"	George Harrison	2:50
4.	"I'll Never Fall in Love Again" (From the Musical Production Promises, Promises)	Burt Bacharach, Hal David	2:45
5.	"Leaving on a Jet Plane"	John Denver	3:29

Side 2
No.	Title	Writer(s)	Length
1.	"Traces"	Buddy Buie, James Cobb, Emory Gordy Jr.	3:01
2.	"I Will Follow You"	Arthur Altman, Norman Gimbel, Franck Pourcel, Paul Mauriat	2:07
3.	"Baby Take Me in Your Arms"	Tony Macaulay, John Macleod	2:25
4.	"If Ever I Would Leave You"	Alan Jay Lerner, Frederick Loewe	2:45
5.	"Baby I'm Yours"	Van McCoy	2:24
6.	"The Perfect Woman"	Buddy Kaye, Philip Springer	3:14

== Personnel ==
- Bobby Vinton – vocals
- Billy Sherrill – producer
- Hank Levine – arranger ("Raindrops Keep Fallin' on My Head", "Something", "I'll Never Fall in Love Again", "Leaving on a Jet Plane", "Traces", "Baby Take Me in Your Arms" and "If Ever I Would Leave You")
- Bill Walker – arranger ("My Elusive Dreams", "Baby I'm Yours" and "The Perfect Woman")
- Lou Bradley – engineer
- Charlie Brigg – engineer
- Tom Sparkman – engineer
- Suzanne Szasz – back cover photo

== Charts ==
Album – Billboard (North America)

Year	Chart	Position
1970	The Billboard 200	90

Singles – Billboard (North America)

Year	Single	Chart	Position
1970	"My Elusive Dreams"	The Billboard Hot 100	46
1970	"My Elusive Dreams"	Billboard Adult Contemporary	7
1970	"My Elusive Dreams"	Country Singles	27
