= Bobby Vinton Sings the Big Ones =

Studio album by Bobby Vinton
- Released: December 1962
- Genre: Pop
- Length: 32:27
- Label: Epic
- Producer: Robert Morgan

Bobby Vinton chronology
| Roses Are Red (1962) | Bobby Vinton Sings the Big Ones (1962) | The Greatest Hits of the Golden Groups (1963) |

Singles from Bobby Vinton Sings the Big Ones
- 1. "Rain Rain Go Away" Released: 1962; 2. "I Love You the Way You Are" Released: 1962

Professional ratings
Review scores
| Source | Rating |
|---|---|
| New Record Mirror | 3/5 stars |

Bobby Vinton Sings the Big Ones is the fourth studio album by Bobby Vinton, released in 1962. There were two singles from this album: "Rain Rain Go Away" and "I Love You the Way You Are" (the latter written completely by Vinton). Cover versions include "I'm Gettin' Sentimental Over You", "Ramblin' Rose", "The Twelfth of Never", "Because of You", "Be My Love", "My Heart Cries for You", "I Remember You", "He'll Have to Go" and "Autumn Leaves".

The song "I Love You the Way You Are" was originally recorded in the late 50s as a demo and left unreleased. After Vinton had a hit with "Roses are Red (My Love)", Diamond Records purchased the demo and issued it as a single, reaching #38. They didn't even have another Vinton song to use as the B-side, so they put a song by Chuck and Johnny as the flip. Diamond refused to lease the single to Epic for the LP, so Epic had Vinton rerecord the song. The original hit version has never been issued on LP.

== Track listing ==
Side 1
| No. | Title | Writer(s) | Length |
|---|---|---|---|
| 1. | "Rain Rain Go Away" | Gloria Shayne, Noël Regney | 2:59 |
| 2. | "I'm Gettin' Sentimental Over You" | Ned Washington, George Bassman | 2:51 |
| 3. | "Ramblin' Rose" | Joe Sherman, Noel Sherman | 2:37 |
| 4. | "The Twelfth of Never" | Paul Francis Webster, Jerry Livingston | 2:11 |
| 5. | "I Love You the Way You Are" | Bobby Vinton | 2:57 |
| 6. | "Because of You" | Arthur Hammerstein, Dudley Wilkinson | 2:17 |

Side 2
| No. | Title | Writer(s) | Length |
|---|---|---|---|
| 1. | "Be My Love" | Sammy Cahn, Nicholas Brodszky | 2:34 |
| 2. | "My Heart Cries for You" | Carl Sigman, Percy Faith | 2:33 |
| 3. | "I Remember You" | Johnny Mercer, Victor Schertzinger | 3:16 |
| 4. | "You Were Only Fooling" | William Faber, Fred Meadows, Larry Fotine | 2:52 |
| 5. | "He'll Have to Go" | Audrey Allison, Joe Allison | 2:38 |
| 6. | "Autumn Leaves" | Johnny Mercer, Joseph Kosma | 2:42 |

== Personnel ==
- Robert Morgan - producer
- Robert Mersey - arranger, conductor

== Charts ==
Album - Billboard (North America)

| Year | Chart | Position |
|---|---|---|
| 1962 | The Billboard 200 | 137 |

Singles - Billboard (North America)

| Year | Single | Chart | Position |
|---|---|---|---|
| 1962 | "Rain Rain Go Away" | The Billboard Hot 100 | 12 |
| 1962 | "Rain Rain Go Away" | Billboard Adult Contemporary | 4 |
| 1962 | "I Love You the Way You Are" | The Billboard Hot 100 | 38 |
