= Lee Andrews =

English footballer (born 1984)

Personal information
- Full name: Lee David Andrews
- Date of birth: 23 April 1984 (age 42)
- Place of birth: Carlisle, England
- Height: 6 ft 0 in (1.83 m)
- Position: Defender

Team information
- Current team: Workington AFC (Player Manger)

Youth career
- ?–2001: Carlisle United

Senior career*
Years	Team	Apps	(Gls)
2001–2006	Carlisle United	106	(0)
2003	→ Rochdale (loan)	8	(0)
2005	→ York City (loan)	9	(0)
2006	→ Torquay United (loan)	7	(0)
2006–2007	Torquay United	46	(0)
2007–2008	Newcastle Blue Star	24	(0)
2008–2015	Workington	214	(13)
2026-	Workington	1	(0)
Total		415	(13)

Managerial career
- 2016–2018: Workington (joint-manager)
- 2019: Workington
- * Club domestic league appearances and goals

Lee Andrews (born 23 April 1984) is an English current footballer and assistant manager who plays as a defender.

== Playing career ==
Andrews began his career as a trainee with his local side Carlisle United, turning professional in August 2001 and making his league debut later month in a 2–0 defeat at home to Luton Town. He had spell as a regular in the Carlisle side at right-back, before losing his place. He joined Rochdale on loan in February 2003, before returning to Carlisle and regaining his place in the first team, signing a new two-year contract in May 2004. After playing in a Carlisle side relegated to and promoted from the Football Conference, Andrews joined York City on loan in November 2005 and as Carlisle successfully battled for a second successive promotion, moved to Torquay United, struggling at the opposite end of the table on loan in March 2006.

He was released by Carlisle at the end of the 2005–06 season, and returned to Plainmoor on a permanent basis in June 2006 as one of Ian Atkins' first signings after taking over as manager. Atkins had been manager of Carlisle while Andrews was a trainee there. He was an ever-present for Torquay in the 2006–07 season, which ended with Torquay's relegation to the Conference National. Although offered a new contract with Torquay at the end of the season, he chose to return to the North of England.

In September 2007 he signed for Newcastle Blue Star, moving to Workington in April 2008. He would end his playing career in the summer of 2015 after playing over 200 times for Workington.

== Managerial career ==
After his retirement as a player, Andrews joined the coaching staff at Workington A.F.C. in June 2015, where he became an assistant coach to Derek Townsley. From June 2016 until December 2018, Andrews was joint-manager at Workington alongside Dave Hewson.

On 31 December 2018, Andrews was replaced by Gavin Skelton as manager, however after Skelton resigned just 6 days and two games into the role, Andrews became sole manager of Workington later on 7 January 2019. He stepped down at the end of the 2018–19 season, after the club were relegated from the Northern Premier League Premier Division.

== Personal life ==
Andrews was born in Carlisle, Cumbria. He is now employed as a Facilities Manager for a National rail services provider working within the nuclear industry.
