= There! I've Said It Again (album) =

Studio album by Bobby Vinton
- Released: 1964
- Genre: Pop
- Label: Epic
- Producer: Bob Morgan

Bobby Vinton chronology
Blue on Blue (1963)	There! I've Said It Again (1964)	Tell Me Why (1964)

Singles from There! I've Said It Again
- 1. "There! I've Said It Again" Released: November 7, 1963; 2. "My Heart Belongs to Only You" Released: February 1964

Professional ratings
Review scores
Source	Rating
Record Mirror	3/5 stars

There! I've Said It Again is the seventh studio album by American singer Bobby Vinton, released in 1964, by Epic Records. It reached No. 8 on the Billboard Hot 200 list of popular albums. Included inside the album cover is an overview of Vinton's career since the success of his first hit, "Roses Are Red (My Love)".

Two accompanying singles were released: the title track, and "My Heart Belongs to Only You" (a Billboard top multi recorded hit, written by Frank and Dorothy Daniels of Frandoro music). With the exception of "Warm and Tender" (co-written by Vinton), the entire album consists of songs that were made popular during the 1940s and early 1950s.

== Track listing ==
Side 1
No.	Title	Writer(s)	Length
1.	"You're Nobody till Somebody Loves You"	Russ Morgan, Larry Stock, James Cavanaugh	3:12
2.	"Unchained Melody"	Hy Zaret, Alex North	2:44
3.	"There! I've Said It Again"	Redd Evans, David Mann	2:20
4.	"If"	Robert Hargreaves, Stanley Damerell, Tolchard Evans	2:38
5.	"My Foolish Heart"	Ned Washington, Victor Young	2:36
6.	"Trying"	Billy Vaughn	2:50

Side 2
No.	Title	Writer(s)	Length
1.	"Lavender Blue"	Eliot Daniel, Larry Morey	2:52
2.	"To Each His Own"	Jay Livingston, Ray Evans	2:36
3.	"I Can Dream, Can't I?"	Irving Kahal, Sammy Fain	3:03
4.	"Warm and Tender"	Jack Lloyd, Bobby Vinton	2:44
5.	"My Heart Belongs to Only You"	Frank and Dorothy Daniels	2:42
6.	"Too Young"	Sylvia Dee, Sidney Lippman	2:42

== Personnel ==
- Bob Morgan – producer
- Stan Applebaum – string arrangements and conductor
- Henry Parker – photography

== Charts ==
=== Weekly charts ===
Chart (1964)	Peak position
US Billboard 200	8
