= Tell Me Why (1951 song) =

1951 song by Marty Gold

Single by Jerry Gray and His Orchestra
- A-side: "Re-Stringing the Pearls (A Ball of Twine)"
- Released: 1951
- Recorded: 1951
- Genre: Big band
- Length: 2:53
- Label: Decca
- Composer: Marty Gold
- Lyricist: Al Alberts

"Tell Me Why" is a popular song written by Marty Gold with the lyrics by Al Alberts. The song was published in 1951.

The first version of the song released was a recording by Jerry Gray and his orchestra, released by Decca company in 1951, as catalog number 27621, with the flip side "Restringing the Pearls", by Skeets McDonald (released by Capitol Records as catalog number 1957, with the flip side "Be My Life's Companion").

== Renditions ==
- A successful version of the song was recorded by Al Alberts' group, the Four Aces, on October 23, 1951, and released later the same year by Decca Records as catalog number 27860. It first reached the Billboard charts on November 30, 1951, and lasted 24 weeks on the chart, peaking at number two. The flip side was "A Garden in the Rain," also a success for the Aces.
- It was also recorded a brief time later by Eddie Fisher in a version that scored the Top 10. This version was recorded on December 5, 1951, and released by RCA Victor Records as catalog number 20-4444. It first reached the Billboard charts on December 28, 1951, and lasted 19 weeks on the chart, peaking at number seven. The flip side featured the song "Trust in Me."

"Tell Me Why"

Single by Bobby Vinton

from the album Tell Me Why
- B-side: "Remembering"
- Released: May 8, 1964
- Recorded: February 12, 1964
- Genre: Pop
- Length: 2:36
- Label: Epic
- Composer: Marty Gold
- Lyricist: Al Alberts
- Producer: Bob Morgan

Bobby Vinton singles chronology
"My Heart Belongs to Only You" (1964)	"Tell Me Why" (1964)	"Clinging Vine" (1964)

- Bobby Vinton released "Tell Me Why" in 1964. Vinton's version spent eight weeks on the Billboard Hot 100 chart, peaking at number 13, while reaching number three on Billboard's Pop-Standards Singles chart, and number 11 on the Cash Box Top 100. In Canada, Vinton's version debuted at number 11 in the first issue of the RPM "Top Forty-5s" chart. Vinton's version was ranked number 63 on Cash Box's "Top 100 Chart Hits of 1964".
- A version was recorded by Dinah Washington (recorded January 1952, released by Mercury Records as catalog number 8267, with the flip side "Wheel of Fortune").
- Alberto Semprini with Rhythm Acc. recorded it in London on March 26, 1952, as the third song of the medley "Part 2. Hit Medley of Foxtrots" along with "The Little White Cloud That Cried" and "I'm Lucky to Have You". It was released by EMI on the His Master's Voice label as catalog number B 10263.
- The Mastertouch Piano Roll Company of Australia released the song on a piano roll, catalogue number AD 4657, in 1951.
