= Clinging Vine =

Single by Bobby Vinton

from the album More of Bobby's Greatest Hits
- B-side: "Imagination Is a Magic Dream"
- Released: 1964
- Recorded: 1964
- Genre: Pop
- Length: 2:27
- Label: Epic
- Songwriters: Earl Shuman, Leon Carr & Grace Lane
- Producer: Bob Morgan

Bobby Vinton singles chronology
"Tell Me Why" (1964)	"Clinging Vine" (1964)	"Mr. Lonely" (1964)

"Clinging Vine" is a song released by Bobby Vinton in 1964. The song spent 8 weeks on the Billboard Hot 100 chart, peaking at No. 17, while reaching No. 2 on Billboard's Pop-Standards Singles chart, No. 14 on the Cash Box Top 100, No. 11 on Canada's RPM "Top 40-5s", and No. 9 on Canada's CHUM Hit Parade.

== Chart performance ==
Chart (1964)	Peak position
US Billboard Hot 100	17
US Billboard Pop-Standard Singles	2
US Cash Box Top 100	14
Canada - RPM Top 40-5s	11
Canada - CHUM Hit Parade	9

== Cover Versions ==
- Dean Martin covered the song for his 1964 Album The Door Is Still Open to My Heart
