= Coming Home Soldier =

Single by Bobby Vinton

from the album Bobby Vinton Sings the Newest Hits
- B-side: "Don't Let My Mary Go Round"
- Released: October 17. 1966
- Recorded: October 4, 1966
- Genre: Pop music
- Length: 2:29
- Label: Epic Records
- Songwriters: Bobby Vinton & Gene Allan
- Producer: Robert Mersey

Bobby Vinton singles chronology
| "Petticoat White (Summer Sky Blue)" (1966) | "Coming Home Soldier" (1966) | "For He's a Jolly Good Fellow" (1967) |

"Coming Home Soldier" is a song co-written and sung by Bobby Vinton, which he released in 1966. The song is a sequel to Vinton's previous hit "Mr. Lonely," sung from the perspective of a man who is returning home to the girl he loves, after having fought in a war overseas, and has survived without serious injury ("no Purple Heart"). The song spent 12 weeks on the Billboard Hot 100 chart, peaking at No. 11, while reaching No. 29 on Canada's CHUM Hit Parade, and No. 89 on Canada's RPM 100.

== Chart performance ==
| Chart (1966–1967) | Peak position |
|---|---|
| US Billboard Hot 100 | 11 |
| Canada - CHUM Hit Parade | 29 |
| Canada - RPM 100 | 89 |
