= Rain Rain Go Away (Bobby Vinton song) =

Single by Bobby Vinton

from the album Bobby Vinton Sings the Big Ones
- B-side: "Over and Over"
- Released: August 1962
- Recorded: July 11, 1962
- Studio: Columbia 30th Street Studio, New York City
- Genre: Pop music
- Length: 2:55
- Label: Epic Records
- Songwriters: Gloria Shayne Baker & Noël Regney

Bobby Vinton singles chronology
"I Love You The Way You Are" (1962)	"Rain Rain Go Away" (1962)	"Let's Kiss and Make Up" (1962)

"Rain Rain Go Away" is a song released by Bobby Vinton in August 1962.

== Background ==
The song is sung from the perspective of a man who is wishing his childhood sweetheart sunshine after she asks to be set free so that she can marry another. Epic Records was attempting to have Bobby Vinton's follow-up recording follow the various tropes established by "Roses Are Red" (a "singalong" melody with a sentimental storyline) - but for reasons of his own, Bobby was uninterested in the song. He had already written and recorded "Mr. Lonely", intending that song to be his follow up single; to his shock, he found the label was also giving the song to Buddy Greco, whom the label was grooming to be their next superstar. To Epic, "Roses Are Red" was something of a fluke, with Bobby's true talent laying more in the direction of songwriting as opposed to singing. Bobby was out touring the country enjoying the big success of "Roses Are Red", and without awareness to the fact that Epic had already released "Rain" as his follow-up; he reflected on its chart positioning thus: "Deep down inside, I knew that 'Rain' wasn't number one material."

== Chart performance ==
In the US, the song spent 11 weeks on the Billboard Hot 100 chart, peaking at No. 12, while reaching No. 4 on Billboard's Easy Listening chart, Outside the US, "Rain Rain Go Away" went to No. 11 on Canada's CHUM Hit Parade, and No. 10 in Israel.

Chart (1962)	Peak position
US Billboard Hot 100	12
US Billboard Pop-Standard Singles	4
Canada - CHUM Hit Parade	11
Israel - Kol Yisrael	10
