= Blue on Blue (Bobby Vinton album) =

Studio album by Bobby Vinton
- Released: August 1963
- Studio: Columbia (Nashville, Tennessee)
- Genre: Pop
- Length: 28:46
- Label: Epic
- Producer: Bob Morgan

Bobby Vinton chronology
| The Greatest Hits of the Golden Groups (1963) | Blue on Blue (1963) | There! I've Said It Again (1964) |

Singles from Blue on Blue
- 1. "Blue on Blue" Released: April 1963; 2. "Blue Velvet" Released: 1963

Blue on Blue, later renamed Blue Velvet, is Bobby Vinton's sixth studio album, released in 1963. Cover versions include the jazz songs "St. Louis Blues" and "Blueberry Hill", "Am I Blue", "Blue, Blue Day", the Fleetwoods' hit "Mr. Blue", "My Blue Heaven", three show tunes ("Blue Skies", "Blue Hawaii" and "Blue Moon"), and The Clovers Rhythm and blues hit, "Blue Velvet".

The song "Blue on Blue" was mentioned in Kim Mitchell's hit song "Patio Lanterns".

== Composition and background ==
Completely devoted to songs that refer to the color blue, this album contained two singles: "Blue on Blue", which reached #3 on the U.S. Pop charts and "Blue Velvet", which went on to #1 for three weeks on the same chart. Both songs served as title tracks during their popularity. The album was released after the success of the song "Blue on Blue", but when "Blue Velvet" became a hit, the album's title was changed with it being the title track. It was only after the title change that the album managed to enter the Billboard 200 list of popular albums; it reached #10.

== Track listing ==
Side 1
| No. | Title | Writer(s) | Length |
|---|---|---|---|
| 1. | "Blue on Blue" | Hal David, Burt Bacharach | 2:26 |
| 2. | "Am I Blue" | Harry Akst, Grant Clarke | 2:19 |
| 3. | "Blue, Blue Day" | Don Gibson | 1:53 |
| 4. | "Mr. Blue" | DeWayne Blackwell | 2:30 |
| 5. | "Blue Velvet" | Bernie Wayne, Lee Morris | 2:47 |
| 6. | "St. Louis Blues" | W.C. Handy | 2:27 |

Side 2
| No. | Title | Writer(s) | Length |
|---|---|---|---|
| 1. | "Blue Skies" | Irving Berlin | 2:17 |
| 2. | "Blue Hawaii" | Leo Robin, Ralph Rainger | 2:08 |
| 3. | "Blue Moon" | Lorenz Hart, Richard Rodgers | 2:40 |
| 4. | "Little Miss Blue" | Bobby Vinton, Shirley Formosa | 2:08 |
| 5. | "Blueberry Hill" | Al Lewis, Larry Stock, Vincent Rose | 2:31 |
| 6. | "My Blue Heaven" | Walter Donaldson, George Whiting | 1:50 |

== Personnel ==
- Bob Morgan - producer
- Burt Bacharach - arranger, conductor
- Hank Parker - cover photo

== Charts ==
Album - Billboard (United States)

| Year | Chart | Position |
|---|---|---|
| 1963 | The Billboard 200 | 10 |

Singles - Billboard (United States)

| Year | Single | Chart | Position |
|---|---|---|---|
| 1963 | "Blue on Blue" | Billboard Hot 100 | 3 |
| 1963 | "Blue on Blue" | Billboard Middle-Road Singles | 2 |
| 1963 | "Blue Velvet" | Billboard Hot 100 | 1 |
| 1963 | "Blue Velvet" | Billboard Middle-Road Singles | 1 |
| 1963 | "Blue Velvet" | UK Singles Chart | 2 |
