= Roses Are Red (album) =

Studio album by Bobby Vinton
- Released: July 1962
- Genre: Pop
- Length: 32:20
- Label: Epic
- Producer: Robert Morgan

Bobby Vinton chronology
Bobby Vinton Plays for His Li'l Darlin's (1961)	Roses Are Red (1962)	Bobby Vinton Sings the Big Ones (1962)

Roses Are Red is Bobby Vinton's third studio album, released in 1962. After Vinton's hit "Roses Are Red (My Love)" reached No. 1 (and saved Vinton from being fired from Epic Records), the eponymous album was released and made its way up to No. 5 on the Billboard 200. Shortly after the success of the song and album, Epic renewed Vinton's contract but changed his artist title from a bandleader to a solo artist.

"Roses Are Red (My Love)" is the first track on the album. Cover versions include "Sentimental Me", Cole Porter's "True Love", Roy Orbison's hit "Crying", "If I Give My Heart to You" and five country songs ("I Fall to Pieces", "Have I Told You Lately That I Love You?", "I Can't Stop Loving You", "I Can't Help It" and "Please Help Me, I'm Falling"). Vinton's 1964 No. 1 hit "Mr. Lonely" (co-written by Vinton) was originally only an album track here; its release as a single was two years later when it appeared on Bobby Vinton's Greatest Hits.

== Track listing ==
Side 1
No.	Title	Writer(s)	Length
1.	"Roses Are Red (My Love)"	Paul Evans, Al Byron	2:38
2.	"Sentimental Me"	Jimmy Cassin, Jim Morehead	2:51
3.	"I Fall to Pieces"	Hank Cochran, Harlan Howard	2:49
4.	"Mr. Lonely"	Bobby Vinton, Gene Allan	2:40
5.	"Have I Told You Lately that I Love You?"	Scotty Wiseman	2:42
6.	"I Can't Stop Loving You"	Don Gibson	2:35

Side 2
No.	Title	Writer(s)	Length
1.	"I Can't Help It"	Hank Williams	2:49
2.	"True Love"	Cole Porter	2:19
3.	"Always in My Heart"	Kim Gannon, Ernesto Lecuona	2:22
4.	"Crying"	Roy Orbison, Joe Melson	2:41
5.	"If I Give My Heart to You"	Jimmy Brewster, Jimmie Crane, Al Jacobs	2:36
6.	"Please Help Me, I'm Falling"	Don Robertson, Hal Blair	2:33

== Personnel ==
- Robert Morgan - producer
- Henry Parker - cover photo

== Charts ==
Album - Billboard (United States)

Year	Chart	Position
1962	Billboard 200	5

Singles - Billboard (United States)

Year	Single	Chart	Position
1962	"Roses Are Red (My Love)"	Billboard Hot 100	1
1962	"Roses Are Red (My Love)"	Billboard Adult Contemporary	1
1962	"Roses Are Red (My Love)"	Norwegian record chart	1
1962	"Roses Are Red (My Love)"	Billboard R&B Singles	5
1962	"Roses Are Red (My Love)"	UK Singles Chart	15
1964	"Mr. Lonely"	The Billboard Hot 100	1
1964	"Mr. Lonely"	Billboard Adult Contemporary	3
