= My Heart Belongs to Only You =

Single by Bobby Vinton

from the album There! I've Said It Again
- B-side: "Warm and Tender"
- Released: February 1964
- Recorded: October 23, 1963
- Genre: Pop
- Length: 2:42
- Label: Epic
- Songwriters: Frank Daniels & Dorothy Daniels

Bobby Vinton singles chronology
"There! I've Said It Again" (1963)	"My Heart Belongs to Only You" (1964)	"Tell Me Why" (1964)

"My Heart Belongs to Only You" is a song written by Frank Daniels & Dorothy Daniels. Bette McLaurin and June Christy both released versions of the song in 1952. In 1953, the song reached No. 27 on Cash Box's chart of "The Nation's Top 50 Best Selling Records", in a tandem ranking of June Christy, Bette McLaurin, these versions were marked as bestsellers.

== Bobby Vinton recording ==
The most successful version of the song was recorded by Bobby Vinton on October 23, 1963, and released in February 1964, backed by arranger/conductor Stan Applebaum, and which was released in February 1964. It was released as a single and on the album There! I've Said It Again. Bobby Vinton's version spent nine weeks on the Billboard Hot 100 chart, peaking at No. 9, while reaching No. 2 on Billboard's Middle-Road Singles chart, No. 8 on the Cash Box Top 100, No. 8 on the Music Vendor Top 100 Pop chart, and No. 15 on Canada's CHUM Hit Parade.

=== Charts ===
Chart (1964)	Peak position
U.S. Billboard Hot 100	9

== Other recordings ==
- In 1953, Arbee Stidham, and Terry Timmons both recorded versions of the song.
- Mary Swan released a version of "My Heart Belongs to Only You" in 1958. Swan performed the song on Dick Clark's American Bandstand.
- Jackie Wilson released a version of "My Heart Belongs to Only You" in 1961, which spent six weeks on the Billboard Hot 100 chart, peaking at No. 65, while reaching No. 48 on the Cash Box Top 100.
- The Standards released their version in 1963 on Chess Records.
- The Twilights released their version in 1959 on Finesse Records. The Twilights later became The Embers that recorded the minor hit "Solitaire" in 1961.
- The 1989 song "All I Want For Christmas is You" by Vince Vance & the Valiants employs a melody that is loosely based on this song.
