= Redd Evans =

Redd Evans (July 6, 1912 – August 29, 1972) was a lyricist whose songs have been recorded by Nat King Cole, Frank Sinatra, Doris Day, and many others. He may be best known for "There! I've Said It Again", a song that Bobby Vinton took to the top of the Billboard Hot 100 chart on January 4, 1964; this song was co-written with David Mann. His other well known compositions include "Don't Go to Strangers", "Rosie the Riveter", and "The Frim-Fram Sauce".
