= Noël Regney =

French World War II veteran and songwriter

Noël Regney (born Léon Schlienger; 19 August 1922 – 22 November 2002), was a French World War II veteran and songwriter who is best known for composing the Christmas standard "Do You Hear What I Hear?" with his then-wife Gloria Shayne Baker in 1962. Originally from Alsace, France, he moved to New York City and then eventually to Connecticut.

== Life and career ==
Léon Schlienger was born on 19 August 1922, in Strasbourg, Alsace, France. Léon Schlienger, written backwards, is Noël Regnei (-lhcS). He grew up Catholic, but later became a Unitarian Universalist.

Regney was drafted into the Nazi army despite being a Frenchman like many other "Malgré-nous". As an Alsatian, he spoke the German dialect Alsatian as fluently as French. It is said that Regney soon deserted, joined a group of French Resistance fighters, and became a double agent working for the French. He led a party of Nazis into an ambush, was shot in the arm, but survived. Eventually, while touring the United States, accompanying Lucienne Boyer, contemporary of Édith Piaf, Regney met his first wife pianist/composer Gloria Shayne with whom in 1962, he composed the Christmas song "Do You Hear What I Hear?"

Regney and Shayne also composed "Rain, Rain, Go Away", "Sweet Little Darlin'", and "What's The Use of Crying". He led an ensemble that backed Kay Lande's vocals on For Sleepyheads Only (1962). He wrote the English lyrics for The Singing Nun (Soeur Sourire)'s famous song "Dominique", the very name of his second wife, Dominique Gillain, though that is not to say that he co-wrote the song, which he had claimed. Together, Regney and Gillain had a son Matthieu, born in 1982. Regney wrote the book and music for a musical biography of French writer Colette as well as other musicals: "Merrimount" and "Landsake". He knew the composers Darius Milhaud and Arthur Honegger, studied with Olivier Messiaen, may have studied with Honegger, and worked at Le Lido in Paris. In the mid-1960s, Regney led a group known as the Noel Regney Singers that released a children's album featuring folk songs in French and English called "Songs that Help You Learn French". There was a Spanish-English version as well.

Regney died on 22 November 2002 in Brewster, New York, of complications from Pick's disease.
