= Marty Gold =

American composer

Martin Gold (December 26, 1915 – January 14, 2011) was an American composer, pianist, and bandleader born in New York City, New York, United States. He was the pianist and arranger for the Korn Kobblers, a popular 1940s novelty group billed as "America's most nonsensical dance band", but was probably best known as the composer of the song "Tell Me Why", which was a hit for The Four Aces in 1951.

Gold also arranged, conducted, and recorded for RCA Victor light orchestral "mood music" pieces utilizing fully the possibilities of the newly developed stereophonic sound, with whole sections of violins drifting between right and left speakers.

He conducted (along with Sid Ramin) The Three Suns' The Sounds of Christmas (RCA, 1955) and The Three Chuckles's self-titled LP (RCA, 1956). He produced two of Peter Nero's first albums for RCA Records (1961) and also conducted the accompanying orchestra. While at RCA, he had the distinction of playing on pre-Columbia signed Barbra Streisand's RCA audition demo in March, 1962.

Gold died on January 14, 2011, in Agoura Hills, California, at the age of 95.

== Discography ==
- Wired for Sound (Vik Records, 1956)
- Sticks and Strings (Vik Records, 1956)
- Higher Than Fi (Vik Records, 1957)
- Hi Fi Fo Fum (Vik Records, 1958)
- Sticks and Bones (RCA Victor, 1958)
- By the Waters of the Minnetonka (Kapp, 1959)
- College Songs in Stereo (Kapp, 1959)
- Swingin' West (RCA Victor, 1960)
- It's Magic (RCA Victor, 1961)
- Stereo Action Goes Hollywood (RCA Victor, 1961)
- Music of Rodgers and Hart (RCA Victor, 1962)
- Sounds Unlimited (RCA Victor, 1963)
- Soundpower! Music To The Limits Of Audibility (RCA Victor, 1963)
- In A Young Mood (RCA Victor, 1964)
- Suddenly It's Springtime (RCA Victor, 1964)
- Sound's Sake! (RCA Victor, 1964)
- Something Special For Movie Lovers (RCA Victor, 1965)
- Classic Bossa Nova (RCA Victor, 1965)
- The Soundaroundus (RCA Victor, 1966)
- Black And Silver Fantasy (RCA Victor, 1966)
- A Tribute To The Musical Soul Of Hank Williams (RCA Victor, 1966)
- The Broadway Soundaroundus (RCA Victor, 1967)
- Moog Plays the Beatles (AVCO Embassy, 1969)
- Themes From The Movies Peter Pan, 1977)
- Star Wars (Music World, 1977)
