= Blue on Blue (song) =

1963 single by Bobby Vinton

Single by Bobby Vinton

from the album Blue on Blue
- B-side: "Those Little Things"
- Released: April 30, 1963
- Recorded: April 3, 1963
- Genre: Pop
- Length: 2:21
- Label: Epic
- Songwriters: Burt Bacharach; Hal David
- Producer: Bob Morgan

Bobby Vinton singles chronology
"Over the Mountain (Across the Sea)" (1963)	"Blue on Blue" (1963)	"Blue Velvet" (1963)

"Blue on Blue" is a popular song composed by Burt Bacharach with lyrics by Hal David, first recorded and released by Bobby Vinton in April 1963, backed by Burt Bacharach and his Orchestra. Vinton's single spent 13 weeks on the Billboard Hot 100 chart, peaking at No. 3 on July 6, 1963, while reaching No. 2 on Billboard's Middle-Road Singles chart. Vinton's single was a major hit in many other nations as well.

The song was ranked No. 42 on Billboard's end of year ranking "Top Records of 1963".

The success of "Blue on Blue" prompted Bobby Vinton to record an entire album of blue-themed songs, also titled Blue on Blue, which produced an even bigger hit in the No. 1 "Blue Velvet".

== Chart performance ==
Chart (1963)	Peak position
US Billboard Hot 100	3
US Billboard Middle-Road Singles	2
Israel - Kol Yisrael	1
Canada - CHUM Hit Parade	4
New Zealand - "Lever Hit Parade"	5
Australia - Music Maker	7
Hong Kong	9

== Cover versions and samples ==
The song has been covered or sampled by many artists, including:

- Paul Anka (1963)
- Percy Faith (1964), Maureen McGovern (1991), and many others.
- In 2017, Marc Almond released the song on his album of mainly covers called "Shadows & Reflections". Almond had previously sung "Blue on Blue" at a Burt Bacharach evening at the London Palladium, during which Bacharach performed as well.
- Samples of a cover by Gals and Pals from 1966 were included in Röyksopp's song "So Easy".
- "Blue on Blue" was also covered by Say Lou Lou in 2015 and used in commercials for the Swedish clothing company Gina Tricot.
