= Al Alberts =

American popular singer and composer

- Born: Al Albertini; August 10, 1922; Chester, Pennsylvania, U.S.
- Died: November 27, 2009 (aged 87) Arcadia, Florida, U.S.
- Occupations: Singer, musician, television presenter
- Formerly of: The Four Aces

Al Alberts (born Al Albertini, August 10, 1922 – November 27, 2009) was an American popular singer and composer.

== Early life and education ==
Albertini was born August 10, 1922, in Chester, Pennsylvania. He attended South Philadelphia High School in South Philadelphia. As a teenager, he appeared on the Horn and Hardart Children's Hour, a radio program.

After graduating from South Philadelphia High School, he went to Temple University and then United States Navy, where he met Dave Mahoney. They went on to found The Four Aces.

== Career ==
=== Music career ===
The Four Aces recorded the song "Three Coins in the Fountain", written by Jule Styne for the film of the same name. The song hit the No. 1 bestselling record twice in 1954, and won the Academy Award for Best Original Song the same year. Alberts also popularized the song "On the Way to Cape May", first through recording it, and then by performing it often on his later television show and specials.

The Four Aces biggest hit was "Love Is a Many-Splendored Thing", which was the theme to the 1955 film starring William Holden and Jennifer Jones. The song was a number one hit for four weeks, and it also won the Academy Award for best song.

In 1960, he recorded "On the Way to Cape May", a song about a man and woman falling in love on their way to Cape May, New Jersey. The song, written by Maurice "Buddy" Nugent, is a summertime anthem for the Philadelphia and South Jersey areas. The song became popular without the push of a major record label. It has become popular in a variety of 21st-century media, such as XM satellite and internet radio, and also enjoys regular airplay on many Delaware Valley AM and FM stations.

=== Television career ===
Alberts then became a television personality in Philadelphia, where he hosted a one-hour Saturday afternoon talent show, Al Alberts Showcase, which first aired on WKBS-TV, and then on WPVI-TV that featured a panel of local children known as the "Teeny Boppers". Also there was a group of young teenage dancers called the "Show Stoppers". Local talents of all ages would sing songs and perform dance routines. A young Andrew Pica made his debut on the show. Andrew would later go on to be a frequent guest and showstopper. The show helped launch the careers of Andrea McArdle, Sister Sledge, The Kinleys, and Teddy Pendergrass.

After 32 years of broadcasting, the show went off the air with Alberts' retirement in 2001.

== Death and legacy ==
Alberts died at his home in Arcadia, Florida, of complications from renal failure. He was cremated and his ashes were scattered in the sea.

The Broadcast Pioneers of Philadelphia posthumously inducted Alberts into their Hall of Fame in 2010.
