= David Mann (songwriter) =

American songwriter (1916–2002)

David Mann (October 3, 1916 — March 1, 2002), also known as David Freedman, was an American songwriter of popular songs. His best-known songs are "There! I've Said It Again" (1945), popularized first by Vaughn Monroe and later by Bobby Vinton; "Don't Go to Strangers," recorded by Etta Jones in 1960; "No Moon at All" (1947), recorded by Robert Goulet in (1963); and "In the Wee Small Hours of the Morning" (1955), recorded most notably by Frank Sinatra, but covered by many other artists over the decades.

== Career ==
Mann was able to play the piano by ear, at the age of four, and by 13, he was playing around Philadelphia. He attended the Curtis Institute of Music. In late 1939, Mann moved to New York and became a Decca Records session musician. He was in Charley Spivak's orchestra until 1941.

During World War II, Mann joined the United States Army. Upon his discharge from the Army in 1945, they had the honor of placing Mann as personal pianist to President Truman. Mann worked on or appeared in the films: Twenty Grand, I Dood It, Four Jills and a Jeep, Pin-Up Girl, and, during his Artie Shaw days, Second Chorus.

Mann wrote the song "Somebody Bad Stole de Wedding Bell", recorded by Eartha Kitt between 1952 and 1954. The song was released as a B-side to her 1954 non-album single "Lovin' Spree". As a B-side to "Lovin' Spree", the single charted at number 20 on the current US Billboard music chart. Later, in 2006, the song was released as a CD bonus track to her album That Bad Eartha.

His most enduring composition was "In the Wee Small Hours of the Morning", written with Bob Hilliard. The song has over 500 cover versions to its credit, over 100 available today on iTunes. "No Moon At All," written with lyricist Redd Evans, which follows the baroque chord changes of Bach's Double Violin Concerto. One of Mann's hits "There I've Said it Again"—the Bobby Vinton version of 1963—was the last chart-topper in the United States before the British Invasion. It was knocked off the top spot by the Beatles' song "I Want to Hold Your Hand". Thereafter, his songwriting career was replaced by journalism, writing an op-ed for The Suburban Trends, a local New Jersey newspaper, for 32 years until his death.

David Mann died in March 2002 from complications due to pneumonia and kidney failure.

== See also ==
- List of songs introduced by Frank Sinatra
