= There! I've Said It Again =

1941 song by Redd Evans and David Mann

Single by Vaughn Monroe and his Orchestra
- B-side: "Rum and Coca-Cola"
- Published: December 18, 1941 by Radio Tunes, Inc., New York
- Released: February 1945
- Recorded: December 21, 1944
- Genre: Popular music
- Length: 3:05
- Label: Victor 20-1637
- Songwriters: Redd Evans, David Mann

"There! I've Said It Again"

Single by Bobby Vinton

from the album There! I've Said It Again
- B-side: "The Girl with the Bow in Her Hair"
- Released: November 7, 1963
- Recorded: September 5, 1963
- Genre: Pop
- Length: 2:23
- Label: Epic
- Producer: Bob Morgan

Bobby Vinton singles chronology
"Blue Velvet" (1963)	"There! I've Said It Again" (1963)	"My Heart Belongs to Only You" (1964)

"There! I've Said It Again" is a popular song written and published by Redd Evans and David Mann in 1941. In early 1945, Vaughn Monroe and his Orchestra released Victor 20–1637, which reached the number one position on the Billboard's National Radio Airplay chart for five straight weeks, then no.2 for six more weeks, and a total run of 29 weeks. It finished 1945 as the no. 4 record of the year.

== 1945 versions ==
Vaughn Monroe's version of "There! I've Said It Again" reached No. 1 on Billboard's chart of "Records Most-Played on the Air", while also reaching No. 1 on Billboard's charts of "Best-Selling Popular Retail Records" and no. 2 on "Most-Played Juke Box Records".

Jimmy Dorsey released a version of "There! I've Said It Again" in 1945, which reached No. 8 on Billboard's chart of "Records Most-Played on the Air" and No. 12 on Billboard's chart of "Most-Played Juke Box Records". A version was also released by The Modernaires with Paula Kelly in 1945, which was a hit that year.

== Bobby Vinton version ==
Bobby Vinton, backed by arranger/conductor Stan Applebaum, recorded and released "There! I've Said It Again" as a single in the fall of 1963. In 1964, Vinton released the song on the album There! I've Said It Again.

Vinton's version topped the Billboard Hot 100 chart on January 4, 1964, and remained there for four weeks before being replaced by The Beatles' "I Want to Hold Your Hand", becoming the last US-made number 1 hit before the British Invasion. It was the first No. 1 song of 1964, and spent 13 weeks on the Billboard Hot 100 chart. The song also spent five weeks atop the Billboard Middle-Road Singles chart. It was Vinton's third number-one song on both charts, following "Roses Are Red (My Love)" and "Blue Velvet". Vinton's version also reached No. 1 on the Cash Box Top 100, No. 1 on New Zealand's "Lever Hit Parade", No. 5 on Canada's CHUM Hit Parade, and spent 10 weeks on the United Kingdom's Record Retailer chart, reaching No. 34.

Vinton's version was ranked No. 12 on Cash Box's "Top 100 Chart Hits of 1964".

== Other notable versions ==
Sam Cooke released a version of the song in 1959. Cooke's version spent five weeks on the Billboard Hot 100, reaching No. 81, while reaching No. 25 on Billboard's Hot R&B Sides chart.

Al Saxon released a version of the song in 1961, which reached No. 48 on the United Kingdom's Record Retailer chart.

A cover by Mickey Gilley peaked at No. 53 on the Billboard Hot Country Singles chart in 1989.
