= Mr. Lonely (Bobby Vinton song) =

Single by Bobby Vinton

from the album Roses Are Red
- B-side: "It's Better to Have Loved"
- Released: October 16, 1964
- Recorded: February 16, 1962
- Genre: Pop
- Length: 2:40
- Label: Epic
- Songwriters: Bobby Vinton, Gene Allan
- Producers: Bob Morgan; Arranged and conducted by Robert Mersey

Bobby Vinton singles chronology
| "Clinging Vine" (1964) | "Mr. Lonely" (1964) | "Dearest Santa" (1964) |

"Mr. Lonely" is a song co-written and recorded by the American singer Bobby Vinton, backed by Robert Mersey and his Orchestra. The song was first released on Vinton's 1962 album, Roses Are Red.

== Background ==
Vinton began writing the song in the late 1950s, while serving in the Army. The lyrics describe a soldier who is sent overseas and has no communication with his home. The singer laments his condition and wishes for someone to talk with.

The single of Vinton's recording was released just as the Vietnam War was escalating and many soldiers were experiencing a similar situation. Vinton's version was noted for his sobbing emotionally during the second verse. Vinton and Gene Allan later re-teamed to compose "Coming Home Soldier", which reached No. 11 on the Billboard Hot 100 in January 1967.

Although he turned out to be Epic Records' best-selling artist of the 1960s, the record company initially did not display confidence in Vinton. This song was included on his first vocal album, Roses Are Red, but it was not released as a single at that time. Vinton wanted it to be the followup to his first hit, "Roses Are Red," but Epic's executives chose the very similar "Rain Rain Go Away" instead, giving "Mr. Lonely" to Buddy Greco, whom they were grooming as their next big superstar.

Greco's version reached No. 64 on the Billboard Hot 100 chart on November 10, 1962. After Vinton heard Greco's version on the radio, the executives confessed to him that they felt he was more of a musician and songwriter than a singer. However, in the following months, Vinton's continued success as a vocalist made them reconsider their position.

Many months later, when Epic gave Vinton the choice of which song should be the twelfth and final selection for his greatest-hits album, he chose "Mr. Lonely". Following its inclusion on the album, many radio disc jockeys started to play the track.

With the song's newfound popularity came a rise in demand for Vinton's version to be released as a single. "Mr. Lonely" became one of Vinton's signature songs and a favorite with servicemen around the world. Epic subsequently built an entire album release around "Mr. Lonely" when it became a hit as a single.

In 1966, Vinton recorded a sequel in which the singer comes home safe, "Coming Home Soldier."

== Chart history ==
The song spent fifteen weeks on the Billboard Hot 100, reaching No. 1 on December 12, 1964, while reaching No. 3 on Billboard's Middle-Road Singles chart. In Canada, the song reached No. 1 on RPM's "Top 40 & 5" chart. The song also reached No. 2 on New Zealand's "Lever Hit Parade", No. 8 in Australia, and entered into the top 3 in South Africa.

In 1973, the song was re-released as a single, and it reached No. 24 in Flanders.
