= Bobby Vinton =

American singer (born 1935)

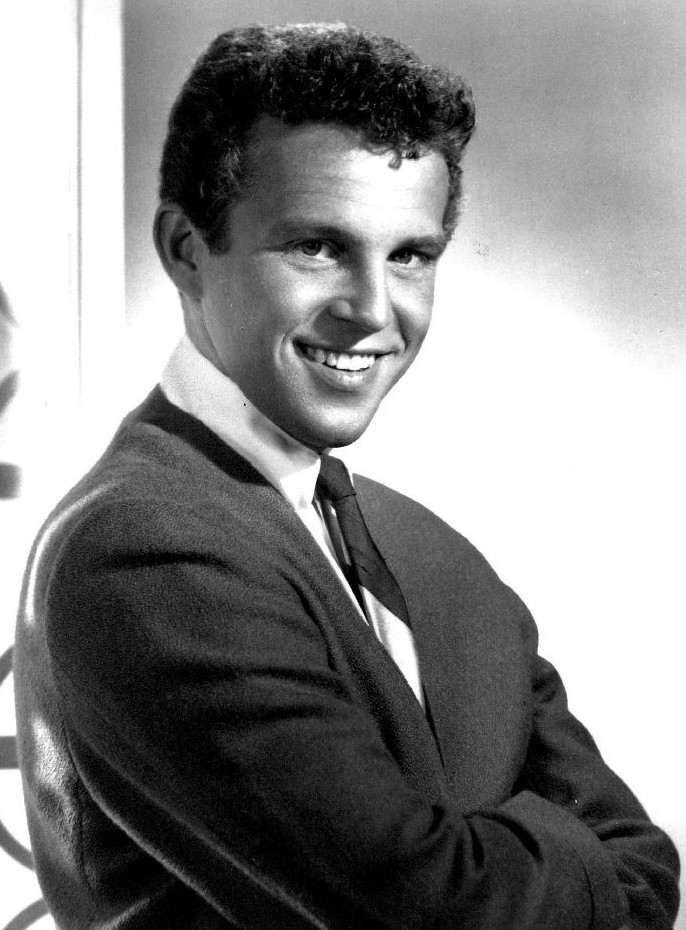
- Vinton in 1964

Background information
- Born: Stanley Robert Vinton; April 16, 1935 (age 91); Canonsburg, Pennsylvania, U.S.
- Genres: Pop; lounge
- Occupations: Singer; actor
- Years active: 1958–2015
- Labels: Bobby Records; Alpine records; Epic; ABC; Ahed; Tapestry; Curb
- Spouse: Dolores Vinton (m. 1962)
- Website: bobbyvinton.com

Stanley Robert Vinton (born April 16, 1935) is a retired American singer and actor, who hosted his own self-titled TV show in the late 1970s. As a teen idol, he became known as "The Polish Prince", as his music paid tribute to his Polish heritage. One of his most popular songs is "Blue Velvet" (a cover of the 1951 song recorded by Tony Bennett) which reached No. 1 on the Billboard Hot 100 in 1963, No. 1 in Canada (5 weeks), and number 2 in the UK in 1990.

== Early life ==
Vinton was born in Canonsburg, Pennsylvania, the only child of locally popular bandleader Stan Vinton and Dorothy Studzinski Vinton. He is of Polish and Lithuanian descent. The family surname was originally Vintula, and was changed by Vinton's father. Vinton's parents encouraged their son's interest in music by giving him his daily 25-cent allowance after he had practiced the clarinet.

While attending Canonsburg High School when he was age 15, Vinton formed his first band, which played clubs around the Pittsburgh area. With the money he earned, he helped finance his college education at Duquesne University where he graduated with a degree in musical composition in 1956. While at Duquesne, he became proficient on all of the instruments in the band: piano, clarinet, saxophone, trumpet, drums, and oboe. When Vinton became an active musician, it was common for people to become confused with the bands of father and son, for both were named Stanley. Vinton's father suggested his son use his middle name of Robert professionally to clear up the confusion.

Vinton's birthplace of Canonsburg, Pennsylvania, is also the birthplace of Perry Como. Vinton's hometown named two streets, Bobby Vinton Boulevard and the shorter adjoining Bobby Vinton Drive, in his honor. These streets were built in the late 1970s; prior attempts to name a residential street after him failed. The residents had not cared for the singer always claiming Pittsburgh as his home town on TV interviews. Como always claimed Canonsburg as his hometown, so hundreds of people changed their address when the town renamed a street in the east end after Perry Como. The Canonsburg town fathers had plans to erect a statue in Vinton's honour, but Vinton himself vetoed the idea, noting that the $100,000 planned cost could go to far more important town needs.

== Career ==
=== 1950s ===
According to his autobiography, Bobby was inspired to record his music by the Elvis Presley movie Jailhouse Rock. He formed his own record label, Bobby Records, in October 1958. His first release was "Twilight Time", backed with "Hallelujah". Bobby sang on the B-side of the 45 rpm release, making this his first commercially released vocal recording. This record did not chart. In March 1959, Bobby recorded for the Melody label out of Philadelphia, listed as "Bobby Vinton and his Orchestra" for the first time. His release of "Harlem Nocturne", backed with "Always in My Heart" with a vocal by Bobby, attracted attention in Pennsylvania. His 'young man with a big band' style was established here, and "Always In My Heart" was a song he returned to. In August 1959, Bobby moved to another larger record company, Alpine Records. He released two self-written singles for Alpine, the first being "You'll Never Forget" backed by "First Impression". The second Alpine release was "A Freshman and a Sophomore", backed with the self-written "The Sheik"; this was released in February 1960. Both Alpine releases garnered Billboard magazine mentions.

=== 1960s ===
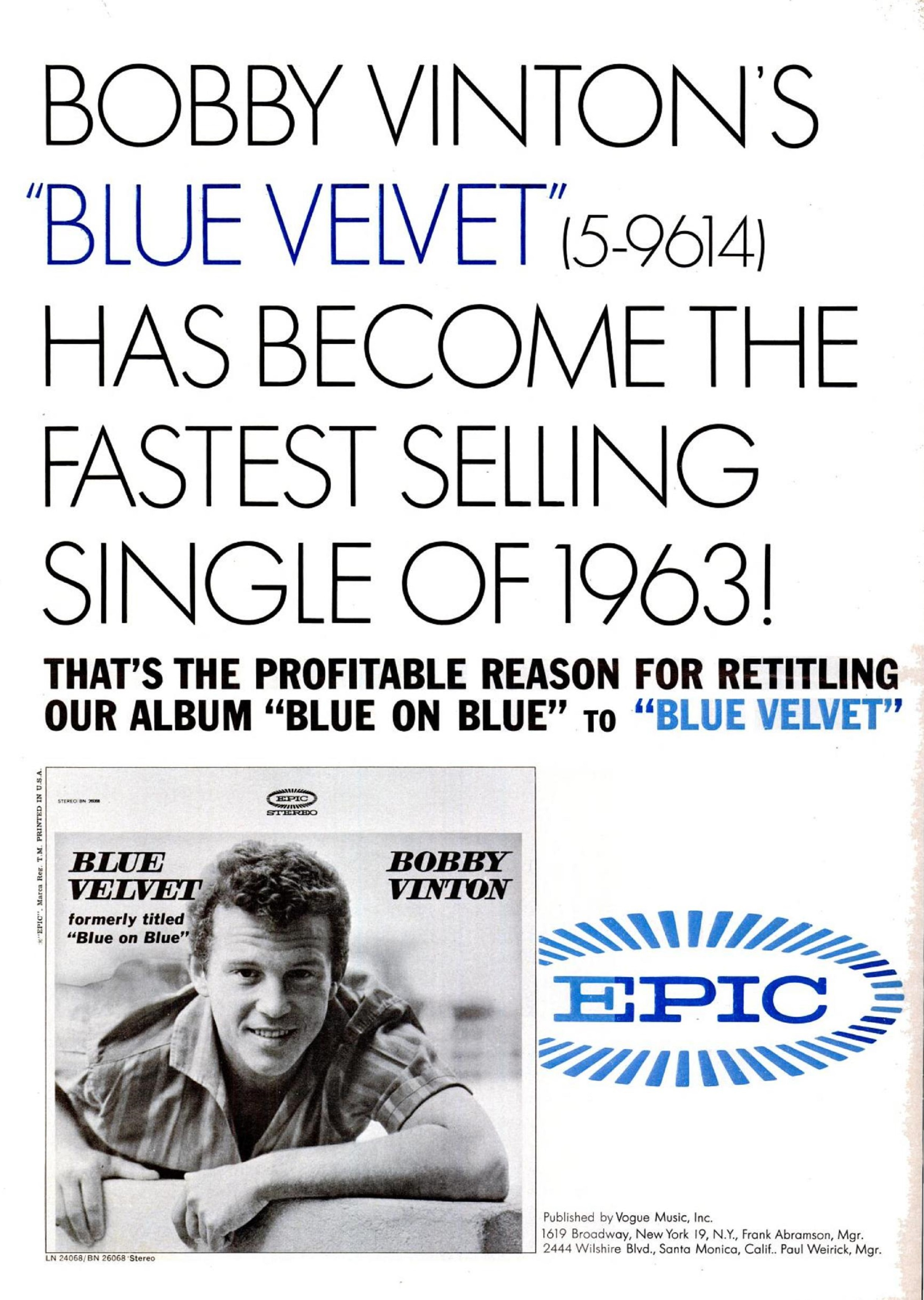
Billboard advertisement, September 14, 1963

After two years of service in the United States Army, in which he served as a chaplain's assistant, Vinton was signed to Epic Records in 1960 as a bandleader: "A Young Man With a Big Band". The break for the Epic Records contract had come after Vinton and his band appeared on Guy Lombardo's TV Talent Scouts program. Since March 20, 1961, his released three singles. Titled "Posin'" "Little lonely one" and "Well I ask ya", these records were his vocal recordings, and the flip sides were credited to "Bobby Vinton And His Orchestra". Despite the big label backing, the three singles were not successful, and two albums, Bobby Vinton Dancing At The Hop and Bobby Vinton Plays for his Lil Darlin's did not sell well. With Epic ready to drop him from its roster, Vinton found the material for his first hit single literally sitting in a reject pile. The song was titled "Roses Are Red (My Love)". Vinton had to do his own promotion for the song; he bought one thousand copies and hired a young woman to deliver a copy of the record and a dozen red roses to every local DJ. It spent four weeks at number one on the Billboard Hot 100. The song was also a hit on the Country and R&B charts. The success of the song pushed Epic to renew Vinton's contract and change his status from bandleader to solo singer.

Arguably, Vinton's most famous song is 1963's "Blue Velvet", originally a minor hit for Tony Bennett in 1951, that also spent three weeks at the number one positions in Billboard, Cash Box, and Record World magazines. In 1986, 23 years later, David Lynch named his movie Blue Velvet after the song. In 1990, "Blue Velvet" reached number 2 on the UK Singles Chart, after being featured in a Nivea commercial. The 1990 reissue also hit number 3 in the Irish Singles Chart and number 7 in Australia.

In 1964, Vinton had two number 1 hits, "There! I've Said It Again" (a number 1 hit in 1945 for Vaughn Monroe) in January and "Mr. Lonely" in December. Vinton's version of "There! I've Said It Again" is noteworthy for being the last U.S. Billboard number-one single of the pre-Beatles era, deposed from the Hot 100 summit by "I Want to Hold Your Hand". Also noteworthy is the fact that Vinton continued to have big hit records during the British Invasion, scoring 16 top-ten hits, while Connie Francis, Ricky Nelson, the Shirelles, and other major artists of the early 1960s struggled to reach even the Top 40.

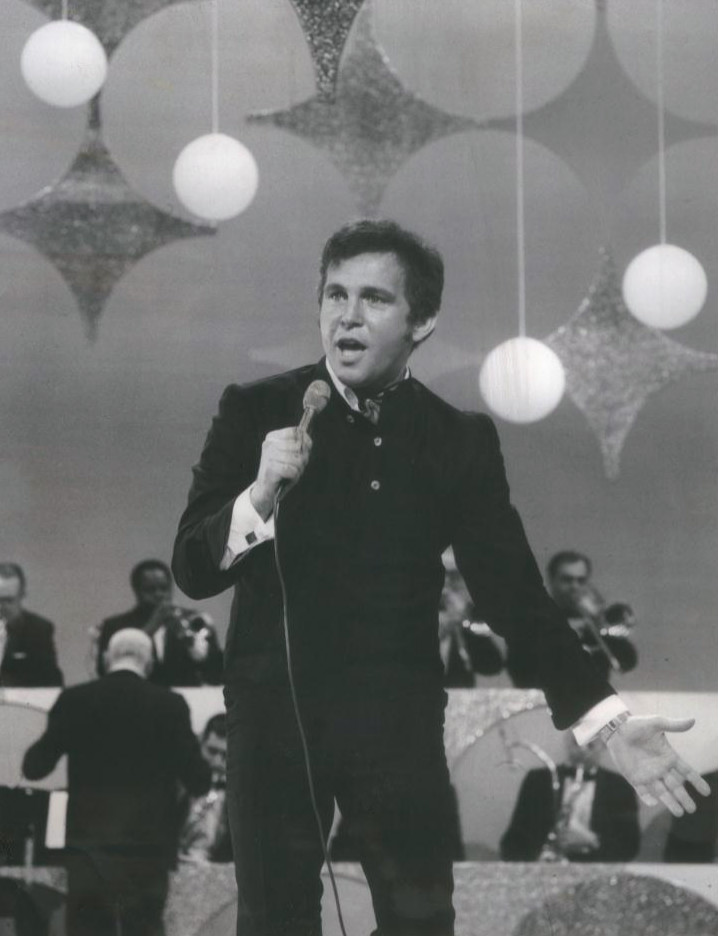
Vinton performing on The Ed Sullivan Show in 1969

Vinton wrote and composed "Mr. Lonely" during his chaplain's assistant service in the U.S. Army in the late 1950s. The song was recorded during the same 1962 session that produced "Roses Are Red (My Love)", and the two songs launched Vinton's singing career. It was released as an album track on the 1962 Roses Are Red (and other songs for the young & sentimental) LP. Despite pressure from Vinton to release it as a single, Epic instead had Buddy Greco release it and it flopped. Two years and millions of records sold later, Bobby prevailed on Epic to include "Mr. Lonely" on his Bobby Vinton's Greatest Hits LP. Soon DJs picked up on the song and airplay resulted in demand for a single release. "Mr. Lonely" shot up the charts in the late fall of 1964 to reach number 1 on the Hot 100 on December 12, 1964. Epic then released the LP Bobby Vinton Mr. Lonely; the song had now appeared on three Bobby Vinton albums released within two years. The song continued to spin gold for Vinton, its author-composer, in the 50+ years to date since reaching number 1; Harmony Korine named his 2007 film Mister Lonely after the latter and features the song in the film's opening, and it was also the basis for Akon's 2005 hit, "Lonely".

In 1965, Vinton continued his "Lonely" success streak with the self-written "L-O-N-E-L-Y". "Long Lonely Nights" peaked at number 17 and spawned an album, Bobby Vinton Sings for Lonely Nights. Vinton's self-written 1966 hit "Coming Home Soldier" hit No. 11 on the Hot 100 and was a favorite on request shows on the American Forces Network during the Cold War and Vietnam era, often called in by soldiers about to board the Freedom Bird that would take them back to the "Land of the Round Doorknobs". Vinton's lush 1967 remake of "Please Love Me Forever", which reached number 6 and sold over a million copies, began a string of twelve consecutive Hot 100 hits, all remakes, over a little less than five and a half years. His 1968 hit "I Love How You Love Me" surged to number 9, sold over one million copies, and was awarded a gold record by the RIAA.

=== 1970s ===
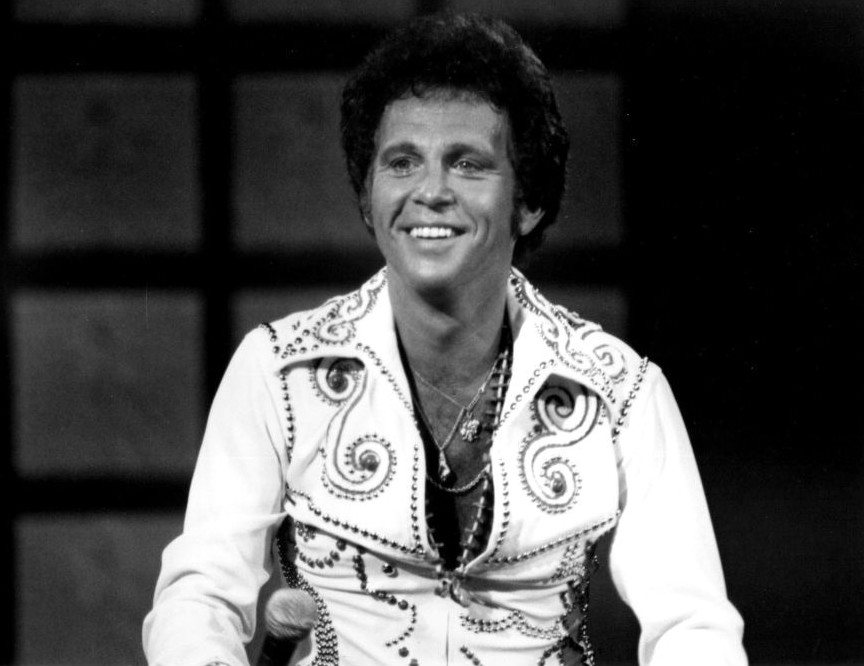
Vinton in 1977

In the 1970s, Vinton continued to hit the Top 40, notably with "Ev'ry Day of My Life", a No. 2 Adult Contemporary hit also awarded the Jukebox single of the year award which was produced by Jimmy Bowen and CBS recording engineer Jim Reeves, which peaked at number 24 on April 29, 1972, and "Sealed With a Kiss" hitting number 19 on August 19–26, 1972. Despite the success of the two hits, Epic Records decided to drop Vinton from his contract the following year, claiming that his days of selling records were over.

Undeterred, Vinton spent $50,000 of his own money on "My Melody of Love", partially self-written and partially sung in Polish. The suggestion for the song came from Vinton's mother. After six major labels turned Vinton down, Lindy Blaskey, Managing Director of A&R at ABC/Dunhill Records, bought Vinton's idea, and the result was a multi-million-selling single of simple lyrics that hit number 3 on the Billboard Hot 100, number 2 on the Cashbox Top 100 chart, and number 1 on the AC chart in 1974. A gold album, Melodies of Love, followed as well as one final Top 40 pop hit (the traditional "Beer Barrel Polka", also sung partially in Polish, b/w "Dick And Jane" in 1975). Vinton went on to record an additional four albums for ABC Records, three of which hit the Billboard Hot 200 albums chart. Epic Records rediscovered Vinton in the wake of his newfound success, releasing two albums of previously recorded material, both of which hit the top album charts. In addition, in a throwback to his career start in the 1950s, his two albums on Ahed were released in Canada. Party Music (1976) went platinum and 100 Memories (1979) was successful. In 1975, Vinton exploded onto televisions across the United States and Canada with a successful half-hour variety show, The Bobby Vinton Show, which aired from 1975 to 1978 and of which "My Melody of Love" was the theme song; ABC Records subsequently released an album of songs performed on the show.

In 1978, Vinton wrote his autobiography, titled The Polish Prince, which became a bestseller. In the same year, CBS-TV aired Bobby Vinton's Rock N' Rollers, a one-hour special that achieved top ratings.

=== 1980s–1990s ===
While appearing at Pittsburgh's Three Rivers Stadium prior to Game 4 of the 1990 National League Championship Series between the Pittsburgh Pirates and Cincinnati Reds, Vinton delivered a mixed-up rendition of "The Star-Spangled Banner" that left out many of the words and was off-key. Controversy ensued after CBS broadcaster Jack Buck said on air, "Well, when you're Polish and live in Pittsburgh, you can do anything you want with the words!"

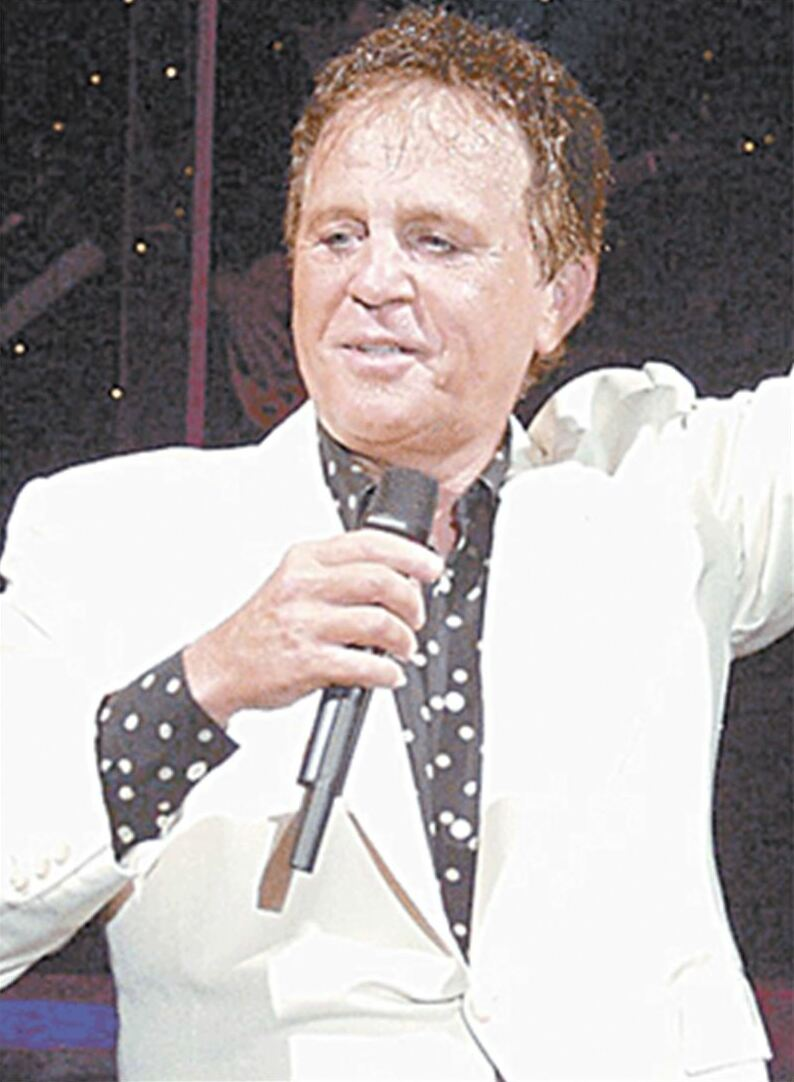
Vinton performing in 2004

=== Honors and achievements ===
In the early 1990s, Vinton found himself booked as a guest star at the Roy Clark Theatre in Branson, Missouri. He was unsure of his ability to draw at what was then a country-western-themed resort, and was shocked at the massive turnout for his concerts there. He was so impressed with the Branson model that he invested millions in building the Bobby Vinton Blue Velvet Theatre and enjoyed ten successful years there. In 2002 the theatre was sold to David King, creator and producer of Spirit of the Dance. Vinton returned to Branson periodically for limited engagements at the theatre.

Billboard Magazine called Bobby Vinton "the all-time most successful love singer of the 'Rock-Era'". From 1962 to 1972, Vinton had had more Billboard number 1 hits than any other male vocalist, including Elvis Presley and Frank Sinatra. In recognition of his recording career, Vinton was awarded a star on the Hollywood Walk of Fame, located at 6916 Hollywood Blvd.

Vinton's alma mater, Duquesne University, awarded him an honorary doctorate in music in 1978.

== Acting ==
Vinton appeared in seven acting roles during his singing career, commencing with the beach party movie Surf Party in 1964. In 1965, he played George Reynolds in the episode "Patty and the Newspaper Game" of ABC's sitcom The Patty Duke Show. He was also cast as Jeff McCandles in the 1971 John Wayne film Big Jake and as Ben Young in another Wayne film, The Train Robbers (1973). His last role as a character was as Bobby Gaines in the 1983 episode "Chance of a Lifetime" of the NBC family drama television series Boone, starring Tom Byrd, while his last scripted role as himself was in 1997, appearing in part one of the three part series finale of Coach.

== Personal life ==
Vinton and his wife, Dolores, have been married since December 17, 1962. They reside in Englewood, Florida, and have five children. In 2015, after contracting a serious case of shingles, Vinton retired from live performing and recording. He spoke to his fans and friends in February 2018 on The Cousin Brucie Show on Sirius XM radio, and encouraged all to get a shingles vaccination.

== Filmography ==
Year	Title	Role	Notes
1964	Surf Party	Len Marshall	also theme song ("If I Were an Artist")
1965	The Patty Duke Show	George Reynolds	Episode: "Patty and the Newspaper Game"
1965	Harlow	Theme song ("Lonely Girl") singer	Voice only
1971	Big Jake	Jeff McCandles	
1973	The Train Robbers	Ben Young	
1976	The Duchess and the Dirtwater Fox	Theme song ("Lemondrops, Lollipops and Sunbeams") singer	Voice only
1980	The Gossip Columnist	Marty Kaplan	Television film
1983	Boone	Bobby Gaines	Episode: "Chance of a Lifetime"
1985	Benson	Himself	season 6 episode 17 "Solid Gold"
1997	Coach	Himself	Episode: "Leaving Orlando: Part 1"

== Bibliography ==
- Vinton, Bobby (1978). The Polish Prince. M. Evans. ISBN 0-87131-270-0.
