= Bobby Vinton (1978 album) =

1978 Bobby Vinton compilation album

Compilation album by Bobby Vinton
- Released: 1978
- Genre: Pop
- Label: Pickwick

Bobby Vinton chronology
The Name Is Love (1977)	Bobby Vinton (1978)	Autumn Memories (1978)

Bobby Vinton is a nine-track collection of previously recorded songs by Bobby Vinton, released in 1978. It contains two singles and seven album tracks, all randomly picked and recorded for ABC Records.

== Track listing ==
=== Side one ===
Order	Title	Length	Original album	Writer(s)	Ref
1	"Feelings"	3:38	Heart of Hearts	Morris Albert	
2	"Beer Barrel Polka"	2:32	Heart of Hearts	Jaromír Vejvoda, Lew Brown, Wladimir Tim	
3	"Wooden Heart"	2:23	Heart of Hearts	Bert Kaempfert, Kay Twomey, Fred Wise, Ben Weisman	
4	"Polka Pose"	2:36	Heart of Hearts		
5	"Killing Me Softly With His Song"	4:01	The Bobby Vinton Show	Norman Gimbel, Charles Fox	

=== Side two ===
Order	Title	Length	Original album	Writer(s)	Ref
1	"Save Your Kisses for Me"	3:18	Serenades of Love	Tony Hiller, Lee Sheridan, Martin Lee	
2	"Waltz Medley": "Tales from the Vienna Woods," "Blue Skirt Waltz," and "You Are My One True Love"	3:39	Serenades of Love	Johann Strauss, Vaclav Blaha, Mitchell Parish, Bob Kames, R. Kaiser	
3	"Paloma Blanca"	3:17	Serenades of Love	Hans Bouwens	
4	"When Will I Be Loved"	2:01	The Bobby Vinton Show	Phil Everly	

== Album credits ==
- By arrangement with ABC Records
- Remastering engineer: Jack Daly
- Cover art: Brian Thompson
