= Bobby Vinton (disambiguation) =

Bobby Vinton is an American rock singer.

Bobby Vinton may also refer to:

- Bobby Vinton (1978 album), his 13th compilation album
- Bobby Vinton (1988 album), his 35th studio album
- Bobby Vinton (2001 album), his 35th compilation album
