= HMS LCT 147 =

Mark 2 Landing Craft Tank

Coordinates: 32°49′48″N 34°58′15″E

LCT 147
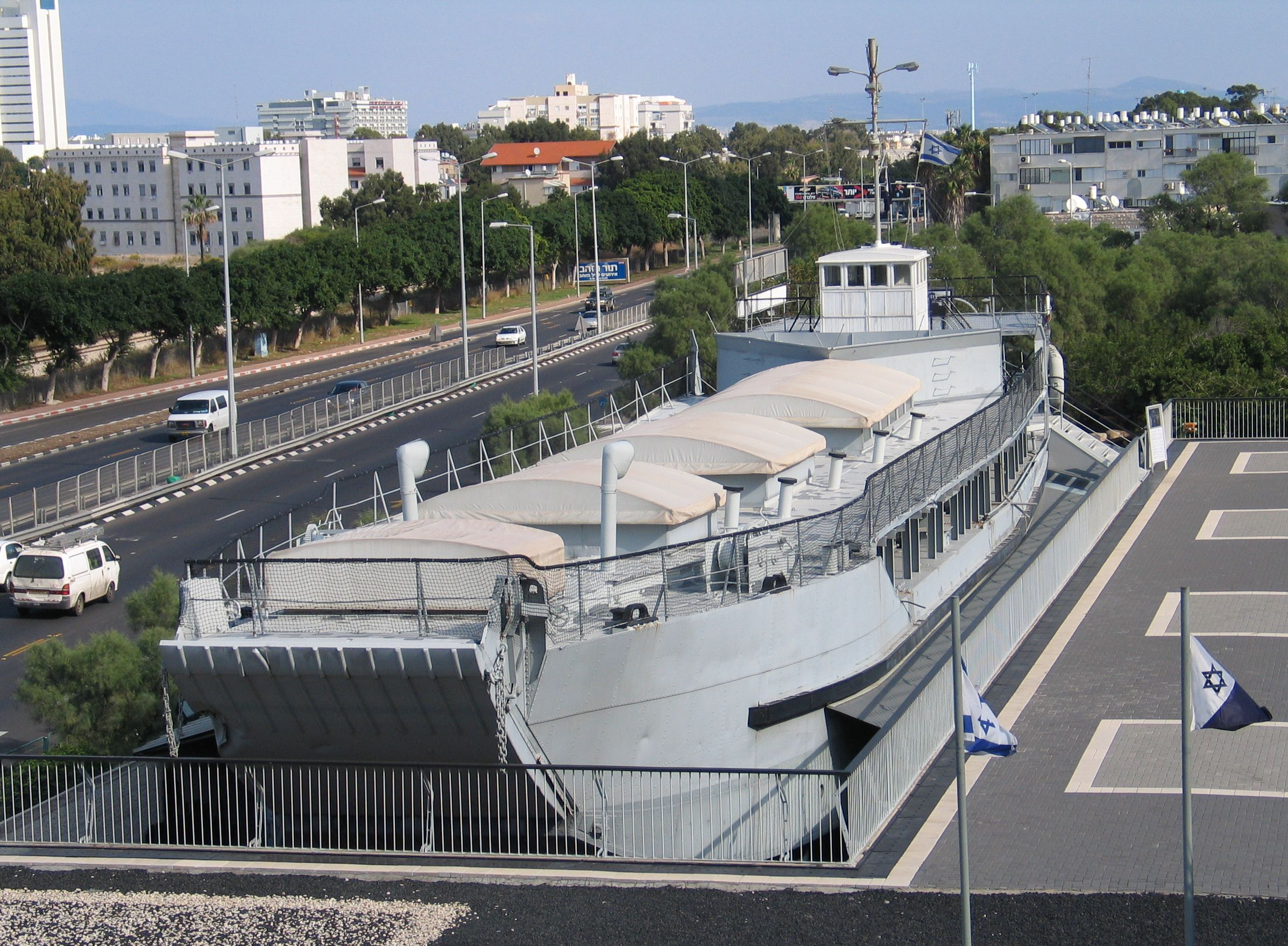
- Af Al Pi Chen on display outside Clandestine Immigration and Naval Museum in Haifa

History

United Kingdom
- Name: LCT 147; LCT(2)(R) 147
- Owner: Royal Navy
- Ordered: 3 January 1941
- Builder: Stockton Construction
- Laid down: 27 June 1941
- Launched: 23 September 1941
- Commissioned: 26 December 1941
- Decommissioned: May 1945
- Honours and awards: North Africa, 1942
- Fate: Transferred to Italy, 1946

Italy
- Name: Michael Parma
- Acquired: March 1946
- Decommissioned: 1946
- Fate: Transferred to the Mossad LeAliyah Bet, 1946

Israel
- Name: Af Al Pi Chen; (אף-על-פי-כן)
- Namesake: Af Al Pi Chen
- Owner: Mossad LeAliyah Bet; (1946–1947); Israeli Navy; (1948–1958)
- Status: Museum ship at Clandestine Immigration and Naval Museum in Israel

General characteristics
- Type: Mark 2 Landing Craft Tank
- Displacement: 590 short tons (535 t)
- Length: 159 ft 11 in (48.74 m)
- Beam: 30 ft (9.1 m)
- Draught: 3 ft 8 in (1.12 m) (forward)
- Propulsion: 3 × 460 hp (343 kW) Paxman diesels or 350 hp (261 kW) Napier Lion petrol engines, 3 shafts
- Speed: 10.5 knots (19.4 km/h; 12.1 mph)
- Range: 2,700 nmi (5,000 km)
- Capacity: 5 × 30-ton or 4 × 40-ton or 3 × 50-ton tanks or 9 trucks or 250 long tons (254 t) of cargo
- Complement: 12
- Armament: 2 × single 2-pounder pom-pom or 2 × single Bofors 40 mm guns
- Armour: Wheelhouse : 2.5 in (64 mm); Gun shield : 2 in (51 mm)

LCT 147 is an amphibious assault ship for landing tanks, other vehicles and troops on beachheads. Built in 1941 by Stockton Construction, Thornaby-on-Tees, the Mark 2 LCT 147 took part in the Invasion of North Africa in June 1943. The ship was converted to a Landing Craft Rocket at Portsmouth Dockyard from March through May 1943 and renamed LCT(2)(R) 147.

LCT 147 was decommissioned in 1946, and transferred to the Italian Navy but was sold to commercial service later that year until being acquired by the Mossad LeAliyah Bet. The ship was absorbed into the Israeli navy and became a museum ship in Haifa.

== Design ==
The LCT Mark 2 was longer and wider than the Mark 1, with three Paxman diesel or Napier Lion petrol engines replacing the Hall-Scotts. At 2,700 nautical miles (5,000 km; 3,100 mi), it had three times the range of its predecessor. Seventy-three Mk.2s were built.

== Construction and career ==
The ship was built by Stockton Construction in Thornaby-on-Tees, England and was designed to carry and land tanks. She was launched on 23 September 1941 and commissioned on 26 December 1941. In May 1943, she was converted to a Landing Craft Rocket at Portsmouth Dockyard from March through May 1943 and renamed LCT(2)(R) 147.

In June 1942, she was transferred to the Mediterranean where she took part in the Invasion of North Africa.

She was decommissioned from British service in May 1945. After the war offered For sale as war surplus and bought by an Italian shipping company in 1946. The ship was renamed Michael Parma by the Italian shipping company to carry agriculture products.

=== Af Al Pi Chen ===
In 1946, the ship was acquired by the Mossad LeAliyah Bet, one of the primary forces resisting the strict British immigration quotas from 1934 to 1948. During this era of clandestine immigration, 122,419 people were brought to Israel by 116 ships (the vast majority between 1945 and 1948). Af Al Pi Chen sailed just weeks after the famous Exodus 1947 episode. She was named after this event, Af Al Pi Chen means nonetheless or in spite of it all.

On 17 September 1947, Af Al Pi Chen departed Formia, Italy with 434 holocaust survivors crowded on board. She was heading toward the southern part of Palestine when she was detected by a British aircraft and 4 Royal Navy destroyers were dispatched. Af Al Pi Chen rammed one of the destroyers and eventually the British boarding teams took over Af Al Pi Chen and was towed to Haifa Bay. The immigrants were taken to internment camps in Cyprus but most eventually made their way to Israel in 1948.

In June 1948, the British mandate expired and the Israeli Navy was formed. The navy scrounged for any available ship in junkyards and Af Al Pi Chen was one of the ships they found and commissioned into the navy.

She participated in the 1948 Palestine war as a training ship.

During the 1956 Operation Musketeer, she took on her final role as a tank landing craft despite having her engines inoperable, it was planned to push her with a tugboat to land tanks near Gaza Strip. The Israeli Defense Forces took over the area before Af Al Pi Chen arrived so the landing was canceled.

Af Al Pi Chen was decommissioned in 1958 and in 1968, she was moved ashore and became the centerpiece of the Clandestine Immigration and Naval Museum in Haifa.

== Gallery ==
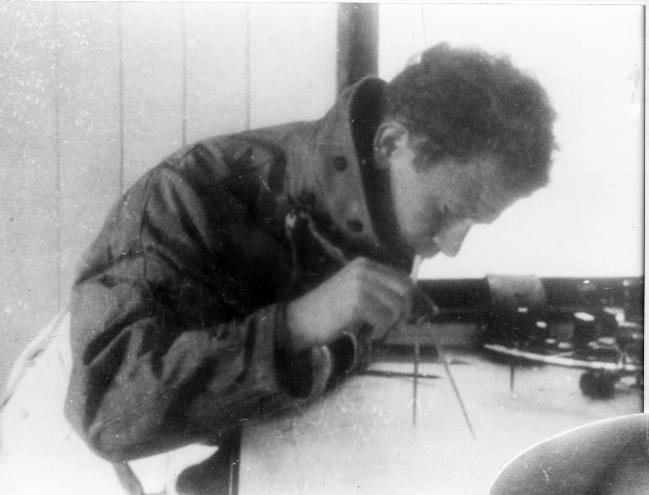
Command bridge of Af Al Pi Chen

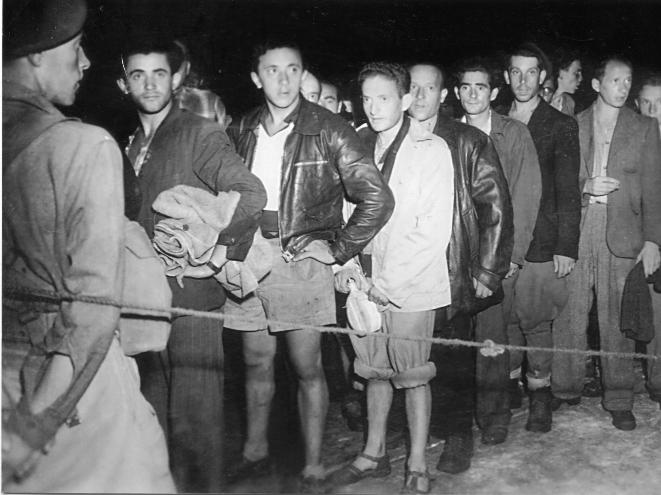
Illegal immigrants being detained from Af Al Pi Chen

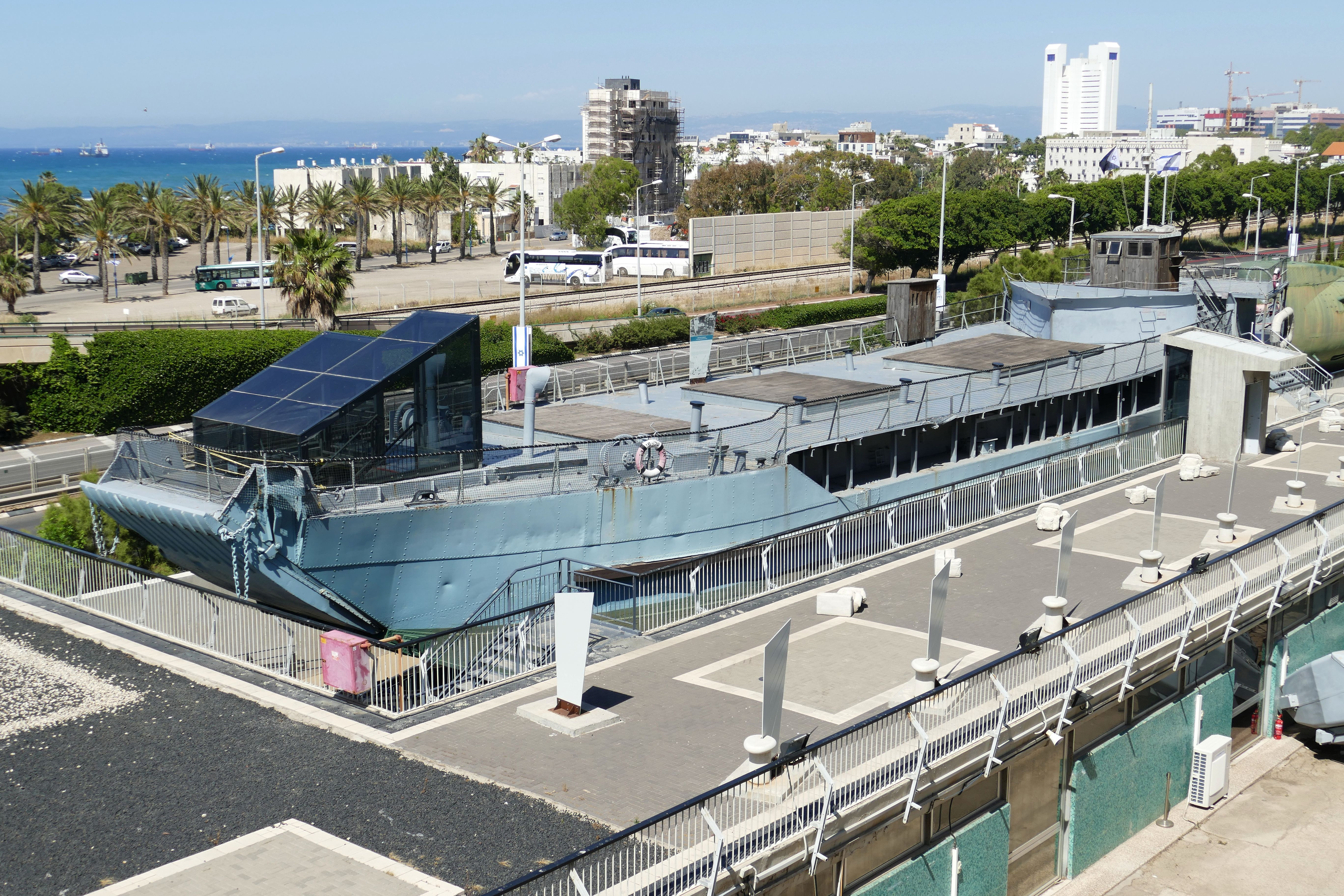
Af Al Pi Chen on display in 2019

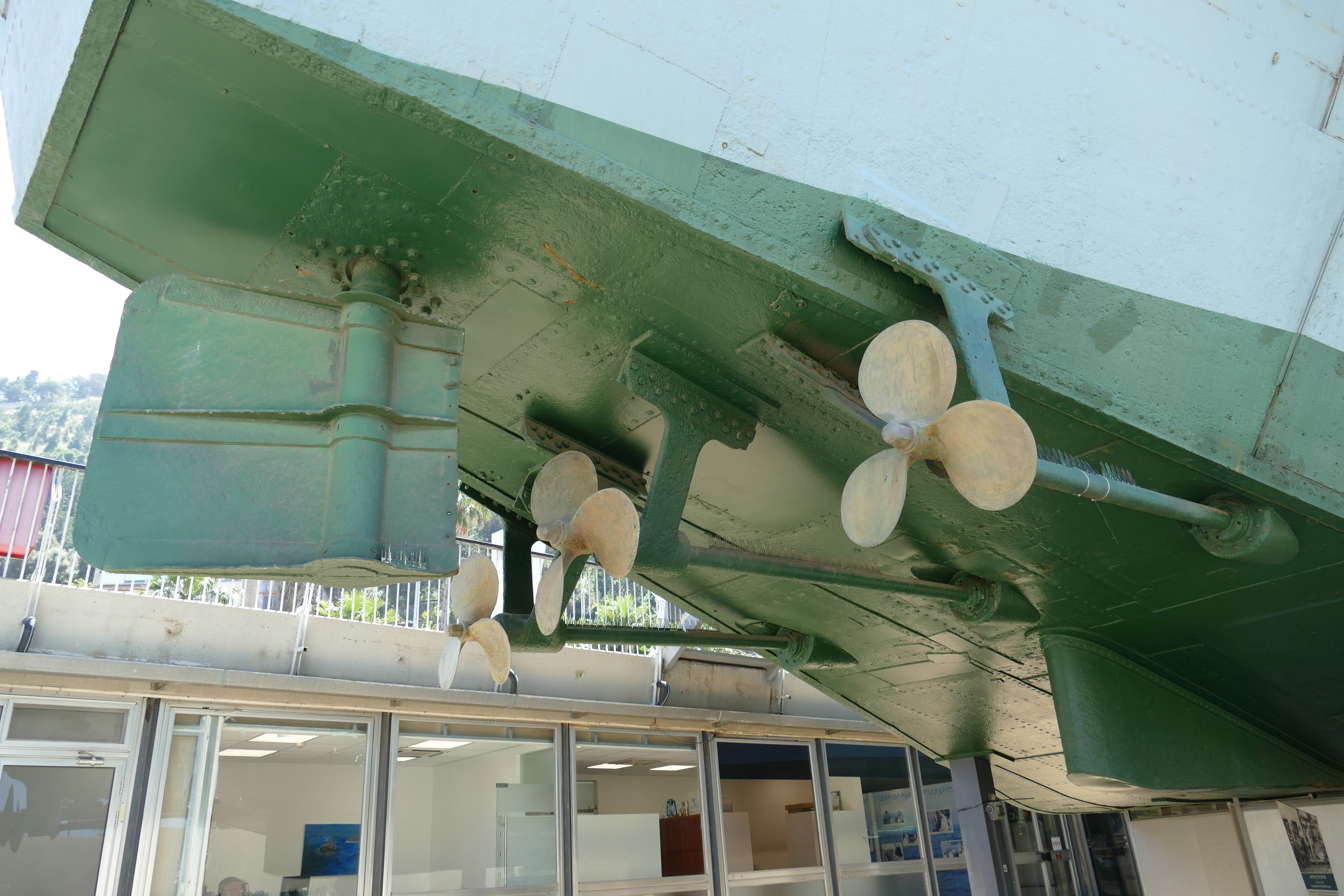
Af Al Pi Chen's propellers

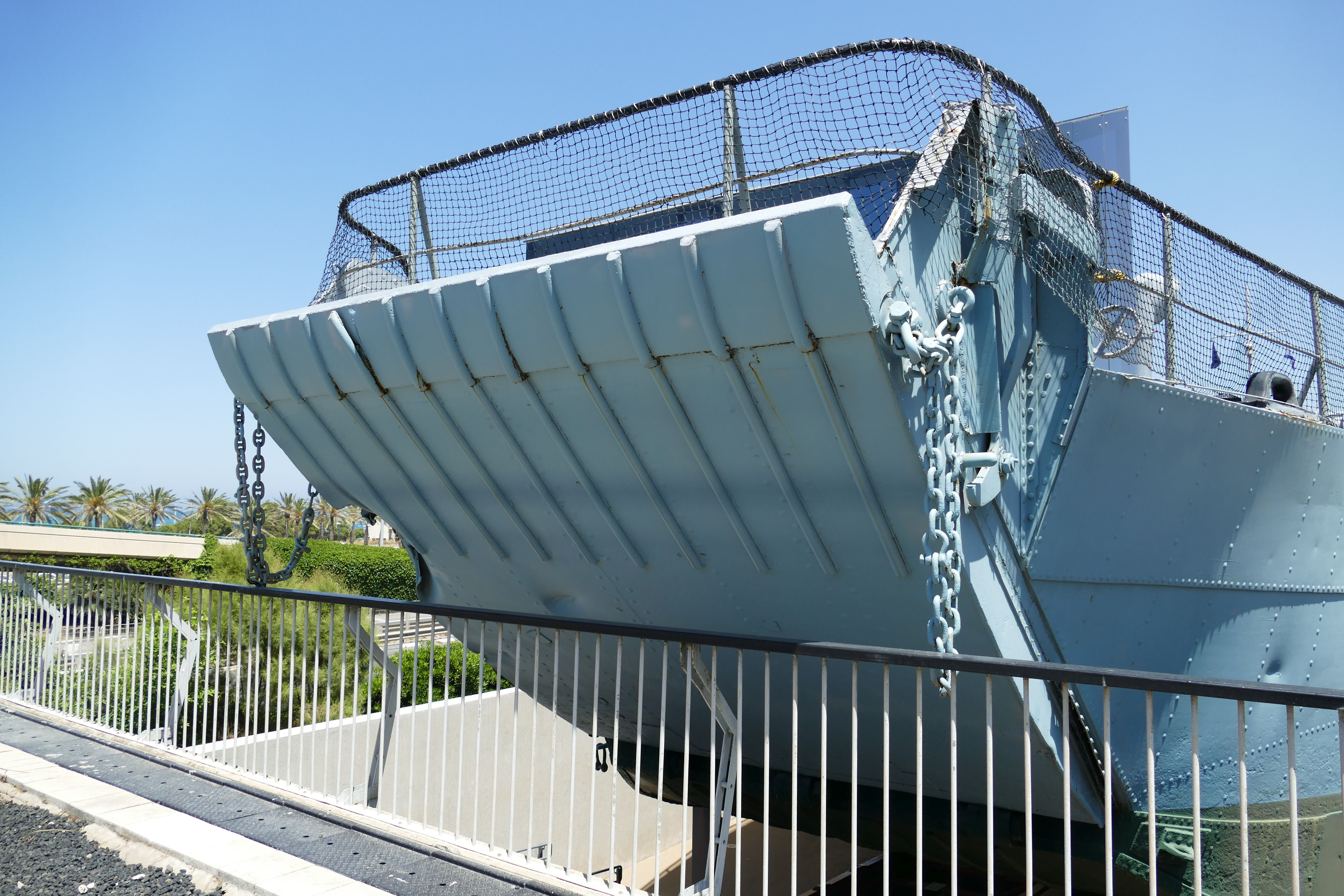
Af Al Pi Chen's bow ramp
