= Loulou Gasté =

French composer

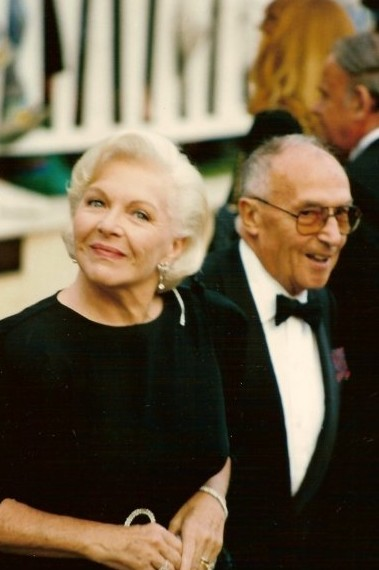
Gasté at the Cannes Film Festival with wife Line Renaud

Louis "Loulou" Gasté (18 March 1908 – 8 January 1995) was a French composer of songs. He composed more than 1000 songs, including "Battling Joe" and "For You". The song "For You" was popularised internationally as "Feelings" and has been covered almost 1200 times.

== Career ==
Louis Gasté was born in Paris on 18 March 1908. In his fifty-year career, he composed over 1000 songs, ten of which were internationally successful. In 1929, he played in Ray Ventura's orchestra, and composed several pieces for him.

== "Pour Toi" / "Feelings" / "Dis-Lui" dispute ==
In September 1956, Gasté composed "Pour Toi" ("For You") with lyrics by Albert Simonin and his wife Marie-Hélène Bourquin, for the singer Darío Moreno, who sang it in the film Le Feu aux Poudres. It was first released by Line Renaud, and was reinterpreted in France and internationally by various other singers.

In 1974, Morris Albert sang it in English and was credited as the original author of "Feelings", launched in São Paulo by Augusta Do Brazil. In 1975, Mike Brant brought it back to France under the title "Dis-Lui" ("Tell Her").

In 1976, "Feelings" was a worldwide success and was recorded by Elvis Presley, Frank Sinatra, Andy Williams, Dionne Warwick, Johnny Mathis, Julio Eglesias, and others.

In 1977, Gasté discovered the song was one of his melodies, and sued Morris Albert. On 22 December 1988, a court found in favour of Gasté, and he won recognition as the sole creator of the song, gaining seven-eighths of all royalties, with Albert receiving the remainder for his lyrics contribution.

== Personal life and death ==
Gasté discovered and helped launched the career of French singer and actress Line Renaud in 1945. They married in 1950.

He died at home, at Rueil-Malmaison, close to Paris on 8 January 1995.

== Selected compositions ==
- 1941: "Avec son Ukulélé" (for Jacques Pills)
- 1941: "Le Chant du Gardian" (for Tino Rossi)
- 1943: "Elle Etait Swing" (for Jacques Pills)
- 1943: "L'âme au Diable" (for Léo Marjane)
- 1943: "Sainte-Madeleine" (for Léo Marjane)
- 1944: "Domingo" (for Lucienne Delyle)
- 1945: "Le Petit Chaperon Rouge" (for Lisette Jambel)
- 1945: "Quand un Cow-boy" (for Georges Guétary)
- 1945: "Le Rythme Américain" (for Lily Fayol)
- 1945: "Ce n'était pas Original" (for Jacqueline François)
- 1945: "Le Porte Bonheur, Chica Chica" (for Jacques Hélian)
- 1945: "Un Oiseau Chante" (for Gisèle Pascal)
- 1945: "Luna Park" (for Yves Montand)
- 1945: "Battling Jo" (for Yves Montand)
- 1947: "Au Chili" (for Jacques Hélian)
- 1958: "Mon Coeur au Portugal" (recorded by several artists)

He also composed several songs for Line Renaud, including "Nous Deux", "Le Complet Gris", "Si J'avais la Chance", "Autant en Emporte le Vent", and "Ma cabane au Canada", which won the Grand Prix du Disque from Académy Charles Cros in 1949.

== Selected filmography ==
- The Island of Love (1944)
- We Are Not Married (1946)
- Sweet Madness (1951)
- Love in the Vineyard (1952)
- The Porter from Maxim's (1953)
- Madelon (1955)
- Burning Fuse (1957)
- Mademoiselle and Her Gang (1957)
- The Indestructible (1959)

== See also ==
- Bébés à gogo (film 1956)
