= Polka Album =

Compilation album by Bobby Vinton
- Released: 1981
- Genre: Pop
- Label: Tapestry
- Producer: Bob Morgan

Bobby Vinton chronology
My Song (1980)	Polka Album (1981)	Bobby Vinton's Greatest Hits (1981)

Polka Album is a collection of Polka songs recorded by Bobby Vinton, released in 1981. It is an edited version of his studio album Party Music – 20 Hits.

== Track listing ==
=== Side 1 ===
1. Ob-La-Di, Ob-La-Da - (John Lennon, Paul McCartney) - 2:33
2. Just Because - (Bob Shelton, Joe Shelton, Sydney Robin) - 2:13
3. You Are My Sunshine - (Jimmie Davis, Charles Mitchell) - 2:29
4. Tic-Tock Polka - (S. Guski, R.J. Martino, Gaetana Lama) - 2:07
5. Strike Up the Band for Love - (Bobby Vinton, Gene Allan) - 2:19
6. Paloma Blanca - (Hans Bouwens) - 3:17

=== Side 2 ===
1. Pennsylvania Polka - (Lester Lee, Zeke Manners) - 1:55
2. Too Fat Polka - (R.A. MacLean, Arthur Richardson) - 2:28
3. Hoop-Dee-Doo - (Frank Loesser, Milton DeLugg) - 1:55
4. That's Amoré - (Jack Brooks, Harry Warren) - 2:32
5. Don't Let My Mary Go Around - (Bobby Vinton, Gene Allan) - 2:22
6. Polka Memories Medley (Polka Doll/That's My Family Tree/I Love to Dance the Polka/Moja Dziewczyna Myje Nogi/Memories of Old/Love Is a Melody That Lasts Forever) - (original lyrics and adaptation by Bobby Vinton) - 4:53

== Album credits ==
- Produced by Bob Morgan for Rexford Productions, Inc.
- Engineering by Ron Malo
