= Mr. Lonely =

Mr. Lonely may refer to:

- "Mr. Lonely" (Bobby Vinton song), 1964
  - Mr. Lonely (Bobby Vinton album), 1964
  - Mr. Lonely: His Greatest Songs Today, 1991 compilation album by Bobby Vinton
- "Mr. Lonely" (Deborah Cox song), 2002
- "Lonely" (Akon song), 2005
- "911 / Mr. Lonely", 2017 song by Tyler, the Creator
- "Mr. Lonely" (Midland song), 2019
- Mister Lonely, a 2007 film
- Mr. Lonely (Mark Medlock album), 2007
