= Ballads of Love =

Compilation album by Bobby Vinton
- Released: 1985
- Genre: Pop
- Label: Heartland

Bobby Vinton chronology
The Best of Bobby Vinton (1985)	Ballads of Love (1985)	Santa Must Be Polish (1987)

Ballads of Love is a 10-track collection of previously recorded songs by Bobby Vinton; it was released in 1985 by Heartland Music, which had previously released The Best of Bobby Vinton that same year. This collection contains six songs that Vinton recorded for ABC Records ("Feelings," "Paloma Blanca," "Beer Barrel Polka," "Help Me Make It Through the Night", "And I Love You So" and "The Way We Were") one for Tapestry Records ("To All the Girls I've Loved Before"), and one for Ahed Records ("Medley"). The track of two covers of "You'll Never Know," and "Because of You"are re-recordings and first appeared on this LP.

== Track listing ==
Side One
No.	Title	Length
1.	"Feelings"
2.	"To All the Girls I Love"
3.	"Paloma Blanca"
4.	"The Way We Were"
5.	"And I Love You So"

Side Two
No.	Title	Length
1.	"Medley: It's All in the Game, Twilight Time, To Each His Own, When I Fall in Love, I'll Be Seeing You"
2.	"Beer Barrel Polka"
3.	"You'll Never Know"
4.	"Because of You"
5.	"Help Me Make It Through the Night"

== Album credits ==
- All selections courtesy of Rex Ford Productions, Inc.
- Special thanks to Bobby Vinton, Joseph G. Zynczak, and Alan Bernhard
