= Mr. Lonely: His Greatest Songs Today =

Compilation album by Bobby Vinton
- Released: January 15, 1991
- Genre: Pop
- Label: Curb

Bobby Vinton chronology
Great Songs of Christmas (1990)	Mr. Lonely: His Greatest Songs Today (1991)	Greatest Polka Hits of All Time (1991)

Mr. Lonely: His Greatest Songs Today is a collection of previously recorded songs by Bobby Vinton for Curb Records. The first five tracks might be misleading to people of the baby boomer generation, as they are not the singles that Vinton had during the 1960s and the year of 1974 but re-recordings that Vinton made for Curb. For this collection, five songs were taken from Vinton's self-explanatory album and four from his album Timeless. Re-recorded versions of "Mr. Lonely" and "Roses Are Red" make their first album appearance on this collection.

== Track listing ==
No.	Title	Writer(s)	Length
1.	"Mr. Lonely (Letter to a Soldier)"	Bobby Vinton, Gene Allen	2:43
2.	"Blue Velvet"	Bernie Wayne, Lee Morris	4:25
3.	"Roses Are Red"	Paul Evans, Al Byron	3:46
4.	"Melody of Love"	Bobby Vinton, Henry Mayer	3:12
5.	"Blue on Blue"	Hal David, Burt Bacharach	3:09
6.	"I've Always Loved You"	Bobby Vinton, Gene Allen	3:42
7.	"This Time I Know It's Real"	Norman Sallitt	3:46
8.	"The Last Rose"	C.F. House	3:16
9.	"It's Been One of Those Days"	Chester Lester, Tim DuBois, Mike Seals	3:30
10.	"How Old Do You Get"	Peter McCann, Chip Young	3:00
11.	"What Did You Do With Your Old 45's"	Pam Hanna, George Pickard	3:55

== Album credits ==
- "Mr. Lonely (Letter to a Soldier)" and "Blue Velvet" produced by: Michael Lloyd
- "Roses Are Red" produced by: Bob Gaudio
- "Melody of Love" and "It's Been One of Those Days" produced by: Bobby Vinton and Michael Lloyd
- "Blue on Blue," "I've Always Loved You," and "This Time I Know It's Real" produced by: Bobby Vinton
- "The Last Rose" produced by: Peter Drake and Michael Lloyd
- "How Old Do You Get" and "What Did You Do With Your Old 45's" produced by: Jerry Kennedy
- Art direction/Design: Neuman, Walker & Associates
