= Mike Brant =

Israeli singer and songwriter (1947–1975)

Mike Brant מייק בראנט
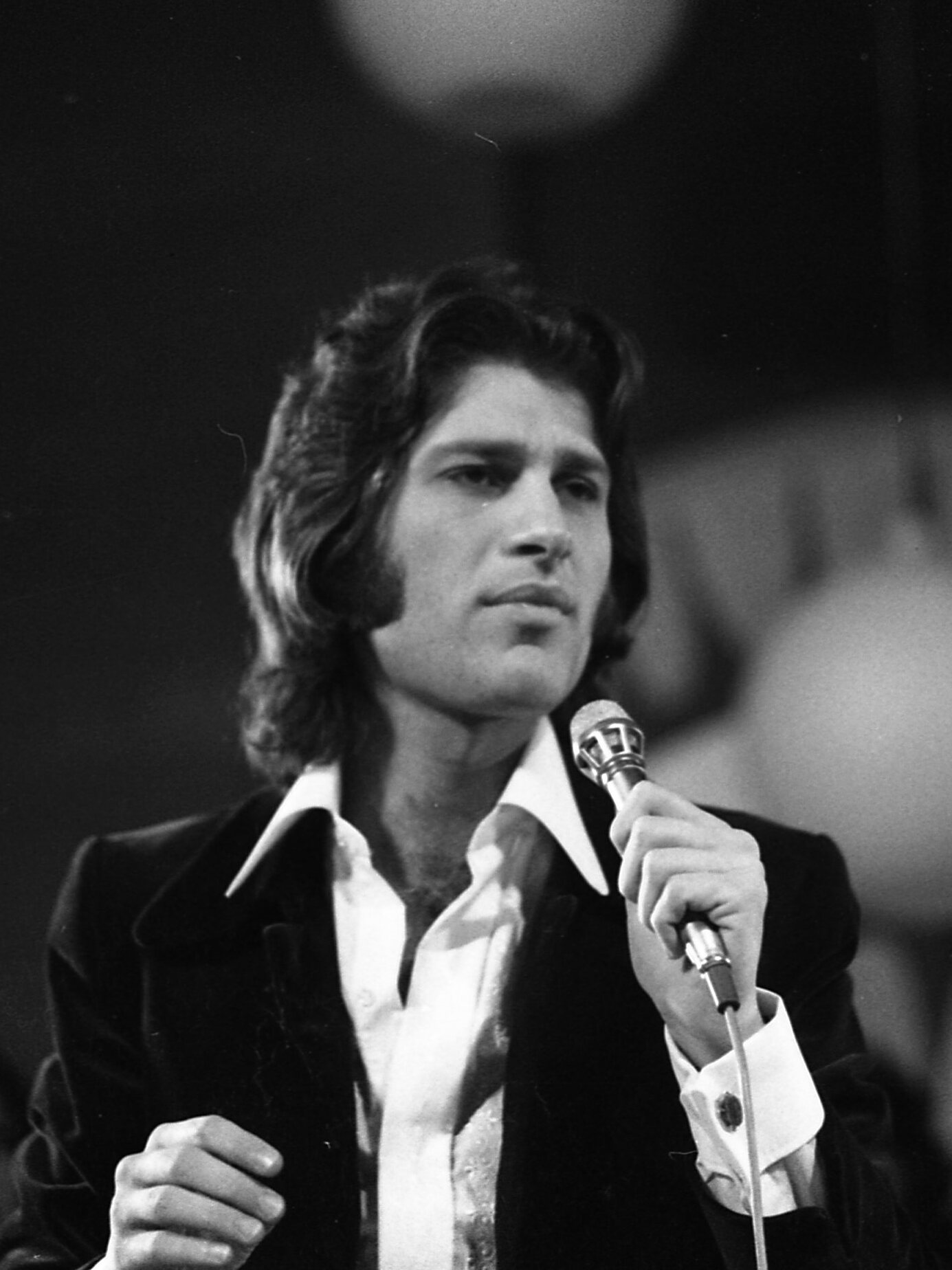
- Mike Brant in 1972

Background information
- Born: Moshe Michael Brand; 1 February 1947; Famagusta, Cyprus
- Died: 25 April 1975 (aged 28) Paris, France
- Genre: Pop • Pop Rock • Blue Eyed Soul
- Occupation: Singer
- Instrument: Vocals
- Years active: 1969–1975
- Labels: EMI; NMC
- Website: mikebrant.com

Mike Brant (born Moshe Michael Brand, Hebrew: משה מיכאל ברנד; 1 February 1947 – 25 April 1975) was an Israeli singer and songwriter who achieved fame after moving to France. His most successful hit was Laisse-moi t'aimer (Let Me Love You). He was known for his vocal range going from baritone to high tenor and also a very high and powerful falsetto. Brant died by suicide at the height of his career by jumping from a window of an apartment in Paris.

In a career spanning five years, Mike Brant sold around 15 million records, mostly in France.

== Early life ==
Mike Brant's Jewish parents were from Poland. His mother, Bronia Rosenberg, originally from Łódź, was a survivor of the Auschwitz concentration camp. His father, Fishel Brand, from Biłgoraj, had been a resistance fighter during World War II, and was 20 years his wife's senior. His parents married following the war, and they applied to emigrate to British Mandatory Palestine, but were initially denied permission by the British authorities. They attempted to reach Mandatory Palestine by sea on an Aliyah Bet ship which was intercepted by the British, and were sent to a British internment camp for illegal Jewish immigrants at Famagusta, Cyprus. Mike was born in Cyprus on 1 February 1947. In September 1947, eight months before Israeli independence, the family arrived in Mandatory Palestine after being included in a British quota for Jewish immigration. They initially settled in kibbutz Gvat but soon moved to Haifa, where Mike grew up. In 1950, his younger brother Zvi was born.

Mike Brant did not start speaking until six years of age. During his childhood, he loved to sing and dreamed of being a famous musician. Some of his early musical exposure came while attending synagogue, where he was exposed to music through prayers and religious hymns. He told his family and friends that when he grew up he'd be "a star... or a tramp!" He joined his school's choir at age 11, becoming the only boy to do so. He did not integrate well in school, and at age 13 moved to kibbutz Gesher as a boarder, where he studied and worked in agriculture for two years before returning to his family home in Haifa, claiming that life on the kibbutz did not suit him. He subsequently worked in a variety of casual jobs, including as a guard at the Clandestine Immigration and Naval Museum. He also took drama lessons at the Haifa Theater.

== Musical career ==
When he was 17, Moshe Brand joined his brother's band, "The Chocolates", as lead singer. The band performed at parties and cafés in Haifa and Tel Aviv, and moved on to nightclubs in hotels. At age 18, he was not drafted into the Israel Defense Forces for the usual three-year period of military service expected of most Israeli Jewish men after having been granted a medical exemption due to having undergone surgery for a stomach ulcer at age 15. He had hoped to serve as a singer in a military ensemble. He carried on his musical career, and sang in English and French despite knowing only Hebrew. In 1965, he changed his name from Moshe to Mike because it sounded more international. At age 19, he was discovered by the Israeli impresario Yonatan Karmon and left The Chocolates to join Karmon's dance troupe. He toured internationally with Karmon's troupe, participating in shows in the United States, South Africa, and Australia, performing as Michael Sela. His repertoire included Israeli and French songs as well as some American songs, especially by Frank Sinatra. He also gave performances mimicking Charlie Chaplin and Laurel and Hardy. After two years, he left Karmon's troupe and returned to Israel. He performed as a solo artist at the Tel Aviv Hilton and gave shows abroad.

In May 1969, Brant performed at the Baccara Club at the Hilton Hotel in Tehran, Iran. A young French singer, Sylvie Vartan, also on the bill, was impressed and urged him to come to Paris. Brant arrived on 9 July 1969. It took ten days to find Vartan but eventually she introduced him to the producer Jean Renard, who had turned Johnny Hallyday into a star. Under Renard's guidance, he changed his surname from Brand to Brant, and recorded his biggest hit, "Laisse-moi t'aimer" ("Let Me Love You"). The song was a success at the Midem music festival in January 1970. "Laisse-moi t'aimer" sold 50,000 copies in two weeks.

=== Success ===
Brant represented France in a radio contest broadcast all over Europe and in Israel. His song, sponsored by Radio Luxembourg, was "Mais dans la lumière" ("But in the Light"). He won. He continued to release hits: "Qui saura" ("Who Knows"), "L'amour c'est ça, l'amour c'est toi" (written by Paul Korda/Robert Talar), "C’est ma prière" ("That's My Prayer"), "Un grand bonheur" ("A Great Joy") and "Parce que je t'aime plus que moi" ("Because I Love You More Than Myself"). His first album, "Disque d'Or" ("Gold Record") sold millions. Brant took a song written and composed by his friend Mike Tchaban/Tashban "Why do I love you? Why do I need you?" but French radio stations would not air it because it was in English. In April 1971, Brant made his first and only (pre-recorded) appearance on British television, as a guest star in an episode of Nana Mouskouri's BBC Two series.

In February 1971, Brant was seriously injured in a traffic accident, sustaining serious skull fractures and undergoing a long recovery period. The accident received media attention. That year, he gave concerts in Israel, and performed a new song Erev Tov (Good Evening), written together with Nachum Heiman and some collaboration with Moshe/Michael Tchaban's melodic subject of some musical composition. During his concert tour in Israel, he was accompanied by Israeli singer Yaffa Yarkoni. During the Yom Kippur War in 1973, he performed for front-line Israeli soldiers.

== Suicide attempts and death ==
By 1973, he was giving 250 concerts a year, some attended by 6,000–10,000 people. This went on for two years. He suffered from depression and loneliness, and from the Second Generation Syndrome (family history of the Holocaust), and would alternate, sometimes enjoying life and at other times slipping back into depression. On 22 November 1974, he attempted suicide, jumping out the window of his manager's hotel room in Geneva. He suffered fractures but survived. He cut the number of performances and concentrated on another album, Dis-lui. (Note: Dis-lui means "Tell Her", with the titular track on the album being a French cover of the Morris Albert song "Feelings".) In January 1975, he released two singles, "Qui pourra lui dire" and "Elle a gardé ses yeux d'enfant". (Note: Written by Richard Seff and Michel Jourdan.)

On 25 April 1975, the day his new single "Dis-lui" was released, (Note: Brant's song "Dis-lui" was released in advance of his later, posthumous May 1976 compilation album by the same title which it was included in.) Brant leapt to his death from an apartment located at rue Erlanger in Paris. He was 28.

Mike Brant was buried in Haifa.

== In popular culture ==
Mike Brant has been sampled by rapper Havoc of the group Mobb Deep, for his track "Live It Up". It was sampled also by RZA of Wu-Tang Clan. Rapper Eminem sampled Brant's song "Mais dans la lumière" ("But in the Light") in his track "Crack a Bottle" released by him, Dr. Dre and 50 Cent.

Comedian Dany Boon lampooned Mike Brant in his show Waïka by singing his song "Laisse-moi t'aimer" suspended by a rope.

=== Film ===
In 2014, it was reported that French producer Alain Goldman and Israeli director Eytan Fox were developing a new film about Brant's life. The Israeli actor Omer Dror was cast to play Brant, with Fox explaining: “I really believe in Omer. He has a lot in common with Mike Brant. Omer is handsome and tall like Mike, and he has that rare star quality. He is modest and genuine. Although he’s young and inexperienced, he’s hungry and hard working, and I believe he will surprise the world with this film.” However, the project has been delayed since the announcement.

=== Reportage and documentaries ===
- In April 1998, a documentary was released Laisse-moi t'aimer: Dmaot Shel Malachim (Tears of Angels). It was a French-Israeli co-production.
- Another documentary, Mike Brant: Laisse-moi t'aimer was prepared by Erez Laufer in 2003.
- Journalist Jean-Pierre Ray made a critical exposure reportage about the affair titled "La nuit des deux couteaux". It was broadcast on French television TF1 on 4 May 2004 thirty years after Brant's death based on the supposed findings of the criminal squad of the SRPJ (service régional de la police judiciare) of Marseille. This prompted Jean-Michel Jacquemin and Fabien Baron mentioned critically in the reportage to launch a defamation lawsuit against Ray and TF1 at the Chambre de la Presse at the "Tribunal de grande instance de Paris" winning the case by a court judgement rendered on 16 November 2005.
- In 2006, journalist Charles Villeneuve prepared another reportage about the case in the programme Le droit de savoir: Faits divers shedding more light on the affair based on interviews with his relatives in Israel, many close to him or his entourage in France.
- In 2008, yet another documentary was released on him Un jour, un destin : Mike Brant, l'icône brisée. It was presented by Laurent Delahousse and broadcast on France 2.

=== Books and biographies about Mike Brant ===
(by chronological order)

Books about Mike Brant

- Hubert and Georges Baumann, La Vraie Vie de Mike Brant, preface by Claude François, éditions Star System, Paris, 1975 (The Baummans were part of Mike Brant's team);
- Fabienne Roche, Mike Brant: Le Prix de la gloire, éd. Verso, 1989;
- Michel Jourdan, Mike Brant. Il n’a pas eu le temps..., TF1 Musique, Paris, 1995;
- Yona Brant, Mike Brant, éd. Vade Retro, Paris, 1997 (with a CD);
- Fabien Lecœuvre et Gilles Lhote, Mike Brant inédit, preface of Zvi Brant, éd. Michel Lafon, Paris, 2000;
- Jacques Pessis, Mike Brant, collection «Les lumières du music-hall», éd. Vade Retro, Paris, 2002;
- Olivier Lebleu, Mike Brant : La Voix du sacrifice, Publibook, Paris, 2002;
- Fabien Lecœuvre, Mike Brant : L'Idole foudroyée, La Lagune, Paris, 2005;
- Armelle Leroy, Mike Brant : Biographie, preface by Yona Brant, Flammarion, Paris, 2005;
- Zvi Brant, Yona Brant and Fabien Lecoeuvre, Mike Brant dans la lumière, Le Marque-pages, Paris, 2009;
- Alain-Guy Aknin, Mike Brant : Le Chant du désespoir, Alphée, Monaco, 2010.

Books partially about Mike Brant

- Jacques Mazeau, Les Destins brisés de la chanson, France-Loisirs, Paris, 1997;
- Fabien Lecœuvre et Gilles Lhote, Génération 70 : 70 idoles des années 70, Michel Lafon, Paris, 2001;
- Jean Renard, Que je t’aime... la vie, Le Marque-pages, Paris, 2003.

=== Amaury Vassili chante Mike Brant (album) ===
On 27 October 2014, the French singer Amaury Vassili released a tribute album to Mike Brant entitled Amaury Vassili chante Mike Brant (meaning Amaury Vassili sings Mike Brant). The album was set to coincide with the 39th anniversary of Mike Brant's death in 1975.

The album in Warner Music entered at number 8 in SNEP French Albums Chart in its first week of release. It also charted at number 17 on the Belgian French (Wallonia) Ultratop Albums Chart. The album was in two formats: An ordinary album and a Collectors Edition that included a number of instrumental arrangements of Mike Brant songs. The album contains "Où que tu sois", which was composed by Brant but never released by him.

=== Play ===
In 2008, the stage play "Mike", which was based on Mike Brant's life, opened at the Beit Lessin Theater in Tel Aviv.

== Discography ==
=== Albums ===
Title	Album details	Peak chart positions
Title	Album details	FRA
Mike Brant	Released: 1970; Label: CBS	—
Toutes les couleurs	Released: November 1974; Label: Polydor	1
"—" denotes releases that did not chart or were not released in that territory.

=== Compilation albums ===
Title	Album details	Peak chart positions		
Title	Album details	BE (WA)	FRA	QUE
L'album d'or	Released: December 1972; Label: CBS	—	3	—
Les grands succès de Mike Brant	Released: January 1974; Label: Gamma; Quebec-only release	—	—	11
L'album d'or vol. 2	Released: 1974; Label: CBS	—	—	—
Album souvenir	Released: July 1975; Label: Sonopresse	—	2	—
Dis-lui	Released: May 1976; Label: Polydir	—	3	—
En plein cœur de ta jeunesse	Released: 1980; Label: Polydor	—	—	—
Succès...	Released: 1985; Label: Polydor	—	—	—
15e Anniversaire	Released: May 1990; Label: EMI Pathé-Marconi	—	3	—
20ème Anniversaire	Released: March 1995; Label: EMI France	2	1	—
Laisse-moi t'aimer – Le meilleur de Mike Brant	Release date: 14 April 2000; Label: EMI	1	—	22
L'essentiel	Release date: August 2000; Label: EMI	—	76	—
Qui saura	Release date: April 2005; Label: EMI	20	—	—
Forever	Release date: November 2006; Label: EMI	25	—	—
The Best Of	Release date: 3 April 2009; Label: EMI	39	—	—
Éternel	Release date: 23 April 2010; Label: EMI	—	88	—
Laisse-moi chanter!	Release date: 29 March 2013; Label: EMI	36	111	—
L'inoubliable	Release date: 31 October 2014; Label: Warner Music	194	31	—
Un grand bonheur – Best Of	Release date: 25 May 2018; Label: Warner Music	149	85	—
Anthologie	Release date: 5 June 2020; Label: Warner Music	119	178	—
"—" denotes releases that did not chart or were not released in that territory.

=== Singles ===
Name	Year	Peak chart positions					
Name	Year	ISR	BE (WA)	FRA	GER	QUE	SWI
"Laisse moi t'aimer"	1970	1	14	1	—	1	—
"Cuore di bambina" (Italy-only release)	1970	—	—	—	—	—	—
"Un grand bonheur"	1970	—	43	67	—	—	—
"Mais dans la lumière"	1970	1	2	8	34	—	—
"Nous irons à Sligo"	1971	—	42	44	—	—	—
"A corps perdu"	1971	1	32	—	—	—	—
"La fille à aimer"	1971	4	—	35	—	19	—
"Qui saura"	1972	—	13	1	—	4	—
"C'est ma prière"	1972	2	1	1	—	23	2
"Rien qu'une larme"	1973	3	1	1	—	1	—
"Das ist mein Lied" (Germany-only release)	1973	—	—	—	—	—	—
"Tout donné tout repris"	1973	2	1	1	—	1	—
"Viens ce soir"	1974	5	8	3	—	16	—
"C'est comme ça que je t'aime"	1974	—	13	9	—	—	—
"On se retrouve par hasard"	1974	—	16	7	—	—	—
"Qui pourra te dire"	1974	—	14	1	—	20	—
"Dis-lui"	1975	1	1	1	—	24	—
"Donne un peu de toi"	1976	1	21	6	—	24	—
"My Way"	1976	—	—	—	—	—	—
"—" denotes releases that did not chart or were not released in that territory.
