= Heart of Hearts =

Studio album by Bobby Vinton
- Released: July 1975
- Genre: Pop
- Label: ABC
- Producer: Bob Morgan

Bobby Vinton chronology
Bobby Vinton Sings the Golden Decade of Love (1975)	Heart of Hearts (1975)	The Bobby Vinton Show (1975)

Heart of Hearts is Bobby Vinton's twenty-sixth studio album and his second studio album for ABC Records. It was released in 1975. "Beer Barrel Polka" is the album's most successful single, peaking at # 5 on the Adult Contemporary Chart. A second single was "Wooden Heart" a #23 Adult Contemporary hit with partial Polish lyrics. Other notable tracks include Morris Albert's hit "Feelings" and Vinton's own composition "Adios Amigo" which was a big country hit for Marty Robbins.

== Track listing ==
Side A

1. "Lovely Lady" (Riccardi, Shannon) - 3:18
2. "Feelings" (Morris Albert) - 3:38
3. "I Won't Give Up" (Baldan Bambo, Piccoli, Altman) - 3:24
4. "Why Can't I Get Over You" (Bobby Vinton, Gene Allen) - 2:09
5. "Adios Amigo" (Ray Girado, Bobby Vinton) - 3:18
6. "Wooden Heart" (Bert Kaempfert, Kay Twomey, Fred Wise, Ben Weisman) - 2:23

Side B

1. "You've Got Your Momma's Eyes" (Flax, Lambert) - 3:39
2. "My Song" (Danny Janssen, Bobby Hart) - 2:31
3. "Charlie" (Burt Bacharach, Robert Russell) - 3:38
4. "Polka Pose" (Bobby Vinton) - 2:36
5. "Beer Barrel Polka" (Lew Brown, Wladimir A. Timm, Jaromír Vejvoda) - 2:32

== Personnel ==
- Arrangers: Joe Reisman, Al Capps, Mike Melvoin, Burt Bacharach
- Engineers: Tommy Vicari, Armin Steiner, Ray Gerhart
- Studios: Sound Lab, A&M
- Photography: Eddie Sanderson
- Lettering: Bob Simmons
- Art Direction: Martin Donald

== Charts ==
Album - Billboard (North America)

Year	Chart	Position
1975	The Billboard 200	108

Singles - Billboard (North America)

Year	Single	Chart	Position
1974	"Beer Barrel Polka"	The Billboard Hot 100	33
1974	"Beer Barrel Polka"	Adult Contemporary	5
