= Clandestine Immigration and Naval Museum =

Museum in Haifa, Israel

Coordinates: 32°49′48″N 34°58′17″E

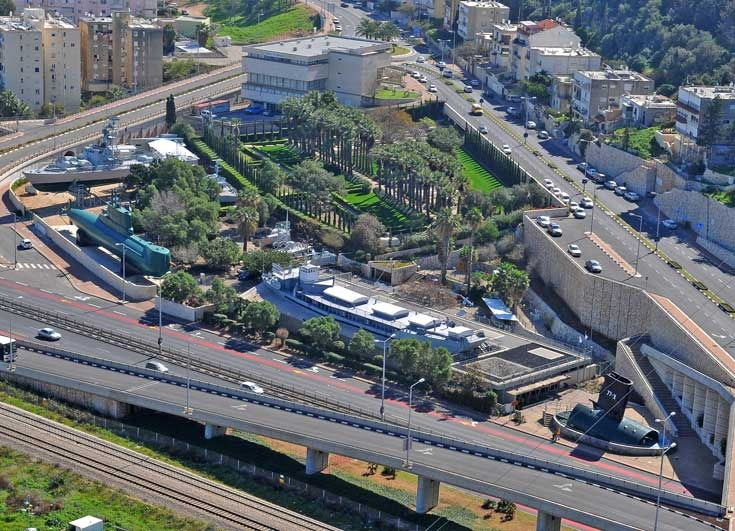
The Israeli National Maritime Museum (top) and the Clandestine Immigration and Naval Museum (bottom)

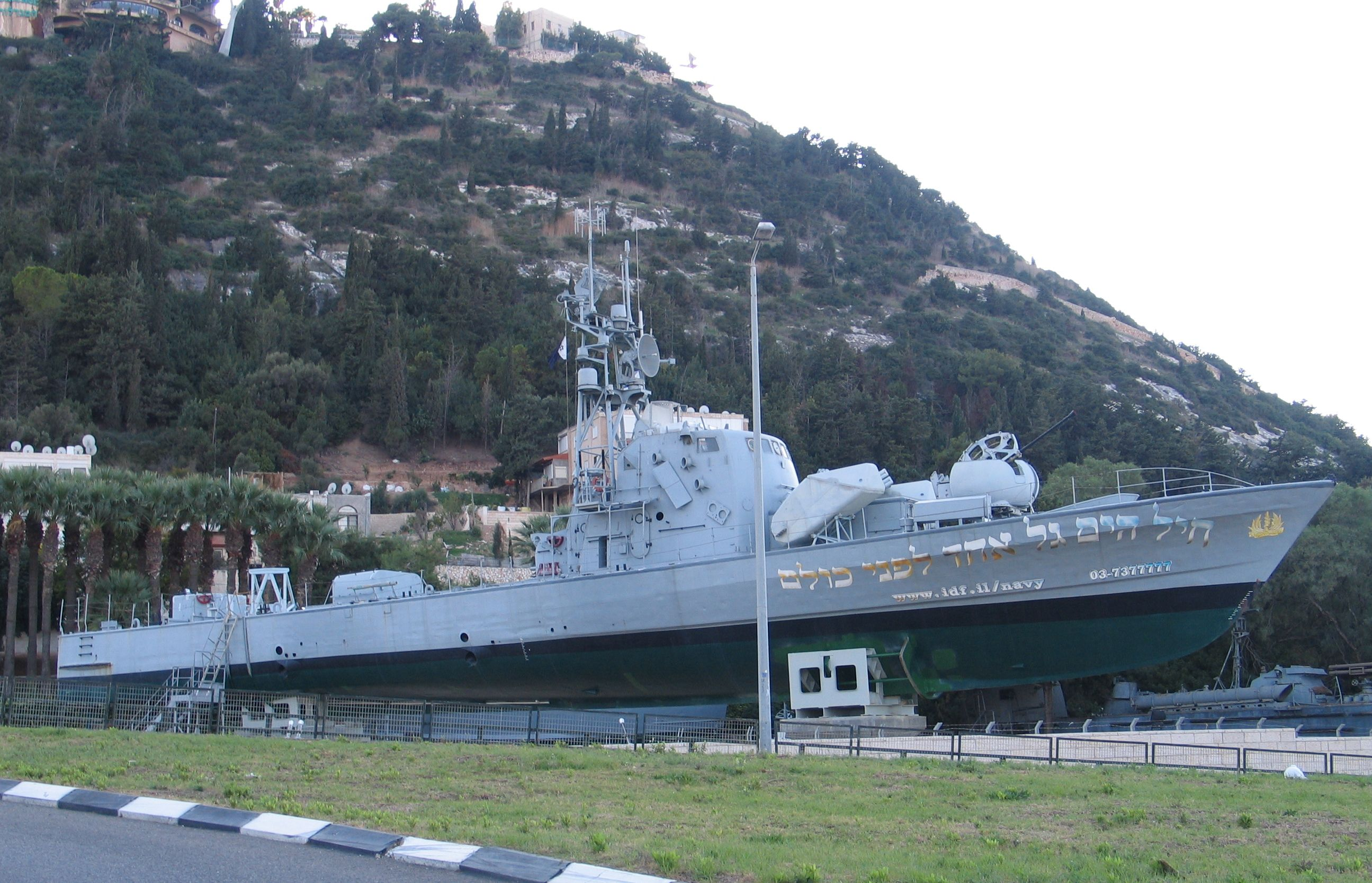
INS Mivtach, retired ship on permanent display at museum.

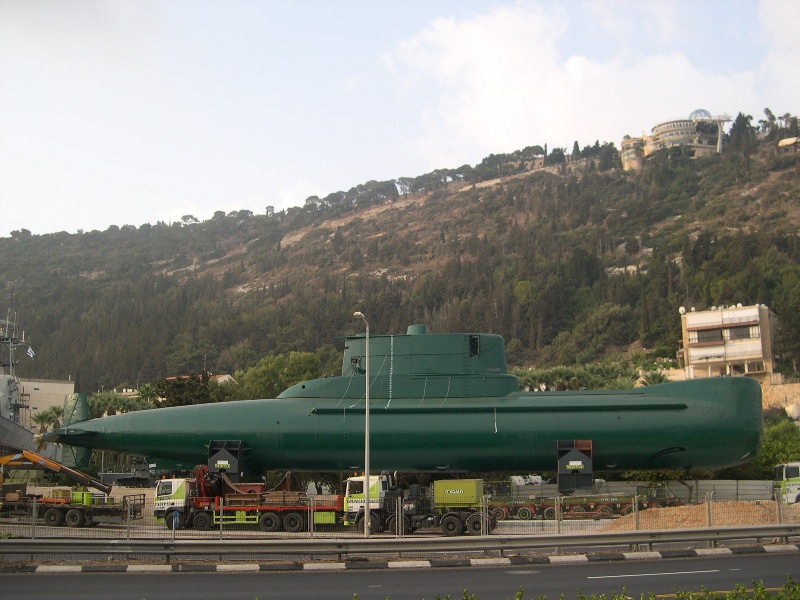
INS Gal, retired submarine on permanent display at museum.

The Clandestine Immigration and Naval Museum (Hebrew: מוזיאון ההעפלה וחיל הים ע"ש דוד הכהן) is a technical history museum located in Haifa, Israel.

The museum covers the maritime history of Israel – from clandestine immigration during the British Mandate for Palestine through the history of the Israeli navy since its inception.

The museum is named after David HaCohen, one of the leaders of the Jewish Yishuv. It was established by Colonel Yoske Coral and opened to the public in 1969. The museum is run by the Israeli Ministry of Defense. It stands next to the Israeli National Maritime Museum, dedicated to maritime history and archaeology.

== Exhibits ==
Remnants of the INS Dakar, an Israeli submarine that disappeared on its voyage to Israel in 1968 and whose wreckage was located in 1999 after several decades of searches, are on display at the museum. The following vessels are on display:

- INS Mivtach, a decommissioned Sa'ar 2-class missile boat.
- INS Gal, a retired Gal-class submarine.
- INS Af Al Pi Chen, a clandestine immigration ship, built as a Royal Navy Mark 2 Tank Landing Craft in World War II.
- INS Dabur, the first Dabur-class patrol boat.
- A P 4-class torpedo boat, captured from Egypt in 1973.
- Remnants of MTB-203, the motor torpedo boat involved in the 1967 USS Liberty incident.
- One of the three lifeboats launched by the USS Liberty during the USS Liberty incident.

== See also ==
- List of museums in Israel
