= Sweet Loving Man =

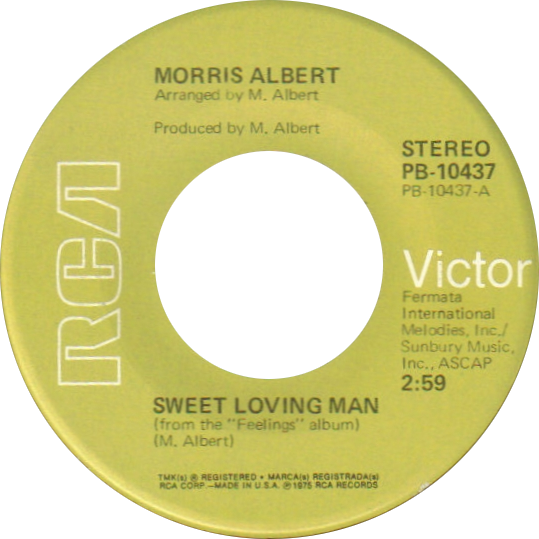
- Side-A label of US vinyl single

Single by Morris Albert

from the album Feelings
- B-side: "Christine"
- Released: December 1975
- Genre: Soft rock
- Length: 2:59 (single); 3:45 (album)
- Label: RCA Victor
- Songwriter: Morris Albert
- Producer: Morris Albert

Morris Albert singles chronology
"Feelings" (1975)	"Sweet Loving Man" (1975)	"She's My Girl" (1976)

"Sweet Loving Man" is a song by Brazilian singer Morris Albert. It was the follow-up to his international hit song, "Feelings" from his 1975 LP of the same name.

During the winter of 1976, "Sweet Loving Man" peaked at number 93 on the Billboard Hot 100 and number 15 on the Adult Contemporary chart in the United States. It also charted very similarly in Canada.

== Chart history ==
Chart (1975–76)	Peak position
Canada RPM Top Singles	83
Canada RPM Adult Contemporary	17
U.S. Billboard Hot 100	93
U.S. Billboard Easy Listening	15
U.S. Cash Box Top 100	85
