= Too Fat Polka =

1947 popular song written by Ross MacLean and Arthur Richardson

Single by Arthur Godfrey
- Released: 1947
- Songwriters: Ross MacLean, Arthur Richardson
- Composer: Anthony Maresh

"Too Fat Polka" is a novelty song by Ross MacLean and Arthur Richardson. The song is known for its recurrent chorus, "I don't want her, you can have her, she's too fat for me."

A 1947 recording by Arthur Godfrey, with orchestra under the direction of Archie Bleyer, reached No. 1 on the Billboard charts. In 1947–8 recordings were also made by Alain Romans, The Andrews Sisters, Blue Barron, Frank Sinatra, Louis Prima, Lulu Belle and Scotty, Slim Bryant, The Starlighters, Two Ton Baker, and Vic Lewis, among others. Recordings also appeared in Polish, Norwegian, and Danish.

The song was a hit for accordionist Frankie Yankovic, appearing on Friendly Tavern Polkas (1960) and subsequent albums.

A cover was allegedly recorded by David Bowie during the Young Americans sessions.

== Other recordings ==
- Frank Curylo

ZA TŁUSTA DLA MNIE (Too Fat Polka). by: FRANK CURYLO; J. Lazarz Orchestra; MacLean;

- Charles Magnante – Charles Magnante's Polka Party (1955)
- Herb Shriner – Polka Dot Party (1959)
- Joe "Fingers" Carr and Ira Ironstrings – Together for the Last Time (1960)
- Kenny Bass – The Top Million Polka Sellers (1962)
- Lou Monte – The Mixed-Up Bull from Palermo (1964)
- The Buffalo Bills – Shut The Door! (They're Comin' Through The Window) (1965)
- Whoopee John – All-Time Old-Time Polkas, Waltzes, Schottisches
- Captain Stubby and the Buccaneers – Polkas!
- James Last – Polka-Party (1971)
- Will Glahé – The Polka King, Vol. 2 (1975)
- Bobby Vinton – Party Music – 20 Hits (1976), Polka Album (1981)
- Byron Melcher – Happiness Is...
- Those Darn Accordions – Vongole Fisarmonica (1992) [as "Too Smart Polka"]
- "Weird Al" Yankovic – Mandatory Fun (2014) [in medley "Now That's What I Call Polka!"]
