= Santa Must Be Polish =

Studio album by Bobby Vinton
- Released: October 1987
- Genre: Pop, Christmas
- Label: Tapestry Records
- Producer: Bobby Vinton, Tom Kubis

Bobby Vinton chronology
Ballads of Love (1985)	Santa Must Be Polish (1987)	Bobby Vinton (1988)

Santa Must Be Polish and Other Christmas Sounds of Today is Bobby Vinton's thirty-third studio album and his second Christmas album, released in 1987. The title track is the only original song on this album. Vinton performed "Santa Must Be Polish" at the 62nd Macy's Thanksgiving Day Parade in 1988.

== Track listing ==
Side 1

1. "Santa Must Be Polish" - (Bobby Vinton, Margie Cuthbertson) - 2:40
2. "Jingle Bells" - (transcription by Bobby Vinton) - 2:45
3. "Santa Claus Is Coming to Town" - (Haven Gillespie, J. Fred Coots) - 2:36

Side 2

1. "Deck the Halls" - (transcription by Bobby Vinton) - 2:58
2. "Silent Night" - (transcription by Bobby Vinton) - 3:31

== Album credits ==
- Produced by Bobby Vinton, Tom Kubis
- Musical arrangements: Tom Kubis
- Engineer: Hill Swimmer
- Singers: Carol Jolin, Beth Lawrence
