= The Name Is Love =

Studio album by Bobby Vinton
- Released: May 1977
- Genre: Pop
- Label: ABC
- Producer: Bob Morgan

Bobby Vinton chronology
K-Tel Presents Bobby Vinton - 20 Greatest Hits (1976)	The Name Is Love (1977)	Bobby Vinton (1978)

Professional ratings
Review scores
Source	Rating
The Encyclopedia of Popular Music	3/5 stars

The Name Is Love is an album by the American musician Bobby Vinton, released in 1977. It was his final for ABC Records. Unlike most of his albums (which consisted of only one or two of his own compositions), the majority of the material on this album was written or co-written by Vinton himself. Cover versions include "Hold Me, Thrill Me, Kiss Me" and "Only Love Can Break a Heart" (the former a hit for Mel Carter in 1965 and the latter a hit for Gene Pitney in 1962). The song "You Are Love" did not become a hit until six years later.

This album is notable in that country singer Janie Fricke performs the backing vocals. Three singles were released from the album – "Hold Me Thrill Me Kiss Me", "Only Love Can Break a Heart", and "All My Today's".

== Track listing ==
All tracks composed by Bobby Vinton; except where indicated

Side A

1. "Love Makes Everything Better" - 2:40
2. "I Remember Loving You" - 3:24
3. "Hold Me, Thrill Me, Kiss Me" - (Harry Noble) - 2:47
4. "Her Name Is Love" - (Gary Knight, Gene Allan, Bobby Vinton) - 2:26
5. "Only Love Can Break a Heart" - (Burt Bacharach, Hal David) - 2:57
6. "You Are Love" - 2:27

Side B

1. "All My Today's" - 3:06
2. "Once More with Feeling" - 2:57
3. "Baby, When It Comes to Loving You" - (D. "Scotty" Reed) - 2:23
4. "Ain't That Lovin' You" - 3:13
5. "Where Were You All of My Life" - (Bobby Vinton, Gene Allan) - 2:50

== Album credits ==
- Produced by Bob Morgan
- Arrangements by Bobby Vinton, Charlie McCoy, Bob Morgan
- String arrangements by Bill McElhiney, Bill Justis, Bergen White, Lee Holdridge
- Vocal backgrounds: The Nashville Edition
- Female vocals: Janie Fricke
- Recording engineers: Lou Bradley, Ken Laxton, Ron Reynolds, Armin Steiner
- Remix engineer: Ken Laxton
- Cover photo: Eddy Sanderson
- Back photo: Lloyd Morales
- Photo tinting: Melanie Nissen

== Charts ==
Album - Billboard (North America)

Year	Chart	Position
1977	The Billboard 200	183

Singles - Billboard (North America)

Year	Single	Chart	Position
1977	"Only Love Can Break a Heart"	The Billboard Hot 100	99
1983	"You Are Love"	Country Singles	87
