= Party Music – 20 Hits =

Studio album by Bobby Vinton
- Released: 1976
- Genre: Pop
- Length: 51:04
- Label: Ahed
- Producer: Bob Morgan

Bobby Vinton chronology
Serenades of Love (1976)	Party Music – 20 Hits (1976)	K-Tel Presents Bobby Vinton - 20 Greatest Hits (1976)

Party Music – 20 Hits (stylized as Party Music ~~ 20 Hits) is Bobby Vinton's twenty-ninth studio album, released by the Canadian label Ahed in 1976.

Bobby Vinton received a Platinum Album Award on his television show in 1977 signifying sales of one million copies. The album was sold in stores and promoted with an aggressive television advertising campaign. The album features a graphic reading "As Seen On TV" on its cover along with photos of Bobby performing on his television show. It consists of 20 danceable songs, older and newly recorded. Most of the songs are Polka songs.

== Track listing ==
1. "Ob-La-Di, Ob-La-Da" - (John Lennon, Paul McCartney) - 2:33
2. "Just Because" - (Bob Shelton, Joe Shelton, Sydney Robin) - 2:13
3. "You Are My Sunshine" - (Jimmie Davis, Charles Mitchell) - 2:29
4. "Tic-Tock Polka" - (S. Guski, R.J. Martino, Gaetana Lama) - 2:07
5. "Paloma Blanca" - (Hans Bouwens) - 3:17
6. "Don't Let My Mary Go Around" - (Bobby Vinton, Gene Allan) - 2:22
7. "That's Amoré" - (Jack Brooks, Harry Warren) - 2:32
8. "Whose Girl Are You" - (Joseph Durlak, Albert Gamse) - 2:12
9. "Strike Up the Band for Love" - (Vinton, Gene Allan) - 2:19
10. "My Melody of Love" - (Vinton, Henry Mayer) - 3:08
11. "Pennsylvania Polka" - (Lester Lee, Zeke Manners) - 1:55
12. "Too Fat Polka" - (R.A. MacLean, Arthur Richardson) - 2:28
13. "Polish and Proud" - (R. Barsukiewicz) - 2:36
14. "Strip Polka" - (Johnny Mercer) - 2:00
15. "Don't Cry Mary Jo" - (Vinton, Gene Allan) - 2:13
16. "Hoop-Dee-Doo" - (Frank Loesser, Milton DeLugg) - 1:55
17. "You Can't Be True Dear"/"I've Nothing" - (Hal Cotton, Hans Otten, Ken Griffin)/(Vinton, Robert Morgan) - 2:36
18. "The Polish Wedding Song" - (Vinton, Robert Morgan) - 3:03
19. Polka memories medley: "Polka Doll"/"That's My Family Tree"/"I Love to Dance the Polka"/"Moja Dziewczyna Myje Nogi"/"Memories of Old"/Love Is a Melody That Lasts Forever" - (original lyrics and adaptation by Vinton) - 4:53
20. "Love Is the Reason" - (Vinton) - 2:13

== Album credits ==
- Produced by Bob Morgan for Rexford Productions, Inc.
- Engineering by Ron Malo
- Art direction by John Coy
- Special thanks to Frank Marocco, Larry Muhoberac, Andra Willis, Nancy Adams Huddleston, Bobbi Kiger, Soraya Bijan, Julie Myers, Aaron Morgan, Mike Morgan, Laura Robinson, Kristin Vinton, Gerry Jedraski, Joe Zynczak
