= Landing craft tank =

Amphibious assault craft for landing tanks on beachheads

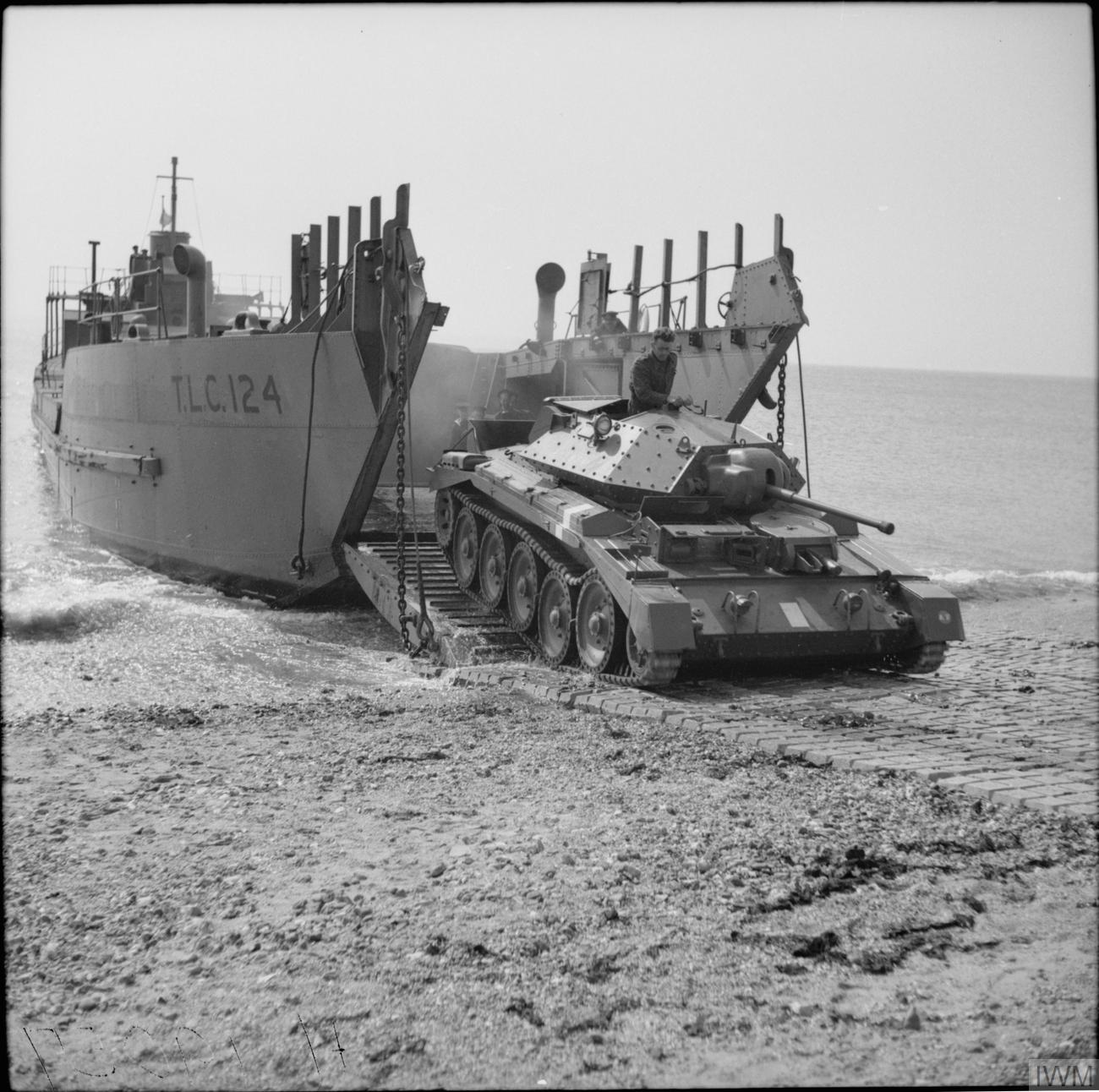
A Crusader Mk I cruiser tank driving off the tank landing craft TLC-124 during tests of a portable concrete roadway 26 April 1942

The landing craft, tank (LCT) (or tank landing craft, TLC) was an amphibious assault craft for landing tanks on beachheads. They were initially developed by the Royal Navy and later by the United States Navy during World War II in a series of versions. Initially known as the "tank landing craft" (TLC) by the British, they later adopted the U.S. nomenclature "landing craft, tank" (LCT). The United States continued to build LCTs post-war, and used them under different designations in the Korean and Vietnam Wars.

== Development ==
In 1926, the first motor landing craft (MLC1) was built by the Royal Navy. It weighed 16 tons, with a draught of 6 feet 6 inches (1.98 m), and was capable of about 6 knots (11 km/h; 6.9 mph). It was later developed into the Landing Craft, Mechanised.

Let there be built great ships which can cast upon a beach, in any weather, large numbers of the heaviest tanks.

— Winston Churchill, Memo to War Department, 1940

It was at the insistence of the British prime minister Winston Churchill in mid-1940 that the LCT was created. Its speed was 10 knots (19 km/h; 12 mph) on engines delivering about 700 hp (520 kW). Designated the LCT Mark 1, 20 were ordered in July 1940 and a further 10 in October 1940.)

Sir Rowland Baker, RCNC Constructor, was tasked with developing a family of landing craft from 1940 onwards. From 1941 he was promoted to Acting Chief Constructor and Superintendent of Landing Craft. He developed the designs for LCT(1) to LCT(4) described below.

=== Mark 1 ===
Class overview
- Name: LCT Mark 1
- Operators: Royal Navy
- Built: 1940
- Completed: 30

General characteristics
- Displacement: 372 long tons (378 t)
- Length: 152 ft (46 m)
- Beam: 29 ft (8.8 m)
- Draught: 5 ft 9 in (1.75 m) (aft)
- Propulsion: 2 × 350 hp (261 kW) Hall-Scott petrol engine, 2 shafts
- Speed: 10 knots (19 km/h; 12 mph)
- Range: 900 nmi (1,700 km; 1,000 mi)
- Capacity: 250 long tons (254 t)
- Complement: 12 (2 officers, 10 enlisted men)
- Armament: 2 × single 2-pounder pom-pom
- Armour: Wheelhouse : 15 lb; Gunshield : 20 lb

The first LCT Mark 1 was launched by Hawthorn Leslie, Hebburn on Tyne, in November 1940. It was designed to land three of the heaviest tanks (40t) then envisaged for the British Army in 2 ft 6ins of water on a 1:35 gradient beach. The load capacity was three 40-ton tanks, six 25-ton tanks or six 16-ton tanks. The forward draught was 3 feet forward and 5 feet 9 inches aft. They were designed on the same principle as a floating dock, with watertight side pontoons on each side joined by a tank deck set below the waterline. The tank deck swept up above the waterline near the bow before falling away again to the ramp. Engines were two Hall Scott Defender petrol engines of 500 hp each. The craft were arranged in four sections so they could be shipped to the Eastern Mediterranean as deck cargo on merchant ships. Thirty of these craft were ordered.

=== Mark 2 ===
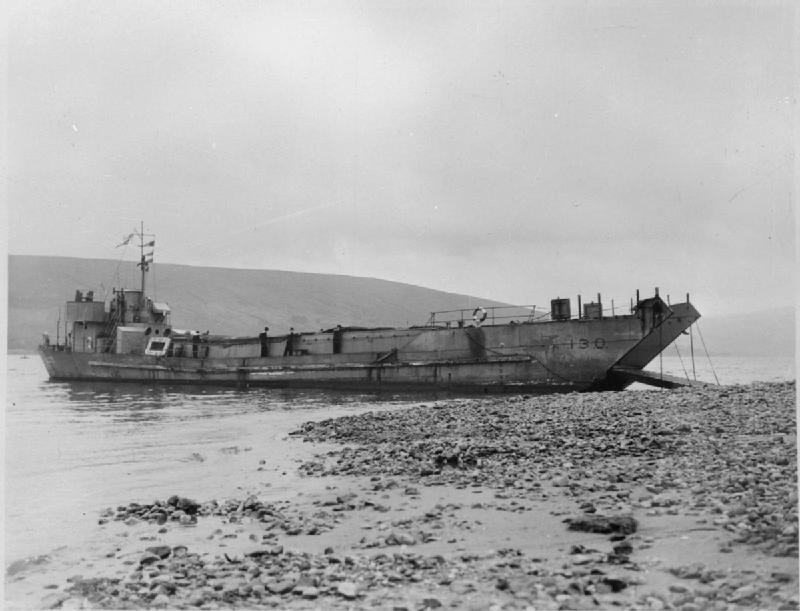

Class overview
- Name: LCT Mark 2
- Operators: Royal Navy
- Built: 1941
- Completed: 73

General characteristics
- Displacement: 590 short tons (535 t)
- Length: 159 ft 11 in (48.74 m)
- Beam: 30 ft (9.1 m)
- Draught: 3 ft 8 in (1.12 m) (forward)
- Propulsion: 3 × 460 hp (343 kW) Paxman diesels or 350 hp (261 kW) Napier Lion petrol engines, 3 shafts
- Speed: 10.5 knots (19.4 km/h; 12.1 mph)
- Range: 2,700 nmi (5,000 km)
- Capacity: 5 × 30-ton or 4 × 40-ton or 3 × 50-ton tanks or 9 trucks or 250 long tons (254 t) of cargo
- Complement: 12
- Armament: 2 × single 2-pounder pom-pom or 2 × single Bofors 40 mm guns
- Armour: Wheelhouse : 2.5 in (64 mm); Gun shield : 2 in (51 mm)

The LCT Mark 2 was longer and wider than the Mark 1, with three Napier Lion petrol engines replacing the Hall-Scotts as these were required for Coastal Forces craft. At 2,700 nautical miles (5,000 km; 3,100 mi), it had three times the range of its predecessor. Seventy-three Mk.2s were built. Increasing the beam of the Mk2 by 2 ft (0.61 m) allowed a much greater cargo capacity of lighter vehicles, where the Mk1 could only carry three Valentine tanks the Mark 2 could carry 7. The first craft were ordered in December 1940 and completed in March 1941. The craft was a little faster but three sets of running gear strained the supply position so later Mk2 had two Paxman diesel engines of 500 hp each. It was apparent now that LCTs would be required in huge numbers and ship builders would not have the capacity so structural steelwork firms were added to the program to prefabricate the structure and former shipyards reopened to assemble the craft. Like the Mark 1 the Mark 2 was assembled in four sections to facilitate shipping to Eastern Mediterranean.

=== Mark 3 ===
Class overview
- Name: LCT Mark 3
- Operators: Royal Navy; Royal Netherlands Navy
- Built: 1941
- Completed: 235

General characteristics
- Displacement: 640 long tons (650 t)
- Length: 192 ft (59 m)
- Beam: 30 ft (9.1 m)
- Draught: 3 ft 10 in (1.17 m) (forward)
- Propulsion: 2 × 460 hp (343 kW) Paxman diesels or Sterling petrol engines, 2 shafts
- Speed: 9 knots (17 km/h; 10 mph)
- Range: 2,700 nmi (5,000 km)
- Capacity: 300 long tons (305 t) of cargo
- Complement: 12
- Armament: 2 × single 2-pounder pom-pom or 2 × single Bofors 40 mm guns plus 2x single 'Fast Aerial Mines'
- Armour: Wheelhouse : 15 lb; Gun shields : 20 lb

At 192 feet (59 m) the Mark 3 was 32 feet (9.8 m) longer than the Mark 2. Although this meant extra weight, the vessel was slightly faster than the Mark 1. Two hundred and thirty-five Mk. 3s were built. The 32 ft section was added in May 1941 to the Mark 2 as a fifth building section, parallel sided. This meant the capacity went to 11 Valentines or 11 M4 Sherman medium tanks or 5 Churchill infantry tanks. 166 craft were built using two Paxman diesels, 71 were built in the winter of 1943-1944 to a slightly revised pattern using two Sterling Admiral petrol engines. These are usually referred to as Mark 3* or 7000 series as they had pennant numbers from 7000 upwards. LCT7074, currently preserved in Portsmouth, UK, is of this type.

=== Mark 4 ===
Class overview
- Name: LCT Mark 4
- Operators: Royal Navy; Royal Netherlands Navy
- Built: 1941–1942
- Completed: 865

General characteristics
- Displacement: 586 long tons (595 t)
- Length: 187 ft 3 in (57.07 m)
- Beam: 38 ft 9 in (11.81 m)
- Draught: 3 ft 8 in (1.12 m) (forward)
- Propulsion: 2 × 460 hp (343 kW) Paxman diesel engines, 2 shafts
- Speed: 8 knots (15 km/h; 9.2 mph)
- Range: 1,100 nmi (2,000 km)
- Capacity: 350 long tons (356 t) of cargo
- Complement: 12
- Armament: 2 × single Oerlikon 20 mm cannon or 2 × single Bofors 40 mm guns
- Armour: Wheelhouse : 15 lb; Gun shields : 15 lb

The Mark 4 had a much wider beam - 38 ft 9 in (11.81 m) - than the Mark 3. Built for use in the English Channel, it had a displacement of 586 tons and was powered by two 460 hp Paxman diesels. With a capacity of 350 tons, it could carry nine M4 Sherman or six Churchill tanks. Eight hundred and sixty-five Mk.4s were built, the largest LCT production in British yards. In addition to the increased beam, the Mark IV had a draught reduced to 3 ft 8in forward and 4 ft aft, allowing assault operations of much flatter beaches. The tank deck was brought above the waterline. Construction was somewhat flimsy and a number of these vessels broke their backs on uneven beaches or in heavy seas; nevertheless, the type gave excellent service. Later versions were stiffened and some made voyages to India. All of these vessels were built from prefabricated kits assembled in riverside yards, no ship builders were used in their construction.

=== Mark 5 ===
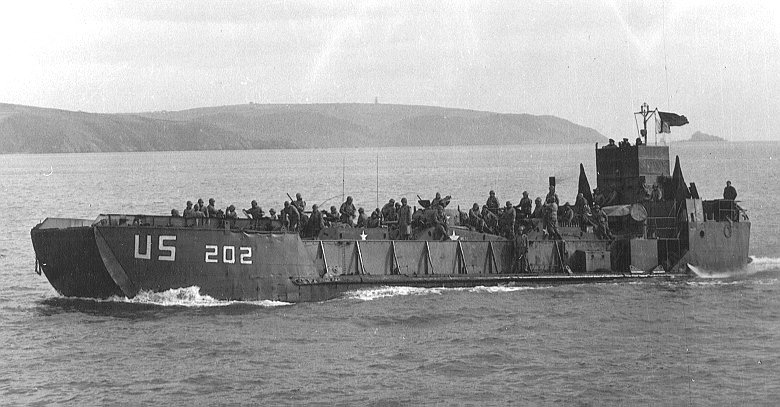
- LCT-202 off the coast of England, 1944

Class overview
- Name: LCT Mark 5
- Operators: United States Navy; Royal Navy; Polish Navy
- Built: 1942–1944
- Completed: 470

General characteristics
- Displacement: 286 short tons (259 t) (landing)
- Length: 117 ft 6 in (35.81 m)
- Beam: 32 ft (9.8 m)
- Draft: 2 ft 10 in (0.86 m) forward; 4 ft 2 in (1.27 m) aft (landing)
- Propulsion: 3 × 225 hp (168 kW) Gray marine diesels, 3 shafts
- Speed: 8 knots (15 km/h; 9.2 mph)
- Range: 700 nmi (1,300 km) at 7 kn (13 km/h)
- Capacity: 5 × 30-ton or 4 × 40-ton or 3 × 50-ton tanks or 9 trucks or 150 short tons (136 t) of cargo
- Complement: 13 (1 officer, 12 enlisted men)
- Armament: 2 × single 20 mm AA gun mounts
- Armor: Wheelhouse 2.5 in (64 mm); Gun shield 2 in (51 mm)

After World War II, eleven were used in 1950-1960 by the Polish Navy amphibious forces, with BDS, later ODS prefixes.

Production:

- New York Shipbuilding, NJ: 100
- Quincy Barge Builders, IL: 66
- Bison Shipbuilding, NY: 52
- Manitowoc, WI: 36
- Kansas City Steel, KS: 36
- Mount Vernon Bridge, OH: 36
- Decatur Iron & Steel, AL: 33
- Pidgeon Thomas Iron Works, TN: 31
- Omaha Steel, NE: 24
- Missouri Valley Bridge, KS: 20
- Darby Corporation, KS: 20
- Jones & Laughlin, PA: 16

Delivered:

- Aug 1942: 53
- Sep 1942: 111
- Oct 1942: 145
- Nov 1942: 114
- Dec 1942: 44

=== Mark 6 ===
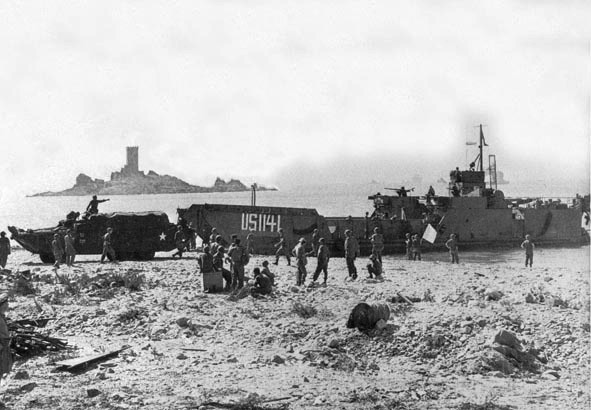
- LCT-1141 unloading at Saint-Raphaël in southern France during Operation Dragoon, August 15, 1944

Class overview
- Name: LCT Mark 6
- Operators: United States Navy; Royal Navy; Soviet Navy; Royal Thai Navy
- Built: 1943–1944
- Completed: 960

General characteristics
- Displacement: 284 short tons (258 t)
- Length: 119 ft 1 in (36.30 m)
- Beam: 32 ft 8 in (9.96 m)
- Draft: 3 ft 4 in (1.02 m) (forward)
- Propulsion: 3 × 225 hp (168 kW) Gray marine diesels, 3 shafts
- Speed: 7 knots (13 km/h; 8.1 mph)
- Range: 700 nmi (1,300 km) at 7 kn (13 km/h)
- Capacity: 150 short tons (136 t) of cargo
- Complement: 12
- Armament: 2 × single 20 mm AA gun mounts; Up to 4 × single 50 cal. machine guns
- Armor: Wheelhouse : 20 lb (9.1 kg); Gun shields : 10 lb (4.5 kg)

Nine hundred and sixty Mk.6s were built. One hundred and sixty Mk.5 and Mk.6 LCTs were provided as Lend-Lease to the Royal Navy, and a small number to the Soviet Union.

LCT(6)s were built in 3 sections, to be delivered separately to their destination. After being lowered from the delivery vessel to the water by crane, each section was floated to a suitable location where its crew would bolt the 3 sections together. Final assembly consisted of opening the crates that filled the 3 LCT sections and contained the gear that needed to be unpacked and assembled to complete the LCT(Mark 6). Provisions, water, fuel, ammunition, and armaments would then be loaded on board.

Production:

- Bison Shipbuilding, NY: 301
- Mare Island Navy Yard, CA: 216
- Pidgeon Thomas Iron Works, TN: 156
- Quincy Barge Builders, IL: 110
- Kansas City Steel, KS: 49
- Mount Vernon Bridge, OH: 46
- Missouri Valley Bridge, KS: 44
- Darby Corporation, KS: 42
- Manitowoc, WI: 1

Delivered:

- Q3 1943: 43
- Q4 1943: 126
- Q1 1944: 238
- Q2 1944: 253
- Q3 1944: 216
- Q4 1944: 88

=== Mark 7 ===
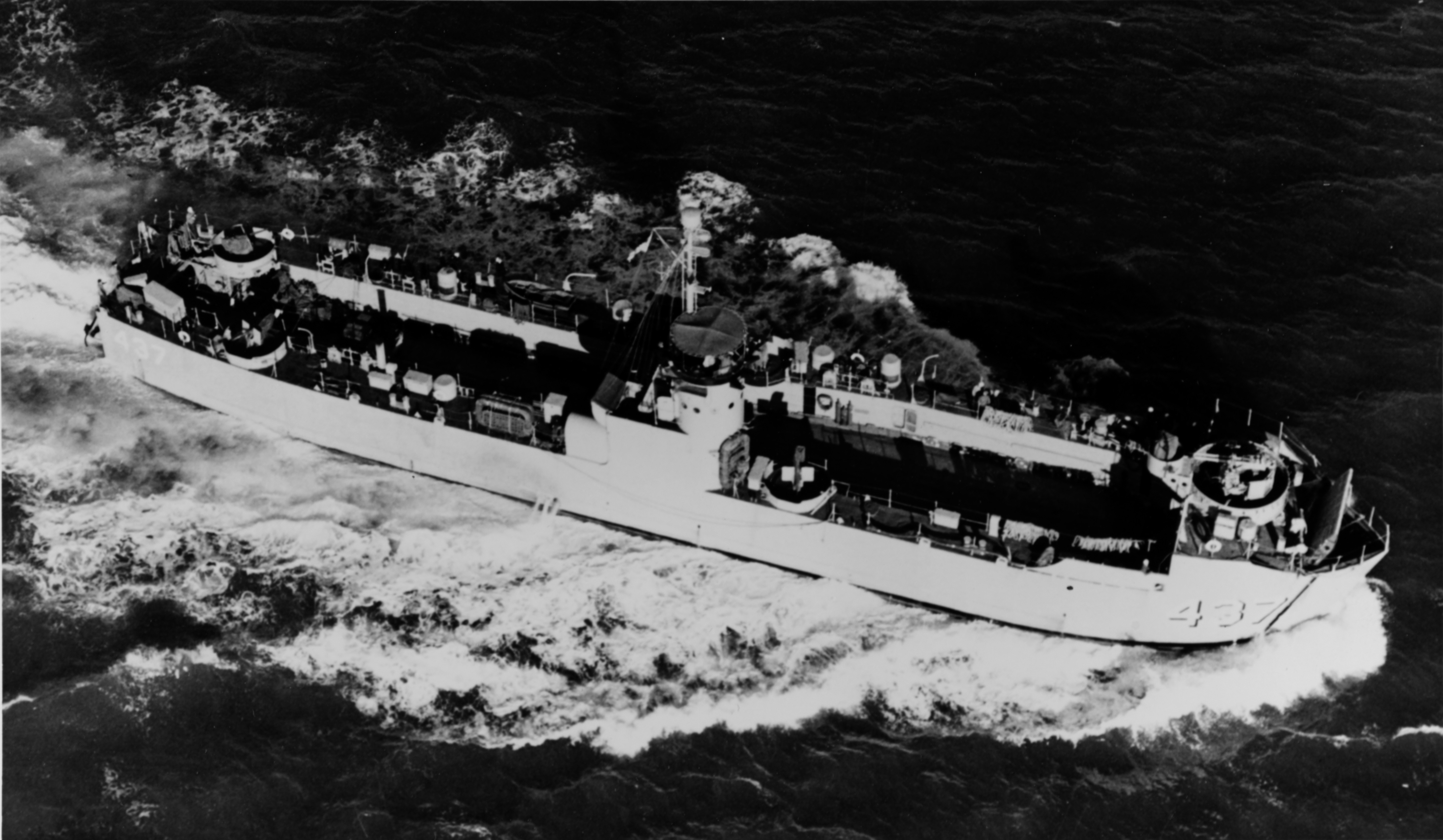
USS LSM-437 underway

The Mark 7 was an even larger LCT that could carry troops. In 1944, when the Mk.7 design reached a length of 203 feet, its designation was changed to landing ship medium (LSM). The new variant could attain speeds of up to 12 knots and saw usage in the Pacific. 558 were built.

=== Mark 8 ===
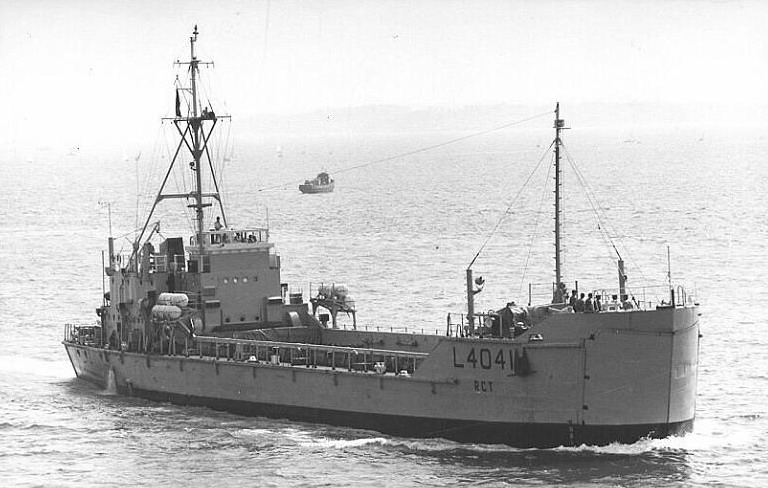
The LCT Mark 8 HMAV Abbeville (L4041)

The 225-foot LCT Mark 8, intended for service in the Pacific, was developed by the British in 1944. One hundred and eighty-six Mk.8s were ordered; however, when the war ended, most were cancelled and scrapped, or sold directly into civilian service. Only 31 entered service with the Royal Navy. Twelve were later transferred to the British Army; these were initially operated by the Royal Army Service Corps, then by the Royal Corps of Transport. Between 1958 and 1966, the other 19 ships were transferred to foreign navies or civilian companies, converted for other uses, or otherwise disposed of.

=== Mark 9 ===
An even larger LCT Mark 9 was considered in 1944, but the design was never finalised and none were built.

== Armament ==
The LCTs had a variety of weapons, with the British (40mm) QF 2-pounder "pom-pom" mounts being gradually replaced by the faster firing 20 mm Oerlikon cannon. The Bofors 40 mm was also widely used, and proved that the LCT was an excellent gunfire support vessel. Various machine guns were often mounted for self-defence from aircraft and small boats, often two to four in the .30-calibre (7.62 mm) and .50-calibre (12.7 mm), range depending on the operating country. Some models were fitted with a pair of 'Fast Aerial Mine' launchers near the bow.

== Conversions and modifications ==
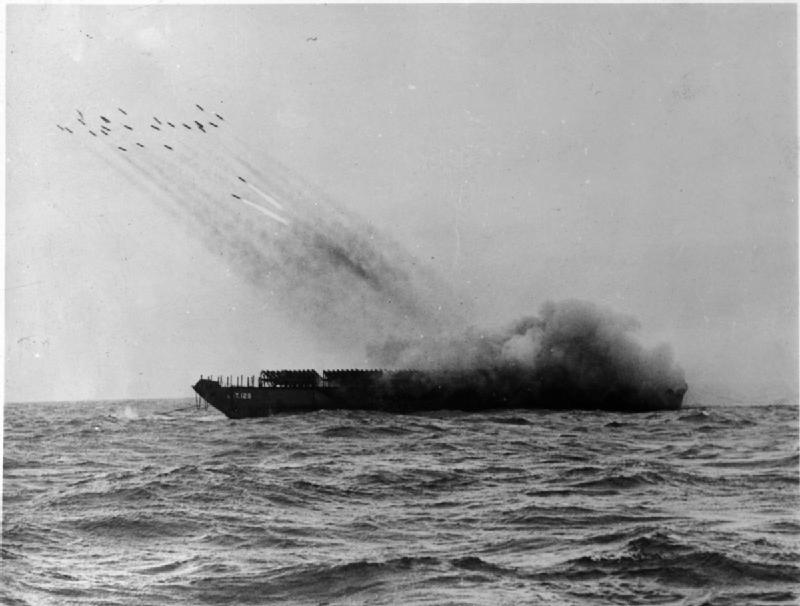
LCT(R), T125 launching a rocket salvo (1943)

Several special purpose versions were created for use during the Normandy landings. The British created the Landing Craft Tank (Rocket) (LCT(R)) modified to fire salvoes of three-inch RP-3 rockets, while the Landing Craft Guns (Large) (LCG(L)) was armed with two QF 4.7 inch guns, eight Oerlikon 20 mm AA guns and two 2-pounder pom-poms. These ships did not beach; their mission was close-in gunfire support.

The Landing Craft Tank (Armoured) (LCT(A)) was designed for use by the first wave and was equipped with additional armour protection for the crew stations and on the bows, while a heavy wooden ramp allowed the two forward tanks to fire forward. These were all U.S-built LCT Mk.5s, which had been provided under Lend-Lease to the British for Mediterranean operations, then "reverse lend-leased" back to the U.S. for the invasion.

The Landing Craft Tank (self-propelled) (LCT(SP)) carried self-propelled guns for fire support; in U.S. vessels these were 155 mm, while the British used M7 105 mm self-propelled guns and called them "Landing Craft Tank (High Explosive)" (LCT(HE)). A related variant was the British Landing Craft Tank (Concrete Buster) (LCT(CB)), which carried three British Sherman Firefly tanks fitted with the 17-pounder high velocity gun, specifically deployed to attack fortifications. Other variants included the Landing Craft Tank (Hospital) (LCT(H)) for casualty evacuation, and one LCT served as a floating bakery at Normandy.

Some LCTs with specialised weaponry were used as floating anti-aircraft batteries. These were often manned by mixed army and navy crews. Others were modified after the war for uses such as dredging.

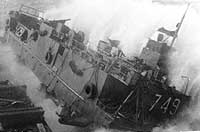
USS LCT-749 launched from on board USS LST-767, off Okinawa on 3 April 1945. The LCT had been put aboard the LST at Pearl Harbor on 10 December 1944.

== Post-war ==
Unlike most wartime landing craft, the LCT remained in active duty with the U.S. Navy after the war, and many LCTs were also loaned or given to the post-war navies of Allied countries. Between 1945 and 1946 the Royal Netherlands Navy (RNLN) loaned multiple LCT Mark 3s that were used to dump munitions. The RNLN also loaned and acquired after the Second World War several LCT Mark 4s. Some of these were stationed in the Netherlands and used to dump munitions, while others served in the Dutch East Indies and were used to transport troops and material during the Indonesian War of Independence. In April 1951 the RNLN acquired two more LCT Mark 4s that were stationed in Dutch New Guinea.

In early 1949, their designation was changed to landing ship utility (LSU), and changed again in late 1949 to landing craft utility (LCU). New landing craft (the LCU 1466, 1610, 1627, and 1646 classes) were also built to a modified Mark 5 design. Some were later reclassified during the Vietnam War as harbor utility craft (YFU) as they no longer served in an amphibious assault role, but were used in harbor support roles such as transporting goods from supply ships; however, the YFU-71 class were 11 "Skilak" lighters purchased as 'commercial off-the-shelf', and so were not originally LCUs. In April 1951 the RNLN acquired two more LCT Mark 4s that were stationed in Dutch New Guinea.

In 1964, NASA converted an LCT Mk.5 for astronaut recovery training as MV Retriever.

In modernized navies tanks are mostly transported via airlift or National Defense Reserve Fleet freighters (as during the Persian Gulf War) over long distances, but can be delivered by Landing Craft Air Cushion.

== Survivors ==
As of August 2007, at least one wartime LCT is still in use, the Mark 5 LCT-203, now renamed Outer Island, and operating on Lake Superior as a dredge and construction barge.

Until November 6, 2024, the Mark 6 LCT-1433 was also in use as a fishing/merchant vessel in Kodiak, Alaska, having been renamed Cape Douglas. The vessel sank in Chiniak Bay.

The British Mark 2, converted to LCT rocket LCT(2)(R) 147 served in the North Africa landings, then as a clandestine immigration ship post-war to Mandatory Palestine. She is now at the Clandestine Immigration and Naval Museum in Haifa, Israel.

The British Mark 3 LCT 7074 served in Normandy and was decommissioned in 1948 and presented to the Master Mariners' Club of Liverpool to be used as their club ship and renamed Landfall. Later converted to a floating nightclub, in the late 1990s the vessel was acquired by the Warship Preservation Trust and was moored at Birkenhead. In January 2006, the Trust went into liquidation and the ship was left to rot, and by April 2010 had sunk at her berth. The craft was refloated in East Float on 16 October 2014 and moved to Portsmouth for renovation. LCT 7074's renovation was completed in summer 2020 and she was moved to her new home at The D-Day Story museum in Southsea on 24 August 2020.

=== Wrecks ===
A D-Day veteran and the last known Mark 4, LCT 728, was rediscovered rotting at the Port of Poole alongside another unknown Mark 3, possibly LCT(4) 510. They were used as barges in the 1950s.

In 2020, the wreck of an LCT was discovered off Bardsey Island, Wales at a depth of 90 metres (300 ft). The vessel is thought to be LCT 326, which disappeared on 31 January 1943 in heavy weather with the loss of all 14 crew. The wreck is in two parts, separated by 130 metres (430 ft). This suggests the vessel was broken in two by the weather and the two halves remained afloat long enough to allow them to drift slightly apart.

A Mark 1 Landing Craft, A6, has been visible a few meters from the shore of the archaeological site of Phalasarna, West Crete, since it was sunk in 1941 during the Battle of Crete. The history of the vessel, partly based on interviews of the captain, John Sutton, was investigated by Michael Bendon.

== Cultural references ==
=== Literature ===
Hammond Innes's 1962 adventure novel Atlantic Fury describes the hasty late-season evacuation, on LCTs, of equipment and personnel from a military radar station on an island called Laerg (based on Hirta, in the St. Kilda Archipelago, about 40 miles (64 km) west of Scotland's Outer Hebrides), while a severe storm bears down. The author details the vulnerabilities of the LCTs in heavy seas and shifting winds, and the difficulties of landing and disembarking on the small rugged island.

== See also ==
- Amphibious warfare
- Amphibious warfare ship
- Rhino ferry
- List of U.S. Navy ships sunk or damaged in action during World War II § Landing craft, tank (LCT)

== Bibliography ==
- van Amstel, W.H.E. (1991). De schepen van de Koninklijke Marine vanaf 1945 (in Dutch). Alkmaar: De Alk. ISBN 90-6013-997-6.
- Fisher, Stephen & Hewitt, Nick (2020). "Warship Notes: Resurrecting LCT 7074". In Jordan, John (ed.). Warship 2020. Oxford, UK: Osprey. pp. 194–198. ISBN 978-1-4728-4071-4.
- Fox, Derek (March 2021). "The Resurrection of Landing Craft Tank 7074". Warship International. LVIII (1): 37–38. ISSN 0043-0374.
- Bendon, Michael (2014). The Forgotten Flotilla: The Craft of Heroes Greece, Crete and North Africa - 1941. Sydney, Australia: Michael Bendon. ISBN 9780646917085.
