= Serenades of Love =

Studio album by Bobby Vinton
- Released: 1976
- Genre: Pop
- Label: ABC
- Producer: Bob Morgan

Bobby Vinton chronology
The Bobby Vinton Show (1975)	Serenades of Love (1976)	Party Music ~~ 20 Hits (1976)

Serenades of Love was Bobby Vinton's twenty-eighth studio album and his fourth for ABC Records. It was released in 1976. Two singles came from the album: "Save Your Kisses for Me" and "Moonlight Serenade".

== Track listing ==
Side 1

1. "Save Your Kisses for Me" (Tony Hiller, Lee Sheriden, Martin Lee) – 3:18
2. "Lady of the House (Sandra)" (Enoch Anderson, Barry Manilow) – 3:47
3. "Paloma Blanca" (Hans Bouwens) – 3:17
4. "Let Me Down Easy" (M. James) – 2:53
5. "I Cross My Fingers" (Walter Kent, William Farrer) – 2:18
6. "Moonlight Serenade" (Mitchell Parish, Glenn Miller) – 3:22

Side 2

1. Waltz Medley: "Tales from Vienna Woods"/"Blue Skirt Waltz"/"You Are My One True Love" (Johann Strauss, Vaclav Blaha, Mitchell Parish, Bob Kames, R. Kaiser) – 3:39
2. "Jenny" (E. Shuman, P. Morelli) – 4:27
3. "Elise" (Grascolos, Linzer) – 2:57
4. "Penny" (S. Davis, G. Lane) – 3:18
5. "Lemondrops, Lollipops and Sunbeams" (From the 20th Century Fox Film The Duchess and the Dirtwater Fox) (Sammy Cahn, Melvin Frank, Charles Fox) – 3:31
6. "Another Without You Day" (Roger Cook, Roger Greenaway, Stephen Jameson, Matthew Doctors) – 2:52

== Album credits ==
- Produced by Bob Morgan
- Mastering engineering by Mike Reese
- Art direction by Wilkes and Klasky
- Photography by Hans Albers
- Lettering by John Cabalka
- Arranger for "Save Your Kisses for Me", "Paloma Blanca", "Jenny" and "Elise": Al Capps
- Arranger for "Lady of the House (Sandra)": Mike Melvoin
- Arrangers for "Let Me Down Easy": Bobby Vinton, Bob Morgan
- Arranger for "I Cross My Fingers": Ernie Freeman
- Arranger for "Moonlight Serenade", "Penny" and "Another Without You Day": Joe Reisman
- Arrangers for "Waltz Medley": Bobby Vinton, Ernie Freeman
- Arranger for "Lemondrops, Lollipops and Sunbeams": Charles Fox
- Engineer for "Save Your Kisses for Me": Ron Malo
- Engineer for "Lady of the House (Sandra)", "Jenny", "Elise" and "Another Without You Day": Tom Vicari
- Engineer for "Paloma Blanca": John Mills
- Engineers for "Let Me Down Easy": Lou Bradley, Tom Vicari
- Engineers for "I Cross My Fingers": Barry Keen, Mike Lietz
- Engineers for "Moonlight Serenade": John Mills, Armin Steiner
- Engineer for "Waltz Medley" and "Lemondrops, Lollipops and Sunbeams": Armin Steiner
- Engineers for "Penny": Tom Vicari, Mike Lietz
- String arranger for "Moonlight Serenade": H. B. Barnum
