= The Bobby Vinton Show (album) =

Studio album by Bobby Vinton
- Released: December 1975
- Genre: Pop
- Label: ABC
- Producer: Alan Thicke

Bobby Vinton chronology
Heart of Hearts (1975)	The Bobby Vinton Show (1975)	Serenades of Love (1976)

The Bobby Vinton Show was Bobby Vinton's twenty-seventh studio album and his third studio album for ABC Records. It was released in 1975. It features 13 songs that were sung by Vinton on his half-hour variety show of the same name. The album begins with the show's theme song, an instrumental version of Vinton's huge hit "My Melody of Love"; otherwise the remainder of the tracks are cover versions of popular songs of the 1960s and early 1970s. The series was videotaped in Canada, which is where this album was also recorded. The album was produced by Alan Thicke.

The album appeared on the Billboard 200 on December 27, 1975, staying for seven weeks and reaching a peak position of #161.

== Track listing ==
=== Side A ===
1. The Bobby Vinton Show Theme ("My Melody of Love" - Instrumental) - (Bobby Vinton, Henry Mayer, Georg Buschor) - 0:24
2. "Runaway" - (Del Shannon, Max Crook) - 1:55
3. "Killing Me Softly With His Song" - (Norman Gimbel, Charles Fox) - 4:01
4. "Build Me Up Buttercup" - (Mike d'Abo, Tony Macaulay) - 1:53
5. "Help Me Make It Through the Night" - (Kris Kristofferson) - 2:32
6. "Bad Bad Leroy Brown" - (Jim Croce) - 2:32
7. "The Way We Were" - (Marvin Hamlisch, Alan Bergman, Marilyn Bergman) - 2:43

=== Side B ===
1. "Travelin' Band" - (John Fogerty) - 2:10
2. "United We Stand" - (Tony Hiller, Peter Simmons) - 2:51
3. "(Where Do I Begin) Love Story" - (Francis Lai, Carl Sigman) - 3:39
4. "When Will I Be Loved" - (Phil Everly) - 2:01
5. "I'm Walkin'" - (Fats Domino, Dave Bartholomew) - 1:37
6. "And I Love You So" - (Don McLean) - 3:10

== Personnel ==
- Studios: Toronto Sound, Sound Labs, Inc. and ABC Recording Studios, Inc.
- Engineers: Terry Brown, John Mills, Howard Gale
- Mastering: The Mastering Lab
- Engineer: Mike Reese
- Cover photo: Shelley Cohl
- Courtesy of Shiral Productions, Ltd.
- Executive producers: Alan Blye and Chris Beard
- Producer: Alan Thicke
- Director: Mike Steele
- Musical director: Jimmy Dale

== Charts ==
Album - Billboard (North America)

Year	Chart	Position
1975	The Billboard 200	161
