= Landing Craft Tank (Rocket) =

World War II amphibious bombardment ship

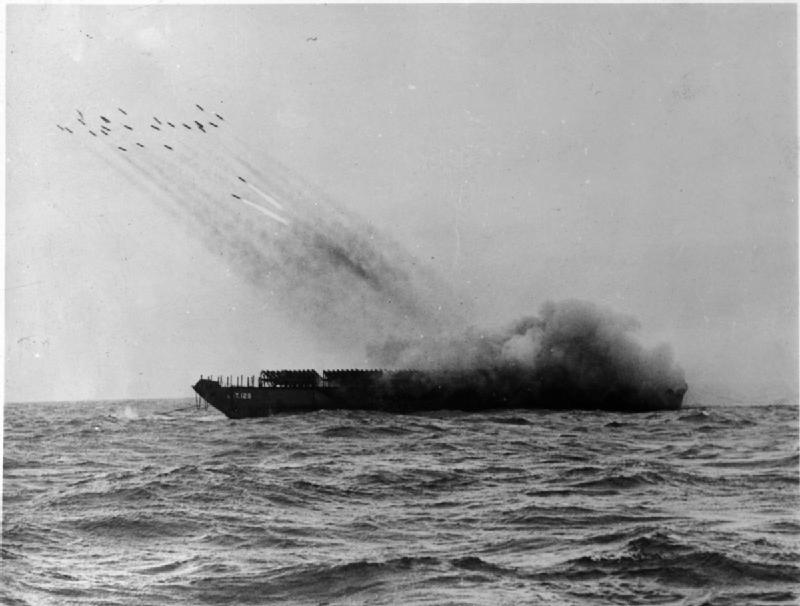
LCT(R) T125 launching a rocket salvo (1943)

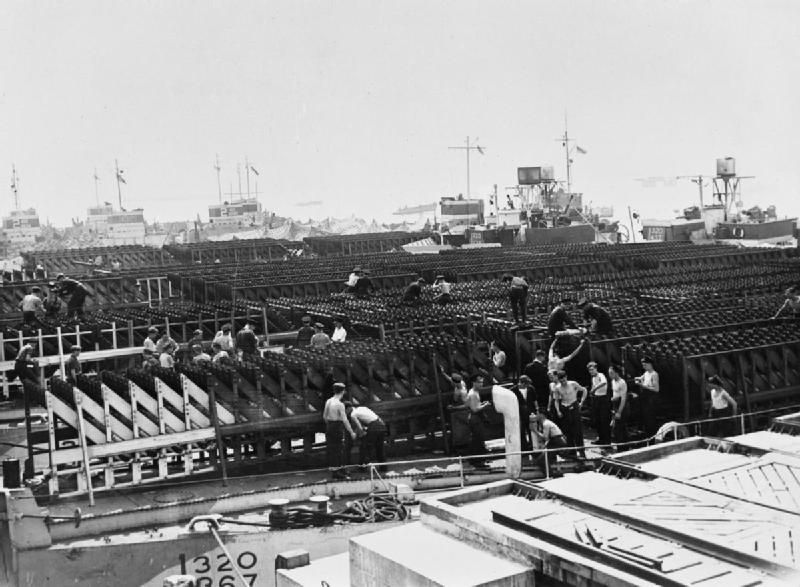
Rockets being loaded on LCT(R)s at Southampton

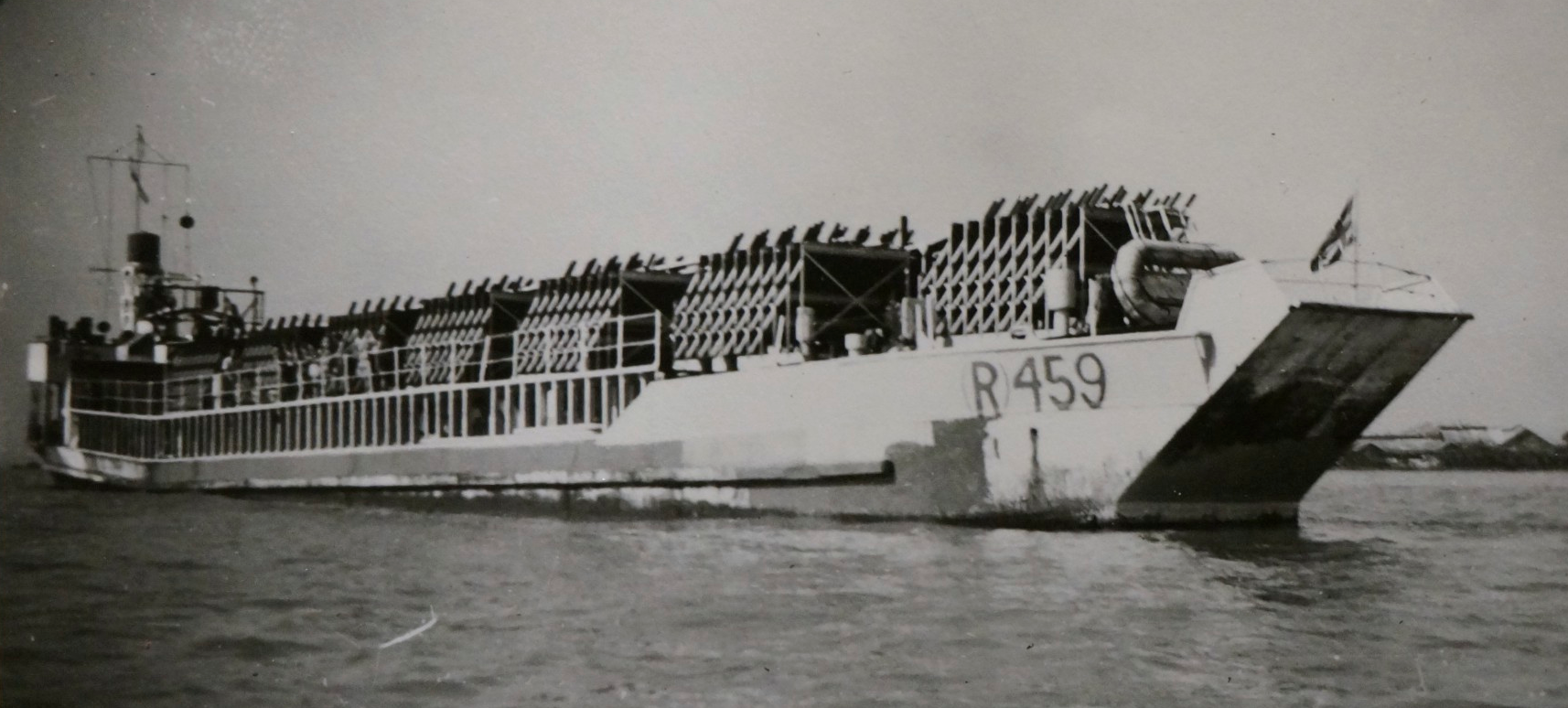
LCT (R) 459 of the US Navy

The Landing Craft Tank (Rocket) or LCT(R) was a warship developed from the British Mk.2 and Mk.3 Landing Craft Tank (LCT) during the Second World War. It was designed to saturate beaches with either 972 or 1,044 rockets prior to the landing of troops. Used by both British and U.S. forces, the craft saw service in the Normandy landings, the Mediterranean and the Far East.

== Design ==
The front loading door was welded shut and an additional deck installed above the tank storage bay to provide a mounting for the rocket launching racks. The resulting storage space below the deck (formerly the tank deck) was informally subdivided with canvas sheets to provide additional crew space. These were later updated with wooden partitions. The craft was also fitted with a Type 970 radar set whose primary use was for rangefinding, but was also successfully used for navigation. Generally propulsion was provided by Paxman diesel engines, however, other engines were also used due to limited availability of the Paxman engines. Some U.S. craft were fitted with petrol (gasoline) engines.

== Application ==
The batteries of 5-inch (130 mm) rocket projectors carried by each LCT(R) fired salvoes of rockets in rapid succession, triggered electronically by an officer located in the bridge wheelhouse. The remainder of the seventeen man crew took shelter, at the point of firing, in the below-deck space described above. The projectors were cordite-filled tubes, firing 7-pound (3.2 kg) high explosive heads. As the individual LCT(R) moved towards the beach or other target area the approximately twenty-four salvoes could in theory blanket an area of up to 1,000 yards (910 m) in depth.
