= Timeless (Bobby Vinton album) =

Studio album by Bobby Vinton
- Released: 1989
- Genre: Pop
- Label: Curb

Bobby Vinton chronology
Bobby Vinton (1988)	Timeless (1989)	Bobby Vinton's Greatest Hits (1990)

Professional ratings
Review scores
Source	Rating
Allmusic	2.5/5 stars

Timeless is the thirty-fifth studio album by Bobby Vinton, released in 1989. Two singles came from this album: "It's Been One of Those Days" and "Please Tell Her That I Said Hello".

== Track listing ==
=== Side 1 ===
1. "Please Tell Her That I Said Hello" - (Michael Shepstone, Peter Dibbens) - 3:29
2. "The Only Fire That Burns" - (Bucky Jones, Johnny Russell) - 3:23
3. "Ain't No Pleasin' You" - (Chas Hodges, Dave Peacock) - 3:57
4. "The Last Rose" - (C.F. House) - 3:16
5. "What Did You Do With Your Old 45s" - (Pam A. Hanna, George Pickard) - 3:55

=== Side 2 ===
1. "(Now and Then There's) A Fool Such as I" - (Bill Trader) - 2:34
2. "How Old Do You Get" - (Peter McCann, Chip Young) - 3:09
3. "Getting Used to Being Loved Again" - (Gene Dobbins, Glenn Ray) - 2:22
4. "It's Been One of Those Days" - (Chester Lester, Tim DuBois, Mike Seals) - 3:02
5. "I Made Love (With You Tonight)" - (Terry Skinner, J.L. Wallace, Tommy Rocco) - 3:02

== Charts ==
Singles - Billboard (United States)

Year	Single	Chart	Position
1989	"It's Been One of Those Days"	Hot Country Songs	64
1989	"Please Tell Her That I Said Hello"	Hot Country Songs	70
