= Feelings (Morris Albert song) =

1976 single by Morris Albert

- French vinyl single picture sleeve

Single by Morris Albert

from the album After We've Left Each Other
- B-side: "Christine" (original version); "Come to My Life" (Decca version); "This World Today Is a Mess" (RCA Victor version)
- Released: 1974
- Genre: Soft rock
- Length: 3:46
- Label: Copacabana (Brazil); Decca (UK); RCA Victor (Australia, U.S.); Ricordi International (Italy)
- Songwriters: Morris Albert, Louis Gasté
- Producer: Morris Albert

Morris Albert singles chronology
| "The Man from Nazareth" (1973) | "Feelings" (1974) | "Sweet Loving Man" (1975) |

"Feelings" is a song written and performed by the Brazilian singer Morris Albert. It was released in June 1974 on Albert's debut album After We've Left Each Other. The song's lyrics, recognizable by the "whoa whoa whoa" chorus, concern the singer's inability to "forget [his] feelings of love". Albert's song was hugely successful, performing very well internationally.

The lyrics, which discuss the end of a romantic relationship, were inspired by a public figure from Rio de Janeiro with whom the musician had a platonically romantic relationship. In the original version, the instrumental track was recorded by the studio group Os Carbonos, who also provided the backing vocals.

Its success in Brazil came after the song was included on the soundtrack of the telenovela Corrida do Ouro ("Gold Rush") in 1974. In the country, the single sold approximately 300,000 copies and reached number one on the Grande Parada Brasil chart, published by Amiga magazine.

Between 1974 and 1976, the song was a top ten hit on the music charts of several countries, including in the United States, where it reached number 6 on the Billboard Hot 100, number 4 in Record World magazine, and number 10 in Cash Box, as well as the United Kingdom, where it reached No. 4.

In the United States, it sold three million copies, earning Albert a gold record certified by the Recording Industry Association of America (RIAA). It also hit number 2 on the Adult Contemporary chart in the United States. At the 18th Grammy Awards held in 1976, it was nominated for two Grammy Awards (Song of the Year and Best Male Pop Vocal Performance), but won neither. Morris Albert himself was nominated for a third award - Best New Artist but the award that year went to Natalie Cole.

The song has been covered by over 300 artists, including Caetano Veloso, Julio Iglesias and Nina Simone, and has received mixed reviews over time.

In 1988, a court in the United States ruled that the song was a plagiarism of the 1957 French song "Pour Toi" ("For You") by French musician Louis Gasté, and attributed 88% of the song's credit to the latter, in addition to ordering Albert to pay $500,000 in damages after a lawsuit by the French musician. Gasté is currently credited as a co-writer of the song. Albert, while acknowledging the similarity between the two melodies, denied copying the composer and called the lawsuit a "scam".

== Composition and recording ==
At fifteen, Albert formed the musical group Hangmen with his schoolmates. After graduating with a degree in English from Columbia University in New York in 1972, he returned to Rio de Janeiro, where he compiled his work created while still in the United States and in his home country. He visited the artistic departments of major record labels in Rio, but was rejected by all of them. He then decided to launch his career independently with the release of the single "Feel the Sunshine", which, with the help of a freelance promoter, achieved moderate success on the city's main radio stations within a week. As a result, Albert was contacted by several record labels about signing a record deal, ultimately choosing Beverly, a label he had not previously approached. At that time, the label had recently broken off its partnership with Terry Winter, a Brazilian artist who had achieved popularity with the hit "Summer Holiday", and acquired the Copacabana label.

In 2004, in an interview with journalist Ricardo Miranda of IstoÉ Independente magazine, Albert revealed that the inspiration behind "Feelings" was a "platonic attraction" for a "beautiful 30-year-old carioca", "a public figure to this day".

After finalizing the song's lyrics, Albert presented it to Marcos Ficarelli, an assistant in Copacabana's international department who had recently been appointed as an internal representative for United Artists. Although he praised the song, Ficarelli also found it "a bit ordinary, the kind you've heard somewhere before".

The recording sessions for After We've Left Each Other, Albert's debut album, took place between late 1973 and mid-1974 at Estúdio Reunidos in São Paulo, under the musical production of Talmo Scaranari. The instrumental base for "Feelings" was created by the group Os Carbonos, whom Albert asked to keep "nothing heavy" due to the song's romanticism, leading the group to include only piano, double bass, and drums, the latter played with a broomstick. Os Carbonos also recorded the backing vocals.

According to the website Musicnotes, "Feelings" was composed in the key of E minor, with a moderate tempo of 88 beats per minute. The same website credits the song's musical genre as soft rock and Latin pop, although it is also sometimes cited as a romantic or cheesy ballad. Albert's vocal range on the track spans from D4 to E5.

== Release ==
After We've Left Each Other was finally released in June 1974, and although "Woman" was the first song to achieve success, "Feelings" was eventually featured on the soundtrack of the telenovela "Corrida do Ouro" two months later, which contributed to its subsequent entry into the Brazilian music charts. After traveling to Brazil to hear After We've Left Each Other for the first time, the vice president of the Latin American division of United Artists, the company that held the distribution rights to Albert's material, disapproved of the work. Soon after, the international team from Copacabana traveled to New York City to have the company's president sign the release agreement. However, at the RCA Records headquarters in the Empire State Building, president Adolpho Pino objected to this decision, opting to sign a contract to distribute the song worldwide.

A Spanish-language version titled "Sentimientos" was also released in Spanish-speaking countries.

== Reception ==
Music critic Joe Viglione, for the website AllMusic, called the song a "common ballad" that, along with "Falling Tears" and "Sweet Loving Man", are "excellent titles" by Albert. However, Australian author Colin Bowles considered the song "a crime against humanity" in his 2008 book I've Been Flushed from the Bathroom of Your Heart, in which he listed it among the 100 worst songs in the world.

The song also appears on other worst-of lists, such as Matthew Wilkening's AOL Music list, at number 83. Nevertheless, "Feelings" was nominated for two categories at the 1975 Grammy Awards, for Song of the Year and Best Male Pop Performance, but won neither. Albert also received the American Society of Composers, Authors and Publishers (ASCAP) Gold Shield award annually for seventeen consecutive times, for "Feelings" being the most-played song in the world.

== Accusations of plagiarism ==
At the time of the release, "Feelings" was solely credited to Albert himself. In 1986, French songwriter Louis Gasté sued Albert for copyright infringement, claiming that "Feelings" plagiarized the melody of his 1956 song "Pour Toi" ("For You"). Gasté won the lawsuit, upheld on appeal in 1988; they now share the credits of the song.

Recordings of the song have credited authorship variously to Albert alone, to Albert and Gasté (since the late 1980s), to Albert and Michel Jourdan (because of the French lyrics of "Dis-Lui"), and to Albert and "Kaisermann". The last of these attributions is redundant, since the singer's real name is Mauricio Alberto Kaisermann.

In his 2017 autobiography, cartoonist Mauricio de Sousa stated that the melody of "Feelings" was eerily similar to a tune used in a commercial featuring his characters, which was composed by Enio Mainardi. He claimed to have pointed this out to Albert in a live TV appearance, to which Albert responded by saying "pois é" ("indeed"). de Sousa later mentioned the Gasté lawsuit and claimed that neither he nor Mainardi had listened to "Pour Toi".

== Chart performance ==
"Feelings" quickly achieved great commercial success around the world, which hampered organizing concerts, the first of which, in Brazil, sold out. So, to promote the song worldwide, Albert decided to move to Los Angeles, where he met artists such as Frank Sinatra and Elvis Presley.

In the United States, where it received a gold record certification from the Recording Industry Association of America (RIAA), "Feelings" remained on the Hot 100 for 32 weeks, peaking at number six, per Billboard magazine on October 25, 1975. On the Adult Contemporary chart, it peaked at number two. In neighboring Canada, it was certified platinum by Music Canada for shipment of 150,000 units, while in the United Kingdom, it was certified silver by the British Phonographic Industry (BPI).

In total, around ten million copies of "Feelings" were sold worldwide, of which three million were in the United States alone and 300,000 in Brazil, making it Albert's most successful song.

The Spanish-language version of the song, called "Sentimientos", sold over 20,000 copies in its first printing and earned Albert another gold record.

== Chart history ==
=== Weekly charts ===
| Chart (1975–1976) | Peak position |
|---|---|
| Australia (Kent Music Report) | 5 |
| Belgium (Ultratop 50 Flanders) | 13 |
| Belgium (Ultratop 50 Wallonia) | 6 |
| Canada Adult Contemporary (RPM) | 3 |
| Canada Top Singles (RPM) | 18 |
| Ireland (IRMA) | 5 |
| Netherlands (Dutch Top 40) | 22 |
| Netherlands (Single Top 100) | 16 |
| New Zealand (Recorded Music NZ) | 4 |
| South Africa (Springbok) | 5 |
| UK Singles (Official Charts) | 4 |
| US Adult Contemporary (Billboard) | 2 |
| US Billboard Hot 100 | 6 |
| U.S. Cash Box Top 100 | 10 |
| West Germany (GfK) | 41 |

=== Year-end charts ===
| Chart (1974) | Rank |
|---|---|
| Brazil (ABPD) | 1 |
| Chart (1975) | Rank |
| Australia (Kent Music Report) | 88 |
| Canada | 94 |
| UK | 42 |
| U.S. Billboard Hot 100 | 46 |
| U.S. Cash Box | 23 |
| Chart (1976) | Rank |
| Australia (Kent Music Report) | 86 |

== Certifications ==
| Region | Certification | Certified units/sales |
|---|---|---|
| Canada (Music Canada) | Platinum | 200,000 |
| United Kingdom (BPI) | Silver | 250,000^{^} |
| United States (RIAA) | Gold | 1,000,000^{^} |
^{^} Shipments figures based on certification alone.

== Usage in media ==
The composition has also been featured in several films, including An Officer and a Gentleman (1982), Breakfast on Pluto (2005), and the animated short film Shrek in the Swamp Karaoke Dance Party (2001). In one episode of the television series The Muppet Show, the character Beaker sings the song.

In Brazil, in addition to being part of Corrida do Ouro, "Feelings" was also included in the soundtracks of Uga Uga, in 2000, and Chamas da Vida, in 2008.

== Other versions ==
"Feelings" has been covered by more than 300 artists, including the following:

A version by Chicago soul singer Walter Jackson reached number 93 on Billboard's pop chart in January 1977. It also peaked at number nine on the R&B/Hip-Hop Songs chart.

In 1975, Wess recorded the song for the album Wess & Dori released in Brazil (Young, 304.1052).

Andy Williams covered "Feelings" on his 1975 album The Other Side of Me.

Bobby Vinton recorded "Feelings" for his 1975 album Heart of Hearts.

Letta Mbulu covered "Feelings" on her 1976 album There's Music in the Air.

Shirley Bassey covered "Feelings" on her 1976 album, Love, Life and Feelings.

Lindsay Wagner covered "Feelings" on the episode "Bionic Beauty" of the 1976–1978 television series The Bionic Woman.

Lynn Anderson covered "Feelings" on her 1977 album Wrap Your Love All Around Your Man.

Nina Simone covered the song for a set she performed at the 1976 Montreux Jazz Festival. SOPHIE and Cecile Believe performed a truncated version inspired by Simone's cover at Elsewhere in February 2018 during a tour leading up to the release of SOPHIE's album Oil of Every Pearl's Un-Insides.

During a lecture at Chautauqua Institution, Julie Andrews stated that she considered this song too difficult to sing because it had no meaning behind it.

The Gong Show had an episode in which every contestant sang this song.

In "Switch", a 1990 Pepsi commercial, MC Hammer sings "Feelings" instead of "U Can't Touch This" when given a non-Pepsi drink. (Hammer actually lip-synched to a session singer.)

In the "Cousin Urkel" episode of Family Matters, Steve Urkel serenades Laura Winslow with the song outside her window in a tree before falling down.

The Offspring recorded a parodic cover of "Feelings" for their album Americana concerning the narrator's hatred.

Brazilian singer Gretchen recorded a dance version of "Feelings" on her 1995 album Sexy, Charme e Dance.

Caetano Veloso's version was included on the soundtracks of Começar de Novo, in 2004, and O Rebu, in 2014.

In 1975, Mexican Grupero band Los Bukis released a Spanish language version (titled "Sentimientos") on their debut album Falso Amor.

Mike Brant recorded a version in French and it reached number one on the charts in France and the Wallonia region of Belgium.

Japanese band Hi-Fi Set released a Japanese-language cover in 1977.

An instrumental version of the song was included on Ubaldo Continiello's soundtrack to the 1978 Italian film Last Feelings.

Other musicians who recorded versions of the song include Céu, Dionne Warwick, Ella Fitzgerald, George Benson, Isaac Hayes, Johnny Mathis, José Feliciano, Julio Iglesias, Paul Anka, Sammy Davis Jr., Sarah Vaughan, Tom Jones, and the orchestras of Paul Mauriat, Percy Faith, and Ray Conniff.
