= Bobby Vinton (1988 album) =

Studio album by Bobby Vinton
- Released: 1988
- Genre: Pop
- Label: Curb
- Producer: Bobby Vinton, Tom Kubis, Michael Lloyd, Mike Levitz, Mike Murphy, Howie Horowitz, Bob Morgan

Bobby Vinton chronology
Santa Must Be Polish (1987)	Bobby Vinton (1988)	Timeless (1989)

Bobby Vinton is Bobby Vinton's thirty-fourth album, released in 1988. Re-recordings of previous hits include "Sealed With a Kiss", "Blue on Blue", "Blue Velvet" and "My Melody of Love".

== Track listing ==
=== Side 1 ===
1. "Sealed With a Kiss" - (Peter Udell, Gary Geld) - 3:46
2. "Blue on Blue" - (Hal David, Burt Bacharach) - 3:03
3. "When I Was Seventeen" - (Bobby Vinton, Gene Allen) - 3:45
4. "I've Always Loved You" - (Bobby Vinton, Gene Allen) - 3:39
5. "Proud to Be an American" - (Bobby Vinton, Johnny Prill) - 3:58

=== Side 2 ===
1. "The Last Rose" - (Coweta F. House) - 3:16
2. "I Go to Pieces" - (Del Shannon) - 2:47
3. "This Time I Know It's Real" - (Norman Sallitt) - 3:47
4. "Blue Velvet" - (Bernie Wayne, Lee Morris) - 2:47
5. "My Melody of Love" - (Bobby Vinton, Henry Mayer, George Buschor) - 3:08

== Album credits ==
- Tracks 1 - 5 and 8 produced by Bobby Vinton and Tom Kubis
- Tracks 6 produced by Michael Lloyd for Mike Curb Productions and Pete Drake
- Track 7 produced by Mike Levitz, Mike Murphy and Howie Horowitz
- Track 9 and 10 produced by Bob Morgan
