= Morris Albert =

Brazilian singer and songwriter (born 1951)

- Born: Maurício Alberto Kaisermann; 7 September 1951 (age 75); Rio de Janeiro, Brazil
- Genres: Pop, soft rock
- Occupations: Singer-songwriter, musician, producer
- Instruments: Vocals, guitar, piano
- Years active: 1972–present
- Label: RCA

Maurício Alberto Kaisermann (born 7 September 1951), better known by his stage name Morris Albert, is a Brazilian singer and songwriter. He became known in more than 50 countries for his 1974 hit "Feelings", followed by "She's My Girl", and sold more than 10 million copies in Brazil.

== Early and personal life ==
Albert was born in Rio de Janeiro, Brazil. At the beginning of his musical career, he was a member of two bands, The Thunders and The Hangmen as a singer and guitarist.

Morris has five children, three daughters and two sons, and currently lives in Italy.

== Career ==
After the success of the first single "Feel the Sunshine", he recorded his debut album in 1974 under the title Feelings, which reached No. 1 in his homeland and stayed on the charts for half a year. The single "Feelings" was a soft rock hit song and made Albert a one-hit wonder. The ballad reached the top ten U.S. Billboard charts in the summer of 1975, and sold more than 1 million copies, and was awarded a gold disc by the RIAA on 13 November 1975. "Feelings" made Albert sell more than 160 million records (including singles, albums and compilations) worldwide. Also in 1975, Albert recorded the single “Leave Me”. He won 43 gold and 17 platinum albums. He also recorded another hit songs such as "She's My Girl" and "Conversation", among several other of his compositions.

With his success as a singer, he appeared on several shows like Os Trapalhões when it aired at TV Tupi, which featured musical sketches interspersed with comedy sketches. One of the most hilarious sketches was Renato Aragão's parody of the song, which he called "Filho" (Son).

The song had also been parodied for a commercial cartoon in Brazil featuring the characters from Turma da Mônica and Elefante da Cica (a food company). The parody lyrics said: "Monica... abrace o elefante, e veja num instante..." (Monica... hug the elephant, and see in an instant...).

This song was covered by many other musicians such as Elvis Presley, Frank Sinatra, Andy Williams, Dionne Warwick, Johnny Mathis, Julio Iglesias, and others.

At the 18th Grammy Awards in 1976, Feelings was nominated for Song of the Year, but the award went to Stephen Sondheim for Send in the Clowns. Morris Albert himself was nominated for Best New Artist (losing to Natalie Cole) and Best Pop Vocal Performance Male (losing to Paul Simon for the Still Crazy After All These Years album).

=== Plagiarism lawsuit ===
Albert originally claimed the song was a composition that was entirely his own, but was later sued by French songwriter Louis Gasté in 1988, for allegedly plagiarizing Gasté's 1956 song "Pour toi" (For you). Morris was defended by William Sheffield in Gasté's lawsuit. Gaste's song had been originally used in the 1957 French movie soundtrack of Le feu aux poudres.

Gasté defeated Albert in the courts, received approximately US$500,000 from Albert, and Gasté gained seven-eighths of all royalties of the song, with Albert receiving the remainder for the lyrics.

Nowadays, the song is credited to Albert and Gasté.

== Discography ==
=== Albums ===
- 1974 - After We've Left Each Other
- 1975 - En Castellano!
- 1976 - Morris Albert
- 1977 - Love and Life
- 1978 - Ubaldo Continiello, Morris Albert - Feeling Love (L'ultimo Sapore Dell'aria)
- 1979 - Once Upon a Man
- 1981 - Solitude
- 1983 - Beginnings
- 1984 - Feelings
- 1984 - Very Alive - Again
- 1987 - Back To Love
- 1990 - Feelings
- 1996 - Sentimientos
- 1999 - Lover
- 2003 - Moods
- 2004 - Cuore
- 2006 - Live & Forever
- 2011 - Feelings Of Love

=== Singles and EPs ===
- 1972 - "Feel the Sunshine"/"Good Morning Mr. Sun"
- 1973 - "The Throat"
- 1973 - "Shalom My Israel"/"The Man from Nazareth"
- 1974 - "Feelings" – US #6; US AC #2; UK #4, SA #5, AU #5, NZ #4,
- 1974 - "Sentimientos"/"Gitana"
- 1974 - "Woman"/"Where Is The Love Of The World"
- 1975 - "Leave Me"
- 1975 - "Sweet Loving Man"/"Christine" – U.S. No. 93, Easy Listening #15; Canada #83, AC #17
- 1975 - "Dime"/"Cristina"
- 1975 - "Signor Censore"/"Feelings"
- 1976 - "She's My Girl"
- 1976 - "Memories"
- 1976 - "Seras (So Nice)"/"Por Ultima Vez (If Only She'd Say)"
- 1976 - "Ella Es Mi Chica"/"Todos Aman A Alguien"
- 1976 - "Woman"/"Where Is The Love Of The World"
- 1976 - "Leave Me"/"Vieni"
- 1977 - "So Nice"
- 1977 - "Conversation"/"Mornings"
- 1977 - "Someone, Somehow"
- 1977 - "Midnight"/"Part Of Me"
- 1977 - "Morris Albert"
- 1978 - "Feeling Love"
- 1979 - "Angel Lady"/"Once Upon A Man"
- 1981 - "Manila Nights"
- 1982 - "Do You Miss Me"
- 1983 - "Feelings"
- 1983 - "I Look At The Sun"
- 1983 - "Feelings"/"Natural High"
- 1983 - "Dahil Sa Iyo"/"Because Of You"
- 2003 - "Empty View"
- 2004 - "Cuore" (with Mietta)
- Unknown - "Feelings"/"Forever"
- Unknown - "If We Believe"
- Unknown - Lisa Martine, Morris Albert, Linda Hargrove, Larry Fox – "Lisa Martine"

=== Compilations ===
- 1979 - Feelings
- 1991 - Seleção De Ouro
- 1993 - L'Album D'Or
- 1993 - Feelings
- 1998 - Feelings
- 2004 - Feelings

== See also ==
- List of one-hit wonders on the UK Singles Chart
- List of one-hit wonders in the United States
- List of performers on Top of the Pops
- I Love the '70s (U.S. TV series)
