= As Time Goes By =

As Time Goes By may refer to:

== Songs ==
- "As Time Goes By" (song), a 1931 song written by Herman Hupfeld featured in the 1942 film Casablanca
- "As Time Goes By", a 1999 song by Hiroko Shimabukuro

== Albums ==
- As Time Goes By (Harpers Bizarre album), 1976
- As Time Goes By (Duke Jordan album), 1985
- As Time Goes By (Chet Baker album), 1986
- As Time Goes By, by Andy Bey, 1991
- As Time Goes By (Bobby Vinton and George Burns album), 1992
- As Time Goes By (Bryan Ferry album), 1999
- As Time Goes By (The Carpenters album), 2001
- As Time Goes By: The Great American Songbook, Volume II, by Rod Stewart, 2003
- As Time Goes By, by Lee Soo Young, 2005
- As Time Goes By (Alfie Boe album), 2018

== Television ==
- As Time Goes By (TV series), a 1992–2005 British sitcom and 1997–1999 radio series
- "As Time Goes By" (Boy Meets World)
- "As Time Goes By" (Doctors)
- "As Time Goes By" (Kiddy Grade)
- "As Time Goes By" (M*A*S*H)
- "As Time Goes By" (Seven Days)
- "As Time Goes By" (Sliders)

== Other media ==
- As Time Goes By, a 1971 play by Mustapha Matura
- As Time Goes By (1988 film), an Australian science fiction comedy by Barry Peak
- As Time Goes By (1997 film) (Gei Diy Chun Fung), a Taiwanese documentary by Ann Hui
- As Time Goes By (novel), a 1998 novel by Michael Walsh, a sequel to the 1942 film Casablanca
