= Cinema Vox =

Cinema Vox may refer to:

- Cinema Vox (Casablanca), a former cinema in Casablanca, Morocco.
- Cinema Vox (Tangier), a former cinema in Tangier, Morocco.
