= Casablanca (film) =

1942 film by Michael Curtiz

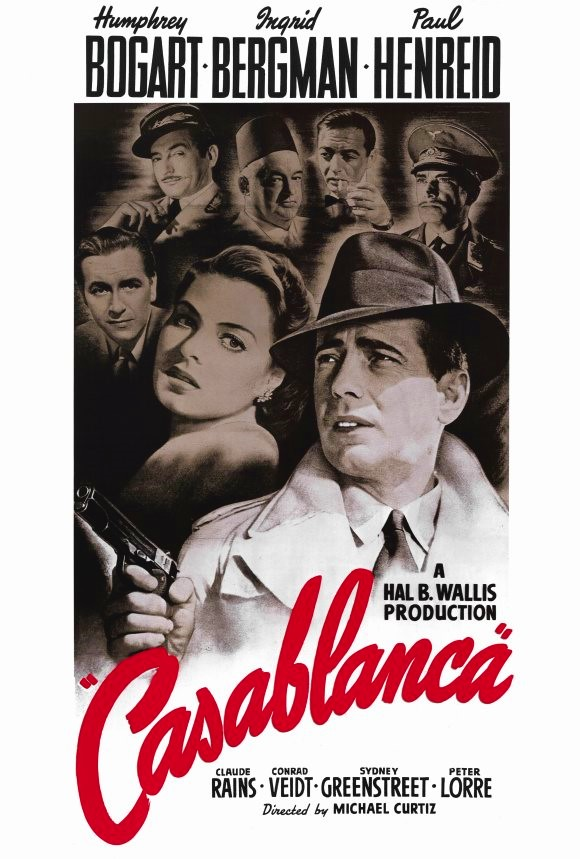
- Theatrical release poster by Bill Gold
- Directed by: Michael Curtiz
- Screenplay by: Julius J. Epstein; Philip G. Epstein; Howard Koch
- Based on: Everybody Comes to Rick's (play) by: Murray Burnett; Joan Alison
- Produced by: Hal B. Wallis
- Starring: Humphrey Bogart; Ingrid Bergman; Paul Henreid; Claude Rains; Conrad Veidt; Sydney Greenstreet; Peter Lorre
- Cinematography: Arthur Edeson
- Edited by: Owen Marks
- Music by: Max Steiner
- Color process: Black and white
- Production company: Warner Bros. Pictures, Inc.
- Distributed by: Warner Bros. Pictures, Inc.
- Release dates: November 26, 1942 (Hollywood Theatre); January 23, 1943 (United States)
- Running time: 102 minutes
- Country: United States
- Language: English
- Budget: $878,000–$1 million
- Box office: $3.7–6.9 million

Casablanca is a 1942 American romantic drama film directed by Michael Curtiz and starring Humphrey Bogart, Ingrid Bergman, and Paul Henreid. Filmed and set during World War II, it focuses on an American expatriate (Bogart) who must choose between his love for a woman (Bergman) and helping her husband (Henreid), a Czechoslovak resistance leader, escape from the Vichy-controlled city of Casablanca to continue his fight against the Nazis. The screenplay is based on Everybody Comes to Rick's, an unproduced stage play by Murray Burnett and Joan Alison. The supporting cast features Claude Rains, Conrad Veidt, Sydney Greenstreet, Peter Lorre, and Dooley Wilson.

Warner Bros. story editor Irene Diamond convinced producer Hal B. Wallis to purchase the film rights to the play in January 1942. Brothers Julius and Philip G. Epstein were initially assigned to write the script. However, despite studio resistance, they left to work on Frank Capra's Why We Fight series early in 1942. Howard Koch was assigned to the screenplay until the Epsteins returned a month later. Principal photography began on May 25, 1942, ending on August 3; the film was shot entirely at Warner Bros. Studios in Burbank, California, with the exception of one sequence at Van Nuys Airport in Los Angeles.

Although Casablanca was an A-list film with established stars and first-rate writers, no one involved with its production expected it to stand out among the many pictures produced by Hollywood yearly. Casablanca was rushed into release to take advantage of the publicity from the Allied invasion of North Africa a few weeks earlier. It had its world premiere on November 26, 1942, in New York City and was released nationally in the United States on January 23, 1943. The film was a solid, if unspectacular, success in its initial run.

Exceeding expectations, Casablanca went on to win the Academy Award for Best Picture, while Curtiz was selected as Best Director and the Epsteins and Koch were honored for Best Adapted Screenplay. Its reputation has gradually grown, to the point that its lead characters, memorable lines, and pervasive theme song have all become iconic, and it consistently ranks near the top of lists of the greatest films in history. In the inaugural class of 1989, the United States Library of Congress selected the film as one of the first for preservation in the National Film Registry for being "culturally, historically, or aesthetically significant". The film's copyright was renewed in 1970; it will enter the public domain in the US and countries with the rule of the shorter term on January 1, 2038.

Roger Ebert wrote: "If there is ever a time when they decide that some movies should be spelled with an upper-case M, Casablanca should be voted first on the list of Movies."

== Plot ==
In December 1941, American expatriate Rick Blaine owns a nightclub and gambling den in Casablanca, then in French Morocco. "Rick's Café Américain" attracts a varied clientele, including Vichy French and German officials, refugees desperate to reach the still-neutral United States, and those who prey on them. Although Rick professes to be neutral in all matters, he ran guns to Ethiopia in 1935 and fought on the Republican side in the Spanish Civil War.

Petty crook Ugarte boasts to Rick of letters of transit obtained by murdering two German couriers. The papers allow the bearers to travel freely around German-occupied Europe and to neutral Portugal. Ugarte plans to sell them at the club and persuades Rick to hold them for him; however, Ugarte is arrested by the local police under Captain Louis Renault, the unabashedly corrupt prefect of police. Ugarte is killed while in custody without revealing that Rick has the letters.

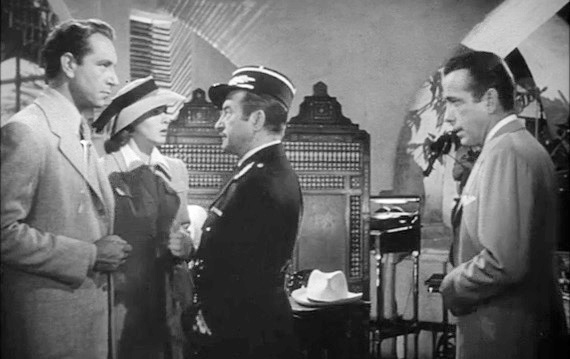
Left to right: Henreid, Bergman, Rains and Bogart

Then, the reason for Rick's cynical nature—former lover Ilsa Lund—enters his establishment. Spotting Sam, Rick's friend and house pianist, Ilsa asks him to play "As Time Goes By". Rick storms over, furious that Sam disobeyed his order to never perform that song again; he is stunned to see Ilsa. She is accompanied by her husband, Victor Laszlo, a renowned fugitive Czechoslovak Resistance leader. A flashback reveals Ilsa left Rick without explanation when the couple were planning to flee as the German army neared Paris in 1940, embittering Rick. Laszlo and Ilsa need the letters to escape, while German Major Strasser is determined to prevent their departure.

When Laszlo makes inquiries, Signor Ferrari, an underworld figure and Rick's friendly business rival, divulges his suspicion that Rick has the letters. Laszlo returns to Rick's café that night and tries to buy them. Rick refuses to sell, telling Laszlo to ask his wife why. They are interrupted when Strasser leads a group of German officers in singing "Die Wacht am Rhein". Laszlo orders the house band to play "La Marseillaise", and Rick allows it. Patriotism grips the crowd and everyone joins in, drowning out the Germans. Afterwards, Strasser has Renault close the club on the flimsy pretext that he is “shocked” at casino gambling (as an employee hands Renault his winnings).

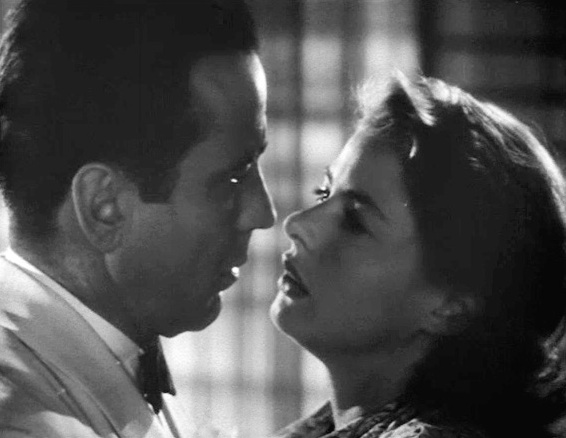
Bogart and Bergman

Later, Ilsa confronts Rick in the deserted café; when he refuses to give her the letters, she threatens him with a gun but then confesses she still loves him. She explains that when they met and fell in love in Paris, she believed her husband had been killed while attempting to escape from a concentration camp. When she learned that Laszlo was alive and in hiding, she left Rick without explanation to nurse her sick husband. Rick's bitterness dissolves. He agrees to help, letting Ilsa believe she will stay with him, while Laszlo leaves Casablanca. When Laszlo unexpectedly shows up, having narrowly escaped a police raid on a Resistance meeting, Rick has waiter Carl spirit Ilsa away. Aware of Rick's love for Ilsa, Lazlo tries to persuade him to use the letters to take her to safety.

When the police arrest Laszlo on a trumped-up charge, Rick persuades Renault to release him by promising to set Laszlo up for a much more serious crime: possession of the letters. To allay Renault's suspicions, Rick explains that he and Ilsa will use the letters to leave for America. When Renault tries to arrest Laszlo as arranged, Rick forces him at gunpoint to assist in their escape; however, Renault manages to tip off Strasser. At the last moment, Rick makes Ilsa board the plane to Lisbon with Laszlo, telling her that she would regret it if she stayed, "Maybe not today, maybe not tomorrow, but soon and for the rest of your life." Strasser drives up alone and attempts to stop the plane. He draws a gun on Rick, who shoots Strasser dead. When policemen arrive, Renault pauses, then orders them to "round up the usual suspects." He suggests to Rick that they join the Free French in Brazzaville. As they walk away into the fog, Rick says, "Louis, I think this is the beginning of a beautiful friendship."

== Cast ==
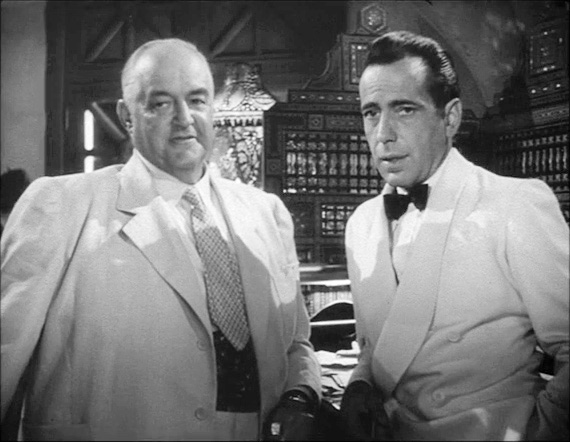
Greenstreet and Bogart

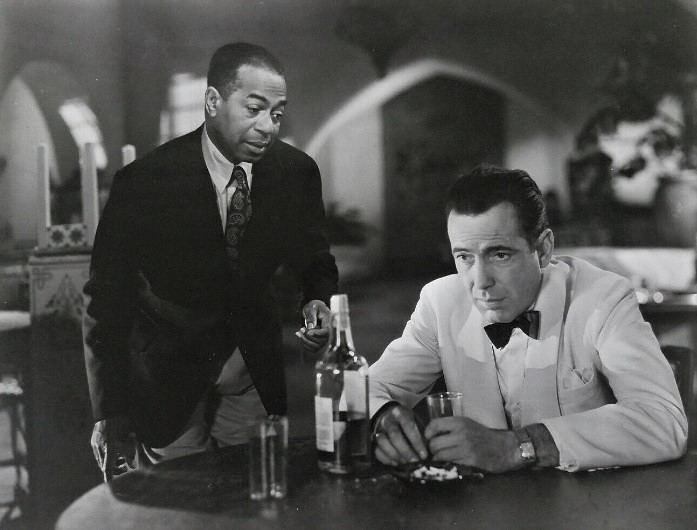
Dooley Wilson and Humphrey Bogart

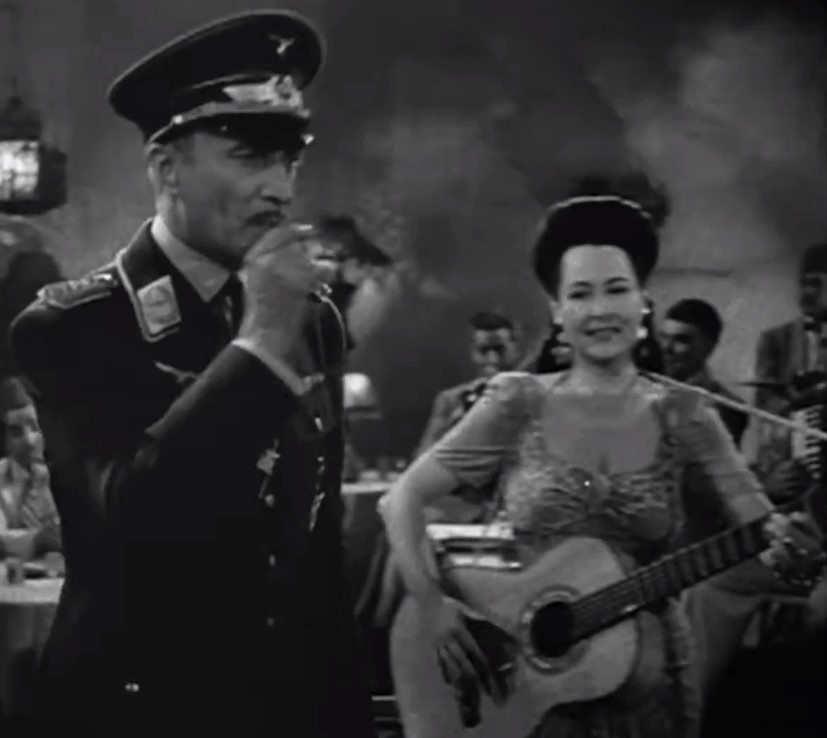
Conrad Veidt and Corinna Mura

The play's cast consisted of 16 speaking parts and several extras; the film script enlarged it to 22 speaking parts and hundreds of extras. The cast is notably international: only three of the credited actors were born in the United States (Bogart, Dooley Wilson, and Joy Page). The top-billed actors are:

- Humphrey Bogart as Rick Blaine
- Ingrid Bergman as Ilsa Lund. Bergman's official website calls Ilsa her "most famous and enduring role". The Swedish actress's Hollywood debut in Intermezzo had been well received, but her subsequent films were not major successes until Casablanca. Film critic Roger Ebert called her "luminous", and commented on her chemistry with Bogart: "she paints his face with her eyes". Other actresses considered for the role of Ilsa included Ann Sheridan, Hedy Lamarr, Luise Rainer, and Michèle Morgan. Producer Hal Wallis obtained the services of Bergman, who was contracted to David O. Selznick, by lending Olivia de Havilland in exchange.
- Paul Henreid as Victor Laszlo. Henreid, an Austrian actor who had emigrated in 1935, was reluctant to take the role (it "set [him] as a stiff forever", according to Pauline Kael), until he was promised top billing along with Bogart and Bergman. Henreid did not get on well with his fellow actors; he considered Bogart "a mediocre actor"; Bergman called Henreid a "prima donna".

The second-billed actors are:

- Claude Rains as Captain Louis Renault
- Conrad Veidt as Major Heinrich Strasser. Veidt was a refugee German actor who had fled the Nazis with his Jewish wife, but frequently played Nazis in American films. He was the highest-paid member of the cast despite his second billing. He died shortly after the film's release.
- Sydney Greenstreet as Signor Ferrari
- Peter Lorre as Signor Ugarte

Also credited are:

- Curt Bois as the pickpocket
- Leonid Kinskey as Sascha, the Russian bartender infatuated with Yvonne. Kinskey told Aljean Harmetz, author of Round Up the Usual Suspects: The Making of Casablanca, that he was cast because he was Bogart's drinking buddy. He was not the first choice for the role; he replaced Leo Mostovoy, who was deemed not funny enough.
- Madeleine Lebeau as Yvonne, Rick's soon-discarded girlfriend. Lebeau was a French refugee who had left Nazi-occupied Europe with her husband Marcel Dalio, who was a fellow Casablanca performer. She was the last surviving cast member until her death on May 1, 2016.
- Joy Page as Annina Brandel, the young Bulgarian refugee. Jack L. Warner, head of Warner Bros., was Page's stepfather. However, she landed the part without any help from him, as he did not want a family member taking up acting. Page herself only tried out for the role at the suggestion of her acting coach, viewing the part as "corny and old-fashioned", according to her son; she only changed her mind when she learned that Bergman had been cast.
- John Qualen as Berger, Laszlo's Resistance contact
- S. Z. Sakall (credited as S. K. Sakall) as Carl, the head waiter
- Dooley Wilson as Sam

Notable uncredited actors are:

- Marcel Dalio as Emil the croupier
- Helmut Dantine as Jan Brandel, the Bulgarian roulette player married to Annina Brandel
- Gregory Gaye as the German banker who is refused entry to the casino by Rick
- Torben Meyer as the Dutch banker who runs "the second largest banking house in Amsterdam"
- Corinna Mura as the guitar player who sings "Tango Delle Rose" (or "Tango de la Rosa") and later accompanies the crowd on "La Marseillaise"
- Frank Puglia as a Moroccan rug merchant
- Richard Ryen as Hauptmann (Captain) Heinze, Strasser's aide
- Dan Seymour as Abdul the doorman
- Gerald Oliver Smith as the Englishman whose wallet is stolen
- Norma Varden as the Englishwoman whose husband has his wallet stolen

Much of the emotional impact of the film, for the audience in 1942, has been attributed to the large proportion of European exiles and refugees who were extras or played minor roles (in addition to leading actors Paul Henreid, Conrad Veidt and Peter Lorre), such as Louis V. Arco, Trude Berliner, Ilka Grünig, Ludwig Stössel, Hans Heinrich von Twardowski, and Wolfgang Zilzer. A witness to the filming of the "duel of the anthems" sequence said he saw many of the actors crying and "realized that they were all real refugees". Harmetz argues that they "brought to a dozen small roles in Casablanca an understanding and a desperation that could never have come from Central Casting". Even though many were Jewish or refugees from the Nazis (or both), they were frequently cast as Nazis in various war films, because of their accents.

Jack Benny may have appeared in an unbilled cameo, as was claimed by a contemporary newspaper advertisement and in the Casablanca press book. When asked in his column "Movie Answer Man", critic Roger Ebert first replied, "It looks something like him. That's all I can say." In a later column, he responded to a follow-up commenter, "I think you're right. The Jack Benny Fan Club can feel vindicated".

== Production ==
=== Writing ===
The film was based on Murray Burnett and Joan Alison's unproduced play Everybody Comes to Rick's. The Warner Bros. story analyst who read the play, Stephen Karnot, called it (approvingly) "sophisticated hokum" and story editor Irene Diamond, who had discovered the script on a trip to New York in 1941, convinced Hal Wallis to buy the rights in January 1942 for $20,000 (equivalent to $340,000 in 2025), the most anyone in Hollywood had ever paid for an unproduced play. The project was renamed Casablanca, apparently in imitation of the 1938 hit Algiers. Casablanca also shares many narrative and thematic similarities with Algiers, which itself is a remake of the acclaimed 1937 French film Pépé le Moko, directed and co-written by Julien Duvivier.

The original play was inspired by a trip to Europe made by Murray Burnett and his wife in 1938, during which they visited Vienna shortly after the Anschluss and were affected by the antisemitism they saw. In the south of France, they went to a nightclub that had a multinational clientele, among them many exiles and refugees, and the prototype of Sam. In The Guardian, Paul Fairclough wrote that Cinema Vox in Tangier "was Africa's biggest when it opened in 1935, with 2,000 seats and a retractable roof. As Tangier was in Spanish territory, the theatre's wartime bar heaved with spies, refugees and underworld hoods, securing its place in cinematic history as the inspiration for Rick's Café in Casablanca." The scene of the singing of "La Marseillaise" in the bar is attributed by the film scholar Julian Jackson as an adaptation of a similar scene from Jean Renoir's film La Grande Illusion five years prior.

The first writers assigned to the script were twins Julius and Philip Epstein who, against the wishes of Warner Bros., left at Frank Capra's request early in 1942 to work on the Why We Fight series in Washington, D.C. While they were gone, the other credited writer, Howard Koch, was assigned; he produced thirty to forty pages. When the Epstein brothers returned after about a month, they were reassigned to Casablanca and—contrary to what Koch claimed in two published books—his work was not used. The Epstein brothers and Koch never worked in the same room at the same time during the writing of the script. In the final budget for the film, the Epsteins were paid $30,416, (equivalent to $466,755 in 2025) and Koch earned $4,200 (equivalent to $65,346 in 2025).

In the play, the Ilsa character is an American named Lois Meredith; she does not meet Laszlo until after her relationship with Rick in Paris has ended. Rick is a lawyer. The play (set entirely in the café) ends with Rick sending Lois and Laszlo to the airport. To make Rick's motivation more believable, Wallis, Curtiz, and the screenwriters decided to set the film before the attack on Pearl Harbor.

The possibility was discussed of Laszlo being killed in Casablanca, allowing Rick and Ilsa to leave together, but as Casey Robinson wrote to Wallis before filming began, the ending of the film is

set up for a swell twist when Rick sends her away on the plane with Laszlo. For now, in doing so, he is not just solving a love triangle. He is forcing the girl to live up to the idealism of her nature, forcing her to carry on with the work that in these days is far more important than the love of two little people.

It was certainly impossible for Ilsa to leave Laszlo for Rick, as the Motion Picture Production Code forbade showing a woman leaving her husband for another man. The concern was not whether Ilsa would leave with Laszlo, but how this outcome would be engineered. According to Julius Epstein, he and Philip were driving when they simultaneously came up with the idea for Renault to order the roundup of "the usual suspects", after which all the details needed for resolution of the story, including the farewell between Bergman and "a suddenly noble Bogart", were rapidly worked out.

The uncredited Casey Robinson assisted with three weeks of rewrites, including contributing the series of meetings between Rick and Ilsa in the café. Koch highlighted the political and melodramatic elements, and Curtiz seems to have favored the romantic parts, insisting on retaining the Paris flashbacks.

In a telegram to film editor Owen Marks on August 7, 1942, Wallis suggested two possible final lines of dialogue for Rick: "Louis, I might have known you'd mix your patriotism with a little larceny" or "Louis, I think this is the beginning of a beautiful friendship". Two weeks later, Wallis settled on the latter, which Bogart was recalled to dub a month after shooting had finished.

Bogart's line "Here's looking at you, kid", said four times, was not in the draft screenplays, but has been attributed to a comment he made to Bergman as she played poker with her English coach and hairdresser between takes.

Despite the many writers, the film has what Ebert describes as a "wonderfully unified and consistent" script. Koch later claimed it was the tension between his own approach and Curtiz's that had accounted for this. "Surprisingly, these disparate approaches somehow meshed, and perhaps it was partly this tug of war between Curtiz and me that gave the film a certain balance." Julius Epstein later noted the screenplay contained "more corn than in the states of Kansas and Iowa combined. But when corn works, there's nothing better".

The film ran into some trouble with Joseph Breen of the Production Code Administration (the Hollywood self-censorship body), who opposed the suggestions that Captain Renault extorted sexual favors from visa applicants, and that Rick and Ilsa had slept together. Extensive changes were made, with several lines of dialogue removed or altered. All direct references to sex were deleted; Renault's selling of visas for sex, and Rick and Ilsa's previous sexual relationship were implied elliptically rather than referenced explicitly. Also, in the original script, when Sam plays "As Time Goes By", Rick exclaims, "What the —— are you playing?" This line was altered to "Sam, I thought I told you never to play ..." to conform to Breen's objection to an implied profanity.

=== Direction ===
Wallis's first choice for director was William Wyler, but he was unavailable, so Wallis turned to his close friend Michael Curtiz. Roger Ebert has commented that in Casablanca "very few shots ...are memorable as shots", as Curtiz wanted images to express the story rather than to stand alone. He contributed relatively little to development of the plot. Casey Robinson said Curtiz "knew nothing whatever about story ...he saw it in pictures, and you supplied the stories".

Critic Andrew Sarris called the film "the most decisive exception to the auteur theory", of which Sarris was the most prominent proponent in the United States. Aljean Harmetz has responded, "...nearly every Warner Bros. picture was an exception to the auteur theory". Other critics give more credit to Curtiz. Sidney Rosenzweig, in his study of the director's work, sees the film as a typical example of Curtiz's highlighting of moral dilemmas.

Some of the second unit montages, such as the opening sequence of the refugee trail and the invasion of France, were directed by Don Siegel.

=== Filming ===
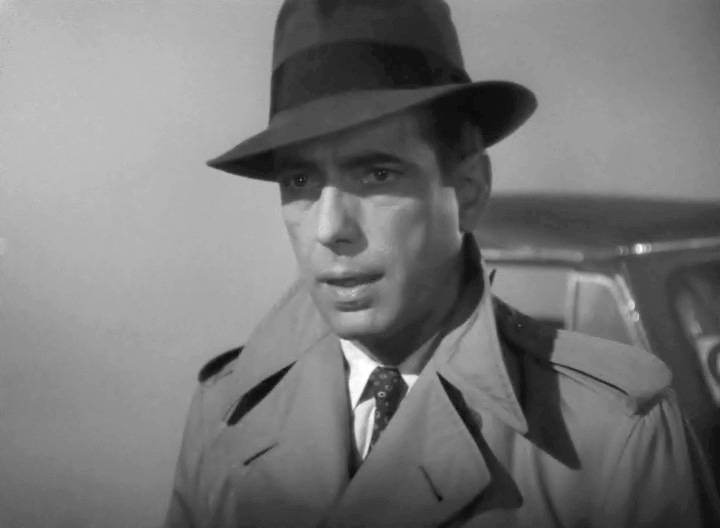
Bogart in the airport scene

Although an initial filming date was selected for April 10, 1942, delays led to production starting on May 25. Filming was completed on August 3. It went $75,000 over budget for a total cost of $1,039,000 (equivalent to $16,165,000 in 2025), above average for the time. Unusually, the film was shot in sequence, mainly because only the first half of the script was ready when filming began.

The entire picture was shot in the studio except for the sequence showing Strasser's arrival and close-ups of the Lockheed Electra (filmed at Van Nuys Airport) and a few short clips of stock footage views of Paris. The street used for the exterior shots had recently been built for another film, The Desert Song, and redressed for the Paris flashbacks.

The film critic Roger Ebert called Wallis the "key creative force" for his attention to the details of production (down to insisting on a real parrot in the Blue Parrot bar).

The difference between Bergman's and Bogart's height caused some problems. She was two inches (5 cm) taller than Bogart, and claimed Curtiz had Bogart stand on blocks or sit on cushions in their scenes together.

Later, there were plans for a further scene, showing Rick, Renault and a detachment of Free French soldiers on a ship, to incorporate the Allies' 1942 invasion of North Africa. It proved too difficult to get Claude Rains for the shoot, and the scene was finally abandoned after David O. Selznick judged "it would be a terrible mistake to change the ending".

The background of the final scene, which shows a Lockheed Model 12 Electra Junior airplane with personnel walking around it, was staged using little person extras and a proportionate cardboard plane. Fog was used to mask the model's unconvincing appearance.

=== Cinematography ===
The cinematographer was Arthur Edeson, a veteran who had previously shot The Maltese Falcon and Frankenstein. Particular attention was paid to photographing Bergman. She was shot mainly from her preferred left side, often with a softening gauze filter and with catch lights to make her eyes sparkle; the whole effect was designed to make her face seem "ineffably sad and tender and nostalgic". Bars of shadow across the characters and in the background variously imply imprisonment, the Cross of Lorraine—the symbol of the Free French Forces—and emotional turmoil. Dark film noir and expressionist lighting was used in several scenes, particularly towards the end of the picture. Rosenzweig argues these shadow and lighting effects are classic elements of the Curtiz style, along with the fluid camera work and the use of the environment as a framing device.

== Music ==
The music was written by Max Steiner. The song "As Time Goes By" by Herman Hupfeld had been part of the story from the original play; Steiner wanted to write his own composition to replace it, but Bergman had already cut her hair short for her next role (María in For Whom the Bell Tolls) and could not reshoot the scenes that incorporated the song, so Steiner based the entire score on it and "La Marseillaise", the French national anthem, transforming them as leitmotifs to reflect changing moods. Even though Steiner disliked "As Time Goes By", he admitted in a 1943 interview that it "must have had something to attract so much attention". (The song enjoyed a resurgence after the release of Casablanca, spending 21 weeks on the hit parade.)

Particularly memorable is the "duel of the anthems" between Strasser and Laszlo at Rick's café. In the soundtrack, "La Marseillaise" is played by a full orchestra. Originally, the opposing piece for this iconic sequence was to be the "Horst-Wessel-Lied", a Nazi anthem, but this was still under international copyright in non-Allied countries. Instead "Die Wacht am Rhein" was used. The "Deutschlandlied", the national anthem of Germany, is used several times in minor mode as a leitmotif for the German threat, e.g. in the scene in Paris as it is announced that the German army will reach Paris the next day. It is featured in the final scene, giving way to "La Marseillaise" after Strasser is shot.

Other songs include:

- "It Had to Be You", music by Isham Jones, lyrics by Gus Kahn
- "Shine", music by Ford Dabney, lyrics by Cecil Mack and Lew Brown
- "Avalon", music and lyrics by Al Jolson, Buddy DeSylva and Vincent Rose
- "Perfidia", by Alberto Domínguez
- "The Very Thought of You", by Ray Noble
- "Knock on Wood", music by M. K. Jerome, lyrics by Jack Scholl, the only original song
- "I'm Just Wild About Harry", by Eubie Blake
- "Heaven Can Wait", by Jimmy Van Heusen
- "Parlez-moi d'amour", by Jean Lenoir
- "Love for Sale", by Cole Porter

Dooley Wilson, who played Sam, was a drummer, not a pianist, so his piano playing was performed by Jean Plummer. After shooting had been completed, producer Wallis considered dubbing over Wilson's voice for his singing.

Very few films in the early 1940s had portions of the soundtrack released on 78 rpm records, and Casablanca was no exception. In 1997, almost 55 years after the film's premiere, Turner Entertainment in collaboration with Rhino Records issued the film's first original soundtrack album for release on compact disc, including original songs and music, spoken dialogue, and alternate takes.

The piano featured in the Paris flashback sequences was sold in New York City on December 14, 2012, at Sotheby's for more than $600,000 to an anonymous bidder. The piano Sam "plays" in Rick's Café Américain, put up for auction with other film memorabilia by Turner Classic Movies at Bonhams in New York on November 24, 2014, sold for $3.4 million.

== Release ==
Original trailer

Although an initial release date was anticipated for early 1943, Casablanca premiered at the Hollywood Theater in New York City on November 26, 1942, to capitalize on Operation Torch (the Allied invasion of French North Africa) and the capture of Casablanca. It went into general release on January 23, 1943, to take advantage of the Casablanca Conference, a high-level meeting in the city between Prime Minister Winston Churchill and President Franklin D. Roosevelt. The Office of War Information prevented screening of the film to troops in North Africa, believing it would cause resentment among Vichy supporters in the region.

=== Irish and German cuts ===
On March 19, 1943, the film was banned in Ireland for infringing on the Emergency Powers Order preserving wartime neutrality, by portraying Vichy France and Nazi Germany in a "sinister light". It was passed with cuts on June 15, 1945, shortly after the EPO was lifted. The cuts were made to dialogue between Rick and Ilsa referring to their love affair. A version with only one scene cut was passed on July 16, 1974; Irish national broadcaster RTÉ inquired about showing the film on TV, but found it still required a dialogue cut to Ilsa expressing her love for Rick.

Warner Brothers released a heavily edited version of Casablanca in West Germany in 1952. All scenes with Nazis were removed, along with most references to World War II. Important plot points were altered when the dialogue was dubbed into German. Victor Laszlo was no longer a Resistance fighter who escaped from a Nazi concentration camp. Instead, he became a Norwegian atomic physicist who was being pursued by Interpol after he "broke out of jail". The West German version was 25 minutes shorter than the original cut. A German version of Casablanca with the original plot was not released until 1975.

=== Colorization ===
Stills from the controversial colorized version

Casablanca was part of the film colorization controversy of the 1980s. In 1984, MGM/UA hired Color Systems Technology to colorize the film for $180,000. When Ted Turner of Turner Broadcasting System purchased MGM/UA's film library two years later, he canceled the request, before contracting American Film Technologies (AFT) in 1988. AFT completed the colorization in two months at a cost of $450,000.

When the colorized film debuted on WTBS in November 1988, it was watched by three million viewers, failing to make the top-ten viewed cable shows for the week. Leaders of the Directors Guild of America called it "a new low point in the battle to degrade an American art form."

The Library of Congress deemed that the color change differed so much from the original film that it gave a new copyright to Turner Entertainment. Although Jack Matthews of the Los Angeles Times called the finished product "state of the art", it was mostly met with negative critical reception. It was briefly available on home video. Gary Edgerton, writing for the Journal of Popular Film & Television criticized the colorization, stating that "Casablanca in color ended up being much blander in appearance and, overall, much less visually interesting than its 1942 predecessor." Bogart's son, Stephen, said, "if you're going to colorize Casablanca, why not put arms on the Venus de Milo?"

Turner later reacted to criticism of the colorization, saying, "[Casablanca] is one of a handful of films that really doesn't have to be colorized. I did it because I wanted to. All I'm trying to do is protect my investment."

=== Home media ===
Casablanca was initially released on Betamax and VHS by Magnetic Video and later by CBS/Fox Video (as United Artists owned the distribution rights at the time). In 1989, the Criterion Collection released a LaserDisc release sourced from a nitrate print; this includes supplements such as an audio commentary by Ronald Haver, a treatment for an unreleased sequel and wartime footage of the city of Casablanca. Criterion issued a CLV version of this in 1991 with only the film and commentary. It was next released on LaserDisc in 1991, and on VHS in 1992—both from MGM/UA Home Entertainment (distributing for Turner Entertainment Co.), which at the time was distributed by Warner Home Video. It was first released on DVD in 1998 by MGM, containing the trailer and a making-of featurette (Warner Home Video reissued the DVD in 2000). A subsequent two-disc special edition, containing an audio commentary by Roger Ebert, documentaries, Carrotblanca and a newly remastered visual and audio presentation, was released in 2003.

An HD DVD was released on November 14, 2006, containing the same special features as the 2003 DVD. Reviewers were impressed with the new high-definition transfer of the film.

A Blu-ray release with new special features came out on December 2, 2008; it is also available on DVD. The Blu-ray was initially only released as an expensive gift set with a booklet, a luggage tag and other assorted gift-type items. It was eventually released as a stand-alone Blu-ray in September 2009. On March 27, 2012, Warner released a new 70th Anniversary Ultimate Collector's Edition Blu-ray/DVD combo set. It includes a brand-new 4K restoration and new bonus material. This 4K restoration was completed at Warner Bros. Digital Imaging from a nitrate print, because the original negative no longer exists.

== Reception ==
=== Initial response ===
Casablanca received "consistently good reviews". Bosley Crowther of The New York Times wrote, "The Warners ... have a picture which makes the spine tingle and the heart take a leap." He applauded the combination of "sentiment, humor and pathos with taut melodrama and bristling intrigue." Crowther noted its "devious convolutions of the plot" and praised the screenplay quality as "of the best" and the cast's performances as "all of the first order".

The trade paper Variety commended the film's "combination of fine performances, engrossing story and neat direction" and the "variety of moods, action, suspense, comedy and drama that makes Casablanca an A-1 entry at the b.o." The review observed that the "[f]ilm is splendid anti-Axis propaganda, particularly inasmuch as the propaganda is strictly a by-product of the principal action and contributes to it instead of getting in the way". Variety also applauded the performances of Bergman and Henreid and noted, "Bogart, as might be expected, is more at ease as the bitter and cynical operator of a joint than as a lover, but handles both assignments with superb finesse."

Some reviews were less enthusiastic. The New Yorker rated Casablanca only "pretty tolerable" and said it was "not quite up to Across the Pacific, Bogart's last spyfest".

At the 1,500-seat Hollywood Theater, the film grossed $255,000 over ten weeks (equivalent to $4 million in 2025). In its initial American release, Casablanca was a substantial, but not spectacular, box-office success, earning $3.7 million (equivalent to $58 million in 2025). A 50th-anniversary release grossed $1.5 million in 1992. According to Warner Bros. records, the film earned $3,398,000 domestically and $3,461,000 in foreign markets.

=== Popularity ===
In the decades since its release, the film has grown in reputation. Murray Burnett called it "true yesterday, true today, true tomorrow". By 1955, the film had brought in $6.8 million, making it the third-most-successful of Warners' wartime movies, behind Shine On, Harvest Moon and This Is the Army. On April 21, 1957, the Brattle Theater of Cambridge, Massachusetts, showed the film as part of a season of old movies. It proved so popular that a tradition began in which Casablanca would be screened during the week of final exams at Harvard University. Todd Gitlin, a professor of sociology who had attended one of these screenings, has said that the experience was "the acting out of my own personal rite of passage". The tradition helped the film remain popular while other films that had been famous in the 1940s have faded from popular memory. By 1977, Casablanca had become the most frequently broadcast film on American television.

Ingrid Bergman's portrayal of Ilsa Lund in Casablanca became one of her best-known roles. In later years she said, "I feel about Casablanca that it has a life of its own. There is something mystical about it. It seems to have filled a need, a need that was there before the film, a need that the film filled."

On the film's 50th anniversary, the Los Angeles Times called Casablanca's great strength "the purity of its Golden Age Hollywoodness [and] the enduring craftsmanship of its resonantly hokey dialogue". Bob Strauss wrote in the newspaper that the film achieved a "near-perfect entertainment balance" of comedy, romance, and suspense.

Roger Ebert wrote in 1992:

There are greater movies. More profound movies. Movies of greater artistic vision or artistic originality or political significance. ... But [it is] one of the movies we treasure the most ... This is a movie that has transcended the ordinary categories.

In his opinion, the film is popular because "the people in it are all so good" and it is "a wonderful gem". He said that he had never heard of a negative review of the film, even though individual elements can be criticized, citing unrealistic special effects and the stiff character of Laszlo as portrayed by Henreid. Ebert also wrote:

Seeing the film over and over again, year after year, I find it never grows overfamiliar. It plays like a familiar musical album: the more I know it, the more I like it. The black-and-white cinematography has not aged as color would. The dialogue is so spare and cynical it has not grown old-fashioned. Much of the emotional effect of Casablanca is achieved by indirection. As we leave the theater, we are absolutely convinced that the only thing keeping the world from going crazy is the concerns of three little people who do, after all, amount to more than a hill of beans."

Critic and film historian Leonard Maltin in his Movie Guide gave it four of four stars: "Our candidate for the best Hollywood movie of all time".

According to Rudy Behlmer, the character of Rick is "not a hero ... not a bad guy" because he does what is necessary to appease the authorities and "sticks his neck out for nobody". Behlmer feels that the other characters are "not cut and dried" and come into their goodness over the course of the film. Renault begins as a collaborator with the Nazis who extorts sexual favors from refugees and has Ugarte killed. Even Ilsa, the least active of the main characters, is "caught in the emotional struggle" over which man she really loves. By the end, however, "everybody is sacrificing". Behlmer also emphasized the variety in the picture. "It's a blend of drama, melodrama, comedy [and] intrigue."

Scott Tobias, writing for The Guardian on the film's 80th anniversary, calls it "the jewel of Hollywood's Golden Age", and the best example of the system of film-making working: due not to an artistic genius but a combination of talented writing, set design, music, casting, supporting characters, and production.

A few reviewers have expressed reservations. To Pauline Kael, "It's far from a great film, but it has a special appealingly schlocky romanticism ..." Umberto Eco wrote that "by any strict critical standards ... Casablanca is a very mediocre film". He viewed the changes that the characters manifest as inconsistent rather than complex. "It is a comic strip, a hotchpotch, low on psychological credibility, and with little continuity in its dramatic effects." However, he added that because of the presence of multiple archetypes that allow "the power of Narrative in its natural state without Art intervening to discipline it", it is a film reaching "Homeric depths" as a "phenomenon worthy of awe".

On the review aggregator website Rotten Tomatoes, 99% of 136 critics' reviews are positive, with an average rating of 9.5/10. The website's consensus reads, "An undisputed masterpiece and perhaps Hollywood's quintessential statement on love and romance, Casablanca has only improved with age, boasting career-defining performances from Humphrey Bogart and Ingrid Bergman." On Metacritic, the film has a perfect score of 100 out of 100, based on 18 critics, indicating "universal acclaim". It is one of the few films in the site's history to achieve a perfect aggregate score.

In the November/December 1982 issue of Film Comment, Chuck Ross wrote that he retyped the Casablanca screenplay, reverting the title to Everybody Comes to Rick's and changing the name of Sam the piano player to Dooley (after Dooley Wilson, who played the character), and submitted it to 217 agencies. The majority of agencies returned the script unread (often because of policies regarding unsolicited screenplays) or did not respond. However, of those which did respond, only 33 specifically recognized it as Casablanca. Eight others observed that it was similar to Casablanca, and 41 agencies rejected the screenplay outright, offering comments such as "Too much dialogue, not enough exposition, the story line was weak, and in general didn't hold my interest." Three agencies offered to represent the screenplay, and one suggested turning it into a novel.

=== Influence on later works ===
Many subsequent films have drawn on elements of Casablanca. Passage to Marseille (1944) reunited actors Bogart, Rains, Greenstreet, and Lorre and director Curtiz in 1944, and there are similarities between Casablanca and a later Bogart film, To Have and Have Not (also 1944). Parodies have included the Marx Brothers' A Night in Casablanca (1946), Neil Simon's The Cheap Detective (1978), and Out Cold (2001). Indirectly, it provided the title for the 1995 neo-noir film The Usual Suspects. Woody Allen's Play It Again, Sam (1972) appropriated Rick Blaine as the fantasy mentor for Allen's character.

It was referred to in Terry Gilliam's dystopian Brazil (1985). Warner Bros. produced its own parody: Carrotblanca, a 1995 Bugs Bunny cartoon. The film critic Roger Ebert pointed out the plot of the film Barb Wire (1996) was identical to that of Casablanca. In Casablanca, a novella by Argentine writer Edgar Brau, the protagonist somehow wanders into Rick's Café Américain and listens to a strange tale related by Sam. The 2016 musical film La La Land contains allusions to Casablanca in the imagery, dialogue, and plot. Robert Zemeckis, director of Allied (2016), which is also set in 1942 Casablanca, studied the film to capture the city's elegance. The 2017 Moroccan drama film Razzia, directed by Nabil Ayouch, is mostly set in the city of Casablanca, and its characters frequently discuss the 1942 film.

=== Awards and honors ===
Because of its November 1942 release, the New York Film Critics decided to include the film in its 1942 award season for best picture. Casablanca lost to In Which We Serve. However, the Academy of Motion Picture Arts and Sciences stated that since the film went into national release at the beginning of 1943, it would be included in that year's nominations. Casablanca was nominated for eight Academy Awards, and won three.

Award	Category	Nominee	Result
Academy Awards	Outstanding Motion Picture	Warner Bros.	Won
Academy Awards	Best Director	Michael Curtiz	Won
Academy Awards	Best Actor	Humphrey Bogart	Nominated
Academy Awards	Best Supporting Actor	Claude Rains	Nominated
Academy Awards	Best Screenplay	Julius J. Epstein, Philip G. Epstein and Howard Koch	Won
Academy Awards	Best Cinematography – Black-and-White	Arthur Edeson	Nominated
Academy Awards	Best Film Editing	Owen Marks	Nominated
Academy Awards	Best Scoring of a Dramatic or Comedy Picture	Max Steiner	Nominated
National Board of Review Awards	Top Ten Films		6th place
National Board of Review Awards	Best Director	Michael Curtiz (also for This Is the Army)	Won
National Film Preservation Board	National Film Registry		Inducted
New York Film Critics Circle Awards	Best Director	Michael Curtiz	Nominated
New York Film Critics Circle Awards	Best Actor	Humphrey Bogart	Nominated
Saturn Awards	Best DVD Classic Film Release	Casablanca: Ultimate Collector's Edition	Nominated

As Bogart stepped out of his car at the awards ceremony, "the crowd surged forward, almost engulfing him and his wife, Mayo Methot. It took 12 police officers to rescue the two, and a red-faced, startled, yet smiling Bogart heard a chorus of cries of 'good luck' and 'here's looking at you, kid' as he was rushed into the theater".

When the award for Best Picture was announced, producer Hal B. Wallis got up to accept, but studio head Jack L. Warner rushed up to the stage "with a broad, flashing smile and a look of great self-satisfaction", Wallis later recalled.

I couldn't believe it was happening. Casablanca had been my creation; Jack had absolutely nothing to do with it. As the audience gasped, I tried to get out of the row of seats and into the aisle, but the entire Warner family sat blocking me. I had no alternative but to sit down again, humiliated and furious ... Almost forty years later, I still haven't recovered from the shock.

This incident led Wallis to leave Warner Bros. in April.

In 1989, the film was one of the first 25 films selected for preservation in the United States National Film Registry as being deemed "culturally, historically, or aesthetically significant". In 2005, it was named one of the 100 greatest films of the last 80 years by Time magazine (the selected films were not ranked). Bright Lights Film Journal stated in 2007, "It is one of those rare films from Hollywood's Golden Age which has managed to transcend its era to entertain generations of moviegoers ... Casablanca provides twenty-first-century Americans with an oasis of hope in a desert of arbitrary cruelty and senseless violence."

The film also ranked at number 28 on Empire's list of the 100 Greatest Movies of All Time, which said, "Love, honour, thrills, wisecracks and a hit tune are among the attractions, which also include a perfect supporting cast of villains, sneaks, thieves, refugees and bar staff. But it's Bogart and Bergman's show, entering immortality as screen lovers reunited only to part. The irrefutible [sic] proof that great movies are accidents."

Screenwriting teacher Robert McKee maintains that the script is "the greatest screenplay of all time". In 2006, the Writers Guild of America, West agreed, voting it the best ever in its list of the 101 greatest screenplays.

The film has been selected by the American Film Institute for many of their lists of important American films:

Year	Category	Rank
1998	AFI's 100 Years...100 Movies	2
2001	AFI's 100 Years...100 Thrills	37
2002	AFI's 100 Years...100 Passions	1
2003	AFI's 100 Years...100 Heroes and Villains	4: Rick Blaine (hero)
2004	AFI's 100 Years...100 Songs	2: "As Time Goes By"
2005	AFI's 100 Years...100 Movie Quotes	5: "Here's looking at you, kid." 20: "Louis, I think this is the beginning of a beautiful friendship." 28: "Play it, Sam. Play 'As Time Goes By'."; 32: "Round up the usual suspects." 43: "We'll always have Paris."; 67: "Of all the gin joints in all the towns in all the world, she walks into mine." These six lines are the most of any film (Gone with the Wind and The Wizard of Oz tied for second with three apiece). Also nominated for the list was, "Ilsa, I'm no good at being noble, but it doesn't take much to see that the problems of three little people don't amount to a hill of beans in this crazy world."
2006	AFI's 100 Years...100 Cheers	32
2007	AFI's 100 Years...100 Movies (10th Anniversary Edition)	3

== Interpretation ==
Casablanca has been subjected to many readings; semioticians account for the film's popularity by claiming that its inclusion of stereotypes paradoxically strengthens the film. Umberto Eco wrote:

Thus Casablanca is not just one film. It is many films, an anthology. Made haphazardly, it probably made itself, if not actually against the will of its authors and actors, then at least beyond their control. And this is the reason it works, in spite of aesthetic theories and theories of film making. For in it there unfolds with almost telluric force the power of Narrative in its natural state, without Art intervening to discipline it ... When all the archetypes burst in shamelessly, we reach Homeric depths. Two clichés make us laugh. A hundred clichés move us. For we sense dimly that the clichés are talking among themselves, and celebrating a reunion.

Eco also singled out sacrifice as a theme: "the myth of sacrifice runs through the whole film". It was this theme that resonated with a wartime audience who were reassured by the idea that painful sacrifice and going off to war could be romantic gestures done for the greater good.

Koch also considered the film a political allegory. Rick is compared to President Franklin D. Roosevelt, who gambled "on the odds of going to war until circumstance and his own submerged nobility force him to close his casino (partisan politics) and commit himself—first by financing the Side of Right and then by fighting for it". The connection is reinforced by the film's title, which means "white house".

Harvey Greenberg presents a Freudian reading in his The Movies on Your Mind, in which the transgressions that prevent Rick from returning to the United States constitute an Oedipus complex, which is resolved only when Rick begins to identify with the father figure of Laszlo and the cause that he represents. Sidney Rosenzweig argues that such readings are reductive and that the most important aspect of the film is its ambiguity, above all in the central character of Rick; he cites the different names that each character gives Rick (Richard, Ricky, Mr. Rick, Herr Rick and boss) as evidence of the different meanings that he has for each person.

== Derivative works ==
=== Remakes and unrealized sequels ===
Almost from the moment Casablanca became a hit, talk began of producing a sequel. One titled Brazzaville (in the final scene, Renault recommends fleeing to that Free French-held city) was planned, but never produced. A newspaper article at the time mentioned that Bogart and Greenstreet "will continue their characterizations from the first film, and it's likely that Geraldine Fitzgerald will have an important role". Since then, no studio has seriously considered filming a sequel or outright remake.

François Truffaut refused an invitation to remake the film in 1974, citing its cult status among American students as his reason. Attempts to recapture the magic of Casablanca in other settings, such as Caboblanco (1980), "a South American-set retooling of Casablanca", and Havana (1990), have been poorly received.

Stories of a Casablanca remake or sequel nonetheless persist. In 2008, Madonna was reported to be pursuing a remake set in modern-day Iraq. In 2012, both The Daily Telegraph and Entertainment Weekly reported on efforts by Cass Warner, granddaughter of Harry Warner and friend of the late Howard Koch, to produce a sequel featuring the search by Rick Blaine and Ilsa Lund's illegitimate son for the whereabouts of his biological father.

=== Adaptations ===
Several adaptations of the film were aired on radio. The two best-known are a thirty-minute adaptation on The Screen Guild Theater on April 26, 1943, starring Bogart, Bergman, and Henreid, and an hour-long version on the Lux Radio Theater on January 24, 1944, featuring Alan Ladd as Rick, Hedy Lamarr as Ilsa, and John Loder as Laszlo. Two other thirty-minute adaptations were aired, one on Philip Morris Playhouse on September 3, 1943, and the other on Theater of Romance on December 19, 1944, in which Dooley Wilson reprised his role as Sam.

On television, there have been two short-lived series based upon Casablanca, both sharing the title. The first Casablanca aired on ABC as part of the wheel series Warner Bros. Presents in hour-long episodes from 1955 to 1956. It was a Cold War espionage program set contemporaneously with its production, and starred Charles McGraw as Rick and Marcel Dalio, who had played Emil the croupier in the movie, as the police chief. The second Casablanca, broadcast on NBC in April 1983, starred David Soul as Rick and was canceled after three weeks.

The novel As Time Goes By, written by Michael Walsh and published in 1998, was authorized by Warner. The novel picks up where the film leaves off, and also tells of Rick's mysterious past in America. The book met with little success. David Thomson provided an unofficial sequel in his 1985 novel Suspects.

Julius Epstein made two attempts to turn the film into a Broadway musical, in 1951 and 1967, but neither made it to the stage. The original play, Everybody Comes to Rick's, was produced in Newport, Rhode Island, in August 1946, and again in London in April 1991, but met with no success. The film was adapted into a musical by the Takarazuka Revue, an all-female Japanese musical theater company, and ran from November 2009 through February 2010.

CasablancaBox, written by Sara Farrington and directed by Reid Farrington, premiered in New York in 2017 and was an imagined "making of" the film. It was nominated for two 2017 Drama Desk awards, Unique Theatrical Experience and Outstanding Projection Design. The New York Times described it as "a brave, almost foolhardy undertaking, presenting the backstage drama during the making of Casablanca".

== Inaccuracies and a misquote ==
Several unfounded rumors and misconceptions have grown around the film, one being that Ronald Reagan was originally chosen to play Rick. This originated in a press release issued by the studio early on in the film's development. By that time the studio already knew that he was going into the Army, and he was never seriously considered. George Raft claimed that he had turned down the lead role but studio records make it clear that Wallis was committed to Bogart from the start.

Another story is that the actors did not know until the last day of shooting how the film was to end. Koch later acknowledged:

When we began, we didn't have a finished script ... Ingrid Bergman came to me and said, "Which man should I love more ...?" I said to her, "I don't know ... play them both evenly." You see we didn't have an ending, so we didn't know what was going to happen!

While rewrites did occur during filming, Aljean Harmetz's examination of the scripts has shown that many of the key scenes were shot after Bergman knew how the film would end; any confusion was, according to critic Roger Ebert, "emotional", not "factual".

The film has several logical flaws, one being the "letters of transit" that enable their bearers to leave Vichy French territory. Ugarte says the letters had been signed by (depending on the listener) either Vichy General Weygand or Free French General de Gaulle. The French subtitles on the official DVD read Weygand, the English ones de Gaulle. Weygand had been the Vichy delegate-general for the North African colonies until November 1941, a month before the film is set. De Gaulle was the head of the Free French government in exile in London, so a letter signed by him would have provided no benefit. The letters were invented as a MacGuffin by Joan Alison for the original play and never questioned.

In the same vein, though Laszlo asserts that the Nazis cannot arrest him, saying, "This is still unoccupied France; any violation of neutrality would reflect on Captain Renault", Ebert points out, "It makes no sense that he could walk around freely. ... He would be arrested on sight." No uniformed German troops were stationed in Casablanca during World War II, and neither American nor French troops occupied Berlin in 1918, despite Renault's retort to Strasser, who calls Rick a "blundering American".

A line closely associated with Casablanca—"Play it again, Sam"—is not spoken in the film. When Ilsa first enters the Café Américain, she spots Sam and asks him, "Play it once, Sam, for old times' sake." After he feigns ignorance, she responds, "Play it, Sam. Play 'As Time Goes By'." Later that night, alone with Sam, Rick says, "You played it for her, you can play it for me", and "If she can stand it, I can! Play it!"

== See also ==
- List of cult films

== Bibliography ==
- Behlmer, Rudy (1985). Inside Warner Bros. (1935–1951). London: Weidenfeld and Nicolson. ISBN 978-0-297-79242-0.
- Casablanca (Two-Disc Special Edition DVD) (2003) (with audio commentaries by Roger Ebert and Rudy Behlmer and documentary Casablanca 50th Anniversary Special: You Must Remember This, narrated by Lauren Bacall).
- Epstein, Julius J. (1994). Casablanca. Imprenta Glorias. OCLC 31873886.
- Francisco, Charles (1980). You Must Remember This: The Filming of Casablanca. Englewood Cliffs, NJ: Prentice Hall. ISBN 978-0-13-977058-6.
- Gardner, Gerald (1988). The Censorship Papers: Movie Censorship Letters from the Hays Office, 1934 to 1968. New York: Dodd Mead. ISBN 978-0-396-08903-2.
- Harmetz, Aljean (1992). Round Up the Usual Suspects: The Making of Casablanca – Bogart, Bergman, and World War II. Hyperion. ISBN 978-1-56282-761-8.
- Isenberg, Noah (2017). We'll Always Have Casablanca: The Life, Legend, and Afterlife of Hollywood's Most Beloved Movie. New York: W.W. Norton & Company. ISBN 978-0-393-24312-3.
- Koch, Howard (1973). Casablanca: Script and Legend. The Overlook Press. ISBN 978-0-87951-006-0.
- Lebo, Harlan (1992). Casablanca: Behind the Scenes. Fireside. ISBN 978-0-671-76981-9.
- McGilligan, Pat (1986). Backstory: Interviews with Screenwriters of Hollywood's Golden Age. Berkeley, CA / Los Angeles: University of California Press. ISBN 978-0-520-05666-4.
- Miller, Frank (1992). Casablanca – As Times Goes By: 50th Anniversary Commemorative. Turner Publishing Inc. ISBN 978-1-878685-14-8.
- Robertson, James C. (1993). The Casablanca Man: The Cinema of Michael Curtiz London: Routledge. ISBN 0-415-06804-5
- Rosenzweig, Sidney (1982). Casablanca and Other Major Films of Michael Curtiz. Ann Arbor, MI: UofMI Research Press. ISBN 978-0-8357-1304-7.
