= Everybody Comes to Rick's =

1940 play written by Murray Burnett and Joan Alison

- Original language: English
- Written by: Murray Burnett, Joan Alison
- Characters: Rick Blaine, Lois Meredith, Luis Rinaldo
- Genre: Drama

Premiere
- Date: February 26, 1991
- Place: London

Everybody Comes to Rick's is an American play (written by Murray Burnett and Joan Alison) that was bought unproduced by Warner Brothers for a record figure of $20,000 (equivalent to $359,000 in 2025). It was adapted for film as Casablanca (1942), starring Humphrey Bogart and Ingrid Bergman. Written in 1940, prior to the United States' entry into World War II, the play was anti-Nazi and pro-French Resistance. The film became an American classic, highly successful and ranked by many as one of the greatest films ever made.

Feeling they had not received full recognition for their contributions, Burnett and Alison tried to regain control of the property, but the New York Court of Appeals ruled in 1986 that they had signed away their rights in their agreement with Warner Bros. Under their threat not to renew the agreement when the copyright reverted to them, the film company paid them each $100,000 (equivalent to $250,000 in 2025) and the right to produce the original play. It was produced in 1991 at the Whitehall Theatre in London, where it ran for six weeks.

== Origin ==
In the summer of 1938, while on vacation from his job as English teacher at a vocational school, Burnett and his wife Frances traveled to Vienna to help Jewish relatives of his wife smuggle money out of the country occupied by the Nazis since March of that year. Later, the couple visited Cap Ferrat, a small town in the south of France, where they went to La Belle Aurore, "a seedy café" overlooking the Mediterranean Sea. A black pianist played jazz for a crowd of French, Nazis, and refugees.

Burnett returned to the USA via the UK, staying a few weeks in Bournemouth. While there he started to make notes for his anti-Nazi play. In the summer of 1940, the 27-year-old teacher completed the play in six weeks with the collaboration of Joan Alison. They featured Rick, an American bar owner of the Café Americain in Casablanca, Morocco, whose European inhabitants, military personnel and refugees often frequent the café. Eventually, Rick helps an idealistic Czechoslovak resistance fighter escape with the woman Rick loves.

Soon after, writer Carly Wharton and actor Martin Gabel took an option to produce the play. But there was resistance since it might seem to some that Lois (Ilsa in the movie) "had slept with Rick in Casablanca in order to get the letters of transit".

== Casablanca ==
When Burnett and Alison failed to find a Broadway producer, they sold the play to Warner Bros. for $20,000, considered a record for an unproduced play, especially by two unknown writers. A story editor, Irene Diamond, had read it in manuscript in New York, and recommended it to her boss, producer Hal B. Wallis, as "sophisticated hokum".

Warner Bros. gave the script for adaptation first to screenwriter Casey Robinson, who worked on the romantic pairing of Rick and Ilsa; twin-brother screenwriters Julius and Philip Epstein, who worked on the overall structure and dialogue; and screenwriter Howard Koch, who worked on the politics. Only Koch was with the project during filming, when he continued to write new dialogue and scenes. The title was changed to Casablanca.

The inclusion of "As Time Goes By" came from Burnett and Alison's play. The song, from 1931, had been Burnett's favorite when he was a student at Cornell. "As Time Goes By", written by Herman Hupfeld, was first performed by Frances Williams in the musical comedy Everybody's Welcome, which had played on Broadway from October 1931 to February 1932.

=== Characters in play & film ===
| Name in Play | Name in Film | Notes |
|---|---|---|
| Rick Blaine | Rick Blaine | |
| Lois Meredith | Ilsa Lund | nationality changed (American to Norwegian) |
| Luis Rinaldo | Louis Renault | nationality changed (Italian to French) |
| The 'Rabbit' | Sam | |
| Victor Laszlo | Victor Laszlo | |
| Señor Martinez | Signor Ferrari | nationality changed (Spanish to Italian) |
| Guillermo Ugarte | Ugarte | nationality changed (Spanish to Italian) |

== Recognition ==
The film's opening credits say "Screen Play by ... Based on a Play by Murray Burnett and Joan Alison." After the success of Casablanca, Warner Brothers and the credited screenwriters downplayed the significance of the play in relation to the movie. Koch and the Epsteins received an Academy Award for best screenplay in 1943, but little recognition was given to Burnett and Alison.

The lead actors were not particularly aware of the film's basis. For instance, in 1974, Ingrid Bergman said in an interview: "Adapted from a play? Casablanca? I don't think so."

In 1973, the screenwriter Howard Koch wrote in New York magazine that Everybody Comes to Rick's "provided an exotic locale and a character named Rick who ran a cafe but little in the way of a story adaptable to the screen". Burnett unsuccessfully sued for $6.5 million in damages, contending his play had provided the heart of the film. In 1991, Howard Koch, who was then 89 years old, said in a letter to the Los Angeles Times that, after rereading the play, he thought it had provided "the spine" of the movie.

When the television series based on Casablanca aired in 1983, Burnett and Alison sued Warner Bros. for royalties. Burnett also said that he wanted to control his characters and intended to complete a sequel to the play. In 1986, the New York State Court of Appeals determined that the pair had signed away all rights to their work under the terms of their agreement when they sold the play. With the copyright due to revert to Burnett and Alison in 1997, they threatened not to renew their agreement with Warner Bros. The company paid them each $100,000 and gave them the right to produce the original play.

== Stage production ==
In February 1991, Everybody Comes to Rick's was produced by David Kelsey at the Churchill Theatre in Bromley, Kent - advertised as both Rick's Bar in Casablanca and Everybody Comes to Rick's Bar in Casablanca. In April it transferred to the West End, running at the Whitehall Theatre for six weeks under the simplified title Rick's Bar Casablanca. Leslie Grantham played Rick, Shelley Thompson was Lois, and Edward de Souza played Louis Renault.

== The authors ==
=== Murray Burnett ===
Murray Burnett was born in New York City on December 28, 1910. He was a high school teacher at Central Commercial High School before becoming a playwright.

After a trip to Europe with his wife Frances in 1938 to help their Jewish relatives smuggle money out of Nazi-occupied Austria, the Burnetts went to the Mediterranean. They saw many exiles and refugees there. Burnett was inspired by events to make notes for a play.

He completed the play about "Rick's" during the summer of 1940, in collaboration with his writer friend Joan Alison. Their first play, One in a Million, an anti-Nazi spy vehicle, attracted the interest of director Otto Preminger, but no film project developed.

"Later he wrote a book called Hickory Stick, didn't copyright it, and they made it into Blackboard Jungle. He didn't get a penny for it."
— Barbara Kopple

Burnett also wrote the play Hickory Street (writer Amnon Kabatchnik says the correct title is Hickory Stick), together with Frederick Stephani. It featured a wounded veteran who teaches at a vocational high school in New York. It opened on Broadway in 1944 starring Steve Cochran.

Burnett wrote, produced, and directed many radio plays, including the 1952 ABC series Cafe Istanbul, with the German actress Marlene Dietrich as Mlle. Madou. This show was adapted as Time for Love, which ran for 38 episodes on CBS Radio in 1953.

At the time of his and Alison's suit in 1985, Burnett was working for the Corporation for Entertainment and Learning in Manhattan. He had the first 15 pages written for a sequel to Everybody Comes to Rick's.

He was first married to Frances, with whom he had traveled to Europe in 1938. They divorced after having a daughter, Lori.

Burnett met his second wife, actress Adrienne Bayan, when she had a role in his play Hickory Street. Burnett was the uncle of documentary director Barbara Kopple. He died on September 23, 1997, in New York City.

=== Joan Alison ===
Born Alice Joan Leviton (3 May 1901 – 30 March 1992), she used Joan Alison as her pen name. She was born in New York, was a competitive billiards player in her teens, and married Samuel Nirenberg in 1920, with whom she had three children, divorcing in 1937. Alison and Burnett first co-wrote A Million to One, an anti-Nazi play, in which Otto Preminger took an interest, but no film project developed. Their second effort was Everybody Comes to Rick's.

In 1940, Burnett and Alison also collaborated on another play, What Are Little Boys Made Of? Burnett and Alison wrote Dry Without Tears, 1942. In 1945, theatrical producer Lee Sabinson (Finian's Rainbow) bought Moment of Glory, yet another Burnett-Alison collaboration.

In 1943 Alison had collaborated with lyricist Stella Unger and blind pianist Alec Templeton on an un-produced musical, Cabbages and Kings (also called Tea Tray in the Sky), described as a "modern Alice in Wonderland."

Alison lived in an apartment in New York's Greenwich Village (60 E. 8th St). She died in 1992 at the age of 90. Two days after her death notice appeared in The New York Times, her children, grandchildren, great-grandchildren and friends remembered her with a special screening of Casablanca at the Museum of Modern Art.
