= National Board of Review Awards 1943 =

Annual US film awards ceremony

15th National Board of Review Awards

December 23, 1943

The 15th National Board of Review Awards were announced on 23 December 1943.

== Best English Language Films ==
1. The Ox-Bow Incident
2. Watch on the Rhine
3. Air Force
4. Holy Matrimony
5. The Hard Way
6. Casablanca
7. Lassie Come Home
8. Bataan
9. The Moon Is Down
10. Next of Kin

== Winners ==
- Best Actors:
  - Paul Lukas - Watch on the Rhine
  - Harry Morgan - Happy Land and The Ox-Bow Incident
  - Cedric Hardwicke - The Cross of Lorraine and The Moon Is Down
- Best Actresses:
  - Gracie Fields - Holy Matrimony
  - Katina Paxinou - For Whom the Bell Tolls
  - Teresa Wright - Shadow of a Doubt
- Best Directors:
  - Michael Curtiz - Casablanca and This Is the Army
  - Tay Garnett - Bataan and The Cross of Lorraine
  - William Wellman - The Ox-Bow Incident
- Best English Language Film: The Ox-Bow Incident
