= Casablanca (novella) =

2003 novella by Edgar Brau

Casablanca and Other Stories
- 2006 English edition cover
- Author: Edgar Brau
- Original title: Casablanca
- Translator: Andrea G. Labinger
- Language: English/Spanish
- Genre: Novella
- Publisher: METZENGERSTEIN(Argentina); MSU Press(U.S.)
- Publication date: August 2003
- Publication place: United States
- English publication date: September 2006
- Media type: Print (hardback)
- Pages: 134
- ISBN: 978-0-87013-768-6

Casablanca is a novella written by Edgar Brau in Nevada, United States, in November–December 2002. In the story, set in Buenos Aires Province, Argentina, a rich Argentine ranch owner builds a replica of Rick's Café Américain on his estate, with the idea of reproducing in it, by means of doubles, the most important scenes of the movie Casablanca.

== Plot summary ==
Casablanca begins when the narrator, who is driving his car to Mar del Plata seaside resort, is caught by a big storm. While looking for some shelter he comes across a place similar to Rick's Café Américain. He gets out of the car and, almost blinded by the rain, hurries to the entrance door. Just then somebody starts playing "As Time Goes By" on a piano at the back of the room. The player is identical to Sam, but much older; he is wearing the same suit jacket that is shown in the film, but worn out now. In one of the corners, an old man in dark glasses, who looks like Humphrey Bogart, is dozing at a table. When the song is over, the black man starts to tell the narrator the story of the place and of the people who lived there.

It all started, he says, in the early fifties, when the owner of those lands, a rich man very similar to Sydney Greenstreet —the actor who interpreted Señor Ferrari— decides to build a replica of Rick's café to reproduce in it the main scenes of the movie. With this purpose, he sends agents around the country and abroad, to look for people whose physical appearance is identical to the characters. He keeps for himself the role of Señor Ferrari. When the cast is ready, they rehearse for some months; their voices and accents must sound like the English spoken in the original version. To imitate the black-and-white movie, everything in the place is in lighter or darker shades of grey.

When the café is opened, it is very successful. The people who visit it have the feeling they are “inside” the famous movie. Señor Ferrari's dream (“Ferrari” is the name given to the ranch owner in the story) of turning the movie Casablanca into reality has come true.

Some years of splendor follow, but an epidemic of hoof-and-mouth disease and an unexpected flood affect Señor Ferrari's property, and he goes bankrupt. He speaks with President Perón to get a license to play for real money at the roulette wheel and the poker tables (up to that moment people pretended that they were gambling). President Perón —who had visited the place some months before and had an affair with Ilsa (Ferrari's lover) — agrees to it.

The café manages to survive, although far from its past magnificence. Then a military coup overthrows Perón, and the casino is closed. It is a hard blow for Ferrari, who commits suicide. In his will, he states that the café will remain the property of his employees, provided that they never shut it down or put it up for sale.

In the following weeks, they try to do their best to make ends meet, but after a while, some of them give up and desert the place. In a few months, the only ones who remain are Rick, Ilsa, Sam, Renault, and Ugarte. To make a living they decide to perform isolated scenes, which are shown to the few tourists who happen to go by.

Time passes, and not only the place deteriorates but the health of its dwellers as well. The moment the narrator arrives, Sam can offer nothing but an account of what happened in that fantastic Casablanca, and introduce Rick and Ilsa, who are much older now (Rick is blind; Ilsa makes a brief appearance, dressed as Ingrid Bergman in one of the scenes of the movie). In a vase placed near the exit door, visitors leave a few coins.

Meanwhile, the storm has subsided. Sam plays "As Time Goes By" once again, to say goodbye now. The narrator gets into his car and, with the feeling that he has witnessed a sequel to the movie that Hollywood never made, leaves the place.

== Background ==
In 2002 Edgar Brau was invited by the University of Nevada, Reno, as visiting professor and writer-in-residence for the fall 2002 – spring 2003. As writer-in-residence he had to write a work of fiction during his stay. He had been considering the possibility of writing a fantastic narration (in the line of his The Poem or The Buddha's Eyes) that would be a tribute to his father's movie-theater, where he had spent his childhood years. As he said:

“I started Casablanca with the idea of writing a fantastic story that would pay tribute to my father's cinema, where I spent my early years. I wanted that cinema, the building itself, to be very much present in the work. But I soon realized that the narration was leading somewhere else, and as one must never go against the way a story unfolds, I decided to put off that homage for another occasion. Later on I will do it, and with a fantastic story, as I said”.

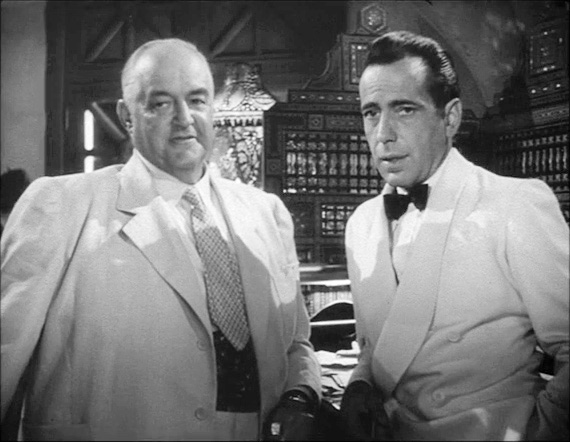
Sidney Greenstreet (left) and Humphrey Bogart (right)

So, the novella developed a realistic tone and it had little to do with that cinema of his childhood. It was written in November–December 2002, in Reno, and corrected in February 2003 at Lake Tahoe.

== Main characters ==
Señor Ferrari
A rich Argentine ranch owner, who offers all his possessions to his admired Ingrid Bergman as long as she marries him. His proposal is rejected, so he decides to create his own Casablanca on his estate, and to play the role of Señor Ferrari.

Sam
He is from Uruguay. He was working as a bellhop at a hotel in the City of Buenos Aires when Señor Ferrari came across him. He's the true narrator in the novella.

Rick
Argentinean, a former high school literature teacher. He's very fond of French authors and given to drinking. When the novella starts he is over eighty years old and blind.

Ilsa
Australian. She earned her living as a trapeze artist at an American circus. On a Brazil tour she was hired by one of Señor Ferrari's agents to work as Ingrid Bergman's double. Foul mouthed and energetic, she becomes Ferrari's mistress and protégée. In the story, Sam calls her “Elsa”.

Ugarte
Before being hired by Señor Ferrari, he sang tangos at a strip-tease night club in the City of Buenos Aires.

Fortunato
A homeless child adopted by Ilsa and Sam when he was a few months old. In the story he is around ten. Although he does not know the language, he reads French books to Rick.

The Narrator
Nothing is said about his age, physical appearance or profession.

== Theme ==
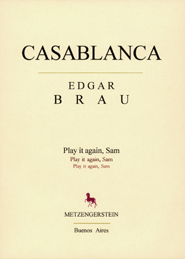
Casablanca Spanish edition

The novella Casablanca is a perfect metaphor of Argentina. In the story, the Argentine Casablanca is a copy of the famous movie; in real life, Argentina was built as a copy of certain European countries, a copy, so to say, that “Europeans in exile” (as Borges defined himself and Argentines) made of a movie entitled “Europe”.

The splendor of the Argentine Casablanca was weakened, at first, by certain natural disasters, and later on by catastrophical political events; the splendor of Argentina, was eroded mainly by those unfortunate political events. Among them (and as a parallel between real life and fiction which Brau's work reflects perfectly), are the military coups that shook the nation in the period 1930-1980.

In the novella, the coup d´état which overthrew President Perón in 1955 was the beginning of the end for Ferrari's fabulous work, for his Casablanca —which had already been “hurt” by the flood and the hoof-and-mouth disease—. In real life, the beginning of the end for that other “Casablanca”, Argentina, took place some years earlier, in 1930 (when José Félix Uriburu led a military coup against President Hipólito Yrigoyen), and the signs of decadence were revealed more slowly.

The novella has an open ending. The same thing sometimes happens in real life.

== Translation into English ==
The translation of Casablanca by Andrea G. Labinger was finalist in 2007 Pen USA Literary Award in the category of Translation.

== See also ==
- History of Argentina
