= Irene Diamond =

American talent scout and philanthropist (1910–2003)

- Born: Irene Levine; May 7, 1910
- Died: January 21, 2003 (aged 92); New York City, U.S.
- Occupations: Talent scout, philanthropist
- Spouse: Aaron Diamond

Irene Diamond (May 7, 1910 – January 21, 2003) was an American Hollywood talent scout and later in life a philanthropist.

== Early life ==
Irene Diamond was born Irene Levine on May 7, 1910, to Jewish immigrant parents.

== Career ==
Diamond was an assistant editor for Warner Brothers in their story division. During a 25-year collaboration with producer Hal B. Wallis, she made recommendations on many scripts, including The Maltese Falcon and Dark Victory. In 1941 on a visit to New York City she read an unproduced play titled Everybody Comes to Rick's, by Murray Burnett and Joan Alison. After she persuaded Wallis to purchase the script for $20,000, he retitled it and produced the film Casablanca.

== Philanthropy ==
Diamond was co-chair of the Aaron Diamond Foundation with her husband from the 1950s onwards. Following his sudden death in 1985, Diamond became the sole president of the foundation. They established the Aaron Diamond AIDS Research Center in 1991.

Diamond founded the Irene Diamond Fund in 1994. The fund endowed AIDS research.

In 2000, Diamond founded the New York Choreographic Institute alongside Peter Martins.

In 1999, then U.S. President Bill Clinton presented her with the National Medal of Arts award. She was elected a fellow of the American Academy of Arts and Sciences in 2001.

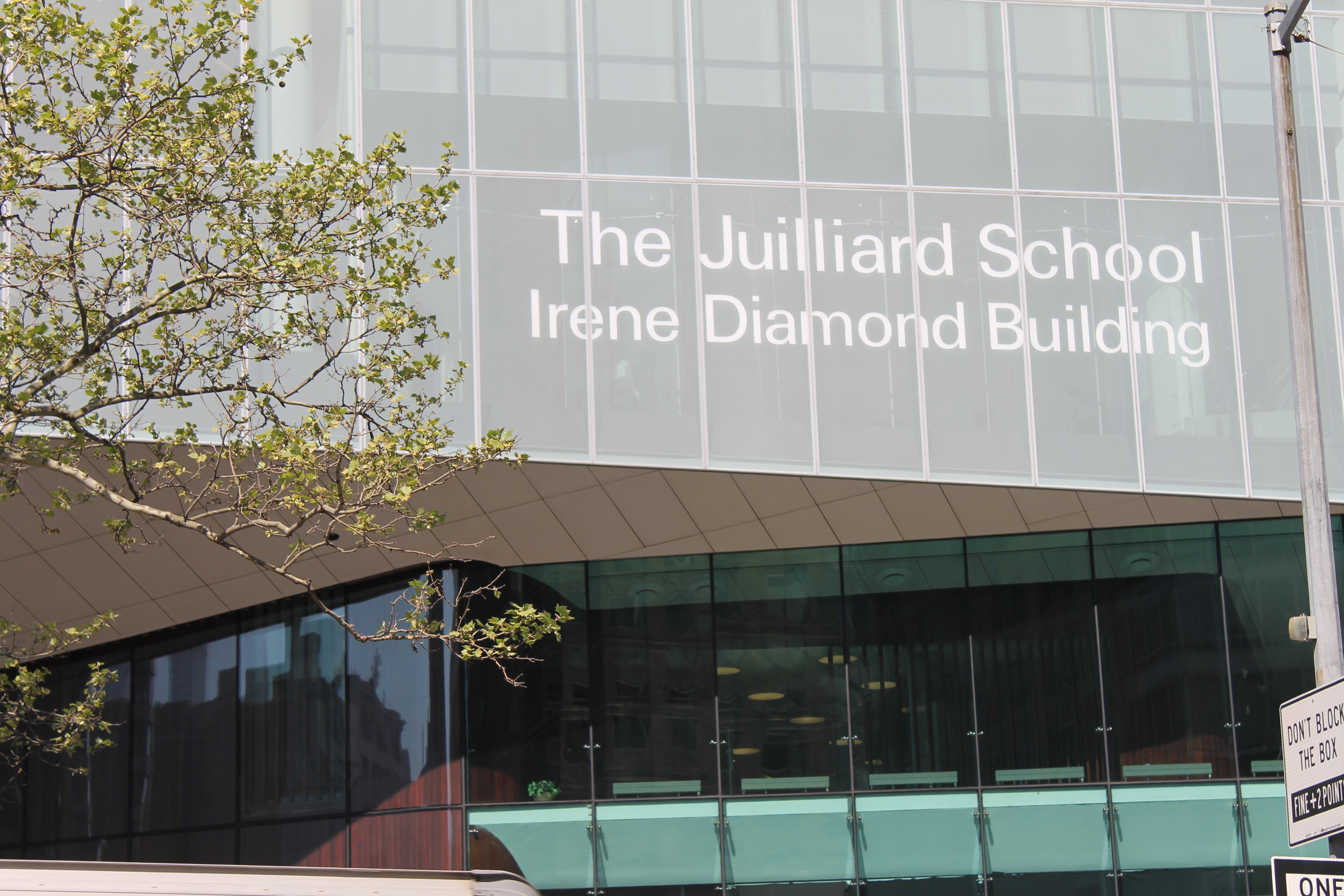
Irene Diamond Building at the Juilliard School

== Personal life ==
She was married to real estate developer Aaron Diamond from 1942 until his death in 1985. They resided on the Upper East Side of Manhattan in New York City, and had one daughter, Jean.

== Death ==
Diamond died of a heart attack in her home on January 21, 2003, in New York City.
