= As Time Goes By (Bobby Vinton and George Burns album) =

Studio album by Bobby Vinton and George Burns
- Released: January 1992
- Genres: Pop, standards
- Length: 28:30
- Label: Curb
- Producer: Michael Lloyd

Bobby Vinton chronology
| 16 Most Requested Songs (1991) | As Time Goes By (1992) | The Essence of Bobby Vinton (1993) |

As Time Goes By is a duet album recorded by Bobby Vinton and George Burns. It was Vinton's thirty-seventh and final studio album. The first three songs are recorded by Vinton and Burns as duets. The fourth, fifth, and tenth tracks are solos by Burns, while the sixth to ninth tracks are solos by Vinton.

At the end of the song "As Time Goes By," Burns makes a reference to the film Casablanca by saying, "Y'know, Bobby, this could be the start of a beautiful friendship."

The song "Gracie" was written in memory of Burns' wife, Gracie Allen.

== Track listing ==
| No. | Title | Writer(s) | Length |
|---|---|---|---|
| 1. | "I Know What It Is to Be Young (But You Don't Know What It Is to Be Old)" | Jerry Abbott | 3:27 |
| 2. | "As Time Goes By" | Herman Hupfeld | 3:25 |
| 3. | "Young at Heart" | Carolyn Leigh, Johnny Richards | 2:56 |
| 4. | "Gracie" | Michael Lloyd | 2:22 |
| 5. | "Good Old Bad Old Days" | Anthony Newley, Leslie Bricusse | 2:23 |
| 6. | "I Believe (I'm in Love With You)" | Gene Allen, Bobby Vinton | 2:42 |
| 7. | "Let the Heartaches Begin" | Tony Macaulay, John Macleod | 3:39 |
| 8. | "You've Changed" | Carl Fisher, Bill Carey | 2:36 |
| 9. | "How Old Do You Get" | Peter McCann, Chip Young | 3:10 |
| 10. | "The Only Way to Go" | Marvin Hamlisch, Tim Rice | 1:50 |

== Personnel ==
Adapted from AllMusic.

- Dennis Belfield – bass
- Susan Boyd – background vocals
- George Burns – performer
- Charles Bush – photography
- Pat Coil – piano
- Irving Fine – executive producer
- Bob Glaub – bass
- Jim Haas – background vocals
- Keith Heffner – assistant engineer, programming
- John Jorgenson – guitar
- Jon Joyce – background vocals
- Laurence Juber – arranger, guitar
- Bob Kearney – engineer
- Paul Leim – drums
- Gayle Levant – harp
- Michael Lloyd – arranger, engineer, guitar, mixing, producer, background vocals
- Chris Lytton – background vocals
- Bobby Martin – saxophone
- Michael J. Pick – executive producer
- John Valentino – assistant engineer
- Bobby Vinton – vocals
- Brian Zsupnick – drums
