= As Time Goes By (novel) =

1998 novel by Michael Walsh

- First edition cover
- Author: Michael Walsh
- Genre: Historical Fiction
- Publisher: Warner Books
- Publication date: 1 October 1998
- Publication place: United States
- Media type: Print (hardcover, e-book, audio)
- Pages: 432 pp (first edition, hardback)
- ISBN: 978-0446519007

As Time Goes By is a novel written by American author Michael Walsh, intended as a prequel/sequel to the film Casablanca. It was published in 1998. The book alternates between the early life of Rick Blaine (played by Humphrey Bogart in the film) in America and the period immediately after the plane leaves Casablanca at the end of the 1942 film.

== Plot ==
1931-35

Yitzik "Rick" Baline is a small-time New York criminal during the time of Prohibition. He meets and falls in love with Lois, daughter of Solly Horowitz, a big-time gangster and becomes a favorite of Solly. He eventually becomes Boss of the 'Tootsie-Wootsie' Club, a speakeasy. He is viewed with extreme disfavor by Tick-Tock, Solly's principal assistant, who plans to be the heir to Solly's businesses if he should retire or be killed.

Solly makes it clear that Lois is intended for better things, and she eventually marries a lawyer and would-be politician, Robert Meredith, whom she does not really love.

Warfare erupts between the Horowitz, Salucci and O'Hanlon gangs and there are several deaths. Solly and Tick-Tock are killed, as are Lois and her husband, now exposed as a corrupt politician. Rick must flee America. He takes Solly's money, half a million dollars, probably intended for Lois, and travels to Boston with Sam. While the two are purchasing tickets for a steamship to Le Havre, Rick changes his name to Richard Blaine.

1941-42

Rick, Louis and Sam leave Casablanca with documents provided by Louis. They all travel via Lisbon to London. America has now entered WW2 and they track down Victor, who is keen to resume his part in the work of the Czech Resistance. Ilsa begs him to allow her to assist him, and Rick and Louis also become involved while Sam stays in London.

Ilsa, who speaks perfect Russian, is placed in Prague as an assistant to Reinhard Heydrich, the 'Butcher of Prague'. Her cover is as a White Russian, and she gains his confidence to the point where he wants her to become his mistress.

The plot to assassinate Heydrich (Operation Anthropoid) goes ahead, despite last-minute delays and great risks. During the operation Victor kills Louis, having become convinced that he was a traitor. He then assassinates Heydrich but is killed in the process.

With North Africa once again in Allied hands, Ilsa and Rick marry and return to Casablanca with Sam. With Carl as the new owner, Rick's Café Americain is still operating.
