= Michael Walsh (author) =

American author (born 1949)

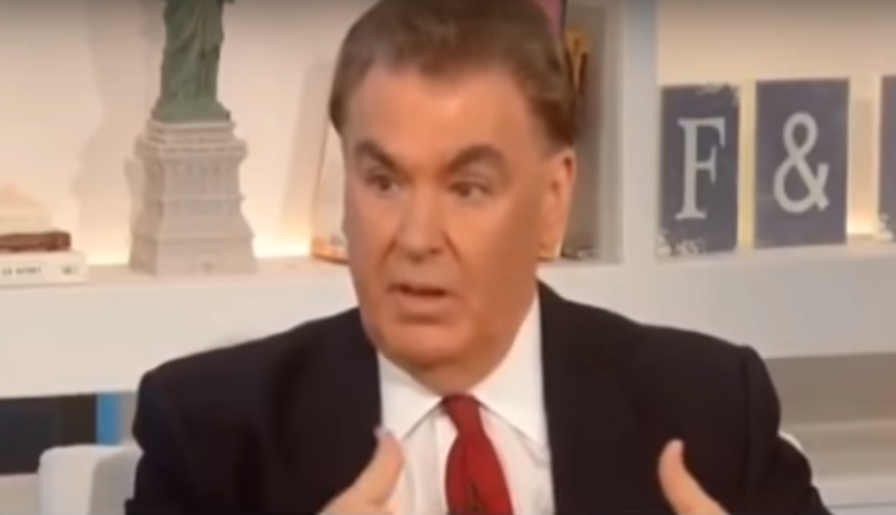
- Walsh in 2018
- Born: October 23, 1949 (age 76)
- Occupations: Author; media critic; music critic; screenwriter

Michael A. Walsh (born October 23, 1949) is an American music critic, author, screenwriter, media critic, historian, and cultural-political consultant.

== Career ==
A 1971 graduate of the Eastman School of Music in Rochester, New York, Walsh began his journalism career as a reporter and later music critic in 1972 at the Rochester Democrat and Chronicle in upstate New York. He was named chief classical music critic of the San Francisco Examiner in November 1977, where in 1980 he won an ASCAP-Deems Taylor Award for music criticism. He became music critic of Time magazine in the spring of 1981, where his cover story subjects included James Levine, Vladimir Horowitz and Andrew Lloyd Webber. He was also a foreign correspondent for the magazine from 1989 to 1996, based in Munich, Germany, from which city he covered first-hand the fall of the Berlin Wall in 1989 and the collapse of Soviet communism in 1991.

Beginning in February, 2007 and running until 2015, Walsh wrote for National Review both under his own name and using a fictional persona named David Kahane, the name of which "is borrowed from a screenwriter character in (the movie) The Player". This persona has evolved into one of "... a Hollywood liberal who has a habit of sharing way too much about the rules by which they live to a conservative audience."

In January, 2010, in collaboration with Andrew Breitbart, he launched BigJournalism.com, devoted to media commentary and criticism. From December 3, 2010, to the summer of 2013 he contributed a weekly opinion column for the New York Post, and in late June 2012 became a featured columnist at PJ Media. He is now the editor of the website the-pipeline.org, which deals with energy issues. His work has appeared in such publications as The New York Times, Vanity Fair, GQ, Playboy, Smithsonian Magazine, and Connoisseur; in Europe, he has been published in Transatlantik, Die Woche, and the British edition of Esquire. His literary works have been translated into more than twenty languages, including German, Russian, Polish, Hungarian, Japanese, Chinese, and Portuguese.

== Bibliography ==
=== Non-fiction ===
- Carnegie Hall: The First One Hundred Years (Harry N. Abrams, 1987)
- Who's Afraid of Classical Music (Fireside Books, 1989)
- Andrew Lloyd Webber: His Life and Works (Abrams, 1989, updated 1997)
- Who's Afraid of Opera? (1994)
- So When Does the Fat Lady Sing? (Amadeus, 2008)
- Rules for Radical Conservatives (as David Kahane; Ballantine, 2010)
- The People v. the Democratic Party (Encounter Broadside, 2012)
- The Devil's Pleasure Palace (Encounter Books, 2015)
- The Fiery Angel (Encounter Books, 2018)
- Last Stands (St. Martin's Press, Dec. 2020)
- Against the Great Reset (Bombardier Books, 2022)
- Against the Corporate Media (Bombardier Books, 2024)

=== Novels ===
- Exchange Alley (1997), a Book-of-the-Month Club alternate selection upon publication that has since become a cult novel
- As Time Goes By (sequel to the film Casablanca, 1998)
- And All the Saints (2003), a fictionalized autobiography of Owney Madden's life that was a 2004 American Book Awards winner.

=== Espionage thrillers ===
- Hostile Intent, featuring the character of "Devlin", a top-secret operative of the Central Security Service, was published in September 2009 by Pinnacle. It reached No. 1 on the Amazon Kindle bestseller list upon its release, and twice appeared on the New York Times's extended bestseller list in October of that year.
- A sequel, Early Warning, was published in September 2010.
- The third book in the series, Shock Warning, was published in late September, 2011.

=== Film ===
Cadet Kelly, a 2002 Disney Channel Original Movie (co-written with Gail Parent) starring Hilary Duff was, until High School Musical, the highest-rated Disney Channel movie in history. He also wrote and produced the 1995 documentary Placido Domingo: A Musical Life for PBS, and wrote the narration for the 1999 video version of Andrew Lloyd Webber and Tim Rice's musical, Joseph and the Amazing Technicolor Dreamcoat.

=== Other ===
A lifetime member of the Writers Guild of America, Walsh has written Hard Headed Woman, a biopic of the rockabilly singer Wanda Jackson, for LD Entertainment, and 25/7 for Disney. Scripts in development include How High the Moon, about the lives of Ella Fitzgerald and Billie Holiday; Hound and Horn, set in 1940s Marseilles; and The Harp, a feature film/television series set in rural 19th-century Ireland. His Cold War script, Charlie (Mikael Håfström, director), is currently in the financing and casting stage.

== Personal life ==
He currently serves on the advisory board of the Wende Museum in Los Angeles. His principal residences are in rural Connecticut and in County Clare, Ireland.
