= Cinema Vox (Tangier) =

Movie theater in Tangier, Morocco

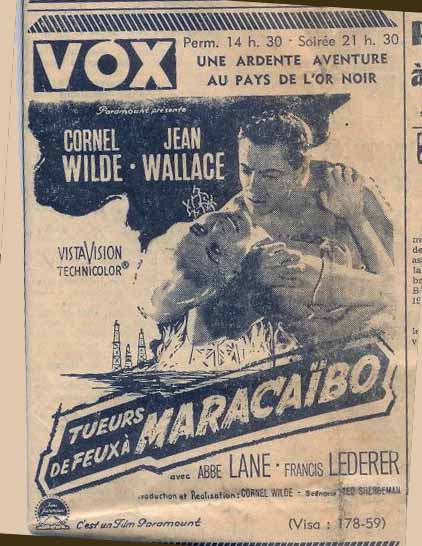
Cinema Vox poster

The Cinema Vox was a movie theater in Tangier, Morocco, opened in 1935. Morocco's Vox in Tangier was Africa's biggest when it opened in 1935, with 2,000 seats and a retractable roof. The bar at Cinema Vox is said to have been the inspiration for Rick's Café Américain in the film Casablanca.

The philosopher and former head of the Centre du Cinéma Marocain, Noureddine Saïl, recalled that Cinema Vox was "the total capital of Egyptian cinema" in Tangier in the 1950s.
