= List of Kiddy Grade episodes =

This is a list of episodes from the anime series Kiddy Grade, which ran for 24 episodes between 2002 and 2003.

No.	Title	Original release date
1	"Depth/Space"	October 8, 2002
Humans have colonized space and the planets are governed by the Global Union. Galactic commerce is governed by the Galactic Organization of Trade and Tariffs (GOTT). If problems arise they have a secret force of ES-Members who have special powers and operate above the law. Éclair and Lumière are sent to sort out a dispute where the Faunusian military have formed a space blockade around the planet Medeia.
2	"Tight/Bind"	October 15, 2002
Éclair, Lumière and two other higher ranking ES Members (Alv and Dvergr) are sent to investigate the illegal trade in a substance called Hi-G which, although it has important legitimate uses, can be used to make destructive Gravity Bombs. Along the way they find out just how dangerous these devices are first hand.
3	"Prisoner/Escort"	October 22, 2002
Éclair and Lumière arrest a dangerous criminal named Drake Han and are tasked with escorting him back to custody. However the journey doesn't go smoothly as Drake is paid up with the Insurance Company who have immense resources at their disposal to help out their "clients" when they get into trouble.
4	"High/Speed"	October 29, 2002
Éclair goes solo, undercover as a battle cyborg, to investigate the use of illegal speed enhancement technology. "Foxy Fox" is her current target, having possession of this technology, but they end up fighting together against a more serious threat.
5	"Day/Off"	November 5, 2002
Éclair and Lumière have a day off from work and go their separate ways for a bit of personal time - Lumière to the Opera and Éclair for a girls night out. Even when off duty they can't get away from each other, however, as both become unwittingly embroiled in a war between two gangs over a very delicate cargo.
6	"Twin/Star"	November 19, 2002
Éclair helps a fellow GOTT operative Mrs. Padushka uncover the suspects behind a recent string of airplane burglaries. By acting as "decoys", this allows fellow ES members Sinistra and Dextera to uncover that a group of corrupt police are the culprits.
7	"Trial/Child"	November 26, 2002
Éclair and Lumière are asked to help a young boy named Timothy to claim his inheritance; control over a huge Nouvlesse corporation. However the Nouvlesse shun Timothy as a commoner and it is up to Éclair to help him claim his rightful position. With help from Viola and Cesario, Timothy proves himself worthy, and also comes to a realization that his apparent childhood abandonment by his father was done out of love rather than neglect.
8	"Forbidden/Instrument"	December 3, 2002
Éclair and Lumière join forces with siblings Tweedledee and Tweedledum to uncover a smuggling ring dealing in Geo-Sort bombs. The destructive force of these bombs - planet-killers, combined with the prospect that the GOTT may have a hand in the smuggling ring provides additional tension. Ultimately it takes a combined effort (including help from Alv and Dvergr) to overcome the deadly force of a Geo-Sort bomb set off by the smugglers to cover their tracks.
9	"Mirage/Snare"	December 10, 2002
There have been some mysterious disappearances on the planet Dardanos and ES agents Éclair and Lumière are sent to investigate. They discover that members of the Nouvlesse government have killed any who discovered their secret plans to brainwash the population. They destroy the transmitters, but the exposure unlocks dark memories in Éclair's past.
10	"Rebirth/Slave"	December 17, 2002
Éclair takes some time off to try to come to terms with the dark memories that have haunted her since Dardanos. She is taunted by a dark shadow of herself that says she will always be a killer. She and Lumière are sent to rescue A-ou and Un-ou, two ES members. Éclair survives, but ends up in the hospital.
11	"Set/Free"	January 7, 2003
Eclipse sends Éclair and Lumière to assist the Nouvlesse quell a peasant revolt on the planet Aure. Éclair is conflicted between her duty to the GOTT and her moral outrage at the Nouvlesse mentality. When the Nouvlesse start to eradicate demonstrators, Éclair and Lumière defy their orders and attack the Nouvlesse army. As a result, they're erased from the GOTT files and declared fugitives.
12	"Frozen/Life"	January 7, 2003
On the run from the GOTT, Éclair and Lumière stop at a space station to obtain supplies. Their location is betrayed by Armbrust and they are ambushed by a small squad of marines. The marines releases the D-Command virus, which causes nearly kills them except for the intervention of Armbrust. Éclair and Lumière escape, but part company with Armbrust and are left alone and on the run.
13	"Conflict/Destiny"	January 14, 2003
Eclipse sends A-ou and Un-ou out to find and destroy Éclair and Lumière. They are confronted at a long abandoned space outpost; the outpost has special significance to all four ES members as they were on opposing sides there as well, many years past. A battle between the two takes place in space and on land, ending when both Lumière and A-ou badly injured. Éclair and Un-ou admit a truce to save their respective partners. They agree to part company and A-ou and Un-ou decide to become fugitives as well.
14	"Steel/Heart"	January 21, 2003
Éclair and Lumière go to a planet being terraformed to seek spare parts. ES members Tweedledee and Tweedledum reluctantly infect La Muse and Donnerschlag with the assassin program Hashish. They are forced to attempt to kill Éclair and Lumière, but when the girls immobilize them, they self-destruct. Devastated by the loss of their mechanical allies, the two decide to assault the GOTT headquarters.
15	"Break/Down"	January 28, 2003
Eclipse recalls all ES teams, but it is not sufficient to stop Éclair and Lumière infiltrating the GOTT headquarters. There are multiple showdowns, however the final scenes show Éclair and Lumière shooting Eclipse and blowing up the GOTT headquarters.
16	"Look/Back"	February 11, 2003
The episode shows in flashback what Éclair was like when she first woke up, her most recent body, without any of the memories from her past. Armbrust unveils from his perspective the events that have led to the GOTT building. Finally it is revealed that Éclair has been promoted to the role of Acting Chief of the GOTT.
17	"Phantasm/Reborn"	February 25, 2003
"Acting Chief Éclair" order Sinistra and Dextera to "train" the newest six teams of ES members who turn out to be clones of Éclair and Lumière. Later, the Acting Chief holds a press conference where she declares that GOTT will now be a more powerful force. Two of the clones try to rally against new policy but are forced into submission. Two mysterious motorcycle riders crash the press conference and speak out against the Acting Chief and GOTT before making their escape.
18	"Unmasked/Face"	February 25, 2003
The GOTT forces (including the new Éclair and Lumière clones) are mobilized to kill the two riders who easily evade their pursuers. Again, two of the clones disobey orders and so "Acting Chief Éclair" orders their termination. The masked riders intervene to save them and reveal themselves to be the original Éclair and Lumière, now in new bodies.
19	"Take/Revenge"	March 4, 2003
It is revealed that Alv and Dvergr had used their absorb abilities to take on Éclair and Lumière's powers and appearance. A prolonged fight ensues between the real Éclair and Lumière's and their clones against Alv and Dvergr. Eclipse, who survived assassination and resurrected Éclair and Lumière using her own special power, ultimately arrives and defeats Alv and Dvergr! Although they weren't meant to live for long, the clones are given their own ships as a reward for helping during the fight.
20	"Lost/Days"	March 4, 2003
Lumière lapses into a comatose state as she is having problems adjusting to her new body with several lifetimes of memories. Her dreams are a series of flashbacks detailing all the different lives Éclair and Lumière had. When she wakes, she realizes that she's lost her ability to control machines.
21	"Nouvlesse/Ark"	March 11, 2003
Chevalier D'Autrich, head of GOTT and GU's Minister of Finance is dismissed from both organizations by the Nouvlesse. The message is brought by Alv and Dvergr who survived but were disfigured in their prior battle against Eclipse, Éclair and Lumière. Chevalier steals the Nouvlesses' titanic spaceship, Deucalion.
22	"Demolition/Titan"	March 11, 2003
Alv and Dvergr confront Chevalier on Deucalion, but Alv is trapped inside the Reception System Chamber and turned into pure energy. Éclair and Lumière arrive on the Deucalion to confront Chevalier. He reveals his love for Éclair as his adoptive mother; he stole the Deucalion to foil the Nouvlesse plan to flee the galaxy (leaving it in economic ruin). Their reunion ends abruptly when Chevalier is shot by the ship's weaponry: Alv has actually merged with the Deucalion and has plans of her own for it.
23	"Annihilation/Zero"	March 18, 2003
Alv takes the Deucalion to destroy earth as her ultimate revenge against the Nouvlesse. She traps Éclair and Lumière within the Reception System and reduces them to energy. Outside, all of the ES members, the entire GOTT army, and all the clones join forces to attack the Deucalion before it can destroy Earth. While Alv tries to gather more energy from the sun's rays, Éclair and Lumière rematerialize.
24	"As Time Goes By"	March 18, 2003
The return of the girls is thanks to Lumière's true power: control over particles. However, Alv is still in control of Deucalion and a great danger. Dvergr reveals Alv's weakness and Éclair offers all of her energy up to Lumière to exploit it. Afterward, the remaining ships make short work of what's left. Dvergr joins her daughter as she dies, and Éclair looks on as Chevalier dies from his own wounds. In the end, Éclair and Lumière return to GOTT to continue the fight for galactic peace.
