= Edgar Brau =

Argentine writer, stage director and artist

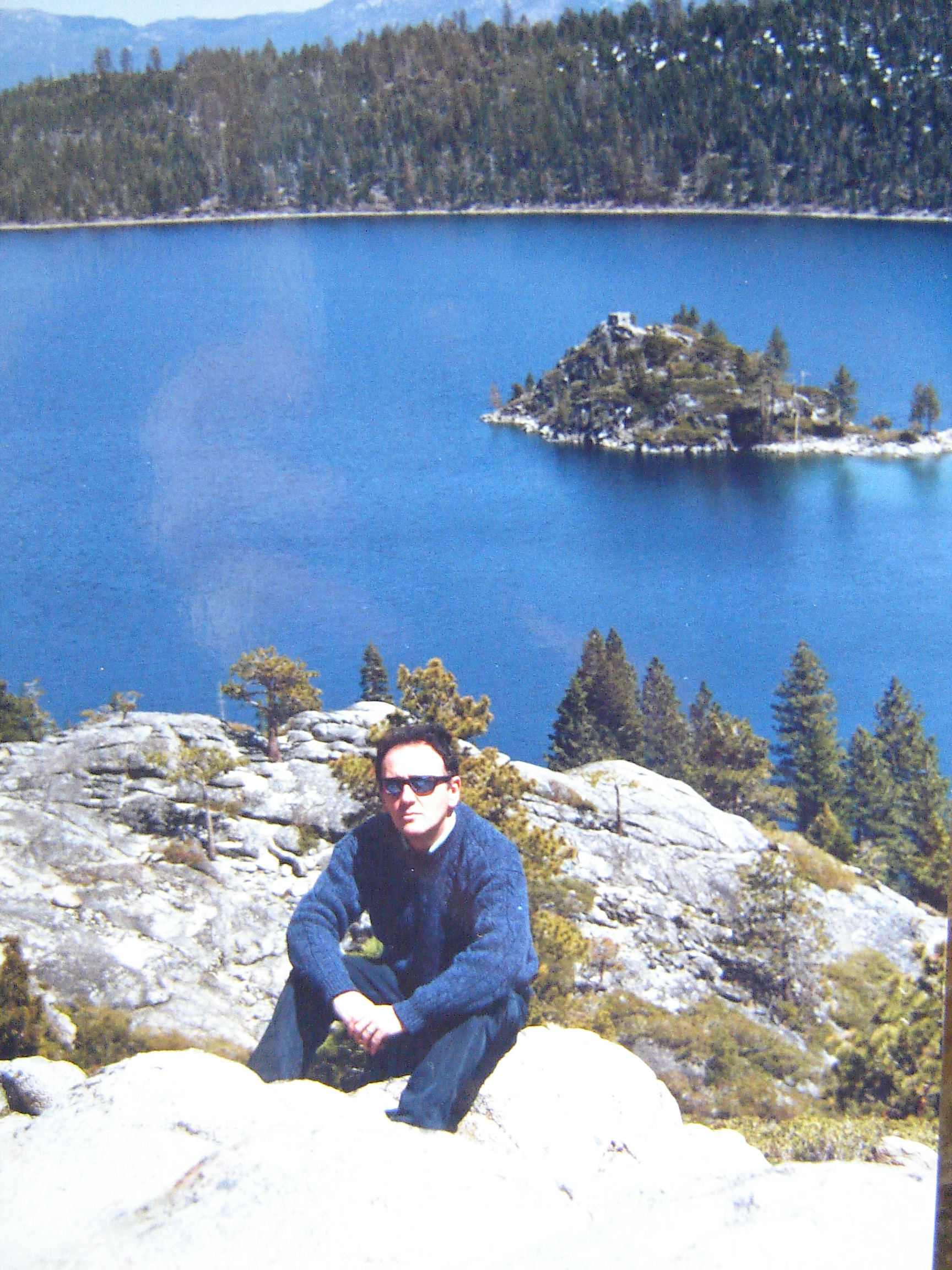
- Brau at Lake Tahoe. April, 2003
- Born: 1958 (age 67–68); Resistencia, Chaco, Argentina
- Occupations: Novelist, poet, playwright, actor and stage director, photographer, artist
- Writing career
- Language: Spanish
- Notable works: Suite argentina, El último Viaje del capitán Lemuel Gulliver, Casablanca, Faustus
- Website: edgarbrau.com

Edgar Brau (born 1958) is an Argentine writer, stage director and artist.

== Biography ==
Edgar Brau was born in Argentina. He engaged in different occupations: he was an actor, a stage director, a painter of icons, a photographer, until he completely devoted himself to writing literature. His two last performances, as actor and stage director, were A Season in Hell, by Arthur Rimbaud, and Malditos (“Damned Poets”), a dramatization he wrote based on poems by Gérard de Nerval, Charles Baudelaire, and Rimbaud.

His first book, The Poem and Other Stories, published in 1992, was included by the UNESCO in its Project for International Financing of Translations. Enrique Anderson Imbert, an eminent critic from Harvard University, referred to the author as “a poet of prose, with impressive imagination”, and predicted he would get a first place in Argentine literature. Rodolfo Modern, writer and secretary general of the Argentine Academy of Letters, wrote that Brau expresses himself in a language of “amazing richness and accuracy”.

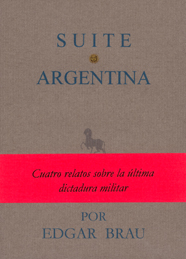
Suite argentina first Spanish edition

In 1995, he published his first novel, The Player. Between that year and 2000, two books of poems, three short story books and a novel were released. To this period belong Argentine Suite (a collection of four short stories based on the last Argentine military dictatorship, the National Reorganization Process) and Captain Lemuel Gulliver's Last Travel, a satire of present-day society, in which the character created by Jonathan Swift is shown on a fantastic travel (his “fifth” voyage) to the Río de la Plata, more precisely to a country that Gulliver calls Incognitahriah.

By mid 2000, the National Endowment for the Arts awarded professor Donald A. Yates, first American translator and editor of Jorge Luis Borges, a grant to translate all the work in prose written by Brau up to that year. Since then, Edgar Brau has been invited by different American universities and literary organizations to give seminars on his work and classes as Visiting Professor. Together with his translator, he also offered several bilingual readings on the West Coast.

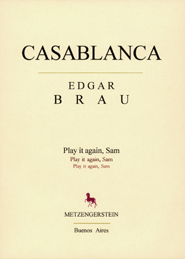
Casablanca first Spanish edition

In the Fall of 2002, during one of those stays, he wrote Casablanca, a novella in which a wealthy Argentine “estanciero” (ranch owner) builds a replica of Rick's café in the Argentine pampas, around the fifties, with the idea of recreating the famous film in real life. In this story, the unnamed protagonist, caught in a storm on a lonely road, takes a hitherto unnoticed turn and soon draws up at a group of Moorish-looking buildings. A battered tin sign out front says “Casablanca.” After parking, the driver seeks shelter in a shadowy room, glimpsing chairs and tables piled helter-skelter in the corners, just as a piano begins to play As Time Goes By. The piano player is an old black man, identical to Sam. By the wall opposite the piano, a man in dark glasses (his face seems familiar at first glance), a white jacket and black bow tie dozes, his chin resting on his chest. Somehow, the narrator has wandered into Rick's Café Americain from the film Casablanca. Before he leaves, the piano player will tell him the story of this place and of the people who lived and worked there, representing the movie characters.

Brau's first collection of works in English, entitled Casablanca and Other Stories, was published in the US by the end of 2006. The Washington Post published a lengthy review by Michael Dirda (“For the first time in English the Argentine labyrinths of Edgar Brau”) in which he states that Brau's works are further explorations of Borges´geography of the imagination. Writer and professor John T. Irwin, from Johns Hopkins University (author of The Mystery to a Solution: Poe, Borges, and the Analytic Detective Story), wrote that Brau's stories must be regarded in the same level as those by Edgar Allan Poe and Borges: “These brilliant and haunting stories, superbly translated —Irwin writes— will introduce American readers to a contemporary Argentine fiction writer of startling power and subtlety, a writer whose stories it is no overstatement to mention in the same breath with those of Poe and Borges”.

In January 2007, Words Without Borders, from Chicago, published Woodstock, a long poem by Brau based on the famous rock festival.

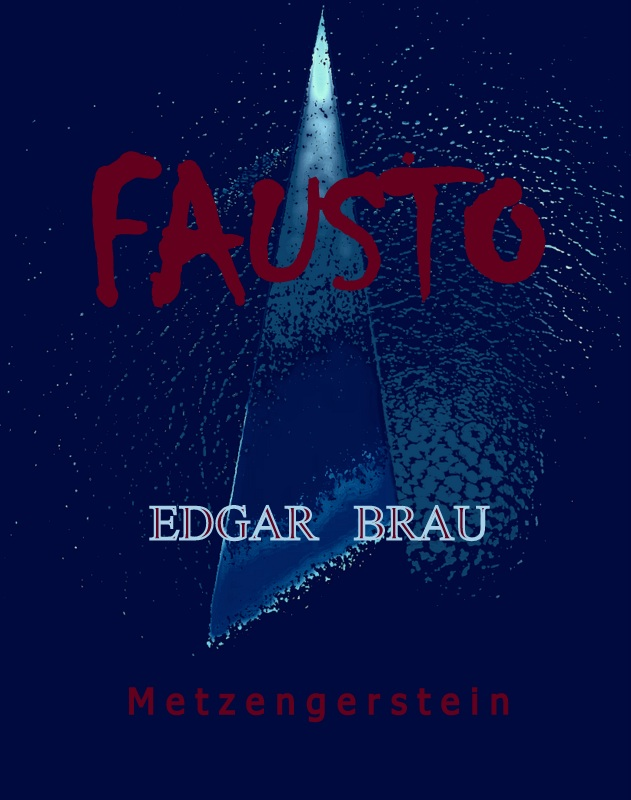
FAUSTO - Cover

Between 2009 and 2013 he wrote and published the following works: The Golem Project (El Proyecto Golem - Metzengerstein, October 2011), a story that takes place at an unspecified future date and narrates how the Israelis manage to bring Hitler back to life with his memory intact; The Child (El hijo – Metzengerstein, May 2012), a play about the theft of babies from political prisoners during the last Argentine military dictatorship; Faust (Fausto - Metzengerstein, December 2012), a play in which the character is now a bright Argentine biologist at Princeton, who, while considering the possibility of destroying the formula he has just discovered (which will enable man to live for a thousand years) is interrupted by the devil Mephistopheles, who has the mission of preventing that destruction; and Like Psalms (Como salmos - Metzengerstein, February 2013), twenty-six poems in which arguments with God and arguments about the existence of God build, through contradiction, a metaphysics in which the answer always seems to bring about a new question.

He also completed two suites of photographs and poems: A Wanderer´s Photo Album (Coghlan) and Woman in Syllables.

In January 2014 he published De lo que dura a lo que pasa (Metzengerstein), a series of eight interviews to the author made by Martina Rolandi Ricci, and in February of the same year, Gulliver´s Craft (El oficio de Gulliver - Metzengerstein), a novel written in 2012, which modifies and enlarges —from 60 to 350 pages— his earlier story based on Swift's character.

Edgar Brau lives in Buenos Aires.

== Books ==
- (1992) El Poema y otras historias (short stories). Antigua Librería de Marie Roget, Buenos Aires.
- (1995) El comediante (novel). Antigua Librería de Marie Roget, Buenos Aires.
- (1998) Tres cuentos (short stories). METZENGERSTEIN Ediciones, Buenos Aires.
- (1998) El Viaje (short stories). METZENGERSTEIN Ediciones, Buenos Aires.
- (1998) Dos historias fantásticas (two short stories). METZENGERSTEIN Ediciones, Buenos Aires.
- (1998) El último Viaje del capitán Lemuel Gulliver (novel). METZENGERSTEIN Ediciones, Buenos Aires.
- (1999) La Torre y Babel (poems). METZENGERSTEIN Ediciones, Buenos Aires.
- (2000) Suite argentina (four short stories). METZENGERSTEIN Ediciones, Buenos Aires.
- (2000) Mares de Ahab (poems). METZENGERSTEIN Ediciones, Buenos Aires.
- (2001) El fin de Cronos (Diaries 1999-2001). METZENGERSTEIN Ediciones, Buenos Aires.
- (2001) El sueño de Tiresias (poems). METZENGERSTEIN Ediciones, Buenos Aires.
- (2003) Casablanca (novella). METZENGERSTEIN Ediciones, Buenos Aires.
- (2005) Woodstock (a poem). NAPHTA & SETTEMBRINI, Buenos Aires.
- (2011) El Proyecto Golem (short stories). METZENGERSTEIN Ediciones, Buenos Aires.
- (2012) El hijo (a play). METZENGERSTEIN Ediciones, Buenos Aires
- (2012) Fausto (a play). METZENGERSTEIN Ediciones, Buenos Aires
- (2013) Como salmos (poems). METZENGERSTEIN Ediciones, Buenos Aires
- (2014) De lo que dura a lo que pasa (interviews). METZENGERSTEIN Ediciones, Buenos Aires
- (2014) El oficio de Gulliver (novel). METZENGERSTEIN Ediciones, Buenos Aires

== Works in English ==
- The Siesta. ELLERY QUEEN MYSTERY MAGAZINE, June 2000. Translated by Donald A. Yates.
- Bárcena's Dog. TWO LINES, 2001. Translated by Donald A. Yates.
- The Calendar. SOURCE, Spring 2002. Translated by Donald A. Yates.
- The Blessing. BEACONS, Number eight, 2002. Translated by Donald A. Yates.
- The Prisoner. THE LITERARY REVIEW, Fall 2002. Translated by Donald A. Yates.
- The Poem. NIMROD, Spring-Summer 2002. Translated by Donald A. Yates.
- The Journey. TWO LINES, 2003 Translated by Donald A. Yates.
- The Forgotten God. THE ANTIOCH REVIEW, Summer 2003. Translated by Donald A. Yates.
- The Child. THE LITERARY REVIEW, Winter 2004. Translated by Donald A. Yates.
- Casablanca and Other Stories. MSU Press, 2006. Translated by Donald A. Yates and Andrea G. Labinger.
- Woodstock. WORDS WITHOUT BORDERS, January, 2007. Translated by Michele McKay Aynesworth.
- The Journey. NEW WORLD, NEW WORDS, 2007. Recent Writing from the Americas. A Bilingual Anthology. Translated by Donald A. Yates.
- The Blessing. Argentina, A Traveler's Literary Companion. Whereabouts Press. Spring 2010. Translated by Donald A. Yates.
- The Golem Project. THE ANTIOCH REVIEW, Fall 2010. Translated by Andrea G. Labinger.
- The Key. WORDS WITHOUT BORDERS. Beyond Borges: Argentina Now. October, 2010. Translated by Donald A. Yates.
- Grimaldi´s Christ. THE DIRTY GOAT, Number 23, Fall 2010. Translated by Donald A. Yates
