= National Rhythm & Blues Hall of Fame =

American organization

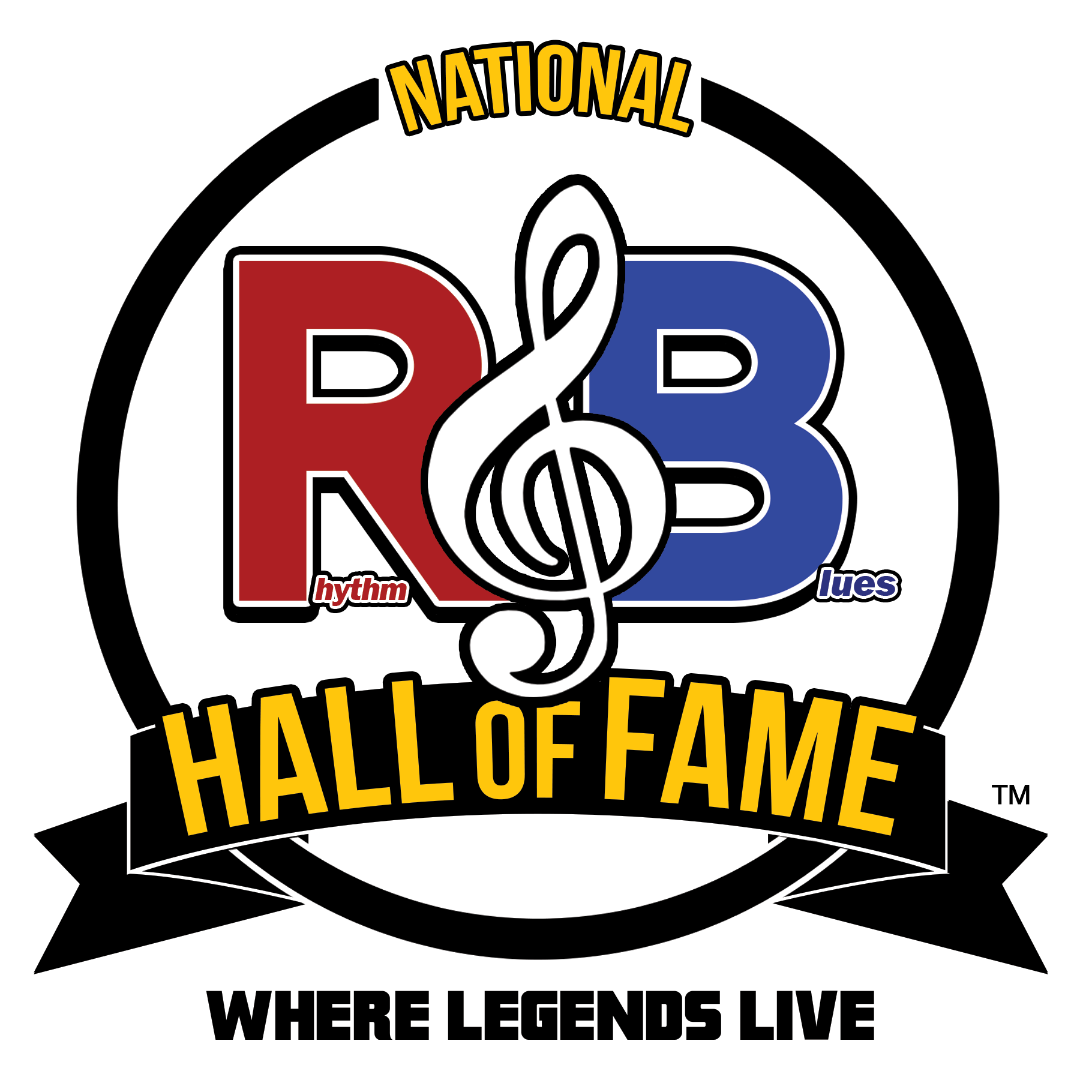
- Interior of the National Rhythm & Blues Hall of Fame
- Formation: January 30, 2010.
- Founded: 2010
- Founder: LaMont D. Robinson | Executive Director
- Purpose: Preserving and honoring the historical, cultural legacy, and contributions of R&B music.
- Location: United States
- Key people: Lamont "ShowBoat" Robinson, Founder/CEO and executive Director
- Website: https://rbhof.com

The National Rhythm & Blues Hall of Fame is an independent organization whose mission is to educate and to celebrate, preserve, promote, and present rhythm and blues music globally.

== History ==
The National Rhythm & Blues Hall of Fame was founded in 2010. Its name was originally the Official Rhythm & Blues Music Hall of Fame. It was founded and developed by American professional basketball player LaMont "ShowBoat" Robinson, who is also an R&B activist and an entrepreneur.

Robinson's love for R&B and soul music began at an early age. He would often attend music practice sessions with his musician uncle, a house band member at Leo's Casino, a night club in Cleveland, Ohio. It was one of the premier clubs in the Midwest during the 1960s for R&B, jazz, and African American comedians such as The Supremes, Marvin Gaye, Ray Charles, Redd Foxx, Flip Wilson, Richard Pryor and Otis Redding. Robinson's love for R&B inspired him to start collecting memorabilia and artifacts that reflected the history of the rhythm and blues era. Robinson collected many of these while traveling worldwide to play basketball with the Globetrotters and other teams.

Robinson's collection of memorabilia grew large enough to warrant display in a museum. He donated some of his collection to the Rock and Roll Hall of Fame in his hometown of Cleveland, Ohio, but he wanted to find a museum that exclusively displayed, celebrated, and collected information about the great accomplishments of R&B artists. Unable to find such a museum, he decided to create one himself. His efforts were supported by friends, some of whom were Rhythm & Blues and Jazz musicians.

A mobile museum debuted in February 2012. An annual Hall of Fame induction ceremony followed, honoring artists, non-musical individuals, venues, events, and other influences on the world of R&B music.

In 2022, a groundbreaking ceremony took place in Marks, Mississippi to start construction of a permanent location for the museum.

== Induction ceremonies ==
The Inaugural Rhythm & Blues Music Hall of Fame Induction Ceremony was held on August 17, 2013, at the Waetjen Auditorium at Cleveland State University in Cleveland. The first class of inductees included recording acts The Supremes, The Temptations, The Marvelettes, The O'Jays, Martha & The Vandellas (Martha Reeves, Rosalind Holmes, and Annette Helton), The Dramatics, Ruby & The Romantics, and The Dazz Band Featuring Jerry Bell and Little Jimmy Scott; historic venue Leo's Casino; international journalist Larry Cotton; and radio hosts Tom Joyner and Tim Marshall. On December 20, 2017, 17 names were added to the list of inductees as 20th Century Early Music Influences such as Sammy Davis Jr, Ruth Brown, Bill Haley, Louis Armstrong and others. On February 17, 2018, the Rhythm & Blues Hall of Fame founder LaMont "ShowBoat" Robinson, a lifelong Temptations fan and collector, gave a tribute concert for the late great Dennis Edwards. The performance was to honor him for all his musical work and for his family and fans in Detroit at Bert's Entertainment Complex. Edwards was inducted into the National Rhythm & Blues Hall of Fame in 2013 with The Temptations and in 2015 with his own group The Temptations Review featuring Dennis Edwards.

The National Rhythm & Blues Hall of Fame announced it would forgo its live induction ceremony honoring its 2020 class due to the COVID-19 pandemic. Founder and CEO LaMont Robinson stated the live induction ceremony would be replaced by an online salute honoring the class of 2020 inductees. The induction committee combined the 2020 and the 2021 class to create a special class of 16 inductees called the 2020 Posthumously Class of Pioneers.

In 2022 and 2023, the National Rhythm & Blues Hall of Fame held its induction ceremonies in Detroit, honoring artists such as New Edition and Aaliyah. In 2024, the event returned to Cleveland, Ohio—the birthplace of the Hall of Fame—on October 6. The sold-out ceremony celebrated the induction of R&B legends Jeffrey Osborne, Kenny Lattimore, Ginuwine, William Bell, Candi Staton, Regina Belle, and Frankie Beverly.

The 2018 and 2019 induction events were held at the Charles H. Wright Museum of African American History in Detroit.

Over the years, the National Rhythm & Blues of Fame inductions have taken place at the following locations:

| Date | Venue | Location |
|---|---|---|
| August 17, 2013 | Waetjen Auditorium Cleveland St. University | Cleveland, OH |
| August 24, 2014 | Palace Theatre | Canton, OH |
| June 6, 2015 | Clarksdale Civic Auditorium | Clarksdale, MS |
| October 4, 2015 | Charles H. Wright Museum Of African American History | Detroit, MI |
| August 21, 2016 | Ford Community & Performing Arts Center | Dearborn, MI |
| June 11, 2017 | Detroit Music Hall Center for the Performing Arts | Detroit, MI |
| June 3, 2018 | Charles H. Wright Museum Of African American History | Detroit, MI |
| June 23, 2019 | Charles H. Wright Museum Of African American History | Detroit, MI |
| August 29, 2020 | Online Announcement Due To COVID-19 | Detroit, MI |
| August 10, 2021 | Online Announcement Due To COVID-19 | Detroit, MI |
| September 30, 2022 | R&B Hall Of Fame Ground Site | Marks, MS |
| September 24, 2023 | The Hawk Center in Farmington Hills | Detroit, MI |
| October 6, 2024 | Marriott Cleveland East Music Hall | Cleveland, OH |
| October 26, 2025 | HOF Network | Detroit, MI |
| October 24, 2026 | Bert’s Music Theater | Detroit, MI |

== Members ==
| Name | Contribution | Year inducted |
|---|---|---|
| James Brown | Musician, singer, dancer | 2013 |
| Call and Post | Publication | 2013 |
| The Chi-Lites | Vocal group | 2013 |
| The Clovers | Vocal group | 2013 |
| Sam Cooke | Singer, songwriter, record label executive | 2013 |
| Larry Cotton | Journalist | 2013 |
| Dazz Band | Band | 2013 |
| The Dramatics | Vocal group | 2013 |
| The Dynamic Superiors | Vocal group | 2013 |
| Enchantment | Vocal group | 2013 |
| The Four Tops | Vocal group | 2013 |
| The Hesitations | Vocal group | 2013 |
| Jerry Bell | Singer | 2013 |
| Tom Joyner | Radio host | 2013 |
| Leo's Casino | Historic Venue (Cleveland, Ohio) | 2013 |
| Gerald Levert | Singer | 2013 |
| Little Jimmy Scott | Jazz artist | 2013 |
| Tim Marshall | Radio host, educator | 2013 |
| The Marvelettes | Vocal group | 2013 |
| The Ohio Players | Band | 2013 |
| The O'Jays | Vocal group | 2013 |
| Otis Redding | Singer | 2013 |
| Ruby & The Romantics | Vocal group | 2013 |
| David Ruffin | Singer | 2013 |
| Sly, Slick & Wicked | Vocal group | 2013 |
| Sounds of Unity and Love (S.O.U.L.) | Band | 2013 |
| Edwin Starr | Singer | 2013 |
| Barrett Strong | Songwriter | 2013 |
| The Supremes | Vocal group | 2013 |
| The Temptations | Vocal group | 2013 |
| Upbeat | TV show | 2013 |
| Martha and the Vandellas | Vocal group | 2013 |
| Kim Weston | Singer | 2013 |
| Jackie Wilson | Singer | 2013 |
| The Andantes | Vocal group | 2014 |
| Gene Chandler | Singer | 2014 |
| Chubby Checker | Singer | 2014 |
| The Delfonics | Vocal group | 2014 |
| The Fantastic Four | Vocal group | 2014 |
| The Funk Brothers | Musicians | 2014 |
| Marvin Gaye | Singer | 2014 |
| Macy Gray | Singer | 2014 |
| Whitney Houston | Singer | 2014 |
| Joe Jackson | Promoter, manager | 2014 |
| Michael Jackson | Singer & Songwriter | 2014 |
| B.B. King | Singer | 2014 |
| Norm N. Nite | Author, Radio Host | 2014 |
| Sweet Inspirations | Vocal group | 2014 |
| The Whispers | Vocal group | 2014 |
| Jazzi Anderson | Radio Host | 2015* |
| The Bar-Kays | Band | 2015* |
| Al Bell | Songwriter | 2015* |
| Millie Jackson | Singer | 2015* |
| Denise LaSalle | Singer | 2015* |
| Little Richard | Singer | 2015* |
| The Mad Lads | Vocal Group | 2015* |
| Dorothy Moore | Singer | 2015* |
| Little Junior Parker | Singer | 2015* |
| Elvis Presley | Singer | 2015* |
| Bobby Rush | Singer | 2015* |
| Stax Records | Record Company | 2015* |
| Ike Turner | Singer/Songwriter/Musician | 2015* |
| Muddy Waters | Singer/Musician | 2015* |
| WDIA | Radio Station | 2015* |
| Hank Ballard & The Midnighters | Vocal group | 2015** |
| JJ Barnes | Singer | 2015** |
| Ortheia Barnes-Kennerly | Singer | 2015** |
| Janie Bradford | Songwriter | 2015** |
| Jay Butler | Radio Host | 2015** |
| Jerry Butler | Singer/songwriter | 2015** |
| Ray Charles | Musician, bandleader | 2015** |
| Tony Clarke | Singer | 2015** |
| L.C. Cooke | Singer | 2015** |
| Sam Cooke | Songwriter | 2015** |
| The Contours | Vocal Group | 2015** |
| Melvin Davis | Singer | 2015** |
| Detroit Emeralds | Vocal Group | 2015** |
| The Fabulous Peps | Vocal group | 2015** |
| Aretha Franklin | Singer | 2015** |
| Chuck Jackson | Singer | 2015** |
| Laura Lee | Singer | 2015** |
| Pat Lewis | Singer | 2015** |
| Johnnie Mae Matthews | Singer, songwriter, producer | 2015** |
| The Miracles | Vocal group | 2015** |
| Melba Moore | Singer | 2015** |
| Martha Reeves | Singer | 2015** |
| Jimmy Ruffin | Singer | 2015** |
| Shades Of Blue | Vocal Group | 2015** |
| Donnie Simpson | Radio Host, TV music host | 2015** |
| The Spinners | Vocal group | 2015** |
| Johnnie Taylor | Singer | 2015** |
| Temptations Review Featuring Dennis Edwards | Vocal Group | 2015** |
| Spyder Turner | Singer | 2015** |
| The 20 Grand | Night club, concert venue | 2015** |
| Henry Tyler | Radio Host | 2015** |
| The Undisputed Truth | Vocal Group | 2015** |
| RJ Watkins | Radio Host | 2015** |
| Gino Washington | Singer | 2015** |
| Al Abrams | Public Relations | 2016 |
| Robert Bateman | Song Producer | 2016 |
| Bootsy Collins | Funk Legend | 2016 |
| Fats Domino | Singer & Songwriter | 2016 |
| The Falcons | Vocal Group | 2016 |
| Eddie Floyd | Singer & Songwriter | 2016 |
| Jimi Hendrix | Rock Legend | 2016 |
| Eddie Holman | Singer & Songwriter | 2016 |
| Cathy Hughes | Entertainment Mogul | 2016 |
| International Sweethearts Of Rhythm | Band | 2016 |
| Little Willie John | Songwriter | 2016 |
| Herb Kent | Radio Legend | 2016 |
| Bettye LaVette | Singer & Songwriter | 2016 |
| Miller London | Sales & Marketing Mogul | 2016 |
| Wilson Pickett | Singer & Songwriter | 2016 |
| Prince | Singer & Songwriter | 2016 |
| Sir Mack Rice | Singer & producer | 2016 |
| Smokey Robinson | Singer & Songwriter | 2016 |
| Sugar Chile Robinson | Child Prodigy | 2016 |
| The Royal Jokers | Vocal Group | 2016 |
| Rena Scott | Singer & Songwriter | 2016 |
| Mickey Stevenson | A&R Director | 2016 |
| The Velvelettes | Vocal Group | 2016 |
| Dionne Warwick | Singer & Songwriter | 2016 |
| Barbara Acklin | Singer & Songwriter | 2017 |
| Bert's Warehouse | Entertainment Complex | 2017 |
| Wade Briggs (Butterball Jr.) | Radio Personality | 2017 |
| Carl Carlton | Singer | 2017 |
| Dennis Coffey | Studio Musician | 2017 |
| Carolyn Crawford | Singer | 2017 |
| Bert Dearing | Nite Club Owner | 2017 |
| Charles Evers | Civil Rights Activist, Politician | 2017 |
| Foody | Radio Personality | 2017 |
| Fred Goree | Radio Personality | 2017 |
| Isaac Hayes & Hot Buttered Soul | Singer & Group | 2017 |
| The Impressions | Vocal Group | 2017 |
| Jeff & The Atlantics | Band | 2017 |
| Gladys Knight & The Pips | Vocal Group | 2017 |
| Skip Mahoney & The Casuals | Vocal Group | 2017 |
| The Manhattans | Vocal Group | 2017 |
| Sylvia Moy | Songwriter & producer | 2017 |
| Freda Payne | Singer | 2017 |
| Michael J. Powell | Producer & Musician | 2017 |
| Mitch Ryder | Singer | 2017 |
| The Valadiers | Vocal Group | 2017 |
| Mary Wells | Singer | 2017 |
| Louis Armstrong | Musician, Band Leader | 2017*** |
| Al Benson | Radio Host, Promoter, Civil Rights Activist | 2017*** |
| Ruth Brown | Singer | 2017*** |
| Sammy Davis Jr. | Singer | 2017*** |
| Bo Diddley | Singer | 2017*** |
| Ernie Durham | Radio Host | 2017*** |
| Ahmet Ertegun | Record Label Executive | 2017*** |
| Alan Freed | Radio Host | 2017*** |
| Bill Haley | Singer, Band Leader | 2017*** |
| Billie Holiday | Singer | 2017*** |
| Robert Johnson | Singer | 2017*** |
| Louis Jordan | Bandleader, musician, Singer | 2017*** |
| Johnny Otis | Bandleader, musician, Singer | 2017*** |
| Della Reese | Singer, actress | 2017*** |
| Martha Jean "The Queen" Steinberg | Radio Host, Minister | 2017*** |
| Jerry Wexler | Record Label Executive | 2017*** |
| Nat D. Williams | Radio Host | 2017*** |
| Marcus Belgrave | Musician | 2018 |
| Ken Bell | Radio Personality | 2018 |
| The Drifters | Vocal Group | 2018 |
| The Elgins | Vocal Group | 2018 |
| Brenda Holloway | Singer | 2018 |
| Ivy Jo Hunter | Songwriter & producer | 2018 |
| Little Anthony & The Imperials | Vocal Group | 2018 |
| Clay McMurray | Producer & engineer | 2018 |
| Motown Records | Record Company | 2018 |
| Peaches & Herb | Vocal Group | 2018 |
| Sam & Dave | Vocal Group | 2018 |
| Henry Washington | Promoter | 2018 |
| Richard "Popcorn" Wylie | Producer, songwriter, Singer | 2018 |
| Band Of Gypsys | Band | 2019 |
| Robert "Bumps" Blackwell | Producer | 2019 |
| Henry Cosby | Songwriter/Producer | 2019 |
| Don Davis | Producer | 2019 |
| Aretha Franklin | Songwriter | 2019 |
| Guy | Vocal Group | 2019 |
| H-Town | Vocal Group | 2019 |
| Eddie Kendricks | Singer | 2019 |
| Lady Champagne | Singer | 2019 |
| Mary Jane Girls | Vocal Group | 2019 |
| Stephanie Mills | Singer | 2019 |
| Ray Parker Jr. | Singer | 2019 |
| Phil Perry | Singer | 2019 |
| Lloyd Price | Singer | 2019 |
| The Righteous Brothers | Vocal Group | 2019 |
| Jimmy Roach | Producer/Songwriter | 2019 |
| The Rude Boys | Vocal Group | 2019 |
| The Tymes | Vocal Group | 2019 |
| David Washington | Radio Personality | 2019 |
| Keith Washington | Singer | 2019 |
| Stevie Wonder | Singer | 2019 |
| Otis Williams and the Charms | Vocal Group | 2019 |
| LaVern Baker | Singer | 2020 |
| Thomas "Beans" Bowles | Band Leader, Musician, Songwriter | 2020 |
| Nat King Cole | Band Leader, Singer | 2020 |
| Cab Calloway | Band Leader, Dancer, Singer | 2020 |
| Billy Eckstine | Singer | 2020 |
| The Famous Flames | Vocal group | 2020 |
| Ella Fitzgerald | Singer | 2020 |
| Harvey Fuqua | Songwriter, Record Producer, Singer | 2020 |
| Jack "The Rapper" Gibson | Radio Personality | 2020 |
| Hal Jackson | Radio Personality | 2020 |
| Mahalia Jackson | Gospel Singer | 2020 |
| Etta James | Singer | 2020 |
| Big Jay McNeely | Rhythm & Blues Saxophonist | 2020 |
| Lee Morgan | Jazz Trumpeter | 2020 |
| Charlie Parker | Jazz Saxophonist | 2020 |
| Royal Theatre | Music Venue | 2020 |
| Ed Sullivan | Variety Show Host | 2020 |
| Dinah Washington | Singer | 2020 |
| Bobby Bland | Singer | 2021 |
| Natalie Cole | Singer | 2021 |
| Dobie Gray | Singer | 2021 |
| Donny Hathaway | Singer | 2021 |
| John Lee Hooker | Blues Musician | 2021 |
| Ben E. King | Singer | 2021 |
| Harold Leonard | Radio Personality | 2021 |
| Little Walter | Blues Musician | 2021 |
| Teddy Pendergrass | Singer | 2021 |
| Dewey Phillips | Radio Personality | 2021 |
| Lou Rawls | Singer | 2021 |
| Danny Ray | MC | 2021 |
| Nina Simone | Singer | 2021 |
| Percy Sledge | Singer | 2021 |
| Billy Stewart | Singer | 2021 |
| Donna Summer | Singer | 2021 |
| Big Joe Turner | Singer | 2021 |
| Luther Vandross | Singer | 2021 |
| Johnny Watson | Singer | 2021 |
| Barry White | Singer | 2021 |
| Norman Whitfield | Songwriter, Producer | 2021 |
| Jerry Blavat | Radio Host | 2022 |
| The Dells | Vocal Group | 2022 |
| Eddie Floyd | Songwriter | 2022 |
| John Lee Hooker | Songwriter | 2022 |
| George W. Johnson | Singer | 2022 |
| Willie Mitchell | Singer, Bandleader | 2022 |
| Bobby Rush | Songwriter | 2022 |
| Carla Thomas | Singer | 2022 |
| Johnnie Walker | Music Executive | 2022 |
| Ernest Withers | Photojournalist | 2022 |
| Aaliyah | Singer | 2023 |
| Gerald Alston | Singer | 2023 |
| Ruby Andrews | Musician | 2023 |
| King Arthur | Radio Personality | 2023 |
| Brook Benton | Singer | 2023 |
| G.C. Cameron | Singer | 2023 |
| The Debonaires | Vocal Group | 2023 |
| Jermaine Dupri | Music Executive, Producer | 2023 |
| Gwen Foxx | Radio Personality | 2023 |
| Hall and Oates | Vocal Group | 2023 |
| The Independents | Vocal Group | 2023 |
| Linda Jones | Singer, Songwriter | 2023 |
| Clyde McPhatter | Singer | 2023 |
| Ronnie Nelson | Musician | 2023 |
| New Edition | Vocal Group | 2023 |
| Brooke Payne | Manager | 2023 |
| Mike Payne | Radio Personality | 2023 |
| Priscilla Price | Singer | 2023 |
| Raydio | Vocal Group | 2023 |
| Dee Dee Sharp | Singer | 2023 |
| Dusty Springfield | Singer | 2023 |
| The Stubbs Girls | Vocal Group | 2023 |
| Sweet Boogie Productions | Music Production, Venue | 2023 |
| Dee Dee Warwick | Singer | 2023 |
| Georgie Woods | Radio Personality | 2023 |
| William Bell | Singer | 2024 |
| Regina Belle | Musician | 2024 |
| Frankie Beverly | Singer, Songwriter, Record producer | 2024 |
| Boddie Productions Co. | Record Company | 2024 |
| Dale Edwards | Radio And Music Executive | 2024 |
| Ginuwine | Singer, Songwriter | 2024 |
| Ken Hawkins | Radio Personality | 2024 |
| Kenny Lattimore | Singer, songwriter | 2024 |
| Rose Marie McCoy | Songwriter | 2024 |
| Buddy Miles | Musician, Songwriter | 2024 |
| Jeffrey Osborne | Musician, Singer-songwriter | 2024 |
| Candi Staton | Singer-songwriter | 2024 |
| Terry Stewart | Music Executive | 2024 |
| Jae The Gospelkidd | Radio Host | 2024 |
| WABQ | Radio Station | 2024 |
| WJMO | Radio Station | 2024 |
| Gilbert Askey | Jazz Trumpeter | 2025 |
| The Cadillacs | Vocal Group | 2025 |
| Frankie Crocker | Radio Personality | 2025 |
| D'Angelo | Singer | 2025 |
| Patti Drew | Singer | 2025 |
| Dyke & The Blazers | Vocal Group | 2025 |
| Roberta Flack | Singer | 2025 |
| Rick James | Musician, Singer-songwriter | 2025 |
| Quincy Jones | Producer, Composer | 2025 |
| Angie Stone | Singer | 2025 |
| Sly Stone | Musician, Singer-songwriter | 2025 |
| Sister Rosetta Tharpe | Singer-songwriter | 2025 |
| Tina Turner | Singer | 2025 |
| Bill Withers | Singer-songwriter | 2025 |
| Bobby Womack | Singer-songwriter | 2025 |
| Brenton Wood | Singer | 2025 |
| Joe Von Battle | Record Producer | 2026 |
| Ernie Durham | Radio Host | 2026 |
| C. L. Franklin | Gospel Minister | 2026 |
| Erma Franklin | Singer | 2026 |
| Deon Jackson (singer) | Singer | 2026 |
| Ron Johnson (radio host) | Radio Host | 2026 |
| Barbara Lewis | Singer | 2026 |
| Ollie McLaughlin | Disc jockey, Record Label Executive | 2026 |
| Mr. Lee (radio host) | Radio Host | 2026 |
| Maxine Powell | Instructor | 2026 |
| Rudy Robinson | Singer-Songwriter | 2026 |
| The Scene | Venue | 2026 |
| WGPR-TV | Radio Host | 2026 |

* 2015 Induction ceremony in Clarksdale MI
** 2015 Induction ceremony in Detroit
*** Inducted as a 20th Century Early Music Influence

== Special awards and honors ==
| Name | Contribution | Type Of Award | Year presented |
|---|---|---|---|
| Ron Banks | Singer | Rhythm & Blues Music Lifetime Achievement Award | 2013 |
| Joe Jackson | Promoter, Manager | Rhythm & Blues Music Lifetime Achievement Award | 2014 |
| Jazzii Anderson | Radio Personality | Nat D. Williams Radio Personality of the Year Award | 2015* |
| Morgan Freeman | Actor | Rhythm & Blues Music Lifetime Achievement Award | 2015* |
| Christone "Kingfish" Ingram | Singer | Robert Johnson Rising Star Award | 2015* |
| Ground Zero | Blues Club | Juke Joint of the Year Award | 2015* |
| Joe Jackson | Promoter, Manager | Rhythm & Blues Humanitarian Award | 2015* |
| John Conyers Jr. | U.S. Congressman | Rhythm & Blues Music Lifetime Achievement Award | 2015** |
| Abdul "Duke" Fakir | Singer | Rhythm & Blues Living Legends Award | 2015** |
| Elliott S. Hall | Attorney | Rhythm & Blues Humanitarian Award | 2015** |
| Brenda Jones | Detroit Councilwoman | Ortheia Barnes Rhythm & Blues Visionary Award | 2015** |
| David Washington | Radio Personality | "Frantic" Ernie Durham & Martha Jean "The Queen" Steinberg Radio Personality of the Year Award | 2015** |
| Gene Chandler | Singer | Rhythm & Blues Music Pioneer Award | 2016 |
| Mildred Gaddis | Journalist | Rhythm & Blues Broadcast Journalist of the Year Award | 2016 |
| Cathy Hughes | Entertainment Mogul | Rhythm & Blues Living Legends Award | 2016 |
| John Mason | Radio Host | Rhythm & Blues Music Radio Personality of the Year Award | 2016 |
| The Supremes | Vocal Group | Rhythm & Blues Music Group of the 20th Century Award | 2016 |
| Foody | Radio Personality | "Frantic" Ernie Durham Radio Icon Award | 2017 |
| Joe Jackson | Promoter, Manager | Rhythm & Blues Hall Of Fame Music Business Pioneer Award | 2017 |
| Ziggy Johnson | Show Producer | Rhythm & Blues Hall Of Fame Legacy Award | 2017 |
| Brenda Lawrence | U.S. Congresswoman | Lamont D. Robinson Visionary Award | 2017 |
| Martha Reeves | Singer | Rhythm & Blues Hall Of Fame Icon Award | 2017 |
| Rev. Al Sharpton | Minister, Civil Rights Activist | Rhythm & Blues Hall Of Fame Lifetime Achievement Award | 2017 |
| The Temptations | Vocal Group | R&B Male Group of the 20th Century | 2017 |
| Marshall Thompson | Singer | Rhythm & Blues Hall Of Fame Living Legend Award | 2017 |
| The Chi-Lites | Vocal Group | Rhythm & Blues Group of the 21st Century | 2018 |
| Dennis Edwards | Singer | Rhythm & Blues Hall Of Fame Legends Award | 2018 |
| Aretha Franklin | Singer | Rhythm & Blues Hall Of Fame Icon Award | 2018 |
| Cornel West | Philosopher | Rhythm & Blues Hall Of Fame Living Legend Award | 2018 |
| Lloyd Price | Singer | National Rhythm & Blues Hall Of Fame Jackie Wilson Icon Legend Award | 2019 |
| Martha Reeves | Singer | National Rhythm & Blues Hall Of Fame Martha Reeves Music Ambassador Award | 2019 |
| Keith Rogers | Radio Personality | National Rhythm & Blues Hall Of Fame Tom Joyner Radio Personality Award | 2019 |
| Mary Wilson | Singer | National Rhythm & Blues Hall Of Fame Aretha Franklin Lifetime Achievement Award | 2019 |
| Bobby Rush | Songwriter | National Rhythm & Blues Hall Of Fame Blues Groundbreaking Legends | 2022 |
| Nen Bailey | Radio Personality | National Rhythm & Blues Hall Of Fame Tom Joyner Radio Personality Award | 2023 |
| Joe Billingslea | Singer, Songwriter | National Rhythm & Blues Hall Of Fame Living Legend Award | 2023 |
| Jerry Butler | Songwriter | National Rhythm & Blues Hall Of Fame Lifetime Achievement Award | 2023 |
| Billy Davis | Singer | National Rhythm & Blues Hall Of Fame Jackie Wilson Music Globe Award | 2023 |
| Dionne Warwick | Singer | National Rhythm & Blues Hall Of Fame Mary Wilson Icon Award | 2023 |
| Donna Wheelwright | Radio Personality | National Rhythm & Blues Hall Of Fame Tom Joyner Radio Personality Award | 2023 |
| Freddie Arrington | Master of Ceremony | Leo's Casino Music Icon Award | 2024 |
| Gene Chandler | Singer | Leo's Casino Music Icon Award | 2024 |
| Chuck Conway | Radio Personality | Leo's Casino Music Icon Award | 2024 |
| Eddie Floyd | Singer | Leo's Casino Music Icon Award | 2024 |
| The Temptations | Singing group | Leo's Casino Icon Award | 2024 |
| Marlon Kaufman | Executive | National Rhythm & Blues Hall Of Fame Mary Wilson Icon Award | 2024 |
| Dr. Fred Wheatt | Bandlander | Leo's Casino Icon Award | 2024 |
| The 20 Grand Revue - WPON 1460 AM | Radio Program | Radio Show of the Year Award | 2026 |
| Craig Strong (Judge) | Retired Judge & Civic Leader | Detroit Ambassador Award | 2026 |

* 2015 Induction ceremony in Clarksdale, MS
** 2015 Induction ceremony in Detroit
