= Every Day of My Life =

Every Day of My Life may refer to:

- Every Day of My Life, the autobiography of singer-songwriter Beeb Birtles
- Everyday of My Life (album), a 1976 album by Michael Bolton
- "Everyday of My Life", a 1976 song by Little River Band on the album After Hours
- "Ev'ry Day of My Life", a 1954 song recorded by Bobby Vinton
- Ev'ry Day of My Life (album), a 1972 album by Bobby Vinton
