= Ev'ry Day of My Life (album) =

Studio album by Bobby Vinton
- Released: May 1972
- Genre: Pop
- Label: Epic
- Producer: Jimmy Bowen, Jimmy Wisner, Billy Sherrill, Snuff Garrett

Bobby Vinton chronology
To Each His Own (1971)	Ev'ry Day of My Life (1972)	Sealed With a Kiss (1972)

Ev'ry Day of My Life was Bobby Vinton's twenty-second studio album, released in 1972. The title track and "I'll Make You My Baby" were album's two singles, the latter of which failed to make the Billboard Hot 100. Cover versions include "Misty Blue", "I Won't Cry Anymore", "Just a Little Lovin' (Early in the Mornin')", "I'll Make You My Baby" (a different version of Barbara Lewis' hit "Make Me Your Baby") and "And I Love You So".

== Track listing ==
No.	Title	Writer(s)	Length
1.	"Ev'ry Day of My Life"	Jimmie Crane, Al Jacobs	2:49
2.	"Let's Sing a Song"	Michael Gately, Robert John	2:58
3.	"Misty Blue"	Bobby Montgomery	2:13
4.	"I'm Comin' Home, Girl"	Linda Laurie	2:25
5.	"I Won't Cry Anymore"	Al Frisch, Fred Wise	3:36
6.	"Just a Little Lovin' (Early in the Mornin')"	Barry Mann, Cynthia Weil	2:40
7.	"I'll Make You My Baby"	Roger Atkins, Helen Miller	2:17
8.	"She Loves Me"	Bobby Vinton, Gene Allan	2:34
9.	"And I Love You So"	Don McLean	3:32
10.	"You Can Do It to Me Anytime"	Baker Knight	2:56
11.	"Whose Garden Was This"	Tom Paxton	3:12

== Album credits ==
- "Ev'ry Day of My Life" and "You Can Do It to Me Anytime" produced by Jimmy Bowen
- "Let's Sing a Song", "Just a Little Lovin' (Early in the Mornin')", "She Loves Me", "And I Love You So" and "Whose Garden Was This" produced by Jimmy Wisner with Jim "JR" Reeves
- "Misty Blue", "I Won't Cry Anymore" and "I'll Make You My Baby" produced by Billy Sherrill
- "I'm Comin' Home, Girl" produced by Snuff Garrett
- Background vocalists for "Misty Blue": the Nashville Sounds
- Background vocalists for "I Won't Cry Anymore": the Nashville Edition
- Engineering: Phil Macy, Charlie Bragg and Lou Bradley
- Recording engineer: Jim Reeves
- Mixing: Jim Reeves
- Sound supervision: Warren Vincent
- Front cover photo: Ivan Nagy
- Back cover photo: Wolf Wregin, Las Vegas News Bureau

== Charts ==
Album - Billboard (United States)

Year	Chart	Position
1972	Billboard Top LP's & Tape	72

Singles - Billboard (United States)

Year	Single	Chart	Position
1972	"Ev'ry Day of My Life"	The Billboard Hot 100	24
1972	"Ev'ry Day of My Life"	Billboard Easy Listening	2
