= Helena Symphony Orchestra =

Helena Symphony Orchestra (HSO)
- Orchestra
- official logo
- Founded: 1955
- Location: Helena, Montana
- Concert hall: Helena Civic Center
- Principal conductor: Allan R. Scott
- Website: www.helenasymphony.org

The Helena Symphony Orchestra (HSO) is an American orchestra based in Helena, Montana. Founded in 1955, the Helena Symphony plays the majority of its concerts at the grand Helena Civic Center and in the summer performs at Carroll College presenting their annual free Summer Symphony to thousands of listeners. The music director is Allan R. Scott.

== Concert season ==
=== Regular season ===
The Helena Symphony and Chorale performs ten concerts on average in a season that lasts from September to May. Three of those concerts include Christmas specials with a Cathedral of St. Helena performance and two performances of The Nutcracker with the Queen City Ballet in the Helena Civic Center.
