= Love Makes the World Go 'Round (Deon Jackson song) =

1965 song by Deon Jackson

Single by Deon Jackson
- B-side: "You Said You Loved Me"
- Released: December 31, 1965
- Genre: R&B; soul; pop
- Length: 2:27
- Label: Carla / Atco
- Songwriter(s): Deon Jackson
- Producer(s): Ollie McLaughlin

Deon Jackson singles chronology
"Love Makes the World Go 'Round" (1965)	"Love Takes a Long Time Growing" (1966)

"Love Makes the World Go Round" is a song written and performed by American singer-songwriter Deon Jackson, arranged and conducted by Dale Warren, and produced by Ollie McLaughlin. It was released on December 31, 1965.

== Background and composition ==
The song premiered on Robin Seymour's CKLW-TV station on its release date and was followed by immediate success on radio stations primarily in Ontario and Michigan (Jackson's native state) before becoming a nationwide success within the next month.

The 2-minute-27-second song is in the key of A flat major, with a tempo of 62 beats per minute. A vibraphone is used in the song.

In the lyrics, Jackson uses metaphors and hyperbole to express how much he feels "everybody needs love." Examples; "love makes the seesaws go up and down, makes trees grow tall, makes flowers grow in spring, makes the birds sing," and "makes people feel so fine ... makes people cry."

On the B-side is a song called "You Said You Loved Me."

== Reception and chart performance ==
The song was described by Billboard as a "happy, easy rhythm number by a good performer of Sam Cooke quality." Kal Rudman of Record World called it a "brilliant, happy arrangement." Cashbox called it a "sweet easygoing R&B tune with pretty romance lyrics, double-barrelled ork and vocal appeal."

The song debuted at number 32 on the Bubbling Under Hot 100 on the week of January 15, 1966 before debuting at number 99 on the Hot 100 the next week, peaking at number 11 and spending a total of 14 weeks on the chart, becoming Jackson's first charting song, highest charting song, and only Top 40 hit. He would eventually crack the Billboard charts on a few other occasions in the years following, with his singles "Love Takes a Long Time Growing," "I Can't Do Without You Baby," and "Ooh Baby," charting at numbers 77, 111 and 65 respectively. "Love Makes the World Go Round" also peaked at number 3 on the Hot R&B/Hip-Hop Songs chart.

== Notable cover versions and samples ==
- Kiki Dee's cover reached No. 87 on the Hot 100 in 1971.
- A cover by a band called Odds & Ends also appeared on the Hot 100 at No. 83 in 1971.
- The American singer, Barbara Lewis's, 1967 cover version is part of the soundtrack album for the 2015 American crime comedy-drama film, Focus, starring Will Smith and Margot Robbie.
- Janet Jackson sampled the song in "Strawberry Bounce", a cut from her 2004 album Damita Jo.
