= Roger Atkins =

American songwriter

Roger Jon Atkins (born 1944) is an American songwriter and lyricist. Among his most notable songs as a co-writer are "Make Me Your Baby" (written with Helen Miller and recorded by Barbara Lewis), "It's My Life" (written with Carl D'Errico and recorded by the Animals), and "Workin' On a Groovy Thing" (written with Neil Sedaka and recorded by the 5th Dimension).

== Biography ==
Born in New York, he was inspired in his early teens to write for musicals, after seeing The Music Man on Broadway. He began writing songs with Richard Costiera, and won a songwriting contract with Hill & Range music publishers. He then worked with Teddy Vann at Unbelievable Music, a company based at 1650 Broadway. His first major successes came in 1965, co-writing with Helen Miller the hit songs "Can't Let You Out of My Sight" by Chuck Jackson and Maxine Brown; "Make Me Your Baby", recorded by Barbara Lewis; and "Princess In Rags", recorded by Gene Pitney. He also wrote, with Carl D'Errico, the song "It's My Life", recorded by the Animals.

In the mid to late 1960s, Atkins worked as co-writer with Neil Sedaka.Their successful songs included "Kissin' My Life Away", recorded by the Hondells, and "Workin' On a Groovy Thing", first recorded by Patti Drew and later, with more success, by the 5th Dimension. Atkins also wrote the lyrics for "The Kind of Girl I Could Love", composed by Mike Nesmith and recorded by the Monkees.

The compilation album It's My Life: Roger Atkins Songbook, 1963–1969 was released in 2015.
