= Make Me Your Baby =

Single by Barbara Lewis
- B-side: "Love to Be Loved"
- Released: 1965
- Genre: R&B
- Length: 2:25
- Label: Atlantic
- Songwriter(s): Roger Atkins, Helen Miller
- Producer(s): Bert Berns, Ollie McLaughlin

Barbara Lewis singles chronology
"Baby I'm Yours" (1965)	"Make Me Your Baby" (1965)	"Don't Forget About Me" (1965)

"Make Me Your Baby" is a song written by Helen Miller and Roger Atkins. The most successful recording was a hit for Barbara Lewis in 1965.

== Background ==
The demo for "Make Me Your Baby" was cut by journeyman session singer Jean Thomas on 22 January 1965 at the behest of Atlantic Records president Jerry Wexler, who wanted to offer the song to Patti LaBelle and the Bluebelles, then a Cameo-Parkway act Wexler was hoping to woo over to Atlantic. Patti Labelle and the Bluebelles did eventually sign to Atlantic, but only after protracted negotiations (their debut label session being on October 7, 1965), which meant "Make Me Your Baby" was still unrecorded in the summer of 1965 when the success of "Baby I'm Yours" alerted Wexler to the suitability of "Make Me Your Baby" as a vehicle for the singer of "Baby I'm Yours," Barbara Lewis.

"Make Me Your Baby" was recorded by Lewis in a July 1, 1965, session at Atlantic Records Recording Studios (NYC) in which Lewis also recorded the B-side "Love to Be Loved" and a third track, "I'm So Afraid." ^{1} Like "Baby I'm Yours," "Make Me Your Baby" was produced by Ollie McLaughlin and Bert Berns, being described as "An Ollie McLaughlin production directed by Bert Berns." The arranger and conductor for the session was Artie Butler, with featured personnel on the session being Patti Brown (piano), Vinnie Bell, Al Gorgoni, Trade Martin (guitar), Bob Bushnell (electric bass), Gary Chester (drums), Ted Sommer, Alvin Rogers (chimes, tambourine). Prior to the release of the Barbara Lewis version, the song had been recorded by the Pixies Three, whose version had successfully been pitched to Cameo Parkway. However, before the relevant contract had been finalized, the Barbara Lewis single had begun to break, causing Cameo Parkway to opt out. The Pixies Three consequently disbanded.

== Chart performance ==
"Make Me Your Baby" was released as a single in September 1965 and that November matched the No.11 peak of her preceding hit, "Baby I'm Yours", as well as reaching No.9 on the Top Rhythm & Blues Singles chart.

== Other cover versions ==
- Barbara Lewis' "Make Me Your Baby" had an unsuccessful September 1965 release in the UK, where a local cover was cut by producer Shel Talmy with vocalist Liz Shelley. Released 10 September 1965 on Brunswick, this version also failed to chart, but, despite the advance of Lewis' version on the US charts, Shelley's single was given an American release by Decca Records.
- Bobby Vinton remade the song as "I'll Make You My Baby". Billy Sherrill produced the track which, as the lead single for the Ev'ry Day of My Life, reached No.30 on the Easy Listening chart in Billboard in April 1971, just missing the Billboard Hot 100 by peaking at No.101 on the Bubbling Under chart.
- "Make Me Your Baby" was covered in late 1975 in a disco style by Canadian singer Suzanne Stevens. Her version reached No.23 on Canada's RPM singles chart in December, 1975. Lewis' version had reached the top 10 in Canada in late 1965.
- Lewis's original version appeared on the soundtrack of Michael Apted's Stardust.
- ^{1} Lewis' recording of this Curtis Mayfield composition remains unreleased.
