= Tell Him =

Tell Him may refer to:

- "Tell Him" (Barbra Streisand and Celine Dion song), 1997
- "Tell Him" (Bert Berns song), a 1962 single by The Exciters, written by Bert Berns
- "Tell Him" (Carlton Black song), a 1963 song written by Carlton Black and recorded by several artists
- "Tell Him", a song by Shayne Ward from the album Breathless
- "Tell Him", a hidden track on the 1998 album The Miseducation of Lauryn Hill by Lauryn Hill
- "Loyal to Me", a song by Nina Nesbitt whose chorus begins "Tell him, tell him, tell him/I got somewhere else to be."

== See also ==
- Tell Her (disambiguation)
