= Matt Lucas (disambiguation) =

Matt Lucas (born 1974) is a British comedian, screenwriter, actor and singer.

Matt Lucas may also refer to:

- Matt Lucas (singer) (born 1935), American singer
- Matt Lucas (rugby union) (born 1992), Australian footballer

== See also ==
- Mat Lucas (born 1977), American voice actor
