= Workin' On a Groovy Thing (song) =

- Norwegian release picture sleeve

Single by The 5th Dimension

from the album The Age of Aquarius
- B-side: "Broken Wing Bird"
- Released: June 1969
- Genre: Sunshine pop
- Length: 3:09
- Label: Soul City
- Songwriters: Neil Sedaka, Roger Atkins
- Producer: Bones Howe

The 5th Dimension singles chronology
"Medley: Aquarius/Let the Sunshine In (The Flesh Failures)" (1969)	"Workin' On a Groovy Thing" (1969)	"Wedding Bell Blues" (1969)

"Workin' On a Groovy Thing" is a song written by Neil Sedaka and Roger Atkins which had its highest profile as a 1969 hit single by the 5th Dimension.

The song was first recorded by R&B songstress Patti Drew for her 1968 album Workin' on a Groovy Thing and released as a single to reach No. 34 on the U.S. R&B chart while crossing-over to No. 62 on the Billboard Hot 100 and reaching No. 86 in Canada. Future Steam frontman Garrett Scott - working with producer Paul Leka - and the 5th Dimension cut versions of the song in the summer of 1969. The 5th Dimension's version - released a week before Scott's - peaked at No. 20 on the Billboard Hot 100, No. 9 on the U.S. adult contemporary chart, and No. 15 on the U.S. R&B chart. Internationally the 5th Dimension version reached No. 18 in Canada and No. 48 on the Australia in 1969. Produced by Bones Howe and arranged by Bill Holman, Bob Alcivar, and Howe,"Workin' on a Groovy Thing" was included on the 1969 5th Dimension album, The Age of Aquarius.

"Workin' on a Groovy Thing" has also been recorded by Lana Cantrell (album Lana!/ 1968), Allison Durbin (album I Have Loved Me a Man/ 1968), Barbara Lewis (album Workin' on a Groovy Thing/ 1968), Friends of Distinction (album Highly Distinct/ 1969), Neil Sedaka (album, Workin' on a Groovy Thing/ 1969), and Alton Ellis (1972). Instrumental versions of the song include those by Richard Holmes (album Workin' on a Groovy Thing/ 1969), Phil Moore (album Right On/ 1969), David Rose (album Happy Heart/ 1969), Mongo Santamaria (album Workin' on a Groovy Thing/ 1969), Bola Sete (album, Workin' on a Groovy Thing/ 1970), and Johnny Hammond (album/ Breakout/ 1971).

The song was performed on the 1973 episode of The Partridge Family sitcom called "Maid in San Pueblo" but the Partridge Family version has never been released.

== Charts ==
=== 5th Dimension version ===
Chart (1969)	Peak position
Australia (Kent Music Report)	48
Canada RPM Adult Contemporary	2
Canada RPM Top Singles	18
U.S. Billboard Hot 100	20
U.S. Billboard Easy Listening	9
U.S. Billboard R&B Singles	15
U.S. Cash Box Top 100	23
