= Matt Lucas (singer) =

American musician (born 1935)

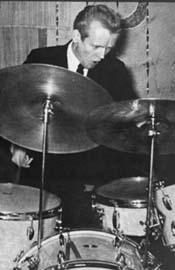
- Matt Lucas behind the drums in Missouri, 1957

Background information
- Born: July 19, 1935 (age 91); Memphis, Tennessee, United States
- Genres: Rock and roll, rhythm and blues, blues
- Occupations: Singer, songwriter, drummer
- Instruments: Vocals, drums
- Years active: 1955 – present
- Labels: BlueJam, Charly Records, Dot Records, Good, Karen, Quality, Redita, Renay, Smash, Ten-O-Nine, Underground

Matt Lucas (born July 19, 1935) is an American rock and roll, soul, and blues singer, drummer and songwriter. He is best known for his "rocked-up" version of the Hank Snow country classic "I'm Movin' On". He was inducted into the Rockabilly Hall of Fame in 1999, the International Rockabilly Hall of Fame in 2004 and the Southern Legends Entertainment & Performing Arts Hall of Fame in 2005.

== Early life ==
Born on July 19, 1935, in the General Hospital in Memphis, Tennessee, he grew up in Poplar Bluff, Missouri. At the age of seven, he discovered he was adopted when he found his adoption papers and a letter dated September 6, 1935 signed by the Assistant Superintendent Tennessee Children's Home Society Shelby County Branch.

His father worked for a theater chain in Poplar Bluff, which had three theaters: The Criterion, The Jewel, The Strand, and later The Rogers Theater. This gave him an opportunity to go to the movies for free. Watching MGM musicals along with attending church services turned him on to music.

At Mark Twain School, he played maracas in The Mark Twain Rhythm Band, and the drums soon became his passion. One of his favorite musicians at the time was Gene Krupa, who he greatly admired for his solos and showmanship.

== Musical influences ==
The first band he played with was the Ray Chilton Band, which featured five saxophones, an upright bass, a piano and drums and included Don (Chan), Glenn, Ray and Bill Chilton.

At night, he listened to the big bands from New Orleans, St. Louis and Chicago on the radio and pictured himself in those bigger cities. Several times, he tried to run away from Poplar Bluff, Missouri to pursue his dreams of becoming a great jazz musician and at age 14, he got into serious trouble when he took a cement mixer truck to run away from home. He was declared a juvenile delinquent and sentenced to a term in the Missouri Reformatory in Boonville, Missouri.

After 14 months, he returned home and went back to his musician friends in the black section of Poplar Buff, known as "The Holler". He drank, talked music, and sat in with some of the bands.

As soon as he was off parole, he tried his luck in Los Angeles, California, where his musical taste was influenced by frequent visits to Dolphin's Of Hollywood, a record shop which would become world-famous in Doo-Wop circles. The shop, located in Watts, Los Angeles, on the corner of Vernon and Central, featured a deejay by the name of Dick Hugg, nicknamed "Huggie Boy." He played records such as "Gee" by The Crows, "You're The One” by The Spiders, "Shake a Hand" by Faye Adams, and "Money Honey" by Clyde McPhatter.

== Rock and Roll ==
In 1955, when rock and roll began, he went back to Poplar Bluff where people immediately started ridiculing him due to his love for black music. He decided to move to St. Louis, Missouri, where he worked bars and night clubs including a stint at The Bamboo Key Club in East St. Louis, Illinois, where Ike Turner was the house band.

His next stop was The Bar X in Calumet City, Illinois, a suburb of Chicago notorious for gangster activity. He worked from 8 at night until 5 or 6 in the morning playing backup for strippers and singing blues tunes he made up as he went along. After a few months he moved back to southeast Missouri where he started playing a variety of jobs in jazz trios, country bands and rock & roll bands.

In July 1956, while playing a gig at the El Morocco Club in Gideon, Missouri, he met a local singer by the name of Narvel Felts who had started to build himself a reputation as an Elvis-type rocker. In late 1956, they ended up in the same band when Jerry Mercer, leader of the band for which Felts sang, fired drummer Bob Taylor and Felts recommended Lucas for the job.

In 1959, he met up with Narvel Felts again when he was asked to audition for a new trio that Narvel was about to form after the breakup of his "Narvel Felts and The Rockets" band. His experience in drumming in a wide variety of musical styles landed him the job and he started in 1960 as the drummer for the Narvel Felts Trio, which also featured J.W. Grubbs on stand-up bass and Narvel Felts on lead guitar. The Narvel Felts Trio played across the Missouri/Arkansas/Illinois area from real dives like the Starlight in Lepanto, Arkansas, to honky-tonks in Missouri and strip joints in Cairo and Chester, Illinois.

== "I'm Movin' On" ==
Lucas was soon asked to sing a couple of songs during each set in order to broaden the trio's repertoire, and he reverted to the blues and R&B he had learned during his years as a drummer in the clubs of East St. Louis and Calumet City. In addition to songs like "Annie Had A Baby" and "Hoochie Coochie Man", he started playing around with Hank Snow's 1950 country hit "I'm Movin' On" changing some of the lyrics and adding lines like "wind it up baby" and "shake it for your daddy" and " I'm gonna ride that train tonight". The song became a crowd favorite and convinced him he had a potential hit on his hands.

In the summer of 1961, while Narvel Felts was serving six months in the US Army Reserve, he stayed in Memphis playing drums for Bill Rice and Jerry Foster as well as doing studio work. Sometime during those six months he recorded "Trading Kisses / Sweetest One" at the Fernwood Studios in Memphis with Alvy Browning on bass, Bill Rice on piano, himself on drums and Roland Janes on guitar. The latter also produced the record and released it on his Good Records label.

In late 1962, he recorded "I'm Movin' On" in the Sonic Sound Studios in Memphis, at the end of a Narvel Felts session. The song was initially released on Renay Records, a label owned by Roland Janes. The deejays loved it; the only problem was they liked the B-side "My Heavenly Angel". In an effort to kill the record, a "It's Different – It's A Hit – I'm Movin' On by Matt Lucas" stamp was applied to the sleeves and sometimes the record itself. The reaction was swift and devastating "The record is too wild and crazy and we don't want to play this nigger music on our white radio station".

Eventually, he visited WDIA radio, the top black radio station in Memphis at the time, where he played the record for Rufus Thomas who really liked it and added it to the stations playlist. A second disc jockey instrumental in breaking "I'm Movin' On' was Dick "Kane" Cole on WLOK. The airplay on the black stations forced white stations like WHBQ WHBQ to add the song to their playlist too.

He wanted more than a local hit in Memphis and on recommendation by Rufus Thomas he went to the number 1 R&B radio station in the world, WLAC in Nashville, Tennessee. John R., the station's top disc jockey, took one listen to the Renay single and immediately referred Matt to Zenas Sears of WAOK radio in Atlanta, Georgia. Bob McKee, a disc jockey at that station, played it over the phone for a contact at Mercury Records in Chicago which resulted in the release on Smash Records and a monster hit.

The record sold 50,000 copies in Detroit alone. It was a big hit in Canada as well and it was released in Europe on Smash, Belinda, Philips and several other labels. In August 1963 the Belgium Teen magazine "Juke Box" listed the single as "promising" and one month later it entered the Belgium hitparade at #10. In October it moved to #8 and in November it peaked at #6. The November 1963 Juke Box Hit Parade reveals an even higher listing (#4) in the French-speaking Southern part of Belgium. All in all, it was a genuine worldwide smash pop hit. Stateside it officially peaked at 56 in Billboard and 45 in Cashbox but locally it was much bigger especially in the Southern markets.

The Narvel Felts Trio now became the Matt Lucas Trio with Matt as the featured vocalist occupying front center stage with his drum set and Narvel Felts on lead guitar and J.W. Grubbs on bass standing behind him on the sides.

Roy Orbison's "Ooby Dooby" was selected as the follow-up single. He gave the Orbison rocker the "I'm Movin' On' treatment starting it with the classic line "Hey baby this is Matt Lucas, come on out on this dance floor I want to tell you about something that is brand-new, and I made it up baby and I am doing it just for you and here it is…Hey Baby”.

The record came out on Smash Records and it started off the same way as "I'm Movin' On". Radio stations were reluctant to play it and the single never attained the success of "I'm Movin' On".

A second attempt at a follow-up hit involved Chuck Berry’s “Maybellene”. The recording took place at the Roland Janes studio in Memphis, Tennessee with Travis Wammack on guitar, Jamie Isonhood, a talented Jerry Lee Lewis type piano pumper from Jackson, Mississippi, on keyboard and Fred Carter on bass. It was released on DOT Records and basically went nowhere.

== Blue Eyed Soul wonder ==
Frustrated by the lack of success he started thinking about moving North to Canada and an offer from Harold Kudletts, the man responsible for bringing Rock & Roll to Canada, sealed the deal. The move meant the end of the Matt Lucas trio since the other members had too many roots in Southern Missouri.

For his next record, he left the formula of taking an established song adding his own drum beat to it and throwing in some extra lyrics. "Turn on Your Lovelight" a Bobby Blue Bland hit from 1961 was recorded in Memphis with the same people as "Maybellene" with the organ at the end dubbed in. The record basically saw no chart action and was largely ignored by both black and white radio.

In 1965, he briefly returned to the States when he was contacted by Ollie McLaughlin, producer/manager of Del Shannon, Barbara Lewis and later The Capitols. Ollie had taken a liking to him when he visited Detroit during the promotion of "I'm Movin' On” and he was asked to come up with a song to hook in on a dance craze, which was big in Detroit. The dance was called The Twine and a single by Alvin Cash & The Crawlers called "Twine Time" was a big hit.

He wrote “The Motor City Twine” and recorded Part 1 & 2 of the song at United Sound in Detroit with the finest Motown players. The single topped the R&B charts in Detroit but remained a local hit. The second release on Karen, "Baby You Better Go-Go" was also recorded at United Sound but it failed to chart, and he moved back to London, Ontario. (Note: the record later became a mega rare Northern Soul hit in the U.K.

== Canada ==
Ronnie Hawkins added Lucas as a second drummer to his band for several one-nighters where he shared the stage with regular drummer Levon Helm.

In the early 1970s, he started rebuilding his career with some success. In 1971, he made the cover of the prestigious The Globe and Mail Magazine and appeared on the Pierre Burton Show, while CBC TV did a special on him called "Return of a Singer".

In 1972, Gene Lees, a Canadian composer and editor of the jazz magazine Down Beat, who had just started a new record label called Kanata Records, offered to cut a blues album on him and his band. Recorded at Sound Canada Studios the album, "I Paid My Dues", produced the single "I'm Movin' On" / "The Old Man" which became a double-sided hit in Canada, reaching just below the Top 20.

In 1974, he returned to Ollie McLaughlin in Detroit and recorded "You've Gotta Love" backed with a song called "I'm So Thankful". Musicians on the session included Minnie Ripperton, Donnie Hathaway, and Phil Upchurch. The single was released in 1974 or 1975 on Quality Records, Canada's largest independent record company. The record became a hit in Canada, and also appeared on an album called "Disco mania" with songs by acts like Van McCoy, Gloria Gaynor and The Ohio Players.

== Caribbean ==
In 1975, he had a near fatal heart attack. He received an offer to go on tour with Buck Owens starting in Toronto, Ontario. The same day he also received a call from Sid Rudeau in Tampa, Florida. Sid had The Bellamy Brothers and Jim Stafford and he offered him a job at the Rodeway Inn in Baton Rouge, Louisiana. Hoping the move to a warmer climate and different surroundings would enhance his chances of making a full recovery from his heart attack, he left Canada and started spreading his brand of Rock & Roll and Blues music amongst the cajuns.

After working the club circuit in Louisiana for a while, he received a call from his agent asking him if he would be interested in playing at "Frenchmen's Reef", the number one resort hotel in St. Thomas on the Virgin Islands. He took the offer and ended up spending a little over 2 years there working 6 nights a week. Eventually, he moved back to St. Petersburg, Florida where he had bought a home and started working hotel chains like Holiday Inns and Supper Clubs always working 6 nights a week.

Around 1980, he accepted an offer for a job on a cruise ship. This turned out to be an excellent career move, as he knew how to work the crowds who took to the seas to have a good time. He re-released several albums/cassettes with titles that clearly reflect two musical personalities. There were two volumes of "The Memphis Rock & Rollin' Rock-A-Billy" filled with old rockers like "Memphis", "Blue Suede Shoes", "Don't Be Cruel" and "Breathless". Then, there were "Matt Lucas Sings for Lovers" and "Matt Lucas Sings Duke Ellington" featuring standards like "Solitude", "Caravan", "Try A Little Tenderness" and "When I Grow Too Old To Dream". (Most of this material had originally been recorded in the late 1960s).

Other cruise lines started offering him engagements giving him a long steady period of employment while making good money. A few years earlier, he had fallen in love with a girl in Pittsburgh and after some arm-twisting, he convinced her to join him on the cruise lines as a tour director. Together, they worked several cruise ships out of Miami, Ft. Lauderdale and Cape Canaveral, Florida.

In 1990, he became Steamboat Director for the Delta Queen Steamboat Company, and his wife tour manager, together they cruised the Mississippi River from New Orleans to Minneapolis/St. Paul and the Ohio River from St. Louis to Pittsburgh, Pennsylvania, on the Mississippi Queen.

== 21st century ==
He has continued performing, starting with a trip to Scandinavia in 2000 followed by appearances at The Rockabilly Hall of Fame Introduction Show in Jackson, Tennessee (2000), The Hemsby Rock 'N' Roll Weekender in Hemsby, Norfolk England (2001), The Ponderosa Stomp in New Orleans, Louisiana (2004, 2005, 2006, 2007), American Music Magazine Show, Sweden (2005) and various other small festivals.

Recording wise, there were new CDs in 2001 "Shockabilly", "I'm Movin' On & Other Timeless Rockers" on Redita Records of The Netherlands and "Back In The Saddle Again" on Ten O Nine Records out of Chicago. The Redita release features all his old Rock & Roll songs as well as some interesting tracks from the sixties/seventies. "Back In The Saddle Again" features all new songs and was recorded with the James Burton on guitar and Charlie Musselwhite on harmonica. One of the new songs is a new recording of his biggest hit, now titled "I'm Still Movin' On" :

"It was back in 63 when the great Hank Snow inspired me to start movin' on, start rolling on.
He said they can do you no wrong, if you don't stay too long, keep moving on.
Well you know Hank now he is dead and gone, Carl Perkins and Elvis well they sang their songs,
they've all moved on, yes they've all moved on.
'But old Matt's having fun and keeps rocking along 'cause I'm still movin on."

== Discography ==
=== Singles ===
1962

Tradin' Kisses / Sweetest One (Good 003)

1963

I'm Movin' On / My Heavenly Angel (Renay 304)
I'm Movin' On / My Heavenly Angel (Smash 183)
Ooby Dooby / No One Like You(Smash 1840)
Maybellene / Put Me Down (Dot 16564)

1964

Turn On Your Lovelight / Water Moccasin (Dot 16614)

1965

The M.C. Twine Pt 1 / The M.C. Twine Pt 2 (Karen 321)
Baby You Better Go-Go / My Tune (Karen 2524)

1972

The Old Man / I'm Movin' On (Kanata 1008)
The Old Man / Bathtub Blues / I'm Movin' On (Kanata Kan 9)

1975

You Gotta Love / I'm So Thankful (Quality 2129)
I Need Your Lovin' / Zoo Blues (Quality 2159)

1977

Put Me Down / Tom Cat Blues (CJG 504)

1981

I'm Movin' On / Maybellene (Underground 3001)

1982

Peepin' Tom Blues / Newsman Blues (Underground 3002)

2011

Shake It (3246) (one sided single on blue vinyl)

2012

You Better Go Go (Made in Detroit) (one sided single)

=== Albums, cassettes and CDs ===
1968

The Memphis Rock & Rollin' Rock-A-Billy Vol. 1 (Memphis Legends 1931) CST
The Memphis Rock & Rollin' Rock-A-Billy Vol. 2 (Memphis Legends 1932) CST

1972

"I've Paid My Dues" (Kanata KAN 9) LP

1973

Matt Lucas Sings Duke Ellington (All Star 1015) LP
Matt Lucas Sings For Lovers (All Star 1016) LP

1979

The White Blues Wonder (Bluejam BJS 1001) LP

1983

A Legend In His Time : Back With The Blues (Bluejam BJS 1002) LP (CD 401)
The Chicago Session (Congo CS 1935) LP
Sings The Hits (Bluejam 2020) LP
Ride That Train Tonight (Charly 30222) LP

2000

Paying My Dues (Bluejam 7777) LP
Original Hits (Bluejam 7797) CD
Rockabilly 2000 Vol 1 (Bluejam CD 100)
Rockabilly 2000 Vol 2 (Bluejam CD 200)

2001

Shockabilly

2002

I'm Movin' On & Other Timeless Rockers (Redita 146) CD

2006

Back In The Saddle Again (Ten-O-Nine TN8379) CD

2007

Music To My Momma's Ears (Ronjen SKU070827) CD
