= Motown Memories With Sweet Pea =

American radio program

- Running time: Friday’s 5-8 PM (EST)
- Country of origin: United States
- Language: English
- Home station: WMEL
- Hosted by: Patricia "Sweet Pea" King
- Original release: 2013 – present
- Audio format: Stereophonic
- Website: motownmemorieswithsweetpea.com

Motown Memories With Sweet Pea is a weekly three-hour radio program that plays songs from the Motown record label. Hosted by Patricia “Sweet Pea” King, Motown Mermories With Sweet Pea is heard on WMEL, and is produced in the Bronx, New York.

== History ==
The show debuted on October 7, 2013, on WMEL under the name of Motown Memories with Sweet Pea and ran until December 20, 2015. The premier show included as guest the Motown singer Kim Weston.

From late December 2015 until September 2016, the show aired on 1 Essence Radio. After programming disagreements with 1 Essence Radio, the show returned to WMEL from September 2016 until September 14, 2018, then again returned on July 7, 2023.

== Format ==
The Motown Memories With Sweet Pea, features the songs and history from the Motown label during the 1960s. Musicians such as Marvin Gaye, The Marvelettes, Four Tops, Martha Reeves & The Vandellas are showcased along with lesser known artists such as Shorty Long, Kim Weston, and Brenda Holloway.

== Host ==
Patricia “Sweet Pea” King has hosted Motown Memories With Sweet Pea since its premiere on October 7, 2013. She is the author of the book Bedford Street Memories (Living On My Block In The ‘60s) and has written and directed three plays: The Interview, Wake Up Call, and By Faith, On Purpose.

King is the founder and CEO of Patricia Sweet Pea Washington's Star Legacy Award (originally called Patricia Sweet Pea Washington's Walk Of Fame) which honors less well-known musicians. Some of the first inductees from 2020 were Mary Wilson of the Supremes, songwriters Janie Bradford and Holland Dozier Holland, The Delfonics, The Marvelettes, The Funk Brothers, and The Andantes. The Star Legacy Award also awards in the categories of DJs, Radio Personalities, Music Historians, and Music Innovators.

In February 2001, King founded and is currently the CEO of Sweet Boogie Productions. In 2023, Sweet Boogie Productions received induction into the National Rhythm & Blues Music Hall Of Fame.

== Interviews ==
Notable interviews featured on Motown Memories With Sweet Pea include:

- Mary Wilson of the Supremes
- Katherine Anderson (The Marvelettes)
- Dennis Bowles (son of Thomas “Beans” Bowles)
- Johnny Bristol Jr.
- G.C. Cameron
- Louvain Demps (The Andantes)
- Candi Ghantt (The Mary Jane Girls)
- The Original Vandellas
- Vickilyn Reynolds
- Claudette Robinson
- Pam Sawyer
- William "Mickey" Stevenson
- Kim Weston
