= Suzanne Stevens =

Canadian singer

Suzanne (Denise) Stevens (born 1950) is a Canadian singer, based in Montreal and active during the 1970s and 1980s. She won the Juno Award for Most Promising Female Vocalist of the Year in 1975. Her best-known song is a disco-styled remake of the 1965 Barbara Lewis hit "Make Me Your Baby".

She was a receptionist until her successful performance on a Montreal talent show launched her recording career. Stevens performed in both English and French.

She was also host of the Global Television musical variety series For Lovers Only which began in September 1978 and featured lounge pianist Lou Snider.
