= Workin' on a Groovy Thing (Neil Sedaka album) =

Studio album by Neil Sedaka
- Released: 1969
- Recorded: Festival Records; Sydney, Australia
- Genre: Pop
- Length: 39:55
- Label: Festival, MCA
- Producer: Neil Sedaka, Pat Aulton

Neil Sedaka chronology
Smile (1965)	Workin' on a Groovy Thing (1969)	Oh Carol (1970)

Alternate cover

Workin' on a Groovy Thing is a 1969 studio album by the American pop singer Neil Sedaka. Recorded while Sedaka was touring Australia that year, it was a one-off recording for the Sydney-based label Festival Records; by that time his career had slumped, and his contract had not been renewed by his former label in the USA, RCA Victor. It was recorded in Festival's studios in Sydney, and was co-produced by Sedaka and Festival house producer Pat Aulton, with John Farrar taking care of the musical arrangements. The LP featured notable Australian session players of the period, including guitarist Jimmy Doyle (later a member of jazz-rock band Ayers Rock) and veteran jazz musician John Sangster.

In the United Kingdom, the album was released on the MCA label under the title Sounds of Sedaka.

== Track listing ==
=== Side one ===
No.	Title	Length
1.	"Puppet Man"	3:52
2.	"Johnny Walker, Old Grandad, Jackie Daniels and You"	3:18
3.	"Ebony Angel"	4:21
4.	"Wheeling, West Virginia"	3:31
5.	"You with Darkness on Your Mind"	3:22
6.	"The Love of a Woman"	3:28

=== Side two ===
No.	Title	Length
7.	"Workin' On a Groovy Thing"	4:01
8.	"The World I Threw Away"	2:58
9.	"Don't Look Over Your Shoulder"	2:28
10.	"Cellophane Disguise"	2:39
11.	"The Girl I Left Behind"	3:06
12.	"Summer Symphony"	2:51

== Personnel ==
- Neil Sedaka – vocals, piano
- Alan Turnbull – drums
- Len Hutchingson – bass
- Jim Doyle, Mal Clarke – guitars
- Mal Cunningham – piccolo & flute
- John Sangster – percussion
- Alan Nash, Bob McIvor – brass section leaders
- Gordon Bennett, Lal Kuring – string section leaders
- John Farrar – arrangements

== Singles ==
In Australia, one single was released, "Wheeling, West Virginia", which reached No. 20 on the Australian pop chart in 1970. "The Love of a Woman" served as the B-side.

In the UK, "Ebony Angel" was released as a single, with "Puppet Man" as its B-side.

== Reissue ==
This album itself has not been reissued since its original 1969 release, but its contents are available as tracks 15-26 of the second disc of the 2002 compilation album, Let the Good Times In.
