= Rama Records =

- Founded: 1953
- Country of origin: United States
- Location: New York City

Rama Records was a record label founded by George Goldner in 1953 in New York City. It recorded doo-wop groups such as The Crows and The Harptones.

Its third release was the one-hit wonder, the song "Gee," by the doo-wop group, The Crows Goldner was able to improve production techniques without destroying the innocent sounds of the early groups. "Gee" has been called the first rock and roll record because it was an original recording, unlike "Crying in the Chapel" by the Orioles.

The label was eventually sold to Roulette Records.

== See also ==
- List of record labels
- Rama
- Record-Rama
