= Helen Miller (songwriter) =

American songwriter (1925–2006)

- Born: June 30, 1925
- Died: February 2, 2006 (aged 80)

Helen Miller (30 June 1925 – 2 February 2006) was an American songwriter. She collaborated with several lyricists, notably Howard Greenfield in the early 1960s, and with him wrote several pop hits, including "Foolish Little Girl" by The Shirelles, and "It Hurts To Be In Love" by Gene Pitney.

== Biography ==
She started as a songwriter in New York City in the late 1940s, working in particular with lyricist and poet Fay Manus. She had some success at that time, but following her marriage to Irving Miller she left the music business for several years and brought up three children.

In 1961, she met Don Kirshner of Aldon Music, and restarted work as a songwriter in the Brill Building, working mainly on pop songs for a teenage audience. Around the same time, she also managed a doo-wop group, The Quotations, and won them a recording contract with Verve Records. At Aldon Music, she collaborated with Howard Greenfield - who was over ten years her junior - and they co-wrote a number of chart hits, including "Foolish Little Girl" by The Shirelles and "Charms" by Bobby Vee, both in 1963. The pair wrote "It Hurts To Be In Love" and recorded it with Neil Sedaka, but his record company, RCA, refused to release it as it had not been recorded in their own studios. Greenfield and Miller then had Gene Pitney record new vocals over the original backing track; the record was issued on Pitney's Musicor label, and became a top ten hit in 1964.

Miller also collaborated successfully with other writers. She wrote a number of songs at Aldon with soul singer and songwriter Freddie Scott. Working with Roger Atkins in 1965, she co-wrote both "Make Me Your Baby" for Barbara Lewis and "Princess In Rags" for Gene Pitney, and the same year co-wrote "All Of My Life" with Tony Powers, for Lesley Gore. She later worked at Metromedia, and in 1971 co-wrote, with lyricist Estelle Levitt, the BMI award-winning song "Don't Say You Don't Remember", a hit for Beverly Bremers. In 1974, she co-wrote, mostly with Rose Marie McCoy, several songs on Sarah Vaughan's album Send In The Clowns. Miller and Atkins also wrote "Water" which was a minor hit for Geno Washington & the Ram Jam Band in 1966.

Miller had a love of rhythm and blues music. In 1971, she collaborated with poet and lyricist Eve Merriam to write a "lively, R&B-influenced" score for the musical Inner City, which was conceived by Tom O'Horgan who had previously directed Hair and Jesus Christ Superstar. Based on Merriam's widely banned book The Inner City Mother Goose, the show had a successful run of 97 performances on Broadway. It was described as "the musical that rocked Broadway with its distinctly untraditional take on modern urban life," with Miller's music being compared to that of The Chi-Lites.

Miller retired to Florida with her husband in the 1980s. She died in Broward County in 2006, at the age of 80.
