= Tell Her =

Tell Her may refer to:

- "Tell Her" (Lonestar song), 2000
- "Tell Her" (Rizzle Kicks song), for the 2014 Wimbledon Championships with a video featuring Maria Sharapova.
- "Tell Her", song by The Brook Brothers G. Brook, R. Brook 1961
- "Tell Her", song by Seona Dancing Gervais, Macrae 1983
- "Tell Her", Jesse McCartney song from his 2006 album Right Where You Want Me
- "Tell Him" (Bert Berns song), originally recorded as "Tell Her" in 1962 by Johnny Thunder
- Tell Her (film), a 2020 Russian children's drama film

== See also ==
- Tell Him (disambiguation)
