= Gee (The Crows song) =

1953 single by The Crows

Single by the Crows
- B-side: "I Love You So"
- Released: March 1953
- Recorded: February 1953
- Genre: Doo-wop, rock and roll
- Length: 2:14
- Label: Rama
- Songwriters: William Davis, Viola Watkins
- Producer: George Goldner

The Crows singles chronology
"Gee" (1953)	"Heartbreaker" (1953)

"Gee" is a song by the American R&B and doo-wop group the Crows, released in June 1953. The song has been credited as the first rock and roll hit by a rock and roll group. It is a doo-wop song, written by William Davis and Viola Watkins, and recorded by the Crows on the independent label, Rama Records, at Beltone Studios in New York City in February 1953. It charted in April 1954, one year later. It took a year to get recognized on Your Hit Parade. It landed No. 2 on the rhythm and blues chart and No. 14 on the pop chart. It was the first 1950s doo-wop record to sell over one million records. Recorded on an independent label, it was one of the first such R&B records to crossover to the wider pop market. Some, including Jay Warner, consider it as the first of the "rock and roll records".

== Song ==
The song starts with a few bars of wordless vocals:

duh-duda-duh-duda-duh-duda-duh-duh-duba

followed by the lead vocal;

Oh-ho-ho-ho gee, my oh-oh gee-hee, well oh-ho gee, why I love that girl.

then the group:

Love that girl!

The vocals are upbeat making use of harmonies and nonsense syllables, in a manner resembling enthusiastic street-corner singing. This is accompanied with a modified jump blues instrumental backup, a catchy melody, and Charlie Christian-like guitar solo.

== History ==
The Crows formed in 1951 as a typical street corner doo-wop group and were discovered at Apollo Theater's Wednesday night talent show by talent agent Cliff Martinez, and brought to independent producer George Goldner who had just set up tiny new independent Rama Records label.

The Crows were the first group signed and the first to record. The first songs they recorded were as back-up to singer and pianist Viola Watkins. The song "Gee" was the third song recorded during the first recording session, on February 10, 1953. It was put together in a few minutes by group member, William Davis, with Viola Watkins also being credited as co-writer. Watkins also played piano on and co-arranged the song. It has been suggested that the guitar break, based on the traditional Scottish tune "The Campbells Are Coming", may have been played by session guitarist Lloyd "Tiny" Grimes.

The song was first released as the B-side of a ballad, "I Love You So". However, radio stations began turning it over and playing "Gee", first in Philadelphia and later in New York and Los Angeles. By January 1954 it had sold 100,000 copies, and by April entered the national R&B and pop charts, rising to number 2 R&B and number 14 pop. Although the song became a huge hit in early 1954, a year after it was recorded, the Crows were a one-hit wonder, as none of the follow-up records released had any chart success. The group broke up a few months after "Gee" dropped off the Hit Parade.

== Legacy ==
The Crows were one of the first doo wop groups and one of the first "bird" groups. "Gee" was one of the first rock and roll hit records. It has also been called the first rock and roll record because it was an original composition and had a quick dance beat.

Although the Orioles' song "Crying in the Chapel" is frequently called the first R&B record to crossover to a big white audience, it is actually a cover of a country song. "Gee" and its B-side "I Love You So" are considered seminal, as it is an original song by an all but amateur group. It encapsulated all that has been written later about neighborhood kids singing on corners, and retains an amateurish feel.

According to Bruce Eder at AllMusic:

"Gee" by the Crows walked in on in the spring and summer of that year [1953], and the music world was never the same. There would be better records than "Gee," even from Goldner's labels, but it was recognized as the first R&B single to get a significant part of its sales and chart success from purchases by white teenagers - the first rock & roll single.

== Covers ==
American surf rock duo Jan and Dean released the song in 1960 on their album, The Jan & Dean Sound.

The Hollywood Flames released a version of the song as a single in 1961 that reached number 26 on the US R&B chart.

The Pixies Three (Mercury 72250) with lead vocal by Debby Swisher, reached number 87 on Billboard and number 79 on Cashbox in 1964.

The Beach Boys recorded a brief, idiosyncratic adaptation of the song as part of the unfinished concept album Smile. It was included on Brian Wilson's 2004 solo recording of the album in medley with "Our Prayer" as the introductory piece to "Heroes and Villains".

Frank Zappa's The Mothers of Invention played the song some times during their first European Tour (September–October 1967). A live recording can be found on Frank Zappa's official bootleg live album 'Tis the Season to Be Jelly included in the first volume of the collection of bootleg recordings entitled Beat the Boots released in July 1991.

== In popular culture ==
- The Crows' recording features in the American Crime fiction film Kitten with a Whip (1964).
- The Crows' recording features in the American coming-of-age comedy-drama film American Graffiti (1973).
- The Crows' recording features in the American teen musical romantic comedy film Cry-Baby (1990).
