= Leo's Casino =

Influential Cleveland nightclub

Coordinates: 41.5038°N 81.6366°W

- Address: 7500 Euclid Avenue; Cleveland, Ohio; U.S.
- Owner: Leo Frank, Jules Berger
- Seating type: 700
- Type: Nightclub

Construction
- Opened: 1963
- Closed: 1972

Leo’s Casino was a legendary nightclub and live music venue located at 7500 Euclid Avenue in Cleveland, Ohio. Operating from 1963 to 1972, it became one of the most influential venues in the Midwest for Soul music, R&B, Motown, and Jazz artists. The club was widely recognized as a key stop on the Chitlin' Circuit and one of Cleveland's most racially integrated entertainment spaces. The venue played a major role in forging Cleveland’s identity as a center for Motown and R&B music, regularly hosting top touring acts and helping launch the careers of young performers. Motown founder Berry Gordy broke new artists by having them play Leo's, reasoning that if they could succeed in Cleveland, they likely would do well at venues elsewhere in the U.S. including the Apollo Theater.

== Notable performers ==
Between 1963 and 1972, Leo’s Casino featured many of the most prominent performers in soul, R&B, Motown, and jazz, including:

- Smokey Robinson and The Miracles
- Jackie Wilson
- Marvin Gaye
- Ray Charles
- Dionne Warwick
- The Supremes
- The Temptations
- Four Tops
- Stevie Wonder
- Aretha Franklin

At one point club owners Leo Frank and Jules Berger managed The O'Jays, who were regular performers at the club. The venue also served as an early platform for comedians such as Richard Pryor, Flip Wilson, and Redd Foxx, who performed regularly at the club.

Jazz performers who appeared at Leo's Casino included John Coltrane, Dizzy Gillespie, and Cannonball Adderley

== Cultural significance ==
Leo’s Casino became known as one of the most racially integrated nightclubs in the United States. Comedian and activist Dick Gregory once called it “the most fully integrated nightclub in America.”

During the 1966 Hough riots, hundreds of fans—Black and white—waited in line to see The Supremes perform just blocks from the unrest. The club briefly closed after police ordered the cancellation of a third show that night but reopened four weeks later with a performance by Ray Charles.

Otis Redding gave his final performance at Leo’s Casino on December 9, 1967, the night before his fatal plane crash.

== Legacy ==
In 1999, the Rock and Roll Hall of Fame designated the former site of Leo’s Casino as a historic rock ’n’ roll landmark and installed a commemorative plaque.

The venue remains a significant part of Cleveland’s musical and cultural history, frequently referenced in local histories, oral accounts, and retrospectives on the city’s Motown era.
