= The Pixies Three =

American teenage vocal girl group

- Origin: Hanover, Pennsylvania, U.S
- Genres: Pop
- Years active: 1957–1965; 1991–2010; 2015–present
- Labels: Mercury Records

The Pixies Three are an American teenage vocal girl group formed in Hanover, Pennsylvania, in 1957 by schoolmates Debbie Swisher and Kaye McCool. They are known for their early 1960s hit songs “Birthday Party” and “442 Glenwood Avenue”.

== History ==
=== Formation (1957) ===
Having performed in local shows since 1955, the trio of Midge Bollinger (lead vocals), Kaye McCool (low vocals), and Debra Swisher (high vocals) were signed to Mercury Records in 1963 by producer-songwriters John Madara and Dave White, who had discovered the group at a show in Philadelphia (among the group’s previous successes were two appearances on the Ted Mack Amateur Hour).

=== Initial run and success (1957–1965) ===
Their debut single, "Birthday Party" was a huge success locally and made the Top 40 nationally (The b-side, "Our Love" was written by Kaye). After their second single, “442 Glenwood Avenue" / "Cold, Cold Winter” (in which both sides charted), Midge Bollinger left the group and was replaced by Bonnie Long, who assumed the high vocals while Debby Swisher became the new lead vocalist. The first single by the revamped line-up was a remake of The Crows’ 1954 R&B hit "Gee". This was followed by their debut album, Party With The Pixies Three, an early rock and roll concept album based on a Friday after-school party. The album did not chart, but it has become an often sought-after item amongst record collectors.

Throughout 1964, the girls found themselves touring on several packages with The Dave Clark Five and Bobby Vee and others. On June 17 that year, they appeared at Pittsburgh's West View Park with Bobby Goldsboro and other performers in a concert headlined by The Rolling Stones, who were on their first American tour.

The girls' fourth single caused some controversy upon its release. "The Hootch" (with live audience dubbed in) was intended to be a new dance concept. However, it was revealed that "hootch" was a slang term for "booze", so disc jockeys started playing the B-side, "It’s Summertime U.S.A", which became the A-side.

The Pixies Three continued into 1965 with two more singles, "Orphan Boy" and "Your Way". A few unreleased demos followed, then the girls graduated from high school and went their separate ways. The following year, lead singer Swisher made a solo single: a remake of The Beach Boys’ “You’re So Good To Me”, backed with remake of The Angels’ “Thank You And Goodnight”. Coincidentally, she joined The Angels shortly thereafter, replacing Toni Mason as lead vocalist.

=== Later years and reunions (since 1991) ===
In 1991, The Pixies Three performed for the first time in 25 years at their high school reunion. This led to a "second run" for the group which lasted until 2010, releasing six CD's and performing several times a year in and around their hometown as well as Ohio, New England, and along the Atlantic coast. Three years later in June 2013, the original trio of Debby Swisher Horn, Kaye McCool Krebs and Midge Bollinger Neel reunited in their hometown for its 250th-anniversary celebration as well as the 150th anniversary of the Battle of Hanover and the 50th anniversary of their first single "Birthday Party". In 2015, the original trio reunited again for a new CD, Timeless, released in December.

== Members ==
- Midge (Bollinger) Neel (1957–1964, 2000–2010, 2015–present; born December 29 in Hanover, Pennsylvania)
- Bonnie (Long) Walker (1964–1965, 1991–2010; born September 6 in Hanover)
- Kaye (McCool) Krebs (1957–1965, 1991–2010, 2015–present; born October 1 in Uniontown, Pennsylvania)
- Debra (Swisher) Horn (1957–1965, 1991–2000, 2015–present; born February 26 in Hanover)

== Discography ==
=== Singles ===
Year	A-side/B-side Both sides from same album except where indicated	Label & number	Charts			Album
Year	A-side/B-side Both sides from same album except where indicated	Label & number	Billboard	Cashbox	CHUM	Album
1961	"Sincerely" b/w "Graduation Time"	Reco-Art Sound acetates (shown as "The Pixies")	-	-	-	Unreleased
1961	"I Don't Care" b/w "Tell Me"	Reco-Art Sound acetates (shown as "The Pixies")	-	-	-	Unreleased
1963	"Birthday Party" b/w "Our Love" (Non-album track)	Mercury 72130	40	48	-	Party With The Pixies Three
1963	"442 Glenwood Avenue" / "Cold Cold Winter" (Non-album track)	Mercury 72208	56; 79	51 -	9 -	Party With The Pixies Three
1964	"Gee" b/w "After The Party"	Mercury 72250	87	79	-	Party With The Pixies Three
1964	"It's Summertime U.S.A." b/w "The Hootch"	Mercury 72288	116	-	-	Non-album tracks
1964	"Orphan Boy" b/w "Love Walked In"	Mercury 72331	-	-	-	Non-album tracks
1965	"Your Way" b/w "Love Me, Love Me"	Mercury 72357	-	-	-	Non-album tracks
1966	Debra Swisher solo single: "You're So Good To Me" b/w "Thank You and Goodnight"	Boom 60001	-	-	-	Non-album tracks

=== Studio albums ===
- Party With The Pixies Three (Mercury MG-20912 (Mono)/SR-60912 (Stereo) - Winter 1964)
- Now And Then (1995)
- Vintage Pixies (Originally released Winter 1999, re-released with different cover in Summer 2000)
- Our History (2001)
- Tribute To The Girl Groups (2001)
- 40 Years...and counting (2003)
- Dance The Night Away (2005)
- Timeless (December 2015)
