= Patti Drew =

American pop singer (1944–2025)

Background information
- Born: Eherene Patricia Drew; December 29, 1944; Charleston, South Carolina
- Died: June 16, 2025 (aged 80)
- Occupation: singer
- Labels: Capitol

Eherene Patricia "Patti" Drew (December 29, 1944 – June 16, 2025) was an American pop singer who achieved brief success in the late 1960s.

== Life and career ==
Drew was born in Charleston, South Carolina and grew up in Nashville, Tennessee and Evanston, Illinois. She sang in church with her sisters, Lorraine and Erma at Mount Carmel Baptist and Bethel African Methodist Episcopal. Drew's mother worked for Capitol Records executive Maurice Lathouwers, who heard Drew and her sisters sing in a church service and signed the group as the Drew-Vels. They first recorded "Tell Him" which was written by Carlton Black (and not to be confused with "Tell Him" by The Exciters) and featured Black on the record singing bass. The single release was a local pop and R&B hit in 1964, and entered the 'Billboard' pop chart the same year. Two follow-up singles also in 1964 did well in Chicago, "It's My Time" and "I've Known." By 1965 the group had broken up.

Patti Drew signed as a solo artist to Quill Records in 1965 and soon after moved up to Capitol, issuing a new recording of "Tell Him," It was the first of three charting singles on Capitol. She released four albums before leaving the industry in 1971, though she recorded a one-off single in 1975 and sang locally in Evanston in the group Front Line in the 1980s.

Drew died on June 16, 2025, at the age of 80. She is survived by her son Eric. In September 2025, Drew was selected for induction into the National Rhythm and Blues Hall of Fame and was slated for induction in October.

== Discography ==
=== Albums ===
- Tell Him (Capitol, 1967)
- Workin' On a Groovy Thing (Capitol, 1968)
- Wild Is Love (Capitol, 1969)
- I've Been Here All the Time (Capitol, 1969)
- The Best of Patti Drew: Workin’ on a Groovy Thing (Stateside, 2007)

== Singles ==
Year	Title	Chart Positions	
Year	Title	Billboard Hot 100	US R&B Singles
1964	"Tell Him" (The Drew-Vels)	89	-
1967	"Tell Him"	85	22
1968	"Hard to Handle"	93	40
1968	"Workin' On a Groovy Thing"	62	34
1969	"The Love That a Woman Should Give to a Man"	-	38
1969	"Hundreds of Guys"	-	-
1968	"Keep on Movin'"	-	-
1967	"My Lover's Prayer"	-	-
