= Summer Symphony =

- 45 RPM side label

Single by Jack Gold Sound
- B-side: "Lilacs"
- Released: August 1970 (U.S.); July 1971 (re-release)
- Genre: Jazz, Pop
- Length: 2:44
- Label: Columbia
- Songwriter(s): Neil Sedaka, Howard Greenfield
- Producer(s): Jack Gold

Jack Gold Sound singles chronology
"It Hurts to Say Goodbye" (1969)	"Summer Symphony" (1970)

"Summer Symphony" is a song written by Neil Sedaka and Howard Greenfield. It was arranged by John Farrar and produced by Pat Aulton. The song was used on the album Sounds Of Sedaka, a UK issue of the 1969 album, Workin' On A Groovy Thing recorded for Festival Records of Australia.

As the early 60s came to an end, Neil’s last Hot-100 entry in the decade was “The Answer to My Prayer” in 1965. In 1968 he recorded “Star Crossed Lovers” in Australia and re-energized his career with a #1 hit there. The following year he recorded a full album in Australia with arrangements by John Farrar, who went on to guide the career of Olivia Newton-John.

“Summer Symphony” was a track on the album and was one of seven tracks written with Sedaka’s long-time collaborator, Howard Greenfield. Together they wrote some of his biggest hits, including “Breaking Up Is Hard to Do” in 1962.

A number of tracks from this album were recorded by other artists; “Summer Symphony” was recorded by Lesley Gore on Mercury (1969). It was a non-album single, however, it used as the B-side of Gore's medley hit, "98.6/Lazy Day" (U.S. AC #38).

== Jack Gold Sound cover ==
"Summer Symphony" was also covered by songwriter and producer Jack Gold in 1970. His rendition reached #10 on the U.S. Easy Listening chart in the summer of 1970. The following summer the song was re-released and became a hit again, reaching #34. It was included on a compilation LP, Make The Music Play (Neil Sedaka's Songwriting Gems 1963-1971).

== Other versions ==
In 1972, The Society of Seven recorded another lyricized version with Tony Ruivivar on lead vocals. It was featured on their LP Simply Ourselves.

== Chart history ==
Chart (1970)	Peak position
U.S. Billboard Adult Contemporary	10
Chart (1971)	Peak position
U.S. Billboard Adult Contemporary	34
