= Tell Him (Carlton Black song) =

Single by Patti Drew

from the album Tell Him
- B-side: "Turn Away From Me"
- Released: 1963
- Genre: R&B
- Length: 2:25
- Label: Capitol
- Songwriter: Carlton Black

"Tell Him" is an R&B song written by Carlton Black in 1963, and was sung by R&B artist Patti Drew, both of whom were residents of Evanston, Illinois. Black sings on the recording; his bass is heard singing "Bom-Bom-Bom-Do" at the start of the song.

== Chart performance ==
"Tell Him" became a hit in Chicago and reached number 90 on both the Billboard and Cashbox pop charts. It entered the Billboard Hot 100 on February 8, 1964.

In 1967, after Patti Drew went solo, she recorded the song again and it reached number 22 on the Billboard R&B singles chart, as well as #85 on the Hot 100.
