= Deon Jackson (singer) =

American singer-songwriter (1946–2014)

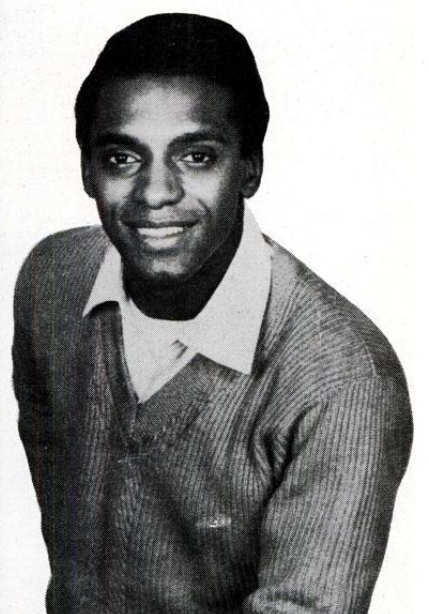
- Deon Jackson in 1967

Background information
- Born: January 26, 1946; Ann Arbor, Michigan, U.S.
- Origin: Ann Arbor, Michigan, U.S.
- Died: April 18, 2014 (aged 68) Arlington Heights, Illinois, U.S.
- Occupation: Singer-songwriter

Deon Jackson (January 26, 1946 – April 18, 2014) was an American soul singer and songwriter.

Jackson was born in Ann Arbor, Michigan, United States. He performed in vocal groups and as a soloist while he attended Ann Arbor High School, and was signed by producer Ollie McLaughlin while still in school. His first single was his own "You Said You Love Me", followed by "Come Back Home"; both were regional hits in his native Michigan.

Jackson toured heavily on the local club circuit before releasing his next record, 1965's "Love Makes the World Go 'Round" on Carla Records. The tune became a major pop hit, and an album was released subsequently on Atco Records. Jackson had two more successful singles and recorded until the end of the decade, but then faded from view, living and performing in the Chicago area. He is often referred to as a "one hit wonder". However, in the UK he is well known and respected on the Northern soul scene, where his records and unissued recordings are still played to this day. UK artist Kiki Dee had a minor US hit in 1971 with her cover of "Love Makes the World Go Round."

The American Singer Barbara Lewis 1967 cover version of "Love Makes the World Go Round." is part of the soundtrack album for the 2015 American crime comedy-drama film Focus starring Will Smith and Margot Robbie.

After having a brain hemorrhage at his home, Jackson died at the Northwest Community Hospital in Arlington Heights, Illinois, on April 18, 2014, at the age of 68.

== Singles ==
Year	Title	Chart Positions	
Year	Title	US Pop Singles	US Black Singles
1965	"Love Makes the World Go 'Round"	11	3
1966	"Love Takes a Long Time Growing"	77	-
1967	"I Can't Do Without You Baby"	111 (#11 on US Bub.)	-
1967	"Ooh Baby"	65	28
