= Algeria Shrine Temple =

- U.S. National Register of Historic Places
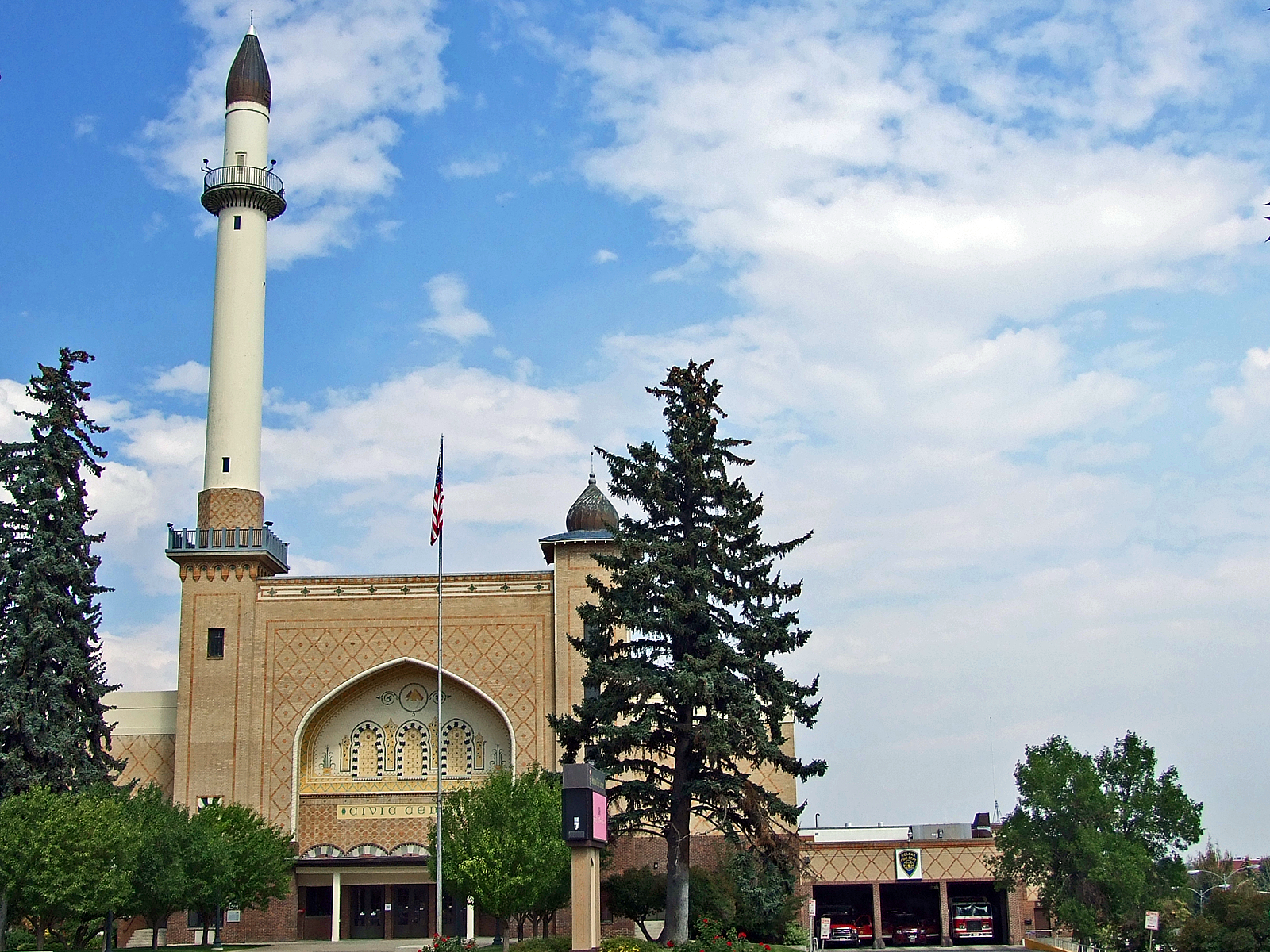

- Location within Montana Location within the United States
- Location: Neill and Park Aves., Helena, Montana
- Coordinates: 46°35′43″N 112°2′21″W
- Area: 0.9 acres (0.36 ha)
- Built: 1920
- Architect: Carsley, G.S.; Haire, C.S.
- Architectural style: Exotic Revival, Moorish Revival
- NRHP reference No.: 88000434
- Added to NRHP: April 14, 1988

The historic Algeria Shrine Temple, now also known as the Helena Civic Center, is a Moorish Revival building in Helena, Montana that was built in 1920. The building served as a meeting hall for the Algeria Shriners and had civic functions. It was listed on the National Register of Historic Places (under the shrine name) in 1988.

The National Register's database records "Historic subfunctions" that include "meeting hall" for the place. Today, the building has a 1925-seat auditorium and a 15,000 sq. ft. ballroom/exhibition hall. As of 2012, it is owned and operated by the City of Helena and available for banquets, craft shows, dances, weddings, trade shows and conferences.
