= Ev'ry Day of My Life =

"Every Day of My Life"

Single by Bobby Vinton

from the album Ev'ry Day of My Life
- B-side: "You Can Do It to Me Anytime"
- Released: January 1972
- Genre: Pop
- Length: 2:48
- Label: Epic Records
- Songwriters: Al Jacobs, Jimmie Crane

Bobby Vinton singles chronology
"I'll Make You My Baby" (1971)	"Every Day of My Life" (1972)	"Sealed with a Kiss" (1972)

"Ev'ry Day of My Life" is a popular song written in 1954 by Al Jacobs and Jimmie Crane.

== First recordings ==
Two of the most successful versions of this song were recorded by Malcolm Vaughan and The McGuire Sisters. Malcolm Vaughan's version reached No. 5 on the United Kingdom's New Musical Express chart in 1955, while The McGuire Sisters version reached No. 37 on the US Billboard Top 100 and No. 33 Cash Box in 1956.

== Bobby Vinton recording ==
The most widely successful version of the song was recorded in 1971 by Bobby Vinton and released on Epic Records. The cover premiered at that year's Macy's Thanksgiving Day Parade, and was released in January of 1972. Vinton's version spent 16 weeks on the Billboard Hot 100 chart, peaking at No. 24, while reaching No. 2 on Billboard's Easy Listening chart. It also reached No. 18 on Cash Box.

In Canada, the song reached No. 14 on the RPM 100, while reaching No. 32 on RPM Weekly's "The Programmers MOR Playlist". It was awarded "Most Played Award" for 1972 by the Juke Box Association of America as well.

The single release was Vinton's most successful single since the million-selling "I Love How You Love Me" in 1969, and spawned the album Ev'ry Day of My Life, which also charted on the Billboard Top LPs & Tape chart, peaking at #72. The LP Arranged and Produced by Jimmy "The Wiz" Wisner and Co-produced, recorded and mixed by Jim Reeves at Columbia Records, NYC in Studio B & C.

=== Charts ===
Chart (1972)	Peak position
U.S. Billboard Hot 100	24

== Other cover versions ==
- Another version recorded in 1972, was by Jerry Vale, on his "Alone Again (Naturally)" LP.
