= Ollie McLaughlin =

- Born: Ollie Anderson McLaughlin; March 24, 1925; Carthage, Mississippi, US
- Died: February 19, 1984 (aged 58) Detroit, Michigan, US
- Genres: Jazz, R&B, pop
- Occupations: Record producer, record label owner, DJ
- Years active: Late 1940s–1984

Ollie Anderson McLaughlin (March 24, 1925 – February 19, 1984) was an American record producer and record label owner. He discovered Del Shannon, and also organized or produced recordings by Dave Brubeck, Chet Baker, Dorothy Ashby, Barbara Lewis, and the Capitols, among many others.

== Biography ==
He was born in Carthage, Mississippi, United States, but moved to Ann Arbor, Michigan, as a child. After graduating and serving in the US Army during World War II, he studied at Columbia College in Chicago, before returning to Ann Arbor in the late 1940s to work as a DJ on radio station WHRV. He also promoted with his brother, jazz and R&B concerts. In March 1954, he promoted a concert by the Dave Brubeck Quartet in Ann Arbor, parts of which were released on the album Jazz Goes to College, and two months later he organized Chet Baker's concert, issued as the LP Jazz at Ann Arbor.

In 1960, he heard a country band led by Charles Westover, known at the time as Charlie Johnson, and recorded the band's demos, which he sent to Harry Balk and Irving Micahnik of Talent Artists in Detroit, Michigan. As a result, Westover was signed by Bigtop Records, and agreed to change his name to Del Shannon. McLaughlin had Shannon re-record one of his songs in New York City, using band member Max Crook's Musitron as lead instrument, and the resulting single, "Runaway", reached No. 1 in the Billboard chart in April 1961. McLaughlin also produced several of Shannon's later hits, including "Hats Off to Larry".

In the early 1960s, McLaughlin set up Karen Records, the first of three record labels named after his daughters, the others being Carla and Moira. Among the hit records he produced in the early and mid-1960s were "Hello Stranger", "Baby I'm Yours", and "Make Me Your Baby" by Barbara Lewis; "Love Makes The World Go Round" by Deon Jackson; and "Cool Jerk" by the Capitols. In some cases, it is believed that McLaughlin's production credit was an outcome of his management responsibilities for the artists concerned. Many of his recordings were made in Chicago and in Detroit, in some cases using musicians contracted to Motown, and several were leased to, and released by, the Atlantic and Atco labels. Among other musicians recorded by McLaughlin were Bettye LaVette, Richard "Popcorn" Wylie, Ruth Copeland, The Soul Twins, Johnnie Mae Matthews, and Matt Lucas. A number of McLaughlin's recordings from the 1960s have subsequently been reissued on Northern soul compilation records.

McLaughlin lived in Detroit from about 1970. He died at Sinai Hospital in 1984, aged 58. McLaughlin was inducted into the Michigan Rock and Roll Legends Hall of Fame in 2018.
