= The Crows =

American R&B vocal group

- The Crows, early 1950s

Background information
- Origin: Harlem, New York, United States
- Genres: R&B, doo wop
- Years active: 1951–1955
- Labels: Rama
- Past members: Daniel "Sonny" Norton; William "Bill" Davis; Harold Major; Jerry Wittick; Gerald Hamilton; Mark Jackson

The Crows were an American R&B vocal group formed in 1951. They achieved commercial success and popularity during the 1950s with their debut single and only hit, "Gee". The single, released in June 1953, has been credited with being the first rock and roll hit by a rock and roll group. It peaked at position number 14 and number 2, respectively, on the Billboard pop and R&B charts in 1954. Although Gee fell into the doo-wop genre, and "was the first 1950s doo-wop record to sell over one million records" in that genre, some (including Jay Warner) consider it as the first of the "rock and roll records".

== History ==
When The Crows started in 1951, practicing sidewalk harmonies, the original members were Daniel "Sonny" Norton (lead), William "Bill" Davis (baritone), Harold Major (tenor), Jerry Wittick (tenor) and Gerald Hamilton (bass). In 1952, Wittick left the group and was replaced by Mark Jackson (tenor and guitarist).

They were discovered at Apollo Theater's Wednesday night talent show by talent agent Cliff Martinez and brought to independent producer George Goldner, who had just started the Rama Records label. The Crows were the first group signed and the first to record. The first songs they recorded were as backup to singer Viola Watkins. The song "Gee" was the third song recorded during their first recording session, on February 10, 1953. It was put together in a few minutes by group member William Davis, with Watkins credited as co-writer.

The song was first released as the B-side of the ballad "I Love You So". However, radio stations began playing "Gee," first in Philadelphia and later in New York and Los Angeles. By January 1954, it had sold 100,000 copies, and by April it entered the national R&B and pop charts, rising to number 2 R&B and number 14 pop. The song was a hit a year after it was recorded.

The Crows were a one-hit wonder. While "Gee" was on the charts, the record company released a number of other singles by the group, including "Heartbreaker," "Baby," and "Miss You," but none were successful. Their failures and the inability to perform regularly to support their recordings, led to the breakup of the group a few months after "Gee" dropped off the charts. They maintained the original lineup for the entire career of the group, with no hope of a reunion following the deaths of Gerald Hamilton in the 1960s and Daniel Norton in 1972.
