= Barbara Lewis =

American singer and songwriter (born 1943)

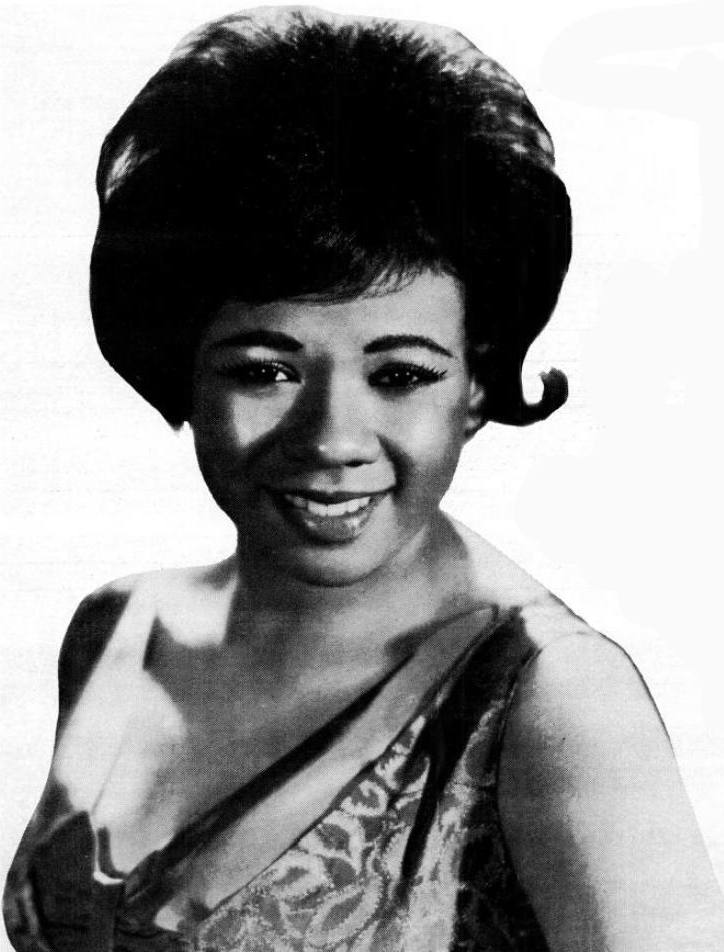
- Barbara Lewis in 1966

Background information
- Born: Barbara Ann Lewis; February 9, 1943 (age 83); Salem, Michigan, United States
- Genres: R&B/Soul
- Occupations: Singer, songwriter
- Years active: 1962–2017
- Label: Atlantic

Barbara Ann Lewis (born February 9, 1943) is an American singer and songwriter whose smooth style influenced rhythm and blues.

== Career ==
Lewis was born in Salem, Michigan, United States.

She was writing and recording by her teens with record producer Ollie McLaughlin, a black DJ at Ann Arbor radio station WHRV, now WAAM. Lewis's first single release, the uptempo "My Heart Went Do Dat Da" in 1962, did not chart nationally, but was a local hit in the Detroit, Michigan area. She wrote all of the songs on her debut LP, including the hit "Hello Stranger" which reached No. 3 on the US Billboard Hot 100 chart, and featured extensive use of the Hammond organ. Lewis had moderate follow-up hits with "Straighten Up Your Heart" (No. 43) and her original "Puppy Love" (No. 38) before Bert Berns produced her million-seller "Baby I'm Yours" (U.S. No. 11), written by Van McCoy. Berns also produced the followup "Make Me Your Baby" (U.S. No. 11) which had originally been recorded by the Pixies Three, and Lewis's final Top 40 hit "Make Me Belong to You" (No. 28 in 1966), written by Chip Taylor and Billy Vera.

At the end of the decade, she released a grittier-sounding album on Stax Records.

Over the next decade, a number of other artists had success with Lewis' songs. Her own composition "Hello Stranger"—which had been remade in 1966 by the Capitols—was a regional hit in 1973 as remade by Fire & Rain and in 1977 Yvonne Elliman's version reached the US Top 20 and the UK Singles Chart Top 30: Elliman's version also topped the US Easy Listening chart for four weeks. In 1985 Carrie Lucas's remake of "Hello Stranger" was a Top 20 R&B hit and in 2004 Queen Latifah remade "Hello Stranger" for her The Dana Owens Album.

Lewis had dropped out of public view for years after her career slowed in the 1960s. It was only after Elliman's hit in 1977 that she was tracked down by Casey Kasem for his AT40 show on June 4 of that year. According to Kasem, nobody knew where she had ended up, including her agent, who did not even know where to send her checks for the Elliman cover. According to Kasem, she was hoping to be rediscovered in Michigan when he found her.

Health issues forced Lewis to retire from singing in 2017.

"Baby I'm Yours" charted in versions by country singer Jody Miller and Debby Boone (the B-side of her single "God Knows"). In Canada, Suzanne Stevens had a hit in 1975 with a disco version of "Make Me Your Baby". Cover versions of her songs continue into the new millennium, with the Arctic Monkeys including a version of "Baby I'm Yours" as a B-side to their 2006 single "Leave Before the Lights Come On".

In 1995, Lewis's "Baby I'm Yours" was featured on the soundtrack for the film The Bridges of Madison County, and in 2016 "Hello Stranger" was featured on the soundtrack for the film Moonlight. In 2019, "Hello Stranger" was featured towards the end of the final episode of the British TV series Giri/Haji.

She received the Pioneer Award from the Rhythm and Blues Foundation in 1999. In 2016, Barbara Lewis was inducted into the Michigan Rock and Roll Legends Hall of Fame.

== Discography ==
=== Studio albums ===
- Hello Stranger (1963)
- Snap Your Fingers (1964)
- Baby, I'm Yours (1965)
- It's Magic (1966)
- Workin' on a Groovy Thing (1968)
- The Many Grooves of Barbara Lewis (1970)

=== Chart singles ===
- "Hello Stranger" – May 1963 – US No. 3, U.S. R&B No. 1 (2 weeks)
- "Straighten Up Your Heart" – August 1963 – U.S. No. 43; b/w "If You Love Her" – U.S. No. 131
- "Puppy Love" – January 1964 – U.S. No. 38, No. 14 R&B; b/w "Snap Your Fingers" December 1963 – U.S. No. 71, No. 21 R&B
- "Baby I'm Yours" – June 1965 – U.S. No. 11, No. 5 R&B
- "Make Me Your Baby" – September 1965 – U.S. No. 11, No. 9 R&B
- "Don't Forget About Me" – January 1966 – U.S. No. 91
- "Make Me Belong to You" – July 1966 – U.S. No. 28, No. 36 R&B
- "Baby What Do You Want Me to Do" – October 1966 – U.S. No. 74
- "I'll Make Him Love Me" – April 1967 – U.S. No. 72

=== Other noteworthy songs ===
- "My Heart Went Do Dat Da"
- "My Mama Told Me"
- "Think a Little Sugar" (flip side of "Hello Stranger")
- "How Can I Say Goodbye"
- "Spend a Little Time"
- "Someday We're Gonna Love Again"
- "Pushin' a Good Thing Too Far"
- "I Remember the Feeling (flip side of "Baby What Do You Want Me to Do")
- "Thankful for What I Got"
- "Sho' Nuff (It's Got to Be Your Love)"
- "Love Makes the World Go Round" – a cover of a hit by Deon Jackson
- "On Bended Knee"
