= Jody Miller discography =

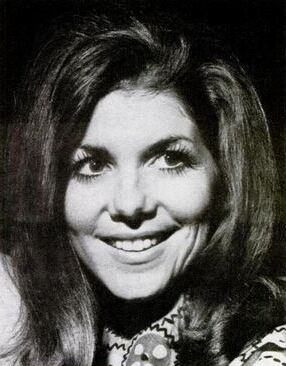
- Jody Miller, 1974.
- Studio albums: 21
- EPs: 1
- Compilation albums: 5
- Singles: 57
- Video albums: 1
- Lead singles: 47
- Collaborative singles: 2
- Promotional singles: 2
- International singles: 5
- Other album appearances: 1

The discography of American singer Jody Miller contains 21 studio albums, five compilation albums, one video album, one album appearance, one extended play (EP) and 57 singles. Of her 57 singles, 47 were issued with Miller as the lead artist, two were released as a collaboration, two were promotional singles and five were internationally-released singles.

At Capitol Records, Miller recorded several albums beginning with Wednesday's Child Is Full of Woe (1963). In 1963, her debut single "He Walks Like a Man" reached the American Billboard Hot 100. In 1965, the single "Queen of the House" reached number 12 on the Hot 100 and the top five of Billboard Hot Country Songs chart. A corresponding album of the same name reached number 12 on the Billboard Top Country Albums survey and number 124 on the Billboard 200. It was followed by the charting single "Silver Threads and Golden Needles" and the top 30 song "Home of the Brave". The Capitol label issued three more studio albums of Miller's recordings, including The Nashville Sound of Jody Miller (1968), which reached the country albums top 50.

At Epic Records, Miller's singles and albums made the North American country charts. Her first Epic album was 1970's Look at Mine. It was followed by 1971's He's So Fine, which featured the top five Billboard country songs "He's So Fine" and "Baby I'm Yours". Both singles also reached the Hot 100 and the Billboard adult contemporary chart. These songs also made the top ten of the Canadian RPM Country Tracks survey.

Three more singles reached the country top ten through 1973: "There's a Party Goin' On", "Good News" and "Darling You Can Always Come Back Home". Three additional singles made the North American country top 20: "Be My Baby", "To Know Him Is to Love Him" and "Let's All Go Down to the River". Her top ten singles were featured on the studio albums There's a Party Goin' On (1972) and Good News! (1973). Both albums made the American country chart.

Miller remained at the Epic label through 1979, releasing four more studio albums such as House of the Rising Sun (1974) and Country Girl (1975). Her final studio album was 1977's Here's Jody Miller. Following a single also titled "House of the Rising Sun", her recordings reached progressively lower chart positions on the country charts. She reached the Billboard country top 40 one more time with 1976's "When the New Wears Off Our Love". Her singles charted through the close of the decade. Miller's final charting single was "Lay a Little Lovin' on Me" (1979). Miller sporadically recorded for different labels over the next several decades. This included My Country, Higher, Real Good Feelin and Bye Bye Blues.

== Albums ==
=== Studio albums ===
List of studio albums, with selected chart positions and other relevant details
Title	Album details	Peak chart positions	
Title	Album details	US	US Cou.
Wednesday's Child Is Full of Woe	Released: 1963; Label: Capitol; Formats: LP	—	—
Queen of the House	Released: April 1965; Label: Capitol; Formats: LP	124	17
Home of the Brave	Released: October 1965; Label: Capitol; Formats: LP	—	—
Jody Miller Sings the Great Hits of Buck Owens	Released: March 1966; Label: Capitol; Formats: LP	—	—
The Nashville Sound of Jody Miller	Released: November 1968; Label: Capitol; Formats: LP	—	42
Look at Mine	Released: December 1970; Label: Epic; Formats: LP	—	20
He's So Fine	Released: August 1971; Label: Epic; Formats: LP	117	12
There's a Party Goin' On	Released: September 1972; Label: Epic; Formats: LP	—	29
Good News!	Released: July 1973; Label: Epic; Formats: LP	—	18
House of the Rising Sun	Released: January 1974; Label: Epic; Formats: LP	—	30
Country Girl	Released: February 1975; Label: Epic; Formats: LP	—	49
Will You Love Me Tomorrow?	Released: March 1976; Label: Epic; Formats: LP	—	—
Here's Jody Miller	Released: March 1977; Label: Epic; Formats: LP	—	—
My Country	Released: 1988; Label: Amethyst; Formats: Cassette	—	—
A Home for My Heart	Released: 1988; Label: Amethyst; Formats: Cassette	—	—
Real Good Feelin' (as Jody & Robin)	Released: 1991; Label: Zero; Formats: CD	—	—
Greatest Hits (re-recordings)	Released: 1992; Label: C.E.O. Nashville; Formats: CD	—	—
The Baby from Bethlehem	Released: 1996; Label: Jody Miller; Formats: CD	—	—
I'll Praise the Lamb	Released: 1996; Label: White Dove; Formats: CD	—	—
Higher	Released: 1999; Label: Compendia/Jody Miller; Formats: CD	—	—
Bye Bye Blues	Released: 2002; Label: Jody Miller; Formats: CD	—	—
"—" denotes a recording that did not chart or was not released in that territory.

=== Compilation albums ===
List of compilation albums, with selected chart positions and other relevant details
Title	Album details	Peak chart positions
Title	Album details	US Country
Queen of Country	Released: 1966; Label: Hilltop; Formats: LP	—
The Best of Jody Miller	Released: April 1973; Label: Capitol; Formats: LP	41
Anthology	Released: March 14, 2000; Label: Renaissance; Formats: CD	—
Complete Epic Hits	Released: 2012; Label: Epic/Real Gone; Formats: CD, digital	—
The Best of Jody Miller	Released: 2016; Label: Capitol Nashville; Formats: Digital	—
"—" denotes a recording that did not chart or was not released in that territory.

== Extended plays ==
List of extended plays, showing all relevant details
Title	EP details
Wayfaring Stranger – The Final Recordings	Released: January 5, 2023; Label: Heart of Texas; Formats: Digital

== Singles ==
=== As lead artist ===
List of lead artist singles, with selected chart positions, showing other relevant details
Title	Year	Peak chart positions								Album
Title	Year	US	US AC	US Cou.	AUS	CAN	CAN AC	CAN Cou.	UK	Album
"He Walks Like a Man"	1963	66	—	—	8	—	—	—	—	Queen of the House
"They Call My Guy a Tiger"	1964	—	—	—	53	—	—	—	—	—N/a
"The Fever"	1964	—	—	—	—	—	—	—	—	—N/a
"Warm Is the Love"	1964	—	—	—	—	—	—	—	—	—N/a
"Look for Small Pleasures"	1964	—	—	—	—	—	—	—	—	—N/a
"Never Let Him Go"	1965	—	—	—	—	—	—	—	—	—N/a
"Queen of the House"	1965	12	4	5	68	—	—	—	—	Queen of the House
"Silver Threads and Golden Needles"	1965	54	—	—	—	—	—	—	—	Queen of the House
"Home of the Brave"	1965	25	—	—	29	5	—	—	49	Home of the Brave
"Magic Town"	1965	— (Note: "Magic Town" did not enter the Hot 100, but peaked at number 25 on Bubbling Under Hot 100 Singles, which acts as a 25-song extension of the Hot 100)	—	—	—	—	—	—	—	—N/a
"We're Gonna Let the Good Times Roll"	1966	—	—	—	—	—	—	—	—	Jody Miller Sings the Great Hits of Buck Owens
"I Remember Mama"	1966	—	—	—	—	—	—	—	—	—N/a
"Things"	1966	—	—	—	—	—	—	—	—	—N/a
"If You Were a Carpenter"	1966	—	—	—	—	—	—	—	—	—N/a
"How Do You Say Goodbye"	1967	—	—	—	—	—	—	—	—	—N/a
"Kiss Me"	1967	—	—	—	—	—	—	—	—	—N/a
"To Sir with Love"	1967	—	—	—	—	—	—	—	—	—N/a
"I Knew You Well"	1967	—	—	—	—	—	—	—	—	—N/a
"It's My Time"	1968	—	—	—	—	—	—	—	—	The Nashville Sound of Jody Miller
"Long Black Limousine"	1968	—	—	73	—	—	—	—	—	The Nashville Sound of Jody Miller
"Bon Soir Cher"	1969	—	—	—	—	—	—	—	—	—N/a
"My Daddy's Thousand Dollars"	1969	—	—	—	—	—	—	—	—	—N/a
"Look at Mine"	1970	—	—	21	—	—	—	26	—	Look at Mine
"If You Think I Love You Now (I've Just Started)"	1970	—	—	19	—	—	—	29	—	Look at Mine
"He's So Fine"	1971	53	2	5	28	46	1	3	—	He's So Fine
"Baby, I'm Yours"	1971	91	21	5	—	—	25	8	—	He's So Fine
"Be My Baby"	1972	—	35	15	—	—	—	11	—	There's a Party Goin' On
"Let's All Go Down to the River" (with Johnny Paycheck)	1972	—	—	13	—	—	—	18	—	There's a Party Goin' On
"There's a Party Goin' On"	1972	— (Note: "There's a Party Goin' On" did not enter the Hot 100, but peaked at number 15 on Bubbling Under Hot 100 Singles, which acts as a 25-song extension of the Hot 100.)	23	4	—	—	20	1	—	There's a Party Goin' On
"To Know Him Is to Love Him"	1972	—	—	18	—	—	—	12	—	There's a Party Goin' On
"Good News"	1973	—	—	9	—	—	—	9	—	Good News
"Darling, You Can Always Come Back Home"	1973	—	—	5	—	—	—	3	—	Good News
"The House of the Rising Sun"	1973	—	41	29	—	—	81	23	—	House of the Rising Sun
"Reflections"	1974	—	—	55	—	—	—	—	—	House of the Rising Sun
"Natural Woman"	1974	—	—	46	—	—	—	—	—	House of the Rising Sun
"Country Girl"	1974	—	—	41	—	—	—	—	—	Country Girl
"The Best in Me"	1975	—	—	78	—	—	—	—	—	Country Girl
"Don't Take It Away"	1975	—	—	67	—	—	—	—	—	Will You Love Me Tomorrow
"Will You Love Me Tomorrow"	1975	—	—	69	—	—	—	—	—	Will You Love Me Tomorrow
"Ashes of Love"	1976	—	—	48	—	—	—	—	—	Will You Love Me Tomorrow
"When the New Wears Off Our Love"	1976	—	—	25	—	—	—	—	—	Here's Jody Miller
"Spread a Little Love Around"	1977	—	—	71	—	—	—	—	—	Here's Jody Miller
"Another Lonely Night"	1977	—	—	76	—	—	—	—	—	—N/a
"Soft Lights and Slow Sexy Music"	1978	—	—	97	—	—	—	—	—	—N/a
"(I Wanna) Love My Life Away"	1978	—	—	67	—	—	—	—	—	—N/a
"Kiss Away"	1978	—	—	65	—	—	—	—	—	—N/a
"I Don't Want Nobody (To Lead Me On)"	1979	—	—	—	—	—	—	—	—	—N/a
"Lay a Little Lovin' on Me"	1979	—	—	97	—	—	—	—	—	—N/a
"—" denotes a recording that did not chart or was not released in that territory.

=== As a collaborative artist ===
List of collaborative singles, showing all relevant details
Title	Year	Album	Ref.
"Run for the Roses" (with Western Union)	1982	—N/a	
"Where My Picture Hangs on the Wall" (credited as Jody Miller and Three Generations)	2018	—N/a	

=== Promotional singles ===
List of promotional singles, showing all relevant details
Title	Year	Album	Ref.
"He's So Fine" (Memory Lane series)	1973	—N/a	
"Silent Night, Lonely Night"	1973	—N/a	

=== Foreign language singles ===
List of foreign language singles, with selected chart positions, showing other relevant details
Title	Year	Peak chart positions	Album
Title	Year	GER	Album
"Jetzt Geh'n Uns're Sterne Auf"	1965	33	—N/a
"Non Dirai Di No"	1965	—	—N/a
"Devi Essere Tu"	1965	—	—N/a
"Io Che Non Vivo (Senza Te)"	1965	—	—N/a
"Was Für Ein Tag"	1966	—	—N/a
"—" denotes a recording that did not chart or was not released in that territory.

== Video albums ==
List of video albums, showing all relevant details
Title	EP details
The Jody Miller Day Show	Released: 2016; Label: Heart of Texas; Formats: DVD

== Other album appearances ==
List of non-single guest appearances, showing year released and album name
Title	Year	Album	Ref.
"What Child Is This?"	1981	Country Christmas: We Wish You a Country Christmas	
