= Let's All Go Down to the River =

Single by Jody Miller and Johnny Paycheck

from the album There's a Party Goin' On
- B-side: "In the Garden"
- Released: April 1972
- Recorded: March 1972
- Studio: Columbia (Nashville, Tennessee)
- Genre: Nashville Sound; gospel
- Length: 2:30
- Label: Epic
- Songwriters: Earl Montgomery; Sue Richards
- Producer: Billy Sherrill

Jody Miller singles chronology
"Be My Baby" (1972)	"Let's All Go Down to the River" (1972)	"There's a Party Goin' On" (1972)

Johnny Paycheck singles chronology
"Someone to Give My Love To" (1972)	"Let's All Go Down to the River" (1972)	"Love Is a Good Thing" (1972)

"Let's All Go Down to the River" is a song originally recorded as a duet by American singers Jody Miller and Johnny Paycheck. The Miller-Paycheck rendition reached the top 20 of the American and Canadian country charts after being released as a single in 1972.

== Background and recording ==
Jody Miller first found success with 1965's "Queen of the House"; however, after a series of pop releases, she found country success at Epic Records. In 1971, she reached the country top five with "He's So Fine" and "Baby I'm Yours". Meanwhile, Johnny Paycheck had first reached the country top ten with 1966's "The Lovin' Machine". After some personal challenges, he also signed to Epic and reached the top ten again with songs like "Someone to Give My Love To". Together, they recorded as a duet pairing with the song "Let's All Go Down to the River". It was composed by Earl Montgomery and Sue Richards. The duet was produced by Billy Sherrill at the Columbia Studios in Nashville, Tennessee in March 1972. The song was described as an inspirational.

== Release, reception and chart performance ==
"Let's All Go to the River" was released as a single by Epic Records in April 1972. On the B-side was a second duet: "In the Garden". The single was distributed as a seven-inch vinyl disc. The duet was given a positive response from Cashbox magazine, finding that the pair "form a bright new country couple". In 1972, the duet reached the number 13 position on the American Billboard Hot Country Songs chart. It also reached the number 18 position on the Canadian RPM Country Tracks chart the same year. It was later featured on Jody Miller's 1972 studio album There's a Party Goin' On. It was the duo's only duet single together and Miller's only duet to make any music chart.

== Track listing ==
7" vinyl single

- "Let's All Go Down to the River" – 2:30
- "In the Garden" – 2:30

== Charts ==
=== Weekly charts ===
Weekly chart performance for "Let's All Go Down to the River"
Chart (1972)	Peak position
Canada Country Tracks (RPM)	18
US Hot Country Songs (Billboard)	13
