= Home of the Brave =

"Home of the Brave" is the ending phrase from the United States national anthem "The Star-Spangled Banner". It may refer to:

== Film ==
- Home of the Brave (1949 film), a film directed by Mark Robson
- Home of the Brave (1985 film), a documentary directed by Helena Solberg
- Home of the Brave (1986 film), a concert film featuring and directed by Laurie Anderson
- "Home of the Brave", a season eight episode of TV series Walker, Texas Ranger
- Home of the Brave (2004 film), a documentary directed by Paola di Florio
- Home of the Brave (2006 film), a film starring Samuel L. Jackson, 50 Cent, and Billy Michael

== Music ==
- "Home of the Brave" (song), a 1965 song by Jody Miller
  - Home of the Brave (Jody Miller album), a corresponding 1965 album of the same name
- Home of the Brave (Black 47 album), a 1994 album by American band Black 47
- Home of the Brave (soundtrack), a soundtrack album for the 1986 film of same name
- "Home of the Brave", a song by Lou Reed from the album Legendary Hearts
- "Home of the Brave", a song by The Nails from the 1984 album Mood Swing
- "Home of the Brave", a song by Spiritualized from the album Ladies and Gentlemen We Are Floating in Space
- "Home of the Brave", a song by Gigolo Aunts from the album Tales from the Vinegar Side
- "Home of the Brave", a song by Toto from the album The Seventh One
- "Home of the Brave", a song by White Ring from the 2018 album Gate of Grief
- "This Is the Home of the Brave", the national anthem of the Islamic Emirate of Afghanistan

== Other uses ==
- Home of the Brave (play), a play by Arthur Laurents
- Home of the Brave (radio program), an American radio program broadcast on CBS
- Home of the Brave (Cyberpunk), a 1992 supplement for the role-playing game Cyberpunk
