= Land of the Free =

Land of the Free may refer to:

== Music ==
=== Anthems ===
- "Land of the Free" (anthem), the national anthem of Belize by Selwyn Walford Young
- A phrase in "The Star-Spangled Banner", national anthem of the United States
  - A nickname for the United States in general

=== Other music ===
- Land of the Free (Gamma Ray album), 1995
- Land of the Free II, by Gamma Ray
- Land of the Free (Martin Zobel album), 2012
- Land of the Free?, a 2001 album by Pennywise, a California punk rock band
- "Land of the Free" (song), a 2017 song from the album All-Amerikkkan Badass
- "Land of the Free", a 2019 song by The Killers

== Film and TV ==
- Land of the Free (film), a 1998 film featuring William Shatner
- "Land of the Free" (Cagney & Lacey), a 1988 television episode
- "Land of the Free" (Knots Landing), a 1980 television episode

== Books ==
- A line in "Defence of Fort M'Henry", 1814 poem by Francis Scott Key
- "Land of the Free", a 1938 poem by Archibald MacLeish
- Land of the Free, a 2014 novel by American author Woodrow Landfair

== Other ==
- Land of the Free (Cyberpunk), a 1994 campaign of five adventures for the role-playing game Cyberpunk 2020
