= House of the Rising Sun (Jody Miller album) =

Studio album by Jody Miller
- Released: February 1974
- Recorded: April–October 1973
- Studios: Columbia (Nashville, Tennessee)
- Genres: Country; pop; R&B
- Label: Epic
- Producer: Billy Sherrill

Jody Miller chronology
Good News! (1973)	House of the Rising Sun (1974)	Country Girl (1975)

Singles from House of the Rising Sun
- 1. "The House of the Rising Sun" Released: October 1973; 2. "Reflections" Released: February 1974; 3. "Natural Woman" Released: June 1974

House of the Rising Sun is a studio album by American singer Jody Miller. It was released in January 1974 via Epic Records and contained 11 tracks. Marketed as a country album, its 11 songs mixed covers with original material. Among its covers was the title track, which was among the album's three charting singles. The album itself reached the American country chart in 1974. It received positive reviews from Billboard and Cashbox following its release.

== Background, recording and content ==
First achieving commercial success with 1965's "Queen of the House", Jody Miller had her most commercially successful period during the 1970s when she focused her career towards country music. Among her top ten country singles were covers of "He's So Fine" and "Baby I'm Yours". By the middle seventies, Miller's chart success declined but she continued recording for her label, Epic Records. Among her Epic studio albums of the middle seventies was House of the Rising Sun. It was recorded at the Columbia Studios in sessions between April and October 1973. It was produced by Billy Sherrill.

The album was named for its title track, which was a traditional folk tune covered by various artists. Among them was a popular version by The Animals. Miller's cover first appeared on her 1973 studio album Good News!. House of the Rising Sun consisted of 11 tracks. Along with the title track, Miller covered other songs that had been commercially successful singles on the Billboard Hot 100. This included Olivia Newton-John's "Let Me Be There", Kris Kristofferson's "Lovin' Arms", Aretha Franklin's "Natural Woman", Linda Ronstadt's "Long, Long Time" and another Olivia Newton-John single called "Let It Shine".

== Release and critical reception ==
House of the Rising Sun was released by Epic Records in January 1974. It was distributed as a vinyl LP. Five singles were featured on "side A" while six songs were featured on "side B". It was the tenth studio album of her career. It was met with mostly favorable reviews. Billboard magazine commented that album "shows what she can really do". They also noted that it is a "really outstanding album and not a weak cut in it." Cashbox also gave the album a positive response. "The polish and vocal beauty that Jody is able to give to her vocal masterpieces makes anything the pretty young lady touches an instant success," they commented. Meanwhile, AllMusic only gave the album two out of five stars.

== Chart performance and singles ==
House of the Rising Sun reached the number 30 position on the American Billboard Top Country Albums chart in 1974. It was Miller's seventh album to reach the country albums survey and among her final to do so. A total of three singles were spawned from the album. Its lead single was the title track, which was first issued in October 1974. The single reached number 29 on the Billboard Hot Country Songs chart and number 23 on the Canadian RPM Country Tracks chart. A new song titled "Reflections" was released as the album's second single in February 1974. It reached number 55 on the Hot Country Songs chart. The third and final single was released in June 1974, "Natural Woman". It reached number 46 on the Country Songs chart in the United States.

== Track listing ==
Side one
No.	Title	Writer(s)	Length
1.	"The House of the Rising Sun"	A. Price	3:16
2.	"Lovin' Arms"	T. Jans	2:26
3.	"Natural Woman"	G. Goffin; C. King	3:22
4.	"Let Me Be There"	J. Rostill	2:51
5.	"Reflections"	N.B. Johnston; R. Lane; R. Porter	3:00

Side two
No.	Title	Writer(s)	Length
1.	"Long, Long Time"	G. White	3:06
2.	"Let It Shine"	L. Hargrove	2:22
3.	"All I Want Is You"	L. Butler	2:20
4.	"Lucky Chicago"	L. Keith; M.A. Leikin	2:40
5.	"Another Night of Love"	S. Oldham; F. Weller	2:25
6.	"Smile, Somebody Loves You"	T. Austin	2:28

== Technical personnel ==
All credits are adapted from the liner notes of Good News!

- Bill Barnes – Cover art
- Lou Bradley – Engineer
- Al Clayton – Photography
- The Jordanaires – Background vocals
- Slick Lawson – Back cover photo
- Bill McElhiney – String arrangements
- Cam Mullins – String arrangements
- The Nashville Edition – Background vocals
- Peggy Owens – Cover art
- Ron Reynolds – Engineer
- Billy Sherrill – Producer

== Charts ==
Chart (1974)	Peak position
US Top Country Albums (Billboard)	30

== Release history ==
Region	Date	Format	Label	Ref.
North America	January 1974	Vinyl LP	Epic Records	
