= There's a Party Goin' On (Jody Miller album) =

Studio album by Jody Miller
- Released: September 1972
- Recorded: December 1971–April 1972
- Studios: Columbia (Nashville, Tennessee)
- Genres: Country; pop
- Label: Epic
- Producer: Billy Sherrill

Jody Miller chronology
He's So Fine (1971)	There's a Party Goin' On (1972)	Good News! (1973)

Singles from There's a Party Goin' On
- 1. "Be My Baby" Released: February 1972; 2. "Let's All Go Down to the River" Released: April 1972; 3. "There's a Party Goin' On" Released: May 1972; 4. "To Know Him Is to Love Him" Released: October 1972

There's a Party Goin' On is a studio album by American singer Jody Miller. It was released in September 1972 via Epic Records and contained 11 tracks. The album blended country and pop songs. A series of popular country and pop cover recordings were included, along with some new material. There's a Party Goin' On reached the top 30 of the American country albums chart. A total of four singles were included on the album: "Be My Baby", "Let's All Go Down to the River", "There's a Party Goin' On" and "To Know Him is to Love Him". The title track was the most successful single from the album. The disc received positive reviews from publications following its release.

== Background ==
After her country–pop success with "Queen of the House" in 1965, Jody Miller made a conscious effort to focus her career towards the country market in the 1970s. She signed with Billy Sherrill and started recording in Nashville, Tennessee. She had a series of top ten and top 20 country songs during the early seventies such as "He's So Fine" and "Baby I'm Yours". In 1972, Miller had two top 20 country singles in North America with "Be My Baby" and "Let's All Go Down to the River". Another single, "There's a Party Goin' On", reached the top ten in 1972. Miller's next studio album would be titled after her top ten single.

== Recording and content ==
There's a Party Goin' On was recorded in sessions held between December 1971 and April 1972 at the Columbia Studios in Nashville. The sessions were produced solely by Billy Sherrill. The album consisted of 11 tracks. Only two of the songs were new material: the title track (written by Sherrill and Glenn Sutton) and "Let's All Go Down to the River" (written by Earl Montgomery and Sue Richards). The latter was a duet with fellow Epic recording artist Johnny Paycheck.

Remaining tracks were cover recordings. Among them was Paycheck's "Someone to Give My Love To", which had originally been a top ten country single for Paycheck. Other country covers included Donna Fargo's chart-topping "The Happiest Girl in the Whole U.S.A.", two top ten Tanya Tucker singles ("Delta Dawn" and "Love's the Answer") and Glen Campbell's top ten song "Manhattan, Kansas". Miller also recorded "Your Love's Been a Long Time Coming", which had originally appeared on Tammy Wynette's album Bedtime Story. Miller also covered pop songs such as The Ronettes's "Be My Baby", The Teddy Bears's "To Know Him Is to Love Him" and Bread's "Everything I Own". Miller recalled that "Someone to Give My Love To", "Let's All Go Down to the River" and the title track were her "favorites" on the disc.

== Release, critical reception and chart performance ==
There's a Party Goin' On was first released by Epic Records in September 1972. It was distributed as a vinyl LP, with five songs on "Side A" and six songs on "Side B". It was the eighth studio album of Miller's career and her third with Epic. The album received positive reviews from music publications following its original release. Billboard called it a "strong package" that would help Miller "garner even more fans" because she covered various popular hits. Cashbox magazine further praised the album: "There's a party goin' on on Jody Miller's new album! The girl with the happy voice has furthered her campaign to merge pop and country music with an eleven song set immaculately produced by Billy Sherrill." It was Miller's fifth album to make the American Billboard Top Country Albums chart, reaching the number 29 position in 1972.

== Singles ==
A total of four singles were included on There's a Party Goin' On. The first single released from the intended album was Miller's cover of "Be My Baby". Epic issued the single in February 1972. It reached number 15 on the American Billboard Hot Country Songs chart and number 11 on the Canadian RPM Country Tracks chart. It also reached the number 35 position on the Billboard adult contemporary chart. The Miller/Paycheck duet of "Let's All Go Down to the River" was released in April 1972 as the next single. It peaked at number 13 on the Billboard country chart and number 18 on the RPM country chart.

The title track was issued as the third single in May 1972. It was the most successful single from the album, peaking at number four on the Billboard country survey, number one on the RPM country survey, number 23 on the Billboard adult contemporary list and number 20 on the RPM adult contemporary list. Miller's cover of "To Know Him Is to Love Him" was the final single spawned and was first issued by Epic in October 1972. It peaked at number 18 on the Billboard country survey and number 12 on the RPM country survey.

== Track listing ==
Side one
No.	Title	Writer(s)	Length
1.	"There's a Party Goin' On"	B. Sherrill; G. Sutton	2:36
2.	"Everything I Own"	D. Gates	2:59
3.	"Be My Baby"	J. Barry; E. Greenwich; P. Spector	2:36
4.	"Manhattan, Kansas"	J. Allen	2:47
5.	"Delta Dawn"	L. Collins; A. Harvey	2:52

Side two
No.	Title	Writer(s)	Length
1.	"The Happiest Girl in the Whole U.S.A."	D. Fargo	2:28
2.	"Someone to Give My Love To"	J. Foster; B. Rice	2:58
3.	"To Know Him Is to Love Him"	P. Spector	2:41
4.	"Your Love's Been a Long Time Coming"	C. Taylor; N. Wilson	2:19
5.	"Love's the Answer"	E. Mitchell; N. Wilson	2:36
6.	"Let's All Go Down to the River" (with Johnny Paycheck)	E. Montgomery; S. Richards	2:30

== Technical personnel ==
All credits are adapted from the liner notes of There's a Party Goin' On.

- Bill Barnes – Cover design
- Charlie Bragg – Engineer
- Lou Bradley – Engineer
- Al Clayton – Back cover photography
- Slick Lawson – Front cover photography
- The Jordanaires – Background vocals
- The Nashville Edition – Background vocals
- Billy Sherrill – Producer

== Charts ==
Chart (1972)	Peak position
US Top Country Albums (Billboard)	29

== Release history ==
Region	Date	Format	Label	Ref.
North America	September 1972	Vinyl LP	Epic Records	
United Kingdom	September 1972	Vinyl LP	Epic Records	
North America	circa 2020	Digital download; streaming	Sony Music Entertainment	
