= HOTB =

HOTB can stand for:

- Hang on the Box, an all-female punk band from Beijing, China.
- In the Heart of the Beast Puppet and Mask Theatre, a puppet theater company from Minneapolis, Minnesota
- Home of the Brave, a phrase from The Star-Spangled Banner and the name of several films
- Hooked on the Brothers, a phrase from the introduction of the 1989 television show The Super Mario Bros. Super Show!.
- The Hound of the Baskervilles, a 1902 mystery novel by Arthur Conan Doyle featuring Sherlock Holmes.
- Houses of the Blooded, a roleplaying game designed by John Wick.
