= Wednesday's Child Is Full of Woe (disambiguation) =

Wednesday's Child Is Full of Woe is a line from the traditional rhyme "Monday's Child".

Wednesday's Child Is Full of Woe may also refer to:

- Wednesday's Child Is Full of Woe, a 1963 studio album by American singer Jody Miller
- "Wednesday's Child Is Full of Woe" (Wednesday), a 2022 episode of the television series Wednesday
