= The Nashville Sound of Jody Miller =

Studio album by Jody Miller
- Released: November 1968
- Recorded: March–October 1968
- Studio: Columbia (Nashville, Tennessee)
- Genre: Country
- Label: Capitol
- Producer: Joe Allison

Jody Miller chronology
| Jody Miller Sings the Great Hits of Buck Owens (1966) | The Nashville Sound of Jody Miller (1968) | Look at Mine (1970) |

Singles from The Nashville Sound of Jody Miller
- 1. "It's My Time" Released: May 1968; 2. "Long Black Limousine" Released: October 1968

The Nashville Sound of Jody Miller is a studio album by American singer Jody Miller. It was released in November 1968 via Capitol Records and contained 12 tracks. The album was Miller's second to completely feature country material and her first to be recorded in Nashville, Tennessee. Of its two singles, Miller's interpretation of "Long Black Limousine" made the American country chart. The album itself also charted on the American country LP's chart in 1968. It was met with a favorable review from Billboard magazine in 1968.

== Background, recording and content ==
Although signed to Capitol Records as a folk singer in 1963, Jody Miller first achieved commercial success with the country pop song "Queen of the House". Miller would cut further pop material in the 1960s. She also recorded country material including The Nashville Sound of Jody Miller. The album was Miller's first to be recorded in Nashville, Tennessee and her first to be produced by Joe Allison. Sessions were held at the Columbia Studios between March and October 1968. According to Miller herself, the album's sessions were her first experiences working alongside Nashville session musicians including Hargus "Pig" Robbins.

The Nashville Sound of Jody Miller consisted of 12 tracks. Included on the album were covers of Joni Mitchell's "Urge for Going" and the Hank Cochran-penned "Don't You Ever Get Tired (Of Hurting Me)". Other tracks included "Back in the Race", which was co-written by Glen Campbell and "Over the Edge", which was also written by Hank Cochran. Miller also recorded a cover of the song "Long Black Limousine". The latter has since been recorded handful of times, most notably by Elvis Presley.

== Release, reception, chart performance and singles ==
The Nashville Sound of Jody Miller was originally released on Capitol Records in November 1968. It was Miller's fifth studio album in her career. It was first distributed as a vinyl LP. Six songs were featured on side A and side B respectively. Billboard magazine named it among its "Special Merit Picks" in November 1968, stating that it "should please her many fans and win her many more." It Miller's first album in three years to make any Billboard chart, reaching the number 42 position on their Top Country Albums survey.

Two singles were included on the album. The first was the song "It's My Time", which was first released in March 1968. It was followed by "Long Black Limousine", which was issued as a single in October 1968. It was Miller's first charting single in four years, reaching number 73 on the Billboard Hot Country Songs chart. The album was later released to digital markets in November 2021, when Capitol chose to re-release all of Miller's albums from the label.

== Track listing ==
Side one
| No. | Title | Writer(s) | Length |
|---|---|---|---|
| 1. | "It's My Time" | John D. Loudermilk | 2:39 |
| 2. | "Over the Edge" | Hank Cochran | 2:30 |
| 3. | "Urge for Going" | Joni Mitchell | 3:08 |
| 4. | "Back in the Race" | Glen Campbell; Vic Dana | 2:03 |
| 5. | "The Wishing Tree" | Leona Butrum; Nellie Smith | 2:43 |
| 6. | "Long Black Limousine" | Bobby George; Vern Stovall | 3:13 |

Side two
| No. | Title | Writer(s) | Length |
|---|---|---|---|
| 1. | "I Remember Loving Someone" | Diane Hildebrand | 2:50 |
| 2. | "Odds and Ends" | Harlan Howard | 2:39 |
| 3. | "Don't You Ever Get Tired (Of Hurting Me)" | Cochran | 3:07 |
| 4. | "Right Kind of Fool" | Billy Mize | 2:35 |
| 5. | "For the Life of Me" | Joe Allison | 3:00 |
| 6. | "Every Passing Heartbeat" | Allison; Harold Bradley; Bill Ezell | 2:25 |

== Technical personnel ==
All credits are adapted from the liner notes of The Nashville Sound of Jody Miller.

- Jo Allison – Producer
- Bill Justis – Arrangement, conductor
- Charlie McCoy – Arrangement, conductor
- Bill McElhiney – Arrangement, conductor
- Cam Mullins – Arrangement, conductor
- Ed Simpson – Photography

== Charts ==
| Chart (1968) | Peak position |
|---|---|
| US Top Country Albums (Billboard) | 42 |

== Release history ==
| Region | Date | Format | Label | Ref. |
|---|---|---|---|---|
| Australia; North America; United Kingdom | November 1968 | Vinyl LP (Mono); Vinyl LP (Stereo) | Capitol Records | |
| North America | November 2021 | Music download; streaming | Capitol Records Nashville | |
