= Country Girl (Jody Miller album) =

Studio album by Jody Miller
- Released: February 1975
- Recorded: October 1973–November 1974
- Studio: Columbia (Nashville, Tennessee)
- Genre: Country
- Label: Epic
- Producer: Billy Sherrill; Norro Wilson

Jody Miller chronology
House of the Rising Sun (1974)	Country Girl (1975)	Will You Love Me Tomorrow? (1976)

Singles from Country Girl
- 1. "Country Girl" Released: October 1974; 2. "The Best in Me" Released: February 1975

Country Girl is a studio album by American singer Jody Miller. It was released in February 1975 via Epic Records and contained ten tracks of material. It was the eleventh studio album of Miller's career and was an album of country recordings. Among the recordings were two singles that reached the American country songs chart: the title track and "The Best in Me". Country Girl was met with favorable reviews from critics.

== Background, recording and content ==
Jody Miller had her most successful period while being marketed as a country music artist. During the early 1970s, she had top ten hits with remakes of the songs "He's So Fine" and "Baby I'm Yours". Although her commercial appeal began to decline by the mid seventies, she remained with Epic Records through 1979. Among her mid 1970s albums was the studio album Country Girl. It was recorded in sessions between October 1973 and November 1974 at the Columbia Studios in Nashville, Tennessee. While some production featured Billy Sherrill, the album was mostly produced by Norro Wilson. Miller recalled working with Wilson on her official website: "He is so full of talent, it was such a joy to record with him."

Country Girl consisted of ten tracks. Many of the album's recordings were new tracks including the title song, "The Best in Me", "Papa's Wagon", "Love Love Love" and "Jimmy's Roses". Norro Wilson composed two of the new songs: "He Took Me for a Ride" and "I'm Alright Till I SeeYou (Then I Fall Apart)". Some selections were covers of charting Billboard country singles like Dottie West's "House of Love". Other selections were covers of Billboard pop singles like Olivia Newton-John's chart-topping "I Honestly Love You".

== Release and critical reception ==
Country Girl was released in February 1975 by Epic Records. It was the eleventh studio album in Miller's career. Epic distributed the disc as a vinyl LP, featuring five songs on each side of the record. Billboard magazine praised Miller's voice, commenting "Oh how this lady can sing". The magazine also called the song selections as being "fine material" along with "excellent production". Cashbox magazine praised many of the album's new recordings, calling "I'm Alright 'Til I See You" as being "soul-deep". "Jody is not an unfamiliar name to country music and her latest LP will give her reason to enjoy more success," they concluded.

== Chart performance and singles ==
Country Girl reached the number 49 position on the American Billboard Top Country Albums chart in 1975. It was Miller's lowest-charting album on Billboard and the final to chart in her career. Two singles were also spawned from Country Girl. The first was the title track, which Epic originally issued as a single in October 1974. It reached number 41 on the Billboard Hot Country Songs chart. The second and final single spawned from the album was "The Best in Me". It released by Epic in February 1975. It peaked at number 78 on the Billboard country chart in 1975.

== Track listing ==
Side one
No.	Title	Writer(s)	Length
1.	"Country Girl"	Peter Gosling; A. Hawkshaw	2:20
2.	"The Best in Me"	D. Hall	2:40
3.	"Love, Love, Love"	S. Davis; M. Sherrill	2:05
4.	"House of Love"	K. O'Dell	2:31
5.	"In the Name of Love"	E. Montgomery; G. Richey; C. Taylor	2:10

Side two
No.	Title	Writer(s)	Length
1.	"He Took Me for a Ride"	S. Tackitt; C. Taylor; N. Wilson	2:52
2.	"I'm Alright Till I See You (Then I Fall Apart)"	G. Richey; C. Taylor; N. Wilson	3:52
3.	"Papa's Wagon"	C. Taylor	2:53
4.	"I Honestly Love You"	P. Allen; J. Barry	3:41
5.	"Jimmy's Roses"	J. Strickland; C. Taylor	3:22

== Personnel ==
All credits are adapted from the liner notes of Country Girl.

Musical personnel

- Tommy Allsup – Tic Tac guitar
- Larry Butler – Piano
- Jimmy Capps – Rhythm guitar
- Jerry Carrigan – Drums
- Pete Drake – Steel guitar
- Ray Edenton – Rhythm guitar
- Johnny Gimble – Fiddle
- Buddy Harman – Drums
- Holiday Sisters – Vocal accompaniment
- Jerry Kennedy – Lead guitar
- Mike Leech – Bass
- Grady Martin – Lead guitar
- Charlie McCoy – Harmonica, vibes
- The Nashville Edition – Vocal accompaniment
- Hargus "Pig" Robbins – Piano
- Billy Sanford – Lead guitar
- Henry Strzelecki – Bass
- Pete Wade – Rhythm guitar
- Chip Young – Rhythm guitar

Technical personnel

- Bill Barnes – Cover design
- Lou Bradley – Engineering
- Slick Lawson – Photography
- Julie Holiner – Cover design
- Ron Reynolds – Engineering
- Billy Sherrill – Producer
- Norro Wilson – Producer

== Charts ==
Chart (1975)	Peak position
US Top Country Albums (Billboard)	49

== Release history ==
Region	Date	Format	Label	Ref.
North America	February 1975	Vinyl LP	Epic Records	
