= He's So Fine (album) =

Studio album by Jody Miller
- Released: August 1971
- Recorded: February–June 1971
- Studios: Columbia (Nashville, Tennessee)
- Genre: Country
- Label: Epic
- Producer: Billy Sherrill

Jody Miller chronology
Look at Mine (1971)	He's So Fine (1971)	There's a Party Goin' On (1972)

Singles from He's So Fine
- 1. "He's So Fine" Released: May 1971; 2. "Baby I'm Yours" Released: September 1971

He's So Fine is a studio album by American singer Jody Miller. It was released in August 1971 via Epic Records and contained 11 tracks. A majority of the album's material were covers of country and pop songs. Two of its covers were originally released as singles: the title track and "Baby I'm Yours". Both reached the top ten of the North American country charts and reaches other chart positions. The album itself reached the top 20 of the American country chart in 1971.

== Background ==
Jody Miller achieved a commercial breakthrough in 1965 with the single "Queen of the House". It was a top 20 pop single and a top five country song. Over the next several years, Miller recorded a variety of material at Capitol Records. However, she had little success as the decade progressed. Instead, she signed with Epic Records and was guided by producer Billy Sherrill. Sherrill produced her first album on Epic called Look at Mine (1970). In 1971, Sherrill got the idea to re-record The Chiffons's "He's So Fine" after hearing George Harrison's song "My Sweet Lord". According to Miller herself, the song had "the same melody". The song's success inspired the title of Miller's second Epic studio album in 1971.

== Recording and content ==
Sessions for the He's So Fine occurred at the Columbia Studios, located in Nashville, Tennessee. Sherrill oversaw the production of the album and sessions were held between February and June 1971. The album was a collection of 11 songs. Only three of the selections were new material: "I'm Gonna Write a Song", "We Had Love All the Way" and "Make Me Your Kind of Woman". The remaining eight tracks were covers. Covers of country recordings included Jan Howard's charting single "Let Him Have It" and Tammy Wynette's chart-topping "Good Lovin' (Makes It Right)". Pop cover recordings included James Taylor's "You've Got a Friend", Barbara Lewis's "Baby I'm Yours", Elvis Presley's "Don't Be Cruel (To a Heart That's True)", Janis Joplin's "A Woman Left Lonely", Joe South's "Don't Throw Your Love to the Wind" and "He's So Fine". Miller said she especially enjoyed recording her cover of "Don't Be Cruel".

== Release, critical reception and chart performance ==
He's So Fine was originally released in August 1971 by Epic Records. It was the seventh studio album in Miller's recording career and her second with Epic. The label distributed the disc as a vinyl LP, with five songs on "side A" and six songs on "side B". Record World magazine praised Billy Sherrill's selection of songs and they concluded, "So fine indeed". He's So Fine reached the number 12 position on the American Billboard Top Country Albums chart in 1971. It was Miller's highest-charting disc on the country albums survey. It was one of four albums of Miller's to reach the top 20. It also reached number 117 on the Billboard 200 albums chart. It was one of two albums by Miller to reach the chart and it was her highest-charting album there.

== Singles ==
Two singles preceded the release of He's So Fine. The title track was the first single released. It was distributed by Epic in May 1971. It was among Miller's most commercially successful singles, reaching the number five position on the Billboard Hot Country Songs chart, number 53 on the Billboard Hot 100. and number two on the Billboard adult contemporary chart. In Canada, the song reached number three on the RPM Country Tracks survey, number 46 on the RPM Top Singles chart and number one on the RPM Adult Contemporary chart. In Australia, it reached number 28 on their all-genre pop chart. "Baby I'm Yours" was the second single released from the intended project. Epic issued it in September 1971. It also climbed to the number five position on the Billboard country chart, while reaching number 91 on the Hot 100 and number 21 on the adult contemporary chart. On the Canadian RPM surveys, it peaked at number eight on the country chart and number 25 on the adult contemporary chart.

== Track listing ==
Side one
No.	Title	Writer(s)	Length
1.	"He's So Fine"	R. Mack	2:35
2.	"Good Lovin' (Makes It Right)"	B. Sherrill	2:27
3.	"You've Got a Friend"	C. King	4:18
4.	"Baby, I'm Yours"	V. McCoy	3:09
5.	"Don't Throw Your Love to the Wind"	J. South	2:43

Side two
No.	Title	Writer(s)	Length
1.	"A Woman Left Lonely"	S. Oldham; D. Penn	2:44
2.	"We Had Love All the Way"	J. Foster; B. Rice	2:22
3.	"Make Me Your Kind of Woman"	E. Mitchell; N. Wilson	2:56
4.	"Don't Be Cruel (To a Heart That's True)"	O. Blackwell; E. Presley	2:11
5.	"Let Him Have It"	B. Peters	2:09
6.	"I'm Gonna Write a Song"	G. Sutton	2:18

== Technical personnel ==
All credits are adapted from the liner notes of He's So Fine.

- Al Clayton – Cover photo
- The Jordanaires – Background vocals
- The Nashville Edition – Background vocals
- Billy Sherrill – Producer

== Charts ==
Chart (1971)	Peak position
US Billboard 200	117
US Top Country Albums (Billboard)	12

== Release history ==
Region	Date	Format	Label	Ref.
Australia	August 1971	Vinyl LP	Epic Records	
North America	August 1971	Vinyl LP	Epic Records	
United Kingdom	August 1971	Vinyl LP	Epic Records	
North America	2020s	Digital download; streaming	Sony Music Entertainment	
