= Jody Miller Sings the Great Hits of Buck Owens =

Studio album by Jody Miller
- Released: March 1966
- Recorded: January 1966
- Studio: Capitol Studios
- Genre: Country
- Label: Capitol
- Producer: Steve Douglas

Jody Miller chronology
Home of the Brave (1965)	Jody Miller Sings the Great Hits of Buck Owens (1966)	The Nashville Sound of Jody Miller (1968)

Singles from Jody Miller Sings the Great Hits of Buck Owens
- 1. "We're Gonna Let the Good Times Roll" Released: February 1966

Jody Miller Sings the Great Hits of Buck Owens is a studio album by American singer Jody Miller. It was released in March 1966 via Capitol Records and contained 12 tracks. The album was a collection of songs originally recorded and made successful by country singer–songwriter Buck Owens. It was the fourth studio album in Miller's career and received a positive response from Billboard magazine in 1966.

== Background, recording and content ==
Signed as a folk singer to Capitol Records, Jody Miller's debut album was released in 1963. In 1965, she reached commercial success for the first time with "Queen of the House". The song was a number 12 pop single in the United States and reached the top five on their corresponding country chart. Miller started recording more country material after this. She was inspired to record an album of songs by country singer–songwriter Buck Owens while on tour in Germany. "One day, I got a little lonesome and went out and bought several of Buck's LP's. They loved him in Europe and still do. Each song on this album is just as good as the next. So, I felt like it would be a wonderful thing to do an entire cover album of Buck's songs," she explained on her official website.

Jody Miller Sings the Great Hits of Buck Owens was recorded at Capitol Studios, located in Hollywood, California. The sessions were produced by Steve Douglas. The project consisted of 12 songs. All of the song's material had been first recorded by Buck Owens. Many of the original songs had first topped the American country chart when Owens cut them: "Act Naturally", "Love's Gonna Live Here", "My Heart Skips a Beat", "Together Again", "I Don't Care (Just as Long as You Love Me)", "I've Got a Tiger by the Tail", "Before You Go", "Only You (Can Break My Heart)".

== Release, critical reception and singles ==
Jody Miller Sings the Great Hits of Buck Owens was originally released in March 1966 by Capitol Records. It was distributed as a vinyl LP, offered in both mono and stereo versions. Six songs were featured on each side of the disc. It was the fourth studio album of Miller's career. It received a positive review from Billboard following its original release. "Her unique vocal style and fine instrumental support combine for a hit LP," the publication concluded.

According to Miller herself, the album was not successful. "It wasn't well received because a lot of the country people felt we had dropped a ton of bricks on their heads ... it was too different," she explained. The album was later released to digital markets in November 2021, when Capitol chose to re-release all of Miller's albums from the label. One single from the album project was released in February 1966: "We're Gonna Let the Good Times Roll". Released as a seven-inch vinyl single, it included a cover of "I Don't Care" on the B-side.

== Track listing ==
All songs are composed by Buck Owens, except where noted.

Side one
No.	Title	Writer(s)	Length
1.	"Act Naturally"	Voni Morrison; Johnny Russell	2:04
2.	"Love's Gonna Live Here"		1:58
3.	"Crying Time"		2:45
4.	"I Don't Care"		1:53
5.	"Don't Let Him Know"	Buck Owens; Rich B. Owens	2:38
6.	"I've Got a Tiger by the Tail"	Harlan Howard; B. Owens	2:11

Side two
No.	Title	Writer(s)	Length
1.	"We're Gonna Let the Good Times Roll"		2:18
2.	"Under Your Spell Again"	B. Owens; Dusty Rhodes	2:04
3.	"Only You (Can Break My Heart)"		2:25
4.	"My Heart Skips a Beat"		2:11
5.	"Before You Go"	B. Owens; Don Rich	2:05
6.	"Together Again"		2:23

== Technical personnel ==
All credits are adapted from the liner notes of Jody Miller Sings the Great Hits of Buck Owens.

- Steve Douglas – Arranger, producer
- George Jerman – Photography

== Release history ==
Region	Date	Format	Label	Ref.
North America; United Kingdom	March 1966	Vinyl LP (Mono); Vinyl LP (Stereo)	Capitol Records	
North America	November 2021	Music download; streaming	Capitol Records Nashville	
