= Robin McNamara =

American musician (1947–2021)

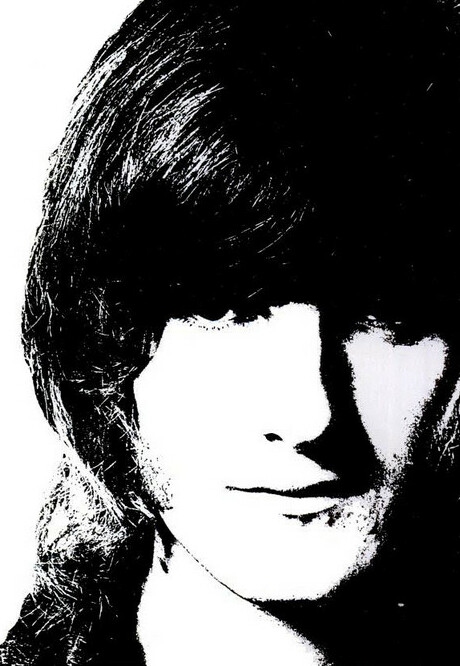
McNamara c. 1970

Robin McNamara (May 5, 1947 – October 21, 2021) was an American musician, singer and songwriter.

McNamara was born in May 1947 in Newton, Massachusetts. In 1963, while in tenth grade, he formed a rock and roll group with a few school friends; they christened their band Robin and the Hoods, performing locally in the New England area with McNamara as the lead vocalist.

In the late 1960s, McNamara relocated to New York City, where he became a cast member of the Broadway musical Hair, playing the lead role of Claude from 1969 to 71. In 1969, he was introduced to composer/record producer Jeff Barry, who signed him to Steed Records.

Together with McNamara's songwriting partner, Jim Cretecos, they wrote a song called "Lay a Little Lovin' on Me", which McNamara took to number 11 on the Billboard Hot 100 chart in the summer of 1970 and number 6 in Canada. The song peaked at number 49 in Australia in June 1970. A lack of further chart success resulted in McNamara being dubbed a one-hit wonder. The follow-up single, "Got To Believe In Love", did reach number 62 in Canada, however.

McNamara died on October 21, 2021, at the age of 74.
