= Land of the Free (Cyberpunk) =

1994 cyberpunk role-playing game adventure

Cover art by Doug Andersen

Land of the Free is a campaign of five adventures published by R. Talsorian Games in 1994 for the near-future dystopian role-playing game Cyberpunk 2020.

== Description ==
Land of the Free is a series of five linked adventures in which a team of edgerunners (player characters) must extract a young woman, Ariana, from a pharmaceutical laboratory in New York, and then safely deliver her to Night City in California. Ariana is very valuable, and on their road trip, the fugitives will be pursued by airborne mercenaries, river pirates, assassins, religious fanatics, fixers, rockers and the Elvises of Graceland.

Each of the five chronologically-linked adventures covers one phase of the overall campaign. The boxed set includes a 120-page softcover book, a large double-sided mapsheet, and two cardstock sheets of cut-apart vehicle counters, as well as some player handouts.

== Publication history ==
The dystopian role-playing game Cyberpunk was created by Michael Pondsmith and released by R. Talsorian Games in 1988. A second edition titled Cyberpunk 2020 was released in 1990, and one of the sourcebooks released for this edition, Land of the Brave, describes a post-apocalyptic North America similar to the setting for a Mad Max movie. In 1994, William Moss created the five-part campaign Land of the Free using the setting described in Home of the Brave. The boxed set featured cover art by Doug Andersen and interior art by Patrick Gidaro, Chris Hockabout, Darrell Midgette, Jean-Michel Ringuet, and Christina Wald.

== Reception ==
In Issue 211 of Dragon, Rick Swan admitted that most previously published adventures for Cyberpunk had been "hit or miss ... most feel like retreads, the contents less interesting than the covers." But Swan was pleasantly surprised by Land of the Free, saying that it "may be the most ambitious cyberpunk adventure ever published. It's certainly the most lavish." Swan thought the text was "well-written", and liked the "generous number of explanatory sidebars (how 21st century airships operate, the future history of the American southwest) and troubleshooting tips (attack routines for cyberdogs, what to do if a PC falls in the water and can't swim)." Swan noted that "The explosive climax takes place in the shipyards of Night City; unless reinforcements show up, it'll take divine intervention to get all the PCs out in one piece." Swan concluded by giving this campaign a rating of 5 out of 6, saying, "with a referee capable of smoothing over the rough spots and cooperative players who aren't sticklers for realism, Land of the Free delivers the goods."

In Issue 18 of the Australian game magazine Australian Realms, Paul Mittig thought the "Quality of the production is quite high, with well-rendered computer maps and evocative non-player character (NPC) and adventure illustrations." Mittig didn't understand why the sheets of vehicle counters had been included since the boxed set did not include any street or road maps scaled to use vehicle counters. Mittig noted that the storyline is linear and the gamemaster would have to push the characters in the right direction from time to time. Mittig also commented that if a gamemaster did not want to run the whole campaign, individual adventures could be played as part of the gamemaster's personal campaign. Mittig concluded, "Either way, your players are going to get a load of hot action in the Land of the Free."

== Other commentary and reviews ==
- Valkyrie #1 (Sept., 1994)
