= Grammy Award for Best New Country & Western Artist =

Music award category

The Grammy Award for Best New Country & Western Artist was presented in 1965 and 1966.

Years reflect the year in which the Grammy Awards were presented, for works released in the previous year.

== Winners & Nominees ==
Year	Winner(s)	Nominees	Ref.
1965	Roger Miller	Charlie Louvin; Connie Smith; Hank Williams Jr.; Dottie West	
1966	The Statler Brothers	Jody Miller; Wilma Burgess; Norma Jean; Del Reeves	
