= Mermaids (soundtrack) =

Mermaids: Music From the Original Motion Picture Soundtrack

Soundtrack album by various artists
- Released: November 13, 1990
- Genres: Pop music Soundtrack album
- Length: 26:08
- Label: Geffen Records
- Producer: various artists

Singles from Music From the Original Motion Picture Soundtrack - Mermaids
- 1. "Baby I'm Yours" Released: October 1990; 2. "The Shoop Shoop Song (It's in His Kiss)" Released: November 7, 1990

The soundtrack album from the film Mermaids, starring Cher, Winona Ryder, Christina Ricci and Bob Hoskins, was released in Europe on November 13, 1990, and on December 8, 1990, in the U.S. The album also peaked at number sixty-five on the Billboard 200. Two singles, both recorded by Cher, were released to promote the soundtrack: "Baby I'm Yours" (originally recorded by Barbara Lewis), released as the first European single, and the worldwide hit "The Shoop Shoop Song (It's in His Kiss)" (originally recorded by Betty Everett), which was released as the second European single. It was also Cher's first single from her album, Love Hurts. In the U.S., "The Shoop Shoop Song" was the first single from the soundtrack.

"Baby I'm Yours" was not a success, only reaching number eighty-nine in the UK Singles Chart. However, "The Shoop Shoop Song" was a worldwide hit, becoming Cher's second number one hit in the UK. The song also peaked in the top ten of almost every European country, but failed to receive much attention in North America, peaking at number thirty-three in the U.S. and number twenty-one in Canada. Although the success in mainstream airplay was not as strong in North America, the song did receive strong adult contemporary airplay in both the U.S. and Canada, peaking at number seven in the U.S. Adult Contemporary chart and number four in the Canadian Adult Contemporary chart.

== Critical reception ==
Professional ratings
Review scores
Source	Rating
AllMusic	3/5 stars

Allmusic's Brian Mansfield gave the album three stars out of five, saying it is "full of whimsical pre-Beatles pop". He specifically described "Sleepwalk" as "gorgeous".

== Track listing ==
No.	Title	Writer(s)	Performers	Length
1.	"The Shoop Shoop Song (It's in His Kiss)"	Rudy Clark	Cher	2:51
2.	"Big Girls Don't Cry"	Bob Crewe, Bob Gaudio	Frankie Valli and The Four Seasons	2:25
3.	"You've Really Got a Hold on Me"	Smokey Robinson	Smokey Robinson and The Miracles	2:57
4.	"It's My Party"	Walter Gold, John Gluck Jr., Herb Weiner	Lesley Gore	2:21
5.	"Johnny Angel"	Lyn Duddy, Lee Pockriss	Shelley Fabares	2:22
6.	"Baby I'm Yours"	Van McCoy	Cher	3:19
7.	"Just One Look"	Gregory Carroll, Doris Payne	Doris Troy	2:26
8.	"Love Is Strange"	Mickey Baker, Sylvia Vanderpool, Ethel Smith	Mickey & Sylvia	2:55
9.	"Sleepwalk"	Santo Farina, Johnny Farina	Santo & Johnny	2:21
10.	"If You Wanna Be Happy"	Joseph Royster, Carmella Guida, Frank Guida	Jimmy Soul	2:11
Total length:				26:08

== Charts ==
Chart (1990)	Peak position
Australian Albums Chart	53
Austrian Albums Chart	29
Canadian Albums Chart	35
European Albums (Top 100)	81
German Albums Chart	55
Norwegian Albums Chart	11
UK Compilations (Official Charts Company)	6
U.S. Billboard 200	65

== Certifications and sales ==
Region	Certification	Certified units/sales
Canada (Music Canada)	Gold	50,000^{^}
United Kingdom (BPI)	Silver	60,000^{^}
^{^} Shipments figures based on certification alone.

== Production and personnel ==
- Performer: Cher
- Producer: Peter Asher
- Performer: Shelley Fabares
- Performer: Frankie Valli
- Performer: The Four Seasons
- Performer: Lesley Gore
- Performer: Mickey & Sylvia
- Performer: The Miracles
- Performer: Santo & Johnny
- Performer: Jimmy Soul
- Performer: Doris Troy
- Performer: Smokey Robinson
- Music supervisor: John Kalodner
- Mastering supervisor: David Donnelly
- Mastering: Dan Hersch
- Coordination: Debra Shallman
- Photography: Kerry Hayes
- Design: Kevin Reagan
- Design: Janet Wolsborn
