= Home of the Brave (song) =

Single by Jody Miller

from the album Home of the Brave
- B-side: "This Is the Life"
- Released: August 1965
- Recorded: July 1965
- Studio: Capitol Studios
- Genre: Folk; teen pop
- Length: 2:50
- Label: Capitol
- Songwriters: Barry Mann; Cynthia Weil
- Producer: Steve Douglas

Jody Miller singles chronology
"Silver Threads and Golden Needles" (1965)	"Home of the Brave" (1965)	"Magic Town" (1965)

"Home of the Brave" is a song recorded and made successful by American singer Jody Miller. It was composed by songwriters Barry Mann and Cynthia Weil. Released as a single by Capitol Records in 1965, "Home of the Brave" reached the pop charts in the United States, Canada and Australia. It was characterized as a protest song for its discussion of social issues during the sixties decade. It was among Miller's most commercially successful recordings in her career despite being banned from radio stations. "Home of the Brave" was released on an album of the same name in 1965.

== Background and content ==
During the 1960s, a variety of music artists recorded protest songs in response to the social issues of the era. These songs openly spoke of concerns related to the civil rights movement and the Vietnam War. Songs exemplifying this included "We Gotta Get Out of This Place" by The Animals (not originally written as a protest song, but adopted as one later by soldiers in Vietnam) and Jay and the Americans's "Only in America". Another protest song of the time was "Home of the Brave". The tune described how a teenage boy chooses to express himself by wearing a different hairstyle and unique clothes. It was then followed by a chorus that questioned why others judged the boy's freedom of expression. "Home of the brave, land of the free, why won't you let him be what he wants to be?" the lyrics went.

"Home of the Brave" was composed by songwriters Barry Mann and Cynthia Weil. The song was brought to the attention of Steve Douglas, a producer at Capitol Records. He ultimately chose to cut the track with then-pop artist, Jody Miller. Miller previously had commercial success with "Queen of the House", a song that broke through on the country and pop charts.

== Recording ==
In 1965, Miller had been sent to New York City to perform on The Jimmy Dean Show. While in New York, she met with Steve Douglas, Barry Mann and Cynthia Weil. Mann and Weil urged Miller not to cut the track because they believed her to be categorized as a country artist. Yet, Douglas believed the song to be a hit and he urged her to record it. Phil Spector had also released a version of the song with a group called Bonnie and the Treasures, produced by Jerry Riopelle. Spector was not happy with Miller recording "Home of the Brave". Despite his opposition, Steve Douglas had Miller record the track. With Douglas producing, the tune was recorded at Capitol Studios in Hollywood, California. The session was held in July 1965.

== Critical reception ==
"Home of the Brave" received several positive reviews following its release. Billboard magazine highlighted the single in their "Pop Spotlights" in August 1965. The publication described it as a "powerful teen message song based upon the town put-down of the boy with the long hair and funny clothes." In his 2003 book Battle Notes, author Lee Andresen highlighted Miller's vocal performance. "What makes Miller's performance of 'Home of the Brave' so effective is that she connected so well with the message it was sending out: 'It says it all, it sums it up'," he wrote. No Depression praised the song when reviewing Miller's compilation Complete Epic Hits, calling it "the terrific protest song".

== Release and chart performance ==
"Home of the Brave" was released as a single by Capitol Records in August 1965. It was distributed as a seven-inch vinyl single. On its B-side was the song "This Is the Life". Miller's version competed with the Bonnie and the Treasures version. While both songs were released, Spector ran advertisements in magazines and newspapers claiming that he had the song first. Nonetheless, it was Miller's version that became commercially successful. Despite being banned from radio stations, it became her best-selling single in the United States. "Home of the Brave" climbed to the number 25 position on America's Billboard Hot 100 chart. It was even more successful in Canada, reaching number five on their RPM Top Singles chart. On the Australian pop chart, it climbed to number 29. It was also her only charting single in the United Kingdom, reaching number 49. "Home of the Brave" served as the title for Miller's third studio album, which was released in October 1965 by Capitol Records.

== Track listing ==
7" vinyl single

- "Home of the Brave" – 2:50
- "This Is the Life" – 2:05

== Charts ==
=== Weekly charts ===
Weekly chart performance for "Home of the Brave"
Chart (1965)	Peak position
Australia (Kent Music Report)	29
Canada Top Pop Singles (RPM)	5
UK Singles (Official Charts)	49
US Billboard Hot 100	25
