= Lay a Little Lovin' on Me =

"Lay A Little Lovin' on Me"

Single by Robin McNamara

from the album Lay A Little Lovin' on Me
- B-side: "I'll Tell You Tomorrow"
- Released: 1970
- Genre: Bubblegum pop
- Length: 3:04
- Label: Steed
- Songwriters: Robin McNamara; Jeff Barry; Jim Cretecos

Robin McNamara singles chronology
"I Can Love You" (1969)	"Lay A Little Lovin' on Me" (1970)	"Got To Believe In Love" (1970)

"Lay a Little Lovin' on Me" is a 1970 song written by Jeff Barry, Robin McNamara, and Jim Cretecos and recorded by Robin McNamara. The song reached number 11 on the Billboard Hot 100, and was McNamara's only hit. "Lay A Little Lovin' On Me" also peaked at number 6 (for two weeks) on Canada's national RPM Top 100 singles chart in August 1970 (number 80 YearEnd), and at number 49 in Australia in 1970. It wasn't his only charting single in Canada - the follow-up single, "Got To Believe In Love", reached number 62.

== Cover versions ==
- A cover version was released by country singer Jody Miller in 1979. It reached number 97 on the Billboard Hot Country Singles chart.
