= Home of the Brave (Jody Miller album) =

Studio album by American singer Jody Miller

Studio album by Jody Miller
- Released: October 1965
- Recorded: June–August 1965
- Studio: Capitol Studios
- Genres: Country; pop
- Label: Capitol
- Producer: Steve Douglas

Jody Miller chronology
Queen of the House (1965)	Home of the Brave (1965)	Jody Miller Sings the Great Hits of Buck Owens (1966)

Singles from Home of the Brave
- 1. "Home of the Brave" Released: August 1965

Home of the Brave is a studio album by American singer Jody Miller. It was released in October 1965 via Capitol Records and contained 11 tracks. The material mixed pop with country songs. Its title track reached the pop charts in several countries including Australia, Canada and the United States. The disc was Miller's third studio album in her career and received a positive review from Billboard following its release.

== Background ==
Jody Miller signed to Capitol Records as a folk recording artist in 1963. However, in 1965, she commercially broke through with a pop and country single called "Queen of the House". Its success was followed by a protest song called "Home of the Brave". The tune described a teenage boy who was criticized in his hometown for his choice of clothing and hairstyle. The song became another pop commercial success. "Home of the Brave" would inspire Capitol to release Miller's third studio album, which would also have the same title.

== Recording and content ==
The Home of the Brave album was recorded in sessions held between June and August 1965 at Capitol Studios, located in Hollywood, California. The album was produced by Steve Douglas and included arrangements by Billy Strange. The disc included both pop and country material. On her official website, Miller herself explained the album was catered towards the teen market and described the disc as "bubblegum". With the country success from "Queen of the House", Capitol had Miller incorporate country material into the album. Among the country songs were covers of "Born to Lose" and "Your Cheatin' Heart". "Just think ... I initiated a lot of those teenagers into loving Country Music!" Miller said on her website. As a whole, the album included both slow ballads and uptempo songs. Among its ballads were "Born to Lose", while others like "Big Time Love" were faster tempo recordings.

== Release, reception and singles ==
Home of the Brave was originally released in October 1965 on Capitol Records. It was distributed as a vinyl LP, offered in both stereo and mono versions. Six songs were featured on side one while five songs were featured on side two. In November 2021, Capitol Records chose to release all of Miller's albums to digital retailers, making Queen of the House available digitally for the first time. Billboard gave the album positive reception following its original release. "Pegging this album upon her current hit, 'Home of the Brave,' this sparkling song stylist offers, in addition, a program of winning performances of country-oriented material," the publication stated. The album's title track was its only single and was first issued in August 1965. The song peaked at number 29 on Australia's pop music chart and reached number 25 on America's Billboard Hot 100 chart. It was most commercially successful in Canada, peaking at number five on their RPM Top Singles chart.

== Track listing ==
Side one
No.	Title	Writer(s)	Length
1.	"Home of the Brave"	Barry Mann; Cynthia Weil	2:48
2.	"Born to Lose"	Ted Daffan	3:22
3.	"Big Time Love"	Paul Hampton	2:42
4.	"In My Room"	Brian Wilson; Gary Usher	2:28
5.	"A Lonely Queen"	J. McCarthy; Billy Strange	3:18
6.	"Only Love Can Break a Heart"	Burt Bacharach; Hal David	2:28

Side two
No.	Title	Writer(s)	Length
1.	"He Hit Me"	Gerry Goffin; Carole King	2:28
2.	"All I Really Want to Do"	Bob Dylan	2:36
3.	"Your Cheatin' Heart"	Hank Williams	2:47
4.	"Let Me Get Close to You"	Goffin; King	2:43
5.	"It Keeps Right On a-Hurtin'"	Johnny Tillotson	3:30

== Technical personnel ==
All credits are adapted from the liner notes of Home of the Brave.

- Steve Douglas – Producer
- George Jerman – Photography
- Billy Strange – Arranger, conductor

== Release history ==
Region	Date	Format	Label	Ref.
North America; United Kingdom	October 1965	Vinyl LP (Mono); Vinyl LP (Stereo)	Capitol Records	
North America	November 2021	Music download; streaming	Capitol Records Nashville	
