= If You Think I Love You Now (I've Just Started) =

Single by Jody Miller

from the album Look at Mine
- B-side: "Lookin' Out My Back Door"
- Released: November 1970
- Recorded: June 1970
- Studio: Columbia (Nashville, Tennessee)
- Genre: Countrypolitan
- Length: 2:30
- Label: Epic
- Songwriters: Curly Putman; Billy Sherrill
- Producer: Billy Sherrill

Jody Miller singles chronology
"Look at Mine" (1970)	"If You Think I Love You Now (I've Just Started)" (1970)	"He's So Fine" (1971)

"If You Think I Love You Now (I've Just Started)" is a song originally recorded by American singer Jody Miller. Composed by Curly Putman and Billy Sherrill, it was released as a single on Epic Records in 1970. It reached the top 20 on the American country chart and the top 30 of the Canadian country chart. It received a positive response from Billboard magazine shortly after its release.

== Background and recording ==
Although first a folk singer, Jody Miller had her first commercial success with the country pop 1965 single "Queen of the House". Although she had several more charting pop recordings during the sixties, Miller obtained greater success as a country artist during the 1970s. During the decade she worked alongside producer Billy Sherrill. His first album with Miller was 1970 disc Look at Mine. The album included her first pair of Epic singles, including "If You Think I Love You Now (I've Just Started)". It was composed by Sherrill himself, along with Curly Putman. Sherrill produced the track at the Columbia Studios in Nashville in June 1970.

== Release, reception and chart performance ==
"If You Think I Love You Now (I've Just Started)" was released by Epic Records in November 1970. It was backed on the B-side by a cover of Creedence Clearwater Revival's "Lookin' Out My Back Door". It was distributed as a seven-inch vinyl single. Billboard described the song as a "powerful entry". The single peaked at number 19 on the American Billboard Hot Country Songs chart and number 29 on the Canadian RPM Country Tracks chart in 1970. It was Miller's second single to make the Billboard country top 20 and her second to chart on RPM country survey. The song set forth a series of commercially successful recordings for Miller on the country charts during the seventies.

== Track listing ==
7" vinyl single

- "If You Think I Love You Now (I've Just Started)" – 3:02
- "Lookin' Out My Back Door" – 2:15

== Charts ==
=== Weekly charts ===
Weekly chart performance for "If You Think I Love You Now (I've Just Started)"
Chart (1970–1971)	Peak position
Canada Country Tracks (RPM)	29
US Hot Country Songs (Billboard)	19
