= There's a Party Goin' On =

Single by Jody Miller

from the album There's a Party Goin' on
- B-side: "Love's the Answer"
- Released: May 1972
- Genre: Country
- Label: Epic
- Songwriters: Billy Sherrill; Glenn Sutton
- Producer: Billy Sherrill

Jody Miller singles chronology
"Let's All Go Down to the River" (1972)	"There's a Party Goin' On" (1972)	"To Know Him Is to Love Him" (1972)

"There's a Party Goin' On" is a single by American country music artist Jody Miller. Released in May 1972, it was the third single from her album There's a Party Goin' On. The song peaked at number 4 on the Billboard Hot Country Singles chart. It also reached number 1 on the RPM Country Tracks chart in Canada.

== Chart performance ==
Chart (1972)	Peak position
U.S. Billboard Hot Country Singles	2
U.S. Billboard Bubbling Under Hot 100	15
U.S. Billboard Easy Listening	23
Canadian RPM Country Tracks	1
Canadian RPM Adult Contemporary	20

== Cover Versions ==
- Nancy Sinatra covered the song, which was included on her 1972 album, Woman, as would Lynn Anderson on her 1972 album Listen to a Country Song.
