= Look at Mine (song) =

Single by Jody Miller

from the album Look at Mine
- B-side: "Safe in These Lovin' Arms of Mine"
- Released: July 1970
- Recorded: June 1970
- Studio: Columbia (Nashville, Tennessee)
- Genre: Countrypolitan
- Length: 2:30
- Label: Epic
- Songwriters: Tony Hatch; Jackie Trent
- Producer: Billy Sherrill

Jody Miller singles chronology
"My Daddy's Thousand Dollars" (1969)	"Look at Mine" (1970)	"If You Think I Love You Now (I've Just Started)" (1970)

"Look at Mine" is a song recorded by American singer Jody Miller. Composed by Tony Hatch and Jackie Trent, it was released as a single on Epic Records in 1970. It reached the top 40 on the North American country charts, setting forth a series of commercially successful singles for Miller in the country genre. It received a positive response from Cashbox magazine shortly after its release.

== Background and recording ==
Jody Miller was first a folk performer in the 1960s, but found her first commercial success with the pop and country song "Queen of the House" in 1965. She had several more charting pop singles during the sixties before working alongside Billy Sherrill in Nashville, Tennessee. Sherrill would produce the recordings that resulted in her first album and pair of singles. Among her first recordings with Sherrill was the track "Look at Mine". The song was written by Tony Hatch and Jackie Trent. Sherrill produced the track at the Columbia Studios in Nashville in June 1970.

== Release, reception and chart performance ==
"Look at Mine" was first released as a single in July 1970 on Epic Records. It was backed on the B-side by the track "Safe in These Lovin' Arms of Mine". It was distributed as a seven-inch vinyl single. Cashbox magazine gave the single a positive response shortly after its release, calling it a "catchy effort" that "merits close attention". The song reached number 21 on the American Billboard Hot Country Songs chart and number 26 on the Canadian RPM Country Tracks chart in 1970. It was Miller's third chart placement on the Billboard country chart and her first entry on the RPM country chart. The song set forth a series of commercially successful recordings for Miller on the country charts during the seventies. The song was included on Miller's debut Epic album also titled Look at Mine.

== Petula Clark Original ==
Petula Clark released Look At Mine as a single in August 1969, reaching No 89 on the Billboard chart (#62 Cashbox), making the single Clark's 18th consecutive Hot 100 hit in the USA. The song was also a hit in Australia reaching #42. In Canada the song peaked at #13 on the AC chart and in the US # 14 on the Billboard AC chart. In the Philippines, the "B" side, "You and I" from Goodbye Mr Chips received greater exposure than Look At Mine and as such became a standard in that country.

== Track listing ==
7" vinyl single

- "Look at Mine" – 2:30
- "Safe in These Lovin' Arms of Mine" – 2:18

== Charts ==
=== Weekly charts ===
Weekly chart performance for "Look at Mine"
Chart (1970)	Peak position
Canada Country Tracks (RPM)	26
US Hot Country Songs (Billboard)	21
