= Look at Mine =

Studio album by Jody Miller
- Released: December 1970
- Recorded: June–August 1970
- Studios: Columbia (Nashville, Tennessee)
- Genre: Country
- Label: Epic
- Producer: Billy Sherrill

Jody Miller chronology
The Nashville Sound of Jody Miller (1968)	Look at Mine (1970)	He's So Fine (1971)

Singles from Look at Mine
- 1. "Look at Mine" Released: July 1970; 2. "If You Think I Love You Now (I've Just Started)" Released: November 1970

Look at Mine is a studio album by American singer Jody Miller. It was released in December 1970 via Epic Records and contained 11 tracks. It was the sixth studio album of Miller's career and her first to be marketed for the country music market. Its tracks were covers and new material. Two singles were featured on the disc: the title track and "If You Think I Love You Now (I've Just Started)". The songs reached top 40 positions on the North American country charts. Look at Mine received a negative review from AllMusic.

== Background ==
Despite first being a folk artist, Jody Miller had her biggest commercial success with 1965's "Queen of the House". The single was a top 20 pop song and a top five country song, setting forth a career in the country music industry. In late sixties, Miller's commercial success faded and she briefly retired. Upon hearing Tammy Wynette's "Stand by Your Man", she contacted the song's producer, Billy Sherrill. The pair soon met and he signed her to a country music recording contract in 1970 at Epic Records. Her first Epic studio album was 1970's Look at Mine, which was a collection of both country and pop songs.

== Recording and content ==
Look at Mine was recorded between June and August 1970 at the Columbia Studios, located in Nashville, Tennessee. Sherrill served as the album's sole producer. Miller enjoyed working alongside Sherrill, as noted on her official website: "None of us who recorded music with Billy producing will ever be the same, except for Tammy Wynette, and she's in Heaven."

The project was a collection of 11 tracks. Miller described the album as being "A little pop, a little country, and darn good songs." Six songs on the project were new recordings: the "A Week and a Day", title track, "Catch Me in the Morning", "If You Think I Love You Now (I've Just Started)", "Safe in These Lovin' Arms of Mine" and "I'll Never Love Again". The remaining five songs were covers, four which being pop covers. This included Anne Murray's top ten single "Snowbird", Peter, Paul and Mary's number one song "Leaving on a Jet Plane", Creedence Clearwater Revival's top five song "Lookin' out My Back Door". Other covers were originally country singles. This included of Tammy Wynette's chart-topping Billboard country songs: "Stand by Your Man" and "He Loves Me All the Way".

== Release, reception and singles ==
Professional ratings
Review scores
Source	Rating
Allmusic	2/5 stars

Look at Mine was originally released in December 1970 by Epic Records. It was the sixth studio album of her career and her first with Epic. The label distributed the disc as a vinyl LP. Five songs were included on "Side A" and six songs were included on "Side B". It was later released digitally by Sony Music Entertainment. It received a negative review from AllMusic, which only rated the album two out of five stars. Reviewer Greg Adams compared Miller's voice to that of Bobbie Gentry's but criticized the mixed amount of material: "The wide variety of songs she recorded and her chameleonic vocals prevented Miller from establishing a signature sound. As a consequence, the stylistically diverse Look at Mine lacks cohesion but offers a fair sampling of the many kinds of music Miller made." Look at Mine peaked at number 20 on the American Billboard Top Country Albums chart in 1970.

A total of two singles were included on Look at Mine. The first single originally released was the title track, which Epic issued in July 1970. The song reached number 21 on the Billboard Hot Country Songs chart. On the Canadian RPM Country Tracks chart, it climbed to number 26. "If You Think I Love You Now (I've Just Started)" was then released as a single in November 1970. It reached number 19 on the Billboard country chart and number 29 on the RPM country chart.

== Track listing ==
Side one
No.	Title	Writer(s)	Length
1.	"Look at Mine"	T. Hatch; J. Trent	2:31
2.	"Snowbird"	G. MacLellan	2:07
3.	"Leaving on a Jet Plane"	J. Denver	3:45
4.	"A Week and a Day"	J. Stampley	2:41
5.	"If You Think I Love You Now (I've Just Started)"	C. Putman; B. Sherrill	3:02

Side two
No.	Title	Writer(s)	Length
1.	"Lookin' Out My Back Door"	J. C. Fogerty	2:15
2.	"Safe in These Lovin' Arms of Mine"	E. Mitchell; B. Sherrill; N. Wilson	2:20
3.	"Catch Me in the Morning"	D. Sampson; R. Van Hoy	2:05
4.	"Stand by Your Man"	B. Sherrill; T. Wynette	2:40
5.	"I'll Never Love Again"	R. Griff	2:09
6.	"He Loves Me All the Way"	B. Sherrill; C. Taylor; T. Wynette	2:27

== Technical personnel ==
All credits are adapted from the liner notes of Look at Mine.

- The Jordanaires – Background vocals
- Jimmy Moore – Cover photo
- Billy Sherrill – Producer

== Charts ==
Chart (1970)	Peak position
US Top Country Albums (Billboard)	20

== Release history ==
Region	Date	Format	Label	Ref.
North America	November 1970	Vinyl LP (Stereo)	Epic Records	
North America	2010s	Music download; streaming	Sony Music Entertainment	
