= Land of the Free (Martin Zobel album) =

Studio album by Martin Zobel & Soulrise
- Released: June 19, 2012
- Genre: Reggae, Roots Reggae
- Length: 58:09
- Label: VIBRATION RECORDS/VPAL

Land of the Free is the latest studio album by a German reggae singer Martin Zobel and his band Soulrise. It was released on May 18, 2012 in Europe and ranked in #1 on German Amazon Reggae Charts.

In the United States, "Land of the Free" was released on June 19, 2012 under VPAL/IRIE VIBRATION RECORDS.

Fully Fullwood, a legendary Jamaican roots reggae bassist/musician and producer is associated in producing "Land of the Free". George "Fully" Fullwood is also known as the founder and a leader of the #1 recording/backing Jamaican reggae band, Soul Syndicate.

== Track listing ==
No.	Title	Length
1.	"Earth Wind & Fire"	5:25
2.	"Take it Easy"	5:10
3.	"Land of the Free"	5:45
4.	"They Got Soul"	4:57
5.	"Where You Came from"	4:06
6.	"Legends"	4:47
7.	"Our Voices"	3:58
8.	"What You Love"	3:55
9.	"Slow Runner"	3:09
10.	"Why Not?"	3:46
11.	"Never Let You Down"	4:23
12.	"We Want More"	4:11
13.	"Live it Up"	5:21
Total length:		58:09
