= Wednesday's Child Is Full of Woe =

Studio album by Jody Miller
- Released: 1963
- Recorded: December 1962 – January 1963
- Studio: Capitol Studios
- Genre: Folk
- Label: Capitol
- Producer: Kermit Walter

Jody Miller chronology
Wednesday's Child Is Full of Woe (1963)	Queen of the House (1965)

Wednesday's Child Is Full of Woe is a studio album by American singer Jody Miller. It was released in 1963 via Capitol Records and contained twelve tracks. It was the debut studio album of Miller's career and consisted of traditional folk songs. At the time of its release, Miller was a folk artist and was being promoted as such. It received a positive review from Cash Box.

== Background, recording and content ==
Jody Miller had recently moved to Los Angeles, California and then signed with Capitol Records as a folk performer. Her debut studio album would be released in 1963 titled Wednesday's Child Is Full of Woe. "I was very into Folk Music at the time," Miller recalled on her official website. The album was recorded at Capitol Studios, located in Hollywood, California. Sessions took place between December 1962 and January 1963. It was produced by Kermit Walter.

The recording sessions were backed by The Wrecking Crew, a group that featured Billy Strange and future artist Glen Campbell. The project consisted of 12 songs in total. According to the liner notes, the material for the album was songs Miller learned as a child. According to Miller herself, her favorite songs on the album were "The Hangman", "Railroad Boy" and "Butterfly".

== Release and reception ==
Wednesday's Child Is Full of Woe was released in 1963 on Capitol Records. It was originally distributed as a vinyl LP, offered in both mono and stereo versions. The original disc featured six songs on either side of the record. In 2021, Capitol released her entire catalog from the label to digital retailers which included her debut album. Cash Box magazine gave the disc a positive review in June 1963, calling her "a talent to watch". The magazine further commented, "The lark has a rich, deep, vibrant wide-range voice and a distinctive feelingful style of phrasing."

The album helped Miller secure an opportunity to promote material on Tom Paxton's folk television show in 1963. However, the album was not a commercial success. "By the time I cut my first LP with Capitol, folk music was on its way out," she told The Oklahoman. Miller would go on to have her commercial breakout single with 1965's "Queen of the House". She would have further success in the pop and country genres through the 1970s.

== Track listing ==
Side one
No.	Title	Writer(s)	Length
1.	"Railroad Boy" (adapted and arranged by Jody Miller)	Traditional	2:12
2.	"Another Love"	Jack Marshall	2:05
3.	"On the Other Side of the Mountain"	Jimmy Love	2:10
4.	"All My Trials" (adapted and arranged by Jody Miler)	Traditional	2:25
5.	"Lonely Am I"	Tom Glazer	2:52
6.	"Midnight Special" (adapted and arranged by Jody Miller)	Traditional	2:50

Side two
No.	Title	Writer(s)	Length
1.	"Butterfly"	Ken Curtis	1:51
2.	"Last Night a Little Girl Grew Up"	Marshall	2:25
3.	"The Garden of My Heart"	Bob Klimes; Gene Malone	1:37
4.	"Wednesday's Child"	Klimes; Malone	2:40
5.	"The Hangman"	Randy Sparks	2:38
6.	"Evergreen Tree" (adapted and arranged by Jody Miller)	Traditional	1:53

== Release history ==
Region	Date	Format	Label	Ref.
North America	1963	LP Mono; LP Stereo	Capitol Records	
North America	2021	Music download; streaming	Capitol Records Nashville	
