= Home of the Brave (Cyberpunk) =

Home of the Brave is a 1992 role-playing game supplement published by R. Talsorian Games for Cyberpunk.

== Contents ==
Home of the Brave is a supplement in which the collapse of old America and the rise of a cyberpunk‑era nation are outlined, detailing its society, government, military, and offering adventure hooks.

== Reviews ==
- Australian Realms #13
- Backstab #2
- Windgeflüster (Issue 27 - Oct 1994)
