= Jody Miller =

American singer (1941–2022)

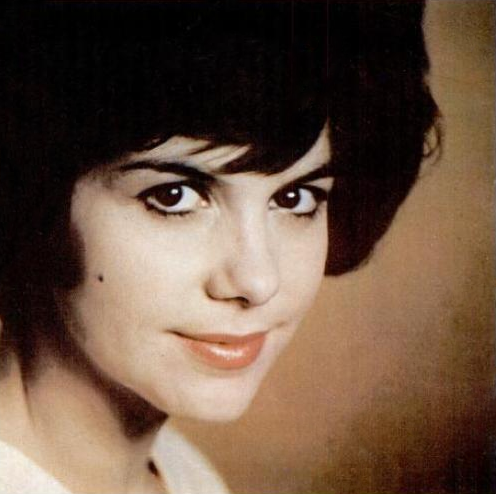
- Miller in a trade ad for her 1965 single, "Queen of the House"
- Born: Myrna Joy Miller; November 29, 1941; Phoenix, Arizona, U.S.
- Died: October 6, 2022 (aged 80); Blanchard, Oklahoma, U.S.
- Occupation: Singer
- Years active: 1963–2022
- Known for: "Queen of the House"
- Spouse: Monty Brooks (m. 1962)
- Children: 1
- Musical career
- Origin: Blanchard, Oklahoma
- Genres: Country; folk; gospel; patriotic; pop
- Instruments: Vocals; guitar
- Labels: Capitol; Epic; Jody Miller Music; Amethyst; Zero; C.E.O. Nashville; White Dove; Heart of Texas
- Website: jodymillermusic.com

Myrna Joy "Jody" Miller (November 29, 1941 – October 6, 2022) was an American singer, who had commercial success in the genres of country, folk and pop. She was the second female artist to win a country music accolade from the Grammy Awards, which came off the success of her 1965 song "Queen of the House". By blending multiple genres together, Miller's music was considered influential for other music artists.

Miller was born in Arizona, but raised in Blanchard, Oklahoma. With a passion for folk music, she moved to Los Angeles, California following high school to pursue a music career. Her singing attracted the attention of Capitol Records, which signed her to a recording contract in 1963. The label released her debut studio album titled Wednesday's Child Is Full of Woe in 1963. It was Miller's answer song to Roger Miller's "King of the Road" titled "Queen of the House" that became her first commercial success. It became a top 20 pop song and a top five country song. It was followed by the top 25 pop single "Home of the Brave" that discussed social conformity. Miller remained at Capitol recording various material until 1969.

Miller was then signed to the country music label, Epic Records. Under the direction of Billy Sherrill, she remade pop hits into singles for the country market. She had top ten country singles with covers of "He's So Fine" (1971), "Baby I'm Yours" (1971) and original songs like "There's a Party Goin' On" (1972). The Epic label released a series of singles and albums that made the North American country music charts through the end of the 1970s. She was nominated for another Grammy for Epic material and appeared on several popular country television programs during the decade.

Miller left her recording career in the early 1980s. She spent time with her domestic duties and to assist her husband's new business raising quarter horses in Oklahoma. In 1988, she returned with a pair of new studio albums including a project of patriotic music called My Country. It attracted the attention of George H. W. Bush, who had Miller perform at his campaign rallies and other presidential events. In the 1990s, Miller found solace in the religion of Christianity and released several albums of gospel material. This included Real Good Feelin (1992) and Higher (1999). Miller continued her career through the 2020s, before her death from Parkinson's disease in 2022.

== Early life ==
Myrna Joy Miller was born in Phoenix, Arizona in 1941 while her family was on their way to start a new life in Oakland, California. She was the youngest of four sisters born to Johnny Bell Miller and Fay Miller. Miller's father was a mechanic, who made fiddles and played them too. Her mother was a homemaker who enjoyed singing around the house. Together, Miller would sing harmony with her four sisters. Her parents discovered their daughter's unique singing ability and entered her in talent contests during her early childhood. Miller's father also illegally brought her into bars where his daughter would stand on tables singing. She became locally known as "the little girl with the big voice".

Mr. and Mrs. Miller divorced when their daughter was eight. She took a Greyhound bus and ended up in Blanchard, Oklahoma where she was raised by her paternal grandmother. At her grandmother's home, she heard Mario Lanza singing "La donna è mobile". "That is when I first realized that I would be a singer. I was bitten," Miller wrote on her official website. She also joined choir in high school and sang in a trio that performed songs by The McGuire Sisters. Miller graduated from Blanchard High School in 1959. She then got a job as a secretary in Oklahoma City and learned to sing folk music.

Miller was performing in coffeehouses throughout her local area. She was singing in one particular coffeehouse in Norman, Oklahoma when she was heard by Lou Gottlieb. Impressed by her singing, Gottlieb encouraged Miller to move to California. However, she turned down his offer and married instead. Shortly after her wedding, Miller and husband moved to Los Angeles, California in hopes of launching her music career. The couple got in touch with Gottlieb, who brought her in contact with his agent. However, Miller did not like Gottlieb's agent. She instead contacted actor Dale Robertson, who was connected to her husband's family. Robertson helped Miller get an audition with Capitol Records and she signed with the label in 1963. The label then changed her name from "Myrna Miller" to "Jody Miller".

== Career ==
=== 1963–1969: "Queen of the House" and success in multiple genres ===
At Capitol, Miller was signed as a folk recording artist. In 1963, the label released her debut LP titled Wednesday's Child Is Full of Woe. Its background session performers included Cher and Glen Campbell, both of whom were not yet individual recording artists. Miller then made appearances on Tom Paxton's folk television show. The album failed to become a commercial success due to the decline of folk music's popularity. Miller's career was then taken into other genres. In 1964, her debut single "He Walks Like a Man" made America's Billboard pop chart. In Australia, it climbed into the top ten. In 1965, Miller participated in Italy's Sanremo Festival as a team companion of Pino Donaggio. Since the festival was created as a composers' competition, Miller and Donaggio presented differently arranged versions of the entry "Io che non vivo (senza te)". The song came placed at number seven and was moderately successful in Italy. It was then recorded in English by Dusty Springfield and released as "You Don't Have to Say You Love Me".

Upon returning to the United States, Miller was given a new record producer named Steve Douglas. Douglas was given a song recently written in response to Roger Miller's (no relation) cross-genre hit "King of the Road". Titled "Queen of the House", the song described the domestic duties of a housewife. Douglas believed the song to be a hit and had [Jody] Miller cut the track while "King of the Road" was still on the charts. "Queen of the House" was then rush-released as a single in 1965 and was played simultaneously with "King of the Road". It reached number 12 on the Billboard pop chart, number four on the Billboard adult contemporary chart and number five on the Billboard Hot Country Songs chart. Miller's second LP of the same name then appeared on Capitol in June 1965. At the 8th Annual Grammy Awards, Miller took home the Best Female Country Vocal Performance accolade, becoming only the second female artist to win a country Grammy.

Miller toured amidst her commercial breakthrough. Among her gigs was a tour of Hawaii alongside The Beach Boys. Capitol Records paired Miller alongside The Rolling Stones for television appearances including Shindig! and Hollywood a Go-Go. A new agent booked her for shows with entertainers Bob Hope and Bob Newhart. Miller's follow-up singles made the pop charts in North America and Australia. This included "Silver Threads and Golden Needles" (1965) along with "Home of the Brave" (1965). The latter recording reached number 25 on the Billboard pop chart, number 29 in Australia and number five on Canada's RPM Top Singles chart. The song was considered "anti-establishment" because it described how a boy was banned from public school for dressing different than the other children. It was banned from many radio stations yet was Miller's best-selling single in the United States. "I loved that song. Unfortunately it got a bad rep," she said in 2020.

Miller's country radio success from "Queen of the House" also influenced her label to have her record more country music, despite her original opposition to the genre. Ultimately, she ended up enjoying recording the genre. "They gave me a Grammy Award for 'Queen of the House', and it thrust me into country and western music," she told Texas Hot Country magazine. Producer Steve Douglas attempted to embed country into Miller's Capitol recordings, but his formula was not successful. "They saw right through us! We weren't country people," she explained in 2018. Despite this, Capitol issued a country album of Buck Owens songs in 1966 and another country album in 1968 titled The Nashville Sound of Jody Miller. The latter featured a cover of "Long Black Limousine", a song about a funeral procession. Although Elvis Presley recorded its most notable version, Miller's cover made the Billboard country chart in 1968.

=== 1970–1979: Country music focus and newfound commercial success ===
Miller briefly retired from her music career due to limited commercial success and a lack of well-run management. Instead her family moved back to Oklahoma and spent time on their newly acquired ranch. Miller was determined to restart her career after hearing Tammy Wynette's "Stand by Your Man". She located the song's producer, Billy Sherrill, called his office in Nashville and the two later met. This led to her signing a country music recording contract with Epic Records in 1970. The first Sherrill-produced album was Look at Mine in 1970. The album included both country and pop tunes and reached the top 20 of the Billboard country albums chart. Both of the LP's singles (the title track and "If You Think I Love You Now") reached the top 40 of the American and Canadian country charts.

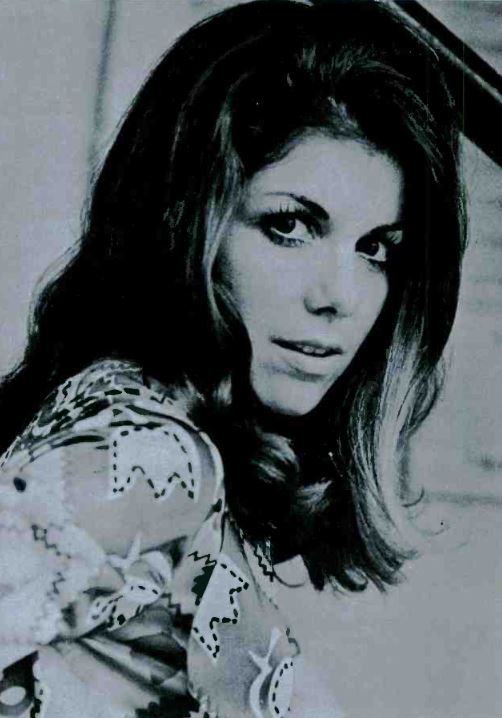
Miller in a publicity photo in Cashbox magazine, 1971

At first, Sherrill found it challenging to find Miller's musical identity. This was because Miller did not have the phrasing of a country performer. His idea instead was to pair Miller's voice with older pop songs and rework them for the country market. "We were pioneers of sorts putting pop music into country and we sold a lot of records," she recalled in 1990. Miller's 1971 remake of The Chiffons's "He's So Fine" reached number five on the Billboard country chart, crossed over to number 53 on the Billboard Hot 100 and reached the number two position on the Billboard adult contemporary chart. Her next Epic LP (also titled He's So Fine) reached number 12 on the Top Country Albums chart in 1971. The song brought Miller her second nomination from Grammy Awards. Miller had continued country chart success during the early 1970s.

Her next single was a cover of "Baby I'm Yours", which reached the Billboard country top five and Canada's RPM top ten. She also covered "To Know Him Is to Love Him" and "Be My Baby", which both reached the top 20 respectively. According to Miller, Billy Sherrill made decisions about what she would record. It was often difficult for him to find quality material because Miller was not a songwriter. "I had to wait until someone brought me some songs," she told Wide Open Country.

Some of the songs Miller recorded were new material. Her 1972 single "There's a Party Goin' On" was penned by Sherrill and Glenn Sutton. It became her highest peaking country single, climbing to number four on the Billboard country chart and number one on the RPM country chart. A subsequent LP of the same name reached the Billboard country top 30. Miller's next pair of singles were also original recordings: "Good News" and "Darling, You Can Always Come Back Home". Both reached the Billboard and RPM top ten in 1973. The singles appeared on her 1973 LP, Good News!, which reached number 18 on the country LP's chart.

Despite several years of country commercial success, her popularity began to wane by 1974. Among her final top 40 country singles was a cover of "The House of the Rising Sun". The Epic label continued releasing Miller's material regularly despite reaching progressively lower chart positions. Fourteen more songs made the Billboard Hot Country Songs chart. However, most of these singles made entry-level positions. Among her chart records were covers of "(You Make Me Feel Like) A Natural Woman", "Will You Love Me Tomorrow", "I Wanna Love My Life Away" and "Lay a Little Lovin' on Me". An original 1976 single, "When the New Wears Off Our Love", went to number 25 on the Billboard country chart. Its subsequent album, Here's Jody Miller, was considered Miller's "best late-period LP" by writers Robert K. Oermann and Mary A. Bufwack, who noted its Linda Ronstadt influence. Her final chart appearance occurred in 1979 and her Epic contract expired the same year.

=== 1980–2022: Semi-retirement and new musical directions ===
Miller went into a period of semi-retirement after her Epic contract ended. She supported her husband's quarter horse business and attended to domestic duties on her Oklahoma ranch. In the late eighties, Miller got the idea to record an album of American patriotic music. People around her did not believe it would be successful and told her she was "crazy". In 1988, My Country was released by the independent Amethyst label on cassette. It included covers of "The Star-Spangled Banner" and "The Ragged Old Flag". It was discovered by future American Republican president George H. W. Bush, who was then campaigning. Bush was impressed by Miller's album and asked her to perform at some of his campaign stops. Despite being a registered Democrat, Miller agreed to the performances. Miller then performed at the Presidential inaugural ball after he was elected. "It was one of the highlights of my life," she later said.

In 1988, the Amethyst label also issued an album of country recordings titled A Home for My Heart. Miller's daughter Robin coaxed her into recording as a mother-daughter duo and the pair attempted to sign a country music recording contract in Nashville. Their first gig was at the 1989 Oklahoma State Fair. "Robin and I really do split the vocals 50–50, so we're more like the Everly Brothers than the Judds. It's an honest sound," she told the press in 1990. However, they were unsuccessful. Despite not getting a major-label contract, the duo recorded an album. Under the names "Jody and Robin", the duo independently released Real Good Feelin in 1991.

In 1993, Miller discovered Christianity and began recording music in the gospel format in the years that followed. "It's the gift that I've been given, to sing. I think my Lord deserves recognition for that ... so I love to use that gift," she later commented. On independent record labels, Miller released I'll Praise the Lamb and The Baby from Bethlehem, both in 1996. It was followed in 1999 by another gospel project titled Higher.

In the final years of her career, Miller formed a trio with daughter Robin and grandson Montana. They played gigs and concerts under the name Jody Miller and Three Generations. The trio performed throughout the state of Oklahoma by opening their shows together, followed by Miller performing her own songs and concluded by her family performing separately. Following Miller's death in 2022, the Heart of Texas label released an extended play of her final recordings titled Wayfaring Stranger. The project was described as being a collection of "old-time spirituals".

== Artistry ==
Miller's artistry was defined by the musical genres of folk, country, gospel, and pop. Critics have commented that Miller's musical versatility lacked consistency for her as an artist. In reviewing her 1970 Look at Mine album, Greg Adams of AllMusic commented, "The wide variety of songs she recorded and her chameleonic vocals prevented Miller from establishing a signature sound." In reviewing one of her compilations, Richie Unterberger wrote, "Miller is most often categorized as a country singer, but in the 1960s she was actually pretty eclectic, roving among and combining country, folk, pop, and girl group-like pop\rock. That means there isn't much stylistic consistency here, though there are some good songs." On her own artistic diversity, Miller commented, "I like to sing all kinds of songs, so I didn't fit into a mold."

Writers have also remarked on Miller's voice. Greg Adams commented that Miller's voice resembled that of Bobbie Gentry's but with more "technical ability". In a separate AllMusic review, Adams commented that Miller's also drew similarities to that of sixties pop singer Vicki Carr and found that it lacks any "rural or working-class character" in comparison to country performers. Ed Shanahan of The New York Times described Miller's as "a versatile singer with a rich, resonant voice".

== Legacy ==
Miller's fusion of country, folk and pop were said to influence other female artists that followed. Writers Mary A. Bufwack and Robert K. Oermann described Miller as having a "variety pack approach" to her musical style, influencing crossover future country crossover artists like Linda Ronstadt, Jennifer Warnes and Nicolette Larson. They further commented on Miller's legacy, "The country-pop approach Jody pioneered was a profitable one for many successors." Greg Adams commented that Miller, along with Jan Howard and Jeannie Seely "pioneered pop-oriented country music in the '60s, and their sound has since come to dominate the field."

In 2018, Miller was among several recording artists that were inducted into the Oklahoma Music Hall of Fame. In 2021, Miller's hometown of Blanchard named a new performing arts center after Miller. In November 2021, she participated in a ceremony dedicated to its opening. It will be named the "Jody Miller Performing Arts Center" Miller's career was also shown in a Grammy exhibit titled Stronger Together: The Power of Women in Country Music that was shown at the Woody Guthrie Center in Tulsa, Oklahoma.

== Personal life and death ==
In January 1962 Miller married her high school sweetheart, Monty Brooks. The couple lived in Los Angeles, California for the first eight years of the marriage. In 1965 Miller gave birth to her only child, Robin. In 1970, the family moved to Blanchard, Oklahoma so their daughter could attend school in their home state. For many years, Brooks and Miller operated a quarter horse breeding and training business on their Blanchard ranch.

Miller was diagnosed with Parkinson's disease in the final seven years of her life. She died on October 6, 2022, in Blanchard, Oklahoma, from complications caused by the disease, at age 80.

== Discography ==
Studio albums

- Wednesday's Child Is Full of Woe (1963)
- Queen of the House (1965)
- Home of the Brave (1965)
- Jody Miller Sings the Great Hits of Buck Owens (1966)
- The Nashville Sound of Jody Miller (1968)
- Look at Mine (1970)
- He's So Fine (1971)
- There's a Party Goin' On (1972)
- Good News! (1973)
- House of the Rising Sun (1974)
- Country Girl (1975)
- Will You Love Me Tomorrow? (1976)
- Here's Jody Miller (1977)
- My Country (1988)
- A Home for My Heart (1988)
- Real Good Feelin' (1991) (as Jody & Robin)
- Greatest Hits (1992)
- I'll Praise the Lamb (1996)
- The Baby from Bethlehem (1996)
- Higher (1999)
- Bye Bye Blues (2002)

== Awards and nominations ==
Year	Nominee / work	Award	Result	Ref.
1965	Academy of Country Music Awards	Top Female Vocalist	Nominated	
1966	8th Annual Grammy Awards	Best Country & Western Vocal Performance, Female: "Queen of the House"	Won	
1966	8th Annual Grammy Awards	Best New Country & Western Artist	Nominated	
1968	Academy of Country Music Awards	Top Female Vocalist	Nominated	
1971	Billboard	Top Female Vocalist – Albums	Nominated	
1971	Billboard	Top Female Vocalist – Singles	Nominated	
1971	Record World	Top Female Vocalist	Nominated	
1972	14th Annual Grammy Awards	Best Country Vocal Performance, Female: "He's So Fine"	Nominated	
1972	Billboard	Artist Resurgence of the Year – Female	Won	
1972	Billboard	Top Female Vocalist – Albums	Nominated	
1972	Billboard	Top Female Vocalist – Singles	Nominated	
1972	Cashbox	Best Female Vocalist	Nominated	
1972	Cashbox	Best New Duo (with Johnny Paycheck)	Nominated	
1972	Country Music Association Awards	Vocal Duo of the Year (with Johnny Paycheck)	Nominated	
1972	Record World	Most Promising Duo (with Johnny Paycheck)	Won	
1972	Record World	Top Female Vocalist – Singles	Nominated	
1972	Record World	Top Female Vocalist – Albums	Nominated	
1973	Billboard	Top Female Vocalist – Albums	Nominated	
1973	Billboard	Top Female Vocalist – Singles	Nominated	
1976	Cashbox	Top Female Vocalist	Nominated	
2017	Oklahoma Music Hall of Fame	Hall of Fame	Inducted	
