= Long Black Limousine =

Song by Vern Stovall and Bobby George

Song by Elvis Presley

from the album From Elvis in Memphis
- Released: June 17, 1969
- Length: 3:44
- Label: RCA Victor
- Songwriters: Vern Stovall, Bobby George
- Producers: Chips Moman, Felton Jarvis

"Long Black Limousine" is a song written by Vern Stovall and Bobby George around 1958. The first released version was Stovall's, which came out in 1961.

Its inclusion on Elvis Presley album From Elvis in Memphis, which was released by RCA Records on June 2, 1969, brought the song widespread attention in terms of American popular culture. Presley's melodramatic, soul-influenced version, incorporating the approach of other musical covers recorded in Memphis, Tennessee, gained notice over time as the aforementioned album became regarded as one of his greatest releases.

== Background ==
Stovall and George, country musicians based in southern California, had Wynn Stewart first record their song in 1958, but this recording was not released until many years later.

== Cover versions ==
Many other artists have covered the song, including:

- in 1964, Bobby Bare covered the song and included it on his album The Travelin' Bare
- Glen Campbell recorded the song in 1962, and included it on his album Big Bluegrass Special
- Merle Haggard included it on his 1967 album Branded Man
- In 1968, Jody Miller recorded the only charting single of the song, reaching number 73 on the US country chart. This version was included on her 1968 album The Nashville Sound of Jody Miller
- O. C. Smith's version was released as the B-side of his million-selling crossover hit "Little Green Apples" in 1968
- Elvis Presley's version appeared on his 1969 From Elvis in Memphis album, and is the best-known recording of the song
- Jeannie Seely (1968)
- Connie Smith (1969)
- The Flying Burrito Brothers (1969)
- The Grateful Dead (1969)
- Doug Jernigan (1970)
- Rattlesnake Annie with Willie Nelson (1982 single, 1985 Country Livin' album)
- Carl Rutherford (2001)
- Barb Jungr (2005)
