= Baby I'm Yours (Barbara Lewis song) =

1965 single by Barbara Lewis

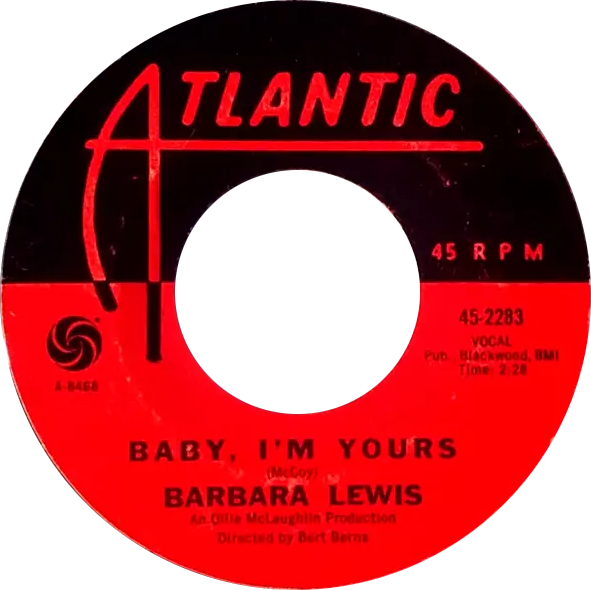
- One of side-A labels of the US single

Single by Barbara Lewis

from the album Baby I'm Yours
- B-side: "I Say Love"
- Released: June 1965
- Genre: R&B
- Length: 2:30
- Label: Atlantic
- Songwriter: Van McCoy
- Producers: Bert Berns; Ollie McLaughlin

Barbara Lewis singles chronology
"Pushin' a Good Thing Too Far" (1964)	"Baby I'm Yours" (1965)	"Make Me Your Baby" (1965)

"Baby I'm Yours" is a song written by Van McCoy which was a hit in 1965 for Barbara Lewis, the original recording artist and featured on her album of the same name.

== Composition and original recording ==
Barbara Lewis first recorded "Baby I'm Yours" in a January 8, 1965 session at Atlantic Recording Studios in New York City directed by Bert Berns with the producer credit assigned to Lewis's manager Ollie McLaughlin. The session for the track featured Teacho Wiltshire conducting his orchestra, whose personnel included Clark Terry and Dud Bascomb (trumpets), Jimmy Cleveland and Tony Studd (trombones), Frank Haywood Henry (baritone sax), Charlie Brown (tenor sax), Paul Griffin (piano), Bill Suyker (guitar), Jimmy Lewis (bass), Gary Chester (drums), and Artie Butler (percussion/ handclaps); the harmony background vocals on the track were provided by the song's composer, Van McCoy, singing with Kendra Spotswood

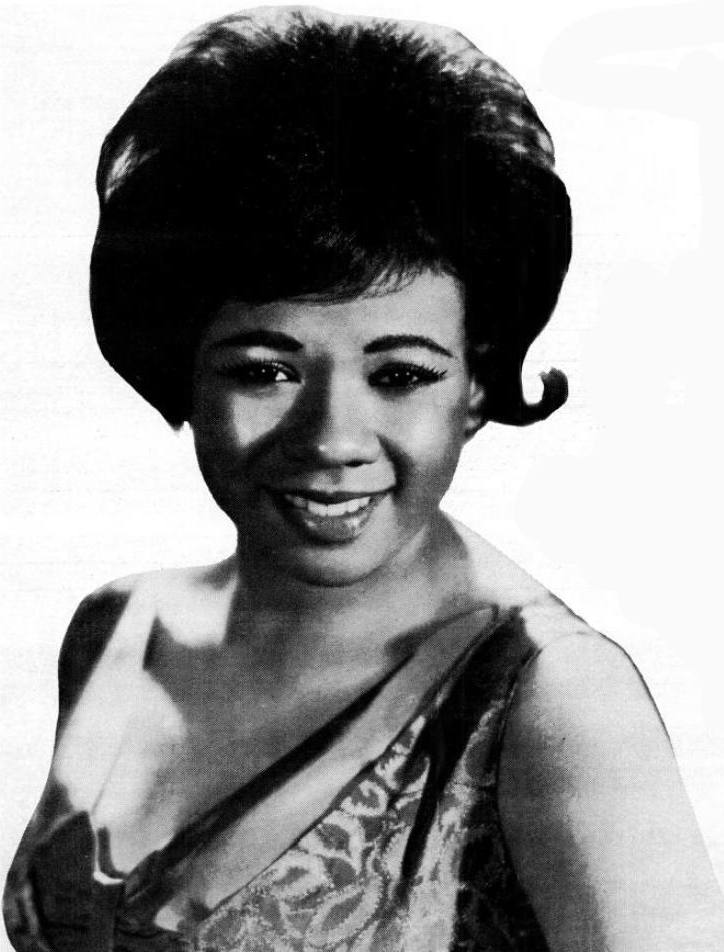
Barbara Lewis, 1966

Barbara Lewis has stated that Van McCoy wrote "Baby I'm Yours" specifically for her. When she first heard the demo for "Baby I'm Yours" Lewis disliked the song—she has suggested that she actually was daunted by the high quality of the vocal, by McCoy himself, on the demo—and at the original session "I didn't really put 100% into my vocal performance" hoping that Atlantic would shelve the track as sub-par. "Ollie [McLaughlin] told me 'Barbara, we're gonna have to go back to Detroit and dub you in. We gotta do your vocals over. You're just not giving like you should on the song.' We did several takes [in Detroit] and he was wondering 'How am I going to get this girl to give? She's so hard-headed.' He said 'You know, Barbara, Karen can sing that song better than you.' That was his little daughter. And it pissed me off. I did one more take, and that was the take that they selected." It has also been reported that Lewis dubbed her vocal in a Chicago studio.

== Commercial performance ==
Released in April 1965, Lewis' "Baby I'm Yours" enjoyed staggered regional success exemplified by the single reaching #1 in Detroit as early as June 1965 and peaking at #4 in Chicago that August: the national peak of the single was #11 achieved on the Hot 100 in Billboard dated August 21, 1965. "Baby I'm Yours" afforded Lewis a #5 R&B chart hit.

== Charts ==
Chart (1965)	Peak position
US Billboard Hot 100	11
US Hot R&B/Hip-Hop Songs (Billboard)	5
Canada Top Singles (RPM)	7

== The Paramounts/ Peter and Gordon versions ==
"Baby I'm Yours"
- Side A of the Australian single

Single by Peter and Gordon

from the album Lady Godiva
- B-side: "When the Black of Your Eyes Turns to Grey"
- Released: 1965
- Recorded: 1965
- Venue: Abbey Road Studios
- Genre: Pop
- Length: 2:39
- Label: Columbia
- Songwriter: Van McCoy
- Producer: Norman Newell

Peter and Gordon singles chronology
"To Know You is to Love You" (1965)	"Baby I'm Yours" (1965)	"Woman" (1966)

A version by Peter and Gordon was released by Columbia UK in 1965. The track was also included on the duo's 1966 album, Lady Godiva.

=== Development ===
The first UK recording of "Baby I'm Yours" was by the Paramounts, at Abbey Road Studios in the summer of 1965, but the track went unreleased until their 1998 compilation album, The Paramounts at Abbey Road 1963 to 1970. A higher-profile act also on the Columbia [UK] roster, Peter and Gordon, had the UK hit version of the song, released 15 October 1965, which reached #19 on the UK singles chart. The Peter and Gordon version was recorded in an Abbey Road session produced by Norman Newell and featured Big Jim Sullivan on guitar. Peter Asher, who partnered Gordon Waller as Peter and Gordon, recalled: "We did 'Baby I'm Yours' because I loved the original Barbara Lewis record."

=== Commercial performance ===
"Baby I'm Yours" is unique among Peter and Gordon singles, being their sole collaboration with arranger Tony Osborne, who took over from the duo's original regular collaborator Geoff Love. Subsequent to "Baby I'm Yours" Peter and Gordon regularly collaborated with arranger/conductor Bob Leaper. In deference to the US success of the Barbara Lewis version, Capitol Records, Peter and Gordon's US label, did not issue the duo's "Baby I'm Yours" single in America. The US single release, concurrent with "Baby I'm Yours" in the UK, was "Don't Pity Me", a composition by the duo which peaked at #83. "Baby I'm Yours" was the first Peter and Gordon UK single not be released concurrently in the US.

=== Charts ===
Chart (1965)	Peak position
UK Singles (Official Charts)	19

== Jody Miller version ==
"Baby I'm Yours"

Single by Jody Miller

from the album He's So Fine
- B-side: "Good Lovin' (Makes It Right)"
- Released: September 1, 1971
- Recorded: June 16, 1971
- Genre: Countrypolitan
- Length: 3:09
- Label: Epic
- Songwriter: Van McCoy
- Producer: Billy Sherrill

Jody Miller singles chronology
"He's So Fine" (1971)	"Baby I'm Yours" (1971)	"Be My Baby" (1972)

Jody Miller recorded "Baby I'm Yours" with producer Billy Sherrill in a June 16, 1971 session at the Columbia studio in Nashville for inclusion on the album He's So Fine, entitled for Miller's then current top five country remake of the Chiffons' 1963 #1 hit.

=== Development ===
Miller's recording of "Baby I'm Yours" featured the Jordanaires chorale. Impressed by the 1968 Tammy Wynette hit "Stand by Your Man", Miller had contacted that track's producer Billy Sherrill in the hopes of reviving her own flagging recording career. After Look at Mine—Miller's first album in Sherrill's charge—generated two top twenty hits on the country chart in 1970 with "Look at Mine" and "If You Think I Love You Now (I've Just Started)", Sherrill opted for a new musical direction for Miller, who recalls: "He said I didn't phrase my words like a country singer, so we took some old, sexy pop songs and put in a little boppy steel guitar." Issued September 1, 1971 as the second single off He's So Fine, "Baby I'm Yours" reached #5 C&W and #21 Adult Contemporary and afforded Miller her fifth and final Hot 100 showing with a Hot 100 peak of #91.

=== Charts ===
Chart (1971)	Peak position
US Billboard Hot 100	91
US Hot Country Songs (Billboard)	5
US Adult Contemporary (Billboard)	21
Canada Adult Contemporary (RPM)	25
Canada Country Singles (RPM)	8

== Cass Elliot version ==
"Baby I'm Yours"
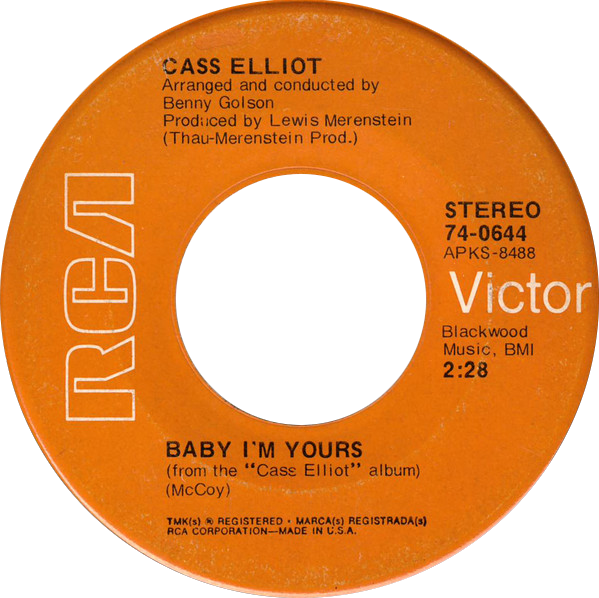
- Side A of the US single

Single by Cass Elliot

from the album Cass Elliot
- B-side: "Cherries Jubilee"
- Released: February 1972
- Recorded: 1971
- Genre: Pop
- Length: 2:28
- Label: RCA
- Songwriter: Van McCoy
- Producer: Lewis Merenstein

Cass Elliot singles chronology
"Too Much Truth, Too Much Love" (1971)	"Baby I'm Yours" (1972)	"That Song" (1972)

Audio
- "Baby I'm Yours" by Cass Elliot on YouTube

Cass Elliot's remake of "Baby I'm Yours" was released in February 1972 at the same time as its parent album Cass Elliot.

=== Development ===
Elliot's version was produced by Lewis Merenstein and arranged/conducted by Benny Golson. The album was Elliot's debut for RCA Victor who insisted on "Baby I'm Yours" release as the lead single over Elliott and Merenstein's choice: "That Song", a new song by Bill Dean, which would be given single release in April 1972. Neither "Baby I'm Yours" or "That Song" afforded Elliot an appearance on a Billboard chart. Elliot's "Baby I'm Yours" charted on the Canadian Adult Contemporary hitlist, peaking at #18.

=== Track list ===
CD single

1. "Baby I'm Yours"
2. "Cherries Jubilee"

=== Charts ===
Chart (1972)	Peak position
Canada Adult Contemporary (RPM)	18

== Linda Lewis version ==
"Baby I'm Yours"

Single by Linda Lewis
- B-side: "The Other Side"
- Released: March 19, 1976
- Genre: Disco
- Length: 3:37
- Label: Arista
- Songwriter: Van McCoy
- Producers: Bert DeCoteaux; Tony Silvester

Linda Lewis singles chronology
"Rock and Roller Coaster" (1975)	"Baby I'm Yours" (1976)	"This Time I'll Be Sweeter" (1976)

In May 1976, a disco remake of "Baby I'm Yours" was released by Linda Lewis, who in 1967 had chosen Lewis as her professional surname in honor of Barbara Lewis, the original singer of "Baby I'm Yours".

=== Development ===
Recorded subsequent to Lewis' 1975 album Not a Little Girl Anymore, and not included on her next album release Woman Overboard (1977), "Baby I'm Yours" was included as a bonus track on the 2001 CD release of Not a Little Girl Anymore. The song reached #33 in United Kingdom charts.

=== Track list ===
CD single

1. "Baby I'm Yours"
2. "The Other Side"

=== Charts ===
Chart	Peak position
UK Singles (Official Charts)	33

== Debby Boone version ==
"Baby I'm Yours"

Single by Debby Boone

from the album You Light Up My Life
- B-side: "God Knows"
- Released: May 1978
- Recorded: 1977
- Genre: Easy listening, Country
- Length: 3:09
- Label: Warner Bros.
- Songwriter: Van McCoy
- Producers: Michael Lloyd; Mike Curb

Debby Boone singles chronology
"California" (1978)	"Baby I'm Yours" / "God Knows" (1978)	"When You're Loved" (1978)

Debby Boone recorded "Baby I'm Yours" in the summer of 1977 with the track included on Boone's album You Light Up My Life.

=== Development ===
The song was issued as a single in March 1978 with "God Knows", a track from Boone's Midstream album, as its flip side. Peter Noone, the co-writer of "God Knows", has alleged "['God Knows'] was originally intended to be the A-side. But the record company chickened out and went with [the] cover of 'Baby I'm Yours' instead." Boone's "Baby I'm Yours" peaked at #22 C&W while on the Hot 100 the track peaked at #74 and on the Easy Listening chart it reached #14, both in a tandem ranking with "God Knows".

=== Track list ===
CD single

1. "Baby I'm Yours"
2. "God Knows"

=== Charts ===
Chart (1978)	Peak position
US Billboard Hot 100	74
US Adult Contemporary (Billboard)	18
US Hot Country Songs (Billboard)	22

== Tanya Tucker version ==
"Baby I'm Yours"

Single by Tanya Tucker

from the album Changes
- B-side: "I Don't Want You to Go"
- Released: July 1983
- Genre: Countrypolitan
- Length: 3:31
- Label: Arista
- Songwriter: Van McCoy
- Producer: David Malloy

Tanya Tucker singles chronology
"Changes" (1982)	"Baby I'm Yours" (1983)	"One Love at a Time" (1986)

Tanya Tucker recorded "Baby I'm Yours" for her sole Arista album release Changes, from which the song was issued as the third single in July 1983, peaking at C&W #22.

=== Track list ===
CD single 1

1. "Baby I'm Yours"
2. "I Don't Want You to Go"

CD single 2

1. "Baby I'm Yours"
2. "Baby I'm Yours" (Radio edit)
3. "Baby I'm Yours" (Remix)
4. "I Don't Want You to Go"

=== Charts ===
Chart (1983)	Peak position
US Hot Country Songs (Billboard)	22

== Cher version ==
"Baby I'm Yours"

Single by Cher

from the album Music From the Original Motion Picture Soundtrack - Mermaids
- B-side: "Hard Enough Getting Over You"
- Released: October 1990
- Recorded: 1990
- Genre: Pop rock
- Length: 3:19
- Label: Geffen
- Songwriter: Van McCoy
- Producer: Peter Asher

Cher singles chronology
"You Wouldn't Know Love" (1990)	"Baby I'm Yours" (1990)	"The Shoop Shoop Song (It's in His Kiss)" (1990)

=== Background ===
Cher remade "Baby I'm Yours" for the soundtrack of her 1990 film vehicle Mermaids. Cher's version was arranged to replicate Barbara Lewis' hit, and was produced by Peter Asher, who as a member of Peter and Gordon had had the UK hit of "Baby I'm Yours". Despite not being featured in the film, "Baby I'm Yours" was chosen as the lead single from the soundtrack in Europe. It charted for one week in the UK at number 89. "The Shoop Shoop Song (It's in His Kiss)" was released in the spring of 1991 with "Baby I'm Yours" as the B-side, and spent five weeks at #1 in the UK and achieved Top Ten status in several European countries as well as Australia and New Zealand. (Coincidentally the precedent charting single to the Linda Lewis 1976 UK hit remake of "Baby I'm Yours" had been the first major UK hit version of "The Shoop Shoop Song", entitled "It's in His Kiss".)

=== Track listing ===
- European 7" and cassette single
1. "Baby I'm Yours" – 3:16
2. "Hard Enough Getting Over You" – 3:46
- European 12" and CD single
1. "Baby I'm Yours" – 3:16
2. "Hard Enough Getting Over You" – 3:46
3. "Just Like Jesse James" – 4:06

=== Charts ===
Chart (1990–91)	Peak position
Australia (ARIA Charts)	146
UK Singles (Official Charts)	89

== Other versions ==
- B-side of Arctic Monkeys' 2006 UK hit "Leave Before the Lights Come On" (#4); that version featured the 747s with shared vocals by Arctic Monkeys' lead singer Alex Turner and the 747s' lead singer Oisin Leech.
- The song's composer Van McCoy produced a recording of the song by Chris Bartley, which was a non-charting 1968 single release.
- Cilla Black on the album Cilla Sings a Rainbow (1966)
- Petula Clark on the album Now (1972)
- Donny Gerrard on the album The Romantic (1999)
- Susan Jacks on the album Forever (1982)
- Jack Jones on the album For the "In" Crowd (1966)
- The Jones Girls on the album On Target (1983)
- June Lodge on the album Someone Loves You Honey (1980)
- KC and the Sunshine Band on the album The Painter (1981)
- Diane Marino featuring Houston Person on the album Just Groovin' (2008)
- Maureen McGovern on the album Baby I'm Yours (1992)
- Nilsson in a medley with "Just One Look", a duet with Lynda Laurence, on the album ...That's the Way It Is (1976)
- Phoebe Snow and Avenue Blue featuring Jeff Golub on the album Naked City (1996)
- Dianne Steinberg on the album Universal Child (1977)
- Bobby Vee in a medley with "Make It Easy on Yourself", on the album 30 Big Hits of the '60's, Vol. 2 (1966)
- Bobby Vinton on the album My Elusive Dreams (1970)
- Kim Weston on the album It Should Have Been Me (1998)
- Rita Wilson on the album Every Mother Counts 2012 (2012)
- A French-language rendering of "Baby I'm Yours" entitled "Je T'appartiens" was a 1965 single release by Pierre Lalonde and was included on Lalonde's 1966 album release Louise. (This is an exceptional use of the title "Je T'appartiens" which is generally understood to refer to the French-language original of "Let It Be Me".)
- In the 1999 film The Other Sister, "Baby I'm Yours" is performed at an engagement party by a cappella group Double Dare featuring Mary Lou Metzger.
- In the 2003 episode of the NBC-TV series American Dreams entitled "And Promises to Keep", Barbara Lewis portrayed by Vanessa Soul is seen rehearsing "Baby I'm Yours" for an American Bandstand performance.
- In the 2009 film Last Chance Harvey, "Baby I'm Yours" is apparently performed live at a wedding reception, although the track was in fact recorded by a session group credited as Loser's Lounge, none of whose members appear in the film; the track was produced and arranged by Joe McGinty, heard on piano, while the vocalist is Connie Petruk.
- In "Grad Night", the 13th episode of the 3rd season of the CBC original series Schitt's Creek in 2017, Moira Rose (Catherine O'Hara) sings this song with her choir to her daughter Alexis Rose (Annie Murphy) on Alexis' graduation day.

== Popular culture ==
- The song was featured in the 1995 film The Bridges of Madison County and was included on the soundtrack album.
- It was also featured in the TV movies The Midnight Hour (1985) and An American Crime (2007), as well as being briefly featured in the film Baby Driver (2017) and included on its soundtrack.
- The song was performed by character Moira Rose and her “Jazzagals” in the finale of season 3 of the TV show Schitt’s Creek.
