= He's So Fine =

1963 single by The Chiffons

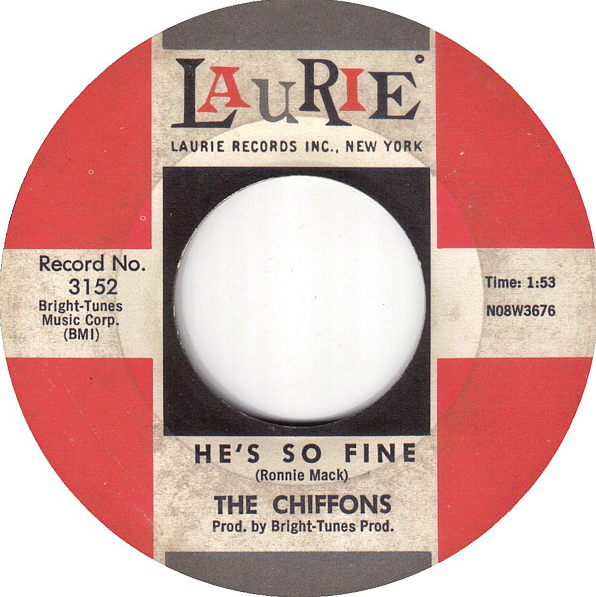

Single by the Chiffons

from the album He's So Fine
- B-side: "Oh My Lover"
- Released: January 1963
- Recorded: December 1962
- Genre: Pop
- Length: 1:53
- Label: Laurie Records
- Songwriter: Ronald Mack
- Producers: Phil Margo, Mitch Margo, Jay Siegal, and Hank Medress

The Chiffons singles chronology
"He's So Fine" (1963)	"Lucky Me" (1963)

"He's So Fine" is a song written by Ronnie Mack. It was recorded by the Chiffons who topped the Billboard Hot 100 for four weeks in the spring of 1963, recognized by its doo-lang doo-lang doo-lang background vocal. "He's So Fine" is also known as the song which George Harrison was accused of copying in the plagiarism case against his "My Sweet Lord".

Country music singer Jody Miller scored a top-ten hit of her own in 1971 with her cover of "He's So Fine".

== The Chiffons version ==
=== Background ===
"He's So Fine" was written by Ronald Mack, an acquaintance of the Chiffons' members who set himself up as their manager after overhearing them harmonise in their high school's lunch room. Mack elicited the interest of Bright Tunes Corporation, a production company run by the Tokens, who produced the Chiffons singing "He's So Fine", and two other Mack compositions at Capitol Recording Studios (New York, 165 W. 46th St.).

The Tokens themselves – who had never previously played on a recording session – provided the instrumentation, with the services of drummer Gary Chester.

Originally one of the two other songs, "Oh, My Lover", was considered the potential hit. But the completed track for "He's So Fine" with its now-classic "Doo-lang doo-lang doo-lang" background vocal – the suggestion of the session's sound engineer Johnny Cue – seemed an obvious smash. However, Capitol Records, for whom the Tokens were house producers, rejected the track: Jay Siegal of the Tokens recalled Capitol's president Voyle Gilmore dismissing the track as "too trite ... too simple". The Tokens shopped "He's So Fine" to ten labels before placing it with Laurie Records. According to Siegal, "We played it, and they locked the doors and said 'You're not getting out of here. We want that record.' ... Of course we'd already been turned down by ten companies. Give us eighty cents and we'd have given you the record."

The Chiffons' two later Top 10 hits both contain echoes of "He's So Fine", although neither song was written by Ronald Mack, who died soon after the Chiffons had recorded his song. "One Fine Day" was written by Carole King and Gerry Goffin, and "Sweet Talking Guy" – in which the background vocalists sing "he's so fine" – was co-written by Eliot Greenberg, the co-founder of Laurie Records.

"He's So Fine" by The Chiffons is also featured on the soundtrack album of the 1979 film Quadrophenia by the English band The Who.

=== Reception ===
Released in early 1963, "He's So Fine" entered the national charts in February 1963 attaining the No. 1 position on March 30 and remaining No. 1 for a four-week period. It also made it to No. 1 on the soul singles chart. Billboard ranked the record as the No. 5 song of 1963. "He's So Fine" was also a No. 16 hit in the UK. Billboard ranked the song at No. 73 on its list of 100 Greatest Girl Group Songs of All Time.

=== Charts ===
Chart performance for "He's So Fine"
Chart (1963)	Peak position
Canada (CHUM)	1
New Zealand (Lever Hit Parade)	1
UK Singles (The Official Charts Company)	16
US Billboard Hot 100	1
US Hot R&B Singles (Billboard)	1
US Music Vendor Top 100 Pop	1

=== "My Sweet Lord" plagiarism lawsuit ===
On February 10, 1971, Bright Tunes Music Corporation filed suit alleging that George Harrison had plagiarised "He's So Fine" in his then-current hit "My Sweet Lord". The case did not go to trial until February 1976, after which the judge ruled in favor of Bright Tunes on the liability portion of the suit, determining that Harrison had committed "subconscious" plagiarism.

The suit to determine damages was scheduled for November 1976 but delayed until February 1981, by which time Allen Klein, Harrison's one-time manager, who had been his legal adviser in the first phase of the suit, had become the plaintiff by virtue of purchasing Bright Tunes. The final decision was that Harrison would purchase Bright Tunes from Klein for $587,000 – the amount Klein had paid for the corporation – and although litigation continued for at least ten more years, that decision was upheld. In 1975, the Chiffons recorded a version of "My Sweet Lord", attempting to capitalize on the publicity generated by the lawsuit. In 1976, Harrison released "This Song" in reaction to the plagiarism suit.

== Jody Miller version ==
"He's So Fine"

Single by Jody Miller

from the album He's So Fine
- B-side: "You Number Two"
- Released: May 12, 1971
- Recorded: February 17, 1971
- Genre: Countrypolitan
- Length: 2:35
- Label: Epic Records
- Songwriter: Ronald Mack
- Producer: Billy Sherrill

Jody Miller singles chronology
"If You Think I Love You Now (I've Just Started)" (1970)	"He's So Fine" (1971)	"Baby I'm Yours" (1971)

=== Background ===
Jody Miller had a Top Ten C&W hit with her remake of "He's So Fine" recorded in a February 17, 1971 session at the Columbia studio in Nashville and issued May 12, 1971 as the advance single from Miller's He's So Fine album, that album—released August 1971—being Miller's second full-length collaboration with producer Billy Sherrill. Miller's remake omits the original's 'doo lang' background vocal. Besides the title cut, the He's So Fine album featured Miller's remake of the 1965 Barbara Lewis hit "Baby I'm Yours": Miller's third Sherrill-produced album There's a Party Going On afforded Miller C&W hit remakes of The Ronettes' "Be My Baby" and The Teddy Bears' "To Know Him is to Love Him".

Impressed by the 1968 Tammy Wynette hit "Stand by Your Man", Miller had contacted that track's producer Billy Sherrill in the hopes of reviving her own flagging recording career and after Look at Mine, Miller's first album in Sherrill's charge, generated two Top Twenty C&W hits in 1970, Sherrill opted for a new musical direction for Miller who recalls: "He said I didn't phrase my words like a country singer, so we took some old, sexy pop songs and put in a little boppy steel guitar".

=== Reception ===
Miller's cover version of "He's So Fine" peaked at No. 5 C&W in July 1971, and crossed over to the Pop charts and also Easy Listening charts with July 1971 peaks of No. 53 Pop and No. 2 Easy Listening, the latter stat representing Miller's alltime best chart showing. The song also peaked at No. 28 in Australia. "He's So Fine" also afforded Miller a Top Ten C&W hit in Canada, with a No. 3 peak, also reaching No. 1 on the Adult Contemporary chart for Canada and crossing over to No. 46 on the Canadian Pop chart.

== 1978: Jane Olivor / Kristy McNichol remakes ==
In the spring of 1978 two disparate remakes of "He's So Fine" were released as singles with both singles eventually ranking on the Billboard Hot 100. Jane Olivor recorded the song as a ballad for her album Stay the Night, producer Jason Darrow having wanted a "lighter song" for the album: Olivor had been initially unmoved by Darrow's endorsement of a slow version of "He's So Fine" – whose lyrics Olivor found vapid – but the singer saw the validity of her producer's suggestion after Darrow played Olivor the Chiffons' 45 rpm single at 33 1/3 rpm. Released as a single in April 1978, "He's So Fine" debuted on the Hot 100 dated 20 May 1978, becoming the second of Olivor's two Hot 100 entries and with its eventual peak of No. 77 becoming the more successful, as Olivor's precedent Hot 100 single "Some Enchanted Evening" had peaked at No. 91 in 1976. (Olivor would "bubble under the Hot 100" chart in 1980 when her single "Don't Let Go of Me" peaked at No. 108.) "He's So Fine" would also afford Olivor her sole ranking on the Billboard Easy Listening chart, where its peak would be No. 21, also ranking in the Canadian singles chart with a No. 71 peak and rising as high as No. 3 on the Canadian Easy Listening chart.

May 1978 saw the release of an attempted replication of the original "He's So Fine" credited to Kristy and Jimmy McNichol although the track only featured the former, being credited to the duo to reflect its parent Kristy and Jimmy McNichol album, which was produced by Philip Margo and Mitch Margo, who – as members of the Tokens – had produced the Chiffons' original: three members of the Chiffons – Patricia Bennett, Barbara Lee, and Sylvia Peterson – sang back-up on the McNichol remake of "He's So Fine". Both the McNichol version of "He's So Fine" and that by Jane Olivor appeared in the Record World ranking of the singles at positions No. 101 to No. 150 as early as the chart dated 20 May 1978, although the McNichol take would not debut on the Record World ranking of the top 100 singles until that dated 5 August 1978, two weeks subsequent to the track's debut on the Billboard Hot 100 dated 22 July 1978 (one week after the final Hot 100 appearance of the Jane Olivor take, whose Hot 100 tenure ended as of the chart dated 15 July 1978): on the Cash Box Top 100 the McNichol "He's So Fine" made its debut on the chart dated 30 July 1978. The McNichol "He's So Fine" peaked at No. 70 on the Hot 100. (The chart fortunes of both the Olivor and McNichol takes on "He's So Fine" varied widely, according to which of the three music trade periodicals is cited: Record World affords a peak of No. 87 to both the Oliver and McNichol versions, while according to Cash Box, the Olivor take peaked at No. 67, McNicol's at No. 83.)
