= Queen of the House =

Single by Jody Miller

from the album Queen of the House
- B-side: "The Greatest Actor"
- Released: April 1965
- Recorded: March 1965
- Studio: Capitol Studios
- Genre: Country pop
- Length: 2:18
- Label: Capitol
- Songwriters: Roger Miller; Mary Taylor
- Producer: Steve Douglas

Jody Miller singles chronology
"Never Let Him Go" (1965)	"Queen of the House" (1965)	"Silver Threads and Golden Needles" (1965)

"Queen of the House" is a song originally recorded and made commercially successful by American singer Jody Miller. It was an answer song to Roger Miller's (no relation) "King of the Road". It featured lyrics written by Mary Taylor, with credit also given to Roger Miller. The song describes the day-to-day domestic duties of a housewife. It was released as a single on the coattails of "King of the Road"'s success, becoming a crossover single on the country, pop and adult contemporary charts. It led to Miller becoming the second female artist to win a country music Grammy award. An album of the same name appeared in 1965, which also featured the single.

== Background and composition ==
In 1965, Roger Miller recorded his self-penned song called "King of the Road". It described the lifestyle of a hobo and it became a number one country song and top five pop song. It would become one of his signature tunes and would be recorded by many other artists. In its wake would come an answer song called "Queen of the House". Answer songs were songs written in reply (or response) to another song made popular by another artist.

"Queen of the House" described a housewife's domestic duties, including taking care of four children, dirty floors and bathtubs. Mary Taylor was a singer–songwriter signed to Capitol Records at the time. After hearing "King of the Road", she composed "Queen of the House". A friend of Roger Miller's, Taylor called Miller on the phone after composing it. Miller insisted that she cut the song herself, but she was unable to because she already had a single out on the national charts.

== Recording ==
Mary Taylor's producer brought the song to the attention of Jody Miller's producer, Steve Douglas. Douglas had not achieved much production success and was encouraged to cut the track with Jody Miller (no relation to Roger Miller). Up to that point, Jody Miller had been a folk artist at the Capitol label. She had one single make the American pop charts called "He Walks Like a Man". However, it was only a minor success and she had yet to achieve stardom. At first, Jody Miller did not believe the song was right for her. Its characteristic finger snaps evoked the jazz style of singer Peggy Lee (who was also at Capitol). However, she eventually succumbed to recording the song. "Queen of the House" was recorded by Miller at Capitol Studios in Hollywood, California. The session was held in March 1965, with Steve Douglas producing the track.

== Release and chart performance ==
"Queen of the House" was released as a seven-inch vinyl single by Capitol Records in April 1965. The North American version included "The Greatest Actor" on its B-side". Equal credit was given to Roger Miller and Mary Taylor for the song's composition. According to Jody Miller, "Queen of the House" received "instant airplay" from radio stations and the record could not be made "fast enough". The song climbed to the number 12 position on the American Billboard Hot 100 chart, her highest peak on that chart in her career. It became her first single to make the Billboard Hot Country Songs chart, climbing to the number five position there. It also reached number four on the Billboard adult contemporary charts. The single was included on Miller's second studio album which was also titled Queen of the House.

The country crossover success of "Queen of the House" led to a new career path for Miller. She would end up recording as a country artist as the decade progressed, having success at Epic Records in the 1970s with several more popular country songs. Miller's recording led to her winning for Best Female Country Vocal Performance at the 8th Annual Grammy Awards in 1966. The same night, Roger Miller took home five Grammy awards, including two for "King of the Road".

== Track listing ==
7" vinyl single (North America)

- "Queen of the House" – 2:18
- "The Greatest Actor" – 2:30

7" vinyl single (Greece)

- "Queen of the House" – 2:18
- "Home of the Brave" – 2:50

== Charts ==
=== Weekly charts ===
Weekly chart performance for "Queen of the House"
Chart (1965)	Peak position
Australia (Kent Music Report)	68
US Adult Contemporary (Billboard)	4
US Billboard Hot 100	12
US Hot Country Songs (Billboard)	5

== Accolades ==
Year	Nominee / work	Award	Result	Ref.
1966	8th Annual Grammy Awards	Best Country Vocal Performance, Female	Won	
