= Debby Boone discography =

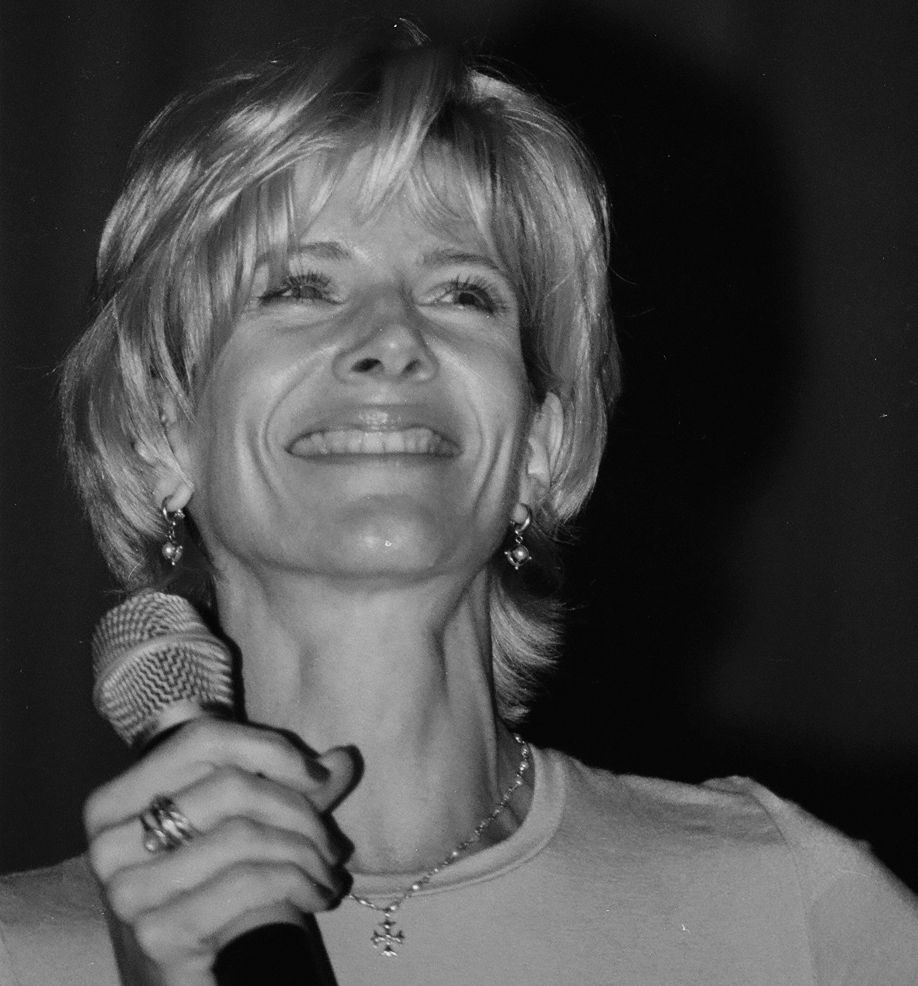
- Boone in Washington, D.C. in 1997
- Studio albums: 13
- Compilation albums: 5
- Singles: 16
- Promotional singles: 8
- Other charted songs: 1
- Other album appearances: 14

The discography of American singer, Debby Boone, contains 13 studio albums, five compilation albums, 20 singles, eight promotional singles, one other charted song and 14 other album appearances. Boone's 1977 debut single, "You Light Up My Life" reached number one on multiple charts: The US Hot 100, the US adult contemporary chart, the Canadian RPM top singles chart and the Canadian RPM adult contemporary chart. Boone's debut album of the same name reached number six on the US Billboard 200, number one on the Canadian RPM Top Albums chart and certified platinum in sales in the US. Four more songs made lower positions in the United States and Canada including the top 20 adult contemporary singles, "California" and "Baby I'm Yours". Both were included on her second studio album, Midstream (1978).

In 1979, Boone's eponymous third studio album was released which produced the top 20 US and Canadian country single, "My Heart Has a Mind of Its Own". It was followed in 1980 by her fourth album, Love Has No Reason, which reached number 17 on the US Top Country Albums chart. The LP also included "Are You on the Road to Lovin' Me Again", which reached number one on the US Hot Country Songs chart. It was followed by the top 20 US country song, "Free to Be Lonely Again". During this period, Boone issued the studio album, With My Song, her first LP to reach the US Top Christian Albums chart. Four more studio albums were issued during the 1980s that made the US Christian Albums chart including three that reached the top ten: Surrender (1983), Choose Life (1985) and Friends for Life.

Following her 1989 Christmas album, Home for Christmas, Boone did not release another studio album until 2005's Reflections of Rosemary. It was followed eight years later by the 2013 album, Swing This. In the 2020s, Boone was featured on singles by various recording artists including Claire Holley's 2021 recording of "Blue Skies", Derek Anthony Gray's 2022 song "You You" and Lindy Boone's 2024 recording of "Wordlayer".

== Albums ==
=== Studio albums ===
List of studio albums, with selected chart positions and certifications, showing other relevant details
Title	Album details	Peak chart positions					Certifications
Title	Album details	US	US Chr.	US Cou.	AUS	CAN	Certifications
You Light Up My Life	Released: August 1977; Label: Warner Bros./Curb; Formats: LP, cassette	6	—	6	73	1	RIAA: Platinum
Midstream	Released: July 1978; Label: Warner Bros./Curb; Formats: LP, cassette	147	—	—	—	—	
Debby Boone	Released: August 1979; Label: Warner Bros./Curb; Formats: LP, cassette	—	—	—	—	—	
Love Has No Reason	Released: March 1980; Label: Warner Bros./Curb; Formats: LP, cassette	—	—	17	—	—	
With My Song	Released: 1980; Label: Lamb & Lion; Formats: LP, cassette	—	9	—	—	—	
Savin' It Up	Released: December 1980; Label: Warner Bros./Curb; Formats: LP, cassette	—	—	49	—	—	
Surrender	Released: 1983; Label: Lamb & Lion; Formats: LP, CD, cassette	—	7	—	—	—	
Choose Life	Released: 1985; Label: Lamb & Lion; Formats: LP, CD, cassette	—	7	—	—	—	
Friends for Life	Released: 1987; Label: Lamb & Lion; Formats: LP, CD, cassette	—	4	—	—	—	
Be Thou My Vision	Released: 1989; Label: Lamb & Lion; Formats: LP, CD, cassette	—	23	—	—	—	
Home for Christmas	Released: 1989; Label: Lamb & Lion; Formats: LP, CD, cassette	—	—	—	—	—	
Reflections of Rosemary	Released: April 26. 2005; Label: Concord; Formats: CD	—	—	—	—	—	
Swing This	Released: December 10, 2013; Label: The Gold Label; Formats: CD, digital	—	—	—	—	—	
"—" denotes a recording that did not chart or was not released in that territory.

=== Compilation albums ===
List of compilation albums, with selected chart positions, showing other relevant details
Title	Album details	Peak chart positions
Title	Album details	US Christian
Greatest Hits	Released: 1981; Label: Lamb & Lion; Formats: LP	—
The Best of Debby Boone	Released: 1986; Label: Curb/MCA; Formats: LP, CD, cassette	—
Love Put a Song in My Heart	Released: 1988; Label: Curb/MCA; Formats: Cassette	—
Reflections	Released: 1989; Label: Lamb & Lion; Formats: LP, CD, cassette	33
You Light Up My Life: Great Inspirational Songs	Released: 2001; Label: Curb; Formats: CD	—
"—" denotes a recording that did not chart or was not released in that territory.

== Singles ==
=== As lead and collaborative artist ===
List of lead and collaborative singles, with selected chart positions and certifications, showing other relevant details
Title	Year	Peak chart positions									Certifications	Album
Title	Year	US	US AC	US Cou.	AUS	CAN	CAN AC	CAN Cou.	NZ	UK	Certifications	Album
"You Light Up My Life"	1977	1	1	4	7	1	1	6	12	48	RIAA: Platinum	You Light Up My Life
"California"	1978	50	20	—	—	60	21	—	—	—		Midstream
"Baby I'm Yours"	1978	74	18	33	—	—	—	—	—	—		You Light Up My Life
"When You're Loved"	1978	—	48	—	—	—	—	—	—	—		Midstream
"In Memory of Your Love"	1978	—	—	61	—	—	—	—	—	—		non-album single
"My Heart Has a Mind of Its Own"	1979	—	—	11	—	—	—	20	—	—		Debby Boone
"Breakin' in a Brand New Broken Heart"	1979	—	—	25	—	—	—	28	—	—		Debby Boone
"See You in September"	1979	—	45	41	—	—	—	45	—	—		non-album singles
"Everybody's Somebody's Fool"	1979	—	—	48	—	—	—	—	—	—		non-album singles
"Are You on the Road to Lovin' Me Again"	1980	—	31	1	—	—	—	20	—	—		Love Has No Reason
"Free to Be Lonely Again"	1980	—	—	14	—	—	—	—	—	—		Love Has No Reason
"Take It Like a Woman"	1980	—	—	44	—	—	—	—	—	—		Love Has No Reason
"Perfect Fool"	1981	—	37	23	—	—	—	20	—	—		Savin' It Up
"It'll Be Him"	1981	—	—	46	—	—	—	—	—	—		Savin' It Up
"Snow" (with John Driskell Hopkins and Yacht Rock Revue)	2022	—	—	—	—	—	—	—	—	—		non-album single
"—" denotes a recording that did not chart or was not released in that territory.

=== As a featured artist ===
List of featured singles, showing all relevant details
Title	Year	Album	Ref.
"Blue Skies" (with Claire Holley featuring Debby Boone)	2021	non-album singles	
"You You" (Derek Anthony Gray featuring Debby Boone)	2022	non-album singles	
"Blowing Pines" (Claire Holley featuring Debby Boone)	2022	non-album singles	
"Christmas Day" (Ginger & the Glowsticks featuring Debby Boone)	2023	non-album singles	
"Wordlayer" (Lindy Boone featuring Cherry Boone, Debby Boone and Laury Boone)	2024	non-album singles	

=== Promotional singles ===
List of promotional singles, showing all relevant details
Title	Year	Album	Ref.
"Help Me Understand" (with Pat Boone)	1973	non-album single	
"Lord I Believe"	1980	With My Song	
"Keep the Flame Burning" (with Phil Driscoll)	1983	Surrender	
"Choose Life"	1985	Choose Life	
"The Time Is Now"	1985	Choose Life	
"The Name Above All Names"	1987	Friends for Life	
"A Little Broken Road"	1987	Friends for Life	
"Masihlanganeni"	1987	Friends for Life	

== Other charted songs ==
List of songs, with selected chart positions, showing other relevant details
Title	Year	Peak chart positions					Album	Notes
Title	Year	US	US AC	US Cou.	AUS	CAN	Album	Notes
"God Knows"	1978	74	14	22	86	98	Midstream	(Note: B-side to the single "Baby, I'm Yours".)

== Other album appearances/credits ==
- 1978: The Magic Of Lassie – various artists; "Brass Rings & Day Dreams", "There'll Be Other Friday Nights", "When You're Loved"
- 1979: On This Christmas Night – various artists; "The Gift Of Love"
- 1980: Cranston Thorndike & The Dragon – various artists; voice of Cranston's Mother, music/lyrics co-writer
- 1982: Good Night, Sleep Tight – various artists; "I Thank the Father"
- 1983: Solo – Steve Archer; "Evermore" (duet)
- 1989: Bowling in Paris – Stephen Bishop; background vocals
- 1995: Sing Me To Sleep, Mommy – various artists; "Sleep My Child"
- 1996: The Holiday Collection: Volume 1 – various artists; "The Gift Of Life"
- 1996: A Hollywood Christmas – various artists; "White Christmas"
- 1997: Cole Porter: A Musical Toast – various artists; "Do I Love You?"
- 1998: My Dream Come True – Ryan DeHeus; "Someone To Watch Over Me"
- 2000: Shake Those Hula Hips – Big Kahuna and the Copa Cat Pack; "Little Grass Shack", "Princess Poo-poo-ly Has Plenty Papaya"
- 2008: The Real Me – John Sawyer; "I'm Always On Your Side"
- 2012: Christmas Around the World with Perry Como; featured guest
