= The Best of Debby Boone =

Compilation album by Debby Boone
- Released: 1986
- Length: 29:36
- Label: Curb
- Producer: Brooks Arthur, Joe Brooks, Mike Curb, Michael Lloyd

Debby Boone chronology
Choose Life (1985)	The Best of Debby Boone (1986)	Friends for Life (1987)

Professional ratings
Review scores
Source	Rating
AllMusic	4/5 stars

The Best of Debby Boone (1986) is the first compilation album for Debby Boone, collecting ten tracks from her five secular studio albums released by Curb Records from 1977 to 1981.

== Track listing ==
1. "You Light Up My Life" (Joe Brooks) [3:35]
  - From You Light Up My Life
  - No. 1 (Hot 100), No. 4 (Country), No. 1 (AC)
2. "Everybody's Somebody's Fool" (Howard Greenfield, Jack Keller) [2:22]
  - 1979 single - first album release
  - No. 48 (Country)
3. "Baby I'm Yours" (Van McCoy) [2:36]
  - From You Light Up My Life
  - Flip (Hot 100), No. 33 (Country), No. 18 (AC)
4. "God Knows" (Franne Golde, Peter Noone, Allee Willis) [3:25]
  - From Midstream
  - No. 74 (Hot 100), No. 22 (Country), No. 14 (AC)
5. "When You're Loved" (Richard M. Sherman, Robert B. Sherman) [3:26]
  - From Midstream
  - No. 48 (AC)
6. "Are You on the Road to Lovin' Me Again" (Debbie Hupp, Bob Morrison) [2:30]
  - From Love Has No Reason
  - No. 1 (Country), No. 31 (AC)
7. "My Heart Has a Mind of Its Own" (Howard Greenfield, Jack Keller) [2:24]
  - From Debby Boone
  - No. 11 (Country)
8. "Free to Be Lonely Again" (Diane Pfeifer) [2:46]
  - From Love Has No Reason
  - No. 14 (Country)
9. "Perfect Fool" (Diane Pfeifer) [2:17]
  - From Savin' It Up
  - No. 23 (Country), No. 37 (AC)
10. "I'll Never Say 'Goodbye'" (Theme From The Universal Picture The Promise) (Alan Bergman, Marilyn Bergman, David Shire) [4:15]
  - From Debby Boone

== Production credits ==
Art direction

- Katherine DeVault
- Simon Levy

Mastering

- Steve Hall

Co-ordination

- Marguerite Luciani
