= Reflections (Debby Boone album) =

Compilation album by Debby Boone
- Released: 1989
- Genre: Christian
- Label: Lamb & Lion

Debby Boone chronology
Be Thou My Vision (1989)	Reflections (1989)	Home for Christmas (1989)

Reflections is a retrospective by Debby Boone that collects songs from the four Christian music albums she recorded in the 1980s, released in 1989.

While this was a compilation album, it still charted at #33 on the Top Contemporary Christian charts.

The album was available in LP, CD and cassette formats via Lamb & Lion Records.

== Track listing ==
1. "Sweet Adoration"
  - (from the 1980 album With My Song)
2. "Morningstar"
  - (from the 1980 album With My Song)
3. "Can You Reach My Friend"
  - (from the 1983 album Surrender)
4. "O Holy One"
  - (from the 1983 album Surrender)
5. "Keep the Flame Burning"
  - (from the 1983 album Surrender)
6. "Baruch Hashem Adonai"
7. "Surrender"
  - (from the 1983 album Surrender)
8. "The Heart of the Matter"
  - (from the 1985 album Choose Life)
9. "When I Accepted You"
  - (from the 1985 album Choose Life)
10. "To Every Generation"
  - (from the 1987 album Friends for Life)
11. "Sincerely Yours"
  - (from the 1987 album Friends for Life)
