= Be Thou My Vision (album) =

Studio album by Debby Boone
- Released: 1989
- Label: Benson

Debby Boone chronology
Love Put a Song in My Heart (1988)	Be Thou My Vision (1989)	Reflections (1989)

Be Thou My Vision is a 1989 album by Debby Boone. It was her last studio album, apart from Home for Christmas the same year, until Reflections of Rosemary in 2005.

In the US, the album peaked at #23 on the Top Contemporary Christian albums chart.

== Track listing ==
1. "All Creatures of Our God and King"
2. "The Lord Is In His Holy Temple/Holy, Holy, Holy"
3. "O Sacred Head, Now Wounded"
4. "Let Us Break Bread Together"
5. "Joyful, Joyful, We Adore Thee"
6. "I Will Sing of My Redeemer"
7. "The Lord's Prayer"
8. "It Is Well With My Soul"
9. "Crown Him with Many Crowns/Christ the Lord Is Risen Today"
10. "Be Thou My Vision"

== Rereleases ==
In 2000, Curb re-released this record as Greatest Hymns. Amazon sells the MP3s for the album under the new name and notes that the old album is "discontinued".
