= Supercarrier (TV series) =

American military drama television series

- Genre: Military drama
- Created by: Stanford Whitmore
- Based on: Supercarrier by George C. Wilson
- Developed by: Steven E. de Souza
- Written by: Steven E. de Souza; Stanford Whitmore; Joel Wilf; Michael Part
- Directed by: William A. Graham; Corey Allen; Jackie Cooper; Peter Crane
- Theme music composer: Craig Safan; Mark Mueller
- Opening theme: "Living on the Edge"
- Composers: Jack Eskew (pilot ep.); Craig Safan
- Country of origin: United States
- Original language: English
- No. of seasons: 1
- No. of episodes: 8

Production
- Executive producer: Steven E. deSouza
- Producer: Chuck Bowman
- Cinematography: Jack Beckett; Robert Steadman; Frank Raymond
- Editors: Ronald J. Fagan; Gregory F. Plotts; Noel Rogers
- Running time: 60 minutes
- Production companies: Richard Maynard Productions; Real Tinsel Productions; Fries Entertainment

Original release
- Network: ABC
- Release: March 6 – May 14, 1988

Supercarrier is an American military drama television series that aired on ABC from March 6 until May 14, 1988. It features US Navy Pilots aboard the fictional aircraft carrier USS Georgetown. It suffered from low ratings against CBS's Murder, She Wrote and NBC's Family Ties also Day by Day, and lasted only eight episodes before being cancelled.

== Cast ==
- Robert Hooks as Capt. Jim Coleman
- Ken Olandt as Lt Jack "Sierra" DePalma
- Paul Gleason (pilot episode)
- Cec Verrell as Lt Ruth "Bee-Bee" Ruthkowski
- John David Bland as Lt Doyle "ANZAC" Sampson
- Gerardo Mejía as Master-at-Arms 3rd Class Luis Cruz
- Michael Sharrett (pilot episode)
- Matthew Walker as Seaman Raymond Lafitte
- Tasia Valenza (pilot episode)
- Wendie Malick (pilot episode)
- Denise Nicholas (pilot episode)
- Scott Kraft (pilot episode)
- Craig Stevens (pilot episode)
- Thomas Beck (pilot episode)
- Alex Hyde-White as Lt Dave "Hat Trick" Rawley
- Dale Dye as Capt Henry K. "Hank" Madigan
- Richard Jaeckel as Master Chief Sam Rivers
- Dennis R. "Beau" Sumner, Jr.
- Matthew Williams
- Peter Mark Richman (2nd episode)
- William Smith (3rd episode)
- Ismael 'East' Carlo (5th episode)
- Gina Gallego (5th episode)
- Harley Jane Kozak (5th episode)
- Jennifer Darling (6th episode)
- Lyman Ward (7th episode)
- Lawrence Kopp as Deadly Enemies (Pilot)

== Production ==
The series was partly filmed on board the USS Vandegrift (FFG-48), which is an Oliver Hazard Perry-class frigate rather than an aircraft carrier. Part of the filming was conducted on the USS John F. Kennedy (CV-67), between September and November 1987, while the ship was undergoing a period of upkeep.

The Department of the Navy pulled its support for the show in March 1988, with a spokesperson citing dissatisfaction with the plots of upcoming episodes in which the carrier "just becomes a backdrop" for stories unrelated to the U.S. Navy. The producer, Charles Fries, said in response that the Navy "wanted a sleepy show about life on a Supercarrier" and that he was "happy to be relieved of the cooperation because naval personnel were stifling our writers' relationships and dialogue".

== Episodes ==
No.	Title	Directed by	Written by	Original release date
1	"Deadly Enemies"	William A. Graham	Teleplay by : Stanford Whitmore & Steven E. de Souza	March 6, 1988
In the series pilot, the search for a downed jet fighter focuses attention on a hot-dogging flyer (Alex Hyde-White) and brings on the arrival of female forces.
2	"All in the Game"	Jackie Cooper	Joel M. Wilf	March 13, 1988
War games bring out the best and the worst: Rosie becomes an unlikely heroine, while tension escalates between pilots BeeBee and Sierra.
3	"Common Ground"	Unknown	Unknown	March 20, 1988
Anzac and Sierra get an unexpectedly friendly salute from a defecting Soviet pilot, flying a high-tech MiG 28 stealth fighter plane that both sides are after.
4	"Ring of Fire"	Peter Crane	Michael Part	March 27, 1988
Family duties may upset Sierra, and sink Cruz's Navy and boxing careers as he battles to keep his sister out of the gangs.
5	"Rest and Revolution"	Peter Crane	Jim Trombetta	April 10, 1988
BeeBee, Sierra and Anzac are staying in a small Latin nation of Val Verde training its fighter pilots, and while they're on liberty, the revolution starts without them.
6	"Give Me Liberty..."	Harry Harris	Jeri Barchilon & Michele Gendelman	April 17, 1988
Anzac and Sierra hook up with attractive but deadly arms dealers; Rivers tangles with a lawyer; Coleman's wife undergoes surgery for a lump in her breast.
7	"Exodus"	Corey Allen	Paul Aratow	April 24, 1988
Madigan evacuates China Sea villagers from impending war; and Willoughby befriends a pregnant refugee.
8	"Vector"	Chuck Bowman	Story by : George Lee Marshall; Teleplay by : George Lee Marshall; From an Unpublished Story by : Ed Gross & Thomas Sanders	May 14, 1988
Anzac succumbs to the charms of a sassy Aussie woman, rescued from a disabled research vessel, while a mysterious plague caused by poison from a crate of Nazi gold sweeps the George.
