= The Blue Side =

Single by Crystal Gayle

from the album Miss the Mississippi
- B-side: "Danger Zone"
- Released: May 10, 1980
- Genre: Country
- Length: 3:18
- Label: Columbia
- Songwriters: David Lasley, Allee Willis
- Producer: Allen Reynolds

Crystal Gayle singles chronology
"It's Like We Never Said Goodbye" (1980)	"The Blue Side" (1980)	"If You Ever Change Your Mind" (1980)

"The Blue Side" is a song written by David Lasley and Allee Willis, and recorded by American country music artist Crystal Gayle. It was released in May 1980 as the third single from the album Miss the Mississippi. The song reached number 8 on the Billboard Hot Country Singles & Tracks.

== Critical reception ==
Prior to the song's official release, Billboard noted that the new single was "slower and bluesier then her previous efforts" made for United Artists Records, piano parts resembled "Don't It Make My Brown Eyes Blue".

== Chart performance ==
Chart (1980)	Peak position
US Hot Country Songs (Billboard)	8
US Billboard Hot 100	81
US Adult Contemporary (Billboard)	16
Canadian RPM Country Tracks	4
Canadian RPM Adult Contemporary	3

== Popular culture ==
It was featured in the background of a barroom scene in the Paul Newman crime drama Fort Apache, The Bronx.
