= If You Ever Change Your Mind =

1980 single by Crystal Gayle

Single by Crystal Gayle

from the album These Days
- B-side: "I Just Can't Leave Your Love Alone"
- Released: August 26, 1980
- Genre: Country
- Length: 3:16
- Label: Columbia
- Songwriter(s): Parker McGee; Bob Gundry
- Producer(s): Allen Reynolds

Crystal Gayle singles chronology
"The Blue Side" (1980)	"If You Ever Change Your Mind" (1980)	"Take It Easy" (1981)

"If You Ever Change Your Mind" is a song written by Parker McGee and Bob Gundry, and recorded by American country music artist Crystal Gayle. It was released in August 1980 as the first single from the album These Days. The song was nominated for Best Female Country Vocal Performance at the 23rd Annual Grammy Awards in 1981. The song was Gayle's eighth number one country hit. The single stayed at number one for one week and spent a total of eighteen weeks on the chart, and also peaked at number eighteen on the Adult Contemporary chart.

== Chart performance ==
Chart (1980)	Peak position
US Hot Country Songs (Billboard)	1
US Adult Contemporary (Billboard)	18
Canadian RPM Country Tracks	3
Canadian RPM Adult Contemporary Tracks	5
