= Hot Lead and Cold Feet =

1978 film by Robert Butler

- Theatrical release poster
- Directed by: Robert Butler
- Written by: Joe McEveety; Arthur Alsberg; Don Nelson
- Story by: Rod Piffath
- Produced by: Ron Miller
- Starring: Jim Dale; Karen Valentine; Don Knotts; Jack Elam; Darren McGavin
- Cinematography: Frank V. Phillips
- Edited by: Ray de Leuw
- Music by: Buddy Baker; Walter Sheets (orchestration)
- Production company: Walt Disney Productions
- Distributed by: Buena Vista Distribution
- Release date: July 5, 1978
- Running time: 90 minutes
- Country: United States
- Language: English

Hot Lead and Cold Feet (originally titled Welcome to Bloodshy) is a 1978 American comedy-Western film produced by Walt Disney Productions and starring Jim Dale (in triple roles), Karen Valentine, Don Knotts, Jack Elam and Darren McGavin.

== Plot ==
Mayor Ragsdale and Sheriff Denver Kid meet wealthy businessman Jasper Bloodshy and his English butler Mansfield on the outskirts of the Wild Western town of Bloodshy in the Arizona territory. Mansfield reveals that Bloodshy's doctors indicate he is severely ill and will die within two days. Surveying the land he will leave to his heirs, Bloodshy shocks the mayor and sheriff by revealing that in addition to his infamous gunslinger son Wild Billy, he has another son named Eli. Bloodshy's wife returned home to England with this second son after childbirth. After revealing that he wrote a new will to include both sons, a huge gust of wind blows Bloodshy into a gorge, presumably to his death.

Living in Philadelphia, Eli Bloodshy works as a Salvation Army missionary with two orphan children named Roxanne and Marcus. When he receives a telegram informing him both that he has a father and that this father recently died, Eli travels to Bloodshy with Roxanne and Marcus to claim his inheritance.

In the town of Bloodshy, Billy has earned a reputation as a hot-headed gunslinger who local residents fear. Mayor Ragsdale—who also owns the local saloon—recruits a group of local outlaws, the Snead brothers, to prevent Eli from arriving in Bloodshy to claim his inheritance.

Eli's stagecoach is held up by the outlaws. Unaware that Jasper's other son is a twin, the two Sneads mistake Eli for Billy. The Sneads return to town, but cause the stagecoach to run off, leaving Eli, Marcus and Roxanne stranded. Heading to Bloodshy by foot, they join Jenny Willingham, a teacher who is also headed for Bloodshy to start a school.

Mansfield visits town to present Jasper Bloodshy's will to Sheriff Denver for delivery to Mayor Ragsdale, as Ragsdale will serve as the executor of Bloodshy's estate. The reading of the will reveals that a winner-takes-all contest—the "Bloody Bloodshy Trail"—is involved in awarding the inheritance, including the town, the surrounding land, and an immense fortune.

Upon arriving in the rough-and-tumble town, Eli meets Billy during a stand-off in the saloon. Both soon realize they are identical twins. Ragsdale tells the brothers that their father's will provides for a contest to determine which brother will receive the entire inheritance. Billy and his supporters laugh off the suggestion, believing that Billy easily will win.

Meanwhile, the sheriff is involved in a dispute with Rattlesnake over Rattlesnake's sister. Rattlesnake accuses the sheriff of insulting his sister; the sheriff claims he merely asked her to marry him. The two engage in a series of confrontations around town over the next several days.

Secluded outside of town, it is revealed that Jasper Bloodshy faked his own death to keep a watchful eye over his sons' contest. Mansfield provides Jasper updates on Eli's arrival, including that Eli and Billy are identical twins, an apparent surprise to Jasper.

At a revival meeting the night before the contest, Eli announces that he intends to remain in Bloodshy and use his inheritance to build a new church and school. The townsfolk warn Eli to leave town to save his own life. Eli attempts to reason with Billy to cancel the race and combine their inheritance for the benefit of the town. Billy refuses.

The next day, the contest begins. The contest will be an obstacle course involving a series of five challenges including operating a train engine, paddling through whitewater rapids, scaling the side of a mountain, crossing a gorge using a rope, and racing a horse-drawn wagon to the finish line.

Observing the race from afar, Jasper Bloodshy and Mansfield witness the Snead brothers attempting to sabotage Eli by rigging his steam engine and intoxicating him with "mountain water" and suspect that someone must be behind the scheme, as the Sneads are not smart enough to do so on their own. Mayor Ragsdale has not only colluded with the Snead brothers to sabotage Eli, but also to eliminate Billy, as well. Jasper and Mansfield discover that Ragsdale has adjusted the will so that if no one wins the race, Ragsdale will receive the entire inheritance as executor of the estate.

As the brothers near the contest's finish line and escape the Sneads' ambushes, Eli and Billy realize that Ragsdale has manipulated the race so that both brothers would be killed. The brothers reconcile, complete the race, and expose Ragsdale's scheme for collecting the entire fortune. After a chase through the town, Jasper assists with capturing Ragsdale. Ragsdale is thrown in jail, Sheriff Denver becomes the town's new mayor, and the Bloodshy brothers decide to share their inheritance to improve the town. Eli announces that he'll rebuild the school for Jenny, as well as decides to adopt Roxanne and Marcus.

The story ends with Jasper Bloodshy being spotted by newly appointed mayor Denver as Jasper and Mansfield leave town by stagecoach. They head to Cactus Ridge as Jasper reveals he intends to check on his two daughters, Callico Cate and Wildcat Winnie.

== Cast ==
- Jim Dale as Jasper/Wild Billy/Eli Bloodshy
- Karen Valentine as Jenny Willingham
- Don Knotts as Sheriff Denver Kid
- Darren McGavin as Mayor Ragsdale
- Jack Elam as Rattlesnake
- John Williams as Mansfield
- Warren Vanders as Boss Snead
- Debbie Lytton as Roxanne
- Michael Sharrett as Marcus
- David Cass as Jack
- Richard Wright as Pete
- Don "Red" Barry as Bartender
- Jimmy Van Patten as Jake
- Gregg Palmer as Jeff
- Ed Bakey as Joshua
- John Steadman as Old Codger
- Eric Server as Cowboy
- Paul Lukather as Cowboy
- Hap Lawrence as Cowboy
- Robert Rothwell as Cowboy
- Terry Nichols as Prisoner
- Dallas McKennon as Saloon Man
- Stanley Clements as Saloon Man
- Don Brodie as Saloon Man
- Warde Donovan as Saloon Man
- Ron Honthaner as Saloon Man
- Norland Benson as Farmer
- Jack Bender as Farmer
- Jim Whitecloud as Indian Chief
- Brad Weston as Indian
- Russ Fast as Official
- Mike Howden as Official
- Art Burke as Official
- James Michaelford as Dead-Eye

== Production ==
Portions of the movie were filmed in Deschutes National Forest in central Oregon.

== Music ==
The film features two original songs. "May the Best Man Win" is played during the opening credits sequence. The song was written by Al Kasha and Joel Hirschhorn, and it was performed by Michael Dees. "Something Good Is Bound to Happen" is performed early in the film by Jim Dale, Debbie Lytton, and Michael Sharrett as they attempt to collect donations for the Salvation Army in Philadelphia, as well as at the film's conclusion during a town meeting in Bloodshy. The song was written by Buddy Baker, Arthur Alsberg, and Don Nelson.

== Release ==
Hot Lead and Cold Feet was released on July 5, 1978, by Buena Vista Distribution on a double feature with The Madcap Adventures of Mr. Toad, a re-titled reissue of the 1949 animated featurette The Wind in the Willows (from The Adventures of Ichabod and Mr. Toad).

=== Home media ===
The film was released on VHS three times: March 4, 1980; October 14, 1986; and in 1993. The film received a DVD release on July 6, 2004, and was included in the Don Knotts 4-Movie Collection on September 2, 2012. The film has not been released on Blu-ray as of March 2023.
