= Michael Sharrett =

American actor (born 1965)

- Born: Stuart Michael Sharrett; July 18, 1965 (age 61); Ventura, California, U.S.
- Occupation: Actor
- Years active: 1977 ─ 1995
- Awards: Young Artist Award nominee 1986 Deadly Friend – Tom 'Slime' Toomey

Stuart Michael Sharrett (born July 18, 1965) is an American former actor. Best known for his role in the 1978 family movie The Magic of Lassie with James Stewart, Sharrett additionally co-starred in the 1985 action film Savage Dawn and in the 1986 Wes Craven horror film Deadly Friend, for which he received a Young Artist Award nomination as the "Best Young Actor in a Horror Motion Picture".

== Biography and career ==
Sharrett was born in Ventura, California. Sharrett began his career at the age of 12 in the Emmy Award-winning Our Town, a 1977 television adaptation of the classic play Our Town. On February 20, 1978, Sharrett guest starred on Little House on the Prairie on the episode entitled "The Stranger" about young Peter Lundstrom, who is expelled from his private school for petty theft, so his wealthy father sends the boy to stay with Uncle Nels Oleson in Walnut Grove for a long-overdue lesson in values. At first he rebels but later on learns the pride of hard work and in time his father later realizes that his time with his son is much more important than making any more money as he is quite wealthy already. After some additional television roles and a part in the 1978 Walt Disney comedy western film Hot Lead and Cold Feet, Sharrett landed the role of Chris, the grandson of Clovis, played by Academy Award winner Jimmy Stewart in the 1978 musical film The Magic of Lassie. In The Magic of Lassie, Lassie is a dog owned by Sharrett's freckled-faced character Chris. Lassie is taken away from Chris, who then is put under pressure when his grandpa has to decide whether to sell the valuable family vineyard in return for the dog.

In 1986, Sharrett played Tom in the witty sci-fi/horror movie Deadly Friend. In the teenage friendship story, Tom and his friend Paul bring friend Samantha back to life using a computer chip designed by Paul. Reviews of Sharrett's performance were positive, with a New York Times reviewer writing, "As Tom, Michael Sharrett is a wonderful foil, fainting away at the first kick of Sam's supposedly dead leg." For his performance as Tom, Sharrett received a Young Artist Award nomination in 1986 as the Best Young Actor in a Horror Motion Picture.

In 1988, Sharrett appeared in the short-lived TV series Supercarrier. Two years later, in October 1990, Sharrett served as a main character in an episode of the American television drama The Trials of Rosie O'Neill. In that episode, Sharrett played a seemingly all-American boy accused of desecrating a Jewish cemetery. Rosie, a Los Angeles public defender character played by Sharon Gless in the series, defends Sharrett's character. The episode first aired on Monday, October 22 on CBS.

== Selected filmography ==
=== Films ===
Year	Film	Role	Other notes
1978	Hot Lead and Cold Feet	Marcus	
1978	The Magic of Lassie	Chris Mitchell	
1984	Snowballing	Dan	aka Smooth Moves
1985	Savage Dawn	Danny Rand	
1986	Deadly Friend	Tom 'Slime' Toomey	Received Young Artist Award nomination as the Best Young Actor in a Horror Motion Picture
1989	Kill Me Again	Tim the Motel Clerk	
1995	Theodore Rex	New Eden Volunteer	aka T. Rex

=== Television ===
Year	Show	Role	Other notes
1977	Our Town	Si Crowell	Play filmed for TV
1978	Strange Companions	David	
1978	Little House on the Prairie	Peter Lundstrom	Episode: The Stranger
1979	The Night Rider	Chock Hollister-Young Thomas	
1979	Hanging by a Thread	Tommy Craig	TV movie
1979	A Shining Season	Chuck Lander	
1979	Joe's World	Jimmy Wabash	TV series
1981	Diff'rent Strokes	Henry	Episode: First Day Blues
1984	Newhart		Episode: Send Her Ella
1984	Charles in Charge	Alexander Morgan	Episode: Pilot
1985	Magnum, P.I.	Kenny Harbison	Episode: Paniolo
1985	Otherworld	Stock Clerk	Episode: Rules of Attraction
1986	Our House		Episode: Choices
1986	St. Elsewhere	Donald Westphall	Episode: Time Heals: Part 2
1988	TV 101	Craig Blumen	Episodes: Everything You've Always Wanted to Know About Teenagers (But Were Afraid to Ask) and The Unbearable Rightness of Penny
1988	Supercarrier	Donald Willough, Ocean Specialist 1st Class	Series character
1989	TV 101	Craig Blumen	Episodes: Kangaroo Gate and Clicks
1990	Baywatch	Ben	Episode: Home Cort, Original Air Date:12 January 1990
2003	50 Greatest TV Animals	Chris Mitchell (self)	Uncredited archive footage

== Bibliography ==
- Holmstrom, John. The Moving Picture Boy: An International Encyclopaedia from 1895 to 1995. Norwich, Michael Russell, 1996, p. 356.
