= Too Many Lovers =

Single by Crystal Gayle

from the album These Days
- B-side: "Help Yourself to Each Other"
- Released: May 1981
- Genre: Country
- Length: 3:46
- Label: Columbia
- Songwriter(s): Mark True; Ted Lindsay; Sam Hogin
- Producer(s): Allen Reynolds

Crystal Gayle singles chronology
"Take It Easy" (1981)	"Too Many Lovers" (1981)	"The Woman in Me" (1981)

"Too Many Lovers" is a song written by Sam Hogin, Ted Lindsay and Mark True, and recorded by American country music artist Crystal Gayle. It was released in May 1981 as the third single from the album These Days. The song was Gayle's ninth number one on the country chart. The single went to number one for one week and spent eleven weeks on the country chart.

== Charts ==
Chart (1981)	Peak position
US Hot Country Songs (Billboard)	1
Canadian RPM Country Tracks	1
