= These Days (Crystal Gayle album) =

Studio album by Crystal Gayle
- Released: August 1980
- Studio: Jack's Tracks (Nashville, Tennessee)
- Genre: Country
- Length: 33:53
- Label: Columbia
- Producer: Allen Reynolds

Crystal Gayle chronology
Miss the Mississippi (1979)	These Days (1980)	Favorites (1980)

Singles from These Days
- 1. "If You Ever Change Your Mind" Released: August 26, 1980; 2. "Take It Easy" Released: January 1981; 3. "Too Many Lovers" Released: May 1981

Professional ratings
Review scores
Source	Rating
AllMusic	3.5/5 stars

These Days is the eighth studio album by American country music singer Crystal Gayle. Released in August 1980, it peaked at No. 6 on the Billboard Country Album chart.

Continuing Gayle's run of No. 1 Billboard Country singles, the album contained the No. 1 hits "If You Ever Change Your Mind" and "Too Many Lovers". Another track, "Take It Easy" also became a Country hit, peaking at No. 17.

The album was certified gold by the RIAA in 1994 for sales of over 500,000 copies.

== Track listing ==
No.	Title	Writer(s)	Length
1.	"Too Many Lovers"	Mark True, Ted Lindsay, Sam Hogin	3:46
2.	"If You Ever Change Your Mind"	Parker McGee, Bob Gundry	3:16
3.	"Ain't No Love in the Heart of the City"	Michael Price, Daniel Walsh	3:50
4.	"Same Old Story (Same Old Song)"	Joe Sample, Will Jennings	3:12
5.	"Help Yourselves to Each Other"	Allen Reynolds, Bob McDill	2:50
6.	"Take It Easy"	Delbert McClinton	3:58
7.	"I Just Can't Leave Your Love Alone"	Sample, Jennings	2:54
8.	"You've Almost Got Me Believin'"	Barbara Wyrick	3:30
9.	"Lover Man"	Maxwell Anderson, Kurt Weill	3:44
10.	"What a Little Moonlight Can Do"	Harry M. Woods	2:53

== Personnel ==
- Crystal Gayle - lead and harmony vocals
- Jon Goin, Chris Leuzinger, Billy Sanford - guitar
- Tommy Cogbill, Richard "Spady" Brannan, Joe Allen - bass
- Bobby Wood - acoustic piano, organ
- Charles Cochran - electric and acoustic piano, string arrangements
- Larrie Londin, Gene Chrisman, Kenny Malone - drums
- Farrell Morris - tambourine
- Jay Patten - saxophone
- Denis Solee - saxophone, flute, clarinet
- The Sheldon Kurland Strings (Carl Gorodetzky, Dennis Molchan, George Binkley, Lennie Haight, Marvin Chantry, Roy Christensen, Samuel Terranova, Sheldon Kurland, Stephanie Woolf, Virginia Christensen) - strings
- Bruce Dees, David Loggins, Jennifer Kimball, Marcia Routh, Pebble Daniel, Steve Brantley - harmony vocals on "Take It Easy"

Technical

- Garth Fundis, John Donegan - engineer
- Virginia Team - art direction
- Beverly Parker, Brian Hagiwara - photography

== Charts ==
=== Weekly charts ===
Chart (1980)	Peak position
US Billboard 200	79
US Top Country Albums (Billboard)	6

=== Year-end charts ===
Chart (1981)	Position
US Top Country Albums (Billboard)	28
