= Deadly Friend =

1986 film by Wes Craven

- Theatrical release poster
- Directed by: Wes Craven
- Screenplay by: Bruce Joel Rubin
- Based on: Friend by Diana Henstell
- Produced by: Robert M. Sherman; Robert L. Crawford Jr.
- Starring: Matthew Laborteaux; Kristy Swanson; Michael Sharrett; Anne Twomey
- Cinematography: Philip H. Lathrop
- Edited by: Michael Eliot
- Music by: Charles Bernstein
- Distributed by: Warner Bros. Pictures
- Release date: October 10, 1986
- Running time: 91 minutes
- Country: United States
- Language: English
- Budget: $11 million
- Box office: $8.9 million

Deadly Friend is a 1986 American science fiction horror film directed by Wes Craven, and starring Matthew Laborteaux, Kristy Swanson, Michael Sharrett, Anne Twomey, Richard Marcus, and Anne Ramsey. Its plot follows a teenage computer prodigy who implants a robot's processor into the brain of his teenage neighbor after she is pronounced brain dead; the experiment proves successful, but she swiftly begins a killing spree in their neighborhood. It is based on the 1985 novel Friend by Diana Henstell, which was adapted for the screen by Bruce Joel Rubin.

Originally, the film was a sci-fi thriller without any graphic scenes, with a bigger focus on plot and character development and a dark love story centering on the two main characters, which were not typical aspects of Craven's previous films. After Craven's original cut was shown to a test audience by Warner Bros. Pictures, the audience criticized the lack of graphic, bloody violence and gore that Craven's other films included. Warner Bros. executive vice president Mark Canton and the film's producers then demanded script re-writes and re-shoots, which included filming gorier death scenes and nightmare sequences, similar to the ones from Craven's previous film, A Nightmare on Elm Street. Due to studio imposed re-shoots and re-editing, the film was drastically altered in post-production, losing much of the original plot and more scenes between characters, while other scenes, including more grisly deaths and a new ending, were added. According to the screenwriter, this version was criticized by the studio for containing too much graphic, bloody violence and was cut back for release.

== Source material ==
Friend is a 1985 science fiction horror novel by Diana Henstell. It tells of a 13-year-old boy, Paul "Piggy" Conway who moves to a small town after his parents get divorced. There he befriends a girl named Samantha, but their friendship is cut short when her abusive father throws her down the stairs, mortally injuring her. Piggy tries to save her by implanting a microchip in her, but the reanimated Samantha is much more dangerous than she appears.

== Plot ==
Teenage prodigy Paul Conway and his mother Jeannie move into their new house in the town of Welling. He soon becomes friends with paperboy Tom Toomey. Living next door to Paul is Samantha Pringle and her abusive, alcoholic father Harry. Paul built a robot named BB, which occasionally displays autonomous behavior, such as being protective of Paul. Paul, Jeannie, and BB meet Paul's professor, Dr. Johanson, at Polytech, a prestigious university where Paul has a scholarship.

One day, Tom, Paul and BB stop at the house of reclusive harridan Elvira Parker, who threatens them with a shotgun. The trio then encounters a motorcycle gang led by bully Carl. When Carl intimidates Paul, BB assaults him. Another day, while playing basketball, BB accidentally tosses the ball onto Elvira's porch. She takes the ball away from them and refuses to give it back. On Halloween night, Tom decides to pull a prank on Elvira with the help of Paul, Samantha and BB. BB unlocks her gate and Samantha rings her doorbell. When alarms go off, they hide in a shrubbery nearby. When Elvira sees BB standing near her porch, she destroys him with her shotgun, devastating Paul.

On Thanksgiving, Samantha has dinner with Paul and his mother, and Samantha and Paul share their first kiss. Samantha returns home late at night, outraging her father, who pushes her down the stairs. At the hospital, Paul learns that Samantha is brain dead and will be on life support for 24 hours before the plug is pulled. As BB's microchip can interface with the human brain, Paul decides to use it to revive Samantha with Tom's help. The boys enter the hospital using a key taken from Tom's father, who works there as a security guard. After Tom deactivates the power from the basement, Paul takes Samantha to his lab. He inserts the microchip into Samantha's brain and takes her back to his house, hiding her in the shed. After he activates the microchip, Samantha "wakes up", but her mannerisms are completely mechanical, suggesting BB is in control of her body.

In the middle of the night, Paul finds Samantha staring at the window, looking at her father, and he deactivates her. The next morning, Paul finds Samantha gone. When Harry finds the cellar door open and goes downstairs, Samantha attacks him, breaks his wrist and snaps his neck. Paul finds Samantha, and Harry's corpse, in the cellar. Horrified, he hides the body, takes Samantha back to his home and locks her in his bedroom. At night, Samantha breaks into Elvira's house and corners her by throwing her to the wall of her living room. As Elvira screams in horror, Samantha kills her by smashing her head with the basketball stolen from Tom.

When Tom learns of Samantha's rampage, he gets into a fight with Paul and threatens to call the police. Still being protective of Paul, Samantha jumps out the attic window and attacks Tom, with Paul and Jeannie intervening. Trying to get her under control, Paul slaps Samantha, resulting in her strangling him. Samantha, quickly coming to her senses, lets him go and runs away. As Paul goes after her, he again encounters Carl, who gets into a fight with him. Samantha goes back for Paul, grabs Carl and kills him by throwing him at an incoming police car. She runs back to Paul's shed, where Paul comforts her and realizes she's regaining some of her humanity. However, the police arrive with their guns aimed at Samantha, who yells out Paul's name in her human voice. She runs towards him, trying to protect him, but Sergeant Volchek (Lee Paul), thinking she's trying to attack him, shoots her. She says Paul's name one more time before dying in his arms.

Later at the morgue, Paul tries to steal Samantha's body once more. Suddenly, Samantha grabs Paul's neck and her face rips apart, revealing a malevolent variant of BB's head. Her skin strips away, revealing half-robotic bones underneath. With a robotic voice, Samantha tells him to come with her. When a horrified Paul screams, she snaps his neck, killing him and calls itself as BB.

== Cast ==
- Matthew Laborteaux as Paul Conway
- Kristy Swanson as Samantha Pringle
- Michael Sharrett as Tom Toomey
- Anne Twomey as Jeannie Conway
- Richard Marcus as Harrison Pringle
- Anne Ramsey as Elvira Parker
- Andrew Roperto as Carlos Denton
- Lee Paul as Sergeant Charlie Volchek
- Charles Fleischer as BB (voice)
- Tom Spratley as Neighbor
- Jim Ishida as Coroner
- Russ Marin as Dr. Henry Johanson

== Production ==
=== Development ===
Wes Craven and Bruce Joel Rubin's original intent for the film was for it to be a science fiction thriller with the primary focus being on the dark love story between Paul and Samantha.

=== Casting ===
Kristy Swanson, 16 years old at the time of filming, was cast as Samantha. She admitted that Craven was unsure of her capability to play the role, but ultimately cast her, and was "always encouraging... always prodding me in subtle ways." She elaborated in a 1996 interview: "I committed myself completely to it. I just went full out with it. I wanted to do the best job I could possibly do. I was having the time of my life. As for the movie itself, some people love it, some people hate it. It is what it is. I really enjoyed making Deadly Friend. At that point in my life, it was spectacular."

=== Filming ===
Professional mime artist Richmond Shepard taught Swanson all of the robotic movements that her character has in the film. In an interview, Swanson said this about learning to walk in that specific way: "Getting those moves down was difficult at first. You don't think walking that way is hard until you actually try doing it. But Richmond was a good teacher and I picked up on most of the moves pretty quickly."

During filming of one of the studio-demanded scenes where Sam has a nightmare where her father attacks her in her room and she stabs him with a glass vase, there were difficulties on set with the special effects. Swanson mentioned, "The scene was set up so that I would hit a protective device inside his shirt. But during one take, I missed the device and glass actually shattered on his chest. I freaked out because I thought I had really stuck this glass into his chest. Everybody else just laughed." In another incident, the great amount of fake blood turned out to be a problem. "We had been working on that scene a long time. Finally, it was time for blood to spray out, but something leaked and we had blood spraying all over the set and myself. I was so tired that I started yelling, "More blood!" and the effects people really pumped it out."

In an interview with Maxim magazine in May 2000, Swanson said that the fake head of Elvira that was decimated by the basketball was stuffed with actual cow brains that the production crew picked up from a butcher shop. In a 2006 interview for The Hills Have Eyes, Craven mentioned problems that the basketball scene had with the MPAA: "On Deadly Friend, we had a scene where a nasty old lady gets her head knocked off with a basketball. The actual scene as it was originally cut was fabulous. She was running around the room like a chicken with its head cut off for ten, fifteen seconds. It was bizarre and wonderful and they cut the shit out of it. So I compiled what we called our "Decapitation Compilation," all the films that I knew of that had decapitations in them that had an R, and sent it to them. They immediately sent it back saying they just base it on what they feel in the room at the time. And we had like eight or ten films in there, like The Omen where the guy gets his head cut off by the sheet of glass, and it didn't matter to them."

Craven had a hand in selecting Bruce Joel Rubin to write the screenplay for Deadly Friend. Rubin agreed with Craven that the film should have a gentler tone than his other features. Craven couldn't write the script himself because he was directing episodes of The Twilight Zone at the time. Craven and producer Robert M. Sherman hired Rubin as the screenwriter because they read his script for Jacob's Ladder, which was unproduced at the time.

For the scene chronicling the transplant of BB's microchip into Samantha's brain, Craven called on the advice of retired neurosurgeon William H. Faeth, who has a cameo in the film as a coroner in Sam's hospital room. Craven said that he was very helpful on all the anatomical details.

The robot, BB, cost over $20,000 to build. Craven used a company called Robotics 21. His eyes were constructed from two 1950's camera lenses, a garage remote control unit, and a radio antenna taken from a Corvette. BB could actually lift 7,500 pounds in weight. The voice of BB was provided by Charles Fleischer, who appeared in Wes Craven's previous film A Nightmare on Elm Street as a doctor.

Earlier in production when the film was originally going to be a PG-rated sci-fi thriller, Craven wanted to make something that was similar to John Carpenter's 1984 sci-fi film Starman. Also, according to Swanson in a 1987 interview with Fangoria writer Mark Shapiro, "Craven suggested that I take a look at the movie Starman because what he wanted to do with Deadly Friend was similar in tone to that film." John Carpenter directed Starman because he wanted to get away from his reputation as a director of violent films, just like Wes Craven wanted to make Deadly Friend with a PG rating in mind so he could prove that he could make a film that was not simply "blood and guts" horror.

=== Post-production ===
According to the book Wes Craven: The Art of Horror by John Kenneth Muir, Craven's original cut of the film was "a teenage film filled with charm, wit, and solid performances by likeable teens Swanson and Laborteaux. It was definitely a mainstream, PG film all the way, similar in tone to Real Genius or Short Circuit, but the point was made that Craven could direct something other than double-barreled horror." After principal photography was completed, Craven's original version of the film was screened to a test audience mostly consisting of his fanbase. The response from them was negative, criticizing the lack of violence and gore seen in Craven's other films. Finding that Craven had a large fanbase within the horror genre, Warner Bros.' marketing team insisted that additional scenes of gore and horror be incorporated into the finished film.

The executive vice president of Warner Bros. at the time, Mark Canton, had Rubin write six additional gore scenes into his script, each bloodier than the last. Following the negative reactions from test audiences that saw Craven's first cut of the film and wanted a much more grisly product, it was re-edited in post-production and the more graphic deaths and other re-shot scenes were included, making the final film appear tonally jumbled. Furthermore, with the additional gore introduced, the film struggled being granted an R rating with the Motion Picture Association of America (MPAA) instead of an X due to the overt violence. According to Craven, the film was submitted a total of thirteen times before it was passed.

Editor Michael Eliot was brought in by Warner Bros. to re-edit the original cut of Deadly Friend. Eliot went on to do the same for two other Warner Bros. films, Out for Justice and Showdown in Little Tokyo. While new scenes were added, others such as more scenes between Paul and Samantha that would have made the film more of a love story as originally intended were deleted for length and pacing reasons. Since re-writes, re-shoots, and post production re-editing heavily changed the original story, Craven and Rubin expressed strong anger and heartbreak at the studio and then virtually disowned the film.

Craven was no longer attracted to the story because of Samantha going on a killing spree when she is revived. He was much more interested in exploring the adults around her, all of whom seem to be monsters in human skin. In his own words: "The scares don't come from her, but from the ordinary people, who are actually much more frightening. A father who beats a child is a terrifying figure. That's the one person you're afraid of in the movie. The idea is along the lines that adults can be horrible, without being outside what society says is acceptable."

Swanson commented that she found herself and the other actors caught up in the studio's attempts to strong-arm Craven into making the film more visceral than what was originally intended. During both production and re-shoots, changes to the script were being made, title changes were being discussed, and there were many discussions about how violent and bloody the final film would be. All of these issues caused problems for the actors. Regarding the title changes, when Craven started the project, it was titled Friend, much like the Diana Henstell novel it was based on. The title was later changed to Artificial Intelligence and then to A.I. before the studio and producers finally settled on Deadly Friend.

"We started off doing a picture that Warner Bros. indicated they wanted to do, a macabre love story with a twist. About five weeks into the shoot, they realized who I was and told me not to be inhibited by what they had told me in the past. In a way, I had held back. So, in the last week of shooting, I made up one little nightmare scene and put it into the film. It was the big hit of the screening. So then they came to me and said, 'Listen, what we need is more of that stuff. What we're doing is adding to the deaths of a few people, a jump for the beginning, a new closing scene, and two nightmares—that sort of Wes Craven touch.'"

— Craven on the studio's interference in the final film

In a 1990 interview with Fangoria journalist Daniel Schweiger, screenwriter Bruce Joel Rubin said this about the ending and why it stayed in the film: "That robot coming out of the girl's head belongs solely to Mark Canton, and you don't tell the president of Warner Bros. that his idea stinks!" Rubin also said how at the time, people were still blaming him for the ending where Samantha turns into a robot, even though Canton was the one who conceived it. He also mentioned that despite the fact that the studio destroyed the love story of the movie that he and Craven enjoyed, he still enjoyed working with Craven, confirming that he was not the one who wanted to change the film and that he should not be blamed for what happened to it. Rubin even said that production was one of the happiest experiences he ever had.

In another interview, Rubin told the story about how the $36,000 that he got paid for writing the script for Deadly Friend saved him from going nearly broke due to the four months long Writer's Guild strike and also helped him with a bar mitzvah for his son and to buy a house. In the same interview, Rubin said how at first, he did not want to write the script, but after changing his mind, he called Robert M. Sherman and got the job. He also said how working on the film was one of the most extraordinary experiences of his life: "It was a horror film with a lot of elements that are not things I wanted on my resume. And it didn't do very good business, but it was total fun. My kids were on the set every night. My five-year-old Ari was totally in love with Kristy Swanson, who was the lead. She later became Buffy the Vampire Slayer in the movie. She was really sweet to him and even took him on a date."

== Release ==
=== Censorship ===
Due to all of the gore scenes that were added into the film—as well as Craven's contentious history with the Motion Picture Association of America (MPAA)—it was initially given an X rating. The film was trimmed and resubmitted to the MPAA thirteen times before it was granted an R-rating. Most of the cuts were made to the death scenes of Harry and Elvira.

=== Marketing ===
The theatrical trailer for the film released by Warner Bros. represented it as a straightforward horror film, omitting any reference to its science fiction elements, with BB not appearing in a single frame. The mixture of teenagers and terror as seen in the trailer implied that Deadly Friend would be like Craven's A Nightmare on Elm Street. In an interview with Fangoria, Craven said that the deadline for delivering the first cut of Deadly Friend with all of the studio-demanded sequences included, and delivering his original script for A Nightmare on Elm Street 3: Dream Warriors, which he was writing with Bruce Wagner, was virtually the same, making it very difficult for him to do both things at once.

=== Home media ===
In 2007, Warner Bros. released a DVD edition featuring all of the death scenes in their fully uncut form. In 2021, numerous Twitter users called for Craven's original cut of the film to be released, sharing the hashtag #ReleaseTheCravenCut for both Deadly Friend and Cursed. In October 2021, Scream Factory released the film for the first time on Blu-ray. The Blu-ray features the same cut of the film as issued on the previous Warner Bros. DVD. In a press announcement regarding the Blu-ray release, Scream Factory wrote: "We anticipate being asked if we found any alternate footage from the film (as seen in the original theatrical trailer) or Craven's more milder original feature-length cut. Unfortunately, we could not locate any lost footage after investigating. Sorry, we tried. As fans of the film ourselves we wanted to see that too!"

== Reception ==
=== Box office ===
Hoping to score a financial success with the Halloween trade, Warner Bros. released Deadly Friend in theaters on October 10, 1986, but the film was a box office bomb, grossing $8,988,731 in the United States against an $11 million budget.

=== Critical response ===
AllMovie gave the film a generally negative review, writing, "It's an intriguing combination of elements, but the end result is a schizoid mess", calling Craven's direction "awkward" and opining that it "lacks the intense, sustained atmosphere of his previous horror hits." On Rotten Tomatoes the film has a 19% approval rating based on 36 reviews, with the consensus reading, "An uninspired departure for Wes Craven, mired by an uneven premise; beware, this is one Deadly Friend. On Metacritic it has a score of 44% based on reviews from 11 critics, indicating "mixed or average" reviews.

== Sources ==
- Maddrey, Joseph (2015). "Deadly Friend: An Autopsy" (PDF). Daily Dead. Archived from the original (PDF) on March 13, 2021.
- Muir, John Kenneth (2004). Wes Craven: The Art of Horror. Jefferson, North Carolina: McFarland. ISBN 978-0-786-41923-4.
- Robb, Brian J. (2000). Screams and Nightmares: The Films of Wes Craven. Woodstock, New York: Overlook Press. ISBN 978-1-585-67090-1.
- Wooley, John (2011). Wes Craven: The Man and His Nightmares. Hoboken, New Jersey: Wiley. ISBN 978-0-470-49750-0.
