= Take It Easy (Delbert McClinton song) =

Single by Crystal Gayle

from the album These Days
- B-side: "Ain't No Love in the Heart of the City"
- Released: January 1981
- Recorded: May 1980; Nashville, Tennessee, US
- Genre: Country; Country pop
- Length: 3:58
- Label: Columbia
- Songwriter: Delbert McClinton
- Producer: Allen Reynolds

Crystal Gayle singles chronology
| "If You Ever Change Your Mind" (1980) | "Take It Easy" (1981) | "Too Many Lovers" (1981) |

"Take It Easy" is a song performed by American country music artist Crystal Gayle. It was released in January 1981 as the second single from the album These Days. The song reached No. 17 on the Billboard Hot Country Singles & Tracks chart. The song was written and originally recorded by Delbert McClinton for his 1978 album, Second Wind.

== Background ==
Gayle recorded "Take It Easy" in May 1980 at the Columbia Recording Studio, located in Nashville, Tennessee. Other tracks recorded at the session were "If You Ever Change Your Mind" and "Too Many Lovers". The session was produced by Allen Reynolds.

"Take It Easy" was officially released as a single in January 1981 and peaked at number seventeen on the Billboard Hot Country Singles chart later that year. The song also peaked in the third position on the Canadian RPM Country Songs chart, becoming a larger hit in Canada.

== Track listings ==
7" vinyl single

- "Take It Easy" – 3:58
- "Ain't No Love in the Heart of the City" – 3:50

== Weekly charts ==
| Chart (1981) | Peak position |
|---|---|
| Canada Country Songs (RPM) | 3 |
| US Hot Country Singles (Billboard) | 17 |
