= Claire Holley =

American singer-songwriter

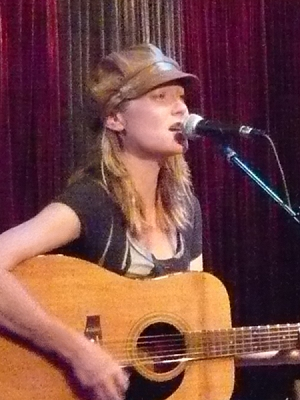
- Singer/Songwriter Claire Holley

Background information
- Also known as: Claire Holley
- Born: Jackson, Mississippi
- Genres: Folk, americana, traditional
- Occupation(s): singer, songwriter, composer, producer
- Instrument(s): Voice, guitar, piano
- Years active: 1993-present
- Website: Official site

Claire Chamblin Holley is an American singer-songwriter from Mississippi now living in Los Angeles. She has released eleven albums and written for TV, indie films, and dance performances. She tours nationwide, and makes her home in Los Angeles, California.

== Life and career ==
Holley grew up in Jackson, Mississippi where at an early age she learned to play the auto-harp, ukulele, piano, and guitar; though it was playing guitar that really piqued her interest. She has said, "I was never that good at playing piano, and maybe that's because I didn't practice enough, but I found the guitar fun to play. It wasn't a chore to practice." Her college days were spent in Chicago and, at the urging of a professor, she set to music a poem by William Blake. Soon thereafter came Holley's first independent release, Night Air. She moved to North Carolina where in 1999 she created a collection of traditional hymns and gospel songs which caught the attention of radio listeners and Yep Rock Records. She was signed and released her third album which was titled simply, Claire Holley.

Holley has written songs for the cystic fibrosis foundation and the Metropolitan Museum of Art has used two of her arrangements of seasonal songs for one of their music releases. She was commissioned to write original music for Arlene Hutton’s play "See Rock City" which premiered at the Crossley Theatre in Hollywood September 2006 and LA Weekly magazine nominated her for "Best Original Music" for the LA Weekly theatre awards for the "See Rock City" songs. Acoustic Guitar Magazine wrote, "Claire Holley is an observer, a romantic reporter from the backyards and front porches of the heartland."

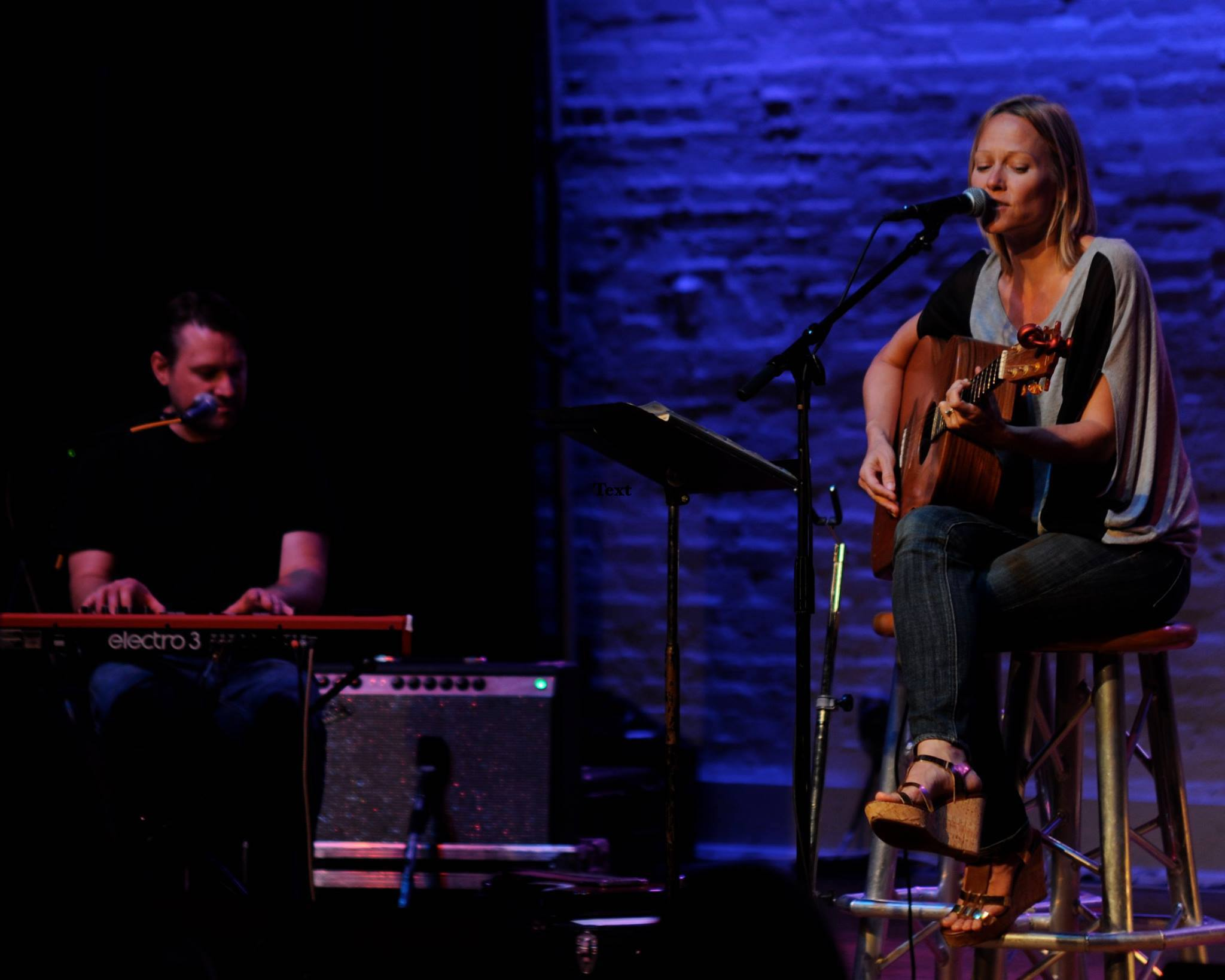
Claire performs with Jonathan Kingham at Duling Hall

Claire Holley has performed with Mary Chapin Carpenter, Kate Campbell, and Caroline Herring, and has composed music for The Fence, an independent film which received the 2008 UCLA Directors Spotlight Award. Mary Chapin Carpenter has said that Holley has an angelic style of writing. Two of her songs have appeared in the ABC TV show Men In Trees and she wrote the original music for the documentary Looking For Lurch in 2008. Holley was also a member of Musette (formerly Song Sirens), a group of female singer-songwriters that performed every so often in Sierra Madre, a little town in the mountains just north of Los Angeles.

In 2013 she formed the group Powdercoat and released a duet EP with fellow songwriter Kristin Mooney. The Huffington Post called it "one of the year's loveliest recordings." Holley announced that her eighth studio album, "Time in the Middle," will be released in June 2015. It was recorded at Sonic Temple studio in Ferndale, CA. Her latest, Every Hour, features modern arrangements of hymns and sacred songs, ranging in style from a 4th century carol to southern gospel and a Beach Boys cover.

Ms. Holley now lives in the Los Angeles area with her husband, Chad, and their two sons.

== Discography ==
- Night Air (1997)
- Sanctuary (1999)
- Claire Holley (2001)
- Dandelion (2003)
- Live at St.Andrew's (2005) – with Caroline Herring
- Hush (2008)
- Christmas EP (2009)
- ABC's For Life (2012) – children's album
- Powdercoat EP (2013) with Kristin Mooney
- Time in the Middle (2015)
- Every Hour (2019)
- Songs from the Tempest (2020)
  - See Rock City, Original Music (2006)
  - Partnered with Kristen Mooney in the band Powdercoat (2013)

Claire's original score for Arlene Hutton's play See Rock City premiered at the Actor's Coop in Hollywood, CA and was nominated for the LA Weekly's 2006 Best Original Music. Claire met the director Nan McNamara at a mutual friend's house soon after moving to the west coast.
