= Midstream (album) =

Studio album by Debby Boone
- Released: July 1978
- Label: Warner Bros.
- Producer: Brooks Arthur (tracks 1–7), Joe Brooks (tracks 8–12)

Debby Boone chronology
You Light Up My Life (1977)	Midstream (1978)	Debby Boone (1979)

Professional ratings
Review scores
Source	Rating
AllMusic	2/5 stars
Christgau's Record Guide	D+

Midstream (1978) is the second studio album by Debby Boone. The album's title refers to the change in producers "midstream" on the album. The first seven songs were produced by Brooks Arthur; the remaining five songs were written and produced by Joe Brooks who was responsible for Boone's "You Light Up My Life." Brooks' songs were all written for his film, If Ever I See You Again. On the film's soundtrack, Boone was only featured on the track, "California". Another Midstream track, "When You're Loved," was one of three songs recorded by Boone for The Magic of Lassie soundtrack.

Midstream failed to match the success of Boone's first solo album, You Light Up My Life. The album only reached No. 147 on the Billboard 200 and none of its singles returned Boone to the Top 10 on either the Pop, Country or AC charts:

The album's singles include:

- "California" (No. 50 Pop, No. 20 AC)
- "God Knows" (No. 74 Pop, No. 22 Country, No. 14 AC)
- "When You're Loved" (No. 48 AC)

== Track listing ==
1. "God Knows" (Franne Golde, Peter Noone, Allee Willis)
2. "What Becomes of My World" (Howard Greenfield, Neil Sedaka)
3. "Another Goodbye" (Scott English, Barry Mann, Cynthia Weil)
4. "Don't You Love Me Anymore" (Bruce Roberts, Carole Bayer Sager)
5. "Oh No, Not My Baby" (Gerry Goffin, Carole King)
6. "I'd Rather Leave While I'm in Love" (Peter Allen, Carole Bayer Sager)
7. "When You're Loved" (Richard M. Sherman, Robert B. Sherman)
8. "California" (Joe Brooks)
9. "When It's Over" (Brooks)
10. "Come Share My Love" (Brooks)
11. "It Was Such a Good Day" (Brooks)
12. "If Ever I See You Again" (Brooks)

== Production credits ==
Arrangers

- Tony Berg
- Artie Butler
- Jimmie Haskell

Conductor

- Artie Butler

Engineers

- Brooks Arthur
- Bob Merritt

Background Vocals

- Jimmie Haskell
