= Reflections of Rosemary =

Studio album by Debby Boone
- Released: April 26, 2005
- Genre: Jazz
- Label: Concord
- Producer: Allen Sviridoff

Debby Boone chronology
You Light Up My Life: Greatest Inspirational Songs (2001)	Reflections of Rosemary (2005)

Reflections of Rosemary is a 2005 album by Debby Boone. It is Boone's first full-length disc recorded for Concord Records. It was released sixteen years after her previous studio album, Home for Christmas (1989).

The album's name, Reflections of Rosemary, refers to American singer and actress Rosemary Clooney, who was Boone's mother-in-law. It is a tribute album for Clooney who died in 2002, intended to be a musical portrait of her, or as Debby Boone put it: "I wanted to select songs that would give an insight into Rosemary from a family perspective".

The album was produced by Allen Sviridoff, who had been Clooney's producer and manager for many years.

Boone said she had chosen songs for the album that Clooney performed or "songs that maybe she recorded that people would never really associate with her".

Boone toured extensively for the album including several nights at New York's famed cabaret, Feinstein's, where Clooney often performed.

== Track listing ==
No.	Title	Length
1.	"Blue Skies"	3:50
2.	"I'll Be Home"	3:12
3.	"The Best Is Yet to Come"	2:46
4.	"I'm So Lonesome I Could Cry"	4:26
5.	"Mood Indigo"	4:28
6.	"It Might as Well Be Spring"	4:27
7.	"Van Heusen Medley: But Beautiful/Moonlight Becomes You/Like Someone in Love"	5:29
8.	"You're Gonna Hear from Me"	3:04
9.	"It Never Entered My Mind/In the Wee Small Hours of the Morning"	5:32
10.	"I've Grown Accustomed to His Face"	4:03
11.	"Time After Time"	3:11
12.	"The Music That Makes Me Dance"	3:59
13.	"You Are There"	3:23
14.	"Blue Skies" (Demo - Hidden Track)	0:49

== Critical reception ==
Professional ratings
Review scores
Source	Rating
AllMusic	3.5/5 stars

Christopher Loudon of JazzTimes thought that "unlike pedestrian salutes that concentrate on the object of adulation's biggest hits, Boone's homage takes a more personal tack, focusing on tunes that speak to specific familial memories".

Another positive review of the album was that by Ronnie D. Lankford, Jr. from AllMusic, who said "Reflections of Rosemary is well sung and tasteful, and should quickly find its place on mainstream jazz's heavy rotation play lists".
