= The Magic of Lassie =

1978 film by Don Chaffey

- Theatrical release poster
- Directed by: Don Chaffey
- Written by: Jean Holloway; Robert B. Sherman; Richard M. Sherman
- Produced by: William Beaudine Jr. Bonita Granville Wrather
- Starring: Mickey Rooney; Pernell Roberts; Stephanie Zimbalist; Michael Sharrett; Alice Faye; Gene Evans; The Mike Curb Congregation; Lassie; James Stewart
- Cinematography: Michael Margulies
- Edited by: John C. Harger
- Music by: Songs: Richard M. Sherman; Robert B. Sherman; Score: Irwin Kostal
- Production company: Lassie Productions
- Distributed by: International Picture Show Company
- Release date: August 2, 1978
- Running time: 100 minutes
- Country: United States
- Language: English
- Budget: $3 million

The Magic of Lassie is a 1978 American musical drama film directed by Don Chaffey, and starring Lassie, James Stewart (in his final appearance in a domestically-released live action feature film), Stephanie Zimbalist, Pernell Roberts and Michael Sharrett, with cameo appearances by Mickey Rooney and Alice Faye (in her final film role). The screenplay and song score are supplied by the prolific Sherman Brothers, who worked as staff songwriters for Walt Disney. Their song "When You're Loved" was nominated for an Academy Award for "Best Original Song" and was sung by Debby Boone. It is also the only musical film featuring Lassie.

Released in the wake of Star Wars, the film was critically panned as old-fashioned, and flopped at the box office. Critics expressed dismay at Stewart singing unmemorable songs as the grandfather. Following the film's failure, he semiretired from acting.

== Plot ==
The Mitchell Vineyard, in the rolling hills of Northern California, is the very blood of Clovis Mitchell, a spare and dignified grandfather and guardian to Kelly and her brother, Chris. The heart of the household, though, is Lassie, a handsome young collie, affectionate, obedient, sensitive, and very wise. A threat is in the air one night when Jamison and his associate, Finch, appear at the winery and offer to buy the land from Clovis. They get a refusal from the old man, while Lassie growls in the background. Jamison promises to return, and does, to claim Lassie, one of a litter he says escaped during a fire. She has a tattoo mark in her right ear to prove it. Clovis has no alternative but to give up the dog, and tells his heart-broken grandchildren. Lassie has an alternative; taken by private plane to Jamison's home in Colorado Springs, fitted with a handsome green collar with gold studs, Lassie makes her escape. Chased by helicopter and kennel men through the rocks and hills of Colorado, Lassie manages to elude them and out-stare a cougar before she joins up with new friends – Gus, a down-at-heel wrestling manager and Apollo, a kindly mountain of a man and Gus's so-called star.

About the time they are binding up Lassie's sores, giving her food and water, and moving along in their van, young Chris bolts on his first day of the school term and sets off alone in search of Lassie. With his distraught grandfather setting out to find the boy, and Kelly and her sweetheart, attorney Allan Fogerty, checking with the police, Chris takes a car conveyor in the direction of Colorado Springs. Soon after the truck takes off, a hungry and frightened Chris leaves the vehicle, buys food in a restaurant from a sympathetic waitress, then goes out to look for another truck, and finally dives into the back of a cattle truck. The restaurant waitress, hearing reports of Chris's disappearance, calls his home and tells his sister where the boy has been, but Chris is on the move again, and so is Lassie. He in an empty cattle truck, she in the doorway of a freight car. Lassie leaps from the freight car and continues her journey. Clovis and the police officer who is aiding in the search for Chris, hear his cries as he is about to be crushed by a herd of Longhorns being loaded into his hiding place. Everybody is home – everybody but Lassie, whose ownership by Clovis has been clarified by Allan, the young attorney, who is about to join the family as an in-law.

Lassie continues her long, painful journey. Wet, sore-footed, and limping, she stumbles on the Mike Curb Congregation, who are rehearsing. The group takes Lassie along to their engagement, where a flare is knocked over, causing a fire. Panic ensues. Lassie is trying to save the life of a kitten from a burning dressing room and is presumed dead.Thanksgiving Day arrives, and the family are settled down to dinner, while Clovis starts to say a prayer, regarding family friends and the loss of their beloved Lassie. During the prayer Chris hears a bark and looks to the fields through the dining room window, and spots Lassie, tired and filthy, wagging over the hill. Chris overjoyed, runs to meet Lassie, while his family watches with this miracle unfold. Lassie leaps at Chris who holds her tight, while Lassie smothers him with kisses. She’s finally home.

== Cast ==
- James Stewart as Clovis Mitchell
- Stephanie Zimbalist as Kelly Mitchell
- Pernell Roberts as Jamison
- Michael Sharrett as Chris Mitchell
- Mickey Rooney as Gus
- Alice Faye as the Waitress (Alice)
- Gene Evans as Sheriff Andrews
- Mike Mazurki as Apollo
- Robert Lussier as Finch
- Lane Davies as Allan Fogerty
- James V. Reynolds as Officer Wilson
- Rayford Barnes as Reward Seeker
- Buck Young as TV Announcer
- Bob Cashell as Ed
- Gary Davis as Motorcycle Officer
- Carl Nielsen as Mr. Kern

== Soundtrack (US version) ==
The Magic of Lassie: Original Motion Picture Soundtrack

Soundtrack album
- Released: November 23, 1978
- Recorded: 1978
- Genre: Soundtrack
- Label: Peter Pan Records
- Producer: Irwin Kostal

Singles from The Magic of Lassie
- 1. "When You're Loved" Released: 1978; 2. "I Can't Say Goodbye" Released: 1979

The film's soundtrack album was released in the United States by Peter Pan Records on November 23, 1978. It was the first soundtrack LP to be issued on the Peter Pan Records label under its Orange Blossom logo. The songs were composed by Robert B. Sherman and Richard M. Sherman, and all music was supervised, arranged, and conducted by Irwin Kostal.

Side 1

1. "When You're Loved" – Debby Boone
2. "Nobody's Property" – Mike Curb Congregation
3. "Travellin' Music" – Mickey Rooney
4. "There'll be Other Friday Nights" – Debby Boone
5. "A Rose Is Not A Rose" – Pat Boone

Side 2

1. "Banjo Song" – Mike Curb Congregation
2. "Brass Rings and Day Dreams" – Debby Boone
3. "That Hometown Feeling" – James Stewart
4. "I Can't Say Goodbye" – Mike Curb Congregation
5. "Thanksgiving Prayer" – James Stewart

== Soundtrack (UK version) ==
The Magic of Lassie: Original Motion Picture Soundtrack

Soundtrack album
- Released: February 1979
- Recorded: 1978
- Genre: Soundtrack
- Label: Pickwick Records
- Producer: Irwin Kostal

A slightly different version of The Magic of Lassie soundtrack with a new cover was issued in the United Kingdom by Pickwick Records in February 1979. The running order of the tracks on this version differ from that of the original soundtrack and three soundtrack songs not featured on the US release are included on the UK release – an instrumental version of "Nobody's Property" conducted by Irwin Kostal, a new recording of "A Rose Is Not a Rose" by Alice Faye and a reprise of "When You're Loved" by Debby Boone.

Side 1

1. "When You're Loved" – Debby Boone
2. "Nobody's Property" – Mike Curb Congregation
3. "Travellin' Music" – Mickey Rooney
4. "There'll be Other Friday Nights" – Debby Boone
5. "A Rose Is Not A Rose" – Pat Boone
6. "Banjo Song" – Mike Curb Congregation

Side 2

1. "Nobody's Property" (Instrumental) – Irwin Kostal
2. "A Rose Is Not A Rose" – Alice Faye
3. "That Hometown Feeling" – James Stewart
4. "Brass Rings and Daydreams" – Debby Boone
5. "Thanksgiving Prayer" – James Stewart
6. "I Can't Say Goodbye" – Mike Curb Congregation
7. "When You're Loved" (Reprise) – Debby Boone

== Production and release ==
=== Filming ===
The film was shot from September 19 to late November 1977 on location in Sonoma County, California at Hop Kiln Winery, Griffin Vineyard on Westside Road, Healdsburg, California. Other locations included Boomtown in Reno, Nevada and Zion National Park in Utah.

=== Release ===
On July 27, 1978, the world premiere of The Magic of Lassie was held at Radio City Music Hall in New York City and broke a box-office record, grossing $40,673.75 on its opening day. It was released in New York on August 2 and nationwide on August 18. It opened in Los Angeles on December 8, 1978.

=== Novelization ===
A paperback novelization of the film was written by Robert Weverka and published by Bantam Books to coincide with the film's release.
