= Savin' It Up =

Studio album by Debby Boone
- Released: December 1980
- Label: Warner Bros./Curb

Debby Boone chronology
With My Song (1980)	Savin' It Up (1980)	Surrender (1983)

Savin' It Up is an album by Debby Boone. After the album Love Has No Reason yielded the No. 1 Country single, "Are You On The Road To Lovin' Me Again", Debby Boone returned to producer Larry Butler for her fifth studio album, Savin' It Up (No. 49 Country), in 1981. The result was not as successful. The album's first single, "Perfect Fool", only reached No. 23 Country and No. 37 AC. The follow-up, "It'll Be Him", missed the Country Top 40 peaking at No. 46.

Boone has since not appeared on any Billboard Country chart. After the release of this album, Boone instead concentrated on a national tour starring in the musical, Seven Brides For Seven Brothers, before recording several Christian albums during the rest of the 1980s.

== Track listing ==
=== Side 1 ===
1. "It'll Be Him" (Billy Ray Reynolds) 3:01
2. "Isn't That Just Like Love" (Richard Leigh) 2:50
3. "Every Day I Have to Cry" (Arthur Alexander) 2:29
4. "Only Wounded" (Peter Allen, Carole Bayer Sager) 3:33
5. "Perfect Fool" (Diane Pfeifer) 2:17

=== Side 2 ===
1. "Savin' It Up" (Randy Goodrum) 3:17
2. "Tonight" (Rafe Van Hoy, Don Cook) 2:55
3. "Too Many Rivers" (Harlan Howard) 3:01
4. "Never Say Never" (Bob Morrison, Mel McDaniel) 2:34
5. "When You Love Me" (Jerry Taylor, Paul Richey) 3:34

== Chart performance ==
Chart (1981)	Peak position
U.S. Billboard Top Country Albums	49
