= Debby Boone (album) =

Studio album by Debby Boone
- Released: August 1979
- Studio: Record Plant (Los Angeles and Sausalito); A&M (Hollywood); Filmways-Heider (Los Angeles)
- Label: Warner Bros.
- Producer: Brooks Arthur

Debby Boone chronology
Midstream (1978)	Debby Boone (1979)	Love Has No Reason (1980)

Debby Boone is a 1979 album by Debby Boone and her third solo studio album for Warner Bros./Curb. Unlike Boone's previous two albums, 1977's You Light Up My Life (No. 6 Pop, No. 6 Country) and 1978's Midstream (No. 147 Pop), this album did not reach any Billboard album chart.

The album featured two singles, "My Heart Has a Mind of Its Own" (No. 11 Country) and "Breakin' in a Brand New Broken Heart" (No. 25 Country), that charted earlier in 1979 prior to the August 21, 1979 release of this album. Oddly, Warner Bros. released Boone's single, "See You in September" (No. 41 Country, No. 45 AC), when this album was released, although this song was not featured on this album. (To date, "See You in September" has not been featured on any Boone album.) Boone's next single, "Everybody's Somebody's Fool" (No. 48 Country), was also not culled from this album. (This single was eventually included on Boone's 1986 compilation, "The Best of Debby Boone.")

Boone married Gabriel Ferrer shortly after the release of this album on September 1, 1979. At the ceremony, Ferrer's mother, Rosemary Clooney, performed "Theme from The Universal Picture "The Promise" (I'll Never Say "Goodbye")" which Boone recorded for this album.

== Track listing ==
Side One

1. "Girl Don't Come" (Chris Andrews)
2. "Jamie" (Jay Gruska, Dennis Belfield)
3. "The Worst That Could Happen" (Jimmy Webb)
4. "With All of My Love" (Bruce Roberts, Allee Willis)
5. "I'll Never Say Goodbye" - Theme from The Universal Picture The Promise (Alan Bergman, Marilyn Bergman, David Shire)

Side Two

1. "Choosey Beggar" (Smokey Robinson, Pete Moore)
2. "Breakin' in a Brand New Broken Heart" (Howard Greenfield, Jack Keller)
3. "Meet Me on the Dance Floor" (BJ Cook Foster, Jay Gruska)
4. "My Heart Has a Mind of Its Own" (Howard Greenfield, Jack Keller)
5. "You Took My Heart by Surprise" (Paul Johnson)
6. "I'd Rather Be Alone" (Bruce Roberts)

== Personnel ==
- Debby Boone - vocals
- Jeff Baxter, Waddy Wachtel, Paul Jackson Jr., Ira Newborn, Dan Dugmore, Dennis Budimir, Lee Ritenour - guitars
- Michel Rubini, Mike Lang, John Barlow Jarvis, David Foster, Lincoln Mayorga, John Hobbs - piano, keyboards
- Michael Boddicker - synthesizers
- Jay Gruska - piano, Minimoog
- Scott Edwards, Andy Muson, Lee Sklar, Jim Hughart - bass
- Ed Greene - drums
- The Seawind Horns - horns
- David Campbell, Don Costa, David Foster, Lee Holdridge - arrangements
