= Are You on the Road to Lovin' Me Again =

Single by Debby Boone

from the album Love Has No Reason
- B-side: "When it's Just You and Me"
- Released: February 1980
- Recorded: November 1979
- Genre: Country
- Length: 2:29
- Label: Warner Bros. 49176
- Songwriter(s): Debbie Hupp; Bob Morrison
- Producer(s): Larry Butler

Debby Boone singles chronology
"Everybody's Somebody's Fool" (1979)	"Are You on the Road to Lovin' Me Again" (1980)	"Free to Be Lonely Again" (1980)

"Are You on the Road to Lovin' Me Again" is a song recorded by American country and pop music artist Debby Boone. It was released in February 1980 as the first single from the album Love Has No Reason. The song was written by Debbie Hupp and Bob Morrison.

The song was Debby Boone's most successful country hit and her only number one on the country chart. The single stayed at number one for a week and spent a total of ten weeks on the country chart.

Nancy Sinatra included a version on her 1995 album "One More Time".

== Historic week ==
The song was part of a historic week on the Billboard Hot Country Singles chart during the week of April 19, 1980. That week, all of the top five positions were held by female singers, the first time in the chart's history this would occur.

The Top 5 from that week was:

1. "It's Like We Never Said Goodbye" by Crystal Gayle
2. "A Lesson in Leavin'" by Dottie West
3. "Are You on the Road to Lovin' Me Again" by Debby Boone
4. "Beneath Still Waters" by Emmylou Harris
5. "Two Story House" by Tammy Wynette (duet with George Jones)

== Charts ==
=== Weekly charts ===
Chart (1980)	Peak position
US Hot Country Songs (Billboard)	1
US Adult Contemporary (Billboard)	31
Canadian RPM Country Tracks	20

=== Year-end charts ===
Chart (1980)	Position
US Hot Country Songs (Billboard)	29
