= It's Like We Never Said Goodbye =

Single by Crystal Gayle

from the album Miss the Mississippi
- B-side: "Don't Go My Love"
- Released: February 1980
- Recorded: 1979
- Genre: Country
- Length: 3:32
- Label: Columbia
- Songwriter(s): Roger Greenaway and Geoff Stephens
- Producer(s): Allen Reynolds

Crystal Gayle singles chronology
"Your Old Cold Shoulder" (1979)	"It's Like We Never Said Goodbye" (1980)	"The Blue Side" (1980)

"It's Like We Never Said Goodbye" is a song written by Roger Greenaway and Geoff Stephens, and recorded by American country music singer Crystal Gayle. It was released in February 1980 as the second single from the album Miss the Mississippi. The song was number one for one week and spent a total of fourteen weeks on the charts.

== Historic week ==
The song was part of a historic week on the Billboard Hot Country Singles chart in the week it reached number one, April 19, 1980. That week, all of the top five positions were held by female singers.

The Top 5 from that week was:

1. "It's Like We Never Said Goodbye" by Crystal Gayle
2. "A Lesson in Leavin'" by Dottie West
3. "Are You on the Road to Lovin' Me Again" by Debby Boone
4. "Beneath Still Waters" by Emmylou Harris
5. "Two Story House" by Tammy Wynette (duet with George Jones)

== Personnel ==
- Gene Chrisman – drums
- Spady Brannan – bass guitar
- Bobby Wood – keyboards
- Chris Leuzinger – guitars
- Billy Puett, Denis Solee – saxophone
- Roger Bissell, Dennis Good, Rex Peer, Terry Williams – trombone
- Crystal Gayle, Garth Fundis, Allen Reynolds - backing vocals

== Charts ==
=== Weekly charts ===
Chart (1980)	Peak position
Canadian RPM Country Tracks	1
Canadian RPM Adult Contemporary Tracks	7
US Hot Country Songs (Billboard)	1
US Adult Contemporary (Billboard)	17
US Billboard Hot 100	63

=== Year-end charts ===
Chart (1980)	Position
US Hot Country Songs (Billboard)	28

== Bibliography ==
- Whitburn, Joel, "Top Country Songs: 1944-2005," 2006, Record Research, ISBN 978-0898201659
