= Cherry Boone =

American singer, noted anorexia survivor

Cheryl Lynn Boone (born July 7, 1954), also known as Cherry Boone O'Neill, is an American writer, author, and singer. She and her three sisters formed the 1970s pop singing group The Boones. Boone has spoken publicly about her experiences and recovery from anorexia nervosa.

== Biography ==
Boone was born in Denton, Texas, the first daughter of Pat Boone and Shirley Lee Foley Boone. She is the granddaughter of country music star Red Foley. She has three sisters, including Debby.

On October 4, 1975, Boone married writer Dan O'Neill, in a ceremony officiated by Jack Hayford, founding pastor of the Church on the Way, in Van Nuys, California. Dan and Cherry have since converted to Catholicism. Her husband was a co-founder of the relief organization Mercy Corps.

== Writing background ==
In 1985, Boone and her husband wrote the book Dear Cherry: Questions and Answers on Eating Disorders, which was a response to letters and questions which she had received after the publication of her first book, Starving for Attention. They later wrote a follow-up book Living on the Border of Disorder: How to Cope with an Addictive Person.

== Published works ==
- Starving for Attention, Continuum, 1982. ISBN 0-85924-231-5
- Dear Cherry: Questions and Answers on Eating Disorders Continuum, 1987. ISBN 0-8264-0387-5
- O'Neill, Cherry Boone; O'Neill, Dan (1992). Living on the border of disorder: how to cope with an addictive person. Minneapolis: Bethany House. ISBN 978-1-55661-262-6.
