= Surrender (Debby Boone album) =

1983 studio album

Studio album by Debby Boone
- Released: 1983
- Length: 39:52
- Label: Sparrow
- Producer: Brown Bannister

Debby Boone chronology
Savin' It Up (1981)	Surrender (1983)	Choose Life (1985)

Professional ratings
Review scores
Source	Rating
Allmusic	2/5 stars

Surrender is the seventh album by singer Debby Boone and her second Christian music album. It was released in 1983 and peaked at number seven on the Top Contemporary Christian chart.

== Track listing ==
1. "O Come All Ye Faithful" (Rich Mullins) [4:08]
2. "Keep the Flame Burning" (David Baroni, Connie Nelson) [4:41]
3. "Can You Reach My Friend" (Billy Sprague, Jim Weber) [4:08]
4. "Lift Him Up" (Russ Hollingsworth, John Rosasco) [4:24]
5. "Wounded Soldier" (Dony McGuire, Reba Rambo) [4:58]
6. "Surrender" (Cloninger, Bill Purse) [3:34]
7. "Keep Rollin' On" (Harry Browning) [4:06]
8. "Find a Hurt and Heal It" (David Baroni, Niles Borop) [2:39]
9. "O Holy One" (Marty Goetz) [4:12]
10. "Blessing" (Pam Mark Hall, Greg Laughery) [3:02]

== Production credits ==
=== Engineer ===
- Jim Baird
- Gene Eichelberger
- Brent King
- Jack Joseph Puig

=== Mastering ===
- Doug Sax

=== Concert Master ===
- Gavyn Wright

=== Strings ===
- Martyn Ford
