= Choose Life (Debby Boone album) =

Studio album by Debby Boone
- Released: 1985
- Length: 42:48
- Label: Lamb & Lion
- Producer: Michael Omartian

Debby Boone chronology
Surrender (1983)	Choose Life (1985)	The Best of Debby Boone (1986)

Professional ratings
Review scores
Source	Rating
AllMusic	2/5 stars

Choose Life is a 1985 album by Debby Boone.

Most of the songs on this album were written by Michael and Stormie Omartian; the former also produced the album. The album peaked on the Top Contemporary Christian charts at No. 7.

== Track listing ==
All tracks composed by Michael Omartian and Stormie Ormartian except where indicated:

1. "The Time Is Now" [4:25]
2. "Pressure Points" [4:20]
3. "Teach Me How to Love" [4:15]
4. "When I Accepted You" [4:03]
5. "Delight in Him" [3:58]
6. "Choose Life" [4:18]
7. "The Heart of the Matter" [5:52]
8. "Right for You" [4:22] (duet between Boone and Michael Omartian)
9. "Song of Deliverance" (Boone, Wendell Burton, Marty Goetz) [3:57]
10. "The Lord Is So Good" (Marty Goetz) [3:18]

== Personnel ==
- Michael Omartian – Keyboards, arranger, percussion, background vocals
- Dara Lynn Bernard – Background vocals
- Joe Chemay – Bass
- Nathan East – Bass
- Khaliq Glover – Background vocals
- Marty Goetz – Piano
- John Guess – Engineer, mixing
- Steve Hall – Mastering
- Gary Herbig – Saxophone
- Abraham Laboriel – Bass
- Michael Landau – Guitar
- Paul Leim – Drums
