= Love Has No Reason =

Studio album by Debby Boone
- Released: March 1980
- Studio: Jack Clement Recording Studios, Nashville, Tennessee
- Label: Warner Bros.
- Producer: Larry Butler

Debby Boone chronology
Debby Boone (1979)	Love Has No Reason (1980)	With My Song (1980)

Love Has No Reason is a 1980 album by Debby Boone. Unable to approach the success of "You Light Up My Life", Boone left Top 40 radio behind in 1980 and turned her career toward Country music with the release of her fourth album, Love Has No Reason (No. 17 Country). Boone had already established a presence on Country radio prior to the release of this album having placed seven singles, including "You Light Up My Life" (No. 4 Country), on Billboard's Country Singles chart. Boone's first album, You Light Up My Life, also reached No. 6 on Billboard's Country Albums chart.

Love Has No Reason was produced by Larry Butler who was responsible for much of Kenny Rogers' music during this era. The album's first single, "Are You On The Road To Lovin' Me Again," rose to No. 1 on the Country singles chart and crossed over to AC radio peaking at No. 31. Two weeks before Road ascended to No. 1, Boone was part of a historic Top 5 on the Billboard Country singles chart. For the week ending April 19, 1980, the Top 5 positions were all held by women:

1. Crystal Gayle (It's Like We Never Said Goodbye)
2. Dottie West (A Lesson in Leaving)
3. Debby Boone (Are You on the Road to Lovin' Me Again)
4. Emmylou Harris (Beneath Still Waters)
5. Tammy Wynette (Two Story House with George Jones)

The album's next two singles did not fare as well. Free To Be Lonely Again peaked at No. 14 Country. (The song's writer, Diane Pfeifer, released the song prior to Boone, but only climbed to No. 85 Country.) The final single, Take It Like A Woman, just missed the Country Top 40 peaking at No. 44. Take It Like A Woman charted at the same time as Colorado Country Morning by her father, Pat Boone, which reached No. 60.

== Track listing ==
1. "Are You on the Road to Lovin' Me Again" (Debbie Hupp, Bob Morrison)
2. "I Wish That I Could Hurt That Way Again" (Curly Putman, Don Cook, Rafe Van Hoy)
3. "Just When I Needed a Love Song" (Diane Pfeifer)
4. "Even a Fool Would Let Go" (Tom Snow, Kerry Chater)
5. "Free to Be Lonely Again" (Diane Pfeifer)
6. "I'd Even Let You Go" (Jim Rushing, Sandy Mason Theoret)
7. "Love Put a Song in My Heart" (Ben Peters)
8. "When It's Just You and Me" (Kenny O'Dell)
9. "If It's So Easy" (Richard Leigh)
10. "Take It Like a Woman" (Norman Sallitt)

== Personnel ==
- Debby Boone - vocals
- Tommy Cogbill, Bob Moore - bass
- Jerry Carrigan - drums
- Jimmy Capps, Ray Edenton, Billy Sanford - guitar
- David Briggs - piano
- Buzz Cason, Wendy Suits, Diane Tidwell, Dennis Wilson - backing vocals
- Bill Justis - string arrangements

Technical

- Billy Sherrill - engineer
- Ethan Russell - photography

== Chart performance ==
Chart (1980)	Peak position
U.S. Billboard Top Country Albums	17
