= Friends for Life (Debby Boone album) =

Studio album by Debby Boone
- Released: 1987
- Length: 45:21
- Label: Benson
- Producer: Michael Omartian, Dan Posthuma

Debby Boone chronology
| The Best of Debby Boone (1986) | Friends for Life (1987) | Love Put a Song in My Heart (1988) |

Professional ratings
Review scores
| Source | Rating |
|---|---|
| AllMusic | 4.5/5 stars |

Friends for Life is a 1987 album by Debby Boone.

The album was a success, peaking at #4 on the Top Contemporary Christian charts.

== Track listing ==
1. "Be Ye Glad" (Michael K. Blanchard) [4:17]
2. "Make Me Ready" (Michael Omartian, Stormie Omartian) [5:00]
3. "Unconditional Love" (Randy Goodrum) [4:58]
4. "To Every Generation" (Bill Batstone) [5:38]
5. "The Name Above All Names" (Chuck Girard) [4:46]
6. "A Little Broken Bread" (Bill Batstone) [4:33]
7. "Above All Else" (Michael Omartian, Stormie Omartian) [4:31]
8. "Masihlanganeni (Let Us Stand Together)" (J.B. Arthur, Danny Bridgens, Nic Paton, Victor Phume) [5:01]
9. "Friends for Life" (Michael Omartian, Stormie Omartian) [3:27]
10. "Sincerely Yours" (Gary Chapman) [3:10]

== Production credits ==
Engineers

- Terry Christian
- Dan Garcia
- John Guess
- Tom Perry
- David Schober

Mixing

- Terry Christian
- John Guess
- Bill Schnee

Mastering

- Doug Sax

Synthesizer Programming

- Erich Bulling

Design

- Stan Evenson

Photography

- Raul Vega

Acoustic Guitar

- Bill Batstone
- Dann Huff

Bass

- Leland Sklar
- Neil Stubenhaus

Drums

- John Keane

Electric Guitar

- Dann Huff

Percussion

- Paulinho Da Costa

Piano

- Michael Omartian

Synthesizer

- Randy Goodrum
- Rhett Lawrence
- Michael Omartian

Background Vocals

- Bill Batstone
- Dara Lynn Bernard
- Bill Champlin
- Tamara Champlin
- Billy Crockett
- Chuck Girard
- Randy Goodrum
- Debbie McNeil
- Gene Miller
- Lisa Whelchel
- Scott Wojahn
