= With My Song =

Studio album by Debby Boone
- Released: 1980
- Length: 42:02
- Label: Sparrow
- Producer: Brown Bannister

Debby Boone chronology
| Love Has No Reason (1980) | With My Song (1980) | Savin' It Up (1981) |

Professional ratings
Review scores
| Source | Rating |
|---|---|
| AllMusic | 2/5 stars |

With My Song is a 1980 album by Debby Boone and her second studio album of that year. It was also her first to feature Christian music.

== Track listing ==
1. "Sweet Adoration" (Brown Bannister, Dawn Rodgers, Lynn Sutter-Adler) [2:54]
2. "If Ever" (Pam Mark Hall) [4:34]
3. "With Every Breath" (Bryan MacLean) [2:22]
4. "With My Song" (Dony McGuire, Reba Rambo) [4:40]
5. "I Am Stone" (Phill McHugh) [4:34]
6. "Lord, I Believe" (Shane Keister, Alice Keister) [3:19]
7. "Morningstar" (Hall) [4:45]
8. "A New Song" (Bob Kauflin) [3:35]
9. "The Twenty-Third Psalm" (Marty Goetz) [2:50]
10. "Holy Father" (Arranged by Brown Bannister) [4:01]
11. "Sixty Second Sonata" (Bob Farnsworth) [1:30]
12. "What Can I Do for You" (Bob Dylan) [2:58]

== Production credits ==
Producer

- Brown Bannister

Arranger

- Brown Bannister

Engineers

- Brown Bannister
- Jimmy Burch
- Brent King
- Warren Peterson
- Jack Joseph Puig

Mastering

- Glenn Meadows

Remixing

- Brown Bannister
- Jimmy Burch
- Brent King
- Warren Peterson

Overdubs

- Jimmy Burch
- Warren Peterson

Rhythm Track

- Jack Joseph Puig

Bass

- Abraham Laboriel
- Leland Sklar

Drums

- Paul Leim

Guitar (Acoustic)

- Johnny Christopher
- Steve Kara
- Don Roth
- Billy Joe Walker Jr.

Guitar (Electric)

- Billy Joe Walker Jr.

Harp

- Cindy Reynolds

Horn

- Dennis Good
- Billy Puett
- Don Sheffield
- Denis Solee
- George Tidwell

Oboe

- Bobby G. Taylor

Piano

- John Hobbs
- Shane Keister
- Larry Muhoberac

Percussion

- Farrell Morris

Synthesizer

- Shane Keister

Background Vocals

- Mark Baldwin
- Steve Brantley
- Thomas Cain
- Linda Corbin
- Bruce Dees
- Diana DeWitt
- Theresa Ellis
- Janie Fricke
- Marty Goetz
- Teresa Jones
- Bob Kauflin
- Marty McCall
- Donna McElroy
- Don Nalle
- Ed Nalle
- Gary Pigg
