= Home for Christmas (Debby Boone album) =

Studio album by Debby Boone
- Released: 1989
- Label: Benson
- Producer: Gabriel Ferrer, Dan Posthuma

Debby Boone chronology
Reflections (1989)	Home for Christmas (1989)	You Light Up My Life (2001)

Professional ratings
Review scores
Source	Rating
AllMusic	2.5/5 stars

Home for Christmas is the title of a 1989 album by Debby Boone. This was Boone's only Christmas album but was reproduced on multiple occasions. Three different editions of the album were produced; one in 1989, a CD re-release in 1992, and another CD with new cover art in 2002. There are three different versions of the cover art for the album.

== Track listing ==
1. "Overture" [4:40]
2. "Some Children See Him" (Alfred Burt, Wihla Hutson) [2:58]
3. "Christmas Time Is Here" (Vince Guaraldi, Lee Mendelson) [2:43]
4. "Sleigh Ride" (Leroy Anderson, Mitchell Parish) [2:58]
5. "White Christmas" - with Rosemary Clooney (Irving Berlin) [3:44]
6. "I'll Be Home for Christmas" (Kim Gannon, Walter Kent, Buck Ram) [2:25]
7. "O Come, O Come, Emmanuel" (John M. Neale, Traditional) [3:21]
8. "Silver Bells" (Ray Evans, Jay Livingston) [3:19]
9. "Hark! The Herald Angels Sing" (Felix Mendelssohn, Charles Wesley) [2:45]
10. "O Holy Night" (Adolphe Adam, John Sullivan Dwight) [3:01]
11. "Silent Night" (Franz Xaver Gruber, Joseph Mohr) [2:49]

== Production credits ==
Engineers

- Bob Clark
- Dan Garcia
- Warren Peterson

Director

- Regina Acuna

Arrangers

- David T. Clydesdale
- Ronn Huff
- David Maddux
- M. Maddux

Choir, Chorus

- Daniel Acuna
- Diana Acuna
- Akil Thompson
- Jake Young

Conductor

- Ronn Huff

Rhythm

- Michael Omartian
- Dean Parks
- John Patitucci
- John "J.R." Robinson

Art Direction

- Lee Ann Ramey

Photography

- Mark Tucker
