= You Light Up My Life (Debby Boone album) =

Studio album by Debby Boone
- Released: June 15, 1977
- Recorded: 1977
- Genre: Pop
- Length: 38:12
- Label: Warner Bros./Curb
- Producer: Mike Curb, Michael Lloyd, Joe Brooks, Bob Gaudio

Debby Boone chronology
You Light Up My Life (1977)	Midstream (1978)

Professional ratings
Review scores
Source	Rating
AllMusic	2/5 stars
Christgau's Record Guide	D
The Rolling Stone Record Guide	1/5 stars

You Light Up My Life (1977) is the first solo album from singer Debby Boone. After the title track reached No. 1 on the Billboard Hot 100, Boone needed to quickly assemble her first solo album. The result was a RIAA-certified platinum album (No. 6 Pop, No. 6 Country, No. 1 Canada (3 weeks)). Joe Brooks produced the album after writing and producing the title track.

Several tracks from Boone's album were previously recorded by Boone with her sisters as part of their work as the Boones. The album's closing track, "Hasta Mañana", written and recorded by ABBA, had charted earlier in 1977 for the Boones peaking at No. 32 AC. "When the Lovelight Starts Shining Through His Eyes" was released two years earlier in 1975 by the Boones reaching No. 25 AC. The track "Baby I'm Yours" was released as the credited B-side of Boone's third single, "God Knows" (No. 74 Pop, No. 22 Country, No. 14 AC, No. 98 Canada), from her second album, Midstream.

== Track listing ==
1. "You Light Up My Life" Original Theme from the Motion Picture You Light Up My Life (Joseph Brooks) [3:35]
2. "A Rock and Roll Song" (Joseph Brooks) [3:37]
3. "Micol's Theme" (Joseph Brooks) [3:07]
4. "It's Just a Matter of Time" (Cherry Boone) [3:02]
5. "Hey Everybody" (Joseph Brooks) [4:26]
6. "When I Look at You (My Love)" (Bob Gaudio, Larry Finley) [3:50]
7. "From Me to You" (John Lennon, Paul McCartney) [2:20]
8. "Baby I'm Yours" (Van McCoy) [2:36]
9. "When the Lovelight Starts Shining Through His Eyes" (Holland-Dozier-Holland) [3:09]
10. "The End of the World" (Sylvia Dee, Arthur Kent) [2:31]
11. "Your Love Broke Through" (Keith Green, Todd Fishkind, Randy Stonehill) [2:57]
12. "Hasta Mañana" (Stig Anderson, Benny Andersson, Björn Ulvaeus) [3:12]
