= Joe Stampley discography =

- Studio albums: 20
- Live albums: 2
- Compilation albums: 9
- Singles: 62
- Music videos: 2

Joe Stampley is an American country music artist. His discography consists of 20 studio albums, nine compilation albums, two live albums, 62 singles, and two music videos. All 62 of his singles charted on the Billboard Hot Country Songs chart between 1971 and 1989, including four number one hits: "Soul Song" (1972), "Roll On Big Mama" (1975), "All These Things" (1976), and "Just Good Ol' Boys" (with Moe Bandy) (1979).

== Albums ==
=== Studio albums ===
Title	Album details	Peak positions		
Title	Album details	US Country	US	CAN Country
If You Touch Me (You've Got to Love Me)	Release year: 1972; Label: Dot	17	—	—
Soul Song	Release year: 1973; Label: Dot	13	—	—
I'm Still Loving You	Release year: 1974; Label: Dot	7	—	—
Take Me Home to Somewhere	Release year: 1974; Label: ABC / Dot	16	—	—
Joe Stampley	Release year: 1975; Label: Epic	24	—	—
Billy, Get Me a Woman	Release year: 1975; Label: Epic	20	—	—
The Sheik of Chicago	Release year: 1976; Label: Epic	38	—	—
Ten Songs About Her	Release year: 1976; Label: Epic	30	—	—
Sat. Nite Dance	Release year: 1977; Label: Epic	48	—	—
Red Wine and Blue Memories	Release year: 1978; Label: Epic	24	—	12
I Don't Lie	Release year: 1979; Label: Epic	42	—	—
Just Good Ol' Boys (with Moe Bandy)	Release year: 1979; Label: Columbia	11	—	—
After Hours	Release year: 1980; Label: Epic	60	—	—
I'm Gonna Love You Back to Loving Me Again	Release year: 1981; Label: Epic	33	—	—
Hey Joe! Hey Moe! (with Moe Bandy)	Release year: 1981; Label: Columbia	23	170	—
I'm Goin' Hurtin'	Release year: 1982; Label: Epic	37	—	—
Backslidin'	Release year: 1982; Label: Epic	63	—	—
Memory Lane	Release year: 1983; Label: Epic	36	—	—
The Good Ol' Boys — Alive and Well (with Moe Bandy)	Release year: 1984; Label: Columbia	21	—	—
I'll Still Be Loving You	Release year: 1985; Label: Epic	—	—	—
"—" denotes releases that did not chart

=== Compilation albums ===
Title	Album details	Peak positions
Title	Album details	US Country
Joe Stampley's Greatest Hits Volume 1	Release year: 1975; Label: ABC / Dot	28
All These Things	Release year: 1976; Label: ABC / Dot	4
Greatest Hits	Release year: 1978; Label: Epic	42
Encore	Release year: 1981; Label: Epic	—
Biggest Hits	Release year: 1982; Label: Epic	—
Greatest Hits (with Moe Bandy)	Release year: 1982; Label: Columbia	—
The Very Best of Joe Stampley	Release year: 1982; Label: MCA	—
Good Ol' Boy — His Greatest Hits	Release year: 1995; Label: Razor & Tie	—
Super Hits (with Moe Bandy)	Release year: 1999; Label: Columbia	—
"—" denotes releases that did not chart

=== Live albums ===
Title	Album details
Live from Bad Bob's, Memphis (with Moe Bandy)	Release year: 1985; Label: Columbia
Live at Billy Bob's Texas (with Moe Bandy)	Release year: 2000; Label: Smith / Razor & Tie

== Singles ==
=== 1970s ===
Year	Single	Peak positions			Album
Year	Single	US Country	US	CAN Country	Album
1971	"Take Time to Know Her"	74	—	—	If You Touch Me (You've Got to Love Me)
1972	"Hello Operator"	75	—	—	If You Touch Me (You've Got to Love Me)
1972	"If You Touch Me (You've Got to Love Me)"	9	—	15	If You Touch Me (You've Got to Love Me)
1972	"Soul Song"	1	37	2	Soul Song
1973	"Bring It On Home (To Your Woman)"	7	—	4	Soul Song
1973	"Too Far Gone"	12	—	23	Soul Song
1973	"I'm Still Loving You"	3	—	2	I'm Still Loving You
1974	"How Lucky Can One Man Be"	11	—	7	I'm Still Loving You
1974	"Take Me Home to Somewhere"	5	—	9	Take Me Home to Somewhere
1975	"Penny"	8	—	7	Take Me Home to Somewhere
1975	"Roll On Big Mama"	1	—	1	Joe Stampley
1975	"Unchained Melody"	41	—	—	Take Me Home to Somewhere
1975	"Dear Woman"	11	—	9	Joe Stampley
1975	"Cry Like a Baby"	70	—	—	All These Things
1975	"Billy, Get Me a Woman"	12	—	30	Billy, Get Me a Woman
1975	"She's Helping Me Get Over Loving You"	25	—	28	Billy, Get Me a Woman
1976	"You Make Life Easy"	61	—	—	All These Things
1976	"The Sheik of Chicago"	43	—	—	The Sheik of Chicago
1976	"All These Things"	1	—	22	All These Things
1976	"Was It Worth It"	43	—	—	The Sheik of Chicago
1976	"The Night Time and My Baby"	16	—	37	All These Things
1976	"Whiskey Talkin'"	18	—	31	The Sheik of Chicago
1976	"Everything I Own"	12	—	26	All These Things
1976	"There She Goes Again"	11	—	49	Ten Songs About Her
1977	"She's Long Legged"	26	—	26	Ten Songs About Her
1977	"Baby, I Love You So"	15	—	20	Sat. Nite Dance
1977	"Everyday I Have to Cry Some"	14	—	7	Sat. Nite Dance
1978	"Red Wine and Blue Memories"	6	—	7	Red Wine and Blue Memories
1978	"If You've Got Ten Minutes (Let's Fall in Love)"	6	—	9	Red Wine and Blue Memories
1978	"Do You Ever Fool Around"	5	—	3	Red Wine and Blue Memories
1979	"I Don't Lie"	12	—	21	I Don't Lie
1979	"Just Good Ol' Boys" (with Moe Bandy)	1	—	8	Just Good Ol' Boys
1979	"Put Your Clothes Back On"	9	—	9	I Don't Lie
1979	"Holding the Bag" (with Moe Bandy)	7	—	7	Just Good Ol' Boys
"—" denotes releases that did not chart

=== 1980s ===
Year	Single	Peak positions		Album
Year	Single	US Country	CAN Country	Album
1980	"After Hours"	17	59	After Hours
1980	"Tell Ole I Ain't Here, He Better Get on Home" (with Moe Bandy)	11	15	Just Good Ol' Boys
1980	"Haven't I Loved You Somewhere Before"	32	31	After Hours
1980	"There's Another Woman"	18	36	After Hours
1981	"I'm Gonna Love You Back to Loving Me Again"	9	—	I'm Gonna Love You Back to Loving Me Again
1981	"Hey Joe (Hey Moe)" (with Moe Bandy)	10	8	Hey Joe! Hey Moe!
1981	"Whiskey Chasin'"	18	21	I'm Gonna Love You Back to Loving Me Again
1981	"Honky Tonk Queen" (with Moe Bandy)	12	11	Hey Joe! Hey Moe!
1981	"All These Things" (re-recording)	62	—	I'm Gonna Love You Back to Loving Me Again
1981	"Let's Get Together and Cry"	41	—	I'm Gonna Love You Back to Loving Me Again
1982	"I'm Goin' Hurtin'"	18	24	I'm Goin' Hurtin'
1982	"I Didn't Know You Could Break a Broken Heart"	30	—	I'm Goin' Hurtin'
1982	"Backslidin'"	25	—	Backslidin'
1983	"Finding You"	24	—	Backslidin'
1983	"Poor Side of Town"	12	—	Backslidin'
1983	"Double Shot (Of My Baby's Love)"	8	14	Memory Lane
1984	"Brown Eyed Girl"	29	42	Memory Lane
1984	"Memory Lane" (with Jessica Boucher)	39	36	Memory Lane
1984	"Where's the Dress" (with Moe Bandy)	8	8	The Good Ol' Boys — Alive and Well
1984	"The Boy's Night Out" (with Moe Bandy)	36	24	The Good Ol' Boys — Alive and Well
1985	"Daddy's Honky Tonk" (with Moe Bandy)	48	45	The Good Ol' Boys — Alive and Well
1985	"Still on a Roll" (with Moe Bandy)	58	—	The Good Ol' Boys — Alive and Well
1985	"When Something Is Wrong with My Baby"	67	—	I'll Still Be Loving You
1985	"I'll Still Be Loving You"	47	—	I'll Still Be Loving You
1986	"When You Were Blue and I Was Green"	72	—	I'll Still Be Loving You
1988	"Cry Baby"	56	—	Non-album singles
1989	"You Sure Got This Ol' Redneck Feelin' Blue"	89	—	Non-album singles
1989	"If You Don't Know Me by Now"	59	—	Non-album singles
"—" denotes releases that did not chart

== Music videos ==
Year	Video
1979	"Just Good Ol' Boys" (with Moe Bandy)
1984	"Where's the Dress" (with Moe Bandy)

== See also ==
- The Uniques (Louisiana band)
