= Just Good Ol' Boys =

Single by Moe Bandy and Joe Stampley

from the album Just Good Ol' Boys
- B-side: "Make a Little Love Each Day"
- Released: July 1979
- Genre: Country
- Length: 2:38
- Label: Columbia
- Songwriter: Ansley Fleetwood
- Producer: Ray Baker

Moe Bandy and Joe Stampley singles chronology
"Just Good Ol' Boys" (1979)	"Holding the Bag" (1979)

"Just Good Ol' Boys" is a 1979 novelty single by the duo of Moe Bandy and Joe Stampley. "Just Good Ol' Boys" would be a number one single and the most successful collaboration of Moe Bandy and Joe Stampley. The single stayed at number one for one week and spent a total of eleven weeks on the country chart.

== Background ==
Bandy and Stampley had previously enjoyed success as solo artists, both with several honky-tonk standard hits to their credit. Bandy's most successful singles to this point included "Bandy the Rodeo Clown," "Hank Williams You Wrote My Life" and "It's a Cheating Situation," while Stampley had best been known for songs like "Soul Song," "All These Things" and "Roll On Big Mama."

Unlike their most successful solo hits, the new duo – which became known as "Moe and Joe" – was focused more on comedy and novelty songs. Many of these songs, including "Just Good Ol' Boys," took a tongue in cheek approach. Here, two friends complain about their rowdy reputations in town, each bemoaning various drunk-and-disorderly incidents they had been accused of. While each freely admit they indeed were responsible for such actions as fighting in taverns, stealing a municipal vehicle and rolling the truck over in the mayor's yard, physical violence against the boss and a brother-in-law (the latter for a failed football bet), not paying an alimony payment that's now six weeks overdue, and so forth, "... other than that, we ain't nothin', just good ol' boys" – meaning, that despite their reputations, they are not really that bad and that their actions amount to nothing more than harmless mischief.

"Just Good Ol' Boys" was the most successful of the "Moe and Joe" collaborations, and led to a series of albums and singles together. The most successful of their later singles included "Holding the Bag," "Hey Moe, Hey Joe" (a cover of a single originally recorded by Carl Smith, with a modified title and lyrics), and "Where's the Dress" (a satire on Boy George and Culture Club).

== Charts ==
=== Weekly charts ===
Chart (1979)	Peak position
US Hot Country Songs (Billboard)	1
Canadian RPM Country Tracks	8

=== Year-end charts ===
Chart (1979)	Position
US Hot Country Songs (Billboard)	13
