= Good news =

Good News is another term for the gospel, referring to the message of Jesus.

Good news may also refer to:

== Arts, entertainment, and media ==
=== Films and musicals ===
- Good News (musical), opened on Broadway in 1927
  - Good News (1930 film), an American MGM musical film based on the stage production starring Bessie Love
  - Good News (1947 film), an American MGM musical film based on the stage production starring June Allyson
- Good News (1954 film), a Spanish comedy film
- Good News (1979 film), an Italian satirical comedy film starring Giancarlo Giannini
- Good News, a 1990 film by Ulrich Seidl
- The Good News (film), a 2008 Spanish film
- Good Newwz, a 2019 Indian romantic comedy film
- Taurus (2022 film), also known as Good News
- Good News (2025 film), a South Korean action thriller film

=== Literature ===
- Good News (novel), a 1980 novel by Edward Abbey
- Good News, a 1945 non-fiction work by Cyril Alington

=== Music ===
==== Albums ====
- Good News (Cliff Richard album), 1967
- Good News!, a 1973 album by Jody Miller
- Good News, a 1975 album by Pasadena Roof Orchestra
- Good News, a 1981 album by Sweet Honey in the Rock
- Good News (Lena album), 2011, or the title song
- Good News (Kathy Mattea album), 1993, or the title song
- Good News (Matt Dusk album), 2009, or the title song
- Good News (Withered Hand album)
- Good News (Ian Yates album), 2012
- Good News (Bryan Rice album), 2007, or the title song
- The Good News (album), a 2015 album by All Things New
- Good News (Rend Collective album) A 2018 album by Rend Collective
- Good News (Megan Thee Stallion album), 2020

==== Songs ====
- "Good News" (Louis Gottlieb song), 1959
- "Good News" (Jody Miller song), 1973
- "Good News" (Ocean Park Standoff song), 2016
- "Good News" (Mac Miller song), 2020
- "Good News" (Shaboozey song), 2024
- "Good News", a 1998 song by Ringo Starr from Vertical Man
- "Rescuer (Good News)", a 2017 single by Rend Collective
- "Good News", a 2018 single by Mandisa
- "Good News", a 2019 song by K.Flay from Solutions
- "Good News (Ya-Ya Song)", a 2019 song by MUNA from Saves the World
- "Good News", a 2021 song by Pop Smoke from Faith
- "Good News", a 2022 song by Lightsum from Into The Light
- "Ain't That Good News" (song), also known as "Good News", a 1964 song by Sam Cooke

=== Religious publications ===
- Good News Bible (GNB), an English translation of the Bible by the American Bible Society
- The Good News (magazine), a religious magazine published by the United Church of God

=== Television ===
- Good News Today, an Indian TV channel
- Good News (Philippine TV program), a Philippine news magazine show
- Good News (TV series), a 1997 American situation comedy
- Russell Howard's Good News, a BBC comedy and topical television news show
- "The Good News" (Mad Men), a 2010 episode of Mad Men

=== Other uses in arts, entertainment, and media ===
- Good News (duo), an American duo who appeared on The X Factor (U.S. TV series)

== Other uses ==
- Good News Club v. Milford Central School, a 2001 U.S. Supreme Court case
- Macintosh's Good News, a box of chocolates on which George Harrison based the lyric of The Beatles' "Savoy Truffle"
