= Will You Love Me Tomorrow? (album) =

Studio album by Jody Miller
- Released: March 1976
- Recorded: May–December 1975
- Studio: Columbia (Nashville, Tennessee)
- Genre: Country
- Label: Epic
- Producer: Billy Sherrill

Jody Miller chronology
Country Girl (1975)	Will You Love Me Tomorrow? (1976)	Here's Jody Miller (1977)

Singles from Will You Love Me Tomorrow?
- 1. "Don't Take It Away" Released: June 1975; 2. "Will You Love Me Tomorrow" Released: October 1975; 3. "Ashes of Love" Released: March 1976

Will You Love Me Tomorrow? is a studio album by American singer Jody Miller. It was released in March 1976 via Epic Records and featured ten tracks. The album's material was mostly cover songs, along with several new tracks. Three of its covers were released as singles: "Don't Take It Away", "Will You Love Me Tomorrow" and "Ashes of Love". All three recordings reached charting positions on America's country songs charts between 1975 and 1976. Will You Love Tomorrow? received positive reviews from critics.

== Background ==
During the 1970s, Jody Miller worked alongside producer Billy Sherrill in Nashville, Tennessee. Under Sherrill's direction, she had her greatest commercial success as a country recording artist. Her top ten and top 20 singles occurred during the early half of the decade. By the middle decade, Miller's success began to wane. Despite this, she continued recording for her record label. Billy Sherrill would produce her 1976 studio album Will You Love Me Tomorrow?. "I was so fortunate to have Billy care for my recordings, and work for my success in country music at the time. And the amazing thing is, he was handling others' music careers at the same time: Tammy Wynette, George Jones and Charlie Rich", Miller reflected on her website.

== Recording and content ==
Will You Love Tomorrow was recorded at the Columbia Studios in Nashville with Sherrill serving as the sole producer. Sessions were held between May and December 1975. The album consisted of ten tracks. Many of the album's songs were covers. Miller and Sherrill covered material that had been Billboard pop successes for other artists. Pop covers included Percy Sledge's number 11 single "Take Time to Know Him" and The Shirelles's chart-topping "Will You Love Me Tomorrow". Also included were covers of Billboard country songs, such as Ray Price's "A Thing Called Sadness", "Ashes of Love" (a top 20 song for Dickey Lee and a top 40 song for Don Gibson) and Charlie Rich's top five recording of "Every Time You Touch Me (I Get High)". New recordings included "She Calls Me Baby", "Let Your Fingers Do the Talking" and "Don't Take It Away". The latter would later be recorded and made a number one Billboard country song in 1979 by Conway Twitty.

== Release, critical reception and singles ==
Will You Love Tomorrow? was released in March 1976 by Epic Records. It was the twelfth studio album of Miller's career. Epic offered the disc as a vinyl LP, with five songs on either side of the album. The disc received positive reviews from magazines following its release. Billboard magazine named it among its "Recommended LP's" in March 1976, calling it a "classy collection of numbers". Cashbox magazine also gave the album positive reception in March 1976. "Jody proves her musical maturity with the following selections on this delightful LP," the magazine commented. Cashbox also praised Miller's vocal delivery, commenting, "Jody Miller shows her capability of conveying the emotional tinge the song requires. She has the singing ability to capture the flavor of any song."

A total of three singles were spawned from the Will You Love Me Tomorrow?. "Don't Take It Away" was the first single spawned and was issued by Epic in June 1975. It reached the number 67 position on America's Billboard Hot Country Songs chart later that year. It was followed by the title track in October 1975. It reached a similar Hot Country Songs position, peaking at number 69. Miller's cover of "Ashes of Love" was the final single released. Epic issued it in March 1976. It was the highest-charting Billboard country single from the album, peaking at number 48.

== Track listing ==
Side one
No.	Title	Writer(s)	Length
1.	"Will You Love Me Tomorrow?"	G. Goffin; C. King	2:38
2.	"Love, You Never Had It So Good"	G. Richey; C. Taylor; N. Wilson	2:48
3.	"A Thing Called Sadness"	C. Howard	2:32
4.	"The Man from Bowling Green"	M. D. Barnes; T. Seals	2:16
5.	"Don't Take It Away"	M. D. Barnes; T. Seals	3:39

Side two
No.	Title	Writer(s)	Length
1.	"She Calls Me 'Baby'"	B. Sherrill	2:51
2.	"Take Time to Know Him"	S. Davis	3:17
3.	"Let Your Fingers Do the Talking"	J. Foster; B. Rice	2:50
4.	"Every Time You Touch Me (I Get High)"	C. Rich; B. Sherrill	3:08
5.	"Ashes of Love"	J. Anglin; J. Anglin; J. Wright	2:42

== Technical personnel ==
All credits are adapted from the liner notes of Will You Love Me Tomorrow?

- Bill Barnes – Album design and cover photo
- Lou Bradley – Engineer
- Slick Lawson – Flyleaf photo
- Bill McElhiney – String arrangements
- The Nashville Edition – Background vocalists
- Billy Sherrill – Producer
- Bergen White – String arrangements

== Release history ==
Region	Date	Format	Label	Ref.
North America	March 1976	Vinyl LP	Epic Records	
