= Bad News =

Bad News may refer to:

== Books ==
- Bad News, a 1992 novel in the Patrick Melrose series by Edward St Aubyn
- Bad News: How Woke Media Is Undermining Democracy, a 2021 nonfiction book by Batya Ungar-Sargon

== Music ==
=== Albums ===
- Bad News (Bad News album) or the title song, 1987
- Bad News (Ligeia album) or the title song, 2008
- Bad News, by Butterfingers, 2020

=== Bands ===
- Bad News (band), an English spoof rock band

=== Songs ===
- "Bad News" (John D. Loudermilk song), 1963; covered by Johnny Cash (1964)
- "Bad News" (Kiss of Life song), 2023
- "Bad News" (Zach Bryan song), 2026
- "Bad News", by Bastille, the B-side of the single "Oblivion", 2014
- "Bad News", by Blink-182 from One More Time..., 2023
- "Bad News", by Camouflage from Spice Crackers, 1995
- "Bad News", by Ella Henderson from Everything I Didn't Say, 2022
- "Bad News", by Kanye West from 808s & Heartbreak, 2008
- "Bad News", by Kehlani from It Was Good Until It Wasn't, 2020
- "Bad News", by Moon Martin from Street Fever, 1980
- "Bad News", by the Kid Laroi from F*ck Love, 2021
- "Bad News", by Status Quo from In Search of the Fourth Chord, 2007
- "Bad News", by The Trashmen, 1964

== Film and television ==
- "Bad News" (How I Met Your Mother), a television episode of How I Met Your Mother
- "Bad News" (Patrick Melrose episode), of the television series based on the novels by Edward St Aubyn
- Bad Newz, a 2024 Indian Hindi-language film

== People ==
- Bad News Barrett, ring name of Wade Barrett (born 1980), English retired professional wrestler
- Bad News Brown, ring name of Allen Coage (1943–2007), American and Canadian judoka and professional wrestler (also known as Bad News Allen)
- Bad News Brown (musician) (1977–2011), Canadian musician, actor and harmonica player of Haitian origin

== Other uses ==
- Bad News, a 1980s comics magazine co-edited by Paul Karasik
- Bad News (video game), a 2018 free browser game
- Más Notícias ("Bad News" in Brazilian Portuguese), an 1895 painting by Rodolfo Amoedo

== See also ==
- Good news (disambiguation)
