= Take Time to Know Her (song) =

Single by Percy Sledge

from the album Take Time to Know Her
- B-side: "It's All Wrong But It's Alright"
- Released: February 1968
- Genre: Soul
- Length: 2:55
- Label: Atlantic
- Songwriter(s): Steve Davis
- Producer(s): Marlin Greene, Quin Ivy

Percy Sledge singles chronology
"Cover Me" (1967)	"Take Time to Know Her" (1968)	"Sudden Stop" (1968)

"Take Time to Know Her" is a song written by Steve Davis and performed by Percy Sledge. It reached #5 on the Canadian pop chart, #6 on the U.S. R&B chart, and #11 on the U.S. pop chart in 1968. It was featured on his 1968 album Take Time to Know Her.

The song was produced by Marlin Greene and Quin Ivy.

The song ranked #54 on Billboard magazine's Top 100 singles of 1968.

== Personnel ==
Credits are adapted from the liner notes of The Muscle Shoals Sound: 3614 Jackson Highway.

- Barry Beckett – piano
- Jerry Eddleman – backing vocals
- Jeanie Greene – backing vocals
- Roger Hawkins – drums
- Eddie Hinton – lead guitar
- David Hood – bass guitar
- Jimmy Johnson – rhythm guitar
- Spooner Oldham – organ
- Sandy Posey – backing vocals
- Percy Sledge – lead vocals
- Hershel Wiggington – backing vocals

== Other charting versions ==
- Joe Stampley released a version of the song as his debut single in 1971 which reached #74 on the U.S. Country chart.
- David Allan Coe released a version of the song as a single in 1982 which reached #58 on the U.S. Country chart.

== Other versions ==
- Ben Branch and Orchestra released a version of the song as the B-side to his 1968 single "The Big One".
- Davis released a version of the song as a single in 1968, but it did not chart.
- O.C. Smith released a version of the song on his 1968 album Hickory Holler Revisited.
- Tommie Young released a version of the song as a single in 1972, but it did not chart.
- Jody Miller released a version of the song on her 1976 album Will You Love Me Tomorrow.
- Harry Hippy released a version of the song on his 1977 album with Dennis Brown entitled Dennis Brown Meets Harry Hippy.
- John Hiatt released a version of the song as the B-side to his 1982 single "I Look for Love".
- John Mooney released a version of the song on his 1992 album Testimony.
- Zydeco Force released a version of the song on their 2001 album You Mean the World to Me.
