= Where's the Dress =

Single by Moe Bandy and Joe Stampley

from the album The Good Ol' Boys — Alive and Well
- B-side: "Wildlife Sanctuary"
- Released: May 7, 1984
- Genre: Country
- Length: 2:48
- Label: Columbia
- Songwriters: George Cummings; Bucky Lindsey; Tony Stampley
- Producer: Blake Mevis

Moe Bandy singles chronology
"It Took a Lot of Drinkin' (To Get That Woman Over Me)" (1984)	"Where's the Dress" (1984)	"Woman Your Love" (1984)

Joe Stampley singles chronology
"Memory Lane" (1984)	"Where's the Dress" (1984)	"The Boy's Night Out" (1984)

"Where's the Dress" is a song by American country music singers Moe Bandy and Joe Stampley. It was released in 1984 as a single from The Good Ol' Boys — Alive and Well, their collaborative album on Columbia Records. The song is a satire of Boy George and Culture Club.

== Content ==
"Where's the Dress" was the first collaborative effort between Moe Bandy and Joe Stampley since their 1981 album Hey Joe! Hey Moe!, which included the singles "Hey Joe (Hey Moe)" and "Honky Tonk Queen". The song is a parody of Culture Club and its lead singer Boy George's androgynous fashion styles, with the two singers pondering adopting a similar fashion sense in order to become more successful. Joe Stampley's son, Tony, is one of the song's co-writers, and Blake Mevis is the song's producer. To promote the song, Bandy and Stampley wore dresses and earrings when distributing the singles to radio stations; they dressed similarly on the cover of the single, as well as using a similar style to many of Culture Club's single covers.

While Boy George himself otherwise liked the song, he later sued Bandy and Stampley for incorporating the intro of "Karma Chameleon" into the song without his permission. The three parties later settled the matter out of court.

== Music video ==
The song also featured a music video, directed by Rod Thompson and produced by Jim Owens. In 1985, it won the award for Best Country Video at the American Video Awards. Similarly to the song's concept, the video features the two singers cross-dressing.

== Chart performance ==
Chart (1984)	Peak position
US Hot Country Songs (Billboard)	8
Canadian RPM Country Tracks	8
