= Here's Jody Miller =

Studio album by Jody Miller
- Released: March 1977
- Recorded: December 1976
- Studio: Soundshop
- Genre: Country
- Label: Epic
- Producer: Jerry Crutchfield

Jody Miller chronology
Will You Love Me Tomorrow? (1976)	Here's Jody Miller (1977)	My Country (1988)

Singles from Here's Jody Miller
- 1. "When the New Wears Off Our Love" Released: October 1976; 2. "Spread a Little Love Around" Released: March 1977

Here's Jody Miller is a studio album by American singer Jody Miller. It was released in March 1977 on Epic Records and featured ten tracks. The album included country material, two of which were singles. Its most successful was the top 25 American country chart record titled "When the New Wears Off Our Love". It was Miller's final album with the Epic label and her thirteenth album overall.

== Background, recording and content ==
Jody Miller had her most successful recording career as a country artist. In the early 1970s, she had top ten singles with "He's So Fine", "Baby I'm Yours", "There's a Party Goin' On", "Good News" and "Darling, You Can Always Come Back Home". Despite waning commercial success in the late 1970s, she continued recording for her label (Epic Records) until 1979. Her final Epic album was Here's Jody Miller. It was her first (and only) disc produced by Jerry Crutchfield. On her official website, Miller stated that Crutchfield was "a very nice person and a credit to the music business, and what a producer!"

Here's Jody Miller was recorded at Soundshop, a studio located in Nashville, Tennessee. Sessions were held in December 1976. The album consisted of ten tracks. It featured a cover of The Louvin Brothers's number one Billboard country single "I Don't Believe You've Met My Baby". Remaining songs were original material. This included a song penned by Jerry Crutchfield and singer-songwriter Bill Anderson called "You Can Be Replaced". According to the liner notes, "Spread a Little Love Around" was dedicated to "Perry Walker and all the love we had for him".

== Release, critical reception and singles ==
Here's Jody Miller was released in March 1977. It was issued by Epic Records as a vinyl LP featuring five songs on each side of the disc. It was her final Epic studio album and the thirteenth studio album of her career. It was reviewed positively by Cashbox magazine which called it "an album of the highest quality" and further commented that "Jody Miller's work gets stronger and stronger with each new release." Writers Mary A. Bufwack and Robert K. Oermann named it among her best studio albums and made comparisons to the 1970s LP's by Linda Ronstadt. AllMusic gave the album three out of five stars.

Two singles were included on Here's Jody Miller. The lead release was "When the New Wears Off Our Love". It was issued by Epic Records in October 1976. It was a Miller's highest-charting single in three years, reaching a peak of 25 on the American Billboard Hot Country Songs chart. "Spread a Little Love Around" was released as the second single in March 1977. However, it only reached the number 71 position on the Billboard country chart.

== Track listing ==
Side one
No.	Title	Writer(s)	Length
1.	"Roll Me on the Water"	B. Koloc	3:26
2.	"Try Me Again"	L. Martine Jr.	2:06
3.	"You Can Be Replaced"	B. Anderson; J. Crutchfield	3:13
4.	"Won't You Stay (Just a Little Bit Longer)"	O. Young	2:42
5.	"Maybe I Should've Been Listenin'"	B. Rabin	3:01

Side two
No.	Title	Writer(s)	Length
1.	"Montana Cowboy"	D. Pfeifer	2:32
2.	"Spread a Little Love Around"	R. Leigh	2:47
3.	"When the New Wears Off Our Love"	P. Craft	2:47
4.	"This Is Us"	J. Chesnut	2:36
5.	"I Don't Believe You've Met My Baby"	A. Inman	2:52

== Technical personnel ==
All credits are adapted from the liner notes of Here's Jody Miller

- Bill Barnes – Album design
- Lou Bradley – Recording and mixing
- Jerry Crutchfield – Producer
- Slick Lawson – Photography
- Cheryl Purdue – Album design
- Ernie Winfrey – Recording and mixing

== Release history ==
Region	Date	Format	Label	Ref.
North America	March 1977	Vinyl LP	Epic Records	
United Kingdom	March 1977	Vinyl LP	Epic Records	
