= Good News! =

Studio album by Jody Miller
- Released: July 1973
- Recorded: January–April 1973
- Studios: Columbia (Nashville, Tennessee)
- Genre: Country
- Label: Epic
- Producer: Billy Sherrill

Jody Miller chronology
There's a Party Goin' On (1972)	Good News! (1973)	House of the Rising Sun (1974)

Singles from Good News!
- 1. "Good News" Released: February 1973; 2. "Darling, You Can Always Come Back Home" Released: June 1973

Good News! is a studio album by American singer Jody Miller. It was released in July 1973 on Epic Records and featured 11 tracks. The ninth studio album of her career, Good News! was a country-themed album mixing cover tunes with original material. Among its original songs were the singles "Good News" and "Darling, You Can Always Come Back Home". Both singles reached the top ten of the North American country charts in 1973. The album itself reached the top 20 on the American country chart in 1973. It was followed by a positive review from Billboard the same year.

== Background, recording and content ==
Jody Miller had a commercial comeback in the early 1970s after focusing her career on country music. Singles like "He's So Fine" and "Baby I'm Yours" became top ten country songs and her commercial success continued through the early part of the decade. Among her most successful songs were the top ten recordings "Good News" and "Darling You Can Always Come Back Home". Both were featured on Miller's 1973 studio album, also titled Good News!. The project was recorded at the Columbia Studios, located in Nashville, Tennessee. Sessions were held between January and April 1973. Billy Sherrill served as the album's producer.

Good News! consisted of 11 tracks. Along with its two singles tracks such as "In the Name of Love", "The Woman in Me" and "One More Chance" were also original material. Remaining tracks were covers, many of which were country covers. This included Brenda Lee's top ten song "Nobody Wins", Joe Stampley's number one song "Soul Song" and Kris Kristofferson's number one song "Why Me". Of all the songs on the project, Miller later stated that her cover of "Why Me" was her favorite. Miller also covered the top ten pop singles "Hallelujah I Love Him So" and "The House of the Rising Sun".

== Release and critical reception ==
Good News! was originally released in July 1973 by Epic Records. It was Miller's ninth studio recording in her career. The label originally distributed it as a vinyl LP. Five songs were featured on "side A" and six songs were featured on "side B". It was later released for digital markets via Sony Music Entertainment. Good News! reached the number 18 position on the American Billboard Top Country Albums chart in 1973. It was Miller's fourth and final album to reached the country albums top 20. After its original release, the project was reviewed positively by Billboard magazine. The publication praised it as being "perhaps, one of the finest country albums ever cut". They further noted that "at least five" of its songs could be potential singles.

== Singles ==
Two singles were issued from Good News!. The first was its title track, which was originally released as a single in February 1973. It became her fifth top ten single on the Billboard Hot Country Songs, peaking at number nine. It also reached number nine on Canada's RPM Country Tracks chart in 1973. "Darling, You Can Always Come Back Home" was then issued as a single in June 1973. It became her sixth (and final) top ten single on the Billboard country chart, reaching number five in 1973. It reached number three on the RPM Country Songs chart.

== Track listing ==
Side one
No.	Title	Writer(s)	Length
1.	"Good News"	G. Richey; B. Sherrill; N. Wilson	2:15
2.	"Darling, You Can Always Come Back Home"	J. Foster; B. Rice	2:15
3.	"Why Me"	K. Kristofferson	3:03
4.	"Hallelujah I Love Him So"	R. Charles	2:30
5.	"The House of the Rising Sun"	A. Price	3:52

Side two
No.	Title	Writer(s)	Length
1.	"In the Name of Love"	E. Montgomery; G. Richey; C. Taylor	2:10
2.	"Nobody Wins"	K. Kristofferson	2:52
3.	"One More Chance"	B. Sherrill; G. Richey	2:36
4.	"The Woman in Me"	C. Montgomery; E. Montgomery	2:37
5.	"Soul Song"	G. Richey; B. Sherrill; N. Wilson	2:52
6.	"We'll Sing Our Song Together"	B. Sherrill	2:30

== Technical personnel ==
All credits are adapted from the liner notes of Good News!

- Bill Barnes – Art design
- Charlie Bragg – Engineer
- Lou Bradley – Engineer
- Al Clayton – Photography
- The Jordanaires – Background vocals
- Bill McElhiney – String arrangements
- The Nashville Edition – Background vocals
- Billy Sherrill – Producer

== Charts ==
Chart (1973)	Peak position
US Top Country Albums (Billboard)	18

== Release history ==
Region	Date	Format	Label	Ref.
North America	July 1973	Vinyl LP	Epic Records	
North America	circa 2020	Digital download; streaming	Sony Music Entertainment	
