= Tommie Young =

American singer

Tommie Young (born January 14, 1949) is an American soul and gospel singer from Dallas, Texas, United States.

Young started singing in Dallas nightclubs, and in 1972, producer Bobby Patterson heard one of her performances and signed her to the label he co-owned, Soul Power Records. For her debut single, Patterson recorded instrumental versions of the songs "That's How Strong My Love Is" (O.V. Wright) and "Take Time to Know Her" (Percy Sledge), and then had Young travel to his studios in Shreveport, Louisiana, where she finished the recording in one take per track. The single did not chart but since has become a cult favorite among soul music fans. Her follow-up single, "Do You Still Feel the Same Way" (written by Patterson and his label co-owner, Jerry Strickland) was a hit in the American South and charted No. 28 on the national Billboard R&B chart. An album by that name followed, as did several more singles, but Young had little interest in promotion, and Soul Power did not have the distribution capability to make her a star. Young soon returned to singing in the Dallas church at which her father was pastor. In 1978, her music was featured in a made-for-TV biopic of Harriet Tubman, A Woman Called Moses. After marrying she began performing as Tommye Young-West, and recorded several gospel albums.

In 1981, she was featured in the single "I'm Gonna See You Through" by The Pictures released on the Texas label Southwest on the lead vocals.

== Discography ==
- Do You Still Feel the Same Way? (1973)
- Just Call Me Tommye (1993)
- Believe (2000)
- Do You Still Feel the Same Way? ...Plus (2003) re-issue w/ bonus tracks

== Singles ==
- "That's How Strong My Love Is" b/w "Take Time to Know Her"
- "Do You Still Feel the Same Way"
- "You Brought it All On Yourself"
- "You Came Just in Time"
- "Get Out of My Life"
- "I'm Gonna See You Through"
- "Everybody's Got a Little Devil in Their Soul"
