= When the New Wears Off Our Love =

Single by Jody Miller

from the album Here's Jody Miller
- B-side: "Silver and Gold"
- Released: October 1976
- Recorded: 1976
- Studio: Soundshop
- Genre: Countrypolitan
- Length: 2:47
- Label: Epic
- Songwriter(s): Paul Craft
- Producer(s): Jerry Crutchfield

Jody Miller singles chronology
"Ashes of Love" (1976)	"When the New Wears Off Our Love" (1976)	"Spread a Little Love Around" (1977)

"When the New Wears Off Our Love" is a song written by Paul Craft that was originally recorded by American singer Jody Miller. It was released as a single on Epic Records in 1976. It was Miller's first top 40 entry on the American country music chart in three years and was her final to reach the top 40. It was later released on Miller's 1977 studio album Here's Jody Miller. The song was given positive reviews from publications following its release.

== Background and recording ==
Jody Miller had found success in multiple musical formats. In the 1970s she was recorded at Epic Records as a country music artist. During the early decade, she had several top ten singles including "He's So Fine" and "Darling, You Can Always Come Back Home". Miller's commercial momentum declined as the decade progressed. Nonetheless, she continued recording for Epic until 1979. Among her later singles for Epic was 1976's "When the New Wears Off Our Love". It was composed by songwriter Paul Craft. The song was produced by Jerry Crutchfield in 1976 at the Soundshop Studio located in Nashville, Tennessee.

== Release, chart performance and critical reception ==
"When the New Wears Off Our Love" was released as a single in the e by Epic Records in October 1976. It was backed on the B-side by a new recording called "Silver and Gold". It was distributed as a seven-inch vinyl single. It reached the number 25 position on the American Billboard Hot Country Songs chart in early 1977. It was Miller's first song to climb into the country top 40 since 1974's "House of the Rising Sun". It would also be Miller's final single to reach such a chart position. It was later included on Miller's final studio album for Epic Records titled Here's Jody Miller.

"When the New Wears Off Our Love" was given positive reviews by music publications following its release. Cashbox magazine called it Miller's "best single" in several years. They further commented, "It’s an upbeat, happy tune with an overlay of gospel accented by the prominent background vocals. Jerry Crutchfield's production shows off Jody’s energetic vocal." When reviewing the album Here's Jody Miller, Billboard magazine named "When the New Wears Off Our Love" among the disc's "best cuts".

== Track listing ==
7" vinyl single

- "When the New Wears Off Our Love" – 2:47
- "Silver and Gold" – 3:06

== Charts ==
=== Weekly charts ===
Weekly chart performance for "When the New Wears Off Our Love"
Chart (1976–1977)	Peak position
US Hot Country Songs (Billboard)	25
