= Tammie Shannon =

American singer-songwriter

- Born: June 13, 1969 (age 56); Arkansas
- Origin: Unknown
- Genres: Blues
- Occupation: Singer songwriter
- Years active: 1998–present
- Labels: None
- Website: tammieshannonmusic.com

Tammie Shannon (born June 13, 1969) is an American blues singer-songwriter best known for her track "I Got Rhythm." As a child, Tammie received early musical exposure touring with Percy Sledge before taking a break from the arts to focus on family and business. Tammie is based in Nashville, TN and has received media attention from Words Music and News, No Depression, Nashville Downtown, Now Playing Nashville, and Rock and Blues Muse.
