= Batya Ungar-Sargon =

American journalist and author (born 1981)

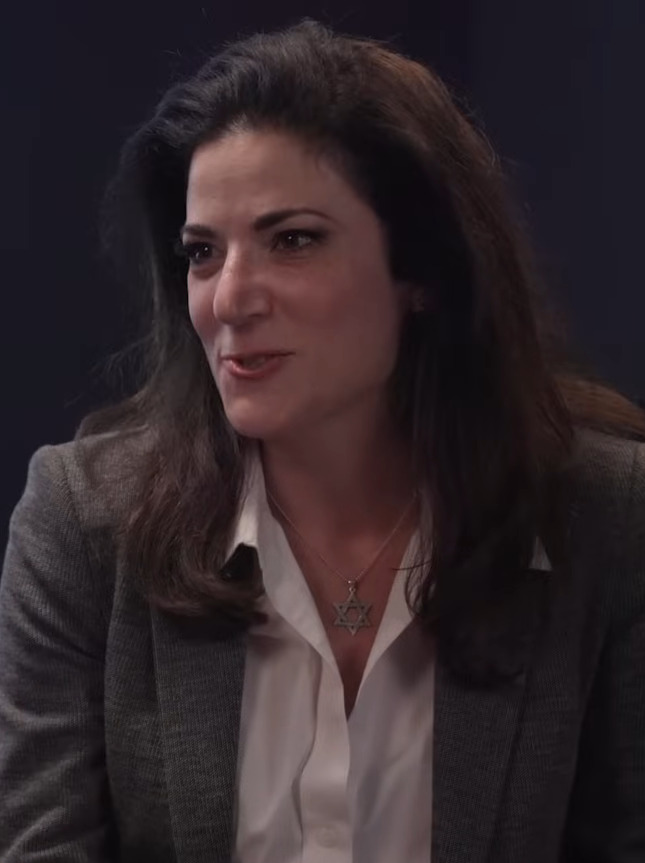
- Born: 1981 (age 44–45); Philadelphia, Pennsylvania, U.S.
- Education: University of Chicago (BA); University of California, Berkeley (MA, PhD)

Batya Ungar-Sargon is an American journalist and author who served as the opinion editor of The Forward and later worked as deputy opinion editor of Newsweek. She is the author of two books which address class consciousness and working class-related issues and one that deals with American Jews and the left.

== Early life ==
Ungar-Sargon was born in 1981 in Philadelphia. She confirmed this in an interview on a podcast hosted by Robert Bryce. Although she has also been reported to have been born in the Gaza Strip, she has clarified that this was inaccurate. Ungar-Sargon is of Jewish descent. She is the daughter of Julian Ungar-Sargon, a neurologist. She attended high school in Israel. She earned a Bachelor of Arts in English from the University of Chicago in 2004 and completed a Ph.D. in English at the University of California, Berkeley, in 2013. Her dissertation, titled Coercive Pleasures: The Force and Form of the Novel 1719–1740, examined among other elements how rape and colonialism contributed to the development of modern English fiction.

== Career ==
Ungar-Sargon began her career as a journalist and news analyst, reporting on topics such as the rights of undocumented immigrants and liberal perspectives on Israel and American Jews. In 2019, she discussed the significance of developing an American Jewish identity that is distinct from Israeli politics and aligned with civil and minority rights. She also served as managing editor at the wine and spirits media outlet VinePair.

In 2017, Ungar-Sargon became the opinion editor at The Forward. During her tenure, she faced criticism from some commentators on the political left, who accused her of weaponizing claims of antisemitism in a politically charged manner and of displaying a right-wing and Zionist editorial stance. Ungar-Sargon later contributed to various publications, including among others the Daily Beast, The Free Press, Foreign Policy, the Los Angeles Times, The New Republic, the New York Review of Books, the New York Times, Tablet, and the Washington Post. She also appeared on various political shows including on the Brian Lehrer Show, MSNBC, NBC, and NPR, among other media outlets. She later became deputy opinion editor of Newsweek, and co-host of the podcast The Debate.

In 2019, Ungar-Sargon publicly criticized U.S. Representative Ilhan Omar on Twitter, alleging that Omar had employed antisemitic tropes by suggesting that financial motivations underlie U.S. support for Israel. In response, Omar pointed to AIPAC's influence on politicians. The exchange drew criticism of Omar's comments, leading to a public apology from the congresswoman. In 2020, Ungar-Sargon was selected for the 2021 Civil Society Fellowship, a program of the Anti-Defamation League and the Aspen Institute. In 2021, Ungar-Sargon published Bad News: How Woke Media Is Undermining Democracy. The book argues that contemporary media has shifted focus away from working class "values and concerns", and towards issues of identity politics and the "culture war", which she contends caters primarily to affluent, educated, and urban audiences, stating "the majority of our mainstream news is no longer just liberal; it’s woke." In 2024, she published Second Class: How the Elites Betrayed America's Working Men and Women, in which she examines issues related to the working class in the United States and its relationship with the elite.

In the wake of the Elon Musk salute controversy in January 2025, Ungar-Sargon said it appeared to be "a man with Aspergers [sic] exuberantly throwing his heart to the crowd", accusing Musk's many critics who described it as a fascist salute (or Nazi salute) of "inventing outrage". On August 26, 2025, the NewsNation channel announced that Ungar-Sargon would host a weekend afternoon talk show titled Batya! on Saturdays, starting on September 20, at 4 p.m. ET.

== Political views ==
Ungar-Sargon has described a shift in her political views over time. In the 2010s, she identified as an American liberal; by the 2020s, she reported distancing herself from that ideology. In 2021, Bari Weiss characterized Ungar-Sargon as a left-wing populist. Ungar-Sargon later adopted this label herself in 2023, although several observers view her as echoing American conservative viewpoints. She attributed this perception to her focus on social class, which she argued has been deprioritized by the American Left and adopted by elements of the American right. In a June 2022 interview with Dennis Prager, Ungar-Sargon described herself as a Marxist, and her views have been described as providing "right-wing Marxist" interpretations. In February 2023, she argued that "caring about class is now a right-wing position, and that being on the left no longer means caring about class".

In an April 2024 interview with Newsweek, Ungar-Sargon expressed support for limiting immigration to the United States, reducing welfare fraud, expanding vocational training, implementing a government-backed health care plan, eliminating degree requirements for jobs that do not necessitate them, banning software that filters applicants based on educational credentials, reforming zoning laws to increase urban density, expanding the child tax credit, and expanding tariffs on foreign goods.

=== Trumpism ===
In November 2024, Ungar-Sargon publicly encouraged American Jews to vote for Donald Trump in the 2024 U.S. presidential election. Diverging from the common classification of Trump as part of a right-wing populist and illiberal wave, Ungar-Sargon argued that Trump is not a radical or extremist but rather a centrist, who held similar positions to that of Democrats in the 1990s, and stated that "to Trump supporters, he is a liberal". In response, Cathy Young observed that the 1990s Democrats, even accounting for the shift to the centre as New Democrats under Bill Clinton, were still much more pro-abortion rights and pro-immigration than Trump.

In March 2025, Ungar-Sargon introduced herself to HBO's Real Time with Bill Maher as a "MAGA leftist". When asked whether she had second thoughts, she said "I feel the opposite", arguing that Trump "took a Republican Party that was built on social conservatism, foreign interventions and wars, and free trade and free markets, and he basically took an ax to all of those". She further claimed that Trump departed from traditional conservatism when he appointed Scott Bessent as U.S. Secretary of Treasury and that he "sidelined the pro-life wing of his party", adding: "That agenda that he laid out is socially moderate, antiwar, and anti–free trade, protectionist. That is a leftist position!" Various commentators, including among others Jonathan Chait, Kyle Kulinski, Nathan J. Robinson, and Nate Weisberg, responded by arguing that Ungar-Sargon's portrayal of Trump as a working-class advocate is incorrect and misleading because Trump's rhetoric on policy rarely matches his actions, that there is no such thing as a "MAGA lefty" and that Trump is "much, much worse" than centrist Democrats, and that the second Trump administration's actions have been anti-worker.

=== Environmentalism and green politics ===
Ungar-Sargon has expressed criticism of environmental and green politics, asserting that such movements often reflect elite priorities and neglect the interests of working-class communities. She argues that progressive opposition to environmentally harmful industries like coal mining often overlook economic benefits these jobs provide to workers. She has criticized politicians who advocate green policies for engaging in environmentally harmful practices such as flying in private jets. She has also criticized the outsourcing of labor and environmental harm to countries like China.

=== Foreign policy ===
Since 2022, Ungar-Sargon has written articles opposing U.S. support for Ukraine following the Russian invasion. She has argued that American resources should prioritize domestic needs, questioned the strategic importance of Ukraine's territorial integrity, legitimized Russian land claims regarding Donetsk and Luhansk, and expressed skepticism toward U.S. foreign policy, which she views as exacerbating international conflicts. In response, journalist James Kirchick of The Atlantic criticized her stance, characterizing it as part of what he called the "Intellectually Bankrupt Anti-war camp" and accusing her of minimizing Russian imperialism. In 2024, Ungar-Sargon stated that the typical Republican voter is working class and rejects previously prominent party policies such as tax cuts for the wealthy and foreign military interventions. She argued that this sentiment underlies opposition to Trump from some within the Democratic Party. In March 2024, Ungar-Sargon criticized elements of the political left in the aftermath of the October 7 attacks. She claimed that left-wing discourse often centers on portraying groups as marginalized as a means of asserting influence and silencing dissent.

== Works ==
- Ungar-Sargon, Batya (Fall 2013). Coercive Pleasures: The Force and Form of the Novel 1719–1740 (PhD dissertation). University of California, Berkeley.
- Ungar-Sargon, Batya (2021). Bad News: How Woke Media Is Undermining Democracy. New York City: Encounter Books. ISBN 978-1641772068.
- Ungar-Sargon, Batya (2024). Second Class: How the Elites Betrayed America's Working Men and Women. New York City: Encounter Books. ISBN 978-1641773614.
- Ungar-Sargon, Batya (2026). The Jews and the Left. New York: Broadside Books. ISBN 978-0063460607.
