= Just Good Ol' Boys (album) =

Studio album by Moe Bandy & Joe Stampley
- Released: 1979
- Genre: Country
- Length: 25:15
- Label: Columbia
- Producer: Ray Baker

Moe Bandy & Joe Stampley chronology
Just Good Ol' Boys (1979)	Hey Joe! Hey Moe! (1981)

Professional ratings
Review scores
Source	Rating
Christgau's Record Guide	B

Just Good Ol' Boys is the first album by country music duo Moe Bandy and Joe Stampley, released in 1979 on the Columbia label recorded at the CBS Recording Studios, Nashville, Tennessee and Jack Clements Recording Studio, Tennessee.

== Track listing ==
1. "Just Good Ol' Boys" (Ansley Fleetwood) - 2:38
2. "Make a Little Love Each Day" (Buck Moore) - 2:32
3. "Tell Ole I Ain't Here, He Better Get on Home" (Wayne Kemp) - 2:18
4. "Honky Tonk Man" (Johnny Horton, Tillman Franks, Howard Hausey) - 2:04
5. "Partners in Rhyme" (Bobby Fischer) - 2:36
6. "Holding the Bag" (Pat Bunch) - 2:34
7. "Bye Bye Love" (Boudleaux Bryant, Felice Bryant) - 2:27
8. "Only the Names Have Been Changed" (Harlan Howard, Doris Schaef) - 2:42
9. "When It Comes to Cowgirls (We Just Can't Say No)" (Jerry Abbott, Patty Jackson) - 2:10
10. "Thank Goodness It's Friday" (Ansley Fleetwood) - 2:24

== Musicians ==
- Bob Moore
- Johnny Gimble
- Chip Young
- Tommy Allsup
- Hargus "Pig" Robbins
- Jimmy Capps
- Leo Jackson
- Weldon Myrick
- Kenny Malone
- Charlie McCoy
- Billy Sanford
- Hayward Bishop
- Terry McMillan
- Buddy Emmons
- Phil Baugh

== Backing ==
The Jordanaires with Laverna Moore.

== Production ==
- Sound engineers - Billy Sherrill & Ron Reynolds
- Photography - Larry Dixon & Chip DeVilbiss
- Design - Bill Johnson
- Art direction - Virginia Team

== Charts ==
Chart performance for Just Good Ol' Boys
Chart (1979)	Peak position
US Top Country Albums (Billboard)	11
