= Hey Joe! Hey Moe! =

Studio album by Moe Bandy & Joe Stampley
- Released: 1981
- Studio: Sound Emporium (Nashville, Tennessee)
- Genre: Country
- Length: 25:22
- Label: Columbia
- Producer: Ray Baker

Moe Bandy & Joe Stampley chronology
Just Good Ol' Boys (1979)	Hey Joe! Hey Moe! (1981)	Greatest Hits (1982)

Hey Joe! Hey Moe! is an album by country singers Moe Bandy and Joe Stampley, released in 1981 on the Columbia label recorded and mastered at the CBS Recording Studios, Nashville, Tennessee.

== Track listing ==
1. "Honky Tonk Queen" (Robbie Lee Hicks) - 2:40
2. "The Girl Don't Ever Get Lonely" (Bobby Fischer, Christopher "Sky Juice" Blake) - 2:30
3. "I'd Rather Be A-Pickin'" (Dan Darst) - 2:14
4. "Drinkin', Dancin'" (Warren Robb, Shirl Milete) - 2:08
5. "Drunk Front" (Paul Craft, Tim Krekel) - 2:26
6. "Hey Joe (Hey Moe)" (Boudleaux Bryant) - 2:16
7. "Country Boys" (Warren Robb, Dave Kirby) - 2:16
8. "Let's Hear It For The Workin' Man" (Max D. Barnes) - 2:11
9. "Get Off My Case" (Dan Mitchell) - 2:38
10. "Two Beers Away" (Johnny Gimble) - 2:21

== Musicians ==
- Hargus "Pig" Robbins
- Leo Jackson
- Weldon Myrick
- Johnny Gimble
- Henry Strzelecki
- Charlie McCoy
- Jerry Carrigan
- Dave Kirby
- Ray Edenton
- Ray Norman
- John Komrada
- Wayne Harrison
- Pete Wade
- Mike Leech

== Backing ==
The Jordanaires with Laverna Moore.

== Production ==
- Sound engineers - Billy Sherrill at Sound Emporium, Lou Bradley, Ron Reynolds
- Photography - Larry Dixon

== Charts ==
Chart performance for Hey Joe! Hey Moe!
Chart (1981)	Peak position
US Billboard 200	170
US Top Country Albums (Billboard)	23
