= Blue Night (Percy Sledge album) =

Studio album by Percy Sledge
- Released: 1994, France; 1995, United States
- Recorded: March 1994
- Studio: Cherokee (Hollywood)
- Genre: Soul, R&B
- Label: Sky Ranch; Pointblank/Virgin
- Producer: Barry Goldberg, Saul Davis

Percy Sledge chronology
It Tears Me Up: The Best of Percy Sledge (1992)	Blue Night (1994)	Shining Through the Rain (2004)

Blue Night is an album by the American musician singer Percy Sledge, released in 1994. Sledge considered it his first album since the early 1970s.

The album was nominated for a Grammy Award for "Best Contemporary Blues Album".

== Production ==
Recorded in Los Angeles in March 1994, the album was produced by Barry Goldberg and Saul Davis. Steve Cropper, Bobby Womack, and Mick Taylor contributed guitar parts to the album.

Blue Night's liner notes were penned by Jerry Wexler.

== Critical reception ==
Professional ratings
Review scores
Source	Rating
AllMusic	3/5 stars
The Encyclopedia of Popular Music	4/5 stars
The Indianapolis Star	4/4 stars
MusicHound R&B: The Essential Album Guide	4/5 stars
USA Today	3.5/4 stars

The Ottawa Citizen thought that Sledge's "story songs are told from an adult perspective, unflinching and real as rain." USA Today wrote that Sledge breathes "emotional fire into the Temptations' 'I Wish It Would Rain', Otis Redding's 'I've Got Dreams to Remember' and James Carr's 'These Ain't Raindrops'." Marc D. Allan, of The Indianapolis Star, considered the album "easily the best record I've heard this year," writing that "the music is live and passionate, with a minimum of strings and clutter in the arrangements but enough horns and female backing vocals to punctuate the lyrics."

The Guardian noted that "Steve Cropper leads the simpatico, understated accompaniment to complete a polished update of steamy, old-style southern soul." The Vancouver Sun determined that Blue Night "might be better considered as urban blues than soul/R&B." The Irish Times wrote: "Gravelled by age and experience, this guy just breathes in the direction of lyrics and potential sap turns to music poetry of the most potent kind."

In a retrospective article, Rolling Stone praised Sledge's cover of Fats Domino's "Goin' Home", writing that, "goosed along by slide guitar from former Rolling Stone Mick Taylor, [it] shows that if Sledge wanted to, he could've rocked as hard as any other Louisiana R&B singer." MusicHound R&B: The Essential Album Guide called Sledge "emotionally centered and nothing less than inspiring."

== Track listing ==
No.	Title	Writer(s)	Length
1.	"You Got Away with Love"	Pat Robinson, Rocky Burnette	4:15
2.	"Love Comes Knockin'"	David Malloy, Gregg Sutton	3:42
3.	"Why Did You Stop"	Carla Olson	4:40
4.	"I Wish It Would Rain"	Barrett Strong, Norman Whitfield, Roger Penzabene	3:12
5.	"Blue Night"	Hasse Huss, Mikael Rickfors	4:48
6.	"These Ain't Raindrops"	Quinton Claunch	2:48
7.	"Your Love Will Save the World"	Barry Gibb, Robin Gibb	3:47
8.	"First You Cry"	Buddy Flett, David Egan	3:56
9.	"Going Home Tomorrow"	Alvin E. Young, Antoine Domino
10.	"The Grand Blvd."	Carla Olson, George Green	5:40
11.	"I've Got Dreams to Remember"	Joe Rock, Otis Redding, Zelma Redding	4:09
