= Take Time to Know Her =

Studio album by Percy Sledge
- Released: May 1968
- Length: 34:42
- Label: Atlantic
- Producer: Marlin Greene, Quin Ivy

Percy Sledge chronology
The Percy Sledge Way (1966)	Take Time to Know Her (1968)	My Special Prayer (1969)

Take Time to Know Her is an album by Percy Sledge. It was originally released on Atlantic Records in 1968. It was re-released in 1998 on CD. Three singles from the album placed on the Billboard charts, with the title track reaching number 11.

== Track listing ==
A Side

1. "Take Time to Know Her" (Steve Davis) 2:55
2. "Feed The Flame" (Dan Penn, Spooner Oldham) 2:20
3. "Sudden Stop" (Bobby Russell) 2:45
4. "Come Softly To Me" (Barbara Ellis, Gary Troxel, Gretchen Christopher) 2:55
5. "Spooky" (Buddy Buie, Harry Middlebrooks, J. R. Cobb, Mike Sharpe) 2:50
6. Out of Left Field" (Dan Penn, Spooner Oldham) 3:09

B Side

1. "Cover Me" (Eddie Hinton, Marlin Greene) 2:56
2. "Baby Help Me" (Bobby Womack) 2:30
3. "It's All Wrong But It's Alright" (Eddie Hinton, Marlin Greene) 2:53
4. "High Cost of Leaving" (David Briggs, Donald Fritts) 3:00
5. "Between These Arms" (Howard Evans, William Jenkins) 2:40
6. "I Love Everything About You" (Dan Penn, Spooner Oldham) 2:15

== Personnel ==
- Marlin Greene, Quin Ivy - production, recording engineers
- Enoch Gregory - liner notes
- Loring Eutemey - cover design
- Joel Brodsky - cover photography

== Singles ==
- "Cover Me" / "Behind Every Great Man There Is A Woman" (Released November 1967, reached number 42)
- "Take Time to Know Her" / "It's All Wrong But It's Alright" (Released April 1968, reached number 11)
- "Sudden Stop" / "Between These Arms" (Released July 1968, reached number 63)
