= Two Shots =

Studio album by Matt Dusk
- Released: June 15, 2004
- Recorded: 2002–2003; Toronto, Ontario, Canada and London, England
- Genre: Jazz
- Length: 55:05
- Label: Decca
- Producer: Robin Smith; Nigel Lowis; Cliff Masterson; Steve Anderson; Terry Sawchuk

Matt Dusk chronology
Two Shots (2004)	Peace on Earth (2004)

Two Shots is the second studio album by Canadian jazz singer Matt Dusk. It was released globally by Decca Records on June 15, 2004. The album was primarily produced by Robin Smith, Nigel Lowis, and Terry Sawchuk. Two Shots was very successful in Canada, where it was certified gold. It also was released with modest success in the United States, reaching number ten on the Billboard Top Contemporary Jazz albums chart.

== Critical reception ==
Professional ratings
Review scores
Source	Rating
AllMusic	2.5/5 stars

Aaron Latham of AllMusic gave praise to Dusk's Rat Pack homage on the opening track, "The Theme From Loaded Gun" and "Five" but felt he relied too much on it to form his own musical identity and didn't give the rest of the track listing "an indelible impression", concluding that "this does not mean that Two Shots is not worthy of a listen as it is a quality debut that will appeal to anyone who enjoys pop standards. But if he can sift out the ghosts of the past and find his own voice in these songs, he has the chance to create a disc that truly showcases the unique talent of Matt Dusk."

== Track listing ==
Two Shots track listing
No.	Title	Writer(s)	Length
1.	"Two Shots of Happy, One Shot of Sad"	Bono; The Edge	4:29
2.	"Miracle"	Wayne Hector; Robin Smith	3:35
3.	"Cold as Ice"	Hector; Smith	4:05
4.	"Lonely Road"	Hector; Smith	5:32
5.	"The Theme From Loaded Gun"	Steve Lee; Nigel Lowis; Matt Dusk	3:43
6.	"Don't Go Looking"	Steve Anderson; Tom Nichols	4:00
7.	"Fly Me to the Moon"	Bart Howard	2:50
8.	"Please Please Me" (Ash Howes Mix)	John Lennon; Paul McCartney	3:32
9.	"Precious Years"	Smith; Mark Niedzwiedz	4:15
10.	"Always"	Terry Sawchuk; Ron Lopata; Erica Ehm; Dusk	5:43
11.	"Every Mother's Son"	Smith; Niedzwiedz	4:03
12.	"Five"	Sawchuk; Dusk	4:47

Bonus track
No.	Title	Writer(s)	Length
13.	"Two Shots of Happy, One Shot of Sad" (Hot Nugget Remix)	Bono; The Edge	4:40

== Charts ==
Chart performance for Two Shots
Chart (2004–2005)	Peak position
Canadian Albums (Nielsen SoundScan)	19
Dutch Albums (Album Top 100)	37
US Top Contemporary Jazz Albums (Billboard)	10
US Top Jazz Albums (Billboard)	15
