= Matt Dusk =

Canadian jazz vocalist

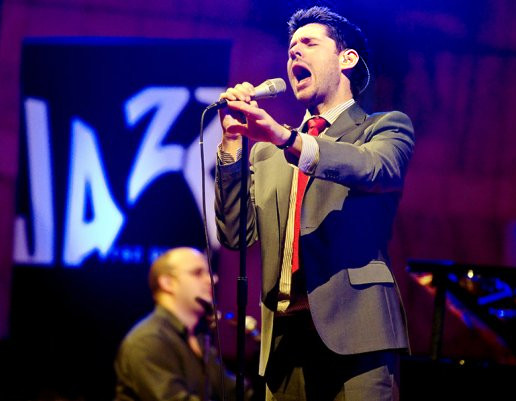
- Dusk in concert in July 2010

Background information
- Born: Matthew-Aaron Dusk; Toronto, Ontario, Canada
- Genre: Jazz
- Years active: 1999–present
- Label: Entertainment One/Universal
- Website: mattdusk.com

Matthew-Aaron Dusk is a Canadian jazz vocalist. He has four certified gold albums: Two Shots, Good News, Old School Yule! and JetSetJazz, and two certified platinum albums; My Funny Valentine: The Chet Baker Songbook and Just the Two of Us (with Margaret).

== Life and career ==
Matthew-Aaron Dusk was born in Toronto, Ontario, Canada. From an early age, he wanted to become a performer. At the age of seven, he was accepted into St. Michael's Choir School, where he remained for eleven years. He performed opera and classical music but after hearing Tony Bennett, Bob Fenton, and Sarah Vaughan when he was seventeen he began to change his musical direction. In 1998, he won the Canadian National Exhibition Rising Star Competition. He intended to take over the family business, and in 1998 he went to York University in Toronto to study economics. After one year, he decided to switch to music. He studied jazz theory with John Gittins, jazz vocal with Bob Fenton, and attended master classes taught by Oscar Peterson. He was awarded the Oscar Peterson Scholarship and graduated in 2002.

Before Dusk secured a record deal, he recorded four albums independently. In March 2003, he signed a deal with Decca. In 2004 he was invited to the Golden Nugget Casino in Las Vegas to perform as in-house entertainer for the filming of the television show The Casino.

His debut album, Two Shots, was released on June 5, 2004, and was certified gold in Canada. The album produced the hit single "Two Shots of Happy, One Shot of Sad", which was written by Bono and The Edge of the rock band U2. This song was the theme for The Casino. Dusk followed up his debut album with a holiday EP entitled Peace on Earth which was released on November 30, 2005.

In January 2006, Dusk traveled to Los Angeles to record his second album, Back in Town at Capitol Studio A. He recorded with a 58 piece orchestra conducted by Patrick Williams and Sammy Nestico and recorded by Al Schmitt. Back in Town includes a mix of jazz standards and originals and was released in June 2006.

Good News was released on October 27, 2009, in Poland and Canada. The album paid tribute to the crooner style but was produced in a contemporary style. In late 2009, Good News was certified gold in Poland.

In March 2010, Dusk recorded the soundtrack to the TV series Call Me Fitz. On August 25, 2010, Dusk recorded a live DVD concert special for PBS which aired in America in December 2010 and across the world in 2011. The concert was recorded live at the Rio All Suite Hotel and Casino in Las Vegas with a 17 piece big band.

In 2013 Dusk returned to his jazz roots and released his My Funny Valentine: The Chet Baker Songbook. It included an eighty piece orchestra and guests such as Arturo Sandoval, Guido Basso, Emilie-Claire Barlow, and Ryan Ahlwardt of the American a cappella band Straight No Chaser . The album paid homage to Chet Baker. On October 10, 2013, the album was certified gold in Poland. On December 17, 2013, the album achieved platinum status (also in Poland). In 2013 Dusk recorded a duet with Edyta Górniak. Additionally in 2013, Dusk performed songs for the Daniel Tiger's Neighborhood special "Snowflake Day", including a version of the show's opening tune, based on the theme for Mister Rogers' Neighborhood and the songs "The Snowflake Day Song", "Let Your Light Twinkle" and "It's Such a Good Feeling".

In 2014 Dusk began work on his ninth studio album, a duet album. Produced by Dusk, it featured a jazz sextet and string orchestra. Musically the album pays homage to the bossa nova genre, with songs by Antonio Carlos Jobim. The album was recorded and released in 2015 and 2016 three times with different duet partners. In Canada, the album is called Quiet Nights with French-Canadian singer Florence K and was number one on the Canadian Jazz charts for 16 weeks. It was nominated for an ADSIQ. In Poland, the album is called Just the Two of Us with Polish singer Margaret, was certified platinum and won a Roze Gali award. In Japan, the album is called Lost in Rio with Japanese singer Karen Aoki.

In 2016 Dusk self-produced his first full-length Christmas album, Old School Yule!. The album included over 100 musicians and the St. Michael's Choir School, his childhood school. The album was certified gold by ZPAV.

In 2018 Dusk released his twelfth studio album, JetSetJazz. The album was co-written, recorded and produced by Dusk and pays homage to the golden age of travel throughout the 1960s.

In 2020 Dusk released Sinatra with Matt Dusk and followed it in 2021 with Sinatra with Matt Dusk Vol. 2. The albums were certified platinum and gold by ZPAV, respectively.

Dusk returned to the spotlight in 2026, after beginning to release 1960s-style jazz versions of songs requested by his TikTok followers. Viral requests included Vocaloid tracks ("Looping The Rooms" and "Mesmerizer"), songs from "The Amazing Digital Circus", and "Charlie's Inferno" by American rock band That Handsome Devil and theme songs of indie video games, such as Five Nights at Freddy's and Deltarune.

== Discography ==
=== Albums ===
List of albums, with selected details, chart positions and certifications
Title	Album details	Peak chart positions						Certifications
Title	Album details	CAN	FRA	NLD	POL	US Cont. Jazz	US Jazz	Certifications
Live in Concert	Released 1999; Label: Royal Crown Records; Format: CD (demo reel)							
The Way It Is	Released: June 4, 2001; Label: Royal Crown Records; Formats: CD, digital download	—	—	—	—	—	—	
Two Shots	Released: June 15, 2004; Label: Decca Records; Formats: CD, digital download	19	—	37	—	10	15	MC: Gold
Peace on Earth	Released: November 30, 2004; Label: Decca Records; Formats: CD, digital download	81	—	—	—	—	—	
Back in Town	Released: June 13, 2006; Label: Decca Records; Formats: CD, digital download	17	—	38	—	7	16	
Good News	Released: October 27, 2009; Label: Royal Crown Records; Formats: CD, digital download	41	187	92	39	—	—	ZPAV: Gold
Live from Las Vegas	Released: May 10, 2011; Label: Royal Crown Records; Formats: CD, digital download	—	—	—	—	—	—	
My Funny Valentine: The Chet Baker Songbook	Released: February 12, 2013; Label: Royal Crown Records; Formats: CD, digital download	—	—	—	26	—	—	ZPAV: Platinum
Lost in Rio	Released: October 14, 2015; Label: Rambling Records; Formats: CD, digital download	---	---	---	---	---	---	
Just the Two of Us (with Margaret)	Released: November 6, 2015; Label: Magic, Universal Music Poland; Formats: CD, digital download	—	—	—	28	—	—	ZPAV: Platinum
Quiet Nights (with Florence K)	Released February 12, 2016; Label: Productions J Inc.; Format: CD, digital download	1	---	----	---	---	---	#1 on Canadian Jazz Charts (16 weeks); ADSIQ nomination
Old School Yule!	Released 2016; Label: Royal Crown Records, Magic Records; Format: Vinyl LP, CD, digital download	---	---	---	---	---	---	ZPAV: Gold
JetSetJazz	Released 2018; Label: Royal Crown Records (Canada), Magic Records (Poland); Format: Vinyl LP, CD, digital download	---	---	---	---	---	---	
Sinatra with Matt Dusk	Released 2020; Label: Agora Muzyka (Poland); Format: CD, digital download	---	---	---	---	---	---	ZPAV: Platinum
Sinatra with Matt Dusk Vol. 2	Released 2021; Label: Agora Muzyka (Poland); Format: CD, digital download	---	---	---	---	---	---	ZPAV: Gold
Umbra	Released 2026; Label: Royal Crown Records; Format: CD, digital download	---	---	---	---	---	---	
"—" denotes a recording that did not chart or was not released in that territory.

== See also ==
- List of jazz musicians
- List of Canadian musicians

== Sources ==
- All Music Biography - last accessed on July 16, 2011
