= The Good Ol' Boys — Alive and Well =

The Good Ol' Boys — Alive & Well

Studio album by Moe Bandy & Joe Stampley
- Released: 1984
- Genre: Country
- Label: Columbia
- Producer: Blake Mevis

Moe Bandy & Joe Stampley chronology
Greatest Hits (1982)	The Good Ol' Boys — Alive & Well (1984)	Live from Bobs, Memphis (1985)

Singles from The Good Ol' Boys - Alive & Well
- 1. "Where's the Dress" Released: June 1984; 2. "The Boy's Night Out" Released: September 1984; 3. "Daddy's Honky Tonk" Released: January 1985; 4. "Still on a Roll" Released: March 1985

The Good Ol Boys - Alive & Well is an album by American country singers Moe Bandy and Joe Stampley, released in 1984 on Columbia Records. Included on the album is the duo's single "Where's the Dress", a satire of the pop band Culture Club.

== Track listing ==
1. "Where's the Dress" (T. Stampley/B. Lindsey/G. Cummings) - 2:50
  - style parody of "Karma Chameleon" by Culture Club
2. "He's Back in Texas" (T. Seals/W. Newton) - 2:27
3. "Honky Tonk Money" (M. Garvin/R. Hellard/B. Jones) - 2:30
4. "Wild and Crazy Guys" (B. Lindsey/J. Carter/O. J. Christopher) - 2:39
5. "We've Got Our Moe-Joe Working" (P. Foster) - 2:56
6. "The Boy's Night Out" (J. Stampley/T. Stampley/D. Rosson) - 2:42
7. "Daddy's Honky Tonk" (B. Keel/B. Moore) - 2:34
8. "Wildlife Sanctuary" (B. Gallimore/B. Mevis/B. Shore/D. Wills) - 2:16
9. "Alive and Well" (T. Stampley/D. Rosson/S. McComb) - 2:16
10. "Still on a Roll" (J. Greenbaum/B. Hobbs/B. Mevis) - 2:56

== Musicians ==
- Sonny Garrish - Steel guitar
- Fred Newell - Lead guitar
- Brent Rowan - Lead guitar
- Bobby Thompson - Rhythm guitar
- Chip Young - Rhythm guitar
- Larry Paxton - Bass guitar
- Bob Wray - Bass guitar
- Curtis Young - Backing vocals
- Gary Prim - Keyboards
- Bobby Ogdin - Keyboards
- Jerry Kroon - Drums
- Rob Hajacos - Fiddle
- Terry McMillan - Harmonica

Personnel

- Bill Harris - Engineer
- Doug Crider - Assistant engineer
- Mark Tucker - Photography
- Bill Johnson & Jeff Morris - Art direction

== Charts ==
Chart performance for The Good Ol' Boys — Alive and Well
Chart (1984)	Peak position
US Top Country Albums (Billboard)	21
