= Back in Town (Matt Dusk album) =

Studio album by Matt Dusk
- Released: 2006
- Studios: Capitol (Hollywood); The Village (Los Angeles); Emerald & Blackbird (Nashville); I.T. (Nashville)
- Genre: Vocal jazz
- Length: 45:18
- Label: Decca
- Producers: Terry Sawchuk, Matt Dusk

Matt Dusk chronology
Peace on Earth (2004)	Back in Town (2006)	Good News (2009)

Back in Town is an album by singer Matt Dusk that was released by Decca in 2006.

== Track listing ==
No.	Title	Writer(s)	Length
1.	"Back in Town"	Olen Cesari; Enrico Giaretta; Matthew Marston; Terry Sawchuk; Matt Dusk	3:38
2.	"All About Me"	Marston; Rob Wells	3:34
3.	"The Best Is Yet to Come"	Carolyn Leigh; Cy Coleman	3:06
4.	"More"	Marcello Ciorciolini; Norman Prs Newell; Nino Oliviero; Riziero Ortolani	4:10
5.	"As Time Goes By"	Herman Hupfeld	4:50
6.	"Learnin' the Blues"	Delores Vicki Silvers	4:05
7.	"A Million Kisses Late"	Tom Douglas; Stan Lynch	3:57
8.	"Where Were You When"	Sawchuk	4:03
9.	"Get Me to the Church on Time"	Alan Jay Lerner; Frederick Loewe	3:18
10.	"Who's Got the Action"	Jack Brooks; George W. Duning	2:55
11.	"On the Street Where You Live"	Lerner; Loewe	3:39
12.	"April Moon"	Bobby Caldwell	4:10

Bonus tracks

- "The Way You Look Tonight"
- "Besame Mucho"
- "History Repeating"

== Personnel ==
Credits adapted from the Back in Town liner notes.

Musicians

- Matt Dusk – vocals (all tracks)
- John Chiodini – guitar (3–6, 9–12)
- John Faux – guitar (4)
- Ilya Toshinski – guitar (2, 8), banjo (1)
- Chuck Berghofer – acoustic bass (3–6, 9–12)
- Spencer Campbell – electric bass (2)
- Neil Stubenhaus – electric bass (1, 7, 8)
- Vinnie Colaiuta – drums (1, 3–13)
- Shannon Forrest – drums (2)
- Paulinho da Costa – percussion (1, 4, 5, 7, 9)
- Dan Greco – percussion (1, 4, 5, 7, 9)
- Eric Darken – percussion (2)
- Tom Ranier – piano (3, 5, 6, 9–11)
- Randy Kerber – piano (1, 7, 8)
- Mike Lang – piano (4, 12), celeste (9)
- Rob Wells – programming, keyboards (2)
- "Big" Jim Right – B3 organ (1, 8)

Technical

- Al Schmitt – mixing (3–12)
- Chris Lord-Alge – mixing (1, 2)
- Terry Sawchuk – mixing (13)
- Doug Sax – mastering

Imagery

- Garnet Armstrong – art direction, design
- Linda Philp – design
- Mitch Jenkins – photography
- Damon Allan – styling, custom clothing

== Charts ==
Chart performance for Back in Town
Chart (2006–2007)	Peak position
Canadian Albums (Nielsen SoundScan)	17
Dutch Albums (Album Top 100)	38
US Top Contemporary Jazz Albums (Billboard)	7
US Top Jazz Albums (Billboard)	16
