= Good News (Jody Miller song) =

Single by Jody Miller

from the album Good News!
- B-side: "Soul Song"
- Released: February 1973
- Recorded: January 1973
- Studio: Columbia, Nashville, Tennessee
- Genre: Countrypolitan
- Length: 2:30
- Label: Epic
- Songwriters: George Richey; Billy Sherrill; Norro Wilson
- Producer: Billy Sherrill

Jody Miller singles chronology
"To Know Him Is to Love Him" (1972)	"Good News" (1973)	"Darling, You Can Always Come Back Home" (1973)

"Good News" is a song originally recorded by American singer Jody Miller. It was composed by George Richey, Billy Sherrill and Norro Wilson. It was released as a single on Epic Records in 1973. It was among several singles by Miller to reach the top ten on the North American country music charts. It also served as the title track for Miller's 1973 album Good News!. It received a positive response from Cashbox magazine shortly after its release.

== Background and recording ==
Jody Miller had her greatest commercial success when she tailored her career towards the country music market. Under the direction of producer of Billy Sherrill, a series of singles reached the top ten and top 20 of the country charts. This included 1973's "Good News". The song was composed by Sherrill himself, along with George Richey and Norro Wilson. Sherrill produced the track at the Columbia Studios in Nashville in January 1973.

== Release, reception and chart performance ==
"Good News" was released as a single by Epic Records in February 1973. It was backed on the B-side by a cover of Joe Stampley's "Soul Song". It was distributed as a seven-inch vinyl single. It received a positive review from Cashbox magazine in March 1973, which named it among its "Picks of the Week". " As many country songs tend to deal with the pain of lost love, it's even more refreshing to note that her latest is a joyful love song, lushly orchestrated and attractive to pop programmers as well as the country market," the publication wrote.

"Good News" reached the number nine position on the American Billboard Hot Country Songs chart and number nine on the Canadian RPM Country Tracks chart in 1973. It was Miller's fifth top ten single in her career and among her final top ten singles. It was followed in July 1973 by the release of Miller's album, also titled Good News!.

== Track listing ==
7" vinyl single

- "Good News" – 2:18
- "Soul Song" – 2:25

== Charts ==
=== Weekly charts ===
Weekly chart performance for "Good News"
Chart (1973)	Peak position
Canada Country Tracks (RPM)	9
US Hot Country Songs (Billboard)	9
