= Good News (Matt Dusk album) =

Studio album by Matt Dusk
- Released: October 27, 2009
- Genre: Jazz, Traditional pop
- Length: 44:58
- Label: Royal Crown
- Producer: Matt Dusk, Ron Lopata

Matt Dusk chronology
Back in Town (2006)	Good News (2009)	Live from Las Vegas (2010)

Good News is the fifth studio album by Canadian jazz singer Matt Dusk. It was released by Royal Crown Records on October 27, 2009. The album is a departure from previous Matt Dusk standard, having influences of Palm Beach Pop and crooner standards of the 1950s in a modern feel. The albums is filled with original tracks, plus a bonus classic available in Canada and on iTunes in the standard and deluxe edition.

== Track listing ==
No.	Title	Writer(s)	Length
1.	"Good News"	Mack, Habolin	3:18
2.	"I Wouldn't Change a Thing"	James Bryan McCollum, Matthew Marston	3:37
3.	"On Vacation"	Aimee Allen, Lucian Piane	3:54
4.	"Feels Good"	Marston, Pete Lewinson, Steve Lewinson	3:14
5.	"It's Not That Easy"	Lars Halvor Jensen, Martin Larsson, Ali Tennant, Frederik Friis, Sigurd Jansen, Glenn Tharaldsen	3:09
6.	"Never Gonna Fool Me"	Marston, Simon Ellis, Matt Dusk	2:55
7.	"Operator Please"	Jukka Immonen, Patric Sarin, Simon Wilcox, Dusk	3:14
8.	"Love Attack"	Harry Sommerdahl, Immonen, Risto Asikainen, Wilcox, Dusk	2:58
9.	"Don't Hate on Me"	Vincent Pontare, Sarin, Immonen	3:14
10.	"It Can Only Get Better"	Mack, Tysper, Grizzly	3:55
11.	"Do You Love Me"	Vincent, Mack, T. Jimson	3:32
12.	"Love Don't Let Me Go"	Roger Cook, Terrance Sawchuk	2:45
13.	"One for My Baby (and One More for the Road)" (hidden track)	Harold Arlen, Johnny Mercer	5:13
Total length:			44:58

iTunes Deluxe Edition
No.	Title	Length
14.	"Zoom Zoom"	3:21
15.	"Gotta Love You"	3:58

== Personnel ==
Per liner notes

- Matt Dusk – vocals, backing vocals, keyboard, producer
- Ron Lopata – bass guitar, keyboard, producer
- Jukka Immonen – keyboard, co-producer
- Terry Sawchuk – mixing engineer
- Richard Dodd – mastering engineer

Additional musicians

- Joel Parisien – backing vocals
- Quisha Wint – backing vocals
- Justin Abedin – guitar
- Davide Direnzo – drums, percussion
- Ross Macintyre – bass guitar
- Alex Kundakcioglu – trumpet
- Rob Somerville – trombone
- Chris Gale – alto sax, bari sax, horn arrangements
- Steve Macdonald – tenor sax, horn arrangements
- Singleton Chamber Orchestra – strings
- Lucian Piane – horn arrangements
- Shelly Berger – horn arrangements
- Kevin Fox – string arrangements

== Charts ==
Chart performance for Good News
Chart (2009–2011)	Peak position
Canadian Albums (Nielsen SoundScan)	41
Dutch Albums (Album Top 100)	92
French Albums (SNEP)	187
Polish Albums (ZPAV)	39

== Certifications ==
Certifications for Good News
Region	Certification	Certified units/sales
Poland (ZPAV)	Gold	10,000^{*}
^{*} Sales figures based on certification alone.
