= Bad News: How Woke Media Is Undermining Democracy =

2021 non-fiction book

- Author: Batya Ungar-Sargon
- Publisher: Encounter Books
- Publication date: 2021
- OCLC: 1243909867

Bad News: How Woke Media Is Undermining Democracy is a 2021 nonfiction book by Batya Ungar-Sargon.

== Premise ==
Ungar-Sargon argues that race-conscious perspectives promoted by print media aimed at upper-class, educated audiences have supplanted the class-conscious journalism that characterized earlier periods of U.S. media, dating back to the penny press era, when inexpensive newspapers were widely read across social classes. The book contends that identity politics and cultural issues have become central to media coverage, which it describes as "catering almost exclusively to the interests of urban, upper-class liberals".

== Reception ==
The Washington Independent Review of Books described the book as "the most penetrating analysis" of the current state of mainstream media.

The Jewish Book Council listed the book in its 2021–2022 JBC Network season.

== See also ==
- Woke
