= Every Time You Touch Me (I Get High) =

Single by Charlie Rich

from the album Every Time You Touch Me
- B-side: "Pass On By"
- Released: April 1975
- Studio: Columbia (Nashville, Tennessee)
- Genre: Country
- Length: 2:59
- Label: Epic 8-50103
- Songwriter(s): Charlie Rich; Billy Sherrill
- Producer(s): Billy Sherrill

Charlie Rich singles chronology
"It's All Over Now" (1975)	"Every Time You Touch Me (I Get High)" (1975)	"All Over Me" (1975)

"Every Time You Touch Me (I Get High)" is the title track from the 1975 album by Charlie Rich. The song was written by Rich and Billy Sherrill and peaked at number three on the country chart. "Every Time You Touch Me (I Get High)" also peaked at number nineteen on the Billboard Hot 100 (Rich's final top 40 hit) and fared better on the Easy Listening chart where it spent one week at number one.

== Charts ==
=== Weekly charts ===
Chart (1975)	Peak position
Australia (Kent Music Report)	86
US Billboard Hot 100	19
US Adult Contemporary (Billboard)	1
US Hot Country Songs (Billboard)	3
Canadian RPM Country Tracks	1
Canadian RPM Top Singles	31
Canadian RPM Adult Contemporary Tracks	2

=== Year-end charts ===
Chart (1975)	Position
US Adult Contemporary (Billboard)	13
US Hot Country Songs (Billboard)	34
