= The Uniques (Louisiana band) =

American rock band

The Uniques were an American rock band based in Louisiana, with Joe Stampley at the helm. Members included brother Bobby Stampley of Springhill, bass; Ray Mills of nearby Sarepta, lead guitar; Mike Love of Magnolia, Arkansas, drums; Jim Woodfield of Pine Bluff, Arkansas, guitar, and Joe Stampley, keyboard and lead vocalist. The members met while attending Southern State College (now Southern Arkansas University) in Magnolia, Arkansas, and formed the band. They were active from 1965 to 1970, recording most of their material at Robin Hood Studios in Tyler, Texas. They released their material on Paula Records of Shreveport. Their two biggest hits were "Not Too Long Ago" and "All These Things", which Stampley re-recorded in his country solo career and took to the top of the charts.

"All These Things" was written by Naomi Neville, a pseudonym for Allen Toussaint.

In the fall of 2010, the Uniques were inducted into the Louisiana Music Hall of Fame during their 45th-anniversary reunion concert at the Piney Woods Palace in Springhill. Original members Joe Stampley, Bobby Stampley, Ray Mills, Jim Woodfield, and Mike Love were present.

The song "You Ain't Tuff" was also featured on the Nuggets: Original Artyfacts from the First Psychedelic Era, 1965–1968 collection.

== Discography ==
=== Albums ===
Their actual LP releases on Paula Records were:

- Uniquely Yours (Paula LPS 2190) 1966, recorded at Robin Hood, Tyler
- Happening Now (Paula LPS 2194) 1967, recorded at Robin Hood, Tyler
- Playtime (Paula LPS 2199) 1968, recorded at Columbia Studios, Nashville
- The Uniques (Paula LPS 2204) 1969, recorded at Muscle Shoals Sound Studio
- Golden Hits (Paula LPS 2208) 1970

=== Singles ===
"Fast Way of Living" / "Not Too Long Ago" [1965, Paula catalog #219]

"Too Good to Be True" / "Never Been in Love" [1965, Paula catalog #222]

"Lady's Man" / "Bolivar J" [1965, Paula catalog #227]

"You Ain't Tuff" / "Strange" [1966, Paula catalog #231]

"Tell Me What To Do" / "All These Things" [1966, Paula catalog #238]

Run And Hide / Good Bye, So Long [1966, Paula catalog #245]

"Please Come Home for Christmas" (Vocal) / "Please Come Home for Christmas" (Instrumental) [Paula catalog #255]

"Georgia on My Mind" / "Too Good to Be True" / "Not Too Long Ago" / "And I Love Her" [1966 Continental (Brazil) - 7" 33⅓ vinyl - catalog #LD-33.795]

"Fool Number 1" / "Groovin' Out" [Continental (Brazil), catalog #CS-50.096]

Groovin' Out (On Your Good, Good Lovin') / Areba [1967 Paula catalog #264]

"Every Now and Then (I Cry)" / "Love Is a Precious Thing" [1967, Paula catalog #275]

"I'll Do Anything" / "Go on and Leave" [1967, Paula catalog #289]

"All It Took Was Love" / "It's All Over Now" [1968, Paula catalog #299]

"It Hurts Me to Remember" / "I Sure Feel More (Like I Do than I Did When I Got Here)" [1968, Paula catalog #307]

"How Lucky Can One Man Be" / "You Don't Miss Your Water" [1968, Paula catalog #313]

"Sha-La-Love" / "You Know (That I Love You)" [1969, Paula catalog #320]

"My Babe" / "Toys Are Made for Children" [1969, Paula catalog #324]

"You Know That I Love You" / "All These Things" [1969, Paula catalog #332]

"Eunice" / "No One but You" [1970, Paramount, catalog #PAA-0017]

"Lazy Afternoon" / "Shadow of Love" [1970, Paramount, catalog #PAA-0058]

"Lucille" / "One Night with You" [1971, Paramount, catalog #PAA-0116]

"Will You Love Me Tomorrow" / "I Am a Gemini" [1972, Paramount, catalog #PAA-0172]
