= Roll On Big Mama =

Single by Joe Stampley

from the album Joe Stampley
- B-side: "Love's Running Through My Veins"
- Released: January 1975
- Genre: Truck-driving country
- Label: Epic
- Songwriter: Dan Darst
- Producer: Norro Wilson

Joe Stampley singles chronology
"Penny" (1975)	"Roll On Big Mama" (1975)	"Unchained Melody" (1975)

"Roll On Big Mama" is a song written by Dan Darst, and recorded by American country music artist Joe Stampley. It was released January 1975 as the first single from the album Joe Stampley. The song was Stampley's second number one on the country chart. The single stayed at number one for one week and spent a total of ten weeks on the country chart. The song was written by Dan Darst.

== Song Background ==
The song is one of many in the country genre saluting the American truck driver.

== Charts ==
=== Weekly charts ===
Chart (1975)	Peak position
US Hot Country Songs (Billboard)	1
Canadian RPM Country Tracks	1

=== Year-end charts ===
Chart (1975)	Position
US Hot Country Songs (Billboard)	47
