= Quin Ivy =

American record producer (1937–2022)

- Birth name: Quinon Ray Ivy
- Born: June 3, 1937; Banner, Mississippi, U.S.
- Died: December 10, 2022 (aged 85); Oxford, Mississippi, U.S.
- Genres: Pop, soul
- Occupation(s): Record producer, songwriter, session musician
- Years active: 1964–1991
- Labels: Atlantic, Quinvy, South Camp, Atco

Quinon Ray Ivy (June 3, 1937 – December 10, 2022) was an American disc jockey turned songwriter and record producer, crucial to the Muscle Shoals scene in the 1960s.

== Early life ==
Ivy was born in Banner, Mississippi, the son of a sharecropper. He started his career as a DJ in Oxford, followed by spells at WMPS in Memphis, WKDA in Nashville and WLAY in Muscle Shoals, before settling in Sheffield, Alabama. There, he established a record store and began writing songs with producer Rick Hall of FAME Recording Studios. Their output includes the singles "I'm Qualified" and "Lollipops, Lace and Lipstick" both recorded by Jimmy Hughes.

== Career ==
In 1965, Ivy opened his Quinvy recording studio, where he produced the Percy Sledge single "When a Man Loves a Woman" which went to number one on the Billboard charts. He set up the Quinvy (independently distributed) and South Camp labels (distributed by Atlantic Records) before leaving the music business in the 1970s to gain an MBA degree from The University of Mississippi. He then taught accounting at the University of North Alabama until his retirement.

Ivy died on December 10, 2022, at the age of 85.
