= All These Things =

Single by Joe Stampley

from the album All These Things
- B-side: "My Louisiana Woman"
- Released: April 1976
- Genre: Country
- Label: Dot
- Songwriter: Allen Toussaint

Joe Stampley singles chronology
"Sheik of Chicago" (1976)	"All These Things" (1976)	"Was It Worth It" (1976)

"All These Things" is a 1962 single written by Allen Toussaint under the pseudonym of "Naomi Neville", and first recorded by Art Neville in 1962.

== Joe Stampley version ==
The biggest chart hit version was performed by Joe Stampley. In 1966, The Uniques recorded the song with Joe Stampley singing lead. "All These Things" was Stampley's third number one on the country chart. The single stayed at number one for a single week and spent a total of 13 weeks on the chart.

== Charts ==
=== Weekly charts ===
Chart (1976)	Peak position
US Hot Country Songs (Billboard)	1
Canadian RPM Country Tracks	22

=== Year-end charts ===
Chart (1976)	Position
US Hot Country Songs (Billboard)	12

== Cover versions ==
- An early recording was also done by Lee Tillman,
- A re-recording in 1981 charted at number 62.
- John Boutté recorded it, as well, and performed it regularly and at Allen Toussaint's memorial.
- James Booker recorded the song on his album Classified (1982).
- Elvis Costello recorded the song with Toussaint in 2006 for the album The River in Reverse.
