= Darling, You Can Always Come Back Home =

Single by Jody Miller

from the album Good News!
- B-side: "We'll Sing Our Song Together"
- Released: June 1973
- Recorded: April 1973
- Studio: Columbia (Nashville, Tennessee)
- Genre: Countrypolitan
- Length: 2:15
- Label: Epic
- Songwriters: Jerry Foster; Bill Rice
- Producer: Billy Sherrill

Jody Miller singles chronology
"Good News" (1973)	"Darling, You Can Always Come Back Home" (1973)	"The House of the Rising Sun" (1973)

"Darling, You Can Always Come Back Home" is a song originally recorded by American singer Jody Miller. It was written by Jerry Foster and Bill Rice. It was released as a single on Epic Records in 1973. It was one of six singles by Miller to reach the top ten on the North American country music charts. It appeared on Miller's 1973 album Good News!.

== Background and recording ==
Jody Miller first had success with pop songs such as "Queen of the House" in the 1960s. Then in the 1970s, her career was directed towards country music, where she would have her greatest commercial success. Several of her singles in the early part of the decade reached the top ten on the country charts. This included "Darling, You Can Always Come Back Home". The song was written by songwriters Jerry Foster and Bill Rice. The song was produced by Billy Sherrill at the Columbia Studios in Nashville in April 1973.

== Release, reception and chart performance ==
"Darling, You Can Always Come Back Home" was released as a single in the e by Epic Records in June 1973. It was backed on the B-side by a new recording called "We'll Sing Our Song Together". It was distributed as a seven-inch vinyl single. It reached the number five position on the American Billboard Hot Country Songs chart and number three on the Canadian RPM Country Tracks chart in 1973. "Darling, You Can Always Come Back Home" was Miller's sixth and final top ten single in her recording career. One month after the single's release, the song appeared on Miller's studio album Good News!.

== Track listing ==
7" vinyl single

- "Darling, You Can Always Come Back Home" – 2:15
- "We'll Sing Our Song Together" – 2:30

== Charts ==
=== Weekly charts ===
Weekly chart performance for "Darling, You Can Always Come Back Home"
Chart (1973)	Peak position
Canada Country Tracks (RPM)	3
US Hot Country Songs (Billboard)	5
