= Percy Sledge =

American R&B, soul and gospel singer (1940–2015)

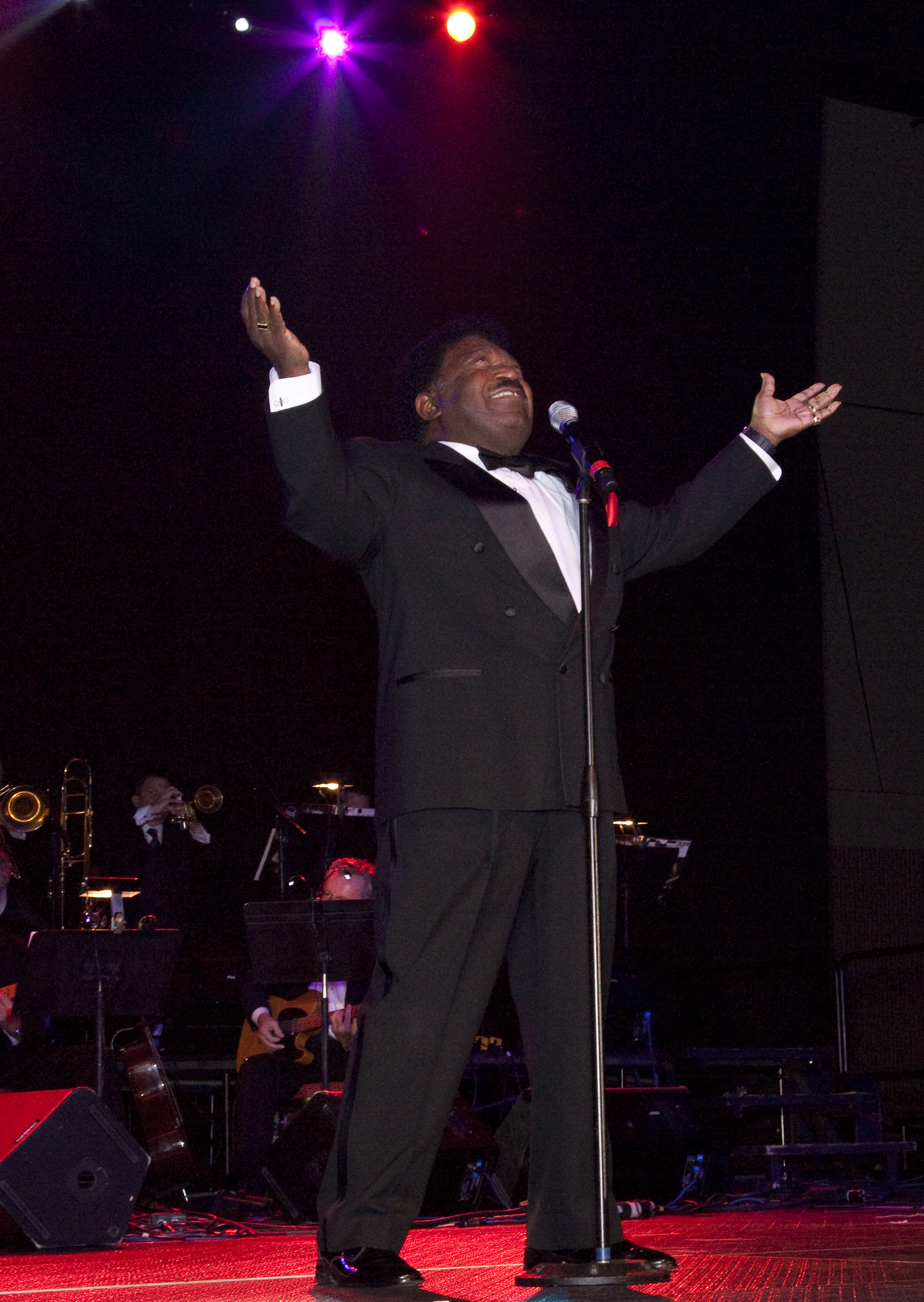
- Sledge at the 2010 Alabama Music Hall of Fame Concert

Background information
- Born: Percy Tyrone Sledge; November 25, 1940; Leighton, Alabama, U.S.
- Died: April 14, 2015 (aged 74) Baton Rouge, Louisiana, U.S.
- Genres: R&B, soul, traditional pop
- Instrument: Vocals
- Years active: 1960–2014
- Labels: Atlantic, Capricorn, Monument, Pointblank, Diablo Records, Sledgehammer Records, Virgin

Percy Tyrone Sledge (November 25, 1940 – April 14, 2015) was an American R&B, soul and gospel singer. He is best known for the song "When a Man Loves a Woman", a No. 1 hit on both the Billboard Hot 100 and R&B singles charts in 1966. It was awarded a million-selling, gold-certified disc from the RIAA.

After working as a hospital orderly in the early 1960s, Sledge achieved his greatest success in the late 1960s and early 1970s with a series of emotional soul songs. In 1989, Sledge received the Rhythm and Blues Foundation's Pioneer Award. He was inducted into the Rock & Roll Hall of Fame in 2005.

== Biography ==
=== Early career ===
Sledge was born on November 25, 1940, in Leighton, Alabama. He worked in a series of agricultural jobs in the fields near Leighton, before taking a job as an orderly at Colbert County Hospital in Sheffield, Alabama. Through the mid-1960s, he toured the Southeast with the Esquires Combo on weekends, while working at the hospital during the week. A former patient and mutual friend of Sledge and record producer Quin Ivy introduced the two. An audition followed, and Sledge was signed to a recording contract.

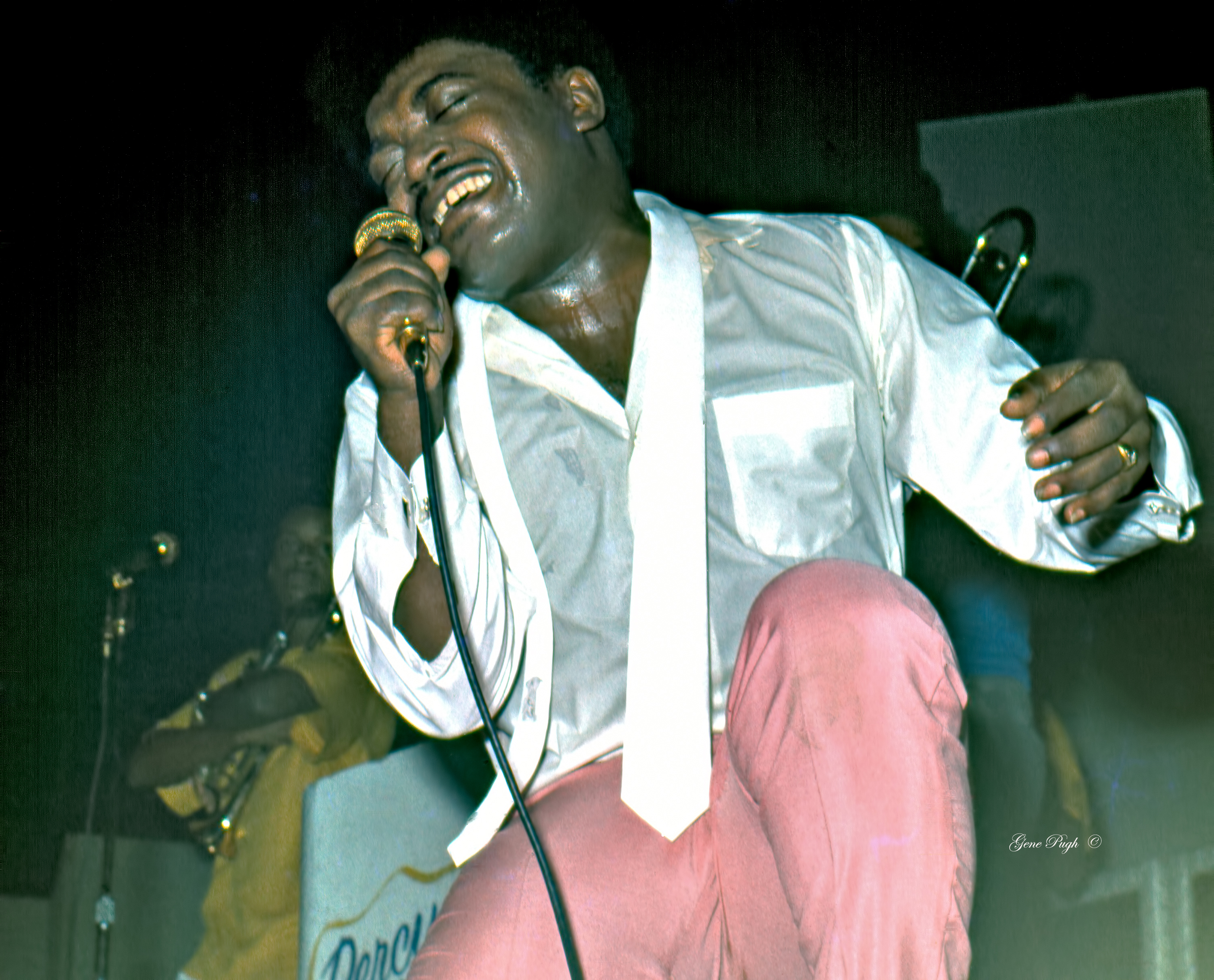
Sledge performing on tour in 1974

Sledge's soulful voice was perfect for the series of soul ballads produced by Ivy and Marlin Greene, which rock critic Dave Marsh called "emotional classics for romantics of all ages". "When a Man Loves a Woman" was Sledge's first song recorded under the contract, and was released in March 1966. According to Sledge, the inspiration for the song came when his girlfriend left him for a modelling career after he was laid off from a construction job in late 1965, and, because bassist Calvin Lewis and organist Andrew Wright helped him with the song, he gave all the songwriting credits to them. It reached No. 1 in the US and went on to become an international hit. "When a Man Loves a Woman" was a hit twice in the UK, reaching No. 4 in 1966 and, on reissue, peaked at No. 2 in 1987. The song was also the first gold record released by Atlantic Records. The soul anthem became the cornerstone of Sledge's career, and was followed by "Warm and Tender Love" (covered by British singer Elkie Brooks in 1981), "It Tears Me Up", "Take Time to Know Her" (his second biggest US hit, reaching No. 11; the song's lyric was written by Steve Davis), "Love Me Tender", and "Cover Me".

Sledge charted with "I'll Be Your Everything" and "Sunshine" during the 1970s, and became an international concert favorite throughout the world, especially in the Netherlands, Germany, and on the African continent; he averaged 100 concerts a year in apartheid-era South Africa.

=== Later career ===
Sledge's career enjoyed a renaissance in the 1980s during which "When a Man Loves a Woman" re-entered the UK Singles Chart after being used in a Levi's commercial, peaking at No. 2 behind the reissued Ben E. King classic "Stand by Me". On March 23, 1987, Sledge performed "When a Man Loves a Woman" as the musical guest on Saturday Night Live hosted by Bill Murray. In the early 1990s, Michael Bolton brought "When a Man Loves a Woman" back into the limelight again on his hit album Time, Love, & Tenderness. On the week of November 17 to November 23, 1991, Bolton's version also hit No. 1 on the Billboard Hot 100 singles chart, exactly 25½ years to the week after Percy's did in 1966.

In 1994, Saul Davis and Barry Goldberg produced Sledge's album Blue Night for Philippe Le Bras' Sky Ranch label and Virgin Records. It featured Bobby Womack, Steve Cropper, and Mick Taylor among others. Blue Night received a Grammy nomination for Best Contemporary Blues Album, Vocal or Instrumental, and in 1996 it won the W.C. Handy Award for best soul or blues album.

In 2004, Davis and Goldberg also produced the Shining Through the Rain album, which preceded his induction into the Rock & Roll Hall of Fame. Songs on the CD were written by Mikael Rickfors, Steve Earle, the Bee Gees, Carla Olson, Denny Freeman, Allan Clarke and Jackie Lomax. The same year, Percy recorded a live album with his band Sunset Drive entitled Percy Sledge and Sunset Drive – Live in Virginia on WRM Records produced by Warren Rodgers.

In May 2007, Percy was inducted into The Louisiana Music Hall Of Fame in Baton Rouge, LA.

In December 2010, Rhino Handmade issued a four-CD retrospective, The Atlantic Recordings, which covers all of the issued Atlantic masters, as well as many of the tracks unissued in the United States (although some are simply the mono versions of songs originally issued in stereo; Disc 1 comprises Sledge's first two LPs, which were not recorded on stereo equipment). In 2011 Sledge toured with Sir Cliff Richard during his Soulicious tour, performing "I'm Your Puppet".

=== Personal life ===
Sledge married twice and had twelve children, three of whom became singers.

== Death ==
Sledge died of liver cancer at his home in Baton Rouge on April 14, 2015, at the age of 74. His interment was in Baton Rouge's Heavenly Gates Cemetery.

== Accolades ==
Sledge was:

- An inaugural Rhythm and Blues Foundation Pioneer Award honoree in 1989.
- Inducted into the Alabama Music Hall of Fame in 1993.
- The recipient of the Blues Music Award in 1996 for best Soul/Blues album of the year with his record Blue Night.
- Inducted into the Carolina Beach Music Hall of Fame in November 2004.
- Inducted into the Rock and Roll Hall of Fame in 2005.
- Inducted into the Louisiana Music Hall of Fame for his contributions by the State of Louisiana in May 2007.
- Inducted into the Delta Music Museum in Ferriday, Louisiana.
- Inducted into the National Rhythm & Blues Hall of Fame in 2021.
- Sledge's hometown of Leighton, Alabama announced in 2022 it would be having an annual event labeled as "Sledgefest".

== Selected discography ==
=== Albums ===
Year	Title	Chart positions			Label
Year	Title	US 200	US R&B	UK	Label
1966	When a Man Loves a Woman	37	2	—	Atlantic 8125
1966	Warm & Tender Soul	136	9	—	Atlantic 8132
1967	The Percy Sledge Way	178	—	—	Atlantic 8146
1968	Take Time to Know Her	148	27	—	Atlantic 8180
1968	The Best of Percy Sledge	133	27	—	Atlantic 8210
1970	Percy Sledge in South Africa	—	—	—	Atlantic ATC 9257
1974	I'll Be Your Everything	—	48	—	Capricorn CP 0147
1987	When a Man Loves a Woman (The Ultimate Collection)	—	—	36	Atlantic
1994	Blue Night	—	—	—	Sky Ranch Records/Virgin
2004	Shining Through the Rain	—	—	—	Varèse Sarabande
2013	The Gospel of Percy Sledge	—	—	—	Elevate
"—" denotes releases that did not chart or were not released in that territory.

=== Singles ===
Year	Title	Chart positions				Certifications
Year	Title	US Hot 100	US R&B	CAN	UK	Certifications
1966	"When a Man Loves a Woman"	1	1	1	4	BPI: Gold
1966	"Warm and Tender Love"	17	5	10	34	
1966	"It Tears Me Up"	20	7	12	—	
1967	"Baby, Help Me"	87	44	—	—	
1967	"Out of Left Field"	59	25	—	—	
1967	"Love Me Tender" (A-Side)	40	35	35	—	
1967	→ "What Am I Living For" (B-Side)	91	—	—	—	
1967	"Just Out of Reach (of My Two Empty Arms)"	66	—	—	—	
1967	"Cover Me"	42	39	—	—	
1968	"Take Time to Know Her"	11	6	5	—	
1968	"Sudden Stop"	63	41	—	—	
1968	"You're All Around Me"	109	—	—	—	
1969	"My Special Prayer"	93	44	—	—	
1969	"Any Day Now" (A-Side)	86	35	—	—	
1969	→ "The Angels Listened In" (B-Side)	126	—	—	—	
1969	"Kind Woman"	116	—	—	—	
1969	"True Love Travels on a Gravel Road"	—	—	—	—	
1970	"Many Rivers to Cross"	—	—	—	—	
1970	"Help Me Make It Through the Night"	—	—	—	—	
1971	"Stop the World Tonight"	—	—	—	—	
1972	"Rainbow Road"	—	—	—	—	
1972	"Sunday Brother"	—	—	—	—	
1973	"Sunshine"	—	89	—	—	
1974	"I'll Be Your Everything"	62	15	—	—	
1987	"When a Man Loves a Woman" (Re-issue)	—	—	—	2	
Source: "—" denotes releases that did not chart or were not released in that territory.

- 1994: "I Wish It Would Rain" (Sky Ranch / Virgin, Sweden) duet with Mikael Rickfors produced by Saul Davis & Barry Goldberg.
- 1994 "You Got Away with Love" (Pat Robinson & Rocky Burnette) / "Why Did You Stop?" (Carla Olson) (Sky Ranch / Virgin, France) produced by Saul Davis & Barry Goldberg.

=== In popular culture ===
Sledge is sometimes cited as the inspiration behind the Australian language term "to sledge", meaning "to put someone off their game", first used in Test cricket, though the phrase more probably derives from "subtle as a sledgehammer".
