= Soul Song =

Single by Joe Stampley

from the album Soul Song
- B-side: "Not Too Long Ago"
- Released: October 1972 (U.S.)
- Recorded: September 1972
- Genre: Country
- Length: 2:25
- Label: Dot 17442
- Songwriters: George Richey, Billy Sherrill and Norro Wilson
- Producer: Norro Wilson

Joe Stampley singles chronology
"If You Touch Me (You've Got to Feel Me)" (1972)	"Soul Song" (1972)	"Bring It On Home to Your Woman" (1973)

“Soul Song” is a song written by George Richey, Billy Sherrill and Norro Wilson and first recorded by Tanya Tucker as a track for her 1972 debut album Delta Dawn.

== Background ==
The song also represented a first for co-writer Norro Wilson: a No. 1 hit as a producer. Wilson had previously written several songs that topped Billboard magazine’s Hot Country Singles chart—notably, David Houston’s “Baby, Baby (I Know You’re a Lady),” and Tammy Wynette’s “He Loves Me All the Way” and “My Man (Understands).” During the next three decades, Wilson produced numerous No. 1 hits (including two more by Stampley), including Margo Smith, Charley Pride, Janie Fricke, Chely Wright, Kenny Chesney and Reba McEntire.

== Joe Stampley recording ==
The song was later recorded by American country music singer Joe Stampley. It was released in September 1972 as the first single and title track from the album Soul Song, The song was Stampley's first No. 1 song,

== Charts ==
=== Weekly charts ===
Chart (1972–73)	Peak position
US Hot Country Songs (Billboard)	1
U.S. Billboard Hot 100	37
U.S. Cash Box Top 100	33
Canadian RPM Country Tracks	2

=== Year-end charts ===
Chart (1973)	Position
US Hot Country Songs (Billboard)	39

== Sources ==
- Allmusic — Soul Song
- Roland, Tom, "The Billboard Book of Number One Country Hits" (Billboard Books, Watson-Guptill Publications, New York, 1991 (ISBN 0-82-307553-2))
