= Hey Joe! =

1953 country song

"Hey Joe"

Single by Carl Smith
- B-side: "Darlin' Am I The One"
- Published: July 17, 1953
- Released: May 19, 1953
- Genre: Country
- Length: 2:28
- Label: Columbia
- Songwriter: Boudleaux Bryant

Carl Smith singles chronology
| "Do I Like It?" (1953) | "Hey Joe" (1953) | "Satisfaction Guaranteed" (1953) |

"Hey Joe!" is a 1953 popular song written by Boudleaux Bryant. It was recorded by Carl Smith for Columbia Records on 19 May 1953 and spent eight weeks at No. 1 on the US country music chart, marking Bryant's first no. 1 record. He later wrote songs with his wife Felice for The Everly Brothers. The song was first published in New York on July 17, 1953, as "Hey, Joe".

A contemporary cover version by Frankie Laine was a hit on the Billboard chart, and also reached No. 1 in the UK Singles Chart. Later that year, Kitty Wells recorded an answer record, also titled "Hey Joe", which hit No. 8 on the Jukebox Country & Western chart.

== Frankie Laine recording ==
"Hey Joe!"

Single by Frankie Laine with Paul Weston and his Orchestra and The Norman Luboff Choir Carl Fischer-Piano
- B-side: "Sittin' In The Sun (Countin' My Money)"
- Published: July 17, 1953
- Released: July 6, 1953
- Recorded: June 22, 1953
- Studio: Radio Recorders (Hollywood, California)
- Genre: Country, traditional pop
- Length: 2:18
- Label: Columbia
- Songwriter: Boudleaux Bryant
- Producer: Mitch Miller

A pop cover of "Hey Joe!" was made by Frankie Laine on June 22, 1953, at Radio Recorders in Hollywood, with Paul Weston and his Orchestra and the Norman Luboff Choir, also featuring Carl Fischer on piano. Produced by Mitch Miller, the single was released by Columbia (the same label who issued the Carl Smith version) on July 6. It was featured in Billboard's New Records To Watch, with the magazine commenting, "It's a good tune for Laine, and he handles it in his customary exciting style." Laine's "Hey Joe!" entered Billboard's Best Selling Singles chart on August 22, where it peaked at No. 6.

In the UK, Laine's recording was an even bigger success. Released by Philips in August 1953, it entered the New Musical Express singles chart on October 16, 1953. "Hey Joe!" reached No. 1 on the UK Singles Chart the following week, October 23. It was Laine's second UK chart topper, but unlike his record-breaking hit "I Believe", "Hey Joe!" only stayed on the chart for eight weeks, including two at No. 1. On October 23, Laine had three singles in the chart, which at that time consisted of only twelve positions. The following week, Laine's third No. 1 hit in the UK, "Answer Me", entered the chart, giving him a third of all the records on the listing.

== Other contemporary recordings ==
The version by Carl Smith charted at No. 1 on the US country chart, but did not appear on the overall Best Selling Singles listing. Similarly, another country recording, by Kitty Wells, only made the country chart, peaking at No. 8.

In the UK's sheet music sales chart, "Hey Joe" first made the top 20 on October 3, 1953, and peaked at No. 14 in a nine-week run. Aside from the popular version by Frankie Laine, just two other contemporary cover recordings were available in the UK, by British singers Ronnie Meede (released on Decca in September) and Frankie Vaughan (issued by His Master's Voice in October).

== Later recordings ==
- Moe Bandy and Joe Stampley recorded a new version of the song with the modified title "Hey Joe, Hey Moe", with lyrics specially rewritten for the project by Boudleaux Bryant, as the title song to a duet album issued in 1981. The song, released as the lead single to the album, was a top 10 country hit that year.
- On the Statler Brothers' unusual comic album Alive At The Johnny Mack Brown High School, released in 1974 under their alias Lester "Roadhog" Moran & The Cadillac Cowboys, the first song after the band's theme song is "Hey Joe".
