= Joe Stampley =

American country music singer (born 1943)

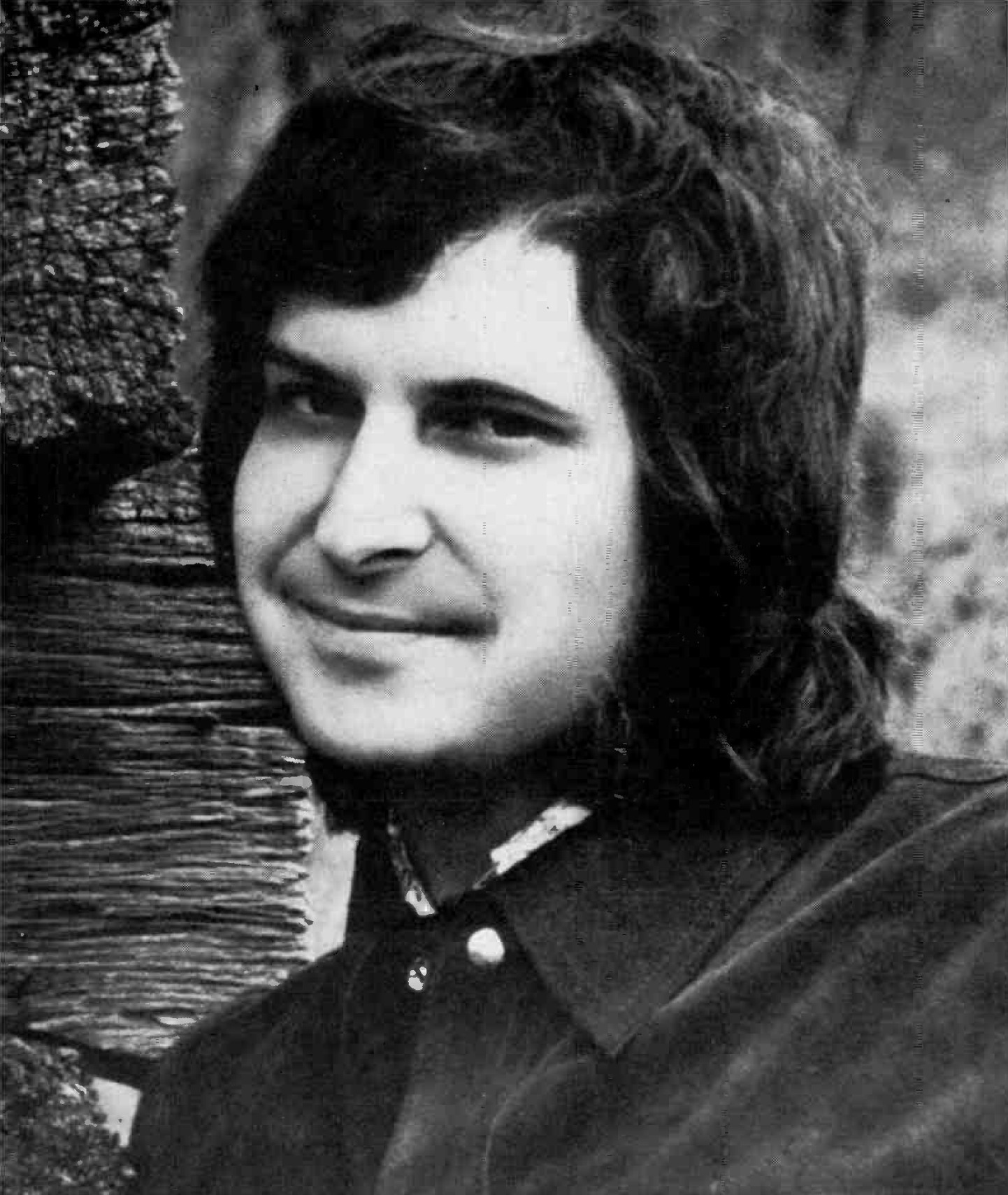
- Stampley in 1974

Background information
- Born: June 6, 1943 (age 83); Springhill, Louisiana, United States
- Genres: Country
- Occupation: Singer
- Instruments: Vocals, piano
- Years active: 1960s–present
- Labels: Dot; ABC; Epic; Columbia
- Website: www.joestampley.com

Joe Stampley (born June 6, 1943) is an American country music singer. He had success as the lead singer of a rock group, in a country duo with Moe Bandy, and as a solo performer. Stampley has released over 20 albums and more than 60 singles in a career that spans seven decades. In 2000, he formed Critter Records.

== Biography ==
He was born in Springhill, Louisiana, United States, to R. C. Stampley, Jr. (1920–2000) and Mary E. Stampley (1924–2004). Stampley befriended Merle Kilgore when he was 15, and they started writing songs together. Kilgore arranged for Stampley to record two sides with Imperial Records, and the resulting single, "Glenda" (1959), sold well locally but not elsewhere. In 1961, Chess Records released another single by Stampley, "Teenage Picnic", but it also flopped.

In the 1960s, Stampley was the main singer for the Uniques rock group (not to be confused with the Jamaican and doo-wop groups with the same name). The Uniques were based out of Shreveport, about 55 miles southwest of Springhill, and began performing in Arkansas, Louisiana, and Texas. In 1965, the Uniques recorded "Not Too Long Ago" (another Kilgore/Stampley composition), the first national hit for Paula Records. One year later, they followed with "All These Things". The Uniques released four original albums, and one greatest hits compilation between 1965 and their 1970 breakup. Most of their material was rooted in rhythm and blues, rock, pop, and swamp pop genres.

In 1971, Stampley signed with ABC-Dot and recorded seven country albums that produced such hits as "Soul Song", "Too Far Gone", "If You Touch Me, You've Got To Love Me", "I'm Still Loving You", and a remake of "All These Things" as a two-step, which reached number one on the country chart.

In 1975, he moved to Epic Records, where he released 13 albums, including such hits as "Roll On Big Mama," "Red Wine and Blue Memories," "If You've Got Ten Minutes (Let's Fall in Love)", "Do You Ever Fool Around", and "I'm Gonna Love You Back to Lovin' Me Again."

Stampley has over 60 charted records. Joel Whitburn ranked Stampley 52nd among all country artists from 1944–1993 for charted singles. In 1976, Stampley had eight singles on the Billboard country chart and was Billboard's singles artist of the year.

In 2000, Stampley founded Critter Records. The first act signed to the label was Billy Hoffman.

Stampley occasionally performs in his native Springhill.

=== Collaboration with Moe Bandy ===
During the height of his success, Stampley began teaming with Moe Bandy on a string of duets. Unlike the honky-tonk standards for which both artists were known, most of the "Moe and Joe" collaborations were tongue-in-cheek novelty and satirical songs. Their first charting hit together, "Just Good Ol' Boys", became a number-one hit in September 1979, and was their most successful single. Their other hits were "Holding the Bag", "Hey Moe, Hey Joe" (a cover of a single originally recorded by Carl Smith, with modified title and lyrics), and "Where's the Dress". The latter was a satire on Boy George, and had an opening guitar riff similar to Culture Club's number-one pop hit "Karma Chameleon", which got the duo into copyright problems.

"Where's The Dress" won the American Video Association's award for Video of the Year in 1984. Bandy and Stampley were recognized as the Country Music Association's 1980 Vocal Duo of the Year (as Moe and Joe), and won the Academy of Country Music's Vocal Duo award for two consecutive years.
