= List of awards and nominations received by Anna Vissi =

Anna Vissi awards and nominations
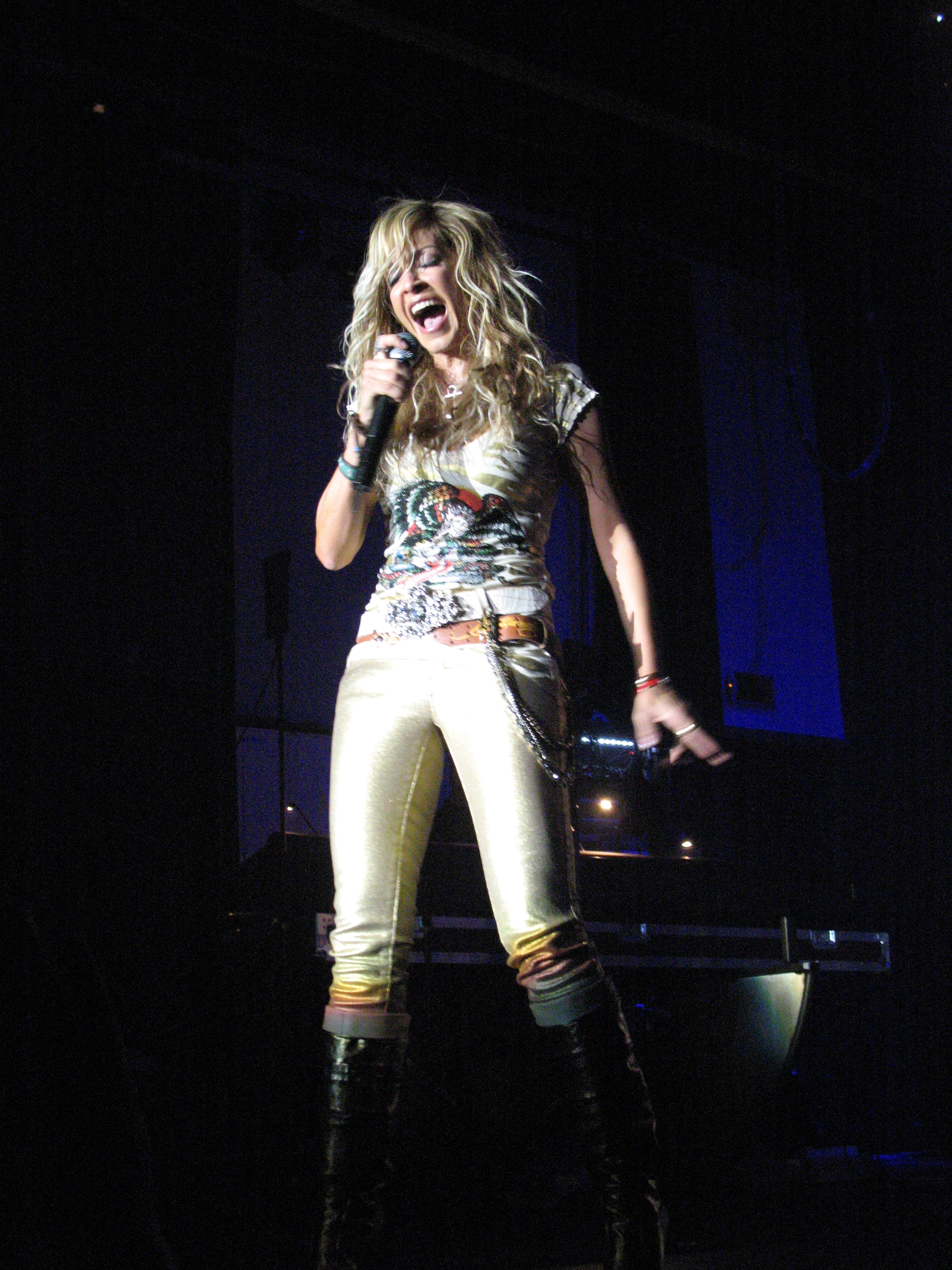
- Vissi performing in New York City in 2007
Award	Wins	Nominations
Arion Music Awards	7	7+
Balkan Music Awards	2	3
Cyprus Music Awards	4	4
Eurovision awards	0	6	
Hellenic Charity Ball	1	1
Life & Style Women of the Year Awards	1	1+
MAD Video Music Awards	9	22
Pop Corn Music Awards	22	26+
Thessaloniki Song Festival	2	2
- Totals
Awards won	48
Nominations	70+

This page features a list of awards and nominations received by Greek Cypriot singer-songwriter Anna Vissi. Since making her professional music debut in 1973, Vissi has released 26 studio albums: As Kanoume Apopse Mian Arhi (1978), Kitrino Galazio (1979), Nai (1980), Anna Vissi (1981), Eimai To Simera Kai Eisai To Chthes (1982), Na 'Hes Kardia (1984), Kati Simveni (1985), I Epomeni Kinisi (1986), Tora (1988), Empnefsi! (1988), Fotia (1989), Eimai (1990), Emeis (1992) (with Nikos Karvelas), Lambo (1992), Re! (1994), O! Kypros (1995), Klima Tropiko (1996), Travma (1997), Antidoto (1998), Everything I Am (2000), Kravgi (2000), Chi (2002), Paraksenes Eikones (2003), Nylon (2005), Apagorevmeno (2008), and Agapi Einai Esi (2010). She has also released two live albums: Live! (1993) and Live (2004). Vissi had her biggest commercial success with Fotia, followed by the double Kravgi, which is the best-selling album of the 2000s (decade) in Greece and eighth best-selling of all time in terms of units, while five other albums —Kitrino Galazio, I Epomeni Kinisi, Klima Tropiko, Travma, and Antidoto— have achieved six-figure shipments. These albums have been released on Minos (1973–78), EMI Greece (1979–82), CarVi (1982), and Sony Music Entertainment Greece (1983–present). She has released material abroad on Moda Records.

Vissi and her family moved to Greece after she won a national talent competition in Cyprus, which was followed by her debut at the Thessaloniki Song Festival where she was awarded the top prizes for "Best Vocals" and "Best Composition" for the song "As Kanoume Apopse Mian Arhi" in 1978. This led to her recording multiple promo singles, collaborating with well-known producers, and releasing a debut album of the same name. In the 1980s, Vissi became a prominent figure in Greek music and participated in the Eurovision Song Contest in 1980 for Greece and 1982 for Cyprus, finishing 13th and fifth respectively. While her first performance was not a success, her second remains the highest placement that Cyprus has earned in the Contest. Vissi returned to the Contest in 2006 finishing ninth, however, she later regretted her latest performance, calling it a "big mistake".

Vissi's popularity culminated in the mid-1990s to the mid-2000s (decade), becoming a prominent performer of the laiko-pop genre reigning at the time. The first annual music awards were materialized in Greece with the launch of the Pop Corn Music Awards; in 1996 Vissi won three awards for her album Klima Tropiko. She was further awarded a record eight awards for Travma in 1998 and a further five awards for Kravgi in 2000, while she won the Song of the Decade honour in 1999 for "Den Thelo Na Xereis". With a total of 22 awards, she became one of the most-awarded artists in the awards' history and received honors for Best Female Artist, Best Female Vocal Performance, Best Female Stage Performance, Best Song, and Best Album. Vissi has also received four Cyprus Music Awards, seven Arion Music Awards, including three for "Video of the Year", and a Life & Style Women of the Year Award, while she has also won nine MAD Video Music Awards in eight different categories, and set the record for most awards won in one night with four honours at the first ceremony in 2004. Apart from these Vissi has been honoured for her contribution to contemporary Greek music at the Balkan Music Awards and Hellenic Charity Ball. She has been nominated for awards in laïko, contemporary laïko, pop, dance and hip hop categories and has won 48 recognized awards from over 70 nominations.

This list includes only recognized awards and not polls and other awards. Also, the list may be incomplete due to the lack of sources on Greek awards prior to 2000.

== Arion Music Awards ==
The Arion Music Awards are the official Greek music industry awards by IFPI Greece since 2002, after the Pop Corn Music Awards, which were organized by the Greek magazine Pop Corn from 1997 to 2001, were discontinued. The Arions were broadcast by Mega Channel in their first five years before moving to ANT1 channel. The awards have not been held since 2007 for various reasons. Vissi has won seven awards.

Year	Nominated work	Award	Result
2002	Kravgi	Female Singer of the Year	Won
2003	X	Best Female Pop Singer	Won
2003	"Taseis Aftoktonias"	Video of the Year	Won
2004	Paraksenes Eikones	Best Female Contemporary Laïko Singer	Won
2004	"Treno"	Video of the Year	Won
2004	"Treno"	Song of the Year	Won
2005	"Min Psahneis Tin Agapi"	Video of the Year	Won

== Balkan Music Awards ==
The Balkan Music Awards were established in 2010 by Balkanica Music Television and are held annually in different cities of the Balkans. The awards honour outstanding achievements for Balkan artists in the recording industry. Vissi has won two awards from three nominations. In the first year she received an honorary award for "exceptional contribution to the development and popularisation of the Balkan music".

Year	Nominated work	Award	Result
2010	Anna Vissi	Balkan Star Award for exceptional contribution to the development and popularisation of the Balkan music for 2009	Won
2010	Anna Vissi	Best Female Performer in the Balkans for 2009	Nominated
2010	"Stin Pira"	Best Video in the Balkans for 2009	Won

== Cyprus Music Awards ==
The Cyprus Music Awards are the official Cypriot music awards, held by Cyprus College in Nicosia, Cyprus in 2006 and 2007 before being cancelled. Vissi has won four awards from four nominations.

Year	Nominated work	Award	Result
2006	"Erota I Polemo" (feat. Nikos "NiVo" Vourliotis)	Best Collaboration	Won
2006	"Everything"	Female Singer of the Year	Won
2006	"Everything"	Video of the Year	Won
2006	"Call Me"	Best-Selling Single of the Year	Won

== Eurovision awards ==
=== Eurovision Song Contest ===
The Eurovision Song Contest is an annual competition held among active member countries of the EBU. The contest, which has been broadcast every year since its début in 1956, is one of the longest-running television programs and most watched in the world. Vissi represented Greece on two occasions in 1980 and 2006, and represented her native Cyprus in 1982. She has finished 13th, fifth, and ninth from three participations.

Year	Nominated work	Result	Place	Points
1980	"Autostop"	Nominated	13th	30
1982	"Mono I Agapi"	Nominated	5th	85
2006	"Everything"	Nominated	9th	128

=== Marcel Bezençcon Awards ===
The Marcel Bezençon Awards were first handed out during the Eurovision Song Contest 2002 in Tallinn, Estonia honouring the best competing songs in the final. Founded by Christer Björkman (Sweden's representative in the Eurovision Song Contest 1992 and current Head of Delegation for Sweden) and Richard Herrey (member of the Herreys, Eurovision Song Contest 1984 winner from Sweden), the awards are named after the creator of the annual competition, Marcel Bezençon. The awards are divided into 3 categories: Press Award — given to the best entry as voted on by the accredited media and press during the event; Artistic Award — presented to the best artist as voted on by the commentators; and Composer Award — a jury consisting of the participating composers vote for the best and most original composition. Vissi has received three nominations.

Year	Nominated work	Award	Result
2006	"Everything"	Press Award	Nominated
2006	Anna Vissi	Artistic Award	Nominated
2006	"Everything"	Composer Award (with Nikos Karvelas)	Nominated

== Hellenic Charity Ball ==
The Hellenic Charity Ball was established in 1997 and is held every other year in San Francisco, California to honour "the brightest arts and entertainment luminaries in the Greek-American community". Vissi was one of four inductees in 2011.

Year	Nominated work	Award	Result
2011	Anna Vissi	Hellenic Charity Ball inductee	Won

== Life & Style Women of the Year Awards ==
The Life & Style Women of the Year Awards is an annual awards show established in 2003 by the women's interest magazine Life & Style as an equivalent to the Status Men of the Year Awards to honour women who have excelled within various fields, including arts, entertainment, journalism, politics, and science. Vissi has won one award.

Year	Nominated work	Award	Result
2005	Anna Vissi	Vocalist of the Year	Won

== Pop Corn Music Awards ==
The Pop Corn Music Awards that were held by the music magazine Pop Corn from 1992 until 2001, televised on Alpha TV. The awards were the first organized music awards show in Greece and served as the national music awards ceremony for ten years, making them the longest-running music industry awards show ever in Greece. They were voted on by the magazine's readers and industry insiders. They were replaced in 2002 by the Arion Music Awards. Vissi has won 15 awards, more than any other artist. She also won a special award at the 1999 ceremony for Song of the Decade for "Den Thelo Na Xereis".

Year	Nominated work	Award	Result
1992	"Den Thelo Na Xeris"	Best Female Vocal Performance	Won
1996	Klima Tropiko	Best Female Singer	Won
1996	"Parte Ta Ola"	Best Female Vocal Performance	Won
1996	"Parte Ta Ola"	Biggest Airplay Single	Won
1997	Travma	Best Female Singer	Won
1997	"Travma"	Best Female Vocal Performance	Won
1997	Anna Vissi	Best Female Stage Performance	Won
1997	Travma	Best Album Cover	Won
1997	"Travma"	Best Song	Won
1997	Travma	Best Album	Won
1997	"Travma"	Biggest Airplay Single	Won
1997	"Mavra Gialia"	Best Composition (Nikos Karvelas)	Won
1998	Antidoto	Best Female Singer	Won
1998	"Gazi"	Best Female Vocal Performance	Won
1998	Anna Vissi	Best Female Stage Performance	Won
1999	Anna Vissi	Best Female Singer	Won
1999	"Den Thelo Na Xeris"	Song of the Decade	Won
2000	Kravgi	Best Female Artist	Won
2000	"Afti Ti Fora"	Best Vocal Performance	Won
2000	Anna Vissi	Best Female Stage Performance	Won
2000	"Agapi Ipervoliki"	Best Video (Giorgos Gavalos/View Studio)	Won
2000	"Agapi Ipervoliki"	Best Single	Won
2001	Anna Vissi	Best Female Singer	Nominated
2001	"Horis To Moro Mou"	Best Video Clip	Nominated
2001	"Kravgi"	Best Dance Song	Nominated
2001	Anna Vissi	Best Female Stage Performance	Nominated

== MAD Video Music Awards ==
The MAD Video Music Awards are held annually in June by MAD TV since 2004. In its first two years, the awards were televised on ANT1 for non-satellite viewers, but have since moved to Alpha TV. Vissi has won nine awards from 20 nominations. The first year Vissi set the record for most awards won in a single night, having won four.

Year	Nominated work	Award	Result
2004	"Treno"	Best Contemporary Laïka Video	Won
2004	"Treno"	Best Video by a Female Artist	Won
2004	"Treno"	Artist of the Year with Most-Played Video	Won
2004	"Treno"	Best-Dressed Artist in a Video	Won
2005	"Eho Pethani Gia Sena"	Best Dance Video	Won
2005	"Eho Pethani Gia Sena"	Best Video by a Female Artist	Nominated
2005	"Eho Pethani Gia Sena"	Best Video of the Year	Nominated
2005	"Eho Pethani Gia Sena"	Artist of the Year with Most-Played Video	Nominated
2005	"Min Psahneis Tin Agapi"	Sexiest Appearance in a Video	Won
2006	"Erota I Polemo"	Best Hip-Hop Video	Won
2006	"Nylon"	Best Video by a Female Artist	Nominated
2006	"Nylon"	Best Dance Video	Nominated
2006	"Nylon"	Artist of the Year with Most-Played Video	Nominated
2009	"Stin Pira"	Artist of the Year	Nominated
2009	"Stin Pira"	Female Artist of the Year	Nominated
2009	"Apagorevmeno" (Argyris Papadimitropoulos)	Best Direction	Nominated
2009	"Stin Pira"	Fashion Icon of the Year	Won
2009	"Stin Pira"	Best Lyric that Became a Catchphrase	Won
2010	"Fabulous"	Female Artist of the Year	Nominated
2010	"Fabulous"	Best Lyric that Became a Catchphrase	Nominated
2013	"Tiraniemai"	Female Artist of the Year	Nominated
2013	"Tiraniemai"	Top50 Track Of The Year by Mediainspector	Nominated
2013	"Eisai (Elias Pantazopoulos 2004 Mix)"	Best Act MAD VMA 10 Years	N/A
2014	"I Kathimerinotita Mas"	Artist of the Year	Nominated
2016	—	Exceptional Contribution Award	Won
2017	"Protimo Na Petheno"	Superfans Of Year	Nominated
2023	-	Best Female Adult Laiko	Nominated
2025	"Se Periptosi pou"	Video Clip of the Year	Won
2025	"Se Periptosi pou"	Viral Song	Won

== Thessaloniki Song Festival ==
The Thessaloniki Song Festival is an annual competition held in Thessaloniki since 1962. It is the longest-running music festival and award ceremony in Greece. There are a number of titles awarded, with the ultimate winner being the recipient of the "Best Composition" award, which made Vissi the winner of the competition. Vissi has won two awards.

Year	Nominated work	Award	Result	Place
1977	"As Kanoume Apopse Mian Arhi"	Best Vocals	Won	1st
1977	"As Kanoume Apopse Mian Arhi"	Best Composition	Won	1st
