= Travma =

1997 album by Anna Vissi

Travma Τραύμα

Studio album by Anna Vissi
- Released: 16 April 1997
- Studio: Kyriazis studio
- Genre: Pop, modern laika
- Length: 1:02:02
- Language: Greek
- Label: Sony Music Greece; Columbia
- Producer: Nikos Karvelas

Anna Vissi chronology
Klima Tropiko (1996)	Travma; Τραύμα (1997)	Antidoto (1998)

Singles from Travma
- 1. "Travma" Released: 16 April 1997; 2. "Eki" Released: May 1997; 3. "Siga!" Released: June 1997; 4. "Se Thelo, Me Thelis" Released: August 1997; 5. "Mavra Gialia" Released: September 1997; 6. "Na 'Se Kala" Released: October 1997; 7. "Ntrepome" Released: November 1997

Travma (Greek: Τραύμα; English: Trauma) is the 18th studio album by Greek singer, Anna Vissi. It was released on 16 April 1997 by Sony Music Greece. The album was certified gold within 12 days and eventually achieved triple-platinum certification for the sale of 180,000 units. It was the best-selling album of the year and one of the best-selling albums of the 1990s. The album also includes a duet with Greek pop singer, Sakis Rouvas.

== Rerelease ==
Travma was released in Australia with English-language liner notes and packaging in mid-1997 to help promote the Australian tour of the Trauma and her recent English-language single debut, "Forgive Me This". The album was released in a special tour edition featuring a bonus disc with five songs from previous albums. Vissi promoted the album and tour by participating in a high-profile media campaign including press, radio, national television interviews, and in-store signings.

In 2008, Greek newspaper Isotimia was granted permission to release Travma as a covermount, parting its Megales Ihografiseis ("Great recordings") series of selected albums of Greek recording artists. In 2019, the album was selected for inclusion in the Panik Gold box set The Legendary Recordings 1982-2019. The release came after Panik's acquisition rights of Vissi's back catalogue from her previous record company Sony Music Greece. This box set was printed on a limited edition of 500 copies containing CD releases of all of her albums from 1982 to 2019 plus unreleased material.

In late 2025, Sony Music Greece announced a coloured vinyl limited reissue, as part of the Rainbow Collection, released for pre-order as a collector's item. A meet-and-greet, scheduled for December 12, was then attended by 150 fans, who were able to have their own copies personally signed by the artist.

== Tracklist ==
All tracks are written by Nikos Karvelas (except lyrics for tracks 4, 5 and 10).

Disc 1
No.	Title	Lyrics	Length
1.	"Travma" (Τραύμα; Trauma)		4:32
2.	"Ekei" (Εκεί; There)		4:46
3.	"Drepomai" (Ντρέπομαι; I'm ashamed)		3:49
4.	"Siga!" (Σιγά!; Easy!)	Natalia Germanou	3:28
5.	"Na 'sai kala" (Να 'σαι καλά; Thank you)	Natalia Germanou	4:04
6.	"To katalaves?" (Το κατάλαβες;; Got it?)		3:54
7.	"Me noiazei" (Με νοιάζει; I care)		4:40
8.	"Mavra gialia" (Μαύρα γυαλιά; Black sunglasses)		4:31
9.	"Eprepe" (Έπρεπε; I should have)		3:37
10.	"Apolito keno" (Απόλυτο κενό; Absolute emptiness)	Natalia Germanou	5:05
11.	"To megalitero souxe" (Το μεγαλύτερο σουξέ; The biggest hit)		3:14
12.	"Thanatos einai i agapi" (Θάνατος είναι η αγάπη; Love is death)		4:51
13.	"Me halaei" (Με χαλάει; It spoils me)		3:12
14.	"Se thelo, me rheleis (ft. Sakis Rouvas)" (Σε θέλω, με θέλεις; I want you, you want me)		4:36
15.	"Se thimame" (Σε Θυμάμαι; I remember you)		3:43
Total length:			1:02:02

== Singles ==
The following singles were officially released to radio stations, some of them with music videos, and gained massive airplay.

1. "Travma" (Trauma)
2. "Eki" (There)
3. "Siga!" (Easy!)
4. "Se thelo, me theleis" (I want you, you want me)
5. "Mavra gialia" (Black sunglasses)
6. "Na 'sai kala" (Thank you)
7. "Drepome" (I'm ashamed)

== Australian release ==
Disc 1

1. "Travma"
2. "Eki"
3. "Ntrepome"
4. "Siga!"
5. "Na' Sai Kala"
6. "To Katalaves?"
7. "Me Niazi"
8. "Mavra Gialia"
9. "Eprepe"
10. "Apolito Keno"
11. "To Megalitero Souxe"
12. "Thanatos Ine I Agapi"
13. "Me Halai"
14. "Se Thelo, Me Thelis" (Duet with Sakis Rouvas)
15. "Se Thimame"

Disc 2 [Bonus]

1. "Sentonia" (from the album Klima Tropiko)
2. "Trelenome" (from the album Klima Tropiko)
3. "Amin" (from the album Re!)
4. "Dodeka" (from the album Kati Simveni)
5. "Lambo" (from the album Lambo)

== Credits ==
Credits adapted from liner notes.

=== Personnel ===
- George Aggelopoulos – drums (15)
- Christine Anagnostopoulou – backing vocals (1, 4, 9, 11, 13)
- Joey Balin – orchestration, programming, keyboards, guitars (8, 12)
- Nikos Chatzopoulos – violin (3, 6, 10)
- Ahilleas Diamantis – guitars (12)
- Vasilis Eleftheropoulos – backing vocals (1, 4, 9, 11, 13)
- Natalia Germanou – backing vocals (1, 4, 9, 11, 13)
- Spyros Glenis – percussion (1, 2, 3, 4, 6, 11, 13, 14, 15)
- Nikos Karvelas – orchestration (1, 2, 3, 4, 5, 6, 11, 13, 14, 15) / keyboards (1, 4) / guitars (3, 4, 5, 6, 7, 9, 10, 11, 13, 14, 15) / backing vocals (1, 4, 9, 11, 13) / second vocal (6)
- Christos Kemanetzidis – orchestration, programming, keyboards (7, 9, 10)
- Takis Kouvatseas – drums (1, 2, 3, 4, 5, 6, 10, 11, 13, 14)
- Konstantinos Manis – backing vocals (1, 4, 9, 11, 13)
- Kostas Miliotakis – keyboards (6, 13, 14)
- Yiannis Lionakis – keyboards (9) / guitars (1, 2, 4, 5, 7, 9, 10, 14, 15) / bouzouki (1, 5, 11, 14) / cura (2, 3, 4, 6, 9, 13) / baglama (3, 5) / lute (4) / oud (1)
- Andreas Mouzakis – drums (8, 12)
- Vasilis Nikolopoulos – programming, keyboards (12)
- Alexander Paraskevopoulos – bass (8, 12)
- Panayiotis Stergiou – cura (7, 10, 15) / baglama (10) / oud (10, 15)
- George Tsolakos – keyboards (1, 2, 3, 4, 5, 6, 11, 13, 14, 15)
- Simon Uarke – programming, keyboards (8)
- Nikos Vardis – bass (1, 2, 3, 4, 5, 6, 11, 13, 14, 15)
- Thanasis Vasilopoulos – clarinet (1, 14)
- Anna Vissi – backing vocals (1, 4, 9, 11, 13)

=== Production ===
- Yiannis Aggelakis – make up
- Tasos Bakasietas – sound engineer, mix engineer (8, 12)
- Joey Balin – production manager (8, 12)
- Antonis Glykos – artwork
- Yiannis Ioannidis (Digital Press Hellas) – mastering
- Efi Karabesini – photo processing
- Nikos Karvelas – production manager
- Apostolis Mihalis – photo processing
- Mihalis Orfanos – cover printing
- George Ragkos – sound engineer, mix engineer (1, 2, 3, 4, 5, 6, 7, 9, 10, 11, 13, 14, 15)
- Ronald Prent – sound engineer, mix engineer (8, 12)
- Peter Siakavellas (Digital Press Hellas) – mastering
- Stefanos Vasilakis – hair styling
- Anna Vissi – styling
- Tasos Vrettos – photographer

== Charts ==
Chart (1997)	Peak position	
Australian Albums (ARIA)	73	-
Cypriot Albums (All Records Top 20)	1	2×Platinum
Greek Albums (IFPI Greece)	1	3×Platinum
