= O! Kypros =

1995 studio album by Anna Vissi

Studio album by Anna Vissi
- Released: July 24, 1995
- Recorded: 1995
- Studio: Lumiere Studios (Cyprus), Aosis Studios (London)
- Genre: Folk music, traditional
- Label: Sony Music Greece/Columbia
- Producer: Anna Vissi/"O Fileleftheros"

Anna Vissi chronology
Re! (1994)	O! Kypros (1995)	Klima Tropiko (1996)

Singles from O! Kypros
- 1. "Ikosi Hronia" Released: July 1995

O! Kypros is the name of a Greek album by singer Anna Vissi released in Greece and Cyprus in 1995. The music featured is traditional Cypriot songs and is a dedication to her parents. A portion of the proceeds from the sale of the album went to help impoverished children in Cyprus. It is Anna Vissi's first release since 1981's Anna Vissi not to feature Nikos Karvelas either on the composition or on the production management.

The album was produced by Anna Vissi and the newspaper "O Fileleftheros", on behalf of the Cypriot Ministry of Education and Culture who co-funded the project. All proceeds would be donated to charity organizations in Cyprus.

A promotional video for "Ikosi Hronia" was released in Cyprus, to accompany the single release.

In 2019, the album was selected for inclusion in the Panik Gold box set The Legendary Recordings 1982-2019. The release came after Panik's acquisition rights of Vissi's back catalogue from her previous record company Sony Music Greece. This box set was printed on a limited edition of 500 copies containing CD releases of all of her albums from 1982 to 2019 plus unreleased material.

== Track listing ==
1. "To Giasemi" (The jasmine)
2. "To Tragoudi Tou Gamou" (The wedding song)
3. "Agapisa Ton Pou Karkias" (I loved him from heart)
4. "Psintri Vasilitzia Mou" (My delicate basil)
5. "I Vraka" (The breeches)
6. "Roula Mou Maroulla Mou" (My Roula, my Maroulla)
7. "Tessera Tzie Tessera" (Four plus four)
8. "I Tilirkotissa" (The girl from Tillyria)
9. "To Tertin Tis Kartoulas Mou" (The plight of my heart)
10. "Ikosi Hronia" (Twenty years)

== Music ==
All tracks are traditional songs of Cyprus, except for "Eikosi Hronia" written by Antros Papapavlou & Andreas Paraschos.

== Singles ==
- "Eikosi Hronia"

== Credits and personnel ==
Personnel

- Antros Papapavlou- arrangements, programming, keyboards
- Simon Mayor- mandolin
- Andreas Paraschos- lyrics (on track 10)
- Anna Vissi- vocals
- Dimos Beke- backing vocals
- Sofia Christophidou- backing vocals
- Sofia Karvela- backing vocals
- Nikos Karvelas- backing vocals (credited as "Nikos")
- Sakis Rouvas- backing vocals (credited as "Sakis")

Production

- Anna Vissi/"O Fileleftheros"/Sony Music - production management
- Lance Philips- recording engineer at Aosis Studios (London)
- Robin Hyman- assistant recording engineer
- Martyn ‘Max’ Heyes - recording engineering

Design

- Jonathan Glynnsmith- photos
- Yiannis Doxas - cover design
- Nikos Bitzanis- make up artist

Credits adapted from the album's liner notes.
