= Ode to the Gods =

Soundtrack album by Anna Vissi
- Released: 1993
- Recorded: October 1993
- Label: All

Anna Vissi chronology
Daimones (1991)	Ode to the Gods (1993)	Mala - I Mousiki Tou Anemou (2002)

Ode to the Gods is the name of an English soundtrack album to Stavros Sideras' 1993 one-act opera of the same name starring Greek Cypriot singer Anna Vissi. It is Anna Vissi's first English soundtrack album and was released in Cyprus and Greece in 1993 by Cypriot record company All Records. Vissi's co-stars included Labis Livieratos and Bessie Malfa, who perform on three tracks each. The opera was only staged once in October 1993 in Limassol under the auspices of the Government of Cyprus and played before Queen Elizabeth II and Her Excellencies. Music and lyrics are by Stavros Sideras.

== Track listing ==
1. "Prologue"
2. "Overture"
3. "Aphrodite and Apollon"
4. "I Can't Sleep at Night"
5. "Pythia Is Here"
6. "Great Seer"
7. "The Prophesy"
8. "No Wait"
9. "Please Answer Our Prayer"
10. "Great Zeus"
11. "Have Mercy"
12. "Give Peace a Chance"
