= Kati Simveni =

Studio album by Anna Vissi
- Released: 12 September 1985
- Recorded: 1985
- Genre: Pop, laika
- Label: CBS Greece
- Producer: Nikos Karvelas

Anna Vissi chronology
Na 'Hes Kardia (1984)	Kati Simveni (1985)	I Epomeni Kinisi (1986)

Singles from Kati Simveni
- 1. "Dodeka" Released: 1985; 2. "San Ki Emena Kamia" Released: 1986

1992 CD Release
- Cover of the 1992 Na 'Hes Kardia and Kati Simveni joint package. All tracks of both albums were first released on one single CD for the Greek market.

Kati Simveni (Greek: Κάτι Συμβαίνει; English: Something Happens, Something's Happening) is the name of a Greek album by singer Anna Vissi. The album was released in Greece and Cyprus by CBS Greece in 1985. This album includes her signature song "Dodeka". The album reached gold status.

== Background ==
Na 'Hes Kardia's moderate chart performance during its first year of release brought sceptiscism to Vissi's label executives over Nikos Karvelas's competence to produce a successful album on his own. As a member of the production team instead, Greek composer and musician Antonis Vardis was recruited, in an attempt to diversify the sound of the new album, as to appeal to younger generations. Vardis was already a well-known musician, having collaborated with top-profile artists, such as George Dalaras, Haris Alexiou, Vasilis Papakonstantinou, Dimitra Galani and Giannis Poulopoulos and also helping new artists being introduced to the audience, like Manolis Lidakis and Eleni Dimou. He was also an old partner to Vissi, collaborating on her shows in Plaka, Athens during mid-70s and, thus, contributing songs for her debut album As Kanoume Apopse Mian Arhi. Vardis and Karvelas shared the creative part equally, composing five songs each, though most part of the production was undertook and supervised by Vardis himself. "Dodeka" was the only track produced by Karvelas, who is also credited with composing and arranging all instruments. Lyrics were penned by Sarantis Alivizatos, Manos Koufianakis, Nikos Karvelas, Anna Vissi and Filippos Nikolaou.

=== Release ===
Though the album was first released on vinyl LP and cassettes in September 1985, five tracks made it into the digital release of next Vissi's album I Epomeni Kinisi in late 1987 as bonus tracks. Those tracks were: "Dodeka", "San Ke Mena Kamia", "Kati Simveni", "Ti Eho Na Haso", "Ki Omos Ehis Figi", as appeared on the CD's track listing, meaning they were among the first songs in Greece ever to be released on the newly-then marketed format.

The full album was officially released on CD format in 1992 as a joint package with 1984's album Na 'Hes Kardia. In 1996 a stand-alone release was scheduled as a part of the OK! Budget Price series Sony Music Greece launched at the time.

In 2019, the album was selected for inclusion in the Panik Gold box set The Legendary Recordings 1982-2019. The release came after Panik's acquisition rights of Vissi's back catalogue from her previous record company Sony Music Greece. This box set was printed on a limited edition of 500 copies containing CD releases of all of her albums from 1982 to 2019 plus unreleased material.

=== Reception ===
The first single "Dodeka" peaked on the radio stations almost immediately and soon became number one. It would become her signature song and is considered a classic song of pop music in Greece.

Second single "San Ke Mena Kamia" also had the success of "Dodeka" by reaching number one. Both tracks were released on a promotional vinyl 45 rpm disc in 1985.

=== Covers ===
Anna Vissi released live recordings of her songs "Dodeka" and "San kai mena kamia" in her 1993 and 2004 live albums. Also a "Dodeka" video clip was shot live in Asteria Night Club in 2000, and a "Dodeka/Den Thelo Na Ksereis" medley video clip was shot to promote her 2004 Live album.

The song "Ki Omos Ehis Figi" was covered in 1999 by Greek singer Elli Kokkinou for her debut studio album Epikindyna Paihnidia.

== Track listing ==
1. "Kati Simveni" (Something's going on)
2. "Ti Eho Na Haso" (What do I have to lose)
3. "Ki Omos Ehis Figi" (But you're gone)
4. "Agapa Me" (Love me)
5. "Otan Tha'Rthis" (When you will come back)
6. "Dodeka" (Twelve o'clock)
7. "San Ke Mena Kamia" (No-one like me)
8. "O,ti Ki An Pis" (Whatever you say)
9. "Ke Se Girevo" (I'm looking for you)
10. "Pali Horizoume" (We break up again)

== Credits and Personnel ==
Personnel

- Markos Alexiou - piano
- Charalambos Laskarakis - guitars
- Giorgos Magklaras - violin
- Makis Mavropoulos - tzouras
- Nikos Baxevanis - accordion
- Dimitris Papadimitriou - synthesizers
- Giorgos Tsoupakis - drums
- Philippos Tsemberoulis - flute, clarinet, saxophone
- Nikos Vardis - bass
- Lefteris Zervas - violin
- Sarantis Alivizatos - lyrics
- Nikos Karvelas - music, lyrics, piano, synthesizers
- Manos Koufianakis - lyrics
- Philippos Nikolaou - lyrics
- Antonis Vardis - music, lyrics, guitars, backing vocals
- Anna Vissi - vocals

Production

- Nikos Karvelas, Stelios Lazarou/Sony Music - production management
- Antonis Vardis - arrangements, instrumentations
- Nikos Karvelas - arrangements and instrument playing on track “Dodeka”
- Akis Golfidis - recording engineering, mixing at Studio Sierra

Design

- Alinda Mavrogenis - photos
- Studio 31 - cover design

Credits adapted from the album's liner notes.
