= Anna Vissi =

Greek Cypriot singer (born 1957)

- Άννα Βίσση
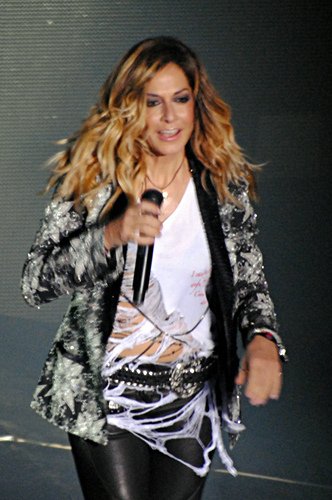
- Anna Vissi in 2011
- Born: 20 December 1957 (age 68); Larnaca, Cyprus
- Occupations: Singer; songwriter
- Years active: 1973–present
- Spouse: Nikos Karvelas (m. 1983; div. 1992)
- Children: 1
- Relatives: Lia Vissi (sister)
- Musical career
- Origin: Cyprus
- Genres: Laïko; pop; dance; entehno; pop rock
- Instrument: Vocals
- Labels: Minos (1973–1978); EMI Greece (1979–1982); CarVi (1982–1983); Sony Music Greece (1984–2013); Moda/Vanilla (2005–2006); Vanilla (her own label) (2010–); Panik Gold (2013–)
- Website: annavissilive.com

Anna Vissi (Greek: Άννα Βίσση, pronounced [ˈana ˈvisi], locally [ˈanːa ˈviʃːi]; born 20 December 1957) is a Greek Cypriot singer. She studied music at conservatories and performed locally before moving to the professional scene in Athens, in 1973, where she signed with Minos and simultaneously collaborated with other musical artists and released promotional singles of her own while studying at the University of Athens. She has represented Greece in the Eurovision Song Contest in 1980 and 2006, and Cyprus in 1982.

Vissi established herself in the recording industry by winning the Thessaloniki Song Festival in 1977 with the song "As Kanoume Apopse Mian Arhi" and releasing the eponymous debut album. Since the 1980s, Vissi began a nearly exclusive collaboration with songwriter Nikos Karvelas, to whom she was married from 1983 to 1992 and had one child with, resulting in one of the most successful music partnerships in the nation's history. Together they created the label CarVi, which resulted in legal issues with EMI Greece, and they then moved to CBS Records Greece, which later became Sony Music Greece.

Over the course of her career she has released over two dozen albums, most of which have been certified at least gold in the two countries and has also starred in three theatrical productions and briefly ventured into television and radio. Vissi experimented with different styles of music; after becoming one of the first Greek artists to introduce Western pop and dance elements into Greek laïko and entehno, she became one of the most prominent portrayers of the laïko-pop hybrid genre and culture that was thriving from the mid-1990s into the mid-2000s. She landed her biggest commercial success with Fotia (1989), followed by the double Kravgi (2000), which became the eighth best-selling album of all time in terms of units, while five others – Kitrino Galazio (1979), I Epomeni Kinisi (1985), Klima Tropiko (1996), Travma (1997), and Antidoto (1998) – have also achieved six figure sales.

She has a large number of successful singles most of which have become classics, including "Inai Kati Stigmes", "Tha Borousa", "Dodeka", "Methismeni Politia", "Oso Exo Foni", "Pragmata", "Agapi Ipervoliki", "Psihedelia", "Ta Mathitika Hronia", "Treno", "Stin Pira", "Atmosfaira Ilektrismeni", "Gkazi" and many many more. Through the years she kept a strong fan base, sold-out tours and shows (as was her latest shows in Rex in winter 2011–12 and Hotel Ermou 2015–2016 which was the most successful of the year).

Since the late 1990s, Vissi has also made attempts at establishing a career abroad, most of which fell through and have had some negative repercussions on her career in Cyprus and Greece. However, she struck some success with her 2005 single "Call Me", which made her the first Greek or Cypriot artist to top the US Billboard Hot Dance Club Play Chart.

Vissi has won six Arion Music Awards, 15 Pop Corn Music Awards, and nine MAD Video Music Awards. Vissi has received 37 Platinum and 16 Gold certifications from IFPI Greece and has become the country's best-selling artists of all time, having sold over 30 million records worldwide and is one of the country's top earning artists. Alpha TV ranked Vissi as the second top-certified female artist in Greece in the phonographic era (since 1960), behind Haris Alexiou, while Forbes listed her as the 15th most powerful and influential celebrity in Greece and fourth highest ranked singer.

== Biography ==
=== Early life ===
Anna Vissi was born on 20 December 1957 in Larnaca. She began singing from a very early age, starting her formal musical studies at the age of six at a local conservatory.

At the age of twelve she entered a talent competition and won first prize. Two years later, she was the main singer at Ayia Tilliria, which was also her first TV appearance. In 1973, her family moved to Athens, where she was able to pursue her studies at the National Conservatory. She would eventually appear with a number of well-known Greek singers, such as George Dalaras, Haris Alexiou, and Vasilis Papakonstantinou, in the famous nightclubs of Plaka, in Athens. Her first important collaboration, alongside George Dalaras, was with composer Stavros Koujioumtzis. Koujioumtzis composed two songs for Vissi, "S' Agapo" ("I Love You") and "Sta Hronia tis Ipomonis" ("In The Years of Patience"). She also collaborated with many important Greek composers such as Mikis Theodorakis (1974/1975), Georgios Hadjinassios (1974), Doros Giorgiadis (1974), Nikos Karvelas (who later became her husband; 1975) and Mihalis Terzis (1976).

=== Career beginnings ===
In 1977, she went on tour with George Dalaras and Haris Alexiou, giving concerts with the most notable at the Rainbow, London (June). In the same year, she released her first studio album named As Kanoume Apopse Mian Arhi and won the prize for best singer and best song ("As Kanoume Apopse Mian Arhi") of the year at the Annual Song Festival of Thessaloniki (Palais des Sports). In 1978 she was proposed by ERT (Greek National Television) to represent Greece at the 23rd Eurovision Song Contest. There were two candidate songs: "Poso S' Agapo" and "O Kyrios Nobel". Finally, due to controversies between the composers of the songs, her participation was disqualified and Tania Tsanaklidou went to the contest. Her second album Kitrino Galazio was released in 1979 and produced the hit "Aftos Pou Perimeno" ("The one I'm waiting for"). The album reached platinum status and became the best-selling record of the year in Greece.

=== 1980–1982: Eurovision Song Contest and album releases ===
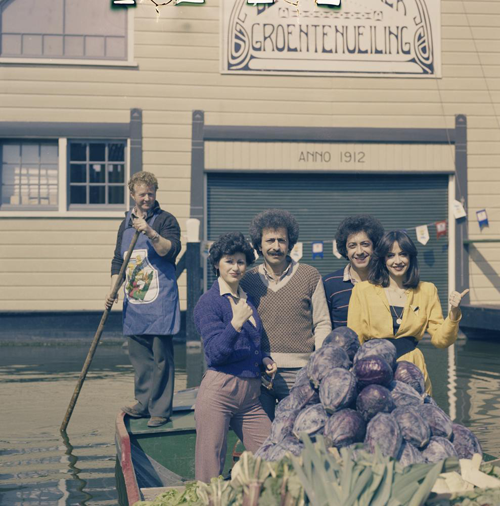
Anna Vissi (right) and her backing group The Epikouri at a photoshoot for the Eurovision Song Contest 1980

In 1980, Vissi participated in the 25th Eurovision Song Contest representing Greece with the song "Autostop" ("Hitch-Hike"), finishing 13th with 30 points. In the same year she released her third album Nai ("Yes") reaching gold status with 50,000 units sold. The album produced the hits "Oso Eho Foni" ("As long as I have my voice") and "Methysmeni Politeia" ("Drunken state"). One year later her fourth, self-titled album Anna Vissi was released, reaching gold status. In 1982, she represented her native Cyprus at the 27th Eurovision Song Contest with the song "Mono i agapi" ("Only love"), which ended fifth with 85 points scoring Cyprus its second highest position to date. The English version of "Mono i agapi", released as a 7-inch single in 1982, titled "Love Is A Lonely Weekend" and its B-side "I'm Gonna Be A Fool for You" remain unreleased on CD. The same year in December she released her limited run fifth studio album Eimai To Simera Kai Eisai To Chthes by the short-lived record label Vissi and Nikos Karvelas formed for the release known as CarVi, whose name was a combination of their last names.

=== 1983–1989: Collaboration with Nikos Karvelas ===
In May 1983, she married Nikos Karvelas, a composer and law graduate, with whom she collaborated in 1975 and in November she gave birth to her daughter Sofia. After their marriage, she started a close collaboration with Karvelas. Since 1975, all her releases have become gold or platinum and have included songs by Karvelas. In 1986, she participated at the Cypriot National Final for Eurovision Song Contest with the song "Thelo Na Gino Star" ("I Want To Be A Star"), taking second place.

In 1984, Vissi left EMI Greece and signed with CBS Records Greece, which later became Sony Music Greece, a collaboration that lasted until 2013. In March 1984, she released Na 'Hes Kardia (If You Had a Heart). The album was certified gold. The following year her seventh album Kati Simveni ("Something Is Happening") was released which included one of her most famous songs, titled "Dodeka" ("Twelve (O'Clock)") and reached gold status selling 80.000 units. In 1986 I Epomeni Kinisi (The Next Move) was released. The album included the hit "Pragmata" ("Things") and went platinum, becoming the best selling record of the year. In February 1988, she released her ninth album Tora (Now) and in December the album Empnefsi! (Inspiration!) which went gold.

In 1988, she made her debut as a radio producer on ANT1 Radio. Her radio program was titled after one of her songs "Ta Koritsia Einai Atakta" ("Girls Are Naughty") and was aired every weekend. In the same year, she participated with the song "Klaio" ("I'm Crying") at the Greek National Final for Eurovision Song Contest, finishing third. In 1989, she released the successful studio album Fotia (Fire), being one of the first albums to feature western sounds. The lead single "Pseftika" ("Fake") became a hit and the album reached platinum status, selling 180.000 copies and becoming the second best selling record of 1990. She performed at Diogenis Palace in that same year, Athens's biggest nightclub/music hall at the time.

=== 1990–1995: Theatrical work and television ===
Vissi in Daimones.

In the early 1990s, she continued performing around Greece with Nikos Karvelas, with appearances at "Diogenis Palace" and then at "Rex". In November 1991, Vissi and Karvelas starred in the first Greek rock opera, Daimones ("Demons"). Vissi described it as an "artistic achievement" in her career; however, the play received mostly negative reviews from professional critics and contributed to the relatively unsuccessful period Vissi faced in the early 1990s. A year later, in October 1993, Vissi landed the leading role of Aphrodite, in the one-act opera Ode to the Gods by Stavros Sideras. It was held only once in Limassol, Cyprus, during the celebrations for the Commonwealth Day. Over the following years, Karvelas and Vissi released the albums Lambo (1992), Emeis (1992), Live! (1993), Re! (1994), and O! Kypros (1995), an album with traditional Cypriot songs.

In 1994, she was the hostess on the ANT1 weekly TV show Me Agapi, Anna. The show was cancelled and in 2008 the production company filed a lawsuit against Vissi claiming "unprofessional behavior of the singer" because the agreement was for 40 episodes and Vissi dropped out after 10 episodes. The legal conflict between Vissi and the production company appeared to come to an end when the Court of Appeal of Athens led to the final compromise of the two sides to the sum of €400,000. A sum that the singer would supposed to pay in the company against the initial sum of 2.3 million Euros. Vissi was vindicated by the decision of Supreme Court that halved the €400,000 that Vissi was ultimately required to pay.

=== 1996–1998: Klima Tropiko, Travma, and Antidoto ===
In February 1996, Vissi released the triple-platinum album Klima Tropiko. The album featured a new sound for Anna Vissi. It has sold 105 thousand copies as of 2009. After giving more than 40 concerts all over Greece, she started winter appearances at club "Chaos". In February 1997, Vissi won three Greek Music Awards: Best Female Singer, Best Interpretation, and Biggest Airplay Song.

In April 1997, Vissi released Travma which went gold in twelve days and triple platinum in six months, eventually selling 170 thousand copies.

For the winter of 1997–1998, Vissi made appearances at club Gazi. On New Year's Eve, by invitation of the Mayor of Athens, she performed in the Parliament Square in front of more than 20,000 people, an event which was broadcast on TV all over Greece and Cyprus. In March 1998, Vissi broke a record, winning seven Greek Music Awards for her album Travma.

A couple of months later, a new CD single was released with the songs "Crush", "Mavra Gyalia" and "Eleni", as well as a re-release of her multi-platinum album Travma, with a bonus CD containing songs from previous albums, only in Australia.

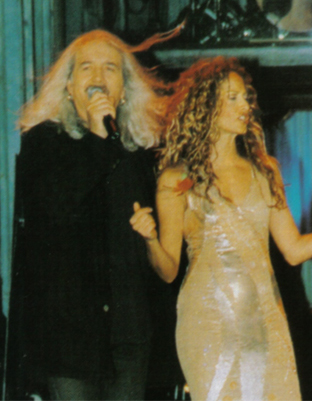
Vissi and Karvelas performing at Asteria in 1998.

In April 1998, Vissi released her album titled Antidoto, which sold more than 80,000 copies in just a week, breaking all previous records to that point. The album eventually achieved triple platinum status, having sold 130 thousand copies as of 2009. During the summer of 1998, Vissi presented a show at club "Asteria".

Later that year, Vissi gave a charity concert at the Presidential Palace in Cyprus, with the presidential orchestra of the Russian Confederacy (Telethon) and continued with two concerts in London, in February 1999 (Forum Music Theatre, Palladium Theatre). Shortly after, there was also a mini-tour in the US, giving concerts in Los Angeles, Atlantic City, Chicago, Boston and New York (Madison Square Garden).

In New York City, Vissi performed a mini-concert for her fans at the Virgin Megastore in Times Square. This performance was part of a series of events hosted by the Virgin Megastore, promoting some of the world's biggest stars, with Vissi being the only Greek singer to receive this honour. The event was promoted throughout the tri-state area by KTU (radio station) and was part of "Anna Vissi day" at the biggest Virgin Megastore in the USA.

=== 2000–2001: Performances and Everything I Am and Kravgi ===
Followed by a short break from music, in April 2000 Vissi performed at London's Royal Albert Hall, at the so-called "millennium show," singing in front of people from Sony International, marketing managers from Europe, and fans from the United Kingdom.

On 13 May 2000, she performed as a special guest star in her native Cyprus, at the 49th annual Miss Universe Pageant which took place at the Eleftheria Stadium in Nicosia. She sang for the very first time her song "On a Night Like This", a song who turned world famous at the version record by Kylie Minogue and included in Minogue's album Light Years

Some months later, her first international single was released titled "Everything I Am", containing the original version and three remixes of the song (Almighty Mix, Eiffel 65 RMX, Groove Brothers Remix), and a song with both Greek and English lyrics called "Moro Mou, No Tomorrow". She also filmed her first music video of a song off that single, directed by Antti Jokinen (Solar films, Finland), that cost 80,000,000 drachmas (US$310,000).

Apart from the English-language single, she also released the Greek-language single "Agapi Ipervoliki" on an EP of the same name containing six new songs. It became triple platinum and finally settled at four-times platinum. To promote the single, she started appearances at "Asteria" club with Karvelas and the boy band ONE, with Shaun Fernandez as the choreographer.

In September 2000, she gave a charity concert at the GSP Stadium in Nicosia, in front of 12,000 people, with ONE and a group of dancers from Sony International. At the same year, she released her internationally distributed English-language album Everything I Am, which although started as ambition effort to launch an international career. A week after its release in Greece, the album reached gold status (20,000+ copies), while Australia, South Africa, Spain, Italy, France, Germany, Turkey, Finland, Norway, and Asia started to promote it with little success.

In November 2000, Kravgi was released. It was a double album with 24 new songs and included a duet with Katy Garbi. It reached 3× platinum status in one month, setting a record, and eventually went seven-times platinum, having sold 175 thousand copies (350 thousand units) as of 2009, making it the best-selling album of the 2000s decade and the eighth best-selling of all time in terms of unit sales in Greece.

Some months later, she started appearances with Garbi and ONE at "Fever", while she accepted the invitation of the Mayor of Athens to perform in the Parliament Square, at the celebrations of the 2001 New Year's Eve.

On 6 June 2001, she was the main singer in a production in Bucharest (Unirii square, nearby river Dambovitei) along with the No Smoking band and the cinema director and producer Emir Kusturica. The concert (2001, Peace Odyssey) included a multimedia show, opening with a water screen. More than 150,000 people were present. Kusturica along with producer and director Angelos Hadjiandreou undertook the artistic direction of the event, marrying music with the most modern expression of art.

Three months later, on 5 September 2001, she gave a concert in Cyprus (GSP Stadium), singing in front of more than 18,000 viewers, for more than three hours where she was awarded for the seven-times platinum Kravgi.

=== 2002–2004: Mala, Chi, and Paraksenes Eikones ===
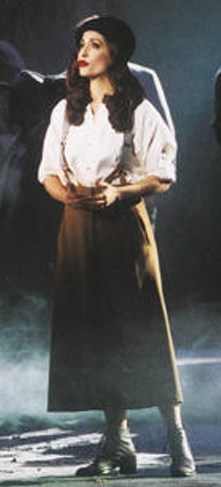
Vissi in Mala – I Mousiki Tou Anemou.

In early 2002, Vissi starred in the musical Mala – I Mousiki Tou Anemou, based on a true love story that took place during World War II in Auschwitz, between Mala Zimetbaum and Edward Galiñski. The play, which was staged at Pallas Theatre in Athens, it was written by Karvelas, directed by Giannis Kakleas and was accompanied by a symphony orchestra conducted by Giorgos Niarhos. Mala premiered on 19 January. The production and Vissi's performance was praised by critics, although some of them found it hard to accept that the biggest pop star of Greece was giving the audience such a well made artistic spectacle. Pallas Theatre was sold out through the play's 3 month run.

The musical was shown on Mega Channel a year later. An album containing the songs performed at the play was also released and charted, reaching gold status in Greece and platinum in Cyprus.

In late 2002, Vissi released the album Chi, which was produced by George De Angelis. Shortly after, the album was featured on CNN's Music Room, where they talked about how the album reached number one in Greece. The album quickly reached number one on the IFPI charts, and was certified 2× platinum. In the winter of 2002–2003, she was working at "Fever" club in Athens, performing with Yiannis Parios.

In May 2003, Vissi performed with Nikos Karvelas and Irini Merkouri at "Boom" in Thessaloniki. On 15 July 2003, Vissi gave a concert at "A Plaz Voulas/Apollonies Aktes", with special guest star Nikos Karvelas. In September 2003, Vissi gave another concert in Cyprus, at the Tzirion Stadium in Limassol, to celebrate her 30-year-old career. At the same year, she was awarded with a prize for her whole contribution from the Cyprus Paralympic Organization, while a square in Larnaca was named after her. She also met and talked with the president of the Republic of Cyprus, in the Presidential Palace, in Nicosia.

Just before 2004, on 5 December 2003, Vissi released the double album Paraksenes Eikones which went 2× platinum in six months. This was Vissi's first album since 1981's Anna Vissi that included songs written by other composers besides Nikos Karvelas. The album produced many hits. To promote the album, she started appearing at "Diogenis Studio" for the winter season 2003–2004, with Konstantinos Christoforou, Nino and girl band Hi-5.

=== 2004–2005: Call Me and Nylon ===
On 31 March 2004, Vissi performed in the Liberty Square in Nicosia, at a concert part of the celebrations for Cyprus's entry at the European Union, after an official invitation from the Republic of Cyprus. In May 2004, she went on a small tour in England and the United States, with Labis Livieratos (with whom she collaborated in the early 1990s), while in July, her album Paraksenes Eikones was re-released with a bonus CD single called Remixes 2004, which went gold.

On 29 August 2004, Vissi performed at the closing ceremony of the XXVIII Olympiad, in Athens. She then gave a concert in Cyprus on 3 September, at the GSP Stadium in Nicosia, where she sang for the first time her new English song called "Call Me".

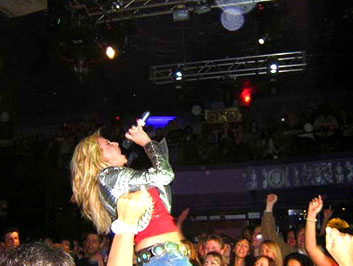
Vissi performing in a club in the United States, part of her promotional tour for "Call Me".

On 20 December 2004, Vissi released a live album and DVD, which went platinum in its first week of release. It sold 40 thousand copies. After that concert, she moved to the United States, for the preparation and promotion of her single "Call Me". In the United States, the single was released by Moda Records, which, during its collaboration with Vissi, was called Vanilla/Moda Records. It features twelve remixes, and went to number one on the Billboard Hot Dance Music Club Play chart and number two on the Billboard Hot Dance Airplay chart. Vissi then performed at the Copacabana in New York for the KTU PartyGras. During the winter and through to the summer of 2005, she went around to clubs as part of her Mini-USA Tour to promote "Call Me". Some of the clubs included "Central", "Mirage", "DNA", "The Sound Garden" and "Studio 9".

In July 2005, Vissi returned to Greece and released "Call Me" as a CD single by Sony BMG, along with a new English-language song titled "Lie". The single reached number one on the IFPI singles charts and achieved gold certification. In that same month, Vissi started recording her new Greek album. In August 2005, she took to the stage of the "Coca-Cola Sound-Wave", which was held in Mykonos. There she sang her new English song "Lie" and surprised fans and media by appearing on stage with half her head shaved. This performance was considered by many to be her comeback to the Greek music scene after an absence of more than a year.

On 27 September 2005, Vissi released a new Greek album titled Nylon. The album went platinum within 24 hours of its release and peaked at number one on the IFPI Greek Top 50 albums chart, selling 40 thousand copies. Shortly after, in October 2005, the album was released as a dual disc, the first ever to be released in Greece. The dual disc version featured special footage from her and Nikos Karvelas in the studio. In the album, there is a song featuring the lead singer of the Greek hip-hop band Goin' Through called "Erota I Polemo" ("Love or War"). On 24 November 2005, Vissi started performances at "Votanikos" club in Athens, Greece with Goin' Through, Dimitris Korgialas and Despina Olympiou, which lasted until March 2006.

=== 2006–2007: Eurovision Song Contest and World Tour ===
Greek national broadcaster ERT chose Vissi to represent Greece in the Eurovision Song Contest 2006. There were four candidate songs, which she sang during a song selection show on 14 March 2006 at "Votanikos" club. Greek viewers used televote and SMS messages along with a panel of judges to choose the song Vissi would sing in the Eurovision Song Contest 2006.

Two of the competing songs, were composed by Nikos Karvelas, namely "Everything" and "Who Cares about Love", with Vissi herself penning the lyrics to "Everything". The third song, "A Beautiful Night", was written by composing group Pigassos, while the last song, "Welcome to the Party", was written by Greek composer Dimitris Kontopoulos. "Everything" was selected as the entry song of Greece, winning 47.79% of the votes. The day after the final, Vissi filmed the song's music video. Her previous record label, Minos EMI, released a CD single of her two prior Eurovision entries "Autostop" and "Mono i agapi", shortly after.

After the filming of the song's music video was completed, Vissi embarked on a promotional tour across Europe starting on 12 April 2006 with Russia. She also visited Malta, Cyprus, Albania, Serbia & Montenegro, Romania, Spain, Netherlands, Sweden, Bosnia & Herzegovina, Belgium, and ended her tour on 10 May 2006 in Israel.

On 19 April 2006 she released a CD single for her Eurovision entry "Everything". It featured the original version of "Everything" and a remix of it by DJ Valentino and Christodoulos Siganos. She then also re-released Nylon as Nylon: Euro-Edition, which includes all of the songs from her album Nylon, as well as the entry song "Everything" in original, remixed and karaoke version. Euro Edition also contains the three other Greek Eurovision Preselection songs: "Beautiful Night", "Who Cares About Love" and "Welcome to the Party", which has entered the playlist of American satellite radio station "Sirius Beat".

During the contest, Vissi performed in the 16th spot of the night and appeared alone on stage, wearing a Jean-Paul Gaultier outfit. Although she had been one of the favourites during the pre-contest period, she only managed to get 9th place with 128 points (hers was one of the two pre-qualified entries to finish in the top 10, the other being Romania). The other eight songs were all qualified from the semi-final. Finland won the contest with the rock band Lordi and their song "Hard Rock Hallelujah". In interviews prior to the contest, she had stated that if there was anyone she would like to lose to, it would be the Finnish entry. Lordi had also expressed their liking of the Greek song in interviews.

Following the contest, "Everything" was released in Finland on 24 May 2006, by Sony BMG Finland. It had already been released in Sweden and it peaked at 24. It featured a different cover, than the original single. The dual disc version of Nylon was also re-released with the Eurovision single. Vissi gave a concert at London's Royal Albert Hall on 27 May 2006. She also had a concert on 8 September 2006 at G.S.P. Stadium in Nicosia, Cyprus, which kick-started her Greek mini-tour. The tour was called 'The Best of Anna Vissi 2006' and was covered by Alpha TV.

In the fall of 2006, she embarked on a Greek mini-tour, performing around Greece in sold-out concerts, as well as Cyprus with Goin' Through.

In the beginning of 2007, Vissi moved to Los Angeles, United States to start work on an English album. In February 2007, she accompanied longtime friend Patricia Field to the Academy Awards ceremony in Los Angeles, United States.

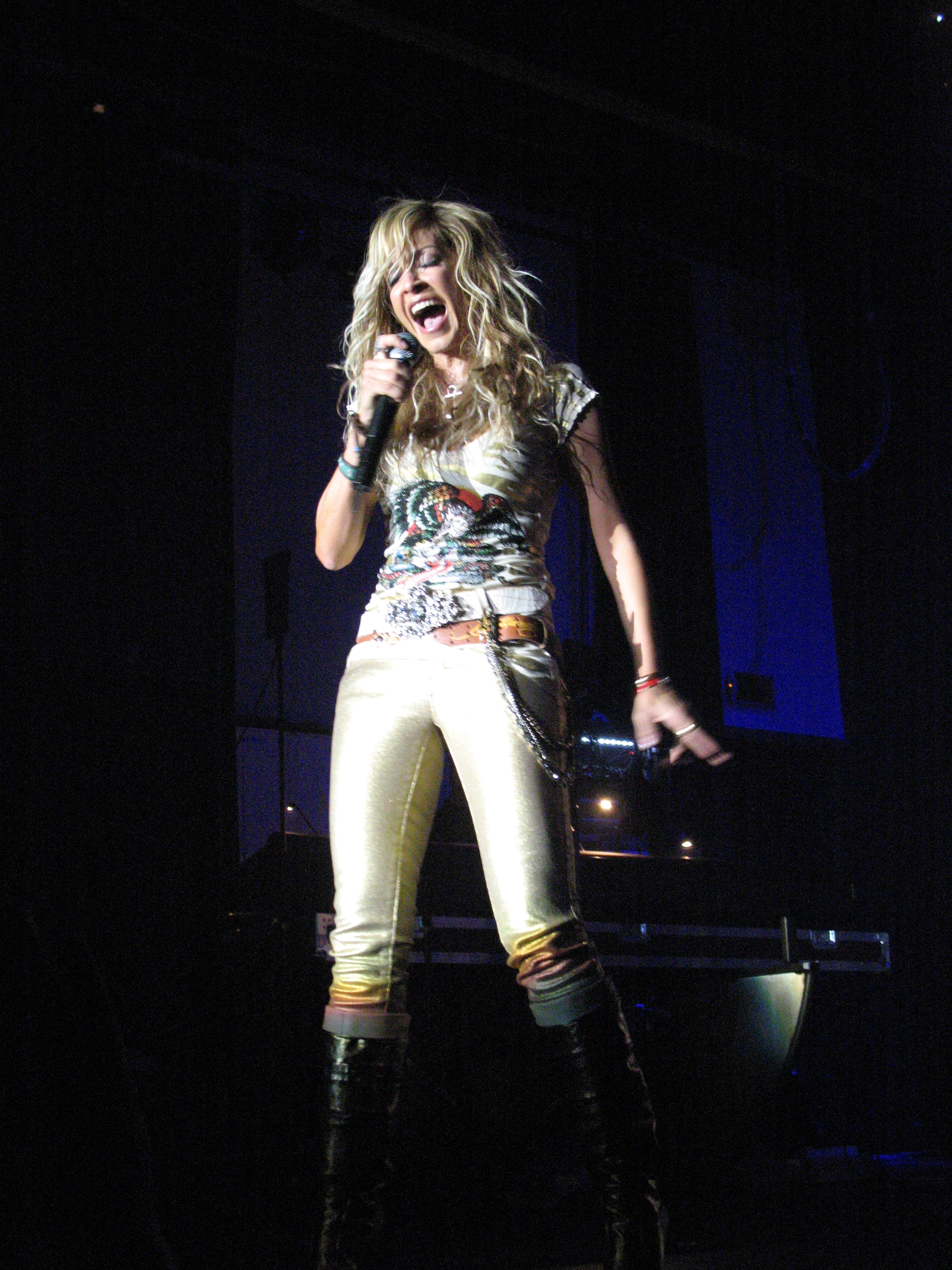
Vissi performing in Amsterdam in 2007.

Vissi also embarked on a world tour in January 2007. She travelled to Australia with Konstantinos Christoforou and had three concerts in Melbourne and Sydney, and from 10 April 2007 through 1 May 2007, she toured North America. Along with Takis Zacharatos, she performed in Chicago, New York City, Atlantic City, Connecticut (Foxwoods), Los Angeles, Montreal, and Toronto. Vissi continued her tour in October 2007 with a European mini-tour. The concerts included Amsterdam and Brussels with her concert in Paris being cancelled without an explanation. During the tour, she stated that she was only halfway through her world tour.

In September 2007, Sony BMG released a compilation titled The Essential Anna Vissi in select markets. The album contains seventeen tracks, including some of Vissi's biggest hits. It also includes the previously leaked, but unofficially released English song "Is it Safe?"

In November 2007, she held a special charity concert in London for the "Oinoussian Benevolent Fund". It was held at the "Royal Opera House" in Covent Garden with the London Philharmonic Orchestra and she raised £250,000, excluding the entrance tickets costing £200.

=== 2008–2009: Apagorevmeno ===
On New Year's Day, Vissi kicked off the new year by holding a large concert in Larnaca, Cyprus.

She spent a large portion of 2007 and 2008 recording her English album. In an interview with fans, she discussed the album, describing it as "a rock album with unbelievably nice songs, that some of the biggest people in the USA music industry worked on. It is an album that could only be made in the USA, that represents who I am, and I believe that this album will be a big plus in my career so far." It was revealed that the album will be released in the first half of 2009.

In February 2008, Vissi signed to Maple Jam Music Group for the management of the release of her upcoming Greek and English albums. In April 2008, MAD TV hosted a competition for its "Greek Week", in which visitors to their website were able to vote for their ten favourite Greek music videos, with the winners being showcased in a special "Greek Top 30 Countdown" on 20 April. Vissi was the most nominated artist with thirteen music videos, and managed to secure the number one position with "Treno", while "Agapi Ipervoliki" came in at number four when the top 30 were announced.

On 28 June 2008, Vissi posted the song "Diri Dakta", that had been recorded previously, on her official MySpace profile for her fans; the song did not appear on her new album. Later in the year, on 4 October 2008, Vissi held a charity gala at the Grosvenor House Hotel in London.

A bonus track from the Greek album was released on 29 October 2008, along with its music video. The song, titled "To Parelthon Mou" ("My Past"), is the title track to the Greek film Bank Bang, released in December 2008. The music video for the song was filmed on 22 October 2008, at The Mall Athens. With Cosmote sponsoring the album, three songs from the album were released on 26 November 2008, exclusively on the Cosmote online music store.

Vissi's Greek album Apagorevmeno was released on 9 December 2008, including songs by Patrick Leonard, Adam Cohen, Kara DioGuardi, Glen Ballard, Dan Wilson, Yiannis Kefonedes and Vissi herself. The production of this album was done by Vissi herself, Greg Ladanyi, Patrick Leonard, CJ Vanston and Yiannis Kefonedes. It was the first album since 1983 not to include any songs and, generally, any input by Nikos Karvelas. The reason she gave for this in an interview with "Down Town" magazine was that the two had got tired of each other, but clarified that this did not rule out a collaboration in the future. The album was certified gold in the first week of release, and reached number one on its second week on the charts before settling at 2× platinum status. In August 2009, Apagorevmeno became the first album to have four top 10 singles on the official Greek download chart by Billboard since the launch of the chart. As of April 2009, the album has sold 27 thousand copies.

As it happened in many cases throughout Vissi's career, she was criticized by some journalists. Eleftheros Typos cited the album as a relative commercial failure and furthered the commercial decline Vissi had faced in the 2000s. Although this was partially due to hardships faced by the Greek music industry including piracy, the 2008 financial crisis, and changing musical tastes, leading to a general decline of the laiko-pop scene and image-based singers, in an article about the "golden trio" of Greek pop, consisting of Vissi, Despina Vandi, and Sakis Rouvas, Anna Vlavianou of To Vima noted Vissi as having "the most vociferous" decline of the group. She cited several reasons for this, such as Vissi's unsuccessful result at Eurovision and long absences from Greece in pursuit of a career abroad at a relatively advanced age, leading to her losing a portion of her established Greek fanbase. Additionally, while in previous years the supposed rivalry between Vissi and Vandi drew heavy media attention, with the public curious as to who would come out on top, she cited Elena Paparizou as replacing both artists as top contemporary female in the latter half of the decade. Haris Simvoulidis of Avopolis also alleged that on Apagorevmeno Vissi appeared to be attempting to catch up to her contemporaries, Paparizou and Peggy Zina. Despite these comments, Apagorevmeno became the biggest selling album by a female artist in Greece for the year 2009.

On 24 February 2009, Vissi renewed her contract with Sony Music Greece.

Vissi had originally planned to start appearances at "Athinon Arena" in February 2009, as part of her comeback and for promotion of the new album, however, she decided to hold a concert in Athens during the summer, instead. The tour began in July 2009 and all appearances were sold out throughout Greece. The tour ended with a concert at GSP Stadium in Nicosia, Cyprus, on 25 September 2009; overall, the tour was a success for Vissi, who had not performed for the Greek audience in four years. On 16 November 2009, Apagorevmeno was re-released as Apagorevmeno+ with three new songs and two remixes in special ecological packaging.

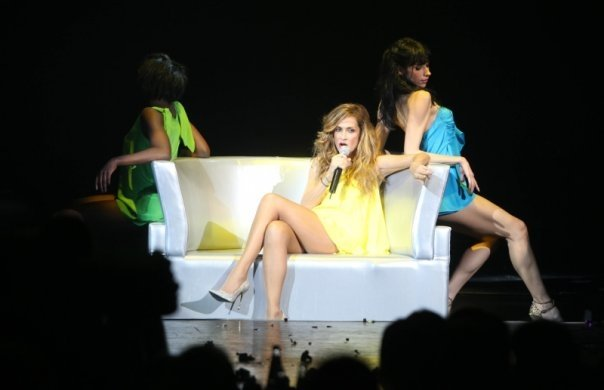
Vissi performing at Athinon Arena in 2010 during The Fabulous Show.

Vissi started appearances at "Athinon Arena" on 6 November 2009 with Greek band Ble, Yiorgos Sambanis, Mario, Vera Boufi, Elissavet Spanou, Michalis Zeis and DJ Dim Trik. The show was named "The Fabulous Show", after her then-latest single, "Fabulous", which was included in Apagorevmeno+. The show marked the comeback of Anna Vissi in the nightlife of Athens after four years of absence and received good reviews. Vissi was on stage for almost 4 hours every Thursday, Friday and Saturday until closing night on 20 March 2010. The show proved to be a huge success both artistically and commercially. After the run in Athens the show moved to Thessaloniki on 3 April 2010 with spectacular opening night attendance.

=== 2010–2011: Agapi Einai Esi, and Oso Eho Foni ===
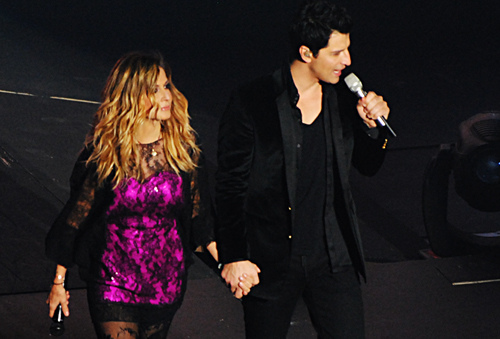
Vissi and Sakis Rouvas performing at Athinon Arena in 2011.

On 9 October 2010, Vissi released the single "Agapi Einai Esi". The music and lyrics are by Nikos Karvelas, the song being their first collaboration in four years. On 24 October, she released a three-track CD single titled "Agapi Einai Esi" packaged with newspaper "Real News" nationwide, while on 19 December she released the new studio album Agapi Einai Esi.

For the winter season 2010–11, Vissi teamed up with Sakis Rouvas for a concert series at Athinon Arean called Face2Face, beginning on 15 October,. This marked their first appearance and collaboration since they both appeared together at club Chaos in 1996, as well as being Vissi's second year in a row appearing at Athinon Arena. The show extended to 19 March, (as Rouvas was scheduled for surgery prior to his Easter solo shows) and was the most successful show of the season. In late December 2010, Vissi launched a songwriting contest for amateur writers to submit songs to her, which lasted until mid-February 2011.

Vissi released a documentary named "Oso Eho Foni" on Alpha TV on 30 March 2011. Described as a rockumentary by Vissi, she first confirmed she was filming with director and friend Christine Crokos in July 2010. The show, which Vissi has stated is not a reality show, focusses on Vissi's everyday life and include footage from the last three years, including her proceeds recording album, practising with Rouvas for the Face2Face show, and meetings with Jean Paul Gaultier and Dave Stewart. Vissi performed a charity concert at the OACA stadium on 15 April 2011 to raise money to save the amateur league Panathinaikos football team. On 27 April, Vissi gave a charity concert for the Sophia Foundation in Nicosia.

In May 2011, Vissi embarked on a North American & Canadian tour. On May in interview in Los Angeles said that she will do a concerts in Germany and Cyprus.

On 15 June 2011, Vissi began the European Tour and the first concert was to take place in Limassol, and two days later, on 17 June, in Bucharest. In September 2011 Vissi performed a mini-Cypriot tour titled Etsi Apla, performing four concerts. On 5 November 2011 Vissi performed in Stuttgart, Germany. On 12 November, Vissi was awarded by Hellenic Charity Ball who recognised the brightest arts and entertainment luminaries in the Greek-American community.The ceremony take place in San Francisco.

On 5 December, premiered exclusively released on Rythmos FM the first song "Mono an trelatho" ("Only if I go crazy").

=== Late 2011–2012: Dodeka, Tirannieme; other releases ===
On 16 December 2011, Vissi started appearing at club REX in a concert series titled "Dodeka" with Mairi Linta. The show is very successful and a lot of Greek celebrities and thousands of fans visit Rex every weekend to watch the best Vissi's show in all the 2000s. On 20 February, premiered on Rythmos FM the song "Ora na fevgo" ("Time to go").On 21 March, premiered on Rythmos FM the song "Mia nixta to poli" ("One night at most"). On 28 March, released the music video for "Ora na fevgo". On 27 May, premiered on Dromos FM the song "Tiraniemai".

On 28 June released the music video for "Tiraniemai" ("Tyranny"). The song reached the top Greek charts and Greek Airplays and came first in Greek iTunes charts. On 12 July, premiered on Lampsi FM the song "Venzini" ("Gasoline"). On 20 July, she released the five-track CD single "Tiraniemai" packaged with magazine Tiletheatis nationwide. The CD single features "Tiraniemai", a remix of "Tiraniemai", "Ora na Fevgo", "Mia Nihta to Poli", "Venzini", a remix of "Venzini" and the two music videos for "Ora na Fevgo" and "Tiraniemai". On August she began her 'Summer 2012' Tour in Greece.

=== Late 2012–2013: LAV, Access All Areas, Daimones remake ===
On 4 October premiered the song " Den Ine Psema" ("It's not a lie"). On 26 October 2012, Vissi started appearing at club Kentro Athinon in a concert series titled "LAV" with Nikos Zoidakis and Demy.

In late November 2012, Sony Music in co-operation with Minos-EMI released Access All Areas, a 5-CD compilation to mark Anna's 40-year musical career. The compilation included 84 songs from her first album As Kanoume Apopse Mian Arhi through her latest EP Tiraniemai. A 64-paged book accompanied the cds with previously unreleased photos of Anna by Christine Crokos. The release was a limited one, with initially only 500 numbered copies being issued in both Greece and Cyprus. All 500 copies were shipped on just three days, and the compilation was released in March 2013 with further 750 copies. The compilation reached no 3 on the official Greek IFPI charts.

Vissi released a Christmas song "Kala Christougenna" (Merry Christmas) to her fans as a gift from her official website on 13 December. and on her birthday, (20 December) she released a new song called "Protimo" (I prefer) written by Nikos Karvelas. On Valentine's Day, she released her new song "I Pio Megali Apati Ine O Erotas" ("The Biggest Fraud Is Love"). It is a ballad with only piano music and is also written by Nikos Karvelas.

On 22 March the rock opera Daimones premiered at Theater Pallas with 15 actors-dancers and 16 musicians and continued with success until 2 June. 10,000 tickets have been sold up before the premier, while, according to Elliniki Theamaton (the production company of Daimones) a total of 53,000 tickets have been sold until June, and was the biggest hit of the year! On the final day, Vissi announced that Demones will re-open on 5 October, for 10 more shows.

On 1 April 2013, after the economic crisis in Cyprus, Anna Vissi among other 49 artists appeared in Nicosia in a concert with the aim to help people in need by requesting clothes, food and medicine instead of tickets. Vissi sung her own songs "Sta Hronia Tis Ipomonis", "As Kanoume Apopse Mian Arhi" and "Dodeka" as well as the songs "Hrisoprasino Fillo" and "To Yiasemi".

Vissi appeared on a similar-purposed concert in the city of Larnaka on 27 May, singing among other artists in front of an audience of 30,000 people, singing Dodeka, To Yiasemi, Tillirkotissa and Ta Rialia (Cypriot traditional songs), Den Ine Psema and Antonis Remos' Dio Psemata. During that concert Vissi and Antonis Remos announced their plans to star together next winter in Athens.

In July 2013 Vissi gave three sold-out concerts in Cyprus The successful tour was called "Anna Me Pathos" (Anna With Passion) and she visited Limassol on 27 July, Larnaca on 29 July and Nicosia on 30 July. She also gave a sold-out concert in London's Koko club and appeared in Brussels Bozar for a charity concert

In November Daimones were released as 2CD and 2DVD boxest with TV magazine Tileheatis. The album sold 80.240 in its first week making the magazine the number 1 magazine of the week and achieving 7% raise of its usual sales.

=== 2013–2015: Signing with new record label; performing with Antonis Remos, and a new rock opera ===
In November 2013 it was announced that Vissi signed with record label Panik Records in its new label Panik Gold. The first song, and first single off the forthcoming album "I Kathimerinotita Mas" (Our Daily Routine) was released in mid November 2013 and became the most popular single on the i-tunes daily charts on the first day of its release helping it to make a no2 debut on the weekly Official Greek I-Tune Charts and the official Greece digital songs chart by Billboard. It was reportedly the most played song in Greece on its first week of release. On 20 December, her new show "Ena I Kanena" (One Or Nothing) with Antonis Remos opened at the Pantheon Theatre in Athens.

On 20 January 2014, it was announced that Vissi was voted as the best female artist of the past 15 years from the audience of the no1 music station in Cyprus, Super FM. The same day "Ena I Kanena" was officially released on the radios in Greece and Cyprus.

On 24 January, "Ena I Kanena" was released as digital single and by 28 January, both versions of the song available on i-tunes (radio version and the original longer version) were on the two top positions of the Greek iTunes Chart, and on 6 February, it debuted at number 1 of the official digital singles chart

In Cyprus the song peaked at the top spot of the most popular radio stations

A third single, "Kaliteres Meres" (Better Days), written by Nicos Karvelas and produced by Alex Leon, was released in April 2014 and Panik Records announced in Facebook that the new remixed album would follow shortly.

On 11 April the first application created for a Greek artist, the Fannatics Live App! was released.

In July 2014, the Rector of the University of Bolton, Professor Dr. George Holmes, awarded Honorary Doctorate in Arts to Anna for her contribution to music.

On 29 September, Pantheon Theatre it was announced that the new rock opera by Nikos Karvelas will be premiered in 2015. The title of the new rock opera, the leading role of which would be played by Anna Vissi, was announced as I Kampanes Tou Edelweis (Edelweis Bells).

Vissi toured Australia throughout October. She also performed in Canada to help the restoration of a Greek Orthodox church On 14 October, Panik Records announced that they were planning to release new songs from the OST of I Kampanes Tou Edelweis and their plans to release Ena I Kanena on CD and DVD. They also announced that a new studio album was planned for 2015. On 10 November, a new remix version of her 1997 track "Apolito Keno" was released by Panik Records. "Apolito Keno" (2015 version) featured rapper Mike.

On 14 November the main cast of I Kampanes Tou Edelweis was announced and included Giannis Smasiaris, Nikolaos Karagiaouris, Thanasis Alevras, Emilios Stamatakis and Tania Tripi.

A digital single was released on 30 January for the song "As Min Poume... Tipota" (Let's Say... Nothing) from the rock opera soundtrack.

The rock opera premiered on 12 February 2015, with positive reviews.

=== 2015–2022: Sinentefxi, Hotel Ermou and live album ===
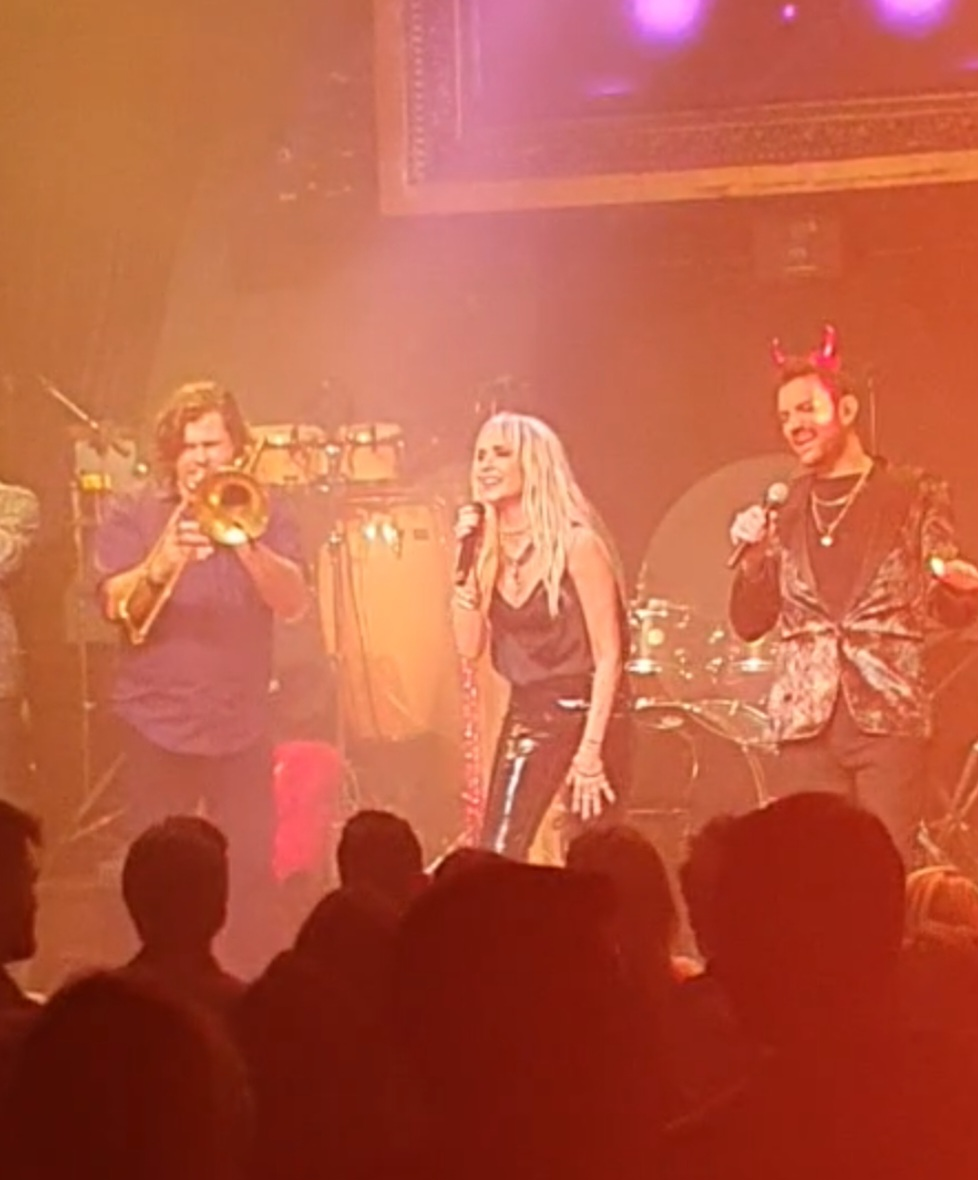
Vissi performing in Hotel Ermou, in Athens, on 5 March 2022.

On 12 October, she released "Gia Sena" (For You) written by Nikos Karvelas as the first single of her upcoming album Sinentefxi (Interview).

Sinentefxi was released on 30 November 2015, featuring 14 new songs. All songs were composed by Nikos Karvelas, while lyrics were provided by Karvelas and Gerasimos Evangelatos (in four songs). The album charted to number 1 of both Cyprus' and Greece's i-tunes charts based only on the pre-orders, and has also entered the top 100 in Malta and Spain.

The weekend before the release of the album, major radio stations in Cyprus and Greece held an "Anna Vissi Weekend" previewing exclusively the new songs. During this weekend, the uptempo track "Xana Mana" was confirmed as the second single off the album. and became the album's biggest hit single.

The album won "Album Of the Year" at the Super Music Awards 2016 in Cyprus. In June 2016, she presented the hit "Xana Mana" as well as the new single and title track "Sinentefxi" on the MAD Video Music Awards 2016, where she received award for her contribution to the Greek music industry.

Since 2015 and for nine consecutive years, Anna Vissi has a successful residency in Hotel Ermou Club in Athens. In 2018 and 2019, she performed the same show with success in Thessaloniki's "Barbarella" night club and toured extensively during all summers in Greece, Cyprus and around the world.

She released her third live album called Hotel Ermou Live 2015–2018.

=== 2022–2024: Aima, Protimo, #Annaversary, Herodion, Kallimarmaro and Se Periptosi Pou ===
In February 2022, Anna Vissi performed at the Panik Concert by Xiaomi, a concert celebrating the 10th anniversary of the record label Panik Records. As the sole artist under the label's "Panik Gold" branch, Vissi concluded the show.

In May 2022, she released the single "Aima" ("Blood"), written by Nikos Karvelas and featuring Daphne Lawrence. The song quickly became a hit, garnering over 3 million views on YouTube within one month. In December 2022, she followed up with the release of the single "Gazoza" ("Lemon soda").

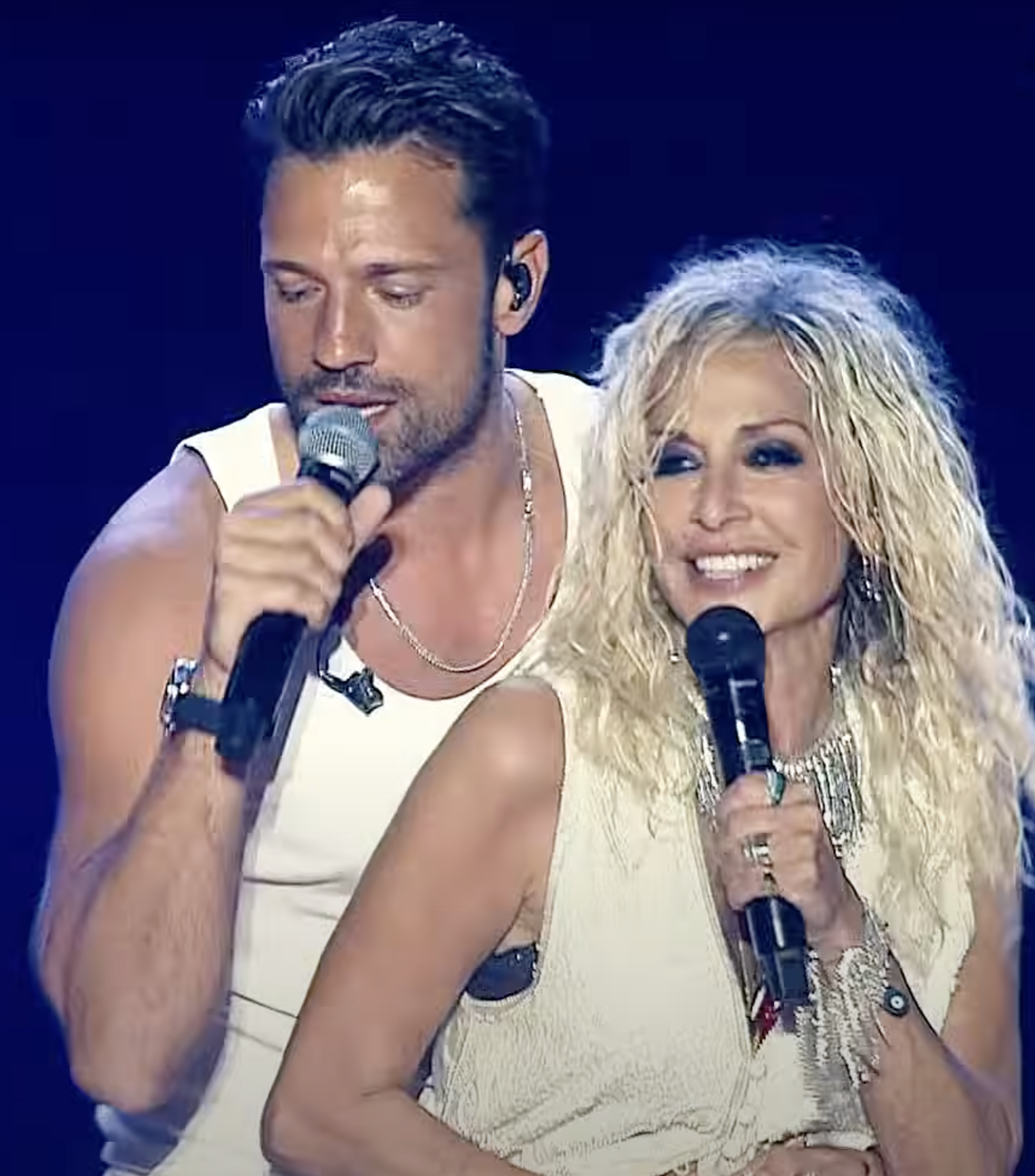
Anna Vissi and Konstantinos Argyros performing in Larnaca on September 30, 2023, during Vissi's 50th career anniversary concert, attended by 50,000 people.

In June 2023, Vissi and Karvelas collaborated on the duet "Ksana" ("Again"), a remake of Sakis Rouvas' 1994 song written by Karvelas. The following month, she released the single "Einai Asteio" ("It is funny"), a remake of Lefteris Pantazis' 1993 song, also written by Karvelas.

2023 marked the 50th anniversary of Anna Vissi's career, often highlighted on social media as #Annaversary. To celebrate, she held two major concerts in Athens and Thessaloniki, as well as a free concert in her hometown of Larnaca, Cyprus, on September 30. The Larnaca concert lasted over four hours and featured guest performances by her sister Lia Vissi and artists including Helena Paparizou, Konstantinos Argyros, Katy Garbi, and Paola. During the event, the mayor of Larnaca, Andreas Vyras, presented Vissi with the "Golden Key" of the city, the highest local honor, which had not been awarded to anyone else in seven years. While the concert was free, attendees were encouraged to donate to the Ronald McDonald House of Nicosia and the Sophia Foundation for Children. It is estimated that the concert was attended by more than 50,000 people. On October 3, her anniversary tour was set to conclude with a performance at the iconic Odeon of Herodes Atticus in Athens. The tickets were sold out in a record time of four hours, leading to the addition of a second show on October 6.

In December 2023, Anna Vissi released the single "Lekes" ("Stain"), written by Nikos Karvelas, which has reached 2× Platinum status. Around the same time, her 10-year-old song "Protimo" ("I Prefer"), also written by Karvelas and originally released in 2013, went viral on TikTok, with over 1,200 new videos featuring the track. The song, which had accumulated 200,000 streams on Spotify between 2013 and 2023, surged to 1 million streams within two months, earning the title of "Number 1 Internet Hit" on Spotify for a period of time. In response to its newfound popularity, Vissi released a remake of the song titled "Protimo '24" ("I Prefer '24") in March 2024. She also embarked on the "Protimo... Anna Vissi" ("I Prefer... Anna Vissi") tour, performing across Greece and Cyprus. The tour concluded on October 5, 2024, with a historic concert at the Kallimarmaro Panathenaic Stadium in Athens, attended by 66,000 people. In May 2024, prior to her tour, Vissi also released the single "Hrisopsara" ("Goldfish"), written by Nikos Karvelas.

From September to November 2024, Anna Vissi performed at the "Barbarella" nightclub in Thessaloniki every Friday and Saturday, before returning to her regular base, "Hotel Ermou", on December 6. Additionally, on November 3, 2024, she performed at the London Palladium, where her audience included Jean Paul Gaultier, the designer of her outfit for her 2006 Eurovision performance. A few days after her successful show in London, she released the single "Se Periptosi Pou" (~"Just in case"), written by Nikos Karvelas. The song reached 2X Platinum status in three months.

On December 4, 2024, she released her fourth live album, "50 Years". The album features the recording of her sold-out performance at the Odeon of Herodes Atticus in October 2023.

=== 2025–present: Kallimarmaro 2.0 (X2) ===
After the massive success of "Se Periptosi Pou," which remained at number 1 on the Greek airplay chart for 11 consecutive weeks, Anna Vissi announced her summer performances in March 2025. Her scheduled concert on September 4, 2025, at AEK Arena in her hometown of Larnaca, Cyprus, sold out within hours after tickets went on sale, prompting the addition of a second show. Vissi also announced another concert at the Kallimarmaro Panathenaic Stadium in Athens, scheduled for September 13, 2025; the same venue had hosted 66,000 attendees during her previous year's performance. Tickets sold out within five days, which journalists reported as a new record time. Due to the high demand, a second show was announced for the following day. In April 2025, Vissi released a new song, "Ola Gia Ola", written by Nikos Karvelas. On Saturday, December 20, the official taping of the show was broadcast by Mega TV, to celebrate the artist's birthday. A few days later, a complementary, 51-track sound recording became available for streaming and purchase on digital platforms.

In early 2026, Vissi left Panik Records and, together with businesswoman Dimitra Kousta, founded Vission Music, a company registered in Greece in February 2026 in which Vissi holds a 10% stake. The label was officially announced on 26 March 2026 as a creative hub overseeing her productions, releases, international collaborations, live performances and audiovisual projects.

"Aigaio", written by Nikos Karvelas and released on 24 April 2026, was the first release on Vission Music, distributed by Panik Entertainment Group. Its music video was directed by Alex De Mora, with creative direction and executive production by Nikos Antoniou and choreography by Jonny Vieco. The song became a trend on TikTok and Instagram, with more than 10,000 user-made videos, and reached the upper positions of the Greek radio airplay chart. It was followed by "OLO PIO PANO" with ARGY in the summer and "Oxi Giati" in September.

After ending her ten-year residency at Hotel Ermou, Vissi announced a concert at the Athens Olympic Stadium (OAKA) on 5 April 2026, with a trailer directed by Machine Operated and creative direction and executive production by Nikos Antoniou. Filmed inside the stadium, the trailer moves from a close-up of Vissi to a full view of the arena through drone footage and stadium screens. The campaign's key art, also under Antoniou's creative direction, featured photography by Madison Phipps and graphic design by Alex Joseph. The show was produced by D&A Live Concerts, co-founded by Vissi and Kousta, with Galaxias Live handling production execution. Ticket presales opened on 16 April through Ticketmaster.

The concert took place on 26 September 2026 in front of more than 95,000 attendees on a 360-degree stage, with ARGY performing the pre-show and guitarist Orianthi appearing as a guest. It also included an AI-assisted segment in which Vissi held a conversation with a younger version of herself.

== Political views ==
In 2004, she spoke passionately against the UN-proposed Annan Plan.

== Personal life ==
Vissi met Nikos Karvelas in the mid 1970s, both of them in the early steps of their singing and songwriting careers. They started dating in the early 1980s and officially married in May 14, 1983. Their daughter, Sofia, was born in November of the same year. Their marriage ended in the early 90s, though their divorce wasn't finalized until the mid-2000s. Their separation was widely publicized by the Greek press and the media, and much of their emotional struggles inspired their released music and artistry. Ever since, they had been sharing a close friendship that lasted until 2026, as well as a commercially and artistically successful collaboration. Karvelas has been often mentioned by the press and the fans as Vissi's mentor and Vissi referenced as Karvelas' muse.

== Discography ==
=== Studio albums ===
- As Kanoume Apopse Mian Arhi (1977)
- Kitrino Galazio (1979)
- Nai (1980)
- Anna Vissi (1981)
- Eimai To Simera Kai Eisai To Chthes (1982)
- Na 'Hes Kardia (1984)
- Kati Simveni (1985)
- I Epomeni Kinisi (1986)
- Tora (1988)
- Empnefsi! (1988)
- Fotia (1989)
- Eimai (1990)
- Emeis (1992)
- Lambo (1992)
- Re! (1994)
- O! Kypros (1995)
- Klima Tropiko (1996)
- Travma (1997)
- Antidoto (1998)
- Everything I Am (2000)
- Kravgi (2000)
- X (2002)
- Paraksenes Eikones (2003)
- Nylon (2005)
- Apagorevmeno (2008)
- Agapi Einai Esi (2010)
- Sinentefxi (2015)
- Iliotropia (2019)

=== Live albums ===
- Live! (1993)
- Live (2004)
- Hotel Ermou Live 2015-2018 (2018)
- 50 Years (Live at Odeon of Herodes Atticus) (2024)
- Panathenaic Stadium Live (2025)

== Filmography, tours and residencies ==
Television
Year	Title	Role	Notes and awards
1980	Eurovision Song Contest	Herself	Greek entrant with the band 'Epikouri'
1982	Eurovision Song Contest	Herself	Cypriot entrant
1995	Me Agapi, Anna (With Love, Anna)	Herself	Hostess; Variety show
1996	Kalinihta Mama (Goodnight Mommy)	Anna Vissi	TV series; 1 episode
2004	Vourate Geitonoi (Run Neighbors)	Anna Vissi	Cypriot serial; 1 episode
2004	Summer Olympics	Herself/Singer	Variety performance in the closing ceremony
2006	Eurovision Song Contest	Herself	Greek entrant
2010	Mila Mou Vromika (Talk Dirty To Me)	Anna Vissi	TV series; 1 episode
2011	Anna Vissi: Oso Exo Foni (Anna Vissi: As Long As I Have Voice)	Herself	First 'Rockumentary' (autobiography) ever to air in Greece / Cyprus
2017	Star Academy	Herself	Judge; Talent show
2020	Menoume spiti me tin Anna Vissi (Stay Home With Anna Vissi)	Herself/Singer	Special show
Theater
Year	Title	Role	Notes and Awards
1991–1992	Daimones (Demons)	Queen/Rozanne	First Greek Rock Opera / Attikon Theatre
1993	Ode to the Gods	Aphrodite	One Act Opera (Cyprus)
2002	Mala – I Mousiki Tou Anemou (Mala – The Music of the Wind)	Mala Zimetbaum	Pallas Theatre
2013	Daimones (Demons)	Queen/Rozane	Pallas Theatre
2015	Oi Kampanes Tou Edelweiss (The Edelweiss Bells)	Anna Orlanto	Pantheon Theatre

== Live shows ==
=== Tours ===
- Tour with Nikos Karvelas (1990)
- 1991 TOUR (1991)
- 20 Years Live Tour (1993)
- Me Agapi Anna Tour (1996)
- Travma World Tour (1997)
- World Tour Europe & USA (1998–1999)
- Kravgi Australian Tour (2003)
- 2004 World Tour (2004)
- Best of Anna Vissi Tour (2006)
- 2007 World Tour (2007)
- Apagorevmeno Summer Tour (2009)
- Australian Tour (2010)
- Pio Konta Tour, Cyprus (2010)
- World Tour USA, Canada & Europe Tour (2011)
- Etsi...Apla Unplugged Live Cyprus Tour (2011)
- Greek & American Summer Tour (2012)
- Anna With Passion Tour (Cyprus) (2013)
- USA & Canada Tour (2014)
- Ena I Kanena The Concert (with Antonis Remos) (Greece-Cyprus) (2014)
- Australian Tour (2014)
- Mazi Sti Skini Tour (Cyprus – with Michalis Hatzigiannis) (2015)
- Summer Tour 2016
- Xana Mana Summer Tour 2018 (Greece-Cyprus-Usa)
- Australian Tour 2019
- Summer Tour 2019 (Bulgaria-Uk-Greece-Cyprus)
- AMIN Summer Tour 2021 (Greece-Cyprus – Monaco)
- Red Summer Tour 2022 (Australia – USA – Canada – Greece – Cyprus)
- 50 year ANNAversary concerts 2023
- Odeon Of Herodes Atticus 2023
- Protimo Tour (2024)
- Cyprus & KALLIMARMARO 2025
- European Tour 2025

=== Residencies ===
- 1973 DILINA
- 1975 THEMELIO
- 1976 THEMELIO
- 1976 DIAGONIOS
- 1977 DIAGONIOS
- 1979 DILINA
- 1980 STORK
- 1981 DIOGENIS
- 1982 ERMIS
- 1984 DIOGENIS PALLAS
- 1984 NERAIDA
- 1985 ZOOM
- 1985 FANTASIA
- 1986 DIOGENIS PALACE
- 1987 ZOOM
- 1988 FANTASIA
- 1988 NERAIDA
- 1989 DIOGENIS PALACE
- 1990 ANNA VISSI SHOW, REX
- 1991 ANNA VISSI SHOW, RADIO CITY (Thessaloniki)
- 1992 LA MIRAGE (Thessaloniki)
- 1993 ZOOM
- 1995 NERAIDA
- 1995 ASTERIA
- 1996 ASTERIA
- 1996 POLITIA (Thessaloniki)
- 1996 CHAOS
- 1997 RIBA'S
- 1997 PILI AKSIOY (Thessaloniki)
- 1997 GAZI
- 1998 ASTERIA
- 1998 PILI AKSIOY (Thessaloniki)
- 2000 ASTERIA
- 2000 FEVER
- 2001 TEATRO (Thessaloniki)
- 2002 FEVER
- 2003 BOOM (Thessaloniki)
- 2003 DIOGENIS STUDIO
- 2005 VOTANIKOS
- 2009 FABULOUS SHOW, ATHINON ARENA
- 2010 FABULOUS SHOW, PILI AKSIOY (Thessaloniki)
- 2010 FACE2FACE, ATHINON ARENA
- 2011 DODEKA, REX
- 2012 DODEKA, ODEON (Thessaloniki)
- 2012 LAV, KENTRO ATHINON
- 2013 ENA I KANENA, PANTHEON THEATRE
- 2017 SUMMER HOTEL ERMOU
- 2015–2026 HOTEL ERMOU 1,2,3,4,5,6,7,8,9,10
- 2018–2025 BARBARELLA (Thessaloniki)

== See also ==
- List of artists who reached number one on the US Dance chart

Preceded by Elpida with Sokrati; Helena Paparizou with My Number One	Greece in the Eurovision Song Contest; 1980; 2006	Succeeded by Yiannis Dimitras with Feggari kalokerino Sarbel with Yassou Maria
Preceded by Island with Monika	Cyprus in the Eurovision Song Contest; 1982	Succeeded by Stavros & Konstantina with I agapi akoma zi
