= Daimones =

Soundtrack album by Anna Vissi
- Released: November 1991
- Label: Sony Music Greece, Columbia
- Producer: Nikos Karvelas

Anna Vissi chronology
To Tzitziki Kai I Parea Tou (1980)	Daimones (1991)	Ode to the Gods (1993)

Daimones is a soundtrack album of the first ever Greek rock opera starring Anna Vissi, released by Sony Music in Greece and Cyprus. It reached platinum status. The storyline and lyrics are written by Stavros Sideras.

== Album information ==
Music and lyrics are by Nikos Karvelas. Lyrics are by Stavros Sideras.

In 2019, the album was selected for inclusion in the Panik Gold box set The Legendary Recordings 1982-2019. The release came after Panik's acquisition rights of Vissi's back catalogue from her previous record company Sony Music Greece. This box set was printed on a limited edition of 500 copies containing CD releases of all of her albums from 1982 to 2019 plus unreleased material.

== Track listing ==
=== Disc 1 ===
(Act 1)

1. "Ahrimam"
2. "Pare Me" (Take me)
3. "Vasanise" (torture)
4. "Kali Mou Gouvernada" (My good governess)
5. "Stahti" (Ash)
6. "Thanatos Sti Mavri Magissa" (Death on the black witch)
7. "Bori" (It can)
8. "Eisai Akoma Paidi" (You're still a child)
9. "Kafte Ti" (Burn Her)
10. "Oso Gia Sena" (As for you)
11. "Trihes, Den Ehei Tipota" (Nonsense, she has nothing)
12. "Kleino Ta Matia" (I close my eyes)
13. "Tha Kanoume Bam" (We will make a boom)
14. "Kapote Thimamai Me Agapouse" (Once I remember he loved me)
15. "Kokkino Kragion" (Red lipstick)
16. "Pos Niotheis" (How do you feel?)
17. "Sinharitiria" (Congratulations)
18. "Rilaks" (Rocking chair)
19. "Fovamai" (I'm afraid)

=== Disc 2 ===
(Act 2)

1. "Tabala"
2. "Vgikan Oi Efimerides" (The newspapers came out)
3. "Sta Sigoura To Ergo Afto Th'anevei Sto Brodgouei" (This project will go up on Broadway for sure)
4. "Ourania Toksa" (Rainbows)
5. "Sta Avata Monopatia" (On the inaccessible pathways)
6. "Efialtis" (Nightmare)
7. "Kodevo Na Trelatho" (I'm almost going crazy)
8. "Daimones" (Demons)
9. "Kirie" (Sir)
10. "To Tragoudi Tis Filias" (The song of friendship)
11. "Koita Ti Tha Patheis" (Look what's gonna happen to you)
12. "Daimones" (Demons)
13. "Kleino Ta Matia" (I close my eyes)

== Credits ==
=== Programming Arrangements ===
- Nikos Karvelas

=== Programming Engineering ===
- Manolis Vlachos

=== Studio ===
- Home Studio (Athens)

=== Director ===
- Roger Williams

=== Costume Designer ===
- Nikos Petropoulos

=== Choreography ===
- Jeffrey Carter

=== Musical Director ===
- Michalis Rozakis
