= Kitrino Galazio =

Studio album by Anna Vissi
- Released: April 1979
- Recorded: 1978–1979
- Genre: Pop, Modern Laika
- Label: EMI Greece/Columbia
- Producer: Kostas Fasolas

Anna Vissi chronology
As Kanoume Apopse Mian Arhi (1977)	Kitrino Galazio (1979)	Nai (1980)

Remastered release

Kitrino Galazio (Greek: Κίτρινο Γαλάζιο, English: Yellow, Blue) is the title of the second studio album by Greek singer Anna Vissi, released in Greece and Cyprus in 1979 by EMI Greece. It was her first album after her departure from Minos, her previous record label. The album reached platinum status, and was one of the best-selling albums of 1979 in Greece.

== Background and release ==
After Vissi left her previous label, she continued to pursue pop music with the release of her second album. Music and lyrics were written by renowned creators such as Takis Bougas, Yiannis Kalamitsis, Daniel Deschênes, Giorgos Kanellopoulos, Spyros Vlassopoulow, Marianna Sakkari and Vissi herself. The album was well received by the public, with first single "Aftos Pou Perimeno" becoming one of the most played songs of the year.

In 1995, Kitrino Galazio was among the albums that Minos EMI selected for re-release on CD; the CD edition of the album was regularly shipped to stores throughout the years. In 1997, the popularity of "Aftos Pou Perimeno" recurred, when maxi single The Remixes: Oso Eho Foni & Aftos Pou Perimeno was released, including two new remixes of the song. The original album was re-released in 2006 in remastered format, including the two aforementioned remixes of "Aftos Pou Perimeno" as a bonus.

In 2007, all tracks of the album were included on EMI's box set of Vissi's recordings titled Back to Time (Complete EMI Years) which, despite being a box set, charted in the top 10 of the Greek albums chart.

== Track listing ==
=== Original version ===
1. "Kitrino Galazio Kai Meneksedi" (Yellow, blue and lilac)
2. "Tote Tha Fygo" (Then I'll leave)
3. "Ti Ta Theleis" (So what do you want?)
4. "Kai Si Milas" (You talk)
5. "Mi Stenoxoriese Kai Exei O Theos" (Don't worry, God has mercy)
6. "Bres Ton Tropo" (Find a way)
7. "Aftos Pou Perimeno" (The one I'm waiting for)
8. "Magapas" (You love me)
9. "Dyskolos Kairos" (Difficult times)
10. "Agapi Mou" (My love)
11. "An Toulachiston" (If at least)
12. "To Etos Tou Paidiou" (The year of the child)

=== Remastered edition ===
1. "Kitrino Galazio Kai Meneksedi"
2. "Tote Tha Fygo"
3. "Ti Ta Theleis"
4. "Kai Si Milas"
5. "Mi Stenoxoriese Kai Exei O Theos"
6. "Bres Ton Tropo"
7. "Aftos Pou Perimeno"
8. "Magapas"
9. "Dyskolos Kairos"
10. "Agapi Mou"
11. "Toulachiston"
12. "To Etos Tou Paidiou"
13. "Aftos Pou Perimeno" (Dream In The House Mix)
14. "Aftos Pou Perimeno" (Anna's Dream Mix)

== Credits and personnel ==
Personnel

- Daniel Deschênes - music
- Dimitris Iatropoulos - lyrics
- Ioannis Kalamitsis - lyrics
- Giorgos Kanellopoulos - lyrics
- Takis Bougas - music
- Anna Vissi - vocals, music
- Marianna Sakari - music, lyrics

Production

- Kostas Fasolas - production management, recording engineering at Studio ERA
- Giorgos Niarchos - arrangements, instrumentation, orchestral conduction
- Charalambos Biris - assistant recording engineer at Studio ERA

Design

- Christos Christodoulidis - photos
- Dimitris Arvanitis - cover design

Credits adapted from the album's liner notes.
