= Na 'Hes Kardia =

Studio album by Anna Vissi
- Released: March 22, 1984
- Recorded: Studio Sierra
- Genre: Modern laika
- Label: CBS Greece
- Producer: Nikos Karvelas

Anna Vissi chronology
Eimai To Simera Kai Eisai To Chthes (1982)	Na 'Hes Kardia (1984)	Kati Simveni (1985)

Singles from Na 'Hes Kardia
- 1. "Zoi Na Ehoume" Released: 1984; 2. "Ime I Anna" Released: 1984

1992 CD release
- Cover of the 1992 Na 'Hes Kardia and Kati Simveni joint package. All tracks of both albums were first released on one single CD for the Greek market.

Na 'hes Kardia (Greek: Να 'Χες Καρδιά; English: If You Had A Heart) is the sixth album by Greek singer Anna Vissi. Released in 1984, it was her first album under CBS Greece. It featured 12 laika songs, all written by then-husband Nikos Karvelas. Lyricists of the album were Karvelas, Vissi herself and Sarantis Alivizatos. The ballad "Kai Eho Tosa Na Thimame" (And I have so much to remember) is considered the most durable hit off the album, still gaining airplay in Greek radio stations and being a standard of most of Vissi's shows. The orchestra was conducted by Nikos Lavranos. In the course of years, the album reached Gold status. It was first released on CD in 1992 as a joint package with 1985's album Kati Simveni. In 1997, a separate, stand-alone edition was released.

In 2019, the album was selected for inclusion in the Panik Gold box set The Legendary Recordings 1982-2019. The release came after Panik's acquisition rights of Vissi's back catalogue from her previous record company Sony Music Greece. This box set was printed on a limited edition of 500 copies containing CD releases of all of her albums from 1982 to 2019 plus unreleased material.

== Track listing ==
1. "Zoi Na Ehoume" (Cheers to our lives)
2. "Ime I Anna" (I am Anna)
3. "Ela" (Come)
4. "Na Tan Mia Nihta I Zoi" (Wish life would last a night time)
5. "Diki Sou" (I'm yours)
6. "Ke Eho Tosa Na Thimame" (I have so much to remember)
7. "Anthropino To Lathos Mou" (My mistake is human)
8. "Mono Yia Senane" (Only for you)
9. "M' Agapouse Pou Les" (So, he used to love me)
10. "Na'Hes Kardia" (If you had a heart)
11. "Mi Me Rotas" (Don't ask me)
12. "Kalitera Na Poume Antio" (It's better to say goodbye)

== Credits and personnel ==
Personnel

- Yiannis Bithikotsis - bouzouki
- Yiannis Ioannou - accordion
- Charalambos Laskarakis - guitars
- Giorgos Lavranos - drums, percussion
- Yiannis Piliouris - backing vocals
- Lia Piliouris - backing vocals
- Yiannis Saroglou - bass
- Philippos Tsemberoulis - flute, clarinet, saxophone
- Lefteris Zervas - violin
- Sarantis Alivizatos - lyrics
- Nikos Karvelas - music, lyrics
- Anna Vissi - vocals, lyrics

Production

- Nikos Karvelas/Sony Music - production management
- Nikos Lavranos - arrangements
- Charalambos Mpiris - recording engineer at Studio SIERRA

Design

- Alinda Mavrogenis - photos
- Studio 31 - cover

Credits adapted from the album's liner notes.

== Music ==
Music and lyrics are by Nikos Karvelas. Also Anna Vissi and Sarantis Alivizatos contributed to some lyrics.
