= Eimai To Simera Kai Eisai To Chthes =

Studio album by Anna Vissi
- Released: December 1982
- Label: CarVi
- Producer: CarVi (Nikos Karvelas & Anna Vissi)

Anna Vissi chronology
Anna Vissi (1981)	Eimai To Simera Kai Eisai To Chthes (1982)	Na 'Hes Kardia (1984)

Eimai To Simera Kai Eisai To Chthes (Greek: Είμαι το σήμερα και είσαι το χθες; English: I am today and you are yesterday) is the name of the limited run and much valued fifth studio album by singer Anna Vissi. The album was released in 1982 by the short-lived record label Vissi and Nikos Karvelas formed for the release known as CarVi, whose name was a combination of their last names.

At the time, Vissi was still signed to the Greek division of the EMI-owned Columbia Records, which went against her contract releasing an album with a different label. The independent production and release was a result of unresolved differences under her then signing. A court order in favor of EMIAL - the Greek division of EMI and the parent company of the Greek division of Columbia Records - resulted in the withdrawal of the album only a few weeks after its release, making the LP a collectible item. It is also the first album to be entirely written, composed and produced by Karvelas made for Vissi and kicks off a long collaboration. The album is considered by fans to be a raw and authentic composition for both Vissi and Karvelas, completely unburdened by any influence or control by a multinational record label.

In 2019, 37 years after its initial release, the album became officially available for the first time, both on CD and music streaming services with the Panik Gold box set The Legendary Recordings 1982-2019. The release came after Panik's acquisition rights of Vissi's back catalogue from her previous record company Sony Music Greece. This box set was released on a limited edition of 500 copies containing all of her albums from 1982 until 2019 plus much unreleased material.

== Track listing ==
All lyrics by Anna Vissi and all music by Nikos Karvelas.

1. "Ime To Simera Kai Ise To Hthes" (I am the present you are the past)
2. "Ego Den Hanome Pote Mou" (I will never be lost)
3. "Ah Den M'agapas" (Oh you don't love me)
4. "Pali" (Again)
5. "As Iksera" (If I knew)
6. "Proti Fora" (First time)
7. "Agapes" (Loves)
8. "Adikos O Horismos Mas" (Our unfair separation)
9. "Oso Ise" (As long as you)
10. "Parto Aeroplano" (Get on the plane)
11. "Tora" (Now)
12. "Argisame Poli" (It took us a long time)

== Credits and personnel ==
Personnel

- Nikos Karvelas - music
- Anna Vissi - vocals, lyrics

Production

- Nikos Karvelas - production management, sound remixing
- Nikos Lavranos - arrangements, instrumentation, orchestral conduction
- Charalambos Mpiris - recording engineering, sound remixing at Studio ERA

Design

- Nikos Karvelas - photos

Credits adapted from the album's liner notes.
