= Nai (album) =

Studio album by Anna Vissi
- Released: December 1980
- Recorded: 1980
- Genre: Pop
- Label: EMI Greece/Columbia
- Producer: Kostas Fasolas

Anna Vissi chronology
Kitrino Galazio (1979)	Nai (1980)	Anna Vissi (1981)

Remastered r′elease
- Cover of the 2006 Remastered CD Release.

Nai (Greek: Ναι; English: Yes) is the third studio album by Greek singer Anna Vissi. It was released in Greece and Cyprus in 1980 by EMI Greece. In 2006, a remastered version was released, including her entry in the ESC (1980's "Autostop", featuring Epikouri), as well as two remixes of the song "Oso Eho Foni". The album reached gold status.

== Background and release ==
After the success coming from her 1979 album Kitrino Galazio, Vissi continued with pop songs here. "Methismeni Politia" was the theme song for a popular drama series during the 1980–1981 TV season on ERT, months before the release of the album and the song subsequently became the first single. The next singles "Oso Eho Foni" and "To Ksero Tha Ertheis Ksana" (a cover of "Woman In Love") were also popular, with "Oso Eho Foni" becoming one of her most enduring classics.

In 1995, Nai was among the albums that Minos EMI selected for re-release on CD; the CD edition of the album was regularly shipped to stores throughout the years. In 1997, the popularity of "Oso Eho Foni" recurred, when maxi single The Remixes: Oso Eho Foni & Aftos Pou Perimeno was released, including two new remixes of the song.

In 2006, prompted by Vissi's entry in Eurovision Song Contest 2006, EMI released a remastered edition of the album adding the 1980 entry in Eurovision Song Contest "Autostop" and the two remixes of "Oso Eho Foni" from the 1997 single.

All songs from the album were included in 2007 Anna Vissi box set Back to Time (Complete EMI Years) which charted on the Greek Albums Chart.

The album includes the soundtrack of the TV series Methismeni Politeia.

== Track listing ==
Original version

1. "Oso Eho Foni" (As long as I have a voice)
2. "To Ksero Tha Erthis Ksana" ("Woman In Love") (I know you'll be back)
3. "Den Eimai Monahi" (I'm not alone)
4. "Kles Esi Ke Pono" ("Je Reviens De Chercher") (You cry and I feel pain)
5. "Magapouses Kapou Kapou" (You loved me every now and then)
6. "Gia Afto Sou Leo Mi" (That's why I tell you no)
7. "Ti Me Rotas" (Why are you asking me?)
8. "Milise Mou" (Talk to me)
9. "Na I Zoi" (There is life)
10. "Ma Den Fovame" (But I'm not afraid)
11. "Kegete O Kosmos Kegete" (World is burning up)
12. "Xanazo" (I live again)
13. "Methismeni Politia" (Drunk state)

2006 remastered version

1. "Oso Eho Foni"
2. "To Ksero Tha Erthis Ksana" ("Woman In Love")
3. "Den Eimai Monahi"
4. "Kles Esi Kai Pono" ("Je Reviens De Chercher")
5. "Magapouses Kapou Kapou"
6. "Gia Afto Sou Leo Mi"
7. "Ti Me Rotas"
8. "Milise Mou"
9. "Na I Zoi"
10. "Ma Den Fovame"
11. "Kegete O Kosmos Kegete"
12. "Ksanazo"
13. "Methismeni Politia"
14. "Autostop" (ESC 1980 Greek entry)
15. "Oso Eho Foni (Club Mix)"
16. "Oso Eho Foni (Revival Mix)"

== Music ==
Music and lyrics are by Filipos Nikolaou, Spiros Vlassopoulos, Yorgos Kannelopoulos, M. Mikelis and D. Iatropoulos.

== Personnel ==
Credits adapted from the album's liner notes.

- Gilbert François Becaud – music
- P. Delanoe – music
- Dimitris Iatropoulos – lyrics
- Barry Gibb – music
- Robin Gibb – music
- Giorgos Kanelopoulos – lyrics
- Αlice Maywood – music
- Manolis Mikelis – music
- Philippos Nikolaou – music, lyrics
- Anna Vissi – vocals
- Spiros Vlassopoulos – music

Production

- Kostas Fasolas – production management, recording engineering at Studio ERA
- Nikos Lavranos – arrangements, instrumentation, orchestral conduction
- Haris Andreadis – arrangements, instrumentation, orchestral conduction

Design

- Christos Christodoulidis – photos
- Dimitris Arvanitis – cover design
