= Klima Tropiko =

Studio album by Anna Vissi
- Released: February 29, 1996
- Recorded: Late 1995–1996
- Studio: Kiriazis Studio
- Genre: Greek music, laika, pop
- Label: Sony Music Greece/Columbia
- Producer: Nikos Karvelas

Anna Vissi chronology
O! Kypros (1995)	Klima Tropiko (1996)	Travma (1997)

limited edition
- Limited edition cover

Singles from Klima Tropiko
- 1. "Trelenome (Klima Tropiko)" Released: February 29, 1996; 2. "Paralio" Released: April 1996; 3. "Ke Ti Egine" Released: June 1996; 4. "Parte Ta Ola" Released: August 1996; 5. "Ekatommiria" Released: October 1996; 6. "Sentonia" Released: December 1996

Klima Tropiko (Greek: Κλίμα Τροπικό; English: Tropical Climate) is the name of a Greek album by singer Anna Vissi released in Greece and Cyprus in February 1996. It reached 2× Platinum, acclaiming both critical and commercial success and establishing Vissi's image as a pop icon and contemporary artist in both Greece and Cyprus. In 2000,Hülya Avşar covered the song in Turkish as "Sevdim" ("I loved").

In 2019, the album was selected for inclusion in the Panik Gold box set The Legendary Recordings 1982-2019. The release came after Panik's acquisition rights of Vissi's back catalogue from her previous record company Sony Music Greece. This box set was printed on a limited edition of 500 copies containing CD releases of all of her albums from 1982 to 2019 plus unreleased material.

In late 2025, Sony Music Greece announced a coloured vinyl limited reissue, as part of the Rainbow Collection, released for pre-order as a collector's item. A meet-and-greet, scheduled for December 12, was then attended by 150 fans, who were able to have their own copies personally signed by the artist.

== Music ==
Music and lyrics are by Nikos Karvelas, Apostolos Diavolikis, and Natalia Germanou.

== Track listing ==
1. "Trelenome (Klima Tropiko)" (I go crazy (Tropical climate))
2. "Ke Ti Egine" (So what?)
3. "Paralio" (I get paralyzed)
4. "Parte Ta Ola" (Take it all)
5. "Oti Mou Zitisis" (Whatever you ask me)
6. "Horevo" (I dance)
7. "S' Agapo M' Agapas" (I love you, you love me)
8. "Ekatommiria" (Millions)
9. "Sentonia" (Sheets)
10. "Agoni Grammi" (Barren line)
11. "Dihasmeno Kormi" (Divided body)
12. "Eleni" (Bonus Track) (Helen)

== Music videos ==
- "Trelenome (Klima Tropiko)" (Director: Vaggelis Kalaitzidis)
- "Paralio" (Director: )
- "Ke Ti Egine" (Director: George Gavalos)
- "Parte Ta Ola" (Director: George Gavalos)
- "Ekatommiria" (Director: )
- "Sentonia" (Director: Vaggelis Kalaitzidis)

== Music Videos ==
"Trelenome", "Ke Ti Egine", "Parte Ta Ola" and "Sentonia" were released on promotional videos during 1996. "Trelenome" and "Sentonia" were directed by Vangelis Kalaitzis, whereas "Ke Ti Egine" and "Parte Ta Ola" were directed by George Gavalos, all gaining extensive airplay in local TV stations.

In 2001, when Vissi's first video compilation The Video Collection was released, none of the videos was included in the tracklist.

== Credits and personnel ==
Personnel

- Agapitos - bouzouki on track “Eleni”
- Apostolos Diavolikis - lyrics
- Natalia Germanou - lyrics
- Nikos Karvelas - music, lyrics, acoustic guitar, keyboards, drums
- Nikos Koliakoudakis - Cretan lyra on track “Agoni Grammi”
- Pantelis Konstantinidis - bouzouki, üti
- Petros Kourtis - percussions, bongos, darambhuka, tambhits, shaker, talking drum, ‘daouli’ drum, reck, bendir, rain
- Panagiotis Kiriazis - drum machine R-808 programming on track “Oti Mou Zitisis”
- Yiannis Lionakis - electric & acoustic guitar, lute, baglamas, tzouras
- Faedon Lionoudakis - accordion
- Andreas Mouzakis - drums
- Sakis Pilatos - bass on track “Eleni”
- Giorgos Tsolakos - keyboards, piano
- Nikos Vardis - bass
- Thanasis Vasilopoulos - clarinet
- Anna Vissi - vocals

Production

- Nikos Karvelas - production management, arrangements, instrumentation, instrument playing
- Giorgos Ragkos - recording engineering, mixing at Kiriazis Studios

Design

- Tasos Vrettos - photos
- Yiannis Angelakis - make up
- Yiannis Michaelidis - hair styling
- Yiannis Doxas - cover design
- Michalis Orfanos - cover printing

Credits adapted from the album's liner notes.

== Charts ==
Chart	Providers	Peak Position	Certification
Greek Albums Chart	IFPI	1	2× Platinum
Cypriot Albums Chart	All Records Top 20	1	3× Platinum
