= Tiraniemai =

Tiranniemai Τυραννιέμαι

EP by Anna Vissi
- Released: 20 July 2012
- Recorded: 2011–2012
- Genres: Rock, contemporary laïko, pop rock, dance-pop
- Labels: Sony Music Greece/Columbia, Vanilia Ltd.
- Producers: Nikos Karvelas, Anna Vissi

Singles from Tiranniemai
- 1. ""Ora Na Fevgo"" Released: 2012; 2. ""Mia Nichta To Poly"" Released: 2012; 3. ""Tiranieme"" Released: 27 May 2012; 4. ""Venzini"" Released: 12 July 2012

Tiranniemai (Greek: Τυραννιέμαι; English: I'm suffering) is an EP, which was released on 20 July 2012 by Sony Music Greece and Vanilla Ltd as a covermount with Tiletheatis, a weekly magazine. It's a CD+DVD set. The CD included 4 new songs and 2 remixes and the DVD 2 video clips.

== Release and promotion ==
The album was released on 20 July 2012 as a covermount with Τiletheatis.

== Track listing ==
=== CD ===
No.	Title	Writer(s)	Producer(s)	Length
1.	"Tiranniemai" (Τυραννιέμαι; I'm suffering)	Nikos Karvelas	Karvelas, Vissi	4:01
2.	"Mia nychta to poli" (Μια νύχτα το πολύ; Μore than a night)	Karvelas	Karvelas, Vissi	4:40
3.	"Ora na fevgo" (Ώρα να φεύγω; It's time to go)	Karvelas	Karvelas, Vissi	3:54
4.	"Venzini" (Βενζίνη; Petrol/Gasoline)	Karvelas	Karvelas, Vissi	3:59
5.	"Tiranniemai (Alex Leon Panik Club remix)"	Karvelas	Alex Leon	5:44
6.	"Venzini (Alex Leon Dubstep remix)"	Karvelas	Alex Leon	3:59

=== DVD ===
No.	Title	Writer(s)	Director	Length
1.	"Tiranniemai" (Τυραννιέμαι; I'm suffering)	Nikos Karvelas	Mirto Kontova
2.	"Ora Na Fevgo" (Ώρα να φεύγω; It's time to go)	Karvelas	Mirto Kontova

== Access All Areas ==
Tracks 1 - 4 were included on the greatest hits album Access All Areas which was released in December 2012, to celebrate 40 years of Vissi's career.

== Personnel ==
- Nikos Karvelas – producer, orchestration, music, lyrics, backing vocals
- Anna Vissi- producer, orchestration, vocals
- Christos Alexakis - programming, orchestration, keyboards
- Giannis Kifonidis - programming, keyboards, sound, mix
- Stelios Fragkos - guitars
- Tasos Faitos - bass
- Serafim Yannakopoulos - drums
- Christos Bousdoukos - harmonica
