= Vourate Geitonoi =

Vourate Geitonoi (Cypriot Greek: Βουράτε Γειτόνοι; meaning: Run Neighbors) is a Cypriot comedy series broadcast by Sigma TV from 2001 to 2005. Due to its massive popularity, the series aired for one more season in 2010 part of Sigma TV 15 year celebrations.

In 2019, a spin-off movie based on the series was released, titled Vourate Geitonoi.

== Plot ==
The series revolves around the lives of the residents of a Nicosia apartment building.

== Characters ==
The owner of the building, Rikkos Mapouros is known for his stinginess. This is shown on many occasions. For example, in the last season of the series Rikkos son requested a mobile phone for his birthday. Rikkos, reluctant to spend unnecessary money he attaches two cups together with a wire and gives them to his son. He suffered a stroke when he was asked to pay taxes, something he had been somehow avoiding for years.

Pepa, Rikkos' wife, is known to have the most common sense of all the characters. She often gets in fights with Rikkos and chases him with a wooden rolling pin.

Kikitsa, Rikkos' and Pepa's oldest child, is known for being spoilt although Rikkos never buys her anything. By the end of the series she is married.

Nastazia, Rikkos' and Pepa's neighbor, who runs a beauty salon on the floor above them, is known for her dislike of the Greek Cypriot dialect and recoils whenever Rikkos is hitting on her due to the fact that Rikkos is very traditional. She also gets married by the end of the series.

Artemakis, Nastazia's neighbor, is studying to become a cook and is known for frequently exclaiming "Εγώ έντζιε", a way of saying you are innocent in the Greek Cypriot dialect.

Yiannis, Artemakis' roommate, is studying to become a police officer. He is often seen arguing and fighting with Artemakis.

Antonakis Kattos is a policeman who is introduced to the series by interrogating Rikkos about a case of attempted murder. His son, Sofronis, is Kikitsa's boyfriend and eventual husband.

There are several other less significant characters.

== Main cast ==
Actor	Character
Giorgos Zenios	Rikkos Mappouros
Alkistis Pavlidou	Pepa Kolokasi-Mappourou
Mara Konstantinou	Kikitsa Mappourou
Christina Pavlidou	Nastazia
Sofoklis Kaskaounias	Artemakis Artemiou
Christoforos Christoforou	Giannis Ioannou
Elena Christofi	Sotia Tzirkalli
Giorgos Tsiakkas	Sokratis
Simos Tsiakkas	Sofronis Kattos
Dimitris Xistras	Antonakis Kattos
