= I Epomeni Kinisi =

Studio album by Anna Vissi
- Released: December 15, 1986
- Genre: Pop, Modern Laika
- Length: 37 min
- Label: CBS Greece

Anna Vissi chronology
Kati Simveni (1985)	I Epomeni Kinisi (1986)	Tora (1988)

Singles from I Epomeni Kinisi
- 1. "I Epomeni Kinisi" Released: 1986; 2. "Se Posa Tablo" Released: 1986; 3. "Otan Kanoume Erota" Released: 1987; 4. "Pragmata" Released: 1987

I Epomeni Kinisi (Greek: Η Επόμενη Κίνηση; English: The Next Move) is a Greek album by singer Anna Vissi released in Greece and Cyprus in 1986 by CBS Greece. This album is all written by Nikos Karvelas. In spite of her previous albums, it featured a clear pop sound, very distinctive of Vissi's next albums. The album reached platinum status and was one of the best-selling albums of 1987 in Greece.

== Album information ==
As the two number-one singles off the album Kati Simveni were written by Nikos Karvelas, the suggestion for the next album to be written and produced entirely by Karvelas was unanimously accepted by Vissi's label executives. The result was a pop album of 10 songs, a departure from laiko and Greek folk tunes Kati Simveni was influenced from. The result was commercially and critically acclaimed, with sales reaching Platinum status, selling more than 100,000 copies and becoming one of the most commercial Greek albums of 1987.

It is one of the first album titles CBS Greece released on CD in late 1987, including five tracks from "Kati Simveni" as a bonus. In 1992, all tracks from the original album along with Vissi's next album "Tora" were released as a joint package, as their initial CD releases had been out of print at the time.

In 1996, the album was released digitally in a stand-alone edition, only the LP's initial 10 tracks included, as a part of the OK! Budget Price series Sony Music Greece launched at the time.

In 2019, the album was selected for inclusion in the Panik Gold box set The Legendary Recordings 1982–2019. The release came after Panik's acquisition rights of Vissi's back catalogue from her previous record company Sony Music Greece. This box set was printed on a limited edition of 500 copies containing CD releases of all of her albums from 1982 to 2019 plus unreleased material.

== Music ==
Music and lyrics on the album are by Nikos Karvelas. Anna Vissi and Giorgos Mitsigas contributed as the lyricists of two songs.

=== LP and 1996's CD edition track listing ===
1. "I Epomeni Kinisi" (The next move)
2. "Se Posa Tablo" (On how many fields)
3. "Otan Kanoume Erota" (When we make love)
4. "Skepasto" (Cover it [Put the roof up on your convertible])
5. "Agapi Kai Misos" (Love and hate)
6. "Pragmata" (Things)
7. "Apodiksis" (Evidence)
8. "S' Agapo Telia Kai Pavla" (I love you, period)
9. "Me Agapi Apo Mena Gia Sena" (With love from me to you)
10. "Dromos" (Road)
- All Tracks Arranged by Nikos Karvelas
- Music written by Nikos Karvelas
- Lyrics: tracks 1–5, 7, 9–10, 12 Nikos Karvelas; track 6 Nikos Karvelas, Anna Vissi, Giorgos Mitsigkas; track 8 Giorgos Mitsigkas.

=== 1986's CD edition track listing ===
When the album was released in a CD in 1986 it featured five tracks as bonus tracks from the album "Kati Simveni"

The track list was as follows:

1. "I Epomeni Kinisi"
2. "Se Posa Tablo"
3. "Otan Kanoume Erota"
4. "Skepasto"
5. "Agapi Kai Misos
6. "Pragmata
7. "Apodeikseis
8. "S' Agapo Telia Kai Pavla"
9. "Me Agapi Apo Mena Gia Sena"
10. "Dromos"
11. "Dodeka"*
12. "San Ke Mena Kamia"*
13. "Kati Simveni"*
14. "Ti Eho Na Haso"*
15. "Ki Omos Ehis Figi"*
- Tracks 11–15 (p) 1985 CBS originally on the album "Kati Simveni".
- Tracks 1–11 arranged by Nikos Karvelas; tracks 12–15 arranged by Antonis Vardis.

==== Music ====
- Tracks 1–12, 14 Nikos Karvelas
- Tracks 13, 15 Antonis Vardis

==== Lyrics ====
- Tracks 1–5, 7, 9–10, 12 Nikos Karvelas
- Track 6 Nikos Karvelas, Anna Vissi, Giorgos Mitsigas
- Track 8 Giorgos Mitsigas
- Track 11 Philippos Nikolaou, Nikos Karvelas
- Track 13 Sarantis Alivizatos
- Track 15 Antonis Vardis

== Credits and personnel on tracks 1–10 ==
Personnel

- Stefanos Korkolis – piano
- Dimitris Papadimitriou – synthesizers
- Nikos Antypas – drums
- Nikos Vardis – bass
- Savvas – guitar
- David Lynch – saxophone
- Yiannis Piliouris – backing vocals
- Lia Piliouris – backing vocals
- Katerina Adamantidou – backing vocals
- Kostas Charitodiplomenos – synthesizers, solo guitar, backing vocals
- Nikos Karvelas – music, lyrics, piano, synthesizers, guitars, percussions, backing vocals
- Giorgos Mitsigkas – lyrics
- Anna Vissi – vocals, lyrics

Production

- Nikos Karvelas/Sony Music – production management
- Nikos Karvelas – arrangements, instrumentations
- Akis Golfidis – recording engineering, mixing at Studio Sierra
- Manolis Olandezos – assistant recording engineer at Studio Sierra

Design

- Giorgos Lizardos – photos
- Studio 31 – cover

Credits adapted from the album's liner notes.
