= As Kanoume Apopse Mian Arhi =

Studio album by Anna Vissi
- Released: October 1977
- Recorded: 1975–1977
- Genre: Modern Laika
- Label: Minos
- Producer: Achilleas Theofilou

Anna Vissi chronology
As Kanoume Apopse Mian Arhi (1977)	Kitrino Galazio (1979)

Remastered Release
- Cover of the 2006 Remastered CD Release.

As Kanoume Apopse Mian Arhi (Greek: Ας κάνουμε απόψε μιαν αρχή; English: Let's Make A Start Tonight) is the title of the debut studio album by Greek singer Anna Vissi, released in Greece and Cyprus by Minos in 1977.

== Album information ==
In the 1970s in the Greek music industry, the prerequisite to recording a personal album was to prove one's artistic merits by collaborating and recording with other established musicians. Having proved herself by collaborating with composers like Mikis Theodorakis and several influential artists like George Dalaras, record company Minos finally granted Vissi the privilege of recording her debut personal studio album. The album featured 11 new songs and 2 songs previously included in various composer albums.

The lead single, "As Kanoume Apopse Mian Arhi" was performed by Vissi at the Thessaloniki Song Festival, on September 26, 1977, prior to the album release, winning the first prize and, thus, gaining nationwide popularity as a solo artist.

In 1993, "As Kanoume Apopse Mian Arhi" was among the selection of albums that Minos-EMI decided to release on CD as it was still popular. The Minos EMI reissue for the back catalogue Minos EMI CD Club series, which was regularly shipped in shops throughout the years, is shown here.

In 2006 it was re-released in a remasted edition including a bonus CD with additional songs from her early career with Minos featured on albums of other successful artists. In 2007 the songs of the album were included on EMI's boxset of Vissi recordings Back to Time (Complete EMI Years) which, despite being a box set, charted in the Top 10 of sales charts.

=== Music ===
Music and lyrics are by Doros Georgiadis, Spiros Blassopoulos, Antonis Vardis, Panos Falaras, Giannis Spanos, Manos Eleftheriou, M. Terzis, G. Karakatsanis, G. Gerasimidis, and K. Loizos.

== Track listing ==
=== Original version ===
1. "As Kanoume Apopse Mian Arhi" (Let's make a start tonight)
2. "Agapise Me" (Love me)
3. "Oi Kiklades" (The Cyclades)
4. "Kladi Rodias" (Branch of pomegranate)
5. "Sou Dosa Na Peis" (I gave you to drink)
6. "Mi Bazeis Mavro" (Don't put black)
7. "Namouna Sta Cheria Sou" (I was in the hands of your boat)
8. "Oi Nikimeni Eimaste Emeis" (We are the losers)
9. "Apo Edo Kai Apo Kei" (From here and from there)
10. "Geia Sas Triantafylla" (Hello roses)
11. "I Agapi Sou Sholeio" (Your school love)
12. "To Tali Tampo"
13. "Ilie Mou" (My sun)

=== 2006 remastered edition ===
Disc 1: The original album

1. "As Kanoume Apopse Mian Arhi"
2. "Agapise Me"
3. "Oi Kiklades"
4. "Kladi Rodias"
5. "Sou Dosa Na Peis"
6. "Mi Bazeis Mavro"
7. "Namouna Sta Cheria Sou"
8. "Oi Nikimeni Eimaste Emeis"
9. "Apo Edo Kai Apo Kei"
10. "Geia Sas Triantafylla"
11. "I Agapi Sou Sholeio"
12. "To Tali Tampo"
13. "Ilie Mou"

Disc 2: Recordings 1974-1978

1. "S' Agapo" (I love you)
2. "Dipsasa Stin Porta Sou" (I'm thirsty at your door)
3. "Paramithi Ksehasmeno" (Forgotten fairytale)
4. "Gia Tin Agapi Pes Mou" (Tell me about love)
5. "To Palikari" (The stalwart)
6. "To Palio To Aeroplano" (The old plane)
7. "Savvatiatika" (On a Saturday)
8. "Nikisame" feat Doros Georgiades (We won)
9. "Krivame Tin Agapi Mas" (We hide our love)
10. "Giati Gelas" (Why are you laughing?)
11. "Oute Ena S'Agapo" (Not even one "I love you")
12. "San Ta Pinasmena Peristeria" (Like hungry pigeons)
13. "Mia Mikri Psihoula" (A little soul)
14. "Thelo" (I want)
15. "Oh! Maria" (Oh! Maria)
16. "Kos Nobel" (Mr. Nobel)

== Singles ==
- "As Kanoume Apopse Mian Arhi" (#1 for 1 week)
- "Mi Vazis Mavro" (#4)
- "Na Mouna Sta Heria Sou Karavi" (#6)
- "Sou Dosa Na Pieis" (#10)

== Credits and personnel ==
Personnel

Original LP & CD release
2006 Remastered edition CD 1

- Andreas Aggelakis - lyrics
- Manos Eleftheriou - lyrics
- Panos Falaras - lyrics
- Doros Georgiadis - music, lyrics
- G. Gerasimidis - music, lyrics
- Dimitris Iatropoulos - lyrics
- Tasos Karakatsanis - music
- K. Loïzos - music
- Kostis Palamas - lyrics
- Polydoros - lyrics
- Yiannis Spanos - music
- Sotia Tsotou - lyrics
- Antonis Vardis - music, guitars
- Anna Vissi - vocals
- Spiros Vlassopoulos - music

2006 Remastered edition CD 2

- Akos Daskalopoulos (alias: M. Korfiatis) - lyrics
- Manos Eleftheriou - lyrics
- Manos Eleftheriou - lyrics
- Doros Georgiadis - music, lyrics, vocals
- Christos Gkartzos - music
- Giorgos Hadjinasios - music
- Nikos Karvelas - music
- Stavros Kougioumtzis - music, lyrics
- Spiros Papavasiliou- music
- Lakis Teäzis - lyrics
- Barbara Tsimboulis - lyrics
- Sotia Tsotou - lyrics
- Anna Vissi - vocals

Production

- Achilleas Theofilou - production management
- Giorgos Lefentarios - production assistance
- Peter McNamee - recording engineering at Studio Polysound
- Doros Georgiadis- arrangements, instrumentation, orchestral conduction on tracks 1,6, 12
- Tasos Karakatsanis - arrangements, instrumentation, orchestral conduction on tracks 2, 3, 4, 7, 8, 9, 10, 13
- Yiannis Spanos - arrangements, instrumentation, orchestral conduction 5, 11

Design

- Jacques Iakovides - photos
- Th. & M. Voulgaridi-Hatzistyli - cover design

Credits adapted from the album's liner notes.
