= Anna Vissi (1981 album) =

Studio album by Anna Vissi
- Released: December 1981
- Recorded: 1981
- Genre: Pop
- Label: EMI Greece/Columbia
- Producer: Kostas Fasolas

Anna Vissi chronology
Nai (1980)	Anna Vissi (1981)	Eimai To Simera Kai Eisai To Chthes (1982)

Remastered Release
- Cover of the 2006 Remastered CD Release.

Anna Vissi is the name of a self-titled album by Greek singer Anna Vissi. It is the first album with lifelong collaborator and companion Nikos Karvelas, who is credited under the alias "Nikos Leonardos". It was released in Greece and Cyprus in 1981 by EMI Greece. The album includes both original songs as well as several Greek covers of international hits. The album reached gold status.

== Release ==
The album was repackaged with the same cover in 1982 to include the bonus song "Mono i agapi", which was the Cypriot entry for the 1982 Eurovision Song Contest sung by Vissi.

The album appeared digitally in its entirety for the first time in 2006 with the Minos EMI remastered edition named 4, since it was her fourth album under the label. The re-release was prompted by Vissi's participation in Eurovision, this time for her entry in the 2006 Eurovision Song Contest. Previously, numerous tracks of the album were available in CD format only via various compilations by Minos EMI. The 1982 Eurovision entry "Mono i agapi" was also made available on CD in the CD single "Autostop/Mono I Agapi" released in February 2006.

All songs from the album were included in 2007 Anna Vissi box set Back to Time (Complete EMI Years) which charted on the Greek Albums Chart.

== Track listing ==
- Lyrics by Anna Vissi, Nikos Leonardos (under the pseudonym "Nikos Karvelas") and Giannis Parios. Music by Anna Vissi, Nikos Leonardos and Afoi Tzavara. Track 5 is a cover of La Bohème.

=== Original edition ===
1. "Ine Kati Stigmes" (There are moments)
2. "Poso S'Agapo" (How much I love you)
3. "Horis Esena Ego Den Kano" (I don't do without you)
4. "Thelo Mono Esena" (I only want you)
5. "Ksehase Me" (Forget me)
6. "Ma Itan Psemmata" (It was a lie)
7. "Tha Mporousa" (I could)
8. "Ela Na Zisoume" (Lets live)
9. "Hanome" (I get lost)
10. "Ta Matia Ta Dika Mou" (My eyes)
11. "Se Lipame" (I feel sorry for you)
12. "Kalimera Kenourgia Agapi" (Good morning my new love)

=== 1982 Re-release ===
1. "Mono I Agapi" (ESC 1982 Cypriot entry) (Only love)
2. "Ine Kati Stigmes"
3. "Poso Sagapo"
4. "Horis Esena Ego Den Kano"
5. "Thelo Mono Esena"
6. "Ma Itan Psemmata"
7. "Tha Mporousa"
8. "Ela Na Zisoume"
9. "Hanome"
10. "Ta Matia Ta Dika Mou"
11. "Se Lipame"
12. "Kalimera Kenourgia Agapi"

=== 2006 remastered edition: "4" ===
1. "Ine Kati Stigmes"
2. "Poso Sagapo"
3. "Horis Esena Ego Den Kano"
4. "Thelo Mono Esena"
5. "Ksehase Me"
6. "Ma Itan Psemmata"
7. "Tha Mporousa"
8. "Ela Na Zisoume"
9. "Hanome"
10. "Ta Matia Ta Dika Mou"
11. "Se Lipame"
12. "Kalimera Kenourgia Agapi"
13. "Mono I Agapi" (ESC 1982 Cypriot entry)

== Credits and personnel ==
Personnel

- Charles Aznavour - music
- Sergio Bardotti - music
- Nikos Karvelas (alias: Nikos Leonardos) - music, lyrics
- Yiannis Parios - lyrics
- Jacques Plante - music
- Norman David Shapiro - music
- Giorgos Tzavaras - music
- Nikos Tzavaras - music
- Anna Vissi - vocals, lyrics

Production

- Kostas Fasolas - production management, recording engineering at Studio ERA
- Kostas Klavas - arrangements, instrumentation, orchestral conduction

Design

- Alinda Mavrogenis - photos

Credits adapted from the album's liner notes.

== Release history ==
Region	Year	Label	Format	Version
Greece and Cyprus	1981	EMI Greece/Columbia	LP, cassette	Original release
Greece and Cyprus	1982	EMI Greece/Columbia	LP, cassette	Re-release
Greece and Cyprus	2006	EMI Music Greece	CD	Remastered
