= Live! (Anna Vissi album) =

Live

Live album by Anna Vissi
- Released: December 17, 1993
- Recorded: October–November 1993
- Venue: Zoom Night Club, Athens, Greece
- Studio: Sierra
- Genre: Greek, laika, pop, ballads
- Label: Sony Music, Columbia
- Producer: Yiannis Doulamis

Anna Vissi chronology
| Lambo (1992) | Live (1993) | Re! (1994) |

Anna Vissi Live! is the name of a live Greek album by singer Anna Vissi. It is her first live album and was released in Greece and Cyprus in December 1993. It was recorded in Zoom night club, in Plaka, Athens, a place where Vissi began her first shows in Greece during the 70s. The release was scheduled to celebrate the first two decades of Vissi's singing career (1973–1993). The tracklist included live covers of many of her hits so far, as well as covers of her early recordings back in the 70s, as to honour Stavros Kougioumtzis and Doros Georgiadis, the first composers she collaborated with. It also featured three duets with fellow singers Lampis Livieratos and Yannis Siamsiaris, who also served as backing vocalists. Anna Vissi dedicated the album to her daughter Sofia Karvela.

In 2019, the album was selected for inclusion in the Panik Gold box set The Legendary Recordings 1982-2019. The release came after Panik's acquisition rights of Vissi's back catalogue from her previous record company Sony Music Greece. This box set was printed on a limited edition of 500 copies containing CD releases of all of her albums from 1982 to 2019 plus unreleased material.

== Track listing ==
=== Disc 1 ===
1. "Den Thelo Na Kseris" (I don't want you to know)
2. "S'Agapo" (I love you)
3. "Se Hriazome" (I need you)
4. "Akoma Mia" (One more)
5. "Ime" (I am)
6. "Fos" (Light)
7. "Fotia" (Fire)
8. "Pragmata" (Things)
9. "Empnefsi" (Inspiration)
10. "Lambo" (I shine)
11. "O Telefteos Horos" (The last dance)
12. "Antistrofi Metrisi" (Countdown)
13. "Emis" (We)
14. "Kapou Nihtoni" (Somewhere it gets dark)
15. "S' Agapo" (I love you)
16. "Sta Hronia Tis Ipomonis" (In the years of patience)
17. "Krivame Tin Agapi Mas" (We hide our love)
18. "As Kanoume Apopse Mian Arhi" (Let's make a start tonight)

=== Disc 2 ===
1. "Dodeka" (Twelve o'clock)
2. "Ta Mathitika Ta Hronia" (Student years)
3. "San Kai Emena Kamia" (None like me)
4. "Den S 'Allazo" (I don't change you)
5. "Me Agapi Apo Mena Gia Sena" (With love from me to you)
6. "Pseftika" (Fake)
7. "Oti Thes Ego" (Whatever you want me)
8. "Pikre Mou" (My bitterness)
9. "Demones" (Demons)
10. "I Hantres" (The beads)
11. "Tou Agoriou Apenanti" (The boy across the street)
12. "Krima To Mpoi Sou" (Shame your height)
13. "Efta Tragoudia Tha Sou Po" (Seven songs will tell you)
14. "Stalia Stalia" (Drop by drop)
15. "Dilina" (Sunsets)
16. "Oniro Demeno" (Tied dream)
17. "Kathe Limani Kai Kaimos" (Every port and sorrow)
18. "S' Agapo Giati Ise Orea" (I love you because you're nice)
19. "Ena Sou Leo Ena" (I tell you one thing)
20. "Den Thelo Na Kseris" (Finale) (I don't want you to know (Finale))

== Credits and personnel ==
Personnel

- Yiannis Bithikotsis - bouzouki
- Akos Daskalopoulos (alias: M. Korfiatis) - lyrics
- Manos Eleftheriou - lyrics
- Doros Georgiadis - music, lyrics
- Vangelis Gkoufas - lyrics
- Giorgos Hadjinasios - music
- Kostas Karagiannis - saxophone, keyboards
- Nikos Karvelas - music, lyrics
- Giorgos Katsaros - music
- Tony Kontaxakis - guitars, keyboards
- Stavros Kougioumtzis - music, lyrics
- Giorgos Mitsigkas - lyrics
- Aristides Moschos - music, lyrics
- Nikos Neratzopoulos - keyboards
- Philippos Nikolaou - lyrics
- Alekos Paraskevopoulos - bass
- Elias Paraskevopoulos - drums
- Mimis Plessas-music
- Kostas Pretenteris - lyrics
- Pythagoras - lyrics
- Stavros Sideras - lyrics
- Philippos Stamatopoulos - percussions
- Sevi Tiliakou - lyrics
- Barbara Tsimboulis - lyrics
- Dionisis Tzefronis - lyrics
- Charalambos Vasiliadis - lyrics
- Anna Vissi - vocals
- Stavros Xarhakos - music
- Giorgos Zampetas - music

Production

- Yiannis Doulamis/Sony Music - production management, featured sound editing & remixing
- Kostas Kalimeris - recording engineering at Studio Sierra mobile recording unit, sound editing & remixing at Studio Sierra
- Yiannis Ioannidis - digital mastering

Design

- Takis Diamantopoulos - photos
- Yiannis Doxas - cover design
- Michalis Orfanos - cover printing

Credits adapted from the album's liner notes.
