= Lambo (album) =

Studio album by Anna Vissi
- Released: December 24, 1992
- Recorded: 1992
- Genre: Mambo, pop, laika
- Label: Sony Music Greece/Columbia
- Producer: Nikos Karvelas

Anna Vissi chronology
Emeis (1992)	Lambo (1992)	Live! (1993)

Singles from Lambo
- 1. "Lambo" Released: December 1992; 2. "Akoma Mia" Released: February 1993; 3. "Se Hriazome" Released: April 1993; 4. "O,ti Thes Ego" Released: June 1993

Lambo (Greek: Λάμπω; English: I Shine) is an album by Greek singer Anna Vissi, released in Greece and Cyprus in 1992. The single "Lambo" prompted the mambo dance trend in Greece. Due to its December 24 release date, the album was played extensively during the 1992 Christmas holiday period.

== Album Information ==
Music, lyrics and album production are entirely by Nikos Karvelas.

Lambo, Akoma Mia, Se Hriazome and O,ti thes ego were released on promotional videos during 1992 and 1993, airing in local TV stations. In 2001, the former two were selected for digital release on Vissi's The Video Collection.

In 2019, the album was selected for inclusion in the Panik Gold box set The Legendary Recordings 1982-2019. The release came after Panik's acquisition rights of Vissi's back catalogue from her previous record company Sony Music Greece. This box set was printed on a limited edition of 500 copies containing CD releases of all of her albums from 1982 to 2019 plus unreleased material.

In late 2025, Sony Music Greece announced a coloured vinyl limited reissue, as part of the Rainbow Collection, released for pre-order as a collector's item. A meet-and-greet, scheduled for December 12, was then attended by 150 fans, who were able to have their own copies personally signed by the artist.

== Track listing ==
1. "Lambo" (I'm radiant)
2. "Akoma Mia" (Once more)
3. "O,ti Thes Ego" (Whatever you want, it's me)
4. "Ise Oti Pio Agapimeno Eho" (You are what I love most)
5. "Pikre Mou" (My bitterness)
6. "Se Hriazome" (I need you)
7. "Mi" (Don't)
8. "Ksanagirna" (Come back)
9. "Opou Kai Na Pas" (Wherever you go)
10. "Ftene" (It's their fault)
11. "Den Thelo Na Kseris" (CD hidden track) (I don't want you to know)

== Singles ==
- "Lambo"
- "Akoma Mia"
- "Se Hriazome"
- "O,ti Thes Ego"

== Credits and personnel ==
Personnel

- Nikos Karvelas - music, lyrics
- Tony Kontaxakis - electric guitar
- Philippos Tsemberoulis - saxophone, clarinet
- Anna Vissi - vocals
- vocals on track 1 by Nikos Karvelas, Tony Kontaxakis, Manolis Vlachos, Dimitris Yiarmenitis, Spyros Sofronis and Yiannis Doxas

Production

- Nikos Karvelas - production management, arrangements, instrumentation, instrument playing
- Manolis Vlachos - computer programming, recording engineering, sound remixing at Home Studio

Design

- Panagiotis Hadjistefanou - styling
- Nikos Mbitzanis - make up
- Venia Giannopoulou - hair styling
- Takis Diamantopoulos - photos
- Anna Vissi - hand lettering
- Yiannis Doxas - cover design
- Michalis Orfanos - cover printing

Credits adapted from the album's liner notes.
