= Anna Vissi videography =

Anna Vissi's DVD and music video releases, listed chronologically

Anna Vissi Videography discography
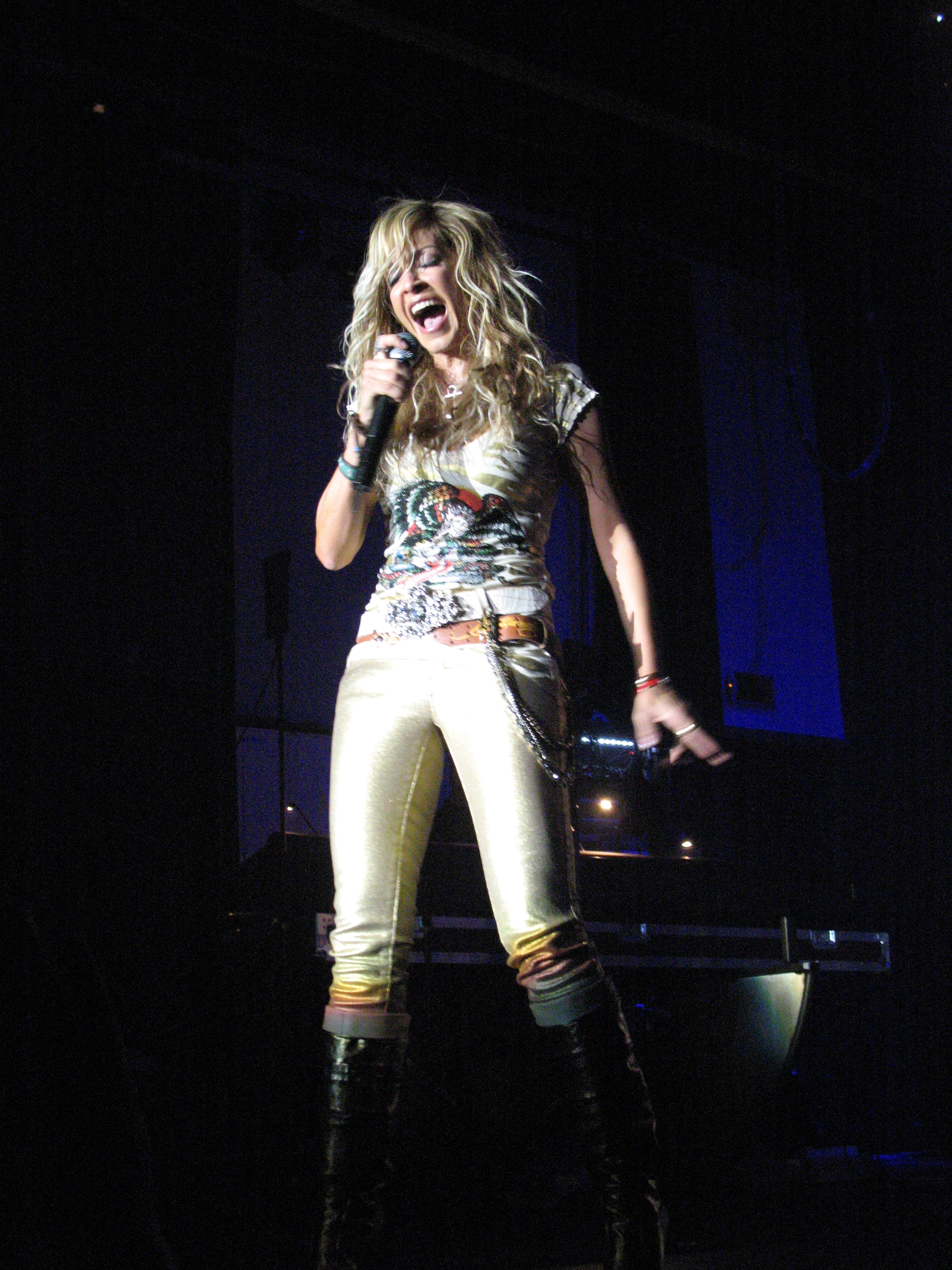
- Anna Vissi performing in 2007.
- Video albums: 5
- Music videos: 98

This page features the full videography of singer Anna Vissi.

== DVDs ==
| Year | Title | Certification |
|---|---|---|
| 2001 | The Video Collection | Gold |
| 2005 | Live | Gold |
| 2005 | Nylon - The Dual Disk: Sales combined with Nylon album; Nylon was the first Dual Disc released in Greece. | Platinum |
| 2006 | Eurovision Song Contest Athens 2006: Anna Vissi represented Greece at the 2006 Eurovision Song Contest with the song "Everything". | - |

== Music videos ==
| Year | Title | Album |
|---|---|---|
| 1979 | "Aftos Pou Perimeno" (The one I'm waiting for) | Kitrino Galazio |
| 1979 | "M' Agapas" (You love me) | Kitrino Galazio |
| 1980 | "Autostop" (Hitchhike) | Epitixies tis Columbia 80' |
| 1980 | "Oso Eho Foni" (As long as I have my voice) | Nai |
| 1980 | "To Xero Thartheis Xana" (I know you're coming again) | Nai |
| 1980 | "Methismeni Politeia" (Drunken state) | Nai |
| 1980 | "Na I Zoi" (To the life) | Nai |
| 1981 | "Anna Vissi Medley" ["Hanomai", "Thelo Mono Esena", "Horis Esena Ego Den Kano", "Tha Borousa", "Kalimera Kainourgia Mou Agapi"] | Anna Vissi |
| 1982 | "Mono I Agapi" (Only love) | Anna Vissi (Re-Release) |
| 1985 | "Kalokairines Diakopes Gia Panta" (Summer vacation forever) | Sa Diskos Palios |
| 1985 | "Dodeka" (Twelve o' clock) | Kati Simveni |
| 1986 | "Se Posa Tablo" (Amounts to dashboard) | I Epomeni Kinisi |
| 1986 | "Otan Kanoume Erota" (When we make love) | I Epomeni Kinisi |
| 1986 | "Pragmata" (Things) | I Epomeni Kinisi |
| 1986 | "Me Agapi Apo Mena Gia Sena" (With love from me to you) | I Epomeni Kinisi |
| 1988 | "1988 Ki Akoma S' Agapo" (1988 and i still love you) | Tora |
| 1988 | "Ta Koritsia Einai Atakta" (Girls being naughty) | Tora |
| 1988 | "Magiko Hali" (Magic carpet) | Tora |
| 1988 | "Ta Mathitika Hronia" (Student years) | Tora |
| 1988 | "Tora" (Now) | Tora |
| 1988 | "Den S' Allazo" (I don't change you) | Tora |
| 1988 | "Empnefsi!" (Inspiration) | Empnefsi! |
| 1988 | "Amore" | Empnefsi! |
| 1988 | "Londino" (London) | Empnefsi! |
| 1988 | "Houla Houp" (Hula hoop) | Empnefsi! |
| 1989 | "Klaio" (I cry) | - |
| 1989 | "The Only Arms We Need" | Music Of The III Games Of The Small States Of Europe |
| 1989 | "Pseftika" (Fake) [Version 'A' and 'B'] | Fotia |
| 1989 | "Balomataki" (Little patch) [Version 'A' and 'B'] | Fotia |
| 1989 | "Fotia" (Fire) | Fotia |
| 1989 | "Kapnizo" (I'm smoking) | Fotia |
| 1989 | "Ouai Ki Alloimono" (Don't you dare) | Fotia |
| 1990 | "Antistrofi Metrisi" (Backward count) [Duet with Nikos Karvelas] | Diavolaki |
| 1990 | "Fos" (Light) | Eimai |
| 1990 | "Ena Sou Leo" (I'll tell you one thing) | Eimai |
| 1991 | "O Teleftaios Horos" (The last dance) [Duet with Nikos Karvelas] | O Teleftaios Horos |
| 1991 | "Sta 79" (At 79) [Duet with Nikos Karvelas] | O Teleftaios Horos |
| 1991 | "Daimones" (Demons) [Duet with Nikos Karvelas] | Daimones |
| 1991 | "Kleino Ta Matia" (I close my eyes) | Daimones |
| 1992 | "Emeis" (We) [Duet with Nikos Karvelas] | Emeis |
| 1992 | "Den Thelo Na Kseris" (I don't want you to know) | Emeis |
| 1992 | "Nai" (Yes) | Emeis |
| 1992 | "Ellada" (Greece) | Emeis |
| 1992 | "Ftaio" (It's my fault) [Duet with Nikos Karvelas] | Emeis |
| 1992 | "Lambo" (I'm shining) | Lambo |
| 1992 | "Akoma Mia" (One more) | Lambo |
| 1992 | "Oti Thes Ego" (Whatever you need I) | Lambo |
| 1992 | "Se Hreiazomai!" (I need you) | Lambo |
| 1993 | "Kolla To!" (High Five) [Duet with Sophia Karvelas] | Kolla To! |
| 1994 | "Re!" (Hey You!) | Re! |
| 1994 | "Eimai Poli Kala" (I am very well) | Re! |
| 1995 | "Amin" (Amen) | Amin (CD Single) |
| 1995 | "Eleni" (Helen) | Amin (CD Single) |
| 1995 | "Eikosi Hronia" (Twenty years) | O! Kypros |
| 1995 | "Metra" (Count) [Duet with Nikos Karvelas] | 25 Ores |
| 1996 | "Trellainomai [Klima Tropiko]" (I go crazy [Tropical climate]) | Klima Tropiko |
| 1996 | "Kai Ti Egine" (And what happened) | Klima Tropiko |
| 1996 | "Parte Ta Ola" (Take them all) | Klima Tropiko |
| 1996 | "Sentonia" (Sheets) | Klima Tropiko |
| 1996 | "Vre Kouto" (You silly) | To Aroma Tis Amartias |
| 1997 | "Travma" (Trauma) | Travma |
| 1997 | "Mavra Gialia" (Black sunglasses) | Travma |
| 1997 | "Na 'Sai Kala" (Be good) | Travma |
| 1997 | "Forgive Me This" | "Forgive Me This (CD Single)" |
| 1998 | "Erotevmenaki" (My little love) | Antidoto |
| 1998 | "S' Eho Epithimisei" (I've missed you) | Antidoto |
| 1998 | "Methismeni Mou Kardia" (My drunken heart) | Antidoto |
| 1998 | "Magava Tout" | Antidoto |
| 1998 | "Pali Gia Sena" (Again for you) | Antidoto |
| 1998 | "Mou Anikeis" (You belong to me) | Antidoto |
| 1998 | "Ena Hrono To Perissotero" (One year the most) [Duet with Nikos Karvelas] | Ena Hrono To Perissotero |
| 2000 | "Ola Einai Entaksi" (Everything is okay) [With Nikos Karvelas and Sophia Karvelas] | Ola Einai Entaksi |
| 2000 | "Everything I Am" | Everything I Am |
| 2000 | "Agapi Ipervoliki" (Excessive love) | Kravgi |
| 2000 | "Kravgi" (Scream) | Kravgi |
| 2000 | "Horis To Moro Mou" (Without my baby) | Kravgi |
| 2000 | "Kalitera I Dio Mas" (Better off together) [Duet with Keti Garbi] [Version 'A' and 'B'] | Kravgi |
| 2000 | "Kravgi Hit Mix" ["Kravgi", "Agapi Ipervoliki", "AAA" (Kai Horisame), "Skizofrenia", "Agapoula Mou", "Horis To Moro Mou", "De Me Agapas", "Atmosfaia Elekrismeni", "Kaka Paidia", "Moni Mou"] | Sto rythmo tou DJ |
| 2002 | "Taseis Aftoktonias" (Suicidal tendencies) | X |
| 2003 | "Pes To Ksana" (Say it sgain) | X |
| 2003 | "Boom - Boom - Boom" [Duet with Nikos Karvelas] | Party Gia Spasmenes Kardies |
| 2003 | "Treno" (Train) | Paraksenes Eikones |
| 2003 | "Eho Pethani Gia Sena" (I have died for you) | Paraksenes Eikones |
| 2004 | "Eisai" (You Are) | Paraksenes Eikones |
| 2004 | "Min Psahnis Tin Agapi" (Don't search for love) | Paraksenes Eikones |
| 2004 | "Psihedeleia" (Psychedelic) | Paraksenes Eikones |
| 2005 | "Den Thelo Na Kseris/Dodeka" (I don't want you to know/Twelve o' clock) | Live |
| 2005 | "Call Me" | "Call Me" (CD Single) |
| 2005 | "Nylon" | Nylon |
| 2006 | "Erota I Polemo" (Love or war) [Duet with Nivo] | Nylon |
| 2006 | "Everything" | Nylon Euro Edition |
| 2008 | "To Parelthon Mou" (My past) | Apagorevmeno |
| 2008 | "Apagorevmeno" (Forbidden) | Apagorevmeno |
| 2009 | "Stin Pira" (To the fire) | Apagorevmeno |
| 2009 | "Alitissa Psihi" (Vagrant soul) | Apagorevmeno |
| 2009 | "Apo Makria Kai Agapimenoi (Alex Papaconstantinou Remix)" (From faraway and loved) | Apagorevmeno+ |
| 2009 | "Fabulous" | Apagorevmeno+ |
| 2010 | "Agapi Einai Esi" (Love is you) | Agapi Einai Esi |
| 2011 | "Leap Of Faith" [Duet with Dave Stewart] | Video Edit |
| 2012 | "Ora Na Fevgo" (Time To Go) | Tiraniemai |
| 2012 | "Tiranieme" (I'm suffering) | Tiraniemai |
| 2013 | "I Kathimerinotita Mas" (Our Daily Routine) | digital single |
| 2015 | "Gia Sena" (For You) | Sinentefxi |
| 2016 | "Xana Mana" (Again and Again) | Sinentefxi |
| 2016 | "Protimo Na Pethaino" (I Prefer Dying) | Sinentefxi |
| 2017 | "Afou" (Because) | digital single |
| 2018 | "Mesa Sou" (Inside Of You) | Iliotropia |
| 2019 | "Osi Agapane Den Pethenoune" featuring Yiota Yianna (The Ones Who Love, They Wont Die) | Iliotropia |
| 2019 | "Iliotropia" (Sunflowers) | Iliotropia |
| 2019 | "Flegomenos Trohos" (Fiery Wheel) | Iliotropia |
| 2020 | "Tromagmeno Mou" (My Frighten One) | digital single |
