= Dance Mixes: Afiste Tin – Tora Arhizoun Ta Dyskola =

Dance Mixes: Afiste Tin & Tora Arhizoun Ta Dyskola Dance Mixes: Αφήστε Την & Τώρα Αρχίζουν Τα Δύσκολα

EP by Sakis Rouvas
- Released: May 24, 2007
- Recorded: 1994–1996
- Genre: Remix, house, latin pop, reggae, electronica
- Language: Greek
- Label: Universal Music Greece, Mercury
- Producer: Nikos Karvelas

Sakis Rouvas chronology
Ta Erotika Sakis Rouvas (2007)	Dance Mixes: Afiste Tin & Tora Arhizoun Ta Dyskola; Dance Mixes: Αφήστε Την & Τώρα Αρχίζουν Τα Δύσκολα (2007)	Alter Ego (2007)

Singles from Dance Mixes
- 1. "Tora Arhizoun Ta Dyskola (7" Latin Dance Mix)" Released: May 2007

Dance Mixes: Afiste Tin & Tora Arhizoun Ta Dyskola (Greek: Dance Mixes: Αφήστε Την & Τώρα Αρχίζουν Τα Δύσκολα; English: Dance Mixes: Leave Her Alone & Now The Difficult Times Begin) is the second EP album by popular Greek pop rock singer Sakis Rouvas, released on May 24, 2007, by his former label Universal Music, along with the imprint of Mercury Records. It features a compilation of previously released remixes of songs recorded from 1994 to 1996 and produced by Nikos Karvelas. The EP was also used as promotion for the box set compilation album Ap'Tin Arhi: I Megaliteres Epitihies released the same year.

== Track listing ==
#	Title	English translation	Original album	Songwriter(s)	Production credit(s)	Time
1.	"Tora Arhizoun Ta Dyskola" (7" Latin Dance Mix)	"Now The Difficult Times Begin"	Tora Arhizoun Ta Dyskola (Re-release)	Natalia Germanou	Nikos Karvelas	4:39
2.	"Afiste Tin" (Dance Mix)	"Leave Her Alone"	Tora Arhizoun Ta Dyskola (Re-release)	Apostolos Diavolikis	Nikos Karvelas	3:35
3.	"Pou Kai Pote" (7" Mix)	"Where and When"	Me Kommeni Tin Anasa	Nikos Karvelas	Nikos Karvelas	4:07
4.	"Tora Arhizoun Ta Dyskola" (Club Mix)	"Now The Difficult Times Begin"	Tora Arhizoun Ta Dyskola (Re-release)	Natalia Germanou	Nikos Karvelas	6:46
5.	"Afiste Tin" (Extended Mix 12")	"Leave Her Alone"	Tora Arhizoun Ta Dyskola (Re-release)	Apostolos Diavolikis	Nikos Karvelas	5:03
6.	"Xana" (Reggae Mix)	"Again"	Me Kommeni Tin Anasa	Nikos Karvelas	Nikos Karvelas	3:48
