= Remixes 2004 =

EP / CD Single by Anna Vissi
- Released: July 22, 2004
- Recorded: 2004 - Bi Kay Studios
- Genre: Pop
- Label: Sony Music Greece/Columbia
- Producer: Nikos Karvelas, Alex Papaconstantinou, Peters Cartriers, Christodoulos Siganos
- Compiler: Nikos Karvelas

Anna Vissi chronology
Paraksenes Eikones (2003)	Remixes 2004 (2004)	Nylon (2005)

"Remixes 2004" is a single by Greek pop singer Anna Vissi, which was released in the summer of 2004 and included in the repackaged edition of her album Paraksenes Eikones, which was also released at the same time. This single featured the song "Eisai" which is the original version of the international hit "Call Me" which topped the Billboard Dance Charts in 2005. It reached Gold status.

== Track listing ==
In addition to the following songs, the disc includes the music video of "Min Psahneis Tin Agapi".

1. "Ego Moro Mou (Elias Pantazopoulos Remix)"
2. "Eho Pethani Gia Sena (Valentino Remix)"
3. "Eisai (The Prodical Son Remix)"
4. "Eisai (Elias Pantazopoulos Remix)"
5. "Fevgo (Sonic Crime Remix)"

== Chart performance ==
Chart	Peak position	Certification
Greek Singles Chart	1	Gold
Cypriot Singles Chart	1	Gold
