= Den Pandrevome =

Den Pandrevome Δεν Παντρεύομαι

Studio album by Nikos Karvelas
- Released: 1985
- Recorded: 1985
- Genre: Contemporary laïka, pop rock
- Length: 27:51
- Language: Greek
- Label: PolyGram Greece, Polydor
- Producer: Nikos Karvelas

Nikos Karvelas chronology
Taxi (1983)	Den Pandrevome; Δεν Παντρεύομαι (1985)	Sa Diskos Palios (1985)

Singles from Taxi
- 1. "Den Pandrevome" Released: 1985

Den Pandrevome (Greek: Δεν Παντρεύομαι; English: I am not getting married) is the third studio album by Greek singer-songwriter and record producer Nikos Karvelas, released 1985 by PolyGram Greece. It marks Karvelas's first Greek-language album, following two earlier English-language releases under the name Nick Carr.

== Track listing ==
All tracks are written by Nikos Karvelas.

No.	Title	Length
1.	"Den Pandrevome" ("I Am Not Getting Married")	2:22
2.	"M'anaveis" ("You Turn Me On")	3:05
3.	"S'agapo" ("I love you")	2:32
4.	"O,ti Mou Zitiseis" ("Whatever You Ask of Me")	4:05
5.	"Ainigma" ("Enigma")	2:39
6.	"Tzous"	3:06
7.	"Mono Esena Kai To Marlboro" ("Only You and Marlboro")	3:17
8.	"Konserto Gia Dyo Piana" ("Concert for Two Pianos")	3:34
9.	"Ti Na Kano" ("What can I Do")	2:32
10.	"Sopen" ("Chopin")	1:59
