= Taxi (Nikos Karvelas album) =

Studio album by Nikos Karvelas
- Released: 1983
- Recorded: 1983
- Genre: Pop rock, dance
- Length: 45:13
- Language: English
- Label: Minos
- Producer: Nikos Karvelas

Nikos Karvelas chronology
Nick Carr (1983)	Taxi (1983)	Den Pandrevome (1985)

Singles from Taxi
- 1. "Take It or Leave It" Released: 1980

Taxi is the second studio album by Greek singer-songwriter and record producer Nikos Karvelas, released by Minos in 1983. It is composed entirely of English-language material.

== Track listing ==
All tracks are written by Nikos Karvelas.

No.	Title	Length
1.	"Breakin' In"	4:30
2.	"Take It or Leave It"	3:47
3.	"Shadows of Beard"	3:23
4.	"Don't Deny Me"	5:07
5.	"No"	1:14
6.	"R.C. Gang"	4:50
7.	"We Re Not Alone"	5:18
8.	"Let Down"	6:05
9.	"Emilia"	4:27
10.	"Suicide Ballad"	3:49
11.	"Gimme"	4:03
