= Apagorevmeno =

Apagorevmeno Απαγορευμένο

Studio album by Anna Vissi
- Released: December 9, 2008
- Recorded: 2008
- Genres: Pop, contemporary laïkó, rock, dance
- Length: 62:25
- Labels: Sony BMG Greece, Columbia
- Producers: Greg Ladanyi, Anna Vissi, C. J. Vanston, Patrick Leonard, Glen Ballard, Matheos Sprague, Giannis Kifonidis, Alex Papakonstantinou, Marcus Englof, Grigoris Kollias

Anna Vissi chronology
Nylon (2005)	Apagorevmeno; Απαγορευμένο (2008)	Agapi Einai Esi (2010)

Singles from Apagorevmeno
- 1. "To Parelthon Mou" Released: 29 October 2008; 2. "Apagorevmeno" Released: 26 November 2008; 3. "Stin Pira" Released: 9 March 2009; 4. "Alitissa Psihi" Released: 3 June 2009; 5. "Apo Makria Kai Agapimenoi (Alex Papakonstantinou Edit)" Released: 11 October 2009; 6. "Fabulous" Released: 22 October 2009

Apagorevmeno (Greek: Απαγορευμένο; English: Forbidden) is Greek singer Anna Vissi's 25th studio album, released in Greece and Cyprus on December 9, 2008, by Sony BMG Greece. It is Vissi's first studio album since 2005 and the first since her 1980 “Nai” album to not include any songs or input by Nikos Karvelas. The album was mostly produced with the Maple Jam Music Group in Los Angeles, United States, and by its head producer Greg Ladanyi.

The album was reissued with three new songs and two remixes as Apagorevmeno + on November 16, 2009.

== Background ==
Vissi had been working on the album for two years. In an interview with Down Town Magazine in July 2008, Vissi said that she felt the same way as she did at the start of her career by having already listened to over 600 songs in the studio in an attempt to find songs she liked. She also stated that this would be the first album of which Nikos Karvelas would not be contributing any songs to, expressing that the two have gotten tired of each other, but clarified that this does not rule out a collaboration in the future.

On October 30, 2008, Vissi gave an interview on MAD TV's OK with Themis Georgandas. She added that ten of the tracks were arranged in Los Angeles, while she had a hand in the production of all tracks. By the end of November, the name Apagorevmeno (Forbidden) had been selected and it was announced that the album would be released on December 9, 2008. The final version contains 15 tracks in total, with the single "To Parelthon Mou" and the cover "Kontra" being included as bonus tracks.

Photographs that Dave Stewart took of Vissi on a beach in Malibu, California were also supposed to be included in the CD booklet but seem to be left out, presumably to be instead included on her never materialised 2010 English language album.

== Production ==
The album was produced with the Maple Jam Music Group in Los Angeles, California, and by its head producer Greg Ladanyi. Vissi is also signed to Maple Jam for artist management since 2008.

Among the original composers were Patrick Leonard and Giannis Kifonidis with three songs each, Giannis Hristoudoulopoulos with two songs and Alex Papakonstantinou, Grigoris Kollias, and Anna Vissi herself with one song each. The songs by Patrick Leonard were originally written with English lyrics for Vissi's possible upcoming, though never released, 2010 English album, but were instead re-recorded using Greek lyrics to appear on this album. The title track "Apagorevmeno" is also co-composed with Kara DioGuardi. Among the lyricists are Mirto Kontova with six songs, Eleana Vrahali with five songs, and Giorgos Mitsigkas, Grigoris Kollias, Valia Kaladzi and Vagellis Papazoulou with one song each.

Three Greek language covers appear on the album: a bonus track, Dan Wilson's song "Breathless" titled "Kontra", Luz Casal's song "Ni Tu Ni Yo" titled "Metallo", and Christina Aguilera's song "That's What Love Can Do" titled "An S'Erotefto". The latter was an Aguilera B-side track composed by Aguilera herself and Glen Ballard which appeared on the limited edition CD Justin & Christina used to promote the Justified and Stripped Tour.

Vissi composed the song "Apo Makria Kai Agapimeni" with lyrics by Mirto Kontova as a reflection of her relationship with Nikos Karvelas. The song "Risko" (Risk) was described by Vissi and its lyricist Eleana Vrahali as a rock zeibekiko, as well as the song "Alitissa Psihi" (Vagrant soul) composed by Vagia Kaladzi with lyrics Giannis Kifonidis received a similar description.

A remake of the Rebetiko song "Pente Hronia Dikasmenos (I Foni Tou Argile)", originally recorded in 1936 by Vangelis Papazoglou, appears on the album as "Pente Hronia Dikasmenos" produced and remixed by Matheos Sprague. Vissi's rendition presents a fusion of vintage Greek urban folk music, or rebetiko, with contemporary urban music by including English language R&B and rapping elements. Argile is Greek for hookah, while the featured rappers also refer to smoking with a hookah pipe.

Composers of the additional songs on re-release of the album titled Apagorevmeno+ include Alex Papaconstantinou, Giannis Kifonidis, and Anna Vissi with one song each. Among the lyricist are Vagia Kalantzi with one song, and Anna Vissi with two songs. In the lyrics for Fabulous, Vissi breaks out of the first-person narrative, referring to herself in the third person by telling the listener that she is going to see her own show to hear "Tsoules" and "Alitissa Psihi".

== Release ==
The release of Apagorevmeno marks Anna Vissi's 25th studio album. It was released on December 9, 2008, in Greece and Cyprus by Sony BMG Greece. It is her first studio album since 2005's Nylon and includes the bonus tracks "To Parelthon Mou" from the soundtrack of the film Bank Bang and a Greek-language cover of Dan Wilson's song "Breathless" titled "Kontra".

Apagorevmeno was repackaged and re-released with three new songs and two remixes as Apagorevmeno + on November 16, 2009. This new 19-track version is in DBS packaging and carries a fixed price of €9.90, roughly half the price of a typical album in the Greek market. The re-release replaces the song "Apo Makria Kai Agapimeni" with the remixed version.

In 2019, the album was selected for inclusion in the Panik Gold box set The Legendary Recordings 1982-2019. The release came after Panik's acquisition rights of Vissi's back catalogue from her previous record company Sony Music Greece. This box set was printed on a limited edition of 500 copies containing CD releases of all of her albums from 1982 to 2019 plus unreleased material.

== Reception ==
=== Commercial performance ===
Professional ratings
Review scores
Source	Rating
Avopolis	2/5 stars
Music Corner	favorable

The newspaper, Real News, distributed the album Apagorevmeno on 8 August 2010. The newspaper sold 60,320 units publication that included the album.

=== Chart performance ===
Apagorevmeno debuted at number three on the IFPI Greek Albums Chart on week 51, and was certified gold within its first week of release. The album moved up to number one on its second week where it remained for its third week, and fell to number nine for its fourth and fifth week.

Though the album was released on December 9, 2008, just three weeks before the end of the year, it still made it into the top ten on both of IFPI's year-end charts: Top 50 Greek albums of 2008 in the 9th spot and Top 50 Greek and Foreign Albums of 2008 in the 10th spot.

In March 2009 IFPI Greece announced that they would close their charts for a period of time in order to renew their charting system, thus it is no longer possible to track sales of "Apagorevmeno". IFPI Greece is set to resume public release of the Greek albums chart in late 2010.

In Cyprus the album debuted at number one of the charts of Musical Paradise (official IFPI representative of Cyprus via IFPI Greece) where it remained for eight weeks. It gained gold status on the second week of its release, and reached platinum status on its eighth. It remained in the top 10 for 12 weeks. In September 2009 during Vissi's visit in Cyprus, Musical Paradise confirmed that the album is officially certified 2× platinum in Cyprus as well. With its re-release the album re-entered the Cypriot official album charts at no1 for a further 3 weeks (making a total of 11) and remained on the top 10 for a further 3 months (24 weeks in top 10 in total).

== Promotion ==
Cosmote once again sponsored a Vissi album, and as in the past, it released a series of commercials for the album including a TV commercial featuring Anna Vissi with the song "Apagorevmeno". On November 26, 2008, Cosmote was the first to release the three songs "Apagorevmeno", "Apo Makria Kai Agapimeni" and "Kontra" onto their music store as part of their mobile music campaign.

On October 29, 2008, the song "To Parelthon Mou" was released simultaneously to all radio stations in Greece and Cyprus along with its music video. It was the theme song from the Greek film Bank Bang, released in December 2008.

On February 10, 2009, Vissi appeared on the Women of the Year 2008 awards by magazine Madame Figaro in Cyprus. At the awards, Vissi announced that she has set up a scholarship fund along with the magazine to award to one young female student annually. Vissi also sang "Apagorevmeno", "Kontra", "To Parelthon Mou" and "Stin Pira".

=== Apagorevmeno Summer Tour ===
Vissi had originally planned to start performing at Athinon Arena in February 2009 in support of the album, however she opted to stage a big concert in Athens during the summer instead, along with a 2009 summer tour around Greece. The tour was titled Apagorevmeno Summer Tour.

=== The Fabulous Show ===
Vissi's concert series for the winter season 2009-2010 was at Athinon Arena and debuted on October 31, 2009, and was concluded on March, 27. Vissi was appearing three times a week and the show was named The Fabulous Show after her single "Fabulous". Supporting acts included the band Ble, Giorgos Sampanis, and Vera Boufi, who is Vissi's niece, special guest star was rebetiko singer Mario.

== Track listing ==
=== Apagorevmeno ===
No.	Title	Writer(s)	Producer(s)	Length
1.	"Apagorevmeno" (Απαγορευμένο; Forbidden)	Patrick Leonard, Kara DioGuardi, Eleana Vrahali	Leonard	4:20
2.	"An S'Erotefto" (Αν σ' ερωτευτώ; If I fall in love with you)	Glen Ballard, Christina Aguilera, Vrahali	Ballard	3:29
3.	"Apo Makria Kai Agapimeni" (Από μακριά και αγαπημένοι; From far away and loved)	Anna Vissi, Mirto Kontova	Vissi, Greg Ladanyi, C. J. Vanston	4:01
4.	"Risko" (Ρίσκο; Risk)	Giannis Hristodoulopoulos, Vrahali	Vissi, Ladanyi	3:30
5.	"Anakohi" (Ανακωχή; Truce)	Leonard, Adam Cohen, Kontova	Leonard	4:19
6.	"Stin Pira" (Στην πυρά; In the fire)	Alex Papaconstantinou, Adam Baptiste, Marcus Englof, Kontova	Papakonstantinou, Englof, Vissi, Ladanyi	3:07
7.	"Pente Hronia Dikasmenos (featuring Ragidy Supreme and Wayne Jobson)" (Πέντε χρόνια δικασμένος; Five years convicted)	Vangelis Papazoglou	Matheos Sprague	5:25
8.	"Metallo" (Μέταλλο; Metal)	Bolero Nordico, Maria Angeles Alvarez Beigbeder Casas, Viviana Alvarez Beigbeder Casas, Kontova	Giannis Kifonidis, Vissi, Ladanyi	3:48
9.	"Kane Kati" (Κάνε κάτι; Do something)	Hristodoulopoulos, Vrahali	Vissi, Ladanyi, Vanston	4:52
10.	"Gia Ena Lepto" (Για ένα λεπτό; For one minute)	Grigoris Kollias	Vissi, Ladanyi, Kollias	4:02
11.	"Alitissa Psihi" (Αλήτισσα ψυχή; Vagrant soul)	Kifonidis, Vagia Kaladzi	Vissi, Ladanyi, Vanston	4:31
12.	"Thelo Mia Agapi" (Θέλω μια αγάπη; I want a love)	Leonard, Adam Cohen, Vrahali	Leonard	4:02
13.	"Pio Konta" (Πιο κοντά; Even closer)	Kifonidis, Kontova	Kifonidis, Vissi, Ladanyi	5:25

Bonus tracks
No.	Title	Writer(s)	Producer(s)	Length
14.	"Kontra" (Κόντρα; Against each other)	Dan Wilson, Kontova	Vissi, Ladanyi, Vanston	3:52
15.	"To Parelthon Mou" (Το παρελθόν μου; My past)	Kifonidis, Giorgos Mitsigkas	Vissi, Ladanyi, Vanston	3:32

=== Apagorevmeno + ===
No.	Title	Writer(s)	Producer(s)	Length
1.	"Apagorevmeno" (Απαγορευμένο; Forbidden)	Patrick Leonard, Kara DioGuardi, Eleana Vrahali	Leonard	4:20
2.	"An S'Erotefto" (Αν σ' ερωτευτώ; If I fall in love with you)	Glen Ballard, Christina Aguilera, Vrahali	Ballard	3:29
3.	"Apo Makria Kai Agapimeni (Remix by Alex Papaconstantinou)" (Από μακριά κι αγαπημένοι; From far away and loved)	Anna Vissi, Mirto Kontova	Vissi, Greg Ladanyi, C. J. Vanston	4:01
4.	"Risko" (Ρίσκο; Risk)	Giannis Hristodoulopoulos, Vrahali	Vissi, Ladanyi	3:30
5.	"Anakohi" (Ανακωχή; Truce)	Leonard, Adam Cohen, Kontova	Leonard	4:19
6.	"Stin Pira" (Στην πυρά; In the fire)	Alex Papakonstantinou, Adam Baptiste, Marcus Englof, Kontova	Papakonstantinou, Englof, Vissi, Ladanyi	3:07
7.	"Pente Hronia Dikasmenos (featuring Ragidy Supreme and Wayne Jobson)" (Πέντε χρόνια δικασμένος; Five years convicted)	Vangelis Papazoglou	Matheos Sprague	5:25
8.	"Metallo" (Μέταλλο; Metal)	Bolero Nordico, Maria Angeles Alvarez Beigbeder Casas, Viviana Alvarez Beigbeder Casas, Kontova	Giannis Kifonidis, Vissi, Ladanyi	3:48
9.	"Kane Kati" (Κάνε κάτι; Do something)	Hristodoulopoulos, Vrahali	Vissi, Ladanyi, Vanston	4:52
10.	"Gia Ena Lepto" (Για ένα λεπτό; For one minute)	Grigoris Kollias	Vissi, Ladanyi, Kollias	4:02
11.	"Alitissa Psihi" (Αλήτισσα ψυχή; Vagrant soul)	Kifonidis, Vagia Kaladzi	Vissi, Ladanyi, Vanston	4:31
12.	"Thelo Mia Agapi" (Θέλω μια αγάπη; I want a love)	Leonard, Adam Cohen, Vrahali	Leonard	4:02
13.	"Pio Konta" (Πιο κοντά; Even closer)	Kifonidis, Kontova	Kifonidis, Vissi, Ladanyi	5:25
14.	"Kontra" (Κόντρα; Against each other)	Dan Wilson, Kontova	Vissi, Ladanyi, Vanston	3:52
15.	"To Parelthon Mou" (Το παρελθόν μου; My past)	Kifonidis, Giorgos Mitsigkas	Vissi, Ladanyi, Vanston	3:32
16.	"Fabulous"			2:58
17.	"Ego S' Agapao" (Εγώ Σ' Αγαπάω; I love you)			3:19
18.	"To Tavli" (Το τάβλι; Backgammon)			4:14
19.	"Stin Pira (Remix by Alex Papaconstantinou)" (Στην πυρά; In the fire)			3:52

== Singles ==
"Apagorevmeno"

The lead single and the album's title track is "Apagorevmeno" (Forbidden). It is composed by Patrick Leonard and Kara DioGuardi, with lyrics by Eleana Vrahali. It was released on November 26, 2008 to radio stations, as well as debuting on the online music store of main sponsor Cosmote. The song was used by Cosmote in their advertising campaigns, including a television advertisement with Vissi. The music video premiered on Vissi's official website on December 14, 2008. The single debuted at #4 on the official Billboard Greek Singles Chart. It peaked at #1 on Christmas week and remained atop for 2 weeks in total.

"Stin Pira"

The second single from the album is "Stin Pira". Written by Alex Papakonstantinou with lyrics by Myrto Kontova, the dance song had been a radio hit since the album's release. A video was filmed at Athinon Arena and was released on March 9, 2008, directed by Greek-American film director Christine Crokos. The video is said to have an international feel to it, with many visual effects and strong choreography throughout the whole video. Vissi is accompanied by four female dancers. Good friend Patricia Field was the fashion stylist, as well as appearing in the uncut version of the video, while she and Greg Ladanyi oversaw the production of the video. Vissi changes outfits seven times. The single had a 12-week run on the Billboard Greek Singles Chart Top 10 chart. It debuted at #10 and peaked at #3 for three non-consecutive weeks.

"Alitissa Psihi"

The third single from the album is "Alitissa Psihi". A music video was filmed in Monument Valley, Arizona, directed by Greek-American film director Christine Crokos and with styling by Patricia Field. Vissi performed the song in 2009 Mad Video Music Awards. The single peaked at #4 of the iTunes Greece digital download charts and at #7 on the Billboard Greek Singles Chart.

"Apo Makria Kai Agapimenoi (Alex Papakonstantinou Edit)"

Vissi announced the fourth single on a radio show, stating she was shooting the music video for the track with Christine Krokos directing once again. The single was a remix by Alex Papakonstantinou which debuted on her Apagorevmeno summer tour and is included on Apagorevmeno+ released on November 16, 2009. Vissi had previously mentioned that "Gia Ena Lepto" would be the fourth single. The music video was shot at a concert in Santorini part of her summer tour on August 16, 2009. Fireworks were shot off during the concert for use in the video. The video was originally supposed to be released on September 27, 2009, but due to the death of her manager Greg Ladanyi, the release date was delayed until October 10, 2009. The video is dedicated to Greg Ladanyi.

"Fabulous"

The song Fabulous premiered exclusively released on Rythmos FM on October 22, 2009. An interview was arranged for November 4, 2009 with Makis Pounentis of Rythmos FM. Upon its release it quickly shot up to the number 1 spot on Rythmos FM's charts. The song was subsequently released as a digital download on November 13, 2009. It is included on the repackaged Apagorevmeno + released on November 16, 2009. The song is composed by Alex Papakonstantinou with lyrics by Vissi and is the theme of Vissi's winter appearances at Athinon Arena titled "The Fabulous Show". The song debuted at number 4 on the Billboard Greek Digital Downloads Chart for the week of December 5, 2009. It peaked at number 11 on the Greek Nielsen Music Control Airplay Chart for the week of November 24–30, taking the highest placing of a Greek language song for the week. A music video was shot and released on March 5, 2010, directed once again by Christine Krokos, presenting Vissi's premiere at Athinon Arena. The video clip of the song was voted as the 10th best video clip of 2010, being the highest placed by any Greek artist that year.

== Personnel ==
=== Management ===
- Maple Jam Music Group – management
- Galaxias Productions – management
- ProgressivePR – public relations
- Niki Boufi – personal assistant
- Sofia Arkele – production assistant
- Nick Sena – production assistant
- Peter Economides – brand direction

=== Performance ===
- Anna Vissi – vocals, background vocals
- Patrick Leonard – background vocals
- Bernadette Barlow – background vocals
- Ragidy Supreme – Rap vocal #1
- Wayne Jobson – Rap vocal #2

=== Visuals and imagery ===
- Panos Pitsilidis – art director
- Christos Sigkounis – art director
- Thanasis Krikis – photographer
- Chrisanthi Thomatou – stylist
- Chara Papanikolaou – make-up artist
- Christos Kalaniotis – hair stylist

=== Instruments ===
- Patrick Leonard - keyboard, strings, piano, drum programming, percussion
- Alex Papaconstantinou - drum programming, bass synthesizer, keyboards, moog synthesizer, electric bass guitar
- Grigoris Kollias - drums, bass guitar, acoustic guitars, electric guitars, moog synthesizer
- C. J. Vanston - keyboards, guitars, strings, piano, vibes, toy piano, drums, bass guitar
- Giannis Kifonidis - strings, drum programming, keyboards, piano, Irish bagpipes, strings arrangement
- Giannis Histodoulopoulos - electric piano, organ
- Zac Rae - keyboards, piano
- Jay Gore - electric guitars, acoustic guitars
- Foivos Zaharopoulos - acoustic guitar, electric guitar
- John Shanks - guitar
- Joel Shearer - guitar
- Tim Pierce - guitar
- Foivos Zaharopoulos - electric guitar
- Leland Sklar - bass guitar
- Sean Hurley - bass guitar
- Takis Fitos - bass guitar
- Sean Hurley - bass guitar
- Stevie Black - strings
- Panagiotis Stergiou - bouzouki
- Jesse String - bouzouki
- Blair Sinta - drums
- Kostas Laskarakis - drums
- Aaron Sterling - drums
- Kostas Liolios - drums
- Ryan Hoyle - drums
- Joe Pusater - percussion
- Stewart Cole - trumpet, flugelhorn
- Jordan Katz - trumpet
- Chris Tedesco - trumpet
- Damanios Dudu - violin
- Wendy Clark - violin
- Rountina Tsanta - violin
- Stella Georgiou - violin
- Misa Smirnof - viola
- Giorgos Giakoumis - viola
- Ivi Papathanasiou - cello
- Haralambos Arkatinis - contrabass

=== Technical and production ===
- Greg Ladanyi - production, recording engineer, mixing
- Anna Vissi - production
- C. J. Vanston - production, recording engineer, mixing
- Patrick Leonard - production, loop programming
- Alex Papakonstantinou - production, recording engineer, mixing
- Giannis Kifonidis - production, recording engineer, sampling, loop programming
- Glen Ballard - production
- Grigoris Kollias - production, recording engineer
- Matheos Sprague - production
- Marcus Englof - production
- Nick Sena - recording engineer
- Michael Perfitt - recording engineer
- Scott Campbell - recording engineer
- Brian Worwick - assistant engineer
- Jolie Levine - production coordinator
- Angela Vicari - production coordinator
- Jesse String - recording engineer
- Mike Degen - recording engineer, mixing
- Tony Cousins - mastering engineer

== Release history ==
Region	Date	Label	Format	Version
Greece	December 9, 2008	Sony BMG, Columbia	CD, Digital download	Original release
Cyprus	December 9, 2008	Sony BMG, Columbia	CD, Digital download	Original release
Greece	November 16, 2009	Sony Music, Columbia	CD, Digital download	Re-release
Cyprus	November 16, 2009	Sony Music, Columbia	CD, Digital download	Re-release

== Charts ==
Chart	Peak position	Weeks on chart	Certification
Greek Albums Chart	1	8	3× Platinum
Cypriot Album Chart	1	25	3× Platinum
Top 50 Greek Albums of 2008	9	—N/a	—N/a
Top 50 Greek and Foreign Albums of 2008	10	—N/a	—N/a
