= List of awards and nominations received by Michalis Hatzigiannis =

Michalis Hatzigiannis awards and nominations
Awards and nominations
Award	Wins	Nominations
Arion Music Awards	20	16
Cyprus Music Awards	5	2
MAD Video Music Awards	11	33
Man of the Year Awards	3	0
MTV Europe Music Awards	0	2
Pop Coron Music Awards	1	1
Prosopa	2	0
Status Man of the Year Awards	3	0
World Music Awards	0	1

Totals (Note: Certain award groups do not simply award one winner. They acknowledge several different recipients, have runners-up, and have third place. Since this is a specific recognition and is different from losing an award, runner-up mentions are considered wins in this award tally. For simplification and to avoid errors, each award in this list has been presumed to have had a prior nomination.)
- Wins: 46
- Nominations: 56

This is a list of awards and nominations received by Michalis Hatzigiannis.

== Arion Music Awards ==
Hatzigiannis received 20 awards from 16 nominations.

Year	Recipient	Award	Result
2002	Ena Pedi Pou Perpataei Me Ta Heria	Song of the Year	Nominated
2002	Ena Pedi Pou Perpataei Me Ta Heria	Best Pop Singer	Nominated
I Titli Tou Telous (Sleepy Hollow Mix)	Singer of the Year	Nominated	
2003	To S' Agapo	Song of the Year	Nominated
2003	Krifo Fili	Best Entekhno Album	Nominated
2003	Krifo Fili	Best Pop Album	Won
2003	Krifo Fili	Best Entekhno Singer	Won
2003	Krifo Fili	Best Pop Singer	Won
2003	Krifo Fili	Singer of the Year	Nominated
2003	Krifo Fili	Album of the Year	Nominated
2004	An Mou Tinefonouses	Song of the Year	Nominated
2004	An Mou Tinefonouses	Best Entekhno Song	Won
2004	Monos Mou	Highest Selling for Greek CD Single	Won
2004	Monos Mou	Best Modern Laïko Song	Won
2004	Monos Mou	Singer of the Year	Won
2005	Akatallili Skini	Best Entekhno Album	Nominated
2005	Akatallili Skini	Best Pop Singer	Won
2005	Akatallili Skini	Best Pop Album	Won
2005	Akatallili Skini	Best Singer - Entekhno	Nominated
2005	Akatallili Skini	Singer of the Year	Nominated
2005	Akatallili Skini	Album of the Year	Won
2005	Gia Sena	Song of the Year	Nominated
2005	Gia Sena	Best Pop Song	Won
2005	Pou Einai I Agapi	Best Entekhno Song	Nominated
2006	Oneiro Ζο	Best Pop Song	Nominated
2006	Oneiro Ζο	Singer of the Year	Nominated
2006	Oneiro Ζο	Song of the Year	Nominated
2006	Na Meineis Edo	Best Entekhno Song	Won
2007	Na Eisai Ekei	Best Laïko Song	Won
2007	Den Fevgo	Best Entekhno Song	Won
2007	Filoi Kai Ehthroi	Best Pop Album	Won
2007	Filoi Kai Ehthroi	Album of the Year	Won
2007	Filoi Kai Ehthroi	Singer of the Year	Won
2007	Ola I Tipota	Song of the Year	Won
2007	Ola I Tipota	Highest Selling for Greek CD Single	Won
2007	Live	Best Laïko Album	Nominated
2007	Live	Highest Selling for Greek Album	Won

== Cyprus Music Awards ==
Year	Recipient	Award	Result
2006	Oneiro Ζο	Best Greek Single	Won
2006	De Fevgo	Best Greek Song (Music & Lyrics)	Won
2006	Himself	Best Singer	Nominated
2007	Ola I Tipota	Best Greek Single	Won
2007	Heria Psila	Best Greek Song (Music & Lyrics)	Nominated
2007	Filoi Kai Ehthroi	Best Greek Album	Won
2007	Himself	Best Singer	Won

== MAD Video Music Awards ==
Hatzigiannis received 11 awards from 33 nominations.

Year	Recipient	Award	Result
2004	Monos Mou	Best Pop Video Clip	Won
2004	Monos Mou	Best Video Clip of the Year	Won
2004	Monos Mou	Best Video Clip for Male Artist	Nominated
2004	Monos Mou	Sexiest Appearance in a Video Clip	Nominated
2004	Party (Unplugged)	Best Entekhno Video Clip	Won
2005	Gia Sena	Best Video Clip of the Year	Won
2005	Gia Sena	Best Pop Video Clip	Nominated
2005	Gia Sena	Best Video Clip for Male Artist	Nominated
2005	Pou Einai I Agapi	Best Entekhno Video Clip	Nominated
2005	Himself	Artist of the Year with the Most Played Video Clip	Nominated
2006	Oneiro Zo	Best Video Clip for Male Artist	Nominated
2006	Oneiro Zo	Best Pop Video Clip	Nominated
2007	Ola I Tipota	Best Video Clip - Pop	Won
2007	Ola I Tipota	Best Video Clip for Male Artist	Won
2007	Ola I Tipota	Best Video Clip of the Year	Won
2007	Himself	Artist of the Year with the Most Played Video Clip	Won
2008	Pio Poli	Best Pop Video Clip	Nominated
2008	Pio Poli	Best Male Artist	Nominated
2008	Pio Poli	Video Clip of the Year	Nominated
2008	O Paradisos (De Ftiahtike Gia Mas) (w/ Despina Olympiou)	Best Duet/Collaboration	Won
2008	Himself	Artist of the Year	Nominated
2008	Heria Pisla	Best Lyrics/Catchphrase	Nominated
2009	Etsi Se Thelo	Video Clip of the Year	Nominated
2009	Etsi Se Thelo	Best Pop Video Clip	Nominated
2009	Anapoda	Best Male Artist	Nominated
2009	Anapoda	Artist of the Year	Nominated
2010	Par' Ta Ola Dika Sou	Best Male Artist	Won
2011	To Kalokairi Mou	Best Video Pop Clip	Nominated
2011	To Kalokairi Mou	Video Clip of the Year	Nominated
2011	Mia Ap Ta Idia	Artist of the Year	Nominated
2011	Mia Ap Ta Idia	Best Male Artist	Nominated
2012	Tharros I Alitheia	Best Video Pop Clip	Nominated
2012	Tharros I Alitheia	Video Clip of the Year	Won
2012	Himself	Best Male Artist	Nominated
2012	Himself	Artist of the Year - Cyprus	Nominated
2012	Himself	Artist Of The Year	Nominated
2013	Se Ena Toixo (w/ Midenistis)	Best Urban Video Clip	Nominated
2013	Se Ena Toixo (w/ Midenistis)	Best Duet/Collaboration	Nominated
2013	Himself	Best Male Artist	Nominated
2013	Himself	Artist of the Year - Cyprus	Nominated
2013	Himself	Artist of the Year	Nominated
2014	I Agapi Dinamonei	Best Pop rock Video Clip	Nominated
2014	I Agapi Dinamonei	Song of the Year	Nominated
2021	Horevo	Best Modern Male Singer	Nominated

== Man of the Year Awards ==
Year	Award	Result
2008	Singer of the Year	Won
2011	Most Popular Personality of the Decade	Won
2019	20 Years of Supply	Won

== MTV Europe Music Awards ==
Year	Award	Result
2008	Best Greek Act	Nominated
2013	Best Greek Act	Nominated

== Pop Corn Music Awards ==
Year	Recipient	Result	Award
2001	Paraxeni Giorti	Best New Artist	Won
2001	Mono Sta Oneira	Best Composition	Nominated

== Prosopa Awards ==
Year	Recipient	Award	Result
2006	Kinoumeni Ammos	Best Original Music for Series	Won
2010	I Polykatoikia	Best Original Music for Greek Production	Won

== Status Man of the Year Awards ==
Year	Award	Result
2006	Singer of the Year	Won
2007	Composer of the Year	Won
2008	Singer of the Year	Won

== Super Music Awards 2021 ==
Year	Recipient	Award	Result
2021	Kanenas Monos	Single of the Year	Nominated
2021	Himself	Best Male (Modern)	Nominated

== World Music Awards ==
Year	Recipient	Award	Result
2013	Best Male Artist	Himself	Nominated
