= Dimosies Scheseis =

Dimosies Scheseis Δημόσιες Σχέσεις

Studio album by Nikos Karvelas
- Released: June 1988
- Recorded: 1988
- Genre: Dance-pop, rock 'n' roll
- Length: 42:18
- Language: Greek
- Label: CBS Greece

Nikos Karvelas chronology
Ola I Tipota (1987)	Dimosies Scheseis; Δημόσιες Σχέσεις (1988)	Tsouzi (1989)

Singles from Dimosies Scheseis
- 1. "Dimosies Scheseis" Released: 1988; 2. "Vlakas" Released: 1988; 3. "Pote Mi Les Pote" Released: 1988

Dimosies Scheseis (Greek: Δημόσιες Σχέσεις; English: Public relations) is the sixth studio album by Greek singer-songwriter and record producer Nikos Karvelas, released by CBS Records Greece in 1988. In 1996, a remastered version of the album was released.

== Track listing ==
No.	Title	Lyrics	Music	Length
1.	"Se Thelo Pali (Ki As Me Mazevoun Me To Koutali)" (I want you again (Even if they scoop me up with a spoon))	Nikos Karvelas	Nikos Karvelas	2:55
2.	"Agapi Mou Skotostra" (My killer love)	Nikos Karvelas	Nikos Karvelas	3:34
3.	"Pote Mi Les Pote" (Never say never)	Nikos Karvelas	Nikos Karvelas	4:37
4.	"Kalitere Kakos Para Ilithios" (Better be bad than an idiot)	Nikos Karvelas	Nikos Karvelas	3:30
5.	"O Kathenas Gia Parti Tou" (Everyone for themselves)	Nikos Karvelas	Nikos Karvelas	3:36
6.	"Dimosies Scheseis" (Public relations)	Nikos Karvelas	Nikos Karvelas	4:17
7.	"Pida" (Jump)	Nikos Karvelas	Nikos Karvelas	3:45
8.	"Bounies - Klotsies" (Punches - Kicks)	Nikos Karvelas	Nikos Karvelas	3:02
9.	"Dekatriaris" (Thirteen-man)	Nikos Karvelas	Nikos Karvelas	3:01
10.	"A Re Ethnikara" (Ah my nation)	Nikos Karvelas	Nikos Karvelas	4:36
11.	"Vlaka" (Stupid)	Nikos Karvelas	Nikos Karvelas	2:42
12.	"Sto Strato" (In the military)	Nikos Karvelas	Nikos Karvelas	4:43
