= Moda Records =

Record Label

Moda Records is a record label servicing hip hop, urban, rap, dance and pop music artists. Spearheaded by Nicky Kalliongis, Moda Records has been since its inception on the forefront of discovering alternate methods to producing music in addition to directing artists’ careers.

== Artists ==
Anna Vissi, Flexy, Helena Paparizou, Dimension X, Jus Jack and Thalía have signed with Moda Records.

== Chart success ==
Although Moda Records is a newcomer to the music world, it has had some success in the dance world:

- In 2004 Flexy's song "Mamasita" enjoyed success in the top 10 of Billboard's dance charts, and it has gone number 1 on the DMX dance charts.
- In 2005, Anna Vissi reached the number one spot on the Billboard dance charts with her song "Call Me".
- In 2006 Helena Paparizou's My Number One claimed the 8th spot on the chart.

== Name ==
When working with Anna Vissi, Moda Records takes on a second name "Vanilla/Moda Records".

== See also ==
- List of record labels
