= Thriler =

Thriler Θρίλερ

Studio album by Nikos Karvelas
- Released: November 2006
- Recorded: 2006
- Genre: Pop rock, soft rock
- Length: 41:56
- Language: Greek
- Label: Legend
- Producer: Nikos Karvelas

Nikos Karvelas chronology
Robot (2002)	Thriler; Θρίλερ (2006)	Trakter (2007)

Singles from Thriler
- 1. "Varieme" Released: November 2006; 2. "Annita" Released: February 2006

Thriler (Greek: Θρίλερ; English: Thriller) is the 17th studio album by Greek singer-songwriter and record producer Nikos Karvelas, released by Legend Recordings in 2006. It reached number 10 on the Greek Albums Chart.

== Track listing ==
No.	Title	Lyrics	Music	Length
1.	"Varieme" (I am bored)	Nikos Karvelas	Nikos Karvelas	4:09
2.	"Agrimi" (Wild beast)	Nikos Karvelas	Nikos Karvelas	2:59
3.	"Thriler" (Thriller)	Nikos Karvelas	Nikos Karvelas	4:24
4.	"Melangholiko Koritsi" (Sad girl)	Nikos Karvelas	Nikos Karvelas	4:32
5.	"Giati Na Mi Ginete" (Why should it not happen)	Nikos Karvelas	Nikos Karvelas	3:24
6.	"Ptomata" (Corpses)	Nikos Karvelas	Nikos Karvelas	3:06
7.	"Mia Thlipsi Magiki" (A magical sadness)	Nikos Karvelas	Nikos Karvelas	4:16
8.	"Christe" (Christ)	Nikos Karvelas	Nikos Karvelas	2:59
9.	"Kaneis" (You do)	Nikos Karvelas	Nikos Karvelas	2:41
10.	"Annita"	Nikos Karvelas	Nikos Karvelas	3:43
11.	"Libido"	Nikos Karvelas	Nikos Karvelas	3:37
12.	"Mikrovio" (Microbe)	Nikos Karvelas	Nikos Karvelas	4:06
