= Trakter =

Trakter Τράκτερ

Studio album by Nikos Karvelas
- Released: December 2007
- Recorded: 2007
- Genre: Pop rock, soft rock
- Length: 46:31
- Language: Greek
- Label: Pan-Vox
- Producer: Nikos Karvelas

Nikos Karvelas chronology
Thriler (2006)	Trakter; Τράκτερ (2007)	Adio Heimona (2009)

Singles from Trakter
- 1. "Poios Fovate Ton Passari" Released: October 2007; 2. "I Nea Genia" Released: December 2007; 3. "Arrosta" Released: March 2008; 4. "I Lisi" Released: June 2008

Trakter (Greek: Τράκτερ; English: Tractor) is the 18th studio album by Greek singer-songwriter and record producer Nikos Karvelas, released by Music Box International's Pan-Vox label in December 2007. The album peaked at number 40 on the Greek Albums Chart.

== Track listing ==
No.	Title	Lyrics	Music	Length
1.	"Nea Genia" (New generation)	Nikos Karvelas	Nikos Karvelas	3:52
2.	"Arrosta" (Sick)	Nikos Karvelas	Nikos Karvelas	4:03
3.	"I Lisi" (The solution)	Nikos Karvelas	Nikos Karvelas	3:42
4.	"Stratopedo Singkendrosis" (Concentration camp)	Nikos Karvelas	Nikos Karvelas	4:32
5.	"Alitheia Sto Lao" (Truth to the people)	Nikos Karvelas	Nikos Karvelas	4:13
6.	"I Apati" (The unfaithfulness)	Nikos Karvelas	Nikos Karvelas	3:43
7.	"Pote Tha Halasi O Kairos" (The weather will never be bad)	Nikos Karvelas	Nikos Karvelas	4:27
8.	"Ston Andron" (To men)	Nikos Karvelas	Nikos Karvelas	3:46
9.	"O Paradeisos Pouliete Me To Tetragoniko" (Paradise is being sold by the square meter)	Nikos Karvelas	Nikos Karvelas	4:26
10.	"Trakter" (Tractor)	Nikos Karvelas	Nikos Karvelas	3:43
11.	"Koufalitses"	Nikos Karvelas	Nikos Karvelas	3:43
12.	"Pios Fovate Ton Pasari" (Who is afraid of Pasaris)	Nikos Karvelas	Nikos Karvelas	3:53
13.	"Gia Poso Akoma The Gyrizi I Gi" (For how much longer will the Earth revolve)	Nikos Karvelas	Nikos Karvelas	5:40
