= Eimai =

Studio album by Anna Vissi
- Released: December 14, 1990
- Recorded: 1990
- Genre: Pop, laika
- Label: CBS Greece
- Producer: Nikos Karvelas

Anna Vissi chronology
Fotia (1989)	Eimai (1990)	Emeis (1992)

Singles from Eimai
- 1. "Fos" Released: December 1990; 2. "Ena Sou Leo" Released: February 1991; 3. "Ime" Released: April 1991; 4. "Adika" Released: July 1991; 5. "Ipervoles" Released: September 1991

Eimai (Greek: Είμαι; English: I Am) is the name of a Greek album by singer Anna Vissi released in Greece and Cyprus in 1990 by CBS Greece.

== Background ==
The coda of the song "Perimeno Tilefonima Sou" is a tribute to the musical The Phantom of the Opera by Andrew Lloyd Webber. The album's proposed title was Ipervoles (Exaggerations), but finally the title of the first track was opted for instead.

The music video for the album's first single, "Fos", shot in late 1990 in the area of Lavrio, is noted as being one of the first ever large-scale music video production in Greece. Vissi is portrayed as Esmeralda from Victor Hugo's classic novel The Hunchback of Notre-Dame, published in 1831. Quasimodo's part was portrayed by the video's director Nikos Soulis.

The music video for the second single, "Ena Sou Leo", was initially based on Greek Hollywood actress Melina Merkouri's famous scene from the film Stella, where, following the movie's plot, Vissi is finally killed by her boyfriend. After production was over, Vissi and Nikos Karvelas decided that it was scandalously raw for the Greek market, so they re-filmed it with Vissi singing in the rain. Korais Square in Panepistimiou Street, Athens was chosen as the filming location. Despite being a simple video, it was widely acclaimed by fans.

Both videos were selected for digital release on 2001's The Video Collection.

The album itself was commercially and critically acclaimed, with sales reaching Gold status, selling approximately 50,000 copies and becoming one of the most commercial Greek albums of 1991.

In 1997, it was re-released for the Greek market as a part of the OK! Budget Price series Sony Music Greece launched at the time.

In 2019, the album was selected for inclusion in the Panik Gold box set The Legendary Recordings 1982–2019. The release came after Panik's acquisition rights of Vissi's back catalogue from her previous record company Sony Music Greece. This box set was printed on a limited edition of 500 copies containing CD releases of all of her albums from 1982 to 2019 plus unreleased material.

== Track listing ==
All music and lyrics by Nikos Karvelas.

1. "Ime" (I am)
2. "Adika" (Unjustly)
3. "Fos" (Light)
4. "Perimeno Tilefonima Sou" (I'm waiting for your call)
5. "Ipopsies" (Suspicions)
6. "Ena Sou Leo" (I tell you one thing)
7. "I Zoi Sinehizete" (Life goes on)
8. "Ipervoles" (Exaggerations)
9. "Ksehnas" (You forget)
10. "Mono Ena Thavma" (Only a miracle)

== Singles ==
- "Fos"
- "Ena Sou Leo"
- "Ime"
- "Adika"
- "Ipervoles"

== Credits and personnel ==
Personnel

- Nikos Karvelas – music, lyrics
- Tony Kontaxakis – electric guitar (Core Amps)
- Anna Vissi – vocals
- Kostas Thomaïdis – mandolin

Production

- Nikos Karvelas/Sony Music – production management
- Nikos Karvelas – arrangements, instrument playing
- Manolis Vlachos – computer programming, recording engineering, remixing at Studio IN

Design

- Dinos Diamantopoulos – photos
- Achilleas Charitos – styling, make up
- Akis D. Gounaris – cover design
- AKMI – films
- Orfanos-Skaltsas – printing

Credits adapted from the album's liner notes.
