= Fotia (album) =

Studio album by Anna Vissi
- Released: December 12, 1989
- Label: CBS Greece
- Producer: Nikos Karvelas

Anna Vissi chronology
Empnefsi! (1988)	Fotia (1989)	Eimai (1990)

Singles from Fotia
- 1. "Pseftika" Released: December 12, 1989; 2. "Fotia" Released: March 1990; 3. "Mpalomataki" Released: June 1990; 4. "Oue Ki Alimono" Released: August 1990; 5. "Kapnizo" Released: October 1990

Fotia (Greek: Φωτιά; English: Fire) is the name of a Greek album by singer Anna Vissi. It was released in Greece and Cyprus in 1989 by CBS Greece. The album is entirely composed and written by Nikos Karvelas. The album reached platinum status. By 1990, the album sold more than 180,000 copies, and became the second best-selling album of 1990 in Greece.

== Singles and legacy ==
"Pseftika" The album's first single "Pseftika" was among the first hit songs in Greece mixing Western dance vibes with Eastern sounds from India, Turkey and Greece. Nightclubs heavily played the modern Greek song, which until then nightclubs distinguished from their bouzoukia counterparts generally played only foreign music. It was so different from what Vissi had sung that she did not want to initially record the song, but ironically it turned out to be one of her biggest hits. Thus, "Pseftika" is noted as revolutionary to modern Greek song. A music video, directed by Nikos Soulis, accompanied the single release, gaining significant airplay on the first local non-state TV stations that officially aired at the time. Its innovative imagery and use of digital techniques revolutionized the art of video clip in Greece and set a milestone for fellow artists to produce their own videos during the oncoming 90s decade. It was released digitally on 2001's The Video Collection

"Fotia"

The 2nd single which had a rock sound followed the success of Pseftika.

"Mpalomataki"

The 3rd single, the music video for the single was filmed in Morocco for a TV-special aired by Mega Channel in early 1990.

"Oue Ki Alimono"

The 4th single climbed on the Top 10 of Greek and Cypriot Charts.

"Kapnizo"

The 5th single also climbed on the Top 10 of Greek and Cypriot Charts.

In 2019, the album was selected for inclusion in the Panik Gold box set The Legendary Recordings 1982-2019. The release came after Panik's acquisition rights of Vissi's back catalogue from her previous record company Sony Music Greece. This box set was printed on a limited edition of 500 copies containing CD releases of all of her albums from 1982 to 2019 plus unreleased material.

== Track listing ==
1. "Pseftika" (Fake)
2. "Ksanagirisa" (I'm back)
3. "Mpalomataki" (Little patch)
4. "Se Skeftome Sinehia" (I keep thinking of you)
5. "Fotia" (Fire)
6. "Kapnizo" (I smoke)
7. "Ti Mou Kanis" (What are you doing to me?)
8. "Voithia" (Help)
9. "Oue Ki Alimono" (Woe and alas)
10. "Telios Erotas" (Perfect love)

== Personnel ==
Credits adapted from the album's liner notes.

- Alex Douglas - Warwick bass
- Tony Kontaxakis - guitars
- Nikos Karvelas - music, lyrics
- Anna Vissi - vocals

Production

- Nikos Karvelas/Sony Music - production management
- Nikos Karvelas - arrangements, instrument playing
- Remy Goux - recording engineering, mixing at Studio IN
- Thodoris Chrysanthopoulos, Fabelsound - transfer
- Giannis Ioannidis, DPH - digital mastering

Design

- Dinos Diamantopoulos - photos
- Achilleas Charitos - make up
- Mike Nikolatos - styling
- Nikolas Tzivas-Petrovas - cover design
- AKMI - films
- Michalis Orfanos - printing

== Certifications ==
Region	Certification	Certified units/sales
Greece (IFPI Greece)	Platinum	100,000^{^}
^{^} Shipments figures based on certification alone.
