= Annita Pania =

Greek television host

Anastasia "Annita" Pania (born 25 April 1970) is a Greek television hostess.

Before presenting her first dating show, "To Chryso Koufeto" ("The Golden Sugarplum"), she was a teacher of French language and a songwriter.

== Biography ==
She was married to composer-songwriter Nikos Karvelas, who provided a steady stream of songs for the "talents" of her TV show, "Je t'Aime". Recent underground hits include "To 'ho Anagi Poly" ("I need it desperately") and "Sex, Gardouba kai doner", the latter being a hymn to unrequited love and eating banquets.

On 1 January 2008, she gave birth to a son. In November 2008, Pania and Karvelas were arrested by the police after a police chase, which started off with them running a red light. The incident supposedly started when the car driven by Karvelas ran a red light. Police then began to chase them and turned their sirens on to pull them over. Karvelas continued on, running further red lights and driving erratically. Pania and Karvelas allege that they were listening to a new song that Karvelas wrote, with the volume up high, did not hear any sirens and were not aware of any police chasing them. They also deny ever running the red light.

Later, the couple claimed that the policemen not only were overzealous, commanding and rude (using the word "re") but also threatened them with their weapons. Pania also mentioned later on TV that she does respect the police, but on the other hand the couple would not comply to bullies, "cops" and "baskines" (pejorative word signifying policemen with improper attitude), whose insulting behavior reminded of the Greek Junta. The couple vowed to take the subject up in court.

Pania and Karvelas were later charged in court, found guilty and sentenced to 14 and 10 months in jail respectively, though they were allowed to buy out their sentences.

She has released a book, "I Ekdikisi tou Kolohartou" ("The Revenge of the Toilet Paper," ISBN 960-397-489-7).

== Filmography ==
=== Television ===
Year	Title	Role(s)	Notes
1995–1998	To Chryso Coufeto	Herself (host)	Weekend dating interactive show; also creator
1998–1999	Spania Poulia	Herself (host)	Weekend talk show; also creator
1999	Me Phora	Herself (host)	Game show (9 episodes)
1999–2001	Koritsia i andres	Herself (host)	Daytime game show; also creator
2001–2012	Ta Paratragouda	Herself (host)	Weekend variety trash show; also creator
2002–2006	Aypnies	Herself (host)	Late night talk show; also creator
2006–2008	Je t' aimes	Herself (host)	Late night variety trash show; also creator
2008	Isodos Eleftheri	Herself (host)	Late night variety trash show; also creator
2009–2010	Zamanfou	Herself (host)	Late night variety trash show; also creator
2010–2012	Isodos Eleftheri 2	Herself (host)	Late night variety show; also creator
2012–2014	Annita SOS	Herself (host)	Weekend daytime talk show
2014–2018	Annita GR	Herself (host)	Weekend daytime talk show
2015–2016	Parole!	Herself (host)	Late night talk show
2016–2017	Kane mou like	Herself (host)	Talent show; also creator
2018–2019	Annita Airlines	Herself (host)	Weekend daytime talk show
2019–2021	Annita Kita	Herself (host)	Weekend daytime talk show
2021–2022	Anihta me tin Annita Pania	Herself (host)	Late night talk show; also creator
2023	Eleos!	Herself (host)	Late night talk show
2024	Next Please!	Herself (host)	Weekend game show
