= Emeis =

Studio album by Anna Vissi and Nikos Karvelas
- Released: May 28, 1992
- Studio: Home Studio
- Genre: Greek, pop, ballad
- Label: Sony Music Greece/Columbia
- Producer: Nikos Karvelas

Anna Vissi chronology
Eimai (1990)	Emeis (1992)	Lambo (1992)

Nikos Karvelas chronology
O Teleftaios Horos (1991)	Emeis (1992)	Ikto!: 20 Megales Epitihies Tou (1992)

Singles from Emeis
- 1. "Emeis" Released: 1992; 2. "Den Thelo Na Xereis" Released: 1992; 3. "Mouri" Released: 1992; 4. "Fteo" Released: 1992; 5. "Aksize" Released: 1992; 6. "Nai" Released: 1992

Emeis (Greek: Εμείς; English: We) is a Greek album by singers Anna Vissi and Nikos Karvelas. It was released in Greece and Cyprus in 1992 by Sony Music Greece and was certified gold. It features Vissi's song Den Thelo Na Xereis.

== Background and release ==
Music and lyrics are by Nikos Karvelas. It included two duets with Anna Vissi, Emeis ("We") and Fteo ("It's my fault"), break-up themed songs reflecting aspects of their marriage, as the couple were filing for divorce at the time. The vocals on the A side of the record (tracks 2, 3, 4, 5 on CD) were performed by Anna Vissi, whereas on the B side (CD tracks 6, 7, 9, 10) by Karvelas himself, who also played instruments and produced all tracks.

The album's biggest hit, though, Den Thelo Na Xereis ("I don't want you to know"), an operatic power-ballad featuring Anna Vissi on the lead vocals, was met with acclaim, becoming one of the singer's signature songs and one of the most popular Greek songs of the 1990s.

Emeis, Fteo, Mouri, Den Thelo Na Xereis, Nai, Aksize and Mesa Sou were officially released on promotional clips at the time, airing in local TV stations. Off the seven, Emeis and Den Thelo Na Xereis were selected for digital release on Vissi's 2001 The Video Collection

In 2019, the album was selected for inclusion in the Panik Gold box set The Legendary Recordings 1982-2019. The release came after Panik's acquisition rights of Vissi's back catalogue from her previous record company Sony Music Greece. This box set was printed on a limited edition of 500 copies containing CD releases of all of her albums from 1982 to 2019 plus unreleased material.

== Track listing ==
1. "Emeis" ("We") (Anna Vissi and Nikos Karavelas Duet)
2. "Den Thelo Na Xereis" ("I don't want you to know") (Anna Vissi)
3. "Nai" ("Yes") (Anna Vissi)
4. "Tha Ekana Otidipote" ("I would do anything") (Anna Vissi)
5. "Ellada" ("Greece") (Anna Vissi)
6. "Mesa Sou" ("Inside you") (Nikos Karvelas)
7. "Mouri" ("Face") (Nikos Karvelas)
8. "Fteo" ("It's my fault") (Anna Vissi and Nikos Karavelas Duet)
9. "Aksize" ("Worth it") (Nikos Karvelas)
10. "Girna Moro Mou" ("Come back my baby") (Nikos Karvelas)

== Singles ==
- "Emeis"
- "Den Thelo Na Xeris"
- "Mouri"
- "Fteo"
- "Aksize"
- "Nai"

== Credits and personnel ==
Credits adapted from the album's liner notes.

Personnel

- Nikos Karvelas - music, lyrics
- Tony Kontaxakis - electric guitar
- Anna Vissi - vocals

Production

- Nikos Karvelas - production management, arrangements, instrumentation, instrument playing
- Haris Andreadis - additional arrangements on track “Emeis”
- Manolis Vlachos - computer programming, recording engineering, sound remixing at home studio

Design

- Dinos Diamantopoulos - photos
- Yiannis Doxas - cover design
- Michalis Orfanos - cover printing
