= Tsouzi =

Tsouzi Τσούζει

Studio album by Nikos Karvelas
- Released: April 1989
- Recorded: 1989
- Genre: Psychedelic rock, rock 'n' roll, dance-pop
- Length: 55:17
- Language: Greek
- Label: CBS Greece
- Producer: Nikos Karvelas

Nikos Karvelas chronology
Dimosies Scheseis (1988)	Tsouzi; Τσούζει (1989)	Diavolaki (1990)

Singles from Tsouzi
- 1. "Souzi - Tsouzi" Released: 1989; 2. "Ta Megala Stithia" Released: 1989; 3. "Nadia" Released: 1989; 4. "Bes Pandou" Released: 1989

Tsouzi (Greek: Τσούζει; English: It burns) is the seventh studio album by Greek singer-songwriter and record producer Nikos Karvelas, released by CBS Records Greece in April 1989. In 1997, a remastered version of the album was released, with the same track list as on the initial 1989 CD version.

== Track listing ==
No.	Title	Lyrics	Music	Length
1.	"Souzi - Tsouzi" (Suzie - It burns)	Nikos Karvelas	Nikos Karvelas	3:12
2.	"Ta Megala Stithia" (The large chests)	Nikos Karvelas	Nikos Karvelas	4:47
3.	"I Istoria Tou Tarzan Kai Tis Tzeïn" (The story of Tarzan and Jane)	Nikos Karvelas	Nikos Karvelas	3:21
4.	"Syn Athina Kai Heira Kini" (Plus Athens and command initiating)	Nikos Karvelas	Nikos Karvelas	4:21
5.	"Dynamitis" (Dynamite)	Nikos Karvelas	Nikos Karvelas	2:50
6.	"Nadia"	Nikos Karvelas	Nikos Karvelas	3:35
7.	"Bes Pandou" (Enter everywhere)	Nikos Karvelas	Nikos Karvelas	3:00
8.	"Sto Spiti Mou To Patriko" (In my paternal home)	Nikos Karvelas	Nikos Karvelas	3:07
9.	"I Triti Ilikia" (The third generation)	Nikos Karvelas	Nikos Karvelas	4:39
10.	"Anna"	Nikos Karvelas	Nikos Karvelas	3:54
11.	"Kalokairines Diakopes Gia Panda" (Summer holidays forever†)	Nikos Karvelas	Nikos Karvelas	3:30
12.	"Sa Diskos Palios" (Like an old record†)	Nikos Karvelas	Nikos Karvelas	4:23
13.	"Se Thelo Pali (Ki As Me Mazevoun Me To Koutali)" (I want you again (even if they scoop me up with a spoon)†)	Nikos Karvelas	Nikos Karvelas	2:53
14.	"Pote Mi Les Pote" (Never Say Never†)	Nikos Karvelas	Nikos Karvelas	4:33
15.	"Ola I Tipota" (All or nothing†)	Nikos Karvelas	Nikos Karvelas	3:12
16.	"Vlaka" (Dumbass†)	Nikos Karvelas	Nikos Karvelas	2:40

† Included on the CD issue of the album as bonus tracks. Same track list on the 1997 remastered version.
