= Me Kommeni Tin Anasa =

Greatest hits album by Sakis Rouvas
- Released: 5 October 1999
- Recorded: 1991–1997
- Genre: Pop-rock, pop, rock, dance, blues
- Label: Universal Music Greece, Mercury
- Producer: Nikos Terzis, Alexis Papadimitriou, Nikos Karvelas

Sakis Rouvas chronology
Kati Apo Mena (1998)	Me Kommeni Tin Anasa (1999)	21os Akatallilos (2000)

Me Kommeni Tin Anasa (Greek: Με Κομμένη Την Ανάσα; English: Breathless) is the first compilation album by the Greek singer-songwriter Sakis Rouvas, released on 5 October 1999 by Universal Music Greece. It features 16 of his biggest hit singles as well as a bonus CD single with four remixes and an English track called "Oh Girl". The album received a platinum certification.

== Track listing ==
CD 1

1. "Yia Sena"
2. "Ase Me Na Fygo"
3. "Tora Arhizoun Ta Dyskola"
4. "Afiste Tin"
5. "Mi M'agapiseis"
6. "Aima, Dakrya & Idrotas"
7. "Xana"
8. "Ela Mou"
9. "Kane Me"
10. "Tha S'ekdikitho"
11. "Min Andistekese"
12. "Me Kommeni Tin Anasa"
13. "Gyrna"
14. "Yia Fantasou"
15. "Par'ta"
16. "Yia Sena"

CD 2

1. "Afiste Tin" (Extended Mix 12")
2. "Tora Arhizoun Ta Dyskola" (Latin Dance Mix 7")
3. "Pou ke Pote (7" Remix)
4. "Xana" (Reggae Mix)
5. "Oh Girl"
