= Call Me (Anna Vissi song) =

Single by Anna Vissi

from the album Nylon
- Released: October 2004
- Recorded: Bi Kay Studios
- Genre: Pop, Dance
- Length: 4:22 (Original Version)
- Label: Vanilla/Moda Records, Sony BMG Greece/Columbia (Greece & Cyprus)
- Songwriter: Nikos Karvelas
- Producer: Nikos Karvelas

Anna Vissi singles chronology
"Remixes 2004" (2004)	"Call Me" (2004)	"Everything" (2006)

Alternative covers
- Remixes cover

"Call Me" is a song by Greek Cypriot singer Anna Vissi, originally released in 2003 in Greek as "Ise" (You Are). Written by Nikos Karvelas, "Call Me" was released in October 2004 as a promo track for radio stations in the U.S. and DJs by Nicky Kalliongis on his record label Moda Records. It was later released in April 2005 during its Billboard success as a digital download. After its Billboard success, it was released in Greece and Cyprus as a CD single.

== Background ==
"Call Me" was originally released in Greek as "Ise" (You Are) on Vissi's 2003 album Paraksenes Eikones. After Anna Vissi flew to New York to play a few songs for Nicky Kalliongis, he suggested that they release Ise in the US with English lyrics. In late 2004, Vissi signed with Nicky Kalliongis and his record label Moda Records in New York City for the release of "Call Me". Under the guidance of Nicky Kalliongis and with him overseeing the production and remixes it reached the #1 position on the Billboard Hot Club Play Chart and #2 on the Billboard Hot Dance Airplay Chart. It was also added to popular American retailer Abercrombie & Fitch's store playlist nationwide. In February 2005, Moda Records released "Call Me" as a digital download, including the original mix and many DJ mixes. Some of the remixes available with the downloaded included remixes by DJs Valentine, Chris Cox, Friscia & Lamboy, Georgia, Lee Cabrera, Mike Cruz, Riddler, and more. Around the same time, the song also peaked at number 1 on the Billboard Dance Charts. To further promote the track, Vissi went on a mini club tour around United States and Canada.

After the success on the Billboard charts, Sony BMG Greece released it as a CD single in Greece and Cyprus in June 2005. The CD single also included a new English song called "Lie". The single peaked at number 1 on the Greek singles chart, and was certified Gold status in Greece.

== Music video ==
The music video was directed by Manolis Tzirakis. Among the young men that act in the video is Kostas Martakis, who would go on to participate in Dream Show the following year and become a singer.

== Track listing ==
1. "Call Me" (Original Version)
2. "Lie" (Radio Mix)
3. "Call Me" (Chris Cox Mix)
4. "Call Me" (Lee Cabrera Mix)

== “Call Me” Remixes ==
Below all the Official remixes of "Call Me".

1. Chris Cox Club Anthem
2. Chris Cox Radio
3. Massive Cox Dub
4. Lee Cabrera
5. Lee Cabrera Dub (included on 12 inch only)
6. Mike Cruz Tribal
7. Mike Cruz Mixshow
8. Valentin Mixshow
9. Valentin Radio
10. Friscia & Lamboy Extended
11. Friscia & Lamboy Radio
12. Friscia & Lamboy Mixshow
13. Riddler Radio
14. Riddler Mixshow
15. Georgie Filtered Anthem

== Release history ==
Region	Date	Label	Format
United States	October 2004	Moda Records	Mainstream radio
United States	February 1, 2005	Moda Records	Digital download
Greece	June 2005	Sony BMG/Columbia	CD single, Digital download
Cyprus	June 2005	Sony BMG/Columbia	CD single, Digital download

== Chart performance ==
Chart	Peak position	Certification
Greek Singles Chart	1	Gold
US Billboard Hot Dance Club Play Chart	1	-
US Billboard Hot Dance Airplay Chart	2	-
