= Adio Heimona =

Adio Heimona Αντίο Χειμώνα

Studio album by Nikos Karvelas
- Released: February 2009
- Genres: Pop rock, soft rock
- Length: 41:02
- Language: Greek
- Label: Legend
- Producer: Nikos Karvelas

Nikos Karvelas chronology
Trakter (2007)	Adio Heimona; Αντίο Χειμώνα (2009)

Singles from Adio Heimona
- 1. "Louki" Released: 2009; 2. "Adio Heimona" Released: 2009

Adio Heimona (Greek: Αντίο Χειμώνα; English: Goodbye winter) is the 19th studio album by Greek singer-songwriter and record producer Nikos Karvelas, released by Legend Recordings in February 2009.

== Track listing ==
No.	Title	Lyrics	Music	Length
1.	"Adio Heimona" (Goodbye winter)	Nikos Karvelas	Nikos Karvelas	4:12
2.	"Vampir" (Vampire)	Nikos Karvelas	Nikos Karvelas	4:03
3.	"Louki"	Nikos Karvelas	Nikos Karvelas	4:25
4.	"Ola Gia Ola" (Everything for everything)	Nikos Karvelas	Nikos Karvelas	3:30
5.	"Iliotherapeia" (Sunbathing)	Nikos Karvelas	Nikos Karvelas	3:54
6.	"Sosivio" (Life jacket)	Nikos Karvelas	Nikos Karvelas	4:11
7.	"Ble" (Blue)	Nikos Karvelas	Nikos Karvelas	3:51
8.	"Maniokatathlipsi" (Manic depression)	Nikos Karvelas	Nikos Karvelas	4:12
9.	"Grammes" (Lines)	Nikos Karvelas	Nikos Karvelas	4:21
10.	"I Zoi Ine Oraia" (Life is beautiful)	Nikos Karvelas	Nikos Karvelas	3:01
11.	"Gia Proti Fora" (For the first time)	Nikos Karvelas	Nikos Karvelas	2:42
