= 25 Ores =

25 Ores 25 'Ωρες

Studio album by Nikos Karvelas
- Released: July 28, 1995
- Recorded: 1995
- Genres: Contemporary laïka, pop
- Length: 41:23
- Language: Greek
- Label: Sony Music Greece/Columbia
- Producer: Nikos Karvelas

Nikos Karvelas chronology
Ikto!: 20 Megales Epitihies Tou (1992)	25 Ores; 25 'Ωρες (1995)	To Aroma Tis Amartias (1996)

Singles from 25 Ores
- 1. "Metra (feat. Anna Vissi)" Released: 1996; 2. "25 Ores" Released: 1996

25 Ores (Greek: 25 Ώρες, lit. '25 Hours') is the 11th studio album by Greek singer-songwriter and record producer Nikos Karvelas, released by Sony Music Greece in July 1995. The album was certified gold with 30,000 copies sold.

== Track listing ==
No.	Title	Lyrics	Music	Length
1.	"Se Parakalo" (I beg you)	Nikos Karvelas	Nikos Karvelas	3:40
2.	"25 Ores" (25 hours)	Nikos Karvelas	Nikos Karvelas	4:24
3.	"Metra (feat. Anna Vissi)" (Count)	Nikos Karvelas	Nikos Karvelas	5:20
4.	"To Halaki" (The mat)	Nikos Karvelas	Nikos Karvelas	4:51
5.	"Ragise O Kathreftis" (The mirror shattered)	Nikos Karvelas	Nikos Karvelas	3:44
6.	"Panikos!" (Panic!)	Nikos Karvelas	Nikos Karvelas	4:09
7.	"Xehoriseis" (You distinguish from the rest)	Nikos Karvelas	Nikos Karvelas	5:19
8.	"Petrelaio" (Petroleum)	Nikos Karvelas	Nikos Karvelas	3:33
9.	"Den M'agapouses" (You did not love me)	Nikos Karvelas	Nikos Karvelas	3:51
10.	"Sou Afierono Tin Zoi Mou" (I dedicate my life to you)	Nikos Karvelas	Nikos Karvelas	4:32
