= Nylon (album) =

Studio album by Anna Vissi
- Released: 28 September 2005
- Recorded: 2005–2006
- Genre: Pop, dance, modern laïka, rock, rap
- Length: 74:20
- Label: Sony BMG Greece/Columbia
- Producer: Nikos Karvelas

Anna Vissi chronology
Live (2004)	Nylon (2005)	Apagorevmeno (2008)

Singles from Nylon
- 1. "Call Me"; 2. "Lie"; 3. "Nylon"; 4. "Gia Teleftea Fora"; 5. "Kinoumeni Ammos"; 6. "Erota E Polemo"; 7. "Everything"

Alternative cover
- Nylon: Euro Edition

Nylon is a Greek album by singer Anna Vissi, released in Greece and Cyprus on September 28, 2005, and subsequently in select European countries and Taiwan. The album was released as a DualDisc on October 10, 2005, the first of its kind in Greece, and re-released on May 2, 2006, with the title Nylon: Euro-Edition as a tie-in to Vissi's participation in the Eurovision Song Contest 2006. The album reached Platinum status in less than 24 hours after its release.

== Album information ==
Released in September 2005, Nylon was Anna Vissi's first studio album since the commercially successful 2003 Paraksenes Eikones. Vissi characterized Nylon as her best album so far, with Nikos Karvelas paying a lot of attention to the lyrics of the songs he had written.

Upon release, Nylon went platinum within 24 hours in Greece. In October 2005, the album was released on the DualDisc format, the first ever in Greece, with the title Nylon: DualDisc. The DualDisc version featured bonus songs and as well as special footage from the recording studio.

With Anna Vissi participation for Greece in the Eurovision Song Contest 2006, the album was once again re-released in May 2006 as Nylon: Euro-Edition with six additional English language songs, including the songs which were amongst her Eurovision entrant options for the Greek national final. The album was later released in Turkey in 2006. In 2007 the Euro-Edition was released in Germany, Austria, Switzerland, and Taiwan.

In 2019, the album was selected for inclusion in the Panik Gold box set The Legendary Recordings 1982-2019. The release came after Panik's acquisition rights of Vissi's back catalogue from her previous record company Sony Music Greece. This box set was printed on a limited edition of 500 copies containing CD releases of all of her albums from 1982 to 2019 plus unreleased material. For this purpose, it was repackaged as a 2-CD set including the original tracklist on the first CD and the Euro Edition tracks on the second.

== Track listing ==
=== Original release ===
1. "Nylon"
2. "Logia kai Siopes" (Words and silences)
3. "Kanenas" (No one)
4. "Erota I Polemo" (with Goin' Through) (Love or war)
5. "Gia Teleftea Fora" (For the last time)
6. "Erota Mou Apiste" (My unfaithful love)
7. "Kinoummeni Ammos" (Quicksand)
8. "Gia Sena Tha Pethano" (I will die for you)
9. "Mi Me Lipithis" (Don't feel sorry for me)
10. "Agapi Einai" (Love is)
11. "Dystihima" (Crash)
12. "Venetia" (Venice)
13. "Ta Kalytera Mas Hronia" (Our best years)
14. "Eho Tosi Agapi" (I have so much love)
15. "Telia" (Period [Full stop])
16. "Lie" (A. Papacostantinou Club Edit)

=== DualDisc ===
==== DualDisc 1 ====
Audio side

1. "Nylon"
2. "Logia kai Siopes"
3. "Kanenas"
4. "Erota I Polemo" (with Goin´Through)
5. "Gia Teleftea Fora"
6. "Erota Mou Apiste"
7. "Kinoummeni Ammos"
8. "Agapi Einai"
9. "Dystihima"
10. "Venetia"

DVD side

1. The 10 tracks from the CD side in Stereo PCM & Surround 5.1
2. "In Studio Part One"
  1. "Gia Sena Tha Pethano"
  2. "Nylon"
  3. "Erota Mou Apiste"

==== DualDisc 2 ====
Audio side

1. "Gia Sena Tha Pethano"
2. "Mi Me Lipithis"
3. "Telia"
4. "Ta Kalytera Mas Hronia"
5. "Eho Tosi Agapi"
6. "Lie" (Radio Mix)
7. "Lie" (A. Papacostantinou Mix)
8. "Call Me" (Original Version)
9. "Call Me" (Valentin Radio Mix)
10. "Call Me" (Friscia & Lamboy Radio Mix)

DVD side

1. The 10 tracks from the CD side in Stereo PCM & Surround 5.1
2. "Call Me" (Music Video)
3. "Call Me" (Making Of)
4. "In Studio Part Two"
  1. "Erota I Polemo"
  2. "Gia Teleftea Fora"
  3. "Logia Kai Siopes"

=== Euro-Edition ===
==== Disc 1 ====
1. "Nylon"
2. "Logia kai Siopes"
3. "Kanenas"
4. "Erota I Polemo" (with Goin´Through)
5. "Gia Teleftea Fora"
6. "Erota Mou Apiste"
7. "Kinoummeni Ammos"
8. "Gia Sena Tha Pethano"
9. "Mi Me Lipithis"
10. "Agapi Einai"
11. "Dystihima"
12. "Venetia"
13. "Ta Kalytera Mas Hronia"
14. "Eho Tosi Agapi"
15. "Telia"
16. "Lie" (A. Papacostantinou Club Edit)

==== Disc 2 ====
1. "Everything"
2. "Welcome to the Party"
3. "Who Cares About Love"
4. "A Beautiful Night"
5. "Everything" (Remixed by Valentino & C. Siganos)
6. "Everything" (Karaoke Version)

== Singles ==
"Call Me"

"Call Me", the English version of "Eisai" (2003, from the album "Paraksenes Eikones") first appeared on Greek and Cypriot radios on spring of 2005. It was then released on the market on the Gold maxi-single "Call Me". Was later included in the dual disc edition of Nylon. The maxi-single peaked at number 1 of the official Greek singles charts. In Cyprus the maxi-single won the award for best selling single of 2005.

"Lie"

Included as a b-side on the maxi-single "Call Me". A remix of the song was included in the original edition of Nylon, and the original version of the song was included in the dual disc edition of Nylon.

"Nylon"

Prior of the release of the album came the single "Nylon". In Cyprus it debuted at number 1 of the airplay charts, but in Greece failed to make it to the top 30.

"Erota I Polemo"

"Erota I Polemo" feat Goin' Through, was the third video from the album.

"Gia Teleftea Fora"

Radio single, that achieved the biggest airplay success of the album in Greece, before the release of Everything charting at the top 20 of the Greek airplay charts.

"Kinoumeni Ammos"

A remix of the song was released by December 2005 helping it achieve significant airplay, charting at number 4 of the Cypriot charts.

"Everything"

"Everything" was the Greek entry in Eurovision Song Contest 2006 included in Nylon: Euro Edition. The song peaked at number 1 on the official Greek airplay charts. It also charted at number 1 in Cyprus. The cd-single debuted at number 1 of the official greek single charts.

== Music videos ==
- "Call Me"
- "Nylon
- "Erota I Polemo"
- "Everything"

== Music ==
=== Original release ===
All the songs were composed by Nikos Karvelas, with the exception of "Lie" being composed by Kyriakos Papadopoulos. All the lyrics are written by Nikos Karvelas with the exception of the rap segment in "Erota I Polemo" written by Nikos Vourliotis (Goin Through).

=== Euro-Edition ===
Music:

- Nikos Karvelas (tracks 1–15 on CD1 and tracks 1, 3, 5 & 6 on CD2)
- Kiriakos Papadopoulos (track 16 on CD1)
- Dimitris Kontopoulos (track 2 on CD2)
- Pygasos (track 4 on CD2)

Lyrics:

- Nikos Karvelas (all tracks on CD1 and track 3 on CD2)
- Nikos Vourliotis (rap lyrics on track 4 on CD1)
- Anna Vissi (tracks 1 & 5 on CD2)
- Dimitris S (track 2 on CD2)
- Pygasos (track 4 on CD2)

== Release history ==
Region	Date	Label	Format	Version
Greece	September 28, 2005	Sony BMG, Columbia	CD	Original release
Cyprus	September 28, 2005	Sony BMG, Columbia	CD	Original release
Greece	October 10, 2005	Sony BMG, Columbia	CD	Dual-Disc
Cyprus	October 10, 2005	Sony BMG, Columbia	CD	Dual-Disc
Greece	May 5, 2006	Sony BMG, Columbia	CD	Euro-Edition
Cyprus	May 5, 2006	Sony BMG, Columbia	CD	Euro-Edition
Turkey	2006	Sony BMG, Columbia	CD	Euro-Edition
Austria	2007	Sony BMG, Columbia	CD	Euro-Edition
Germany	2007	Sony BMG, Columbia	CD	Euro-Edition
Switzerland	2007	Sony BMG, Columbia	CD	Euro-Edition
Taiwan	2007	Sony BMG, Columbia	CD	Euro-Edition

== Charts ==
Nylon peaked at number 1 since its first week of release. The album was certified Platinum in Greece within 24 hours of its release.

Chart	Providers	Peak Position	Certification
Greek Albums Chart	IFPI	1	2xPlatinum
Cypriot Albums Chart	All Records Top 20	1	2xPlatinum
