= Diavolaki =

Diavolaki Διαβολάκι

Studio album by Nikos Karvelas
- Released: March 14, 1990
- Recorded: 1990
- Genre: Pop, rock 'n' roll, dance
- Length: 34:57
- Language: Greek
- Label: CBS Greece
- Producer: Nikos Karvelas

Nikos Karvelas chronology
Tsouzi (1989)	Diavolaki; Διαβολάκι (1990)	O Teleftaios Horos (1990)

Singles from Diavolaki
- 1. "Andistrofi Metrisi (feat. Anna Vissi)" Released: 1990; 2. "Diavolaki" Released: 1990; 3. "Kathe Fora Pou Se Pligono" Released: 1990; 4. "Sta 79" Released: 1990

Diavolaki (Greek: Διαβολάκι; English: Little devil) is the eighth studio album by Greek singer-songwriter and record producer Nikos Karvelas, released by CBS Records Greece in March 1990. The album was certified gold in Greece.

== Track listing ==
No.	Title	Lyrics	Music	Length
1.	"Diavolaki" (Little devil)	Nikos Karvelas	Nikos Karvelas	3:59
2.	"Andistrofi Metrisi (feat. Anna Vissi)" (Countdown)	Nikos Karvelas	Nikos Karvelas	3:37
3.	"Kathe Fora Pou Se Pligono" (Every time I hurt you)	Nikos Karvelas	Nikos Karvelas	4:07
4.	"Apisties" (Unfaithfulness)	Nikos Karvelas	Nikos Karvelas	3:56
5.	"Ime Nekros" (I am dead)	Nikos Karvelas	Nikos Karvelas	3:35
6.	"Strip-Tiz" (Striptease)	Nikos Karvelas	Nikos Karvelas	4:21
7.	"I Fili Tis Ginekas Mou" (My wife's friend)	Nikos Karvelas	Nikos Karvelas	3:49
8.	"Ti Nihta" (At night)	Nikos Karvelas	Nikos Karvelas	4:24
9.	"Allages" (Changes)	Nikos Karvelas	Nikos Karvelas	2:47
10.	"Sta 79" (At 79)	Nikos Karvelas	Nikos Karvelas	2:22
