= Discbox slider =

Optical disc packaging concept

The discbox slider (DBS) is a 100% paperboard optical disc package developed by Stora Enso.

The case is comparable with the plastic jewel or Amaray case when it comes to size, but has more of the features of the LP style cases in terms of weight and printability. The DBS case opens up from the side by moving the slider part (on which the disc is resting) from the sleeve. The Discbox Slider is also considered as an environmentally friendly prerecorded media packaging option as it is 100% recyclable and manufactured using sustainable processes.

The Discbox slider has two packaging formats: the small-sized DBS CD for CD-sized packaging, and the DBS DVD for DVD-sized packaging (a DVD case which is available both in normal and slim size). The DBS CD case can hold 1–2 discs and a booklet, whereas the DBS DVD cases can hold 1–3 discs and booklet. The DVD-sized case is increasingly being adopted for Blu-ray releases. The Discbox Slider (DBS) packaging is currently being used by record labels and movie studios worldwide.

== Uses ==
Many covermount CDs released in British magazine Mixmag were packaged in discbox sliders. This format replaced the standard jewel case which in turn was replaced by a simple cardboard sleeve. DBSes were also used by General Motors to package instructional CDs included with their vehicles in the 2000s.
