= To Aroma Tis Amartias =

To Aroma Tis Amartias Το Άρωμα της Αμαρτίας

Studio album by Nikos Karvelas
- Released: May 10, 1996
- Recorded: 1996
- Genre: Contemporary laïka
- Length: 36:57
- Language: Greek
- Label: Sony Music Greece/Columbia
- Producer: Nikos Karvelas

Nikos Karvelas chronology
25 Ores (1995)	To Aroma Tis Amartias; Το Άρωμα της Αμαρτίας (1996)	O Pio Eftihismenos Anthropos Pano Sti Gi (1997)

Singles from To Aroma Tis Amartias
- 1. "Vre Kouto (feat. Anna Vissi)" Released: 1996; 2. "To Aroma Tis Amartias" Released: 1996; 3. "To Krevvati" Released: 1996

To Aroma Tis Amartias (Greek: Το Άρωμα της Αμαρτίας; English: The scent of sin) is the 12th studio album by Greek singer-songwriter and record producer Nikos Karvelas, released by Sony Music Greece in May 1996. The album was certified platinum with sales of 40,000 copies.

== Track listing ==
No.	Title	Lyrics	Music	Length
1.	"Se Skeftome" (I am thinking of you)	Nikos Karvelas	Nikos Karvelas	3:55
2.	"Ola Ise" (You are everything)	Nikos Karvelas	Nikos Karvelas	3:28
3.	"Tipota Horis Esena" (Nothing without you)	Nikos Karvelas	Nikos Karvelas	4:28
4.	"Vre Kouto (feat. Anna Vissi)" (Hey silly)	Nikos Karvelas	Nikos Karvelas	3:49
5.	"To Aroma Tis Amartias" (The scent of sin)	Nikos Karvelas	Nikos Karvelas	3:56
6.	"To Krevvati" (The bed)	Nikos Karvelas	Nikos Karvelas	3:33
7.	"Lipisou Me (Ela Ela)" (Feel sorry for me (Come come))	Nikos Karvelas	Nikos Karvelas	3:56
8.	"Kaigome" (I am burning)	Nikos Karvelas	Nikos Karvelas	4:36
9.	"Ki Esy Tha Me Theleis" (And even you will want me)	Nikos Karvelas	Nikos Karvelas	3:24
10.	"Zoologikos Kipos" (Zoo)	Nikos Karvelas	Nikos Karvelas	3:33
11.	"Epilogos" (Selection)	Nikos Karvelas	Nikos Karvelas	0:59
