= To Parelthon Mou =

Single by Anna Vissi

from the album Bank Bang and Apagorevmeno
- Released: October 29, 2008
- Recorded: 2008
- Genre: Pop rock
- Length: 3:33
- Label: Sony BMG
- Songwriter(s): Giannis Kifonidis, Giorgos Mitsigkas

Anna Vissi singles chronology
"Everything" (2006)	"To Parelthon Mou" (2008)	"Apagorevmeno" (2008)

"To Parelthon Mou" (My Past) is a song by Anna Vissi, and the main theme song from the Greek film Bank Bang. "To Parelthon Mou", Vissi's first new song since 2006, was released at the end of October 2008 to radios and as a digital download. It was released in November on the official soundtrack. It is included as a bonus song on Vissi's 2008 album Apagorevmeno.

== Song information ==
"To Parelthon Mou", was officially released on October 29, 2008, simultaneously to all radio stations in Greece and Cyprus along with its music video to MAD TV. Composed by Giannis Kifonidis, with lyrics by Giorgos Mitsigkas, "To Parelthon Mou" is the theme song to a Greek film Bank Bang which was released in December. The song was released as a digital download on October 29, 2008, while the soundtrack for the film was released in mid-November. The song is also included as a bonus track on Vissi's album Apagorevmeno.

== Music video ==
The music video for the song was filmed on October 22, 2008, at the Mall Athens, and features scenes from the movie, while cutting away to Vissi.

== Charts ==
The song reached number one on the official Greek Singles Chart by Billboard in its first week of release. It remained in the Top 10 for 7 consecutive weeks.

Chart	Peak position
Greek Digital Downloads Chart	1
Greek Airplay Charts (Music Control)	8
