= Apagorevmeno (song) =

Single by Anna Vissi

from the album Apagorevmeno
- Released: November 26, 2008
- Recorded: 2008
- Genre: Rock
- Length: 4:20
- Label: Sony BMG Greece/Columbia
- Songwriters: Patrick Leonard, Kara DioGuardi, Eleana Vrahali
- Producer: Patrick Leonard

Anna Vissi minor singles chronology
"To Parelthon Mou" (2008)	"Apagorevmeno" (2008)	"Stin Pira" (2009)

"Apagorevmeno" (Forbidden) is the lead single from Greek singer Anna Vissi's 2008 album Apagorevmeno. It is composed by Patrick Leonard and Kara DioGuardi, with lyrics by Eleana Vrahali. It was released on November 26, 2008 to radio stations, as well as debuting on the online music store of main sponsor Cosmote. The song was used by Cosmote in their advertising campaigns, including a television advertisement with Vissi.

== Music video ==
The music video premiered on Vissi's official website on December 14, 2008. It received a nomination for best direction at the MAD Video Music Awards.

== Charts ==
The single debuted at number four on the Greek Singles Chart by Billboard. It peaked at number one on Christmas week and remained atop for two weeks in total.

Chart	Peak position
Greek Digital Downloads Chart	1
