= Empnefsi! =

Empnefsi

Studio album by Anna Vissi
- Released: 9 December 1988
- Recorded: 1988
- Label: CBS Greece

Anna Vissi chronology
Tora (1988)	Empnefsi (1988)	Fotia (1989)

Singles from Empnefsi
- 1. "Empnefsi" Released: 1988; 2. "Houla-Houp" Released: 1989; 3. "Efimerides" Released: 1989

Empnefsi! (Greek: Έμπνευση!; English: Inspiration!) is the name of a Greek album by singer Anna Vissi. It was released in Greece and Cyprus in December 1988 by CBS Greece. It featured ten pop songs, written by her then-husband Nikos Karvelas.

== Background and release ==
The lead single Empnefsi ("Inspiration") was met with success, rising to the top of the charts. The song is considered a Greek 80s pop standard. Tracks Houla Houp ("Hula hoop") and Efimerides ("Newspapers") were also aired in the Greek media.

The album met with commercial success, selling approximately 50,000 copies and reached Gold status.

It was released on CD in early 1989. In the same year, the vinyl LP was released in Spain under the Epic label. In 1997, the CD was re-released for the Greek market as a part of the OK! Budget Price series Sony Music Greece launched at the time.

In 2019, the album was selected for inclusion in the Panik Gold box set The Legendary Recordings 1982-2019. The release came after Panik's acquisition rights of Vissi's back catalogue from her previous record company Sony Music Greece. This box set was printed on a limited edition of 500 copies containing CD releases of all of her albums from 1982 to 2019 plus unreleased material.

== Track listing ==
All music and lyrics by Nikos Karvelas.

1. "Empnefsi" (Inspiration)
2. "Amore" (Amore)
3. "San Dolofonos Maniakos" (Like a maniac killer)
4. "Londino" (London)
5. "Den Thelo Na Se Vlepo Sihna" (I don't want to see you frequently)
6. "Ohi" (No)
7. "Efimerides" (Newspapers)
8. "Houla - Houp" (Hula hoop)
9. "Oi 9 Stous 10 Horizoune" (9 out of 10 break up)
10. "San Mpalaki Tou Tennis" (Like a tennis ball)

== Credits and personnel ==
Credits adapted from the album's liner notes

Personnel

- Stelios Goulielmos - backing vocals
- Nikos Karvelas - music, lyrics
- Tony Kontaxakis - guitars
- Yiannis Piliouris - backing vocals
- Eva Tselidou - backing vocals
- Anna Vissi - vocals
- Lia Vissi - backing vocals

Production

- Nikos Karvelas - production management, arrangements, instrumentation, instrument playing
- Remy Goux - recording engineering at Studio IN
- Studio Sierra - sound remixing

Design

- Dinos Diamantopoulos - photos
- Thanos Spiropoulos - cover design
- Michalis Orfanos - cover printing
