= Anna Vissi Live =

Live

Live album by Anna Vissi
- Released: 2004
- Labels: Sony Music, Columbia

Anna Vissi chronology
| Paraksenes Eikones (2004) | Live (2004) | Nylon (2005) |

Live

Video by Anna Vissi
- Released: 2005
- Recorded: 2004
- Label: Sony Music Greece/Columbia
- Director: Giorgos Gavalos

Anna Vissi chronology
| The Video Collection (2001) | Live (2005) | Nylon (2005) |

Live is the name of a live album by Greek singer Anna Vissi, released in 2004 in Greece and Cyprus. It is her second live album and it has gone Platinum. It was also released as a live music DVD.

In 2019, the album was selected for inclusion in the Panik Gold box set The Legendary Recordings 1982-2019. The release came after Panik's acquisition rights of Vissi's back catalogue from her previous record company Sony Music Greece. This box set was printed on a limited edition of 500 copies containing CD releases of all of her albums from 1982 to 2019 plus unreleased material.

== Background Information ==
All tracks of the album were recorded during Vissi's appearances in Diogenis Studio club, Athens, premiering on December 18, 2003. Featured artists were Nino, Constantinos Christophorou and Hi-5, though their own gigs were not included in the recording.

The release of the album followed a dispute between Angela Dimitriou and music composer Manos Koufianakis with Vissi's label over the inclusion of the live cover of the formers' hit song Pia Thysia in the CD's tracklist. Later print runs omitted the track, sporting an informational sticker on the front of the jewel case. In the Panik Records' re-release, the initial tracklist, including Pia Thysia, is restored.

== Music ==
Music and lyrics are by Nikos Karvelas, Soffi Pappa, Christodoulos Siganos, Natalia Germanou, Energee, Ilias Fillipou, Spyros Zagoreos, Dimitris Gkoutis, T. Delias, A. Repanis, H. Petraki, Phoebus, A. Papacostantinou, G. Metsingas, V. Tsimpouli, A. Kaldaras, Sp. Skordilis, E. Ntaina, V. Atraidis, G. Vassilopoulos, Chr. Nikolopoulos, T. Delias, V. Kelaidis, N. Vaksevanelis, G. Spanos, K. Kindinis, M. Plessas, Pythagoras, N. Petridis, S. Tiliakou, H. Kaloudis, M. Koufianakis, G. Manisalis, K. Psyhogios, S. Kapiris, M. Hristopoulos, T. Ikonimou, Sp. Papavasiliou, I. Lymperopoulos, G. Mpithikotsis, S. Maneta, Ferro G. Rafael, Iglesias De La Cueve Julio, F. Nikolaou, D. Iatropoulos, N. Leonardos, A. Vissi, M. Mikelis

== Track listing ==
=== Disc 1 ===
1. "To Treno" (Train)
2. "Eisai" (You are)
3. "Psihedelia" (Psychedelia)
4. "Vaterlo" (Waterloo)
5. "Ola Ta Lefta" (All the money)
6. "Sigharitiria" (Congratulations)
7. "Me Mia Signomi" (With an apology)
8. "Fevgo" (I'm leaving)
9. "Den Me Agapas" (You don't love me)
10. "Kai Ti Edine" (And what happened)
11. "Ego Moro Mou" (Me, baby)
12. "Paresthisis" (Hallucinations)
13. "Paralio" (I paralyze)
14. "Eho Pethani Gia Sena" (I've died for you)
15. "Kravgi" (Scream)
16. "Agapi Ipervoliki" (Excessive love)
17. "Aftoshediasmos" (Improvisation)
18. "Travma" (Trauma)
19. "Sentonia" (Sheets)
20. "Antidoto" (Antidote)
21. "Na Se Kala" (Be well)
22. "Atmosfera Ilektrismeni" (Electrifying atmosphere)
23. "Min Psahnis Tin Agapi" (Don't look for love)

=== Disc 2 ===
1. "Vaterlo" (Waterloo)
2. "Horis To Moro Mou" (Without my baby)
3. "S' Eho Epithimisi" (I've missed you)
4. "Denome" (Attached)
5. "Prosefhi" (Prayer)
6. "Mes Tis Polis To Haman" (In the city's hammam (The harem in the hammam))
7. "Ma Ti Leo" (But what I say)
8. "Ego Moro Mou" (Me, baby)
9. "Gucci Forema" (Gucci dress)
10. "Horis Dekara" (Without a dime)
11. "Oso Aksizeis Esi" (As long as you deserve it)
12. "Tifli Empistosini" (Blind trust)
13. "Fevgo" (I'm leaving)
14. "Oti Arhizei Oreo" (Everything starts nice)
15. "Amathes Na Klapsis Klapse" (If you want to cry, cry)
16. "Se Zilevo" (I'm jealous of you)
17. "Siko Katse" (Stand up, sit down)
18. "Mes Tis Polis To Hamam" (In the city's hammam (The harem in the hammam))
19. "Ola Ta Lefta" (All the money)
20. "Ekatomiria" (Millions)
21. "O Andras Tis Zois Mou" (The man of my life)
22. "Moni Mou" (On my own)
23. "Erotevmenaki" (My little love)
24. "Kaka Pedia" (Bad guys)
25. "Mia Fora Monaha Ftani" (Just one time enough)
26. "Ti Na Thimitho Ti Na Ksehaso" (What to remember and what to forget)
27. "Tha Pio Apopse To Feggari" (I'll drink the moon tonight)
28. "Nihta Stasou" (Whoa, night)
29. "Pali Tha Klapso" (I'll cry again)
30. "Pia Thisia" (What sacrifice)
31. "Istoria Mou" (Duet with Nikos Karvelas) (My story)
32. "Pes To Ksana" (Say it again)
33. "Allimono Allimono" (Alack, alack)
34. "Kalokeria Kai Himones" (Summers and winters)
35. "An Einai I Agapi Amartia" (If love is a sin)
36. "File Mou" (My friend)
37. "Agapa Me (Abrazame)" (Love me (Hug me))
38. "Den Thelo Na Ksereis" (I don't want you to know)
39. "Gazi" (Throttle)
40. "Oso Eho Foni" (As long as I have a voice)
41. "Aftos Pou Perimeno" (Who wait)
42. "Kalimera Kainourgia Mou Agapi" (Good morning my new love)
43. "De S' Allazo" (I don't change you)
44. "Esorouha" (Underwear)
45. "San Kai Mena Kamia" (None like me)
46. "Kalokerines Diakopes Gia Panta" (Summer vacation forever (Palaio Faliro))
47. "Eisai" (You are)
48. "Methismeni Politia" (Drunk state)
49. "Dodeka" (Twelve o'clock)

== Music videos ==
- "Dodeka"/"Den Thelo Na Xeris" Medley

== Charts ==
| Chart | Providers | Peak Position | Certification |
|---|---|---|---|
| Greek Albums Chart | IFPI | 1 | Platinum |
| Cypriot Albums Chart | All Records Top 20 | 1 | Platinum |

== DVD ==
=== Video list ===
1. "To Treno"
2. "Eisai"
3. "Psihedelia"
4. "Vaterlo"
5. "Ola Ta Lefta"
6. "Sigharitiria"
7. "Me Mia Signomi"
8. "Fevgo"
9. "Den Me Agapas"
10. "Kai Ti Egine"
11. "Ego Moro Mou"
12. "Paresthisis"
13. "Paralio"
14. "Eho Pethani Gia Sena"
15. "Kravgi"
16. "Agapi Ipervoliki"
17. "Aftoshediasmos"
18. "Travma"
19. "Sentonia"
20. "Antidoto"
21. "Atmosfera Ilekrtismeni"
22. "Min Psahnis Tin Agapi"
23. "Mia Fora Monaha Ftani"
24. "Ti Na Thimitho"
25. "Tha Pio Apopse To Fegari"
26. "Nihta Stasou"
27. "Pali Tha Klapso
28. "Pia Thisia"
29. "Pes To Skana"
30. "Alimono Alimono"
31. "Kalokeria Ke Himones"
32. "An Einai I Agapi Amartia"
33. "File Mou"
34. "Agapa Me"
35. "Den Thelo Na Kseris"
36. "Gazi"
37. "Oso Eho Foni"
38. "Aftos Pou Perimeno"
39. "Kalimera Kenougia Agapi"
40. "Den S' Alazo"
41. "Esorouha"
42. "San Kai Mena Kamia"
43. "Kalokerines Diakopes"
44. "Eisai" (Unplugged)
45. "Methismeni Politia"
46. "Dodeka"

==== Extras ====
1. "Eisai" (Live at Mad Music Video Awards)
2. "Live in Cyprus"
3. "Eisai" (Video clip)
4. "Fevgo" (Video clip)
5. "Psihedelia" (Video clip)
6. "Eisai" (Video clip)

=== Personnel ===
- G. Kifonidis – keyboard
- V. Theodorakoglou – keyboard
- V. Tasopoulos – keyboard
- L. Karvelas – guitar
- Peter Young – drums
- V. Tasopoulos – saxophone
- V. Tasopoulos – percussion
- G. Ziogas – percussion
- E. Nikolidis – bouzouki
- N. Mermingas – bouzouki
- Th. Vasilopoulos – clarinet
- Mia Michaels – choreographer
- Alex Panaghi – background singer
- Viktoria Halkiti – background singer
- Stefaniou Rizou – background singer
- Giannis Kifonidis – background singer
- Velisarios Dimopoulos – music
- A. Paramithis – music
- P. Anapalis – music
- V. Kalaras – music
- N. Lisikatos – lighting
- M. Lisikatos – lighting
- Katerina Tsitsani – photography
- Manolis Hiotis – photography
- Panos Pitsilidis – art direction
- Arsenis Miaris – photo image processing
- Giannis Kifonidis (Studio Bi-Kay) – digital editing

=== Chart performance ===
| Chart | Peak position | Certification |
|---|---|---|
| Greek DVD Chart | 1 | Platinum |
| Cypriot DVD Chart | 1 | Platinum |
