= Tora (Anna Vissi album) =

Studio album by Anna Vissi
- Released: 12 February 1988
- Recorded: 1987–1988
- Label: CBS Greece
- Producer: Nikos Karvelas

Anna Vissi chronology
I Epomeni Kinisi (1988)	Tora (1988)	Empnefsi! (1988)

Singles from Tora
- 1. "1988 Ki Akoma S' Agapo"; 2. "Tora"; 3. "Ta Mathitika Hronia"; 4. "Ta Koritsia Einai Atakta"; 5. "Magiko Hali"; 6. "Den S' Allazo"

Tora (Greek: Τώρα; English: Now) is a 1988 music album by singer Anna Vissi. It was released in Greece and Cyprus by CBS Greece.

== Background and release ==
The lead single 1988 Ki Akoma S' Agapo ("1988 and I still love you") was well received by radio stations, rising to the top of the charts. The song is considered a classic Greek ballad and a pop standard. After the promotion of other top 5 singles in the Greek and Cypriot media, the song Ta Mathitika Hronia ("The school years") was released. It became a hit and remains one of Vissi's most recognizable songs from the 1980s. Another hit from the album was Ta Koritsia Einai Atakta ("Girls are mischievous"). Later that year, Vissi started a popular radio program named after that song, which lasted until 1992.

The album itself was commercially and critically well received, with sales reaching Gold status, selling approximately 50,000 copies and becoming one of the most commercial Greek albums of 1988.

It was released on CD in early 1988, along with the LP and cassette releases, though in 1992, the original album along with Vissi's 1986 album I Epomeni Kinisi were released in a joint package, as their initial CD releases had been out of print at the time. The opening track "1988 Ki Akoma S' Agapo" was omitted from the track list. In 1996, the album was re-released on CD, the artwork and track list being kept as the original.

In 2019, the album was selected for inclusion in the Panik Gold box set The Legendary Recordings 1982-2019. The release came after Panik's acquisition rights of Vissi's back catalogue from her previous record company Sony Music Greece. This box set was printed on a limited edition of 500 copies containing CD releases of all of her albums from 1982 to 2019 plus unreleased material.

In late 2025, Sony Music Greece announced a coloured vinyl limited reissue, as part of the Rainbow Collection, released for pre-order as a collector's item. A meet-and-greet, scheduled for December 12, was then attended by 150 fans, who were able to have their own copies personally signed by the artist.

== Track listing ==
Music and lyrics are by Nikos Karvelas and Anna Vissi.

1. "1988 Ki Akoma S' Agapo" (1988 and I still love you)
2. "Mono To Sex De Ftani" (Only sex is not enough)
3. "Kypseli" (Kypseli)
4. "Ta Koritsia Einai Atakta" (Girls are naughty)
5. "Magiko Hali" (Magic carpet)
6. "Ta Mathitika Hronia" (The school years)
7. "Mono Mia Nihta" (Only one night)
8. "Tora" (Now)
9. "Den S' Allazo" (I don't change you)
10. "Skandali" (Trigger)

== Credits and personnel ==
Credits adapted from the album's liner notes.

Personnel

- Stelios Goulielmos - backing vocals
- Nikos Antypas - drums
- Nikos Vardis - bass
- Aris Karantanis - saxophone
- Yiannis Piliouris - backing vocals
- Lia Piliouris - backing vocals
- Katerina Adamantidou - backing vocals
- Kostas Charitodiplomenos - keyboards, solo guitar, bass
- Nikos Karvelas - music, lyrics, piano, synthesizers, guitars, percussions, backing vocals
- Tony Kritikos - guitar
- Anna Vissi - vocals, lyrics

Production

- Nikos Karvelas - production management, arrangements, instrumentation, instrument playing
- Akis Golfidis - recording engineering, mixing at Studio SIERRA
- Manolis Olandezos - assistant recording engineer at Studio SIERRA

Design

- Dinos Diamantopoulos - photos
- Thanos Spiropoulos - cover design
- AKMI - films
- Michalis Orfanos - cover printing
