= Sa Diskos Palios =

Sa Diskos Palios Σα Δίσκος Παληός

Studio album by Nikos Karvelas
- Released: June 1986
- Recorded: 1986
- Genre: Psychedelic rock, rock 'n' roll
- Length: 36:06
- Language: Greek
- Label: CBS Greece
- Producer: Nikos Karvelas

Nikos Karvelas chronology
Den Pandrevome (1985)	Sa Diskos Palios; Σα Δίσκος Παληός (1986)	Ola I Tipota (1987)

Singles from Sa Diskos Palios
- 1. "San Diskos Palios" Released: 1986; 2. "Despina" Released: 1986; 3. "Kalokairines Diakopes Gia Panda" Released: 1986

Sa Diskos Palios (Greek: Σαν Δίσκος Παληός; English: Like an old record) is the fourth studio album by Greek singer-songwriter and record producer Nikos Karvelas, released by CBS Records Greece in June 1986 and was certified gold in Greece. In 1996, a remastered version of the album was released.

== Track listing ==
No.	Title	Lyrics	Music	Length
1.	"Despina"	Nikos Karvelas	Nikos Karvelas	3:14
2.	"Sa Diskos Palios" (Like an old record)	Nikos Karvelas	Nikos Karvelas	4:26
3.	"To Treno" (The train)	Nikos Karvelas	Nikos Karvelas	3:06
4.	"Giagia" (Grandmother)	Nikos Karvelas	Nikos Karvelas	4:21
5.	"Atherapefta" (Untreatable)	Nikos Karvelas	Nikos Karvelas	5:01
6.	"Kalokairines Diakopes Gia Panda" (Summer holidays forever)	Nikos Karvelas	Nikos Karvelas	3:30
7.	"Se Thelo" (I want you)	Nikos Karvelas	Nikos Karvelas	3:29
8.	"Fevgati" (Gone)	Nikos Karvelas	Nikos Karvelas	3:50
9.	"Opios Agapai" (What can I do)	Nikos Karvelas	Nikos Karvelas	3:16
10.	"Siga Kale" (Take it easy dear)	Nikos Karvelas	Nikos Karvelas	3:13
