= Ola I Tipota =

1987 album

Ola I Tipota Όλα Ή Τίποτα

Studio album by Nikos Karvelas
- Released: June 1987
- Recorded: 1987
- Genre: Psychedelic rock, rock 'n' roll
- Length: 29:57
- Language: Greek
- Label: CBS Greece
- Producer: Nikos Karvelas

Nikos Karvelas chronology
| Sa Diskos Palios (1985) | Ola I Tipota; Όλα Ή Τίποτα (1987) | Dimosies Scheseis (1988) |

Singles from Ola I Tipota
- 1. "Ola I Tipota" Released: Released: 1987; 2. "To Tsigaro I Ego" Released: Released: 1987; 3. "O Gieges (Sto 'Ha Pei Mamaka Ki Esena Babaka)" Released: Released: 1987; 4. "Esorouha" Released: Released: 1987; 5. "Theia Loloa" Released: Released: 1987; 6. "To Panepistimio" Released: Released: 1987

Ola I Tipota (Greek: Όλα Ή Τίποτα; English: All or nothing) is the fifth studio album by Greek singer-songwriter and record producer Nikos Karvelas, released by CBS Records Greece in June 1987. The album was certified platinum with sales of 100,000 copies. In 1996, a remastered version of the album was released.

== Track listing ==
| No. | Title | Lyrics | Music | Length |
|---|---|---|---|---|
| 1. | "Ola I Tipota" (All or nothing) | Nikos Karvelas | Nikos Karvelas | 3:13 |
| 2. | "Treles Paidikes" (Crazy Childhood) | Nikos Karvelas | Nikos Karvelas | 4:18 |
| 3. | "O Giegies (Sto 'Ha Pei Mamaka Ki Esena Babaka)" (The Yeah Yeah Man (I told you mom and dad)) | Nikos Karvelas | Nikos Karvelas | 2:53 |
| 4. | "Esorouha" (Underwear) | Nikos Karvelas | Nikos Karvelas | 2:36 |
| 5. | "Kleo Sa Moro" (I cry like a baby) | Nikos Karvelas | Nikos Karvelas | 2:27 |
| 6. | "Theia Lola" (Aunt Lola) | Nikos Karvelas | Nikos Karvelas | 3:05 |
| 7. | "To Panepistimio" (The university) | Nikos Karvelas | Nikos Karvelas | 2:55 |
| 8. | "To Tsigaro I Ego" (Cigarettes or me) | Nikos Karvelas | Nikos Karvelas | 3:41 |
| 9. | "Loxingas" (Hiccup) | Nikos Karvelas | Nikos Karvelas | 3:06 |
| 10. | "Mono Esy Ki Ego" (Only you and me) | Nikos Karvelas | Nikos Karvelas | 3:03 |
