= Stin Pira =

Single by Anna Vissi

from the album Apagorevmeno
- Released: March 9, 2009
- Recorded: 2008
- Genre: Dance, pop rock, electronic
- Length: 3:07
- Label: Sony BMG Greece/Columbia
- Songwriters: Alex Papaconstantinou, Adam Baptiste, Marcus Englof/Mirto Kontova

Anna Vissi minor singles chronology
"Apagorevmeno" (2008)	"Stin Pira" (2009)	"Alitissa Psichi" (2009)

"Stin Pira" is the second single from Greek singer Anna Vissi's 2008 album Apagorevmeno. Composed by Alex Papaconstantinou with lyrics by Myrto Kontova, the dance song had been a radio hit since the album's release. The single had a 12-week run in the Top 10 of the Greek Singles Chart published by Billboard. It debuted at number ten and peaked at number three for three non-consecutive weeks. The song is commonly referred to as Tsoules, a part of the lyrics, also the center of controversy.

The rerelease Apagorevmeno+ includes a remix of Stin Pira by the song's composer Alex Papaconstantinou.

== Controversy ==
"Stin Pira" was in the center of controversy regarding a certain word in the lyrics, "tsoules" (sluts). Many claimed that this particular lyric was offensive. The line "Boris apopse na vgis m' oles tis tsoules tis gis" (You may go out tonight with all the sluts of the Earth) won an award for the "Best Line" at the 2009 MAD Music Video Awards.

== Music video ==
A video was filmed at Athinon Arena music hall and was released on March 9, 2008, directed by Greek-American film director Christine Crokos. Vissi is accompanied by four female dancers. Patricia Field was the fashion stylist and she also appeared in the uncut version of the video, while she and Greg Ladanyi oversaw the production of the video. In the video, Vissi changes outfits seven times. The video won an award on MAD Video Music Awards for best styling. The video reached number one on MTV Greek Hit List.

== Charts ==
Stin Pira is the second single from the album Apagorevmeno by Anna Vissi released on March 9. It was picked by radio as soon as the album was released and started achieving airplay. By March it was on the playlist of many radio stations. It reached number three on the Greek Download Singles Chart published by Billboard, remaining there for a twelve weeks. It also peaked on number six of the national Greek airplay chart, and number one on the official Cypriot airplay chart for seven weeks.

Chart	Provider	Peak position
Greek Digital Downloads Chart	Billboard	3
Greek Airplay Chart	Music Control	6
