= O Teleftaios Horos =

O Teleftaios Horos Ο Τελευταίος Χορός

Studio album by Nikos Karvelas
- Released: July 5, 1991
- Recorded: 1991
- Genre: Pop rock, psychedelic rock, dance-pop
- Language: Greek
- Label: Sony Music Greece/Columbia
- Producer: Nikos Karvelas

Nikos Karvelas chronology
Diavolaki (1990)	O Teleftaios Horos; Ο Τελευταίος Χορός (1991)	Emeis (1992)

Singles from O Teleftaios Horos
- 1. "O Teleftaios Horos (feat. Anna Vissi)" Released: 1991; 2. "Sta 79 (feat. Anna Vissi)" Released: 1991; 3. "Mou Lipeis" Released: 1991

O Teleftaios Horos (Greek: Ο Τελευταίος Χορός; English: The last dance) is the ninth studio album by Greek singer-songwriter and record producer Nikos Karvelas, released by Sony Music Greece in May 1991.

== Track listing ==
All tracks are written by Nikos Karvelas

No.	Title	Length
1.	"O Teleftaios Horos (feat. Anna Vissi)" (The last dance)	5:51
2.	"Paei Gia Tsai" (She is going for tea)	3:08
3.	"Mou Lipeis" (I miss you)	3:34
4.	"Kati Pou Den Tha Teleionoume Pote" (Something that we will never finish)	3:11
5.	"Ding-Dong"	2:25
6.	"Vromiko Motel" (Dirty motel)	3:51
7.	"Aorati Klosti" (Invisible String)	3:37
8.	"Kakia Sinithia" (Bad habit)	2:33
9.	"Den S'agapo" (I do not love you)	4:12
10.	"Sta 79 (feat. Anna Vissi)" (At 79)	2:30
