= Nick Carr (album) =

Studio album by Nick Carr
- Released: 1985
- Recorded: 1985
- Genre: Disco, dance-pop
- Length: 36:09
- Language: English
- Label: Independent
- Producer: Nick Carr

Nick Carr chronology
Mia Hara, Mia Kaïmos (1975)	Nick Carr (1985)	Sa Diskos Palios (1985)

Nick Carr is the debut album by Greek singer-songwriter and record producer Nikos Karvelas under the stage name of Nick Carr, released independently in 1985.

== Track listing ==
No.	Title	Lyrics	Music	Length
1.	"Disco GRanny"	Nick Carr	Nick Carr	3:59
2.	"Himalaya"	Nick Carr	Nick Carr	5:28
3.	"Lovers"	Nick Carr	Nick Carr	4:43
4.	"Mambo"	Nick Carr	Nick Carr	3:50
5.	"Jane"	Nick Carr	Nick Carr	5:14
6.	"Swahili"	Nick Carr	Nick Carr	5:10
7.	"Why Why feat. Anna Vissi"	Nick Carr	Nick Carr	4:38
8.	"Mechanical"	Nick Carr	Nick Carr	4:27
