= Paraksenes Eikones =

Studio album by Anna Vissi
- Released: December 5, 2003
- Genre: Pop, Modern Laïka, dance
- Label: Sony Music Greece/Columbia

Anna Vissi chronology
X (2002)	Paraksenes Eikones (2003)	Live (2004)

Singles from Paraksenes Eikones
- 1. "Min Psahnis Tin Agapi"; 2. "Treno"; 3. "Eisai"; 4. "Erimi Poli"; 5. "Psichedelia"; 6. "Eho Pethani Gia Sena"; 7. "Fevgo"

Alternative covers
- Paraksenes Eikones: Summer 2004 Edition

Paraksenes Eikones (Greek: Παράξενες Εικόνες; English: Strange Images) is the name of a Greek album by singer Anna Vissi released in Greece and Cyprus on December 5, 2003. The album featured the song "Eisai" that later became Call Me in English and which topped the Billboard Hot Dance Club Play in 2005. The album was later officially released in Turkey and Bulgaria.

The song Treno was awarded song of the year by Arion Awards, IFPI's Greek recorded music awards. The album reached 3× Platinum in Greece and 3× Platinum in Cyprus. Treno also won the Arion Award for Best video clip, and also Song of the Year in both 2003 and 2004 in Cyprus.

== Release ==
It was re-released as Paraksenes Eikones: Summer 2004 Edition in the summer of 2004 with a bonus CD of remixes, which was also sold separately as Remixes 2004. This was Vissi's first album since the 1982's Eimai To Simera Kai Eisai To Chthes that included songs written by other composers besides Nikos Karvelas and also the first album since 1995's O! Kypros not to feature Karvelas entirely either on the composition or on the production part.

In 2019, the album was selected for inclusion in the Panik Gold box set The Legendary Recordings 1982-2019. The release came after Panik's acquisition rights of Vissi's back catalogue from her previous record company Sony Music Greece. This box set was printed on a limited edition of 500 copies containing CD releases of all of her albums from 1982 to 2019 plus unreleased material. Tracks from the 2004 repackage, though, were omitted.

== Track listing ==
=== Original release ===
==== Disc 1 ====
No.	Title	Lyrics	Music	Length
1.	"Min psahneis tin agapi" (Μην ψάχνεις την αγάπη; Don't look for love)	Nikos Karvelas	Nikos Karvelas	5:02
2.	"Eisai" (Είσαι; You are)	Nikos Karvelas	Nikos Karvelas	4:22
3.	"Ego moro mou" (Εγώ μωρό μου; I, baby)	Natalia Germanou	Alex Papakostantinou	3:51
4.	"Treno" (Τρένο; Train)	Sofi Papa	Vangelis Vasiliou	4:50
5.	"Girna" (Γύρνα; Come back)	Ilias Filippou	Energee	3:19
6.	"Paraisthiseis" (Παραισθήσεις; Hallucinations)	Ilias Filippou	Energee	3:47
7.	"San hlomo to vlepo" (Σαν χλωμό το βλέπω; I see it dimly; I doubt it)	Ilias Filippou	Energee	3:25
8.	"Eho pethanei gia sena" (Έχω πεθάνει για σένα; I have died for you)	Christodoulos Siganos	Christodoulos Siganos	3:58
9.	"Erimi poli" (Έρημη πόλη; Deserted city)	Constantinos Christoforou	Constantinos Christoforou	3:52
10.	"Xafnika" (Ξαφνικά; Suddenly)	Natalia Germanou	P. Lord & V.J Smith	4:02
11.	"Velos" (Βέλος; Arrow)	Lefteris Karvelas	Lefteris Karvelas	3:31
12.	"Paraxenes eikones" (Παράξενες εικόνες; Strange images)	Nikos Karvelas	Nikos Karvelas	3:52

==== Disc 2 ====
No.	Title	Lyrics	Music	Length
1.	"Psihedelia" (Ψυχεδέλεια; Psychedelic)	Nikos Karvelas	Nikos Karvelas	3:52
2.	"Vaterlo" (Βατερλό; Waterloo)	Nikos Karvelas	Nikos Karvelas	3:52
3.	"Me mia signomi" (Με μια συγνώμη; With one apology)	Sofi Papa	Sofi Papa	3:31
4.	"Fevgo" (Φεύγω; I'm leaving)	Nikos Karvelas	Nikos Karvelas	4:20
5.	"O andras tis zois mou" (Ο άντρας της ζωής μου; The man of my life)	Nikos Vaksevanelis	Vasilis Kelaydis	3:29
6.	"Mov" (Μωβ; Purple)	Nikos Karvelas	Nikos Karvelas	4:17
7.	"Den apofasisa ego" (Δεν αποφάσισα εγώ; It wasn't my decision)	Christina Alogogianni	Stratos Diamadis	3:05
8.	"Stirixou epano mou" (Στηρίξου επάνω μου; Lean on me)	Ilias Filippou	Energee	4:28
9.	"Arketa" (Αρκετά; Enough)	Ilias Filippou	Christos Giannopoulos	4:22
10.	"Ti apomenei" (Τι απομένει; What remains)	Ilias Filippou	Energee	3:22
11.	"Nea Filadelfia" (Νέα Φιλαδέλφεια; New Philadelphia)	Nikos Karvelas	Nikos Karvelas	3:21
12.	"Pos ta fernei etsi i zoi" (Πώς τα φέρνει έτσι η ζωή; How does life turn out like this)	Lefteris Karvelas	Lefteris Karvelas	3:50
13.	"Eisai (Prodical Son Remix)" (Είσαι (Prodical Son Remix); You are (Prodical Son Remix))	Nikos Karvelas	Nikos Karvelas	5:25

==== Summer 2004 Edition ====
Disc 1 and Disc 2 from the original edition along with a third remix CD.

===== Disc 3 =====
1. "Ego moro mou" (Elias Pantazopoulos Remix)
2. "Eho pethani gia sena" (Valentino Remix)
3. "Eisai" (Prodical Son Radio Edit)
4. "Eisai" (Remix by Elias Pantazopoulos)
5. "Fevgo" (Sonic Crime Remix)

== Music videos ==
Five songs from the album were made into music videos:

- "Treno" (Voted best ever Greek music video in April 2008 on MAD TV).
- "Eho Pethani Gia Sena"
- "Eisai"
- "Eisai" (Elias Pantazopoulos Remix)
- "Min Psahnis Tin Agapi"
- "Psichedelia"

== Singles ==
"Min Psahnis Tin Agapi"

The first promo single from the album was released to radio on October 31, 2003.

"Treno"

"Treno" was released to radio stations the day of the album's release. It peaked at number 1 of the official Greek Airplay where it remained for 13 weeks becoming the biggest single of the year. It won the award for Song Of The Year 2003 at the Arion Awards and the music video for the single won the best video award at the 2004 Arion Awards. She also received the best dressed artist in a music video award at the 2004 MAD Video Music Awards.

"Eisai"

The third promo single from the album.

"Psichedelia"

The fourth promotional single from the album.

"Eho Pethanei Gia Sena"

Released as a promo single in April 2004.

"Fevgo" (Cyprus only)

The last promotional single from the album.

== Release history ==
Region	Date	Label	Format	Version
Bulgaria	2004	Vitality Music		
Greece	December 5, 2003	Sony/Columbia	CD	Original release
Greece	June 2004	Sony/Columbia	CD	Summer 2004 Edition
Cyprus	December 5, 2003	Sony/Columbia	CD	Original release
Cyprus	June 2004	Sony/Columbia	CD	Summer 2004 Edition
Turkey	March 10, 2004	Sony/Columbia	Cassette	Original release
Turkey	March 24, 2004	Sony/Columbia	CD	Original release

== Charts ==
Paraksenes Eikones was released in Greece and Cyprus in December 2003. It became 2× Platinum in Greece in April 2004, and 3× Platinum in Cyprus in May 2004.

Chart	Providers	Peak Position	Certification
Greek Albums Chart	IFPI	1	3× Platinum
Cypriot Albums Chart	All Records Top 20	1	3× Platinum
