= The Video Collection (Anna Vissi video) =

Video by Anna Vissi
- Released: December 19, 2001
- Length: 120 Minutes
- Label: Sony Music Greece/Columbia

Anna Vissi chronology
The Video Collection (2001)	Live (2005)

Alternative cover
- Alternative cover of The Video Collection.

The Video Collection is the name of a music video DVD compilation by popular Greek singer Anna Vissi, released by Sony Music in 2001 in Greece and Australia. The DVD contains music videos from Anna Vissi's career up to that point, selected by Vissi herself.

== Music videos ==
1. "Pseftika" (False)
2. "Adistrofi Metrisi" (Countdown)
3. "Ena Sou Leo" (I tell you one thing)
4. "Fos" (Light)
5. "Sta '79" (At' 79)
6. "Demones" (Demons)
7. "Den Thelo Na Xereis" (I don't want you to know)
8. "Emeis" (Us)
9. "Akoma Mia" (Another one)
10. "Lambo" (I glow)
11. "Eleni" (Helen)
12. "Eimai Poli Kala" (I'm OK)
13. "Metra" (Count)
14. "Vre Kouto" (Stupid)
15. "Mavra Gialia" (Black Glasses)
16. "Forgive Me This"
17. "Mou Anikeis" (I own you or You're mine)
18. "Erotevmenaki" (Lovebird)
19. "S'eho Epithimisei"(I've missed you)
20. "Everything I Am"
21. "Agapi Ipervoliki" (Too much Love)
22. "Dodeka" (12) (Live At Club Asteria - Athens)
23. "Kravgi" (Scream)
24. "Horis To Moro Mou" (Without my Baby)
25. "Kravgi Hitmix"

== Personnel ==
- Management: Christy Tsolakaki
- Project Manager: Nicholas Hatzijannis
- Styling: Sofia Karvelas
- Make Up: Dimitris Dimitroulis
- Photography: Katerina Tsatsani

== Chart performance ==
Chart	Peak position	Certification
Greek DVD Chart	1	-
Australian DVD Chart	2	-
