= Nikos Karvelas =

Greek songwriter, producer and singer

Nikos Karvelas Νίκος Καρβέλας
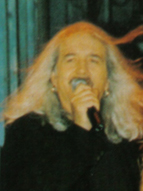

Background information
- Also known as: Nikos Leonardos
- Born: Nikolaos Karvelas; 8 September 1951 (age 75); Tampouria, Piraeus, Greece
- Genres: Laïko; pop music; rock music; dance music
- Occupations: Musician; composer; singer; songwriter; record producer; author
- Instruments: Piano; vocals; guitar
- Years active: 1974–present
- Labels: Minos EMI; Carvi Productions; Sony Music; Cobalt Music; Heaven Music; Panik Records
- Spouses: Anna Vissi (m. 1983; div. 1992) Annita Pania (m. 2010; div. 2016)
- Partner: Elena Ferentinou (as of 2020)

Nikos Karvelas (Greek: Νίκος Καρβέλας; born 8 September 1951) is a Greek musician, composer, singer, songwriter, record producer and author. He has sold millions of records as a producer and is most recognizable for his four-decade-long collaboration with Anna Vissi, while some of his other well-known collaborations include Tolis Voskopoulos and Sakis Rouvas. Karvelas has released multiple personal studio albums that have had mild to big success. In 2012, Alpha TV ranked Karvelas as the 13th top-certified composer in Greece in the phonographic era.

== Early life ==
Karvelas was born on 8 September 1951 in the Tampouria neighbourhood of Piraeus. When he was five years old, his parents bought him his first piano. He started to play popular songs and composed his first melodies. During the 1970s, he studied law at the University of Athens. Karvelas created his first rock band influenced by famous rock bands like the Beatles and the Rolling Stones. He started to become known at the end of the 1970s. In the early 1980s, Karvelas met his muse, Vissi, and a few years later, in 1983, they got married. Vissi has claimed that the first impression she had when she met Karvelas was a "hairy thing," but she was amazed by his talent and his sex appeal.

== Career ==
=== 1985–1991 ===
Karvelas' career as a singer started in 1985 when he released his first studio album under CBS Records Greece, San Diskos Palios (Like An Old Record) making two big hits, Despina and Kalokairines Diakopes (Summer Holidays). The album sold over 50,000 copies and became gold. In 1987, he released his second album Ola i Tipota (All or Nothing) and it became platinum. Next year, he released his third album, Dimosies Scheseis (Public Relations) and in 1989 he released his fourth album, "Tsouzi." His fifth step came out in 1990 and tended to be his "lucky" album. It was called Diavolaki (Little Devil) and became gold. The top hit of the album was Antistrofi Metrisi (Countdown), a duet with Vissi.

One year later, he released another gold album, titled O Teleftaios Horos (The Last Dance). The self-titled duet with Vissi confirmed the rumors about the problems of their marriage. In 1991, Karvelas and Vissi tried their luck in a different type of music. Demones (Demons) is the first opera composed by Karvelas and Vissi was the protagonist, while actors including Giannis Samsiaris and John Modinos participated. Vissi has stated "Me and Nikos would like so much to do Demones in Athens and we spent all our money to produce it without knowing if it will have success". The rock opera was a great success and for two years the theater "Attikon" was sold out.

=== 1992–1999 ===
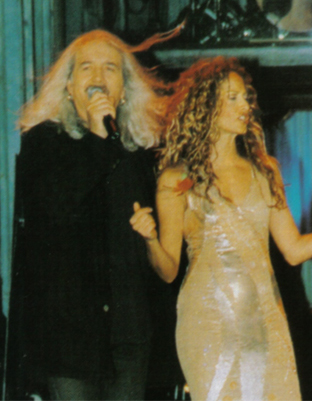
Karvelas and Anna Vissi live at "Asteria" in 1998

Emeis (We) was the next album of Karvelas, released in 1992 with the top single Emeis, another duet with Vissi. Two years later, Karvelas releases another gold album, 25 ores (25 Hours). All the albums were great successes and became either gold or platinum. In 1993, Karvelas released Best Of with 2 new songs, "Oikto" (Mercy) and "Thes Den Thes" (Whether You Want or Not). In 1996, he released the album To Aroma tis Amartias (The Aroma of Sin) and it became platinum. Next year, the title of his gold album, O Pio Eftihismenos Anthropos Pano Sti Gi (The Happiest Man On Earth), ironically expressed Karvelas' mood. This certain period, Karvelas moved to London permanently, having enough time and great inspiration to prepare his next steps. He released the album Ena Hrono to Perissotero (One Year the Most). Vissi sang with Nikos the top single of the album which was the name of the album.

=== 2000–present ===
In 2000, Karvelas from London shared his new hits with his fans in the album Ola Ine Endaxi (Everything Is Alright). However, he started to prepare his new musical Mala, dealing with the story of Mala Zimetbaum, a Jewish girl who tried to escape from Auschwitz in 1944.

In January 2002, Mala’s premiere in "Pallas" theater took place, with Vissi playing the lead role. The musical was a great success and it was sold out every night. After Mala, Karvelas released an album titled, Party Gia Spasmenes Kardies (Party for Broken Hearts). Boom Boom Boom was the first single of the album, a memorial duet with Vissi. His next album was Robot, released by Nitro Music. In 2004, he released a single dedicated to the Greek football champion team in Euro 2004.

The title was Imaste Nikites (We Are Winners). Some of the football players participated in the song's music video. In 2006, he released the album Thriller and in 2007 the single Pios Fovate ton Passari (Who's Afraid of Passaris). In late 2007, he released the album Trakter. In February 2009, Karvelas released his 19th studio album titled Adio Heimona. In a radio interview prior to the album's release, good friend Natalia Germanou, described the album as featuring a variety of styles, and classified it as "the return of good old Karvelas." In December 2009, it was announced that Karvelas would become the head judge on the Greek talent show "Greek Idol" to be aired on Alpha TV in 2010, but he eventually withdrew from the project before it started airing.

As of 2024, Karvela’s collaboration with Anna Vissi, spans over 4-decades and remains as one of the most lucrative in Greek history, having achieved multi-million record sales (in the range of 15 and 20 million).

== Personal life ==
Karvelas first met Greek-Cypriot singer Anna Vissi in early 1980s, and married in 1983. They have a daughter named Sofia (b. 1983). The couple later divorced, but have remained good friends to date, while Karvelas also has written the lyrics of most of Vissi's songs.

In 2006, Karvelas began dating Greek television hostess Annita Pania. In 2008 Pania gave birth to their son named Andreas. The couple married in 2010 and divorced in 2016.

Since 2019, Karvelas has been in a relationship with Greek singer Elena Ferentinou. They have a son named Fedon (b. 2022).

== Discography ==
=== Studio albums ===
| Year | Title | Certification |
|---|---|---|
| 1983 | Taxi | — |
| 1984 | Den Pandrevome | — |
| 1985 | Nick Carr | — |
| 1986 | Sa Diskos Palios | Gold |
| 1987 | Ola I Tipota | Platinum |
| 1988 | Dimosies Scheseis | — |
| 1989 | Tsouzi | — |
| 1990 | Diavolaki | Gold |
| 1991 | O Teleftaios Horos | — |
| 1992 | Emeis | Gold |
| 1995 | 25 Ores | Gold |
| 1996 | To Aroma Tis Amartias | Platinum |
| 1997 | O Pio Eftihismenos Anthropos Pano Sti Gi | — |
| 1998 | Ena Hrono To Perissotero | — |
| 2000 | Ola Einai Endaxi | — |
| 2002 | Robot | — |
| 2006 | Thriler | — |
| 2007 | Trakter | — |
| 2009 | Adio Heimona | — |
| 2011 | Ola Einai Mes Sto Mialo | — |
| 2015 | Mathimata Filosofias (Philosophy Lessons) | |

=== CD singles ===
| Year | Title | Notes |
|---|---|---|
| 2003 | Party Gia Spasmenes Kardies | — |
| 2004 | Eimaste Nikites | — |
| 2007 | Pios Fovate Ton Passari | — |

=== Compilations ===
| Year | Title | Notes |
|---|---|---|
| 1992 | Ikto!: 20 Megales Epitihies Tou | — |

== As a songwriter for other artists ==
- 1975: Yiannis Parios – Erhontai Stigmes – Gold
- 1976: Yiannis Parios – Tora Pia – Platinum
- 1977: Yiannis Parios – Mi Fevgis Mi – Platinum
- 1977: Litsa Diamanti – Ase Me Na S' Agapao – Gold
- 1977: Yiannis Kalatzis – Kapoios Panta Leei Antio
- 1977: Dimitris Kontolazos – Min Rotas
- 1977: Litsa Sakellariou – Litsa Sakellariou
- 1977: Tolis Voskopoulos – Einai To Kati Pou Menei – Gold
- 1978: Themis Andreadis – O Themis Pou Paei Pantou
- 1978: Dimitra Galani – M' Agapouses Thimame... – Gold
- 1979: Yiannis Kalatzis – Pali Konta Sou
- 1979: Tolis Voskopoulos – Mera Nychta Pantou – Gold
- 1981: Doukissa – Gia Sena Ksana Tragoudo
- 1981: Anna Vissi – Anna Vissi (as Nikos Leonardos) – Gold
- 1982: Anna Vissi – Eimai To Simera Kai Eisai To Hthes
- 1984: Anna Vissi – Na 'Hes Kardia – Gold
- 1985: Angela Dimitriou – Poia Thysia – Gold
- 1985: Anna Vissi – Kati Simveni – Gold
- 1986: Anna Vissi – I Epomeni Kinisi – Platinum
- 1986: Rita Sakellariou – Areso – Platinum
- 1986: Litsa Diamanti – Den Pandrevome – Gold
- 1987: Dimitris Kontolazos – Den M' Agapas – Gold
- 1987: Haroula Ntanou – Dikaiologimena
- 1987: Dimitris Kontolazos – Den M' Agapas – Gold
- 1987: Polina – Pame Gia Treles Stis Seychelles
- 1988: Anna Vissi – Tora – Gold
- 1988: Anna Vissi – Empnefsi! – Gold
- 1988: Litsa Diamanti – Piretos – Gold
- 1989: Anna Vissi – Fotia – Platinum
- 1990: Polina – Kali Epityhia
- 1990: Dimitris Kontolazos – Tachypalmia – Gold
- 1990: Anna Vissi – Eimai – Gold
- 1992: Katerina Stanisi – Anastatonomai – Gold
- 1992: Anna Vissi – Lambo – Gold
- 1993: Sofia Karvela – Kolla To
- 1993: Katerina Stanisi – Na Mineis – Gold
- 1993: Lefteris Pantazis – Ego Den Eimai Ego – Platinum
- 1993: Anna Vissi – Live!
- 1994: Sakis Rouvas – Aima, Dakrya & Idrotas – Platinum
- 1994: Lefteris Pantazis – O Paixtis – Gold
- 1994: Stathis Aggelopoulos – Kripse Me Stin Agkalia Sou
- 1994: Anna Vissi – Re! – Gold
- 1995: Margarita Pappa – Etsi Eimai Ego
- 1996: Anna Vissi – Klima Tropiko – 3× Platinum
- 1996: Sakis Rouvas – Tora Arhizoun Ta Dyskola – Platinum
- 1996: Lambis Livieratos – Bam Kai Kato – Gold
- 1997: Anna Vissi – Travma – 3× Platinum
- 1997: Efi Sarri – Adinaton – Gold
- 1997: Lefteris Pantazis – Erhetai – Gold
- 1997: Antypas – Kataigida – Gold
- 1997: Katerina Stanisi – Imoun, Eimai Kai Tha Eimai – Gold
- 1998: Lambis Livieratos – Poios Einai Aftos – Gold
- 1998: Anna Vissi – Antidoto – 3× Platinum
- 1997: Efi Sarri – Tête-à-Tête – Gold
- 1998: Dimitris Kokotas – Gia Mena – Gold
- 1999: Christina Anagnostopoulou – Ola Ki Ola
- 2000: Anna Vissi – Everything I Am – Gold
- 2000: Anna Vissi – Kravgi – 7× Platinum
- 2001: Christina Anagnostopoulou – Ke Hamogelao
- 2002: Anna Vissi – X – 2× Platinum
- 2003: Anna Vissi – Paraksenes Eikones – 2× Platinum
- 2004: Christina Anagnostopoulou – Straight
- 2004: Anna Vissi – Live – Platinum
- 2005: Anna Vissi – Nylon – Platinum
- 2007: Various artists – Je T'Aime
- 2010: Anna Vissi – Agapi Einai Esi – Gold
- 2011: Paschalis Terzis – Dio Nichtes Mono – Gold
- 2013: Vigor – Još Fališ (single)
- 2015: Anna Vissi – Sinentefksi – Gold
- 2019: Anna Vissi – Iliotropia – Gold

== See also ==
- Mala: I Mousiki Tou Anemou
