= Anna Vissi discography =

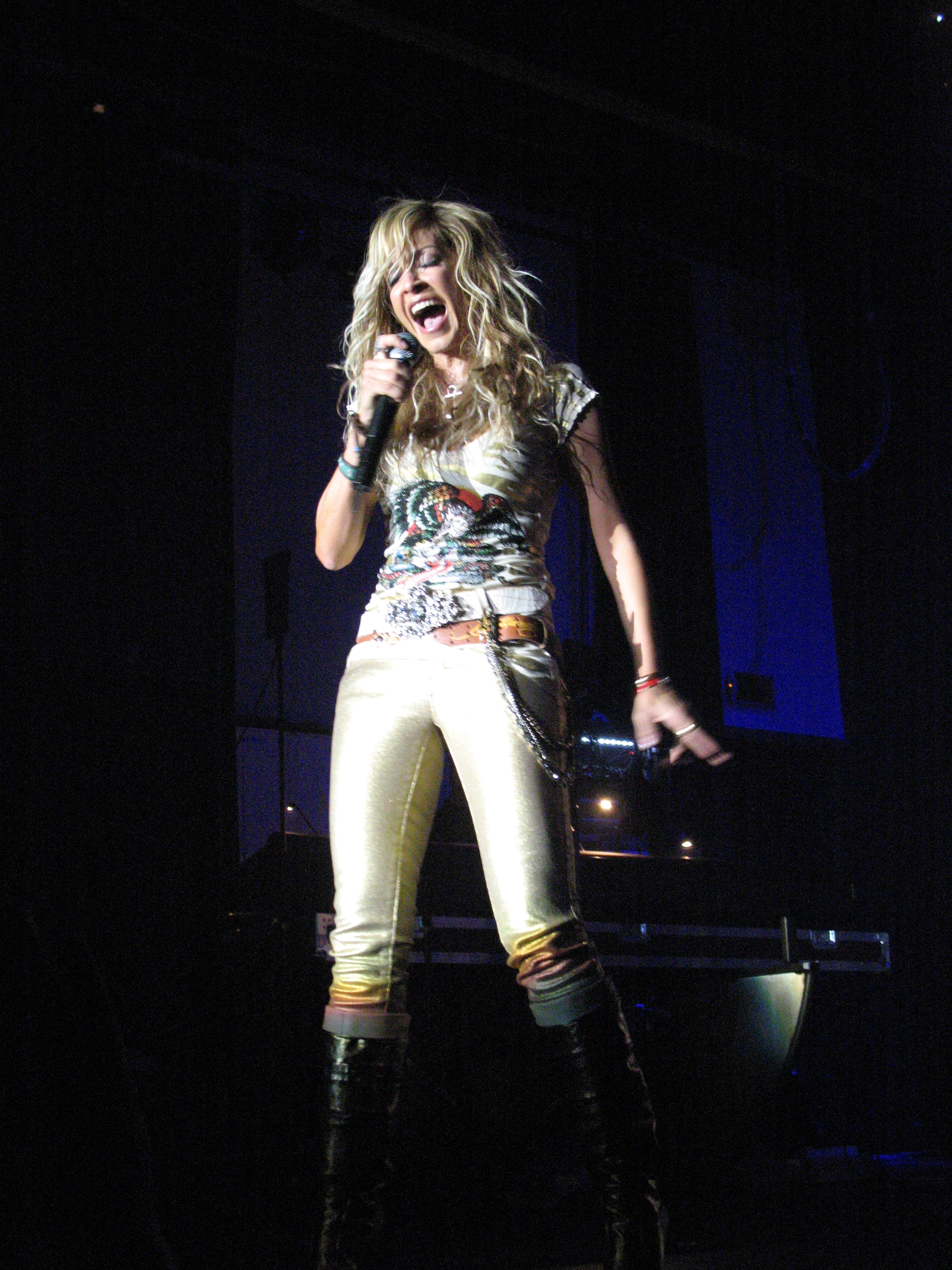
- Studio albums: 28
- Extended plays: 7
- Soundtrack albums: 4
- Live albums: 4
- Singles: 141
- Music videos: 76
- Official Compilations: 8
- Videography: 2

The following is the discography of Greek Cypriot singer Anna Vissi.

From 1995 to 2015, Vissi received 38 platinum certifications in Greece and has become one of the country's best-selling female artist. Her album Kravgi still remains the best-selling albums of the 2000s (decade), and one of the best-selling of all time, while two others Travma and Antidoto are among the best-selling. She also had some success in the United States, reaching number one on the U.S. Billboard Hot Dance Club Play Chart with "Call Me". Anna Vissi is the best-selling Greek album artist, with her albums exceeding 3 million sales.

== Albums ==
=== Studio albums ===
- * denotes unknown or unavailable information.

Year	Album details	Peak chart positions				Certifications (sales thresholds)
Year	Album details	GRE	CYP	AUS	TUR	Certifications (sales thresholds)
1977	As Kanoume Apopse Mian Arhi: Released: October 1977; Label: Minos; Formats: LP, cassette, CD	*	*	—	—	CYP: Gold
1979	Kitrino Galazio: Released: April 1979; Label: Minos; Formats: LP, cassette, CD	*	*	—	—	GR: Gold
1980	Nai: Released: December 1980; Label: Minos; Formats: LP, cassette, CD	*	*	—	—	
1981	Anna Vissi: Released: December 1981; Label: Minos; Formats: LP, cassette, CD	*	*	—	—	
1982	Eimai To Simera Kai Eisai To Chthes: Released: November 1982; Label: CarVi; Formats: LP, cassette, CD	*	*	—	—	
1984	Na 'Hes Kardia: Released: March 22, 1984; Label: CBS Greece; Formats: LP, cassette, CD	*	*	—	—	GRE: Gold
1985	Kati Simveni: Released: September 12, 1985; Label: CBS Greece; Formats: LP, cassette, CD	*	*	—	—	GRE: Gold
1986	I Epomeni Kinisi: Released: December 15, 1986; Label: CBS Greece; Formats: LP, cassette, CD	*	*	—	—	GR: Platinum
1988	Tora: Released: February 12, 1988; Label: CBS Greece; Formats: LP, cassette, CD	*	*	—	—	GR: Gold
1988	Empnefsi!: Released: December 9, 1988; Label: CBS Greece; Formats: LP, cassette, CD	*	*	—	—	GR: Gold
1989	Fotia: Released: December 12, 1989; Label: CBS Greece; Formats: LP, cassette, CD	*	*	—	—	GR: Platinum
1990	Eimai: Released: December 14, 1990; Label: CBS Greece; Formats: LP, cassette, CD	*	*	—	—	GR: Gold
1992	Emeis: Released: May 28, 1992; Label: Sony Music Greece/Columbia; Formats: LP, cassette, CD	*	*	—	—	GR: Gold
1992	Lambo: Released: December 24, 1992; Label: Sony Music Greece/Columbia; Formats: LP, cassette, CD	*	*	—	—	GR: Platinum
1994	Re!: Released: December 22, 1994; Label: Sony Music Greece/Columbia; Formats: LP, cassette, CD	1	1	—	1	GR: Gold; TUR: 2× Platinum
1995	O! Kypros: Released: July 25, 1995; Label: Sony Music Greece/Columbia; Formats: LP, cassette, CD	*	*	—	—	CYP: 3× Platinum
1996	Klima Tropiko: Released: February 29, 1996; Label: Sony Music Greece/Columbia; Formats: LP, cassette, CD	1	1	—	—	GR: 2× Platinum; CYP: 3× Platinum
1997	Travma: Released: April 16, 1997; Label: Sony Music Greece/Columbia; Formats: LP, cassette, CD	1	1	73	—	GR: 3× Platinum; CYP: 3× Platinum
1998	Antidoto: Released: April 1, 1998; Label: Sony Music Greece/Columbia; Formats: LP, CD, cassette	1	1	—	—	GR: 3× Platinum; CYP: 3× Platinum
2000	Everything I Am: Released: October 23, 2000; Label: Sony Music Greece/Columbia; Formats: CD, cassette	1	1	—	—	GR: Gold; CYP: Platinum
2000	Kravgi: Released: November 23, 2000; Label: Sony Music Greece/Columbia; Formats: LP, CD, cassette	1	1	66	1	GR: 7× Platinum; CYP: 7× Platinum; TUR: Gold
2002	X: Released: October 9, 2002; Label: Sony Music Greece/Columbia; Formats: Cassette, CD	1	1	—	—	GR: 2× Platinum; CYP: 2× Platinum; TUR: Gold
2003	Paraksenes Eikones: Released: December 5, 2003; Label: Sony Music Greece/Columbia; Formats: Cassette, CD	1	1	—	—	GR: 2× Platinum; CYP: 2× Platinum
2005	Nylon: Released: September 28, 2005; Label: Sony Music Greece/Columbia; Formats: CD, Dual Disc, cassette	1	1	—	—	GR: 2× Platinum; CYP: Platinum
2008	Apagorevmeno: Released: December 9, 2008; Label: Sony Music Greece/Columbia; Formats: CD, digital download	1	1	—	—	GRE: 2× Platinum; CYP: 4× Platinum
2010	Agapi Einai Esi: Released: December 17, 2010; Label: Sony Music Greece/Columbia; Formats: CD, digital download	3	1	—	—	GR: Gold; CYP: Platinum
2015	Sinentefxi: Released: November 30, 2015; Label: Panik Gold; Formats: CD, digital download	4	1	*	*	GRE: Platinum
2019	Iliotropia: Released: June 3, 2019; Label: Panik Gold; Formats: CD, digital download	1	1	*	*	GR: Platinum; CYP: Platinum

=== Live albums ===
- * denotes unknown or unavailable information.

Year	Album details	Peak chart positions		Certifications (sales thresholds)
Year	Album details	GRE	CYP	Certifications (sales thresholds)
1993	Live!: Released: December 17, 1993; Label: Sony Music Greece/Columbia; Formats: LP, Cassette, CD	1	1	
2004	Live: Released: December 2004; Label: Sony Music Greece/Columbia; Formats: CD	1	1	GRE: Platinum
2018	Hotel Ermou Live 2015–2018: Released: 23 July 2018; Label: Panik Gold; Formats: Digital / CD	1	1	GRE: Platinum
2024	50 Years (Live at Odeon of Herodes Atticus): Released: 4 December 2024; Label: Panik Gold; Formats: Digital			
2025	Panathenaic Stadium Live: Released: 23 December 2025; Label: Panik Gold; Formats: Digital			
"—" denotes releases that did not chart or was not released

=== Soundtracks ===
- * denotes unknown or unavailable information.

Year	Album details	Peak chart positions	
Year	Album details	GRE	CYP
1991	Daimones: Released: 1991; Label: Sony Music Greece/Columbia; Formats: LP, Cassette, CD	1	1
1993	Ode to the Gods: Released: 1993; Label: Sony Music Greece/Columbia; Formats: CD	—	4
2002	Mala - I Mousiki Tou Anemou: Released: April 26, 2002; Label: Sony Music Greece/Columbia; Formats: CD	2	1
2013	Daimones (2013 edition): Released: 2013; Label: Formats: CD + DVD	1	1
"—" denotes releases that did not chart or was not released

== Singles ==
In Greece and Cyprus, singles are usually released only as radio singles rather than physical releases. CD Maxi or EPs are not often released, and usually include either up to seven new songs, or remixes of various songs (up to seven different songs to be eligible for the single charts).

=== CD Maxi / EPs / singles (CD or digital) ===
- Cyprus official CD-single charts (which included EPs and CD-maxi's) were available from 1992 until end of 2006. Digital singles charts are available since 2010.
- Greek official CD-single charts (which included EPs and CD-maxi's) were available until February 2007. Digital singles charts are available since 2008.

Title	Format (Type)	Year	Peak chart positions									Certifications	Album
Title	Format (Type)	Year	AUS	CYP	GRE Sales charts	GRE airplay charts	EU	RUS	SWE	US Dance Club	US Dance Airplay	Certifications	Album
"Autostop"	Vinyl (single)	1980	—	N/A	N/A	—	—	—	—	—	—		Non-album single
"Mono I Agapi"	Vinyl (single)	1982	—	N/A	N/A	—	—	—	—	—	—		Anna Vissi
"Eimai Poli Kala"	CD (single)	1995	—	*	*	—	—	—	—	—	—		Re!
"Amin"	CD (single)	1995	—	*	*	—	—	—	—	—	—		Re!
"Min Ksehnas"	CD (single)	1995	—	1	—	—	—	—	—	—	—		Non-album single
"Forgive Me This"	CD (maxi)	1997	66	—	—	—	—	—	—	—	—		Everything I Am
"Oso Eho Foni/Aftos Pou Perimeno: The Remixes"	CD (single)	1997	—	*	*	—	—	—	—	—	—		Non-album single
"Agapi Ipervoliki"	CD (EP)	2000	—	1	1	—	—	—	—	—	—	CYP: 4× Platinum; GRE: 4× Platinum	Kravgi
"Everything I Am"	CD (single)	2000	—	1	1	—	—	—	—	—	—	CYP: 4× Platinum; GRE: Platinum	Everything I Am
"Still in Love with You"	CD (single)	2001	—	*	20	*	—	19	—	—	—		Everything I Am
"Mala, I Mousiki Tu Anemou"	CD (single)	2001	—	1	1	—	—	—	—	—	—	CYP: Platinum; GRE: Gold	Mala: I Mousiki Tou Anemou
"The Remixes"	CD (EP)	2003	—	1	2	—	—	—	—	—	—	CYP: Gold	X
"Remixes 2004"	CD (EP)	2004	—	1	1	—	—	—	—	—	—	CYP: Gold; GRE: Gold	Paraksenes Eikones
"Call Me"	CD (single)	2005	—	1	1	—	68	—	—	1	2	CYP: Platinum; GRE: Gold	Nylon
"Autostop/Love Is a Lonely Weekend"	CD (single)	2006	—	*	4	—	—	—	—	—	—	GRE: Gold	Non-album single
"Everything"	CD (single)	2006	—	1	1	1	—	—	26	—	—	CYP: Platinum; GRE: Gold	Nylon
"To Parelthon Mou"	Digital (single)	2008	—	N/A	1	8	—	—	—	—	—		Apagorevmeno
"Apagorevmeno"	Digital (single)	2008	—	N/A	1	—	—	—	—	—	—		Apagorevmeno
"Stin Pira"	Digital (single)	2009	—	N/A	3	6	—	—	—	—	—		Apagorevmeno
"Alitissa Psihi"	Digital (single)	2009	—	N/A	7	*	—	—	—	—	—		Apagorevmeno
"Fabulous"	Digital (single)	2009	—	N/A	4	1	—	—	—	—	—		Apagorevmeno
"Agapi Ine Esi"	Cd (maxi)	2010	—	N/A	N/A	—	—	—	—	—	—		Agapi Einai Esi
"Mono An Trellatho"	Digital (single)	2011	—	1	1	—	—	—	—	—	—		Access All Areas
"Ora Na Fevgo"	Digital (single)	2012	—	*	5	*	—	—	—	—	—		Access All Areas
"Tiraniemai"	Digital (single)	2012	—	8	7	*	—	—	—	—	—		Access All Areas
"Tiraniemai"	Cd (E.P.)	2012	—	N/A	N/A	N/A	—	—	—	—	—		Access All Areas
"I Kathimerinotita Mas"	Digital (single)	2013	—	1	2	5	—	—	—	—	—		digital singles only
"Ena I Kanena"	Digital (single)	2014	—	1	1	10	—	—	—	—	—		digital singles only
"Kaliteres Meres"	Digital (single)	2014	—	4	10	32	—	—	—	—	—		Mad Walk Show 2014 (EP)
"Mad Walk Show 2004"	Digital (EP)	2014	—	1	1	N/A	—	—	—	—	—		digital EP only
"Apolito Keno (2015 version)"	Digital (single)	2014	—	7	2	31	—	—	—	—	—		digital single only
"As Min Poume... Tipota"	Digital (single)	2015	—	—	—	—	—	—	—	—	—		I Kampanes Tou Edelweis (OST)
"Gia Sena"	Digital (single)	2015	—	5	4	16	—	—	—	—	—		Sinentefxi
"Xana Mana"	Digital (single)	2016	—	2	5	34	—	—	—	—	—		Sinentefxi
"Protimo Na Petheno"	Digital (single)	2016	—	9	—	47	—	—	—	—	—		Sinentefxi
"Kalokerina Filia"	Digital (single)	2017	—	16	—	33	—	—	—	—	—		digital singles only
"Afou"	Digital (single)	—	—	1	84	—	—	—	—	—			digital singles only
"Mesa Mou"	Digital (single)	2018	—	5	1	—	—	—	—	—	—		Iliotropia
"Iliotropia"	Digital (single)	2019	—	—	1	—	—	—	—	—	—		Iliotropia
"Tromagmeno Mou"	Digital (single)	2020	—	—	1	—	—	—	—	—	—		digital singles only
"Loulaki"	Digital (single)	2021	—	1	1	—	—	—	—	—	—		digital singles only
"Ki Omos Den Teleionei" (duet with Babis Stokas)	Digital (single)	2021	—	1	1	14	—	—	—	—	—		digital singles only
"Aima" (featuring Daphne Lawrence)	Digital (single)	2022	—	1	1	18	—	—	—	—	—	GRE: Platinum	digital singles only
"Gazoza"	Digital (single)	2022	—	1	1	3	—	—	—	—	—		digital singles only
"Ksana" (duet with Nikos Karvelas)	Digital (single)	2023	—	66	1	16	—	—	—	—	—		digital singles only
"Einai asteio"	Digital (single)	2023	—	1	1	19	—	—	—	—	—	GRE: Platinum	digital singles only
"Lekes"	Digital (single)	2023	—	1	1	5	—	—	—	—	—	GRE: 2× Platinum	digital singles only
"Protimo '24"	Digital (single)	2024	—	1	5	1	—	—	—	—	—		digital singles only
"Hrisopsara"	Digital (single)	2024	—	10	2	5	—	—	—	—	—		digital singles only
"Se periptosi pou"	Digital (single)	2024	—	1	1	1	—	—	—	—	—	GRE: 3× Platinum	digital singles only
"Ola gia ola"	Digital (single)	2025	—	1	1	1	—	—	—	—	—		
"—" denotes a title that did not chart, or was not released in that territory. * denotes unknown or unavailable information. "N/A" denotes that there was no chart for this type of release at the time of its release.

=== Full singles discography ===
- Radio singles released in Cyprus and Greece

==== 1974–1980 ====
Title	Year	Album
"S’ Agapo"	1974	Mikres Polities
"Mi Vazis Mavro"	1974	Hilia Eniakosa Tipota
"As Kanoume Apopse Mian Archi"	1977	As Kanoume Apopse Mian Arhi
"Na ‘Mouna Sta Heria Sou Karavi"	1977	As Kanoume Apopse Mian Arhi
"Sou Dosa Na Pieis"	1978	As Kanoume Apopse Mian Arhi
"Kirios Nobel"	1978	Ta Kalitera Mou Tragoudia
"O! Maria"	1978	Ta Kalitera Mou Tragoudia
"Autos Pou Perimeno"	1979	Kitrino Galazio
"Kitrino, Galazio Ke Menexedi"	1979	Kitrino Galazio
"Mi Stenahoriese Ki Ehi O Theos"	1980	Kitrino Galazio
"Vres Ton Tropo"	1980	Kitrino Galazio
"M’ Agapas"	1980	Kitrino Galazio
"Ti Ta Thelis"	1980	Kitrino Galazio

==== 1980–1990 ====
Title	Year	Album
"Methismeni Politia"	1980	Nai
"Oso Eho Foni"	1980	Nai
"Den Ime Monahi"	1980	Nai
"To Xero Tha Rthis Xana"	1981	Nai
"Na I Zoi"	1981	Nai
"Eine Sigmes"	1981	Anna Vissi
"Kalimera Kainouria Mou Agapi"	1981	Anna Vissi
"Poso S’ Agapo"	1981	Anna Vissi
"Horis Esena Ego Den Kano"	1982	Anna Vissi
"Thelo Mono Esena"	1982	Anna Vissi
"Tha Borousa"	1982	Anna Vissi
"Ta Matia Ta Dika Mou"	1982	Anna Vissi
"Mono I Agapi"	1982	Anna Vissi
"Eimai To Simera Kai Eisai To Chthes"	1983	Eimai To Simera Kai Eisai To Chthes
"Eho Tosa Na Thimame"	1984	Na 'Hes Kardia
"Zoi Na Ehoume"	1984	Na 'Hes Kardia
"Dodeka"	1985	Kati Simveni
"San Ke Mena Kamia"	1985	Kati Simveni
"Kati Simveni"	1985	Kati Simveni
"Otan Tha’Rthis"	1985	Kati Simveni
"Ti Eho Na Haso"	1986	Kati Simveni
"Pragmata"	1986	I Epomeni Kinisi
"Me Agapi Apo Mena Gia Sena"	1987	I Epomeni Kinisi
"I Epomeni Kinisi"	1987	I Epomeni Kinisi
"Skepasto"	1987	I Epomeni Kinisi
"Se Posa Tamplo"	1987	I Epomeni Kinisi
"Otan Kanoume Erota"	1987	I Epomeni Kinisi
"S’ Agapo Telia Ke Pavla"	1987	I Epomeni Kinisi
"1988 Ki Akoma S’ Agapo"	1988	Tora
"Tora"	1988	Tora
"Ta Koritsia Ine Atakta"	1988	Tora
"Ta Mathitika Hronia"	1988	Tora
"Magiko Hali"	1988	Tora
"Den S’ Allazo"	1988	Tora
"Empnefsi!"	1988	Empnefsi!
"Hula Hoop"	1989	Empnefsi!
"Londino"	1989	Empnefsi!
"Sa Dolofonos Maniakos"	1989	Empnefsi!
"Pseftika"	1989	Fotia
"Fotia"	1990	Fotia
"Oue Ki Aloimono"	1990	Fotia
"Mpalomataki"	1990	Fotia
"Kapnizo"	1990	Fotia

==== 1990–1999 ====
Title	Year	Album
"Fos"	1990	Eimai
"Ena Sou Leo"	1991	Eimai
"Eimai"	1991	Eimai
"Adika"	1991	Eimai
"Ipervoles"	1991	Eimai
"Daimones" with Nikos Karvelas	1991	Daimones OST
"Kleino Ta Matia"	1992	Daimones OST
"Emeis" with Nikos Karvelas	1992	Emeis
"Den Thelo Na Xeris"	1992	Emeis
"Ftaio" with Nikos Karbelas	1992	Emeis
"Nai"	1992	Emeis
"Lambo"	1992	Lambo
"Akoma Mia"	1993	Lambo
"Se Hriazome"	1993	Lambo
"O, ti Thes Ego"	1993	Lambo
"Re!"	1994	Re!
"Eimai Poli Kala"	1995	Re!
"Amin"	1995	Re!
"Eleni"	1995	Re!
"Eikosi Hronia"	1995	O! Kypros
"Min Ksehnas"	1995	cd-maxi Min Ksehnas
"Trellenome (Klima Tropiko)"	1996	Klima Tropiko
"Paralio"	1996	Klima Tropiko
"Ke Ti Egine"	1996	Klima Tropiko
"Parte Ta Ola"	1996	Klima Tropiko
"Ekatommiria"	1996	Klima Tropiko
"Sentonia"	1996	Klima Tropiko
"Travma"	1997	Travma
"Mavra Gialia"	1997	Travma
"Na ‘Se Kala"	1997	Travma
"Forgive Me This"	1997	Everything I Am
"S’ Eho Epithimisi"	1998	Antidoto
"Erotevmenaki"	1998	Antidoto
"Maga Vatout" featuring Paris	1998	Antidoto
"Pali Gia Sena"	1998	Antidoto
"Gazi"	1998	Antidoto
"Antidoto"	1999	Antidoto
"Mou Anikis"	1999	Antidoto
"Methismeni Mou Kardia"	1999	Antidoto

==== 2000–2009 ====
Title	Year	Album
"Everything I Am"	2000	Everything I Am
"Agapi Ipervoliki"	2000	Kravgi
"Den Me Agapas"	2000	Kravgi
"Kaka Pedia"	2000	Kravgi
"Ola Ta Lefta"	2000	Kravgi
"Kravgi"	2000	Kravgi
"Kalitera I Dio Mas" featuring Katy Garbi	2001	Kravgi
"Horis To Moro Mou"	2001	Kravgi
"Atmosfera Ilektrismeni"	2001	Kravgi
"Schizofrenia"	2001	Kravgi
"(AAA) AAA (Ke Horisame)"	2001	Kravgi
"Moni Mou"	2001	Kravgi
"Still In Love With You"	2001	Everything I Am
"I Mousiki Tou Anemou"	2001	Mala: I Mousiki Tou Anemou
"Tasis Aftoktonias"	2002	X
"Martirio" featuring Yiannis Parios	2002	X
"Sinharitiria"	2002	X
"Pes To Xana"	2003	X
"Tifli Empistosini"	2003	X
"Se Zilevo"	2003	X
"Min Psahnis Tin Agapi"	2003	Paraksenes Eikones
"Treno"	2003	Paraksenes Eikones
"Eisai"	2004	Paraksenes Eikones
"Erimi Poli"	2004	Paraksenes Eikones
"Psihedelia"	2004	Paraksenes Eikones
"Eho Pethani Gia Sena"	2004	Paraksenes Eikones
"Fevgo"	2004	Paraksenes Eikones
"Dodeka/Den Thelo Na Xeris"	2004	Anna Vissi Live
"Call Me"	2005	Nylon
"Lie"	2005	Nylon
"Nylon"	2005	Nylon
"Gia Teleftea Fora"	2005	Nylon
"Kinoumeni Ammos"	2005	Nylon
"Erota I Polemo" featuring Nivo (Goin’Through)	2006	Nylon
"Everything"	2006	Nylon
"To Parelthon Mou"	2008	Apagorevmeno
"Apagorevmeno"	2008	Apagorevmeno
"Stin Pira"	2009	Apagorevmeno
"Alitissa Psihi"	2009	Apagorevmeno
"Apo Makria Ki Agapimenoi"	2009	Apagorevmeno
"Fabulous"	2009	Apagorevmeno

==== 2010–2019 ====
Title	Year	Album
"Agapi Einai Esi"	2010	Agapi Einai Esi
"Den The Iparxi Allo"	2011	Agapi Einai Esi
"Omprella"	2011	Agapi Einai Esi
"Mono An Trellatho"	2011	Access All Areas
"Ora Na Fevgo"	2012	Access All Areas
"Mia Nichta To Poli"	2012	Access All Areas
"Tiraniemai"	2012	Access All Areas
"Venzini"	2012	Access All Areas
"Den Ine Psema"	2012	digital singles only
"Kala Christougenna"	2012	digital singles only
"Protimo"	2013	digital singles only
"I Pio Megali Apati Ine O Erotas"	2013	digital singles only
"I Kathimerinotita Mas"	2013	digital singles only
"Ena E Kanena" featuring Antonis Remos	2014	digital singles only
"Kaliteres Meres"	2014	digital singles only
"Apolito Keno" (2015 version)	2014	digital singles only
"As Min Poume… Tipota" featuring Emilianos Stamatakis	2015	I Kampanes Tou Edelweiss OST
"Gia Sena"	2015	Sinentefxi
"Xana Mana"	2016	Sinentefxi
"Sinentefxi"	2016	Sinentefxi
"Protimo Na Petheno"	2016	Sinentefxi
"Kalokerina Filia"	2017	digital singles only
"Afou"	2017	digital singles only
"Mesa Mou"	2018	Iliotropia
"Iliotropia"	2019	Iliotropia
"Osoi Agapane Den Pethenoune" featuring Yiota Yianna	2019	Iliotropia

==== 2020–2026 ====
Title	Year	Album
"Loulaki"	2020	Iliotropia
"Tromagmeno Mou"	2020	digital singles only
"Loulaki"	2021	digital singles only
"Ki Omos Den Teleioni" featuring Babis Stokas	2021	digital singles only
"Aima" featuring Daphne Lawrence	2022	digital singles only
"Gazoza"	2022	digital singles only
"Ksana" (duet with Nikos Karvelas)	2023	digital singles only
"Einai asteio"	2023	digital singles only
"Lekes"	2023	digital singles only
"Protimo '24"	2024	digital singles only
"Hrisopsara"	2024	digital singles only
"Se periptosi pou"	2024	digital singles only
"Ola gia ola"	2025	digital singles only
"Sandre"	2025	digital singles only
"Kalokairines Diakopes"	2025	digital singles only
"Exairesi"	2025	digital singles only
"Aigaio"	2026	digital singles only
"OLO PIO PANO"	2026	digital singles only
"Oxi Giati"	2026	digital singles only

==== As a featured artist ====
Title	Year	Album
"Sta Hronia Tis Ipomonis" George Dalaras featuring Anna Vissi	1975	Sta Psila Ta Parathiria
"Why Why" Nikos Karvelas featuring Anna Vissi	1985	Nick Carr
"Andistrofi Metrisi" Nikos Karvelas featuring Anna Vissi	1990	Diavolaki
"O Teleftaios Horos" Nikos Karvelas featuring Anna Vissi	1991	O Teleftaios Horos
"Sta 79" Nikos Karvelas featuring Anna Vissi	1991	O Teleftaios Horos
"Metra" Nikos Karvelas featuring Anna Vissi	1995	25 Ores
"Vre Kouto" Nikos Karvelas featuring Anna Vissi	1996	To Aroma Tis Amartias
"Ena Hrono To Perissotero" Nikos Karvelas featuring Anna Vissi	1998	Ena Hrono To Perissotero
"Mi Mou Pathis Tipota" Nikos Karvelas featuring Anna Vissi	1998	Ena Hrono To Perissotero
"Boom Boom Boom" Nikos Karvelas featuring Anna Vissi	2003	Party Gia Spasmenes Kardies EP
"Pote Mi Les Pote" Constantinos Christoforou featuring Anna Vissi	2003	I Agapi Sou Pai

== DVDs ==
- * denotes unknown or unavailable information.

Year	Album details	Peak chart positions			Certifications (sales thresholds)
Year	Album details	GRE	CYP	AUS	Certifications (sales thresholds)
2001	The Video Collection: Released: 2001; Label: Sony Music Greece/Columbia; Formats: DVD	1	—	2	
2005	Live: Released: 2005; Label: Sony Music Greece/Columbia; Formats: DVD	1	1	—	GRE: Platinum
2013	Daimones 2013: Released: November, 2013; Label: ELTHEA; Formats: DVD	*	*	—	
"—" denotes releases that did not chart or was not released

== Official compilations ==
- * denotes unknown or unavailable information.

Year	Album details	Peak chart positions	
Year	Album details	GRE	CYP
1980	Ta Kalitera Mou Tragoudia: Released: 1980; Label: Minos; Formats: LP, cassette, CD	*	*
1982	Oles I Epitihies Tis Anna Vissi: Released: 1982; Label: Minos; Formats: LP, cassette, CD	*	*
1993	Ta Prota Mou Tragoudia: Released: 1993; Label: Minos; Formats: LP, cassette, CD	*	*
1999	Anna Vissi: Released: 1999; Label: Sony Music Greece/Columbia; Formats: Cassette, CD	*	*
2002	I Balantes Tis Annas Vissi: Released: 2002; Label: Sony Music Greece/Columbia; Formats: Cassette, CD	23	*
2004	Methismeni Politeia 1974-1981: Released: 2004; Label: Minos; Formats: Cassette, CD	43	17
2006	14 Megala Tragoudia: Released: 2006; Label: Minos EMI; Formats: CD	*	*
2007	The Essential Anna Vissi: Released: September 11, 2007; Label: Sony Music Greece/Columbia; Formats: CD, digital download	*	*
2007	Back to Time (Complete EMI Years): Released: October 10, 2007; Label: Minos EMI/Capitol; Formats: CD, digital download	7	*
2012	Access All Areas: Released: December 6, 2012; Label: Minos EMI/Sony Music; Format: CD	3	*
2013	The Love Collection: Released: February 25, 2013; Label: Sony Music; Format: Digital download	—	—
2019	The Legendary Recordings 1982–2019: Released: December 10, 2019; Label: Panik Gold/Sony Music; Formats: Case with 32 CDS	68	*
"—" denotes releases that did not chart or was not released}

== Collaborations ==
- 1974: 18 Lianotragouda Tis Pikris Patridas (various)
- 1974: Welcome to Greece No 5 14 big hits syrtaki dances (various)
- 1974: Mikres Politeies (various)
- 1974: Mia Hara, Mia Kaimos (various)
- 1974: Xilia Enniakosia Tipota (various)
- 1975: Mia Xara, Mia Kaimos (various)
- 1975: Stavros Kougioumtzis' Sta Psila Ta Parathiria
- 1975: Zitima Chronou (various)
- 1975: Grammata Apo Ti Germania (various)
- 1976: Imnos Kai Thrinos Gia Tin Kipro/Eksi Tragoudia (various)
- 1980: To Tzitziki Kai I Parea Tou
- 1985: Nikos Karvelas' Nick Carr
- 1985: Gia ta Paidia (various)
- 1990: Nikos Karvelas Diavolaki
- 1991: Nikos Karvelas O Teleftaios Choros
- 1993: Sofia Karvela Kolla to!
- 1995: Nikos Karvelas 25 ores
- 1996: Nikos Karvelas To aroma tis Amartias
- 1998: Nikos Karvelas Ena Xrono to Perissotero
- 2000: Nikos Karvelas Ola Einai Entaxei
- 2003: Nikos Karvelas Party Gia Spasmenes Kardies
- 2003: Konstantinos Christoforou I Agapi Sou Paei

== International releases ==
- 1982: "Love Is a Lonely Weekend" (Single)
- 1997: "Forgive Me This" (Promo)
- 1997: "Forgive Me This" (Single)
- 1997: Travma (Australian Release)
- 1999: Anna Vissi (International Release)
- 2000: Re (Turkish Release)
- 2001: "Everything I Am" (CD & Single, Dutch release)
- 2001: Kravgi (Turkish Release) - Gold
- 2002: Kravgi (Australian Release)
- 2002: X (Turkish Release)
- 2004: Paraksenes Ikones (Turkish Release)
- 2005: Live (Turkish Release)
- 2005: Strange Pictures (Bulgarian Release of Paraksenes Ikones)
- 2005: "Call Me" (Single, USA Digital Download)
- 2006: Nylon (Turkish Release)
- 2006: "Everything" (Single, Swedish and Finnish Release)
- 2006: Nylon Euro-Edition (German, Austrian, Swiss, Taiwanese Release)
- 2007: The Essential Anna Vissi
