= Access All Areas (Anna Vissi album) =

Greatest hits album by Anna Vissi
- Released: December 6, 2012
- Recorded: 1977–2012
- Genre: Pop, dance, modern Laika
- Label: Minos-EMI, Vanilla Records, Sony Music Greece, Columbia
- Producer: Nikos Karvelas

Anna Vissi chronology
The Essential Anna Vissi (2007)	Access All Areas (2012)	The Love Collection (2013)

Access All Areas is a compilation album released by singer Anna Vissi in December 2012 in Greece and Cyprus by Minos EMI and Sony Music Greece. This 5-CD album was released on a limited edition of 500 numbered copies to celebrate 40 years of Vissis musical career. It also included a book of photographs of Vissi by photographer and director Christine Crokos. As the 500 copies were sold within days of its release, the collection was re-released on further 750 (also numbered) copies.

== Track listing ==
Disc 1
No.	Title	Writer(s)	Original release	Length
1.	"Oso Eho Foni (Όσο Έχω Φωνή)"	Filippos Nikolaou	from the album Nai	2:21
2.	"As Kanoume Apopse Mian Archi (Ας Κάνουμε Απόψε Μιαν Αρχή)"	Doros Georgiades	from the album As Kanoume Apopse Mian Arhi	3:45
3.	"Autos Pou Perimeno (Αυτός Που Περιμένω)"	Spiros Vlassopoulos, Dimitris Iatropoulos	from the album Kitrino Galazio	2:56
4.	"San Ke Mena Kamia (Σαν Και Μένα Καμιά)"	Nikos Karvelas	from the album Kati Simveni	2:45
5.	"Antistrofi Metrisi (Αντίστροφη Μέτρηση)" (duet with Karvelas)	Karvelas	from Karvelas album Diavolaki	3:38
6.	"Me Agapi Apo Mena Gia Sena (Με Αγάπη Από ‘Μένα Για ‘Σένα)"	Karvelas	from the album I Epomeni Kinisi	2:34
7.	"Boom Boom Boom" (duet with Karvelas)	Karvelas	from Karvelas EP Party Gia Spasmenes Kardies	4:25
8.	"Emis (Εμείς)" (duet with Karvelas)	Karvelas	from the album Emeis	3:42
9.	"Fotia (Φωτιά)"	Karvelas	from the album Fotia	3:56
10.	"O Telefteos Horos (Ο Τελευταίος Χορός)" (duet with Karvelas)	Karvelas	from Karvelas album O Teleftaios Horos	5:53
11.	"Akoma Mia (Ακόμα Μία)"	Karvelas	from the album Lambo	4:56
12.	"Antidoto (Αντίδοτο)"	Karvelas	from the album Antidoto	4:44
13.	"Vre Kouto (Βρε Κουτό)" (duet with Karvelas)	Karvelas	from Karvelas album 25 Ores	3:47
14.	"Ena Ηrono To Perissotero (Ένα Χρόνο Το Περισσότερο)" (duet with Karvelas)	Karvelas	from Karvelas album Ena Hrono To Perissotero	5:07
15.	"Logia Ke Siopes (Λόγια Και Σιωπές)"	Karvelas	from the album Nylon	5:16
16.	"Den Tha Iparxi Allo (Δεν Θα Υπάρξει Άλλο)"	Karvelas	from the album Agapi Einai Esi	4:06
17.	"Ise (Είσαι)"	Karvelas	from the album Paraksenes Eikones	4:22
18.	"Nylon"	Karvelas	from the album Nylon	4:54
19.	"Erotevmenaki (Ερωτευμενάκι)"	Karvelas	from the album Antidoto	3:22
20.	"Gia Ena Oniro Zume (Για Ένα Όνειρο Ζούμε)"	Karvelas	from the OST album Mala: I Mousiki Tou Anemou	3:45

Disc 2
No.	Title	Writer(s)	Original release	Length
1.	"Dodeka (Δώδεκα)"	Karvelas, Filippos Nikolaou, Karvelas	from the album Kati Simveni	5:21
2.	"Kalimera Kainouria Mou Agapi (Καλημέρα Καινούρια Μου Αγάπη)"	Anna Vissi, Nikos Leonardos	from the album Anna Vissi	2:41
3.	"Methismeni Politia (Μεθυσμένη Πολιτεία)"	Dimitris Iatropoulos, Mihalis Mikelis	from the album Nai	3:34
4.	"Kontra (Κόντρα)" (Breathless)	Dan Wilson, Mirto Kontova	from the album Apagorevmeno	3:52
5.	"Apo Makria Ki Agapimeni (Από Μακριά Κι Αγαπημένοι)" (remix by Alex Papaconstantinou)	Mirto Kontova, Anna Vissi	from the album Apagorevmeno+	4:01
6.	"Eki (Εκεί)"	Karvelas	from the album Travma	4:46
7.	"Mavra Yialia (Μαύρα Γυαλιά)"	Karvelas	from the album Travma	4:41
8.	"Se Skeftome Sihenia (Σε Σκέφτομαι Συνέχεια)"	Karvelas	from the album Fotia	3:51
9.	"I Epomeni Kinisi (Η Επόμενη Κίνηση)"	Karvelas	from the album I Epomeni Kinisi	5:07
10.	"Eleni (Ελένη)"	Karvelas	from the second edition of the album Re!	4:55
11.	"Atmosfera Electrismeni (Ατμόσφαιρα Ηλεκτρισμένη)"	Karvelas	from the album Kravgi	5:14
12.	"Pseftika (Ψεύτικα)"	Karvelas	from the album Fotia	4:09
13.	"Sentonia (Σεντόνια)"	Natalia Germanou, Karvelas	from the album Klima Tropiko	3:45
14.	"Ime (Είμαι)"	Karvelas	from the album Eimai	4:31
15.	"Travma (Τραύμα)"	Karvelas	from the album Travma	4:31
16.	"Ola Ta Lefta (Όλα Τα Λεφτά)"	Karvelas	from the album Kravgi	3:47
17.	"Lambo! (Λάμπω!)"	Karvelas	from the album Lambo	4:18
18.	"Fos (Φως)"	Karvelas	from the album Eimai	4:14

Disc 3
No.	Title	Writer(s)	Original release	Length
1.	"Stin Pira (Στην Πυρά)"	Mirto Kontova, Markus Englof, Adam Baptiste, Alex Papaconstantinou	from the album Apagorevmeno	3:07
2.	"Agapi Ipervoliki (Αγάπη Υπερβολική)"	Karvelas	from the album Kravgi	4:50
3.	"Den Thelo Na Xeris (Δεν Θέλω Να Ξέρεις)"	Karvelas	from the album Emeis	5:22
4.	"Min Psahnis Tin Agapi (Μην Ψάχνεις Την Αγάπη)"	Karvelas	from the album Paraksenes Eikones	4:58
5.	"Ki Eho Tosa Na Thimame (Κι Έχω Τόσα Να Θυμάμαι)"	Anna Vissi, Karvelas	from the album Na 'Hes Kardia	3:46
6.	"Kaka Pedia (Κακά Παιδιά)"	Karvelas	from the album Kravgi	5:10
7.	"Protereotita (Προτεραιότητα)"	Karvelas	from the album Agapi Einai Esi	4:15
8.	"Tasis Aftoktonias (Τάσεις Αυτοκτονίας)"	Karvelas	from the album X	4:08
9.	"Vaterlo (Βατερλώ)"	Karvelas	from the album Paraksenes Eikones	3:57
10.	"Psihedelia"	Karvelas	from the album Paraksenes Eikones	3:45
11.	"Ena Sou Leo (Ένα Σου Λέω)"	Karvelas	from the album Eimai	3:54
12.	"Ebnefsi (Έμπνευση)"	Karvelas	from the album Empnefsi!	3:21
13.	"Skepasto (Σκέπαστο)"	Karvelas	from the album I Epomeni Kinisi	2:23
14.	"San Dolofonos Maniakos (Σαν Δολοφόνος Μανιακός)"	Karvelas	from the album Empnefsi!	5:10
15.	"Kipseli (Κυψέλη)"	Anna Vissi, Karvelas	from the album Tora	3:23
16.	"Trellonome [Klima Tropiko] (Τρελλαίνομαι [Κλίμα Τροπικό])"	Karvelas	from the album Klima Tropiko	3:55
17.	"Gazi (Γκάζι)"	Karvelas	from the album Antidoto	5:07
18.	"Den Me Agapas (Δεν Με Αγαπάς)"	Karvelas	from the album Kravgi	4:56

Disc 4
No.	Title	Writer(s)	Original release	Length
1.	"Mono An Trelatho (Μόνο Αν Τρελαθώ)"	Mirto Kontova, Tsagaris Marios	New song	4:03
2.	"Treno (Τρένο)"	Sofi Pappa, Vangelis Vasiliou	from the album Paraksenes Eikones	4:50
3.	"Afti Ti Fora (Αυτή Τη Φορά)"	Karvelas	from the album Kravgi	6:15
4.	"Ti Eho Na Haso (Τι Έχω Να Χάσω)"	Karvelas	from the album Kati Simveni	3:50
5.	"Alitissa Psihi (Αλήτισσα Ψυχή)"	Vagia Kalantzi, Giannis Kifonidis	from the album Apagorevmeno	4:13
6.	"Kravgi (Κραυγή)"	Karvelas	from the album Kravgi	4:48
7.	"Gia Teleftea Fora (Για Τελευταία Φορά)"	Karvelas	from the album Nylon	4:41
8.	"Pes To Xana (Πες Το Ξανά)"	Karvelas	from the album X	3:51
9.	"Thanatos Ine I Agapi (Θάνατος Είναι Η Αγάπη)"	Karvelas	from the album Travma	4:49
10.	"I Mousiki Tou Anemou (Η Μουσική Του Ανέμου)"	Karvelas	from the OST album Mala: I Mousiki Tou Anemou	4:31
11.	"Paralio (Παραλύω)"	Karvelas	from the album Klima Tropiko	5:20
12.	"Pragmata (Πράγματα)"	Karvelas, Giorgos Mitsingas, Anna Vissi	from the album I Epomeni Kinisi	4:37
13.	"Ta Mathitika Hronia (Τα Μαθητικά Χρόνια)"	Karvelas	from the album Tora	6:42
14.	"Apodiksis (Αποδείξεις)"	Karvelas	from the album I Epomeni Kinisi	2:46
15.	"Londino (Λονδίνο)"	Karvelas	from the album Empnefsi!	4:48
16.	"Na Ton Agapas (Να Τον Αγαπάς)"	Natalia Germanou, Karvelas	from the album Antidoto	4:43
17.	"Tora (Τώρα)"	Karvelas	from the album Tora	3:19

Disc 5
No.	Title	Writer(s)	Original release	Length
1.	"Tiranieme (Τυραννιέμαι)"	Karvelas	New song	4:00
2.	"Ime Poli Kala (Είμαι Πολύ Καλά)"	Evi Droutsa, Karvelas	from the album Re!	5:30
3.	"O Ponos Tis Agapis (Ο Πόνος Της Αγάπης)"	Karvelas	from the album Antidoto	5:32
4.	"Venzini (Βενζίνη)"	Karvelas	New song	3:59
5.	"Sadismos (Σαδισμός)"	Karvelas	from the album Kravgi	5:22
6.	"Demones (Δαίμονες)" (duet with Karvelas)	Stavros Sideras, Karvelas	from the OST album Daimones	3:53
7.	"Mia Nichta To Poli (Μια Νύχτα Το Πολύ)"	Karvelas	New song	4:40
8.	"E Zoe Sinehizete (Η Ζωή Συνεχίζεται)"	Karvelas	from the album Eimai	3:53
9.	"Ke Ti Egine (Και Τι Έγινε)"	Karvelas	from the album Klima Tropiko	4:19
10.	"Thivet (Θιβέτ)"	Karvelas	from the album Kravgi	5:56
11.	"Ora Na Fevgo (Ώρα Να Φεύγω)"	Karvelas	New song	3:53

== Charts ==
Although the album was released in limited edition, it managed to chart on the top 40 of the Greek IFPI Charts. When re-released in March, the album peaked at number 3 of the official Greek album charts.

Chart	Providers	Peak position	Certification
Greek Albums Chart	IFPI	3	
