= Mala =

Mala may refer to:

== Arts and entertainment ==
=== Fictional characters ===
- Mala (Amazon), an Amazon from Wonder Woman's side of the DC Universe
- Mala (Kryptonian), a villain from Superman's corner of the DC Universe

=== Films and television ===
- Mala (1941 film), a Bollywood drama film
- Mala (1991 film), a Yugoslav drama film with Danilo Stojković
- Mala (2013 film), an Argentine crime film

=== Music ===
- Mala (Yolandita Monge album), 2008
  - "Mala" (Yolandita Monge song), a song from the album
- Mala (Devendra Banhart album), 2013
- "Mala" (6ix9ine song), 2018
- "Mala", a song by Elettra Lamborghini from Twerking Queen, 2019
- "Mala", a song by Maluma from Magia (Maluma album), 2012
- "Mala", a song by Peso Pluma from Éxodo, 2024
- Mala: I Mousiki Tou Anemou, a 2002 Greek soundtrack album by Anna Vissi
  - "Mala: I Mousiki Tou Anemou" (song), a song from the album
- Mala Records, a record label

== Languages ==
- Mala language, a Papuan language
- Mala language (Nigeria), a language of Nigeria

== People ==
=== Given name ===
- Mala (Pakistani singer) (1939–1990), Pakistani playback singer of Urdu and Punjabi films
- Mala Aravindan (1939–2015), Malayalam film actor
- Mala Bakhtiyar, Iraqi Kurdish politician
- Mala Gaonkar (born 1969), American businessperson
- Mala Htun (1969 or 1970–2025), American political scientist
- Mala Kachalla (1941–2007), former governor of Borno State in Nigeria
- Mala Powers (1931–2007), American actress
- Mala Rodríguez, also known as La Mala, La Mala María, Spanish hip hop rapper
- Mala Roy, Indian politician
- Mala Sinha (born 1936), Indian actress
- Mala Sen (1947–2011), Bengali-Indian-British writer and human rights activist
- Mala Zimetbaum (1922–1944), Belgian woman of Polish Jewish descent executed for escaping from the Auschwitz-Birkenau concentration camp

=== Nickname ===
- Malá (footballer) (born 1979), Bissau-Guinean football midfielder
- Mala (musician), a member of Deep Dub duo Digital Mystikz

=== Surname ===
- Doueugui Mala (born 1993), Ivorian footballer
- Esat Mala (born 1998), Albanian footballer
- Ray Mala (1906–1952), Native American movie actor
- Shormi Mala, Bangladeshi stage, television and film actress
- Zef Mala (1915–1979), Albanian publicist and communist activist
- Malek El Mala (born 2005), German football striker
- Maluca Mala, American singer
- Said El Mala (born 2006), German football winger
- Malá, feminine form of the Czech surname Malý

== Places ==
=== Asia ===
- Mala, Homalin, a village in Burma
- Mala, Kerala, a village in southern India
- Mala, Nepal, a village and village development committee
- Mala, a village in Jaghori District, Ghazni, Afghanistan

=== Europe ===
- Mała, a village in Poland
- Mäla, a village in western Estonia
- Malå, a locality and the administrative center of Malå Municipality
- Malå Municipality, in northern Sweden
- Mala, Sweden, a village to Skåne County in Sweden
- Mallow, County Cork, Ireland, a town

=== South America ===
- Mala District, Peru
  - Mala, Cañete Province, capital of the district

=== Elsewhere ===
- Mala, Lanzarote, a village in the Canary Islands
- Malaita or Mala, an island of the Solomon Islands

== Other uses ==
- Chera dynasty or Mala, South India
- Cyclone Mala, a cyclonic storm that killed 22 people in Myanmar in 2006
- Japamala, also known as mala, a loop of prayer beads commonly used in several Indian religions
- Mala (caste) or Mala community, from Andhra Pradesh
- Mala (river), a small tributary of the Danube in Romania
- Mala (seasoning) (麻辣, or málà), a numbing and spicy Chinese seasoning made from Sichuan pepper
- Malå IF, Swedish football club located in Malå in Västerbotten County
- Mala story, an Aboriginal Dreamtime story of central Australia
- Metformin-associated lactic acidosis (MALA)
- Metropolis-adjusted Langevin algorithm (MALA), a Markov chain Monte Carlo method
- Rufous hare-wallaby or mala, a small wallaby native to Australia
- R-1 and R-2 Mala-class swimmer delivery vehicle, a Yugoslav (later Croatian) vessel type

== See also ==
- Japamala, often shortened to mala, religious beads
- Mala Mala (disambiguation)
- Malla (disambiguation)
- Malaa, Bangladeshi-Australian singer
