= Everything I Am =

Everything I Am may refer to:

- Everything I Am (album), a 2000 album by Anna Vissi
- "Everything I Am" (Anna Vissi song), 2000
- "Everything I Am" (Kanye West song), 2007
- Everything I Am, a 2003 album by Ann Winsborn
- "Everything I Am", a 1967 song by The Box Tops
- "Everything I Am", a 2020 song by Nathan Hartono
