= Autostop/Love Is a Lonely Weekend =

Single by Anna Vissi

from the album Back To Time (Complete EMI Years)
- Released: May 2006
- Recorded: 1980, 1982
- Genre: Pop
- Length: 5:49
- Label: Minos EMI
- Songwriter: Anna Vissi

Anna Vissi singles chronology
"Call Me" (2004)	"Autostop/Love Is a Lonely Weekend" (2006)	"Everything" (2006)

"Autostop/Love Is a Lonely Weekend" is a limited-edition single by Greek singer-songwriter Anna Vissi released in May 2006 by her former label Minos EMI.

== Production and recording ==
In March 2006 Vissi was selected by Hellenic Radio and Television (ERT) as Greece's entrant in the Eurovision Song Contest 2006 which was held in Athens due to Greece's win the previous year. A national final with four songs was held where the song "Everything" composed by Nikos Karvelas with lyrics by Vissi herself, was chosen as the Greek entry in March. Vissi had also participated in the Contest on two other occasion while she was still signed to Minos EMI: Greece in 1980 with "Autostop", finishing 13th with 30 points, and for Cyprus in 1982 with "Mono I Agapi", finishing fifth with 82 points. While her first performance was not a success, her second remains the highest placing that Cyprus has ever achieved in the Contest. Following Vissi's later performance, she joined with Nikos Karvelas in an exclusive songwriting collaboration and with him they released an independent album in 1982 titled Eimai To Simera Kai Eisai To Hthes under their own label CarVi (CARvelas + VIssi); Vissi's contract with Minos EMI did not allow for this and the album was deleted in a lawsuit in favor of Minos EMI, while Vissi then switched labels. The rights to the two Eurovision songs still belonged to EMI and thus they were never officially released on any of Vissi's studio albums. However, in honor of her third participation in the Eurovision Song Contest, Minos EMI released a limited edition double A-side single containing both tracks prior to the release of Vissi's Eurovision entry for promotion. The songs were also released on a 2006 remastered edition of Vissi's self-titled 1981 album, which was now titled 4, on the count of it being her fourth studio album. The title of the English-language version of the track "Mono i agapi" was chosen instead as the name of the single, although the Greek-language version is the one that is actually featured.

== Music and lyrics ==
Vissi's first Eurovision entry was composed by Jick Nacassian with lyrics by Rony Sofu. The song was performed with the backing group The Epikouri, which also included Vissi's sister Lia. The second entry was written entirely by Vissi herself. Although there had been speculation that Karvelas actually wrote it, Vissi did not begin an exclusive collaboration with him until after the Contest, meaning that the release of the 2006 single was among the only releases of Vissi not to be produced by Karvelas since the 1980s.

== Track listing ==
1. "Autostop"-3:04 (Jick Nicassian, Rony Sofu)
2. "Mono i agapi" (Love Is A Lonely Weekend)-2:45 (Anna Vissi)

== Charts ==
Chart (2006)	Peak position
Greek Single Charts	1
