= Kravgi =

2000 album by Anna Vissi

Kravgi Κραυγή

Studio album by Anna Vissi
- Released: 23 November 2000
- Studios: Echo studio Air studio
- Genres: Pop, Electronic, Modern laika
- Length: 1:50:35
- Language: Greek
- Labels: Sony Music Greece; Columbia
- Producer: Nikos Karvelas

Anna Vissi chronology
Everything I Am (2000)	Kravgi; Κραυγή (2000)	X (2002)

Singles from Kravgi
- 1. "Agapi ipervoliki" Released: July 2000; 2. "De me agapas" Released: August 2000; 3. "Kaka paidia" Released: September 2000; 4. "Ola ta lefta" Released: October 2000; 5. "Kravgi" Released: November 2000; 6. "Kalitera i dio mas" Released: December 2000; 7. "Horis to moro mou" Released: February 2001; 8. "Moni mou" Released: March 2001; 9. "Atmosfaira ilektrismeni" Released: April 2001; 10. "To poli poli" Released: May 2001; 11. "AAA (AAA) kai horisame" Released: June 2001

Kravgi (Greek: Κραυγή; English: Scream) is the 20th studio album by Greek singer Anna Vissi. It was released on 23 November 2000 by Sony Music Greece, and later was released by Sony Music in Turkey in 2001 as well as in Australia and New Zealand in 2002.

The album was received seven times platinum certification in Greece and Cyprus, and platinum in Turkey. It was the best-selling album of 2000 in Greece and Cyprus. In Australia, it charted within the top 75 of the official Australian charts and is the best selling Greek album in the country. Today, the album stands as one of the most successful albums of all time in Greece with sales passed over 175,000 copies (350,000 discs).

This album, along with English-speaking album Everything I Am, released the same year, showcased a significant change over Anna's stylistic and musical selections, expanding her image as a pop icon and contemporary artist as promoted in the mid-1990s and onwards.

== Release ==
After the release of the album Antidoto, Vissi spent most of her time outside of Greece. On 15 July 2000, the CD single Agapi Ipervoliki was released which included six new songs and received quadruple-platinum certification. Her first album after Antidoto was the English-speaking album Everything I Am which released on 23 October 2000. One month later, Kravgi was released which included 17 new songs, as well as the six tracks from the last CD single and a remix of a previous release (the track "Kapnizo" from the album Fotia). It also is her first double studio album.

In 2019, the album was selected for inclusion in the Panik Gold Records box set "The Legendary Recordings 1982–2019". The release came after Panik's acquisition rights of Anna's back catalogue from her previous company, Sony Music Greece. This box set was printed on a limited edition of 500 copies containing CD releases of all of her albums from 1982 to 2019 plus unreleased material.

In late 2025, Sony Music Greece announced a coloured double-vinyl limited reissue, as part of the Rainbow Collection, released for pre-order as a collector's item. A meet-and-greet, scheduled for December 12, was then attended by 150 fans, who were able to have their own copies personally signed by the artist.

== Track listing ==
All lyrics are written by Nikos Karvelas (except 5, 6 and 7); all music is composed by Nikos Karvelas (except 5 and 7).

Disc 1
No.	Title	Lyrics	Music	Length
1.	"Kravgi" (Κραυγή; Scream)			4:50
2.	"Sadismos" (Σαδισμός; Sadism)			5:25
3.	"Horis to moro mou" (Χωρίς το μωρό μου; Without my baby)			3:57
4.	"Kalitera i dio mas (featuring Katy Garbi)" (Καλύτερα οι δυο μας; Better the two of us)	Natalia Germanou		4:16
5.	"Shizofrenia" (Σχιζοφρένεια; Schizophrenia)	Antonis Pappas	Nikos Terzis	4:07
6.	"Apopse leipeis apo 'do" (Απόψε λείπεις από 'δω; Tonight you're not here)	Dimitris Patsios		4:27
7.	"Moni mou" (Μόνη μου; By Myself)	Nikos Vaxevanellis	Vasilis Kelaidis	3:56
8.	"Agapoula mou" (Αγαπούλα μου; My sweetheart)			3:30
9.	"Kardia apo petra" (Καρδιά από πέτρα; Heart of stone)			4:16
10.	"Thivet" (Θιβέτ; Tibet)			5:58
11.	"De Me Agapas" (Δε με αγαπάς; You don't love me)			4:58
12.	"Ola ta lefta" (Όλα τα λεφτά; All the money)			3:47
Total length:				53:27

All lyrics are written by Nikos Karvelas (except 5 and 7); all music is composed by Nikos Karvelas (except 7).

Disc 2
No.	Title	Lyrics	Music	Length
1.	"Atmosfaira ilektrismeni" (Ατμόσφαιρα ηλεκτρισμένη; Atmosphere electrified)			5:17
2.	"To poli poli" (Το πολύ πολύ; At Most)			4:28
3.	"AAA (AAA) kai korisame" (ΑΑΑ (ΑΑΑ) και χωρίσαμε; AAA (AAA) And we broke up)			3:02
4.	"To teleftaio tsigaro" (Το τελευταίο τσιγάρο; The last cigarette)			4:56
5.	"Kopike i grammi" (Κόπηκε η γραμμή; The line was cut)	Natalia Germanou		4:03
6.	"Nostalgia" (Νοσταλγία; Nostalgia)			5:21
7.	"Mi mou les" (Μη μου λες; Don't tell Me)	Tasos Vougiatzis	Nikos Terzis	4:04
8.	"Kapnizo (Remix)" (Καπνίζω; I smoke)			5:25
9.	"Kaka paidia" (Κακά παιδιά; Bad guys)			5:14
10.	"Epilogi mou" (Επιλογή μου; My choice)			4:09
11.	"Afti ti fora" (Αυτή τη φορά; This time)			6:18
12.	"Agapi ipervoliki" (Αγάπη υπερβολική; Excessive love)			4:51
Total length:				57:08

== International editions ==
Kravgi was released in Turkey (as a follow-up to the album Re!), in Australia and in New Zealand. In Australia and New Zealand, the album kept its original track listing. But in Turkey, it was released as a 17-track album:

Disc 1
No.	Title	Length
1.	"Kravgi" (Κραυγή; Scream)	4:50
2.	"Kalitera i dio mas (featuring Katy Garbi)" (Καλύτερα οι δυο μας; Better the two of us)	4:16
3.	"Horis Tt moro mou" (Χωρίς το μωρό μου; Without my baby)	3:57
4.	"Sadismos" (Σαδισμός; Sadism)	5:25
5.	"Kardia apo petra" (Καρδιά από πέτρα; Heart of stone)	4:16
6.	"Shizofrenia" (Σχιζοφρένεια; Schizophrenia)	4:07
7.	"Apopse leipeis apo 'do" (Απόψε λείπεις από 'δω; Tonight you're not here)	4:27
8.	"Agapoula mou" (Αγαπούλα μου; My sweetheart)	3:30
9.	"De me agapas" (Δε με αγαπάς; You don't love me)	4:58
10.	"Atmosfaira ilektrismeni" (Ατμόσφαιρα ηλεκτρισμένη; Atmosphere electrified)	5:17
11.	"To poli poli" (Το πολύ πολύ; At most)	4:28
12.	"AAA (AAA) Kai horisame" (ΑΑΑ (ΑΑΑ) και χωρίσαμε; AAA (AAA) And we broke up)	3:02
13.	"To teleftaio tsigaro" (Το τελευταίο τσιγάρο; The last cigarette)	4:56
14.	"Kopike i grammi" (Κόπηκε η γραμμή; The line was cut)	4:03
15.	"Nostalgia" (Νοσταλγία; Nostalgia)	5:21
16.	"Kaka paidia" (Κακά παιδιά; Bad guys)	5:14
17.	"Agapi ipervoliki" (Αγάπη υπερβολική; Excessive love)	4:51
Total length:		1:17:18

== Singles ==
The following singles were officially released to radio stations, some of them with music videos, and gained massive airplay.

1. "Agapi ipervoliki"
2. "De me agapas"
3. "Kaka paidia"
4. "Ola ta lefta"
5. "Kravgi"
6. "Kalitera i dio mas"
7. "Horis to moro mou"
8. "Moni mou"
9. "Atmosfera ilektrismeni"
10. "To poli poli"
11. "AAA (AAA) kai horisame"

== Credits ==
Credits adapted from liner notes.

=== Personnel ===
- Mohamend Arafa – percussion (1–4, 1–8, 2–6)
- Vasilis Eliadis – säz (1–9, 2–2, 2–7)
- Manos Govatzidakis – orchestration, keyboards (2–8) / programming (1–4, 1–11, 2–8)
- Telis Kafkas – bass (1–6, 1–7, 1–8, 2–1, 2–4, 2–6)
- Nikos Karvelas – orchestration (1–4, 1–6, 1–7, 1–8, 1–10, 1–11, 1–12, 2–1, 2–4, 2–5, 2–6, 2–9, 2–10, 2–11, 2–12) / keyboards (2–10, 2–12) / drums (1–12) / guitars (1–7, 2–1, 2–9) / percussion (2–1, 2–9) / dulcimer (2–9) / backing vocals (1–5, 2–3)
- Takis Kouvatseas – drums (1–10, 2–5, 2–9, 2–11)
- George Laskaris – percussion (1–9)
- Yiannis Lionakis – guitars (1–6, 1–7, 1–8, 1–10, 1–12, 2–1, 2–4, 2–5, 2–6, 2–9, 2–11) / bouzouki (1–7, 1–11, 1–12, 2–1) / cura (1–6, 1–8) / baglama (1–7, 1–8, 1–12, 2–1)
- Takis Magkafas – orchestration, programming, keyboards (1–1, 1–2)
- Kostas Miliotakis – keyboards (1–4, 1–6, 1–7, 1–8, 1–10, 1–11, 1–12, 2–1, 2–4, 2–5, 2–6, 2–9, 2–11)
- Panayiotis Moshovoudis – bass (1–10, 2–5, 2–9, 2–11)
- Christos Olympios – guitars, baglama (2–5) / bouzouki (2–5, 2–9) / cura (2–11)
- Martin Right – programming (2–10, 2–12)
- Panayiotis Stergiou – cura (1–3) / baglama (2–2) / cümbüş (1–3, 2–7)
- Christos Tabouratzis – guitars (1–3, 2–3, 2–7)
- Nikos Terzis – orchestration, programming, keyboards (1–3, 1–5, 1–9, 2–2, 2–3, 2–7)
- Lakis Tsiatsiamis – drums (1–6, 1–7, 1–8, 2–1, 2–4, 2–6)
- Thanasis Vasilopoulos – clarinet (1–2, 1–4, 1–6, 2–4, 2–6) / ney (2–4)
- Anna Vissi – backing vocals (1–1, 1–2, 1–3, 1–5, 2–3)
- Zeebadee – didgeridoo (1–10)

=== Production ===
- Verona Antypa – sound engineer's assistant
- Thodoris Chrisanthopoulos (Fabelsound) – mastering
- Rupert Coulson – sound engineer, mix engineer (1–10, 2–5, 2–9, 2–11)
- Dimitris Dimitroulis – make up
- Manos Govatzidakis – sound engineer (1–4, 1–6, 1–7, 1–8, 1–11, 1–12, 2–1, 2–4, 2–6, 2–8) / mix engineer (2–8)
- Ricky Graham – sound engineer (1–10, 2–5, 2–9, 2–11)
- Alexis Kamitsos – photographer
- Nikos Karvelas – production manager / mix engineer's assistant (2–9, 2–11)
- Levinia Konyalian – spiritual styling
- Christos Kosmas – sound engineer (1–1, 1–2, 1–3, 1–4, 1–5, 1–6, 1–7, 1–8, 1–9, 1–11, 1–12, 2–1, 2–2, 2–3, 2–4, 2–6, 2–7) / mix engineer (1–4, 1–6, 1–7, 1–8, 1–11, 1–12, 2–1, 2–4, 2–6)
- Yiannis Lionakis – mix engineer's assistant (2–9, 2–11)
- Takis Magkafas – mix engineer (1–1, 1–2, 1–3, 1–5, 1–9, 2–2, 2–3, 2–7)
- Markos Melidis – photographer's assistant
- Arsenis Miaris – photo processing
- Leonardo Orfanidis – mood direction
- Panos Pitsilidis – artwork
- Neale Ricotti – sound engineer's assistant (1–10, 2–5, 2–9, 2–11)
- Martin Right – sound engineer, mix engineer (2–10, 2–12)
- Christos Simitas – photo processing
- Stefanos Vasilakis – hair styling
- Alexis Valourdos – photo processing

== Charts ==
Chart (2001)	Peak position	Certification
Australian Albums (ARIA)	66	-
Cypriot Albums (All Records Top 20)	1	7×Platinum
Greek Albums (IFPI Greece)	1	7×Platinum
Turkish Albums (Turkey Charts)	1	Platinum
