= Min Ksehnas =

Single by Anna Vissi
- Released: 1995
- Recorded: 1995
- Genre: Pop
- Label: Sony Music Greece/Columbia
- Songwriter(s): Nikos Karvelas
- Producer(s): Nikos Karvelas

Anna Vissi singles chronology
"Eimai Poli Kala" (1995)	"Min Ksehnas" (1995)	"Amin" (1995)

"Min Ksehnas" is a rare single released by Greek pop singer Anna Vissi in 1995. The single was released only in Cyprus in limited edition and all proceed from its sales went to charity. It featured the previously unreleased "Min Ksehnas" and "Eleni", which Anna Vissi dedicated to her fan Eleni Karkanta and was later featured in the repackage of her popular album Re!.

== Track listing ==
1. "Min Ksehnas" (Don't forget)
2. "Eleni" (Helen)
