= Mala: I Mousiki Tou Anemou (song) =

Single by Anna Vissi

from the album Mala: I Mousiki Tou Anemou original soundtrack
- Released: 2001
- Recorded: 2001
- Label: Sony Music Greece/Columbia Records
- Songwriter: Nikos Karvelas
- Producer: Nikos Karvelas

Anna Vissi singles chronology
"Still in Love with You"	"Mala: I Mousiki Tou Anemou"	"Call Me"

"Mala: I Mousiki Tou Anemou" (Greek: Μάλα: Η Μουσική του Ανέμου; English: Mala: the music of the wind) is a single by Anna Vissi from the original soundtrack of the same name, released in 2002 by Sony Music in Greece and Cyprus.

== Release ==
The single was released as promotion for the full-length soundtrack of the theatrical opera about a love story during the Holocaust where Vissi played the lead of Mala Zimetbaum.

== Track listing ==
1. "I Mousiki Tou Anemou" (The music of the wind)
2. "Gia Ena Oneiro Zoume" (We live for a dream)
3. "O, Erota" (Oh love!)
4. "I Mousiki Tou Anemou (Instrumental)" (The music of the wind (Instrumental))

== Chart performance ==
Chart	Peak position	Certification
Greek Singles Chart	1	Gold
Cypriot Singles Chart	1	Platinum
