= The Remixes (Anna Vissi EP) =

EP by Anna Vissi
- Released: 2003
- Recorded: 2003
- Genre: Pop, dance
- Label: Sony Music Greece/Columbia
- Producer: Nikos Karvelas

Anna Vissi chronology
X (2003)	The Remixes (2003)	Paraksenes Eikones (2003)

The Remixes is an EP by Greek pop singer Anna Vissi, which was released in the summer of 2003 and included remixed songs from her album X.

== Track listing ==
1. "Se Zilevo (Galleon Electro-Pop Mix)"
2. "Tyfli Empistosyni (Takis Damaschis Remix)"
3. "X (Soumka Mix)"
4. "Hronia Polla (Valentino Remix)"
5. "Tasis Aftoktonias (The Bombay Remix by Elias Pantazopoulos)"
