= Back to Time (Complete EMI Years) =

Compilation album by Anna Vissi
- Released: 10 October 2007
- Genre: Modern Laika, pop, dance, blues
- Label: EMI/Capitol Original Masters

Anna Vissi chronology
Anna Vissi (a Best Of album) (1999)	Back to Time (Complete EMI Years) (2007)	The Essential Anna Vissi (2007)

Back to Time (Complete EMI Years) is a compilation album by Greek singer Anna Vissi, including the whole recordings which are now back catalogue items of Minos EMI. It is part of Minos EMI's special edition "EMI Years" compilations of early recordings by artists which were either signed to them directly or of releases which have since become part of their back catalogue.

The recordings include most of her recordings under her signings with Minos (1974–1978), a company which was bought out by EMI to form Minos EMI in the 1990s, and Columbia EMI Greece (1978–1982).

== Track listing ==
=== Disc 1 ===
1. "Oso Eho Foni (Revival Mix)" (As long as I have a voice (Revival Mix))
2. "Aftos Pou Perimeno" (He who wait (Anna's Dream Mix))
3. "Kalimera Kenouria Mou Agapi" (Good morning my new love)
4. "Poso S' Agapo" (How much I love you)
5. "Horis Esena Ego Den Kano" (I don't do without you)
6. "Thelo Mono Esena" (I only want you)
7. "Tha Borousa" (I could)
8. "Einai Stigmes" (There are moments)
9. "Ta Matia Ta Dika Mou" (The eyes of my own)
10. "Den Eimai Monahi (Where Are You Going?)" (I'm not alone)
11. "Oso Eho Foni (Album Version)" (As long as I have a voice)
12. "Aftos Pou Perimeno (Album Version)" (He who wait)
13. "Mi Stenahoriese Ki Ehi O Theos" (Don't worry and have a God)
14. "Kitrino Galazio Ke Menexedi" (Yellow, blue and lilac)
15. "Methismeni Politia" (Drunk state)
16. "Autostop" (Anna Vissi & Epikouri)" (Hitchhiking)
17. "Aftos Pou Perimeno (Dream In The House Mix)" (He who wait (Dream In The House Mix))
18. "Oso Eho Foni (Club Mix)" (As long as I have a voice (Club Mix))

=== Disc 2 ===
1. "Mono I Agapi (Love Is A Lonely Weekend)" (Only love)
2. "To Xero Tha 'rthis Xana (Woman In Love)" (I know you'll come again)
3. "Ma Itan Psemata (it:Un pò di più)" (But it was a lie)
4. "Hanome" (I get lost)
5. "Xehase Me (La Bohème)" (Forget me)
6. "Se Lipame" (I feel sorry for you)
7. "Kles Esi Kai Pono (Je reviens te chercher)" (You cry and I feel pain)
8. "Ma De Fovame" (But I'm not afraid)
9. "Milise Mou" (Talk to me)
10. "Vres Ton Tropo" (Find a way)
11. "Agapi Mou" (My love)
12. "An Toulahiston" (If at least)
13. "M' Agapas" (You love me)
14. "Krivame Tin Agapi Mas" (We hide our love)
15. "S' Agapo" (I love you)
16. "Dipsasa Stin Porta Sou" (I'm thirsty at your door)
17. "Yia Tin Agapi Pes Mou" (Tell me about love)
18. "Paramithi Xehasmeno" (Forgotten fairytale)

=== Disc 3 ===
1. "Ela Na Zisoume" (Come to live)
2. "Xanazo" (I live again)
3. "Yi Afto Sou Leo Mi" (That's why I tell you no)
4. "Ti Me Rotas" (What are you asking me?)
5. "Na I Zoi" (To life)
6. "M' Agapouses Kapou Kapou" (Sometimes you loved me)
7. "Kegete O Kosmos, Kegete" (The world is burned, burned)
8. "Ti Ta Thelis Lipon" (So what do you want?)
9. "Diskolos Keros" (Difficult time)
10. "Ki Esi Milas" (And you speak)
11. "Tote Tha Figo" (Then I'll leave)
12. "Yiati Gelas" (Why are you laughing?)
13. "Oute Ena S' Agapo" (Not even one "I love you")
14. "San Ta Pinasmena Peristeria" (Like hungry pigeons)
15. "O, Maria" (Oh! Maria)
16. "O Kirios Nobel" (Mr. Nobel)
17. "Nikisame" (We won)
18. "To Etos Tou Pediou" (The year of the child)

=== Disc 4 ===
1. "As Kanoume Apopse Mia Arhi" (Let's make a start tonight)
2. "Agapise Me" (Love me)
3. "Na 'mouna Sta Heria Sou Karavi" (I was in the hands of your boat)
4. "I Kiklades" (The Cyclades)
5. "I Nikimeni Imaste Emis" (We are the losers)
6. "Mi Vazis Mavro" (Don't put black)
7. "Kladi Rodias" (Branch of pomegranate)
8. "Apo 'do Ki Apo 'ki" (From here and from there)
9. "Sou 'dosa Na Piis" (I gave you to drink)
10. "Gia Sas Triadafilla" (Hello roses)
11. "I Agapi Sou Sholio" (Your school love)
12. "To Tali-bo"
13. "Ilie Mou" (My sun)
14. "To Palio T' Aeroplano" (The old plane)
15. "Savvatiatika" (On a Saturday)
16. "To Palikari" (The stalwart)
17. "Mia Mikri Psihoula" (A little soul)
18. "Thelo" (I want)
19. "Krasi, Thalassa Kai T' Agori Mou" (Wine, sea and my boyfriend)
20. "Ego Eimai Ego" (It's me, me)

=== Credits and personnel ===
Personnel

- Charles Aznavour - music
- Sergio Bardotti - music
- Gilbert François Becaud - music
- Akos Daskalopoulos (alias: M. Korfiatis) - lyrics
- P. Delanoe - music
- Daniel Deschenes - music
- Manos Eleftheriou - lyrics
- Panos Falaras - lyrics
- Doros Georgiadis - music, lyrics, vocals
- G. Gerasimidis - music, lyrics
- Barry Gibbs - music
- Robin Gibbs - music
- Christos Gkartzos - music
- Giorgos Hadjinasios - music
- Dimitris Iatropoulos - lyrics
- Ioannis Kalamitsis - lyrics
- Giorgos Kanellopoulos - lyrics
- Tasos Karakatsanis - music
- Giorgos Katsaros - music
- Nikos Karvelas (alias: Nikos Leonardos) - music, lyrics
- Stavros Kougioumtzis - music, lyrics
- Charles Pierre Leroyer - music
- K. Loïzos - music
- Αlice Maywood - music
- Kostis Palamas - lyrics
- Polydoros - lyrics
- Manolis Mikelis - music
- Dimos Moutsis- music
- Takis Mpougas - music
- Philippos Nikolaou - music, lyrics
- Spiros Papavasiliou- music
- Yiannis Parios - lyrics
- Jacques Plante - music
- Pythagoras - lyrics
- Marianna Sakari - music, lyrics
- Norman David Shapiro - music
- Yiannis Spanos - music
- Lakis Teäzis - lyrics
- Barbara Tsimboulis - lyrics
- Sotia Tsotou - lyrics
- Giorgos Tzavaras - music
- Nikos Tzavaras - music
- Antonis Vardis - music, guitars
- Anna Vissi - vocals, music, lyrics
- Spiros Vlassopoulos - music

Production

- Giorgos Tsambras - compilation, introductory note
- Christos Hadjistamou - digital remastering at Athens Mastering Studio

Design

- Petros Paraschis - cover design, artwork

== Chart performance ==
When the collection was released in October 2007, it peaked at position 34. 5 years later, in October 2012 it was re-released in a new box, with a cheaper price and the album re-entered the Greek charts with a new peak at number 8 (week 43 of the year 2012). The following week the album moved up a position, creating a new peak, at number 7.

Chart	Peak Position	Certification
Greek Albums Chart	7	-
