= Anna Vissi (1999 album) =

Compilation album by Anna Vissi
- Released: 1999
- Recorded: 1994–1998
- Genre: Pop, dance, modern laika
- Label: Sony Music/Columbia
- Producer: Nikos Karvelas

Anna Vissi chronology
Ta Prota Mou Tragoudia (My First Songs -Best Of 1974-1981) (1993)	Anna Vissi (1999)	Back To Time (Complete EMI Years) (2007)

Anna Vissi is the self-titled album by Greek singer Anna Vissi, released in countries outside Greece in 1999 by Sony Music Entertainment, in order to promote the artist on an international level. This compilation included songs from her multi-platinum-selling albums in Greece, such as Antidoto, Klima Tropiko and Re!.

== Track listing ==
1. "Re!" (from album Re!)
2. "To Allo Mou Ego" (from album Re!)
3. "Gi'Alla" (from album Antidoto)
4. "Magava Tout" (from album Antidoto)
5. "Erotevmenaki" (from album Antidoto)
6. "I Varka" (from album Re!)
7. "Horevo" (from album Klima Tropiko)
8. "Ime Poly Kala" (Dance Mix) (from album Re!)
9. "30 Ke Vale" (from album Re!)
10. "Pali Gia Sena" (from album Antidoto)
11. "Mou Anikis" (from album Antidoto)
12. "O Ponos Tis Agapis" (from album Antidoto)
13. "Antidoto" (from album Antidoto)
