= Forgive Me This =

Single by Anna Vissi

from the album Everything I Am
- Released: 8 August 1997
- Recorded: 1997
- Genre: Pop, country, modern laika
- Label: Epic
- Songwriter(s): Ric Wake, Nikos Karvelas
- Producer(s): Ric Wake, Nikos Karvelas

Anna Vissi singles chronology
"Amin" (1995)	"Forgive Me This" (1997)	"The Remixes" (1997)

"Forgive Me This" is a rare single released only in Australia by Cypriot pop singer Anna Vissi on 8 August 1997. The single featured "Forgive Me This" which later appeared on her international album Everything I Am, as well as the rare track "Crush" released only on this single. The single also featured two Greek hits, "Mavra Gialia" and "Eleni", from her Greek language studio albums Travma and Re! respectively.

== Music video ==
The music video of "Forgive Me This" features Vissi and a man playing in a field of flowers. In some scenes, Vissi is alone or lying down on a flower bed.

== Track listing ==
1. "Forgive Me This"
2. "Crush"
3. "Mavra Gialia" (Black sunglasses)
4. "Eleni" (Helen)

== Charts ==
Chart performance for "Forgive Me This"
Chart (1997)	Peak position
Australia (ARIA)	66
