= Eimai Poli Kala =

Single by Anna Vissi

from the album Re!
- B-side: "I Varka"
- Released: 1995
- Recorded: 1995
- Genre: Modern Laika
- Label: Sony Music Greece/Columbia
- Songwriter: Nikos Karvelas
- Producer: Nikos Karvelas

Anna Vissi singles chronology
"Mono I Agapi" / "Love Is A Lonely Weekend" (1982)	"Eimai Poli Kala" (1995)	"Min Ksehnas" (1995)

"Eimai Poli Kala" is a rare single released by Greek pop singer Anna Vissi in 1995. The single featured "Eimai Poli Kala" in three versions and the song "I Varka", which had already appeared on her popular album Re!.

== Track listing ==
1. "Eimai Poli Kala" (Dance Mix) (I'm doing fine (Dance Mix))
2. "Eimai Poli Kala" (Cool Mix) (I'm doing fine (Cool Mix))
3. "I Varka" (Radio Edit) (The boat (Edit))
4. "Eimai Poli Kala" (Album Version) (I'm doing fine (Album Version))
