= Agapi Ipervoliki =

Agapi ipervoliki Αγάπη υπερβολική

EP by Anna Vissi
- Released: 15 July 2000
- Studio: Air studio Echo studio
- Genre: Pop, dance, modern laika
- Length: 29:06
- Language: Greek
- Label: Sony Music Greece; Columbia
- Producer: Nikos Karvelas

Anna Vissi chronology
The Remixes (1997)	Agapi ipervoliki Αγάπη υπερβολική (2000)	Everything I Am (2000)

Singles from Agapi ipervoliki
- 1. "Agapi ipervoliki" Released: July 2000; 2. "De me agapas" Released: August 2000; 3. "Kaka paidia" Released: September 2000; 4. "Ola ta lefta" Released: October 2000

Agapi ipervoliki (Greek: Αγάπη Υπερβολική; English: Excessive love) is an EP (CD single) by the Cypriot singer Anna Vissi. It was released on 15 July 2000 by Sony Music Greece and received quadruple-platinum certification for the sale of 100,000 units, prior to the album Kravgi's release. It was Vissi's most successful release to this point in Greece and Greece's fourth most successful CD single ever.

== Tracklist ==
All tracks are written by Nikos Karvelas

No.	Title	Length
1.	"Agapi ipervoliki" (Αγάπη υπερβολική; Excessive love)	4:50
2.	"Epilogi mou" (Επιλογή µου; My choice)	4:08
3.	"De me agapas" (Δε µε αγαπάς; You don't love me)	4:56
4.	"Afti ti fora" (Αυτή τη φορά; This time)	6:15
5.	"Kaka paidia" (Κακά παιδιά; Bad guys)	5:10
6.	"Ola ta lefta" (Όλα τα λεφτά; All the money)	3:47
Total length:		29:06

== Singles ==
The following singles were officially released to radio stations, some of them with music videos, and gained airplay. "Agapi Ipervoliki" was voted as the eighth best video in MAD's Countdown Top 40 Best Videos in 10 Mad Years on 1 January 2007.

1. "Agapi ipervoliki"
2. "De me agapas"
3. "Kaka paidia"
4. "Ola ta lefta"

== Credits ==
Credits adapted from liner notes.

=== Personnel ===
- Manos Govatzidakis – programming (3)
- Nikos Karvelas – orchestration (1, 2, 3, 4, 5, 6) / keyboards (1, 2) / drums (6) / guitars, percussion, dulcimer (5)
- Takis Kouvatseas – drums (4, 5)
- Yiannis Lionakis – guitars (4, 5, 6) / bouzouki (3, 6) / baglama (6)
- Kostas Miliotakis – keyboards (3, 4, 5, 6)
- Panayiotis Moshovoudis – bass (4, 5)
- Christos Olympios – bouzouki (5) / cura (4)
- Martin Right – programming (1, 2)
- Anna Vissi – backing vocals (1)

=== Production ===
- Thodoris Chrisanthopoulos (Fabelsound) – mastering
- Rupert Coulson – sound engineer, mix engineer (4, 5)
- Manos Govatzidakis – sound engineer (3, 6) / mix engineer (2–8)
- Ricky Graham – sound engineer (4, 5)
- Nikos Karvelas – production manager / mix engineer's assistant (4, 5)
- Michie Katsani – artwork
- Christos Kosmas – sound engineer, mix engineer (3, 6)
- Yiannis Lionakis – mix engineer's assistant (4, 5)
- Leonardo Orfanidis – art direction
- Peter Petrohilos – make up
- Panos Pitsilidis – art direction
- Neale Ricotti – sound engineer's assistant (4, 5)
- Martin Right – sound engineer, mix engineer (1, 2)
- Fernando Torrent – hair styling
- Gilles-Marie Zimmermann – photographer

== Charts ==
Chart (2000)	Peak position	Certification
Cypriot Albums (All Records Top 20)	1	4×Platinum
Greek Albums (IFPI Greece)	1	4×Platinum
