= Amin (song) =

Single by Anna Vissi

from the album Re!
- Released: 1995
- Recorded: 1995
- Genre: Pop, dance, Modern Laika
- Label: Sony Music Greece/Columbia
- Songwriter(s): Nikos Karvelas
- Producer(s): Nikos Karvelas

Anna Vissi singles chronology
"Min Ksehnas" (1995)	"Amin" (1995)	"Forgive Me This" (1997)

"Amin" (Greek: Αμήν; English: Amen) is a single released by Greek pop singer Anna Vissi in 1995. The single featured "Amin" which later appeared on the repackaged edition of her popular album Re!, as well as the track "Eleni", which Anna Vissi dedicated to her fan Eleni Karkanta. Music and lyrics for both tracks are by Nikos Karvelas.

== Track listing ==
1. "Amin" (Αμήν; Amen) - 4:24
2. "Eleni" (Ελένη; Helen) - 4:54
