= Mala Mala =

Mala Mala may refer to:

- Mala Mala Airport, airport at Mala Mala, South Africa
- Mala Mala Game Reserve, a game reserve located within the Sabi Sand Game Reserve, Mpumalanga province, South Africa
- Mala Mala (film), 2014 Puerto Rican documentary film
