= Agapi Einai Esi (song) =

Single by Anna Vissi

from the album Agapi Einai Esi
- Released: 9 October 2010
- Recorded: 2010
- Genre: Pop rock, dance-pop
- Length: 4:11
- Label: Sony Music Entertainment Greece
- Songwriter: Nikos Karvelas
- Producers: Nikos Karvelas, Alex Papaconstantinou, Ali Payami

Anna Vissi singles chronology
"Fabulous" (2009)	"Agapi Einai Esi" (2010)

"Agapi Einai Esi" (Greek: Αγάπη Είναι Εσύ; English: Love is you) is a song released by Greek singer Anna Vissi. The song serves as the first single from her album of the same name and was released to radio stations on 9 October 2010. It was also included on a promotional CD single of the same name released as a covermount with newspaper RealNews on 24 October 2010. The release marks the first time in four years that has Vissi has collaborated with former husband Nikos Karvelas.

== Background ==
It was first reported in September 2010 that Anna Vissi was working with previous long-time collaborator and former husband Nikos Karvelas on songs for her forthcoming album. The song marks Vissi's first collaboration with Karvelas in four years. Speaking to the magazine Life & Style, Vissi stated that she had a desire to work with Karvelas once more, while he also felt the same way. She further stated that she felt they were made for each other artistically.

== Release and promotion ==
"Agapi Einai Esi", was released on 9 October 2010 through newspaper Real News' website and sequentially to all radio stations. On 24 October 2010, a promotional CD single was released as a covermount with Real News containing the song as well as two other new songs. The song was also later released as a digital download on 29 October 2010.

=== Reception ===
Upon release, title track "Agapi Einai Esi" received mixed criticism. Most negative feedback came concerning its lyrical content and the metaphors used to describe love, while Vissi's most loyal fans were left disappointed, expecting something better to come out of a long-awaited Vissi and Karvelas collaboration. In a radio interview with Real FM, Vissi responded to the criticism, stating that she fell in love with the song upon first listen, and that it represents the way she would speak about love. She further went on to state that what ever Karvelas writes never passes by unnoticed. Lakis Lazopoulos also made fun of the lyrics during his highly popular weekly satire show Al Tsantiri News in October 2010.

== Music video ==
A teaser for the music video, directed by Christine Crokos, was released on 6 December 2010. The music video was released on 14 December 2010, and is heavily based on computer-generated imagery. The full version of the video includes a prelude lasting one minute and forty seconds, making it almost six minutes long in total.

== Live performances ==
The first live performance of the song was made at the premiere of Vissi's Face2Face concert series on 15 October at Athens Arena. It was sung during her solo setlist, which opened the night.

== Release history ==
Region	Date	Label	Format
Greece	9 October 2010	Sony Music Entertainment Greece	Radio single
Austria	29 October 2010	Sony Music Entertainment Greece	Digital download
Belgium	29 October 2010	Sony Music Entertainment Greece	Digital download
Finland	29 October 2010	Sony Music Entertainment Greece	Digital download
France	29 October 2010	Sony Music Entertainment Greece	Digital download
Germany	29 October 2010	Sony Music Entertainment Greece	Digital download
Greece	29 October 2010	Sony Music Entertainment Greece	Digital download
Italy	29 October 2010	Sony Music Entertainment Greece	Digital download
Netherlands	29 October 2010	Sony Music Entertainment Greece	Digital download
Spain	29 October 2010	Sony Music Entertainment Greece	Digital download
United Kingdom	29 October 2010	Sony Music Entertainment Greece	Digital download
