= Sinentefxi =

Sinentefxi Συνέντευξη

Studio album by Anna Vissi
- Released: 30 November 2015
- Recorded: May – August 2015
- Genre: Contemporary laïko, pop rock, dance-pop
- Length: 59:58
- Label: Panik Gold
- Producer: Nikos Karvelas, Anna Vissi, Carlos E.Perez

Anna Vissi chronology
Agapi Einai Esi (2010)	Sinentefxi; Συνέντευξη (2015)	Iliotropia (2019)

Singles from Sinentefxi
- 1. "Gia Sena" Released: 12 October 2015; 2. "Xana Mana" Released: 19 January 2016; 3. "Sinentefxi" Released: 17 July 2016; 4. "Protimo Na Petheno" Released: 12 September 2016

Sinentefxi (Greek: Συνέντευξη; English: Interview) is Greek singer Anna Vissi's 27th studio album, released in Greece and Cyprus in November 2015 by Panik Gold. It is Vissi's first studio album since 2010. The first Single is called "Gia Sena" with music and lyrics by Nikos Karvelas. The album was certified Platinum in both Greece and Cyprus.

== Release ==
The album "Sinentefxi" was released on Monday, 30 November 2015 featuring 14 new songs. All songs were composed by Nikos Karvelas, while lyrics were provided by Karvelas and Gerasimos Evangelatos (in four songs).

In 2019, the album was selected for inclusion in the Panik Gold box set The Legendary Recordings 1982-2019. The release came after Panik's acquisition rights of Vissi's back catalogue from her previous record company Sony Music Greece. This box set was printed on a limited edition of 500 copies containing CD releases of all of her albums from 1982 to 2019 plus unreleased material.

== Promotion ==
The weekend before the release of the album, major radio stations in Cyprus and Greece held an "Anna Vissi Weekend" previewing exclusively the new songs. During this weekend, the uptempo track Xana Mana was confirmed as the second single off the album.

== Track listing ==
No.	Title	Writer(s)	Length
1.	"Sinentefxi" (Συνέντευξη; Interview)	Nikos Karvelas, Gerasimos Evangelatos	5:04
2.	"Gia Sena" (Για Σένα; For You)	Karvelas	5:04
3.	"Xana Mana" (Ξανά Μανά; Once Again)	Karvelas	4:53
4.	"Kalytera Moni" (Καλύτερα Μόνη; I'd Be Better Off Alone)	Karvelas, Evangelatos	3:58
5.	"Xoris Ta Psemata" (Χωρίς Τα Ψέματα; Without Lies)	Karvelas	4:04
6.	"Protimo Na Petheno" (Προτιμώ Να Πεθαίνω; I Prefer Dying)	Karvelas	4:12
7.	"Triplos Kafes" (Τριπλός Καφές; Triple Dose Coffee)	Karvelas	3:11
8.	"Veranta" (Βεράντα; Veranda)	Karvelas	5:26
9.	"Lathos Strofi" (Λάθος Στροφή; Wrong Turn)	Karvelas	4:21
10.	"Xorista" (Χωριστά; Apart)	Karvelas	4:17
11.	"Toumpa" (Τούμπα; Upside Down)	Karvelas	3:26
12.	"Ase Tous Erotes" (Άσε Τους Έρωτες; Leave All The Loves)	Karvelas, Evangelatos	4:26
13.	"Axoristoi - Give In To Me" (Αχώριστοι; Inseparables; Duet with Nikolas Raptakis)	Billy Falcon, Rose Falcon, Elisha Hoffman, Evangelatos	3:17
14.	"Tis Psixis Ta Antisomata" (Της Ψυχής Τα Αντισώματα; The Antibodies Of The Soul)	Karvelas	4:15
Total length:			59:58

== Charts ==
The album charted to number 1 of both Cyprus' and Greece's i-tunes charts based only on the pre-orders, and has also entered the top 100 in Spain.

Originally record company Panik Records were not members of the IFPI Greece and their albums, including "Sinentefxi", were not included on the official Greek IFPI albums charts (that counts physical retail shipments). Panik became member of IFPI Greece at the beginning of 2016, and "Sinentefxi" made its debut on the charts more than a month after its release. It has eventually peaked at number 4

Chart	Peak position
Greek Albums Chart (IFPI Greece)	4

== Awards ==
The album won "Album Of the Year" at the Super Music Awards 2016 in Cyprus. In June 2016 she presented the hit "Xana Mana" as well as the new single and title track "Sinentefxi" on the MAD Video Music Awards 2016 where she received award for her contribution to the music industry the past forty years.

The album was certified Platinum in both Greece and Cyprus.

== Athens Show and Summer Tour ==
Anna Vissi made a series of shows in Athens in Hotel Ermou between December 2015 April 2016 making a program based on the album with the musicians that contributed in it. Her appearances in Hotel Ermou were the most successful in Athens for the year In June 2016 she embarked on a hugely successful summer tour visiting 15 cities in Greece and Cyprus. The show continued for two more years at the same venue named "Hotel Ermou 2" and "Hotel Ermou 3" respectively
