= Ann Winsborn =

Swedish artist, singer and songwriter (born 1981)

- Born: 5 July 1981 (age 45); Malmö, Sweden
- Occupations: Singer, songwriter

Ann Winsborn (born 5 July 1981 in Malmö, Sweden) is a Swedish singer and songwriter.

Winsborn debuted in 2002 with the song "Everything I Do", and her second single "Be The One" was released the same year. Her debut album Everything I Am was released in 2003 along with her third single "Je n'ai pas compris". Her second album Pink-Collar-Crime was released in 2005, as was her fourth single "La La Love on My Mind" (written by Bobby Ljunggren and Ingela Forsman). A Chinese version of "La La Love on My Mind" is "La la ai" (拉拉爱) was sung by Rainy Shao (邵雨涵).

The song "Everything I Do" placed on several dance lists in Europe, and so did her second single "Be The One". In Poland, her third single "Je n'ai pas compris" was one of the most played song of the year in 2004, and her debut album went gold there as well.

Winsborn sings in both English and French. For example, she sings partly in French in the song "Je n'ai pas compris" and partly in French in her second album. Winsborn also recorded the song "Kärlekens makt" in Swedish in 2012.

After eight years from her latest single, and fifteen years from her latest studio album "Pink Collar Crime", Ann Winsborn came back with a new single "Solen dansar i ditt hår" which was released 9 May 2020.

== Discography ==
=== Albums ===
- Everything I Am (2003)
- Pink-Collar-Crime (2005)

=== Singles ===
Year	Title	Chart positions			Album
Year	Title	SWE	FIN	POL	Album
2002	"Everything I Do"	—	—	5	Everything I Am
2002	"Be The One"	—	—	—	Everything I Am
2003	"Je n'ai pas compris"	—	—	2	Everything I Am
2005	"La La Love on My Mind"	54	10	—	Pink-Collar-Crime
