= Everything (Anna Vissi song) =

2006 single by Anna Vissi

Single by Anna Vissi

from the album Nylon Euro Edition
- Released: April 2006
- Recorded: 2006
- Studio: Bi Kay Studios
- Genre: Pop rock
- Length: 3:00 (Original Version)
- Label: Sony BMG Greece/Columbia
- Songwriters: Nikos Karvelas; Anna Vissi
- Producer: Nikos Karvelas

Anna Vissi singles chronology
"Call Me" (2005)	"Everything" (2006)	"To Parelthon Mou" (2008)

Eurovision Song Contest 2006 entry
- Country: Greece
- Artist: Anna Vissi
- Language: English
- Composer: Nikos Karvelas
- Lyricist: Anna Vissi

Finals performance
- Final result: 9th
- Final points: 128

Entry chronology
- ◄ "My Number One" (2005)
- "Yassou Maria" (2007) ►

Official performance video
- "Everything (Final) on YouTube

Alternative cover
- Cover of the promotional release for "Everything", noting its status as the Greek Eurovision entry.

"Everything" is a song recorded by Greek Cypriot singer Anna Vissi, written by Nikos Karvelas and Vissi herself. It is best known as the Greek entry at the Eurovision Song Contest 2006, held in Athens.

== At Eurovision ==
The song is an anthemic ballad sung in English by Anna Vissi, who is an established performer in Greece and her home country, Cyprus, and who has represented both countries previously in the Contest; first with "Autostop" for Greece in The Hague in 1980, finishing 13th, and the second time for Cyprus in Harrogate in 1982 with "Mono i agapi", one of three Cypriot entries to finish 5th.

"Everything" was performed sixteenth on the night, following the United Kingdom's Daz Sampson with "Teenage Life" and preceding Finland's Lordi with "Hard Rock Hallelujah". Unusually, particularly in comparison to other contest entries, it was performed solo by Vissi, without the presence of backing singers or dancers. Lyrically, the song deals with Vissi's conflicted emotions on ending a relationship. She sings that she is "still in love with everything I hate".

It finished in 9th position with 128 points.

== After Eurovision ==
The song has had a successful commercial release in Greece and in Cyprus, becoming a number 1 hit in both countries and achieving Gold status in Greece. It has also achieved success in Sweden, reaching number 26 at top 60 during the week of 10 August 2006. The video for "Everything" has a "heartbreak" theme in keeping with the tone of the song and features the artist discovering her partner's infidelity and suffering a series of misfortunes before being reconciled with him.

== Track listing ==
1. "Everything" (Original Version)
2. "Everything" (Valentino Remix)

== Music video and criticism ==
The music video's protagonist, played by the singer, discovers that her boyfriend is cheating on her. She leaves the hotel, kicks parked cars and leaves. Her purse is stolen out of her convertible by a thief on a motorbike, and she leaves a gas station without paying to chase after him. She is then pursued by the police and arrested, but escapes and hitchhikes a lorry the driver of which feels her leg.

Resembling a road movie, the music video was criticized for displaying negativity with regard to Greece. Greek politician Georgios Karatzaferis criticized the video as "defamatory to Greece" in a speech in the European Parliament. More specifically, Karatzaferis argued that the video harmed the country's reputation in the eyes of future tourists, and that was reason enough for the European Parliament to hold an inquiry into the matter. No such inquiry was planned or ever undertaken.

== Cover versions ==
The song was covered by Conchita Wurst in the final of the Austrian talent show Starmania 2007. Wurst performed it under his real name Tom Neuwirth. Wurst would later have the good fortune of performing the song as a duet with Vissi herself during Vissi's 40th Anniversary concert in July 2014—two months after winning the Eurovision Song Contest—in Copenhagen.

== Charts ==
Chart (2006)	Peak position
Greek Singles Chart	1
Swedish Singles Chart	26

== See also ==
- Greece in the Eurovision Song Contest
