= Everything I Am (Anna Vissi song) =

2000 single by Anna Vissi

Single by Anna Vissi

from the album Everything I Am
- Released: 2000
- Recorded: 2000
- Genre: Pop, Dance
- Label: Sony Music Greece/Columbia
- Songwriters: Nikos Karvelas, Paul Barry

Anna Vissi singles chronology
"Agapi Ipervoliki" (2000)	"Everything I Am" (2000)	"Still in Love with You" (2001)

Alternative cover
- Dutch cover

"Everything I Am" is the first single from Cypriot pop singer Anna Vissi's debut English-language album Everything I Am, which was released in the summer of 2000.

== Track listing ==
1. "Everything I Am" (Original)
2. "Everything I Am" (Almighty Mix)
3. "Everything I Am" (Eiffel 65 Remix)
4. "Everything I Am" (Groove Brothers Remix)
5. "Moro Mou" (No Tomorrow)

== Charts ==
Chart	Peak position	Certification
Greek Singles Chart	1	Platinum
Cypriot Singles Chart	1	4xPlatinum
