= Everything I Am (album) =

Studio album by Anna Vissi
- Released: October 23, 2000
- Recorded: 1995–2000
- Genre: Pop
- Length: 47:19
- Language: English
- Label: Columbia
- Producer: Walter Turbitt, Peter Asher, Graham Stack, Brian Rawling, Peter Zizzo, Ric Wake

Anna Vissi chronology
Antidoto (1998)	Everything I Am (2000)	Kravgi (2000)

Everything I Am is the title of the debut English-language album by Cypriot singer Anna Vissi. It was created under Vissi's affiliation with Sony Music Entertainment international who granted her collaboration with successful American songwriters and producers. However, the album was never officially released in the United States after Sony Music Entertainment decided to withdraw from supporting Vissi's global career expansion. The album was subsequently first released in Greece and Cyprus on October 24, 2000, by Columbia Records. This album, along with Greek-language and commercially successful album Kravgi released the same year, showcased a significant change over Vissi's stylistic and musical selections, expanding her image as a pop icon and contemporary artist as promoted in the mid-1990s and onwards. The album was certified gold in Greece, and platinum in Cyprus.

== Album information ==
=== Release ===
The album was released internationally in select countries through Sony Music Entertainment Netherlands, the branch which also housed the Sony Music Entertainment international office who commissioned the album, and in countries like Japan and Australia where it was promoted in those markets. However the album and singles failed to attract mainstream success.

In 2019, the album was selected for inclusion in the Panik Gold box set The Legendary Recordings 1982-2019. The release came after Panik's acquisition rights of Vissi's back catalogue from her previous record company Sony Music Greece. This box set was printed on a limited edition of 500 copies containing CD releases of all of her albums from 1982 to 2019 plus unreleased material.

=== Music ===
The album features the participation of a number of notable pop music producers and songwriters. They include Nikos Karvelas, Paul Berry, Mark Taylor, Graham Stack, Paul Stanley, Vini Poncia, Steve Torch, Russ Ballard, Tina Shafer, Julian Harris, Danielle Gerber and David Campbell.

=== Covers ===
The album contained three cover versions of tracks originally or later recorded by other artists. "On A Night Like This" was originally recorded by Swedish artist Pandora for her 1999 album No Regrets and later recorded by Kylie Minogue in late 2000 for her album Light Years. "So In Love with Yourself" was originally recorded by Dannii Minogue in 1997 for her album Girl. I Was Made For Lovin' You was originally recorded by the band Kiss. "No More the Fool" was originally recorded by Elkie Brooks.

=== Music Videos ===
"Everything I Am" was released in 2000 as a promotional video, airing in a wide range of TV stations around the world. Its release was preceded by "Forgive Me This" music video, shot in 1997, initially for the Australian market where it was released as a single.

In 2001, both videos were selected for digital release on Vissi's The Video Collection.

== Track listing ==
1. "Still in Love with You"
2. "Kick the Habit"
3. "Everything I Am"
4. "So in Love with Yourself"
5. "Way Out"
6. "I Was Made for Lovin' You"
7. "On a Night like This"
8. "After You"
9. "Supernatural Love"
10. "No More the Fool"
11. "Moro Mou (No Tomorrow)" (My baby (No tomorrow))
12. "Forgive Me This"

== Singles ==
1. "Forgive Me This"
2. "Everything I Am"
3. "Still in Love with You"
4. "On a Night like This"

=== Music videos ===
- "Forgive Me This"
- "Everything I Am"

== Credits and personnel ==
Ivy Skoff- production coordination

Lisa Greene- production coordination

Peter Asher- production direction

Stewart Whitmore- digital edit

Stephen Marcussen- digital mastering

Qd- artwork, design

Corinne Day- photography

Credits adapted from the album's liner notes.

== Charts ==
Chart	Peak position	Certification
Greek Albums Chart	1	Gold
Cypriot Album Chart	1	Platinum
