= Autostop (Anna Vissi and the Epikouri song) =

1980 song by Anna Vissi and the Epikouri

Single by Anna Vissi and the Epikouri
- Language: Greek
- Released: 1980
- Label: Columbia
- Composer: Jick Nacassian
- Lyricist: Rony Sofu

Eurovision Song Contest 1980 entry
- Country: Greece
- Artist: Anna Vissi
- With: The Epikouri
- Language: Greek
- Composer: Jick Nacassian
- Lyricist: Rony Sofu

Finals performance
- Final result: 13th
- Final points: 30

Entry chronology
- ◄ "Sokrati" (1979)
- "Feggari kalokerino" (1981) ►

"Autostop" (Greek: Ωτοστόπ; "Hitch-Hiking") is a song recorded by Greek-Cypriot group Anna Vissi and the Epikouri, with music composed by Jick Nacassian and Greek lyrics written by Rony Sofu. It represented Greece in the Eurovision Song Contest 1980 held in The Hague.

== Background ==
=== Conception ===
With music by Jick Nacassian and lyrics by Rony Sofu, "Autostop" is an up-tempo number about the tradition of hitch-hiking throughout Europe. The song suggests that it is the best way of seeing the world and sings that one can even go as far as China. The song is also memorable for the frequent repetition of the title, with the word being sung thirty-seven times.

=== Eurovision ===
On 10 March 1980, "Autostop" performed by Anna Vissi competed in the national final organised by the Hellenic Broadcasting Corporation (ERT) to select its song and performer for 25th edition of the Eurovision Song Contest. The song won the competition becoming the Greek entrant for Eurovision. The Epikouri, who accompanied Kostas Tournas in the national final, would accompany Vissi in Eurovision.

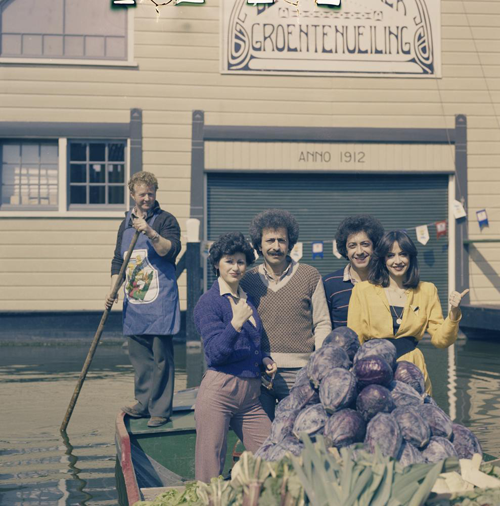
Anna Vissi and the Epikouri at the shooting for the Eurovision postcard.

On 19 April 1980, the Eurovision Song Contest was held at the Nederlands Congresgebouw in The Hague hosted by Nederlandse Omroep Stichting (NOS), and broadcast live throughout the continent. Anna Vissi and the Epikouri performed "Autostop" third out of the nineteen entries on the evening and followed Turkey's "Pet'r Oil" by Ajda Pekkan while preceding Luxembourg's "Papa Pingouin" by Sophie & Magaly. Jick Nakassian conducted the live orchestra in the performance of the Greek entry.

At the close of voting, the performance had received 30 points, placing thirteenth in a field of nineteen. It was succeeded as Greek representative at the 1981 contest by "Feggari Kalokerino" by Yiannis Dimitras. Vissi returned to the contest in 1982, then representing her native Cyprus with "Mono i agapi", and a third time in 2006 with "Everything", again singing for Greece.

=== Aftermath ===
"Autostop" and "Mono i agapi", that were never officially released on any of Vissi's studio albums, were remastered and released in February 2006 for promotion in a double A-side single titled "Autostop/Love Is a Lonely Weekend", prior to the release of Vissi's 2006 Eurovision entry.
