= Agapi Einai Esi =

Agapi Einai Esi Αγάπη Είναι Εσύ

Studio album by Anna Vissi
- Released: 17 December 2010
- Recorded: 2010
- Genre: Contemporary laïko, pop rock, dance-pop
- Length: 42:31
- Label: Sony Music Greece/Columbia
- Producer: Nikos Karvelas, Alex Papaconstantinou, Ali Payami, Giorgos Galanos, Anna Vissi

Anna Vissi chronology
Apagorevmeno (2008)	Agapi Einai Esi; Αγάπη Είναι Εσύ (2010)	Sinentefxi (2015)

Singles from Agapi Einai Esi
- 1. "Agapi Einai Esi" Released: 9 October 2010; 2. "Den Tha Iparksei Allo" Released: 10 December 2010; 3. "Ombrela" Released: March 2011

Agapi Einai Esi (Greek: Αγάπη Είναι Εσύ; English: Love Is You) is the 26th studio album by Greek recording artist Anna Vissi, released in Greece and Cyprus on 17 December 2010 by Sony Music Greece as a covermount with Real News. It is her first album since 2005's Nylon to be completely written by Nikos Karvelas, while it also serves as their first collaboration in four years. The album has so far generated the title track single and debuted at number six on the Greek IFPI Top 75 Albums chart, moved up to third place on its third week and went gold on the fourth week.

== Background ==
It was first reported in September 2010 that Anna Vissi was working with previous long-time collaborator Nikos Karvelas on songs for her forthcoming album. The CD single marks Vissi's first collaboration with Karvelas in four years. The album is mainly rock-oriented. Speaking to the magazine Life & Style, Vissi stated that she had a desire to work with Karvelas once more, while he also felt the same way. She further stated that she felt they were made for each other artistically. During an interview with Love Radio on 8 December 2010, Vissi announced the name of her new album, and revealed that it will be completely written by Nikos Karvelas containing ten songs. In December 2010, "Oasis" and "San To Nto Ke To Si" were also debuted on the radio. Vissi also stated that she would be covering a song titled "Vampir" (Vampire) off of Nikos Karvelas album Adio Heimona. A duet with Sakis Rouvas was also announced in the spring, with Karvelas being considered as the writer, although it apparently did not make it to the album.

== Release and promotion ==
The album was released on 17 December 2010 as a covermount with Real News. Traditionally, a Sunday edition newspaper, the issue was released two days early in a special Friday edition due to a planned 48-hour media strike over the weekend; it was originally due out on 19 December 2010. The album was scheduled to be available in retail stores in Greece and Cyprus on 22 December 2010.

=== "Agapi Einai Esi" (CD single) ===
Cover of the promotional CD single "Agapi Einai Esi"

For promotion of the album, Vissi released a 3–track promotional CD single as a covermount with Real News on 24 October 2010. The CD single was later also released digitally on 5 November 2010. Leading up to the release of the CD single, Vissi was interviewed by Real FM 97.8 on 21 October 2010, during which samples of the other two songs were played. At the time, "Agapi Einai Esi" had been heard.

No.	Title	Writer(s)	Producer(s)	Length
1.	"Agapi Einai Esi" (Αγάπη Είναι Εσύ; Love is you)	Nikos Karvelas	Alex Papaconstantinou, Nikos Karvelas, Ali Payami	4:06
2.	"Etsi Mono Axizei" (Έτσι Μόνο Αξίζει; Only worth it like this)	Nikos Karvelas	Giorgos Galanos	4:26
3.	"Proteraiotita" (Προτεραιότητα; Priority)	Nikos Karvelas	Nikos Karvelas, Anna Vissi	4:13
Total length:				12:45

In 2019, the album was selected for inclusion in the Panik Gold box set The Legendary Recordings 1982-2019. The release came after Panik's acquisition rights of Vissi's back catalogue from her previous record company Sony Music Greece. This box set was printed on a limited edition of 500 copies containing CD releases of all of her albums from 1982 to 2019 plus unreleased material.

== Reception ==
=== Initial reaction ===
Upon release, the title track received negative criticism for its lyrical content and metaphors about love, with even Vissi's most loyal fans having been left disappointed as they expected a better result from the long-awaited Karvelas reunion. Lakis Lazopoulos also made fun of the lyrics during his highly popular weekly satire show Al Tsantiri News in October 2010. Vissi has defended the song and suggested that it was a good example that anything Karvelas does, whether perceived good or bad, does not go unnoticed.

MAD TV conducted a poll for its readers about who would have the best album for the holiday season out of Vissi, Michalis Hatzigiannis, and Sakis Rouvas; Vissi and Hatzigiannis both tied with 31 per cent, while Rouvas won the poll with 36 per cent of the vote.

=== Commercial performance ===
During the 2008 financial crisis, it became common practice for Greek artists to release new studio albums prior to their retail release as covermounts in Sunday edition newspapers or magazines in order to increase exposure for both themselves and the print release. Vissi followed this tactic with Agapi Einai Esi; although she had previously distributed a reissue of her previous album and an extended play (EP) titled Agapi Einai Esi, she had never previously done so for a brand new album. The album was distributed with the nationwide newspaper Real News once again, on 17 December 2010. On that day, Real News was the fourth best selling newspaper in Greece with 96,570 copies sold, but a significant 44 per cent or 75,540 unit decrease from the previous week, although this edition was not distributed on the usual Sunday due to the media strike.

Two other high-profile artists, Sakis Rouvas and Michalis Hatzigiannis, released their albums, Parafora and To Kalitero Psema, within one and two weeks prior to Agapi Einai Esi, respectively. This triggered a sense of direct competition among the media, curious to which artist would ultimately have the best album. The retail version of Agapi Einai Esi debuted at number six on week 51 of the Greek IFPI Top 75 Albums chart, where it remained for a second week before moving up to third place on during its third week. During its fourth week on the chart, IFPI Greece certified the album gold. The album remained on the chart for seven straight weeks, and during its eighth week it dropped out of the Top 75.

== Track listing ==
No.	Title	Writer(s)	Producer(s)	Length
1.	"Agapi Einai Esi" (Αγάπη Είναι Εσύ; Love is you)	Nikos Karvelas	Alex Papaconstantinou, Karvelas, Ali Payami	4:06
2.	"Gia Ola Ftei O Theos" (Για Όλα Φταίει Ο Θεός; God is at fault for everything)	Karvelas	Karvelas, Papaconstantinou	4:35
3.	"Den Tha Iparksei Allo" (Δεν Θα Υπάρξει Άλλο; There won't be another)	Karvelas	Karvelas, Papaconstantinou	3:44
4.	"Vampir" (Βαμπίρ; Vampire)	Karvelas	Karvelas, Papaconstantinou	4:00
5.	"Oasi" (Όαση; Oasis)	Karvelas	Karvelas	4:12
6.	"Omprella" (Ομπρέλλα; Umbrella)	Karvelas	Karvelas, Papaconstantinou	4:21
7.	"San To Do Kai To Si" (Σαν Το Ντο Και Το Σι; Like Do and Si)	Karvelas	Karvelas, Papaconstantinou	4:10
8.	"Sta Krifa" (Στα Κρυφά; In secrecy)	Karvelas	Papaconstantinou	4:40
9.	"Etsi Mono Aksizi" (Έτσι Μόνο Αξίζει; Only worth it like this)	Karvelas	Giorgos Galanos	4:26
10.	"Protereotita" (Προτεραιότητα; Priority)	Karvelas	Karvelas, Anna Vissi	4:12

== Singles ==
"Agapi Einai Esi"

"Agapi Einai Esi" (Love is you) was released on 9 October 2010 through newspaper Real News' website, and sequentially to all radio stations. The single was also later released as a digital download in Greece and Cyprus on 29 October 2010, while it was also included on the promotional CD single. A music video for the song was released on 14 December 2010, directed by Christine Crokos.

"Den Tha Iparksei Allo"

Den Tha Ipraksei Allo, is the second single from the album. The song gained airplay as soon as the album was released and peaked at number 32 in Greece according to the official Billboard Greek Airplay Chart powered by MediaInspector and IFPI Greece in Greece, and peaked at top 10 in Cyprus. Although there were rumours that a video for the song was on plan, they turned to be false as no video was released after all.

"Ombrela"

Ombrela, was the third radio-single from the album by Sony Music. Vissi though, did not release a video for this song either, nor she promoted it, as by March she turned on other projects, probably disappointed by the poor reception of the album, thus the single did not have a chart success.

== Personnel ==
- Sofia Arkele – care
- Christine Crokos – photography
- Giorgos Galanos – mixing
- Nikos Karvelas – producer, all instruments, backing vocalist
- Giannis Kifonides – Producer, mixing
- Roula Koromila – backing vocalist
- Christos Olympios – bouzouki
- Annita Pania – backing vocalist
- Alex Papaconstantinou – mixing, producer, all instruments, backing vocalist
- Ali Payam – producer
- Panos Pitsilidis – art direction
- Anna Vissi – producer, vocals

== Charts and certifications ==
=== Charts ===
Chart	Peak position
Greek Albums Chart (IFPI Greece)	3

=== Certifications ===
Country	Certification
Greece	Gold

== Release history ==
Region	Date	Label	Format	Version
Greece	17 December 2010	Sony Music	CD	Standard (Real News)
Cyprus	17 December 2010	Sony Music	CD	Standard (Real News)
Greece	22 December 2010	Sony Music	CD	Standard (Retail)
Cyprus	22 December 2010	Sony Music	CD	Standard (Retail)
