= Still in Love with You (Anna Vissi song) =

"Still In Love With You"

Single by Anna Vissi

from the album Everything I Am
- Released: 2001
- Recorded: 2000
- Genre: Pop, Dance
- Label: Sony Music Greece/Columbia
- Songwriter(s): Mark Taylor, Graham Stack, Paul Barry

Anna Vissi singles chronology
"Everything I Am" (2000)	"Still In Love With You" (2001)	"Mala - I Mousiki Tou Anemou" (2001)

"Still In Love With You" is the second single from the international album Everything I Am by Cypriot singer Anna Vissi, which was released in early January 2001. This single featured the song "Still In Love With You", which became a hit in many European countries, especially the Netherlands. It was released in the United States on March 12, 2001.

== Track listing ==
1. "Still In Love With You" (Radio Edit)
2. "Still In Love With You" (Soda Club Radio Mix)
3. "Still In Love With You" (Soda Club Mix)
4. "Still In Love With You" (Soda Club TV track)

== Charts ==
Chart	Peak Position	Certification
Greek Singles Chart	20	-
