= X (Anna Vissi album) =

Studio album by Anna Vissi
- Released: October 9, 2002
- Recorded: 2002
- Genre: Laïko
- Label: Sony Music Greece/Columbia
- Producer: George De Angelis

Anna Vissi chronology
Kravgi (2000)	X (2002)	Paraksenes Eikones (2003)

Singles from X
- 1. "Tasis Aftoktonias"; 2. "Martirio"; 3. "Sinharitiria"; 4. "Pes To Xana"; 5. "Tifli Empistosini"; 6. "Se Zilevo"

X, a reference to the letter Chi in the Greek alphabet, is the name of a Greek album by singer Anna Vissi released 2002 in Greece and Cyprus by Sony Music Greece. The album reached 3× platinum in Greece and 3× platinum in Cyprus. It was also released in Turkey by Sony Music Turkey.

In 2019, the album was selected for inclusion in the Panik Gold box set The Legendary Recordings 1982-2019. The release came after Panik's acquisition rights of Vissi's back catalogue from her previous record company Sony Music Greece. This box set was printed on a limited edition of 500 copies containing CD releases of all of her albums from 1982 to 2019 plus unreleased material.

== Track listing ==
1. "Tasis Aftoktonias" (Suicidal tendencies)
2. "X"
3. "Se Zilevo" (I'm jealous of you)
4. "Martirio" (Duet with Yiannis Parios) (Martyrdom)
5. "Sinharitiria" (Congratulations)
6. "Pai Teliose" (It's over)
7. "Tifli Empistosini" (Blind trust)
8. "Ta Radiofona" (The radios)
9. "Ekplixi" (Surprise)
10. "Aipnies" (Insomnia)
11. "Pes To Xana" (Say it again)
12. "Hronia Polla" (Happy birthday)

== Music ==
Music and Lyrics are by Nikos Karvelas on all of the tracks except lyrics on track 4 (Natalia Germanou).

== Music videos ==
- "Tasis Aftoktonias"
- "Pes To Ksana"

== Singles ==
"Taseis Aftoktonias"

It was the lead single of her album X.

"Sinharitiria"

The second single of the album.

"Martirio" feat Yiannis Parios

The third single of the album.

"Pes To Xana"

It was the fourth single and second video of the album X.

"Tifli Empistosini (Remix)"

Taken from the EP "The Remixes"

"Se Zilevo (Remix)"

Another remix from "The Remixes" EP.

== Credits ==
Credits adapted from liner notes.

=== Personnel ===
- George De Angelis – orchestration, programming, piano, keyboards
- Tony Brady – programming
- Phil Brown – bass (12)
- Stefano Cresta – percussion
- Housein Housein – percussion, cymbal
- Nikos Kalogeras – voice announcement (1)
- Nikos Karvelas – keyboards, guitars, backing vocals
- Takis Kouvatseas – drums, percussion
- Yiannis Kyfonidis – accordion, arrabian strings
- Yiannis Lionakis – guitars, oud, lute, baglama
- Elena Nikolaidou – voice announcement (1)
- Evripidis Nikolidis – bouzouki, cura, baglama, sarod
- Thanasis Vasilopoulos – clarinet, ney, mismar
- Anna Vissi – backing vocals

=== Production ===
- George De Angelis – executive producer, sound engineer, mix
- Ian Cooper – mastering
- Rupert Coulson – sound engineer
- Mara Desipri – photographer
- Dimitris Dimitroulis – make up
- George Klaromenos – photo processing
- Levinia Konyalian – styling
- Arsenis Miaris – image editing
- Panayiotis Papandrianos – hair styling
- Panos Pitsilidis – artwork
- Christos Simitas – photo processing
- Alexis Valourdos – photo processing

== Charts ==
Chart	Providers	Peak Position	Certification
Greek Albums Chart	IFPI	1	3× Platinum
Cypriot Albums Chart	All Records Top 20	1	3× Platinum
