= Antidoto =

Antidoto Αντίδοτο

Studio album by Anna Vissi
- Released: 1 April 1998
- Recorded: November 1997 – March 1998
- Studio: Echo studio, London
- Genre: Pop, Modern laika, Rock
- Length: 1:01:47
- Language: Greek
- Label: Sony Music Greece; Columbia
- Producer: Nikos Karvelas

Anna Vissi chronology
Travma (1997)	Antidoto; Αντίδοτο (1998)	Everything I Am (2000)

Singles from Antidoto
- 1. "Gazi" Released: December 1997; 2. "Erotevmenaki" Released: February 1998; 3. "S' Eho Epithimisi" Released: March 1998; 4. "Antidoto" Released: April 1998; 5. "Methismeni Mou Kardia" Released: May 1998; 6. "Mou Anikis" Released: June 1998; 7. "Magava Tout" Released: August 1998; 8. "Pali Gia Sena" Released: September 1998

Antidoto (Greek: Αντίδοτο; English: Antidote) is the nineteenth studio album by famous Greek singer, Anna Vissi. It was released on 1 April 1998 in Greece and Cyprus and certified platinum in a week, but later reached double-platinum status, selling over 140,000 units. It was the first album in Greek music history to sell 80,000 copies in the first week of its release. The album was also released in international packaging in France, Germany and South Africa.

== Album information ==
=== Background ===
The album was recorded in London during 1997 where Nikos Karvelas lived at the time. When Vissi was performing in Athens and would head off to London on her days off to record the album. "Gazi" was the first song she presented to the public during her gigs in Gazi Club in Athens in winter 1997–1998 season. The cover of Antidoto was made by a photograph from the booklet of the album Travma which was reversed and edited. Additional photos in the booklet were captured from the music video of Erotevmenaki. This album includes a duet with Paris Karagiannopoulos titled "Magava Tout" which was made a single in the summer. The CD was an enhanced CD format release which included the music video of the second single "Erotevmenaki". The album was packaged in two versions; the one on paperback, gatefold cover, the other in conventional jewel case. Both versions included the music video of the track "Erotevmenaki" as a free bonus.

In early 2019, a vinyl release for the album was scheduled. Later in the same year, the album was selected for inclusion in the Panik Gold box set The Legendary Recordings 1982-2019. The release came after Panik's acquisition rights of Vissi's back catalogue from her previous record company Sony Music Greece. This box set was printed on a limited edition of 500 copies containing CD releases of all of her albums from 1982 to 2019 plus unreleased material.

=== Sales ===
It became the fastest selling album until then in Greece selling more than 80,000 copies in the first week of its release and stands as the first album in Greek music history to reach platinum status in the first week of its release.

== Track listing ==
- All songs written by Nikos Karvelas, except where noted.
1. "Erotevmenaki" (My little love)
2. "S' Eho Epithimisi" (I've missed you)
3. "Methismeni Mou Kardia" (My drunken heart)
4. "Gazi" (Gas)
5. "Antidoto" (Antidote)
6. "Magava Tout (Thelo Esena)" (Duet with Paris Karagiannopoulos) (Magava Tout (I want you))
7. "Pali Yia Sena" (Again for you) (Lyrics: Apostolos Diavolikis; music: Karvelas)
8. "O Telefteos Stathmos" (Terminal stop)
9. "Gi 'Alla" (For others)
10. "Mou Anikis" (You belong to me)
11. "O Ponos Tis Agapis" (The pain of love)
12. "Denome" (Attached)
13. "Tilefonaki" (Mobile phone)
14. "Na Ton Agapas" (To love him) (Lyrics: Natalia Germanou; music: Karvelas)

== Singles ==
1. "Gazi"
2. "Erotevmenaki"
3. "S' Eho Epithimisi"
4. "Antidoto"
5. "Methismeni Mou Kardia"
6. "Mou Anikis"
7. "Magava Tout"
8. "Pali Gia Sena"

== Music videos ==
The following songs were released on promotional videos during 1998, airing in local TV stations:

1. "Erotevmenaki"
2. "S' Eho Epithimisi"
3. "Methismeni Mou Kardia"
4. "Magava Tout"
5. "Pali Gia Sena"
6. "Mou Anikis".

In 2001, "Erotevmenaki", "S' Eho Epithimisi" and "Mou Anikis" were selected for digital release on Vissi's The Video Collection.

== Credits ==
Credits adapted from the liner notes.

=== Personnel ===
- Giorgos Athanasoulas – violin (4, 6, 7, 8, 9, 11, 13)
- Nikos Karvelas – orchestration • guitars (1, 3, 4, 6, 7, 8, 9, 10, 12, 13, 14) • backing vocals (8, 9, 13)
- Jamal Kashad – percussion (1, 2, 5, 6, 8, 9, 10, 11, 12, 13)
- Labis Kemanetzidis – clarinet (4, 5, 6, 7, 12, 13)
- Dimitris Koliakoudakis – guitars (7, 14)
- Takis Kouvatseas – drums (2, 3, 4, 5, 6, 8, 9, 10, 11, 12, 13)
- Yiannis Lionakis – guitars (1, 2, 3, 4, 5, 6, 8, 10, 11) • bouzouki (1, 3, 6, 12) • cura (2, 8, 9, 10, 13) • baglama (1, 3, 8, 10) • lute (2) • oud (10, 11, 12)
- Thodoris Matoulas – harp (4, 7, 14)
- Kostas Miliotakis – keyboards
- Christos Olympios – cura (7, 14)
- Haris Tsirekas – cymbal (3)
- Giorgos Tsolakos – keyboards
- Nikos Vardis – bass (2, 3, 4, 5, 6, 8, 9, 10, 11, 12, 13)
- Anna Vissi – backing vocals (2, 9, 13)

=== Production ===
- Yiannis Aggelakis – make up
- Giorgos Chrisohoidis – inlay photos
- Antonis Glikos – artwork
- Yiannis Ioannidis – mastering
- Nikos Karvelas – production manager
- Mihalis Orfanos – cover printing
- Giorgos Ragkos – sound engineer, mix engineer
- Petros Siakavellas – mastering
- Katerina Sideridou – cover processing
- Stefanos Vasilakis – hair styling
- Tasos Vrettos – photographer

== Charts ==
Chart	Providers	Peak Position	Certification
Greek Albums Chart	IFPI	1	2×Platinum
Cypriot Albums Chart	All Records Top 20	1	3×Platinum
