= Mala: I Mousiki Tou Anemou =

Mala – I Mousiki Tou Anemou

Soundtrack album by Anna Vissi
- Released: April 26, 2002
- Recorded: December 2001–January 2002
- Genre: Opera
- Label: Sony Music Greece/Columbia
- Producer: Nikos Karvelas

Anna Vissi chronology
Ode to the Gods (1993)	Mala – I Mousiki Tou Anemou (2002)

Mala – I Mousiki Tou Anemou is the name of a Greek soundtrack album by singer Anna Vissi. Initially, a CD single of Mala was released in Greece and Cyprus, containing four tracks which went gold, and later the complete album of the soundtrack was released containing 27 tracks, all written and produced by Nikos Karvelas himself and the orchestration/instrumentation was done by Giorgos Niarhos. It reached Gold status in Greece, and Platinum status in Cyprus.

== Overview ==
"Mala" was originally put on stage on January 19, 2002 starring Anna Vissi. Nikos Karvelas was the creator of the whole play. In the performance, Anna Vissi was surrounded by another 60 actors (amongst them: Leonidas Kakouris as Edek, Aias Manthopoulos as Josef Mengele, Katerina Didaskalou as Madam Lilian, Elena Tirea; Stavros Giagoulis as Charles, Mala’s fiancé; Mihalis Anthis as Wilhelm Boger, Zoi Nalpandi, Elpida Braoudaki as Maria Mandl; Eleni Tzortzi as Sarah, a female kapo; Haris Vorkas as Adolf Taube, Tsitomenea Hara as Frau Schmidt, Zeta Douka as Margot Dreschel; Alexandros Panayi as Abraham Moses, a prisoner in Auschwitz; Panos Metaxopoulos; Stelios Nikolaidis as Pindas, Mala’s father; Niki Palikaraki as Saza, Mala’s mother; Antigoni Alikakou as Joshka, Mala’s sister; Antonis Dourakis as Isa, Joshka’s husband; Konna Sapantopoulou as Eva, a mother of twin girls; Ionas Manolis as Salo, Mala’s brother; Eleni Georgy, Alberto Eskenazi as Rabbi) and a 40-musicians orchestra.

In 2019, the soundtrack album was selected for inclusion in the Panik Gold box set The Legendary Recordings 1982-2019. The release came after Panik's acquisition rights of Vissi's back catalogue from her previous record company Sony Music Greece. This box set was printed on a limited edition of 500 copies containing CD releases of all of her albums from 1982 to 2019 plus unreleased material.

== Track listing ==
=== Disc 1 ===
1. "Theme Of Mala" (Theme of Mala (Instrumental))
2. "Gennisi" (Birth)
3. "Thema Tis Baptisis" (Theme of Christening (Instrumental))
4. "Mera Mpanei, Mera Vgainei" (Day in, day out)
5. "Ta Vivlia Agapo" (The books I love)
6. "Gia Ena Oneiro Zoume" (We live for a dream)
7. "Eimai Eleftheri" (I'm free)
8. "Imnos" (Anthem)
9. "H Mousiki Tou Anemou" (The music of the wind (Instrumental))
10. "Min Klais Fräulein" (Don't cry young lady)
11. "Stagona Stagona" (Drip, drip)
12. "Kitrino Astro" (Yellow star)

=== Disc 2 ===
1. "Afiksi Sto Auschwitz" (Arrival in Auschwitz (Instrumental))
2. "Frau Schmidt" (Mrs. Schmidt)
3. "Douleia douleia" (Work, work)
4. "Ola Tha Allaksoun" (Everything will change)
5. "O Erota!" (Oh love!)
6. "Tou Theou Oi Dialegmenou" (God's hand-picked)
7. "Fones" (Voices)
8. "Mia Agapi Fotia" (A love fire)
9. "Edek" (Edek)
10. "H Mousiki Tou Anemou" (The music of the wind)
11. "Monologos Boger" (Boger monologue)
12. "Akomi Ena Vradi" (Even one night here)
13. "Den Fovamai" (I'm not afraid)
14. "Gia Ena Oneiro Zoume" (We live for a dream (Finale))
15. "Thema Tis Mala" (Piano) (Theme of Mala (Piano))

== Chart performance ==
Chart	Peak position	Certification
Greek Albums Chart	2	Platinum
Cypriot Album Chart	1	Platinum

== See also ==
- Mala Zimetbaum
