= Re! =

Studio album by Anna Vissi
- Released: December 22, 1994
- Recorded: Whitfield Street Recording Studios; London, England
- Language: Greek
- Label: Sony Music Greece/Columbia
- Producer: Nikos Karvelas

Anna Vissi chronology
Live! (1993)	Re! (1994)	O! Kypros (1995)

Singles from Re!
- 1. "Eimai Poli Kala" Released: December 22, 1994; 2. "Re!" Released: February 1995; 3. "Eleni" Released: May 1995; 4. "Amin" Released: June 1995

Re! is a Greek album by singer Anna Vissi released in Greece and Cyprus on December 24, 1994. It was recorded in London at Whitfield Street Recording Studios and released by Sony Music Greece. It is the most acoustic album Vissi has released up to date. It was repackaged in 1995 to include the songs "Amin", "Eleni" and a remix of "Eimai Poli Kala". Music and lyrics are by Nikos Karvelas and Evi Droutsa.

== Release ==
Re! was originally released on December 24, 1994, featuring ten songs. In September 18, 1995, the album was re-released to include the songs "Amin" and "Eleni" and a remix of "Eimai Poli Kala", pushing sales to Gold status, with more than 40,000 units sold. The lyrics of the bonus tracks, though, were not included in the album's liner notes and overall no significant change was made in the original artwork. In 1999, a Turkish artist Hülya Avşar covered the single "Eleni" with the Turkish lyrics as "Sevdim" (I loved), which met moderate success, while radio stations also picked up the original version by Anna Vissi. Sony Music Turkey then decided upon the release of Re! in Turkey. The album reached 2× Platinum in Turkey.

The singles "Eimai Poli Kala", "Re!", "Amin" and "Eleni" were released on accompanying promotional videos during 1994 and 1995, all of which aired in local TV stations. "Eimai Poli Kala", directed by Nikos Soulis, was especially acclaimed for the use of CGI graphics applied on real-life locations around the city of Athens, a relatively novel technology for the 90s Greek market.

In 2001, "Eimai Poli Kala" and "Eleni" were selected for digital release on Vissi's The Video Collection.

In 2019, the album was selected for inclusion in the Panik Gold box set The Legendary Recordings 1982-2019. The release came after Panik's acquisition rights of Vissi's back catalogue from her previous record company Sony Music Greece. This box set was printed on a limited edition of 500 copies containing CD releases of all of her albums from 1982 to 2019 plus unreleased material.

== Track listing ==
Original 1994 release

1. "Re!" (Hey you!)
2. "30 Kai Vale" (Thirty something)
3. "Eimai Poli Kala" (I'm very well)
4. "Paragrafos 62" (Paragraph 62)
5. "To Allo Mou Ego" (My other self)
6. "I Varka" (The boat)
7. "Melanholies" (Melancholies)
8. "Diadilosi" (The protest)
9. "Efta Zoes" (Seven lives)
10. "Palio Periodiko" (Old magazine)

1995 re-release

1. "Re!" (Hey you!)
2. "30 Kai Vale" (Thirty something)
3. "Eimai Poli Kala" (I'm very well)
4. "Paragrafos 62" (Paragraph 62)
5. "To Allo Mou Ego" (My other self)
6. "I Varka" (The boat)
7. "Melanholies" (Melancholies)
8. "Diadilosi" (The protest)
9. "Efta Zoes" (Seven lives)
10. "Periodiko" (Magazine)
11. "Amin" (Amen)
12. "Eleni" (Helen)
13. "Eimai Poli Kala (Dance Mix)"

Turkish release

1. "Eleni"
2. "Amin"
3. "Re!"
4. "30 Kai Vale"
5. "Eimai Poli Kala"
6. "Paragrafos 62"
7. "To Allo Mou Ego"
8. "I Varka"
9. "Melanholies"
10. "Diadilosi"
11. "Efta Zoes"
12. "Periodiko"

== Singles ==
The following songs were released as singles from the album and were accompanied by music videos.

1. "Re!" (Director: Giannis Thomopoulos)
2. "Eimai Poli Kala" (Director: Nikos Soulis)
3. "Amin" (Director: Giannis Thomopoulos)
4. "Eleni" (Director: Giannis Thomopoulos)

== Credits and personnel ==
Personnel

- Agapitos - bouzouki on track “Eleni”
- Nikos Chatzopoulos - violin
- Evi Droutsa - lyrics
- Nikos Karvelas - music, lyrics, keyboards, guitar on the track “I Varka”
- Alexis Mpoulgourtzis - percussions (darbhuka, bendir, tambhit, bongus, conga, triangle, cymbals)
- Sakis Pilatos - bass on track “Eleni”
- Panagiotis Stergiou - acoustic guitars, üti, bouzouki, tzouras, baglamas, acoustic bass
- John Themis - guitars on track “Paragrafos 62”
- Anna Vissi - vocals

Production

- Nikos Karvelas/Sony Music - production management, arrangements, instrumentation
- Martyn ‘Max’ Heyes - recording engineering at Whitfield Street Recording Studios (London)
- U.B.A. - preproduction at Studio Hampstead
- Jason Westbrook - assistant recording engineer

Design

- Brian Aris - photos
- Michael Charalambous - hair styling from Neville & Daniel Knightsbridge
- Yiannis Doxas - cover design
- Sheryll Phelps Gardener - make up artist

Credits adapted from the album's liner notes.
