= Sakis Rouvas discography =

Albums from Greek musician Sakis Rouvas

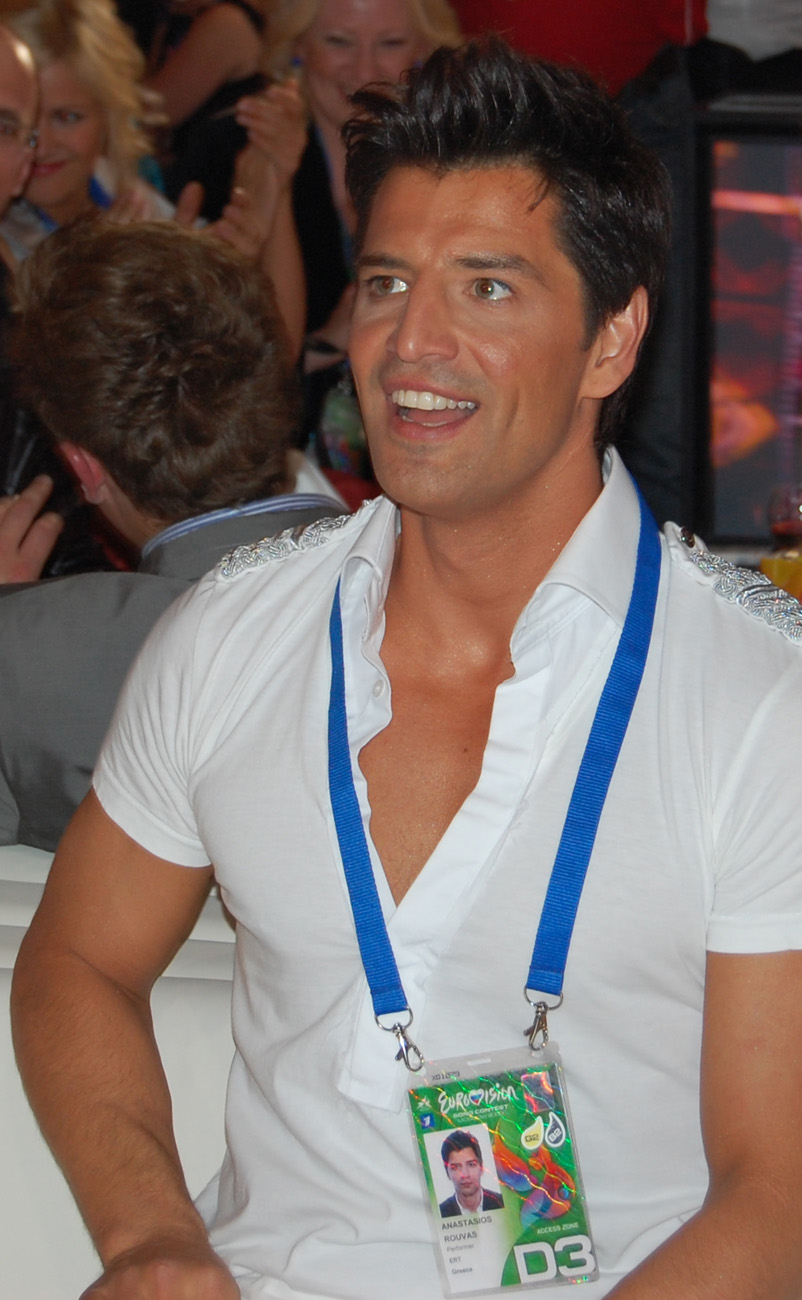
- Sakis Rouvas at the Eurovision Song Contest 2009.
- Studio albums: 14
- Extended plays: 3
- Soundtrack albums: 5
- Live albums: 2
- Compilation albums: 9
- Singles: 12
- B-sides: 3
- Video albums: 6
- Music videos: 62
- Collaborations: 4
- Box sets: 2
- Airplay singles: 82

This article features the discography of Greek pop, rock, R&B, and dance musician Sakis Rouvas, which includes twelve studio albums, two live albums, and a total of six compilation albums: two greatest hits albums, one remix compilation album, one ballad compilation, and two box set albums. Furthermore, are three EPs and 12 singles (five of which have been released exclusively to Greece and Cyprus and seven which have been released internationally), as well as six albums that contain video. For video releases, see Sakis Rouvas videography.

Rouvas is among the most successful Greek artists of all-time, having sales of an estimated two million records. All of his albums have achieved certifications of gold or higher in both Greece and Cyprus. Internationally, Rouvas has also scored hits in France, Sweden, Turkey, Bulgaria, North Africa and Russia.

== Albums ==
All the albums listed underneath were released and charted in Greece and Cyprus. Some albums charted internationally.

=== Studio albums ===
- * denotes unknown or unavailable information.

Year	Album details	Peak chart positions		Sales	Certifications (sales thresholds)
Year	Album details	GRE	CYP	Sales	Certifications (sales thresholds)
1991	Sakis Rouvas: Released: October, 1991; Label: PolyGram Greece, Philips; Formats: LP, Cassette, CD	1	*	World: *	GRE: * (Note: Before 1998, it is reported that Rouvas had been awarded two gold and one platinum album, indicating at least 120,000 sales.); CYP: *
1992	Min Andistekese: Released: September 1992; Label: PolyGram Greece, Philips, Fidelity; Formats: LP, Cassette, CD	*	*	World: *	GRE: *; CYP: *
1993	Gia Sena: Released: March 1993; Label: PolyGram Records, Philips; Formats: LP, Cassette, CD	*	*	World: *	GRE: *; CYP:
1994	Aima, Dakrya & Idrotas: Released: November 1994; Label: PolyGram Greece, Philips; Formats: LP, Cassette, CD	*	*	World: *	GRE: *; CYP:
1996	Tora Arhizoun Ta Dyskola: Released: May 12, 1996; Label: PolyGram Greece, Mercury; Formats: LP, Cassette, CD	*	*	World: *	GRE: *; CYP: *
1998	Kati Apo Mena: Released: December 3, 1998; Label: Minos; Formats: LP, Cassette, CD	*	*	GRE: 25,000	GRE: Gold; CYP: *
2000	21os Akatallilos: Released: April 9, 2000; Label: Minos EMI; Formats: LP, Cassette, CD	1	1	World: *	GRE: *; CYP: *
2002	Ola Kala: Released: June 16, 2002; Label: Universal Music France/ULM, EMI/Capitol; Formats: LP, Cassette, CD	1	*	GRE: 50,000	GRE: Platinum; CYP: *
2003	To Hrono Stamatao: Released: December 20, 2003; Label: Minos EMI; Formats: CD, Digital Download	*	*	GRE: 80,000	GRE: 2× Platinum; CYP: 3× Platinum
2005	S'eho Erotefthi: Released: April 6, 2005; Label: Minos EMI; Formats: CD, Digital Download	1	*	GRE: 80,000	GRE: 2× Platinum; CYP: *
2006	Iparhi Agapi Edo: Released: December 5, 2006; Label: Minos EMI; Formats: CD, Digital Download	1	*	GRE: 40,000	GRE: Platinum; CYP: *
2008	Irthes: Released: December 3, 2008; Label: Minos EMI; Formats: CD, Digital Download	2	1	World: *	GRE: Platinum; CYP: *
2010	Parafora: Released: December 14, 2010; Label: Minos EMI; Formats: CD, Digital Download	1	*	World: *	GRE: 2× Platinum; CYP: *
2021	Sta Kalitera Mou: Released: May 28, 2021; Label: Minos EMI; Formats: CD, Digital Download	1	*		GRE: (Note: As of 2021, IFPI Greece provides certifications, or "awards", only for digital singles.); CYP:
"—" denotes releases that did not chart or was not released

== Notes ==
- Note: Albums without chart positions may have charted but there is no information currently available.

=== Live albums ===
Year	Title	Chart positions		Certification	Sales threshold^{1}
Year	Title	GRE	CYP	Certification	Sales threshold^{1}
2006	Live Ballads: 1st live album/DVD; Released: April 27, 2006; Language(s): Greek, English; Label: Minos EMI; Formats: Double-disc CD, CD/DVD, longbox CD (Special Edition); Sales combined with Special Edition release.; Recorded at Athens College on February 14, 2006.; Live Ballads: Special Edition includes a photo album of the performance.	1		IFPI Greece: Gold; CYP: N/A	GRE: 20,000; CYP: N/A
2007	This Is My Live: 2nd live album/DVD; Released: December 12, 2007; Language(s): Greek, English; Label: Minos EMI; Formats: Double-disc CD (paperback), CD/DVD, limited edition gift box; Sales combined with limited edition Christmas gift box.; Recorded at Lycabetus Theater on September 9, 2007.; Album includes the single "Stous 31 Dromous" from the soundtrack of the same name.; The Christmas gift box includes the 2007 release of the Sakis Rouvas doll with a bonus DVD.			IFPI Greece: N/A; CYP: N/A	GRE: CYP:

^{1} The sales thresholds do not represent the exact sales of the album, but the traditional amount of sales needed to earn the particular certification.

=== Official compilations ===
The Top 30 Collections chart (Top 30 Συλλογών) was published from mid 2003 until it was discontinued in week 19, 2008.

Year	Title	Chart positions		Certification	Sales threshold^{1}
Year	Title	GRE	CYP	Certification	Sales threshold^{1}
1999	Me Kommeni Tin Anasa (Greek: Με Κομμένη Την Ανάσα; English: Breathless): 1st greatest hits album; Released: October 5, 1999; Language(s): Greek, English; Label: Universal Music, Mercury; Formats: Double-disc CD, Remastered CD			IFPI Greece: Uncertified; CYP: Uncertified	GRE: CYP:
2003	Remixes: 1st remix compilation; Released: July 2003; Language: Greek; Label: Minos EMI; Formats: Double-disc CD, CD/DVD, remastered CD			IFPI Greece: Uncertified; CYP:	GRE: CYP:
2005	The Ultimate Collection: Music + Video - 1991–1996: 2nd greatest hits album; Released: September 6, 2005; Language: Greek; Label: Universal Music, Mercury; Formats: Double-disc CD (paperback), CD/DVD, remastered CD			IFPI Greece: Uncertified; CYP: Uncertified	GRE: N/A; CYP: N/A
2007	Ta Erotika: Sakis Rouvas (Greek: Τα Ερωτικά Σάκης Ρουβάς; English: Erotica): 1st love song/ballad compilation; Released: February 10, 2007; Language: Greek; Label: Universal Music, Mercury; Formats: CD, remastered CD			IFPI Greece: Uncertified; CYP: Uncertified	GRE: N/A; CYP: N/A
2007	I Megaliteres Epitihies + Kai Se Thelo (Greek: Οι Μεγαλύτερες Επιτυχίες + Και Σε Θέλω; English: The Greatest Hits + Kai Se Thelo): 3rd greatest hits compilation; Released: October 2008; Language: Greek; Label: Minos EMI; Formats: CD, digital download			IFPI Greece: Uncertified; CYP: Uncertified	GRE: N/A; CYP: N/A
2009	The Ballads: 1st ballad compilation; Released: May 2009; Language:Greek, English; Label: Minos EMI; Formats: CD, digital download			IFPI Greece: Uncertified; CYP: Uncertified	GRE: N/A; CYP: N/A
2015	The Early Years: 4th greatest hits compilation; Released: November 2015; Language:Greek; Label: Minos EMI; Formats: CD, digital download			IFPI Greece: Uncertified; CYP: Uncertified	GRE: N/A; CYP: N/A

^{1} The sales thresholds do not represent the exact sales of the album, but the traditional amount of sales needed to earn the particular certification.

==== Box sets ====
Year	Title	Chart positions		Certification	Sales threshold
Year	Title	GRE	CYP	Certification	Sales threshold
2001	Sakis Rouvas (Greek: Σάκης Ρουβάς): 1st box set album; Released: 2001; Language: Greek; Label: Universal Music, Mercury, Delta Club; Formats: Four-disc box set CD, remastered CD			IFPI Greece: Uncertified; CYP: Uncertified	GRE: N/A; CYP: N/A
2007	Ap'Tin Arhi: I Megaliteres Epitihies (Greek: Απ'Την Αρχἠ: Οι Μεγαλύτερες Επιτυχίες; English: From The Beginning: The Greatest Hits): 2nd box set compilation; Released: August 17, 2007; Language: Greek; Label: Minos EMI; Formats: Four-disc CD, CD/DVD, longbox CD, remastered CD			IFPI Greece: Uncertified; CYP: Uncertified	GRE: N/A; CYP: N/A

=== Other compilations ===
Year	Title	Chart positions		Certification	Sales threshold
Year	Title	GRE	CYP	Certification	Sales threshold
1999	Best Love Songs: Unofficial compilation album; Released: 1999; Language: Greek; Label: Universal Music, Mercury; Formats: CD, remastered CD; This compilation was released by Pink! Magazine as a gift from their press with permission from the owner of Rouvas' former label, Universal Music Greece. It was not created for charts.	N/A	N/A	IFPI Greece: N/A; CYP: N/A	GRE: N/A; CYP: N/A
2007	I Hrisi Diskothiki (Greek: Η Χρυσή Δισκοθίκη English: The Golden Record Collection): Unofficial compilation album; Released: November 2007; Language: Greek; Label: Universal Music, Mercury; Formats: CD (paperback), remastered CD; This compilation was released by Espresso News as a gift from their press with permission from the owner of Rouvas' former label, Universal Music Greece. It was not created for charts.	N/A	N/A	IFPI Greece: N/A; CYP: N/A	GRE: N/A; CYP: N/A

== Special edition releases ==
- 1996: Tora Arhizoun Ta Dyskola (Special edition re-release with remixes).
- 2001: 21os Akatallilos re-released with 2 bonus remixes.
- 2002: Ola Kala was re-released in Greece as what is sometimes called the Gold Edition. It was then released as the international edition and the French edition.
- 2003: Remixes was re-released to contain bonus DVD footage.
- 2003: Ola Kala was re-released in Europe and France.
- 2004: Ola Kala was re-released across Europe after Rouvas' success in the Eurovision Song Contest 2004.
- 2005: S'eho Erotefthi was released as S'eho Erotefthi: Special Edition in longbox format.
- 2006: Live Ballads: Special Edition was released as a longbox simultaneously with the standard version.
- 2007: This Is My Live was also released in gift box format.

== EPs ==
Year	Title	Chart positions		Certification	Sales threshold
Year	Title	GRE	CYP	Certification	Sales threshold
2006	8 Megales Epitihies (Greek: 8 Μεγάλες Επιτυχίες; English: 8 Greatest Hits): 1st EP; Released: 2006; Language: Greek; Label: Universal Music; Formats: Promo CD, remastered CD			IFPI Greece: Uncertified; CYP: Uncertified	GRE: N/A; CYP: N/A
2007	Dance Mixes: Afiste Tin & Tora Arhizoun Ta Dyskola (Greek: Dance Mixes: Αφήστε Την & Τώρα Αρχίζουν Τα Δύσκολα; English: Dance Mixes: Leave Her Alone & Now The Difficult Times Begin): 2nd EP; Released: May 24, 2007; Language: Greek; Label: Universal Music; Formats: CD			IFPI Greece: Uncertified; CYP: Uncertified	GRE: N/A; CYP: N/A
2007	Monadikes Erminies (Greek: Μοναδικές Ερμηνείες; English: Unique Interpretations): 3rd EP; Released: December 2007; Language: Greek; Label: Minos EMI; Formats: Promo CD, remastered CD			IFPI Greece: Uncertified; CYP: Uncertified	GRE: N/A; CYP: N/A

== Singles ==
In Greece and Cyprus, singles were typically released solely as radio singles instead of physical copies. CD Maxis or EPs are rarely issued, and when they are, they generally feature up to seven new tracks or remixes of various songs. This format ensures they meet the criteria for single charts by including up to seven different songs.

=== CD singles ===
Year	Single	Chart positions		Album	IFPI Certification
Year	Single	GRE	CYP	Album	IFPI Certification
1991	"Par'ta"	1	—	Sakis Rouvas	—
1996	"Tora Arhizoun Ta Dyskola"	1	1	Tora Arhizoun Ta Dyskola	Gold
1998	"Theleis I Den Theleis"	1	1	Kati Apo Mena	Gold
2001	"Disco Girl"	1	1	Ola Kala	Platinum
2002	"Ola Kala"	1	—	Ola Kala	Gold
2002	"The Light"^{2}	—	—	Ola Kala	—
2003	"Feelings"^{2}	—	—	Ola Kala	—
2003	"Dis Lui"^{2}	—	—	Ola Kala	—
2003	"Pes Tis"	1	1	To Hrono Stamatao	Platinum
2004	"Shake It"	1	1	To Hrono Stamatao	4× Platinum
2004	"Se Thelo San Trelos"^{2} (With Philipp Kirkorov)	—	—	Single only	
2005	"Na M'agapas"	1	—	S'eho Erotefthi	
2009	"This Is Our Night"	N\A		Irthes	
"—" denotes the single failed to chart, or wasn't released to that particular chart or region. "*" denotes unknown or unavailable information. "N/A" denotes that there was no chart for this type of release at the time of its release.

^{2}Some singles released for international charts only.

- Note: Singles without chart positions may have charted but there is no information currently available.
- The Top 50 Singles chart that the official sales chart for singles, was discontinued in week 19, 2008

=== As lead artist ===
List of charting songs as lead artist with selected chart positions and certifications, showing year released and album name
Title	Year	Peak chart positions		Certifications (Only for digital single formats).	Album
Title	Year	GRE (airplay)	Other charts	Certifications (Only for digital single formats).	Album
"Ola Gyro Sou Gyrizoun" (Everything Revolves Around You)	2006	*	—	2 x Platinum	Iparhi Agapi Edo
"Spase Ton Xrono" (Break the Time)	2009	1	—		Parafora
"Emena Thes" (I Want You)	2010	4	—	Gold	Parafora
"Parafora" (Maddly)	2010	2	—		Parafora
"Oi Dio Mas" (The Two of Us)	2011	1	—		Parafora
"Tora" (Now)	2012	3	—		Non-album single
"Pio Psila" (Higher)	2014	8	—		Non-album single
"Se Pethimisa" (I Missed You)	2014	7	—		Non-album single
"Fila Me" (Kiss Me)	2015	38	—		Non-album single
"Radiofona" (Radios)	2015	6	—		Non-album single
"Dio Theoi" (Two Gods)	2015	28	—		Non-album single
"Ola" (All)	2016	36	—		Non-album single
"Apolytos Erotas" (Absolute Love)	2017	17	—		Non-album single
"Zitima Zois" (Matter of Life)	2017	47	—		Non-album single
"Hronia Polla" (Happy New Year) (Re-release)	2017	40	—		Non-album single
"Kalimera" (Goodmorning)	2018	13	—		Non-album single
"Amartolos" (Sinner)	2019	21	—		Non-album single
"Ego Sta Elega" (I Told You So)	2019	6	—		Non-album single
"Ela Sto Horo" (Come Dance)	2019	23	—		Non-album single
"Mesa Mou Thalassa" (Sea Inside Me)	2020	42	—		Non-album single
"Yperanthropos" (Superhuman)	2021	9	—		Sta Kalytera Mou
"Pare Me Agkalia "(Hug Me)	2021	1	—		Sta Kalytera Mou
"Sta Kalitera Mou" (At My Best)	2022	12	—	Platinum	Sta Kalytera Mou
"Yperoxi Zoi" (Wonderful Life)	2022	32	—		Sta Kalytera Mou
"Ela Kai Tha Deis" (Come and You Will See)	2023	47	—		Non-album singles
"Kaka Paidia" (Bad Boys)	2023	29	—		Non-album singles
"Ego S'agapo" (I Love You) (Re-release)	2024	43	—		Non-album singles
"Ti Matia" (What Eyes)	2024	27	—		Non-album singles
"Kontra Pao" ("I Go Against")	2025	17	—		Non-album singles
"Kounia Bella" (Swingin' Bella/Swingin' Trouble) (ft FY)	2025	41	—		Non-album singles
"Erotas Skoteinos" (Dark Love)	2025	22	—		Non-album singles
"Krayion" (Lipstick)	2026				

- IFPI Greece provide the official Top 200 Airplay chart.
- In 2018, IFPI started publishing the Top 100 Digital Singles chart. The chart is based on streaming data provided by Akazoo, Spotify, Apple Music, Napster and Deezer as well as song downloads from iTunes.
- Singles not mentioned may have charted but there is no information currently available.

=== As featured artist ===
Title	Year	Peak chart positions	Album
Title	Year	GRE	Album
"Kathe Fora Pou Gelaei Ena Paidi" (Mimis Plessas ft Sakis Rouvas)	1992	*	Kathe Fora Pou Gelaei Ena Paidi
"Se Thelo, Me Theleis" (Anna Vissi & Sakis Rouvas)	1997	*	Travma
"Birgün/Otan" (Burak Kut & Sakis Rouvas)	1997	*	—N/a
"To Vatrahaki Kai Alles Istories" (Stamatis Kraounakis ft Sakis Rouvas and Lina Nikolakopoulou)	1998	*	Sperantza
"Oso Exo Esena" (Stelios Rokkos ft Sakis Rouvas)	1999	*	Kapos Allios...
"Se Thelo San Trelos" (Sakis Rouvas ft Philip Kirkorov)	2004	*	—N/a
"Kak Shumacheshki Ya" (Sakis Rouvas & Philip Kirkorov)(Russian Version of "Se Thelo San Trelos")	2004	*	—N/a
"Tharros I Alitheia" (Tamta ft Sakis Rouvas)	2009	*	Tharros I Alitheia
"Zorika Vradia" (Stelios Rokkos & Sakis Rouvas)	2018	54	Digital Single
"Etsi Einai I Fasi" (Helena Paparizou & Sakis Rouvas)	2020	7	Apohrosis
"S' Agapo" (Manos Xidous)	2021	_	O Prigkipas Tis Dytikis Ochthis
"Sok" (Konstantinos Argyros & Sakis Rouvas)	2023	42	22 (Diamond Edition)
"Thema" (3SUM ft Sakis Rouvas)	2024	60	Digital Single
"M' Agapas H Sou Perase?" (Katerina Lioliou & Sakis Rouvas)	2026		2100 - Gen Eta (Part A)
"—" denotes the single failed to chart, or wasn't released to that particular chart or region. "*" denotes unknown or unavailable information. "N/A" denotes that there was no chart for this type of release at the time of its release.

=== Full singles discography ===
- Radio singles released in Cyprus and Greece

==== 1990–1999 ====
Title	Year	Album
"Par'ta" (Take Them)	1991	Sakis Rouvas
"1992" [=Hilia Enia-Kosia Eneninda-Dyo]	1991	Sakis Rouvas
"Gia Fantasou" (Come On, Fantasize)	1992	Sakis Rouvas
"Gyrna" (Come Back)	1992	Min Andistekese
"Min Andistekese" (Don't Resist)	1992	Min Andistekese
"Me Kommeni Tin Anasa" (Breathless)	1993	Min Andistekese
"Na Ziseis Moro Mou" (Happy Birthday Baby)	1993	Min Andistekese
"Kane Me" (Make Me)	1993	Gia Sena
"To Xero Ise Moni" (I Know You Are Alone)	1993	Gia Sena
"Xehase To" (Just Forget It)	1994	Gia Sena
"Aima, Dakrya & Idrotas" (Blood, Sweat & Tears)	1994	Aima, Dakrya & Idrotas
"Xana" (Again)	1994	Aima, Dakrya & Idrotas
"Ela Mou" (Come To Me)	1995	Aima, Dakrya & Idrotas
"Symplegma Idipodio" (Oedipus Complex)	1995	Aima, Dakrya & Idrotas
"Grothia" (Fist)	1995	Aima, Dakrya & Idrotas
"Mia Fora" (For Once)	1995	Aima, Dakrya & Idrotas
"Tora Arhizoun Ta Dyskola" (Now Begin The Difficult Times)	1996	Tora Arhizoun Ta Dyskola
"Afiste Tin" (Leave Her)	1996	Tora Arhizoun Ta Dyskola
"Ase Me Na Fygo" (Let Me Leave)	1996	Tora Arhizoun Ta Dyskola
"Mi M'agapiseis" (Don't Love Me)	1996	Tora Arhizoun Ta Dyskola
"Pou ke Pote" (When and Where?)	1996	Tora Arhizoun Ta Dyskola
"Theleis I Den Theleis" (Do You Want to or Not?)	1998	Kati Apo Mena
"I Kardia Mou" (My Heart)	1998	Kati Apo Mena
"Den Ehi Sidera I Kardia Sou" (Your Heart Doesn't Have Rails)	1999	Kati Apo Mena
"O Tropos Pou Kitazi" (The Way She Stares)	1999	Kati Apo Mena
"Ipirhes Panda" (You Existed Always)	1999	Kati Apo Mena
"Ta Aspra Triandafylla" (White Roses)	1999	Kati Apo Mena

==== 2000–2009 ====
Title	Year	Album
"Andexa" (I Endured)	2000	21os Akatallilos
"Se Thelo San Trelos" (I Want You Like Crazy)	2000	21os Akatallilos
"Askisi Ipotagis" (Exercise of Obedience)	2000	21os Akatallilos
"Kanoume Onira" (We're Making Dreams)	2000	21os Akatallilos
"In'O,ti Kratisa" (It's What I Kept)	2000	21os Akatallilos
"I Fili ki I Gnosti" (Friends and Acquaintances)	2000	21os Akatallilos
"Delfinaki" (Little Dolphin)"	2000	21os Akatallilos
"Akatallilos (X-Rated)"	2000	21os Akatallilos
"Andexa" (Club Mix)	2000	21os Akatallilos
"Disco Girl"	2001	Ola Kala
"Disco Girl" (English Version)	2001	Ola Kala
"Ola Kala" (Everything Is Fine)	2002	Ola Kala
"Mia Zoi Mazi" (One Life Together)	2002	Ola Kala
"Ola Kala" (English Version)	2002	Ola Kala
"Oso Zo" (As Long As I Live)	2002	Ola Kala
"Iparheis" (You Exist)	2002	Ola Kala
"The Light" (English Version of "Mia Zoe Mazi")	2002	Ola Kala
"Pes Tis" (Tell Her) (Greek Version of the English Hit "Feelings")	2002	Ola Kala
"Dis Lui" (Tell Her) (French Version of the English Hit "Feelings")	2003	Ola Kala
"Feelings"	2003	Ola Kala
"I'll Give You My Heart"	2003	Ola Kala
"To Hrono Stamatao" (I'm Stopping Time)	2003	To Hrono Stamatao
"To Koritsi Ekino" (The Girl Over There)	2004	To Hrono Stamatao
"Shake It" (One of the most successful singles in Greek History; 47 weeks on singles' charts)	2004	To Hrono Stamatao
"Ise Ta Panda" (You Are Everything)	2004	To Hrono Stamatao
"Se Kathe Anapnoi" (With Every Deep Breath)	2004	To Hrono Stamatao
"Hronia Polla" (Happy New Year)	2004	To Hrono Stamatao
"S'eho Erotefthi" (I've Fallen In Love With You)	2005	S'eho Erotefthi
"Na M'agapas" (You Should Love Me)	2005	S'eho Erotefthi
"Cairo"	2005	S'eho Erotefthi
"Hartini Zoi" (Paper Life)	2005	S'eho Erotefthi
"Spasmena Filia" (Shattered Kisses) (Greek Version of "I'll Give You My Heart")"	2005	S'eho Erotefthi
"Hilia Milia" (1000 Milies)	2005	S'eho Erotefthi
"Mila Tis" (Talk To Her)"	2005	S'eho Erotefthi
"Agapa Me" (Love Me)	2005	Live Ballads
"Na M'agapas" (Alternate Version)	2006	Live Ballads
"O,ti Onirevomoun" (Whatever I Dreamed)	2006	Live Ballads
"18 (Yparhi Agape Edo)" [=Deka-ohto] (There Is Love Here)"	2006	Iparhi Agapi Edo
"Ego Travao Zori" (I'm Under Pressure)	2006	Iparhi Agapi Edo
"Ola Gyro Sou Gyrizoun" (Everything Revolves Around You)"	2006	Iparhi Agapi Edo
"Zise Ti Zoi" (Live Life)	2006	Alter Ego
"One With This World"	2007	Alter Ego
"Suspicious Minds"	2007	Alter Ego
"Stous 31 Dromous" (On The 31 Roads)	2007	This Is My Live
"+ Se Thelo" (And I Want You)	2008	Irthes
"Irthes" (You Came)	2008	Irthes
"This Is Our Night"	2009	Irthes
"Spase To Hrono" (Shatter time)"	2009	Parafora

==== 2010–2019 ====
Title	Year	Album
"Emena Thes" (I am the one you want)	2010	Parafora
"Parafora" (Madly)	2010	Parafora
"Yparxei Elpida" (There is Hope)	2011	Parafora
"Oi Dio Mas" (The two of us)	2011	Parafora
"Kane Na Min S'Agapiso" (Make me not love you)	2012	Digital Single
"Tora" (Now)	2012	Digital Single
"Pio Psila" (Higher)	2014	Digital Single
"Radiofona" (Radio)	2015	Digital Single
"Fila me" (Kiss me)	2015	Digital Single
"Dio Theoi" (Two Gods)	2015	Digital Single
"Ola" (All)	2016	Digital Single
"Zitima Zois" (Matter of Life)	2017	Digital Single
"Kalimera" (Goodmorning)	2018	Digital Single
"Ela Sto Horo" (Come Dance)	2019	Digital Single
"Amartolos" (Sinner)	2019	Digital Single
"Ego Sta Elega"(I Told You So)	2019	Digital Single

==== 2020–present ====
Title	Year	Album
"Mesa Mou Thalassa" (Sea Inside Me)	2020	Digital Single
"Yperanthropos" (Superhuman)	2020	Sta Kalitera Mou
"Pare Me Agkalia" (Hug Me)	2021	Sta Kalitera Mou
"Sta Kalitera Mou" (At My Best)	2021	Sta Kalitera Mou
Yperoxi Zoi ( Wonderful Life)	2022	Sta Kalitera Mou
"Ela Kai Tha Deis" (Come And You Will See)	2023	Digital Single
"Ta Kaka Paidia" (The Bad Boys)	2023	Digital Single
"Ego S'agapo" (I Love You) (Re-release of his 1991 song)	2023	Digital Single
"Ti Matia" (What Eyes)	2024	Digital Single
"Kontra Pao" ("I Go Against")	2025	Digital Single
"Kounia Bella" (Swingin' Bella/Swingin' Trouble) (ft FY)	2025	Digital Single
"Erotas Skoteinos" (Dark Love)	2025	Digital Single

== Original soundtracks ==
Rouvas contributed music to the following soundtracks:

Year	Title	Chart positions		Certification	Sales threshold
Year	Title	GRE	CYP	Certification	Sales threshold
1996	I Panagia Ton Parision (Greek: Η Παναγία Των Παρίσιων; English: The Hunchback of Notre Dame): 1st soundtrack; Released: June 1999; Language(s): Greek, Turkish; Label: PolyGram Greece; Formats: CD			IFPI Greece: CYP:	GRE: CYP:
2006	Aftokinita (Greek: Αυτοκίνητα; English: Cars): 2nd soundtrack; Released: July 2006; Language: Greek; Label: Minos EMI; Formats: CD			IFPI Greece: CYP:	GRE: CYP:
2007	Alter Ego: 3rd soundtrack; Released: May 2007; Language: English, Greek; Label: Minos EMI; Formats: CD, digital download			IFPI Greece: Uncertified; CYP: Uncertified	GRE: N/A; CYP: N/A
2008	Stous 31 Dromous (Greek: Στους 31 Δρόμους; English: On the 31 Roads): 4th soundtrack; Released: January 2008; Language: Greek; Label: Minos EMI; Formats: CD			IFPI Greece: Uncertified; CYP: Uncertified	GRE: N/A; CYP: N/A
2015	Iraklis - Oi 12 Athloi (English:Hercules: 12 labours): Music for the theatrical play; Released: January 22, 2015; Label: Minos EMI; Formats: CD, Digital Download			IFPI Greece: CYP:	GRE: CYP:
2020	Taxidi (English:The Journey): Music composed for Akis Petretzikis's cooking show, Akis' Food Tour.; Released: January 31, 2020 (as part of the show, not as a single); Language: Greek				

== International discography ==
=== Albums ===
- 2002: Ola Kala
- 2005: I'm in Love With You (S'eho Erotefthi)

=== Singles ===
- 2002: "Disco Girl"
- 2002: "Ola Kala"
- 2002: "The Light"
- 2003: "Feelings"
- 2003: "Dis Lui"
- 2004: "Shake It"
- 2009: "Keep On Moving"
- 2009: "This Is Our Night"

=== International music videos ===
- 1996: "Birgün/Otan" (With Burak Kut)
- 2002: "Disco Girl" (English Version)
- 2002: "Ola Kala" (Stereodrome Remix) (English Version)
- 2003: "Feelings"
- 2003: "Dis Lui"
- 2004: "Shake It" (International Version)
- 2004: "Se Thelo San Trelos" (With Philipp Kirkorov)
- 2004: "Se Thelo San Trelos/Kak Sumacheshkij Ya" (With Philipp Kirkorov)
- 2004: "Kak Sumacheshkij Ya" (With Philipp Kirkorov)

=== International charts ===
==== Albums ====
Ola Kala

- French Albums Chart No. 132

==== CD singles ====
"Disco Girl"

- French Singles Chart No. 79

"Dis lui"

- French Singles Chart No. 63

Shake It!"

- Swedish Singles Chart No. 32

"Se Thelo San Trelos"

- Russian Airplay Chart #20

"This Is Our Night"

- Russian Airplay Chart #265
