= Sakis Rouvas videography =

Sakis Rouvas Videography discography
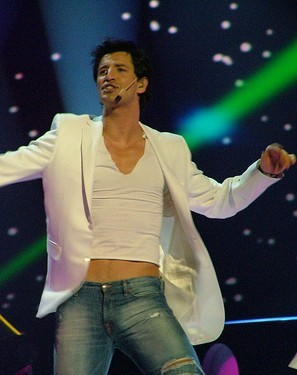
- Sakis Rouvas representing Greece in the Eurovision Song Contest 2004.
- Singles: 1
- Video albums: 5
- Music videos: 84

This page features the complete videography of Greek artist Sakis Rouvas. Sakis Rouvas, has released five video albums and has been featured in eighty-four music videos, and twenty one commercials.

During the early stage of his career, Rouvas’s music videos were directed by or based on ideas from his manager.

Between the late 1990s and early 2000s, Sakis Rouvas collaborated extensively with director Yorgos Lanthimos. Lanthimos's work with Rouvas is characterized by its bold exploration of male and female sexuality, frequently using nudity and iconoclasm to challenge conventional depictions of the human body. The music videos had references to various cinematic genres and media archeology. For example, the music video for "Ipirxes Panda" evokes the aesthetic of a 1950s road movie shot on Super 8 film. Similarly, "Den Ehi Sidera I Kardia Sou" integrates the concept of “post-industrial decay,”within a visual narrative that draws heavily on American science fiction tropes.

The music video for "I Kardia mou" has a black-and-white noir narrative, where Lanthimos employs close-up shots to fetishize various parts of Rouvas’s body, playing with the visual language traditionally used to objectify female pop stars. Meanwhile, "Antexa" presents a single, uninterrupted take of four and a half minutes, a technique that both evokes the atmospheric tension of Francis Ford Coppola’s Bram Stoker’s Dracula and Neil Jordan’s Interview with the Vampire, and simultaneously offers a meta-narrative where a 16-mm camera films an erotic sequence with Rouvas. The climax of this video features a clapboard revealing the director as "Buck Rogers," a playful nod to American sci-fi.

The video for “Thelis i den theleis” (1998) was particularly celebrated, earning the Best Music Video award at the 1998 Pop Corn Music Awards. The following year, the video for "Den Ehi Sidera I Kardia Sou" also received the Best Music Video award.

In 2009, Sakis Rouvas and Yorgos Lanthimos reunited for another collaboration, working on a music video for the song “Irthes.” Although this video ultimately did not become the official release. Rouvas went on to collaborate with more directors, such as Kostas Kapetanidis, Nikos Soulis, and the White Room, earning him numerous nominations for Best Music Video throughout his career.

== Music videos ==
Year	Title	Album / Single	
1991	"Par'ta" (Take Them)	Sakis Rouvas	Nikos Soulis / Antidoton
1992	"1992"	Sakis Rouvas	Nikos Soulis / Antidoton
1992	"Min Andistekese" (Don't Resist)	Min Andistekese	Etien Theotokis
1993	"Kane Me" (Make Me)	Gia Sena	Georgos and Ilias Psinakis/ View Studio
1993	"To Xero Ise Moni" (I Know You Are Alone)	Gia Sena	Georgos and Ilias Psinakis/ View Studio
1993	"Xehase To" (Forget It)	Gia Sena	Georgios and Ilias Psinakis/ View Studio
1994	"Aima, Dakrya & Idrotas" (Blood, Sweat & Tears)	Aima, Dakrya & Idrotas	Manos Geranis
1994	"Ela Mou" (Come To Me)	Aima, Dakrya & Idrotas	Kostas Kapetanidis / Cream
1995	"Xana" (Again)	Aima, Dakrya & Idrotas	Ilias Psinakis / View Studio
1995	"Mia Fora" (Once)	Aima, Dakrya & Idrotas	Kostas Kapetanidis / Cream
1996	"Tora Arhizoun Ta Dyskola" (Now The Difficult Times Begin)	Tora Arhizoun Ta Dyskola	Vangelis Kalaïtzis / Traffic
1996	"Afiste Tin" (Leave Her Alone)	Tora Arhizoun Ta Dyskola	Art Management
1996	"Pou ke Pote" (Where and When)	Tora Arhizoun Ta Dyskola	Art Management
1998	"Theleis I Den Theleis" (Do You Want To Or Not))	Kati Apo Mena	Yorgos Lanthimos
1998	"I Kardia Mou" (My Heart)	Kati Apo Mena	Yorgos Lanthimos
1999	"Den Ehi Sidera I Kardia Sou" (Your Heart Does Not Have Metal Rails)	Kati Apo Mena	Yorgos Lanthimos
1999	"Ipirhes Panda" (You Were Always There)	Kati Apo Mena	Yorgos Lanthimos
2000	"Andexa" (I Endured)	21os Akatallilos	Yorgos Lanthimos
2000	"Se Thelo San Trelos" (I Want You Like Crazy)	21os Akatallilos	Nikos Soulis / Antidoton
2000	"Askisi Ipotagis" (Exercise of Obedience)	21os Akatallilos	Nikos Soulis / Antidoton
2000	"Delfinaki" (Little Dolphin)	21os Akatallilos	Yorgos Lanthimos
2001	"Kanoume Onira" (We're Making Dreams)	21os Akatallilos	Nikos Soulis / Antidoton
2001	"Andexa (Club Mix)" (I Endured)	21os Akatallilos (Re-release)	Yorgos Lanthimos
2001	"Disco Girl" (Greek Version)	Ola Kala	Happy Design
2002	"Ola Kala (Stereodrome Mix)" (Everything's Fine) (Greek Version)	Ola Kala	Xavier Gens / Bullring
2002	"Disco Girl" (English Version)	Ola Kala (International Edition)	Happy Design
2002	"Ola Kala (Stereodrome Mix)" (Everything's Fine) (English Version)	Ola Kala (International Edition)	Xavier Gens / Bullring
2002	"Mia Zoi Mazi" (One Life Together)	Ola Kala	Xavier Gens / Bullring
2003	"Pes Tis" (Tell Her)(Greek Version of "Feelings")	To Hrono Stamatao	Xavier Gens / Bullring
2003	"Feelings"	Ola Kala (International Edition)	Xavier Gens / Bullring
2003	"Dis Lui" (Tell Her) (French Version of Feelings	Ola Kala (French Edition)	Xavier Gens / Bullring
2004	"Shake It"	To Hrono Stamatao (Re-release)	Kostas Kapetanidis / Cream
2004	"Shake It" (International Version)	To Hrono Stamatao (Re-release)	Kostas Kapetanidis / Cream
2004	"Se Thelo San Trelos" (I Want You Like Crazy) (Duet with Philipp Kirkorov))	"Se Thelo San Trelos / Kak Sumacheshkidij Ya"	Kostas Kapetanidis / Cream
2004	"Se Thelo San Trelos" (Greek-Russian Version) (Duet with Philipp Kirkorov))	"Se Thelo San Trelos / Kak Sumacheshkidij Ya"	Kostas Kapetanidis / Cream
2004	"Kak Sumacheshkidij Ya" (Russian Version of "Se Thelo San Trelos) (Duet with Philipp Kirkorov)	"Se Thelo San Trelos / Kak Sumacheshkidij Ya"	Kostas Kapetanidis / Cream
2005	"S'eho Erotefthi (A Version)" (I'm In Love With You)	S'eho Erotefthi	Kostas Kapetanidis / Cream
2005	"S'eho Erotefthi (B Version)" (I'm In Love With You)	S'eho Erotefthi	Kostas Kapetanidis / Cream
2005	"Na M'agapas" (You Should Love Me)	S'eho Erotefthi	White Room
2005	"1000 Milia" (A Thousand Miles)	S'eho Erotefthi	Kostas Kapetanidis / Cream
2005	"Mila Tis" (Talk to her)	S'eho Erotefthi	White Room
2006	"Horis Kardia" (Without A Heart) (Greek Version of "The Blowgher's Daughter")	Live Ballads	Kostas Kapetanidis / Cream
2006	"Without You / Dodeka (LIVE)" (Without You / Twelve)	Live Ballads	Kostas Kapetanidis / Cream
2006	"O,ti Onirevomoun (LIVE)" (Whatever I Dreamt Of)	Live Ballads	Kostas Kapetanidis / Cream
2006	"Ain't No Sunshine (LIVE)"	Live Ballads	Kostas Kapetanidis / Cream
2006	"Ego Travao Zori (A Version)" (I'm Having A Hard Time)	Iparhi Agapi Edo	White Room
2007	"Ego Travao Zori (B Version)" (I'm Having A Hard Time)	Iparhi Agapi Edo	White Room
2007	"Ola Gyro Sou Gyrizoun" (Everything Revolves Around You)	Iparhi Agapi Edo	White Room
2007	"One With This World" (Duet with Doretta Papadimitriou)	Alter Ego (Original Soundtrack)	Nikolas Papadimitropoulos / Village Roadshow
2007	"Zise Ti Zoi" (Live Life)	Alter Ego (Original Soundtrack)	White Room
2007	"Suspicious Minds"	Alter Ego (Original Soundtrack)	Nikolas Papadimitropoulos / Village Roadshow
2007	"Nothing" (Duet with Doretta Papadimiriou)	Alter Ego (Original Soundtrack)	Nikolas Papadimitropoulos / Village Roadshow
2007	"Mi Mou Xanafygeis Pia" (Don't Ever Leave Me Again)	Alter Ego (Original Soundtrack)	Nikolas Papadimitropoulos / Village Roadshow
2007	"Stous 31 Dromous" (On The 31 Roads)	This Is My Live / Stous 31 Dromous (Original Soundtrack)	Leonidas Melas
2008	"+ Se Thelo" (Mad VMA 2008) (And I Want You)	Irthes	Kostas Kapetanidis / Cream
2008	"+ Se Thelo" (And I Want You)	Irthes	Giorgos Gavalos / View Studio
2008	"Irthes" (You Came)	Irthes	Kostas Kapetanidis / Cream
2009	"Irthes" (You Came)	Irthes	Yorgos Lanthimos / Laboo
2009	"This Is Our Night"	This Is Our Night	Katya Tsarik
2009	"Pio Dinata" (Greek version of "This Is Our Night)	Digital Single	Kostas Kapetanidis
2010	"Spase Ton Hrono" (Break The Time)	Parafora	Vasilis Bourandas
2010	"Emena Thes" (It's Me You Want)	Parafora	White Room
2010	"Parafora" (Madly)	Parafora	White Room
2011	"Oi Dio Mas" (The Two of Us)	Parafora	White Room
2011	"Yparxei Elpida" (There Is Hope)	Digital Single	Syllogos Elpida / White Room
2012	"Tora" (Now)	Digital Single	White Room
2013	"Mia Hara Na Pernas" (Have A Good Time)	Digital Single	White Room
2013	"Niose Ti Thelo" (Feel What I Want)	Digital Single	White Room
2013	"See"	Digital Single	Yiannis Papadakos
2015	"Fila me" (Kiss Me)	Digital Single	Thanasis Totsikas
2015	"Dio Theoi" (Two Gods)	Digital Single	Thanasis Totsikas
2017	"Zitima Zois" (Issue of Life)	Digital Single	Yiannis Micros
2018	"Ego Sta Elega" (I Told You)	Digital Single	Nicolas Dimitropoulos / White Room
2018	"Kalimera" (Good Morning)	Digital Single	Yiannis Dimolitsas
2020	"Always"	Digital Single	Kostas Karydas
2020	"Etsi einai i fasi" (This Is The Phase)	Digital Single	Yiannis Papadakos
2021	"YperAnthropos" (Superhuman)	Sta Kalytera mou	Vangelis Tsaousopoulos
2021	"Pare Me Agkalia" (Hug Me)	Sta Kalytera mou	Kostas Karydas
2021	"Sta Kalytera Mou" (At My Best)	Sta Kalytera mou	Vangelis Tsaousopoulos
2023	"Yperoxi Zoi" (Great Life)	Digital Single	Vangelis Tsaousopoulos
2023	"Ela Kai Tha Deis" (Come And See)	Digital Single	Steven Airth & Spiros Kapsilis
2023	"Ta Kaka Paidia" (The Bad Boys)	Digital Single	Kostas Karydas
2023	"Thema" (Issue)	Digital Single	Alexander Stamatiadis
2024	"Ti Matia" (What Eyes)	Digital Single	Gerasimos Papachristopoulos
2025	"Kounia Bella" (Swingin' Bella/Swingin' Trouble)	Digital Single	Bodega

== Home video releases ==
Year	Video details	Certifications (sales thresholds)
2003	Remixes: Released: 2003; Format: CD/DVD; Label: Minos EMI	GRE: Gold; CYP: Gold
2005	The Ultimate Collection: Music + Video - 1991–1996: Released: November 2005; Format: CD/DVD; Label: Universal Music/Mercury	GRE: Uncertified; CYP: Uncertified
2006	Live Ballads: Released: April 27, 2006; Format: CD/DVD; Label: Minos EMI	GRE: Platinum; CYP: Platinum
2007	Ap'Tin Arhi: I Megaliteres Epitihies: Released: August 17, 2007; Format: CD/DVD; Label: Universal Music/Mercury	GRE: Uncertified; CYP: Uncertified
2007	This Is My Live: Released: December 12, 2007; Format: CD/DVD; Label: Minos EMI	GRE: Platinum; CYP: Platinum

== Commercials ==
Company	Year	Promoting	Theme song(s)	Region	Ref.
PepsiCo	2000–2001	Pepsi campaigns and Pepsi Tour 2001	"One Life Together" (Mia Zoi Mazi)	Greece	
Vodafone	2003–2008	Mobile telecommunications campaign	"Come, Let's Make a Wish" (Ela Na Kanoume Mia Efhi)	Greece	
Sarantis Group	2004	Promotion of B.U. fragrance	"The Light"	Greece	
OPAP	2007	Voluntary blood donation campaign		Greece	
Trident	2008–2011	Various campaigns, including film sponsorship and custom gum flavor	"This Is Our Night"	Greece	
Goody's	2009–2012	ArGOODaki campaigns for "SOS Children's Villages Greece", "The Friends of the Child", "The Smile of the Child", "Hatzikyriakio Child Protection Foundation"		Greece	
Kri Kri	2010	Ice cream campaign	"I Will Go Crazy" (Tha Trelatho)	Greece	
Sprider Stores	2010–2013	Sakis Rouvas Collection (clothing line)		Greece	
Fage	2011	Advertising campaign for Ageladitsa product line		Greece	
Heineken	2012	Heineken Serenate international app		Greece	
Adidas	2012	Launch of the new football team jersey		Greece	
Haralambides-Kristis	2013	"Participation" (Symmetochi) social awareness campaign (Cyprus)		Cyprus	
Lays	2013	Lays commercial		Greece	
Elpida Foundation	2014-present	"Become a Bone Marrow Donor Volunteer" (Gine ki esy ethelontis dotis myelou ton oston)		Greece	
7Days	2014	7Days product promotions		Greece	
Coca-Cola	2015	"Kiss Happiness" campaign, celebrating 100 years of the glass bottle		Greece	
OPAP	2019	"Team of Contribution" (Omada Prosforas) campaign, contributing to the renovation of the pediatric hospitals "Agia Sofia" and "Panagiotis & Aglaia Kyriakou"		Greece	
McDonald's	2019–2023	McDonald's Greece and Cyprus campaigns		Greece, Cyprus	
GSK	2020–2022	Public awareness campaign for Meningococcal Disease type B		Greece	
Theoni Water	2022–present	Theoni Water campaigns		Greece	
Gillette	2023–present	Gillette promotional campaigns (under P&G)		Greece	
