= 8 Megales Epitihies =

8 Megales Epitihes 8 Μεγάλες Επιτυχίες

EP by Sakis Rouvas
- Released: 2006
- Recorded: 1991–1996
- Genre: Pop rock, dance-pop
- Length: 30:24
- Language: Greek
- Label: Universal Music/Mercury
- Producer: Nikos Terzis, Alexis Papadimitriou, Nikos Karvelas

Sakis Rouvas chronology
Live Ballads (2006)	8 Megales Epitihes; 8 Μεγάλες Επιτυχίες (2006)	Iparhi Agapi Edo (2006)

8 Megales Epitihies (Greek: 8 Μεγάλες Επιτυχίες; English: 8 Greatest Hits) is the first EP album by popular Greek pop rock singer Sakis Rouvas, released in 2006 by his former label Universal Music, along with the imprint of Mercury Records.

== Track listing ==
#	Title	English translation	Original album	Songwriter(s)	Production credit(s)	Time
1.	"Na Ziseis Moro Mou"	"Live My Baby" ("Happy Birthday Baby")	Min Andistekese	Vanessa Karageorgiou	Nikos Terzis	3:28
2.	"Gia Fantasou"	"Come On, Imagine"	Sakis Rouvas, Min Andistekese	Antonis Pappas	Nikos Karvelas	3:26
3.	"Fyge"	"Leave"	Gia Sena	Eleni Giannatsoulia	Alexis Papadimitriou	3:50
4.	"Par'ta"	"Take Them"	Sakis Rouvas	Giorgos Pavrianos	Nikos Terzis	4:15
5.	"Pou Pas"	"Where Are You Going"	Sakis Rouvas	Giorgos Pavrianos	Nikos Terzis	4:11
6.	"Ase Me Na Fygo"	"Let Me Leave"	Tora Arhizoun Ta Dyskola	Nikos Karvelas	Nikos Karvelas	3:13
7.	"De Tha Se Xehaso"	"I Won't Forget You"	Tora Arhizoun Ta Dyskola	Nikos Karvelas	Nikos Karvelas	4:11
8.	"Ela Mou"	"Come to Me"	Aima, Dakrya & Idrotas	Nikos Karvelas	Nikos Karvelas	4:30
