= Ap'Tin Arhi: I Megaliteres Epitihies =

Sakis Rouvas

Box set by Sakis Rouvas
- Released: 17 August 2007 (Greece)
- Recorded: 1991–1996
- Genres: Pop rock, hard rock, dance-pop, R&B, alternative hip hop, house, Latin, reggae
- Languages: Greek, English
- Labels: Universal Music Greece, Mercury
- Producers: Nikos Terzis, Alexis Papadimitriou, Nikos Karvelas

Sakis Rouvas chronology
'Ta Erotika Sakis Rouvas ' (2007)	Sakis Rouvas (2007)	This Is My Live (2007)

Ap'Tin Arhi: I Megaliteres Epitihies is the second box set album, sixth compilation album and eighteenth album overall by the Greek pop-rock singer Sakis Rouvas, released on 17 August 2007 by Universal Music Greece. The set comprises three CDs and includes a bonus DVD with thirteen videos. The audio collection is a near-complete compilation of Rouvas' first works under the PolyGram Greece record company and included hits from his first five albums (Sakis Rouvas, Min Andistekese, Gia Sena, Aima, Dakrya & Idrotas, and Tora Arhizoun Ta Dyskola) that have been divided into three categories: The Hit Singles, Love Songs, and The Remixes + Rest of the Best.

== Album information ==
The album itself comes in a special rectangular 10"×12.5" packaging, while the artwork, portraying a long-haired Rouvas as an angel is from a popular 1997 photo shoot from the magazine Out! that had become an iconic image at the time, as the music that the album contains is from that era. This compilation is the fifth official compilation from Rouvas' former label and thus includes much of the same music as the other four compilations from Universal Music. However, the past releases have each included a specific theme in their song selection. Me Kommeni Tin Anasa, Rouvas' first greatest hits album, was a collection of a selection of his most successful airplay singles along with remixes and two previously unreleased tracks (One of which was a remix and the other a cover of The Chi-Lites hit "Oh Girl"), the box set Sakis Rouvas was a near-complete audio collection, The Ultimate Collection: Music + Video - 1991–1996 was another collection of the same most successful airplay singles, but to include a bonus DVD (exactly like the one on this album) and Ta Erotika Sakis Rouvas was a collection of his most successful love songs and ballads. However, this collection in one manner collectively sums up the other albums' material and is presented in a special packaging as a collector's item, one decade after Rouvas signed a contract with Minos EMI.

== Track listing ==
CD 1: The Hit Singles

#	Title	English translation	Original album	Songwriter(s)	Production credit(s)	Time
1.	"Ase Me Na Fygo"	"Let Me Leave"	Tora Arhizoun Ta Dyskola	Nikos Karvelas	Nikos Karvelas	3:13
2.	"Tora Arhizoun Ta Dyskola"	"Now The Difficult Times Begin"	Tora Arhizoun Ta Dyskola	Natalia Germanou	Nikos Karvelas	2:58
3.	"Afiste Tin"	"Leave Her Alone"	Tora Arhizoun Ta Dyskola	Apostolos Diavolikis	Nikos Karvelas	3:33
4.	"Pou Ke Pote"	"Where And When"	Tora Arhizoun Ta Dyskola	Nikos Karvelas	Nikos Karvelas	3:17
5.	"Ela Mou"	"Come To Me"	Aima, Dakrya & Idrotas	Nikos Karvelas	Nikos Karvelas	4:26
6.	"Symplegma Idipodio"	"Oedipus Complex"	Aima, Dakrya & Idrotas	Nikos Karvelas	Nikos Karvelas	4:15
7.	"Den To Vlepeis"	"You Don't See It"	Aima, Dakrya & Idrotas	Marilena Panayiotopoulou	Nikos Karvelas	3:50
8.	"Efyges"	"You Left"	Aima, Dakrya & Idrotas	Nikos Karvelas	Nikos Karvelas	4:07
9.	"Kane Me"	"Make Me"	Gia Sena	Eleni Yiannatsoulia	Alexis Papadimitriou	3:41
10.	"Xehase To"	"Forget It"	Gia Sena	Eleni Yiannatsoulia	Alexis Papadimitriou	3:42
11.	"Tha S'ekdikitho"	"I Will Seek Revenge Upon You"	Gia Sena	Natalia Germanou	Alexis Papadimitriou	2:59
12.	"Min Andistekese"	"Don't Resist"	Min Andistekese	Natalia Germanou	Nikos Terzis	4:09
13.	"Gyrna"	"Come Back"	Min Andistekese	Vanessa Karageorgiou	Nikos Terzis	3:37
14.	"Me Kommeni Tin Anasa"	"Breathless"	Min Andistekese	Antonis Pappas	Nikos Terzis	3:43
15.	"Na Ziseis Moro Mou"	"Live My Baby" ["Happy Birthday, Baby"]	Min Andistekese	Vanessa Karageorgiou	Nikos Terzis	3:28
16.	"Yia Fantasou"	"Come On, Imagine"	Sakis Rouvas/Min Andistekese	Antonis Pappas	Nikos Terzis	3:26
17.	"Mia Vrohi"	"A Rain"	Sakis Rouvas	Georgos Pavrianos	Nikos Terzis	4:12
18.	"1992"	–	Sakis Rouvas	Georgos Pavrianos	Nikos Terzis	3:15

CD 2: Love Songs

#	Title	English translation	Original album	Songwriter(s)	Production credit(s)	Time
1.	"Gia Sena"	"For You"	Gia Sena	Eleni Yiannatsoulia	Alexis Papadimitriou	1:33
2.	"Xana"	"Again"	Aima, Dakrya & Idrotas	Nikos Karvelas	Nikos Karvelas	4:31
3.	"Aima, Dakrya & Idrotas"	"Blood, Sweat & Tears"	Aima, Dakrya & Idrotas	Nikos Karvelas	Nikos Karvelas	5:19
4.	"Mia Fora"	"Once"	Aima, Dakrya & Idrotas	Marilena Panayiotopoulou	Nikos Karvelas	3:39
5.	"Mi M'agapiseis"	"Don't Love Me"	Tora Arhizoun Ta Dyskola	Natalia Germanou	Nikos Karvelas	3:54
6.	"De Tha Se Xehaso"	"I Won't Forget You"	Tora Arhizoun Ta Dyskola	Nikos Karvelas	Alexis Papadimitriou	4:11
7.	"Kapote Tha 'Maste Mazi"	"Sometime We'll Be Together"	Tora Arhizoun Ta Dyskola	Natalia Germanou	Nikos Karvelas	4:12
8.	"Ime Hamenos"	"I Am Lost"	Tora Arhizoun Ta Dyskola	Natalia Germanou	Nikos Karvelas	3:52
9.	"Fyge"	"Leave"	Gia Sena	Eleni Yiannatsoulia	Alexis Papadimitriou	3:50
10.	"To Xero Ise Moni"	"I Know You Are Alone"	Gia Sena	Eleni Yiannatsoulia	Alexis Papadimitriou	4:09
11.	"Oso Iparheis"	"As Long As You Exist"	Gia Sena		Alexis Papadimitriou	4:30
12.	"Ego S'agapo"	"I Love You"	Sakis Rouvas/Min Andistekese	Lila Ranou	Nikos Terzis	4:05
13.	"Dose Mou Mia Nyhta"	"Give Me One Night"	Min Antistekese	Natalia Germanou	Nikos Terzis	3:15
14.	"Pseftika"	"Fake"	Min Andistekese	Nikos Terzis	Nikos Terzis	3:36
15.	"Mia Parousia"	"A Presence"	Min Andistekese	Nikos Terzis	Nikos Terzis	3:58
16.	"Par'ta"	"Take Them"	Sakis Rouvas	Georgos Pavrianos	Nikos Terzis	4:15
17.	"Gia Sena"	"For You"	Gia Sena	Alexis Papadimitriou	Alexis Papadimitriou	0:35
18.	"Oh Girl"	–	Me Kommeni Tin Anasa	Barbara Acklin, Eugene Record	Eugene Record	3:14

CD 3: The Remixes + Rest of the Best

#	Title	English translation	Original album	Songwriter(s)	Production credit(s)	Time
1.	"Tora Arhizoun Ta Dyskola" (7" Latin Dance Mix)	"Now The Difficult Times Begin"	Tora Arhizoun Ta Dyskola (Re-release)	Natalia Germanou	Nikos Karvelas	4:39
2.	"Afiste Tin" (Dance Mix)	"Leave Her Alone"	Tora Arhizoun Ta Dyskola (Re-release)	Apostolos Diavolikis	Nikos Karvelas	3:35
3.	"Pou Ke Pote" (7" Mix)	"Where And When"	Me Kommeni Tin Anasa	Nikos Karvelas	Nikos Karvelas	4:07
4.	"Tora Arhizoun Ta Dyskola" (Club Mix)	"Now The Difficult Times Begin"	Tora Arhizoun Ta Dyskola (Re-release)	Natalia Germanou	Nikos Karvelas	6:46
5.	"Afiste Tin" (Extended 12" Mix)	"Leave Her Alone"	Tora Arhizoun Ta Dyskola (Re-release)	Nikos Karvelas	Nikos Karvelas	5:03
6.	"Xana" (Reggae Mix)	"Again"	Me Kommeni Tin Anasa	Nikos Karvelas	Nikos Karvelas	3:48
7.	"Diaforetikos"	"Different"	Tora Arhizoun Ta Dyskola	Nikos Karvelas	Nikos Karvelas	3:44
8.	"Pos Ta Kataferes"	"How Did You Manage?"	Tora Arhizoun Ta Dyskola	Nikos Karvelas	Nikos Karvelas	2:47
9.	"Grothia"	"Fist"	Aima, Dakrya & Idrotas	Nikos Karvelas	Nikos Karvelas	4:23
10.	"Koukla"	"Doll"	Gia Sena	Eleni Yiannatsoulia	Alexis Papadimitriou	3:30
11.	"Agrios Erotas"	"Wild Love"	Gia Sena	Eleni Yiannatsoulia	Alexis Papadimitriou	3:34
12.	"Paraisthiseis"	"Dillusions"	Gia Sena	Eleni Yiannatsoulia	Alexis Papadimitriou	3:10
13.	"Ola Ine Mia Fygi"	"Everything Is An Escape"	Min Andistekese	Takis Karnatsos	Nikos Terzis	3:47
14.	"Ela Sopa"	"Come, Be Silent"	Min Andistekese	Vanessa Karageorgiou	Nikos Terzis	3:29
15.	"To Proto Mou Lathos"	"My First Mistake"	Min Andistekese	Vanessa Karageorgiou	Nikos Terzis	3:09
16.	"Yiati Etsi M'aresi"	"Because That's How I Like It"	Sakis Rouvas	Georgos Pavrianos	Nikos Terzis	3:34
17.	"Des! Pes!"	"Look! Speak!"	Sakis Rouvas	Georgos Pavrianos	Nikos Terzis	3:44
18.	"Ta Trela Mas Onira"	"Our Crazy Dreams"	Sakis Rouvas	Georgos Pavrianos	Nikos Terzis	3:41

DVD

#	Title	Original album	Screenwriter(s)	Director(s)
1.	"Ela Mou"	Aima, Dakrya & Idrotas	Elias Psinakis	Kostas Kapetanidis/Cream
2.	"Tora Arhizoun Ta Dyskola"	Tora Arhizoun Ta Dyskola	Elias Psinakis	Vangelis Kalaïtzis
3.	"Afiste Tin"	Tora Arhizoun Ta Dyskola	N/A	Art Management
4.	"Aima, Dakrya & Idrotas"	Aima, Dakrya & Idrotas	Elias Psinakis	Manos Geranis
5.	"Pou Ke Pote"	Tora Arhizoun Ta Dyskola	N/A	Art Management
6.	"Min Andistekese"	Min Andistekese	N/A	Etien Theotokis
7.	"Par'ta"	Sakis Rouvas	N/A	Nikos Soulis/Antidoton
8.	"Kane Me"	Gia Sena	N/A	Georgos and Elias Psinakis/View Studio
9.	"To Xero Ise Moni"	Gia Sena	N/A	Georgos and Elias Psinakis/View Studio
10.	"Xehase To"	Gia Sena	N/A	Georgos and Elias Psinakis/View Studio
11.	"Xana"	Aima, Dakrya & Idrotas	N/A	Elias Psinakis/View Studio
12.	"1992"	Sakis Rouvas	N/A	Nikos Soulis/Antidoton
13.	"Mia Fora"	Aima, Dakrya & Idrotas	Elias Psinakis	Kostas Kapetanidis/Cream
