= Stous 31 Dromous (song) =

Single by Sakis Rouvas

from the album Stous 31 Dromous (Original Soundtrack), This Is My Live
- Released: 30 September 2007
- Recorded: September 2009; Vox Recording Studios (Athens, Greece)
- Length: 3:06
- Label: EMI/Minos
- Songwriters: Dimitris Kontopoulos, Viki Gerothodorou
- Producer: Dimitris Kontopoulos

Sakis Rouvas singles chronology
"Suspicious Minds" (2007)	"Stous 31 Dromous" (2007)	"+ Se Thelo" (2008)

"Stous 31 Dromous" (Greek: "Στους 31 Δρόμους"; English: On the 31 roads) is a song by Greek pop/rock singer Sakis Rouvas. The uptempo ballad was written by Dimitris Kontopoulos with lyrics by Viki Gerothodorou as the theme song of the Mega Channel television series of the same name as well as serving as the sole single from his live album This Is My Live. The song was released to radio stations in Greece and Cyprus on 30 September 2007, while the music video was shot in Brooklyn, New York.

== Background and recording ==
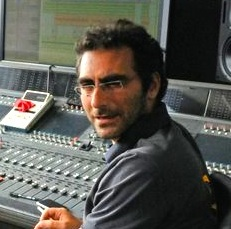
Dimitris Kontopoulos was the composer of the song.

"Stous 31 Dromous" contains music written by Dimitris Kontopoulos and lyrics by Viki Gerothodorou who had first collaborated with Rouvas as of To Hrono Stamatao (2003) and Iparhi Agapi Edo (2006), respectively and had jointly written Rouvas' dance hit "Ola Gyro Sou Gyrizoun. It was recorded at Vox Recording Studios. The song was released on 30 September, the same day as the series premiere, although the series was then cancelled after eleven episodes. It was featured on its soundtrack, while it also served as the only single on Rouvas' second live album This Is My Live. The album includes the original version of the song as well as a rock version as a bonus track. It is his follow-up single to his cover of "Suspicious Minds", which was part of his film and soundtrack project Alter Ego.

The song was created as the theme to the Greek-American drama series of the same name that aired on Mega Channel. According to Espresso News in a publication made in June 2007, the show's creator, Andreas Georgiou, had originally asked Rouvas to star in the highly anticipated series. Although Rouvas liked the show's concept and the producers were eager to have him feature, Rouvas eventually refused the offer as at the time he was doing work on his feature film debut Alter Ego and instead Georgiou himself took over the role. Despite this, in July the producers asked Rouvas, who was still living in and finishing business in Los Angeles, to perform the entire soundtrack. Rouvas seemingly did not accept this proposal, instead opting to perform only the title track.

Inspired by the show's "modern 'American Dream'" theme, the song was written to capture these emotions, such as those of the main character, Christina (Sofia Karvela) moving to New York from Greece with new hopes but encountering some misfortunes.

== Composition and theme ==
The song's theme is about going on journeys and creating dreams, both of which comedian Lakis Lazopoulos cited as recurring themes in Rouvas music during their collaboration on 21os Akatallilos (2000).

== Chart performance ==
"Stous 31 Dromous" received some airplay upon release, although it did not prove to be as successful as Rouvas' recent or forthcoming singles. Following the cancellation of the series, the song eventually fell off the charts.

== Critical reception ==
Critical reaction to the song was mostly positive, with Espresso News describing it as an "incredible piece". In reviewing This Is My Live, Christianna Pantelatou of Music Corner stated that "Sakis [...] within 22 older songs (and the brand new 'Stous 31 dromous') gives us one of the most lively and bright evenings." As Rouvas' appearance in the Eurovision Song Contest 2009 approached, the Greek members of OGAE chose the song to participate as the Greek entry in the OGAE Song Contest. At the contest, held in Zaragosa, Spain on 25 October 2008, the song reached third place with 130 points, placing behind Croatia and the United Kingdom.

== Music video ==
The music video was directed by Greek-American director Leonidas Melas, the show's director, making it the first collaboration between him and Rouvas. It was shot in New York City, the show's setting, sometime in September. The video opens with the sun shining on the New York skyline. Rouvas proceeds walking briskly as if he has a destination in mind, wandering all over New York City, including the ghettos. Scenes of Rouvas constantly alternate with positive or humorous scenes from the series. Towards the end Rouvas reaches his destination, which is revealed to be the Brooklyn Bridge. The video ends with Rouvas looking out to the skyline as the sun sets.

In the DVD of This Is My Live, bonus footage is included, featuring backstage scenes from the video and Rouvas greeting fans living in the United States.

== Live performances ==
Following the song's release, Rouvas added it to setlists, beginning with his world tour with Antonis Remos and furthermore for his Politia concert series in Thessaloniki with Peggy Zina in the spring of 2008. Rouvas also performed the track in its entirety on the three-stop Kalokairino Randevou me ton Saki Tour, while in his later concert tours and series, such as STARZ, the Sakis Live Tour, and The S Club he performed only a portion of it. For his live performances, Rouvas opted for the rock version of the song, accompanied by a live band.

== Personnel ==
- Sakis Rouvas – executive producer, vocals
- Dimitris Kontopoulos – arranger, producer, programmer, songwriter, synths
- Viki Gerothodorou – songwriter
- Liana Papalexi – backing vocals
- Kostas Gianniris – backing vocals
- Aris Binis – recording engineer, mixer

== Release history ==
Region	Date	Label	Format
Greece	30 September 2007	Minos EMI	Radio single, promo single
Greece	9 November 2007	Minos EMI	Music video
Cyprus	30 September 2007	Minos EMI	Radio single
