= Ta Erotika (Sakis Rouvas album) =

Compilation album by Sakis Rouvas
- Released: 10 February 2007
- Recorded: 1991–1996
- Genre: Soft rock, blues
- Language: Greek
- Label: Universal Music Greece, Mercury
- Producer: Nikos Terzis, Alexis Papadimitriou, Nikos Karvelas

Sakis Rouvas chronology
Iparhi Agapi Edo (2000)	Ta Erotika (2007)	Ap'Tin Arhi: I Megaliteres Epitihies (2007)

Ta Erotika Sakis Rouvas (Greek: Τα Ερωτικά; English: Love songs) is the first love song collection and fifth compilation album by Greek pop-rock singer-songwriter Sakis Rouvas and is part of the Universal Music Greece series Ta Erotika. It was released on 10 February 2007 and comprises songs from his first five albums released under the former PolyGram Records Greece. The album comprises 18 tracks with a love oriented theme.

== Track listing ==
1. "Xana"
2. "Mi M'agapiseis"
3. "Aima, Dakrya & Idrotas"
4. "Afiste Tin"
5. "Par'ta"
6. "To Xero Ise Moni"
7. "Kapote Tha 'Maste Mazi"
8. "Ime Hamenos"
9. "Mia Fora"
10. "Ego S'agapo"
11. "Fyge"
12. "De Tha Se Xehaso"
13. "Pseftika"
14. "Mia Vrohi"
15. "Oso Iparheis"
16. "Dose Mou Mia Nyhta"
17. "Spasmeni Klidaria"
18. "Yia Sena"
