= Theleis I Den Theleis =

"Theleis I Den Theleis" "Θέλεις Ή Δεν Θέλεις"

Single by Sakis Rouvas

from the album Kati Apo Mena
- B-side: "Ipirhes Panda", "Poso Thelo Na 'Xeres"; "Tha Mou Pari Kairo"
- Released: May 1998
- Recorded: 1998; Studio Sierra
- Genre: Dance-pop
- Length: 4:20
- Label: Minos EMI
- Songwriter: Vangelis Konstantinidis
- Producer: Vangelis Yannopoulos

Sakis Rouvas singles chronology
"Par'ta" (1991)	"Theleis I Den Theleis" "Θέλεις Ή Δεν Θέλεις" (1998)	"Disco Girl" (2002)

"Theleis I Den Theleis" (Greek: "Θέλεις Ή Δεν Θέλεις"; English: "Do You Want to or Not") is a song released by Greek singer Sakis Rouvas in May 1998 by Minos EMI, written by composer Giorgos Theofanous with lyrics by Vangelis Konstantinidis, and produced by Vangelis Yannopoulos. It was released in Greece and Cyprus as a four track CD single. MAD TV ranked it as the best song of 1998.

== Background ==
=== Production history ===
As of late 1997, Rouvas had signed a new contract with Greek record-label giant Minos EMI in favour of his former PolyGram Records. Following the concert for the Greco-Turkish peace and reconciliation that Rouvas gave on the Green Line in Cyprus with the Turkish artist Burak Kut, there was much controversy surrounding Rouvas. The concert had an ill-fated date of May 19, 1997, which coincided with a day of remembrance for the genocide of Pontian people by "Young Turks" army. Although many attended the concert and it was a commercial success, and Rouvas was honored with the International Abdi Ipekçi Prize for his co-operation and effort, fighting broke out into the audience leaving many youth wounded. Opposing critics believed that this would be the end of Rouvas' career and the phenomenon of his fans. Rouvas and manager Elias Psinakis left Greece for the United States for many months at a time, meanwhile in Greece he was slowly disappearing from the front-pages, as the withdrawal helped the criticisms fade.

Rouvas returned to Greece, ready to re-launch his career, and started to look for a new record deal after his record company (Universal Music - Polygram at that time) didn't seem to be in favour of a new released album. Makis Matsas, chief executive officer of Minos-Emi Greece along with one of his A&R manager, Vangelis Yannopoulos, take the odds and signed the artist. The first difficulty that Vangelis Yannopoulos had in front of him was to convince composers and lyricists to work on Sakis Rouvas' new release. Well-known composer Phoebus was approached and declined. Then came the idea to fight back the Cypriot problem with a ... Cypriot composer. Vangelis worked a lot in that period with Giorgos Theofanous whom he had produced some golden albums with (Evridiki). After having obtained the "go on", he then turned to another Vangelis (Konstantinidis), a well-known lyricist he had also worked with on other golden albums by prominent Greek artists (Dantis, Stefanos Korkolis, etc.). Konstantinidis was hesitant due to the negative image that had been associated with Rouvas and delayed his response. Konstantinidis stated that Yannopoulos had called him for a final time and asked "Do you want to or not, Vangeli?", which the lyricist claimed was the inspiration for his first hit with Rouvas. Rouvas' collaboration with Konstantinidis would continue on to future albums (with songs like "Andexa" - an hymn and another production of Vangelis Yannopoulos, and composed by newcomer Stratos Diamandis - a sound engineer assistant on this single), also achieving success, while the release of the single would begin his collaboration with rock/folk singer Stelios Rokkos, who wrote the song "Tha Mou Pari Kairo". Rokkos came to work for this album as a good friend of Sakis, and declared himself to be a big supporter of Rouvas, as he constantly promoted him during his time of receiving very harsh treatment by the media.

The release of the single, which was his first new material since 1996's Tora Arhizoun Ta Dyskola, proved to revive the artist's career upon returning to Greece, with high sales and sold-out concert performances. The single as did its album, featured a more mature sound from Rouvas than previously which was the bet Makis Matsas and Vangelis Yannopoulos along with Sakis Rouvas' manager Elias Psinakis took and won together.

=== Lyrical content and style ===
The song is of a 1990s dance-pop style with a strong beat, featuring a lot of bass. It has a large range in dynamics, a style commonly used in many Rouvas songs. Lyrically, the song sees Rouvas asking his lover "Do you want to or not? You will tell me tonight" and asking if she has any room in her heart for him or if she just simply likes the chase. The pre-chorus states "However, at this moment, bruised egos ask with a voice". He is asking that she decide because he has grown tired of her games and of worrying at nights. He commands that she "cut the mystery", saying that he has gone through with the love adventure, and her insanity, only to fall in love with her and has become frustrated.

The other three songs from the single also previewed the general idea of Rouvas' forthcoming album, as they experimented with much more different styles in popular music than Rouvas had sung in past years. A good example of this is the song "Tha Mou Pari Kairo" which contained an Eastern oriental flavor, brought by the skills of Rokkos who is known for infusing the two very different genres of rock and laïka. "Poso Thelo Na 'Xeres" is a serious ballad, while "Ipirhes Panda", a power-ballad with jazz elements (both written by Giorgos Theofanous), after the release of the full-length album would go on to become one of the artist's most-recognizable songs. However, the song was not the promoted one as the record company thought that a dance song would be more popular.

== Track listing ==
#	Title	English translation	Songwriters	Production credit	Time
1.	"Ipirhes Panda"	"You Were Always There"	Giorgos Theofanous - Vangelis Konstantinidis	Vangelis Yannopoulos	3:51
2.	"Theleis I Den Theleis"	"Do You Want to or Not"	Giorgos Theofanous - Vangelis Konstantinidis	Vangelis Yannopoulos	4:20
3.	"Poso Thelo, Na 'Xeres"	"How I Want You to Know"	Giorgos Theofanous - Vangelis Konstantinidis	Vangelis Yannopoulos	3:35
4.	"Tha Mou Pari Kairo"	"It Will Take Me Some Time"	Stelios Rokkos	Stelios Rokkos	4:05

== Music video ==
The music video of the song kicked off Rouvas' successful collaboration with photographer and director Yorgos Lanthimos, who would go on to create the majority of Rouvas' most acclaimed videos over the next two years. Lanthimos won in 2008, the "Off-Cannes" Palme for one of his movies and was nominated for an Oscar in 2010. Similar to some of Rouvas' past videos, the video features sexual content, especially for the time of its release that earned it some criticism, while also making it very popular. It contains four scenes, all on one setting, which is an outdoor patio. The video starts by showing quick flashes of various objects, namely a toy gun, a polaroid camera and photographs, a statue, and beach toys. Throughout the video, flashes of Rouvas singing into the camera can be seen while half-naked, playing around in a small outdoor pool. In another recurring scene, Rouvas' is lying down while shirtless while water continuously splashes over his torso, while the camera angle is right above him, making it appear as he is being trapped by a glass effect. In the second half of the video, Rouvas can be seen dancing on the patio wearing an open purple T-shirt. The other scenes feature Rouvas playing around with two young women who have very similar features, although one is blonde and the other is brunette. In one scene, they are dressed in bikinis, feather boas, stilettos and diamond jewelry and are drinking champagne, while in the other they are dressed more casually. Rouvas blindfolds the two women and sends them off to search for him while he is watching. During the bridge of the song, Rouvas places the brunette woman in front of the target and aims to take a shooting stand, finally shooting her with the plastic gun on the right side of her chest. He then picks up a golf club and shoots the ball, while afterward, he is brought to lie down while the same woman stands over him, taking numerous polaroid photographs while he poses both clothed and in a bathing suit. The video plays with the effects of using fast flashes and off-angle shots in combination with some slow-motion and rewinding shots, such as Rouvas slightly getting out and going fully back into the pool, which is replayed many times.

The video for "Theleis I Den Theleis" would set an example of Lanthimos' work with Rouvas, featuring highly sexual content, as did the photo shoot of the album 21os Akatallilos and subsequent videos such as "Andexa". This video and ones similar played a part in Rouvas' recognition by media as a sex symbol, while it featured new concepts that helped shape the still young Greek video industry, as "Theleis I Den Theleis" was amongst the most-played videos on MAD TV during the channel's first years of airing.

== Release history ==
Region	Date	Label	Format
Greece	May 1998	Minos EMI	Radio single, Promo single
Greece	June 1998	Minos EMI	CD single
Cyprus	June 1998	Minos EMI	CD single

== Credits ==
=== Production ===
- Record Producer: Vangelis Yannopoulos
- Composers: Giorgos Theofanous (Track 1,2,3), Stelios Rokkos (Track 4)
- Lyricists: Vangelis Konstantinidis (Track 1,2,3), Stelios Rokkos (Track 4)
- Arrangement: Giorgos Theofanous (Track 1,2,3), Haris Andreadis (Track 4),
- Digital programming: Vasilis Nikolopoulos (Track 1,2,3), Elias Ahladiotis (Track 4)
- Released by: Minos EMI-A.E.

=== Personnel ===
- Vocals: Sakis Rouvas (lead), Christina Argyri, Katerina Kyriakou, Alex Panayi, Kostas Hrysis with Giorgos Theofanous and Vangelis Yannopoulos (backing)
- Guitars: Savvas Christodoulou
- Bass: Nikos Vardis
- Additional guitars: Mihalis Armagos
- Drums: Andreas Mouzakis
- Percussion: "Mohammed"
- Keyboards: Giorgos Theofanous (tracks 1, 2, 3) and Haris Andreadis (track 4)
- Photography: Yorgos Lanthimos
- Recording and mixing: Vasilis Nikolopoulos with Stratos Diamandis at Power Music Studio
- Vocal recording: Tasos Bakasietas, Vangelis Papadopoulos, and Antonis Papathanasiou at Studio Sierra
- Mastering: Giannis Ioannidis, Petros Siakavelas-Digital Press Hellas
- Transfer: Theodoris Hrysanthopoulos-Fabelsound
- Management: Elias Psinakis

== Reception ==
Critical reaction to the song was mostly positive, although many critics doubted that Rouvas would make a significant comeback. Others were not impressed by the modern dance style and sexual content. Although he had stepped down from the stage for many months, he still maintained a strong fanbase who were anxious for a new release, also contributing to the demand of the song. The single was very well received by the commercial audience who quickly brought it to the top of the charts for 10 weeks due to very fast sales.

== Chart performance ==
The single "Theleis I Den Theleis" was very successful in both Greece and Cyprus, peaking at number 1 on both countries' charts, while the title track also managed to peak at number 1 on the Greek Airplay Chart, becoming a huge hit of the 1990s, with the song itself and its video receiving a lot of airplay. Its feature on the album Kati Apo Mena helped the album debut at number 1 and stay there for 10 weeks, as well. Subsequently, the song "Ipirhes Panda" from the CD single was also released as a radio single, being the last single from the album and peaking at number 1 on the airplay chart for many weeks. The two songs from this single have been hits that have had defining impact on Rouvas' career, being two of his most popular songs that the artist still performs regularly to date.

=== Charts and certifications ===
Chart	Providers	Peak position	Certification
Greek Singles Chart	IFPI	1	Gold
Greek Airplay Chart	IFPI	1	Gold
Cypriot Airplay Chart	All Records	1	Gold
