= The Ultimate Collection: Music + Video – 1991–1996 =

Compilation album by Sakis Rouvas
- Released: 2005
- Recorded: 1991–1996
- Genre: Pop rock
- Language: Greek
- Label: Universal Music Greece, Mercury
- Producer: Nikos Terzis, Alexis Papadimitriou, Nikos Karvelas

Sakis Rouvas chronology
To Hrono Stamatao (Re-release) (2002)	The Ultimate Collection: Music + Video – 1991–1996 (2005)	S'eho Erotefthi (2005)

The Ultimate Collection: Music + Video – 1991–1996 is the second video album, third compilation album and twelfth album overall by Greek pop-rock singer-songwriter Sakis Rouvas. The album comprises two discs, one CD and one DVD, released in early 2005 by Universal Music Greece and comprises songs from his first five albums released under the former PolyGram Records Greece. The album contains 20 of his first hit singles and 13 of his music videos.

== Track listing ==
CD

1. "Par'ta"
2. "1992"
3. "Gyrna"
4. "Min Andistekese"
5. "Yia Fantasou"
6. "Me Kommeni Tin Anasa"
7. "Na Ziseis Moro Mou"
8. "Kane Me"
9. "To Xero Ise Moni"
10. "Xehase To"
11. "Aima, Dakrya & Idrotas"
12. "Xana"
13. "Ela Mou"
14. "Symplegma Idipodio"
15. "Grothia"
16. "Tora Arhizoun Ta Dyskola"
17. "Ase Me Na Fygo"
18. "Mi M'agapiseis"
19. "Afiste Tin"
20. "Pou ke Pote"

DVD

1. "Ela Mou"
2. "Tora Arhizoun Ta Dyskola"
3. "Afiste Tin"
4. "Aima, Dakrya & Idrotas"
5. "Pou ke Pote"
6. "Min Andistekese"
7. "Par'ta"
8. "Kane Me"
9. "To Xero Ise Moni"
10. "Xehase To"
11. "Xana"
12. "1992"
13. "Mia Fora"
