= Sta Kalitera Mou =

Sta Kalitera Mou Στα Καλύτερά Μου

Studio album by Sakis Rouvas
- Released: 28 May 2021
- Length: 36:28
- Language: Greek
- Label: Minos EMI
- Producer: Phoebus

Sakis Rouvas chronology
Parafora (2010)	Sta Kalitera Mou; Στα Καλύτερά Μου (2021)

Singles from Sta Kalitera Mou
- 1. "Yperanthropos" Released: 29 January 2021; 2. "Pare Me Agkalia" Released: 21 May 2021; 3. "Sta Kalitera Mou" Released: 17 September 2021; 4. "Yperochi Zoi" Released: 19 March 2022

Sta Kalitera Mou (Greek: Στα Καλύτερά Μου, pronounced [sta kaˈlitera mu]; English: At My Best) is the 14th album by Greek recording artist Sakis Rouvas. It was released by Minos EMI, a Universal Music Company, in Greece and Cyprus on 28 May 2021 and is his first album since 2010. The album features 10 songs composed by Phoebus, 19 years after their last collaboration on the album Ola Kala.

== Track listing ==
All tracks are written by Phoebus

Sta Kalitera Mou track listing
No.	Title	Producer(s)	Length
1.	"Sta Kalitera Mou" (Στα Καλύτερα Μου; "At My Best")	Phoebus	3:41
2.	"To Aspro T-Shirt" (Το Άσπρο T-Shirt; "The White T-Shirt")	Phoebus	3:41
3.	"Pare Me Agkalia" (Πάρε Με Αγκαλιά; "Take Me in Your Arms")	Phoebus	3:53
4.	"Yperochi Zoi" (Υπέροχη Ζωή; "Wonderful Life")	Phoebus	3:35
5.	"Sokolata" (Σοκολάτα; "Chocolate")	Phoebus	3:17
6.	"Aspirini" (Ασπιρίνη; "Aspirin")	Phoebus	3:16
7.	"Pausipona" (Παυσίπονα; "Painkillers")	Phoebus	4:00
8.	"Gymnoi Sti Vrochi" (Γυμνοί Στη Βροχή; "Naked in the Rain")	Phoebus	3:29
9.	"Alyti Exisosi" (Άλυτη Εξίσωση; "Unsolved Equation")	Phoebus	3:27
10.	"Yperanthropos" (Υπεράνθρωπος; "Superhuman")	Phoebus	4:09
Total length:			36:28

== Charts ==
=== Weekly charts ===
Weekly chart performance for Sta Kalytera Mou
Chart (2021)	Peak position
Greek Albums (IFPI Greece)	1

=== Year-end charts ===
Year-end chart performance for Sta Kalytera Mou
Chart (2021)	Position
Greek Albums (IFPI Greece)	1
