= Ola Kala =

Ola Kala Όλα Καλά

Studio album by Sakis Rouvas
- Released: June 16, 2002
- Recorded: 2001–2002, 2003
- Genre: Pop rock, funk rock, reggae, Latin pop, dance-pop
- Language: Greek, English
- Label: Universal Music France/ULM
- Producer: Desmond Child, Jules Gondar, Nathan Malki

Sakis Rouvas chronology
21os Akatallilos (2000)	Ola Kala; Όλα Καλά (2002)	To Hrono Stamatao (2003)

Singles from Ola Kala
- 1. "Disco Girl" Released: December 17, 2001; 2. "Ola Kala"; 3. "Mia Zoi Mazi"; 4. "Disco Girl (English Version)" Released: June 17, 2002; 5. "Ola Kala (English Version)"; 6. "The Light"; 7. "Feelings"; 8. "Dis lui"

Ola Kala (Greek: Όλα Καλά; Everything's Fine) is the eighth studio album and first international album featuring a number of English language songs by popular Greek singer-songwriter Sakis Rouvas, originally released on June 16, 2002, in Greece and Cyprus by Minos EMI. International songwriter and producer Desmond Child is the main producer of the album. The album was certified Gold eleven days after its release in Greece, while it eventually was certified Platinum shortly after.

== Track listing ==
=== Original release ===
No.	Title	Lyrics	Music	Length
1.	"Ola Kala" (Everything's fine)	Phoebus	Phoebus, Desmond Child
2.	"Oso Zo" (As long as I live)	Vangelis Konstantinidis	Desmond Child
3.	"Mia Zoi Mazi" (A life together)	Vangelis Konstantinidis	Desmond Child
4.	"Kati Omorfo" (Something beautiful)	Vangelis Konstantinidis	Desmond Child
5.	"Iparheis" (You exist)	Phoebus	Phoebus
6.	"Aspro Mavro" (White-black)	Phoebus	Phoebus
7.	"Pou Tha Pas (World of Make Believe)" (Where will you go)	Natalia Germanou	Desmond Child
8.	"Disco Girl"	Phoebus	Phoebus, Desmond Child
9.	"Tha Erthi I Stigmi (Taste the Tears)" (The moment will come)	Natalia Germanou	Diane Warren
10.	"An M' Akous" (If you can hear me)	Vangelis Konstantinidis	Desmond Child

† "Tha Erthi I Stigmi", written by Natalia Germanou, is a Greek version of the song "Taste the Tears", originally released by Jason Raize and composed by Diane Warren
†† "Pou Tha Pas", written by Natalia Germanou, is a Greek version of the song "World of Make Believe", released by 3rd Faze and composed by Desmond Child

=== Re-release and international release ===
No.	Title	Lyrics	Music	Length
1.	"Ola Kala" (Everything's fine)	Phoebus	Phoebus, Desmond Child
2.	"Oso Zo" (As long as I live)	Vangelis Konstantinidis	Desmond Child
3.	"Mia Zoi Mazi" (A life together)	Vangelis Konstantinidis	Desmond Child
4.	"Kati Omorfo" (Something beautiful)	Vangelis Konstantinidis	Desmond Child
5.	"Iparheis" (You exist)	Phoebus	Phoebus
6.	"Aspro Mavro" (White-black)	Phoebus	Phoebus
7.	"Pou Tha Pas (World of Make Believe)" (Where will you go)	Natalia Germanou	Desmond Child
8.	"Disco Girl"	Phoebus	Phoebus, Desmond Child
9.	"Tha Erthi I Stigmi (Taste the Tears)" (The moment will come)	Natalia Germanou	Diane Warren
10.	"An M' Akous" (If you can hear me)	Vangelis Konstantinidis	Desmond Child
11.	"Ola Kala (English Version)" (Everything's Fine)	Phoebus, Desmond Child	Phoebus, Desmond Child
12.	"Disco Girl (English Version)"	Andreas Carlsson	Phoebus, Desmond Child
13.	"The Light" (English version of "Mia Zoi Mazi")	Desmond Child, Eric Bazilian	Desmond Child, Eric Bazilian

† In some markets:

"Tha Erthi I Stigmi", the Greek version of the song "Taste the Tears" originally released by Jason Raize and composed by Diane Warren, is replaced by his English cover of "Taste the Tears"
"Pou tha Pas", the Greek version of the song "World of Make Believe" released by 3rd Faze and composed by Desmond Child, is replaced with his English cover of "World of Make Believe"

=== French release ===
No.	Title	Lyrics	Music	Length
1.	"Dis Lui" (Tell her)	Mike Brant	Morris Albert, Louis Gasté
2.	"Oso Zo" (As long as I live)	Vangelis Konstantinidis	Desmond Child
3.	"Mia Zoi Mazi" (A life together)	Vangelis Konstantinidis	Desmond Child
4.	"Aspro Mavro" (White-black)	Phoebus	Phoebus
5.	"Iparheis" (You exist)	Phoebus	Phoebus
6.	"Ola Kala" (Everything's fine)	Phoebus	Phoebus, Desmond Child
7.	"Tha Erthi I Stigmi (Taste the Tears)" (The moment will come)	Natalia Germanou	Diane Warren
8.	"An M' Akous" (If you can hear me)	Vangelis Konstantinidis	Desmond Child
9.	"Feelings"	Morris Albert	Morris Albert, Louis Gasté
10.	"The Light" (English version of "Mia Zoi Mazi")	Desmond Child, Eric Bazilian	Desmond Child, Eric Bazilian

† "Feelings" is a cover of the 1975 Morris Albert song
†† "Dis Lui" is a cover of the 1975 Mike Brant song, which is a French adaptation of "Feelings"
††† A 2003 Ola Kala international reissue was made available in some markets to include "Dis lui" and "Feelings" as bonus tracks

=== European re-release ===
No.	Title	Lyrics	Music	Length
1.	"Ola Kala (English Version)" (Everything's fine)	Phoebus, Desmond Child	Phoebus, Desmond Child
2.	"Oso Zo" (As long as I live)	Vangelis Konstantinidis	Desmond Child
3.	"The Light" (English version of "Mia Zoi Mazi")	Desmond Child, Eric Bazilian	Desmond Child, Eric Bazilian
4.	"Kati Omorfo" (Something beautiful)	Vangelis Konstantinidis	Desmond Child
5.	"Iparheis" (You exist)	Phoebus	Phoebus
6.	"Feelings"	Morris Albert	Morris Albert, Louis Gasté
7.	"Aspro Mavro" (White-black)	Phoebus	Phoebus
8.	"Disco Girl (English Version)"	Andreas Carlsson	Phoebus, Desmond Child
9.	"Pou Tha Pas (World of Make Believe)" (Where will you go)	Natalia Germanou	Desmond Child
10.	"Tha Erthi I Stigmi (Taste the Tears)" (The moment will come)	Natalia Germanou	Diane Warren
11.	"An M' Akous" (If you can hear me)	Vangelis Konstantinidis	Desmond Child
12.	"Ola Kala" (Everything's fine)	Phoebus	Phoebus, Desmond Child
13.	"Shake it"	Nektarios Tirakis	Nikos Terzis
14.	"Niose" (Feel)	Nektarios Tirakis	Nikos Terzis
15.	"Tha Me Thimithis" (You'll remember me)	Giannis Mihos	Stratos Diamantis
16.	"To Hrono Stamatao" (I stop time)	Giorgos Nikolaou	Stratos Diamantis
17.	"Disco Girl (Mykonos Remix)"	Desmond Child, Eric Bazilian	Desmond Child, Eric Bazilian

† Tracks 14–16 are taken off the next Greek album To Hrono Stamatao
†† Shake it is taken off the CD Single of same name

== Singles and music videos ==
The album produced three music videos all by French directors.

"Disco Girl"

"Disco Girl", released on December 17, 2001, was the first single from the album. It was released as a CD single with one remix and a promotional CD was also available with three additional remixes. The music video of the song was directed by Antonin Bonnet & Tanguy Dairaine and first appeared in Greece under the original release. The video was filmed in Cape Town, South Africa.

"Ola Kala"

The music video for "Ola Kala" was shot in Montreal, directed by Xavier Gens and produced by the Bullring Production company.

"Dis lui"

"Dis lui" was shot in Southern France, directed by Xavier Gens and produced by the Bullring Production company. It was released in France and the "Dis lui" video was used for the English language cover of the original song, "Feelings", which was released internationally. It was also used for the Greek version entitled "Pes Tis", penned by Aris Davarakis, which appeared later that year as a single from the album To Hrono Stamatao.

== Release history ==
Region	Date	Label	Format	Version
Greece	June 16, 2002	Minos EMI	CD	Original
Greece	September 2002	Minos EMI	CD	International
Cyprus	June 16, 2002	Minos EMI	CD	Original
Cyprus	September 2002	Minos EMI	CD	International
France	July 15, 2002	Universal Music, ULM	CD	International
Germany	June 16, 2004	EMI, Capitol Records	CD	European
France	August 19, 2003	Universal Music, ULM	CD	French
Hong Kong	March 8, 2004	Universal Music, ULM	CD	Asian
Egypt	2002	Mirage Records	CD	International

== Charts ==
The album certified gold in Greece eleven days after its release, and later was certified Platinum. The album has not received any certifications abroad.
