= Kati Apo Mena =

Kati Apo Mena Κάτι Από 'Μένα

Studio album by Sakis Rouvas
- Released: 3 December 1998
- Recorded: 1998
- Genre: Pop-rock, hard rock, pop, blues, soul, dance
- Length: 59:54
- Language: Greek
- Label: Minos EMI
- Producer: Vangelis Yannopoulos

Sakis Rouvas chronology
Tora Arhizoun Ta Dyskola (1996)	Kati Apo Mena; Κάτι Από 'Μένα (1998)	21os Akatallilos (2000)

Singles from Kati Apo Mena
- 1. "Theleis I Den Theleis"; 2. "I Kardia Mou"; 3. "Den Ehi Sidera I Kardia Sou"; 4. "Ipirhes Panda"

Kati Apo Mena (Greek: Κάτι Από ΄Μένα; English: Something From Me) is the sixth studio album by Greek singer Sakis Rouvas, released on 3 December 1998. The album is largely written by Giorgos Theofanous. This was Rouvas' first album with Minos EMI group and gained success, becoming gold two months after its release.

== Album information ==
=== Producers and collaborators ===
This was Rouvas' first album produced entirely by Vangelis Yannopoulos. It was also the first Rouvas' album released by Minos-Emi. Music was almost entirely written by composer Giorgos Theofanous. Folk-rock singer Stelios Rokkos also contributed four tracks to the album while Vangelis Konstantinidis also penned several tracks, as well as Natalia Germanou and Nikos Gritsis.

== Track listing ==
No.	Title	Lyrics	Music	Length
1.	"I Kardia Mou" (My Heart)	Giorgos Theofanous	Giorgos Theofanous	4:10
2.	"Sto Soma Sou" (On Top of Your Body)	Giorgos Theofanous	Giorgos Theofanous	4:19
3.	"Mono Ego S'agapo" (Only I Love You)	Stelios Rokkos	Stelios Rokkos	3:12
4.	"Ta Aspra Triandafylla" (White Roses)	Natalia Germanou	Giorgos Theofanous	3:58
5.	"O Tropos Pou Kitazi" (The Way She Stares)	Giorgos Theofanous	Giorgos Theofanous	3:48
6.	"Theleis I Den Theleis" (Do You Want To Or Not)	Vangelis Konstantinidis	Giorgos Theofanous	3:35
7.	"Den Ehi Sidera I Kardia Sou" (Your Heart Does Not Have Metal Rails)	Giorgos Theofanous	Giorgos Theofanous	4:06
8.	"Meta Apo Sena To Chaos" (After You The Chaos)	Giorgos Theofanous	Giorgos Theofanous	4:02
9.	"Ipirhes Panda" (You Were Always There)	Vangelis Konstantinidis	Giorgos Theofanous	3:51
10.	"Mono Ego" (Only Me)	Vangelis Konstantinidis	Giorgos Theofanous	4:02
11.	"Me Pio Dikeoma" (With What Right)	Giorgos Theofanous	Giorgos Theofanous	3:59
12.	"Arketa" (Enough)	Natalia Germanou	Giorgos Theofanous	3:41
13.	"Poso Thelo, Na 'Xeres" (How I Want You To Know)	Vangelis Konstantinidis	Giorgos Theofanous	4:35
14.	"Tha Mou Pari Kero" (It Will Take Me Some Time)	Stelios Rokkos	Stelios Rokkos	4:05
15.	"Den Ftais Esy" (It's Not Your Fault)	Stelios Rokkos / Nikos Gritsis	Stelios Rokkos	4:11
16.	"Den Tha 'Me Ego Eki" (I Won't Be There)	Stelios Rokkos	Stelios Rokkos	3:42

== Release history ==
Country	Date
Cyprus	3 December 1998
Greece	3 December 1998

== Singles ==
"Theleis I Den Theleis"
The only CD single from the album : it was released in late May 1998 along with three other songs that appeared on the album.

"I Kardia Mou"
The lead single from the album, released in December.

"Den Ehi Sidera I Kardia Sou"
The third single from the album was released in early 1999.

"Ipirhes Panda"
The final single from the album, released in Spring 1999.

== Music videos ==
Four of the songs from the album were made into videos:

- "Theleis I Den Theleis" (Director: Giorgos Lanthimos)
- "I Kardia Mou" (Director: Giorgos Lanthimos)
- "Den Ehi Sidera I Kardia Sou" (Director: Giorgos Lanthimos)
- "Ipirhes Panda" (Director: Giorgos Lanthimos)
