= This Is My Live =

Live album by Sakis Rouvas
- Released: 12 December 2007
- Recorded: 9 September – October 2007
- Genre: Live, rock, pop-rock, pop, dance
- Length: 1:12:55
- Label: Minos EMI

Sakis Rouvas chronology
Iparhi Agapi Edo (2006)	This Is My Live (2007)

Singles from This Is My Live
- 1. "Stous 31 Dromous" Released: December 2007

Professional ratings
Review scores
Source	Rating
MusicCorner	(favorable)

Sakis Rouvas performing for an audience of 7,000 at Lycabetus Theatre on 9 September 2007.

This Is My Live is the name of the second live album by Greek singer Sakis Rouvas, released on 12 December 2007 in Greece and Cyprus by Minos EMI. The album was recorded on 9 September 2007 at Rouvas' sold-out show at Lycabetus Theatre with an audience of 7,000. The concert was the final stop on the musician's Benefit Tour for the Greek fire victims of 2007. The combined effort of the tour and other appearances by Rouvas raised over €1,000,000 in fundraiser, becoming one of the greatest sources of aid and relief. The majority of the proceeds of this concert went to fire victims in Greece, particularly those of the 2007 Greek forest fires, however, another intention was to promote blood donation which was running short in Athens. As a result, thousands of pints of blood were collected.

The album ranked at number 34 on the IFPI Greece 2007 Annual Top 50 Greek Albums.

== Track listing ==
=== CD ===
1. "Stous 31 Dromous" (On 31st Street)
2. "Ola Gyro Sou Gyrizoun" (Everything Revolves Around You)
3. "Yiati Se Thelo" (Because I Want You)
4. "Mia Zoi Mazi" (One life together)
5. "Ipirhes Panda" (You Were Always There)
6. "S'eho Erotefthi" (I'm in Love With You)
7. "Den Ehi Sidera I Kardia Sou" (Your Heart Does Not Have Metal Rails)
8. "Andexa" (I Endured)
9. "Zise Ti Zoi" (Live Life)
10. "Se Thelo San Trelos" (I Want You Like Crazy)
11. "Suspicious Minds"
12. "To Hrono Stamatao" (I'm Stopping Time)
13. "Thelo Na Kitao" (I Want to Watch)
14. "Min Andistekese" (Don't Resist)
15. "Kane Me" (Make Me)
16. "Theleis I Den Theleis" (Do You Want It Or Not)
17. "Mikros Titanikos (Se Latrevo)" (Little Titanic (I Adore You))
18. "We Will Rock You"
19. "Satisfaction"
20. "Liomeno Pagoto" (Melted Ice Cream)
21. "Ela Mou" (Come to Me)
22. "Stous 31 Dromous (Rock Version)" (On 31st Street)

=== DVD ===
1. "Ola Gyro Sou Gyrizoun" (Everything Revolves Around You)
2. "Yiati Se Thelo" (Because I Want You)
3. "Mia Zoi Mazi" (One Life Together)
4. "Ipirhes Panda" (You Were Always There)
5. "S'eho Erotefthi" (I'm in Love With You)
6. "Den Ehi Sidera I Kardia Sou" (Your Heart Does Not Have Metal Rails)
7. "Andexa" (I Endured)
8. "Zise Ti Zoi" (Live Life)
9. "Se Thelo San Trelos" (I Want You Like Crazy)
10. "Suspicious Minds"
11. "To Hrono Stamatao" (I'm Stopping Time)
12. "Na M'agapas" (You Should Love Me)
13. "18 (Iparhi Agapi Edo)" (18 (There Is Love Here))
14. "Thelo Na Kitao" (I Want to Watch)
15. "Min Andistekese" (Don't Resist)
16. "Kane Me" (Make Me)
17. "Theleis I Den Theleis" (Do You Want It Or Not)
18. "Shake It"
19. "Mikros Titanikos (Se Latrevo)" (Little Titanic (I Adore You))
20. "We Will Rock You"
21. "Satisfaction"
22. "Liomeno Pagoto" (Melted Ice Cream)
23. "Ela Mou" (Come to Me)

Extras

1. "Stous 31 Dromous" (Video) (On 31st Street)
2. "Stous 31 Dromous" (Behind The Scenes Making Of) (On 31st Street)

== Singles ==
"Stous 31 Dromous"

"Stous 31 Dromous was the only single from the album and was released in December as a pop version for the video and radio airplay, while the rock version was released as a bonus track and is often more commonly performed by Rouvas. The song was the theme for the short-lived show of the same name on Mega Channel, also commonly known as 31st Street in its English subtitle version. The show is a Greek TV drama primarily filmed in New York City, while the music video shows Rouvas walking through the city as well as featuring character footage from the show. The song fared moderately well on radio airplay charts.

== Music videos ==
- "Ola Gyro Sou Gyrizoun"
- "Andexa"
- "Stous 31 Dromous"
- "Xana"
