= S'eho Erotefthi =

Album by Sakis Rouvas

S'eho Erotefthi Σ'έχω Ερωτευθεί

Studio album by Sakis Rouvas
- Released: 6 April 2005
- Recorded: 2004–2005
- Genre: Pop-rock, rock, pop, dance
- Length: 1:01:54
- Label: Minos EMI
- Producer: Lakis Papadopoulos

Sakis Rouvas chronology
To Hrono Stamatao (Re-release) (2004)	S'eho Erotefthi; Σ'έχω Ερωτευθεί (2005)	S'eho Erotefthi: Special Edition (2005)

Singles from S'eho Erotefthi
- 1. "S'eho Erotefthi" Released: March 2005; 2. "Na M'agapas" Released: June 2005; 3. "Hartini Zoi" Released: September 2005; 4. "1000 Milia" Released: October 2005; 5. "Mila Tis" Released: 5 December 2005

Professional ratings
Review scores
Source	Rating
MusicCorner	(favorable)

S'eho Erotefthi (Greek: Σ'έχω Ερωτευθεί; English: I'm In Love With You) is the tenth studio album by Greek singer Sakis Rouvas. The album was released on 6 April 2005 in Greece and debut at number 1 on the Greek albums chart, going Gold shortly after. The album eventually went Platinum. The album was also re-released as S'eho Erotefthi: Special Edition in November of the same year.

== Track listing ==
1. "S'eho Erotefthi" (I'm in Love With You)
2. "Na m'agapas" (You Should Love Me)
3. "Hartini Zoi" (Paper life)
4. "Spasmena Filia" (Shattered Kisses) (I'll Give You My Heart)
5. "Mila Tis" (Speak to Her)
6. "1000 Milia" (1000 Miles)
7. "Prospatho N'Allaxo" (I'm Trying to Change)
8. "Cairo"
9. "Yia Sena Ego Boro" (For You I Can)
10. "Ela Na Kanoume Mia Efhi" (Come On, Let's Make A Wish)
11. "Ego Horis Emena" (Me Without Myself)
12. "Mes' Tis Vitrines Se Kito" (I Watch You Through The Shop Windows)
13. "Oso Ise Edo" (As Long As You Are Here)
14. "Doro Sti Siopi" (Gift in Silence)
15. "Stamata Ti Vrohi" ([If I Could] Stop the Rain) (Stop the Rain)

== Singles ==
"Cairo"

Rouvas used the song as his opening act at his show at the Fever Club in the winter season of 2004–2005, months before the release of the album. The song was released as a radio promo only, and other than the live video of the performance at Fever, no video was made.

"S'eho Erotefthi"

The lead single from the album, it was released at the end of March 2005.

"Na M'agapas"

The second single from the album following the huge hit power-ballad "S'eho Erotefthi", "Na M'agapas".

"Hartini Zoi"

A hard rock ballad that was released in the early fall. The song was released as a radio single only.

"1000 Milia"

Released in October 2005, the dance song is one of Rouvas' only pieces to contain traditional Eastern influences.

"Mila Tis"

The final single from the album, "Mila Tis" was released to radios in the winter of that year.

== Music videos ==
Four of the singles were made into music videos. The hit "S'eho Erotefthi" became so successful that two different music videos were filmed.

- "S'eho Erotefthi" (1st Version)
- "S'eho Erotefthi" (2nd Version)
- "Na M'agapas"
- "1000 Milia"
- "Mila Tis"

== S'eho Erotefthi: Special Edition ==
S'eho Erotefthi: Special Edition Σ'έχω Ερωτευθεί: Special Edition

Studio album by Sakis Rouvas
- Released: 9 November 2005
- Recorded: 2004-2005
- Genre: Pop-rock, Pop, Dance
- Length: 1:01:47
- Label: Minos EMI
- Producer: Nektarios Kokkinos / Minos EMI

Sakis Rouvas chronology
S'eho Erotefthi (2004)	S'eho Erotefthi: Special Edition; Σ'έχω Ερωτευθεί: Special Edition (2005)	Live Ballads (2006)

Singles from S'eho Erotefthi
- 1. "Cairo"; 2. "S'eho Erotefthi"; 3. "Na M'agapas"; 4. "Hartini Zoi"; 5. "1000 Milia"; 6. "Mila Tis"

S'eho Erotefthi: Special Edition (Greek: Σ'ἐχω Ερωτευθεἴ: Special Edition) is the repackage of the tenth studio album by Sakis Rouvas, released on November 9, 2005 after the album gained double platinum status in only five months after its release. The album was repackaged in a 10"×12.5" limited edition gift box that included a double CD featuring the original album and a bonus DVD with three music videos of the first three singles from the album. The album also included a rare 32-page high-quality photo album titled Past...Present...Future...Sakis Photo Book: 1998-2005, featuring photographs from magazine shoots, the Eurovision Song Contest 2004, the 2004 Olympics in Athens, quotes, and a discography celebrating Rouvas' seven years with Minos EMI, available only with the album.

=== Track listing ===
CD

1. "S'eho Erotefthi"
2. "Na M'agapas"
3. "Hartini Zoi"
4. "Spasmena Filia"
5. "Mila Tis"
6. "1000 Milia"
7. Prospatho N'Allaxo"
8. "Cairo"
9. "Yia Sena Ego Boro"
10. "Ela Na Kanoume Mia Efhi"
11. "Ego Horis Emena"
12. "Mes' Tis Vitrines Se Kito"
13. "Oso Ise Edo"
14. "Doro Sti Siopi"
15. "Stamata Ti Vrohi"

DVD

1. "S'eho Erotefthi" (B Version)
2. "Na M'agapas"
3. "1000 Milia"

== Awards ==
=== Arion Music Awards ===
Year	Nominated work	Award	Result
2006	S'eho Erotefthi	Best Pop Song	nominated
2006	S'eho Erotefthi	Best Pop Album	Won
2006	S'eho Erotefthi	Best Male Pop Performance	Won
2006	"Mila Tis" (White Room)	Video of the Year	Nominated
2006	S'eho Erotefthi	Male Artist of the Year	Nominated

=== MAD Video Music Awards ===
Year	Nominated work	Award	Result
2006	"S'eho Erotefthi"	Best Pop Video	Nominated
2006	"Na M'agapas"	Video of the Year	Nominated
2006	"Na M'agapas"	Best Video by a Male Artist	Won
2006	"Na M'agapas"	Artist of the Year with Most-Played Video Transmissions	Nominated
2006	"Best Direction" (White Room)	Best Director	Nominated
2006	"Mila Tis"	Best-Dressed Artist in a Video	Won
