= To Hrono Stamatao =

Studio album by Sakis Rouvas
- Released: December 2003
- Recorded: 2003–2004
- Genre: Pop-rock, rock, pop, dance
- Label: Minos EMI

Sakis Rouvas chronology
Ola Kala (2002)	To Hrono Stamatao (2003)	S'eho Erotefthi (2005)

Singles from To Hrono Stamatao
- 1. "Pes Tis"; 2. "To Hrono Stamatao"; 3. "Hronia Polla"; 4. "Thelo Na Kitao"; 5. "Shake It"

Alternative covers
- Re-release cover

To Hrono Stamatao (Greek: Το Χρόνο Σταματάω, lit. 'I'm Stopping Time') is the tenth studio album by Greek pop-rock singer-songwriter Sakis Rouvas, released in December 2003 by Minos EMI in Greece and Cyprus. The album was re-released in May 2004 to contain Rouvas' hit "Shake It" along with a remix, which was Greece's entrant in the Eurovision Song Contest 2004 that won third place. Some of the songs from the album can also be found on the 2004 edition European release of the album Ola Kala which was used to further promote Rouvas' already stable international career after the Eurovision. The album was also released in other parts of the world such as Turkey and Russia.

== Track listing ==
Original release

1. "To Koritsi Ekino" (That girl)
2. "Ise Ta Panda" (You are everything)
3. "Se Kathe Anapnoi" (At every breath)
4. "Onira Trela" (Crazy dreams)
5. "Mazi Tha Zisoume" (We'll live together)
6. "Thelo Na Ziso Xana" (I want to live again)
7. "Thelo Na Kitao" (I want to watch)
8. "Hronia Polla" (Many Years)
9. "Milas, Kitas Paraxena" (You speak, You watch strangely)
10. "Lathos Zoi" (Wrong life)
11. "Niose" (Feel)
12. "Yia Mia Fora" (For once)
13. "Tha Ime Edo" (I'll be here)
14. "Tha Me Thymitheis" (You'll remember me)
15. "To Hrono Stamatao" (I stop time)
16. "Pes Tis" (Tell her)

Re-release (2004)

1. "Shake It"
2. "To Koritsi Ekino" (That girl)
3. "Ise Ta Panda" (You are everything)
4. "Se Kathe Anapnoi" (At every breath)
5. "Onira Trela" (Crazy dreams)
6. "Mazi Tha Zisoume" (We'll live together)
7. "Thelo Na Ziso Xana" (I want to live again)
8. "Thelo Na Kitao" (I want to watch)
9. "Hronia Polla" (Many Years)
10. "Milas, Kitas Paraxena" (You speak, You watch strangely)
11. "Lathos Zoi" (Wrong life)
12. "Niose" (Feel)
13. "Yia Mia Fora" (For once)
14. "Tha Ime Edo" (I'll be here)
15. "Tha Me Thymitheis" (You'll remember me)
16. "To Hrono Stamatao" (I stop time)
17. "Pes Tis" (Tell her)
18. "Shake It" (Marsheaux Radio Mix)

== Music videos ==
- "Pes Tis" (Director: Xavier Gens / Bullring)
- "To Hrono Stamatao" (Director: Kostas Kapetanidis)
- "Shake It" (Director: Kostas Kapetanidis)
- "Shake It" (International Version) (Director: Kostas Kapetanidis)
