= Min andistekesai =

Min andistekesai Μην αντιστέκεσαι

Studio album by Sakis Rouvas
- Released: September 1992
- Recorded: 1992
- Genres: Pop rock, blues, R&B, dance-pop, alternative hip hop
- Labels: PolyGram Greece, Fidelity
- Producer: Nikos Terzis

Sakis Rouvas chronology
Sakis Rouvas (1991)	Min andistekesai Μην αντιστέκεσαι (1992)	Yia Sena (1993)

Singles from Min Andistekesai
- 1. "Gyrna" Released: 1992; 2. "Min Andistekesai" Released: 1992; 3. "Gia Fantasou" Released: 1992; 4. "Na Ziseis Moro Mou" Released: 1992; 5. "Dose Mou Mia Nyhta" Released: 1992; 6. "Me Kommeni Tin Anasa" Released: 1992

Min andistekesai (Greek: Μην αντιστέκεσαι; English: Don't resist) is the second studio album by Greek pop musician Sakis Rouvas, released in September 1992 in Greece and Cyprus by PolyGram Records Greece. Like his self-titled debut album, this album was also entirely produced by composer Nikos Terzis, furthering the already rewarding collaboration.

== Track listing ==
1. "Na Ziseis Moro Mou" (Live My Baby) [Happy Birthday Baby]
2. "Gyrna" (Come Back)
3. "Dose Mou Mia Nyhta" (Give Me One Night)
4. "Ola Ine Mia Fygi" (Everything Is An Escape)
5. "Min Andistekesai" (Don't Resist)
6. "Gia Fantasou" (Come On, Imagine)
7. "Me Kommeni Tin Anasa" (Breathless)
8. "Pseftika" (Fake)
9. "Mia Parousia" (A Presence)
10. "To Proto Mou Lathos" (My First Mistake)
11. "Ela Sopa" (Come, Be Silent)
12. "Ego S'agapo" (I Love You)

Note: The tracks "Yia Fantasou" and "Ego S'agapo" were previously released on his debut album Sakis Rouvas .Music videos "

== Singles ==
- "Gyrna"
- "Min Andistekesai"
- "Gia Fantasou"
- "Me Kommeni Tin Anasa"
- "Na Ziseis Moro Mou"

== Music videos ==
- "Min Andistekesai" (Director: Etien Theotokis)
