= Gia Sena =

Gia sena Για σένα

Studio album by Sakis Rouvas
- Released: October 1993
- Recorded: 1993
- Genre: Pop-rock, rock, hard rock, pop, rock, dance-pop
- Language: Greek
- Label: PolyGram Greece, Polydor
- Producer: Alexis Papadimitriou

Sakis Rouvas chronology
Min Andistekese (1992)	Gia sena Για σένα (1993)	Aima, Dakrya & Idrotas (1994)

Singles from Gia Sena
- 1. "Kane me" 2. "To ksero eisai moni" 3. "Paraisthiseis"; 4. "Spasmeni klidaria" 5. "Ksehase to"

Gia sena (Greek: Για σένα; English: For you) is the third studio album by Greek musician Sakis Rouvas, released in October 1993 in Greece and Cyprus by PolyGram Records Greece.

== Track listing ==
All music is composed by Alexis Papadimitriou

No.	Title	Lyrics	Length
1.	"Gia sena" (For you)	Eleni Yiannatsoulia	1:06
2.	"Kane me" (Make me)	Eleni Yiannatsoulia	3:39
3.	"Koukla" (Doll)	Eleni Yiannatsoulia	3:28
4.	"Paraisthiseis" (Dillusions)	Eleni Yiannatsoulia	3:09
5.	"To ksero eisai moni" (I know you are alone)	Eleni Yiannatsoulia	4:07
6.	"Spasmeni klidaria" (Shattered lock)	Evi Droutsa	3:41
7.	"Agrios erotas" (Wild love)	Eleni Yiannatsoulia	3:33
8.	"Fige" (Leave)	Eleni Yiannatsoulia	3:48
9.	"Tha s'ekdikitho" (I will seek revenge upon you)	Natalia Germanou	2:57
10.	"Ksehase to" (Forget it)	Eleni Yiannatsoulia	3:40
11.	"Oso iparheis" (As long as you exist)	Alexis Papadimitriou	4:28
12.	"Gia oso tha me theleis" (For as long as you want me)	Eleni Yiannatsoulia	4:06

== Singles ==
"Kane me"

"Kane me" was the first single from the album. The video was directed by Rouvas' manager Elias Psinakis and his brother Giorgos in collaboration with View Studio. The video is shot half in color and half in black and white; it features Rouvas in militaristic clothing dancing onstage and getting ready to perform.

"To ksero eisai moni"

The second single from the album was "To ksero eisai moni", a romantic ballad. The music video was directed by the Psinakis brothers in collaboration with View Studio and features Rouvas in his home where he is upset when reminiscing about a former lover. He is seen playing with his dalmatian, playing the piano, and writing and destroying letters.

"Ksehase to"

The last single from the album was "Ksehase to". The music video was once again directed by the Psinakis brothers in collaboration with View Studio. It features Rouvas and a model within a photo frame in front of a colorful background. The two continuously appear in different conceptual outfits and have a difficult time getting along with each other.

== Release history ==
Country	Date
Cyprus	October 1993
Greece	October 1993

== Music videos ==
- "Kane me" ("Κάνε µε") (Directed by Giorgos and Ilias Psinakis)
- "To ksero eisai moni" ("Το ξέρω είσαι µόνη") (Directed by Giorgos and Ilias Psinakis)
- "Ksehase to" ("Ξέχασέ το") (Directed by Giorgos and Ilias Psinakis)
