= Sakis Rouvas (1991 album) =

Studio album by Sakis Rouvas
- Released: October 1991
- Recorded: 1991
- Genre: Pop rock; dance-pop
- Language: Greek
- Label: PolyGram Greece; Philips
- Producer: Nikos Terzis

Sakis Rouvas chronology
Sakis Rouvas (1991)	Min Andistekese (1992)

Singles from Sakis Rouvas
- 1. "Par'ta"; 2. "Mia Vrohi"; 3. "1992"

Sakis Rouvas (Greek: Σάκης Ρουβάς) is the self-titled debut album by Greek pop-rock musician Sakis Rouvas, released in October 1991 by PolyGram Records in Greece and Cyprus. The entire album was produced by composer Nikos Terzis who was on the rise in the early 1990s, while the songs have all been penned by Giorgos Pavrianos, who was an already established writer. The album officially declared Rouvas as Greece's first male pop singer to closely mirror other Western pop music acts, however, he is often widely perceived as the first Greek pop artist.

The album reached number one on the Greek Albums Chart. "Par'ta" ("Take it") became a number one radio hit, off of the album.

== Track listing ==
1. "Par'ta"
2. "1992"
3. "Giati Etsi M'Aresi"
4. "Mia Vrohi"
5. "Des! Pes!"
6. "Ta Trela Mas Onira"
7. "Giati Gamoto"
8. "Goustaro Fasi Rok end Roll"
9. "Super Mihanes, Petsina Boufan"
10. "Pou Pas"
11. "Ego S'agapo"
12. "Gia Fantasou"

== Singles ==
"Par'ta"

"Par'ta was Rouvas' debut single and lead single from the album. The song is a romantic ballad with blues and rock influences. It was selected as the representative song for Rouvas in the 30th Thessaloniki Song Festival by PolyGram Records, where Rouvas lost the award for "Best Vocal" by one point to another young artist, Giorgos Alkaios, but ultimately won the competition when the song was awarded the title for "Best Composition". It subsequently peaked at number one on the Greek Airplay Chart. The music video was directed by Nikos Soulis in collaboration with Antidoton and caused controversy due to its semi-nude scenes. It is shot partially in color and partially in black and white. The video opens with Rouvas looking through a photo album; when the music begins he is seen singing at a club and catches the attention of a female attendant who is there with her partner. Subsequent scenes show love scenes between Rouvas and the woman in a garden and bath, as well as Rouvas singing in a shower locker room.

"1992"

"1992" was the second single from the album and also went on to become popular on the airplay charts. Its video was once again directed by Nikos Soulis and Antidoton and was one of the first Greek music videos to experiment with graphics and incorporate group choreography. Rouvas is seen dressed in a suit, as a cowboy, American football player, and as Superman.

== Music videos ==
- "Par'ta" (Director: Nikos Soulis)
- "1992" (Director: Nikos Soulis)
