= Aima, Dakrya & Idrotas =

Aima, Dakrya & Idrotas Αίμα, Δάκρυα & Ιδρώτας

Studio album by Sakis Rouvas
- Released: November 1994
- Recorded: 1994
- Genre: Pop, rock, hard rock, dance-pop
- Language: Greek
- Label: PolyGram / Philips
- Producer: Nikos Karvelas

Sakis Rouvas chronology
Yia Sena (1993)	Aima, Dakrya & Idrotas; Αίμα, Δάκρυα & Ιδρώτας (1994)	Tora Arhizoun Ta Dyskola (1996)

Singles from Aima, Dakrya & Idrotas
- 1. "Aima, Dakrya & Idrotas"; 2. "Ela Mou"; 3. "Xana"; 4. "Symplegma Idipodio"; 5. "Grothia"; 6. "Efyges"; 7. "Den To Vlepeis"; 8. "Mia Fora"

Aima, Dakrya & Idrotas (Greek: Αίμα, Δάκρυα & Ιδρώτας; Blood, Tears & Sweat) is the fourth studio album by Greek singer Sakis Rouvas, released in November 1994 in Greece and Cyprus by PolyGram Records Greece. This was his primary collaboration with singer-songwriter and multi-instrumentalist Nikos Karvelas.

== Production history ==
The album was recorded throughout the second and third quarters of 1994. In 1995, when asked about the success of the album and a further collaboration with Rouvas and why he had chosen to work with him, Karvelas replied: "Sakis is the only star, out of a generation which produces dull artists."

== Track listing ==
No.	Title	Lyrics	Music	Length
1.	"Aima, Dakrya & Idrotas" (Blood, Tears & Sweat)	Nikos Karvelas	Nikos Karvelas	5:15
2.	"Symplegma Idipodio" (Oedipus Complex)	Nikos Karvelas	Nikos Karvelas	4:12
3.	"Xana" (Again)	Nikos Karvelas	Nikos Karvelas	4:30
4.	"Grothia" (Fist)	Nikos Karvelas	Nikos Karvelas	4:20
5.	"Efyges" (You Left)	Nikos Karvelas	Nikos Karvelas	4:10
6.	"Mia Fora" (One Time)	Marilena Panayiotopoulou	Nikos Karvelas	3:41
7.	"Ela Mou" (Come To Me)	Nikos Karvelas	Nikos Karvelas	4:30
8.	"Katastrofi" (Catastrophe)	Nikos Karvelas	Nikos Karvelas	4:16
9.	"Den To Vlepeis" (You Don't See It)	Marilena Panayiotopoulou	Nikos Karvelas	3:42
10.	"Patera" (Father)	Marilena Panayiotopoulou	Nikos Karvelas	3:30

== Release history ==
Country	Date
Cyprus	November 1994
Greece	November 1994

== Music videos ==
- "Aima, Dakrya & Idrotas" (Director: Manos Geranis, Writer: Ilias Psinakis)
- "Ela Mou" (Director: Kostas Kapetanidis, Writer: Ilias Psinakis)
- "Xana" (Director: Ilias Psinakis / View Studio)
- "Mia Fora" (Director: Kostas Kapetanidis, Writer: Ilias Psinakis)
