= Iparhi Agapi Edo =

Iparhi Agapi Edo Υπάρχει Αγάπη Εδώ

Studio album by Sakis Rouvas
- Released: 7 December 2006
- Genre: Pop, rock, electropop, dance
- Language: Greek
- Label: EMI/Minos

Sakis Rouvas chronology
Live Ballads (2006)	Iparhi Agapi Edo; Υπάρχει Αγάπη Εδώ (2006)	This Is My Live (2007)

Singles from Iparhi Agapi Edo
- 1. "18 (Iparhi Agapi Edo)" Released: December 2006; 2. "Ego Travao Zori" Released: December 2006; 3. "Ola Gyro Sou Gyrizoun" Released: February 2007; 4. "Mikros Titanikos (Se Latrevo)" Released: November 2007

Iparhi Agapi Edo (Greek: Υπάρχει Αγάπη Εδώ; English: There Is Love Here) is the eleventh studio album by Greek singer Sakis Rouvas. It was first released in Greece on 7 December 2006 by Minos EMI. Iparhi Agapi Edo includes 15 tracks including a ballad called "Mikros Titanikos" (Se Latrevo) that was written especially for Rouvas by Yiannis Parios. The album has also been released in Cyprus, Turkey, Bulgaria, Romania, Italy and in other EU countries. The album reached number one on the Greek albums chart, and was certified Platinum within its first month of release.

== Track listing ==
1. "O Iroas" (The hero)
2. "De Pirazi" (It doesn't matter)
3. "Ego Travao Zori" (I have difficulty)
4. "Psakse Me" (Search me)
5. "Poso Ponai Afto Pou Apofevgo" (How it hurts that which I avoid)
6. "M'ena Adio" (With one goodbye)
7. "Mikros Titanikos (Se Latrevo)" [Small Titanic (I adore you)]
8. "18 (Iparhi Agapi Edo)" [18 (Love exists here)]
9. "Mira Mou" (My fate)
10. "Ola Giro Sou Girizoun" (Everything revolves around you)
11. "Ela Edo" (Come here)
12. "Irthes" (You came)
13. "Fila Me Ki Allo" (Kiss me more)
14. "Yiati Se Thelo" (Because I want you)
15. "To Ergo" (The movie)

== Charts ==
The album reached number one on the Greek album Charts, and went platinum within a month of its release.
