= Shake It (Sakis Rouvas song) =

2004 song by Sakis Rouvas

Single by Sakis Rouvas

from the album To Hrono Stamatao (Re-release)
- Released: 20 April 2004
- Recorded: 2004
- Genre: Greek (syrto - syrtaki); pop; dance-pop
- Length: 3:00
- Label: Minos EMI
- Composer: Nikos Terzis
- Lyricist: Nektarios Tirakis
- Producer: Nikos Terzis

Sakis Rouvas singles chronology
"Feelings" (2003)	"Shake It" (2004)	"Se Thelo San Trelos" (2004)

Music video
- "Shake It" on YouTube

Audio sample
- file; help

Eurovision Song Contest 2004 entry
- Country: Greece
- Artist: Sakis Rouvas
- Language: English
- Composer: Nikos Terzis
- Lyricist: Nektarios Tirakis

Finals performance
- Semi-final result: 3rd
- Semi-final points: 238
- Final result: 3rd
- Final points: 252

Entry chronology
- ◄ "Never Let You Go" (2003)
- "My Number One" (2005) ►

Official performance video
- "Shake It" (Final) on YouTube

"Shake It" is a song recorded by Greek singer Sakis Rouvas and released in 2004. It was written by Nikos Terzis with lyrics by Nektarios Tirakis. The song represented Greece in the Eurovision Song Contest 2004, held in Istanbul, Turkey, where it placed third in the contest's final.

== Background ==
"Shake It" was composed by Nikos Terzis with lyrics by Nektarios Tirakis. It is an up-tempo song, fully in English language. The music also features some traditional Greek instrumentation as well as the heavy dance beats.

== Music video ==
The "Shake It" music video was directed by Kostas Kapetanidis, assisted by the production label Cream. The director had collaborated with Rouvas for the first time in 1995 for the video of the song "Ela Mou" and had produced many other videos for him since. The video itself was shot on location in the Greek island of Santorini, and features Rouvas singing in the water. The storyline was uncomplicated, featuring Rouvas and friends dancing and having a good time, with its objective being to put emphasis on the song's summer feeling through the dramatic natural beauty of the setting, representing a Greek identity. The video consists of eight scenes, while Rouvas can be seen changing outfits five times. The video for "Shake It" was one of the most-played videos of that year according to MAD TV and is one of Rouvas' most successful videos.

== Eurovision Song Contest ==
On 12 March 2004, the Hellenic Broadcasting Corporation (ERT) produced a national final to select its performer for the 49th edition of the Eurovision Song Contest –selection won by Apostolos Psichramis–, with the song to be selected on 17 March 2004. But on 13 March 2004, ERT instead announced that Sakis Rouvas had been internally selected as the Greek performer for Eurovision. On 20 March 2004, Rouvas performed "Shake It" for the first time during a special program on NET, as the song internally selected for the contest.

=== Performances ===
On 12 May 2004, the semi-final for the Eurovision Song Contest was held at the Abdi İpekçi Arena in Istanbul hosted by the Turkish Radio and Television Corporation (TRT), and broadcast live throughout the continent. As Greece had not finished in the top 10 at the previous contest, the song had to compete in the semi-final. Rouvas performed "Shake it" tenth on the night, accompanied by the three national final finalists –Psichramis, Antonis Dominos, and Gianna Fafaliou– as backing singers, following Monaco's "Notre Planète" by Maryon and preceding Ukraine's "Wild Dances" by Ruslana.

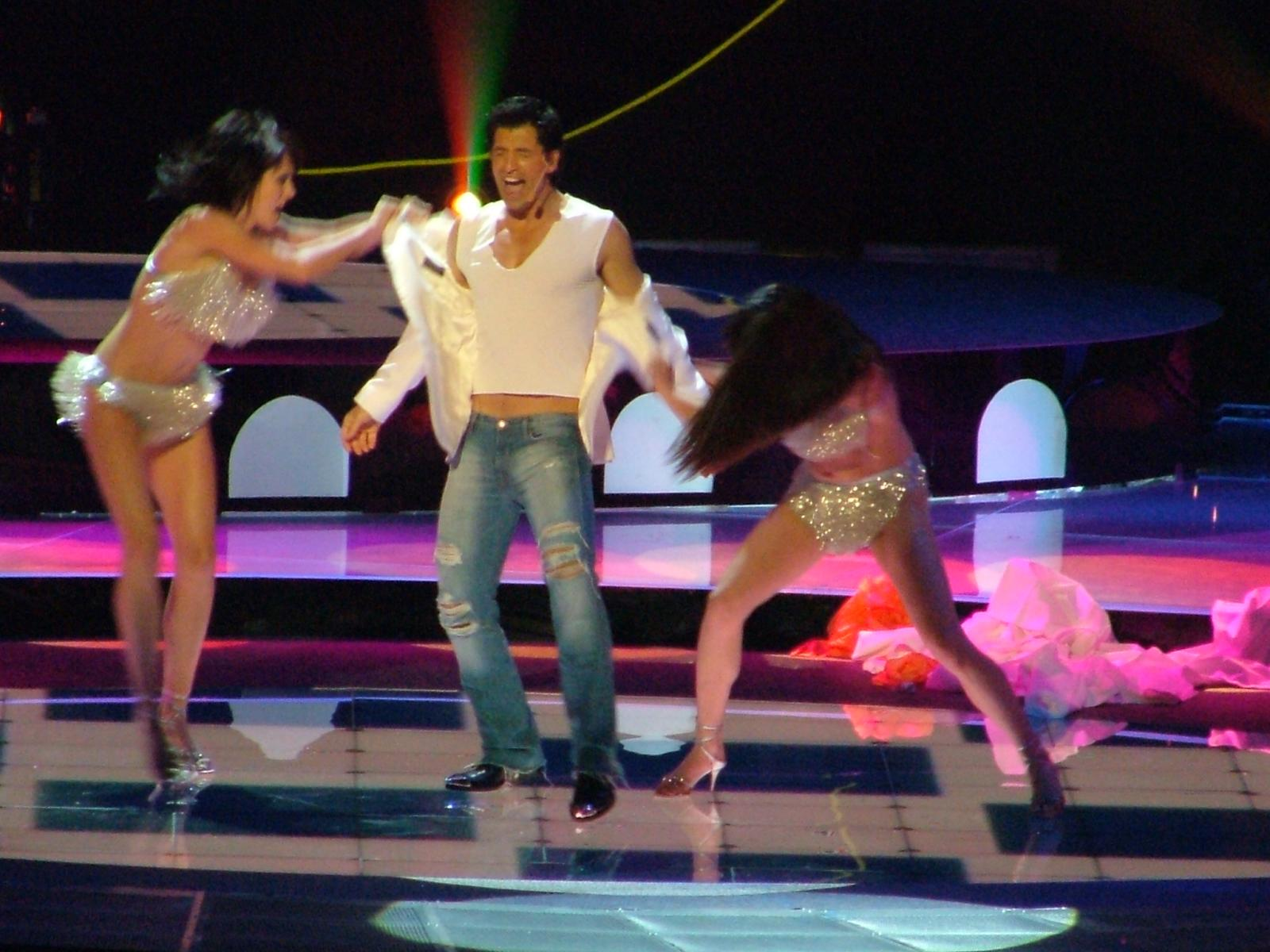
Rouvas performing the song in Istanbul

Fokas Evangelinos choreographed the Greek performance. It was sexualised, with Rouvas beginning by dancing with two girls wearing suits. As he sang the line "my world's on fire", he pulled red scarves from the trousers of his backing dancers. Later, he removed the suits from his dancers, revealing skimpy gold costumes. They later returned the favour by tearing his white jacket from him at the start of the final chorus, leaving him wearing a singlet and jeans. Live recordings of the performance feature loud cheers from the crowd as well as audible panting from Rouvas at the end of his athletic dance routine.

The song qualified for the final, with its placing revealed shortly after as third of the 22 entries, with 238 points. On 14 May 2004, the final for the Eurovision Song Contest was held and Rouvas performed "Shake it" 16th on the night, following Macedonia's "Life" by Toše Proeski and preceding Iceland's "Heaven" by Jónsi. At the close of voting, it had received 252 points, placing third in a field of 24.

=== Contest aftermath ===
In 2006, Greece hosted the contest, and Rouvas co-hosted it. He made a slight reference to "Shake it" when asked by co-host Maria Menounos how he had felt waiting for the results to be known when he participated. He told her that "I was shaking... brrrrrr... all over", prompting cheers from some of the audience. Rouvas would represent Greece again in the 2009 contest with the song "This Is Our Night", placing seventh.

== Track listing ==
1. "Shake It" (Eurovision Version)
2. "Shake It" (Club Remix by Nick Terzis)
3. "Shake It" (Soumka Mix)
4. "Shake It" (Marsheaux Radio Mix)
5. "Shake It" (Radio Version)

== Release history ==
Region	Date	Label	Format
Greece	March 2004	Minos EMI	Radio single
Greece	20 April 2004	Minos EMI	CD single
Cyprus	March 2004	Minos EMI	Radio single
Cyprus	20 April 2004	Minos EMI	CD single
Turkey	May 2004	Minos EMI	CD single
Europe	May 2004	Universal Music	CD single
Scandinavia	June 2004	Minos EMI	CD single

== Chart performance ==
"Shake It" was a successful song in both Greece and Cyprus, peaking at the top of both countries' charts for several weeks, while charting in a number of neighboring countries. It peaked at number one on both the Greek singles and airplay charts for nearly one year, making it one of the longest-charting songs in Greek music history. Being certified 4× platinum, it is considered to be one of the most successful CD singles in Greek history. The single also managed to gain success in further regions of Europe, such as Sweden, where it broke the Top 40 on the national singles chart, charting for one week at number 32.

=== Charts ===
Chart	Peak position	Certification
Belgium (Ultratop 50 Flanders)	14	—
Cyprus (All Records - airplay)	1	—
Greece (Nielson - airplay)	1	—
Greece (IFPI - singles)	1	4× Platinum
Sweden (Sverigetopplistan)	32	—

== Awards ==
=== Arion Music Awards ===
- Best Pop Song (Nominated)
- Video of the Year (Nominated)
- Male Artist of the Year (Nominated)
- Best-Selling Greek Single of the Year (Won)

=== MAD Video Music Awards 2004 ===
- Sexiest Appearance in a Video (Nominated)

=== Johnnie Walker's Men of the Year Awards ===
- Singer of the Year (Won)

=== World Music Awards 2005 ===
- World's Best-Selling Greek Artist (Won)

== Legacy ==
=== Impersonations ===
- In the eight episode of the second season of Your Face Sounds Familiar aired on 4 May 2014 on ANT1, Aris Plaskasovitis impersonated Rouvas singing "Shake It" replicating his performance at Eurovision.
