= Live Ballads =

Live album by Sakis Rouvas
- Released: 27 April 2006
- Recorded: 14 February – March 2006; Athens College, Greece
- Genre: Pop, R&B, soul, blues, acoustic
- Length: 69:06
- Label: EMI/Minos

Sakis Rouvas chronology
S'eho Erotefthi: Special Edition (2005)	Live Ballads (2006)	Live Ballads: Special Edition (2006)

Alternative covers
- Live Ballads: Special Edition

Singles from Live Ballads
- 1. "Horis Kardia" Released: April 2006; 2. "I'm in Love With You" Released: May 2006; 3. "Without You" Released: May 2006; 4. "Dodeka" Released: May 2006; 5. "Agapa Me" Released: June 2006; 6. "O,ti Onirevomoun" Released: June 2006; 7. "Ain't No Sunshine" Released: July 2006

Professional ratings
Review scores
Source	Rating
MusicCorner	favorable link

Live Ballads is the first live CD or video album, and eleventh album overall by Greek singer Sakis Rouvas, released in Greece and Cyprus on 27 April 2006 by Minos EMI. The concert was recorded on 14 February 2006 as a special Valentine's Day performance called Sakis For Valentines. Sakis sang only love oriented ballads in both Greek and English from his large repertoire and covers of other artists. The concert was much more intimate than his common large-scale performances and was held at the Athens College auditorium where Rouvas performed especially for the students as a "thank you" to his young fans, often being called "The Singer of Youth".

== Track listing ==
=== CD ===
No.	Title	Lyrics	Music	Length
1.	"Horis Kardia (The Blower's Daughter)" (Without A Heart)	Rebekka Roussi	Damien Rice
2.	"Ise Oli Mou I Zoi" (You're My Entire Life)	Vicky Gerothodorou	Soumka
3.	"S'eho Erotefthi" (I'm in Love With You)	Georgos Pavrianos	Stefanos Korkolis
4.	"Mia Zoi Mazi" (A Life Together)	Vangelis Konstantinidis	Desmond Child, Eric Bazilian
5.	"Ipirhes Panda" (You Were Always There)	Vangelis Konstantinidis	Georgos Theofanous
6.	"Na M'agapas" (You Should Love Me)	Lefteris Papadopoulos, Eleftheria Iakovaki	Lefteris Papadopoulos
7.	"Pes Tis (Feelings)" (Tell Her)	Ares Davarakis	Morris Albert, Louis Gaste
8.	"Den Ehi Sidera I Kardia Sou" (Your Heart Does Not Have Metal Rails)	Giorgos Theofanous	Giorgos Theofanous
9.	"Xana" (Again)	Nikos Karvelas	Nikos Karvelas
10.	"Kapote Tha 'Maste Mazi" (Sometime We'll Be Together)	Natalia Germanou	Nikos Karvelas
11.	"To Hrono Stamatao" (I'm Stopping Time)	Georgos Nikolaou	Stratos Diamantis
12.	"Se Thelo San Trelos" (I Want You Like Crazy)	Ares Davarakis	Stratos Diamantis
13.	"Without You / Dodeka" (Without You / Twelve)	Pete Ham / Filippos Nikolaou, Nikos Karvelas	Tom Evans / Nikos Karvelas
14.	"Agapa Me (Abrazame)" (Love Me)	Pyhtagoras	Julio Iglesias, Garcia R. Ferro
15.	"O,ti Onirevomoun" (Everything I Dreamt Of)	Phoebus	Phoebus
16.	"I'm in Love With You (S'eho Erotefthi)" (Horis Kardia)	Ares Davarakis	Stefanos Korkolis
17.	"Horis Kardia (The Blower's Daughter) Remix by Scumka" (Without A Heart)	Rebekka Roussi	Damien Rice

=== DVD ===
No.	Title	Lyrics	Music	Length
1.	"S'eho Erotefthi" (I'm in Love With You)	Georgos Pavrianos	Stefanos Korkolis
2.	"Mia Zoi Mazi" (A Life Together)	Vangelis Konstantinidis	Desmond Child, Eric Bazilian
3.	"Ipirhes Panda" (You Were Always There)	Vangelis Konstantinidis	Georgos Theofanous
4.	"Na M'agapas" (You Should Love Me)	Lefteris Papadopoulos, Eleftheria Iakovaki	Lefteris Papadopoulos
5.	"Mila Tis" (Speak To Her)	Evi Droutsa	Marios Psimopoulos
6.	"Den Ehi Sidera I Kardia Sou" (Your Heart Does Not Have Metal Rails)	Giorgos Theofanous	Giorgos Theofanous
7.	"Par'ta" (Take Them)	Georgos Pavrianos	Nikos Terzis
8.	"Xana" (Again)	Nikos Karvelas	Nikos Karvelas
9.	"Kapote Tha 'Maste Mazi" (Sometime We'll Be Together)	Natalia Germanou	Nikos Karvelas
10.	"To Hrono Stamatao" (I'm Stopping Time)	Georgos Nikolaou	Stratos Diamantis
11.	"O,ti Onirevomoun" (Everything I Dreamt Of)	Phoebus	Phoebus
12.	"Without You / Dodeka" (Without You / Twelve)	Pete Ham / Filippos Nikolaou, Nikos Karvelas	Tom Evans / Nikos Karvelas
13.	"Ain't No Sunshine"	Bill Withers	Bill Withers
14.	"Hey Jude"	Paul McCartney	John Lennon
15.	"Help Me Make It Through the Night"	Kris Kristofferson	Kris Kristofferson

Extras
No.	Title	Lyrics	Music	Length
16.	"Horis Kardia (The Blower's Daughter) (music video)" (Without A Heart)	Rebekka Roussi	Damien Rice

== Live Ballads: Special Edition ==
The special edition comes repackaged in a 10"×12.5" gift box, featuring a bonus DVD of the performance and a high-quality photo book showcasing images from the concert.

== Release history ==
Country	Date
Cyprus	27 April 2006
Greece	27 April 2006

== Music videos ==
Sakis Rouvas performing on 14 February 2006 at Athens College.

- "Horis Kardia"
- "Without You" / "Dodeka"
- "Agapa Me" / "Na M'agapas" (MAD VMAs 2006)
- "O,ti Onirevomoun"
- "Ain't No Sunshine"
