= Tora Arhizoun Ta Dyskola =

Tora Arhizoun Ta Dyskola Τώρα Αρχίζουν Τα Δύσκολα

Studio album by Sakis Rouvas
- Released: 12 May 1996
- Recorded: 1995–1996
- Genre: Pop, rock, dance-pop
- Language: Greek
- Label: PolyGram Greece, Mercury
- Producer: Nikos Karvelas

Sakis Rouvas chronology
| Aima, Dakrya & Idrotas (1994) | Tora Arhizoun Ta Dyskola; Τώρα Αρχίζουν Τα Δύσκολα (1996) | Kati Apo Mena (1998) |

Alternative covers
- Special Edition cover

Singles from Tora Arhizoun Ta Dyskola
- 1. "Tora Arhizoun Ta Dyskola"; 2. "Afiste Tin"; 3. "Ase Me Na Fygo"; 4. "Mi M'agapiseis"; 5. "Pou ke Pote"; 6. "Ime Hamenos"; 7. "Kapote Tha 'Maste Mazi"

Tora Arhizoun Ta Dyskola (Greek: Τώρα Αρχίζουν Τα Δύσκολα; English: Now The Difficult Times Begin) is the fifth studio album by Greek singer Sakis Rouvas, released on 12 May 1996 in Greece and Cyprus by PolyGram Records Greece. This was Rouvas' second album to be entirely produced by singer-songwriter, composer and multi-instrumentalist Nikos Karvelas, after the groundbreaking success of Aima, Dakrya & Idrotas in 1994.

== Track listing ==
| No. | Title | Lyrics | Music | Length |
|---|---|---|---|---|
| 1. | "Tora Arhizoun Ta Dyskola" (Now The Difficult Times Begin) | Natalia Germanou | Nikos Karvelas | 2:58 |
| 2. | "Ase Me Na Fygo" (Let Me Leave) | Nikos Karvelas | Nikos Karvelas | 3:12 |
| 3. | "Mi M'agapiseis" (Don't Love Me) | Natalia Germanou | Nikos Karvelas | 3:53 |
| 4. | "Afiste Tin" (Leave Her) | Apostolos Diavolikis | Nikos Karvelas | 3:33 |
| 5. | "Pos Ta Kataferes" (How Did You Manage?) | Nikos Karvelas | Nikos Karvelas |
| 6. | "Kapote Tha 'Maste Mazi" (Sometime We'll Be Together) | Natalia Germanou | Nikos Karvelas | 4:11 |
| 7. | "Pou ke Pote" (Where and When) | Nikos Karvelas | Nikos Karvelas | 3:17 |
| 8. | "Diaforetikos" (Different) | Nikos Karvelas | Nikos Karvelas |
| 9. | "Ime Hamenos" (I Am Lost) | Natalia Germanou | Nikos Karvelas | 3:51 |
| 10. | "Dos Mou" (Give Me) | Nikos Karvelas | Nikos Karvelas |
| 11. | "De Tha Se Xehaso" (I Won't Forget You) | Nikos Karvelas | Nikos Karvelas | 4:11 |

== Special Edition ==
It was re-released by PolyGram Greece to contain four bonus tracks of remixes of the previous hit singles from the album.

=== Track listing ===
| No. | Title | Lyrics | Music | Length |
|---|---|---|---|---|
| 1. | "Tora Arhizoun Ta Dyskola" (Now The Difficult Times Begin) | Natalia Germanou | Nikos Karvelas | 2:58 |
| 2. | "Ase Me Na Fygo" (Let Me Leave) | Nikos Karvelas | Nikos Karvelas | 3:12 |
| 3. | "Mi M'agapiseis" (Don't Love Me) | Natalia Germanou | Nikos Karvelas | 3:53 |
| 4. | "Afiste Tin" (Leave Her) | Apostolos Diavolikis | Nikos Karvelas | 3:33 |
| 5. | "Pos Ta Kataferes" (How Did You Manage?) | Nikos Karvelas | Nikos Karvelas |
| 6. | "Kapote Tha 'Maste Mazi" (Sometime We'll Be Together) | Natalia Germanou | Nikos Karvelas | 4:11 |
| 7. | "Pou ke Pote" (Where and When) | Nikos Karvelas | Nikos Karvelas | 3:17 |
| 8. | "Diaforetikos" (Different) | Nikos Karvelas | Nikos Karvelas |
| 9. | "Ime Hamenos" (I Am Lost) | Natalia Germanou | Nikos Karvelas | 3:51 |
| 10. | "Dos Mou" (Give Me) | Nikos Karvelas | Nikos Karvelas |
| 11. | "De Tha Se Xehaso" (I Won't Forget You) | Nikos Karvelas | Nikos Karvelas | 4:11 |

Bonus Tracks
| No. | Title | Lyrics | Music | Length |
|---|---|---|---|---|
| 13. | "Tora Arhizoun Ta Dyskola (Latin Dance Mix)" (Now The Difficult Times Begin) | Natalia Germanou | Nikos Karvelas |
| 14. | "Tora Arhizoun Ta Dyskola (Club Mix)" (Now The Difficult Times Begin) | Natalia Germanou | Nikos Karvelas |
| 15. | "Afiste Tin (Dance Mix)" (Leave Her) | Apostolos Diavolikis | Nikos Karvelas |
| 16. | "Afiste Tin (Extended Mix 12")" | Apostolos Diavolikis | Nikos Karvelas |

== Music videos ==
- "Tora Arhizoun Ta Dyskola" (Director: Vaggelis Kalaitzidis; Writer: Elias Psinakis)
- "Afiste Tin" (Director: Nikos Antonopoulos; Writer: Elias Psinakis)
- "Pou ke Pote" (Director: Nikos Antonopoulos; Writer: Elias Psinakis)
