= 21os Akatallilos =

21os Akatallilos 21ος Ακατάλληλος

Studio album by Sakis Rouvas
- Released: 9 April 2000
- Recorded: 1999–2000
- Genre: Rock, hard rock, pop-rock, pop, blues, funk, soul, dance
- Length: 45:38
- Language: Greek
- Label: Minos EMI
- Producer: Vangelis Yannopoulos

Sakis Rouvas chronology
Kati Apo Mena (1998)	21os Akatallilos; 21ος Ακατάλληλος (2000)	Sakis Rouvas (2001)

Singles from 21os Akatallilos
- 1. "Anteksa"; 2. "Se Thelo San Trelos"; 3. "Askisi Ipotagis"; 4. "Delfinaki"; 5. "Kanoume Onira"; 6. "Anteksa (Club Mix)"

21os Akatallilos (Greek: 21ος Ακατάλληλος) (English: 21 X-Rated) is the eighth studio album by Greek singer Sakis Rouvas and his second produced by Vangelis Yannopoulos, for Minos Emi. The album was released on 9 April 2000 in Greece and Cyprus, and debut at number one on the charts. As opposite to his former release Kati apo mena, there is no composition or any contribution by George Theofanous. Main composer was Stratos Diamandis and these songs were his first ever released. A tough bet taken by Sakis' producer, Vangelis Yannopoulos. Other remarkable contributions were the ones of two cult Greek bands Maskes and Ammos, plus the lyrics written by Greek actor star, Lakis Lazopoulos, and Greek lyricist Aris Davarakis. This album was Rouvas' fastest selling album ever since the beginning of his career. The dramatic instrumental introduction part of "Anteksa" featured, for many years, as the musical motto of all his live appearances. On track 6 "Stin mama sou", backing vocals are provided by his then manager Elias Psinakis and his then producer Vangelis Yannopoulos, by composer Stratos Diamandis and by other fellows who happened to be present at that moment in the studio premises... and were invited within the vocal booth.

21os Akatallilos was re-released with two bonus songs in February 2001. The album contains a bonus "Club Mix" of singles "Anteksa" and an "Added Mix" of the power-ballad "Se Thelo San Trelos".

== Track listing ==
=== Original release ===
1. "Anteksa" (I Endured)
2. "Se Thelo San Trelos" (I Want You Like Crazy)
3. "Askisi Ipotagis" (Exercise of Obedience)
4. "Kanoume Onira" (We're Making Dreams)
5. "In' O,ti Kratisa" (It's What I've kept)
6. "Sti Mama Sou" (With Your Mama)
7. "Voudas" (Buddha)
8. "I Orea Kimomeni (Paramythi)" (Sleeping Beauty (Fairytale))
9. "Kitaxe Me Sto Fos" (Look At Me in the Light)
10. "Rezerva" (Reserve)
11. "I Fili ki Gnosti" (Friends and Acquaintances)
12. "Delfinaki" (Little Dolphin)
13. "Akatallilos" (Inapt)

=== Re-release ===
1. "Anteksa" (I Endured)
2. "Se Thelo San Trelos" (I Want You Like Crazy)
3. "Askisi Ipotagis" (Exercise of Obedience)
4. "Kanoume Onira" (We're Making Dreams)
5. "In' O,ti Kratisa" (It's What I've kept)
6. "Sti Mama Sou" (With Your Mama)
7. "Voudas" (Buddha)
8. "I Orea Kimomeni (Paramythi)" (Sleeping Beauty (Fairytale))
9. "Kitaxe Me Sto Fos" (Look At Me in the Light)
10. "Rezerva" (Reserve)
11. "I Fili ki Gnosti" (Friends and Acquaintances)
12. "Delfinaki" (Little Dolphin)
13. "Akatallilos" (Inapt)

Bonus Tracks

1. "Anteksa" (Club Mix) (I Endured)
2. "Se Thelo San Trelos" (Added Mix) (I Want You Like Crazy)

== Music videos ==
- "Anteksa"
- "Se Thelo San Trelos"
- "Askisi Ipotagis"
- "Delfinaki"
- "Kanoume Onira"
- "Anteksa" (Club Mix)
