= Labilna =

2016 studio album

- Physical edition cover art

Studio album by Ana Nikolić
- Released: 12 May 2016
- Recorded: 2013–2016 (Belgrade and New York City)
- Genre: Electropop; R&B; dancehall
- Label: Balkaton; City Records
- Producer: Rasta; Coby; Damir Handanović

Ana Nikolić chronology
Milion dolara (2013)	Labilna (2016)	Klinika (2020)

Alternative cover
- Digital edition cover art

Labilna is the fifth studio album by Serbian singer Ana Nikolić, released by record labels Balkaton and City Records on 12 May 2016. The record contains eight songs in R&B, dancehall and trap genres. It had printing of 100,000 copies, making it one of the best-selling Serbian albums of the year.

== Background ==
Ana started to work on the new album following the release of her fourth record Milion dolara in 2013. Claiming that she wasn't satisfied with the new songs she had recorded, Ana started from scratch in 2016 while bringing hit-makers Stefan Đurić Rasta, later to be her husband, and Slobodan Veljković Coby to her team. "200/100" and "Telo" (Body) were the only two songs that were kept from the initial track listing. "Da te vratim" (To Bring You Back) is the only ballad on the album and is dedicated to Ana's late father, while the title song has homosexual references. In late April, Ana announced the title of her fifth studio album and the release date.

== Track listing ==
No.	Title	Writer(s)	Length
1.	"Frigidna" (featuring Rasta)	Stefan Đurić; Marina Tucaković; Slobodan Veljković	3:06
2.	"Mala"	Đurić; Veljković	3:12
3.	"Telo"	Damir Handanović; Tucaković; Veljković	3:26
4.	"Da Te Vratim"	Đurić; Tucaković; Veljković	2:38
5.	"Labilna"	Đurić; Veljković	3:15
6.	"200/100"	Handanović; Tucaković; Veljković	3:40
7.	"Konkretno" (featuring Rasta)	Đurić; Antonije Stojiljković; Veljković	3:02
8.	"Frikovi"	Đurić; Tucaković; Veljković	3:13
Total length:			25:32

== Release history ==
Country	Date	Format	Label
Serbia	May 12, 2016	CD, digital download	City Records
