= Ana Nikolić =

Serbian singer (born 1978)

Ana Nikolić Ана Николић
- Also known as: Ana Nikolić Nika; Ana Đurić
- Born: 27 September 1978 (age 47); Jagodina, SR Serbia, SFR Yugoslavia
- Origin: Paraćin, Serbia
- Genres: Pop; pop-folk; electropop
- Occupation: Singer
- Instrument: Vocals
- Years active: 2003–present
- Labels: City Records; Balkaton
- Spouse: Stefan Đurić Rasta (m. 2016; div. 2018)

Ana Nikolić (Serbian Cyrillic: Ана Николић; pronounced [âna nǐkolit͡ɕ]; born 27 September 1978) is a Serbian singer and television personality. Born in Jagodina and raised in Paraćin, she rose to prominence by competing in the Beovizija 2003 music festival with the song "Januar". Nikolić has to date released five studio albums.

== Early life ==
Ana Nikolić was born on September 27, 1978, in Jagodina, but grew up in Paraćin. She has a brother, Marko Nikolić, who worked as her manager. After graduating from grammar school, Nikolić moved to Belgrade where she attended secondary polytechnic school, studying design.

In 1998, Ana lost her father, whom she dedicated her 2016 song "Da te vratim" to. According to her, the loss of her father also stimulated her to become more independent and to start performing professionally. During the 1999 bombing Nikolić moved to Greece, where she lived for nine months. There, Ana was further influence to pursue a career in music by singer Sakis Rouvas.

== Career ==
In 1998, Nikolić made her first television appearance on the show 3K Dur, where she sang "Kolačići" by Marina Perazić. In April 2003, she rose to prominence by competing on the national selection for the Eurovision Song Contest, called Beovizija, with her entry "Januar". Despite placing 7th, Nikolić received the award for the best debut performance. Subsequently, in August, she released her debut studio album through City Records under her then stage name Nika. The album also marked the beginning of her collaboration with songwriters Marina Tucaković and Aleksandar Milić Mili. In 2006, Nikolić returned to Beovizija with "Romale romali", finishing as the runner-up. The song received significant success and has become Nikolic's signature hit. The same year in December, she also released her sophomore album, Devojka od čokolade, after which she embarked on her first regional tour. Nikolić competed on Beovizija once again in March 2009, where she reached the final only after the statement that the votes had been miscounted. Nikolić subsequently decided to not take part in the final and later sued Radio Television of Serbia. In October 2014, she claimed victory over Serbian public broadcaster, receiving €20,000 in damages. In September 2009, she entered Serbian reality television show Farma, but was disqualified after three days for rule breaking. Her third body of work, Mafia Caffe, was released in July 2010.

In July 2013, she released Milion dolara with several stand out hits, such as the title track featuring Nikolija and "Đavo". Nikolić's fifth album, Labilna, was released in May 2016. Produced by hip hop artists Rasta and Coby, it saw significant departure from her previous work to a more urban sound. Same year, she went on to appear as a judge on the fifth season of Ja imam talenat!, the Serbian spin-off of the Got Talent franchise, alongside Rasta who was her husband at the time. The couple also collaborated on "Slučajnost", which was released in June 2017 and was later included to Rasta's album Indigo. After giving birth to her daughter in August 2017, Nikolić decided to take a break from music to focus on motherhood and her body image issue regarding a highly publicized weight gain.

In February 2020, Nikolić returned to public life by releasing "Bilo je lepo" followed by music videos for six other songs, which were all supposed to be a part of the album titled Klinika. The album was, however, eventually scrapped due to COVID-19 pandemic. By the end of 2022, Nikolić announced her first solo concert in the Belgrade Arena for 7 October 2023 to celebrate twenty years of career. In August 2023, Hype Production, which was responsible for the concert's organization, announced that the tickets had been withdrawn from sale due to lack of "technical conditions". Although they highlighted that the concert had not been cancelled, Nikolić's live show in the Arena was eventually never realized.

== Controversy ==
In November 2010, Nikolić was detained in a police station in Rakovica for driving under influence.

Following the Fukushima nuclear disaster in 2011, Nikolić claimed she was foster caring a Japanese baby boy. She subsequently faced scrutiny after Serbian daily newspaper Kurir had reported that the baby was in fact Chinese from a family residing in New Belgrade. Nikolić firmly denied the allegations, stating that the baby's parents decided to come "as soon as possible" to take him back to Japan after the media scandal had erupted.

In December 2014, she described the then Prime Minister of Serbia, Aleksandar Vučić, as "irresistible". In May 2023, she invited followers on Instagram to join the government-organized counter-demonstration organised by Vučić's Serbian Progressive Party against the 2023 Serbian protests.

During an episode of Ja imam talenat! in 2017, Nikolić made a comment about an auditionee whose talent was singing, which was interpreted by several media outlets as homophobic. She told the auditionee, a man who said he "feels like a woman", that he has "such a big desire to be a songstress that it's incredible". In August 2022, Nikolić stated she agreed with the Serbian Orthodox Church on the matter of EuroPride, held that year in Belgrade, and condemned it. Several days later, Nikolić wrote on Instagram that she had "never turned her back to the LGBT community".

In June 2022, she was caught up in another media scandal when she released her demo of the song "Provereno", which had already been released by Milica Pavlović as a part of her album Posesivna. Pavlović disclosed her intentions to file a lawsuit against Nikolić several days after. No legal actions were eventually taken regarding the incident.

== Personal life ==
On 28 July 2016, Nikolić married music artist Stefan Đurić Rasta. Their daughter, Tara, was born on 3 August 2017. The couple filled for a divorce in November the following year.

== Discography ==
=== Studio albums ===
- Januar (2003)
- Devojka od čokolade (2006)
- Mafia caffé (2010)
- Milion dolara (2013)
- Labilna (2016)

=== Extended plays ===
- Hvala, doviđenja (2024)

=== Singles ===
Title	Year	Peak chart positions	Album
Title	Year	CRO Billb.	Album
"Januar"	2003	*	Januar
"Romale romali"	2006	*	Devojka od čokolade
"Šizofrenija" (with Aca Lukas)	2008	*	Platinum Collection
"Ekstaza"	2009	*	Platinum Collection
"Bili smo najlepši"	2009	*	Beovizija 2009
"Džukelo"	2010	*	Mafia caffé
"Baksuze"	2012	*	Milion dolara
"Milion dolara" (featuring Nikolija)	2013	*	Milion dolara
"Voli me, voli me"	2015	*	Non-album single
"200/100"	2016	*	Labilna
"Slučajnost" (with Rasta)	2017	*	Indigo
"Bilo je lepo"	2020	*	Non-album singles
"Klinika"	2020	*	Non-album singles
"Ženo"	2020	*	Non-album singles
"Hijene"	2020	*	Non-album singles
"Perspektive"	2020	*	Non-album singles
"Ti si kriv"	2020	*	Non-album singles
"Nije mi do seksa"	2020	*	Non-album singles
"Prolazi"	2021	*	Non-album singles
"Nevina i kriva"	2023	—	Non-album singles
"Teresa s pogledom na zid"	2024	21	Hvala, doviđenja
"Ja samo ličim na nju"	2025	22	Non-album singles
"Nije mi 22"	2025	—	Non-album singles

== Filmography ==
Television work of Ana Nikolić
Year	Title	Role	Notes
2008-2010	Pare ili život	as Sanela	5 episodes
2009	Farma	Herself (contestant)	Season 1; quit on Day 4
2012	Prvi kuvar Srbije	Herself (contestant)	
2015	Više od igre	Herself (judge)	
2016-2017	Ja imam talenat!	Herself (judge)	Season 5
