= Sakis Rouvas (2001 album) =

Box set by Sakis Rouvas
- Released: 2001
- Recorded: 1991–1996
- Genre: Pop rock, hard rock, dance-pop, R&B, alternative hip hop, teen pop
- Language: Greek
- Label: Delta Club, Universal Music Greece, Mercury
- Producer: Nikos Terzis, Alexis Papadimitriou, Nikos Karvelas

Sakis Rouvas chronology
| 21os Akatallilos (Re-release) (2000) | Sakis Rouvas (2001) | Ola Kala |

Sakis Rouvas is the first box set album, second compilation album and ninth album overall by Greek pop-rock singer-songwriter Sakis Rouvas. The box set comprises 4 CDs containing a near-complete collection of Rouvas' first works under the PolyGram Records record company. The collection is released by Greek music compilation issue label Delta Club and is entirely licensed by Universal Music Greece.

== Track listing ==
CD 1

1. "Pou Pas" – 4:08
2. "Ego S'agapo" – 4:04
3. "Gyrna" – 3:34
4. "Ta Trela Mas Onira" – 3:40
5. "Na Ziseis Moro Mou" – 3:24
6. "De Tha Se Xehaso" – 4:11
7. "To Xero Ise Moni" – 4:07
8. "Efyges" – 4:10
9. "Min Andistekese" – 4:12
10. "Ela Mou" – 4:30
11. "Ola Ine Mia Fygi" – 3:35
12. "Ela Sopa" – 3:26
13. "Oso Iparheis" – 4:28

CD 2

1. "Ase Me Na Fygo" – 3:12
2. "Mi M'agapiseis" – 3:53
3. "Afiste Tine" – 3:33
4. "Kapote Tha 'Maste Mazi" – 4:11
5. "Dose Mou Mia Nyhta" – 3:11
6. "Tora Arhizoun Ta Dyskola" – 2:58
7. "Xehase To" – 3:40
8. "Yia Sena" – 1:06
9. "Ime Hamenos" – 3:51
10. "Pseftika" – 3:37
11. "To Proto Mou Lathos" – 3:07
12. "Mia Parousia" – 3:51

CD 3

1. "Aima, Dakrya & Idrotas" – 5:15
2. "Xana" – 4:30
3. "Tha S'ekdikitho" – 2:57
4. "Yia Oso Tha Me Theleis" – 4:06
5. "Me Kommeni Tin Anasa" – 3:40
6. "Fyge" – 3:48
7. "Pou ke Pote" – 3:17
8. "Kane Me" – 3:39
9. "Yia Fantasou" – 3:27
10. "Yiati Gamoto" – 3:34
11. "Katastrofi" – 4:16
12. "1992" – 3:14
13. "Mia Fora" – 3:41

CD 4

1. "Goustaro Fasi Rok end Roll" – 3:26
2. "Super Mihanes, Petsina Boufan" – 3:18
3. "Symplegma Idipodio" – 4:12
4. "Spasmeni Klidaria" – 3:41
5. "Agrios Erotas" – 3:33
6. "Koukla" – 3:28
7. "Paraisthiseis" – 3:09
8. "Grothia" – 4:20
9. "Par'ta" – 4:14
10. "Mia Vrohi" – 4:10
11. "Des! Pes!" – 3:42
12. "Yiati Etsi M'aresi" – 3:36
13. "Den To Vlepeis" – 3:45
