= Januar =

Studio album by Ana Nikolić
- Released: 23 August 2003
- Genre: Pop
- Label: City Records
- Producer: Aleksandar Milić Mili

Ana Nikolić chronology
Januar (2003)	Devojka od čokolade (2006)

Singles from Januar
- 1. "Januar"; 2. "Vatra"; 3. "Hoću da te gledam"

Januar is the debut studio album by Serbian recording artist Ana Nikolić. It was released on 23 August 2003 by City Records. Nikolić worked with several producers on the album, mainly Aleksandar Milić Mili who is known for his work with Serbian folk singer Ceca Ražnatović. All of the songs were written by Marina Tucaković, and they mainly talk about passion and cheating. Musically, the album drew inspiration from European pop sound incorporating music genres of the Balkans region.

For songs "Vatra" and "Hoću da te gledam" Ana filmed extremely effective and high quality videos.

== Track listing ==
Original edition
No.	Title	Writer(s)	Length
1.	"Januar"	A. Milić	4:04
2.	"Atina"		3:08
3.	"Ptica skitnica"		2:48
4.	"Uvek ima jedan još"		2:54
5.	"Ako ikad ostarim"		4:03
6.	"Hoću da te gledam..."		3:57
7.	"Vatra" (featuring Haris Džinović)		3:14
8.	"Moj klub"		3:27
9.	"Srećan mi ne dolazi"		3:43
