= Rasta (singer) =

Serbian rapper and singer (born 1989)

Rasta Раста
- Born: Stefan Đurić; 16 November 1989 (age 36); Priština, SR Serbia, SFR Yugoslavia
- Genres: Hip hop; reggaeton; trap; R&B; turbofolk
- Occupations: Rapper; singer; songwriter; producer; businessman
- Instrument: Vocals
- Years active: 2006–present
- Labels: Bassivity; IDJTunes; Balkaton Gang
- Spouse: Ana Nikolić (m. 2016; div. 2018)

Stefan Đurić (Serbian Cyrillic: Стефан Ђурић; born 16 November 1989), better known as Rasta (Serbian Cyrillic: Раста), is a Serbian rapper, singer, songwriter and producer from Priština. Recognized as one of the most popular Serbian artists of his generation, Rasta is known for popularizing the Auto-Tune pitch correction effect in the western Balkans and for often promoting marijuana in his songs.

He has also written and produced songs for other prominent regional artists, including Boban Rajović, Dara Bubamara, Ana Stanić, Sandra Afrika, Elena Kitić, Breskvica, Nikolija and Teodora Džehverović. Đurić is the founder of the record label Balkaton Gang. In addition to music, Rasta starred as himself in the biographical film 3211 (2023).

== Early life ==
Stefan Đurić was born on 16 November 1989 in Priština, SFR Yugoslavia. His parents, Slađana and Drago Đurić, worked as professors at the University of Belgrade. When the Kosovo War began, he relocated to Srebrenica where he lived with his grandmother. After several years, Đurić eventually settled in Belgrade, where he was reunited with his parents. Before he started creating music, Đurić had initially hosted a show about reggae music on the Radio Belgrade as a teenager.

== Career ==
Rasta began his career in the early two-thousands by organizing R&B and dancehall parties in Belgrade as well as by writing music for student films. Before pursuing a solo career, he had been involved in collectives Prva Postava and Show Program, where he served as a singjay. His debut mixtape, titled Sensemilia Mixtape, was released in 2009 featuring LMR. The following year, Rasta released his succeeding bodies of work, R&B-influenced One i lova in collaboration with Cvija and crunk-influenced Kaseta featuring hip hop collective Unija. Same year in April, he also served as the opening act for 50 Cent in Belgrade.

In December 2011, Rasta released his first album, titled Superstar, through Mascom Records. The album, produced by Coby, was also created in collaboration with Serbian hip hop label Bassivity Music, whom he continued working with afterwards.

In July 2014, Rasta broke through mainstream with his viral hit "Kavasaki", collecting over 60 million views on YouTube. The success was followed with his next single "Kavali", released in June the following year, which surpassed "Kavasaki" in views. Also in 2015, he established a record label in partnership with Bassivity, called Balkaton. With singles "Euforija" and "Hotel", released during the summer of 2016, he solidified his position as one of the most popular regional artists, especially in Serbian diaspora. During these years, Rasta also started writing and producing songs for other popular Serbian performers, including Dara Bubamara, Ana Nikolić, Ana Stanić, Sandra Afrika and Elena Kitić.

In February 2017, he released his studio album Indigo, which was divided into two parts. Same year, Đurić, alongside his then-wife Ana Nikolić, served as the judge on the fifth season of the reality competition show Ja imam talenat!, which is the Serbian spin-off of Got Talent. By the end of 2017, his duet with Nikolić "Slučajnost" was declared by YouTube as the most viewed music video in Serbia by a local artist, second overall to "Despacito". His song "Indigo" also placed seventh on the list. In 2018, he released Don Reggaeton under Balkaton Gang, which became his label The album was followed by a concert in the Belgrade Arena on 4 September, making Rasta the first Serbian solo rap act to achieve that.

In July 2020, Rasta and Relja Popović released a duet, titled "Genge". In July 2021, he collaborated with Nataša Bekvalac on their single "Iz daleka". In May the following year, Đurić released Geto Sport Mixtape, which he wrote while he was in house arrest. In September 2022, it was announced that Rasta would record a song, titled "Preko sveta", for the Serbian national football team for the 2022 FIFA World Cup.

A biographical film, titled 3211, based on Rasta's time in imprisonment during 2020, was released on 19 September 2023. 3211 was directed by Danilo Bećković and Andrijana Stojković, whilst Đurić stars as himself. The movie was accompanied by an album, which was also created by Rasta.

== Personal life ==
On 28 July 2016, Đurić married singer Ana Nikolić. They welcomed their daughter, named Tara, on 7 August 2017. The couple separated later that year and eventually filed for a divorce in November 2018.

=== Legal issues ===
In April 2017, the owner of Mascom Records, Slobodan Nešović, accused Đurić of assaulting him due to unpaid wages of his 2012 release. Đurić, who had pleaded not guilty, was eventually released of charge in March 2019.

Rasta accused his former business associate and producer, Vanja Ulepić Oneya, of stealing money from YouTube monetization of his work released under the label Balkaton, which was founded by the two of them in 2015. Đurić subsequently in 2019 established Bakaton Gang independently from Balkaton. In his 2020 single "I dalje sam isti", Rasta references this case, reciting: "Moj prvi milion u tuđoj je kasi (transl. My first million is in someone else's cash register)". The following month he published an official statement from the Organization of Music Authors of Serbia (SOKOJ) in which is stated that Ulepić broke the Codex of Professional Ethics of SOKOJ.

On 2 October 2020, Đurić was also arrested on a charge of possessing illegal substances. After spending close to four months in jail, he pleaded guilty and was sentenced to a year of house arrest.

== Discography ==
Studio albums

- Superstar (2011)
- Indigo (2017)
- Don Reggaeton (2018)
- 3211 (2023)

Mixtapes

- Sensemilia Mixtape (2009)
- One i lova (2010)
- Kaseta (2010)
- Air Max Reggae (with Bula Adriano, Alen Sakić and DJ Link) (2019)
- Geto Sport Mixtape (2021)

Compilation albums

- Rasta & zvezde grada (2023)

== Awards and nominations ==
Year	Award	Category	Nominee/work	Result	Ref.
2019	Music Awards Ceremony	Modern Dance Song of the Year	"Adio Amore"	Won	

== See also ==
- Music of Serbia
- Serbian hip-hop
