= Ja imam talenat! =

2009 Serbian TV series

- Genre: Reality show, talent show, entertainment
- Created by: Syco
- Presented by: Ana Mihajlovski
- Judges: Ivan Tasovac(2009–2013); Ivan Bosiljčić (2012–2013); Nataša Ninković (2012–2013); Danica Maksimović (2009–11, 2016–2018); Aleksandar Milić(2009–12); Mina Lazarević (2011–12); Ana Nikolić (2016–2017); Srđan Todorović (2016–2017); Rasta (2016–2017)
- Country of origin: Serbia
- No. of series: 5

Production
- Running time: 45–120 minutes

Original release
- Network: RTS (2011–2013); RTV Pink (2009; 2016)
- Release: 21 September 2009 – 2017

Related
- Got Talent

Ja imam talenat! (Serbian: Ја имам таленат!, lit. 'I've got talent!') is a Serbian television series based on Got Talent hosted by Vladimir Aleksić, Ivana Bajić and Ana Mihajlovski. It was judged by Ana Nikolic, Srđan Žika Todorović, Stefan Đurić Rasta, Ivan Tasovac, Nataša Ninković, Ivan Bosiljčić, Danica Maksimović, Aleksandar Milić, and Mina Lazarević. The show premiered on 12 September 2009. A total of five series have been broadcast. The first and fifth series were broadcast on RTV Pink while the others were broadcast by Serbian public service broadcaster RTS.

At the end of 2025, Prva Televizija announced the return of this show under the name "Ja imam supertalenat" (Serbian: Ја имам суперталенат, lit. 'I've got supertalent'), which should start broadcasting soon. The sixth season of the show "Ja imam talenat!", now under a new name, will be realized in cooperation with Emotion Production. The hosts and jury members are currently unknown.

== Season 1 (2009) ==
For the first season, over 2500 acts applied, and the auditions were held in three cities: Belgrade, Novi Sad and Niš. Even though most of the acts were from Serbia, there were some contestants that came from Croatia and North Macedonia.

Finalists:

Contestants	Act (talent)	notes
Pilerovi	young trio of musicians	placed first
Sandra Todorović	female opera singer	
Marko Pavlović	male opera singer	
Karolina Kočetova	young show tunes singer	
Oliver Katić	musician	placed second
Biljana Đurđević	etno (folk) singer	
Aleksandar i Ilija	street dancers	
City Dance Studio	female dance group	
Mateja Jezdić	young drummer	
Marija Lazić	musician	

== Season 2 (2011) ==
Logo used for the first two series.

Auditions for the second season were held in late August and during the first days of September 2010. Over 4000 acts applied, and the auditions took place in four cities: Belgrade, Novi Sad, Niš and Kragujevac.

The first episode premiered on 18 October 2010, but the broadcast was indefinitely delayed. The following April, show host Vladimir Aleksić announced that the second season premiered on 17 April 2011 on RTS.

== Season 3 (2011–2012) ==
In Season 3, the panel was altered with Danica Maksimović being replaced with Mina Lazarević. The press reported that Maksimović and the production company could not reach an agreement on how much she would be paid for doing the show, so Lazević took her place. This season was won by Bojana and Nikola Peković, siblings who originally performed individually, but were put together by the producers before they were put through the semi-finals.

In the season's final, online application forms were opened for the next season. Two weeks after the final, Milić announced that he would not be coming back as a judge for the fourth series. Press speculation identified Anica Dobra as a possible replacement for Mili and suggested producers were considering renewing the entire judging panel.

== Fourth season (2012–2013) ==
During the previous season final, application forms were put online. Over 400 acts applied on the night of the final. On 29 August, Lazević and Milić were confirmed to be replaced by Nataša Ninković and Ivan Bosiljčić respectively. The winner of this season was singer Katarina Kovačević.
