= Devojka od čokolade =

Devojka od Čokolade

Studio album by Ana Nikolić
- Released: December 2006
- Genre: Pop
- Label: City Records
- Producer: Aleksandar Milić Mili

Ana Nikolić chronology
Januar (2003)	Devojka od Čokolade (2006)	Platinum Collection (2008)

Singles from Devojka od čokolade
- 1. "Romale, Romali"; 2. "Devojka od čokolade" 3. "Ipak se okrece" 4. "Plakaćete za mnom oboje"

Devojka od čokolade is the second studio album by Serbian recording artist Ana Nikolić. It was released in December 2006 by City Records, and most of its songs were written by Aleksandar Milić Mili, Ljiljana Jorgovanović and Marina Tucaković, who worked on Nikolić's debut release Januar from 2003. The album became one of the fastest-selling in the region and its most notable single was "Romale Romali", that Ana sang on Beovizija in 2006 and was written by Kiki Lesendrić. Video for the main title song of the album won the audience sympathies immediately and so did the ballad “Plakaćete za mnom oboje” as well as songs “Dum jedan konjak”, “Klovn”, “Verna do kolena”.

== Track listing ==
Original edition
No.	Title	Music	Length
1.	"Devojka od čokolade"	A. Milić Mili, M.Tucaković	3:47
2.	"Verna do kolena"	A. Milić Mili, M.Tucaković	4:01
3.	"Dum jedan konjak"	A. Milić Mili, M.Tucaković	3:08
4.	"Ipak se okreće"	A. Milić Mili, M.Tucaković	3:38
5.	"Ljubiti se znamo"	A. Milić Mili, M.Tucaković	4:21
6.	"Romale, romali"	Kiki Lesendrić, Ljiljana Jorgovanović	3:00
7.	"Plakaćete za mnom oboje"	A. Milić Mili, M.Tucaković	3:50
8.	"Klovn"	A. Milić Mili, Ljiljana Jorgovanović / Marina Tucaković	3:06
9.	"Ko mi to poruke šalje"	A. Milić Mili, M.Tucaković	3:21
10.	"Solo ti, solo ja"	A. Milić Mili, Ljiljana Jorgovanović / Marina Tucaković	3:27
