= Politia Live Clubbing summer 2010 =

2010 concert tour

Politia Live Clubbing
- Tour by Sakis Rouvas, Tamta, CABIN 54, Stefania Rizou, and Eleana Azouki
- Official poster for the concert series.
- Associated album: Irthes; Tharros I Alitheia
- Start date: 14 May 2010
- End date: August 2010
- Legs: 1
- No. of shows: At least 24 in Greece
Sakis Rouvas tour chronology
The S Club (2009–2010)	Politia Live Clubbing (2010)	Athinon Arena (2010–11)
Tamta tour chronology
The S Club (2009–2010)	Politia Live Clubbing (2010)
CABIN 54 tour chronology
The S Club (2009–2010)	Politia Live Clubbing (2010)

Politia Live Clubbing summer 2010 is a series of concerts by Greek pop/rock singer Sakis Rouvas with Greek pop singer Tamta, rock group CABIN 54, and upcoming singers Stefania Rizou and Eleana Azoukia as his supporting acts, with Giorgos Axas as his special series guest. The show was an extension of The S Club concert series and brought the show to Thessaloniki beginning on 14 May.

== Background ==
Following five successful months at Rouvas' self-owned The S Club, Rouvas opted to move the show to Thessaloniki. This is Rouvas third consecutive summer series at Politia; he had first performed there with Peggy Zina in 2008, and continued his own performances in 2009 while also on a national tour, although this performance was not an extension of his Athens STARZ shows. Originally, the premiere date was announced as 7 May. The media speculated that due to further perfecting technical developments of the show it would finally premiere one week later, although the crew themselves did not actually comment on this. This was materialized when the show premiered on 14 May. Originally set for a six-week engagement, Rouvas told ANT1 News that they would also be present in the city in August, bringing the total number of shows to more than 24. The show was similar to The S Club shows, however, some changes were made: the Greek The X Factor contestant Eleftheria Eleftheriou was taken out of the program and rapper Gifted was replaced with Giorgos Axas. The deejay was also changed to Antonis Dimitriadis, who is the house deejay at Politia. Additionally, Rouvas performed in an entirely different wardrobe than his S Club outfits.

== Opening acts ==
- Tamta
- CABIN 54
- Stefania Rizou
- Eleana Azouki
- Giorgos Axas (special guest)

== Setlist ==
A list of songs performed at the shows.

Tamta
- "Tharros I Alitheia"
- "Kita Me"
- "S'Opion Aresei" (Dansonra)
- "Mia Stigmi Esi Ki Ego"
- "Ela Ston Rythmo"
- "Crazy in Love" (Beyoncé Knowles)
Sakis Rouvas
- "Spase To Hrono"
- "+ Se Thelo"
- "Emena Thes"
- "Tha Trelatho"
- "Pio Dinata"
- "Irthes"
- "Den Ehei Sidera I Kardia Sou"
- "Mikros Titanikos (Se Latrevo)"
- "Ipirhes Panda"
- "S'eho Erotefthi"
- "Xana"
- "Ela Mou"
- "Pano Ap'Ola" (Mironas Stratis)
- "Billie Jean" (Michael Jackson)
- "Thriller" (Michael Jackson)
- "Skoni Kai Thripsala"/"Giati" (Stefanos Korkolis)
- "Etsi Xafnika" (Antonis Remos)
- "Ola S'agapane" (Stamatis Gonidis)

== Tour dates ==
The following is a list of the planned tour dates for the Politia concerts:

May 2010
14 May
15 May
21 May
22 May
28 May
29 May

June 2010
4 June
5 June
11 June
12 June
18 June
19 June
25 June
26 June

July 2010
2 July
3 July
9 July
10 July
16 July
17 July
23 July
24 July
30 July
31 July

== Broadcasting and recording ==
Rouvas' home network, ANT1, reserved the rights to record and broadcast the concert, as they have done for all Rouvas concerts since his STARZ performances.

== Reception ==
The show received mostly positive reviews from critics. ANT1 called it "the most-anticipated show of the year."

== Personnel ==
Musicians

- Sakis Rouvas – vocals, guitar, creative director, choreographer
- Tamta – vocals
- CABIN 54 – vocals, guitar, bass
- Stefania Rizou – vocals
- Eleana Azouki – vocals
- Giorgos Axas – vocals
- Antonis Dimitriadis – deejay

Production

- Tony Kontaxakis – arranger
- Antonis Skokos – arranger
- Paris Anagnostopoulos – lighting designer
- Sandy Leulier – choreographer

Tour sponsors

- Trident Senses
- ANT1
- ANT1 Radio 97.5 FM
- Rhythmos 104
- Makedonia TV Channel
- Live!
- Makedonia – Thessaloniki
