= Duress (film) =

- Greek theatrical poster of Duress
- Directed by: Jordan Barker
- Written by: Jim Kehoe
- Produced by: Daniel Sollinger
- Starring: Martin Donovan
- Production company: Duress Film
- Distributed by: Hollywood Entertainment (Greece)
- Release date: August 20, 2009 (Fantasy Filmfest)
- Running time: 80 minutes
- Country: United States
- Language: English

Duress is an American psychological thriller film. The film was initially screened at various film festivals in the United States, Poland and Russia and received favorable reviews. Mark Savlov of the Austin Chronicle wrote about Duress after seeing it at Fantastic Fest in Austin: "With a mind-blowing denouement that makes the last five minutes of The Sixth Sense feel like the last five minutes of Stranger Than Paradise and a pair of harrowing, human (and inhumanly calibrated) performances from Martin Donovan and Rouvas, Duress comes across like a slap to the psyche, a splash of ice-water across the soul." The film was released theatrically in Greece by Greek distributor Hollywood Entertainment.

The movie was written by Jim Kehoe and directed by Jordan Barker and was filmed in Los Angeles, California. The film was the first American production by popular Greek singer-songwriter and actor Sakis Rouvas, who had the primary antagonist role in the film.

== Plot ==
Richard is mourning his wife's recent suicide while attempting to mend his relationship with his only daughter, Sarah, while still haunted by his recent trauma. He is particularly upset that his wife's wedding ring is missing, and she claimed that she would never take it off. A nanny, Rosa, primarily takes care of Sarah: picking her up from school and cooking for her. Sarah is coping with her mother's suicide by refusing to talk about it and often getting into physical fights with her peers.

Richard comes to pick up Sarah after a day at school to be told by Rosa that she was fighting with the teachers and her peers. The three run into Jenny Wilkins and her son Thomas; Jenny offers to talk to Sarah to help her cope with recent events. Richard firmly declines, stating that he would like to be there for his daughter himself. Richard lets Rosa take Sarah back home while he heads to a coffee shop.

In the coffee shop, Richard meets a man named Abner Solvie. Abner suddenly attacks and kills the coffee shop cashier, forcing Richard to come with him to hide the body and evidence. Abner reveals that he has worn fingerprint covers and hidden his tracks so only Richard's DNA will show up at the crime scene. At the mercy of Abner, Richard is forced to do whatever he says in order to keep Sarah and himself away from harm. Abner tells Richard that he should be glad to be able to learn how a killer's mind works, and gives Richard his word that he will not harm Sarah if his instructions are followed.

Richard begins becoming more protective of his daughter, telling her that he will drop her off and pick her up from school. Sarah asks Richard to come to her soccer game, to which Richard agrees. Richard gets a call from Abner and is asked to pick up him at his residence, where he sees Abner hug his wife goodbye before getting in the car with Richard. He attempts to guilt Abner by asking him what his wife would think of his actions, to which Abner replies by asking if Richard would be capable of turning family in.

Richard gets a call from Rosa, and tells her that he did not forget Sarah's soccer game but simply could not get away. Abner lets Richard go to the game, where he finds out that Sarah has gotten into another fight with a peer. Richard reacts very aggressively, yelling at both Sarah and Rosa. After yelling at Rosa, Richard turns around and sees Sarah talking to Abner through a fence. He separates her from Abner, tells him to stay away from her, and that he is no longer going to follow his instructions.

The next day, he is dropping Sarah off at school and sees Abner putting up flyers. The flyer announces that Jenny Wilkins son Thomas has gone missing. Later in the day, he is asked to meet Abner at his work. He arrives at Blue Jacket Realty, where Abner takes him to a remote house to reveal that he has taken Jenny Wilkins. Abner kills Jenny. On the ride back, Abner tells Richard that he does feel guilt and is haunted by flashbacks of his actions, but that dealing with them is the only way to get used to it. That night, Richard has a nightmare about his wife and is awoken by a loud noise. He finds that Sarah has shattered a glass while trying to get a drink of water. Sarah apologizes repeatedly and is on the verge of tears when Richard breaks down and apologizes for his recent behavior, saying that he has seen too much of people doing awful things.

Richard gets a call from Abner the next day telling him that soccer practice is almost over. While rushing to pick Sarah up, he sees Abner drive past with Sarah in the backseat. Richard catches up to him and tells him that he is no longer going to listen to him, and warns him to stay away from Sarah. Convinced that Abner is going to hurt Sarah, Richard goes to his house and accidentally kills Abner's wife.

When Abner comes home it is revealed that Abner Solvie is actually the detective investigating the case of Thomas Wilkins. Richard kills him after finding out the truth, and comes home to a delivery for him. The package is a tape recorder from the impostor Abner, revealing that he knew what Richard has done and that he has seen what impostor Abner wanted him to see, missing the truth because he didn't follow the trail.

Richard wakes up in the middle of the night, thinking about what impostor Abner had said. He investigates the basement of his house and finds the corpse of Thomas, with Sarah sitting beside him, crying softly. It is revealed that impostor Abner first met Sarah in the park, where she kills a bird. Impostor Abner had been “training” Richard to keep Sarah safe this whole time, and Richard is seen hiding Thomas's body in the same place impostor Abner hid the coffee shop worker's body. Sarah is seen in the car placing Thomas's glasses in a bag as a keepsake, and in the same bag there is a silver ring, presumably her mother's.

== Cast ==
- Martin Donovan as Richard Barnett
- Ariel Winter as Sarah Barnett
- Billy Wirth as Detective
- Gina Gallego as Rosa
- Chelsea Smith as April
- Sakis Rouvas as Abner Solvie
- Joey Adams as Sam
- Derege Harding as Police Officer #2
- Cole S. McKay as The Locksmith
- George Ketsios as Police Officer #1
- Megan Ashley as Hula Hoop Girl
- Lisa Lupu as The Receptionist
- Christina Dohmen as Amy Barnett
- Jacob Bertrand as Thomas Wilkins
- Christopher Holz as Delivery Man
