= Beovizija 2003 =

Dates and venue
- Semi-final 1: 12 April 2003
- Semi-final 2: 13 April 2003
- Final: 14 April 2003
- Venue: Sava Centar; Belgrade, Serbia and Montenegro

Organisation
- Presenters: Katarina Rebrača; Milica Gacin; Peđa Stojanović

Vote
- Voting system: Vote from each jury member and vote from public via tele-voting
- Winning song: "Čija si" performed by Toše Proeski

Beovizija 2003 was the first edition of Beovizija. It was held on 12–14 April 2003. Unlike the other editions of Beovizija, this wasn't involved in choosing the Serbo-Montenegrin entry for the Eurovision Song Contest. Serbia and Montenegro made its debut in Eurovision the following year.

The festival was supposed to take place from March 23–25, 2003 but was delayed due to emergency rule in-force at the time in the country due to the assassination of the prime minister of Serbia Zoran Đinđić.

This Beovizija was planned to be the "rehearsal" for next years Eurovision selection. Beovizija 2003 was very different from the other ones that would follow. From 200 songs submitted to participate at the festival only 28 were chosen. They were sung over 2 night April 12 and 13, when the voting was conducted and the Serbian music awards handed out. On April 14 the "Winners review" show was broadcast where the best songs from the previous two nights were performed. The night was hosted by model Katarina Rebrača, television host Milica Gacin and actor Feđa Stojanović. It was the only time a 3 people team hosted Beovizija,

The interval act was performed by Vlado Georgiev and Dejan Najdanović Najda while the turn out of the public to the Sava Centar, where the event was hosted was noticeably low. The event (broadcast and produced by national television network RTS) was the most watched light-entertainment programme of the year in Serbia in term of ratings.

The jury was composed of Sanja Ilić (president), Slobodan Kovačević and Dragan Brajović (composers), Ivana Pavlović, Tanja Banjanin and Leo Martin (musicians), Bogomir Mijatović (singer) and Svetlana Đurašević and Aleksandar Filipović (music critics).

== Winners, losers and the extravagant ==
With 75 points Toše Proeski was the first winner of Beovizija with the song Čija si("To Whom Do You Belong?"), composed by Leontina Vukomanović (who received an award of RSD300,000 (£2,700)). This song became a huge hit in Macedonia and the other former Yugoslav republics. This song was due to represent Serbia and Montenegro in the Eurovision Song Contest 2003 but the EBU stated that too many countries wanted to enter in that year and so some would be forced to withdraw. Serbia and Montenegro (who participated as one country at the time) were one of them.

Null points were awarded to Tempo Slavija, Pasaž trio, Danijela Vranić, Husa, and Jellena by both the jury and public.

The most extravagant performance of the evening was performed last. The extremely popular turbo-folk singer Jelena Karleuša descended from the ceiling of Sava Centar. She performed her song "Manijak" in Madonna's unique style. During her performance a large bed was brought on to the stage by a group of nearly naked young men whom Karleuša danced with. She then jumped on the bed and started a pillow fight therefore ending Beovizija with feathers and confetti flying everywhere.

== Results ==
Final — 13 April 2003
Place	Song	Artist
1	"Čija si"	Toše Proeski
2	"Moj svet si ti"	Теodora Bojović
3	"Ja te volim više"	Željko Samardžić
4	"Miris Tuge"	Ksenija Mijatović
5	"Hladno srce"	Marijana Zlopaša
6	"Seks bez dodira"	Marina Perazić
	"Јanuar"	Ana Nikolić
	"Možda sutra, možda pre"	Аgata
	"Budi moja"	Banda
	"Tvrdoglava"	Bebi Dol
	"Greh"	Braca
	"Hotel sa pet zvezdica"	Danijela Vranić
	"Stidim se"	Darko
	"Anđeli"	Delča
	"Na kraju puta"	Dora
	"Čovek kog sam volela"	Ekstra Nena
	"Prevariću te"	Јеllena
	"Kad jednom odeš"	Lidija
	"Sve je to na obraz moj"	Mari Mari
	"Granica"	Maja Nikolić
	"Oči Kafene"	Mogul
	"Sanjalica"	Nataša Kojić
	"А volela sam"	Olivera Aranđelović
	"Praznina"	Plavo nebo
	"Teška tuga"	Propaganda 117
	"Udaj se za bogataša"	Tempo Slavija
	"Spasi me"	Trio Pasaž
	"Možda nisam dobar za tebe"	Husa

Serbian music industry awards
New found talent of the year	Bojan Marović
Ethno album of the year	Bilja Krstić
Album of the year	Vasil Hadžimanov
Video of the year	Grupa 187
Ethno song of the year	DND
Pop album of the year	Željko Samardžić
Ballad of the year	Saša Matić
Ethno-pop album of the year	Neda Ukraden
Best foreign language production	Orthodox Celts
Pop-dance album of the year	Goca Tržan
Rock singer of the year	Ana Stanić
Rock group of the year	Van Gogh
Pop author of the year	Vlado Georgiev
Foreign break-through	Jelena Karleuša
