= Sandra Afrika =

Serbian singer (born 1988)

Sandra Afrika Сандра Африка
- Born: Sandra Prodanović; 1 April 1988 (age 38); Belgrade, SR Serbia, SFR Yugoslavia
- Genre: Pop-folk
- Occupation: Singer
- Years active: 2007–present
- Labels: Silver Records; DM SAT; City Records; IDJTunes; Balkaton

Sandra Prodanović (Serbian Cyrillic: Сандра Продановић; born 1 April 1988), better known as Sandra Afrika (Serbian Cyrillic: Сандра Африка), is a Serbian pop-folk singer. Born in Belgrade, she initially performed as a backup dancer to singer Mile Kitić, before pursuing a music career with the song "Afrika" (2007), from which she also got her stage name. In 2011, she released her self-titled debut CD through DM SAT, featuring previously released songs. Afrika gained more significant popularity following the release of "Neko će mi noćas" (2012).

Over the years she has had several collaborations with Romanian recording artist Costi Ioniţă, including "Devojka tvog druga" (2013) and "Bye Bye" (2014).

== Personal ==
During the mid-2000s, Prodanović started dating the nightclub owner Aleksandar "Mikiša" Moskovljević, having met him while performing at his Oziris discotheque in Šabac as a backup dancer in Mile Kitić's stage act. Soon upon commencing the relationship with 31-year-old Moskovljević, 17-year-old Prodanović moved out of her mother's home to join Moskovljević in his hometown Šabac where the couple began living together. Simultaneously, Moskovljević took the reins of Prodanović's performing career, initiating and overseeing her transition from dancing to singing, and becoming her business manager in the process. Once Prodanović's singing career took off, the couple began investing in real estate in Serbia. In 2017, after a decade together, the two broke up but reportedly continued the business relationship as Moskovljević remained Prodanović's manager.

Prodanović began a relationship with footballer Vladimir Volkov in 2017. The two reportedly dated on-and-off over the following five years—including a period during which Volkov maintained a parallel relationship, with singer Ivana Boom Nikolić. They reportedly contined dating for a short period following Prodanović's discovery of Volkov's infidelity with Nikolić; eventually, Prodanović ended the relationship for good.

== Discography ==
Albums

- Afrika (2011)
- Zaboravljena lutka (2024)

EPs

- Pijana (2017)

Compilations

- The Best Of (2019)
- Best of Sandra Afrika (2024)

== See also ==
- Music of Serbia
- Turbo-folk
