= Sakis Rouvas =

Greek singer & athlete (born 1972)

- Σάκης Ρουβάς
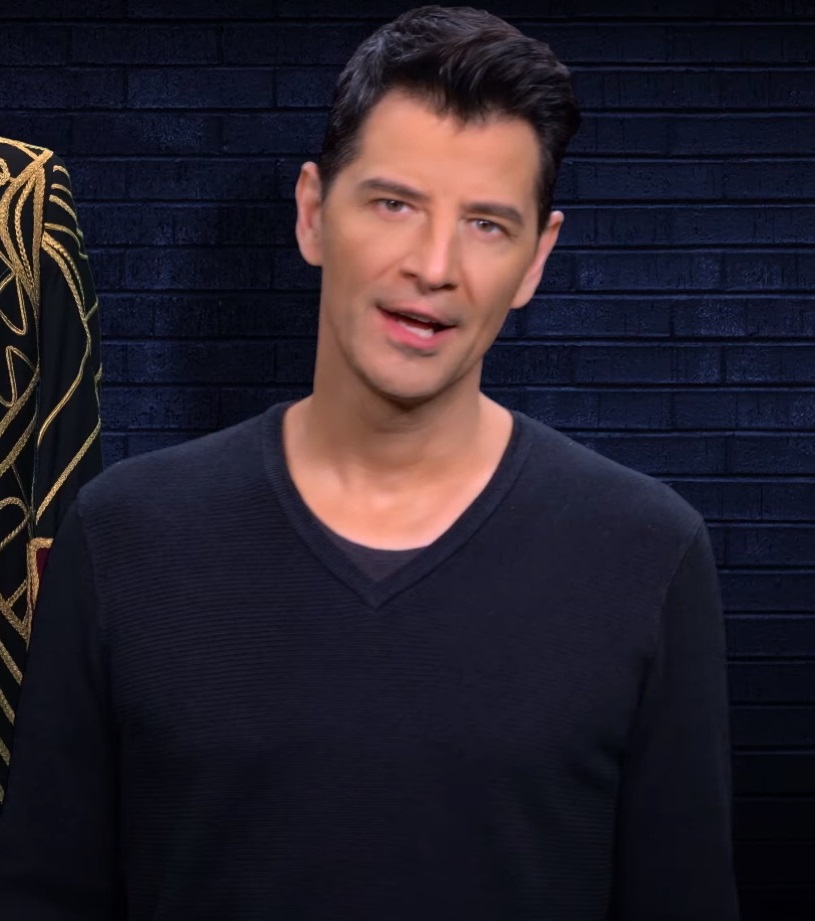
- Rouvas in 2019
- Born: Anastasios Rouvas; 5 January 1972 (age 54); Corfu, Greece
- Other name: Sakis
- Occupations: Singer; Actor; Television presenter; Businessman; Producer; Athlete
- Years active: 1987–1990 (athlete); 1991–present (performer)
- Works: Discography; Videography; Filmography; Performances
- Spouse: Katia Zygouli (m. 2017)
- Children: 4
- Awards: Full list
- Musical career
- Genres: Pop; Pop rock; R&B; Dance-pop; Electropop
- Instruments: Vocals; Guitar; Piano
- Labels: PolyGram Greece; Minos EMI; Universal Music France; Panik Records; SR Music
- Website: sakisrouvas.com

Anastasios "Sakis" Rouvas (Greek: Αναστάσιος "Σάκης" Ρουβάς, pronounced [ˈsacis ruˈvas]; born 5 January 1972), also known mononymously as Sakis, is a Greek singer, actor, businessman and former pole vaulter.

Born in Corfu, Rouvas was a member of Greece's U18 national athletics team during the 1980s before pursuing a music career. He rose to fame in 1991 with his debut album and became one of Greece's most prominent musical artists, with numerous number-one albums and singles—most of which have been certified platinum or higher—as well as widely attended tours and live shows. Over the course of his career, he has released fourteen studio albums, including five under PolyGram Records and nine under Minos EMI. His entry for the Eurovision Song Contest 2004, "Shake It" became one of the best-selling CD singles in Greece, and earned Greece third place in the competition. In addition to maintaining a successful recording career, Rouvas has also expanded into acting, television presenting, and business.

Rouvas has received numerous accolades, including six Arion Music Awards, 15 Pop Corn Music Awards, 26 MAD Video Music Awards, 4 Status Man of the Year Awards, the Karolos Koun Award for Ancient Drama from the Union of Greek Theatre and Music Critics for his performance as Dionysus in Euripides' The Bacchae, an MTV Europe Music Award and 2 World Music Awards. A major figure in modern Greek pop culture for over three decades—recognized for his artistic versatility, stage presence, and influence—Rouvas is often cited as one of the country's most recognizable and marketable public figures. Forbes listed him as Greece's third-most influential celebrity and its top-ranked singer.

He has been in a relationship with model Katia Zygouli since 2003; the couple married in 2017 and have four children. Rouvas is also involved in philanthropic work, supporting various social and environmental initiatives.

== Early life ==
Anastasios "Sakis" Rouvas was born on 5 January 1972 in Mantouki, a suburb of Corfu City, on the island of Corfu. He is the eldest son of Konstantinos "Kostas" Rouvas, an ambulance driver, and Maria-Ioanna Panaretou, who worked at the local airport's duty-free shop. He has two younger full brothers, Vasilis (born 1975) and Apostolos (born 1977), as well as a half-brother, Nikos (born 1991), from his father's later marriage. Raised in a financially struggling household, Rouvas began helping care for his siblings at an early age.

From the age of four, he showed an aptitude for athletics, taking ballet classes and beginning competitive gymnastics by the age of nine. At the same age, he also began participating in theatrical productions, influenced by his parents’ interest in theatre. At age ten, he played his first leading role in the stage play An I Karharies Itan Anthropi (If Sharks Were Men). Around this time, he developed an interest in music, teaching himself to play the guitar and drawing inspiration from international artists such as Elvis Presley.

In 1984, following his parents' divorce, Rouvas and Apostolos moved in with their paternal grandparents in the village of Potamos. From an early age, Rouvas undertook small jobs to help support his family; he has stated that his first work experience came at the age of eight or nine, when he sold candles during Easter Resurrection services (Anastasi) at local churches. As a teenager, he took on various jobs, including work in ironmongery shops, auto repair, construction, and bartending. Academically, Rouvas struggled with reading and writing difficulties, attending night school alongside his mother, who had not completed her secondary education after giving birth to him at the age of 17.

At 15, Rouvas joined Greece's national track and field team, specializing in pole vaulting, and won several national awards with an average vault height of 4.17 meters (13.7 feet). His record was 4.40 meters, a performance that stood as the Ionian Islands record for many years. Although he continued competing until the age of 18, he increasingly set his sights on a musical career. As a teenager, he joined a local philharmonic orchestra and formed a four-member band with his friends. One of the members performed at a hotel, and when he fell ill, Rouvas stepped in to replace him—a chance opportunity that led to regular appearances at local clubs and venues. During his graduation, he performed covers of Elvis Presley and The Beatles. While performing at the club To Ekati, he was discovered by future manager Ilias Psinakis, prompting his decision to leave Corfu and pursue a professional music career in Athens.

== Career ==
=== Early commercial success (1991–93) ===
In the early stages of his career, Rouvas auditioned unsuccessfully for a theatrical production by Anna Vissi and Nikos Karvelas, and submitted music demos to composer Giorgos Theofanous, although no collaboration materialized. Disheartened, he relocated to Patras, where he performed for a season before being discovered by singer Dakis, who became his first professional mentor.

In 1990, Rouvas moved to Athens and began performing at the Show Centre nightclub. His rendition of Michael Jackson's "Man in the Mirror" attracted the attention of PolyGram executives and songwriter Giorgos Pavrianos, leading to his first recording contract. The following year, he made his public debut at the Thessaloniki Song Festival, where he performed "Par'ta" ("Take Them"), composed by Nikos Terzis with lyrics by Pavrianos. Although he did not win Best Vocal Performance, "Par'ta" was awarded Best Composition. The festival performance was notably interrupted by a brief earthquake.

Rouvas released his self-titled debut album, Sakis Rouvas, in 1991. The album topped the Greek Albums Chart and produced several radio hits, including "Par'ta," "1992," "Ego S'agapo" ("I Love You"), and "Gia Fantasou" ("Imagine"). Shortly after the album's release, he began working with manager Ilias Psinakis, who would play a key role in shaping his early career.

In September 1992, Rouvas released his second studio album, Min Andistekese ("Don't Resist"), again composed by Nikos Terzis. The album produced several successful singles, including "Gyrna" ("Return"), "Min Andistekese," "Na Ziseis Moro Mou" ("Live, My Baby"), and "Me Kommeni Tin Anasa" ("Breathless"). The album's commercial performance solidified Rouvas’ position among Greece's leading pop artists.

He continued his rise with the release of his third album, Gia Sena ("For You"), in October 1993. Produced by Alexis Papadimitriou with lyrics by Eleni Giannatsoulia and Evi Droutsa, the album yielded several radio hits, including "Kane Me" ("Make Me"), "To Xero Eisai Moni" ("I Know You Are Alone"), and "Xehase To" ("Forget It"), further expanding his popularity.

=== Aima, dakrya & idrotas and Tora arhizoun ta dyskola (1994–97) ===
In the winter of 1994, Rouvas collaborated with singer-songwriter and producer Nikos Karvelas on his fourth studio album, Aima, Dakrya & Idrotas (Blood, Tears & Sweat). The album produced several radio hits, including "Ela Mou" ("Come to Me") and "Xana" ("Again"). Its release coincided with Rouvas' enlistment for mandatory military service, generating media controversy surrounding his absence and obligations.

Following the completion of his service, Rouvas released his fifth studio album, Tora Arhizoun Ta Dyskola (Now the Hard Times Start) in 1996, again working with Karvelas and lyricist Natalia Germanou. During the same year, he performed alongside Anna Vissi at the Chaos Club in Athens, and featured on her 1997 album Travma (Trauma) in the duet "Se Thelo, Me Theleis" ("I Want You, You Want Me"), penned by Karvelas.

Expanding into voice acting, Rouvas provided the voice of Quasimodo for the Greek-language version of Disney's The Hunchback of Notre Dame (I Panagia Ton Parision), also recording the soundtrack's songs. In 1997, he collaborated with Turkish pop singer Burak Kut on the bilingual duet "Birgün/Otan" ("Someday/When"), a cover of "Someday" from the Hunchback soundtrack. Their performance at a bicommunal United Nations-organized concert on the Green Line in Cyprus was met with political backlash, leading to a temporary decline in Rouvas' public image and a brief departure from Greece.

=== Move to Minos EMI, Kati apo mena and 21os akatallilos (1998–2000) ===
Rouvas returned in December 1998 with his sixth studio album, Kati Apo Mena (Something From Me), his first release under Minos EMI. Written and produced by Giorgos Theofanous, the album produced several hits, notably "Den Ehi Sidera I Kardia Sou" ("Your Heart Has No Steel Rails"), which became one of his signature songs. The music videos for the album, directed by future Academy Award-nominated filmmaker Yorgos Lanthimos, introduced a more stylized visual identity for Rouvas.

To promote the album, he held an in-store performance at Virgin Megastore in Athens, where thousands of fans gathered, causing significant traffic disruptions. In 1999, Rouvas recorded "Oso Eho Esena" ("As Long as I Have You"), a duet with Stelios Rokkos, and the two artists performed together during a summer residency at the Bio Bio club in Athens.

In March 2000, he released his seventh studio album, 21os Akatallilos (21+ X-Rated or 21st Unworthy). Rouvas contributed as the sole composer of the title track, marking a deeper involvement in his music production. The album and its lead single "Andexa" ("I Endured") both topped the Greek charts, with their music videos again directed by Lanthimos. Around this time, Rouvas performed with Katy Garbi at Pili Axiou in Thessaloniki. However, plans for summer performances were interrupted when Rouvas was hospitalized with peritonitis, requiring an emergency appendectomy. He returned to the stage in October 2000, opening a winter season of performances at Apollonas alongside Antonis Remos and Peggy Zina.

=== Ola Kala, international exposure and To Hrono Stamatao (2001–04) ===
In 2001, Rouvas signed with Universal Licensing Music (ULM) in France, following a recommendation by singer Nana Mouskouri. He collaborated with American producer Desmond Child and songwriter Phoebus on the single "Disco Girl," which became a hit in Greece and achieved platinum status. The track earned him the Pop Singer of the Year award at the inaugural Arion Music Awards and was later released in France with an English version written by Andreas Carlsson. Rouvas promoted the single through a series of live performances across France, including one in Olympia, Paris.

In June 2002, he released his eighth studio album, Ola Kala (All Is Well), a project that blended international pop production styles with Greek influences. The album, featuring contributions from Child, Phoebus, Natalia Germanou, and Vangelis Konstantinidis, was certified gold in Greece within 11 days and platinum within four months.

Rouvas continued his momentum into 2003, performing at the Arion Awards alongside Antonis Remos and Nana Mouskouri. That December, he released his ninth studio album, To Hrono Stamatao (I Stop Time), which was certified gold shortly after its release. Tracks from the album received widespread airplay, and Rouvas began a winter residency at Fever nightclub with Giorgos Tsalikis and boy band ONE. The album's single "Pes Tis" ("Tell Her") was released in Greek, French, and English versions, using the same music video for all three.

=== Eurovision and S'eho Erotefthi (2004–05) ===
Sakis Rouvas – "Shake It"
The Greek entry in the Eurovision Song Contest 2004, "Shake It" became one of Rouvas' most-successful songs and is one of his few songs which incorporate Greek and Western music.

In March 2004, Hellenic Radio and Television (ERT) internally selected Rouvas to represent Greece at the Eurovision Song Contest 2004, following an unsatisfactory national selection process through the reality show EuroStar. Initially, the show's winner was expected to perform a song written by Nikos Terzis; however, ERT revised its plans after concerns about the winner's readiness, and Rouvas, who had expressed interest, was chosen instead.

Rouvas' Eurovision entry, "Shake It", composed by Terzis with lyrics by Nektarios Tyrakis, premiered in mid-March and quickly gained popularity. Originally conceived with a Latin sound, the song was modified to incorporate traditional Greek elements, such as bouzouki instrumentation, to distinguish it from other Latin-inspired entries. Rouvas simultaneously won Best Pop Singer at the third Arion Music Awards for his previous album, To Hrono Stamatao. In mid-April "Shake It" was released as a CD single, and Rouvas began a promotional tour of Europe for the contest; To Hrono Stamatao was reissued with a bonus "Shake It" single. The song remained number one on the Greek airplay charts for several weeks, and was number one on the IFPI Greece Top 50 singles chart for nine consecutive weeks.

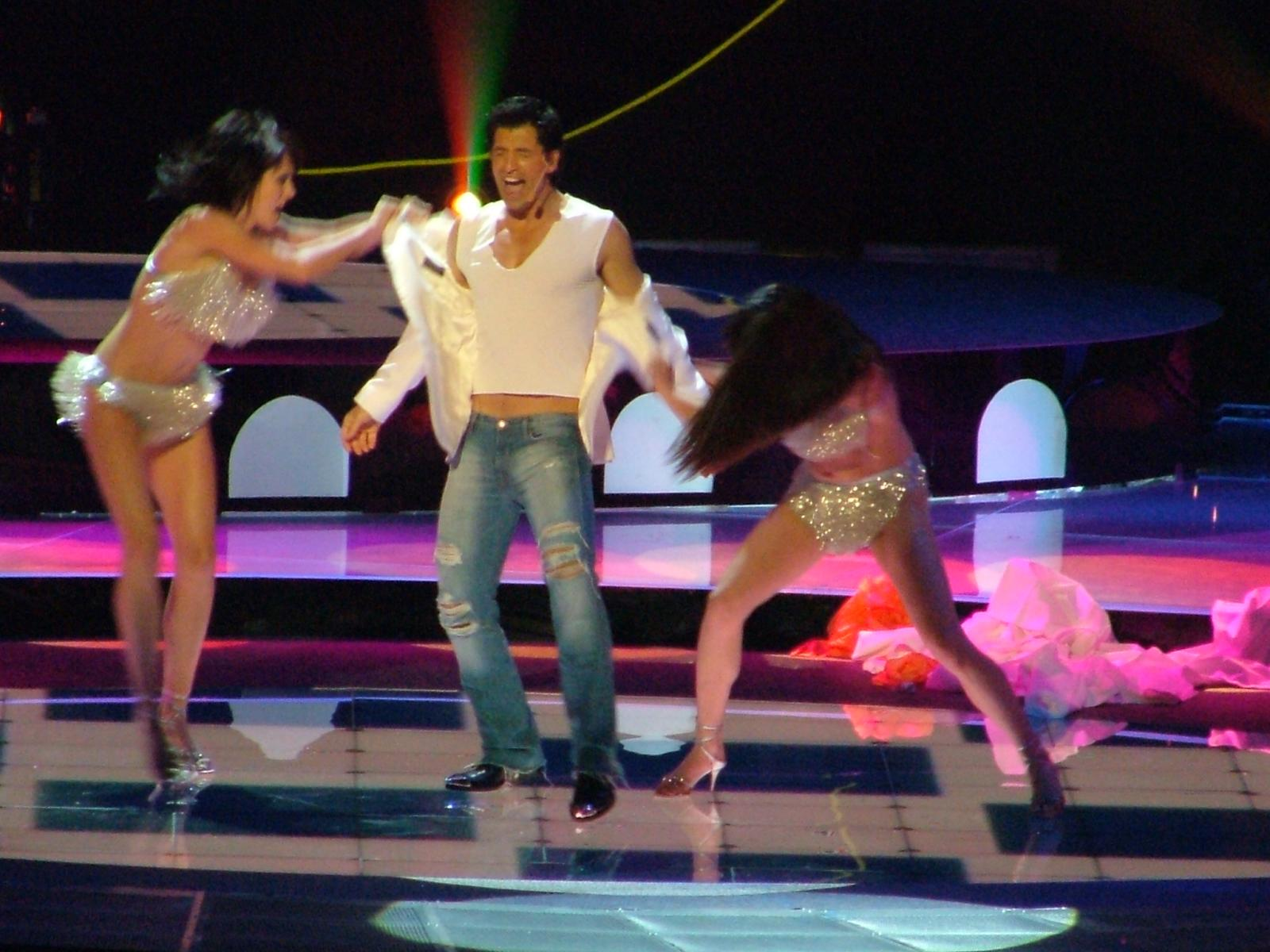
Rouvas representing Greece at the Eurovision Song Contest 2004 in Istanbul, 15 May 2004

At the Eurovision semi-final on 12 May 2004, Rouvas performed 10th out of 22 contestants and later 16th in the final held on 15 May in Istanbul. His stage show, choreographed by longtime collaborator Fokas Evangelinos, featured two female dancers and three backing vocalists from the EuroStar competition. "Shake It" finished third overall, garnering strong television ratings ( 86.7 percent, the highest rating in Greek TV history at the time) in Greece and contributing to a significant shift in Rouvas' public image.

Following Eurovision, Rouvas performed "Shake It" at the inaugural MAD Video Music Awards, where he won the award for Sexiest Appearance for his "Pes Tis" music video. In July, he performed in Istanbul with Turkish singer and Eurovision 2003 winner Sertab Erener, symbolizing a gesture of Greek-Turkish goodwill. In August 2004, Rouvas carried the Olympic torch through Athens' Panathinaiko Stadium and performed "Karapiperim" during the closing ceremony of the 2004 Summer Olympics.

In late 2004, Rouvas recorded a duet version of his song "Se Thelo San Trelos" ("I Want You Like Crazy") with Russian pop star Philip Kirkorov. In December, he began a winter residency at Fever nightclub alongside Giorgos Mazonakis and opening act Helena Paparizou, earning critical acclaim for his polished and professional performances.

On 6 April 2005, Rouvas released his tenth studio album, S'eho Erotefthi (I'm in Love With You), which achieved platinum certification within five months and was later certified triple platinum. Release parties for the album were held in Heraklion, Corfu, Thessaloniki, and Athens on the same day. The album spawned several radio hits, including "S'eho Erotefthi," "Hilia Milia" ("A Thousand Miles"), "Mila Tis" ("Talk to Her"), "Na M'Agapas" ("You Should Love Me"), and "Cairo." That year, Rouvas was honored with the World Music Award for Best-Selling Greek Artist of 2004. In September, he staged a large-scale charity concert at the Olympic Indoor Hall before an audience of 20,000, followed by another concert in Patras.

=== Live Ballads, Eurovision hosting and Iparhi Agapi Edo (2006) ===
On 14 February 2006, Rouvas gave a Valentine's Day concert dedicated to ballads, performing both his own songs and covers of Greek and international love songs. The concert was recorded and later released in April as Live Ballads, his first live album and video, available as a CD and CD/DVD package. The album included three new studio tracks: "Horis Kardia" ("Without a Heart," the Greek version of Damien Rice's "The Blower's Daughter"), "Eisai Oli Mou I Zoi" ("You Are My Whole Life"), and an English version of "S'eho Erotefthi" titled "I'm in Love With You." Live Ballads topped the Greek album charts. In April 2006, Rouvas performed "Horis Kardia" at the Arion Music Awards, where he won Best Pop Album and Best Pop Singer for S'eho Erotefthi.

That same year, Greece hosted the Eurovision Song Contest after Helena Paparizou's win in 2005. Rouvas was selected by ERT to co-host the semi-final and final broadcasts with actress and television presenter Maria Menounos. During the semi-final opening on 18 May, they performed a duet version of Katrina and the Waves' "Love Shine a Light." Rouvas also performed "I'm in Love With You" during the voting interval.

In June 2006, Rouvas performed "Agapa Me" ("Love Me," the Greek version of Julio Iglesias' "Abrázame") and "Na M'Agapas" at the third MAD Video Music Awards, winning Best Video by a Male Artist for "Na M'Agapas" and Best-Dressed Artist in a Video for "Mila Tis."

In November 2006, Rouvas began filming his feature film debut, Alter Ego, a musical drama in which he played the lead role. On 6 December, he released his eleventh studio album, Iparhi Agapi Edo (There Is Love Here). The album included radio hits such as "Ego Travo Zori" ("I'm Having a Hard Time") and the title track "Iparhi Agapi Edo." Notably, the song "Mikros Titanikos (Se Latrevo)" ("Little Titanic [I Adore You]") featured lyrics by Yiannis Parios and music composed by his son Harry Varthakouris. The album was certified platinum, selling over 40,000 copies by April 2007.

=== Film and Television Expansion, This Is My Live and Irthes (2007–08) ===
In early 2007, Rouvas hosted a prime-time television special, Sakis Oscar Songs, which aired on 20 February on Nova. Filmed at a private concert at the Athens Arena, the show featured his renditions of Oscar-winning songs. In March, he began performing live at Boom in Thessaloniki alongside Despina Vandi.

On 10 May 2007, Village Roadshow Productions released Alter Ego, Rouvas' feature film debut. The film, which had its avant-première on 7 May, had a budget of €2 million, making it one of the most expensive Greek productions at the time. Although Alter Ego received mixed reviews, it sold approximately 200,000 tickets—an average success for Greek cinema. The soundtrack, recorded by the cast, included the theme song "Zise ti Zoi" ("Live Life"), which reached the top 10 of the Greek charts. In June 2008, Alter Ego was screened at Greek festival in Los Angeles.

Throughout 2007, Rouvas continued to perform at events, including a concert in Ptolemaida as part of the "Expedition for Environment Act Now!" campaign and a blood-donation awareness concert at the Lycabettus Theatre in September, organized by OPAP. The latter concert was recorded and released on 12 December 2007 as the live album This Is My Live. It featured his final single of the year, "Stous 31 Dromous" ("On 31 Roads"). On 29 October, Rouvas received his sixth Arion Award (Best Pop Song for "Ola Gyro Sou Gyrizoun") from five nominations.

Sakis Rouvas – "+ Se Thelo"
One of Rouvas' biggest hits, "+ Se Thelo" was one of the most successful songs of the 2000s.

In 2008, Rouvas and Antonis Remos embarked on a tour across North America, Australia, and South Africa. During this time, Rouvas released "+ Se Thelo" ("And I Want You"), a collaboration with Dimitris Kontopoulos. The song became a massive hit and a defining track of his career, notable for bridging generational audiences almost two decades into his career. A live video of "+ Se Thelo" from the MAD Video Music Awards was later released.

In July 2008, Rouvas was announced as the host of the first season of Greece's version of The X Factor, which premiered on 24 October. Additionally, he represented Greece with "Stous 31 Dromous" at the OGAE Song Contest, finishing third behind Croatia and the United Kingdom.

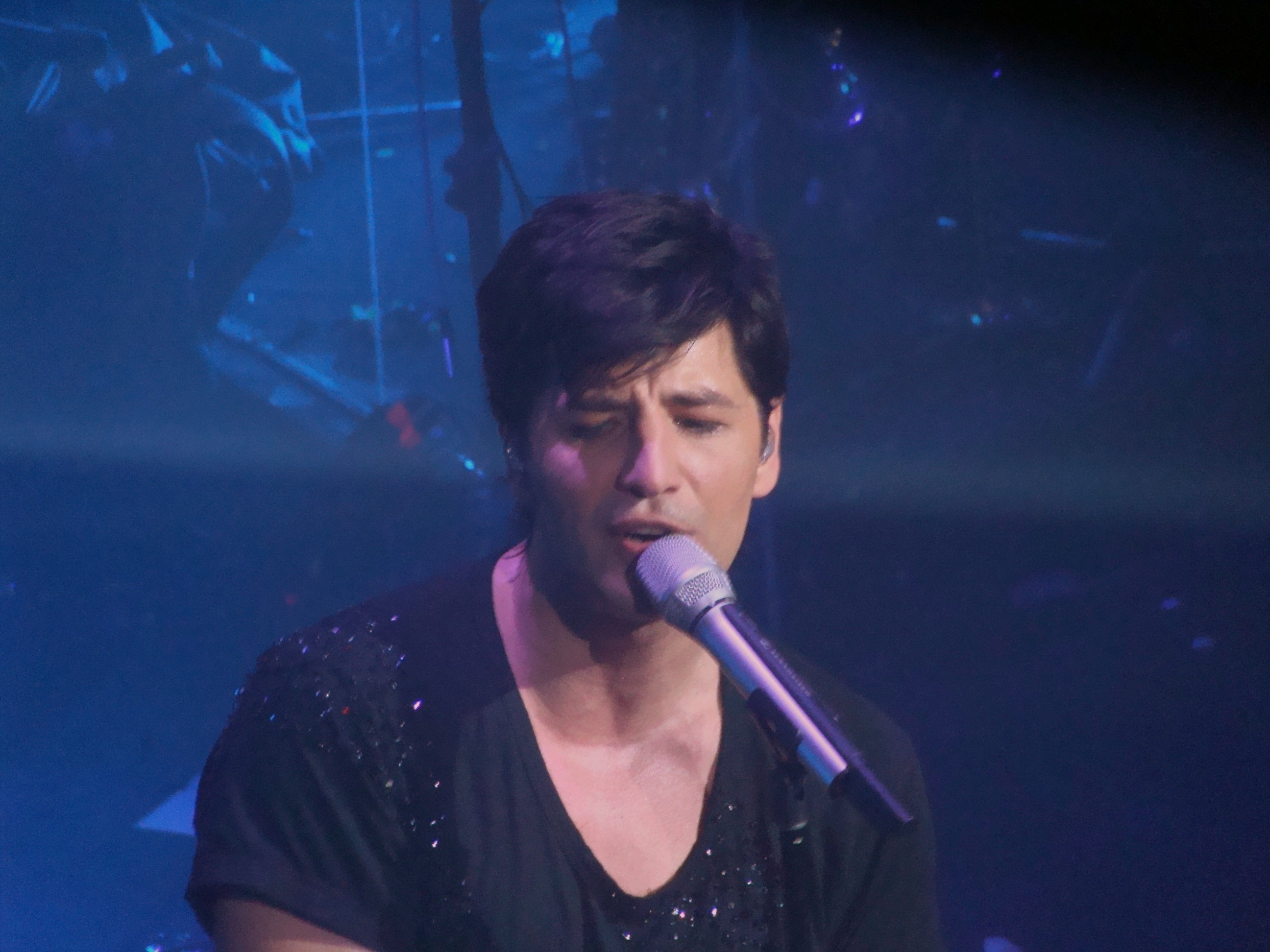
Rouvas at Club STARZ in Athens, December 2008

On 3 December 2008, Rouvas released his 12th studio album Irthes ("You Arrived"), produced by Dimitris Kontopoulos. The album's lead single, "Irthes," released on 20 November, was dedicated to Rouvas' newborn daughter. On 4 December, he launched his winter concert residency at Club STARZ with the Maggira Sisters.

=== Eurovision return, Kallimarmaro, Duress and Parafora (2009–2010) ===
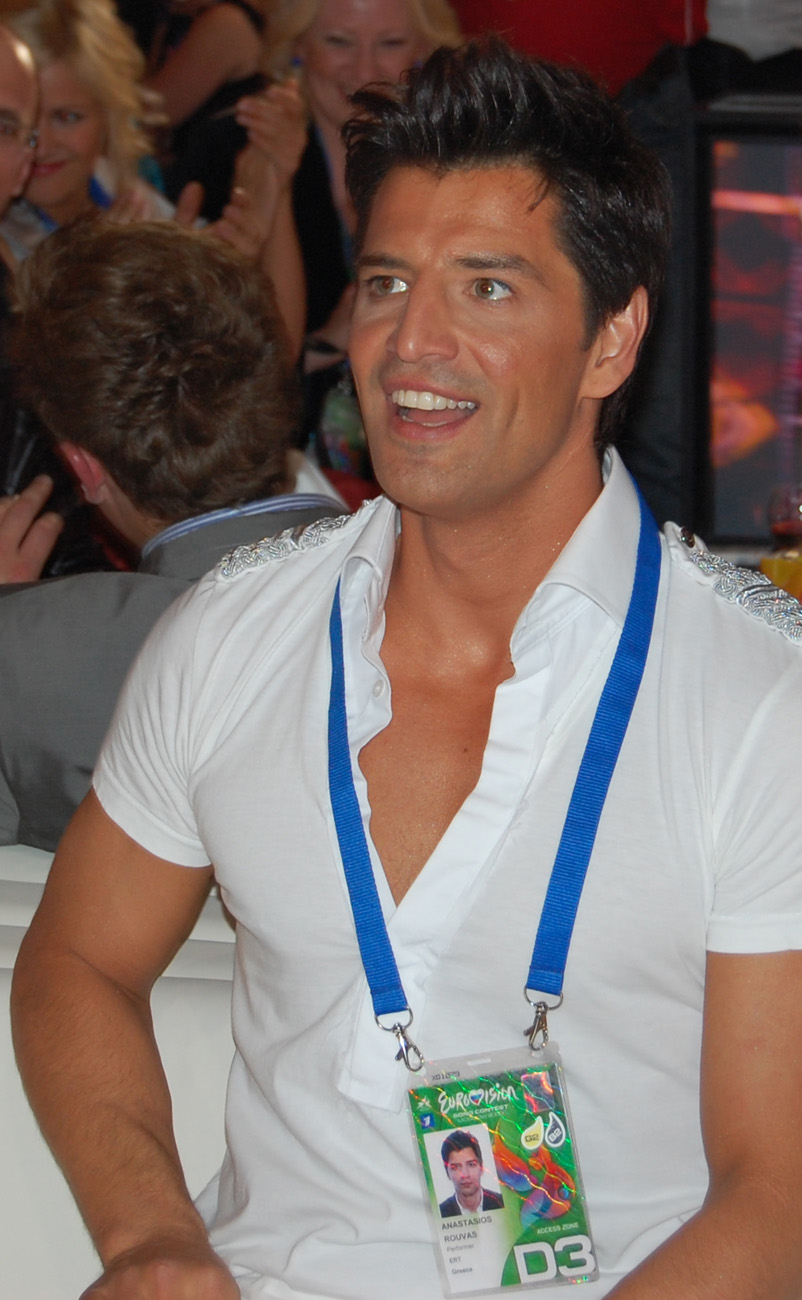
Rouvas backstage at the Eurovision Song Contest 2009 in Moscow, where he represented Greece

Sakis Rouvas – "This Is Our Night"
Rouvas' second Eurovision entrant won the national final with the largest margin in the program's history.

In July 2008, Greek broadcaster ERT announced that Sakis Rouvas would represent Greece at the Eurovision Song Contest 2009 for a second time. At the national final in February 2009, he performed three songs—"Out of Control", "Right on Time", and "This Is Our Night"—all composed by Dimitris Kontopoulos. "This Is Our Night" won decisively with 61% of the vote from both jury and viewers. The song debuted at number one on the Greek Digital Singles Chart, and Rouvas embarked on a promotional tour across Europe. Although Greece was considered a favorite, Rouvas finished seventh in the final. Expressing disappointment, he publicly apologized to the nation. Although the result fell short of expectations, the broadcast of the 2009 Eurovision final achieved a national record in average television viewership, with 3.61 million viewers in Greece—the highest ever recorded average for a broadcast in the country—surpassing even the 2004 UEFA Euro final, which drew 3.04 million viewers.

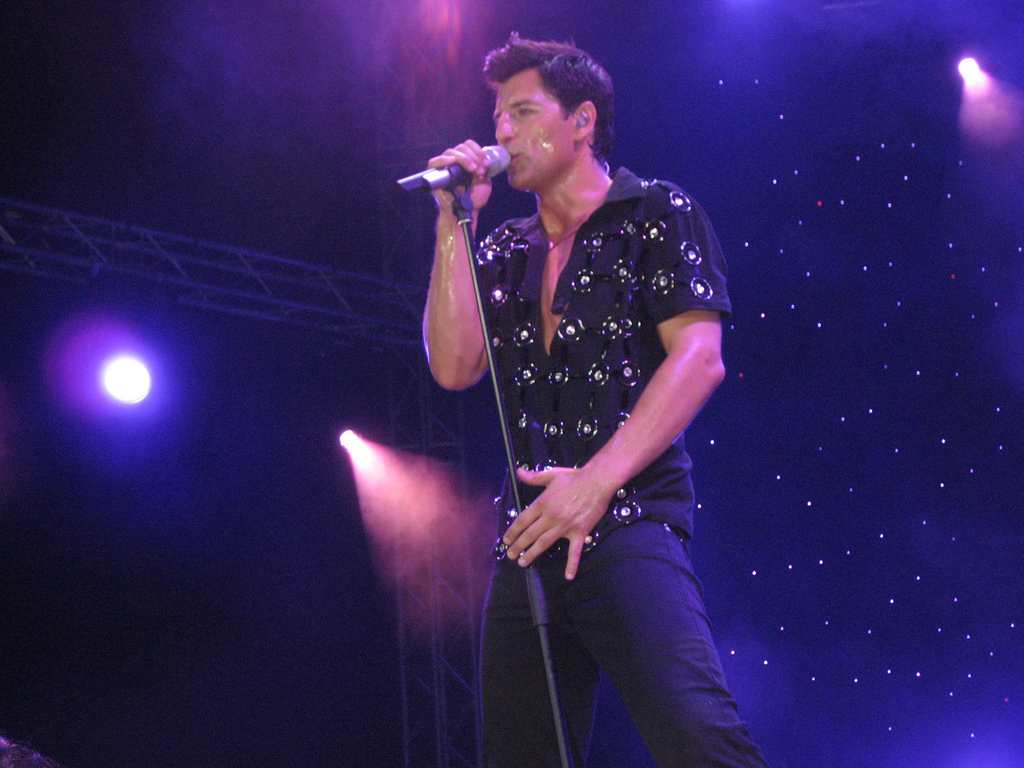
Rouvas at his record-breaking Panathinaiko Stadium concert, 1 July 2009

On 1 July 2009, Rouvas headlined a concert at the Kallimarmaro Panathenaic Stadium promoting environmental awareness. Attended by 40,000 people, it was the largest non-sporting event at the venue and the highest attendance for a solo artist in Greek music history. The concert coincided with the national smoking ban and was organized by the National Youth Council. The subsequent Sakis Live Tour visited 10 more cities and included a residency at Politia Live Clubbing in Thessaloniki.

Later that year, Rouvas hosted the second season of The X Factor Greece and provided the Greek voice for the character Captain Charles T. Baker in the animated film Planet 51. He also starred in the American psychological thriller Duress alongside Martin Donovan. The film premiered at festivals in Poland and Russia before being released in Greece in December.

In late 2009, Rouvas launched S Club, a live music venue where he performed with artists including Tamta and rapper Gifted. At the end of 2009, Down Town magazine named him its "Entertainer of the Decade". On 2 March 2010, the club was severely damaged by fire, with arson suspected. After repairs, performances resumed in March and continued in Thessaloniki at Politia Live Clubbing during summer. Rouvas collaborated with Tamta on the single "Tharros I Alitheia", which became a club hit and won the MAD Video Music Award for Best Duet–Collaboration.

His 13th studio album, Parafora, was released on 14 December 2010, debuting at number one on the IFPI Greece Albums Chart. It sold over 24,000 copies in its first week, earning double-platinum status. The lead single, "Spase Ton Hrono", was Rouvas' fourth consecutive single to reach number one on all Greek charts and won several awards, including Best Pop Video and Artist of the Year at the MAD Video Music Awards and Best Balkan Song from Greece at the first Balkan Music Awards. It also contributed to his win as Best Greek Act at the MTV Europe Music Awards 2010, where he was later shortlisted for Best European Act. "Emena Thes", the album's second single, was released in May and reached number five on both the mixed-airplay and digital sales charts. The title track, "Parafora", was released in October and spent three weeks at number one on the domestic-airplay chart, peaking at number two on the mixed-airplay chart.

=== Continued Performances and New Releases (2011–2012) ===
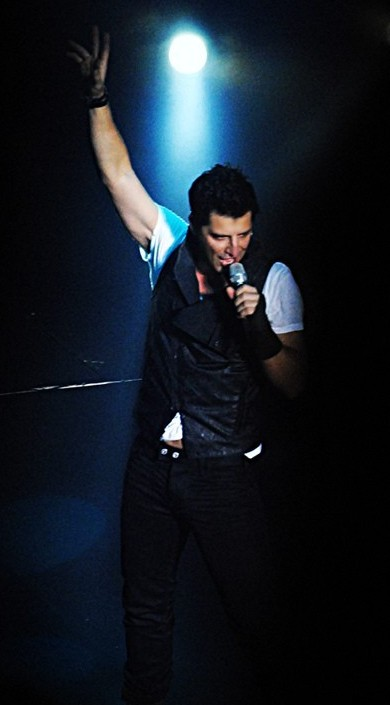
Sakis Rouvas performing during the Face2Face concert residency.

During the 2010–11 winter season, Rouvas co-headlined the Face2Face concert residency at Athens Arena with Anna Vissi, beginning 15 October. He hosted The X Factor Greece 's third season from 29 October to 11 February and was later named Presenter of the Year at the 2011 Cypriot Men of the Year Awards.

In early 2011, Rouvas released Parafora's fourth single, "Oi Dyo Mas", with its music video premiering in March. The single topped the national airplay chart. That same year, Rouvas was named Singer of the Year at the Status Men of the Year Awards for a second consecutive time.

On 14 July, Rouvas performed at the Bastille Day celebrations hosted by the French Embassy in Athens, where he sang both the Greek and French national anthems. His summer tour spanned eight cities from 24 July to 19 September. On 27 August, he performed at the Xlsior Festival in Mykonos, an event in support of the LGBT community. Although scheduled to perform at the inaugural Eurovoice competition on 23 September alongside Enrique Iglesias and Anastacia, his appearance was canceled the previous day for undisclosed reasons.

In spring 2011, he made ten appearances at the nightclub Thalassa. Later that year, Rouvas resumed performances in Thessaloniki at Pyli Axiou and announced a return to Athens Arena for the winter season, with Onirama and Eleni Foureira as opening acts. Around the same time, he released the single "Kane na mi s' agapiso". At the 2012 Johnnie Walker Men of the Year Awards in Cyprus, Rouvas received the Greek of the Year award for his philanthropic contributions, particularly his work with the Elpida Foundation. In February 2012, he performed the single "Bad Thing" with American singer Nomi Ruiz of Jessica 6 at the second MADWalk fashion-music event. That same month, he presented the official jersey for the Greek national football team ahead of UEFA Euro 2012.

In May 2012, Rouvas released the single "Tora" ("Now"), which he later performed at the 2012 MAD Video Music Awards. In November, he released a rock–zeibekiko fusion ballad titled "Niose ti thelo" ("Feel What I Want"). He was nominated for four MAD Video Music Awards, including Best Pop Video and Video of the Year, and won both Male Artist of the Year and Artist of the Year for "Oi Dyo Mas".

=== Theatre, Chevalier, and Axion Esti (2013–2015) ===
Rouvas returned to television in 2013 as the presenter off Iroes Anamesa Mas (Heroes Among Us), a ten-part documentary series on ANT1 spotlighting individuals recognized for acts of heroism. The series premiered on 24 May 2013, with Rouvas traveling across Greece to interview its featured subjects.

That summer, he made his theatrical debut in Euripides' tragedy The Bacchae, portraying Dionysus. His performance received critical acclaim and earned him the Best Performance Award in ancient drama from the 2014 Greek Theatre Critics Awards.

In May 2013, Rouvas released the ballad single "Mia hara na pernas" ("Have a Good Time"), written by George Theofanous. At the 2013 MAD Video Music Awards, he received four nominations—including Best Pop Video and Artist of the Year—and his 2008 performance of "+ Se Thelo" was nominated for best live performance in the show's ten-year history.

On 13 January 2014, it was announced that Rouvas would appear in Athina Rachel Tsangari's feature film Chevalier. In March, he released the single "Se pethimisa" ("I Missed You"), another collaboration with Theofanous and lyricist Thanos Papanikolaou.

His "Ace of Hearts Tour" that started on 26 April 2014, was dedicated to the Elpida Foundation and the Orama Elpidas marrow bank. The tour concluded with a final concert in Athens on 11 October 2014. That same year, Rouvas received the honorary Greek Legend Award from the World Music Awards and was nominated for World's Best Live Act.

Following his success in The Bacchae, Rouvas took on the lead role in the children's musical Hraklis: Oi dodeka athloi (Hercules: The Twelve Labours), which premiered on 12 December 2014.

In 2015, he performed Mikis Theodorakis's oratorio Axion Esti at a concert in Nea Smyrni, commemorating Theodorakis's 90th birthday. Initially met with skepticism, the performance was later endorsed by Theodorakis himself, who personally met with Rouvas.

In August 2015, Chevalier—featuring Rouvas as part of the all-male ensemble cast—premiered at the Locarno Film Festival. That same year, the cast received the Best Actor award at the Sarajevo International Film Festival, and the film was selected as Greece's official submission for the Best Foreign Language Film at the 89th Academy Awards.

=== The Voice of Greece, Cross-Genre Performances and Odeon of Herodes Atticus (2016–2020) ===
In April 2016, Rouvas served as the public face of the Hellenic Olympic Committee's campaign Ellada Boreis ("Greece, You Can"), supporting the Greek Olympic Team ahead of the Rio Olympics. He received the Olympic Flame near the Odeon of Herodes Atticus and carried it along Dionysiou Areopagitou Street toward the Parthenon. Rouvas also participated in the official handover ceremony at the Panathenaic Stadium, joining the celebratory program.

In 2016, Rouvas joined The Voice of Greece as a coach. He also returned as the host of the Greek version of The X Factor, a role he continued in 2017. Additionally, he also led the artistic programme at the Grand Kremlin Palace in Moscow during a cultural event marking the "Greece–Russia Year", organized by the Federation of Greek Communities of Russia. He hosted the 2015 Madame Figaro Women of the Year Awards in Cyprus and returned in 2020 to host the 2019 edition of the event.

In 2017, he collaborated with Laiko singer Paola at Kentro Athinon. He also headlined the 82nd Thessaloniki International Fair, performing to a record-setting crowd of over 50,000 spectators. Later that year, he performed with Babis Stokas, a member of the entekhno/rock band Pyx Lax, at Estate Athens.

During the 2018-2019 and 2019-2020 winter seasons, Rouvas performed at the Estate Club alongside Stelios Rokkos and, in the latter season, Helena Paparizou. n 2018, he collaborated with Rokkos on the single "Ta Zorika Vradia" ("Tough Nights") and followed with the dance-pop single "Ela sto horo" ("Come Dance") in 2019. That same year, he held a joint concert with Paparizou and Eleni Foureira, and also headlined the 2019 Thessaloniki International Fair.

In 2020, Rouvas and Paparizou released the duet "Etsi einai i fasi" (So that's how it is). In August of that year, he inaugurated Greece's first underwater museum off the coast of Alonissos, a marine archaeological site now open to certified divers. That same month, he performed a concert at the Odeon of Herodes Atticus, singing works by composers such as Mikis Theodorakis, Lucio Dalla, and Ennio Morricone, alongside soprano Sonia Theodoridou.

=== Sta Kalitera Mou (2021–2024) ===
In spring 2021 Rouvas released his fourteenth studio album Sta Kalitera Mou, his first full-length album in eleven years, produced by Phoebus. The album reached number one on the IFPI Greece top 75 albums sales chart for several consecutive weeks, and became the best-selling Greek album of 2021 in Greece. The lead single, "Yperanthropos" (Superhuman), and follow-up singles such as "Pare me agkalia" (Take me in your arms)—which topped the Greek Airplay Chart—and the title track, received significant airplay and acclaim.

That same year, Rouvas participated in the collaborative tribute album O Prigkipas tis Dytikis Ochthis, dedicated to the late Manos Xydous of Pyx Lax. In late 2021, he hosted the documentary series Idols, highlighting notable figures in Greek popular culture.

On December 31, 2021, he performed in a televised New Year's Eve event organized by the Municipality of Athens and broadcast by ERT. While the event drew political criticism over its cost and lack of a live audience due to COVID-19 restrictions, it achieved the highest television ratings of the day, making ERT the most-watched network during the broadcast. According to official data, ERT's viewership increased from 7.2% in the previous year to 23.4% during the broadcast, giving the network its largest audience share for a New Year's Eve program from that point onward.

In 2022, he hosted the Greek version of The Masked Singer and performed alongside Elli Kokkinou at Pyli Axiou in Thessaloniki. During the summer of 2022, Rouvas took part in the event Desmond Child Rocks the Parthenon at the Herod Atticus Odeon in Athens, sharing the stage with Alice Cooper, Bonnie Tyler, Rita Wilson, and The Rasmus. He also joined the Eleftheros Tour alongside Konstantinos Argyros and extended their collaboration into the winter season at Teatro Athens. The two released a duet titled "Sok" later that year.

In 2023, Rouvas released two singles, "Ela kai tha deis" (Come and you'll see) and "Ta kaka paidia" (The bad guys). He was honored with an award at the 2023 Mad Video Music Awards for his contributions to the Greek music industry. In May 2023, Rouvas headlined the celebration hosted at Alphamega Stadium in Limassol, following Aris Limassol's first championship win in the Cypriot First Division.

During the 2023–2024 season, Rouvas collaborated with the band Melisses at the Enastron venue. His early hit "Ego S'agapo" (I love you), was rearranged for the Greek drama series To Navagio (The Shipwreck), and he participated in the song "Thema" (Issue) with the female pop group 3SUM.

In early 2024, Rouvas released the single "Ti Matia" (What eyes) and returned to perform with Nikos Makropoulos at Pyli Axiou. In September, he embarked on a selective national tour titled Moments, with performances across Greece. After seven years as a coach on The Voice of Greece, Rouvas did not return for its tenth season. In November, he began a new live show residency at Cabaret Athens. His performances were well received by critics, with Madame Figaro Greece describing his show as “a case study bathed in light,” praising his stage presence and vocal delivery.

=== New label and current projects (2025–present) ===
In January 2025, Rouvas released the single "Kontra pao" (I go against), marking his first release through his label imprint Sakis Rouvas Music in collaboration with Panik Records, concluding his 27-year affiliation with Minos EMI. That same month, he co-hosted Ethnikós Telikós 2025 alongside Helena Paparizou at the Christmas Theater, where Greece's Eurovision Song Contest 2025 representative was selected. Following the end of his Cabaret Athens run, he returned to Pyli Axiou for a limited series of performances before launching a summer tour with stops scheduled in London, and various locations in Greece. In May 2025, Rouvas headlined the Champions Fiesta at Stelios Kyriakides Stadium in Cyprus, celebrating Pafos FC's first Cypriot First Division title in the club's history.

In June 2025, Rouvas released the single "Kounia Bella" (Swingin' Bella/Swingin' Trouble), a collaboration with rapper FY. The song marked a stylistic departure, incorporating contemporary urban and trap-influenced sounds. That year, Icarus, a short film directed by Christos Kardana and shot in Cargèse, Corsica, was released. An international co-production, the film premiered at several festivals, including the Brussels Short Film Festival and the Athens International Film Festival. In September, he performed at the 89th Thessaloniki International Fair, which coincided with the exhibition's centennial anniversary. That same year, it was announced that he would collaborate with Natasa Theodoridou for the 2025–2026 winter season at the club Enastron, a collaboration that continued with limited appearances during the spring season at the nightclub Pyli Axiou in Thessaloniki. Athens Voice reviewed the show positively, noting his ability to shift between a theatrical stage persona and a more mature, introspective presence, and describing his energy as a defining element of the performances. In November 2025, he released the pop single "Erotas Skoteinos" ("Dark Love"), which served as the theme song for that year's MadWalk event.

In March 2026, the documentary Desmond Child Rocks the Parthenon premiered at the Thessaloniki Documentary Festival, documenting the 2022 concert at the Odeon of Herodes Atticus with backstage footage, including Sakis Rouvas among the performers. In the spring of 2026, he hosted the eighth season of Your Face Sounds Familiar. For his hosting, he received generally positive reviews. Athinorama noted that his fame does not overshadow him, emphasizing that he is at his best in terms of hosting, confidence, delivery, and humor.Youfly also praised his sharp commentary and directness. Following the program's strong television ratings, the network subsequently announced that the show would return fot another season. For the winter season, Rouvas returned to Enastron in October 2026, joined by singer Katerina Lioliou. The two released a duet, "M'agapas H Sou Perase" (Do You Love me or Have You Gotten Over It?), to coincide with their joint appearances. The song was included on Lioliou's album. In early November, Rouvas released the single "Krayion" (Lipstick), ahead of his forthcoming album.

== Artistry ==
=== Influences and Musical Style ===
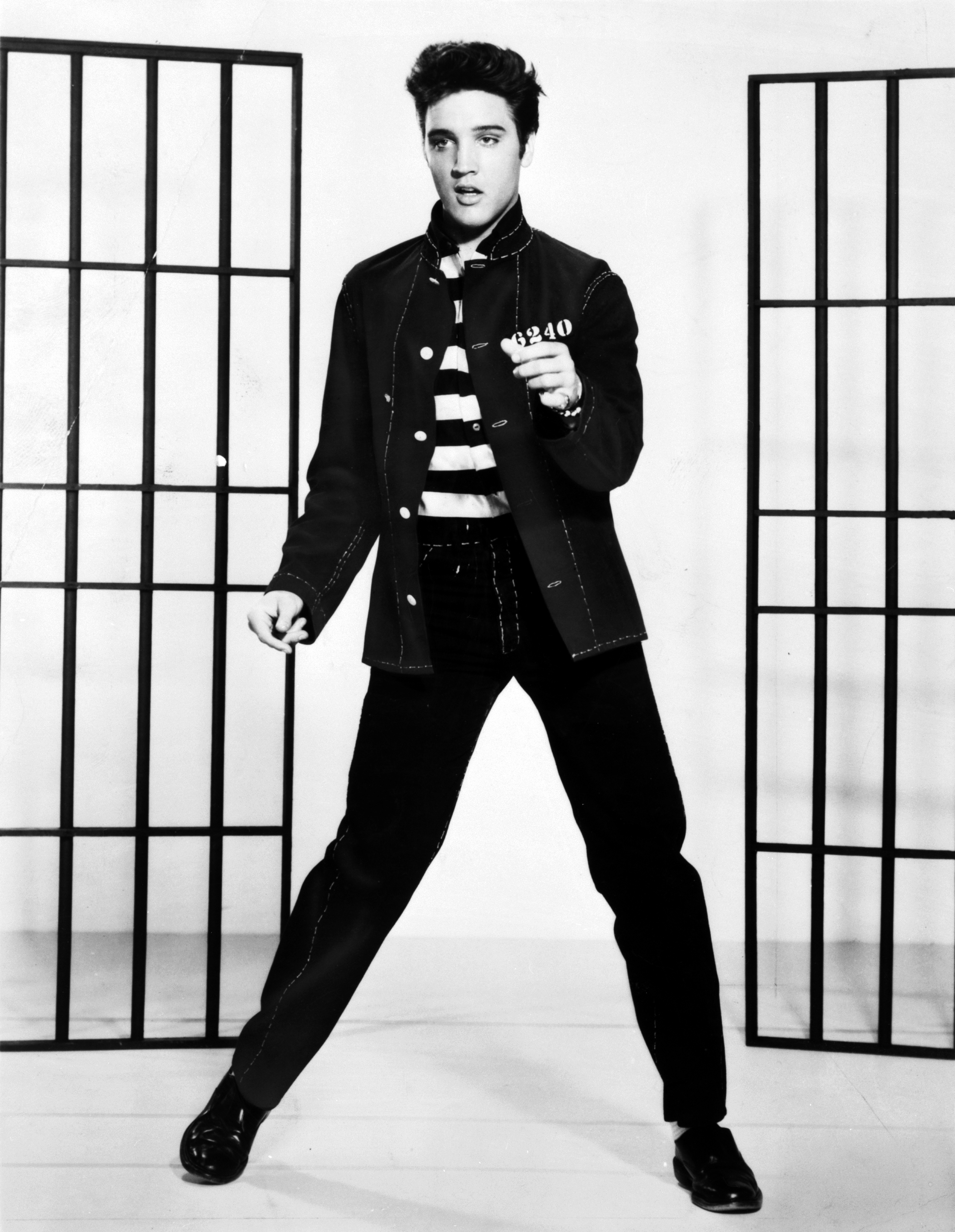
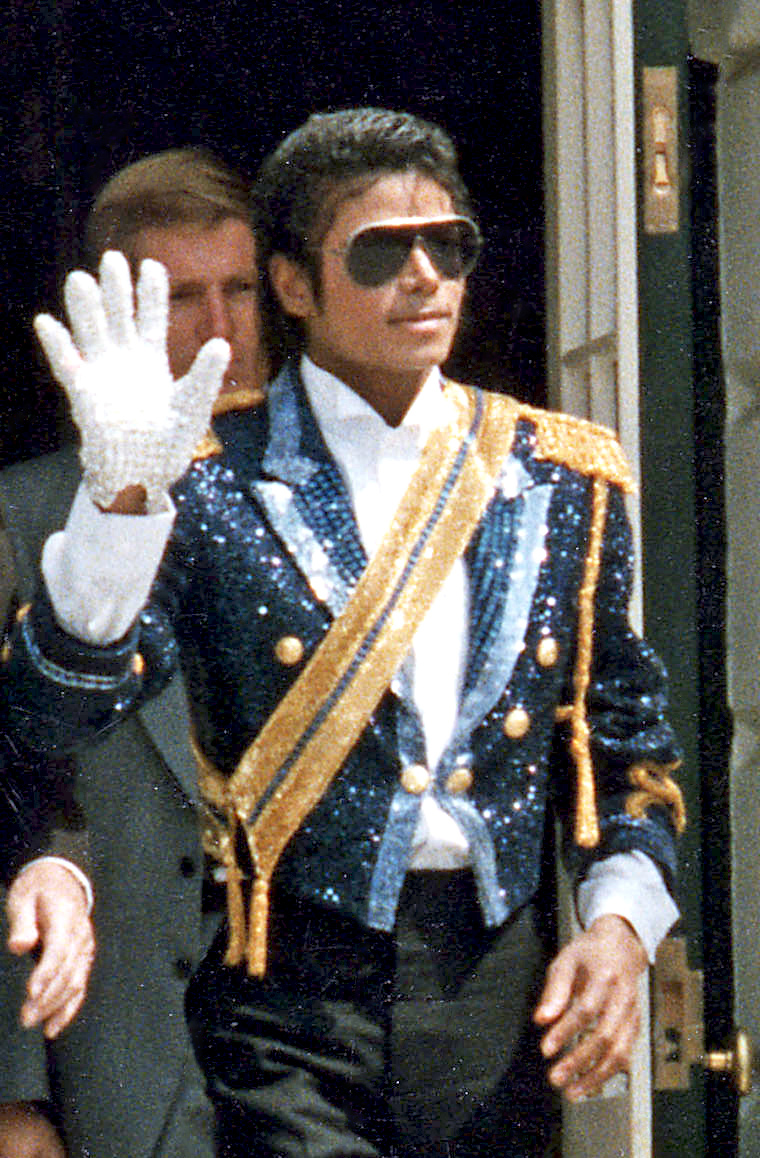
Presley (pictured in 1957) was Rouvas' initial and greatest childhood influence; Jackson (pictured in 1984) was a later influence.

Elvis Presley was Rouvas’ earliest and most prominent musical influence. As a child, he was captivated by Presley's singing, dancing, and stage presence, later remarking that what impressed him most was “the way that he sang, that he danced, that he felt what he interpreted and what I believed that his audience felt when they heard him.” His musical influences span several decades, particularly from the 1960s and 1970s, including The Beatles, The Rolling Stones, Kiss and Queen. He has described Queen's “Bohemian Rhapsody” as one of the greatest songs ever written. Although he was primarily influenced by music from the 1960s, later musical inspirations included George Michael and Michael Bolton.

Michael Jackson was another significant influence. Rouvas has expressed admiration for Jackson's "Earth Song" due to its environmental themes. Following Jackson's death in 2009, Rouvas paid tribute during his Concert for the Environment, calling Jackson "one of the most significant singers ever on this planet and the biggest showman that has ever passed by on this planet," while emphasizing his humanitarian contributions.

Among Greek artists, Rouvas has acknowledged the influence of Yiannis Parios, Marinella, and his mentor Nana Mouskouri. He has also described Haris Alexiou and Anna Vissi as the two greatest Greek female vocalists.

He identifies primarily as a pop-rock artist, though he believes his music leans more toward rock than he is typically credited for. While he has experimented with traditional Greek sounds and has explored a range of styles, he has largely remained focused on his core musical identity. He has received recognition for avoiding the more commercially dominant path of traditional Greek folk/laiko music, opting instead to maintain a focus on pop, which remains a niche genre in the Greek market.

=== Vocal Ability and Technique ===
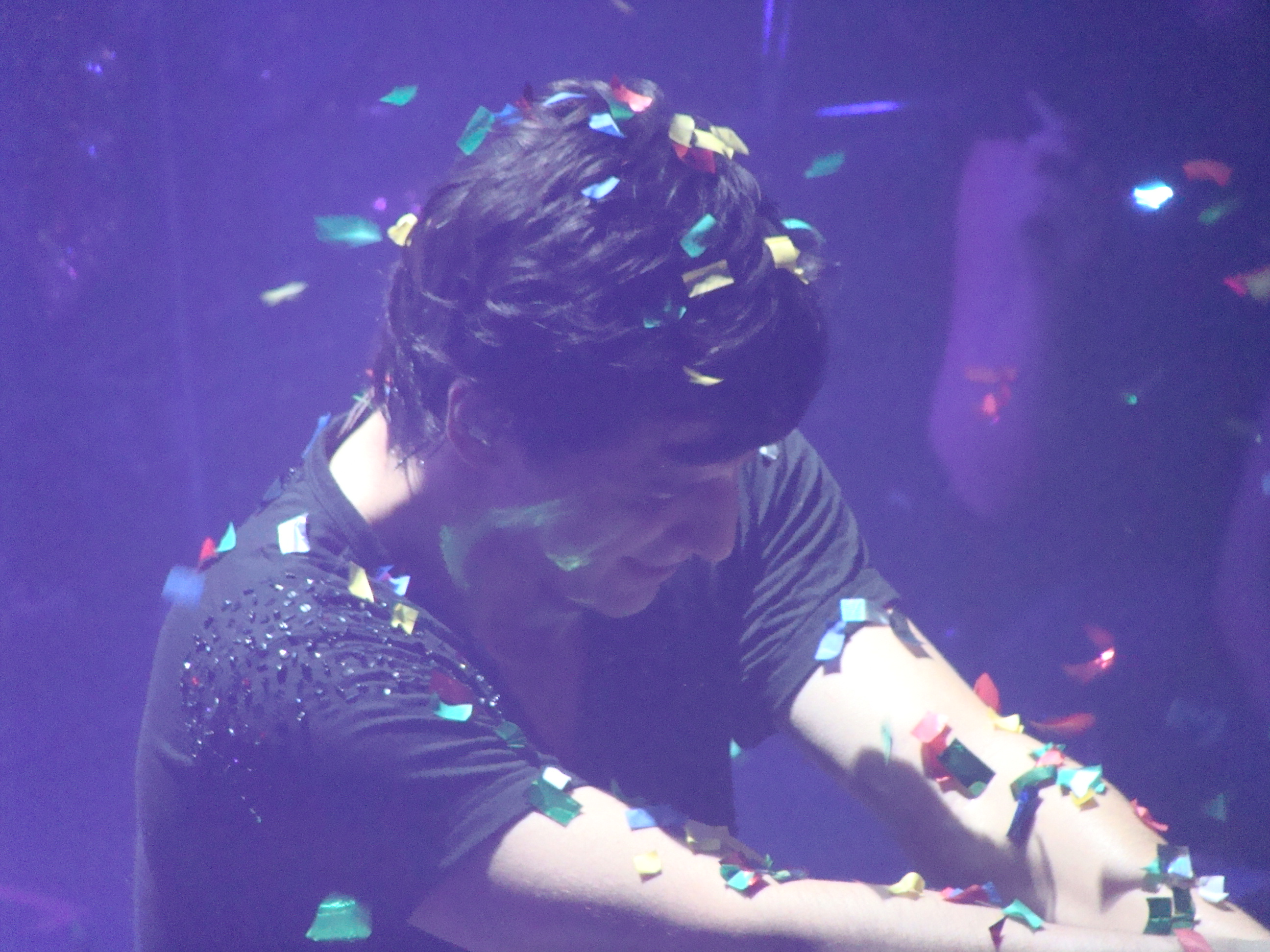
Rouvas performing at STARZ

Rouvas did not receive formal vocal training as a child. While recording his debut album, he reportedly had to learn basic music theory in a short time. Early in his career, critics often described his voice as average or image-driven, arguing that his appeal relied heavily on showmanship. Over time, however, reviewers began to recognize his technical abilities—including range, vocal power, and versatility.

His vocal strength was evident as early as "Mia Fora" from his 1994 album "Aima, Dakrya & Idrotas", which marked the first prominent display of his vocal capability, but a turning point came during his 1997–98 hiatus, when Rouvas studied with American vocal coach Raz Kennedy, focusing on rock and blues techniques. His sixth album, Kati Apo Mena, showcased improved control and emotional depth, traits that had previously appeared inconsistently across his earlier work.

In 2018, Rouvas experienced vocal issues that led to surgery on his vocal cords. Following the procedure, he worked with classical bass singer Tasos Apostolou to retrain and strengthen his voice.

Rouvas has a tenor vocal range; although he is capable of singing lower notes within the F-clef range. He often performs in higher registers, occasionally surpassing the typical tenor range without falsetto. He is praised for his dynamic control, able to shift from soft, intimate delivery to powerful belting.

Rouvas won the Pop Corn Music Award for Best Male Vocal Performance in two consecutive years: in 1999 for "Den Ehei Sidera I Kardia Sou" and in 2000 for "Se Thelo San Trelos". By the release of "Live Ballads" (2006), Pavlos Zervas of "Music Corner" considered his voice to have reached its most mature form. Critics such as Tasos P. Karantis of "Orfeas" described his singing as technically precise and easily recognizable. Ilias Malasidis of "Athens 24" wrote that his voice initially offered more intrigue than his early musical material. Characterized by a sensual tone, his voice is considered especially well-suited to power ballads, which have become a hallmark of his signature style.

=== Instrumentation and Performance ===
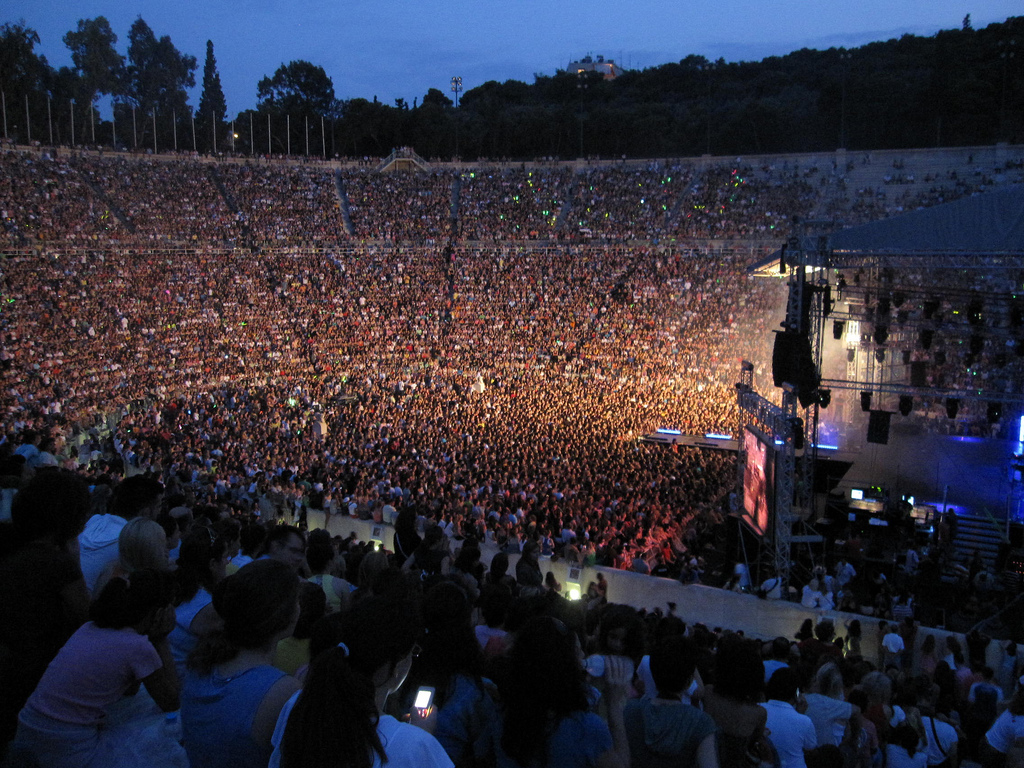
Sakis Rouvas concert at Panathinaiko Stadium

Rouvas has presented, performed and recorded in Greek, English, and French, including hosting the Eurovision Song Contest 2006. He has also sung phonetically in Turkish and Russian— during a 1997 duet with Burak Kut and in the Russian version of “Se Thelo San Trelos” ("Kak Sumashedshij Ya") with Philipp Kirkorov.

In addition to his vocal performances, Rouvas is a multi-instrumentalist. He plays the guitar (both acoustic and electric), bass, piano, cello, and various percussion instruments. On tour, he frequently plays a black Gibson Les Paul electric guitar and switches to acoustic guitar for unplugged sets, such as those in his Live Ballads performances.

Rouvas' live performances have been praised for their combination of vocal precision and dynamic stage presence. Critics have commented on his ability to execute vocally demanding material. Billboard noted that Rouvas is a great live performer, good-looking, and able to sing well in English.

Throughout his career, Rouvas has explored a wide range of musical styles, including contemporary pop, rock, traditional Greek music, and even light rap, such as the spoken verses in "O Iroas" from "Iparhi Agapi Edo". He has also performed in crooner style and in classical tenor repertoire. His most consistently noted vocal quality is his emotional expression and phrasing. Rouvas is known for strict discipline regarding vocal health. He follows an organic diet, avoids smoking and alcohol, and enforces no-smoking policies backstage. Singer- Songwriter Stelios Rokkos has described him as “probably the most disciplined singer I have ever met—in fact, to the point of insanity.”

== Acting and television ==
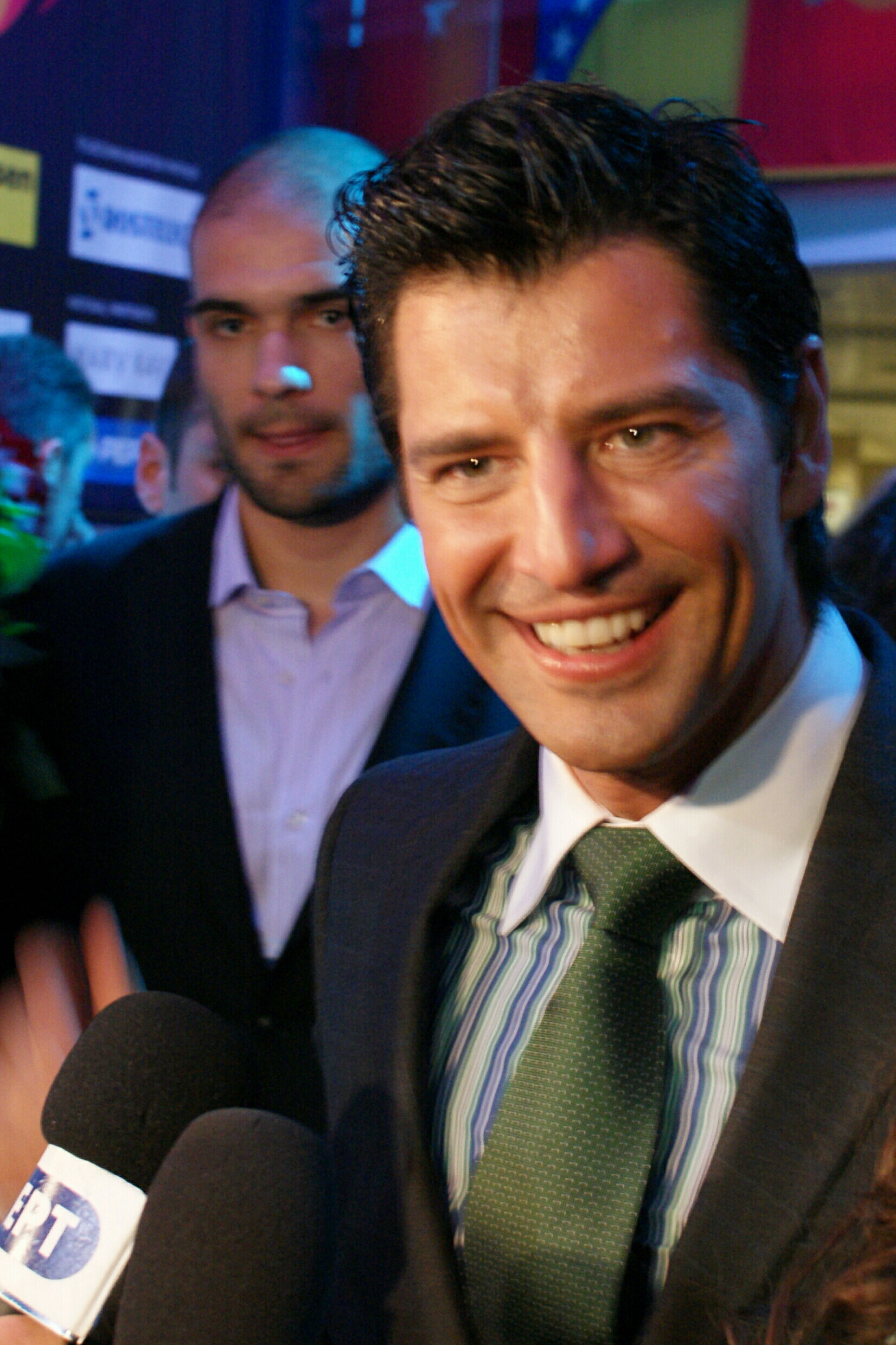
Rouvas speaking to ERT

Rouvas' interest in acting dates back to his childhood. His parents were involved in amateur theatre, with his father being one of the founding members of the Kerkyraiki Skini (Corfiot Stage), a local theatre group. Rouvas himself participated in amateur theatrical productions in Corfu as a kid.

He later worked as a voice actor, dubbing English-language animated films into Greek. This early experience in performance and voice acting preceded his transition into on-screen roles. After establishing himself in music, Rouvas starred in a series of music videos directed by Yorgos Lanthimos. These videos incorporated elements from various cinematic genres. According to The Cinema of Yorgos Lanthimos (edited by Eddie Falvey), Lanthimos’ fragmented portrayal of Rouvas emphasized his adaptability and positioned him as a symbol of sexual commodification in both mainstream and niche cinema.

After relocating to Los Angeles in 2005, Rouvas studied acting under acting coach Howard Fine. A year and a half later, he received an offer from Village Roadshow to star in his first feature film. Alter Ego (2007), in which he played a rock star —a role loosely close to his own public persona—and also served as associate producer, marked his debut in Greek cinema. Reception to Alter Ego was mixed: while some critics praised his performance, others suggested it was too early to judge his acting range.

His next film, Duress (2009), marked a departure from his public image. In the psychological thriller, Rouvas portrayed a serial killer—an unconventional role for a Greek pop icon. Giannis Zoumboulakis of To Vima wrote that Rouvas effectively shed his star persona, calling the performance “exceptional.” Film critic Panagiotis Timogiannakis commented that while he observed a shift in Rouvas’ self-presentation, suggesting that he was attempting to deglamourize himself for more serious roles, he still needed to define whether he wanted to pursue stardom or focus on character roles.

In 2013, Rouvas took on the role of Dionysus in The Bacchae by Euripides. Korina Farmakori of Lifo praised his performance, describing it as "radiant and godlike," particularly highlighting Rouvas' commanding stage presence. He later appeared in Athina Rachel Tsangari's 2015 film Chevalier, where Poly Lykourgou of flix.gr commended his "precise" and "well-studied" performance, calling it a successful addition to the ensemble cast.

Following his appearance as the host of the Eurovision Song Contest in 2006, Rouvas expanded his television presence. He went on to host several seasons of The X Factor Greece. Producer Giannis Latsios credited Rouvas' charisma and musical credibility with contributing significantly to the show's popularity, describing him as "a glowing character with high expressive capabilities." He also presented entertainment programs such as The Masked Singer, Ethnikos Telikos, Your Face Sounds Familiar and the docuseries Iroes Anamesa Mas (Heroes Among Us) and Idols, which focused on inspirational figures and cultural icons in Greece. In addition, he served as a coach on The Voice of Greece for nine years.

== Other ventures ==
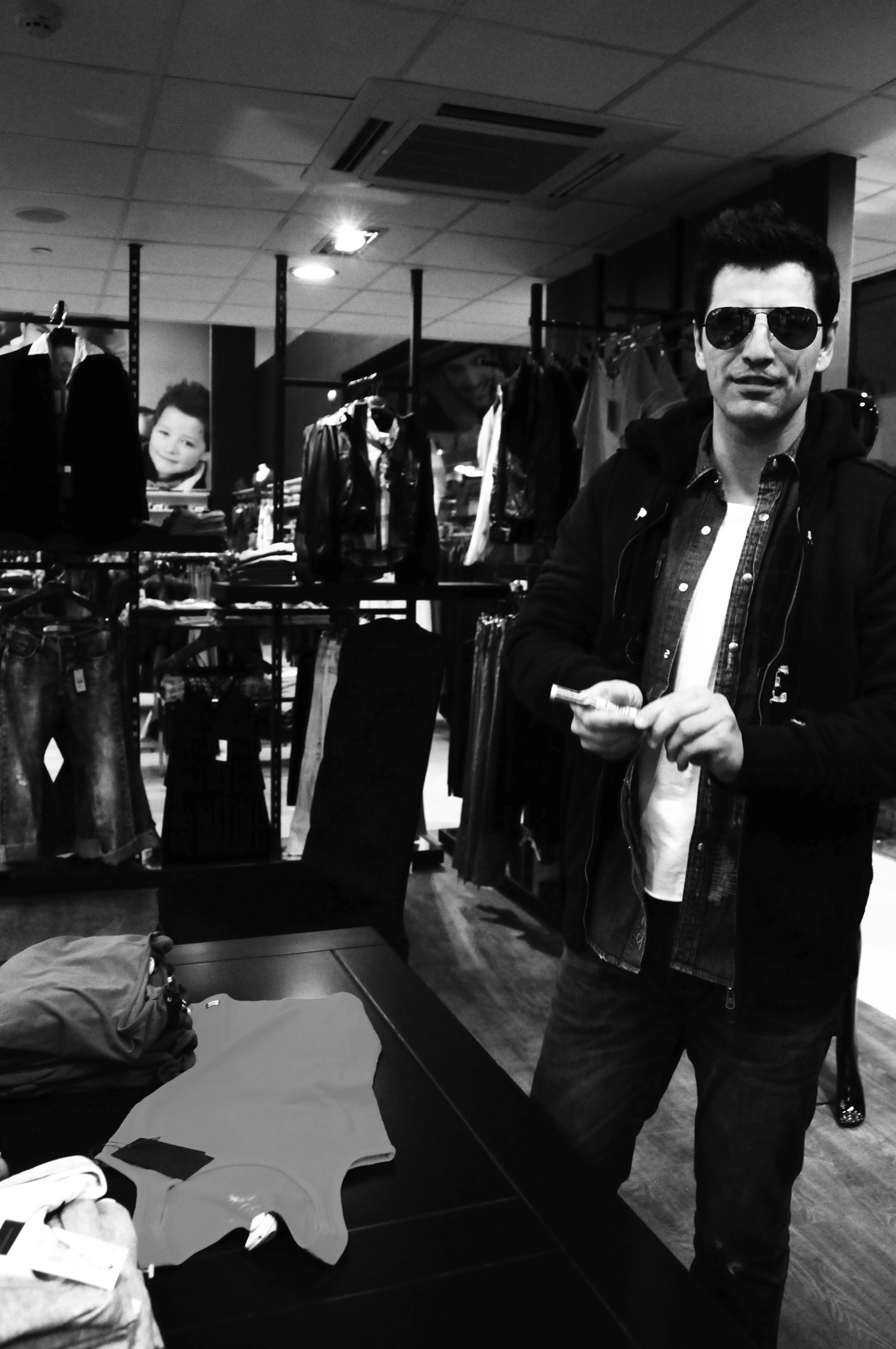
Rouvas (seen inaugurating the Sakis Rouvas Collection in Limassol, Cyprus on 25 November 2010) was the first Greek artist to create a clothing line.

=== Business Activities ===
In 2009, Rouvas and his partner Katia Zygouli acquired a 25% stake in the beauty company Mariella Nails Body and Mind Care and also opened the sushi restaurant EDO. In 2010, he launched the Sakis Rouvas Collection, a clothing line sold through Greek retailer Sprider Stores. The following year, he and his brother Vasilis founded the production company Sakis Rouvas Kinematografos EPE.

Since 2015, Rouvas has founded and managed Gaioanaptixi S.A., a company focused on the recycling and bioconversion of organic waste and animal by-products. The company operates biogas units in Sofades, Thessaly and Amfilochia, Western Greece. In 2019, he became a partner at Amfilochias Gi, a dairy processing facility, and also began serving as an Independent Advisor and Entrepreneur in Residence at Brookstreet Equity Partners LLP, a platform supporting business expansion for CEOs and investors. He is also the founder and managing director of Helios Power P.C., a company focused on photovoltaic energy production. In 2025, reports indicated that Rouvas was collaborating with Bioenergy Crete on a project aimed at converting organic waste from hotels and restaurants into clean electricity and compost.

=== Endorsements ===
Rouvas has been described in Greek media as one of the country's most marketable entertainers. In 2001, he became the first Greek celebrity to appear in a Pepsi television commercial, followed by a Pepsi-sponsored concert tour across seven cities. In 2003, he began an endorsement relationship with Vodafone Greece, which was renewed in 2006. Between 2004 and 2005, he also appeared in campaigns for B.U. perfume in Greece.

In 2009 and 2010, Rouvas collaborated with Kré Kré ice cream and, in 2011, participated in advertising for FAGE yogurt. In 2012, he worked with Trident Senses on a limited edition gum packaging campaign and participated in a campaign for Adidas and the Greek national football team for UEFA Euro 2012. In 2013, he appeared in a multinational campaign for Lay's, and in 2015 he was selected as the Greek face of Coca-Cola's “Kiss Happiness” campaign, marking the 100th anniversary of the Coca-Cola glass bottle.

Between 2019 and 2023, Rouvas was the brand ambassador for McDonald's in Greece and Cyprus. In 2021, he was named a "friend of Breitling" and participated in the opening of the brand's Athens store with CEO Georges Kern. Since 2022, he has represented Theoni, a Greek natural mineral water brand, and in 2023 he became the face of Gillette campaigns in Greece. Since 2024, he collaborated with Volkswagen to promote its new vehicle lineup in the Greek market.

=== Philanthropy and social initiatives ===
Sakis Rouvas has been actively involved in a range of philanthropic efforts, particularly in support of children, environment, public health, and humanitarian aid.

In 2007, he donated the proceeds from his concerts to those affected by the wildfires in Greece that year. In March 2009, Rouvas was appointed a "messenger" of the ELPIDA Charity Foundation, which supports children with cancer, by its president and UNESCO Goodwill Ambassador Marianna Vardinoyannis. The role publicly acknowledged his long-standing behind-the-scenes support. That year, he also joined the Goody's ArGOODaki campaign, donating €300,000 to the foundation.

In 2012, Rouvas was named an honorary member of the St. Stylianos Foundation in recognition of his contributions, in a ceremony attended by the foundation's president and then-Mayor of Thessaloniki, Yiannis Boutaris. In November 2013, he was among a group from the Ionian Islands honored by the Hellenic Union of Eptanisians for their philanthropy. To mark the occasion, the organization released a collectors’ edition philatelic envelope featuring a commemorative stamp.

Since 2013, he has served as an ambassador for the social solidarity program Sιmetoxi, which has carried out over 30 projects aimed at improving the quality of life and education for children in Cyprus, with some initiatives conducted in collaboration with the University of Cyprus.

In January 2014, Rouvas became the first volunteer bone marrow donor at the Orama Elpidas (Vision of Hope) marrow bank, and appeared in a foundation campaign to raise awareness about marrow donation. That year, he also delivered a €150,000 donation—raised through a limited edition Trident Senses product campaign—to the ELPIDA Foundation. In 2016, Rouvas visited the Port of Piraeus, where over 2,000 refugees had sought shelter, as part of the We Care initiative, which provides medical assistance to refugee children.

In 2017, he performed at the 82nd Thessaloniki International Fair, where he encouraged attendees to register as bone marrow donors at the Orama Elpidas booth, contributing to the registration of 50,000 Greek volunteers. That same year, Rouvas took part in the 10th Joy Games, an inclusive event organized by the nonprofit association "Hara" for children with special needs and disabilities, in collaboration with Campion School and local educational institutions. In 2018, Sakis Rouvas was named "Ambassador of Rewarding Recycling" at the first Pan-European Park of Environmental Education and Recycling. The same year, he served as the face of OPAP's philanthropic initiative Omada Prosforas (Team of Giving), aimed at supporting the renovation of the pediatric hospitals Agia Sofia and Panayiotis & Aglaia Kyriakou.

From 2019 to 2022, Rouvas participated in reforestation efforts in Penteli, an area heavily affected by the 2018 wildfires in Greece, as part of the We Can All Together environmental campaign.

In response to the 2021 Greece wildfires, Rouvas, in collaboration with the mineral water brand Theoni, visited fire-affected areas to provide aid. In 2022, he supported the Cyprus Red Cross Social Welfare Program by participating in a charity dinner event in Nicosia.

In 2023, Rouvas performed at a charity concert in Cyprus, with proceeds directed toward children with disabilities and their social integration. Later that year, following the flooding caused by Storm Daniel in Thessaly, he again partnered with Theoni in an environmental awareness initiative, visiting schools in the region. He also participated in the Positive Energy Day organized by Amita Motion, supporting students in Thessaly affected by the floods, through the distribution of school supplies and donations amounting to €500,000.

In early 2024, he visited the renovated Pediatric Clinic at the General Hospital of Karditsa, a project supported by Theoni. That same year, Rouvas collaborated with Technogym to donate wellness equipment to the Child and Adolescent Psychiatry Department of Sismanogleio Hospital. He also visited members of the Greek Paralympic delegation to offer support prior to their participation in the 2024 Paris Paralympic Games.

In both 2024 and 2025, he performed pro bono at the Dipla sti Gynaika (By the Woman's Side) charity events organized by the Association of Friends of the Obstetrics and Gynecology Clinic of Aretaieio Hospital. Proceeds supported the clinic's infrastructure, medical equipment, and services. In 2025, Rouvas visited the General Hospital of Larissa to mark the beginning of renovation work at the Pediatric Clinic. In October of the same year, he visited the remote island of Halki as part of Theoni's corporate social responsibility initiatives, which included providing natural mineral water and school supplies to 286 students across nine small water-scarce Aegean islands, and the announcement of a nationwide student competition on sustainability and environmental awareness. On 16 September 2026, Rouvas performed at a sold-out concert in Larnaca, Cyprus, with the proceeds benefiting PASYKAF's services for people affected by cancer and their families.

== Public Image ==
Sakis Rouvas has been a leading figure in Greek pop culture since the early 1990s. Rising to fame as a youth idol, he cultivated an image centered on physical fitness, dynamic performances, sexuality, and a rebellious spirit that appealed to younger audiences. His early career featured daring fashion choices, provocative performances, and a carefully guarded personal life, contributing to his public mystique. From early on, he inspired a passionate fan culture. Around 1994, the term "Rouvitses" emerged to describe his predominantly young and devoted female fans—an unprecedented phenomenon in Greek popular music.

In 1998, Rouvas drew widespread attention for wearing a skirt-like outfit during a residency performance, an act that was praised by some for challenging gender norms but criticized by more conservative segments of society. His public image evolved notably after 2004 following his Eurovision appearances and the end of his collaboration with long-time manager Ilias Psinakis. He began to be viewed not only as a pop icon but also as a more mature and widely likable public figure. While he later expanded into cinema and theater and explored more nuanced musical styles, his public image remained that of a "poster boy" for personal success, positive energy, and self-actualization across various media.

Rouvas has acknowledged the differing perceptions of his persona, stating, "Everyone sees in me what they want to see... a good boy, a troublemaker, or a fleeting presence, like a shooting star." His extensive involvement in commercial projects, endorsements, and advertising has attracted both acclaim and criticism. While some admire his marketing acumen, others argue that his focus on image has, at times, overshadowed his artistic contributions.

Despite periodic controversies, Rouvas has sustained a prominent public presence. His lasting appeal has been attributed to his charisma, his reputation as a "good boy" figure, his disarming sincerity in interviews, and commitment to philanthropic work. Forbes ranked him as the most influential singer in Greece and the third-most influential Greek celebrity overall. He is consistently cited in Greek media as the country's leading star.

=== Political views ===
In 2012, Rouvas publicly expressed his support for the LGBTQ community, advocating for equal rights and greater social acceptance.

During the 2015 Greek bailout referendum, he uploaded a video message titled "Yes We Are Europe" to his YouTube channel, encouraging a pro-European Union vote.

In 2020, during a parliamentary speech, Syriza MP Pavlos Polakis implied that Rouvas had previously expressed support for the far-right political party Golden Dawn. Rouvas issued a cease and desist letter against Polakis, demanding a retraction and threatening legal action.

=== Controversies ===
In 1994, at the age of 22, Rouvas was called to complete mandatory military service. His request for deferment was denied, despite other artists at the time being granted postponements for career reasons. Rouvas cited agoraphobia as the reason for his reluctance to serve, a claim that was met with media skepticism and public criticism. He was evaluated at the Penteli Psychiatric Hospital and later transferred to the 9th Infantry Regiment in Kalamata, where he spent ten days in isolation. He ultimately completed his military service at the 501st Mechanized Infantry Battalion in Giannitsa.

On 19 May 1997, Rouvas performed with Turkish singer Burak Kut at a bicommunal reconciliation concert on the Green Line in Cyprus, which aimed to promote peace between Greek and Turkish Cypriots, before an audience of over 4,000. The concert, held near the Green Line, received international attention and earned Rouvas the International Abdi Ipekçi Prize for global understanding. However, it was met with backlash from Greek and Turkish nationalists, resulting in protests and violent demonstrations. Rouvas subsequently relocated to the United States for six months following the controversy.

In the summer of 2000, Rouvas, his manager, and several other celebrities were in Mykonos aboard a yacht owned by a local physician. Rouvas had traveled to the island for a photoshoot, and the physician had offered to transport him in order to help him avoid media attention. Initially, Rouvas declined the offer. Shortly after he disembarked, police raided the yacht and discovered narcotics on board. Although the physician admitted that the drugs were his, all guests were questioned by authorities. The incident received widespread media coverage, and the phrase Imoun ki ego sto kotero! (I was on the yacht, too!) became a popular slogan in Greece, appearing on T-shirts and in popular culture.

In 2001, Rouvas appeared in a controversial Pepsi advertisement, which featured him semi-nude, holding a bottle of Pepsi in front of his genitals. The ad received backlash from women's rights groups and parental associations, who criticized the perceived sexualization of the product.

== Personal life ==
During the early years of his career, Rouvas lived with a woman named Sally, with whom he had begun a relationship on Corfu. After their breakup, the media indulged in speculation about Rouvas' personal life and potential relationships with model Zeta Logotheti, Corfu bar manager Sofi Kantarou, and singer Elli Kokkinou, as Rouvas himself remained guarded and reclusive about his personal affairs. In 2003, Rouvas entered into a public relationship with London-based Taiwanese producer Rebecca Wang, but their relationship lasted only a few months.

Rouvas has been in a relationship with model Aikaterini "Katia" Zygouli since 2003. The couple first met at an award ceremony and later that year worked together on a commercial. Together, they have four children: Anastasia (2008), Alexandros (2011), Ariadni (2013), and Apollonas (2016). They married on 3 July 2017 in a Greek Orthodox ceremony, with Vardis and Marianna Vardinogiannis serving as koumbaroi.

Although he transitioned from professional athletics to a music career, Rouvas continued to train in pole vault alongside Olympic medalists such as Katerina Stefanidi and Emmanouil Karalis. He holds a purple belt in Brazilian jiu-jitsu and has participated in golf tournaments. Additionally, he practices freediving and is an avid cyclist.

Rouvas has stated that he experienced corporal punishment during primary school related to severe dyslexia, a condition he has said persists into adulthood. He has also acknowledged having experienced depression and panic attacks in the past.

== Discography ==
Studio albums

- Sakis Rouvas (1991)
- Min andistekesai (1992)
- Gia Sena (1993)
- Aima, Dakrya & Idrotas (1994)
- Tora Arhizoun Ta Dyskola (1996)
- Kati Apo Mena (1998)
- 21os Akatallilos (2000)
- Ola Kala (2002)
- To Hrono Stamatao (2003)
- S'eho Erotefthi (2005)
- Iparhi Agapi Edo (2006)
- Irthes (2008)
- Parafora (2010)
- Sta Kalitera Mou (2021)

Live albums

- Live Ballads (2006)
- This Is My Live (2007)

== Filmography ==
Films
Year	Title	Role	Notes and Awards
1996	The Hunchback of Notre Dame	Quasimodo	Protagonist, Greek voice-dub
2006	Cars	Lightning McQueen	Protagonist, Greek voice-dub
2007	Alter Ego	Stefanos	Protagonist; Also associate producer
2009	Duress	Abner Solvie	Antagonist
2009	Planet 51	Captain Charles "Chuck" T. Baker	Protagonist, Greek voice-dub
2011	Cars 2	Lightning McQueen	Protagonist, Greek voice-dub
2015	Chevalier	Christos	Protagonist
2017	Cars 3	Lightning McQueen	Protagonist, Greek voice-dub
2025	Icarus	Alex	Short film
2026	Desmond Child Rocks the Parthenon	Himself	Documentary
Television
Year	Title	Role	Notes and Awards
1996	Kalinyhta Mama (Goodnight Mommy)	Himself	1 episode
2004	Summer Olympics	Himself	Performance in the closing ceremony
2006	Eurovision Song Contest 2006	Host	
2008–2011, 2016–2017	The X Factor Greece	Host	* Johnnie Walker Man of the Year Award for Presenter of the Year (2011)
2013	Iroes anamesa mas (Heroes Among Us)	Host	Docuseries
2016	Olympic Flame Handover Ceremony	Himself	Performance
2016, 2020	Madame Figaro Cyprus Women of the Year	Host	
2016–2023	The Voice of Greece	Coach	
2021-2022	Idols	Host	Docuseries
2022	The Masked Singer	Host	
2025	Ethnikós Telikós 2025	Host	
2026	Your Face Sounds Familiar	Host	
Theater
Year	Title	Role	Notes and Awards
2013	The Bacchae	Dionysus	Theatrical debut
2015	Hercules- 12 labours	Hercules	

Key
†	Denotes films that have not yet been released

== Tours and residencies ==
=== Concert tours ===
- Tora Arhizoun Ta Dyskola Summer Tour (1997)
- Pepsi Tour (2001)
- Ola Kala World Tour (2002)
- Sakis Live in Town Tour (2003)
- Sakis on Stage Tour (2005)
- Fire Victims Tour (2007)
- Antonis Remos – Sakis Rouvas World Tour (2008)
- Kalokairino Randevou me ton Saki Tour (2008)
- Sakis Live Tour (2009)
- Sakis Summer Tour (2010)
- Ace of Hearts Tour (2014)
- Eleftheros Tour (Guest act) (2022)
- Moments (2024)

=== Concert residencies ===
- To Ekati (1990)
- Athens Show Center (1991)
- Posidonio (1992)
- Posidonio (with Kaiti Garbi) (1994)
- Chaos (with Anna Vissi) (1996)
- Pyli Axiou (1997)
- Chaos (1998)
- Vio Vio (with Stelios Rokkos and Peggy Zina) (1999) (with Kaiti Garbi) (2000)
- Pyli Axiou (2000)
- Apollonas (2000–01)
- Rex (with Despina Vandi and Kostas Doxas) (2001–2002)
- Fever (2003–04)
- Fever (with Giorgos Mazonakis and Helena Paparizou) (2004–05)
- Boom (with Despina Vandi) (2007)
- Politia (2008)
- STARZ (2008–09)
- Politia Live Clubbing (2009)
- The S Club (with Tamta) (2009–2010)
- Politia Live Clubbing (with Tamta) (2010)
- Face2Face (with Anna Vissi) (2010–11)
- The S Club at Thalassa: People's Stage (with Tamta) (2011)
- Pyli Axiou (with Tamta and Eleni Foureira) (2011)
- Diogenis S Club (with Angeliki Iliadi and Melisses) (2011)
- Underworld S Club ( with Onirama and Eleni Foureira) (2011–2012)
- Underworld S Club at Politia Live Clubbing (with Onirama) (2012)
- The S Club at Thalassa: People's Stage (with Penelope Anastasopoulou) (2012–2013)
- Estate Athens Club (with Onirama) (2015–2016)
- Kentro Athinon (with Paola and Tamta) (2016–2017)
- Estate Club (with Eirini Papadopoulou and Babis Stokas) (2017–2018) (with Stelios Rokkos) (2018–2019) (with Stelios Rokkos and Helena Paparizou) (2019–2020)
- Teatro Athens (with Konstantinos Argyros) (2022–2023)
- Cabaret Athens (2024- 2025)
- Pyli Axiou (with Elli Kokinou) (2022), (with Nikos Makropoulos) (2024), (2025), (with Natasa Theodoridou) (2026)
- Enastron (with Melisses and Anastasia) (2023–2024), (with Natasa Theodoridou) (2025–2026), (with Katerina Lioliou) (2026–2027)

== Bibliography ==
- "Afti Einai I Zoi Mou" (2009); An article co-written with Petros Kostopoulos featured in the April 2009 issue of Nitro.
- "Info-diet 370" (2011); An article featured in the November 2011 issue of Athens Voice.

== See also ==
- Honorific nicknames in popular music
- List of Eurovision Song Contest presenters
- List of Greeks
- List of Pepsi spokespersons
- Mononymous person

== Notes ==
Awards and achievements
Eurovision Song Contest
Preceded by Mando with "Never Let You Go"	Greece in the Eurovision Song Contest; 2004	Succeeded by Helena Paparizou with "My Number One"
Preceded by Kalomira with "Secret Combination"	Greece in the Eurovision Song Contest; 2009	Succeeded by Giorgos Alkaios & Friends with "OPA"
Preceded by (Ukraine) Pavlo Shylko & Maria Efrosinina	Eurovision Song Contest presenter (with Maria Menounos); 2006	Succeeded by (Finland) Mikko Leppilampi & Jaana Pelkonen
World Music Awards
Preceded by Haris Alexiou	World's Best-Selling Greek Artist; 2005	Succeeded by N/A
Other
Preceded by N/A	Down Town "Entertainer of the Decade"; 2000s	Succeeded by TBA
Preceded by First award	Greek People's "Sexiest Man Alive"; 2010	Succeeded by TBA
