= List of awards and nominations received by Sakis Rouvas =

Sakis Rouvas awards and nominations
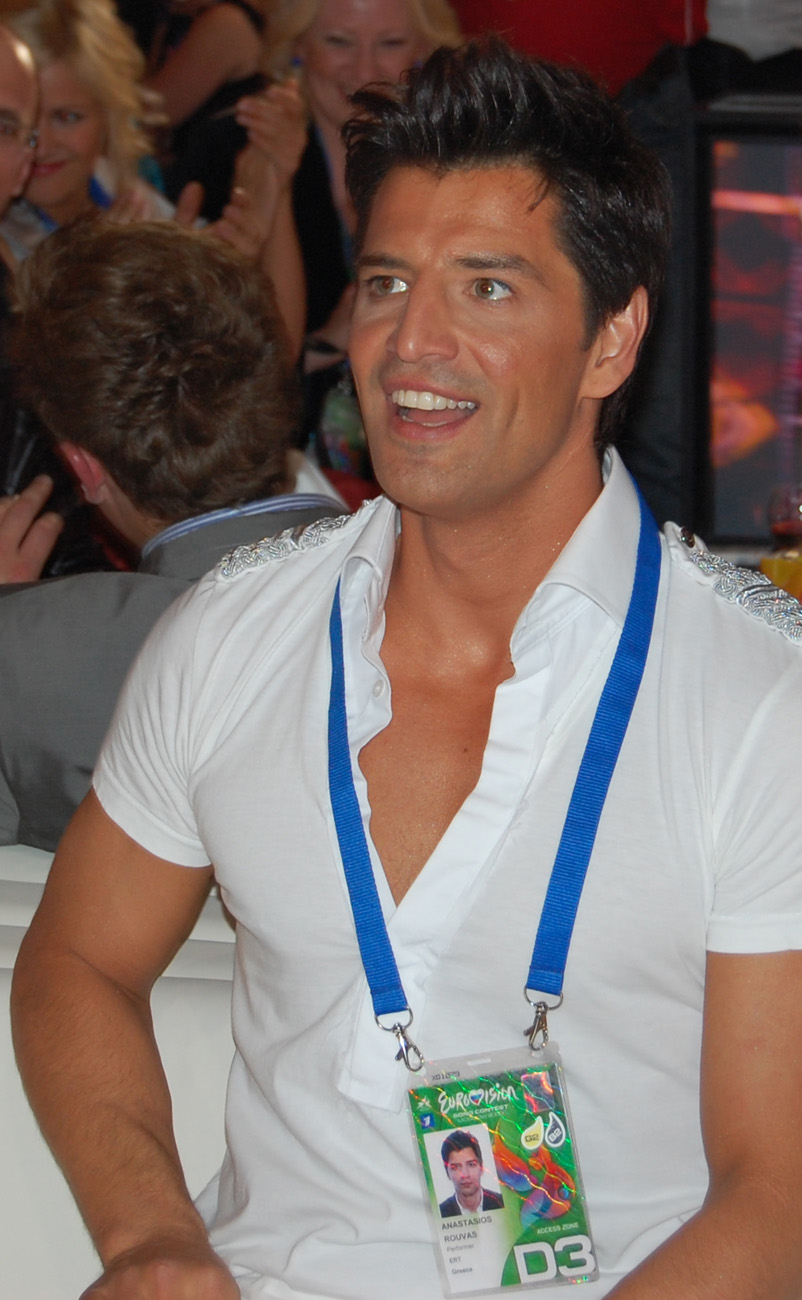
- Rouvas in May 2009
Award	Wins	Nominations
Arion Music Awards	6	25
Balkan Music Awards	1	1
Cyprus Music Awards	0	6
Eurovision Song Contest	0	2	
Johnnie Walker Men of the Year Awards	2	2	
Lalore02 Awards	0	1
MAD TV/Vogue Fashion Icons Award	1	1
MAD Video Music Awards	26	69
OGAE	0	2
MTV Europe Music Awards	1	2
Pop Corn Music Awards	15	20+
Prosopa Awards	1	1+
Status Men of the Year Awards	4	7+
Tashir Armenian Music Awards	1	1
Thessaloniki Song Festival	1	2
United Nations	1	1
World Music Awards	1	1
Theatre Critics Association Awards	1	1
- Totals
Awards won	63
Nominations	130+

This page features a list of awards and nominations received by Greek recording artist and entertainer Sakis Rouvas from the beginning of his career in 1991 to present day. Rouvas has released thirteen studio albums: Sakis Rouvas (1991), Min Andistekese (1992), Gia Sena (1993), Aima, Dakrya & Idrotas (1994), Tora Arhizoun Ta Dyskola (1996), Kati Apo Mena (1998), 21os Akatallilos (2000), Ola Kala (2002), To Hrono Stamatao (2003), S'eho Erotefthi (2005), Iparhi Agapi Edo (2006), Irthes (2008), Parafora (2010) and Sta Kalitera Mou (2021). He has also released two live albums: Live Ballads (2006) and This Is My Live (2007). These album have been released through PolyGram Records Greece (1991–96), Minos EMI (1997–present), and abroad on Universal Music France (2002–2007). All of his albums have been certified gold or higher by the International Federation of the Phonographic Industry of Greece. As of 2008, he has sold an estimated near two million albums, making him one of the best-selling Greek artists in history.

Rouvas is amongst the most awarded Greek entertainers of all time. In addition to his main domain, music, he has also been recognized in sports, television, fashion, and for his humanitarian work. Rouvas began his career as an athlete in 1987 and received awards at a national level. As a performer, he has won 15 Pop Corn Music Awards, six Arion Music Awards, four Status Men of the Year Awards —the most of any musician— and 26 MAD Video Music Awards — more than any other male artist and second overall. He has also received international awards such as a Balkan Music Award, an MTV Europe Music Award, a Tashir Armenian Music Award, and a World Music Award, as well as an Abdi Ipekçi Prize for his efforts in improving Greco-Turkish relations. Rouvas has also represented Greece in the Eurovision Song Contest on two occasions, taking top ten positions both times: third (2004) and seventh (2009). Rouvas has received in excess of 52 awards out of 120 nominations, making him one of the most awarded Greek artists in history. In addition to these recognized awards, Rouvas was also named "Entertainer of the Decade" by Down Town in 2009, while in 2010 Forbes ranked him as the third most powerful and influential Greek celebrity and highest-ranked singer. He was also named Greek People's first "Sexiest Man Alive".

Note that this list includes only recognized awards and not polls and other awards. The list may be incomplete due to the lack of sources on Greek awards prior to the new millennium.

== Arion Music Awards ==
The Arion Music Awards are the official Greek music awards since 2002, and are the successor of the Hellenic Music Pop Corn Awards which were organized by the Greek magazine Pop Star from 1997–2001. The Arions were held for the first five years by Mega Channel and now are held by ANT1. The awards are usually held in April but in 2007 were held in October due to the network change, and thus, no ceremony for the 2008 edition was held. Rouvas has won six awards from 25 nominations.

Year	Nominated work	Award	Result
2001	"Disco Girl"	Best Pop Song	Won
2001	"Disco Girl"	Best Male Pop Singer	Nominated
2001	"Disco Girl"	Song of the Year	Nominated
2003	"Ola Kala"	Best Pop Song	Nominated
2003	Ola Kala	Best Pop Album	Nominated
2003	Ola Kala	Best Male Pop Singer	Nominated
2003	"Ola Kala"	Video of the Year (Xavier Gens/Bullring)	Nominated
2004	"Pes Tis"	Best Pop Song	Nominated
2004	To Hrono Stamatao	Best Pop Album	Nominated
2004	To Hrono Stamatao	Best Male Pop Singer	Won
2004	"Pes Tis"	Video of the Year (Xavier Gens/Bullring)	Nominated
2005	Shake It	Best Pop Song	Nominated
2005	Shake It	Video of the Year	Nominated
2005	Shake It	Male Artist of the Year	Nominated
2005	Shake It	Best-Selling Greek Single of the Year	Won
2006	"S'eho Erotefthi"	Best Pop Song	Nominated
2006	S'eho Erotefthi	Best Pop Album	Won
2006	S'eho Erotefthi	Best Male Pop Singer	Won
2006	"Mila Tis"	Video of the Year (White Room)	Nominated
2006	S'eho Erotefthi	Record of the Year	Nominated
2007	Iparhi Agapi Edo	Best Pop Album	Nominated
2007	"Ola Giro Sou Gyrizoun"	Best Pop Song	Won
2007	Iparhi Agapi Edo	Pop Artist of the Year	Nominated
2007	"Ego Travao Zori"	Video of the Year	Nominated
2007	"Ola Giro Sou Gyrizoun"	Song of the Year	Nominated

== Balkan Music Awards ==
The Balkan Music Awards is an award ceremony organized by Balkanica TV since 2010, celebrating the best in music from Balkan countries. Rouvas has won one award from one nomination.

Year	Nominated work	Award	Result
2010	"Spase To Hrono"	Best Balkan Song from Greece	Won

== Cyprus Music Awards ==
The Cyprus Music Awards are the official Cypriot music awards, held annually by Cyprus College in Nicosia, Cyprus since 2006. Rouvas hasn't managed to win any awards from four official nominations, and six overall (Although the top five highest-selling records are reviewed for the "best-selling" categories, the nomination is not considered official unless won).

Year	Nominated work	Award	Result
2006	S'eho Erotefthi	Male Artist of the Year	Nominated
2006	S'eho Erotefthi	Best-Selling Greek Album of the Year	Nominated
2006	S'eho Erotefthi	Album of the Year	Nominated
2007	Iparhi Agapi Edo	Male Artist of the Year	Nominated
2007	Iparhi Agapi Edo	Best-Selling Greek Album of the Year	Nominated
2007	Iparhi Agapi Edo	Album of the Year	Nominated

== Eurovision Song Contest ==
The Eurovision Song Contest is an annual competition held among active member countries of the EBU. The contest, which has been broadcast every year since its début in 1956, is one of the longest-running television programs and most watched in the world. It is the world's largest music festival, with viewing rates of 100-600 million recorded. In 2004, Rouvas won third place with the song "Shake It", which was tied for the highest placement Greece had ever received in the contest since the 1974 début, up until that year. In 2006, Rouvas would go on to host the contest in Athens along with hostess Maria Menounos. Rouvas will also be Greece's representative in the 2009 contest with the song "This Is Our Night" in May in Moscow, Russia.

Year	Nominated work	Result	Place	Points	Semi	Points
2004	"Shake It"	Nominated	3rd Place	252	3rd Place	238
2009	"This Is Our Night"	Nominated	7th Place	120	4th Place	110

== Johnnie Walker Men of the Year Awards ==
The Johnnie Walker Men of the Year Awards is a Cypriot award ceremony held annually to honour men who have excelled in their field of work.

Year	Award	Result
2010	Presenter of the Year	Won
2011	Greek of the Year	Won

== MAD TV/Vogue Fashion Icons Award ==
The MAD TV/Vogue Fashion Icons Award were a one-time award organized by MAD TV and the Greek edition of Vogue Magazine held in 2003 to recognize the most fashionable Greek television personalities and style icons. Rouvas was one of the only two musicians awarded, the other being Despina Vandi for the title "Best-Dressed Woman in Showbiz".

Year	Nominated work	Award
2003	Awarded for fashion sense	Celebrity with Best Personal Style

== MAD Video Music Awards ==
The MAD Video Music Awards are held annually in June by MAD TV since 2004. In its first two years, the awards were televised on ANT1 for non-satellite viewers, but have since moved to Alpha TV. Rouvas holds a number of records at the MAD Video Music Awards. At the 2010 ceremony, he tied the record for most wins in one night, with four, while his five-time nominee "Spase To Hrono" broke the record for most nominations received by a single video (later tied with "Tora") until he broke his own record in 2012 with "I Dyo Mas", which received six nominations between 2011 and 2012. Since 2009, Rouvas has won the most coveted prize, Artist of the Year, an unprecedented four times. Rouvas has won 26 awards from 69 nominations, making him the male artist with the most wins, and second most-honoured artist overall.

Year	Nominated work	Award	Result
2004	"Pes Tis"	Best Direction	Won
2004	"Pes Tis"	Sexiest Appearance in a Video	Won
2005	"Se Thelo San Trelos" (feat. Philipp Kirkorov)	Best-Dressed Artist in a Video	Nominated
2005	"Shake It"	Sexiest Appearance in a Video	Nominated
2006	"Na M'agapas"	Best Pop Video	Nominated
2006	"Na M'agapas"	Best Video by a Male Artist	Won
2006	"Na M'agapas"	Best Video of the Year	Nominated
2006	"Na M'agapas"	Artist of the Year with Most-Played Video	Nominated
2006	"Na M'agapas"	Best Direction (White Room)	Nominated
2006	"Mila Tis"	Best-Dressed Artist in a Video	Won
2007	"Ego Travao Zori"	Best Pop Video	Nominated
2007	"Ola Gyro Sou Gyrizoun"	Best Dance Video	Won
2007	"Ego Travao Zori"	Best Video by a Male Artist	Nominated
2007	"Ego Travao Zori"	Best Video of the Year	Nominated
2007	"Ego Travao Zori"	Artist of the Year with Most-Played Video	Nominated
2008	"Zise Ti Zoi"	Best Pop Video	Nominated
2008	"Zise Ti Zoi"	Best Male Artist	Won
2008	"Zise Ti Zoi"	Artist of the Year with Most-Played Video	Nominated
2009	"Irthes"	Best Pop Video	Nominated
2009	"This Is Our Night"	Male Artist of the Year	Won
2009	"This Is Our Night"	Artist of the Year	Won
2009	"Irthes"	Best Direction	Nominated
2009	"Irthes"	Fashion Icon of the Year	Nominated
2009	"This Is Our Night"	Best Lyric that Became a Quote	Nominated
2010	"Spase To Hrono"	Best Pop Video	Won
2010	"Spase To Hrono"	Male Artist of the Year	Nominated
2010	"Tharros I Alitheia" (Tamta feat. Sakis Rouvas)	Best Duet or Collaboration Video	Won
2010	"Spase To Hrono"	Artist of the Year	Won
2010	"Spase To Hrono"	Fashion Icon of the Year	Won
2010	"Spase To Hrono"	Sexiest Appearance in a Video	Nominated
2011	"Parafora"	Best Pop Video	Won
2011	"Parafora"	Video of the Year	Won
2011	"I Dyo Mas"	Male Artist of the Year	Nominated
2011	"I Dyo Mas"	Artist of the Year	Won
2011	"Emena Thes" (for "Emena thes")	Best Line	Nominated
2012	"I Dyo Mas"	Best Pop Video	Nominated
2012	"I Dyo Mas"	Video of the Year	Nominated
2012	"I Dyo Mas"	Male Artist of the Year	Won
2012	"I Dyo Mas"	Artist of the Year	Won
2013	"Tora"	Best Pop Video	Nominated
2013	"Tora"	Video of the Year	Won
2013	"Tora"	Male Artist of the Year	Won
2013	"Tora"	Artist of the Year	Nominated
2013	"Tora"	Top 50 Media Inspector Tracks	Nominated
2013	"+ Se Thelo" (MAD VMA 2008)	Best Performance of the Past 10 Years	Nominated
2013	"Pio Dynata" (MAD VMA 2009)	Best Performance of the Past 10 Years	Nominated
2014	"Mia Hara Na Pernas"	Best Male Artist	Won
2014	"Mia Hara Na Pernas"	Artist of the Year	Nominated
2015	"Pio Psila"	Best Pop Video	Nominated
2015	"Pio Psila"	Best Video of the Year	Nominated
2015	"Pio Psila"	Best Male Modern	Won
2015	"Pio Psila"	Artist of the Year	Nominated
2016	"Fila Me"	Best Pop Video	Won
2016	"Fila Me"	Best Male Modern	Won
2016	"Fila Me"	Artist of the Year	Nominated
2017		Best Male Modern	Nominated
2017		Superfans of the Year	Nominated
2018		Best Male Modern	Won
2019		Best Male Modern	Won
2020		Best Male Modern	Nominated
2020	"Etsi Einai I Fasi"	Best Duet (with Helena Paparizou)	Nominated
2021		Best Male Modern	Nominated
2021	"Yperanthropos"	Best Video Clip Ballad	Nominated
2022	"Sta Kalytera Mou"	Best Male Modern	Nominated
2022	"Sta Kalytera Mou"	Best Pop Video Clip	Nominated
2023		MAD Icon Honorary Award	Won
2024	"Thema"	Best Duet (with 3SUM)	Nominated
2024		Best Pop Artist	Nominated
2026	"Kounia Bella"	Video of the Year (with FY)	Nominated

== MTV Europe Music Awards ==
The MTV Europe Music Awards is an awards ceremony organized annually since 1994 by MTV Networks and celebrate the best in European music. The network began a Greek branch in 2007, thus making the country eligible for the ceremony since 2008. Rouvas has won one award, with another nomination.

Year	Award	Result
2010	Best Greek Act	Won
2010	Best European Act	Nominated

== OGAE ==
=== OGAE Song Contest ===
OGAE, is the international fan club of the Eurovision Song Contest. It has branches in 37 European countries. Every year, the organization puts together four non-profit competitions (Song Contest, Second Chance Contest, Video Contest and Homessed Song Contest). The OGAE Song Contest is an audio event in which all OGAE national clubs can enter with an original song released in the previous 12 months in their countries and sung in one of the country's official languages. In honor of his selection to be the Greek 2009 eurovision entrant, Rouvas was chosen by local clubs to be entered in the 23rd OGAE in Zaragosa, Spain on October 25, 2008, where he won third place with 130 points, coming in only behind Croatia and the United Kingdom, respectively.

Year	Nominated work	Result	Place
2006	"Stous 31 Dromous"	Nominated	3rd Place

=== OGAE Video Contest ===
Year	Nominated work	Result	Place
2002	"Ola Kala"	Nominated	Unknown

== Pop Corn Music Awards ==
The Pop Corn Music Awards are a defunct awards ceremony that were the first official Greek music awards show from 1992–2001 and were organized by the Greek magazine Pop Corn. The Arion Music Awards became their successor in 2002. For four consecutive years, Rouvas was said to have "monopolized" the awards ceremony, winning a number of the major awards. Since the introduction of the Best Male Stage Performance category, Rouvas received the award every year. Rouvas has won at least 15 awards from 20 nominations.

Year	Nominated work	Award	Result
1994	Sakis Rouvas	Most Played Artist	Won
1994	"Ksehase To"	Best Video Clip	Nominated
1994	"To Ksero Eisai Moni"	Best Lyric	Nominated
1995	Sakis Rouvas	Best New Artist	Won
1995	"Ksana"	Song of the Year	Won
1995	Sakis Rouvas	Best Live Performance	Won
1995	Sakis Rouvas	Most Likable Artist	Nominated
1995	Sakis Rouvas	Best Male Artist	Nominated
1995	"Ela Mou"	Best Video Clip	Nominated
1995	Aima, Dakrya & Idrotas	Album of the Year	Nominated
1995	Aima, Dakrya & Idrotas	Best Vocal Abilities	Nominated
1996	"Tora Arhizoun Ta Dyskola"	Song of the Year	Won
1996	Sakis Rouvas	Best Live Performance	Won
1996	Sakis Rouvas	Best Male Artist	Nominated
1996	Tora Arhizoun Ta Dyskola	Album of the Year	Nominated
1996	"Min Magapiseis"	Best Composition	Nominated
1997	Sakis Rouvas	Best Stage Performance	Nominated
1997	"Se Thelo, Me Thelis"	Best Laiko Dance Song	Nominated
1998	Theleis I Den Theleis	Best Video Clip	Won
1998	Theleis I Den Theleis	Best Male Stage Performance	Won
1999	Sakis Rouvas	Best Male Singer	Nominated
1999	"Den Ehei Sidera I Kardia Sou"	Best Song	Won
1999	"Den Ehei Sidera I Kardia Sou"	Best Video Clip	Won
1999	"Den Ehei Sidera I Kardia Sou"	Best Lyrics	Nominated
1999	"Den Ehei Sidera I Kardia Sou"	Best Composition	Won
1999	"Den Ehei Sidera I Kardia Sou"	Best Male Stage Performance	Won
1999	"Den Ehei Sidera I Kardia Sou"	Best Male Vocal Performance	Won
1999	Kati Apo Mena	Best Album Cover	Nominated
1999	Kati Apo Mena	Best Album	Nominated
1999	"Oso Eho Esena"	Best Duet/Collaboration	Nominated
2000	"Kanoume Oneira"	Best Male Stage Performance	Won
2000	"Se Thelo San Trelos"	Best Male Vocal Performance	Won
2000	"Se Thelo San Trelos"	Best Video Clip	Nominated
2001	"Antexa"	Best Video Clip	Nominated
2001	"Antexa"	Best Male Stage Performance	Won

== Prosopa Awards ==
The Prosopa Awards are an annual awards ceremony honoring Greek excellence in television and media, televised on Mega Channel since 2003. Rouvas has won one award.

Year	Nominated work	Award	Result
2006	S'eho Erotefthi	Singer of the Year	Won

== Status Men of the Year Awards ==
The Status Awards are held annually since 1996 by the Greek edition of the men's magazine Status, usually every March and are televised by Star Channel. The magazine nominates men for excellence within their fields, which are then voted on by the magazine's readers. Rouvas has won four awards and is tied for the musician with the most awards.

Year	Award	Result
1999	Man of the Year	Won
2004	Singer of the Year	Won
2005	Singer of the Year	Nominated
2006	Singer of the Year	Nominated
2008	Singer of the Year	Nominated
2009	Singer of the Year	Won
2010	Singer of the Year	Won

== Tashir Armenian Music Awards ==
The Tashir Armenian Music Awards are an annual awards ceremony to celebrate the best in the music of the Armenian diaspora. Rouvas was given an honorary award as one of six favourite representatives of the Armenian public to win the Eurovision Song Contest 2009

Year	Award	Result
2009	Award of Hope	Won

== Thessaloniki Song Festival ==
The Thessaloniki Song Festival is an annual competition held in Thessaloniki since 1962. It is the longest-running music festival and award ceremony in Greece. There are a number of titles awarded, with the ultimate winner being the recipient of the Best Composition award, which made Rouvas the winner of the 30th annual contest with his début single composed by Nikos Terzis, with lyrics by Giorgos Pavrianos. Following his loss of the "Best Vocals" award, which he lost to another newcoming artist, Giorgos Alkaios, by only one point, many reporters claimed that the contest was rigged.

Year	Nominated work	Award	Result	Place
1991	"Par'ta"	Best Vocals	Nominated	2nd Place
1991	"Par'ta"	Best Composition	Won	1st Place

== Honorary awarding by United Nations ==
The Turkish sector of the United Nations that deal with peace-keeping awarded Rouvas with the International Abdi Ipekçi Prize after his concert with Burak Kut on neutral territory on the Green Line in Cyprus that caused political turmoil and became a leading international news story. Greek politicians Konstantinos Mitsotakis and George Papandreou also received the same honor that year.

Year	Nominated work	Award
1997	Awarded for co-operation and understanding in producing a "bi-national" concert for peace and reconciliation efforts between Greco-Turkish relations with the Turkish artist Burak Kut in order to obtain racial and cultural equivalence.	International Abdi Ipekçi Prize

== World Music Awards ==
The World Music Awards are an annual international awards ceremony since 1989 that honors recording artists from all over the world based on sales figures provided by the International Federation of the Phonographic Industry (IFPI). The awards show is conducted under the patronage of H.S.H. Prince Albert of Monaco, Monte-Carlo.

The show is broadcast to North and South America, all of Europe, the Middle East, Japan and South East Asia, all of China, some other parts of Asia, Australia, New Zealand, and all of Africa, reaching an estimated worldwide audience of around one billion viewers, in over 160 countries.

The regional awards, as many of the other awards, are not awarded standard annually, but when it is believed that the artist has sold a notable number of records in his or her respective category or genre. Rouvas was only the third Greek artist living and working in Greece to ever receive the award in its history, being awarded after Despina Vandi and Haris Alexiou respectively. He became the first and to date only male working in Greece to receive this award, as well as the most recent recipient.

Year	Nominated work	Award
2005	World's Best-Selling Greek Artist of 2004	Won
2014	World's Best Male Artist	Nominated
2014	World's Best Entertainer of the Year	Nominated
2014	Greek Legend (Honorary award)	Won

== Greek Theatre Critics Association Awards ==
Year	Nominated work	Award	Result
2014	The Bacchae	Best Performance In The Category Of Ancient Drama	Won

== Sarajevo Film Festival ==
Year	Nominated work	Award	Result
2015	Chevalier	Heart of Sarajevo Award for Best Actor (Ensemble cast)	Won

== Honorary titles and recognition ==
- Rouvas was one of the youngest artists to release a full-length studio album in Greece.
- Rouvas was one of the youngest artists to ever have an album achieve gold certification or to go to number 1 on the Greek Albums Chart.
- Rouvas has the largest Greek fanclub, the SRFC (Sakis Rouvas Fanclub) since its start in 1996.
- In 1998, after winning the award at the Hellenic Music Awards, Rouvas was named "Greece's Best Stage Performer".
- In 2004, Rouvas was the highest-paid entertainer in the Greek entertainment industry and was named Greece's most successful contemporary male artist.
- Since 2008, Rouvas has been recognized as one of Greece's best-selling artists in history with sales of over two million albums.
