= Parafora (song) =

Single by Sakis Rouvas

from the album Parafora
- Released: 15 October 2010
- Recorded: 2010
- Genre: Electropop, ambient, dance-pop
- Length: 4:04
- Label: EMI/Minos
- Songwriters: Dimitris Kontopoulos, Nikos Kostidakis (aka Moraitis)
- Producers: Dimitris Kontopoulos, Sakis Rouvas (exec.)

Sakis Rouvas singles chronology
"Emena Thes" (2010)	"Parafora" (2010)	"I Dio Mas" (2011)

"Parafora" (Greek: "Παράφορα"; English: Madly) is the third single by Greek pop/rock musician Sakis Rouvas from his thirteenth studio album of the same name. It is an electropop-ambient-dance-pop song written by Dimitris Kontopoulos and Nikos Kostidakis and produced by Kontopoulos. The song was released to radio stations on 15 October 2010 to coincide with the premiere date of Rouvas 2010–11 winter season shows with Anna Vissi called Face2Face. It is performed as the second song of the setlist at the aforementioned concert series.

== Background ==
"Parafora" was written and produced by Dimitris Kontopoulos, who has collaborated with Rouvas on several occasions since To Hrono Stamatao (2003), including having fully produced his Irthes (2008) album and creating the electronic hits "Ola Gyro Sou Gyrizoun", "Stous 31 Dromous", "+ Se Thelo", "This Is Our Night", and most recently "Spase To Hrono", while the lyrics were written by Nikos Kostidakis, who has never before collaborated with Rouvas.

The song first appeared through Rouvas' official Facebook account and on Happy Radio 93.2 on 15 October 2010, released in conjunction with the premiere date of his 2010–11 winter season shows, Face2Face, with Anna Vissi. It is the third single from Rouvas' thirteenth studio album Parafora released in mid-December 2010, following the number-one hit "Spase To Hrono" and the top-five hit "Emena Thes". The song was released as a digital download on 12 November 2010.

== Composition and theme ==
"Parafora" is an electropop-ambient-dance-pop song. It begins with a 45-second-long introduction and proceeds into the traditional verse-chorus format. Instrumental breaks proceed the chorus, while the song ends with digitizations of Rouvas' voice. Lyrically, the song finds Rouvas expressing loving someone "madly"; the chorus is a series of questions pertaining to how he can carry on without the person, coming to the conclusion that it would have been better had he not known them.

== Chart performance ==
"Parafora" had reached the top ten of the Nielsen Music Control Airplay chart prior to the release of its music video and peaked at number one on the domestic edition of the chart for three consecutive weeks. and number two on the mixed airplay chart. It placed as the 65th most played song by a Greek artist of 2010 in the Nielsen Music Control year-end airplay chart.

== Critical reception ==
Pavlos Zervas of Music Corner listed the song as one of the 20 best songs of 2010 in the Greek dance category, saying "The song by Sakis that we loved...madly the preceding year. The music by Dimitris Kontopoulos compells you to its danceable rhythm, the lyrics by Nikos Kostidakis manage to grab our attention and of course Sakis Rouvas delivers the song with absolute competence."

== Music video ==
The official music video for "Parafora" was exclusively released by Love Radio on their website on 25 November 2010. The video is directed by White Room.

== Live performances ==
The first live performance of the song was made at the premiere of the artist's Face2Face shows on 15 October at Athens Arena during his solo setlist. Following the opening number, a fully choreographed military-themed performance of "Spase To Hrono", the song is performed immediately after.

== Controversy ==
Shortly after the release of the song, a controversy erupted regarding the lyricist of the song. Love Radio posted a news article claiming the lyricist of the song is actually Nikos Moraitis. In the article, Love Radio claims Moraitis used his mother's maiden name of "Kostidakis" as he currently has an exclusive agreement to only write lyrics for Michalis Hatzigiannis for his upcoming album. Following the posting of the article, Moraitis responded to Love Radio claiming that Dimitris Kontopoulos did not get permission from him to give the song to Rouvas. He claimed that the song was written with Kontopoulos during their collaboration writing for different artists, while he also denied the claim that he has an exclusive agreement with Hatzigiannis, or that Hatzigiannis does not allow him to write for other artists. He further went on to state that he has not worked with Rouvas to date for purely artistic reasons. The song is subsequently credited under the name Moraitis instead on the release of the album Parafora.

== Personnel ==
- Sakis Rouvas – vocals, executive producer
- Dimitris Kontopoulos – songwriter, producer
- Nikos Kostidakis (aka Moraitis) – songwriter

== Charts ==
=== Weekly charts ===
Chart	Peak position
Nielsen Music Control Greek Airplay Chart	2
Nielsen Music Control Greek Domestic Airplay Chart	1

=== Year-end charts ===
Chart (2011)	Position
Greek Airplay Chart	44

== Release history ==
Region	Date	Label	Format
Greece	15 October 2010	Minos EMI	Radio single, promo single
Greece	12 November 2010	Minos EMI	Digital download
Cyprus	15 October 2010	Minos EMI	Radio single
