= Parafora =

Parafora Παράφορα

Studio album by Sakis
- Released: 14 December 2010
- Recorded: October 2009–16 November 2010; Vox Recording Studios, Studio Workshop, Studio Odeon, and Studio C&C, Athens, Greece
- Genres: Pop, rock, electronic, R&B, dance
- Length: 51:08
- Language: Greek
- Label: EMI/Minos
- Producers: Playmen, Beetkraft, Leonidas "Freakchild" Chantzaras, Thodoros Darmas, Nektarios Kokkinos (co-exec), Dimitris Kontopoulos, Alex Leon, Sakis Rouvas (exec.), Soumka

Sakis chronology
Irthes (2008)	Parafora; Παράφορα (2010)	Sta Kalitera Mou (2021)

Singles from Parafora
- 1. "Spase To Hrono" Released: 20 November 2009; 2. "Emena Thes" Released: 4 May 2010; 3. "Parafora" Released: 15 October 2010; 4. "I Dio Mas" Released: 11 April 2011; 5. "Nekros Okeanos" Released: 2011

Parafora (Greek: Παράφορα, pronounced [paˈrafora]; English: Madly) is the 13th studio album by Greek recording artist Sakis Rouvas and 15th album overall. It was released by Minos EMI in Greece and Cyprus on 14 December 2010 and distributed digitally ten days later to all Eurozone countries and elsewhere. Along with the standard retail edition, a special edition was also sold, which included a bonus pictorial fan magazine with lyrics.

Recording dates for the album lasted over one year and concluding in November 2010. Rouvas collaborated with several songwriters and producers, including previous collaborators Dimitris Kontopoulos and Natalia Germanou and the rest mostly new collaborators, including recent hit makers Freakchild, Playmen, and Beetkraft. Rouvas continues to serve as executive producer and financier, a role he had adopted since 2006. The release offers new sounds and themes for Rouvas, while still focusing on his established pop, rock, and electronic genres. There are a total of 15 tracks as well as four music videos of the first three singles all on an Enhanced CD. The album was inspired by Rouvas' upcoming 20th anniversary as an entertainer in 2011; he drew inspiration from his experiences, the relationship with his fans, and the music and messages he had created during the past two decades and combined all of these elements into one album, which he described as the best of his career. The album represents the turn Rouvas is taking in the next phase of his career.

Trident resumed its role as album sponsor and in promotion held a contest, the largest ever of its kind in Greece. Samples of the songs were uploaded by Rouvas leading up to the release, causing unprecedented traffic on the internet for such uploads by a Greek artist. The initial reaction from the mass consumer audience and professional music critics was largely favourable. Rouvas supported the album through his winter 2009–2010 resident show The S Club, a spring 2010 summer resident show at Politia Live Clubbing and a simultaneous national tour, as well as his 2010–11 resident show Face2Face. He later embarked at The S Club at Thalassa in 2011 and Underworld S Club at Athens Arena in 2011–2012. Parafora debuted at number two on the Greek IFPI Top 75 Albums and topped the chart for two consecutive weeks. It has so far spent ten non-consecutive weeks in the top ten. After one week of sales it was announced by Rouvas himself that the album's initial shipments were enough to warrant a double platinum certification. The album sold thousands of digital copies and became the most successful albums of the year. It is awaiting a multi-platinum certification on 7 December 2011. Prior to its release, the album had already generated three chart-topping singles: "Spase To Hrono", "Emena Thes", and the title track, while "I Dio Mas" followed and "Nekros Okeanos" was confirmed as a future single. "Kalokairi Kai Fos" was also released as a promotional single while "Gia Mas" also charted. The album and its singles have earned Rouvas several awards. The first single was nominated for a record-breaking five MAD Video Music Awards, winning three—including Artist of the Year—and a Balkan Music Award. Rouvas also won an MTV Europe Music Award and two Status Men of the Year Awards, while he won three MAD Video Music Awards in 2011, including the two most coveted prizes, Video of the Year and Artist of the Year for "Parafora" and "I Dio Mas", respectively.

== Conception and development ==
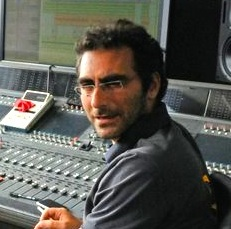
Dimitris Kontopoulos, who solely produced Rouvas' previous album, once again collaborated with the artist as one of the album's writers and producers.

Parafora is Rouvas' 13th studio album and first since Irthes (2008). Intentions to release the album became apparent after a contest held by one of his sponsors, Trident. Recording for the album began in the fourth quarter of 2009 with "Spase To Hrono" and spanned over one year. The last track was recorded on 15 November 2010 and the album recording was finished in its entirety one day later; Rouvas revealed his excitement via Twitter, stating that "I just finished recording the best album of my career!" The album's title and cover were revealed on 10 December 2010.

For his previous album, Irthes, Rouvas collaborated almost exclusively with Dimitris Kontopoulos, who was also commissioned to write all three of Rouvas' candidate songs for his participation in the Eurovision Song Contest 2009, as well as the composer and producer of his album, with the exception of one track. Working namely with one main composer is something that Rouvas had not done since Kati Apo Mena (1998) and not completely exclusively since Tora Arhizoun Ta Dyskola (1996). For Parafora, Rouvas reverted to using several songwriters and producers. The majority of the songwriters and producers are new collaborators and recent hit makers relatively new to the music industry. Kontopoulos, who first collaborated with Rouvas for To Hrono Stamatao (2003), resumed his role as a composer, producer, arranger, programmer, and instrumentalist, with eight contributions to the album, including the singles "Spase To Hrono" and the title track. Others who have never previously collaborated with Rouvas include Playmen, Beetkraft, Antonis Skokos, Greek-German Leonidas "Freakchild" Chantzaras, who composed "Nekros Okeanos" and produced "Emena Thes", and Dimitris Fakos who wrote both its music and lyrics. Songwriters who exclusively contributed lyrics to the album include Natalia Germanou, who first collaborated with Rouvas on Min Andistekese (1992), Pigi Konstantinou and Giannis Rentoumis who first collaborated with the artist on Irthes, and new collaborators Sunny Baltzi, Vagia Kalantzi, and Nikos Kostidakis, who wrote "Parafora".

"The album that you hold in your hands means a lot to me: emotions, experiences, different paths, creative meetings with old and new collaborators. After a 20 year journey, I feel that it is the step towards the next phase. During that time, we lived and evolved together... Records that were loved, songs that defined me [and] us, the love that was created between us —and continuously grows— and our communication that becomes all the more immediate and strong, makes me feel every day lucky and blessed. The positive energy we exchange, the power of music and words about the big and the small, united and became a whole album that I am proud of. I cannot wait to share it with you, to sing it together and for you to enjoy it as much as I do. In the new phase of the next 20 years that informally begins, I am certain that we will live and will share a lot, even more intensely"
—Rouvas on the inspiration for the album and what it represents in his career. (translated)

Shortly after the release of the title track a controversy arose between its songwriters following an article published by Love Radio revealing that Kostidakis was actually lyricist Nikos Moraïtis under the alias of his mother's maiden name. Love Radio alleged that Moraïtis, best known for his collaboration with Cypriot artist Michalis Hatzigiannis, was forced to use the alias as he was intent on being part of Rouvas' new album project but could not as he had made a deal with Hatzigiannis not to write for any other artist until after the release of his album, To Kalitero Psema, which was slated for release around the same time as Rouvas' album. Moraïtis responded to Love Radio, revealing that he was in fact Kostidakis, but denying that he had a secret deal with Hatzigiannis or that he wanted to collaborate with Rouvas and stated that he had never done so due to artistic differences. He further alleged that Kontopoulos had not received permission from him to give it to Rouvas. However, in the album's liner notes, he is not credited under his alias but rather under his actual name. Sakis Rouvas Music continues to have creative and financial control over the production, a role which it has assumed since Iparhi Agapi Edo (2006).

Rouvas revealed that the album was created with his upcoming 20th anniversary in September 2011 in thought. The content was inspired by his relationship with his fans, experiences, and music and ideas he had created the past two decades, all merging into one album. Furthermore, the album represents a turn in his career into the next phase.

== Composition and themes ==
Describing the album in a press release prior to its physical release, record label Minos EMI stated thatParafora offers new innovations in sound as well as "inspired lyrics". It includes a blend of pop, rock, dance, and electronic genres. "Spase To Hrono", "Parafora", "I Dio Mas", "An Pote", "Gia Mas", "Agapise Me", "Kalokairi Kai Fos", "To Allo Sou Miso", and "Proti Nihta" are electronic songs, while "Emena Thes" is a romantic hard rock power ballad where Rouvas professes his love to a woman who denies being in love with him. "Nekros Okeanos" is also a rock ballad, while "Tipikes Epafes" and "I Akri Tis Klostis" are R&B ballads. "Gela" and "S'agapo Kai Fevgo" pop/rock songs, the latter being one of the few mid-tempos on the album.

== Artwork ==
The cover of the album was revealed on 10 December 2010. It features Rouvas wearing a white T-shirt against a white background with different colour paints splattered over himself, as well as the new "Sakis" logo displayed below. There was also a photo shoot for the creation of a fan magazine which will include the lyrics of the songs. He is dressed in apparel from his eponymous ready-to-wear clothing line, Sakis Rouvas Collection.

== Singles ==
Even before the album's physical release the singles proved highly successful, with two singles out of three topping the domestic airplay chart. The first single of the album, "Spase To Hrono" became Rouvas' fourth consecutive single to top all Greek charts, including the Billboard digital sales and both the domestic and mixed airplay charts. It was released more than one year prior to the album's release, on 20 November 2009 and its video is directed by Vasilis Bourandas. "Emena Thes" was released on 4 May 2010. It reached number 12 in the mixed airplay chart and its music video was directed by White Room, featuring an innovative animation effect that had never before been used in Greek cinematography. The third single and title track was released in October 2010, making it the most singles released by Rouvas from an album prior to its actual release. It peaked at number one on the domestic airplay chart for six weeks The album's fourth single is "Oi dio mas" that peaked at number one of the domestic airplay chart being the sixth single of Sakis Rouvas doing so. Additionally, was the number one song on the 2011 year-end Media Inspector airplay chart. In Nielsen Music Control's year-end top 100 Greek airplay songs, Rouvas ended 2010 with "Spase To Hrono" at number five with 15,055 transmissions even though the song was released in 2009 while "Parafora" placed 65th.

== Release and promotion ==
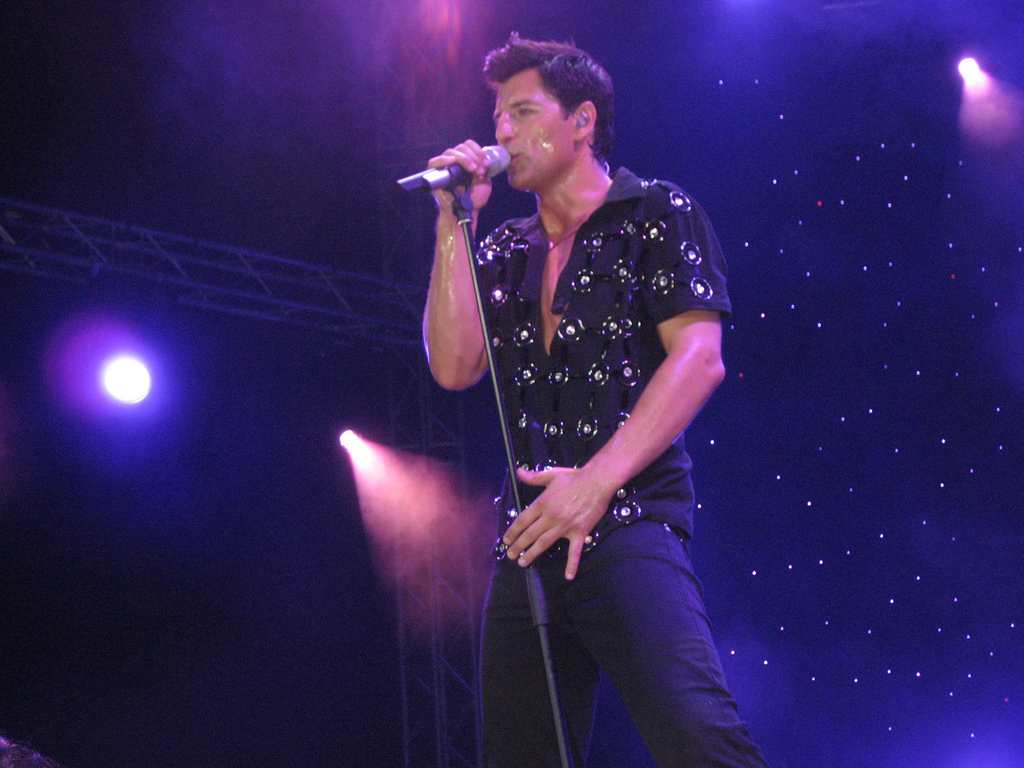
Rouvas described the album as the greatest of his career.

In 2009, "Spase To Hrono" and "Pio Dinata" a Greek-language remix of his 2009 Eurovision Song Contest entry "This Is Our Night" along with tracks from the reissue of the same name of Irthes, were released physically as an extended play titled Spase To Hrono. In addition to this, Rouvas appeared on several shows and radio stations in promotion of the album and singles. He performed "Emena Thes" at the 2010 MAD Video Music Awards. He performed the songs "Spase To Hrono", "+ Se Thelo", and "This Is Our Night" at the Mykonos Xlsior Festival for gay pride on 27 August and was also scheduled to perform at the first Εurovoice on 23 September, as one of four celebrities along with performers Enrique Iglesias, Anastacia, and host Pamela Anderson, although his appearance was later canceled one day prior to the event due to undisclosed issues. On The X Factor, where Rouvas has been the presenter since the first season in 2008, he performed "Spase To Hrono" in the second season and later performed "Parafora" in the third season première. Additionally, that episode was partially Rouvas themed, with several contestants performing his hits, while "Emena Thes" was performed by another contestant on a later date. On the 11 December episode, Parafora was exhibited and discussed. On 2 February, Rouvas was one of eight main acts participating in the first MADWalk, an equivalent to the international Fashion Rocks, where he represented Celia Kritharioti Haute Couture and performed "I Dio Mas" and "Gia Mas". Models Vicky Kaya and Doukissa Nomikou were also featured in his performance. On The X Factor semi-final on 4 February 2011, Rouvas performed the songs "Nekros Okeanos", "I Dio Mas", and "Gia Mas" and a special tribute video of his best X Factor moments was played. Rouvas was the first guest ever on Vrady Me Ton Petro Kostopoulo in October 2010. He additionally did a radio interview with Rythmos 94,9 who promoted the release of "Spase To Hrono". The release of "Parafora" and the album preview were conducted by Love Radio 97,5. As he had also done in 2009, in collaboration with Love Radio Rouvas presented Sakis Live in Love on the eve of Valentine's Day at Athens Arena. Rouvas performed a medley of the dance hits from the album as well as + Se Thelo at the 2011 MAD Video Music Awards in a Mission Impossible-style theme where he ascended from the ceiling onto the secondary stage with a wire, with his arms covered in henna tattoos and a dance troop dressed as aliens on the main stage where he eventually joined. His performance was the most acclaimed of the night. He was also featured on the cover of the magazines Status, 7Meres TV, Cosmopolitan, Down Town, Esquire, It's Me Super, Marie Claire, Life Style, Tiletheatis, X Magazine, People, and Nitro and also gave interviews to Sunday Ethnos and Glow.

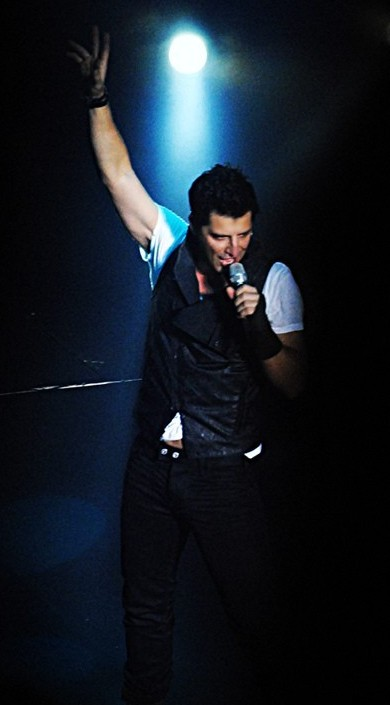
Rouvas performing on 1 January 2011 at Athens Arena during the Face2Face shows, where he performs Parafora tracks as part of his set list.

Rouvas also promoted the album through his account on the social networking sites Twitter and Facebook, where he began trending the album. From 10 December 2010, Rouvas began posting roughly 30-second teasers of the tracks up until the album's release. He had announced a "surprise" for his fans at 20:00h, beginning with "I Dio Mas" and "Nekros Okeanos". The following day he did the same with "Tipikes Epafes" and "Gela", then "I Akri Tis Klostis" and "Kalokairi Kai Fos" the day after that, concluding with "Agapise Me" and "To Allo Sou Miso" on the eve of the album's release. He placed the remaining four tracks, "Gia Mas", "S'agapao Kai Fevgo", "An Pote" and "Proti Nihta" online as well in the following two days. There was a high demand for Rouvas' song samples, causing "mayhem" on the internet. On 11 December the official television advertisement for the album was released.

Trident continued to sponsor Rouvas' works. In March 2010 Trident held a contest, the largest ever of its kind, called "Spase to hrono me ton Saki Rouva kai Trident" (Shatter time with Sakis Rouvas and Trident) in promotion of the first single as well as Trident Senses. The ultimate winner would get the opportunity to spend 48 hours with Rouvas, ten would get to be featured in his upcoming music video for "Emena Thes", and a further 100 would receive his new studio album prior to its release date. The album was released on 14 December 2010 in both retail stores and newsstand kiosks. A special edition including a pictorial fan magazine with a new photo shoot and the song lyrics is distributed by print publisher Ekdoseis Liberi via newspaper kiosks. Like other merchandise distributed by print publishers, it carries a fixed price of 12.90 euros. The album was released digitally on 24 December 2010 on all iTunes in the Eurozone as well as Australia and New Zealand. It is awaiting release in the United States and Canada under this manner as well, where his previous album was also released. In 2010, Rouvas also signed a distribution deal with Bulgaria's Virginia Records, and the album is awaiting a physical release there.

=== Tours ===
Rouvas performed as the main act at the concert-themed stage The S Club, where he had ownership, from December 2009 – April 2010 with supporting acts Tamta, Eleftheria Eleftheriou of the second season of the Greek The X Factor, American rapper Gifted, and the group Cabin 54. The show, without Eleftheriou and Gifted, moved to Thessaloniki at Politia for a six-week engagement. During that time Rouvas also visited ten cities on his mid-2010 tour. Having confirmed their collaboration in March 2010, Rouvas collaborated with Anna Vissi for the Face2Face shows from October 2010 into the first quarter of 2011 on Fridays and Saturdays at Athens Arena. On 17 December 2010, the album's material was added to the set list in the revamped leg of the shows.

== Reception ==
=== Initial reaction ===
The demand for Rouvas' song samples before the release of the album was grand, causing "mayhem" on the internet. They attracted thousands of listeners and fans who left comments, something that was unprecedented for this type of upload according to Yupi. The album received favourable reactions from the internet audience who generally agreed with Rouvas' previous statement of it being the best album of his career.

MAD TV conducted a poll for its readers about who had the best album out of Rouvas, Michalis Hatzigiannis, and Anna Vissi; Rouvas won the poll with 36 per cent of the vote, with the other two artists attaining 31 per cent each.

=== Commercial performance ===
During the 2008 financial crisis, it became common practice for Greek artists to release new studio albums prior to their retail release as covermounts in Sunday edition newspapers or magazines to increase exposure for both themselves and the print release. Although these editions are sold for a slightly increased amount than the daily price, they are still fairly lower than the retail cost of a standard album. According to To Paron, newspapers began bidding for Rouvas' new album even prior to the release of the first single in 2009 and his album garnered more attention than that of any other artist by marketers. Based on this anticipation, the newspaper estimated that bids would exceed the previously speculated highest amount of 150 thousand euros per 250 thousand unit distributions offered to high-profile artists such as Michalis Hatzigiannis, who was offered such for a previously released studio album. Despite high interest, Rouvas remains one of the few artists who have decided against releasing an album in this manner, as he instead opted for a direct retail release.

Two other high-profile artists, Michalis Hatzigiannis and Anna Vissi, released their albums, To Kalitero Psema and Agapi Einai Esi, within days prior and following Parafora, respectively. This triggered a sense of direct competition among the media, curious to which artist would ultimately have the best album. On 17 December 2010, Rouvas thanked his fans via Twitter for the support they showed for his album and promised another surprise for Monday. On Tuesday, 21 December, he reminded his fans about what he had promised, and later announced that Parafora had gone double platinum within one week of sales, denoting shipments of at least 24 thousand units, although the International Federation of the Phonographic Industry of Greece has yet to announce this. Parafora debuted during week 50 of the IFPI Top 75 Albums chart at number two, coming behind Hatzigiannis' To Kalitero Psema. It remained there for a second week and on its third week it reached number one, trading places with Hatzigiannis' album, where it remained for two consecutive weeks. By its fifth week, the album dropped to No. 2, being surpassed by the soundtrack of Patty, I Pio Omorfi Istoria before descending to number three then nine before suddenly disappearing from the chart in its eighth week, although it re-entered the chart at number three during its ninth week, giving it its eighth non-consecutive week in the top ten and seventh within the top three.

The album showed a strong performance on the records charts and also sold thousands of digital copies via iTunes, leading to "record-breaking sales" that "have rocketed it to the top of the most successful albums of the year", according to ANT1. The album will be certified multi-platinum (number of discs has not yet been announced) on 7 December 2011 at eight o'clock at the Athens Metro Mall open for fan attendance.

=== Accolades ===
Pavlos Zervas of Music Corner listed the song "S'agapao Kai Fevgo" as one of the 20 best songs of 2010 in the Mainstream Greek Pop category, despite it not having been released as a single., while he listed "Parafora" as one of the top 20 in the Greek dance category, and Chrysa Kosmidou listed "Emena Thes" as one of the 20 best Greek ballads.

The music video of "Spase To Hrono" received five nominations at the 2010 MAD Video Music Awards – more than any other video in history, including Best Pop Video, Fashion Icon of the Year, Sexiest Video and also contributed to his nominations for Male Artist of the Year and Artist of the Year. It won three in the pop, fashion, and Artist of the Year categories, while he also won an award for his collaboration with Tamta for a total of four awards and equaled the most awards ever won by an artist in one night. The song also won Best Balkan Song from Greece and contributed to his win as Best Greek Act at the MTV Europe Music Awards 2010 where he was then shortlisted in the category Best European Act. For the second consecutive year, Rouvas received the Singer of the Year title at the 15th Status Men of the Year Awards, making him tied as the most honoured musician in the award's history. He won three awards, again the most of any artist that night, at the 2011 MAD Video Music Awards, including Best Pop Video and Video of the Year for "Parafora" and for the third consecutive year, the most coveted prize, Artist of the Year for "I Dio Mas", becoming the artist with the most honours in that category.

== Track listing ==
No.	Title	Writer(s)	Producer(s)	Length
1.	"Spase To Hrono" (Σπάσε το Xρόνο; Shatter time)	Dimitris Kontopoulos, Pigi Konstantinou	Kontopoulos	3:28
2.	"Parafora" (Παράφορα; Madly)	Kontopoulos, Nikos Kostidakis	Kontopoulos	4:02
3.	"Oi Dio Mas" (Οι Δυό Μας; The two of us)	Kontopoulos, Giannis Rentoumis	Kontopoulos	3:12
4.	"Nekros Oceanos" (Νεκρός Ωκεανός; Dead ocean)	Leonidas "Freakchild" Chantzaras, Sebastian Thott, Didrik Thott, Sunny Baltzi	Theodoros Darmas	3:34
5.	"An Pote" (Αν Ποτέ; If ever)	Kontopoulos, Vagia Kalantzi	Kontopoulos	3:56
6.	"Gia Mas" (Για Μας; For us)	Playmen, Dimitris Fakos	Playmen, Alex Leon	3:38
7.	"Agapise Me" (Αγάπησέ Με; Love me)	Kontopoulos, Kalantzi	Kontopoulos	3:27
8.	"Typices Epafes" (Τυπικές Επαφές; Typical contacts)	Freakchild, Christian C. Weber, Fabrizio Levita, Tony Cornelissen, Baltzi	Soumka, Freakchild*	3:14
9.	"Kalokairi Kai Fos" (Καλοκαίρι Και Φως; Summer and light)	Kontopoulos, Rentoumis	Kontopoulos	3:14
10.	"I Akri Tis Klostis" (Η Άκρη της Κλωστής; The tip of the thread)	Freakchild, Hulden, Fakos	Soumka, Freakchild*	2:55
11.	"To Allo Sou Miso" (Το Άλλο Σου Μισό; Your other half)	Beetkraft, Antonis Skokos, Stratos Antipariotis	Beetkraft	3:15
12.	"Emena Thes" (Εμένα Θες; I am the one you want)	Fakos	Freakchild	3:01
13.	"Gela" (Γέλα; Laugh)	Kontopoulos, Kalantzi	Kontopoulos	2:59
14.	"Proti Nychta" (Πρώτη Νύχτα; First night)	Kontopoulos, Natalia Germanou	Kontopoulos	3:30
15.	"S'agapo Kai Fevgo" (Σ'αγαπώ Και Φεύγω; I love you and I'm leaving)	Freakchild, Fakos	Darmas	3:40
Total length:				51:08

Bonus videos
No.	Title	Director	Length
1.	"Spase To Hrono"	Vasilis Bourantas	3:28
2.	"Emena Thes"	White Room	3:01
3.	"Parafora"	White Room	4:02
4.	"Emena Thes (MAD Version)" (Bonus)	Kostas Kapetanidis	3:01

(*) Co-producer

== Awards ==
Balkan Music Awards

- Best Balkan Song from Greece ("Spase To Hrono")

MAD Video Music Awards

- Best Pop Video ("Spase To Hrono")
- Male Artist of the Year ("Spase To Hrono" — Nominated)
- Artist of the Year ("Spase To Hrono")
- Fashion Icon of the Year ("Spase To Hrono")
- Sexiest Video ("Spase To Hrono" — Nominated)
- Best Pop Video ("Parafora")
- Male Artist of the Year ("I Dio Mas" — Nominated)
- Video of the Year ("Parafora")
- Artist of the Year ("I Dio Mas")
- Best Catchphrase ("Emena Thes" — Nominated)

MTV Europe Music Awards

- Best Greek Act

Status Men of the Year Awards

- Singer of the Year (2009)
- Singer of the Year (2010)

== Personnel ==
All personnel adapted from liner notes

- Peter Aslanides – guitars
- Christos Avdelas – electric guitar, acoustic guitar, percussion
- Beetkraft – production, arrangement, remixing, backing vocals recording at Sofita Studios
- Michael Bibo for Skygate Productions – strings
- Aris Binis – co-production, recording engineer, remixing at Vox Recording Studios and Sterling Studios (Athens, Greece)
- Giannis Bournias – photography
- Chris Buseck – electric guitar, acoustic guitar
- Leonidas "Freakchild" Chantzaras – production, co-production, piano, all instruments at THE STORE!, Germany
- Thodoros Darmas – production, arrangement, keyboard
- Akis Deiximos – backing vocals
- Antonis Dominos – backing vocals
- Hendrik Eilers for lazymusic.de – remixing
- Giannis Grigoriou – bass
- Viktoria Halkiti – backing vocals
- Tasos Hamosfakidis – backing vocals recording at Studio Workshop
- Marcus Hone – drums
- Nektarios Kokkinos – executive producer
- Dimitris Kontopoulos – production, arrangement, programming, and synthesizers
- Spyros Kontakis – electric guitars
- Spyros Koudounis – drums
- Ilias Lakkas – voice recording at Studio Odeon
- Alex Leon – production, arrangement
- Alkis Misirlis – drums
- Dimitris Panagiotakopoulos – design
- Alex Panayi – backing vocals
- Alex Papakonstantinou – bass
- Carlos E. Perez – guitars
- Christos Pertsinidis – guitars
- Playmen – production, arrangement
- Progressive PR – management
- Sakis Rouvas – vocals, executive producer, clothing designer
- Giannis Siskos – grooming
- Soumka – production, arrangement, remixing at Studio C&C
- Sakis Rouvas Collection – clothing
- Sakis Rouvas Music – production and licensing
- Neil Sinclair – other guitars
- Frank Schluter – bass
- Paul Stefanidis – mastering at Viking Lounge Mastering Studios (Sydney)
- Sweetspot – mastering
- Chrysanthi Thomatou – styling
- Trident – sponsor

== Charts ==
Chart	Peak position
Greek Albums Chart (IFPI Greece)	1

== Release history ==
Region	Date	Label	Format	Version	Catalog No.
Greece	14 December 2010	Minos EMI	CD	Standard	50999094852
Greece	14 December 2010	Minos EMI	CD	Special	50999094852
Greece	24 December 2010	Minos EMI	Digital download	Standard	N/A
Australia	24 December 2010	Minos EMI	Digital download	Standard	N/A
Austria	24 December 2010	Minos EMI	Digital download	Standard	N/A
Belgium	24 December 2010	Minos EMI	Digital download	Standard	N/A
Bulgaria	TBR	Virginia Records	CD	Standard	TBA
Cyprus	14 December 2010	Minos EMI	CD	Standard	50999094852
Cyprus	14 December 2010	Minos EMI	CD	Special	50999094852
Denmark	24 December 2010	Minos EMI	Digital download	Standard	N/A
Finland	24 December 2010	Minos EMI	Digital download	Standard	N/A
France	24 December 2010	Minos EMI	Digital download	Standard	N/A
Germany	24 December 2010	Minos EMI	Digital download	Standard	N/A
Italy	24 December 2010	Minos EMI	Digital download	Standard	N/A
Ireland	24 December 2010	Minos EMI	Digital download	Standard	N/A
Netherlands	24 December 2010	Minos EMI	Digital download	Standard	N/A
New Zealand	24 December 2010	Minos EMI	Digital download	Standard	N/A
Norway	24 December 2010	Minos EMI	Digital download	Standard	N/A
Portugal	24 December 2010	Minos EMI	Digital download	Standard	N/A
Spain	24 December 2010	Minos EMI	Digital download	Standard	N/A
Sweden	24 December 2010	Minos EMI	Digital download	Standard	N/A
Switzerland	24 December 2010	Minos EMI	Digital download	Standard	N/A
United Kingdom	24 December 2010	Minos EMI	Digital download	Standard	N/A
