= Emena Thes =

Single by Sakis Rouvas

from the album Parafora
- Released: 4 May 2010
- Recorded: 2010
- Genre: Pop rock
- Length: 3:02
- Label: EMI/Minos
- Songwriter: Dimitris Fakos
- Producer: Leonidas "Freakchild" Chantzaras

Sakis Rouvas singles chronology
""Tharros I Alitheia" (with Tamta)" (2010)	"Emena Thes" (2010)	""Parafora""

"Emena Thes" (Greek: Εμένα Θες; English: I am the one you want) is the second single by Greek singer Sakis Rouvas from his 13th studio album Parafora. It is a romantic hard rock ballad written by Dimitris Fakos and produced by Freakchild. The song was released to radio stations on 4 May 2010. The song was further released as a digital single and reached the top five of the airplay charts.

Its music video was the subject of a contest held by Rouvas collaborator Trident, where one contestant was chosen to star in the video while nine others served minor roles. The music video, which was directed by White Room and possessed an atmospheric quality, was notable for its painted rotoscoping effect, marking a first in Greek cinematography. Rouvas performed the song at the MAD Video Music Awards 2010 with a stage show that received wide acclaim for its unique camera work and concept.

== Background ==
"Emena Thes" was written by Dimitris Fakos and produced by Leonidas "Freakchild" Chantzaras, the first time Rouvas has collaborated with both. It is his solo follow-up single to "Spase To Hrono" which reached number one on all Greek charts, becoming his fourth consecutive single to do so, and also the follow-up to Tamta's single "Tharros I Alitheia", which he is featured in and became a major club hit while also charting high in airplay. When Rouvas released "Pio Dinata" (This Is Our Night) and "Spase To Hrono", it was unclear whether the tracks were to be included on a further reissue of his last studio album Irthes or if the musician was planning a new album. "Spase To Hrono" was released to promote Trident's "free your senses" campaign and as part of that they hosted a contest where the winner would be able to spend 48 hours with Rouvas, ten runners-up would star in his video, while another 100 would receive a copy of his new album before it was released, indicating that the last two singles will be included on an album of new material.

The song first appeared through Rouvas' official website and Cypriot music website Music.Net.cy on 4 May 2010 as both a promo and radio single and was released on 7 June as a digital single. The song's release coincided with the launch of Rouvas' concert series at Politia in Thessaloniki, where it was added to the modified setlist.

== Composition and theme ==
"Emena Thes" is a power ballad with hard rock influences. The song begins with a piano introduction and follows the traditional verse-chorus format. The romantic ballad, a style Rouvas has become notable for over the years of his career, lyrically finds him asking the night and the stars what is to become of a troubled relationship. Rouvas professes his love to his lover, who still has not realized that she is in love with him, with the hook saying "Wherever you go, whatever you say, I am the one you want".

== Chart performance ==
The song peaked at number twelve on the Nielsen Greek Music Control Airplay Chart the week following Rouvas' MAD VMA victory and performance, moving up 17 spots from the previous week. It was also the third highest-charting Greek-language song for that week in the Top 20 chart.

== Music video ==
=== Development ===
Originally, Proto Thema reported that the music video would be shot in the week following the Balkan Music Awards, held on 16 May 2010, where Rouvas won the award for Best Balkan Song from Greece for his previous single, and, according to the newspaper, had planned to perform the song at the ceremony in Sofia, Bulgaria. However, this did not materialize due to the entertainer's work obligations and thus he gave his acceptance speech via satellite from Thessaloniki where he had recently launched his Politia Live Clubbing concert series. Rouvas made a brief return to Athens, specifically to the suburb of Vouliagmeni, for the 19 May filming of the video. The setting was the Astir Palace hotel and the nearby beach. "Emena Thes" was directed by White Room, who Rouvas had first collaborated with for the video of "Na M'agapas" in 2005 as well as "Mila Tis", "Ego Travao Zori", Ola Gyro Sou Gyrizoun", and "Zise Ti Zoi" later on, making him one of the first artists to work with the company in its beginning. During the filming, Rouvas informed fans of his whereabouts via his account on the social networking website Twitter, posting a photograph of himself on set that revealed one of his looks for the video, which was a black outfit with dark aviator sunglasses. This earned him further praise for efficiently using technology to communicate with fans. Also involved in this music video are the ten runners-up of the "Spase To Hrono Me Ton Saki Rouvas Kia Trident" (Shatter time with Sakis Rouvas and Trident) competition, which garnered thousands of participants and as a second place prize offered the winners the opportunity to be involved in his next music video. Of those ten, two women were chosen to star in the video with Rouvas, Cypriots Lorena Savvidou from Lemesos and Rafaela Savva from Nicosia. The two winners were given VIP treatment courtesy of Trident Senses and received the opportunity to chat and be photographed with Rouvas. The remaining winners also met Rouvas and were allowed to follow the duration of filming as well as be involved in the creation of the music video in more minor roles.

=== Synopsis ===
A painting effect portraying Rouvas and his lover on the beach in the "Emena Thes" music video.

Prior to its official airdate, SigmaLive described it as "highly atmospheric." The music video is set in three different locations: a hotel lobby, a bedroom, and on the beach. Although it was originally reported that both winners would appear in the video, only one was finally chosen to star. The others can be seen in minor roles as guests and workers in the lobby. The video chronicles the romance and conflict between the singer and his love interest, while making heavy use of visual art, with each scene presented as a watercolour painting, while in the intervals close-ups of Rouvas singing in front of a black background are shown. Additional artwork is shown of the surrounding environment, including buildings, the night sky, and birds flying across the sky. Throughout the video a live action/animation effect called rotoscoping is utilized, a first in Greek cinematography. It begins with Rouvas asleep and moves to him and his love interest sitting in a hotel lobby while the assistant brings over their luggage. They appear to be in a conflict, facing different directions. They then appear on the beach on better terms, while advertisements for the song's sponsor, Trident, are shown when the two characters each take a stick of gum. Snippets of love scenes are also played, while in some parts they are each shown separately and close-up shots show the woman's make-up smeared from crying, while animated tears also run down her face. During the bridge the two finally face each other in the lobby scene and as they lean in to kiss the rotoscoping animation momentarily smooths out. This is followed by another love scene and ends with the two walking out of the room.

An additional music video of the live performance of the song at the MAD Video Music Awards 2010 was also officially aired by the network.

=== Release and reception ===
The music video aired for the first time on MAD TV on 21 June 2010. It received favourable reviews from Cypriot music network Music.Net.cy who praised the direction by White Room, calling it "beautiful" and were also approving of the animation.

== Live performances ==
The first live performance of the song was made at the premiere of the artist's Politia Live Clubbing concert series in Thessaloniki on 14 May. For the live performance of the song it is played with smoke and bright green and pink lights in the background as Rouvas sings standing in front of a microphone stand while playing his black Gibson Les Paul. Rouvas was also short-listed as a performer at the MAD Video Music Awards 2010, where he led the nominations for a solo artist with six, and performed a similar routine as the third act of the night. For the performance, all of the lights in the stadium were dimmed to bring lights from the cellular phones of audience members into prominence, while an animation of the new "Sakis" logo, also exhibited on the single cover, ran on the black video wall as Rouvas appeared on stage wearing tight black pants, unlaced boots, and a torn black T-shirt designed by Dimitris Kaïdantzis, while playing an excerpt of an unrelated guitar riff as he walked to his platform on the side of the stage. The music subsequently began with Rouvas singing in front of a stand and playing guitar simultaneously, while below him a grid exuded gold lighting and smoke and behind him an outtake of the then-unreleased music video, featuring a close-up of Rouvas singing in front of a black background, as well as additional imagery, was played on the video wall. In the final chorus, the platform raised Rouvas several feet in the air above the audience, while confetti was distributed all over the stadium. The performance was reviewed favourably, with MAD TV deeming it "explosive," while it was "unique" to the awards' standard, where upbeat, choreographed performances are usually favoured by artists. While most negative criticism of the performance centred on the selection of the song itself being wrong for the event, especially as Rouvas is known for his elebarate stage shows and choreography, the innovative camera work and stage presentation was widely acclaimed, with Madata calling it an "impressive extreme." The song will also be part of Rouvas' set list on his forthcoming tour following Politeia.

== Track listing ==
1. "Emena Thes"

== Personnel ==
- Sakis Rouvas – vocals, executive producer
- Dimitris Fakos – songwriter
- Leonidas Freakchild Chantzaras – producer

== Charts ==
Chart	Peak position
Nielson Greek Music Control Airplay Chart	12
Nielsen Greek Top 20 Airplay Chart	9

== Release history ==
Region	Date	Label	Format
Greece	4 May 2010	Minos EMI	Radio single, promo single
Greece	7 June 2010	Minos EMI	Digital download
Cyprus	4 May 2010	Minos EMI	Radio single
