= Alter Ego (soundtrack) =

Soundtrack album by Sakis Rouvas and various artists
- Released: June 2007
- Recorded: 2007
- Genre: Rock ambient
- Length: 63:37
- Language: English; Greek
- Label: Minos EMI
- Producer: Soumka

Singles from Alter Ego
- 1. "Zise Ti Zoi" Released: 28 May 2007

Alter Ego is the soundtrack for the film of the same name. It was released in June 2007 by Minos EMI. All five singles from the soundtrack are sung by popular singer Sakis Rouvas, who also made his feature film début, interpreting the lead role of Stefanos.

== Album information ==
=== Producers and collaborators ===
The soundtrack was produced by Soumka, who composed all of the instrumental pieces for the film score. Singer-songwriter Pimis Petrou composed all of the lyrical songs, while Antonis Vardis, one of the most successful Greek composers, composed the song "Zise Ti Zoi" for Sakis Rouvas, which was the main theme to promote the film in the mainstream. Rouvas contributed vocally to five songs on the soundtrack, two of which, namely "One With This World" and "Nothing" were duets with his co-star Doretta Papadimitriou and were performed in the film by the actors as the group Alter Ego. The song "Suspicious Minds" was written by Mark James and originally performed by Elvis Presley, but was covered by Rouvas. The majority of the songs are performed or titled in English, as was chosen by the film's producers for marketing reasons. Other than Rouvas, vocal performers include Dimitris Wang, Vello Leaf, V-Sag, Alexandra McKay, Baby Queen, The First Aid, and Mama.

The song "Zise Ti Zoi" became a hit and was also separately released as a CD single and digital download. The song "A Look of You" performed by V-Sag is the theme for the opening credits of the film.

== Track listing ==
#	Title	Lyricist(s)	Composer(s)	Time
1.	"Angel's Call"	–	Soumka	1:28
2.	"Zise Ti Zoi" (Sakis Rouvas)	Vasilis Giannopoulos	Antonis Vardis	3:26
3.	"Nothing" (Sakis Rouvas feat. Doretta Papadimitriou)	Elias Doxakis	Pimis Petrou	2:54
4.	"Daylight"	–	Soumka	0:49
5.	"What If..."	–	Soumka	1:03
6.	"Dreaming"	–	Soumka	2:51
7.	"Suspicious Minds" (Sakis Rouvas)	Mark James	Mark James	4:41
8.	"One With This World" (Sakis Rouvas feat. Doretta Papadimitriou)	Maria Tombazou	Pimis Petrou	3:44
9.	"Dying in My Soul" (Dimitris Wang)	Nikolas Dimitropoulos	Soumka	4:15
10.	"Fear"	–	Soumka	0:39
11.	"Memories"	–	Soumka	1:47
12.	"Misunderstanding"	–	Soumka	2:53
13.	"Game Over"	–	Soumka	2:49
14.	"Mi Mou Xanafygeis Pia" (Sakis Rouvas)	Ares Davarakis	Pimis Petrou	3:45
15.	"One Last Tear" (Alter Ego Mix) (Vello Leaf feat. Alexandra McKay)	Michalis Koulieris	Vello Leaf	3:53
16.	"A Look of You" (V-Sag feat. Baby Queen)	Eleni Riga	Eleni Riga	3:06
17.	"Roses"	–	Soumka	2:36
18.	"Main Love Theme"	–	Soumka	1:16
19.	"Hearts" (The First Aid feat. Flora Ioannidi)	Theo Economou	Vangelis Kounadis	5:46
20.	"Pure"	–	Soumka	0:33
21.	"Feel"	–	Soumka	0:59
22.	"Fall"	–	Soumka	2:34
23.	"Have a Nice Trip" (Mama)	Manolis Zografakis	Manolis Zografakis	7:20
24.	"Alter Ego Main Theme"	–	Soumka	1:39
25.	"Lonely"	–	Soumka	1:51

== Singles ==
- "One With This World"
- "Zise Ti Zoi"
- "Suspicious Minds"
- "Nothing"
- "Mi Mou Xanafygeis Pia"
