= Zise Ti Zoi =

Single by Sakis Rouvas

from the album Alter Ego (soundtrack)
- Released: 28 May 2007
- Recorded: 2007
- Genre: Rock
- Length: 3:23
- Label: Minos EMI
- Songwriter: Vasilis Giannopoulos
- Producer: Antonis Vardis

Sakis Rouvas singles chronology
"Na M'agapas" (2005)	"Zise Ti Zoi" (2007)	"This Is Our Night" (2009)

Alternative covers

"Zise Ti Zoi" is a single by Greek singer Sakis Rouvas from the Alter Ego original soundtrack, released on 28 May 2007 in Greece and Cyprus by Minos EMI.

== Background ==
=== Production history ===
The song "Zise Ti Zoi" was composed as the theme to the Greek film Alter Ego that was released on 10 May 2007 and starred Sakis Rouvas. The song was composed by Antonis Vardis, while the lyrics were written by Vasilis Giannopoulos. The CD single included four of the radio singles from the Alter Ego soundtrack, all of which were performed by Rouvas. Two of the songs are duets with Doretta Papadimitriou who played Nefeli in the film, opposite Rouvas.

== Track listing ==
CD single

#	Title	English translation	Songwriter	Production credit	Time
1.	"Zise Ti Zoi"	"Live Life"	Vasilis Giannopoulos	Antonis Vardis	3:23
2.	"Nothing" (feat. Doretta Papadimitriou)	–	Elias Doxakis	Pimis Petrou	2:54
3.	"Mi Mou Xanafygeis Pia"	"Don't You Ever Leave Me Again"	Ares Davarakis	Pimis Petrou	3:45
4.	"One With This World" (feat. Doretta Papadimitriou)	–	Maria Tombazou	Pimis Petrou	3:44

iTunes release

#	Title	English translation	Songwriter	Production credit	Time
1.	"Zise Ti Zoi"	"Live Life"	Vasilis Giannopoulos	Antonis Vardis	3:23

== Music video ==
The music video was directed by production company White Room. It features many scenes from the film Alter Ego as well as newly filmed material.

== Release history ==
Region	Date	Label	Format
Greece	28 May 2007	Minos EMI	Radio single, promo single
Greece	28 May 2007	Minos EMI	Digital download
Cyprus	June 2007	Minos EMI	CD single, digital download
