= Sakis Rouvas Collection =

- Sakis Rouvas Collection logo (2010)
- Type: Private Limited liability company
- Industry: Fashion
- Founded: Athens, Greece (2010)
- Defunct: Athens, Greece (2013)
- Headquarters: Athens, Greece
- Key people: Sakis Rouvas
- Products: Male and female apparel

The Sakis Rouvas Collection was a ready-to-wear fashion brand headed by Greek entertainer Sakis Rouvas. Launched in 2010, the collection was made available exclusively through Sprider Stores, Greece's largest department store franchise at the time. This collaboration marked Rouvas as the first Greek artist to establish his own fashion line.

However, in February 2012, a fire occurred at the company's headquarters in Anthousa, resulting in the total destruction of the building. Initially, the fire was attributed by the press to "hooded rioters" who had caused disturbances in central Athens as a reaction to the passing of the austerity memorandum. The fire resulted in the total destruction of the building, leading to the eventual closure of the stores and the discontinuation of the Sakis Rouvas Collection in 2013.

== History and premise ==
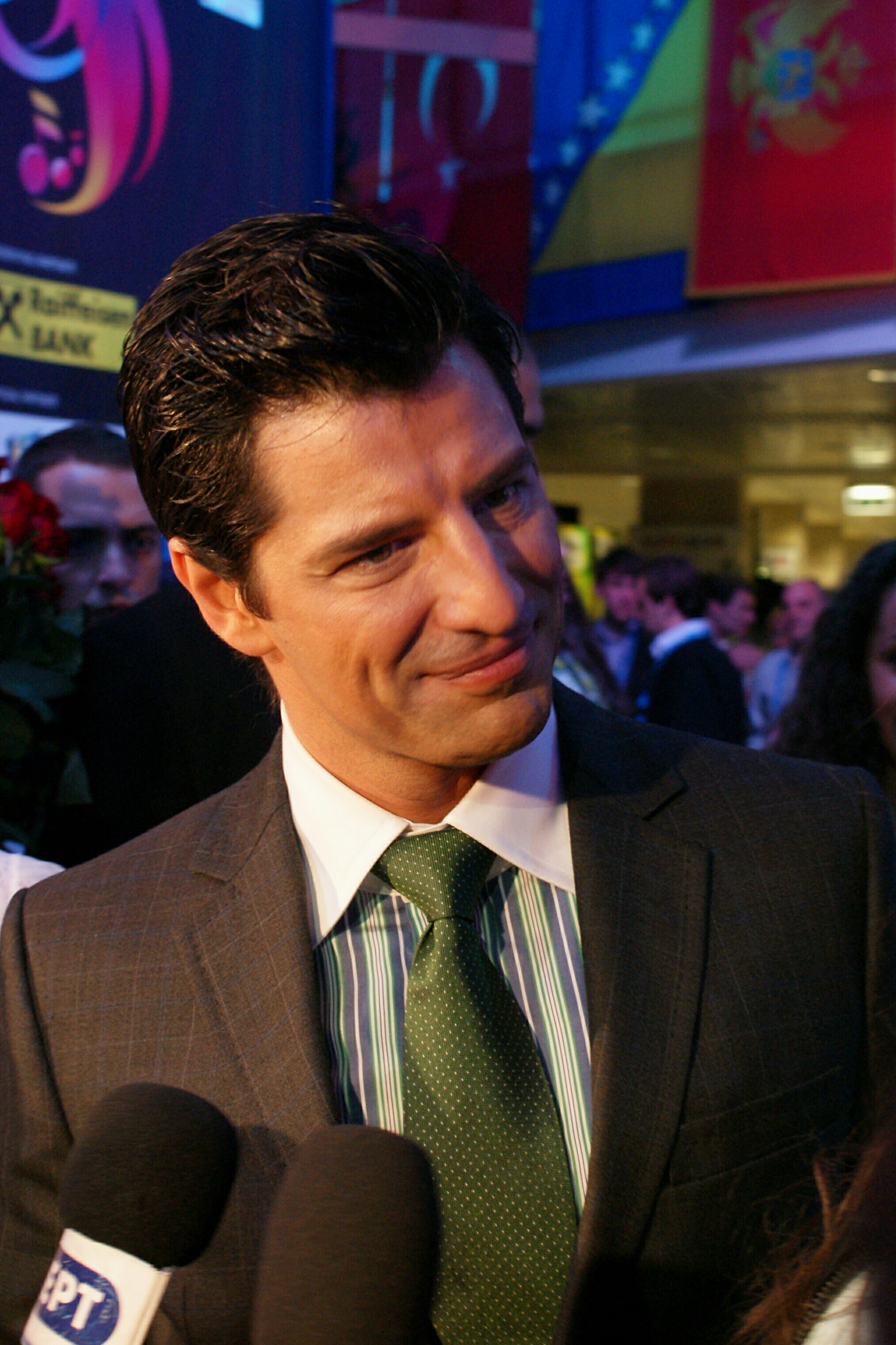
Rouvas (as seen here on 10 May 2009) is the head of the fashion label, becoming the first Greek artist to have their own label.

Sakis Rouvas had long been considered a fashion and style icon in Greece. He was known for having several trademark looks, such as various jackets, leather pants, and aviator sunglasses. He received accolades such as Celebrity with Best Personal Style from MAD TV, one of the two musicians awarded for fashion, as well as Best Dressed Artist in a Video in 2006 and Fashion Icon of the Year in 2010 at the MAD Video Music Awards. He has been cited as influencing fashion among musicians and many other artists have been cited to imitate his personal style. Rouvas has been the first Greek artist to market himself through merchandise, and with the launch of the Sakis Rouvas Collection he became the first Greek artist to have his own fashion label. It further expanded the entrepreneurial image Rouvas had established for himself within the period of 2009–2010, having launched business ventures such as a restaurant, night club, beauty salon franchise, and film and television production company.

For the creation of his fashion label, Rouvas teamed up with several professional fashion designers and stylists to create the looks, while he also had creative input in the design department, choosing styles, giving his ideas on and approving designs. Rouvas' partner since 2003, supermodel Katia Zygouli, gave some input on the female designs. According to its publications, the brand's top priority is about the comfort of the wearer, as well as aesthetics, beauty, and elegance, and attention to detail. Rouvas summarized: "I wanted to create an entire collection that would express my aesthetics, to answer to the [financial] needs of the current times, without making discounts in quality and to be loved by the consumers who will find a distinct perception of fashion that everyone can interpret according to their own style and persona."

However, on February 13, 2012, a fire broke out at the company's headquarters in Anthousa, leading to the building's complete destruction. The fire was initially attributed by the press to "hooded rioters" who had been causing disturbances in Athens in response to the passing of the austerity memorandum. This incident ultimately led to the closure of Sprider Stores and the discontinuation of the Sakis Rouvas Collection.

== Marketing ==
Rumours of Rouvas beginning his own fashion label began in 2010; at the MAD Video Music Awards 2010, where Rouvas won Fashion Icon of the Year, fashion designer and stylist Lakis Gavalas, who presented the award to him, hinted at the label's launch by asking the entertainer his thoughts about launching one. The label is exclusively available at Greek department store retailer Sprider Store, Greece's largest multinational department store franchise. Rouvas officially announced the label's launch on July 27, 2010, at the Corinth stop of his summer tour. The line was inaugurated on 16 September at the Vogue Fashion's Night Out at the Sprider Store on Ermou Street 54 in downtown Athens.

The brand caters equally to both sexes and is marketed towards a contemporary young adult market. The logo is Rouvas' signature, part of his Sakis Rouvas franchise brand, which includes ownership of other merchandise such as a line of dolls and music recording masters.

On the 26th of July 2010, the official teaser for the brand was released, featuring Rouvas in a design room, approving designs and trying on the clothing. Rouvas discussed the label on the premiere of Vrady Me Ton Petro Kostopoulo on 6 October, where he joked that the reason why he decided to create it was because "he had no more clothing as he is constantly ripping his at concerts". In October 2010, a television commercial for the line was released.

== Reception ==
Madata praised Rouvas' marketing innovation stating that he "demonstrated again that he is the one and only superstar in the country and a role model for many young people" as well as adding that "[f]urthermore, he has nothing to be envious of foreign stars who put their signatures on perfumes, clothing, accessories, and anything else you can imagine". Anny Tzotzadini of Greek Reporter believed that it would change the standards of marketing in Greece.
