= Alter Ego (2007 film) =

2007 film

- Alter Ego DVD cover.
- Directed by: Nicholas Dimitropoulos
- Written by: Vana Dimitriou, Nicholas Dimitropoulos
- Starring: Sakis Rouvas; Doretta Papadimitriou; Danai Skiadi; Kostis Kallivretakis
- Music by: Soumka
- Distributed by: Village Roadshow Films (Greece)
- Release date: May 10, 2007
- Running time: 98 minutes
- Countries: Greece, Cyprus
- Language: Greek

Alter Ego is a Greek drama film released in 2007, starring singer Sakis Rouvas in his movie debut. Rouvas plays the frontman of a popular rock band whose life changes after a heartbreaking tragedy. The film co-stars Danai Skiadi.

Produced by Village Roadshow Films (Greece), it premiered on May 10, 2007 in Greek theaters. The soundtrack includes five songs by Rouvas.

== Plot summary ==
Stefanos is the frontman, guitarist, and soul of the incredibly popular rock band Alter Ego. In recent years, the band has had groundbreaking success, and their potential surpasses those of international standards. However, a twist of fate changes their path on their journey to fortune and fame, and the group is ultimately rocked by a heartbreaking tragedy, especially Stefanos who needs to find the will and determination to move on.

== Cast ==
- Sakis Rouvas - Stefanos
- Danae Skiadi - Ariadne
- Doretta Papadimitriou - Nefele
- Kostis Kallivretakis - Philippos
- Dimitris Kouroubalis - Timos
- Alexandros Logothetis - Argyris
- Laertis Malkotsis - Andreas
- Evdokia Statiri - Nadia
- Mairi Louisi - Roula
- Joseph King - Himself

== DVD release ==
The film was released on DVD in December 2007 in Greece. The DVD contains both English subtitles and Greek for the hearing-impaired. It also includes many behind-the-scenes features of Sakis Rouvas and the rest of the cast.

== Box office ==
The film sold an estimated number of more than 250,000 cinema tickets.

== Soundtrack ==
- Alter Ego (soundtrack)
