= Spase To Hrono =

Single by Sakis Rouvas

Single by Sakis Rouvas

from the album Parafora
- Released: 20 November 2009
- Recorded: 2009
- Length: 3:22
- Label: EMI/Minos
- Songwriters: Dimitris Kontopoulos, Pigi Konstantinou
- Producer: Dimitris Kontopoulos

Sakis Rouvas singles chronology
| "Pio Dinata" (2009) | "Spase To Hrono" (2009) | "Tharros I Alitheia" (2009) |

"Spase To Hrono" (Greek: "Σπάσε το Χρόνο"; English: Shatter time) is a song by Greek pop musician Sakis Rouvas, composed by Greek composer Dimitris Kontopoulos, who had worked with Sakis Rouvas in recent years, as well as his contribution to Eurovision Song Contest. It was released as a radio single on 20 November 2009 in Greece and Cyprus and is the follow-up single to his number-one hit and Greek Eurovision Song Contest 2009 entry "This Is Our Night" and its Greek-language counterpart "Pio Dinata". The song serves as the first single from Rouvas' album Parafora, released in December 2010.

== Composition and theme ==
"Spase To Hrono" is a song similar to Rouvas' most recent number-one hits "This Is Our Night" and "+ Se Thelo", although it contains more urban influences. Vocally it showcases a large range of dynamics. The song maintains one main strong, constant beat throughout. The Vocals begin almost immediately, with Rouvas singing using whispering, gritty vocals in the commencing rhythmic, detached verses. The song progresses into smoother vocals and higher dynamics, and then returning to the original pattern in the pre-chorus. It finally moves into higher dynamics in the more melodic chorus, followed by a bridge with added sound effects, finally repeating the pre-chorus and chorus before fading abruptly. Lyrically the song deals with Rouvas speaking to a romantic interest and offering words of encouragement.

== Release and promotion ==
The song premiered exclusively on Rhythmos FM 94.9 in Athens on the evening of 20 November 2009. Rhythmos also announced that Rouvas would do an exclusive interview with Rythmos' radio personality Makis Pounentis on 25 November, promising an interview different from previous ones. Rouvas also announced who else would be performing in a concert series for the winter with the pop artist Tamta at a well-known Athens venue, although the venue has yet been announced. Originally, performances were to commence on November 20, coinciding with the song's release, however the show premiere was delayed and remains unknown as Rouvas decided to change the venue he was booked at. Nevertheless, "Spase To Hrono" is expected to be part of the modified set list. Rouvas is also the presenter of the Greek version of The X-Factor for the second year, where he is expected to perform in episodes in the near future.

== Music video ==
Rouvas reported via his Twitter account that he was shooting a music video for the song on December 23. The message was accompanied by a preview photo showing shadowy figures of Rouvas and two women on a four square grid, each background a different color.

== Chart performance ==
The song debuted at number one on the Greek Digital Singles and the following week it went number three behind Lady Gaga's "Bad Romance" and Kesha's "Tik Tok". It also reached number one on both the Greek and Greek and international airplay charts, making it Rouvas' fourth consecutive single to top all Greek charts, following "+ Se Thelo", "Irthes", and "This Is Our Night".

== Track listings ==
Digital download

1. "Spase To Hrono"

Spase To Hrono – EP (#5099968596289)

1. "Spase To Hrono"
2. "Pio Dinata" (This Is Our Night)
3. "Tha Trelatho" (Out of Control)
4. "Mi Milas" (Right on Time)
5. "This Is Our Night"
6. "Out of Control"
7. "Right on Time"
8. "Hamogela"
9. "Irthes"
10. "+ Se Thelo"

== Charts ==
| Chart | Peak position |
|---|---|
| Cypriot Airplay Chart | 1 |
| Greek Airplay Chart | 1 |
| Greek/International Airplay Chart | 1 |
| Greek Digital Singles Chart | 1 |

== Reception ==
Rhythmos FM, which exclusively premiered the song, conducted a poll for its fans where 80.6 percent of 345 listeners reacted positively to the song in the first couple of days.

== Release history ==
| Region | Date | Label | Format |
|---|---|---|---|
| Greece | 20 November 2009 | Minos EMI | Radio single, promo single |
| Greece | 14 December 2009 | Minos EMI | Digital download |
| Cyprus | 20 November 2009 | Minos EMI | Radio single |

== Personnel ==
- Sakis Rouvas – vocals
