= Athinon Arena =

Music venue in Athens, Greece

Coordinates: 37.9717409°N 23.7040597°E

The Athinon Arena pictured as the Pantheon Theater

The Athinon Arena (Αθηνών Αρένα), sometimes referred to as Athens Arena, was a grand music venue in Athens, Greece. It was built in 2004 as a large-scale convention centre and concert hall, designed to host up to 3,000 people seated. It was owned by the Papatheoharis Group. Artists featured in the Arena are Marinella, Antonis Remos, Sakis Rouvas and Anna Vissi. Since 2005, it was the venue for the Greek preselection final Ellinikós Telikós, for the Eurovision Song Contest. On 23 and 24 September 2010, the arena was the venue for the 1st Eurovoice Music Contest, hosted by Pamela Anderson and Éric Serra, with special guests Enrique Iglesias and Anastacia.

Some of the shows hosted at the Athens Arena included: Marinella & Antonis Remos - Ta Logia Einai Peritta (2006), Marinella & Antonis Remos - S' Ena Tango (2007), Antonis Remos - Day+Night (2008), Anna Vissi - The Fabulous Show (2009), Anna Vissi & Sakis Rouvas - Face2Face Show (2010).

In 2014 the arena was transformed into a 1,600-seat theatre and renamed the Pantheon Theater. After three years operating as theatre for musicals, in 2017 the venue became again concert hall under its initial name Athinon Arena.

Since 2024 the arena is out of use and in the process to be transformed again, this time to an office building.
