= Kai Se Thelo =

"+ Se Thelo"

Single by Sakis Rouvas

from the album I Megaliteres Epitihies + Kai Se Thelo, Irthes
- Released: 17 June 2008
- Recorded: 2008
- Studio: Studio Sierra
- Length: 3:53
- Label: Minos EMI
- Songwriters: Vicky Gerothodorou; Dimitris Kontopoulos
- Producer: Dimitris Kontopoulos

Sakis Rouvas singles chronology
"Stous 31 Dromous" (2007)	"+ Se Thelo" (2008)	"Irthes" (2008)

Audio sample
- file; help

"Kai Se Thelo" (stylized as "+ Se Thelo") is a single by popular Greek singer Sakis Rouvas from the album Irthes, released as a radio single on 17 June 2008 in Greece and Cyprus.

== Background information ==
=== Production history ===
Dimitris Kontopoulos was the composer of the song along with lyricist Vicky Gerothodorou. The duo had previously produced Rouvas' massive 2007 hit "Ola Gyro Sou Gyrizoun" as well as "Stous 31 Dromous". Rouvas' last album release was in late 2006, and with the exception of "Stous 31 Dromous", the theme of the show of the same name, and the recordings for the Alter Ego he had not produced any new album material since the release of Iparhi Agapi Edo. This was due to Rouvas' work on both his début film and the filming of a new English-language psychological thriller that was being filmed on Los Angeles, so for the majority of the past two years, Rouvas had been living outside Greece and was unable to record.

With filming nearly completed, as well as taking a break from international projects, Rouvas returned to Greece in Spring of 2008. It was then when he started doing performances in Thessaloniki with Peggy Zina. He premiered his new song at the Video Music Awards 2008 where he also won the award for Best Male Artist on 17 June 2008. Kontopoulos and Rouvas decided to release the song as a digital download in order to test the market.

=== Lyrical content and style ===
The song features a very strong and persistent beat throughout the song. It plays on combining both syllabic dance rhythms with a melismatic style. The song also includes a vocal expression which Rouvas is known for, which is the dramatic change in dynamics, with the verses being sung in a sultry manner, while the chorus is sung full volume, allowing Rouvas to use a large vocal range. Lyrically, the song finds Rouvas telling his lover that he wants her and is in need of her. The lyrics are likely sexualized as is its interpretation.

== Track listing ==
Greek iTunes

#	Title	English translation	Songwriter	Production credit	Time
1.	"+ Se Thelo"	"And I Want You"	Vicky Gerothodorou	Dimitris Kontopoulos	3:53

== Music video ==
The original performance of "+ Se Thelo" at the Video Music Awards proved to be very popular and was played regularly by MAD TV as the official music video. However, the official video for the song didn't premiere until December, thus it was able to top the charts without the promotion of a music video clip. The video features Rouvas dressed in sleek black clothing, singing and dancing in front of a bright blue background full of graphic shapes and designs and elaborate lighting. Surrounding Rouvas are numerous provocatively-dressed women crawling around him.

== Release history ==
Region	Date	Label	Format
Greece	17 June 2008	Minos EMI	Radio single, Promo single
Greece	July 2008	Minos EMI	CD single
Cyprus	July 2008	Minos EMI	CD single

== Reception ==
Critical reception of the song was very favorable, as was that of the commercial audience who supplied a strong demand for airplay. The song is considered to be amongst Rouvas' most successful hits and defining performances.

== Chart performance ==
The song became the most successfully charting song of the year 2008. It was the most-played song of the summer season, and the strong airplay placed the song at number 1 on the Nielson Top 20 Greek Airplay Chart for 10 consecutive weeks. The song also débuted at number 1 on the Greek iTunes Store where it also remained for many weeks, while in addition claiming the number 1 spot on the Cypriot chart.

=== Charts ===
Chart	Peak position
Cypriot Airplay Chart	1
Greek Airplay Chart	1
Greek/International Airplay Chart	1
Greek Billboard Digital Singles Chart	1
