= Irthes =

Irthes 'Ηρθες

Studio album by Sakis Rouvas
- Released: 3 December 2008
- Recorded: Summer 2008, January 2009
- Genre: Pop/rock, dance, R&B, urban
- Length: 32:48 (Original); 46:25 (This Is Our Night)
- Language: Greek (Original); English (This Is Our Night)
- Label: EMI/Minos
- Producer: Dimitris Kontopoulos

Sakis Rouvas chronology
Iparhi Agapi Edo (2006)	Irthes 'Ηρθες (2008)	Parafora (2009)

This Is Our Night
- The cover of the This Is Our Night edition

Singles from Irthes
- 1. "+ Se Thelo" Released: July 2008; 2. "Irthes" Released: 20 November 2008; 3. "This Is Our Night" Released: 12 February 2009; 4. "Ksehna To Prin Kai To Meta" Released: 23 September 2009

Irthes (Greek: 'Ηρθες; English: You arrived) is the title of the 12th studio album by Greek singer Sakis Rouvas. The album was released on 3 December 2008 by Minos EMI and is his first new album since 2006. The album features 10 songs primarily composed by Dimitris Kontopoulos. The title track of the album, Irthes, was written as a dedication to Rouvas' newborn baby girl. The main sponsors of the album are Trident, and once again Vodafone Greece.

In April, the album was repackaged to include Rouvas' 2009 Eurovision Song Contest entry "This Is Our Night", along with the two other songs he sang at the Greek national final, which are included in English and in Greek. The album was subsequently renamed This Is Our Night. The album was ranked as the fourth best Greek album of 2009 by Ethnos.

== Conception ==
=== Background and recording ===
Irthes marks Rouvas' 12th studio album in his career and first new album in two years. Rouvas began working on the album in the summer 2008, collaborating mainly with Dimitris Kontopoulos. The title track of the album was written for Rouvas' daughter. It is expected that the album will be repackaged in Spring 2009 with Rouvas' Eurovision songs. The album is mainly composed by Dimitris Kontopoulos, with Sanny X making a contribution to one song. Lyricists on the album include Giannis Rentoumis, Giannis Doxas, Nikos Gritsis, Thanos Papanikolaou, Vicky Gerothodorou, and Pigi Konstantinou.

== Track listing ==
=== Original release ===
No.	Title	Lyrics	Music	Length
1.	"Paradothika" (Παραδόθηκα; I surrendered)	Giannis Rendoumis	Dimitris Kontopoulos	4:30
2.	"Irthes" (Ήρθες; You arrived)	Giannis Doxas	Dimitris Kontopoulos	3:42
3.	"Xechna to Prin ke to Meta" (Ξέχνα το πριν και το μετά; Forget the before and the after)	Nikos Gritsis	Dimitris Kontopoulos	2:57
4.	"Vimata" (Βήματα; Steps)	Thanos Papanikolaou	Dimitris Kontopoulos	4:04
5.	"+ Se Thelo" (+ σε θέλω; And I want you)	Vicky Gerothodorou	Dimitris Kontopoulos	4:16
6.	"Hamogela" (Χαμογέλα; Smile)	Giannis Rendoumis	Dimitris Kontopoulos	4:15
7.	"An Borousa" (Αν μπορούσα; If I could)	Pigi Konstantinou	Dimitris Kontopoulos	3:21
8.	"Pano Mou Kratisou" (Πάνω μου κρατήσου; Hold on to me)	Vicky Gerothodorou	Sanny X	4:13
9.	"Ela Mazi Mou" (Έλα μαζί μου; Come with me)	Vicky Gerothodorou	Dimitris Kontopoulos	3:50
10.	"Kapia Mera" (Κάποια μέρα; Some day)	Vangelis Konstantinidis	Dimitris Kontopoulos	3:50

=== This Is Our Night (2009) ===
No.	Title	Lyrics	Music	Length
1.	"This Is Our Night"	Craig Porteils, Cameron Giles-Webb	Dimitris Kontopoulos	2:59
2.	"Mi Milas (Right on Time)" (Μη μιλάς; Don't speak)	Vicky Gerothodorou	Dimitris Kontopoulos	3:03
3.	"Tha Trelatho (Out of Control)" (Θα Τρελαθώ; I will go insane)	Alexandra Zakka	Dimitris Kontopoulos	2:58
4.	"Paradothika" (Παραδόθηκα; I surrendered)	Giannis Rendoumis	Dimitris Kontopoulos	4:30
5.	"Irthes" (Ήρθες; You arrived)	Giannis Doxas	Dimitris Kontopoulos	3:42
6.	"Xechna to Prin ke to Meta" (Ξέχνα το πριν και το μετά; Forget the before and the after)	Nikos Gritsis	Dimitris Kontopoulos	2:57
7.	"Vimata" (Βήματα; Steps)	Thanos Papanikolaou	Dimitris Kontopoulos	4:04
8.	"+ Se Thelo" (+ σε θέλω; And I want you)	Vicky Gerothodorou	Dimitris Kontopoulos	4:16
9.	"Hamogela" (Χαμογέλα; Smile)	Giannis Rendoumis	Dimitris Kontopoulos	4:15
10.	"An Borousa" (Αν μπορούσα; If I could)	Pigi Konstantinou	Dimitris Kontopoulos	3:21
11.	"Pano Mou Kratisou" (Πάνω μου κρατήσου; Hold on to me)	Vicky Gerothodorou	Sanny X	4:13
12.	"Ela Mazi Mou" (Έλα μαζί μου; Come with me)	Vicky Gerothodorou	Dimitris Kontopoulos	3:50
13.	"Kapia Mera" (Κάποια μέρα; Some day)	Vangelis Konstantinidis	Dimitris Kontopoulos	3:50
14.	"Right on Time"	Craig Porteils, Cameron Giles-Webb	Dimitris Kontopoulos	3:03
15.	"Out of Control"	Alexandra Zakka	Dimitris Kontopoulos	2:58

== Singles ==
"+ Se Thelo"

The lead single of the album titled "+ Se Thelo" (Kai Se Thelo; And I want you) was released in July 2008 as a digital download. It is a dance song composed by Dimitris Kontopoulos and was first presented live by Rouvas on 17 June 2008 at the MAD Video Music Awards 2008. The performance featured complex choreography and lighting, as well as an overall Japanese inspired theme on the background video screen and with the dancers' costumes. Footage from the performance was later used for the official video clip of the song. After its digital release, the song became a dance hit and has reached number one on the Greek airplay charts as well as the Greek iTunes chart for many weeks.

"Irthes"

The second single, and title track of the album, is the ballad "Irthes", not to be confused with the same named electropop track of the previous album Iparhi Agapi Edo. "Irthes" was released to radio stations on 20 November 2008, and has music by Dimitris Kontopoulos with lyrics by Yiannis Doxas. The song became a moderate hit, peaking at number 18 on the Greek Airplay Chart, however, it is one of Rouvas' lower charting songs. The first music video, directed by Kostas Kapetanidis, premiered two days later and features Rouvas singing in front of a microphone in the studio. A second, more sophisticated music video was released shortly after, directed by La Boo, portraying Rouvas on a dark rural road running away from a woman who is slowly approaching him in a car. The driver shifts into high gear to run him over, although Rouvas super-physically performs a backward flip while propelling himself off the car in midair, thus landing securely behind the car feet-first and fully intact. The driver then turns around and once again chases Rouvas.

"This Is Our Night"

The third single from the album and the first released after the re-release is Rouvas' Eurovision Song Contest 2009 entry "This Is Our Night". The song peaked at number one on the Greek Airplay Chart and Greek/International Airplay Chart and for three and two consecutive weeks, respectively; it remained in the top 10 of the former for 10 weeks.

"Ksehna To Prin Kai To Meta"

The final single from the album is "Ksehna To Prin Kai To Meta". The music video will premiere on MAD TV in September.

== Releases ==
=== Release history ===
Region	Date	Label	Format	Edition
Greece	3 December 2008	Minos EMI	CD	Original
Greece	22 December 2008	Minos EMI	Digital download	Original
Greece	11 April 2009	Minos EMI	CD	This Is Our Night
Cyprus	22 December 2008	Minos EMI	CD	Original
Cyprus	11 April 2009	Minos EMI	CD	This Is Our Night

=== Promotion ===
Promotional poster of Rouvas' STARZ concert series with the Maggira Sisters.

Sakis Rouvas was the host of the Greek "The X Factor". On 28 November 2008 episode, Rouvas performed the title track "Irthes" live on the show. He also performed "Vimata" and "Hamogela" in subsequent episodes.

On 4 December 2008, Sakis Rouvas premiered his winter season shows with the Maggira Sisters at STARZ where he performed songs off of the album. The show was a commercial success and extended to late February. A special presentation of the show was held on Love Radio called "Sakis Live in Love". Rouvas was also Greece's Eurovision participant for 2009.

== Reception ==
Professional ratings
Review scores
Source	Rating
Avopolis	1.5/5 stars
Ethnos	(favourable)
Music Corner	(favourable)

=== Critical response ===
As with Rouvas' last studio album Iparhi Agapi Edo, Irthes received generally favorable reviews, although the general consensus was that it was not one of Rouvas' biggest efforts. The album earned Rouvas a number of awards and nominations, including wins at the MAD Video Music Awards for "Male Artist of the Year" and "Artist of the Year" in 2009, and the "Singer of the Year" at the Status Men of the Year Awards in 2010.

=== Commercial performance ===
Irthes debuted on week 50 of IFPI's Greek Albums Chart at number five, only coming behind Michalis Hatzigiannis' 7, Alkistis Protopsalti's Ki Eimaste Akoma Zondani, Antonis Remos' Alithies & Psemata, and Eleftheria Arvanitaki's Kai Ta Matia Kai I Kardia, where it also remained for a second week. The album moved up to number two in its third week on the chart, behind Anna Vissi's album Apagorevmeno. In its fourth week, the album dropped to number 15, where it remained for its fifth week as well, however, it moved back up to number 6 in its sixth week. It was certified gold after its fourteenth week, denoting shipments of 15 thousand copies, and as of the week 11/2009 charts, it has charted for 15 weeks. From March 2009 to October 2010, IFPI Greece closed operations, making it impossible to track the album's sales through its database after that point. In 2009, IFPI lowered its thresholds to 12 thousand for platinum status, meaning Irthes would have automatically been converted to platinum status as its previous certified shipments had surpassed that amount, although any further sales are unknown.

The album placed at number twenty-four on IFPI's Year-end chart for Top 50 Greek albums of 2008, and number twenty-nine on the Top 50 Greek and Foreign Albums of 2008.

== Charts ==
Chart	Peak position	Weeks on chart	Certification
Greek Albums Chart	2	18	Platinum
Cypriot Album Chart	1	10	–
Top 50 Greek Albums of 2008	24	-	-
Top 50 Greek and Foreign Albums of 2008	29	-	-

== Awards ==
Eurovision Song Contest

- 4th place, 110 points – Semi-final ("This Is Our Night")
- 7th place, 120 points – Final ("This Is Our Night")

MAD Video Music Awards

- Best Pop Video ("Irthes" — Nominated)
- Male Artist of the Year ("This Is Our Night")
- Artist of the Year ("This Is Our Night")
- Best Direction (La Boo for "Irthes" — Nominated)
- Fashion Icon of the Year ("Irthes" — Nominated)
- Best Line that Became a Quote ("This Is Our Night" for the line "this is our night" — Nominated)

Status Men of the Year Awards

- Singer of the Year

Tashir Armenian Music Awards

- Award of Hope ("This Is Our Night")
