= This Is Our Night =

2009 song by Sakis Rouvas

Single by Sakis Rouvas

from the album This Is Our Night
- B-side: "Right on Time"; "Out of Control"
- Released: 12 February 2009
- Genre: Pop; dance
- Length: 2:59
- Label: Minos EMI
- Composer: Dimitris Kontopoulos
- Lyricists: Craig Porteils; Cameron Giles-Webb
- Producer: Dimitris Kontopoulos

Sakis Rouvas singles chronology
"Zise Ti Zoi" (2007)	"This Is Our Night" (2009)	"Spase To Hrono" (2009)

Music video
- "This Is Our Night" on YouTube

Audio sample
- file; help

"Pio Dinata"
- The cover of the digital single of "Pio Dinata"

Eurovision Song Contest 2009 entry
- Country: Greece
- Artist: Sakis Rouvas
- Language: English
- Composer: Dimitris Kontopoulos
- Lyricists: Craig Porteils; Cameron Giles-Webb

Finals performance
- Semi-final result: 4th
- Semi-final points: 110
- Final result: 7th
- Final points: 120

Entry chronology
- ◄ "Secret Combination" (2008)
- "Opa" (2010) ►

Official performance video
- "This Is Our Night" (semi-2) on YouTube "This Is Our Night" (final) on YouTube

"This Is Our Night" is a song by Greek singer Sakis Rouvas, from the album Irthes. The song music was composed by Dimitris Kontopoulos and it lyrics were written by Craig Porteils and Cameron Giles-Webb. It represented Greece in the Eurovision Song Contest 2009, held in Moscow.

The song was released as a digital download along with the other candidate songs from the national final on February 25 and was soon released as a three track CD single and then included on the re-release of Rouvas' 2008 album Irthes which was renamed This Is Our Night.

== Background ==
=== Conception ===
The song was composed and produced by Dimitris Kontopoulos. The lyrics were written by two Greek Australian songwriters: Craig Porteils, who had previously written and produced hits for Cher, Billy Idol, Tevin Campbell, Richie Sambora, Guns N' Roses and Ozzy Osbourne; and Cameron Giles-Webb, the president of Gusto Music. It is described as being a "powerful dance song".

Regarding the song, Rouvas stated:

"The 'our' in 'This Is Our Night' represents everyone, people in all the corners of the world. Especially those who believe in positive energy, passion and the energy of love. This song has no boundary, no ethnicity. I want to make everyone stand with rhythm, energy and optimism."

=== Selection ===
On 21 October 2008, the Hellenic Broadcasting Corporation (ERT) announced that it had internally selected Sakis Rouvas as its performer for the 54th edition of the Eurovision Song Contest.

"This Is Our Night" was one of the three songs composed specifically for the occasion by Kontopoulos. It was presented as the last performance of the press conference held on 12 February 2009 where they were revealed. On 18 February 2009, Rouvas performed them at the Greek National Final. "This Is Our Night" placed first over "Right on Time" and "Out of Control", winning the competition and becoming the Greek entrant for Eurovision.

=== Music video and promotion ===
The music video for "This Is Our Night" was filmed over two days over a total duration of 24 hours, finally wrapping up on 24 February, while it was also reported that it would take around three days afterward for the final processing to be completed. The video was directed by Katya Tsaryk, a young but well-known Ukrainian director who also created the video for the 2008 Ukrainian entry "Shady Lady" for singer Ani Lorak, being choreographed by Fokas Evangelinos. The shooting took place in Athens, at two main locations: the first was at the STARZ club where Rouvas is performing along with the Maggira Sisters for the winter season, set in front of a huge screen and many flashing lights; while the second was at the King George suite hotel, where the morning shooting took place. The rest of the video was shot around the city life of Athens, some shot solely by the cameramen while other filming was taking place, and other scenes featuring Rouvas. During the filming at STARZ, the doors were opened at 23:00 where reporters were allowed to enter, while Evangelinos, and the song's composer, Kontopoulos, as well as Rouvas' entire entourage and some ERT staff were also present.

MAD TV reported that the video features the strong beat of the song in combination with bright flashing lights in a dark setting that give an intense erotic sensation, also stating that the general concept of the video is of people in love surrounding Rouvas who wanders the city to showcase its most impressive sights. ERT stated that their production gave their best for the creation of the video, which features impressive Athenian scenery, beautiful landscapes, a lot of color, and scenes of people having fun and performing energetic choreography and the use of elaborate lighting that underpin the video clip along with a strong combination of Athenian culture. The director, Tsaryk, expressed how impressed she was with Rouvas' professionalism and capabilities.

Upon wrapping up filming, ERT released two backstage videos, and also stated that it would soon be released all over Europe as part of the promotion, while MAD TV also released a special photo report. On 10 March, ERT released a special preview, while the video officially premiered exclusively on 12 March on the official Eurovision/ert.gr site as well as on television on ERT-NET and ERT World for international audiences.

=== Eurovision ===
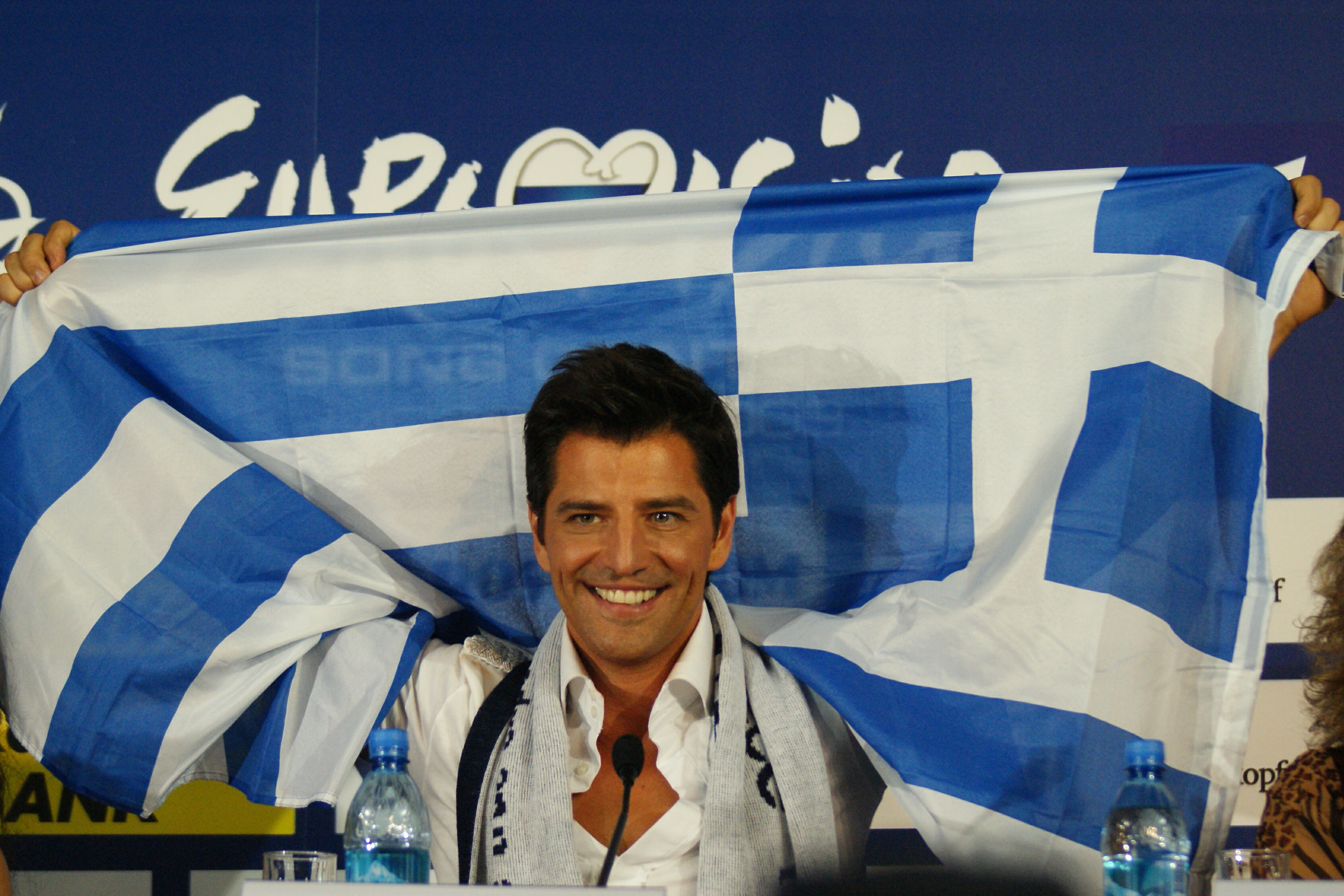
Rouvas at a Eurovision press conference in Moscow, during which the running order for the semi-final was revealed.

On 14 May 2009, the second semi-final of the Eurovision Song Contest was held in the Olimpiysky Arena in Moscow hosted by Channel One (C1R) and broadcast live throughout the continent. Rouvas performed "This Is Our Night" thirteenth on the evening and qualifying for the grand final.

On 16 May 2009, the grand final for the Eurovision Song Contest was held. Rouvas performed "This Is Our Night" again eighth on the evening.

The Eurovision performance staged by Fokas Evangelinos had extremely complex choreography, with BBC News announcing that "Greece's Sakis Rouvas had one of the more ambitious dance routines". Rouvas performed on a rotating podium which transported him from left to right across the stage, was part of his group dance routine with four other performers and, in the end, was responsible for lifting him high into the air. In the same moment, a Greek flag is displayed on the floor, only visible to the television viewers. The final part of the performance was completed by silver fireworks in two separate parts. The official Eurovision website states that with this performance, Greece had made "high-tech advancements" in the contest's standards.

At the end of voting, "This Is Our Night" finished in seventh place with a total of 120 points, receiving maximum 12 points from Albania, Bulgaria and Cyprus. The song therefore carried on Greece's Eurovision success by finishing within the top-ten for the sixth consecutive year, thus making the country the second most successful entrant of the past decade, despite not having even participated in 2000. The event was watched by 86% of the Greek television audience.

Whilst Rouvas was disappointed with his seventh-place finish, announcing to Greek media "I am so sorry, I wanted us to win", there was still unanimous support towards the artist himself in the country. "Seventh in Europe, first in our hearts" many journalists reported on Greek television. The media and public pronounced their support for Rouvas, the general consensus being that the artist gave it his best even though this did not translate in enough votes in the contest. All criticism in Greece focused on the selection of the song itself, rather than the artist's performance. Rouvas stated that, overall, it has all been a wonderful experience for him: "some win, some lose, personally, I gave everything I had. But it was a wonderful experience".

Some critics, including those from London Greek Radio, suggested the reason why Greece failed to achieve a higher placing was due to a lack of an ethnic-sounding song. He notes the way in which all of Greece's top-three placings, including Rouvas' performance of "Shake It" in 2004, had an ethnic bouzouki sound, as did the 2009 Azerbaijani and Turkish entries which finished in third and fourth place respectively.

=== Aftermath ===
A month after Eurovision, Rouvas released the song with Greek lyrics by Viki Gerothodorou as "Πιο Δυνατά" (Pio Dinata).

== Track listing ==
- Digital download
1. "Right on Time" – 3:05
2. "This Is Our Night" – 2:59
3. "Out of Control" – 3:01
- CD single
1. "This Is Our Night" – 2:59
2. "Right on Time" – 3:05
3. "Out of Control" – 3:01

== Release history ==
Region	Date	Label	Format
Greece	12 February 2009	Minos EMI	Radio single
Greece	25 February 2009	Minos EMI	Digital download
Cyprus	12 February 2009	Minos EMI	Radio single
Belgium	23 March 2009	Minos EMI	Radio single
Belgium	23 March 2009	Minos EMI	Digital download

== Charts ==
=== Weekly charts ===
Chart (2009)	Peak position
CIS Airplay (TopHit)	129
Greek Singles Chart	1
Sweden (Sverigetopplistan)	30
